= 2024 ATP Tour =

Men's tennis circuit

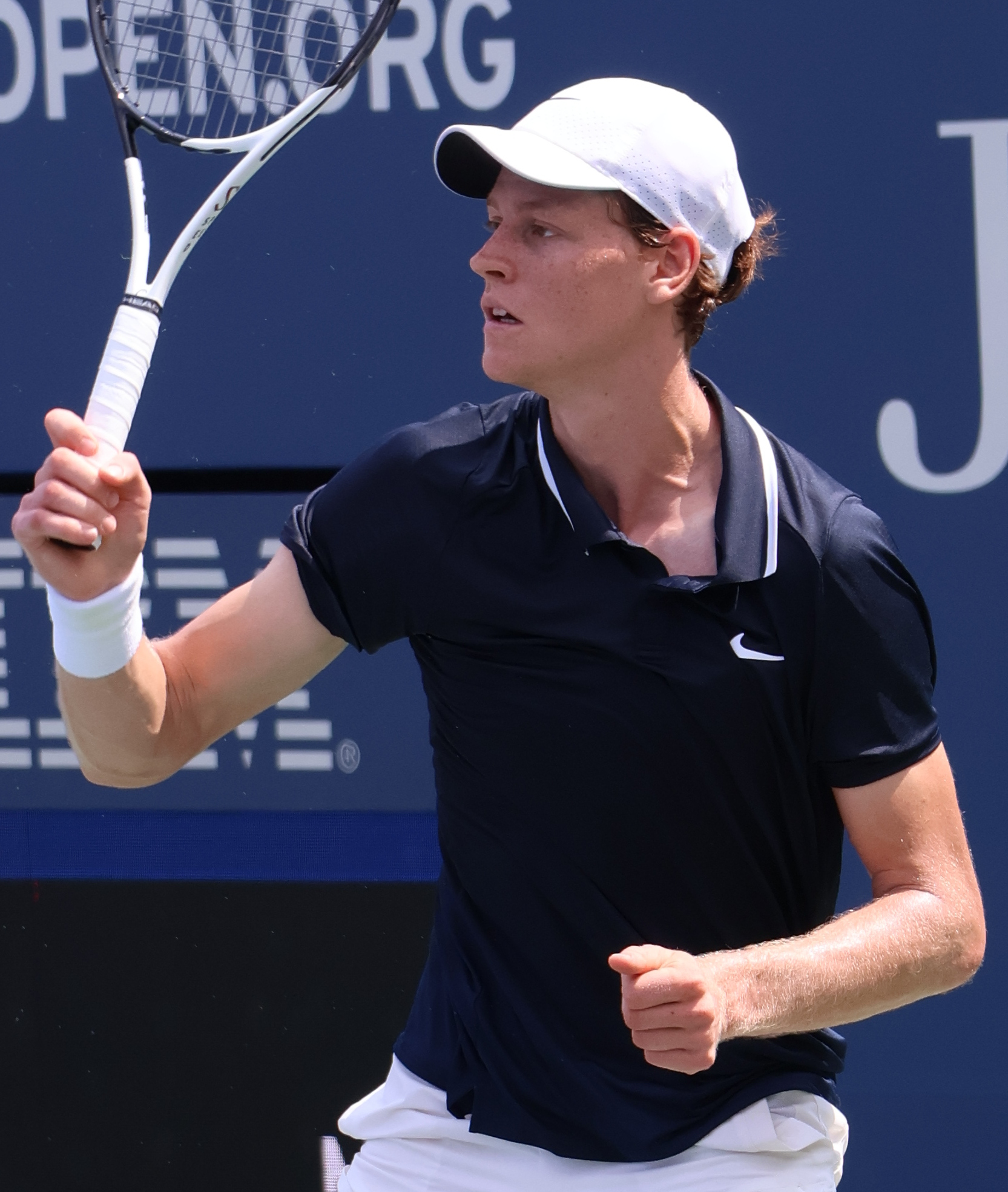
- Jannik Sinner finished the year as world No. 1 for the first time in his career. He won eight tournaments during the season, including two majors at the Australian Open and US Open, the ATP Finals, and three Masters 1000 events.

Details
- Duration: 29 Dec 2023 – 22 Dec 2024
- Edition: 55th
- Tournaments: 70
- Categories: Grand Slam (4); Summer Olympics; ATP Finals; ATP Masters 1000 (9); ATP 500 (13); ATP 250 (38); Next Gen finals Davis Cup; United Cup; Laver Cup

Achievements (singles)
- Most titles: (Italy) Jannik Sinner (8)
- Most finals: (Italy) Jannik Sinner (9)
- Prize money leader: (Italy) Jannik Sinner ($21,069,473)
- Points leader: (Italy) Jannik Sinner (11,830)

Awards
- Player of the year: (Italy) Jannik Sinner
- Doubles team of the year: (El Salvador) Marcelo Arévalo; (Croatia) Mate Pavić
- Most improved player of the year: (France) Giovanni Mpetshi Perricard
- Newcomer of the year: (Czech Republic) Jakub Menšík
- Comeback player of the year: (Italy) Matteo Berrettini

The 2024 ATP Tour was the global elite men's professional tennis circuit organized by the Association of Tennis Professionals (ATP) for the 2024 tennis season. The 2024 ATP Tour calendar comprised the Grand Slam tournaments, supervised by the International Tennis Federation (ITF), the ATP Finals, the ATP Masters 1000, the United Cup (organized with the WTA), the ATP 500 series and the ATP 250 series. Also included in the 2024 calendar are the Davis Cup (organised by the ITF), the Summer Olympics in Paris, Next Gen ATP Finals and Laver Cup, none of which distribute ranking points.

Jannik Sinner finished the year as world No. 1 for the first time in his career. He won eight tournaments during the season, including two majors at the Australian Open and US Open, as well as the ATP Finals. He also won three ATP Masters 1000 events.

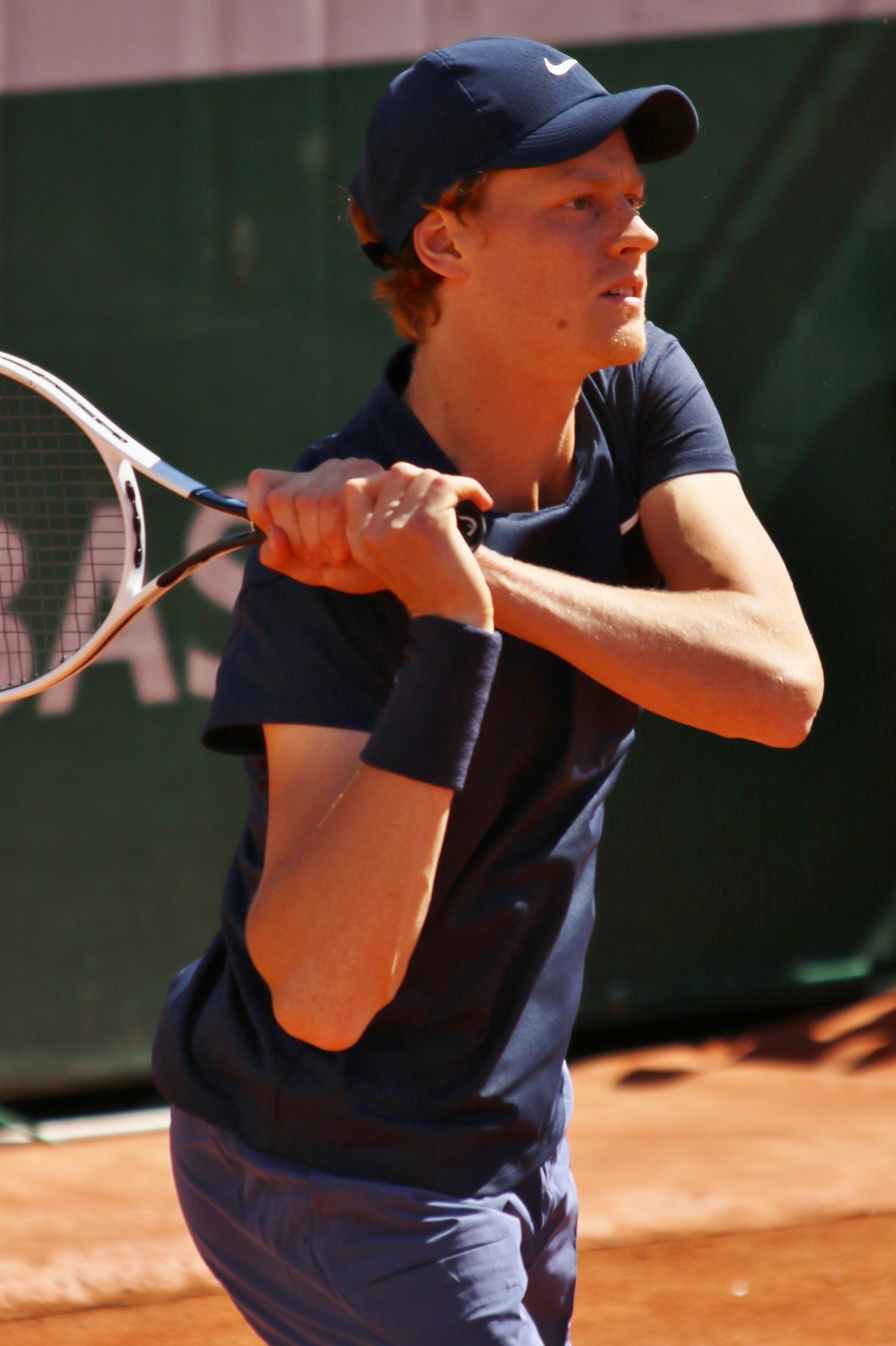
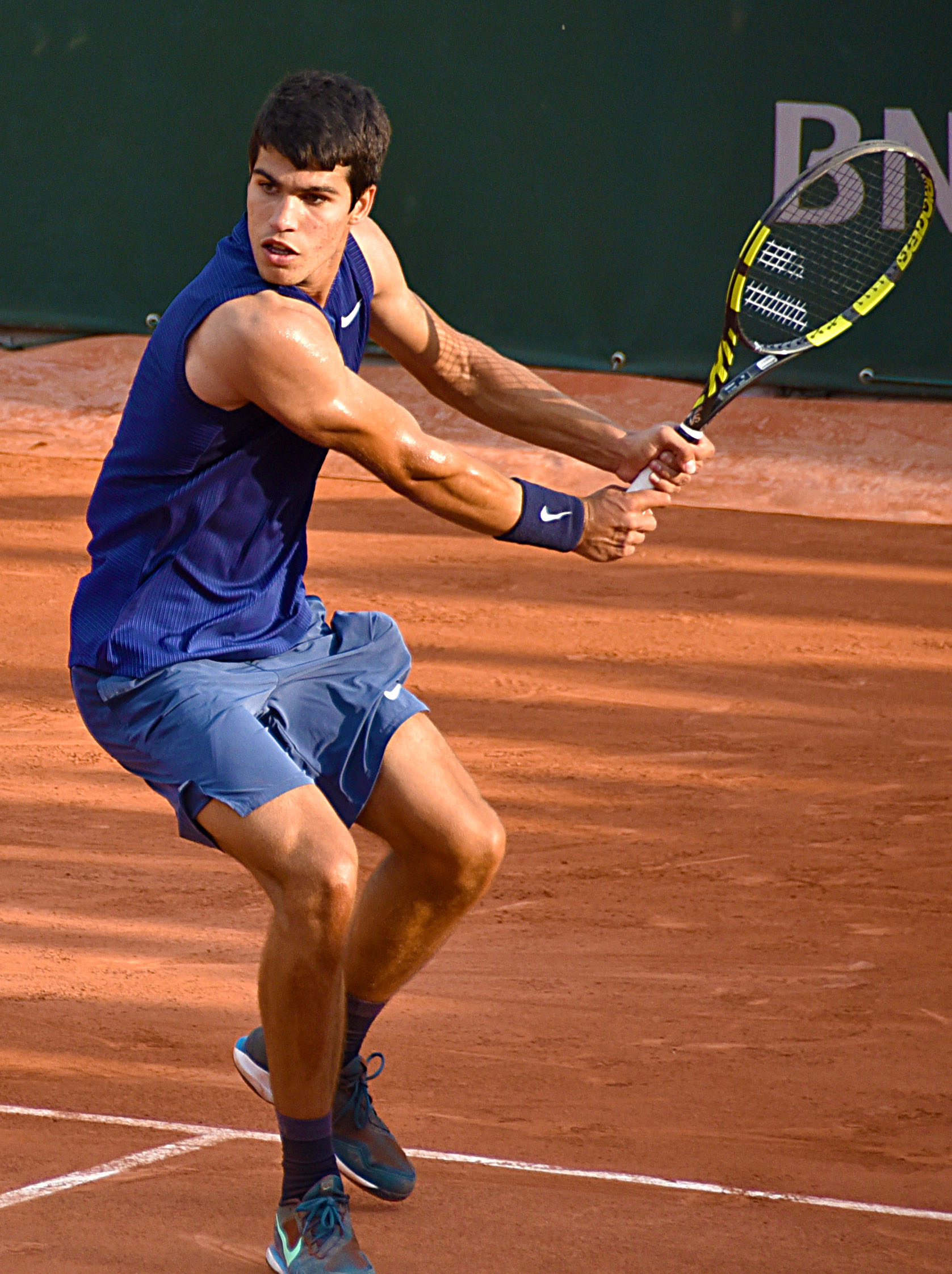
Jannik Sinner won the Australian Open and the US Open titles, while Carlos Alcaraz was champion of both the French Open and Wimbledon (the Channel Slam).

== Schedule ==
This is the schedule of events on the 2024 calendar.

Key
Grand Slam
Summer Olympics
ATP Finals
ATP 1000
ATP 500
ATP 250
Team events

=== January ===
Week	Tournament	Champions	Runners-up	Semifinalists	Quarterfinalists
1 Jan	United Cup; Perth/Sydney, Australia; United Cup; Hard – A$15,000,000 – 18 teams	(Germany) Germany; 2–1	Poland	France; Australia	China; Norway; Serbia; Greece
1 Jan	Hong Kong Open; Hong Kong SAR; ATP 250; Hard – $739,945 – 28S/16Q/16D; Singles – Doubles	Andrey Rublev; 6–4, 6–4	(Finland) Emil Ruusuvuori	(China) Shang Juncheng (Austria) Sebastian Ofner	(France) Arthur Fils (United States) Frances Tiafoe (Spain) Roberto Bautista Agut; Pavel Kotov
1 Jan	Hong Kong Open; Hong Kong SAR; ATP 250; Hard – $739,945 – 28S/16Q/16D; Singles – Doubles	(El Salvador) Marcelo Arévalo (Croatia) Mate Pavić; 7–6^{(7–3)}, 6–4	(Belgium) Sander Gillé (Belgium) Joran Vliegen	(China) Shang Juncheng (Austria) Sebastian Ofner	(France) Arthur Fils (United States) Frances Tiafoe (Spain) Roberto Bautista Agut; Pavel Kotov
1 Jan	Brisbane International; Brisbane, Australia; ATP 250; Hard – $739,945 – 32S/24Q/24D; Singles – Doubles	(Bulgaria) Grigor Dimitrov; 7–6^{(7–5)}, 6–4	(Denmark) Holger Rune	Roman Safiullin (Australia) Jordan Thompson	(Australia) James Duckworth (Italy) Matteo Arnaldi (Spain) Rafael Nadal (Australia) Rinky Hijikata
1 Jan	Brisbane International; Brisbane, Australia; ATP 250; Hard – $739,945 – 32S/24Q/24D; Singles – Doubles	(United Kingdom) Lloyd Glasspool (Netherlands) Jean-Julien Rojer; 7–6^{(7–3)}, 5–7, [12–10]	(Germany) Kevin Krawietz (Germany) Tim Pütz	Roman Safiullin (Australia) Jordan Thompson	(Australia) James Duckworth (Italy) Matteo Arnaldi (Spain) Rafael Nadal (Australia) Rinky Hijikata
8 Jan	Adelaide International; Adelaide, Australia; ATP 250; Hard – $739,945 – 28S/16Q/24D; Singles – Doubles	(Czech Republic) Jiří Lehečka; 4–6, 6–4, 6–3	(United Kingdom) Jack Draper	(Kazakhstan) Alexander Bublik (United States) Sebastian Korda	(United States) Tommy Paul (Italy) Lorenzo Musetti (Australia) Christopher O'Connell (Chile) Nicolás Jarry
8 Jan	Adelaide International; Adelaide, Australia; ATP 250; Hard – $739,945 – 28S/16Q/24D; Singles – Doubles	(United States) Rajeev Ram (United Kingdom) Joe Salisbury; 7–5, 5–7, [11–9]	(India) Rohan Bopanna (Australia) Matthew Ebden	(Kazakhstan) Alexander Bublik (United States) Sebastian Korda	(United States) Tommy Paul (Italy) Lorenzo Musetti (Australia) Christopher O'Connell (Chile) Nicolás Jarry
8 Jan	Auckland Open; Auckland, New Zealand; ATP 250; Hard – $739,945 – 28S/16Q/16D; Singles – Doubles	(Chile) Alejandro Tabilo; 6–2, 7–5	(Japan) Taro Daniel	(United States) Ben Shelton (France) Arthur Fils	(Spain) Roberto Carballés Baena (France) Alexandre Müller (Germany) Daniel Altmaier (United Kingdom) Cameron Norrie
8 Jan	Auckland Open; Auckland, New Zealand; ATP 250; Hard – $739,945 – 28S/16Q/16D; Singles – Doubles	(Netherlands) Wesley Koolhof (Croatia) Nikola Mektić; 6–3, 6–7^{(5–7)}, [10–7]	(Spain) Marcel Granollers (Argentina) Horacio Zeballos	(United States) Ben Shelton (France) Arthur Fils	(Spain) Roberto Carballés Baena (France) Alexandre Müller (Germany) Daniel Altmaier (United Kingdom) Cameron Norrie
15 Jan; 22 Jan	Australian Open; Melbourne, Australia; Grand Slam; Hard – A$38,923,200; 128S/128Q/64D/32X; Singles – Doubles – Mixed	(Italy) Jannik Sinner; 3–6, 3–6, 6–4, 6–4, 6–3	Daniil Medvedev	(Serbia) Novak Djokovic (Germany) Alexander Zverev	(United States) Taylor Fritz; Andrey Rublev (Poland) Hubert Hurkacz (Spain) Carlos Alcaraz
15 Jan; 22 Jan	Australian Open; Melbourne, Australia; Grand Slam; Hard – A$38,923,200; 128S/128Q/64D/32X; Singles – Doubles – Mixed	(India) Rohan Bopanna (Australia) Matthew Ebden; 7–6^{(7–0)}, 7–5	(Italy) Simone Bolelli (Italy) Andrea Vavassori	(Serbia) Novak Djokovic (Germany) Alexander Zverev	(United States) Taylor Fritz; Andrey Rublev (Poland) Hubert Hurkacz (Spain) Carlos Alcaraz
15 Jan; 22 Jan	Australian Open; Melbourne, Australia; Grand Slam; Hard – A$38,923,200; 128S/128Q/64D/32X; Singles – Doubles – Mixed	(Chinese Taipei) Hsieh Su-wei (Poland) Jan Zieliński; 6–7^{(5–7)}, 6–4, [11–9]	(United States) Desirae Krawczyk (United Kingdom) Neal Skupski	(Serbia) Novak Djokovic (Germany) Alexander Zverev	(United States) Taylor Fritz; Andrey Rublev (Poland) Hubert Hurkacz (Spain) Carlos Alcaraz
29 Jan	Davis Cup qualifying round Montreal, Canada – hard (i); Kraljevo, Serbia – clay (i); Varaždin, Croatia – hard (i); Tatabánya, Hungary – hard (i); Groningen, Netherlands – hard (i); Třinec, Czech Republic – hard (i); Vilnius, Lithuania – hard (i); Turku, Finland – hard (i); Taipei, Taiwan – hard (i); Rosario, Argentina – clay Helsingborg, Sweden – hard (i); Santiago, Chile – hard	Qualifying round winners Canada 3–1; Slovakia 4–0; Belgium 3–1; Germany 3–2; Netherlands 3–2; Czech Republic 4–0; United States 4–0; Finland 3–1; France 4–0; Argentina 3–2; Brazil 3–1; Chile 3–2	Qualifying round losers South Korea; Serbia; Croatia; Hungary; Switzerland; Israel; Ukraine; Portugal; Chinese Taipei; Kazakhstan; Sweden; Peru		
29 Jan	Open Sud de France; Montpellier, France; ATP 250; Hard (i) – €579,320 – 28S/16Q/16D; Singles – Doubles	(Kazakhstan) Alexander Bublik; 5–7, 6–2, 6–3	(Croatia) Borna Ćorić	(Denmark) Holger Rune (Canada) Félix Auger-Aliassime	(United States) Michael Mmoh (Italy) Flavio Cobolli (France) Harold Mayot (Kazakhstan) Alexander Shevchenko
29 Jan	Open Sud de France; Montpellier, France; ATP 250; Hard (i) – €579,320 – 28S/16Q/16D; Singles – Doubles	(France) Sadio Doumbia (France) Fabien Reboul; 6–7^{(5–7)}, 6–4, [10–6]	(France) Albano Olivetti (Austria) Sam Weissborn	(Denmark) Holger Rune (Canada) Félix Auger-Aliassime	(United States) Michael Mmoh (Italy) Flavio Cobolli (France) Harold Mayot (Kazakhstan) Alexander Shevchenko

=== February ===
Week	Tournament	Champions	Runners-up	Semifinalists	Quarterfinalists
5 Feb	Dallas Open; Dallas, United States; ATP 250; Hard (i) – $841,590 – 28S/16Q/16D; Singles – Doubles	(United States) Tommy Paul; 7–6^{(7–3)}, 5–7, 6–3	(United States) Marcos Giron	(France) Adrian Mannarino (United States) Ben Shelton	(United States) Frances Tiafoe (Australia) James Duckworth (Australia) Jordan Thompson (Germany) Dominik Koepfer
5 Feb	Dallas Open; Dallas, United States; ATP 250; Hard (i) – $841,590 – 28S/16Q/16D; Singles – Doubles	(Australia) Max Purcell (Australia) Jordan Thompson; 6–4, 2–6, [10–8]	(United States) William Blumberg (Australia) Rinky Hijikata	(France) Adrian Mannarino (United States) Ben Shelton	(United States) Frances Tiafoe (Australia) James Duckworth (Australia) Jordan Thompson (Germany) Dominik Koepfer
5 Feb	Open 13; Marseille, France; ATP 250; Hard (i) – €801,335 – 28S/16Q/16D; Singles – Doubles	(France) Ugo Humbert; 6–4, 6–3	(Bulgaria) Grigor Dimitrov	(Poland) Hubert Hurkacz; Karen Khachanov	(Czech Republic) Tomáš Macháč (Spain) Alejandro Davidovich Fokina (China) Zhang Zhizhen (France) Arthur Rinderknech
5 Feb	Open 13; Marseille, France; ATP 250; Hard (i) – €801,335 – 28S/16Q/16D; Singles – Doubles	(Czech Republic) Tomáš Macháč (China) Zhang Zhizhen; 6–3, 6–4	(Finland) Patrik Niklas-Salminen (Finland) Emil Ruusuvuori	(Poland) Hubert Hurkacz; Karen Khachanov	(Czech Republic) Tomáš Macháč (Spain) Alejandro Davidovich Fokina (China) Zhang Zhizhen (France) Arthur Rinderknech
5 Feb	Córdoba Open; Córdoba, Argentina; ATP 250; Clay – $640,705 – 28S/16Q/16D; Singles – Doubles	(Italy) Luciano Darderi; 6–1, 6–4	(Argentina) Facundo Bagnis	(Argentina) Federico Coria (Argentina) Sebastián Báez	(Spain) Jaume Munar (Argentina) Tomás Martín Etcheverry (Germany) Yannick Hanfmann (Argentina) Facundo Díaz Acosta
5 Feb	Córdoba Open; Córdoba, Argentina; ATP 250; Clay – $640,705 – 28S/16Q/16D; Singles – Doubles	(Argentina) Máximo González (Argentina) Andrés Molteni; 6–4, 6–1	(France) Sadio Doumbia (France) Fabien Reboul	(Argentina) Federico Coria (Argentina) Sebastián Báez	(Spain) Jaume Munar (Argentina) Tomás Martín Etcheverry (Germany) Yannick Hanfmann (Argentina) Facundo Díaz Acosta
12 Feb	Rotterdam Open; Rotterdam, Netherlands; ATP 500; Hard (i) – €2,290,720 – 32S/16Q/16D; Singles – Doubles	(Italy) Jannik Sinner; 7–5, 6–4	(Australia) Alex de Minaur	(Netherlands) Tallon Griekspoor (Bulgaria) Grigor Dimitrov	(Canada) Milos Raonic (Finland) Emil Ruusuvuori (Kazakhstan) Alexander Shevchenko; Andrey Rublev
12 Feb	Rotterdam Open; Rotterdam, Netherlands; ATP 500; Hard (i) – €2,290,720 – 32S/16Q/16D; Singles – Doubles	(Netherlands) Wesley Koolhof (Croatia) Nikola Mektić; 6–3, 7–5	(Netherlands) Robin Haase (Netherlands) Botic van de Zandschulp	(Netherlands) Tallon Griekspoor (Bulgaria) Grigor Dimitrov	(Canada) Milos Raonic (Finland) Emil Ruusuvuori (Kazakhstan) Alexander Shevchenko; Andrey Rublev
12 Feb	Delray Beach Open; Delray Beach, United States; ATP 250; Hard – $742,350 – 28S/16Q/16D; Singles – Doubles	(United States) Taylor Fritz; 6–2, 6–3	(United States) Tommy Paul	(United States) Marcos Giron (United States) Frances Tiafoe	(Australia) Rinky Hijikata (United States) Patrick Kypson (Australia) Jordan Thompson (Italy) Flavio Cobolli
12 Feb	Delray Beach Open; Delray Beach, United States; ATP 250; Hard – $742,350 – 28S/16Q/16D; Singles – Doubles	(United Kingdom) Julian Cash (United States) Robert Galloway; 5–7, 7–5, [10–2]	(Mexico) Santiago González (United Kingdom) Neal Skupski	(United States) Marcos Giron (United States) Frances Tiafoe	(Australia) Rinky Hijikata (United States) Patrick Kypson (Australia) Jordan Thompson (Italy) Flavio Cobolli
12 Feb	Argentina Open; Buenos Aires, Argentina; ATP 250; Clay – $728,185 – 28S/16Q/16D; Singles – Doubles	(Argentina) Facundo Díaz Acosta; 6–3, 6–4	(Chile) Nicolás Jarry	(Spain) Carlos Alcaraz (Argentina) Federico Coria	(Italy) Andrea Vavassori (Argentina) Tomás Martín Etcheverry (Serbia) Dušan Lajović (Argentina) Sebastián Báez
12 Feb	Argentina Open; Buenos Aires, Argentina; ATP 250; Clay – $728,185 – 28S/16Q/16D; Singles – Doubles	(Italy) Simone Bolelli (Italy) Andrea Vavassori; 6–2, 7–6^{(8–6)}	(Argentina) Horacio Zeballos (Spain) Marcel Granollers	(Spain) Carlos Alcaraz (Argentina) Federico Coria	(Italy) Andrea Vavassori (Argentina) Tomás Martín Etcheverry (Serbia) Dušan Lajović (Argentina) Sebastián Báez
19 Feb	Rio Open; Rio de Janeiro, Brazil; ATP 500; Clay – $2,271,715 – 32S/16Q/16D; Singles – Doubles	(Argentina) Sebastián Báez; 6–2, 6–1	(Argentina) Mariano Navone	(Argentina) Francisco Cerúndolo (United Kingdom) Cameron Norrie	(Brazil) Thiago Monteiro (Serbia) Dušan Lajović (Brazil) João Fonseca (Brazil) Thiago Seyboth Wild
19 Feb	Rio Open; Rio de Janeiro, Brazil; ATP 500; Clay – $2,271,715 – 32S/16Q/16D; Singles – Doubles	(Colombia) Nicolás Barrientos (Brazil) Rafael Matos; 6–4, 6–3	(Austria) Alexander Erler (Austria) Lucas Miedler	(Argentina) Francisco Cerúndolo (United Kingdom) Cameron Norrie	(Brazil) Thiago Monteiro (Serbia) Dušan Lajović (Brazil) João Fonseca (Brazil) Thiago Seyboth Wild
19 Feb	Qatar Open; Doha, Qatar; ATP 250; Hard – $1,493,465 – 28S/16Q/16D; Singles – Doubles	Karen Khachanov; 7–6^{(14–12)}, 6–4	(Czech Republic) Jakub Menšík	(France) Gaël Monfils (Australia) Alexei Popyrin	Andrey Rublev (France) Ugo Humbert (Kazakhstan) Alexander Bublik (Finland) Emil Ruusuvuori
19 Feb	Qatar Open; Doha, Qatar; ATP 250; Hard – $1,493,465 – 28S/16Q/16D; Singles – Doubles	(United Kingdom) Jamie Murray (New Zealand) Michael Venus; 7–6^{(7–0)}, 2–6, [10–8]	(Italy) Lorenzo Musetti (Italy) Lorenzo Sonego	(France) Gaël Monfils (Australia) Alexei Popyrin	Andrey Rublev (France) Ugo Humbert (Kazakhstan) Alexander Bublik (Finland) Emil Ruusuvuori
19 Feb	Los Cabos Open; Los Cabos, Mexico; ATP 250; Hard – $1,005,620 – 28S/16Q/16D; Singles – Doubles	(Australia) Jordan Thompson; 6–3, 7–6^{(7–4)}	(Norway) Casper Ruud	(Germany) Alexander Zverev (Greece) Stefanos Tsitsipas	(Australia) Thanasi Kokkinakis (United States) Alex Michelsen (Portugal) Nuno Borges (United States) Aleksandar Kovacevic
19 Feb	Los Cabos Open; Los Cabos, Mexico; ATP 250; Hard – $1,005,620 – 28S/16Q/16D; Singles – Doubles	(Australia) Max Purcell (Australia) Jordan Thompson; 7–5, 7–6^{(7–2)}	(Ecuador) Gonzalo Escobar (Kazakhstan) Aleksandr Nedovyesov	(Germany) Alexander Zverev (Greece) Stefanos Tsitsipas	(Australia) Thanasi Kokkinakis (United States) Alex Michelsen (Portugal) Nuno Borges (United States) Aleksandar Kovacevic
26 Feb	Dubai Tennis Championships; Dubai, United Arab Emirates; ATP 500; Hard – $3,113,270 – 32S/16Q/16D; Singles – Doubles	(France) Ugo Humbert; 6–4, 6–3	(Kazakhstan) Alexander Bublik	Daniil Medvedev; Andrey Rublev	(Spain) Alejandro Davidovich Fokina (Poland) Hubert Hurkacz (Czech Republic) Jiří Lehečka (United States) Sebastian Korda
26 Feb	Dubai Tennis Championships; Dubai, United Arab Emirates; ATP 500; Hard – $3,113,270 – 32S/16Q/16D; Singles – Doubles	(Netherlands) Tallon Griekspoor (Germany) Jan-Lennard Struff; 6–4, 4–6, [10–6]	(Croatia) Ivan Dodig (United States) Austin Krajicek	Daniil Medvedev; Andrey Rublev	(Spain) Alejandro Davidovich Fokina (Poland) Hubert Hurkacz (Czech Republic) Jiří Lehečka (United States) Sebastian Korda
26 Feb	Mexican Open; Acapulco, Mexico; ATP 500; Hard – $2,377,565 – 32S/16Q/16D; Singles – Doubles	(Australia) Alex de Minaur; 6–4, 6–4	(Norway) Casper Ruud	(United Kingdom) Jack Draper (Denmark) Holger Rune	(Serbia) Miomir Kecmanović (Greece) Stefanos Tsitsipas (United States) Ben Shelton (Germany) Dominik Koepfer
26 Feb	Mexican Open; Acapulco, Mexico; ATP 500; Hard – $2,377,565 – 32S/16Q/16D; Singles – Doubles	(Monaco) Hugo Nys (Poland) Jan Zieliński; 6–3, 6–2	(Mexico) Santiago González (United Kingdom) Neal Skupski	(United Kingdom) Jack Draper (Denmark) Holger Rune	(Serbia) Miomir Kecmanović (Greece) Stefanos Tsitsipas (United States) Ben Shelton (Germany) Dominik Koepfer
26 Feb	Chile Open; Santiago, Chile; ATP 250; Clay – $742,350 – 28S/16Q/16D; Singles – Doubles	(Argentina) Sebastián Báez; 3–6, 6–0, 6–4	(Chile) Alejandro Tabilo	(France) Corentin Moutet (Spain) Pedro Martínez	(Chile) Nicolás Jarry (Italy) Luciano Darderi (France) Arthur Fils (Spain) Jaume Munar
26 Feb	Chile Open; Santiago, Chile; ATP 250; Clay – $742,350 – 28S/16Q/16D; Singles – Doubles	(Chile) Tomás Barrios Vera (Chile) Alejandro Tabilo; 6–2, 6–4	(Brazil) Orlando Luz (Chile) Matías Soto	(France) Corentin Moutet (Spain) Pedro Martínez	(Chile) Nicolás Jarry (Italy) Luciano Darderi (France) Arthur Fils (Spain) Jaume Munar

=== March ===
Week	Tournament	Champions	Runners-up	Semifinalists	Quarterfinalists
4 Mar; 11 Mar	Indian Wells Open; Indian Wells, United States; ATP Masters 1000; Hard – $8,995,555 – 96S/48Q/32D; Singles – Doubles – Mixed	(Spain) Carlos Alcaraz; 7–6^{(7–5)}, 6–1	Daniil Medvedev	(United States) Tommy Paul (Italy) Jannik Sinner	(Norway) Casper Ruud (Denmark) Holger Rune (Czech Republic) Jiří Lehečka (Germany) Alexander Zverev
4 Mar; 11 Mar	Indian Wells Open; Indian Wells, United States; ATP Masters 1000; Hard – $8,995,555 – 96S/48Q/32D; Singles – Doubles – Mixed	(Netherlands) Wesley Koolhof (Croatia) Nikola Mektić; 7–6^{(7–2)}, 7–6^{(7–4)}	(Spain) Marcel Granollers (Argentina) Horacio Zeballos	(United States) Tommy Paul (Italy) Jannik Sinner	(Norway) Casper Ruud (Denmark) Holger Rune (Czech Republic) Jiří Lehečka (Germany) Alexander Zverev
4 Mar; 11 Mar	Indian Wells Open; Indian Wells, United States; ATP Masters 1000; Hard – $8,995,555 – 96S/48Q/32D; Singles – Doubles – Mixed	(Australia) Storm Hunter (Australia) Matthew Ebden; 6–3, 6–3	(France) Caroline Garcia (France) Édouard Roger-Vasselin	(United States) Tommy Paul (Italy) Jannik Sinner	(Norway) Casper Ruud (Denmark) Holger Rune (Czech Republic) Jiří Lehečka (Germany) Alexander Zverev
18 Mar; 25 Mar	Miami Open; Miami Gardens, United States; ATP Masters 1000; Hard – $8,995,555 – 96S/48Q/32D; Singles – Doubles	(Italy) Jannik Sinner; 6–3, 6–1	(Bulgaria) Grigor Dimitrov	(Germany) Alexander Zverev; Daniil Medvedev	(Spain) Carlos Alcaraz (Hungary) Fábián Marozsán (Chile) Nicolás Jarry (Czech Republic) Tomáš Macháč
18 Mar; 25 Mar	Miami Open; Miami Gardens, United States; ATP Masters 1000; Hard – $8,995,555 – 96S/48Q/32D; Singles – Doubles	(India) Rohan Bopanna (Australia) Matthew Ebden; 6–7^{(3–7)}, 6–3, [10–6]	(Croatia) Ivan Dodig (United States) Austin Krajicek	(Germany) Alexander Zverev; Daniil Medvedev	(Spain) Carlos Alcaraz (Hungary) Fábián Marozsán (Chile) Nicolás Jarry (Czech Republic) Tomáš Macháč

=== April ===
Week	Tournament	Champions	Runners-up	Semifinalists	Quarterfinalists
1 Apr	U.S. Men's Clay Court Championships; Houston, United States; ATP 250; Clay – $742,350 – 28S/16Q/16D; Singles – Doubles	(United States) Ben Shelton; 7–5, 4–6, 6–3	(United States) Frances Tiafoe	(Argentina) Tomás Martín Etcheverry (Italy) Luciano Darderi	(United States) Brandon Nakashima (United States) Michael Mmoh (Australia) Jordan Thompson (United States) Marcos Giron
1 Apr	U.S. Men's Clay Court Championships; Houston, United States; ATP 250; Clay – $742,350 – 28S/16Q/16D; Singles – Doubles	(Australia) Max Purcell (Australia) Jordan Thompson; 7–5, 6–1	(United States) William Blumberg (Australia) John Peers	(Argentina) Tomás Martín Etcheverry (Italy) Luciano Darderi	(United States) Brandon Nakashima (United States) Michael Mmoh (Australia) Jordan Thompson (United States) Marcos Giron
1 Apr	Estoril Open; Cascais, Portugal; ATP 250; Clay – €651,865 – 28S/16Q/16D; Singles – Doubles	(Poland) Hubert Hurkacz; 6–3, 6–4	(Spain) Pedro Martínez	(Norway) Casper Ruud (Chile) Cristian Garín	(Hungary) Márton Fucsovics (France) Richard Gasquet (Portugal) Nuno Borges (Spain) Pablo Llamas Ruiz
1 Apr	Estoril Open; Cascais, Portugal; ATP 250; Clay – €651,865 – 28S/16Q/16D; Singles – Doubles	(Ecuador) Gonzalo Escobar (Kazakhstan) Aleksandr Nedovyesov; 7–5, 6–2	(France) Sadio Doumbia (France) Fabien Reboul	(Norway) Casper Ruud (Chile) Cristian Garín	(Hungary) Márton Fucsovics (France) Richard Gasquet (Portugal) Nuno Borges (Spain) Pablo Llamas Ruiz
1 Apr	Grand Prix Hassan II; Marrakesh, Morocco; ATP 250; Clay – €651,865 – 28S/16Q/16D; Singles – Doubles	(Italy) Matteo Berrettini; 7–5, 6–2	(Spain) Roberto Carballés Baena	Pavel Kotov (Argentina) Mariano Navone	(Italy) Fabio Fognini (United States) Nicolas Moreno de Alboran (Italy) Lorenzo Sonego (Australia) Aleksandar Vukic
1 Apr	Grand Prix Hassan II; Marrakesh, Morocco; ATP 250; Clay – €651,865 – 28S/16Q/16D; Singles – Doubles	(Finland) Harri Heliövaara (United Kingdom) Henry Patten; 3–6, 6–4, [10–4]	(Austria) Alexander Erler (Austria) Lucas Miedler	Pavel Kotov (Argentina) Mariano Navone	(Italy) Fabio Fognini (United States) Nicolas Moreno de Alboran (Italy) Lorenzo Sonego (Australia) Aleksandar Vukic
8 Apr	Monte-Carlo Masters; Roquebrune-Cap-Martin, France; ATP Masters 1000; Clay – €5,950,575 – 56S/28Q/28D; Singles – Doubles	(Greece) Stefanos Tsitsipas; 6–1, 6–4	(Norway) Casper Ruud	(Serbia) Novak Djokovic (Italy) Jannik Sinner	(Australia) Alex de Minaur (France) Ugo Humbert; Karen Khachanov (Denmark) Holger Rune
8 Apr	Monte-Carlo Masters; Roquebrune-Cap-Martin, France; ATP Masters 1000; Clay – €5,950,575 – 56S/28Q/28D; Singles – Doubles	(Belgium) Sander Gillé (Belgium) Joran Vliegen; 5–7, 6–3, [10–5]	(Brazil) Marcelo Melo (Germany) Alexander Zverev	(Serbia) Novak Djokovic (Italy) Jannik Sinner	(Australia) Alex de Minaur (France) Ugo Humbert; Karen Khachanov (Denmark) Holger Rune
15 Apr	Barcelona Open; Barcelona, Spain; ATP 500; Clay – €2,938,695 – 48S/24Q/16D; Singles – Doubles	(Norway) Casper Ruud; 7–5, 6–3	(Greece) Stefanos Tsitsipas	(Serbia) Dušan Lajović (Argentina) Tomás Martín Etcheverry	(Argentina) Facundo Díaz Acosta (France) Arthur Fils (Italy) Matteo Arnaldi (United Kingdom) Cameron Norrie
15 Apr	Barcelona Open; Barcelona, Spain; ATP 500; Clay – €2,938,695 – 48S/24Q/16D; Singles – Doubles	(Argentina) Máximo González (Argentina) Andrés Molteni; 4–6, 6–4, [11–9]	(Monaco) Hugo Nys (Poland) Jan Zieliński	(Serbia) Dušan Lajović (Argentina) Tomás Martín Etcheverry	(Argentina) Facundo Díaz Acosta (France) Arthur Fils (Italy) Matteo Arnaldi (United Kingdom) Cameron Norrie
15 Apr	Romanian Open; Bucharest, Romania; ATP 250; Clay – €651,865 – 28S/16Q/16D; Singles – Doubles	(Hungary) Márton Fucsovics; 6–4, 7–5	(Argentina) Mariano Navone	(France) Grégoire Barrère (Chile) Alejandro Tabilo	(Argentina) Francisco Cerúndolo (Spain) Pedro Martínez (Brazil) João Fonseca (France) Corentin Moutet
15 Apr	Romanian Open; Bucharest, Romania; ATP 250; Clay – €651,865 – 28S/16Q/16D; Singles – Doubles	(France) Sadio Doumbia (France) Fabien Reboul; 6–3, 7–5	(Finland) Harri Heliövaara (United Kingdom) Henry Patten	(France) Grégoire Barrère (Chile) Alejandro Tabilo	(Argentina) Francisco Cerúndolo (Spain) Pedro Martínez (Brazil) João Fonseca (France) Corentin Moutet
15 Apr	Bavarian International Tennis; Championships; Munich, Germany; ATP 250; Clay – €651,865 – 28S/16Q/16D; Singles – Doubles	(Germany) Jan-Lennard Struff; 7–5, 6–3	(United States) Taylor Fritz	(Chile) Cristian Garín (Denmark) Holger Rune	(Germany) Alexander Zverev (United Kingdom) Jack Draper (Canada) Félix Auger-Aliassime (Switzerland) Marc-Andrea Hüsler
15 Apr	Bavarian International Tennis; Championships; Munich, Germany; ATP 250; Clay – €651,865 – 28S/16Q/16D; Singles – Doubles	(India) Yuki Bhambri (France) Albano Olivetti; 7–6^{(8–6)}, 7–6^{(7–5)}	(Germany) Andreas Mies (Germany) Jan-Lennard Struff	(Chile) Cristian Garín (Denmark) Holger Rune	(Germany) Alexander Zverev (United Kingdom) Jack Draper (Canada) Félix Auger-Aliassime (Switzerland) Marc-Andrea Hüsler
22 Apr; 29 Apr	Madrid Open; Madrid, Spain; ATP Masters 1000; Clay – €7,877,020 – 96S/48Q/32D; Singles – Doubles	Andrey Rublev; 4–6, 7–5, 7–5	(Canada) Félix Auger-Aliassime	(Czech Republic) Jiří Lehečka (United States) Taylor Fritz	(Italy) Jannik Sinner; Daniil Medvedev (Argentina) Francisco Cerúndolo (Spain) Carlos Alcaraz
22 Apr; 29 Apr	Madrid Open; Madrid, Spain; ATP Masters 1000; Clay – €7,877,020 – 96S/48Q/32D; Singles – Doubles	(United States) Sebastian Korda (Australia) Jordan Thompson; 6–3, 7–6^{(9–7)}	(Uruguay) Ariel Behar (Czech Republic) Adam Pavlásek	(Czech Republic) Jiří Lehečka (United States) Taylor Fritz	(Italy) Jannik Sinner; Daniil Medvedev (Argentina) Francisco Cerúndolo (Spain) Carlos Alcaraz

=== May ===
Week	Tournament	Champions	Runners-up	Semifinalists	Quarterfinalists
6 May; 13 May	Italian Open; Rome, Italy; ATP Masters 1000; Clay – €7,877,020 – 96S/48Q/32D; Singles – Doubles	(Germany) Alexander Zverev; 6–4, 7–5	(Chile) Nicolás Jarry	(Chile) Alejandro Tabilo (United States) Tommy Paul	(China) Zhang Zhizhen (United States) Taylor Fritz (Greece) Stefanos Tsitsipas (Poland) Hubert Hurkacz
6 May; 13 May	Italian Open; Rome, Italy; ATP Masters 1000; Clay – €7,877,020 – 96S/48Q/32D; Singles – Doubles	(Spain) Marcel Granollers (Argentina) Horacio Zeballos; 6–2, 6–2	(El Salvador) Marcelo Arévalo (Croatia) Mate Pavić	(Chile) Alejandro Tabilo (United States) Tommy Paul	(China) Zhang Zhizhen (United States) Taylor Fritz (Greece) Stefanos Tsitsipas (Poland) Hubert Hurkacz
20 May	Geneva Open; Geneva, Switzerland; ATP 250; Clay – €651,865 – 28S/16Q/16D; Singles – Doubles	(Norway) Casper Ruud; 7–5, 6–3	(Czech Republic) Tomáš Macháč	(Serbia) Novak Djokovic (Italy) Flavio Cobolli	(Netherlands) Tallon Griekspoor (United States) Alex Michelsen (Kazakhstan) Alexander Shevchenko (Argentina) Sebastián Báez
20 May	Geneva Open; Geneva, Switzerland; ATP 250; Clay – €651,865 – 28S/16Q/16D; Singles – Doubles	(El Salvador) Marcelo Arévalo (Croatia) Mate Pavić; 7–6^{(7–2)}, 7–5	(United Kingdom) Lloyd Glasspool (Netherlands) Jean-Julien Rojer	(Serbia) Novak Djokovic (Italy) Flavio Cobolli	(Netherlands) Tallon Griekspoor (United States) Alex Michelsen (Kazakhstan) Alexander Shevchenko (Argentina) Sebastián Báez
20 May	Lyon Open; Lyon, France; ATP 250; Clay – €651,865 – 28S/16Q/16D; Singles – Doubles	(France) Giovanni Mpetshi Perricard; 6–4, 1–6, 7–6^{(9–7)}	(Argentina) Tomás Martín Etcheverry	(Italy) Luciano Darderi (Kazakhstan) Alexander Bublik	(Germany) Dominik Koepfer (France) Arthur Rinderknech (France) Hugo Gaston; Pavel Kotov
20 May	Lyon Open; Lyon, France; ATP 250; Clay – €651,865 – 28S/16Q/16D; Singles – Doubles	(Finland) Harri Heliövaara (United Kingdom) Henry Patten; 3–6, 7–6^{(7–4)}, [10–8]	(India) Yuki Bhambri (France) Albano Olivetti	(Italy) Luciano Darderi (Kazakhstan) Alexander Bublik	(Germany) Dominik Koepfer (France) Arthur Rinderknech (France) Hugo Gaston; Pavel Kotov
27 May; 3 Jun	French Open; Paris, France; Grand Slam; Clay – €24,961,000 – 128S/128Q/64D/32X; Singles – Doubles – Mixed	(Spain) Carlos Alcaraz; 6–3, 2–6, 5–7, 6–1, 6–2	(Germany) Alexander Zverev	(Norway) Casper Ruud (Italy) Jannik Sinner	(Serbia) Novak Djokovic (Australia) Alex de Minaur (Greece) Stefanos Tsitsipas (Bulgaria) Grigor Dimitrov
27 May; 3 Jun	French Open; Paris, France; Grand Slam; Clay – €24,961,000 – 128S/128Q/64D/32X; Singles – Doubles – Mixed	(El Salvador) Marcelo Arévalo (Croatia) Mate Pavić; 7–5, 6–3	(Italy) Simone Bolelli (Italy) Andrea Vavassori	(Norway) Casper Ruud (Italy) Jannik Sinner	(Serbia) Novak Djokovic (Australia) Alex de Minaur (Greece) Stefanos Tsitsipas (Bulgaria) Grigor Dimitrov
27 May; 3 Jun	French Open; Paris, France; Grand Slam; Clay – €24,961,000 – 128S/128Q/64D/32X; Singles – Doubles – Mixed	(Germany) Laura Siegemund (France) Édouard Roger-Vasselin; 6–4, 7–5	(United States) Desirae Krawczyk (United Kingdom) Neal Skupski	(Norway) Casper Ruud (Italy) Jannik Sinner	(Serbia) Novak Djokovic (Australia) Alex de Minaur (Greece) Stefanos Tsitsipas (Bulgaria) Grigor Dimitrov

=== June ===
Week	Tournament	Champions	Runners-up	Semifinalists	Quarterfinalists
10 Jun	Stuttgart Open; Stuttgart, Germany; ATP 250; Grass – €812,235 – 28S/16Q/16D; Singles – Doubles	(United Kingdom) Jack Draper; 3–6, 7–6^{(7–5)}, 6–4	(Italy) Matteo Berrettini	(United States) Brandon Nakashima (Italy) Lorenzo Musetti	(Germany) Jan-Lennard Struff (United States) Frances Tiafoe (Kazakhstan) Alexander Bublik (Australia) James Duckworth
10 Jun	Stuttgart Open; Stuttgart, Germany; ATP 250; Grass – €812,235 – 28S/16Q/16D; Singles – Doubles	(Brazil) Rafael Matos (Brazil) Marcelo Melo; 3–6, 6–3, [10–8]	(United Kingdom) Julian Cash (United States) Robert Galloway	(United States) Brandon Nakashima (Italy) Lorenzo Musetti	(Germany) Jan-Lennard Struff (United States) Frances Tiafoe (Kazakhstan) Alexander Bublik (Australia) James Duckworth
10 Jun	Rosmalen Grass Court Championships 's-Hertogenbosch, Netherlands; ATP 250; Grass – €767,455 – 28S/16Q/16D; Singles – Doubles	(Australia) Alex de Minaur; 6–2, 6–4	(United States) Sebastian Korda	(France) Ugo Humbert (Netherlands) Tallon Griekspoor	(Canada) Milos Raonic (Netherlands) Gijs Brouwer (Australia) Aleksandar Vukic (United States) Tommy Paul
10 Jun	Rosmalen Grass Court Championships 's-Hertogenbosch, Netherlands; ATP 250; Grass – €767,455 – 28S/16Q/16D; Singles – Doubles	(United States) Nathaniel Lammons (United States) Jackson Withrow; 7–6^{(7–5)}, 7–6^{(7–3)}	(Netherlands) Wesley Koolhof (Croatia) Nikola Mektić	(France) Ugo Humbert (Netherlands) Tallon Griekspoor	(Canada) Milos Raonic (Netherlands) Gijs Brouwer (Australia) Aleksandar Vukic (United States) Tommy Paul
17 Jun	Halle Open; Halle, Germany; ATP 500; Grass – €2,411,390 – 32S/16Q/16D; Singles – Doubles	(Italy) Jannik Sinner; 7–6^{(10–8)}, 7–6^{(7–2)}	(Poland) Hubert Hurkacz	(China) Zhang Zhizhen (Germany) Alexander Zverev	(Germany) Jan-Lennard Struff (United States) Christopher Eubanks (United States) Marcos Giron (France) Arthur Fils
17 Jun	Halle Open; Halle, Germany; ATP 500; Grass – €2,411,390 – 32S/16Q/16D; Singles – Doubles	(Italy) Simone Bolelli (Italy) Andrea Vavassori; 7–6^{(7–3)}, 7–6^{(7–5)}	(Germany) Kevin Krawietz (Germany) Tim Pütz	(China) Zhang Zhizhen (Germany) Alexander Zverev	(Germany) Jan-Lennard Struff (United States) Christopher Eubanks (United States) Marcos Giron (France) Arthur Fils
17 Jun	Queen's Club Championships; London, United Kingdom; ATP 500; Grass – €2,411,390 – 32S/16Q/16D; Singles – Doubles	(United States) Tommy Paul; 6–1, 7–6^{(10–8)}	(Italy) Lorenzo Musetti	(United States) Sebastian Korda (Australia) Jordan Thompson	(United Kingdom) Jack Draper (Australia) Rinky Hijikata (United States) Taylor Fritz (United Kingdom) Billy Harris
17 Jun	Queen's Club Championships; London, United Kingdom; ATP 500; Grass – €2,411,390 – 32S/16Q/16D; Singles – Doubles	(United Kingdom) Neal Skupski (New Zealand) Michael Venus; 4–6, 7–6^{(7–5)}, [10–8]	(United States) Taylor Fritz; Karen Khachanov	(United States) Sebastian Korda (Australia) Jordan Thompson	(United Kingdom) Jack Draper (Australia) Rinky Hijikata (United States) Taylor Fritz (United Kingdom) Billy Harris
24 Jun	Mallorca Championships; Santa Ponsa, Spain; ATP 250; Grass – €1,005,340 – 28S/16Q/16D; Singles – Doubles	(Chile) Alejandro Tabilo; 6–3, 6–4	(Austria) Sebastian Ofner	(United Kingdom) Paul Jubb (France) Gaël Monfils	(United States) Ben Shelton (United States) Alex Michelsen (Czech Republic) Jakub Menšík (Spain) Roberto Bautista Agut
24 Jun	Mallorca Championships; Santa Ponsa, Spain; ATP 250; Grass – €1,005,340 – 28S/16Q/16D; Singles – Doubles	(United Kingdom) Julian Cash (United States) Robert Galloway; 6–4, 6–4	(Ecuador) Diego Hidalgo (Chile) Alejandro Tabilo	(United Kingdom) Paul Jubb (France) Gaël Monfils	(United States) Ben Shelton (United States) Alex Michelsen (Czech Republic) Jakub Menšík (Spain) Roberto Bautista Agut
24 Jun	Eastbourne International; Eastbourne, United Kingdom; ATP 250; Grass – €812,235 – 28S/16Q/16D; Singles – Doubles	(United States) Taylor Fritz; 6–4, 6–3	(Australia) Max Purcell	(Australia) Aleksandar Vukic (United Kingdom) Billy Harris	(China) Shang Juncheng (Japan) Yoshihito Nishioka (Serbia) Miomir Kecmanović (Italy) Flavio Cobolli
24 Jun	Eastbourne International; Eastbourne, United Kingdom; ATP 250; Grass – €812,235 – 28S/16Q/16D; Singles – Doubles	(United Kingdom) Neal Skupski (New Zealand) Michael Venus; 4–6, 7–6^{(7–2)}, [11–9]	(Australia) Matthew Ebden (Australia) John Peers	(Australia) Aleksandar Vukic (United Kingdom) Billy Harris	(China) Shang Juncheng (Japan) Yoshihito Nishioka (Serbia) Miomir Kecmanović (Italy) Flavio Cobolli

=== July ===
Week	Tournament	Champions	Runners-up	Semifinalists	Quarterfinalists
1 Jul; 8 Jul	Wimbledon; London, United Kingdom; Grand Slam; Grass – £23,232,000 – 128S/128Q/64D/32X; Singles – Doubles – Mixed	(Spain) Carlos Alcaraz; 6–2, 6–2, 7–6^{(7–4)}	(Serbia) Novak Djokovic	Daniil Medvedev (Italy) Lorenzo Musetti	(Italy) Jannik Sinner (United States) Tommy Paul (United States) Taylor Fritz (Australia) Alex de Minaur
1 Jul; 8 Jul	Wimbledon; London, United Kingdom; Grand Slam; Grass – £23,232,000 – 128S/128Q/64D/32X; Singles – Doubles – Mixed	(Finland) Harri Heliövaara (United Kingdom) Henry Patten; 6–7^{(7–9)}, 7–6^{(10–8)}, 7–6^{(11–9)}	(Australia) Max Purcell (Australia) Jordan Thompson	Daniil Medvedev (Italy) Lorenzo Musetti	(Italy) Jannik Sinner (United States) Tommy Paul (United States) Taylor Fritz (Australia) Alex de Minaur
1 Jul; 8 Jul	Wimbledon; London, United Kingdom; Grand Slam; Grass – £23,232,000 – 128S/128Q/64D/32X; Singles – Doubles – Mixed	(Poland) Jan Zielinski (Chinese Taipei) Hsieh Su-wei; 6–4, 6–2	(Mexico) Santiago González (Mexico) Giuliana Olmos	Daniil Medvedev (Italy) Lorenzo Musetti	(Italy) Jannik Sinner (United States) Tommy Paul (United States) Taylor Fritz (Australia) Alex de Minaur
15 Jul	Hamburg Open; Hamburg, Germany; ATP 500; Clay – €2,047,730 – 32S/16Q/16D; Singles – Doubles	(France) Arthur Fils; 6–3, 3–6, 7–6^{(7–1)}	(Germany) Alexander Zverev	(Spain) Pedro Martínez (Argentina) Sebastián Báez	(China) Zhang Zhizhen (Argentina) Francisco Cerúndolo (Italy) Luciano Darderi (Denmark) Holger Rune
15 Jul	Hamburg Open; Hamburg, Germany; ATP 500; Clay – €2,047,730 – 32S/16Q/16D; Singles – Doubles	(Germany) Kevin Krawietz (Germany) Tim Pütz; 7–6^{(10–8)}, 6–2	(France) Fabien Reboul (France) Édouard Roger-Vasselin	(Spain) Pedro Martínez (Argentina) Sebastián Báez	(China) Zhang Zhizhen (Argentina) Francisco Cerúndolo (Italy) Luciano Darderi (Denmark) Holger Rune
15 Jul	Hall of Fame Open; Newport, United States; ATP 250; Grass – $742,350 – 28S/16Q/16D; Singles – Doubles	(United States) Marcos Giron; 6–7^{(4–7)}, 6–3, 7–5	(United States) Alex Michelsen	(United States) Reilly Opelka (United States) Christopher Eubanks	(United States) Mackenzie McDonald (United States) Aleksandar Kovacevic (Australia) Aleksandar Vukic (Australia) Alex Bolt
15 Jul	Hall of Fame Open; Newport, United States; ATP 250; Grass – $742,350 – 28S/16Q/16D; Singles – Doubles	(Sweden) André Göransson (Netherlands) Sem Verbeek; 6–3, 6–4	(United States) Robert Cash (United States) James Tracy	(United States) Reilly Opelka (United States) Christopher Eubanks	(United States) Mackenzie McDonald (United States) Aleksandar Kovacevic (Australia) Aleksandar Vukic (Australia) Alex Bolt
15 Jul	Swedish Open; Båstad, Sweden; ATP 250; Clay – €651,865 – 28S/16Q/16D; Singles – Doubles	(Portugal) Nuno Borges; 6–3, 6–2	(Spain) Rafael Nadal	(Argentina) Thiago Agustín Tirante (Croatia) Duje Ajduković	(Spain) Roberto Carballés Baena (Kazakhstan) Timofey Skatov (Argentina) Mariano Navone (Brazil) Thiago Monteiro
15 Jul	Swedish Open; Båstad, Sweden; ATP 250; Clay – €651,865 – 28S/16Q/16D; Singles – Doubles	(Brazil) Orlando Luz (Brazil) Rafael Matos; 7–5, 6–4	(France) Manuel Guinard (France) Grégoire Jacq	(Argentina) Thiago Agustín Tirante (Croatia) Duje Ajduković	(Spain) Roberto Carballés Baena (Kazakhstan) Timofey Skatov (Argentina) Mariano Navone (Brazil) Thiago Monteiro
15 Jul	Swiss Open; Gstaad, Switzerland; ATP 250; Clay – €651,865 – 28S/16Q/16D; Singles – Doubles	(Italy) Matteo Berrettini; 6–3, 6–1	(France) Quentin Halys	(Greece) Stefanos Tsitsipas (Germany) Jan-Lennard Struff	(Italy) Fabio Fognini (Canada) Félix Auger-Aliassime (Argentina) Tomás Martín Etcheverry (Brazil) Gustavo Heide
15 Jul	Swiss Open; Gstaad, Switzerland; ATP 250; Clay – €651,865 – 28S/16Q/16D; Singles – Doubles	(India) Yuki Bhambri (France) Albano Olivetti; 3–6, 6–3, [10–6]	(France) Ugo Humbert (France) Fabrice Martin	(Greece) Stefanos Tsitsipas (Germany) Jan-Lennard Struff	(Italy) Fabio Fognini (Canada) Félix Auger-Aliassime (Argentina) Tomás Martín Etcheverry (Brazil) Gustavo Heide
22 Jul	Austrian Open; Kitzbühel, Austria; ATP 250; Clay – €651,865 – 28S/16Q/16D; Singles – Doubles	(Italy) Matteo Berrettini; 7–5, 6–3	(France) Hugo Gaston	(Argentina) Facundo Díaz Acosta (Germany) Yannick Hanfmann	(Argentina) Sebastián Báez (Spain) Pedro Martínez (Brazil) Thiago Seyboth Wild (United States) Nicolas Moreno de Alboran
22 Jul	Austrian Open; Kitzbühel, Austria; ATP 250; Clay – €651,865 – 28S/16Q/16D; Singles – Doubles	(Austria) Alexander Erler (Germany) Andreas Mies; 6–3, 3–6, [10–6]	(Germany) Constantin Frantzen (Germany) Hendrik Jebens	(Argentina) Facundo Díaz Acosta (Germany) Yannick Hanfmann	(Argentina) Sebastián Báez (Spain) Pedro Martínez (Brazil) Thiago Seyboth Wild (United States) Nicolas Moreno de Alboran
22 Jul	Croatia Open; Umag, Croatia; ATP 250; Clay – €651,865 – 28S/16Q/16D; Singles – Doubles	(Argentina) Francisco Cerúndolo; 2–6, 6–4, 7–6^{(7–5)}	(Italy) Lorenzo Musetti	Andrey Rublev (Czech Republic) Jakub Menšík	(Hungary) Fábián Marozsán (Italy) Lorenzo Sonego (Chinese Taipei) Tseng Chun-hsin (Serbia) Dušan Lajović
22 Jul	Croatia Open; Umag, Croatia; ATP 250; Clay – €651,865 – 28S/16Q/16D; Singles – Doubles	(Argentina) Guido Andreozzi (Mexico) Miguel Ángel Reyes-Varela; 6–4, 6–2	(France) Manuel Guinard (France) Grégoire Jacq	Andrey Rublev (Czech Republic) Jakub Menšík	(Hungary) Fábián Marozsán (Italy) Lorenzo Sonego (Chinese Taipei) Tseng Chun-hsin (Serbia) Dušan Lajović
22 Jul	Atlanta Open; Atlanta, United States; ATP 250; Hard – $841,590 – 28S/16Q/16D; Singles – Doubles	(Japan) Yoshihito Nishioka; 4–6, 7–6^{(7–2)}, 6–2	(Australia) Jordan Thompson	(China) Shang Juncheng (France) Arthur Rinderknech	(Australia) Max Purcell (Spain) Alejandro Davidovich Fokina (United States) Frances Tiafoe (Italy) Mattia Bellucci
22 Jul	Atlanta Open; Atlanta, United States; ATP 250; Hard – $841,590 – 28S/16Q/16D; Singles – Doubles	(United States) Nathaniel Lammons (United States) Jackson Withrow; 4–6, 6–4, [12–10]	(Sweden) André Göransson (Netherlands) Sem Verbeek	(China) Shang Juncheng (France) Arthur Rinderknech	(Australia) Max Purcell (Spain) Alejandro Davidovich Fokina (United States) Frances Tiafoe (Italy) Mattia Bellucci
29 Jul	Summer Olympics; Paris, France; Olympic Games; Clay – 64S/32D/16X; Singles – Doubles – Mixed	Gold	Silver	Bronze	Fourth Place
29 Jul	Summer Olympics; Paris, France; Olympic Games; Clay – 64S/32D/16X; Singles – Doubles – Mixed	(Serbia) Novak Djokovic; 7–6^{(7–3)}, 7–6^{(7–2)}	(Spain) Carlos Alcaraz	(Italy) Lorenzo Musetti; 6–4, 1–6, 6–3	(Canada) Félix Auger-Aliassime
29 Jul	Summer Olympics; Paris, France; Olympic Games; Clay – 64S/32D/16X; Singles – Doubles – Mixed	(Australia) Matthew Ebden (Australia) John Peers; 6–7^{(6–8)}, 7–6^{(7–1)}, [10–8]	(United States) Austin Krajicek (United States) Rajeev Ram	(United States) Taylor Fritz (United States) Tommy Paul; 6–3, 6–4	(Czech Republic) Tomáš Macháč (Czech Republic) Adam Pavlásek
29 Jul	Summer Olympics; Paris, France; Olympic Games; Clay – 64S/32D/16X; Singles – Doubles – Mixed	(Czech Republic) Kateřina Siniaková (Czech Republic) Tomáš Macháč; 6–2, 5–7, [10–8]	(China) Wang Xinyu (China) Zhang Zhizhen	(Canada) Gabriela Dabrowski (Canada) Félix Auger-Aliassime; 6–3, 7–6^{(7–2)}	(Netherlands) Demi Schuurs (Netherlands) Wesley Koolhof
29 Jul	Washington Open; Washington, D.C., United States; ATP 500; Hard – $2,271,715 – 48S/24Q/16D; Singles – Doubles	(United States) Sebastian Korda; 4–6, 6–2, 6–0	(Italy) Flavio Cobolli	(United States) Frances Tiafoe (United States) Ben Shelton	Andrey Rublev (Australia) Jordan Thompson (United States) Alex Michelsen (Canada) Denis Shapovalov
29 Jul	Washington Open; Washington, D.C., United States; ATP 500; Hard – $2,271,715 – 48S/24Q/16D; Singles – Doubles	(United States) Nathaniel Lammons (United States) Jackson Withrow; 7–5, 6–3	(Brazil) Rafael Matos (Brazil) Marcelo Melo	(United States) Frances Tiafoe (United States) Ben Shelton	Andrey Rublev (Australia) Jordan Thompson (United States) Alex Michelsen (Canada) Denis Shapovalov

=== August ===
Week	Tournament	Champions	Runners-up	Semifinalists	Quarterfinalists
5 Aug	Canadian Open; Montreal, Canada; ATP Masters 1000; Hard – $6,795,955 – 56S/28Q/28D; Singles – Doubles	(Australia) Alexei Popyrin; 6–2, 6–4	Andrey Rublev	(Italy) Matteo Arnaldi (United States) Sebastian Korda	(Italy) Jannik Sinner (Japan) Kei Nishikori (Poland) Hubert Hurkacz (Germany) Alexander Zverev
5 Aug	Canadian Open; Montreal, Canada; ATP Masters 1000; Hard – $6,795,955 – 56S/28Q/28D; Singles – Doubles	(Spain) Marcel Granollers (Argentina) Horacio Zeballos; 6–2, 7–6^{(7–4)}	(United States) Rajeev Ram (United Kingdom) Joe Salisbury	(Italy) Matteo Arnaldi (United States) Sebastian Korda	(Italy) Jannik Sinner (Japan) Kei Nishikori (Poland) Hubert Hurkacz (Germany) Alexander Zverev
12 Aug	Cincinnati Open; Mason, United States; ATP Masters 1000; Hard – $6,795,955 – 56S/28Q/28D; Singles – Doubles	(Italy) Jannik Sinner; 7–6^{(7–4)}, 6–2	(United States) Frances Tiafoe	(Germany) Alexander Zverev (Denmark) Holger Rune	Andrey Rublev (United States) Ben Shelton (Poland) Hubert Hurkacz (United Kingdom) Jack Draper
12 Aug	Cincinnati Open; Mason, United States; ATP Masters 1000; Hard – $6,795,955 – 56S/28Q/28D; Singles – Doubles	(El Salvador) Marcelo Arévalo (Croatia) Mate Pavić; 6–2, 6–4	(United States) Mackenzie McDonald (United States) Alex Michelsen	(Germany) Alexander Zverev (Denmark) Holger Rune	Andrey Rublev (United States) Ben Shelton (Poland) Hubert Hurkacz (United Kingdom) Jack Draper
19 Aug	Winston-Salem Open; Winston-Salem, United States; ATP 250; Hard – $867,750 – 48S/16Q/16D; Singles – Doubles	(Italy) Lorenzo Sonego; 6–0, 6–3	(United States) Alex Michelsen	(Belgium) David Goffin (Spain) Pablo Carreño Busta	(Australia) Rinky Hijikata; Pavel Kotov (United States) Learner Tien (United States) Christopher Eubanks
19 Aug	Winston-Salem Open; Winston-Salem, United States; ATP 250; Hard – $867,750 – 48S/16Q/16D; Singles – Doubles	(United States) Nathaniel Lammons (United States) Jackson Withrow; 6–4, 6–3	(United Kingdom) Julian Cash (United States) Robert Galloway	(Belgium) David Goffin (Spain) Pablo Carreño Busta	(Australia) Rinky Hijikata; Pavel Kotov (United States) Learner Tien (United States) Christopher Eubanks
26 Aug; 2 Sep	US Open; New York City, United States; Grand Slam; Hard – $33,977,000 – 128S/128Q/64D/32X; Singles - Doubles – Mixed	(Italy) Jannik Sinner; 6–3, 6–4, 7–5	(United States) Taylor Fritz	(United Kingdom) Jack Draper (United States) Frances Tiafoe	Daniil Medvedev (Australia) Alex de Minaur (Germany) Alexander Zverev (Bulgaria) Grigor Dimitrov
26 Aug; 2 Sep	US Open; New York City, United States; Grand Slam; Hard – $33,977,000 – 128S/128Q/64D/32X; Singles - Doubles – Mixed	(Australia) Max Purcell (Australia) Jordan Thompson; 6–4, 7–6^{(7–4)}	(Germany) Kevin Krawietz (Germany) Tim Pütz	(United Kingdom) Jack Draper (United States) Frances Tiafoe	Daniil Medvedev (Australia) Alex de Minaur (Germany) Alexander Zverev (Bulgaria) Grigor Dimitrov
26 Aug; 2 Sep	US Open; New York City, United States; Grand Slam; Hard – $33,977,000 – 128S/128Q/64D/32X; Singles - Doubles – Mixed	(Italy) Andrea Vavassori (Italy) Sara Errani; 7–6^{(7–0)}, 7–5	(United States) Taylor Townsend (United States) Donald Young	(United Kingdom) Jack Draper (United States) Frances Tiafoe	Daniil Medvedev (Australia) Alex de Minaur (Germany) Alexander Zverev (Bulgaria) Grigor Dimitrov

=== September ===
Week	Tournament	Champions	Runners-up	Semifinalists	Quarterfinalists
9 Sep	Davis Cup Finals group stage Bologna, Italy; Valencia, Spain; Zhuhai, China; Manchester, Great Britain; Hard (i) – 16 teams	Italy; Spain; United States; Canada	Netherlands; Australia; Germany; Argentina		
16 Sep	Laver Cup; Berlin, Germany; Hard (i) – $	Team Europe; 13–11	Team World		
16 Sep	Chengdu Open; Chengdu, China; ATP 250; Hard – $1,269,245 – 28S/16Q/16D; Singles – Doubles	(China) Shang Juncheng; 7–6^{(7–4)}, 6–1	(Italy) Lorenzo Musetti	Alibek Kachmazov (Germany) Yannick Hanfmann	(France) Adrian Mannarino (Chile) Nicolás Jarry (Spain) Pedro Martínez (Kazakhstan) Alexander Bublik
16 Sep	Chengdu Open; Chengdu, China; ATP 250; Hard – $1,269,245 – 28S/16Q/16D; Singles – Doubles	(France) Sadio Doumbia (France) Fabien Reboul; 6–4, 4–6, [10–4]	(India) Yuki Bhambri (France) Albano Olivetti	Alibek Kachmazov (Germany) Yannick Hanfmann	(France) Adrian Mannarino (Chile) Nicolás Jarry (Spain) Pedro Martínez (Kazakhstan) Alexander Bublik
16 Sep	Hangzhou Open; Hangzhou, China; ATP 250; Hard – $1,081,395 – 28S/16Q/16D; Singles – Doubles	(Croatia) Marin Čilić; 7–6^{(7–5)}, 7–6^{(7–5)}	(China) Zhang Zhizhen	(United States) Brandon Nakashima (China) Bu Yunchaokete	(Japan) Yasutaka Uchiyama (Australia) Rinky Hijikata (Spain) Roberto Carballés Baena (Kazakhstan) Mikhail Kukushkin
16 Sep	Hangzhou Open; Hangzhou, China; ATP 250; Hard – $1,081,395 – 28S/16Q/16D; Singles – Doubles	(India) Jeevan Nedunchezhiyan (India) Vijay Sundar Prashanth; 4–6, 7–6^{(7–5)}, [10–7]	(Germany) Constantin Frantzen (Germany) Hendrik Jebens	(United States) Brandon Nakashima (China) Bu Yunchaokete	(Japan) Yasutaka Uchiyama (Australia) Rinky Hijikata (Spain) Roberto Carballés Baena (Kazakhstan) Mikhail Kukushkin
23 Sep	China Open; Beijing, China; ATP 500; Hard – $3,891,650 – 32S/16Q/16D; Singles – Doubles	(Spain) Carlos Alcaraz; 6–7^{(6–8)}, 6–4, 7–6^{(7–3)}	(Italy) Jannik Sinner	(China) Bu Yunchaokete; Daniil Medvedev	(Czech Republic) Jiří Lehečka; Andrey Rublev (Italy) Flavio Cobolli; Karen Khachanov
23 Sep	China Open; Beijing, China; ATP 500; Hard – $3,891,650 – 32S/16Q/16D; Singles – Doubles	(Italy) Simone Bolelli (Italy) Andrea Vavassori; 4–6, 6–3, [10–5]	(Finland) Harri Heliövaara (United Kingdom) Henry Patten	(China) Bu Yunchaokete; Daniil Medvedev	(Czech Republic) Jiří Lehečka; Andrey Rublev (Italy) Flavio Cobolli; Karen Khachanov
23 Sep	Japan Open; Tokyo, Japan; ATP 500; Hard – $1,989,865 – 32S/16Q/16D; Singles – Doubles	(France) Arthur Fils; 5–7, 7–6^{(8–6)}, 6–3	(France) Ugo Humbert	(Denmark) Holger Rune (Czech Republic) Tomáš Macháč	(United States) Ben Shelton (Japan) Kei Nishikori (United States) Alex Michelsen (United Kingdom) Jack Draper
23 Sep	Japan Open; Tokyo, Japan; ATP 500; Hard – $1,989,865 – 32S/16Q/16D; Singles – Doubles	(United Kingdom) Julian Cash (United Kingdom) Lloyd Glasspool; 6–4, 4–6, [12–10]	(Uruguay) Ariel Behar (United States) Robert Galloway	(Denmark) Holger Rune (Czech Republic) Tomáš Macháč	(United States) Ben Shelton (Japan) Kei Nishikori (United States) Alex Michelsen (United Kingdom) Jack Draper
30 Sep; 7 Oct	Shanghai Masters; Shanghai, China; ATP Masters 1000; Hard – $8,995,955 – 96S/48Q/32D; Singles – Doubles	(Italy) Jannik Sinner; 7–6^{(7–4)}, 6–3	(Serbia) Novak Djokovic	(Czech Republic) Tomáš Macháč (United States) Taylor Fritz	Daniil Medvedev (Spain) Carlos Alcaraz (Czech Republic) Jakub Menšík (Belgium) David Goffin
30 Sep; 7 Oct	Shanghai Masters; Shanghai, China; ATP Masters 1000; Hard – $8,995,955 – 96S/48Q/32D; Singles – Doubles	(Netherlands) Wesley Koolhof (Croatia) Nikola Mektić; 6–4, 6–4	(Argentina) Máximo González (Argentina) Andrés Molteni	(Czech Republic) Tomáš Macháč (United States) Taylor Fritz	Daniil Medvedev (Spain) Carlos Alcaraz (Czech Republic) Jakub Menšík (Belgium) David Goffin

=== October ===
Week	Tournament	Champions	Runners-up	Semifinalists	Quarterfinalists
14 Oct	Almaty Open; Almaty, Kazakhstan; ATP 250; Hard (i) – $1,117,465 – 28S/16Q/16D; Singles – Doubles	Karen Khachanov; 6–2, 5–7, 6–3	(Canada) Gabriel Diallo	(Australia) Aleksandar Vukic (Argentina) Francisco Cerúndolo	(United States) Frances Tiafoe (Kazakhstan) Beibit Zhukayev (Kazakhstan) Alexander Shevchenko (Chile) Alejandro Tabilo
14 Oct	Almaty Open; Almaty, Kazakhstan; ATP 250; Hard (i) – $1,117,465 – 28S/16Q/16D; Singles – Doubles	(India) Rithvik Choudary Bollipalli (India) Arjun Kadhe; 3–6, 7–6^{(7–3)}, [14–12]	(Colombia) Nicolás Barrientos (Tunisia) Skander Mansouri	(Australia) Aleksandar Vukic (Argentina) Francisco Cerúndolo	(United States) Frances Tiafoe (Kazakhstan) Beibit Zhukayev (Kazakhstan) Alexander Shevchenko (Chile) Alejandro Tabilo
14 Oct	European Open; Antwerp, Belgium; ATP 250; Hard (i) – €767,455 – 28S/16Q/16D; Singles – Doubles	(Spain) Roberto Bautista Agut; 7–5, 6–1	(Czech Republic) Jiří Lehečka	(France) Hugo Gaston (United States) Marcos Giron	(Australia) Alex de Minaur (Canada) Félix Auger-Aliassime (Belgium) Zizou Bergs (Greece) Stefanos Tsitsipas
14 Oct	European Open; Antwerp, Belgium; ATP 250; Hard (i) – €767,455 – 28S/16Q/16D; Singles – Doubles	(Austria) Alexander Erler (Austria) Lucas Miedler; 6–4, 1–6, [10–8]	(United States) Robert Galloway (Kazakhstan) Aleksandr Nedovyesov	(France) Hugo Gaston (United States) Marcos Giron	(Australia) Alex de Minaur (Canada) Félix Auger-Aliassime (Belgium) Zizou Bergs (Greece) Stefanos Tsitsipas
14 Oct	Stockholm Open; Stockholm, Sweden; ATP 250; Hard (i) – €767,455 – 28S/16Q/16D; Singles – Doubles	(United States) Tommy Paul; 6–4, 6–3	(Bulgaria) Grigor Dimitrov	(Switzerland) Stan Wawrinka (Netherlands) Tallon Griekspoor	Andrey Rublev (Serbia) Miomir Kecmanović (Switzerland) Dominic Stricker (Norway) Casper Ruud
14 Oct	Stockholm Open; Stockholm, Sweden; ATP 250; Hard (i) – €767,455 – 28S/16Q/16D; Singles – Doubles	(Finland) Harri Heliövaara (United Kingdom) Henry Patten; 7–5, 6–3	(Czech Republic) Petr Nouza (Czech Republic) Patrik Rikl	(Switzerland) Stan Wawrinka (Netherlands) Tallon Griekspoor	Andrey Rublev (Serbia) Miomir Kecmanović (Switzerland) Dominic Stricker (Norway) Casper Ruud
21 Oct	Swiss Indoors; Basel, Switzerland; ATP 500; Hard (i) – €2,414,215 – 32S/16Q/16D; Singles – Doubles	(France) Giovanni Mpetshi Perricard; 6–4, 7–6^{(7–4)}	(United States) Ben Shelton	(France) Arthur Fils (Denmark) Holger Rune	Andrey Rublev (Greece) Stefanos Tsitsipas (Belgium) David Goffin (Canada) Denis Shapovalov
21 Oct	Swiss Indoors; Basel, Switzerland; ATP 500; Hard (i) – €2,414,215 – 32S/16Q/16D; Singles – Doubles	(United Kingdom) Jamie Murray (Australia) John Peers; 6–3, 7–5	(Netherlands) Wesley Koolhof (Croatia) Nikola Mektić	(France) Arthur Fils (Denmark) Holger Rune	Andrey Rublev (Greece) Stefanos Tsitsipas (Belgium) David Goffin (Canada) Denis Shapovalov
21 Oct	Vienna Open; Vienna, Austria; ATP 500; Hard (i) – €2,626,045 – 32S/16Q/16D; Singles – Doubles	(United Kingdom) Jack Draper; 6–4, 7–5	Karen Khachanov	(Italy) Lorenzo Musetti (Australia) Alex de Minaur	(Germany) Alexander Zverev (Czech Republic) Tomáš Macháč (Italy) Matteo Berrettini (Czech Republic) Jakub Menšík
21 Oct	Vienna Open; Vienna, Austria; ATP 500; Hard (i) – €2,626,045 – 32S/16Q/16D; Singles – Doubles	(Austria) Alexander Erler (Austria) Lucas Miedler; 4–6, 6–3, [10–1]	(United Kingdom) Neal Skupski (New Zealand) Michael Venus	(Italy) Lorenzo Musetti (Australia) Alex de Minaur	(Germany) Alexander Zverev (Czech Republic) Tomáš Macháč (Italy) Matteo Berrettini (Czech Republic) Jakub Menšík
28 Oct	Paris Masters; Paris, France; ATP Masters 1000; Hard (i) – €5,950,575 – 56S/28Q/24D; Singles – Doubles	(Germany) Alexander Zverev; 6–2, 6–2	(France) Ugo Humbert	(Denmark) Holger Rune; Karen Khachanov	(Australia) Alex de Minaur (Greece) Stefanos Tsitsipas (Bulgaria) Grigor Dimitrov (Australia) Jordan Thompson
28 Oct	Paris Masters; Paris, France; ATP Masters 1000; Hard (i) – €5,950,575 – 56S/28Q/24D; Singles – Doubles	(Netherlands) Wesley Koolhof (Croatia) Nikola Mektić; 3–6, 6–3, [10–5]	(United Kingdom) Lloyd Glasspool (Czech Republic) Adam Pavlásek	(Denmark) Holger Rune; Karen Khachanov	(Australia) Alex de Minaur (Greece) Stefanos Tsitsipas (Bulgaria) Grigor Dimitrov (Australia) Jordan Thompson

=== November ===
Week	Tournament	Champions	Runners-up	Semifinalists	Quarterfinalists
4 Nov	Belgrade Open; Belgrade, Serbia; ATP 250; Hard (i) – €651,865 – 28S/16Q/16D; Singles – Doubles	(Canada) Denis Shapovalov; 6–4, 6–4	(Serbia) Hamad Medjedovic	(Serbia) Laslo Djere (Czech Republic) Jiří Lehečka	(Hungary) Fábián Marozsán (Argentina) Francisco Cerúndolo (Slovakia) Lukáš Klein (Australia) Christopher O'Connell
4 Nov	Belgrade Open; Belgrade, Serbia; ATP 250; Hard (i) – €651,865 – 28S/16Q/16D; Singles – Doubles	(United Kingdom) Jamie Murray (Australia) John Peers; 3–6, 7–6^{(7–5)}, [11–9]	(Croatia) Ivan Dodig (Tunisia) Skander Mansouri	(Serbia) Laslo Djere (Czech Republic) Jiří Lehečka	(Hungary) Fábián Marozsán (Argentina) Francisco Cerúndolo (Slovakia) Lukáš Klein (Australia) Christopher O'Connell
4 Nov	Moselle Open; Metz, France; ATP 250; Hard (i) – €651,865 – 28S/16Q/16D; Singles – Doubles	(France) Benjamin Bonzi; 7–6^{(8–6)}, 6–4	(United Kingdom) Cameron Norrie	(France) Corentin Moutet (United States) Alex Michelsen	Andrey Rublev (Belgium) Zizou Bergs (China) Bu Yunchaokete (France) Quentin Halys
4 Nov	Moselle Open; Metz, France; ATP 250; Hard (i) – €651,865 – 28S/16Q/16D; Singles – Doubles	(Netherlands) Sander Arends (United Kingdom) Luke Johnson; 6–4, 3–6, [10–3]	(France) Pierre-Hugues Herbert (France) Albano Olivetti	(France) Corentin Moutet (United States) Alex Michelsen	Andrey Rublev (Belgium) Zizou Bergs (China) Bu Yunchaokete (France) Quentin Halys
11 Nov	ATP Finals; Turin, Italy; ATP Finals; Hard (i) – $15,250,000 – 8S/8D (RR); Singles – Doubles	(Italy) Jannik Sinner; 6–4, 6–4	(United States) Taylor Fritz	(Norway) Casper Ruud (Germany) Alexander Zverev	Round robin Daniil Medvedev (Australia) Alex de Minaur (Spain) Carlos Alcaraz; Andrey Rublev
11 Nov	ATP Finals; Turin, Italy; ATP Finals; Hard (i) – $15,250,000 – 8S/8D (RR); Singles – Doubles	(Germany) Kevin Krawietz (Germany) Tim Pütz; 7–6^{(7–5)}, 7–6^{(8–6)}	(El Salvador) Marcelo Arévalo (Croatia) Mate Pavić	(Norway) Casper Ruud (Germany) Alexander Zverev	Round robin Daniil Medvedev (Australia) Alex de Minaur (Spain) Carlos Alcaraz; Andrey Rublev
18 Nov	Davis Cup Finals knockout stage Málaga, Spain; Hard (i)	Italy; 2–0	Netherlands	Australia; Germany	Argentina; United States; Canada; Spain

=== December ===
Week	Tournament	Champions	Runners-up	Semifinalists	Quarterfinalists
16 Dec	Next Gen ATP Finals; Jeddah, Saudi Arabia; Next Generation ATP Finals; Hard (i) – $ – 8S (RR); Singles	(Brazil) João Fonseca; 2–4, 4–3^{(10–8)}, 4–0, 4–2	(United States) Learner Tien	(France) Luca Van Assche (United States) Alex Michelsen	Round robin (France) Arthur Fils (Czech Republic) Jakub Menšík (United States) Nishesh Basavareddy (China) Shang Juncheng

=== Cancelled tournaments ===
Week	Tournament	Reason
4 Nov	Gijón Open; Gijón, Spain; ATP 250; Hard (i) – € – 28S/16Q/16D; Singles – Doubles	Cancelled due to operational reasons

== Statistical information ==
These tables present the number of singles (S), doubles (D), and mixed doubles (X) titles won by each player and each nation during the season, within all the tournament categories of the 2024 calendar: the Grand Slam tournaments, the tennis event at the Paris Summer Olympics, the ATP Finals, the ATP Masters 1000, the ATP 500 tournaments, and the ATP 250 tournaments. The players/nations are sorted by:

1. Total number of titles (a doubles title won by two players representing the same nation counts as only one win for the nation);
2. Cumulated importance of those titles (one Grand Slam win equalling two Masters 1000 wins, one undefeated ATP Finals win equalling one-and-a-half Masters 1000 win, one Masters 1000 win equalling two 500 events wins, one 500 event win equalling two 250 events wins);
3. A singles > doubles > mixed doubles hierarchy;
4. Alphabetical order (by family names for players).

Key
Grand Slam
Summer Olympics
ATP Finals
ATP Masters 1000
ATP 500
ATP 250

=== Titles won by player ===
Total	Player	Grand Slam			Olympic Games			ATP Finals		Masters 1000		ATP 500		ATP 250		Total		
Total	Player	S	D	X	S	D	X	S	D	S	D	S	D	S	D	S	D	X
8	Jannik Sinner (ITA)	● ●						●		● ● ●		● ●				8	0	0
6	Jordan Thompson (AUS)		●								●			●	● ● ●	1	5	0
5	Wesley Koolhof (NED)										● ● ●		●		●	0	5	0
5	Nikola Mektić (CRO)										● ● ●		●		●	0	5	0
4	Carlos Alcaraz (ESP)	● ●								●		●				4	0	0
4	Marcelo Arévalo (ESA)		●								●				● ●	0	4	0
4	Mate Pavić (CRO)		●								●				● ●	0	4	0
4	Andrea Vavassori (ITA)			●									● ●		●	0	3	1
4	Harri Heliövaara (FIN)		●												● ● ●	0	4	0
4	Henry Patten (GBR)		●												● ● ●	0	4	0
4	Max Purcell (AUS)		●												● ● ●	0	4	0
4	Nathaniel Lammons (USA)												●		● ● ●	0	4	0
4	Jackson Withrow (USA)												●		● ● ●	0	4	0
3	Jan Zieliński (POL)			● ●									●			0	1	2
3	Matthew Ebden (AUS)		●			●					●					0	3	0
3	John Peers (AUS)					●							●		●	0	3	0
3	Simone Bolelli (ITA)												● ●		●	0	3	0
3	Tommy Paul (USA)											●		● ●		3	0	0
3	Julian Cash (GBR)												●		● ●	0	3	0
3	Alexander Erler (AUT)												●		● ●	0	3	0
3	Rafael Matos (BRA)												●		● ●	0	3	0
3	Jamie Murray (GBR)												●		● ●	0	3	0
3	Michael Venus (NZL)												●		● ●	0	3	0
3	Matteo Berrettini (ITA)													● ● ●		3	0	0
3	Alejandro Tabilo (CHI)													● ●	●	2	1	0
3	Sadio Doumbia (FRA)														● ● ●	0	3	0
3	Fabien Reboul (FRA)														● ● ●	0	3	0
2	Rohan Bopanna (IND)		●								●					0	2	0
2	Tomáš Macháč (CZE)						●								●	0	1	1
2	Kevin Krawietz (GER)								●				●			0	2	0
2	Tim Pütz (GER)								●				●			0	2	0
2	Alexander Zverev (GER)									● ●						2	0	0
2	Marcel Granollers (ESP)										● ●					0	2	0
2	Horacio Zeballos (ARG)										● ●					0	2	0
2	Sebastian Korda (USA)										●	●				1	1	0
2	Andrey Rublev (Note: As of 1 March 2022, the ATP announced that players from Russia and Belarus will not compete in tournaments under the name or flag of Russia or Belarus due to the Russian invasion of Ukraine.)									●				●		2	0	0
2	Arthur Fils (FRA)											● ●				2	0	0
2	Sebastián Báez (ARG)											●		●		2	0	0
2	Alex de Minaur (AUS)											●		●		2	0	0
2	Jack Draper (GBR)											●		●		2	0	0
2	Ugo Humbert (FRA)											●		●		2	0	0
2	Giovanni Mpetshi Perricard (FRA)											●		●		2	0	0
2	Casper Ruud (NOR)											●		●		2	0	0
2	Jan-Lennard Struff (GER)												●	●		1	1	0
2	Lloyd Glasspool (GBR)												●		●	0	2	0
2	Máximo González (ARG)												●		●	0	2	0
2	Lucas Miedler (AUT)												●		●	0	2	0
2	Andrés Molteni (ARG)												●		●	0	2	0
2	Neal Skupski (GBR)												●		●	0	2	0
2	Taylor Fritz (USA)													● ●		2	0	0
2	Karen Khachanov													● ●		2	0	0
2	Yuki Bhambri (IND)														● ●	0	2	0
2	Robert Galloway (USA)														● ●	0	2	0
2	Albano Olivetti (FRA)														● ●	0	2	0
1	Édouard Roger-Vasselin (FRA)			●												0	0	1
1	Novak Djokovic (SRB)				●											1	0	0
1	Alexei Popyrin (AUS)									●						1	0	0
1	Stefanos Tsitsipas (GRE)									●						1	0	0
1	Sander Gillé (BEL)										●					0	1	0
1	Joran Vliegen (BEL)										●					0	1	0
1	Nicolás Barrientos (COL)												●			0	1	0
1	Tallon Griekspoor (NED)												●			0	1	0
1	Hugo Nys (MON)												●			0	1	0
1	Roberto Bautista Agut (ESP)													●		1	0	0
1	Benjamin Bonzi (FRA)													●		1	0	0
1	Nuno Borges (POR)													●		1	0	0
1	Alexander Bublik (KAZ)													●		1	0	0
1	Francisco Cerúndolo (ARG)													●		1	0	0
1	Marin Čilić (CRO)													●		1	0	0
1	Luciano Darderi (ITA)													●		1	0	0
1	Facundo Díaz Acosta (ARG)													●		1	0	0
1	Grigor Dimitrov (BUL)													●		1	0	0
1	Márton Fucsovics (HUN)													●		1	0	0
1	Marcos Giron (USA)													●		1	0	0
1	Hubert Hurkacz (POL)													●		1	0	0
1	Jiří Lehečka (CZE)													●		1	0	0
1	Yoshihito Nishioka (JPN)													●		1	0	0
1	Shang Juncheng (CHN)													●		1	0	0
1	Denis Shapovalov (CAN)													●		1	0	0
1	Ben Shelton (USA)													●		1	0	0
1	Lorenzo Sonego (ITA)													●		1	0	0
1	Guido Andreozzi (ARG)														●	0	1	0
1	Sander Arends (NED)														●	0	1	0
1	Tomás Barrios Vera (CHI)														●	0	1	0
1	Rithvik Choudary Bollipalli (IND)														●	0	1	0
1	Gonzalo Escobar (ECU)														●	0	1	0
1	André Göransson (SWE)														●	0	1	0
1	Luke Johnson (GBR)														●	0	1	0
1	Arjun Kadhe (IND)														●	0	1	0
1	Orlando Luz (BRA)														●	0	1	0
1	Marcelo Melo (BRA)														●	0	1	0
1	Andreas Mies (GER)														●	0	1	0
1	Aleksandr Nedovyesov (KAZ)														●	0	1	0
1	Jeevan Nedunchezhiyan (IND)														●	0	1	0
1	Vijay Sundar Prashanth (IND)														●	0	1	0
1	Rajeev Ram (USA)														●	0	1	0
1	Miguel Ángel Reyes-Varela (MEX)														●	0	1	0
1	Jean-Julien Rojer (NED)														●	0	1	0
1	Joe Salisbury (GBR)														●	0	1	0
1	Sem Verbeek (NED)														●	0	1	0
1	Zhang Zhizhen (CHN)														●	0	1	0

=== Titles won by nation ===
Total	Nation	Grand Slam			Olympic Games			ATP Finals		Masters 1000		ATP 500		ATP 250		Total		
Total	Nation	S	D	X	S	D	X	S	D	S	D	S	D	S	D	S	D	X
17	Italy (ITA)	2		1				1		3		2	2	5	1	13	3	1
17	Great Britain (GBR)		1									1	3	1	11	2	15	0
16	United States (USA)										1	2	1	6	6	8	8	0
14	Australia (AUS)		2			1				1	2	1	1	2	4	4	10	0
13	France (FRA)			1								4		3	5	7	5	1
10	Croatia (CRO)		1								4		1	1	3	1	9	0
9	Netherlands (NED)										3		2		4	0	9	0
9	Argentina (ARG)										2	1	1	3	2	4	5	0
7	Spain (ESP)	2								1	2	1		1		5	2	0
7	Germany (GER)								1	2			2	1	1	3	4	0
6	India (IND)		1								1				4	0	6	0
4	Poland (POL)			2									1	1		1	1	2
4	El Salvador (ESA)		1								1				2	0	4	0
4	Finland (FIN)		1												3	0	4	0
3	Czech Republic (CZE)						1							1	1	1	1	1
3	Austria (AUT)												1		2	0	3	0
3	Brazil (BRA)												1		2	0	3	0
3	New Zealand (NZL)												1		2	0	3	0
3	Chile (CHI)													2	1	2	1	0
2	Norway (NOR)											1		1		2	0	0
2	China (CHN)													1	1	1	1	0
2	Kazakhstan (KAZ)													1	1	1	1	0
1	Serbia (SRB)				1											1	0	0
1	Greece (GRE)									1						1	0	0
1	Belgium (BEL)										1					0	1	0
1	Colombia (COL)												1			0	1	0
1	Monaco (MON)												1			0	1	0
1	Bulgaria (BUL)													1		1	0	0
1	Canada (CAN)													1		1	0	0
1	Hungary (HUN)													1		1	0	0
1	Japan (JPN)													1		1	0	0
1	Portugal (POR)													1		1	0	0
1	Ecuador (ECU)														1	0	1	0
1	Mexico (MEX)														1	0	1	0
1	Sweden (SWE)														1	0	1	0

=== Titles information ===
The following players won their first main circuit title in singles, doubles or mixed doubles:

Singles

- (Chile) Alejandro Tabilo (26 years, 7 months and 11 days) – Auckland (draw)
- (Czech Republic) Jiří Lehečka (22 years, 2 months and 5 days) – Adelaide (draw)
- (Italy) Luciano Darderi (21 years, 11 months and 28 days) – Córdoba (draw)
- (Argentina) Facundo Díaz Acosta (23 years, 2 months and 3 days) – Buenos Aires (draw)
- (Australia) Jordan Thompson (29 years, 10 months and 5 days) – Los Cabos (draw)
- (Germany) Jan-Lennard Struff (33 years, 11 months and 27 days) – Munich (draw)
- (France) Giovanni Mpetshi Perricard (20 years, 10 months and 17 days) – Lyon (draw)
- (United Kingdom) Jack Draper (22 years, 5 months and 25 days) – Stuttgart (draw)
- (Portugal) Nuno Borges (27 years, 5 months and 2 days) – Båstad (draw)
- (United States) Marcos Giron (30 years, 11 months and 27 days) – Newport (draw)
- (China) Shang Juncheng (19 years, 7 months and 22 days) – Chengdu (draw)
- (France) Benjamin Bonzi (28 years, 5 months and 1 day) – Metz (draw)

Doubles

- (Czech Republic) Tomáš Macháč (23 years, 3 months and 29 days) – Marseille (draw)
- (China) Zhang Zhizhen (27 years, 3 months and 26 days) – Marseille (draw)
- (United Kingdom) Julian Cash (27 years, 5 months and 21 days) – Delray Beach (draw)
- (United States) Robert Galloway (31 years, 4 months and 26 days) – Delray Beach (draw)
- (Colombia) Nicolás Barrientos (36 years, 10 months and 1 day) – Rio de Janeiro (draw)
- (Chile) Tomás Barrios Vera (26 years, 4 months and 19 days) – Santiago (draw)
- (Chile) Alejandro Tabilo (26 years and 9 months) – Santiago (draw)
- (United Kingdom) Henry Patten (27 years and 11 months) – Marrakesh (draw)
- (France) Albano Olivetti (32 years, 4 months and 28 days) – Munich (draw)
- (United States) Sebastian Korda (23 years, 9 months and 29 days) – Madrid (draw)
- (Brazil) Orlando Luz (26 years, 5 months and 13 days) – Båstad (draw)
- (Netherlands) Sem Verbeek (30 years, 3 months and 9 days) – Newport (draw)
- (Argentina) Guido Andreozzi (32 years, 11 months and 24 days) – Umag (draw)
- (India) Vijay Sundar Prashanth (37 years, 10 months and 28 days) – Hangzhou (draw)
- (India) Rithvik Choudary Bollipalli (23 years, 9 months and 3 days) – Almaty (draw)
- (India) Arjun Kadhe (30 years, 9 months and 13 days) – Almaty (draw)
- (United Kingdom) Luke Johnson (30 years, 7 months and 22 days) – Metz (draw)

Mixed

- (Poland) Jan Zieliński (27 years, 2 months and 9 days) – **Australian Open** (draw)
- (France) Édouard Roger-Vasselin (40 years, 6 months and 9 days) – **French Open** (draw)
- (Czech Republic) Tomáš Macháč (23 years, 9 months and 20 days) – 2024 Summer Olympics (draw)
- (Italy) Andrea Vavassori (29 years and 4 months) – **US Open** (draw)

The following players defended a main circuit title in singles, doubles, or mixed doubles:

Singles

- (United States) Taylor Fritz – Delray Beach (draw)
- (Australia) Alex de Minaur – Acapulco (draw)
- (Spain) Carlos Alcaraz – Indian Wells (draw), **Wimbledon Championships (draw)**

Doubles

- (Croatia) Nikola Mektić – Auckland (draw)
- (Argentina) Andrés Molteni – Córdoba (draw), Barcelona (draw)
- (Argentina) Máximo González – Córdoba (draw), Barcelona (draw)
- (Italy) Simone Bolelli – Buenos Aires (draw)
- (Australia) Max Purcell – Houston (draw)
- (Australia) Jordan Thompson – Houston (draw)
- (Germany) Kevin Krawietz – Hamburg (draw)
- (Germany) Tim Pütz – Hamburg (draw)
- (Austria) Alexander Erler – Kitzbuhel (draw)
- (United States) Nathaniel Lammons – Atlanta (draw), Winston-Salem (draw)
- (United States) Jackson Withrow – Atlanta (draw), Winston-Salem (draw)
- (France) Sadio Doumbia – Chengdu (draw)
- (France) Fabien Reboul – Chengdu (draw)

=== Best ranking ===
The following players achieved their career-high ranking in this season inside top 50 (in bold the players who entered the top 10 or became the world No. 1 for the first time): (Note: Name and ranking in bold means the player entered the top 10 or became world No. 1 for the first time this year, and only the ranking in bold means the player had entered the top 10 in a previous season (before 2024) but reached a new career-high ranking this year.)

Singles

- Roman Safiullin (reached place No. 36 on 8 January)
- (Austria) Sebastian Ofner (reached place No. 37 on 8 January)
- (Czech Republic) Jiří Lehečka (reached place No. 23 on 15 January)
- (France) Adrian Mannarino (reached place No. 17 on 29 January)
- (Argentina) Tomás Martín Etcheverry (reached place No. 27 on 12 February)
- (Kazakhstan) Alexander Shevchenko (reached place No. 45 on 19 February)
- (Germany) Dominik Koepfer (reached place No. 49 on 4 March)
- (France) Ugo Humbert (reached place No. 13 on 15 April)
- (Argentina) Facundo Díaz Acosta (reached place No. 47 on 22 April)
- (Kazakhstan) Alexander Bublik (reached place No. 17 on 6 May)
- (Hungary) Fábián Marozsán (reached place No. 36 on 6 May)
- (Chile) Nicolás Jarry (reached place No. 16 on 20 May)
- (Italy) **Jannik Sinner** (reached place **No. 1** on 10 June)
- (Argentina) Mariano Navone (reached place No. 29 on 10 June)
- Pavel Kotov (reached place No. 50 on 17 June)
- (Argentina) Sebastián Báez (reached place No. 18 on 24 June)
- (Chile) Alejandro Tabilo (reached place No. 19 on 1 July)
- (Australia) **Alex de Minaur** (reached place **No. 6** on 15 July)
- (France) Arthur Fils (reached place No. 20 on 22 July)
- (China) Zhizhen Zhang (reached place No. 31 on 22 July)
- (Poland) Hubert Hurkacz (reached place **No. 6** on 5 August)
- (Italy) Luciano Darderi (reached place No. 32 on 5 August)
- (United States) Marcos Giron (reached place No. 37 on 5 August)
- (United States) Sebastian Korda (reached place No. 15 on 12 August)
- (Australia) Alexei Popyrin (reached place No. 23 on 12 August)
- (Italy) Matteo Arnaldi (reached place No. 30 on 12 August)
- (United States) Ben Shelton (reached place No. 13 on 19 August)
- (Portugal) Nuno Borges (reached place No. 30 on 9 September)
- (Italy) Flavio Cobolli (reached place No. 30 on 30 September)
- (United States) Brandon Nakashima (reached place No. 35 on 30 September)
- (United States) Alex Michelsen (reached place No. 43 on 30 September)
- (Czech Republic) Tomáš Macháč (reached place No. 25 on 14 October)
- (Spain) Pedro Martínez (reached place No. 39 on 14 October)
- (China) Shang Juncheng (reached place No. 47 on 21 October)
- (United Kingdom) Jack Draper (reached place No. 15 on 28 October)
- (Czech Republic) Jakub Menšík (reached place No. 48 on 28 October)
- (Australia) Jordan Thompson (reached place No. 26 on 4 November)
- (France) Giovanni Mpetshi Perricard (reached place No. 30 on 4 November)
- (United States) Taylor Fritz (reached place **No. 4** on 18 November)

Doubles

- (India) **Rohan Bopanna** (reached place **No. 1** on 29 January)
- (United States) Jackson Withrow (reached place No. 16 on 19 February)
- (Australia) **Matthew Ebden** (reached place **No. 1** on 26 February)
- (France) Sadio Doumbia (reached place No. 30 on 4 March)
- (Colombia) Nicolás Barrientos (reached place No. 47 on 22 April)
- (Spain) **Marcel Granollers** (reached place **No. 1** on 6 May)
- (Argentina) **Horacio Zeballos** (reached place **No. 1** on 6 May)
- (Uruguay) Ariel Behar (reached place No. 34 on 6 May)
- (Kazakhstan) Aleksandr Nedovyesov (reached place No. 38 on 20 May)
- (China) Zhizhen Zhang (reached place No. 47 on 15 July)
- (France) Albano Olivetti (reached place No. 40 on 22 July)
- (Germany) Hendrik Jebens (reached place No. 45 on 5 August)
- (Germany) Constantin Frantzen (reached place No. 45 on 12 August)
- (United Kingdom) Henry Patten (reached place No. 12 on 19 August)
- (Australia) **Max Purcell** (reached place **No. 8** on 9 September)
- (India) Yuki Bhambri (reached place No. 42 on 23 September)
- (France) Fabien Reboul (reached place No. 27 on 30 September)
- (United Kingdom) Julian Cash (reached place No. 32 on 30 September)
- (Czech Republic) Tomáš Macháč (reached place No. 46 on 30 September)
- (Italy) **Andrea Vavassori** (reached place **No. 6** on 14 October)
- (Czech Republic) Adam Pavlásek (reached place No. 29 on 4 November)
- (El Salvador) **Marcelo Arévalo** (reached place **No. 1** on 11 November)
- (United States) Nathaniel Lammons (reached place No. 19 on 11 November)
- (United States) Robert Galloway (reached place No. 34 on 11 November)
- (Australia) **Jordan Thompson** (reached place **No. 3** on 18 November)

== ATP rankings ==
=== Singles ===
Finals Singles Race rankings
No.	Player	Points	Tourn
1	Jannik Sinner (ITA) ✓	10,330	14
2	Alexander Zverev (GER) ✓	7,315	20
3	Carlos Alcaraz (ESP) ✓	6,810	14
4	Daniil Medvedev ✓	4,830	16
5	Taylor Fritz (USA) ✓	4,300	21
6	Novak Djokovic (SRB)	3,910	10
7	Casper Ruud (NOR) ✓	3,855	24
8	Andrey Rublev ✓	3,760	26
9	Alex de Minaur (AUS) ✓	3,745	18
10	Grigor Dimitrov (BUL)	3,350	19
11	Stefanos Tsitsipas (GRE)	3,165	22
12	Tommy Paul (USA)	3,145	20
13	Holger Rune (DEN)	3,025	23
14	Ugo Humbert (FRA)	2,765	24
15	Jack Draper (GBR)	2,685	21
16	Hubert Hurkacz (POL)	2,640	18
17	Lorenzo Musetti (ITA)	2,600	27
18	Frances Tiafoe (USA)	2,585	25
19	Karen Khachanov	2,410	24
20	Arthur Fils (FRA)	2,355	25

✓ Qualified for the 2024 ATP Finals.

Year-end rankings 2024 (30 December 2024)
#	Player	Points	#Trn	'23 Rk	High	Low	'23→'24
1	Jannik Sinner (ITA)	11,830	17	4	1	4	▲3
2	Alexander Zverev (GER)	7,915	21	7	2	7	▲5
3	Carlos Alcaraz (ESP)	7,010	18	2	2	3	▼1
4	Taylor Fritz (USA)	5,100	22	10	4	15	▲6
5	Daniil Medvedev	5,030	17	3	3	5	▼2
6	Casper Ruud (NOR)	4,255	25	11	6	12	▲5
7	Novak Djokovic (SRB)	3,910	18	1	1	7	▼6
8	Andrey Rublev	3,760	27	5	5	9	▼3
9	Alex de Minaur (AUS)	3,745	23	12	6	12	▲3
10	Grigor Dimitrov (BUL)	3,350	19	14	9	14	▲4
11	Stefanos Tsitsipas (GRE)	3,165	22	6	6	12	▼5
12	Tommy Paul (USA)	3,145	21	13	12	17	▲1
13	Holger Rune (DEN)	3,025	23	8	7	17	▼5
14	Ugo Humbert (FRA)	2,765	26	20	13	21	▲6
15	Jack Draper (GBR)	2,685	22	61	15	62	▲46
16	Hubert Hurkacz (POL)	2,640	20	9	6	16	▼7
17	Lorenzo Musetti (ITA)	2,600	29	27	16	31	▲10
18	Frances Tiafoe (USA)	2,585	26	16	14	30	▼2
19	Karen Khachanov	2,410	24	15	15	27	▼4
20	Arthur Fils (FRA)	2,355	26	36	20	44	▲16

==== No. 1 ranking ====
Holder	Date gained	Date forfeited
Novak Djokovic (SRB)	Year end 2023	9 June 2024
Jannik Sinner (ITA)	10 June 2024	Year end 2024

=== Doubles ===
Final Doubles Race rankings
No.	Team	Points	Tourn
1	Marcelo Arévalo (ESA); Mate Pavić (CRO) ✓	6,710	22
2	Marcel Granollers (ESP); Horacio Zeballos (ARG) ✓	6,500	17
3	Wesley Koolhof (NED); Nikola Mektić (CRO) ✓	5,775	21
4	Simone Bolelli (ITA); Andrea Vavassori (ITA) ✓	5,740	18
5	Max Purcell (AUS); Jordan Thompson (AUS) ✓	5,455	16
6	Rohan Bopanna (IND); Matthew Ebden (AUS) ✓	4,860	16
7	Harri Heliövaara (FIN); Henry Patten (GBR) ✓	4,787	19
8	Kevin Krawietz (GER); Tim Pütz (GER) ✓	4,690	18
9	Nathaniel Lammons (USA); Jackson Withrow (USA)	3,680	34
10	Máximo González (ARG); Andrés Molteni (ARG)	3,105	19

Year-end rankings 2024 (2 December 2024)
#	Player	Points	#Trn	'23 Rk	High	Low	'23→'24
1	Marcelo Arévalo (ESA)	7,510	23	19	1	23	▲18
=	Mate Pavić (CRO)	7,510	23	32	1	33	▲31
3	Jordan Thompson (AUS)	6,655	22	106	3	106	▲103
4	Marcel Granollers (ESP)	6,500	18	10	1	12	▲6
=	Horacio Zeballos (ARG)	6,500	18	5	1	11	▲1
6	Nikola Mektić (CRO)	5,930	24	43	6	43	▲37
7	Kevin Krawietz (GER)	5,880	20	21	7	22	▲14
8	Wesley Koolhof (NED)	5,840	23	8	4	22	Steady
9	Tim Pütz (GER)	5,790	19	24	9	24	▲15
10	Andrea Vavassori (ITA)	5,785	22	44	6	45	▲34
11	Simone Bolelli (ITA)	5,740	19	55	9	56	▲44
12	Max Purcell (AUS)	5,730	21	35	8	35	▲23
13	Matthew Ebden (AUS)	5,210	20	4	1	13	▼9
14	Henry Patten (GBR)	5,165	31	69	12	73	▲55
15	Rohan Bopanna (IND)	5,150	20	3	1	15	▼12
16	Harri Heliövaara (FIN)	5,145	28	29	11	43	▲13
17	Michael Venus (NZL)	3,775	28	16	11	28	▼1
18	Neal Skupski (GBR)	3,670	27	9	8	27	▼9
19	Nathaniel Lammons (USA)	3,320	34	27	19	29	▲8
=	Jackson Withrow (USA)	3,320	34	22	16	28	▲3

==== No. 1 ranking ====
Holder	Date gained	Date forfeited
Austin Krajicek (USA)	Year end 2023	28 January 2024
Rohan Bopanna (IND)	29 January 2024	25 February 2024
Matthew Ebden (AUS)	26 February 2024	3 March 2024
Rohan Bopanna (IND)	4 March 2024	17 March 2024
Austin Krajicek (USA)	18 March 2024	31 March 2024
Rohan Bopanna (IND)	1 April 2024	14 April 2024
Matthew Ebden (AUS)	15 April 2024	5 May 2024
Marcel Granollers (ESP); Horacio Zeballos (ARG)	6 May 2024	9 June 2024
Matthew Ebden (AUS)	10 June 2024	14 July 2024
Marcel Granollers (ESP); Horacio Zeballos (ARG)	15 July 2024	10 November 2024
Marcelo Arévalo (ESA); Mate Pavić (CRO)	11 November 2024	Year end 2024

== Point distribution ==
Points are awarded as follows:

Category	W	F	SF	QF	R16	R32	R64	R128	Q	Q3	Q2	Q1
Grand Slam (128S)	2000	1300	800	400	200	100	50	10	30	16	8	0
Grand Slam (64D)	2000	1200	720	360	180	90	0	–	25	–	0	0
ATP Finals (8S/8D)	1500 (max); 1100 (min)	1000 (max); 600 (min)	600 (max); 200 (min)	200 for each round robin match win, +400 for a semifinal win, +500 for the final win.								
ATP Masters 1000 (96S)	1000	650	400	200	100	50	30	10	20	–	10	0
ATP Masters 1000 (56S)	1000	650	400	200	100	50	10	–	30	–	16	0
ATP Masters 1000 (32/28D)	1000	600	360	180	90	0	–	–	–	–	–	–
ATP 500 (48S)	500	330	200	100	50	25	0	–	16	–	8	0
ATP 500 (32S)	500	330	200	100	50	0	–	–	25	–	13	0
ATP 500 (16D)	500	300	180	90	0	–	–	–	45	–	25	0
ATP 250 (48S)	250	165	100	50	25	13	0	–	8	–	4	0
ATP 250 (32S/28S)	250	165	100	50	25	0	–	–	13	–	7	0
ATP 250 (16D)	250	150	90	45	0	–	–	–	–	–	–	–
United Cup	500 (max)	For details, see 2024 United Cup										

== Prize money leaders ==
Prize money in US$ as of 18 November 2024
No.	Player	Singles	Doubles	Year-to-date
1	(Italy) Jannik Sinner	$16,914,035	$32,114	$16,946,149
2	(Spain) Carlos Alcaraz	$9,850,338	$0	$9,850,338
3	(Germany) Alexander Zverev	$8,839,406	$155,697	$8,995,103
4	(United States) Taylor Fritz	$6,915,586	$90,609	$7,006,195
5	Daniil Medvedev	$5,573,010	$42,746	$5,615,756
6	(Norway) Casper Ruud	$5,010,351	$54,956	$5,065,307
7	(Serbia) Novak Djokovic	$4,421,915	$0	$4,421,915
8	Andrey Rublev	$4,067,753	$63,063	$4,130,816
9	(Australia) Alex de Minaur	$4,041,718	$38,328	$4,080,046
10	(Greece) Stefanos Tsitsipas	$3,392,603	$135,821	$3,528,424

== Best matches by ATPTour.com ==
=== Best 5 Grand Slam tournament matches ===
	Event	Round	Surface	Winner	Opponent	Result
1.	French Open	R3	Clay	(Serbia) Novak Djokovic	(Italy) Lorenzo Musetti	7–5, 6–7^{(6–8)}, 2–6, 6–3, 6–0
2.	Australian Open	F	Hard	(Italy) Jannik Sinner	Daniil Medvedev	3–6, 3–6, 6–4, 6–4, 6–3
3.	French Open	SF	Clay	(Spain) Carlos Alcaraz	(Italy) Jannik Sinner	2–6, 6–3, 3–6, 6–4, 6–3
4.	Wimbledon	R3	Grass	(Spain) Carlos Alcaraz	(United States) Frances Tiafoe	5–7, 6–2, 4–6, 7–6^{(7–2)}, 6–2
5.	US Open	R3	Hard	(United States) Frances Tiafoe	(United States) Ben Shelton	4–6, 7–5, 6–7^{(5–7)}, 6–4, 6–3

=== Best 5 ATP Tour matches ===
	Event	Round	Surface	Winner	Opponent	Result
1.	China Open	F	Hard	(Spain) Carlos Alcaraz	(Italy) Jannik Sinner	6–7^{(6–8)}, 6–4, 7–6^{(7–3)}
2.	Cincinnati Open	SF	Hard	(Italy) Jannik Sinner	(Germany) Alexander Zverev	7–6^{(11–9)}, 5–7, 7–6^{(7–4)}
3.	Monte-Carlo Masters	SF	Clay	(Greece) Stefanos Tsitsipas	(Italy) Jannik Sinner	6–4, 3–6, 6–4
4.	Hamburg Open	F	Clay	(France) Arthur Fils	(Germany) Alexander Zverev	6–3, 3–6, 7–6^{(7–1)}
5.	United Cup	F	Hard	(Germany) Alexander Zverev	(Poland) Hubert Hurkacz	6–7^{(3–7)}, 7–6^{(8–6)}, 6–4

== Retirements ==
The following is a list of notable players (winners of a main tour title, and/or part of the ATP rankings top 100 in singles, or top 100 in doubles, for at least one week) who announced their retirement from professional tennis, became inactive (after not playing for more than 52 weeks), or were permanently banned from playing, during the 2024 season:

- (Hungary) Attila Balázs joined the professional tour in 2006 and reached a career-high ranking of No. 76 in singles in March 2020. Balázs announced his retirement in February 2024.
- (United States) William Blumberg joined the professional tour in 2021 and reached career-high rankings of No. 74 in doubles in September 2022. He won three doubles titles. Blumberg announced he had retired in this season.
- (Jamaica) Dustin Brown joined the professional tour in 2002 and reached a career-high ranking of No. 64 in singles in October 2016 and No. 43 in doubles in May 2012. He won two doubles titles. Brown announced in January 2024 that he would retire at the end of the season and expressed the possibility of playing several events.
- (Serbia) Nikola Ćaćić joined the professional tour in 2007 and reached a career-high ranking of No. 35 in doubles in November 2021. He won three doubles titles. Ćaćić announced his retirement in December 2024.
- (Uruguay) Pablo Cuevas joined the professional tour in 2004 and reached a career-high ranking of No. 19 in singles in August 2016 and No. 14 in doubles in April 2009. Cuevas announced his retirement in September 2024, having made his final appearance at the 2024 US Open.
- (Netherlands) Thiemo de Bakker joined the professional tour in 2006 and reached a career-high ranking of No. 40 in singles in July 2010. De Bakker announced his retirement in November 2024.
- Federico Delbonis joined the professional tour in 2007 and reached a career-high ranking of No. 33 in singles in May 2016. He won two singles and two doubles titles. Delbonis announced his retirement in January 2024 and made a final professional appearance at the Argentina Open in doubles partnering Facundo Bagnis.
- Evgeny Donskoy joined the professional tour in 2007 and reached a career-high ranking of No. 65 in singles in July 2013. Donskoy retired from professional tennis after the end of the season.
- (Italy) Alessandro Giannessi joined the professional tour in 2008 and reached a career-high ranking of No. 84 in singles in July 2017. Giannessi announced his retirement in August 2024.
- (Kazakhstan) Andrey Golubev joined the professional tour in 2005 and reached a career-high ranking of No. 33 in singles in October 2010 and No. 21 in doubles in May 2022. He won one singles and one doubles title. Golubev announced his retirement from professional tennis in September 2024.
- (Ecuador) Emilio Gómez joined the professional tour in 2013 and reached a career-high ranking of No. 90 in singles in February 2023. Gómez retired from professional tennis in July 2024.
- (India) Prajnesh Gunneswaran joined the professional tour in 2010 and reached a career-high ranking of No. 75 in singles in April 2019. Gunneswaran announced his retirement from professional tennis in November 2024 after struggling with wrist problems.
- (United States) Ryan Harrison joined the professional tour in 2007 and reached a career-high ranking of No. 40 in singles in July 2017 and No. 16 in doubles in November 2017. He won one singles title and four doubles titles, including a Grand Slam doubles title at the 2017 French Open partnering Michael Venus. Harrison announced his retirement in January 2024.
- (Japan) Tatsuma Ito joined the professional tour in 2006 and reached a career-high ranking of No. 60 in singles in October 2012. Ito announced in April 2024 that he would retire at the end of the season.
- (Czech Republic) Roman Jebavý joined the professional tour in 2009 and reached a career-high ranking of No. 43 in doubles in March 2019. He won four doubles titles. Jebavý announced his retirement in August 2024, and made his last professional appearance at the 2024 Svijany Open, partnering Jiří Veselý.
- (United States) Steve Johnson joined the professional tour in 2012 and reached a career-high ranking of No. 21 in singles in July 2016 and No. 39 in doubles in May 2016. He won four singles titles and two doubles titles, as well as a bronze medal at the 2016 Summer Olympics partnering Jack Sock. Johnson announced his retirement in March 2024 and made a final professional appearance at the 2024 BNP Paribas Open.
- (Croatia) Ivo Karlović joined the professional tour in 2000 and reached a career-high ranking of No. 14 in singles in August 2008 and No. 44 in doubles in April 2006. He won eight singles and two doubles titles. Karlović announced his retirement in February 2024 following two and a half years of inactivity.
- (Netherlands) Wesley Koolhof joined the professional tour in 2008 and reached a career-high ranking of No. 1 in doubles in November 2022. He won twenty-one doubles titles, including a Grand Slam title at the 2023 Wimbledon Championships partnering Neal Skupski. Koolhof announced in November 2023 that he would retire at the end of the season.
- (Serbia) Filip Krajinović joined the professional tour in 2008 and reached a career-high ranking of No. 26 in singles in April 2018. Krajinović announced his retirement in August 2024, with his final appearance being at the 2024 US Open.
- (Switzerland) Henri Laaksonen joined the professional tour in 2009 and reached a career-high ranking of No. 84 in singles in February 2022. Laaksonen retired from professional tennis at the end of the season.
- (Japan) Ben McLachlan joined the professional tour in 2014 and reached a career-high ranking of No. 18 in doubles in November 2018. He won seven doubles titles. McLachlan announced his retirement in April 2024.
- (Austria) Gerald Melzer joined the professional tour in 2007 and reached a career-high ranking of No. 68 in singles in November 2016. Melzer retired from professional tennis in September 2024.
- (Australia) John Millman joined the professional tour in 2006 and reached a career-high ranking of No. 33 in singles in October 2018. He won one singles title. Millman announced his retirement in November 2023 and made a final professional appearance at the 2024 Australian Open.

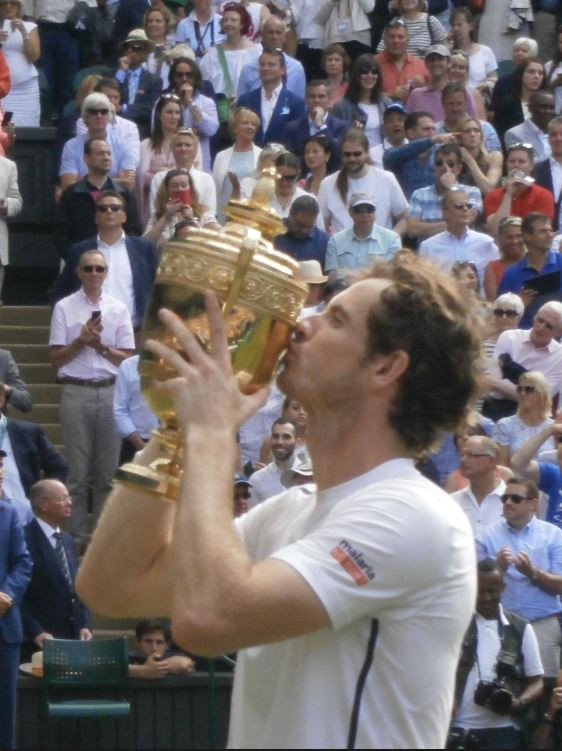
Former world no. 1 Andy Murray (pictured in 2016), a 3-time major champion, announced his retirement in the 2024 Summer Olympics.

- (United Kingdom) Andy Murray joined the professional tour in 2005 and reached a career-high ranking of No. 1 in singles in November 2016 and No. 51 in doubles in October 2011. Murray won forty-six singles titles (including three Grand Slam titles) and three doubles titles. He was also the winner of the 2016 ATP World Tour Finals and won two Olympic gold medals in singles. Murray announced his retirement in July 2024 following the 2024 Paris Olympics.

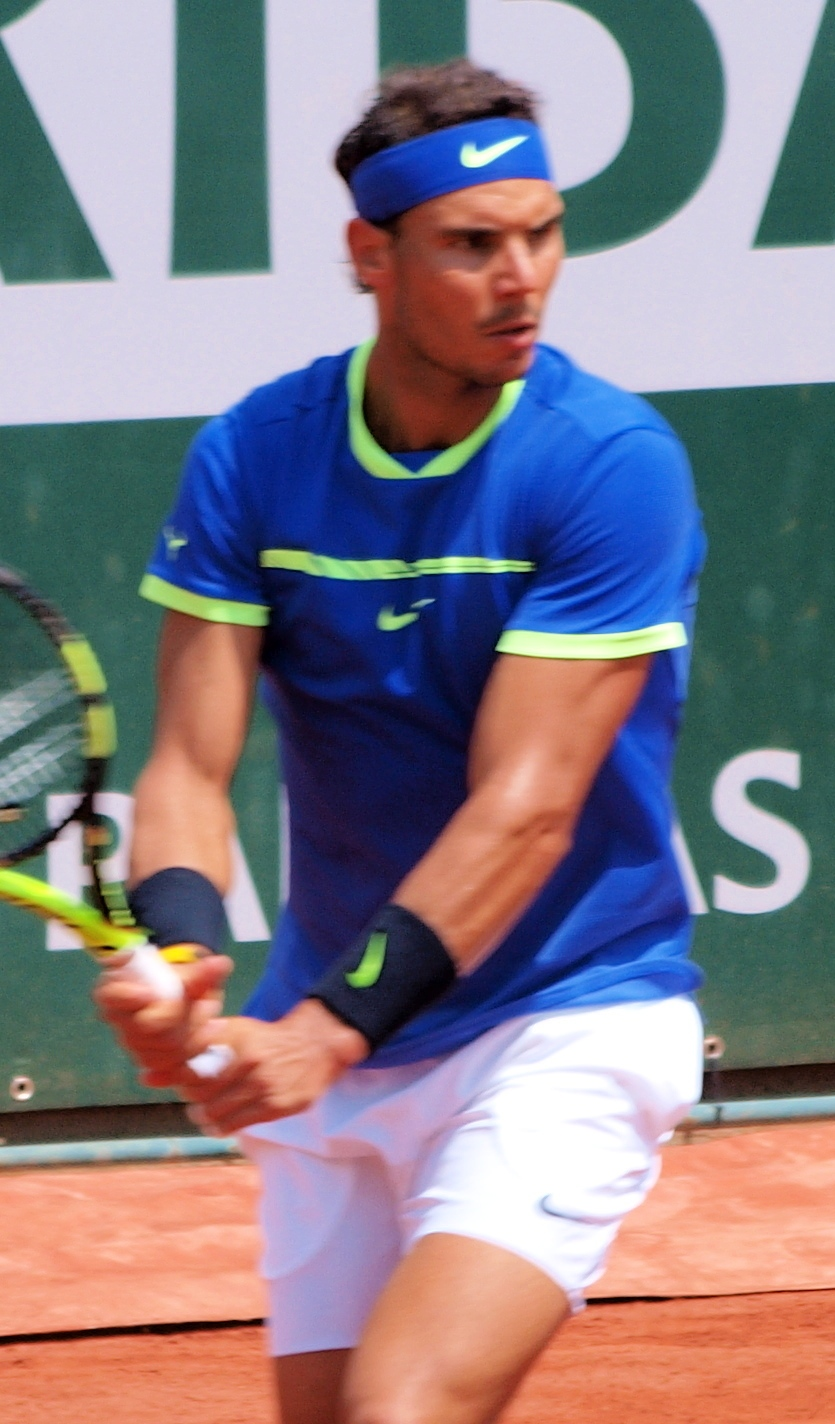
Former world no. 1 Rafael Nadal (pictured in 2017), a 22-time major champion, announced his retirement in the 2024 Davis Cup Finals.

- (Spain) Rafael Nadal joined the professional tour in 2001 and reached a career-high ranking of No. 1 in singles in August 2008. Nadal also reached a career-high ranking of No. 26 in doubles in August 2005. Nadal won ninety-two career titles, including twenty-two Grand Slams. Nadal announced his retirement in October 2024 with his last match being in the finals of the Davis Cup in November.
- (United Kingdom) Jonny O'Mara joined the professional tour in 2011 and reached career-high rankings of No. 44 in doubles in May 2019. He won three doubles titles. O'Mara announced he had retired this year following one year of inactivity.
- (Austria) Philipp Oswald joined the professional tour in 2005, reached a career-high ranking of No. 31 in doubles in June 2021. He won eleven doubles titles. Oswald retired in July 2024 and made a final professional appearance at the Generali Open Kitzbühel, partnering Joel Schwärzler.
- (United States) Hunter Reese joined the professional tour in 2015 and reached a career-high ranking of No. 73 in doubles in June 2022. Reese retired at the end of this season.
- (Slovenia) Blaž Rola joined the professional tour in 2013 and reached a career-high ranking of No. 78 in singles in January 2015. He won one doubles title. Rola retired in this season.
- (Czech Republic) Lukáš Rosol joined the professional tour in 2004 and reached a career-high ranking of No. 26 in singles in September 2014 and No. 37 in doubles in October 2014. He won two singles and three doubles titles. Rosol announced his retirement in April 2024.
- (New Zealand) Artem Sitak joined the professional tour in 2001 and reached a career-high ranking of No. 32 in doubles in September 2018. He won five doubles titles. Sitak announced his retirement in January 2024 and made a final professional appearance at the 2024 ASB Classic.
- (Portugal) João Sousa joined the professional tour in 2008 and reached a career-high ranking of No. 28 in singles in May 2016 and No. 26 in doubles in May 2019. He won four singles titles. Sousa announced his retirement in February 2024 and made a final professional appearance at the 2024 Estoril Open.
- (Austria) Dominic Thiem joined the professional tour in 2011 and reached a career-high ranking of No. 3 in singles in March 2020 and No. 67 in doubles in October 2019. He won seventeen singles titles, including a major title at the 2020 US Open and a Masters 1000 title at the 2019 Indian Wells. He was also runner up in three majors and two consecutive ATP Finals. Thiem announced his retirement in May 2024 after being unable to recover from a long-term wrist injury originally sustained in 2021. He made his final appearance at the Vienna Open.
- (United States) Donald Young ended his career at the US Open, playing his last match partnered Taylor Townsend in the mixed doubles final.
- (Slovakia) Igor Zelenay joined the professional tour in 2002 and reached a career-high ranking of No. 50 in doubles in July 2009. He won one doubles title. Zelenay announced his retirement in December 2024.

=== Inactivity ===
- (South Africa) Kevin Anderson became inactive having not played for more than a year.
- (Bosnia and Herzegovina) Tomislav Brkić became inactive having not played for more than a year.
- Mikhail Elgin became inactive having not played for more than a year.
- (Latvia) Ernests Gulbis became inactive having not played for more than a year.
- (Australia) Bradley Mousley became inactive having not played for more than a year.
- (Netherlands) Igor Sijsling became inactive having not played for more than a year.
- (Croatia) Franko Škugor became inactive having not played for more than a year.
- (Germany) Cedrik-Marcel Stebe became inactive having not played for more than a year.
- (Spain) Fernando Verdasco became inactive having not played for more than a year.

== Comebacks and appearances ==
- (South Korea) Chung Hyeon returned to the ITF Men's World Tennis Tour in September 2024.
- (Poland) Kamil Majchrzak returned to the ITF Men's World Tennis Tour following the expiration of his doping suspension in January 2024.
- (Slovakia) Andrej Martin returned to the ITF Men's World Tennis Tour after his doping suspension expired in June 2024.
- (Brazil) Fabrício Neis returned for one tournament at the 2024 Brasil Tennis Open, partnering Guilherme Clezar in the doubles event.
- (Netherlands) Tim van Rijthoven returned to the ATP Tour after he received a wildcard for the Rosmalen Grass Court Championships. Van Rijthoven had not played a match since February 2023. He also participated in the Wimbledon Championships qualifying competition.

== See also ==
- 2024 WTA Tour
- 2024 ATP Challenger Tour
- 2024 ITF Men's World Tennis Tour
