= 2024 Chengdu Open =

- Date: 18–24 September
- Edition: 6th
- Category: ATP Tour 250 series
- Draw: 28S / 16D
- Surface: Hard / outdoor
- Location: Chengdu, China

Champions

Singles
- (China) Shang Juncheng

Doubles
- (France) Sadio Doumbia / (France) Fabien Reboul
← 2023 ·	Chengdu Open	· 2025 →

The 2024 Chengdu Open was a men's tennis tournament played on outdoor hard courts. It was the sixth edition of the Chengdu Open and part of the ATP Tour 250 series of the 2024 ATP Tour. It took place at the Sichuan International Tennis Center in Chengdu, China, from 18 to 24 September 2024.

== Champions ==
=== Singles ===
- (China) Shang Juncheng def. (Italy) Lorenzo Musetti 7–6^{(7–4)}, 6–1

=== Doubles ===
- (France) Sadio Doumbia / (France) Fabien Reboul def. (India) Yuki Bhambri / (France) Albano Olivetti, 6–4, 4–6, [10–4]

== Singles main-draw entrants ==
=== Seeds ===
Country	Player	Rank^{1}	Seed
ITA	Lorenzo Musetti	19	1
KAZ	Alexander Bublik	27	2
CHI	Nicolás Jarry	28	3
ESP	Pedro Martínez	42	4
FRA	Adrian Mannarino	46	5
ITA	Lorenzo Sonego	50	6
FRA	Giovanni Mpetshi Perricard	51	7
	Roman Safiullin	56	8

- ^{1} Rankings are as of 16 September 2024

=== Other entrants ===
The following players received wildcards into the singles main draw:

- (Japan) Kei Nishikori
- (China) Sun Fajing
- (China) Zhou Yi

The following players received entry from the qualifying draw:

- (France) Térence Atmane
- (Argentina) Federico Agustín Gómez
- Alibek Kachmazov
- (Japan) Shintaro Mochizuki

=== Withdrawals ===
- (Portugal) Nuno Borges → replaced by (Australia) Christopher O'Connell
- (Australia) James Duckworth → replaced by (Slovakia) Lukáš Klein
- (United States) Marcos Giron → replaced by (Australia) Adam Walton
- (Poland) Hubert Hurkacz → replaced by (Croatia) Borna Ćorić
- (Serbia) Miomir Kecmanović → replaced by (Japan) Taro Daniel
- (Czech Republic) Jakub Menšík → replaced by (China) Shang Juncheng
- (France) Gaël Monfils → replaced by (Chinese Taipei) Tseng Chun-hsin
- (Australia) Jordan Thompson → replaced by (Germany) Yannick Hanfmann

== Doubles main-draw entrants ==
=== Seeds ===
Country	Player	Country	Player	Rank^{1}	Seed
FRA	Sadio Doumbia	FRA	Fabien Reboul	59	1
CRO	Ivan Dodig	BRA	Rafael Matos	60	2
IND	Yuki Bhambri	FRA	Albano Olivetti	87	3
MEX	Miguel Ángel Reyes-Varela	AUS	John-Patrick Smith	122	4

- ^{1} Rankings are as of 16 September 2024

=== Other entrants ===
The following pairs received wildcards into the doubles main draw:

- (China) Mo Yecong / (China) Tang Sheng
- (China) Wang Aoran / (China) Zhou Yi

The following pairs received entry as alternates:

- Pavel Kotov / (France) Giovanni Mpetshi Perricard
- (Japan) Toshihide Matsui / (Australia) Adam Walton

=== Withdrawals ===
- (Croatia) Ivan Dodig / (Czech Republic) Adam Pavlásek → replaced by (Croatia) Ivan Dodig / (Brazil) Rafael Matos
- (Australia) James Duckworth / Roman Safiullin → replaced by (Zimbabwe) Benjamin Lock / (Zimbabwe) Courtney John Lock
- (United States) Austin Krajicek / (Netherlands) Jean-Julien Rojer → replaced by (China) Cui Jie / (China) Sun Fajing
- (Brazil) Rafael Matos / (Brazil) Marcelo Melo → replaced by (Japan) Toshihide Matsui / (Australia) Adam Walton
- (Australia) Christopher O'Connell / (Australia) Jordan Thompson → replaced by Pavel Kotov / (France) Giovanni Mpetshi Perricard
