= 2024 Chengdu Open – Doubles =

Doubles
- 2024 Chengdu Open

Final
- Champions: (France) Sadio Doumbia (France) Fabien Reboul
- Runners-up: (India) Yuki Bhambri (France) Albano Olivetti
- Score: 6–4, 4–6, [10–4]

Details
- Draw: 16 (2WC)
- Seeds: 4

Events
Singles	Doubles
- Chengdu Open

Defending champions Sadio Doumbia and Fabien Reboul defeated Yuki Bhambri and Albano Olivetti in the final, 6–4, 4–6, [10–4] to win the doubles tennis title at the 2024 Chengdu Open.

== Seeds ==
1. (France) Sadio Doumbia / (France) Fabien Reboul (champions)
2. (Croatia) Ivan Dodig / (Brazil) Rafael Matos (semifinals)
3. (India) Yuki Bhambri / (France) Albano Olivetti (final)
4. (Mexico) Miguel Ángel Reyes-Varela / (Australia) John-Patrick Smith (semifinals)

== Draw ==
Key

- Q = Qualifier
- WC = Wild card
- LL = Lucky loser
- Alt = Alternate
- ITF = ITF entry
- PR = Protected ranking
- SR = Special ranking
- SE = Special exempt
- JE = Junior exempt
- JR = Junior Accelerator Programme entrant
- CO = College Accelerator Programme entrant
- NG = Next Gen Accelerator Program entrant
- w/o = Walkover
- r = Retired
- d = Defaulted

=== Draw ===
First round
1	(France) S Doumbia (France) F Reboul	6	6
(France) A Mannarino (France) A Müller	2	3
(China) J Cui (China) F Sun	5	3
(United States) E King (United States) R Stalder	7	6
4	(Mexico) MÁ Reyes-Varela (Australia) J-P Smith	6	6
WC	(China) A Wang (China) Y Zhou	3	4
(Netherlands) D Pel (Netherlands) B Stevens	7^{10}	7^{7}
(Spain) P Martínez (Italy) L Sonego	6^{8}	6^{0}
(Colombia) C Rodríguez (Australia) MC Romios	5	4
(Ecuador) G Escobar (Ecuador) D Hidalgo	7	6
Alt	(Japan) T Matsui (Australia) A Walton	3	3
3	(India) Y Bhambri (France) A Olivetti	6	6
(Zimbabwe) B Lock (Zimbabwe) CJ Lock	3	6^{8}
WC	(China) Y Mo (China) S Tang	6	7^{10}
Alt	P Kotov (France) G Mpetshi Perricard	3	4
2	(Croatia) I Dodig (Brazil) R Matos	6	6

Quarterfinals
1	(France) S Doumbia (France) F Reboul	5	6	[10]
(United States) E King (United States) R Stalder	7	2	[6]
4	(Mexico) MÁ Reyes-Varela (Australia) J-P Smith	6	3	[11]
(Netherlands) D Pel (Netherlands) B Stevens	4	6	[9]
(Ecuador) G Escobar (Ecuador) D Hidalgo	7	3	[10]
3	(India) Y Bhambri (France) A Olivetti	5	6	[12]
WC	(China) Y Mo (China) S Tang	1	1
2	(Croatia) I Dodig (Brazil) R Matos	6	6

Semifinals
1	(France) S Doumbia (France) F Reboul	4	6	[12]
4	(Mexico) MÁ Reyes-Varela (Australia) J-P Smith	6	3	[10]
3	(India) Y Bhambri (France) A Olivetti	6	7^{11}
2	(Croatia) I Dodig (Brazil) R Matos	3	6^{9}

Final
1	(France) S Doumbia (France) F Reboul	6	4	[10]
3	(India) Y Bhambri (France) A Olivetti	4	6	[4]
