= 2024 Chengdu Open – Singles =

Singles
- 2024 Chengdu Open

Final
- Champion: (China) Shang Juncheng
- Runner-up: (Italy) Lorenzo Musetti
- Score: 7–6^{(7–4)}, 6–1

Details
- Draw: 28 (4 Q / 3 WC )
- Seeds: 8

Events
| Singles | Doubles |
| ← 2023 · | Chengdu Open | · 2025 → |

Shang Juncheng defeated Lorenzo Musetti in the final, 7–6^{(7–4)}, 6–1 to win the singles title at the 2024 Chengdu Open. Shang dropped just one set en route to his first ATP Tour singles title (against Roman Safiullin in the second round), and became the second Chinese man to win a tour-level singles title in the Open Era, after Wu Yibing at the 2023 Dallas Open. Shang was also the first player born in 2005 to win a singles title, making him the youngest winner on the Tour for the season.

Alexander Zverev was the reigning champion, but chose to compete at the Laver Cup in Berlin instead.

== Seeds ==
The top four seeds received a bye into the second round.

1. (Italy) Lorenzo Musetti (final)
2. (Kazakhstan) Alexander Bublik (quarterfinals)
3. (Chile) Nicolás Jarry (quarterfinals)
4. (Spain) Pedro Martínez (quarterfinals)
5. (France) Adrian Mannarino (quarterfinals)
6. (Italy) Lorenzo Sonego (first round)
7. (France) Giovanni Mpetshi Perricard (second round)
8. Roman Safiullin (second round)

== Draw ==
=== Key ===
- Q = Qualifier
- WC = Wild card
- LL = Lucky loser
- Alt = Alternate
- ITF = ITF entry
- PR = Protected ranking
- SR = Special ranking
- SE = Special exempt
- JE = Junior exempt
- JR = Junior Accelerator Programme entrant
- CO = College Accelerator Programme entrant
- NG = Next Gen Accelerator Program entrant
- w/o = Walkover
- r = Retired
- d = Defaulted

=== Finals ===
Semifinals
1 | (Italy) Lorenzo Musetti | 6 | 6
Q | Alibek Kachmazov | 4 | 2
(Germany) Yannick Hanfmann | 4 | 4
(China) Shang Juncheng | 6 | 6

Final
1 | (Italy) Lorenzo Musetti | 6^{4} | 1
(China) Shang Juncheng | 7^{7} | 6

=== Top half ===
First round
P Kotov | 4 | 5
(Australia) C O'Connell | 6 | 7
WC | (China) Y Zhou | 2 | 6 | 3
(Chinese Taipei) C-h Tseng | 6 | 1 | 1^{r}
Q | (France) T Atmane | 7^{11} | 1 | 3
5 | (France) A Mannarino | 6^{9} | 6 | 6
(Australia) A Walton | 6^{3} | 4
(Slovakia) L Klein | 7^{7} | 6
Q | A Kachmazov | 6 | 7^{9}
(United States) A Kovacevic | 4 | 6^{7}
(Japan) T Daniel | 6 | 7
6 | (Italy) L Sonego | 4 | 5

Second round
1 | (Italy) L Musetti | 6^{5} | 6 | 7^{7}
(Australia) C O'Connell | 7^{7} | 4 | 6^{4}
WC | (China) Y Zhou | 6^{3} | 6 | 4
5 | (France) A Mannarino | 7^{7} | 2 | 6
3 | (Chile) N Jarry | 7^{7} | 3 | 6
(Slovakia) L Klein | 6^{2} | 6 | 4
Q | A Kachmazov | 7^{7} | 6
(Japan) T Daniel | 6^{1} | 1

Quarterfinals
1 | (Italy) L Musetti | 6 | 5 | 6
5 | (France) A Mannarino | 2 | 7 | 2
3 | (Chile) N Jarry | 3 | 4
Q | A Kachmazov | 6 | 6

Semifinals
1 | (Italy) L Musetti | 6 | 6
Q | A Kachmazov | 4 | 2

=== Bottom half ===
First round
7 | (France) G Mpetshi Perricard | 6^{5} | 7 | 6
WC | (China) F Sun | 7^{7} | 5 | 4
(Germany) Y Hanfmann | 6 | 7^{7}
Q | (Japan) S Mochizuki | 4 | 6^{4}
(Australia) A Vukic | 3 | 7^{11} | 6
(Croatia) B Ćorić | 6 | 6^{9} | 4
8 | R Safiullin | 6 | 4 | 6
(Italy) F Fognini | 3 | 6 | 4
(China) J Shang | 6 | 6
WC | (Japan) K Nishikori | 4 | 4
(France) A Müller | 4 | 5
Q | (Argentina) FA Gómez | 6 | 7

Second round
7 | (France) G Mpetshi Perricard | 4 | 6 | 3
(Germany) Y Hanfmann | 6 | 3 | 6
(Australia) A Vukic | 3 | 4
4 | (Spain) P Martínez | 6 | 6
8 | R Safiullin | 7 | 3 | 3
(China) J Shang | 5 | 6 | 6
Q | (Argentina) FA Gómez | 4 | 4
2 | (Kazakhstan) A Bublik | 6 | 6

Quarterfinals
(Germany) Y Hanfmann | 7^{7} | 6
4 | (Spain) P Martínez | 6^{1} | 2
(China) J Shang | 6 | 7^{10}
2 | (Kazakhstan) A Bublik | 4 | 6^{8}

Semifinals
(Germany) Y Hanfmann | 4 | 4
(China) J Shang | 6 | 6

== Qualifying ==
=== Seeds ===
1. (South Korea) Hong Seong-chan (first round)
2. (Japan) Shintaro Mochizuki (qualified)
3. (Spain) Alejandro Moro Cañas (first round)
4. (France) Térence Atmane (qualified)
5. (Japan) Sho Shimabukuro (first round)
6. (Argentina) Federico Agustín Gómez (qualified)
7. (Chinese Taipei) Hsu Yu-hsiou (first round)
8. (Australia) Li Tu (qualifying competition)

=== Qualifiers ===
1. Alibek Kachmazov
2. (Japan) Shintaro Mochizuki
3. (Argentina) Federico Agustín Gómez
4. (France) Térence Atmane

=== Qualifying draw ===
==== First qualifier ====
First round
1 | (South Korea) Hong Seong-chan | 4 | 1
Alibek Kachmazov | 6 | 6
WC | (China) Cui Jie | 6 | 6
7 | (Chinese Taipei) Hsu Yu-hsiou | 4 | 2

Qualifying competition
Alibek Kachmazov | 6 | 6
WC | (China) Cui Jie | 3 | 2

==== Second qualifier ====
First round
2 | (Japan) Shintaro Mochizuki | 3 | 6 | 6
WC | (China) Charles Chen | 6 | 3 | 2
Egor Gerasimov | 4 | 1
8 | (Australia) Li Tu | 6 | 6

Qualifying competition
2 | (Japan) Shintaro Mochizuki | 7^{7} | 1 | 7^{7}
8 | (Australia) Li Tu | 6^{3} | 6 | 6^{1}

==== Third qualifier ====
First round
3 | (Spain) Alejandro Moro Cañas | 6^{5} | 4
(Kazakhstan) Beibit Zhukayev | 7^{7} | 6
(Ukraine) Vadym Ursu | 3 | 3
6 | (Argentina) Federico Agustín Gómez | 6 | 6

Qualifying competition
(Kazakhstan) Beibit Zhukayev | 4 | 4
6 | (Argentina) Federico Agustín Gómez | 6 | 6

==== Fourth qualifier ====
First round
4 | (France) Térence Atmane | 6 | 6^{4} | 6
(Australia) Marc Polmans | 4 | 7^{7} | 4
(China) Bai Yan | 1 | 6 | 6
5 | (Japan) Sho Shimabukuro | 6 | 2 | 4

Qualifying competition
4 | (France) Térence Atmane | 6 | 6
(China) Bai Yan | 3 | 2
