= 2024 Abierto Mexicano Telcel – Doubles =

Doubles
- 2024 Abierto Mexicano Telcel

Final
- Champion: (Monaco) Hugo Nys (Poland) Jan Zieliński
- Runner-up: (Mexico) Santiago González (United Kingdom) Neal Skupski
- Score: 6–3, 6–2

Events
Singles	Doubles
- Mexican Open

Hugo Nys and Jan Zieliński defeated Santiago González and Neal Skupski in the final, 6–3, 6–2 to win the doubles tennis title at the 2024 Mexican Open.

Alexander Erler and Lucas Miedler were the defending champions, but lost in the quarterfinals to Nys and Zieliński.

== Seeds ==
1. (Mexico) Santiago González / (United Kingdom) Neal Skupski (final)
2. (Monaco) Hugo Nys / (Poland) Jan Zieliński (champions)
3. (Australia) Rinky Hijikata / (United Kingdom) Joe Salisbury (withdrew)
4. (France) Sadio Doumbia / (France) Fabien Reboul (semifinals)

== Draw ==
Key

- Q = Qualifier
- WC = Wild card
- LL = Lucky loser
- Alt = Alternate
- ITF = ITF entry
- PR = Protected ranking
- SR = Special ranking
- SE = Special exempt
- JE = Junior exempt
- JR = Junior Accelerator Programme entrant
- CO = College Accelerator Programme entrant
- NG = Next Gen Accelerator Program entrant
- w/o = Walkover
- r = Retired
- d = Defaulted

=== Draw ===
First round
1	(Mexico) S González (United Kingdom) N Skupski	6	6
(United States) W Blumberg (Norway) C Ruud	3	2
Q	(United Kingdom) D Evans (United Kingdom) H Patten	6^{4}	0
(Monaco) R Arneodo (Austria) S Weissborn	7^{7}	6
4	(France) S Doumbia (France) F Reboul	4	6	[10]
(Serbia) M Kecmanović; R Safiullin	6	4	[6]
LL	(Mexico) E Aguilera (Mexico) M Sánchez	4	4
(Ecuador) G Escobar (Kazakhstan) A Nedovyesov	6	6
WC	(Greece) Pe Tsitsipas (Greece) S Tsitsipas	4	3
(United Kingdom) J Cash (United States) R Galloway	6	6
(Finland) H Heliövaara (Australia) J Peers	6	3	[10]
LL	(Mexico) H Hach Verdugo (Venezuela) LD Martínez	4	6	[7]
(Portugal) N Borges (Portugal) F Cabral	6^{9}	6^{6}
(Austria) A Erler (Austria) L Miedler	7^{11}	7^{8}
WC	(Argentina) G Andreozzi (Mexico) MÁ Reyes-Varela	5	6	[6]
2	(Monaco) H Nys (Poland) J Zieliński	7	2	[10]

Quarterfinals
1	(Mexico) S González (United Kingdom) N Skupski	6	7
(Monaco) R Arneodo (Austria) S Weissborn	3	5
4	(France) S Doumbia (France) F Reboul	6	6
(Ecuador) G Escobar (Kazakhstan) A Nedovyesov	4	1
(United Kingdom) J Cash (United States) R Galloway	6	6^{7}	[5]
(Finland) H Heliövaara (Australia) J Peers	4	7^{9}	[10]
(Austria) A Erler (Austria) L Miedler	3	6	[11]
2	(Monaco) H Nys (Poland) J Zieliński	6	2	[13]

Semifinals
1	(Mexico) S González (United Kingdom) N Skupski	7^{7}	6
4	(France) S Doumbia (France) F Reboul	6^{5}	3
(Finland) H Heliövaara (Australia) J Peers	4	3
2	(Monaco) H Nys (Poland) J Zieliński	6	6

Final
1	(Mexico) S González (United Kingdom) N Skupski	3	2
2	(Monaco) H Nys (Poland) J Zieliński	6	6

== Qualifying ==
=== Seeds ===
1. (United Kingdom) Dan Evans / (United Kingdom) Henry Patten (qualified)
2. (Mexico) Hans Hach Verdugo / (Venezuela) Luis David Martínez (qualifying competition, lucky losers)

=== Qualifiers ===
1. (United Kingdom) Dan Evans / (United Kingdom) Henry Patten

=== Lucky losers ===
1. (Mexico) Hans Hach Verdugo / (Venezuela) Luis David Martínez
2. (Mexico) Emiliano Aguilera / (Mexico) Manuel Sánchez

=== Qualifying draw ===
First round
1	(United Kingdom) Dan Evans (United Kingdom) Henry Patten	6	6
Alt	(Mexico) Emiliano Aguilera (Mexico) Manuel Sánchez	3	1
Alt	(Sweden) André Göransson (France) Constant Lestienne	2	3
2/WC	(Mexico) Hans Hach Verdugo (Venezuela) Luis David Martínez	6	6

Qualifying competition
1	(United Kingdom) Dan Evans (United Kingdom) Henry Patten	6	6^{6}	[10]
2/WC	(Mexico) Hans Hach Verdugo (Venezuela) Luis David Martínez	4	7^{8}	[8]
