= 2024 ATP Finals =

- Date: 10–17 November
- Edition: 55th (singles) / 50th (doubles)
- Category: ATP Finals
- Draw: 8S/8D
- Surface: Hard (indoor)
- Location: Turin, Italy
- Venue: Inalpi Arena

Champions

Singles
- (Italy) Jannik Sinner

Doubles
- (Germany) Kevin Krawietz / (Germany) Tim Pütz
← 2023 ·	ATP Finals	· 2025 →

The 2024 ATP Finals (also known as the 2024 Nitto ATP Finals for Nitto sponsorship) was a men's tennis year-end tournament played on indoor hard courts at the Inalpi Arena in Turin, Italy, from 10 to 17 November 2024. It was the season-ending event for the highest-ranked singles players and doubles teams on the 2024 ATP Tour. This was the 55th edition of the tournament (50th in doubles), and the fourth time Turin hosted the ATP Tour year-end championships.

== Champions ==
=== Singles ===
- (Italy) Jannik Sinner def. (United States) Taylor Fritz, 6–4, 6–4

=== Doubles ===
- (Germany) Kevin Krawietz / (Germany) Tim Pütz def. (El Salvador) Marcelo Arévalo / (Croatia) Mate Pavić, 7–6^{(7–5)}, 7–6^{(8–6)}

== Format ==
The ATP Finals group stage has a round-robin format, with eight players/teams divided into two groups of four and each player/team in a group playing the other three in the group. The eight seeds are determined by the Pepperstone ATP rankings and ATP Doubles Team Rankings on the Monday after the last ATP Tour tournament of the calendar year. All singles matches, including the final, are best of three sets with tie-breaks in each set including the third. All doubles matches are two sets (no ad) and a Match Tie-break.

In deciding placement within a group, the following criteria are used, in order:

1. Most wins.
2. Most matches played (e.g., a 2–1 record beats a 2–0 record).
3. Head-to-head result between tied players/teams.
4. Highest percentage of sets won.
5. Highest percentage of games won.
6. ATP rank after the last ATP Tour tournament of the year.

Criteria 4–6 are used only in the event of a three-way tie; if one of these criteria decided a winner or loser among the three, the remaining two will have been ranked by head-to-head result.

The top two of each group will advance to semifinals, with the winner of each group playing the runner-up of the other group. The winners of the semifinals then will play for the title.

== Prize money, ranking points and trophies ==
The 2024 ATP Finals has a total prize money pool of $15,250,000, an increase of 1.67% compared to 2023 and the same total as the WTA Finals for the first time since 2015. The tournament rewards the following points and prize money, per victory (Doubles' prize money is per team):

Stage	Singles	Doubles	Points
Final win	$2,237,200	$356,800	500
Semi-final win	$1,123,400	$178,500	400
Round-robin match win	$396,500	$96,600	200
Participation fee	3 matches = $331,000; 2 matches = $248,250; 1 match = $165,500	3 matches = $134,200; 2 matches = $100,650; 1 match = $67,100	—
Alternates	$155,000	$51,700	—
Undefeated Champion	$4,881,100	$959,300	1500

- An undefeated champion would earn the maximum 1,500 points, and $4,881,100 in singles or $959,300 in doubles.

Additional prizes include the ATP Finals trophy and the ATP year-end No. 1 trophy, all made by London-based silversmiths Thomas Lyte.

== Qualification ==
=== Singles ===
Eight players compete at the tournament, with two named alternates. Players receive places in the following order of precedence:

1. First, the top 7 players in the ATP Race to Turin after the final week of the ATP Tour on 9 November 2024
2. Second, up to two 2024 Grand Slam tournament winners ranked anywhere 8th–20th, in ranking order
3. Third, the eighth ranked player in the ATP rankings

In the event of this totaling more than 8 players, those lower down in the selection order become the alternates. If further alternates are needed, these players are selected by the ATP.

Provisional rankings are published weekly as the ATP Race to Turin, coinciding with the 52-week rolling ATP rankings on the date of selection. Points are accumulated in Grand Slam, ATP Tour, United Cup, ATP Challenger Tour and ITF Tour tournaments. Players accrue points across 19 tournaments, usually made up of:

- The 4 Grand Slam tournaments
- The 8 mandatory ATP Masters 1000 tournaments
- The best results from any 7 other tournaments that carry ranking points (Monte-Carlo Masters, United Cup, ATP 500, ATP 250, Challenger, ITF)
- Player can replace up to 3 mandatory Masters 1000 results with a better score from ATP 500 or ATP 250

=== Doubles ===
Eight teams compete at the tournament, with one named alternate. The eight competing teams receive places according to the same order of precedence as in singles. The named alternate will be offered first to any unaccepted teams in the selection order, then to the highest ranked unaccepted team, and then to a team selected by the ATP. Points are accumulated in the same competitions as for the singles tournament. However, for Doubles teams there are no commitment tournaments, so teams are ranked according to their 19 highest points scoring results from any tournaments on the ATP Tour.

== Qualified players ==
=== Singles ===
#	Players	Date qualified
1	(Italy) Jannik Sinner	10 August
2	(Germany) Alexander Zverev	1 September
3	(Spain) Carlos Alcaraz	24 September
4	Daniil Medvedev	22 October
5	(United States) Taylor Fritz	29 October
6	(Norway) Casper Ruud	5 November
7	Andrey Rublev	5 November
8	(Australia) Alex de Minaur	5 November

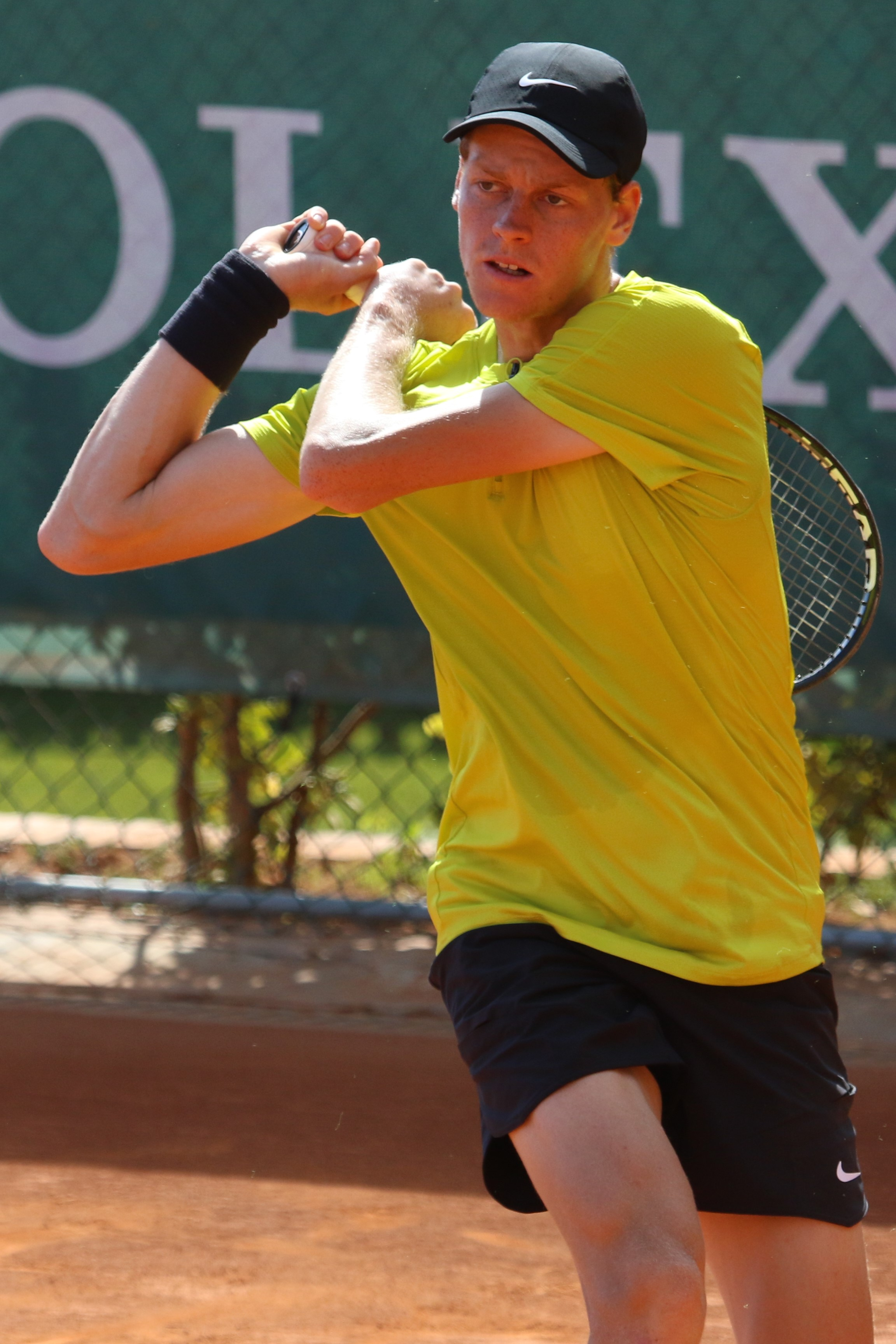
Sinner

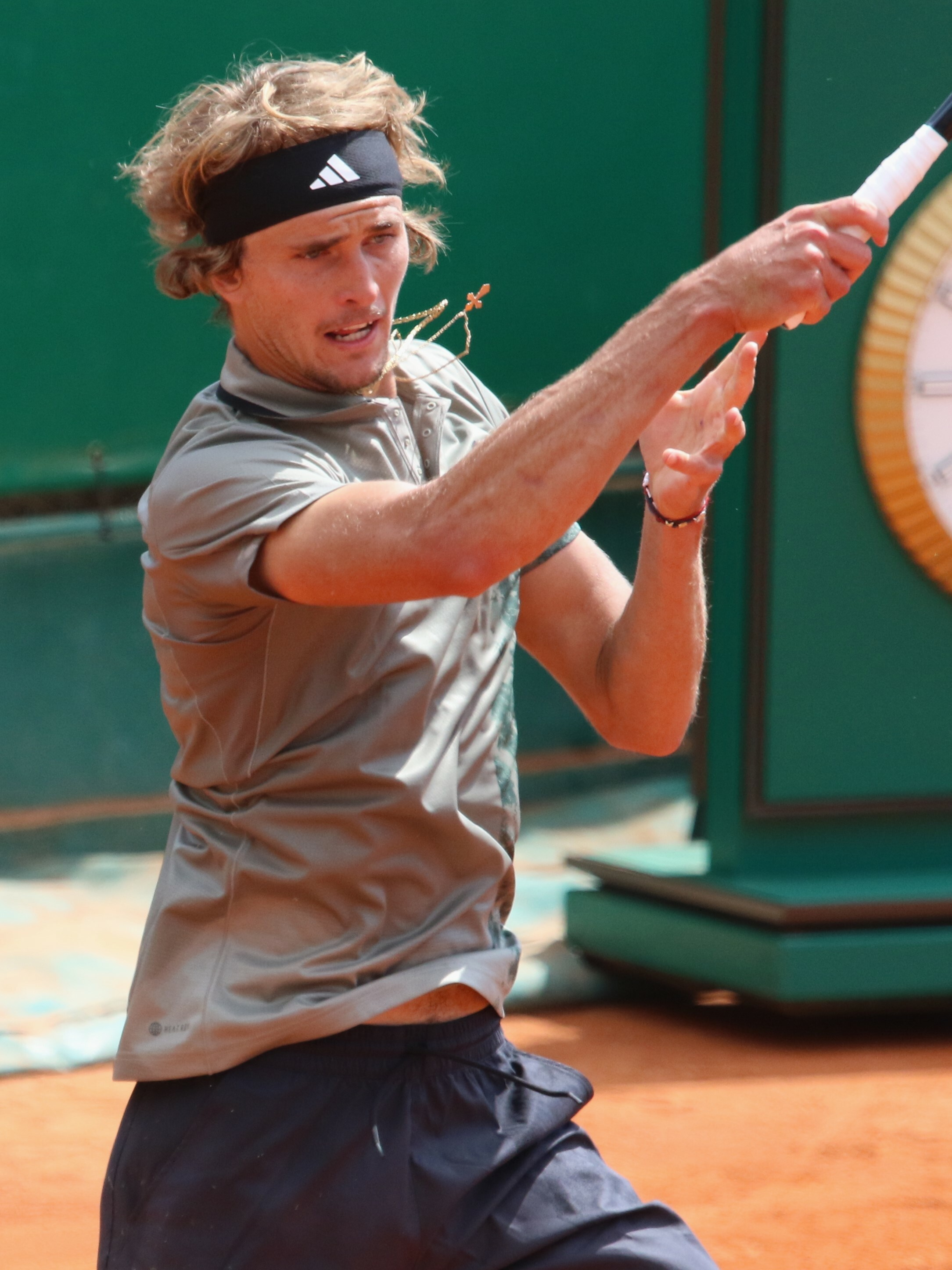
Zverev

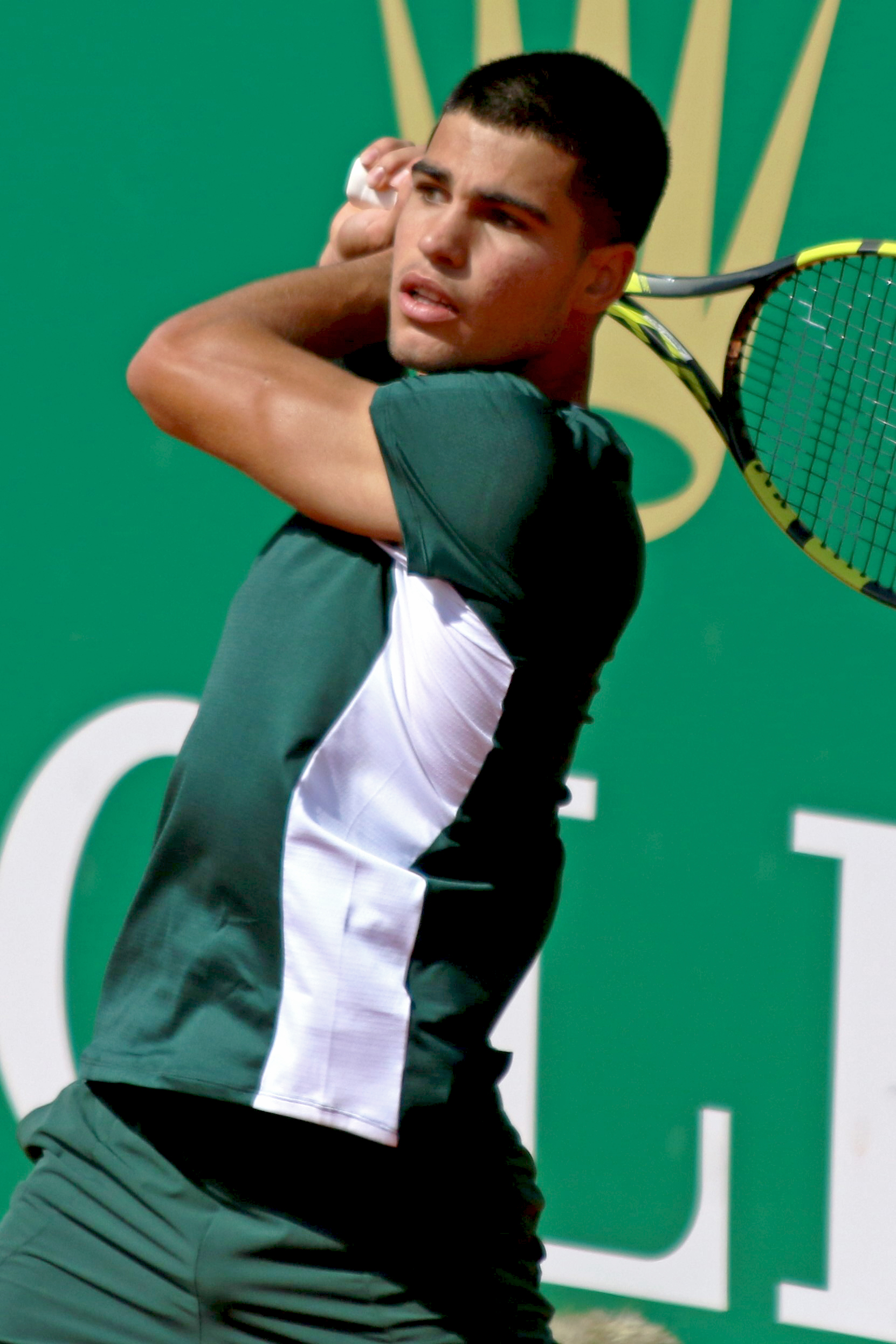
Alcaraz

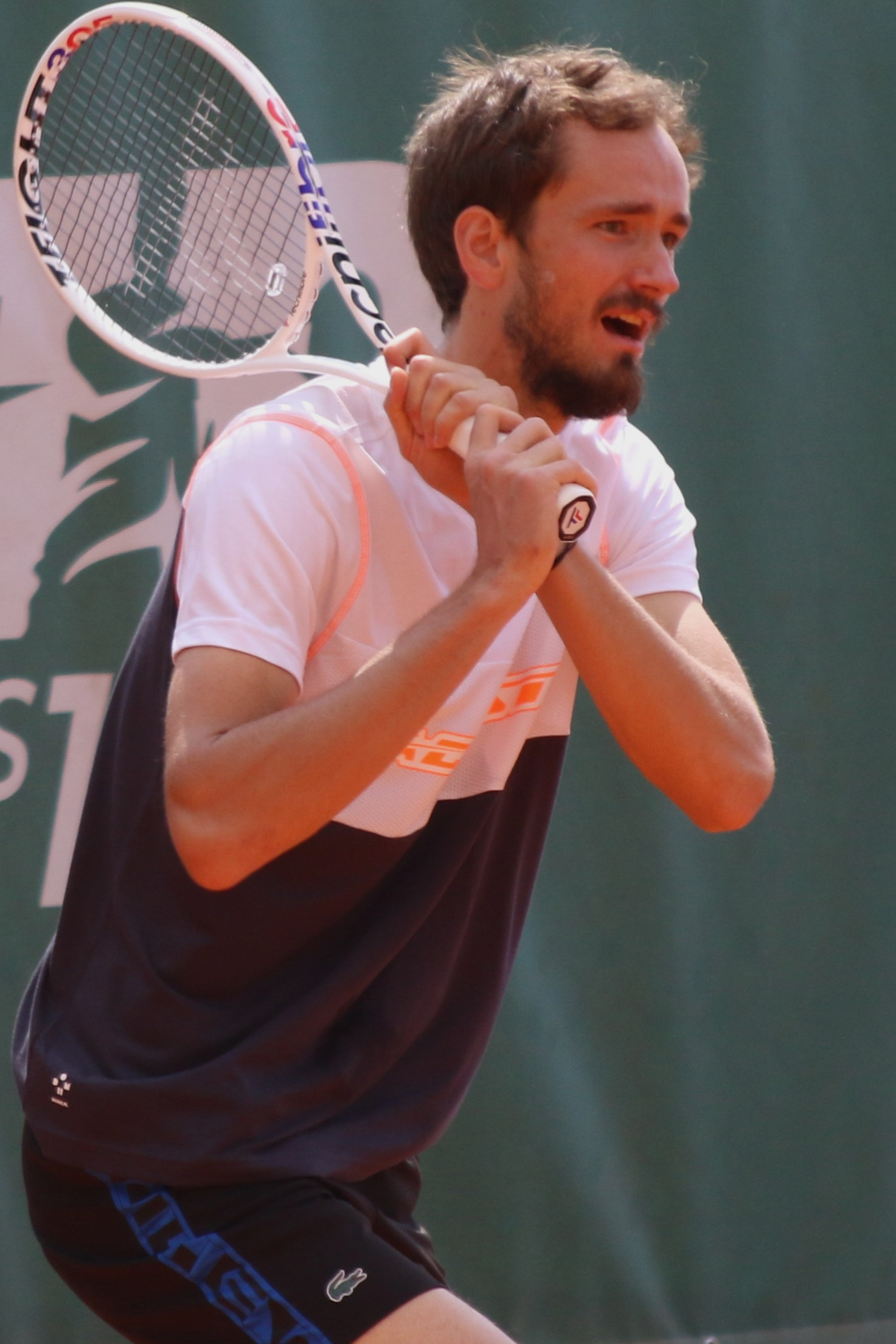
Medvedev

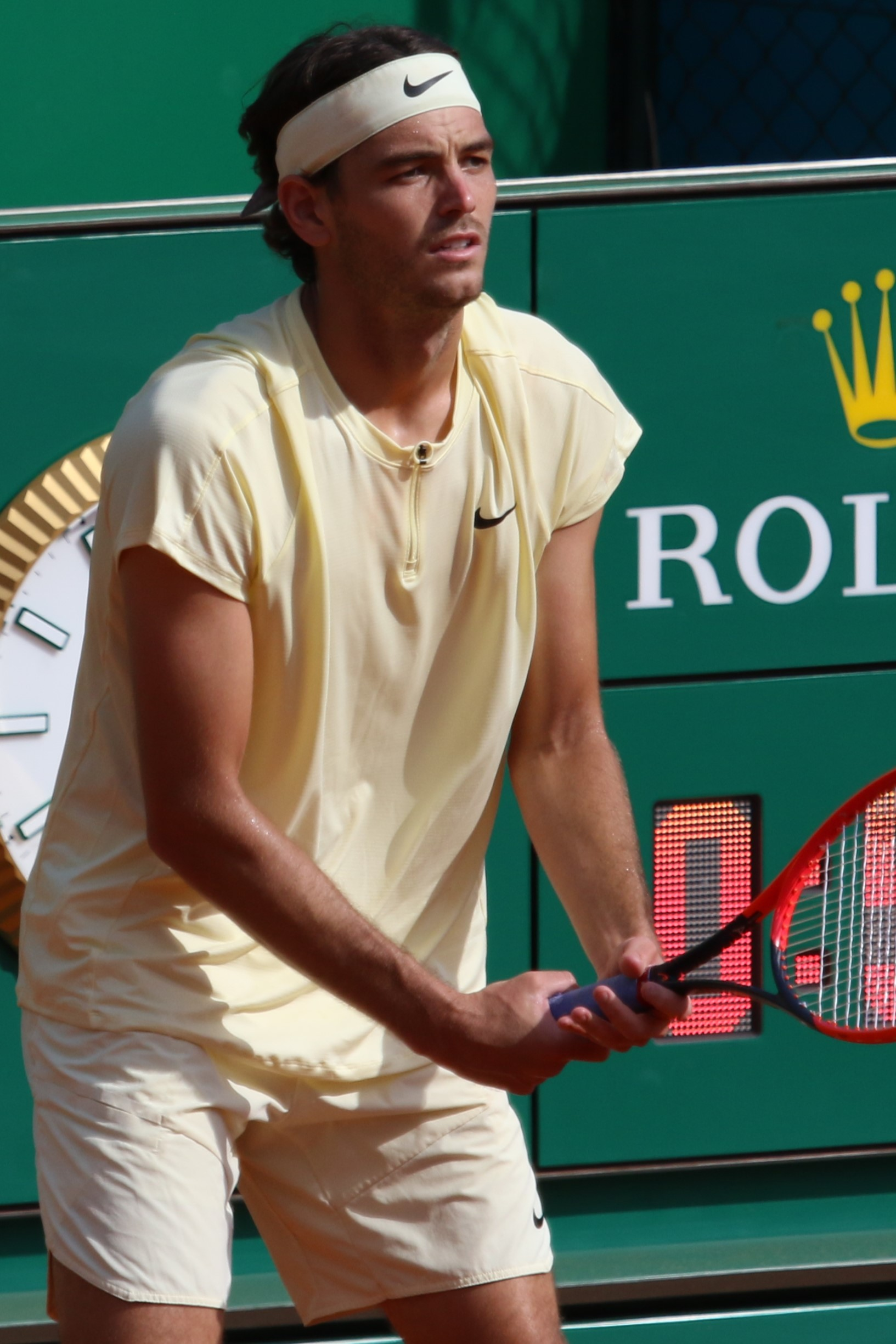
Fritz

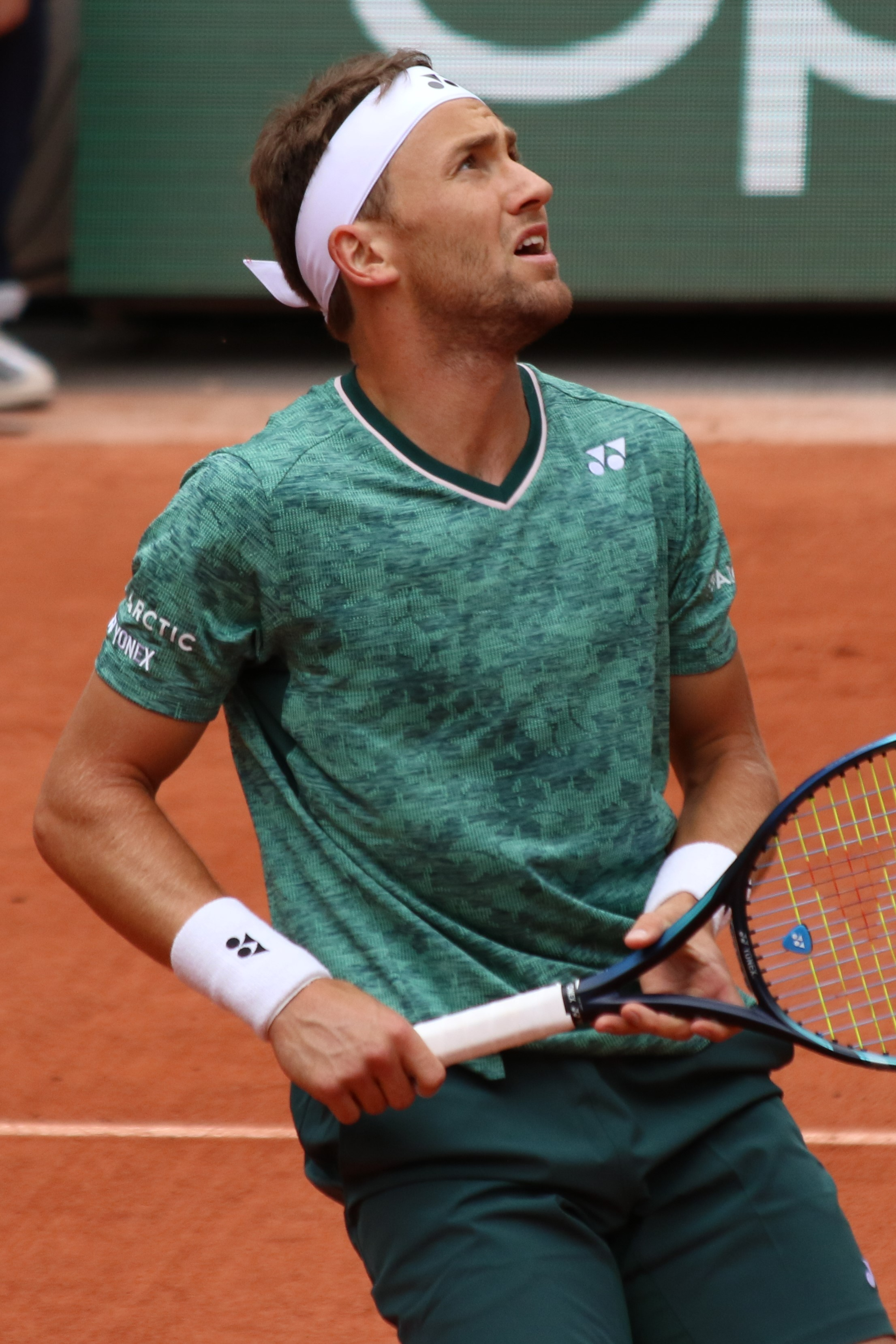
Ruud

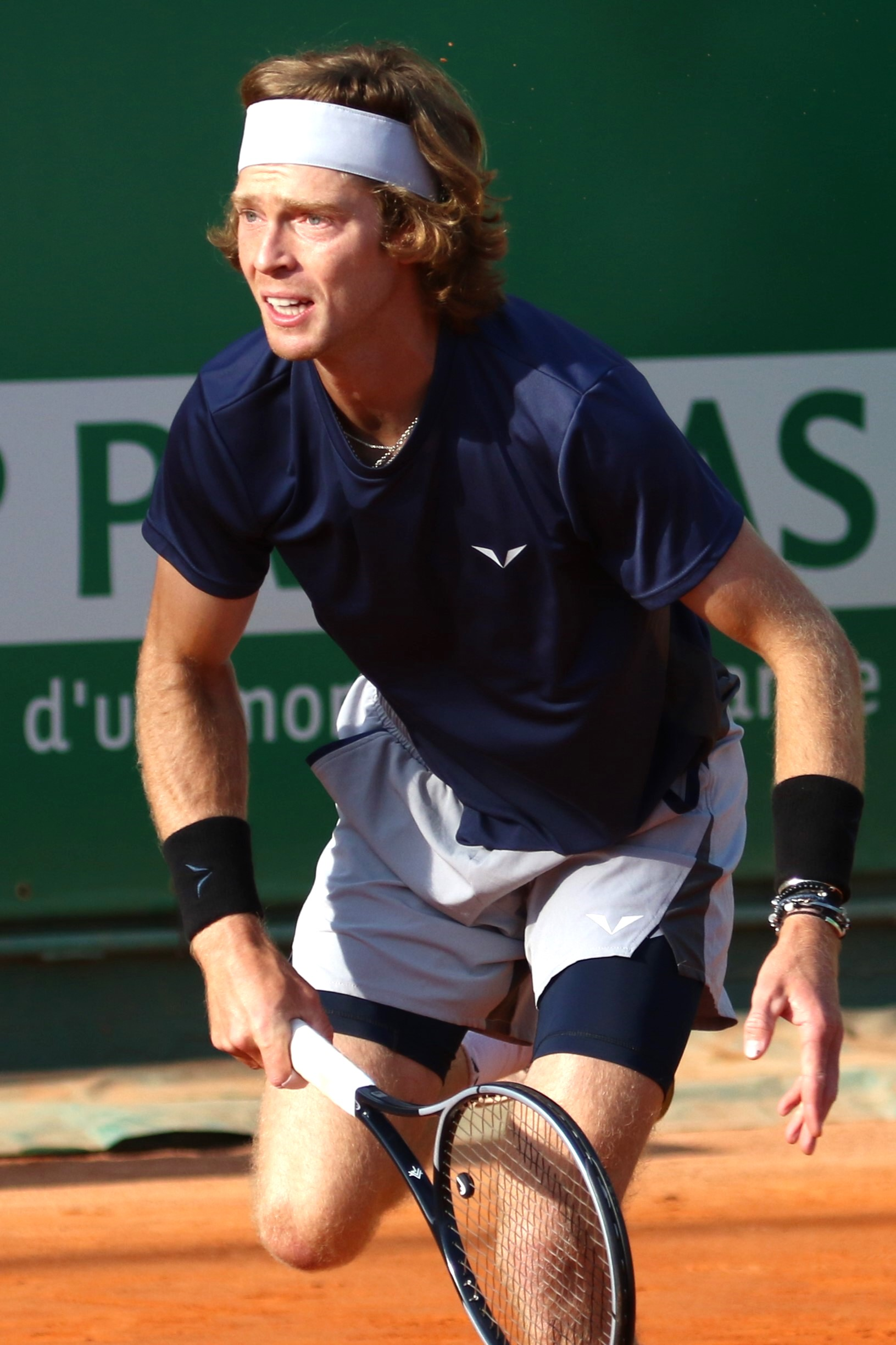
Rublev

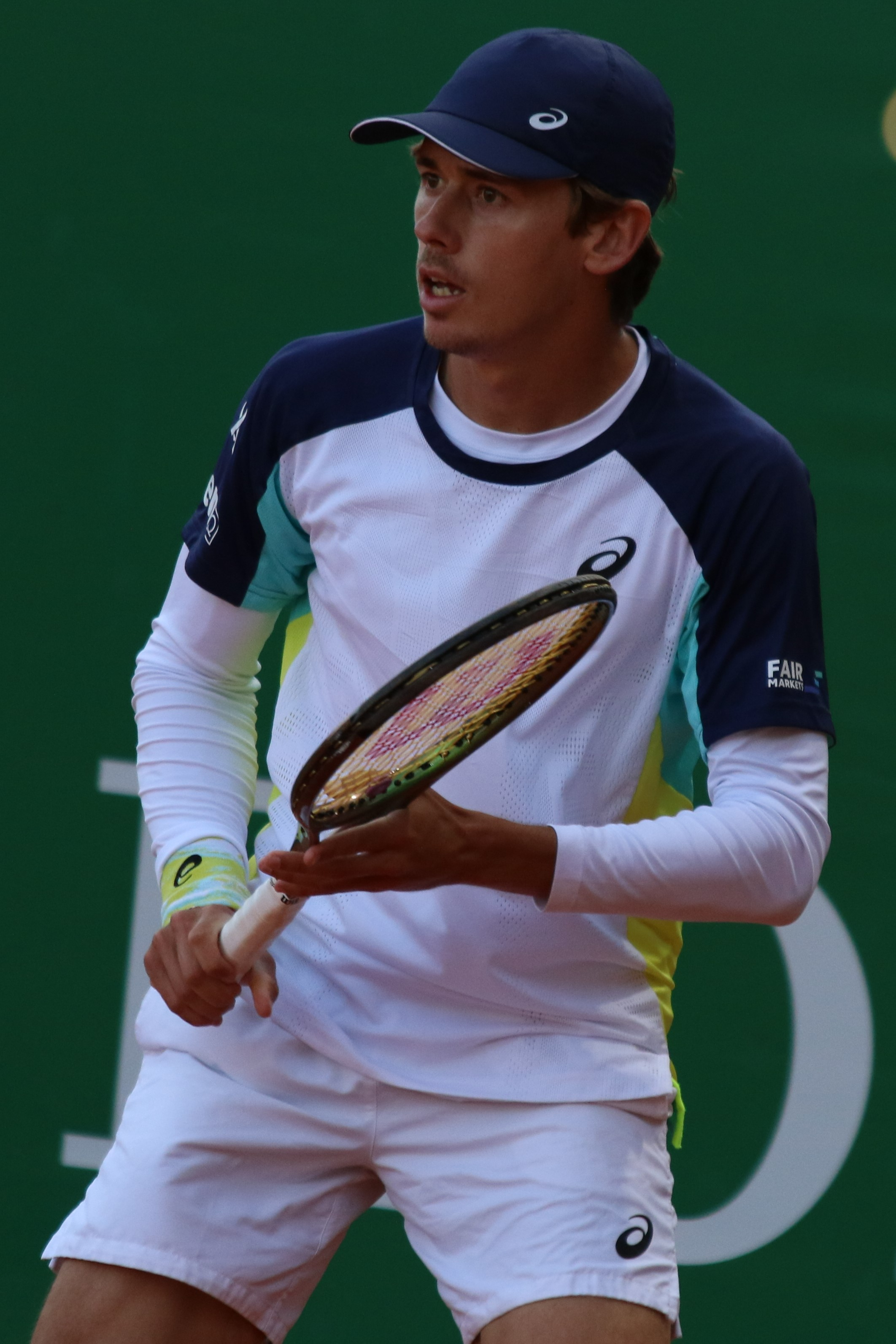
de Minaur

=== Doubles ===
#	Players	Date qualified
1	(El Salvador) Marcelo Arévalo (Croatia) Mate Pavić	28 August
2	(Spain) Marcel Granollers (Argentina) Horacio Zeballos	29 August
3	(Netherlands) Wesley Koolhof (Croatia) Nikola Mektić	28 October
4	(Italy) Simone Bolelli (Italy) Andrea Vavassori	9 October
5	(Australia) Max Purcell (Australia) Jordan Thompson	26 October
6	(India) Rohan Bopanna (Australia) Matthew Ebden	28 October
7	(Finland) Harri Heliövaara (United Kingdom) Henry Patten	28 October
8	(Germany) Kevin Krawietz (Germany) Tim Pütz	28 October

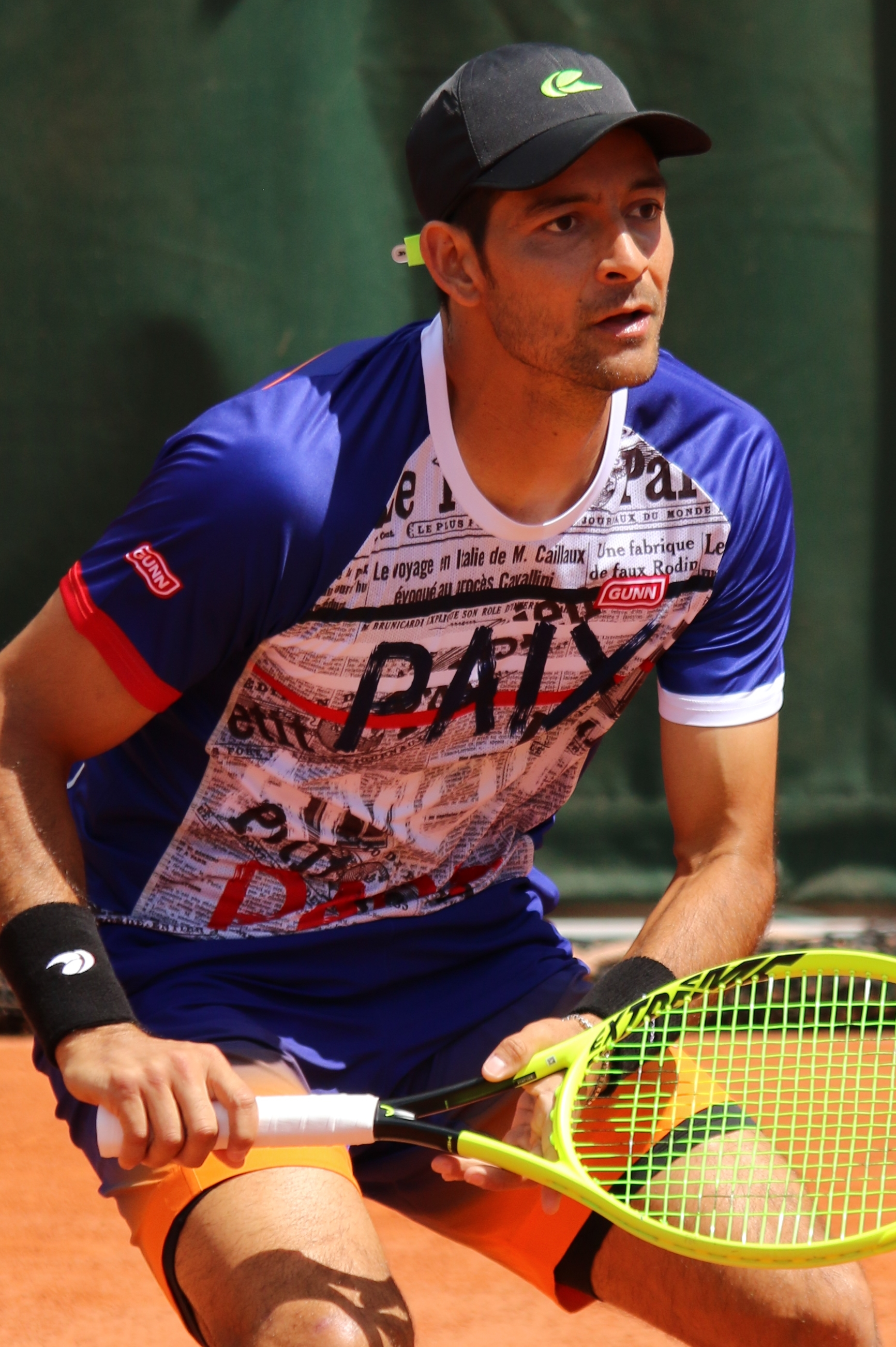
Arévalo

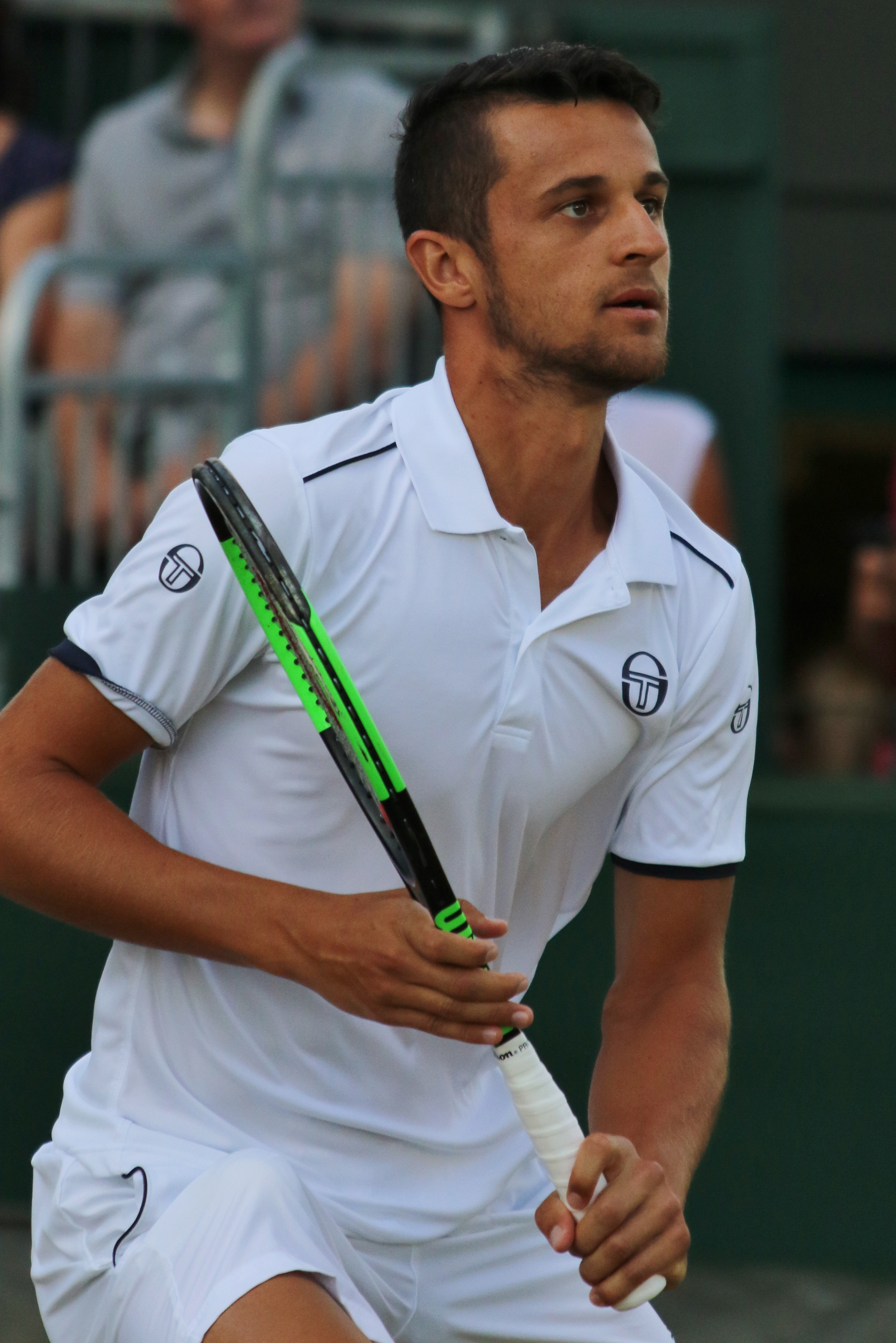
Pavić

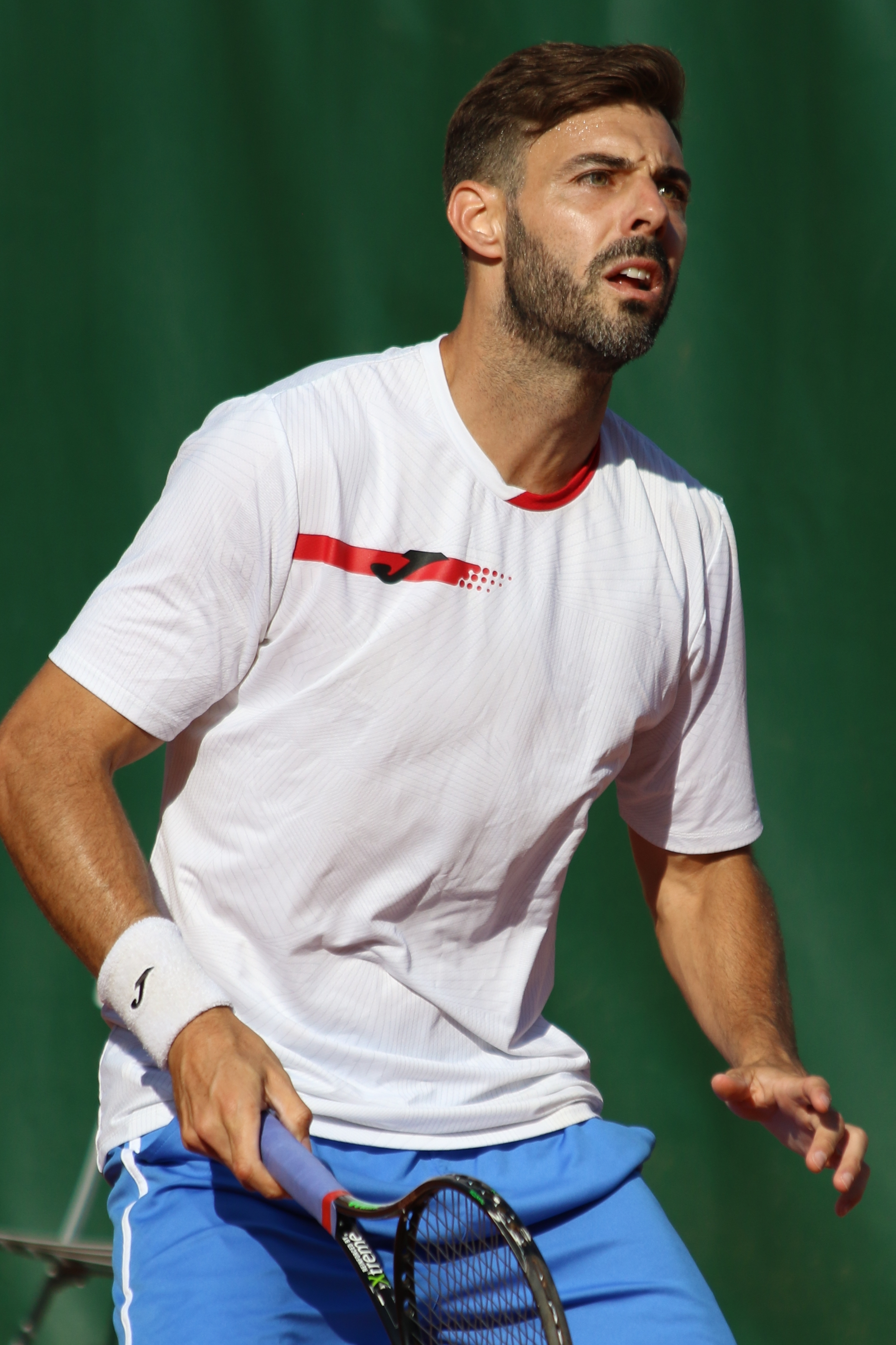
Granollers

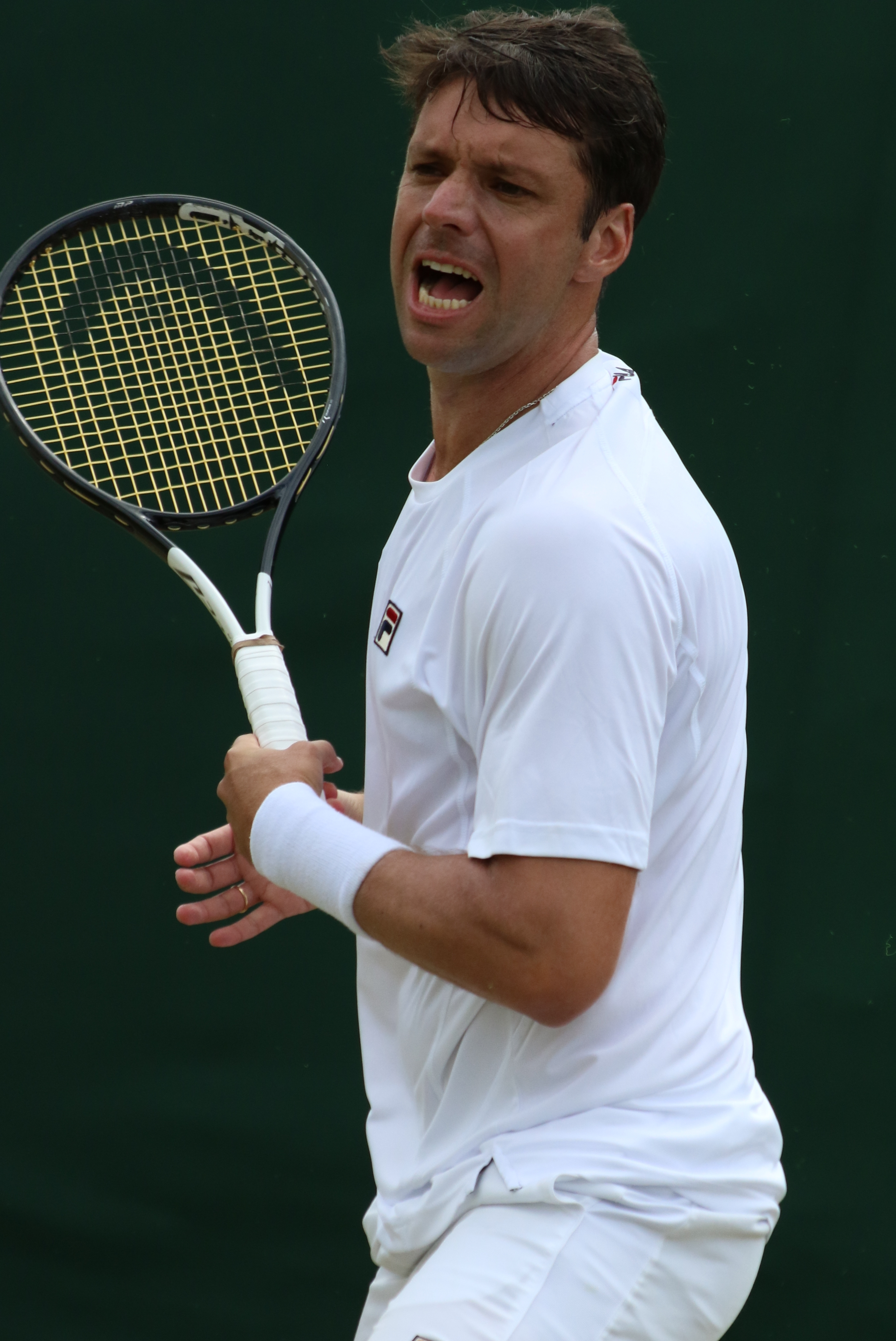
Zeballos

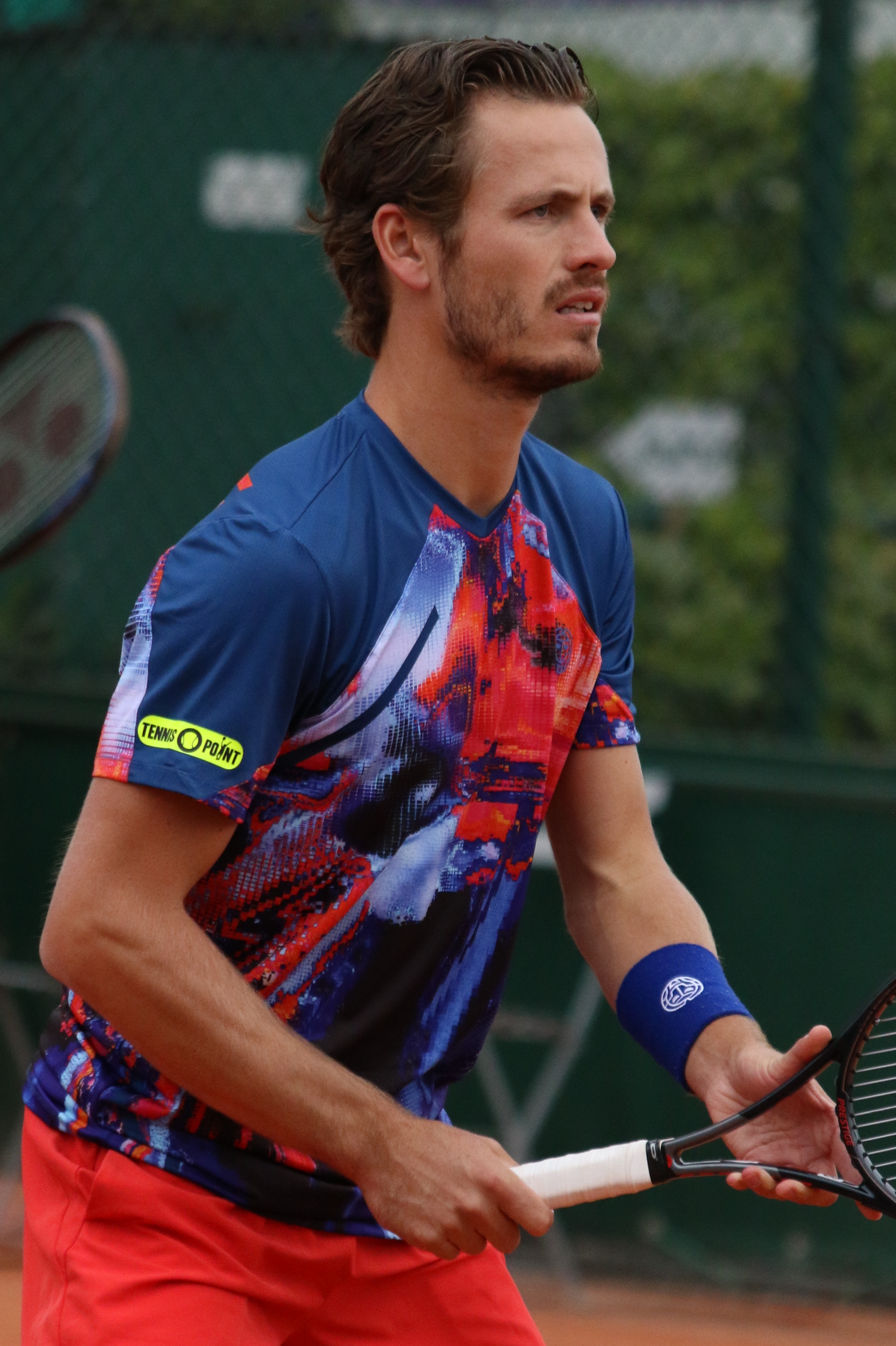
Koolhof

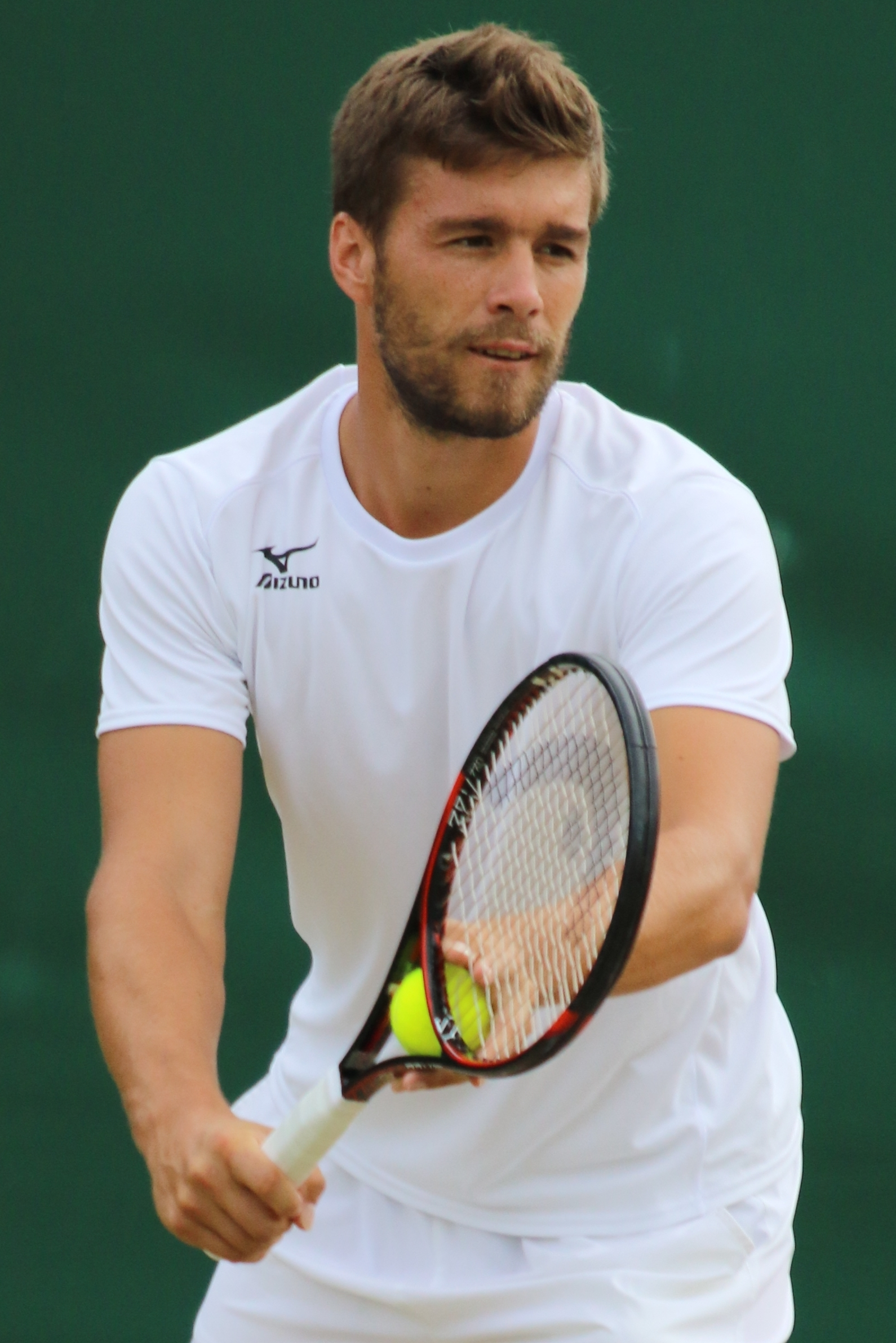
Mektić

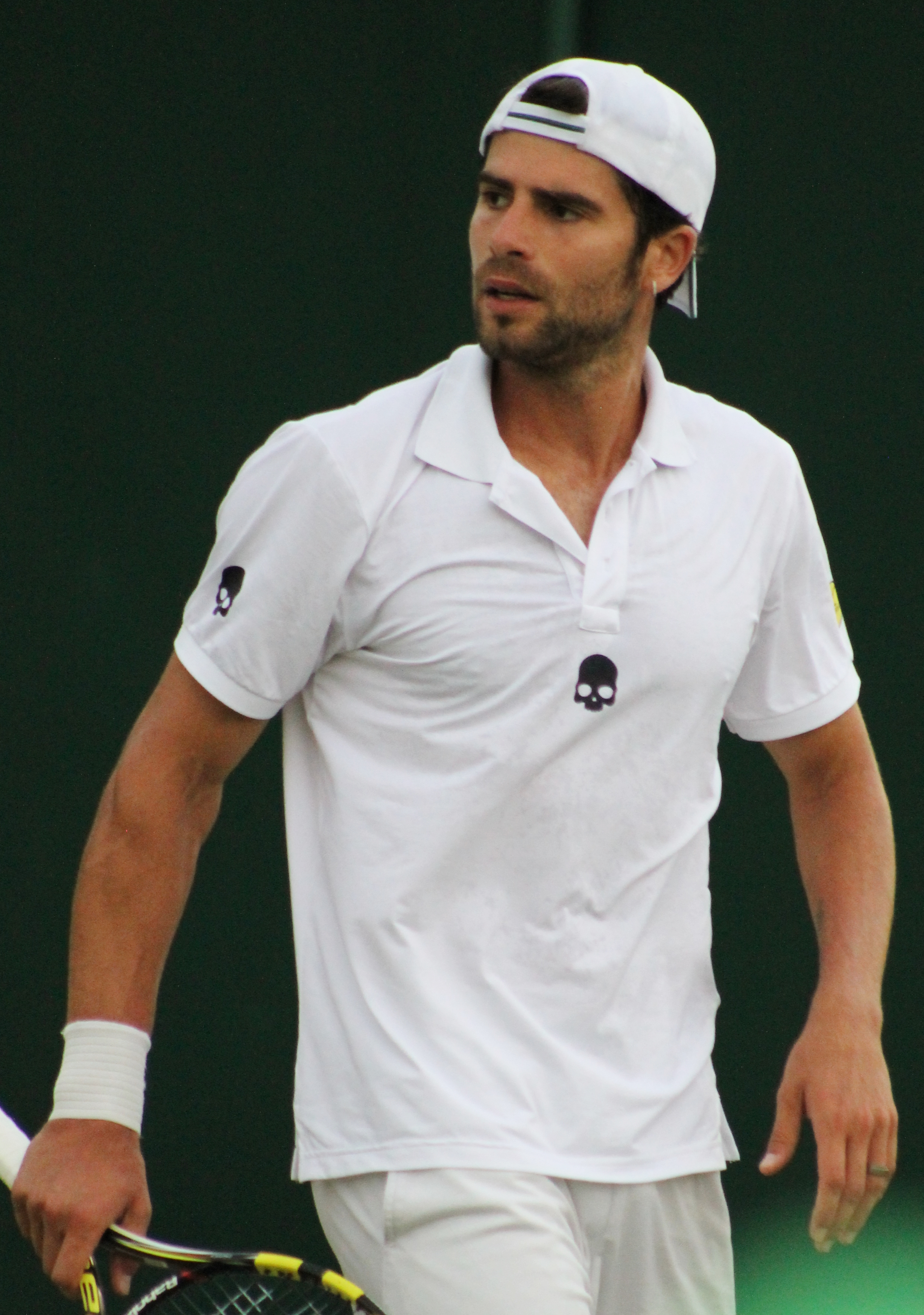
Bolelli

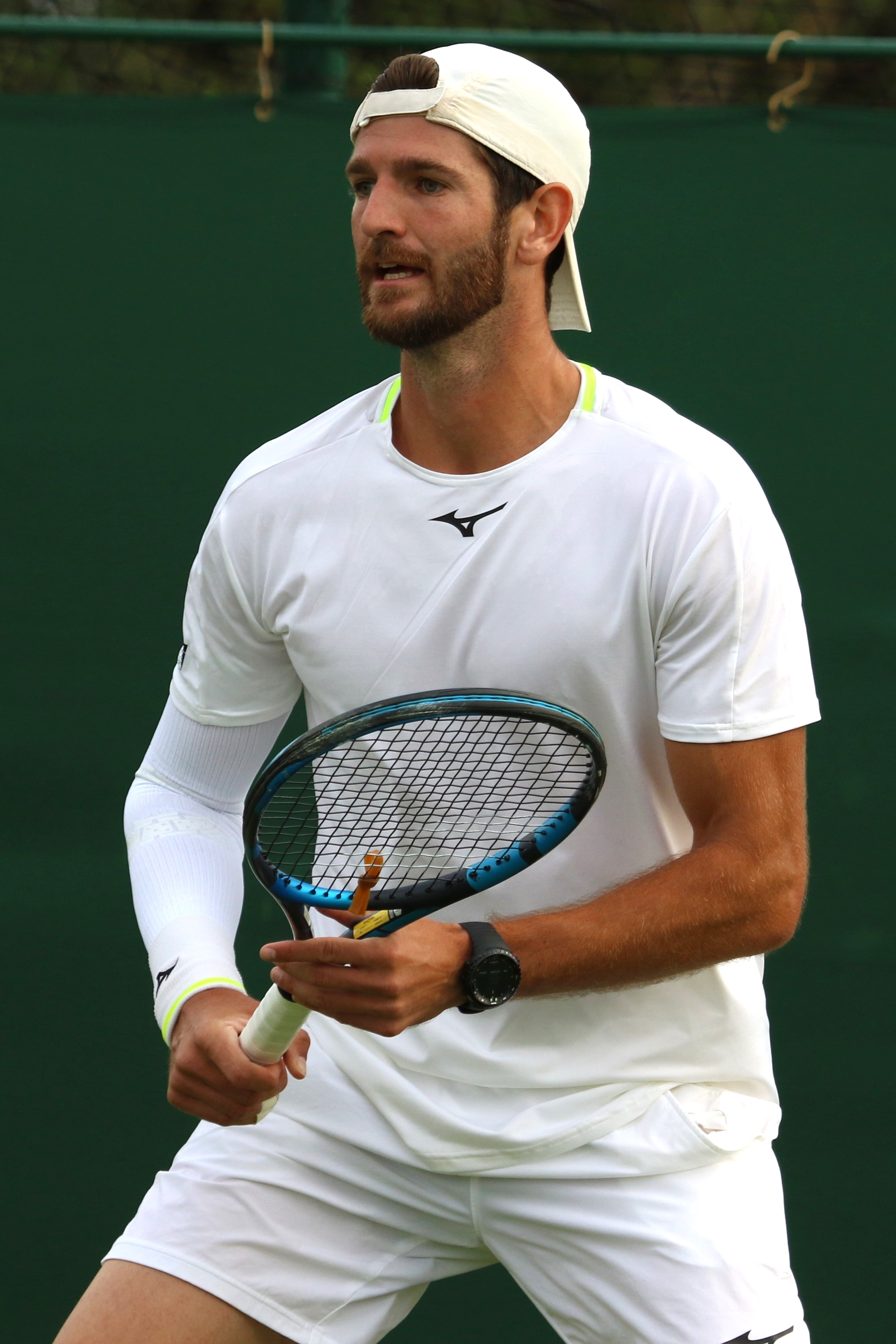
Vavassori

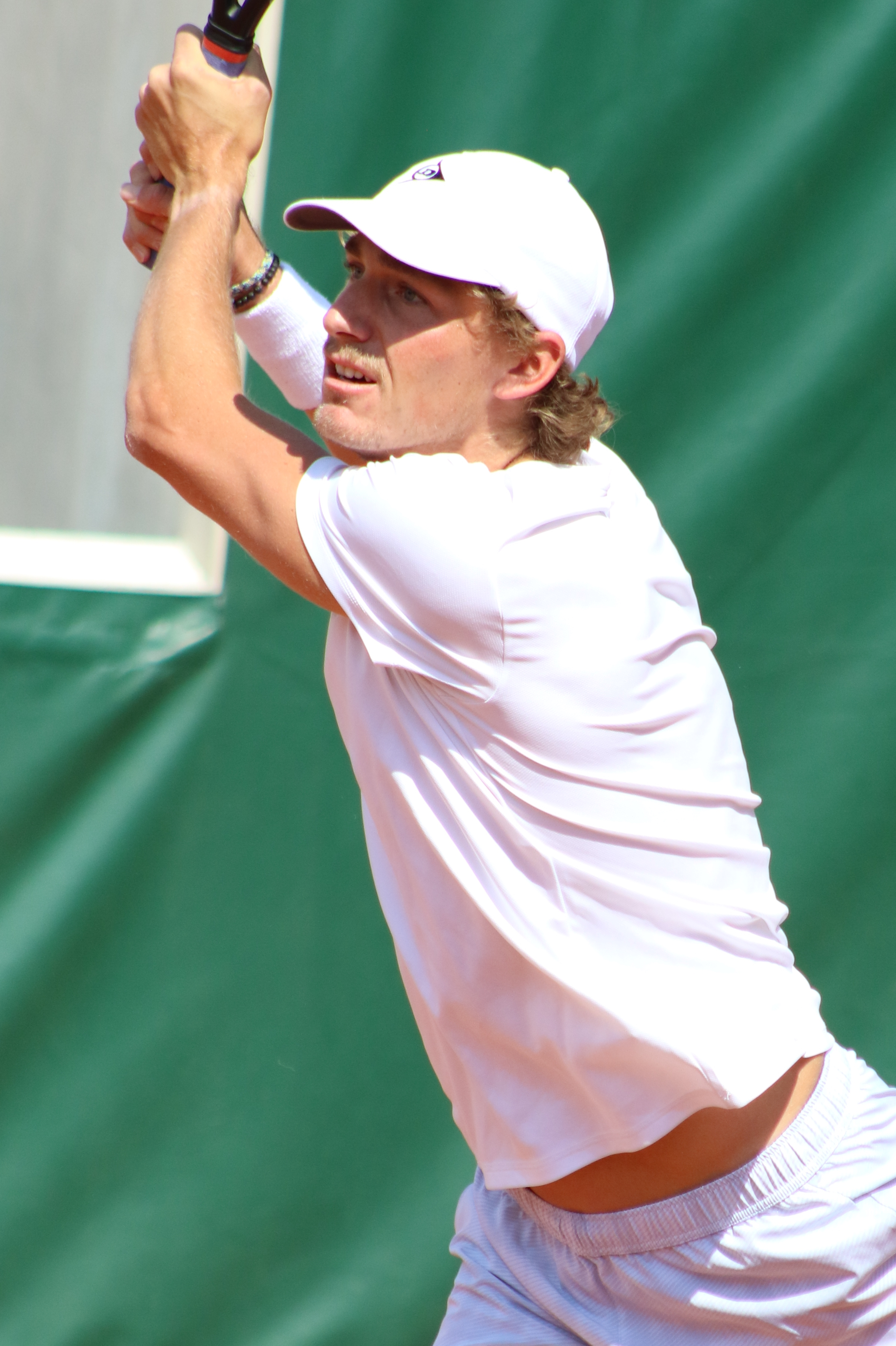
Purcell

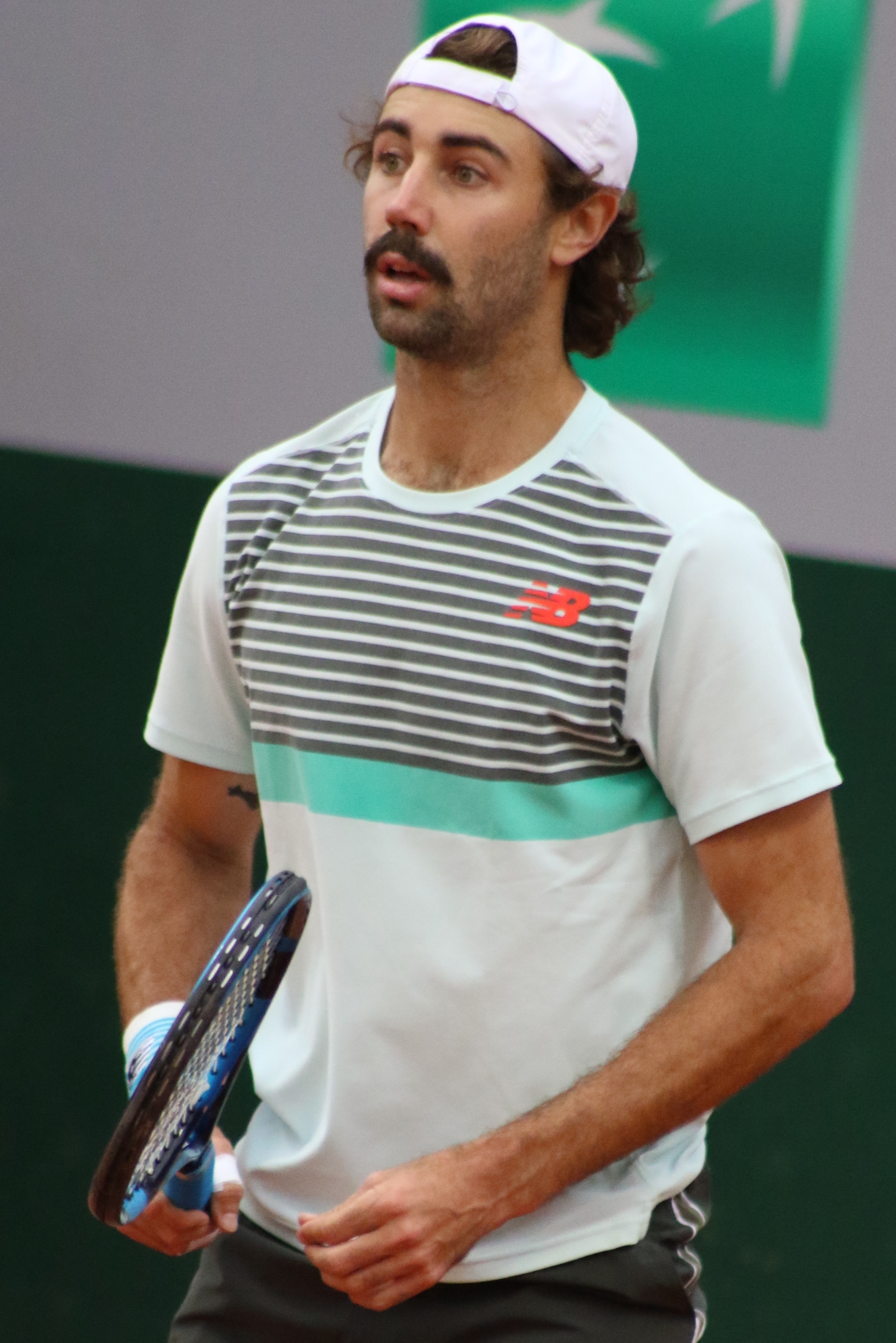
Thompson

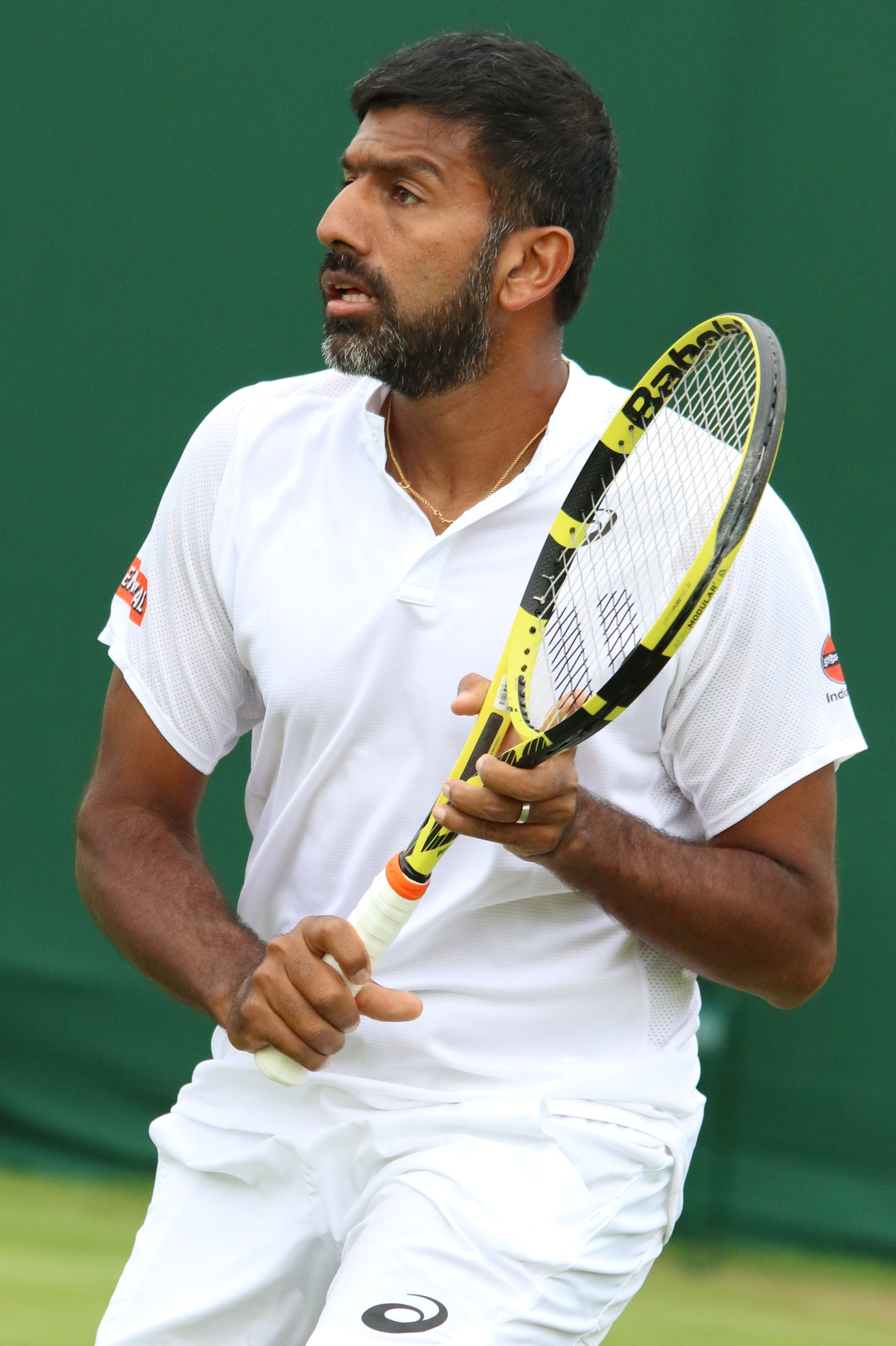
Bopanna

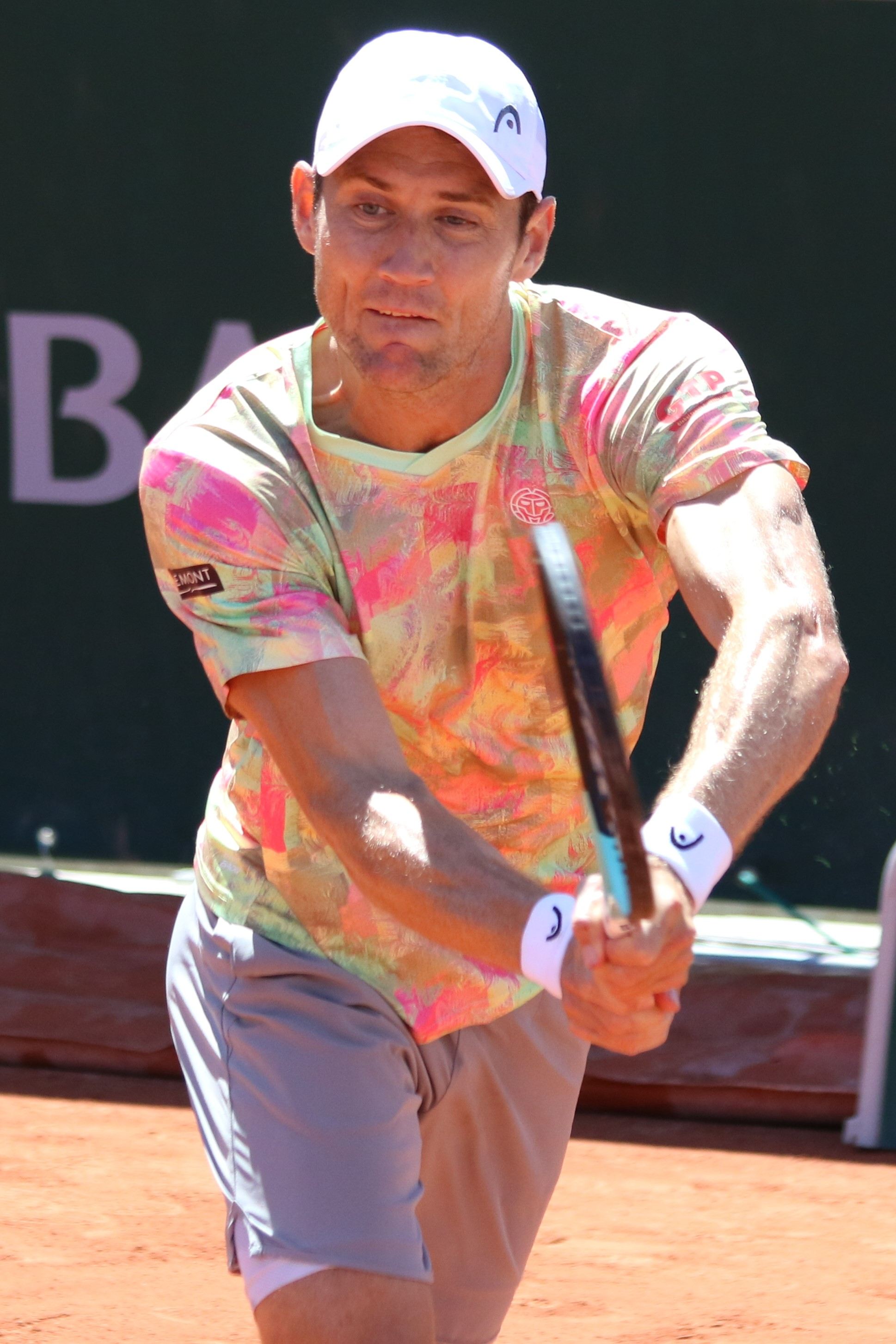
Ebden

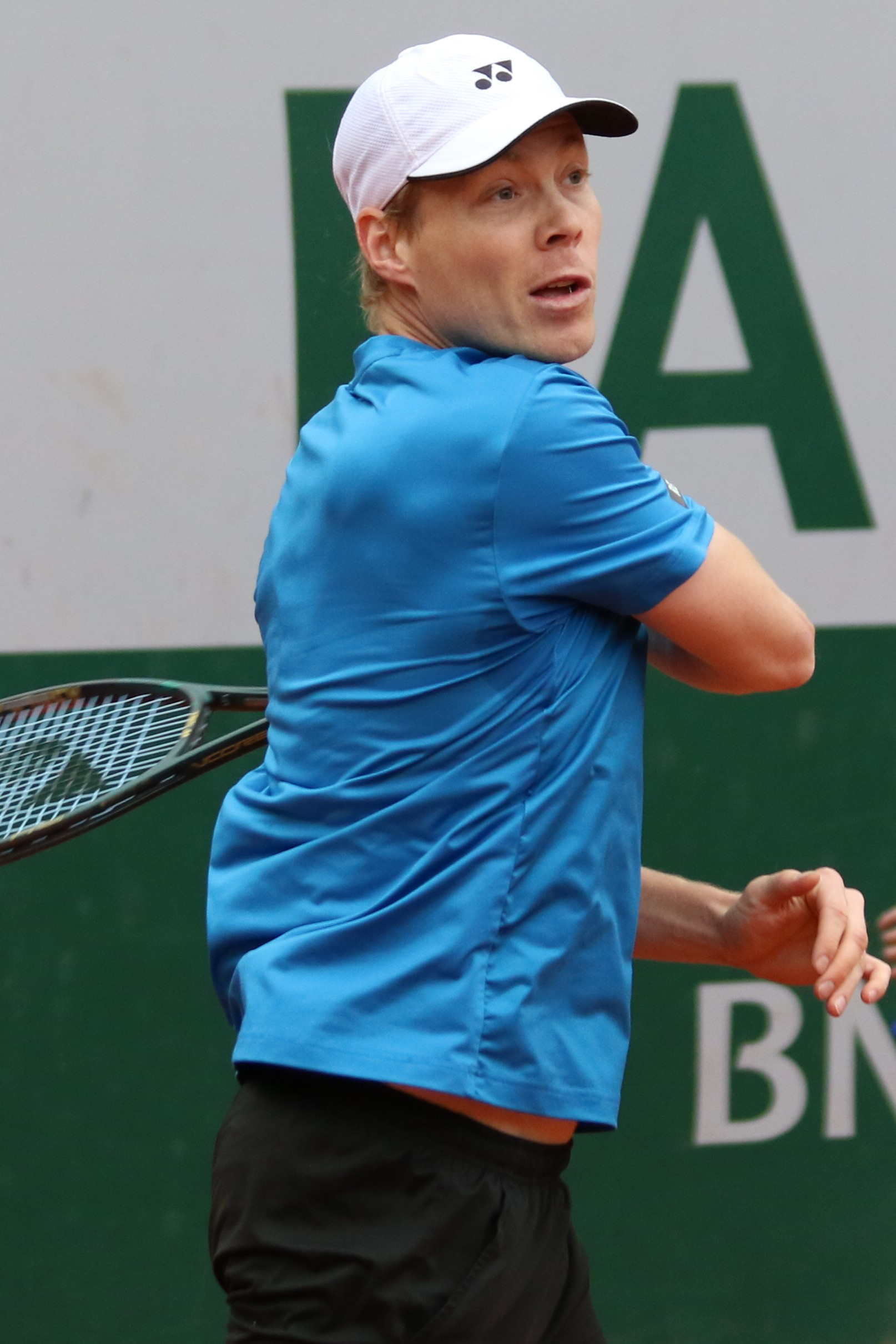
Heliövaara

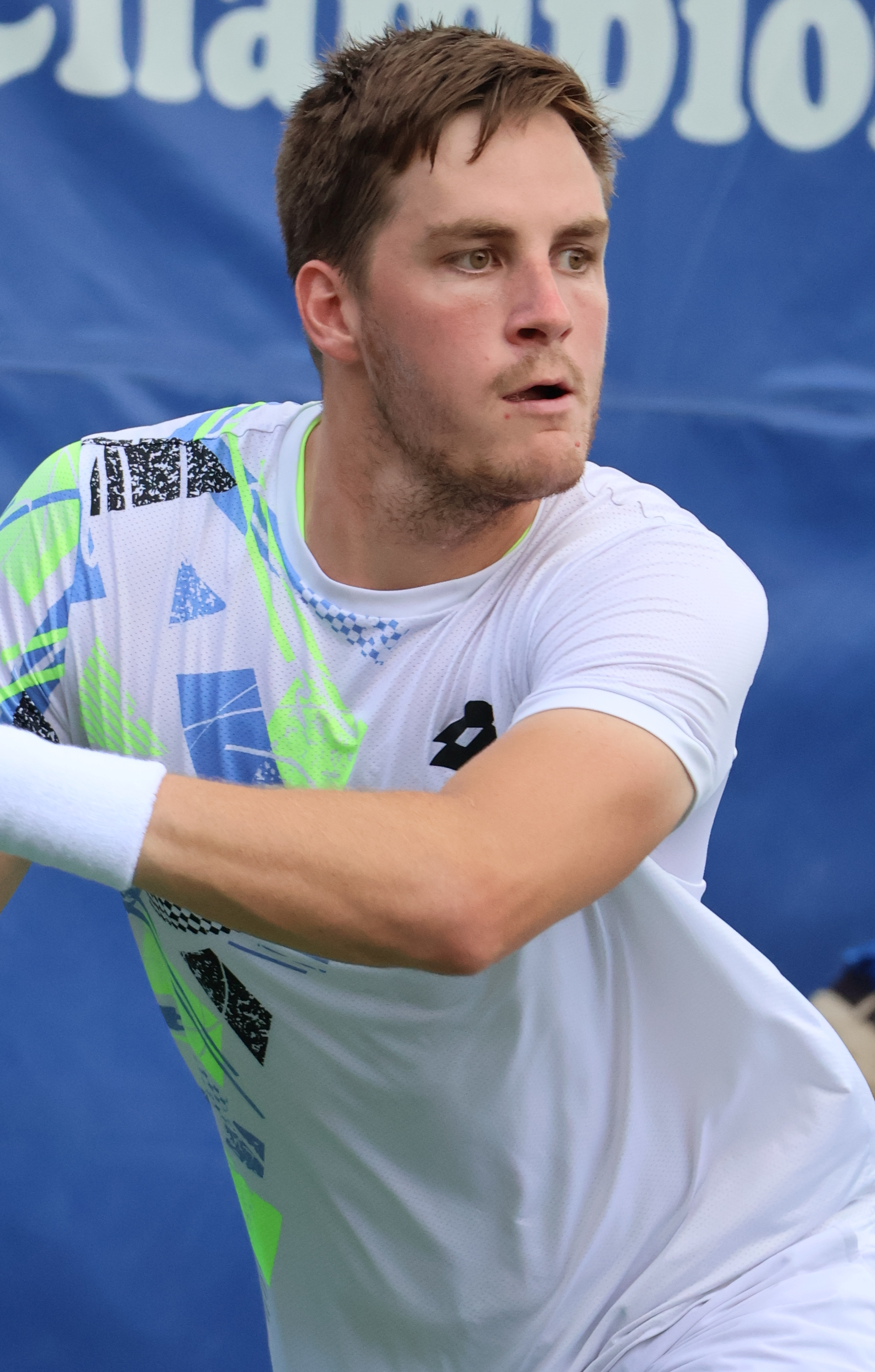
Patten

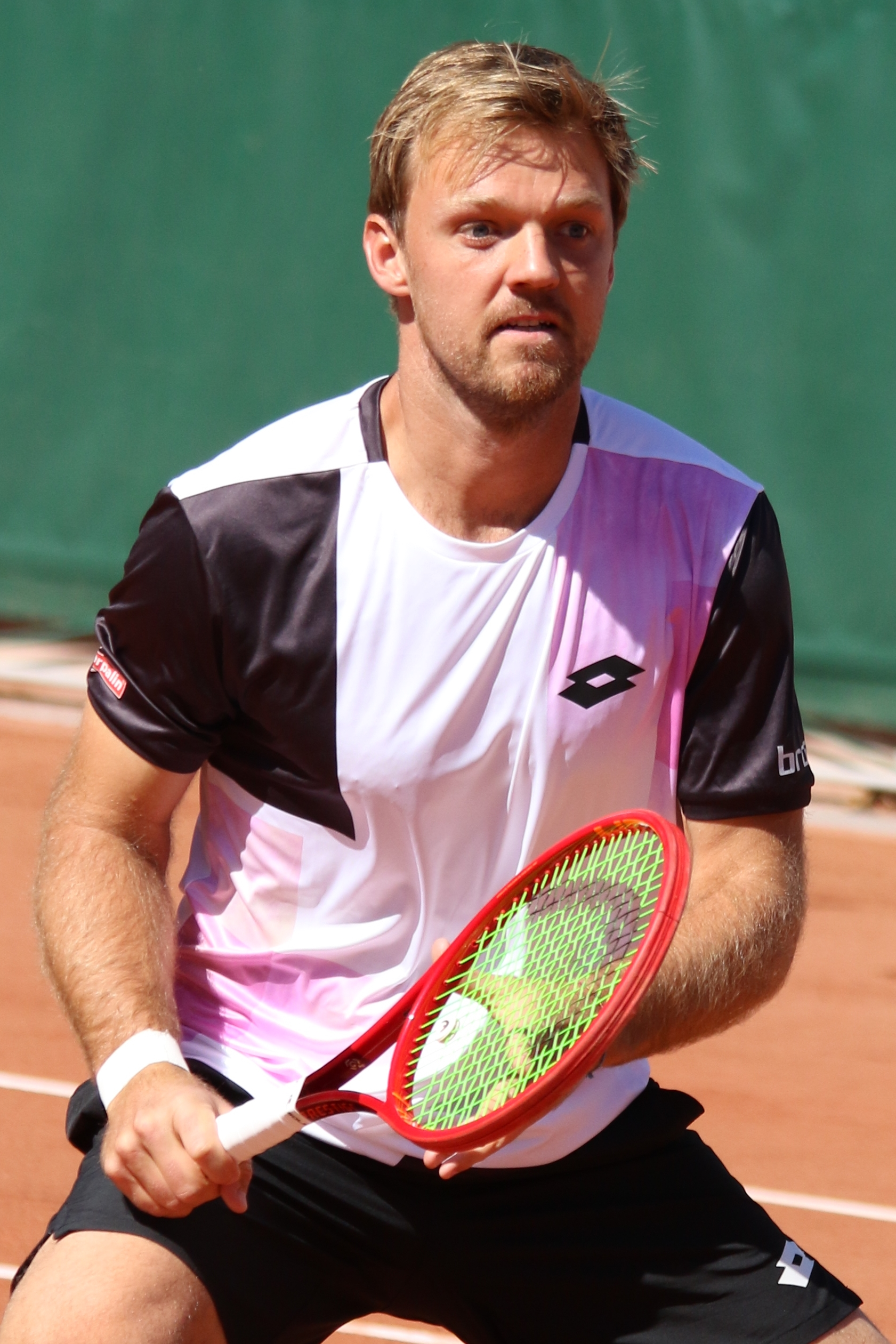
Krawietz

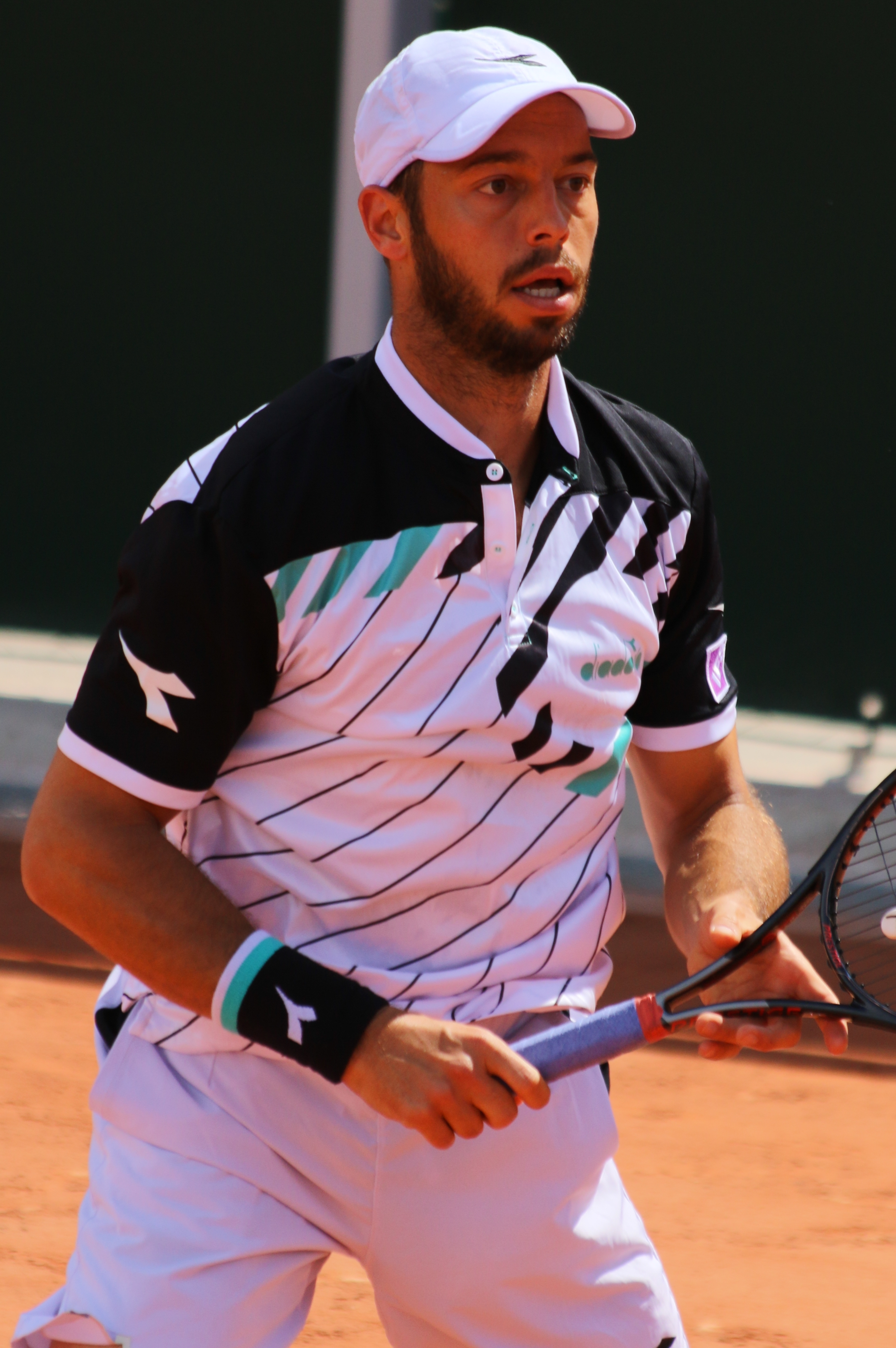
Pütz

== Points breakdown ==
=== Singles ===
† Player qualified for ATP Finals.
- Player qualified but withdrew due to injury.

Seed	Player	Grand Slam				ATP Masters 1000 (mandatory) (Note: Player can replace points from up to three mandatory Masters 1000 with other next-best results. Ranking points are shown in italics in these cases.)								Best other							Total points	Tourn	Titles
Seed	Player	AUS	FRA	WIM	USO	IW	MI	MA	IT	CA	CI	SH	PA	1	2	3	4	5	6	7	Total points	Tourn	Titles
1^{†}	(Italy) Jannik Sinner	W 2000	SF; 800	QF; 400	W 2000	SF; 0 (Note: Despite reaching the semifinal at Indian Wells, Sinner's accumulated points and result from the event were rescinded following two failed anti-doping tests during and after the tournament.)	W 1000	QF; 200	A 0	QF; 200	W 1000	W 1000	A 0	W 500	W 500	SF; 400	F 330				10,330	14	7
2^{†}	(Germany) Alexander Zverev	SF; 800	F 1300	R16; 200	QF; 400	QF; 200	SF; 400	R16; 100	W 1000	QF; 200	SF; 400	R16; 100	W 1000	W 335	F 330	SF; 200	R16; 100	QF; 100	SF; 100	QF; 50	7,315	20	3
3^{†}	(Spain) Carlos Alcaraz	QF; 400	W 2000	W 2000	R64; 50	W 1000	QF; 200	QF; 200	A 0	A 0	R32; 10	QF; 200	R16; 100	W 500	SF; 100	R16; 50	R32; 0				6,810	14	4
4^{†}	Daniil Medvedev	F 1300	R16; 200	SF; 800	QF; 400	F 650	SF; 400	QF; 200	R16; 100	R32; 10	R32; 10	QF; 200	R32; 10	SF; 200	SF; 200	R16; 100	R16; 50				4,830	16	0
5^{†}	(United States) Taylor Fritz	QF; 400	R16; 200	QF; 400	F 1300	R16; 100	R64; 10	SF; 400	QF; 200	R32; 50	R64; 10	SF; 400	R32; 10	W 250	W 250	F 165	QF; 100	RR; 45	R64; 10	R32; 0	4,300	21	2
–	(Serbia) Novak Djokovic	SF; 800	QF; 400	F 1300	R32; 100	R32; 50	A 0	A 0	R32; 50	A 0	A 0	F 650	A 0	SF; 400	SF; 100	QF; 60					3,910	10	1
6^{†}	(Norway) Casper Ruud	R32; 100	SF; 800	R64; 50	R16; 200	QF; 200	R16; 100	R16; 100	R64; 10	R16; 100	R32; 10	QF; 50	R32; 10	F 650	W 500	F 330	W 250	F 165	QF; 130	SF; 100	3,855	24	2
7^{†}	Andrey Rublev	QF; 400	R32; 100	R128; 10	R16; 200	R32; 50	QF; 50	W 1000	R32; 50	F 650	QF; 200	QF; 50	QF; 50	W 250	SF; 200	QF; 100	QF; 100	QF; 100	QF; 100	SF; 100	3,760	26	2
8^{†}	(Australia) Alex de Minaur	R16; 200	QF; 400	QF; 400	QF; 400	R16; 100	R16; 100	QF; 50	R16; 100	A 0	A 0	A 0	QF; 200	W 500	F 330	SF; 265	W 250	QF; 200	SF; 200	R16; 50	3,745	19	2
Alternates
9	(Bulgaria) Grigor Dimitrov	R32; 100	QF; 400	R16; 200	QF; 400	R16; 100	F 650	R64; 10	R16; 100	R16; 100	R32; 10	R16; 100	QF; 200	W 250	SF; 200	F 165	F 165	R16; 100	R16; 50	R16; 50	3,350	19	1
10	(Greece) Stefanos Tsitsipas	R16; 200	QF; 400	R64; 50	R128; 10	R16; 100	R64; 10	QF; 50	QF; 200	QF; 15	R32; 50	R16; 100	QF; 200	W 1000	F 330	QF; 100	QF; 100	SF; 100	SF; 100	R16; 50	3,165	22	1

=== Doubles ===
† Team qualified for ATP Finals.

Seed	Team	Points																			Total points	Tourn	Titles
Seed	Team	1	2	3	4	5	6	7	8	9	10	11	12	13	14	15	16	17	18	19	Total points	Tourn	Titles
1^{†}	(El Salvador) Marcelo Arévalo (Croatia) Mate Pavić	W 2000	W 1000	SF; 720	F 600	QF; 360	SF; 360	SF; 360	W 250	W 250	R16; 180	SF; 180	SF; 180	R16; 90	R16; 90	SF; 90	R32; 0	R32; 0	R16; 0	R16; 0	6,710	22	4
2^{†}	(Spain) Marcel Granollers (Argentina) Horacio Zeballos	W 1000	W 1000	SF; 720	SF; 720	F 600	QF; 360	SF; 360	SF; 360	SF; 360	SF; 360	R16; 180	F 150	F 150	R16; 90	QF; 90	R16; 0	R16; 0			6,500	17	2
3^{†}	(Netherlands) Wesley Koolhof (Croatia) Nikola Mektić	W 1000	W 1000	W 1000	W 500	QF; 360	F 300	W 250	R16; 180	QF; 180	SF; 180	F 150	R32; 90	R32; 90	R16; 90	R16; 90	R16; 90	QF; 90	QF; 90	QF; 45	5,775	21	4
4^{†}	(Italy) Simone Bolelli (Italy) Andrea Vavassori	F 1200	F 1200	W 500	W 500	SF; 360	SF; 360	W 250	R16; 180	QF; 180	QF; 180	QF; 180	QF; 180	SF; 180	R16; 90	R64; 0	R32; 0	R16; 0	R16; 0		5,540	18	3
5^{†}	(Australia) Max Purcell (Australia) Jordan Thompson	W 2000	F 1200	SF; 360	W 250	W 250	W 250	R16; 180	SF; 180	R32; 90	R16; 90	R16; 90	R16; 90	SF; 90	SF; 90	QF; 45	R16; 0				5,255	16	4
6^{†}	(India) Rohan Bopanna (Australia) Matthew Ebden	W 2000	W 1000	SF; 720	R16; 180	QF; 180	F 150	R32; 90	R16; 90	R16; 90	R16; 90	QF; 90	QF; 90	QF; 90	R32; 0	R16; 0	R32; 0				4,860	16	2
7^{†}	(Finland) Harri Heliövaara (United Kingdom) Henry Patten	W 2000	F 300	W 250	W 250	W 250	R16; 180	R16; 180	QF; 180	QF; 180	SF; 180	W 175	F 150	W 100	QF; 90	SF; 90	QF; 32	R32; 0	R32; 0	R32; 0	4,587	19	6
8^{†}	(Germany) Kevin Krawietz (Germany) Tim Pütz	F 1200	W 500	QF; 360	QF; 360	SF; 360	SF; 360	F 300	R16; 180	QF; 180	QF; 180	F 150	R16; 90	R16; 90	R16; 90	QF; 90	R16; 0	R16; 0	R16; 0		4,490	18	1
Alternates
9	(United States) Nathaniel Lammons (United States) Jackson Withrow	SF; 720	W 500	W 250	W 250	W 250	R32; 180	R16; 180	QF; 180	QF; 180	QF; 180	SF; 180	R16; 90	R16; 90	QF; 90	QF; 90	SF; 90	SF; 90	QF; 45	QF; 45	3,680	34	4
10	(Argentina) Máximo González (Argentina) Andrés Molteni	F 600	W 500	QF; 360	QF; 360	QF; 360	W 250	R16; 180	SF; 180	R16; 90	QF; 90	SF; 90	QF; 45	R32; 0	R32; 0	R32; 0	R32; 0	R32; 0	R16; 0	R16; 0	3,105	19	2

== Head-to-head records ==
Below are the head-to-head records as they approached the tournament.

=== Singles ===
		Sinner	Zverev	Alcaraz	Medvedev	Fritz	Ruud	de Minaur	Rublev	Overall	YTD W–L
1	(Italy) Jannik Sinner		2–4	4–6	7–7	2–1	2–0	7–0	6–3	30–21	65–6
2	(Germany) Alexander Zverev	4–2		5–5	7–12	5–6	3–2	8–2	6–3	38–32	66–20
3	(Spain) Carlos Alcaraz	6–4	5–5		6–2	2–0	4–0	2–0	1–1	26–12	52–11
4	Daniil Medvedev	7–7	12–7	2–6		1–0	3–0	6–3	7–2	38–25	45–19
5	(United States) Taylor Fritz	1–2	6–5	0–2	0–1		1–2	3–5	5–4	16–21	49–21
6	(Norway) Casper Ruud	0–2	2–3	0–4	0–3	2–1		0–2	2–5	6–20	49–23
7	(Australia) Alex de Minaur	0–7	2–8	0–2	3–6	5–3	2–0		4–3	16–29	47–16
8	Andrey Rublev	3–6	3–6	1–1	2–7	4–5	5–2	3–4		21–31	43–23

=== Doubles ===
		Arévalo; Pavić	Granollers; Zeballos	Koolhof; Mektić	Bolelli; Vavassori	Purcell; Thompson	Bopanna; Ebden	Heliövaara; Patten	Krawietz; Pütz	Overall	YTD W–L
1	(El Salvador) Marcelo Arévalo (Croatia) Mate Pavić		1–3	1–0	3–0	0–0	1–0	1–1	2–3	9–7	44–18
2	(Spain) Marcel Granollers (Argentina) Horacio Zeballos	3–1		0–3	2–2	0–2	3–2	1–0	2–0	11–10	42–14
3	(Netherlands) Wesley Koolhof (Croatia) Nikola Mektić	0–1	3–0		0–2	0–1	1–1	1–1	1–0	6–6	43–16
4	(Italy) Simone Bolelli (Italy) Andrea Vavassori	0–3	2–2	2–0		2–0	2–2	1–1	2–1	11–9	41–18
5	(Australia) Max Purcell (Australia) Jordan Thompson	0–0	2–0	1–0	0–2		0–0	1–1	1–0	5–3	39–7
6	(India) Rohan Bopanna (Australia) Matthew Ebden	0–1	2–3	1–1	2–2	0–0		0–0	1–2	6–9	24–14
7	(Finland) Harri Heliövaara (United Kingdom) Henry Patten	1–1	0–1	1–1	1–1	1–1	0–0		0–0	4–5	36–11
8	(Germany) Kevin Krawietz (Germany) Tim Pütz	3–2	0–2	0–1	1–2	0–1	2–1	0–0		6–9	40–18

== See also ==
- ATP rankings
- 2024 ATP Tour
- 2024 WTA Finals
- ATP Finals appearances
