= 2024 Barcelona Open Banc Sabadell =

- Date: 15–21 April
- Edition: 71st
- Category: ATP Tour 500
- Draw: 48S / 16D
- Prize money: €2,782,960
- Surface: Clay
- Location: Barcelona, Spain
- Venue: Real Club de Tenis Barcelona

Champions

Singles
- (Norway) Casper Ruud

Doubles
- (Argentina) Máximo González / (Argentina) Andrés Molteni
- Barcelona Open

The 2024 Barcelona Open Banc Sabadell (also known as the Trofeu Compte de Godó) was a men's tennis tournament played on outdoor clay courts at the Real Club de Tenis Barcelona in Barcelona, Spain, from 15 to 21 April 2024. It was the 71st edition of the event and part of the ATP Tour 500 series of the 2024 ATP Tour.

== Champions ==
=== Singles ===
- (Norway) Casper Ruud def. (Greece) Stefanos Tsitsipas, 7–5, 6–3

=== Doubles ===
- (Argentina) Máximo González / (Argentina) Andrés Molteni def. (Monaco) Hugo Nys / (Poland) Jan Zieliński, 4–6, 6–4, [11–9]

== Singles main-draw entrants ==
=== Seeds ===
Country	Player	Rank^{1}	Seed
~~ESP~~	~~Carlos Alcaraz~~	~~3~~	~~1~~
	Andrey Rublev	6	2
NOR	Casper Ruud	10	3
AUS	Alex de Minaur	11	4
GRE	Stefanos Tsitsipas	12	5
FRA	Ugo Humbert	15	6
	~~Karen Khachanov~~	~~17~~	~~7~~
ARG	Sebastián Báez	19	8
CHI	Nicolás Jarry	21	9
ITA	Lorenzo Musetti	24	10
ESP	Alejandro Davidovich Fokina	29	11
GBR	Cameron Norrie	30	12
ARG	Tomás Martín Etcheverry	31	13
AUS	Jordan Thompson	32	14
CRO	Borna Ćorić	33	15
FRA	Arthur Fils	36	16
HUN	Fábián Marozsán	37	17

- ^{1} Rankings as of 8 April 2024.

=== Other entrants ===
The following players received wildcards into the main draw:

- (Spain) Roberto Bautista Agut
- (Spain) Martín Landaluce
- (Spain) Albert Ramos Viñolas
- (Spain) Daniel Rincón

The following player received entry using a protected ranking:

- (Spain) Rafael Nadal

The following players received entry from the qualifying draw:

- (Croatia) Duje Ajduković
- (Dominican Republic) Nick Hardt
- (France) Harold Mayot
- (Argentina) Diego Schwartzman
- (China) Shang Juncheng
- (Argentina) Marco Trungelliti

The following player received entry as lucky losers:

- (France) Hugo Grenier
- (Italy) Andrea Vavassori

=== Withdrawals ===
- (Spain) Carlos Alcaraz → replaced by (France) Hugo Grenier
- Karen Khachanov → replaced by (Italy) Andrea Vavassori
- (Czech Republic) Jiří Lehečka → replaced by (France) Arthur Cazaux
- (United States) Mackenzie McDonald → replaced by (France) Luca Van Assche
- (Finland) Emil Ruusuvuori → replaced by (Argentina) Pedro Cachín

== Doubles main-draw entrants ==
=== Seeds ===
Country	Player	Country	Player	Rank^{1}	Seed
ESP	Marcel Granollers	ARG	Horacio Zeballos	11	1
CRO	Ivan Dodig	GBR	Neal Skupski	13	2
USA	Rajeev Ram	GBR	Joe Salisbury	17	3
MEX	Santiago González	FRA	Édouard Roger-Vasselin	23	4

- Rankings are as of 8 April 2024.

=== Other entrants ===
The following pairs received wildcards into the doubles main draw:

- (Spain) Roberto Carballés Baena / (Spain) Jaume Munar
- (Spain) Daniel Rincón / (Spain) Oriol Roca Batalla

The following pair received entry from the qualifying draw:

- (Czech Republic) Tomáš Macháč / (China) Zhang Zhizhen
