= 2024 Monte-Carlo Masters – Doubles =

Doubles
- 2024 Monte-Carlo Masters

Final
- Champions: (Belgium) Sander Gillé (Belgium) Joran Vliegen
- Runners-up: (Brazil) Marcelo Melo (Germany) Alexander Zverev
- Score: 5–7, 6–3, [10–5]

Events
Singles	Doubles
← 2023 ·	Monte-Carlo Masters	· 2025 →

Sander Gillé and Joran Vliegen defeated Marcelo Melo and Alexander Zverev in the final, 5–7, 6–3, [10–5] to win the doubles tennis title at the 2024 Monte-Carlo Masters. It was both players' first Masters 1000 title, and they became the first Belgians to win a Masters 1000 doubles title since Xavier Malisse at the 2011 Indian Wells Masters.

Ivan Dodig and Austin Krajicek were the defending champions, but lost to Gillé and Vliegen in the second round.

Matthew Ebden reclaimed the ATP No. 1 doubles ranking from his partner Rohan Bopanna after the pair lost their second round match.

== Seeds ==
The top four seeds received a bye into the second round.

1. (India) Rohan Bopanna / (Australia) Matthew Ebden (second round)
2. (Croatia) Ivan Dodig / (United States) Austin Krajicek (second round)
3. (Spain) Marcel Granollers / (Argentina) Horacio Zeballos (semifinals)
4. (United States) Rajeev Ram / (United Kingdom) Joe Salisbury (second round)
5. (Mexico) Santiago González / (United Kingdom) Neal Skupski (first round)
6. (Germany) Kevin Krawietz / (Germany) Tim Pütz (quarterfinals)
7. (Netherlands) Wesley Koolhof / (Croatia) Nikola Mektić (second round)
8. (Argentina) Máximo González / (Argentina) Andrés Molteni (second round)

== Draw ==
=== Key ===
- Q = Qualifier
- WC = Wild card
- LL = Lucky loser
- Alt = Alternate
- ITF = ITF entry
- PR = Protected ranking
- SR = Special ranking
- SE = Special exempt
- JE = Junior exempt
- JR = Junior Accelerator Programme entrant
- CO = College Accelerator Programme entrant
- NG = Next Gen Accelerator Program entrant
- w/o = Walkover
- r = Retired
- d = Defaulted

=== Finals ===
Semifinals
(El Salvador) Marcelo Arévalo (Croatia) Mate Pavić	7^{7}	5	[7]
Alt	(Brazil) Marcelo Melo (Germany) Alexander Zverev	6^{3}	7	[10]
3	(Spain) Marcel Granollers (Argentina) Horacio Zeballos	5	4
(Belgium) Sander Gillé (Belgium) Joran Vliegen	7	6

Final
Alt	(Brazil) Marcelo Melo (Germany) Alexander Zverev	7	3	[5]
(Belgium) Sander Gillé (Belgium) Joran Vliegen	5	6	[10]

=== Top half ===
First round
(Bulgaria) G Dimitrov (United States) S Korda	4	4
(El Salvador) M Arévalo (Croatia) M Pavić	6	6
WC	(France) A Rinderknech (Monaco) V Vacherot	6^{5}	2
(Italy) S Bolelli (Italy) A Vavassori	7^{7}	6
(Chile) N Jarry (Italy) L Musetti	4	3
8	(Argentina) M González (Argentina) A Molteni	6	6
(Argentina) F Cerúndolo (Argentina) TM Etcheverry	4	6^{3}
Alt	(Brazil) M Melo (Germany) A Zverev	6	7^{7}
(United Kingdom) L Glasspool (Netherlands) J-J Rojer	3	3
(United States) T Fritz (Denmark) H Rune	6	6
(Monaco) H Nys (Poland) J Zieliński	5	7	[7]
7	(Netherlands) W Koolhof (Croatia) N Mektić	7	5	[10]

Second round
1	(India) R Bopanna (Australia) M Ebden	3	6^{6}
(El Salvador) M Arévalo (Croatia) M Pavić	6	7^{8}
(Italy) S Bolelli (Italy) A Vavassori	6	6
8	(Argentina) M González (Argentina) A Molteni	1	3
4	(United States) R Ram (United Kingdom) J Salisbury	3	5
Alt	(Brazil) M Melo (Germany) A Zverev	6	7
(United States) T Fritz (Denmark) H Rune	4	6	[12]
7	(Netherlands) W Koolhof (Croatia) N Mektić	6	3	[10]

Quarterfinals
(El Salvador) M Arévalo (Croatia) M Pavić	6	7^{7}
(Italy) S Bolelli (Italy) A Vavassori	3	6^{4}
Alt	(Brazil) M Melo (Germany) A Zverev	6	7^{7}
(United States) T Fritz (Denmark) H Rune	2	6^{4}

Semifinals
(El Salvador) M Arévalo (Croatia) M Pavić	7^{7}	5	[7]
Alt	(Brazil) M Melo (Germany) A Zverev	6^{3}	7	[10]

=== Bottom half ===
First round
5	(Mexico) S González (United Kingdom) N Skupski	3	6^{7}
(France) N Mahut (France) É Roger-Vasselin	6	7^{9}
WC	(Monaco) R Arneodo (Austria) S Weissborn	7^{7}	7^{7}
PR	(France) U Humbert (France) F Martin	6^{0}	6^{2}
(United Kingdom) J Murray (New Zealand) M Venus	4	4
(United States) N Lammons (United States) J Withrow	6	6
6	(Germany) K Krawietz (Germany) T Pütz	6	6
(Kazakhstan) A Bublik (France) A Mannarino	2	1
D Medvedev; R Safiullin	6^{1}	2
K Khachanov; A Rublev	7^{7}	6
WC	(Italy) J Sinner (Italy) L Sonego	7^{7}	5	[7]
(Belgium) S Gillé (Belgium) J Vliegen	6^{3}	7	[10]

Second round
(France) N Mahut (France) É Roger-Vasselin	6^{5}	6	[10]
WC	(Monaco) R Arneodo (Austria) S Weissborn	7^{7}	2	[5]
(United States) N Lammons (United States) J Withrow	2	4
3	(Spain) M Granollers (Argentina) H Zeballos	6	6
6	(Germany) K Krawietz (Germany) T Pütz	6	6
K Khachanov; A Rublev	4	1
(Belgium) S Gillé (Belgium) J Vliegen	6	6
2	(Croatia) I Dodig (United States) A Krajicek	4	3

Quarterfinals
(France) N Mahut (France) É Roger-Vasselin	4	3
3	(Spain) M Granollers (Argentina) H Zeballos	6	6
6	(Germany) K Krawietz (Germany) T Pütz	5	4
(Belgium) S Gillé (Belgium) J Vliegen	7	6

Semifinals
3	(Spain) M Granollers (Argentina) H Zeballos	5	4
(Belgium) S Gillé (Belgium) J Vliegen	7	6
