= 2024 Barcelona Open Banc Sabadell – Singles =

Singles
- 2024 Barcelona Open Banc Sabadell

Final
- Champion: (Norway) Casper Ruud
- Runner-up: (Greece) Stefanos Tsitsipas
- Score: 7–5, 6–3

Details
- Draw: 48 (6 Q / 4 WC)
- Seeds: 16

Events
Singles	Doubles
- Barcelona Open

Casper Ruud defeated Stefanos Tsitsipas in the final, 7–5, 6–3 to win the singles tennis title at the 2024 Barcelona Open. It was his first ATP 500 title, his eleventh career ATP Tour title, and he did not lose a set en route. It was Tsitsipas' fourth loss in the Barcelona final, after 2018, 2021, and 2023. The final was a rematch of the Monte-Carlo final the week prior, which Tsitsipas had won.

Carlos Alcaraz was the two-time reigning champion, but withdrew due to an ongoing arm injury.

The tournament marked the return of former world No. 1 and 12-time Barcelona champion Rafael Nadal. He was competing in a clay court event for the first time since he won the 2022 French Open, entering the tournament using an injury-protected ranking. He lost to Alex de Minaur in the second round.

For the first time since 1989, no Spanish players reached the quarterfinals of the tournament. This also marked only the fifth time a non-Spanish player won the tournament in the 21st century, after Gastón Gaudio in 2002, Kei Nishikori in 2014 and 2015, and Dominic Thiem in 2019.

== Seeds ==
All seeds receive a bye into the second round.

1. (Spain) Carlos Alcaraz (withdrew)
2. Andrey Rublev (second round)
3. (Norway) Casper Ruud (champion)
4. (Australia) Alex de Minaur (third round)
5. (Greece) Stefanos Tsitsipas (final)
6. (France) Ugo Humbert (second round)
7. Karen Khachanov (withdrew)
8. (Argentina) Sebastián Báez (second round)

9. (Chile) Nicolás Jarry (second round)
10. (Italy) Lorenzo Musetti (second round)
11. (Spain) Alejandro Davidovich Fokina (third round)
12. (United Kingdom) Cameron Norrie (quarterfinals)
13. (Argentina) Tomás Martín Etcheverry (semifinals)
14. (Australia) Jordan Thompson (third round)
15. (Croatia) Borna Ćorić (second round)
16. (France) Arthur Fils (quarterfinals)
17. (Hungary) Fábián Marozsán (third round)

Click on the seed number of a player to go to their draw section.

== Draw ==
Key

- Q = Qualifier
- WC = Wild card
- LL = Lucky loser
- Alt = Alternate
- ITF = ITF entry
- PR = Protected ranking
- SR = Special ranking
- SE = Special exempt
- JE = Junior exempt
- JR = Junior Accelerator Programme entrant
- CO = College Accelerator Programme entrant
- NG = Next Gen Accelerator Program entrant
- w/o = Walkover
- r = Retired
- d = Defaulted

=== Finals ===
Quarterfinals
(Argentina) Facundo Díaz Acosta	6	3	6^{8}
5	(Greece) Stefanos Tsitsipas	4	6	7^{10}
16	(France) Arthur Fils	4	6	2
(Serbia) Dušan Lajović	6	3	6
(Italy) Matteo Arnaldi	4	3
3	(Norway) Casper Ruud	6	6
12	(United Kingdom) Cameron Norrie	6^{4}	6^{1}
13	(Argentina) Tomás Martín Etcheverry	7^{7}	7^{7}

Semifinals
5	(Greece) Stefanos Tsitsipas	5	6	6
(Serbia) Dušan Lajović	7	4	2
3	(Norway) Casper Ruud	7^{8}	6
13	(Argentina) Tomás Martín Etcheverry	6^{6}	4

Final
5	(Greece) Stefanos Tsitsipas	5	3
3	(Norway) Casper Ruud	7	6

=== Top half ===
==== Section 1 ====
First round
(France) L Van Assche	7	6
(China) Z Zhang	5	2
(Argentina) F Díaz Acosta	6	6
WC	(Spain) D Rincón	1	4
LL	(France) H Grenier	2	4
(Spain) R Carballés Baena	6	6
P Kotov	7	3	2
(Austria) S Ofner	5	6	6

Second round
17	(Hungary) F Marozsán	6	3
(France) L Van Assche	0	2^{r}
(Argentina) F Díaz Acosta	6	7
15	(Croatia) B Ćorić	2	5
10	(Italy) L Musetti	6^{4}	4
(Spain) R Carballés Baena	7^{7}	6
(Austria) S Ofner	4	5
5	(Greece) S Tsitsipas	6	7

Third round
17	(Hungary) F Marozsán	6	3	1
(Argentina) F Díaz Acosta	3	6	6
(Spain) R Carballés Baena	5	3
5	(Greece) S Tsitsipas	7	6

Quarterfinals
(Argentina) F Díaz Acosta	6	3	6^{8}
5	(Greece) S Tsitsipas	4	6	7^{10}

==== Section 2 ====
First round
(Italy) F Cobolli	2	3
PR	(Spain) R Nadal	6	6
(Germany) D Altmaier	6	7^{7}
(Australia) A Popyrin	3	6^{4}
(Czech Republic) T Macháč	6	6
Q	(China) J Shang	4	4
Q	(Argentina) D Schwartzman	1	2
(Serbia) D Lajović	6	6

Second round
4	(Australia) A de Minaur	7	6
PR	(Spain) R Nadal	5	1
(Germany) D Altmaier	4	6	1
16	(France) A Fils	6	1	6
11	(Spain) A Davidovich Fokina	w/o
(Czech Republic) T Macháč
(Serbia) D Lajović	6	6
6	(France) U Humbert	4	4

Third round
4	(Australia) A de Minaur	5	2
16	(France) A Fils	7	6
11	(Spain) A Davidovich Fokina	6^{10}	6	1
(Serbia) D Lajović	7^{12}	3	6

Quarterfinals
16	(France) A Fils	4	6	2
(Serbia) D Lajović	6	3	6

=== Bottom half ===
==== Section 3 ====
First round
(Italy) M Arnaldi	5
(France) A Cazaux	5^{r}
Q	(Croatia) D Ajduković	2	6^{3}
Q	(Argentina) M Trungelliti	6	7^{7}
(Spain) J Munar	6	6
(Japan) Y Nishioka	3	1
(France) A Müller	7^{7}	6
WC	(Spain) A Ramos Viñolas	6^{4}	0

Second round
8	(Argentina) S Báez	7	6^{8}	2
(Italy) M Arnaldi	5	7^{10}	6
Q	(Argentina) M Trungelliti	7^{7}	6
9	(Chile) N Jarry	6^{5}	3
14	(Australia) J Thompson	6	2	6
(Spain) J Munar	4	6	4
(France) A Müller	3	4
3	(Norway) C Ruud	6	6

Third round
(Italy) M Arnaldi	6	6
Q	(Argentina) M Trungelliti	3	0
14	(Australia) J Thompson	1	4
3	(Norway) C Ruud	6	6

Quarterfinals
(Italy) M Arnaldi	4	3
3	(Norway) C Ruud	6	6

==== Section 4 ====
First round
R Safiullin	3	6^{8}
WC	(Spain) R Bautista Agut	6	7^{10}
Q	(France) H Mayot	7^{7}	2	6
(Argentina) P Cachín	6^{5}	6	3
Q	(Dominican Republic) N Hardt	2	6	6
WC	(Spain) M Landaluce	6	4	3
(United Kingdom) D Evans	6^{5}	2
(United States) B Nakashima	7^{7}	6

Second round
LL	(Italy) A Vavassori	6	3	1
WC	(Spain) R Bautista Agut	4	6	6
Q	(France) H Mayot	6^{3}	7^{8}	0^{r}
12	(United Kingdom) C Norrie	7^{7}	6^{6}	0
13	(Argentina) TM Etcheverry	7	6
Q	(Dominican Republic) N Hardt	5	2
(United States) B Nakashima	6	7^{8}
2	A Rublev	4	6^{6}

Third round
WC	(Spain) R Bautista Agut	4	3
12	(United Kingdom) C Norrie	6	6
13	(Argentina) TM Etcheverry	3	7^{7}	6
(United States) B Nakashima	6	6^{5}	4

Quarterfinals
12	(United Kingdom) C Norrie	6^{4}	6^{1}
13	(Argentina) TM Etcheverry	7^{7}	7^{7}

== Qualifying ==
=== Seeds ===
1. (China) Shang Juncheng (qualified)
2. (Croatia) Duje Ajduković (qualified)
3. (France) Harold Mayot (qualified)
4. (Argentina) Diego Schwartzman (qualified)
5. (Argentina) Facundo Bagnis (first round)
6. (Spain) Bernabé Zapata Miralles (first round)
7. (Spain) Pablo Llamas Ruiz (first round)
8. (France) Pierre-Hugues Herbert (first round)
9. (Italy) Andrea Vavassori (qualifying competition, lucky loser)
10. (Germany) Benjamin Hassan (first round)
11. (France) Hugo Grenier (qualifying competition, lucky loser)
12. (Bolivia) Hugo Dellien (qualifying competition)

=== Qualifiers ===
1. (China) Shang Juncheng
2. (Croatia) Duje Ajduković
3. (France) Harold Mayot
4. (Argentina) Diego Schwartzman
5. (Dominican Republic) Nick Hardt
6. (Argentina) Marco Trungelliti

=== Lucky losers ===
1. (France) Hugo Grenier
2. (Italy) Andrea Vavassori

=== Qualifying draw ===
==== First qualifier ====
First round
1	(China) Shang Juncheng	6	6
(Jordan) Abdullah Shelbayh	2	1
WC	(Spain) Nicolás Álvarez Varona	6^{6}	2
11	(France) Hugo Grenier	7^{8}	6

Qualifying competition
1	(China) Shang Juncheng	6	6
11	(France) Hugo Grenier	4	4

==== Second qualifier ====
First round
2	(Croatia) Duje Ajduković	6^{7}	6	6
WC	(Spain) Max Alcalá Gurri	7^{9}	2	0
(Spain) Oriol Roca Batalla	6	6
8	(France) Pierre-Hugues Herbert	4	1

Qualifying competition
2	(Croatia) Duje Ajduković	6	6
(Spain) Oriol Roca Batalla	4	4

==== Third qualifier ====
First round
3	(France) Harold Mayot	6^{2}	6	6
(Spain) Nikolás Sánchez Izquierdo	7^{7}	2	3
WC	(Spain) David Jordà Sanchis	4	6^{4}
9	(Italy) Andrea Vavassori	6	7^{7}

Qualifying competition
3	(France) Harold Mayot	6	6
9	(Italy) Andrea Vavassori	4	3

==== Fourth qualifier ====
First round
4	(Argentina) Diego Schwartzman	7	6
WC	(Spain) Pol Martín Tiffon	5	1
(Kazakhstan) Denis Yevseyev	6	3	6
10	(Germany) Benjamin Hassan	2	6	3

Qualifying competition
4	(Argentina) Diego Schwartzman	6	6
(Kazakhstan) Denis Yevseyev	2	0

==== Fifth qualifier ====
First round
5	(Argentina) Facundo Bagnis	4	6	3
Alt	(Dominican Republic) Nick Hardt	6	2	6
(France) Matteo Martineau	2	6	1
12	(Bolivia) Hugo Dellien	6	3	6

Qualifying competition
Alt	(Dominican Republic) Nick Hardt	4	7^{7}	6
12	(Bolivia) Hugo Dellien	6	6^{0}	3

==== Sixth qualifier ====
First round
6	(Spain) Bernabé Zapata Miralles	2	1
(Italy) Gianluca Mager	6	6
(Argentina) Marco Trungelliti	6	5	6
7	(Spain) Pablo Llamas Ruiz	3	7	4

Qualifying competition
(Italy) Gianluca Mager	3	1
(Argentina) Marco Trungelliti	6	6
