= 2024 Abierto Mexicano Telcel – Singles =

Singles
- 2024 Abierto Mexicano Telcel

Final
- Champion: (Australia) Alex de Minaur
- Runner-up: (Norway) Casper Ruud
- Score: 6–4, 6–4

Details
- Draw: 32 (4 Q / 3 WC )
- Seeds: 8

Events
Singles	Doubles
- Mexican Open

Defending champion Alex de Minaur defeated Casper Ruud in the final, 6–4, 6–4 to win the singles tennis title the 2024 Mexican Open. It was his eighth ATP Tour career singles title. De Minaur became the first player to defend the title since David Ferrer in 2012, and the first to do so since the tournament's switch to hardcourts in 2014.

== Seeds ==
1. (Germany) Alexander Zverev (first round)
2. (Denmark) Holger Rune (semifinals)
3. (Australia) Alex de Minaur (champion)
4. (United States) Taylor Fritz (first round)
5. (Greece) Stefanos Tsitsipas (quarterfinals)
6. (Norway) Casper Ruud (final)
7. (United States) Tommy Paul (first round)
8. (United States) Frances Tiafoe (second round)

== Draw ==
Key

- Q = Qualifier
- WC = Wild card
- LL = Lucky loser
- Alt = Alternate
- ITF = ITF entry
- PR = Protected ranking
- SR = Special ranking
- SE = Special exempt
- JE = Junior exempt
- JR = Junior Accelerator Programme entrant
- CO = College Accelerator Programme entrant
- NG = Next Gen Accelerator Program entrant
- w/o = Walkover
- r = Retired
- d = Defaulted

=== Finals ===
Semifinals
(United Kingdom) Jack Draper	3	6	0^{r}
3	(Australia) Alex de Minaur	6	2	4
6	(Norway) Casper Ruud	3	6	6
2	(Denmark) Holger Rune	6	3	4

Final
3	(Australia) Alex de Minaur	6	6
6	(Norway) Casper Ruud	4	4

=== Top half ===
First round
1	(Germany) A Zverev	3	6	3
(Germany) D Altmaier	6	3	6
(Serbia) M Kecmanović	4	6	6
WC	(Argentina) D Schwartzman	6	3	1
(Portugal) N Borges	6	2	4
LL	(Japan) Y Nishioka	3	6	6
(United Kingdom) J Draper	6	6
7	(United States) T Paul	0	4
3	(Australia) A de Minaur	6	6
(Japan) T Daniel	2	1
WC	(Mexico) E Escobedo	7^{9}	4	6^{4}
(Austria) S Ofner	6^{7}	6	7^{7}
(Canada) F Auger-Aliassime	6	3	2
Q	(Italy) F Cobolli	2	6	6
R Safiullin	3	4
5	(Greece) S Tsitsipas	6	6

Second round
(Germany) D Altmaier	4	4
(Serbia) M Kecmanović	6	6
LL	(Japan) Y Nishioka	3	0
(United Kingdom) J Draper	6	6
3	(Australia) A de Minaur	6	6
(Austria) S Ofner	1	3
Q	(Italy) F Cobolli	3	6^{6}
5	(Greece) S Tsitsipas	6	7^{8}

Quarterfinals
(Serbia) M Kecmanović	2	2
(United Kingdom) J Draper	6	6
3	(Australia) A de Minaur	1	6	6
5	(Greece) S Tsitsipas	6	3	3

Semifinals
(United Kingdom) J Draper	3	6	0^{r}
3	(Australia) A de Minaur	6	2	4

=== Bottom half ===
First round
6	(Norway) C Ruud	6	6^{5}	6
(United States) C Eubanks	4	7^{7}	3
WC	(Mexico) R Pacheco Méndez	2	2
(Serbia) D Lajović	6	6
(United Kingdom) D Evans	6	5	6^{5}
(United States) B Shelton	2	7	7^{7}
(Italy) M Arnaldi	6	4	6
4	(United States) T Fritz	4	6	3
8	(United States) F Tiafoe	4	6	6
(Australia) M Purcell	6	3	0
Q	(France) T Atmane	4	6	0
(Germany) D Koepfer	6	4	6
Q	(United States) A Kovacevic	6	5	6
(Australia) J Thompson	3	7	4
Q	(United States) M Mmoh	2	3
2	(Denmark) H Rune	6	6

Second round
6	(Norway) C Ruud	6	7
(Serbia) D Lajović	4	5
(United States) B Shelton	7^{7}	3	6
(Italy) M Arnaldi	6^{1}	6	3
8	(United States) F Tiafoe	4	7	1
(Germany) D Koepfer	6	5	6
Q	(United States) A Kovacevic	6^{5}	2
2	(Denmark) H Rune	7^{7}	6

Quarterfinals
6	(Norway) C Ruud	6^{7}	6	6
(United States) B Shelton	7^{9}	4	4
(Germany) D Koepfer	6^{2}	6^{0}
2	(Denmark) H Rune	7^{7}	7^{7}

Semifinals
6	(Norway) C Ruud	3	6	6
2	(Denmark) H Rune	6	3	4

== Qualifying ==
=== Seeds ===
1. (Italy) Flavio Cobolli (qualified)
2. (Australia) Aleksandar Vukic (first round)
3. (Australia) Rinky Hijikata (qualifying competition)
4. (Japan) Yoshihito Nishioka (qualifying competition, lucky loser)
5. (Australia) James Duckworth (first round, retired)
6. (United States) Aleksandar Kovacevic (qualified)
7. (Australia) Thanasi Kokkinakis (first round, retired)
8. (France) Constant Lestienne (qualifying competition)

=== Qualifiers ===
1. (Italy) Flavio Cobolli
2. (France) Térence Atmane
3. (United States) Aleksandar Kovacevic
4. (United States) Michael Mmoh

=== Lucky loser ===
1. (Japan) Yoshihito Nishioka

=== Qualifying draw ===
==== First qualifier ====
First round
1	(Italy) Flavio Cobolli	6	0	7
Alt	(United States) Brandon Holt	3	6	5
(United Kingdom) Liam Broady	4	4
8	(France) Constant Lestienne	6	6

Qualifying competition
1	(Italy) Flavio Cobolli	7	3	6
8	(France) Constant Lestienne	5	6	0

==== Second qualifier ====
First round
2	(Australia) Aleksandar Vukic	4	3
(France) Térence Atmane	6	6
WC	(United States) Zachary Svajda	6	1
5	(Australia) James Duckworth	3	1^{r}

Qualifying competition
(France) Térence Atmane	1	6	6
WC	(United States) Zachary Svajda	6	3	3

==== Third qualifier ====
First round
3	(Australia) Rinky Hijikata	6	2	6
(Japan) Shintaro Mochizuki	4	6	4
WC	(Colombia) Nicolás Mejía	4	6	2
6	(United States) Aleksandar Kovacevic	6	4	6

Qualifying competition
3	(Australia) Rinky Hijikata	6	2	6^{4}
6	(United States) Aleksandar Kovacevic	4	6	7^{7}

==== Fourth qualifier ====
First round
4	(Japan) Yoshihito Nishioka	6	6
WC	(Mexico) Alan Fernando Rubio Fierros	2	1
(United States) Michael Mmoh	4
7	(Australia) Thanasi Kokkinakis	1^{r}

Qualifying competition
4	(Japan) Yoshihito Nishioka	2	6	0
(United States) Michael Mmoh	6	1	6
