= 2024 Mutua Madrid Open – Men's doubles =

Men's doubles
- 2024 Mutua Madrid Open

Final
- Champions: (United States) Sebastian Korda (Australia) Jordan Thompson
- Runners-up: (Uruguay) Ariel Behar (Czech Republic) Adam Pavlásek
- Score: 6–3, 7–6^{(9–7)}

Events
| Singles | men | women |
| Doubles | men | women |
- Mutua Madrid Open

Sebastian Korda and Jordan Thompson defeated Ariel Behar and Adam Pavlásek in the final, 6–3, 7–6^{(9–7)} to win the men's doubles tennis title at the 2024 Madrid Open. It was the first ATP Masters 1000 doubles title for both players, Korda's first career ATP Tour doubles title and Thompson's sixth.

Karen Khachanov and Andrey Rublev were the reigning champions, but chose not to compete this year.

The pair of Marcel Granollers and Horacio Zeballos attained the ATP No. 1 doubles ranking for the first time after reaching the semifinals. Zeballos became the first Argentine man to achieve a world No. 1 ranking. Matthew Ebden, Rajeev Ram and Joe Salisbury, were also in contention for the top ranking at the beginning of the tournament.

The tournament was used by the ATP for the trial of new doubles rules, including a shorter serve clock and the reservation of slots for doubles teams to enter tournaments using their singles rankings. The event featured sixteen seeded teams instead of eight, accepted as advanced doubles-only entries, and started play on the second Tuesday of the tournament.

== Seeds ==
1. (India) Rohan Bopanna / (Australia) Matthew Ebden (first round)
2. (Spain) Marcel Granollers / (Argentina) Horacio Zeballos (semifinals, withdrew)
3. (United Kingdom) Joe Salisbury / (United Kingdom) Neal Skupski (second round)
4. (Croatia) Ivan Dodig / (United States) Austin Krajicek (first round)
5. (Mexico) Santiago González / (France) Édouard Roger-Vasselin (first round)
6. (Germany) Kevin Krawietz / (Germany) Tim Pütz (second round)
7. (Monaco) Hugo Nys / (Poland) Jan Zieliński (quarterfinals)
8. (Brazil) Marcelo Melo / (United States) Rajeev Ram (first round)
9. (Belgium) Sander Gillé / (Belgium) Joran Vliegen (second round)
10. (El Salvador) Marcelo Arévalo / (Croatia) Mate Pavić (first round)
11. (United Kingdom) Jamie Murray / (New Zealand) Michael Venus (semifinals)
12. (Italy) Simone Bolelli / (Italy) Andrea Vavassori (quarterfinals)
13. (Argentina) Andrés Molteni / (Australia) John Peers (second round)
14. (United Kingdom) Lloyd Glasspool / (Netherlands) Jean-Julien Rojer (second round)
15. (United States) Nathaniel Lammons / (United States) Jackson Withrow (quarterfinals)
16. (France) Sadio Doumbia / (France) Fabien Reboul (quarterfinals)

== Draw ==
Key

- Q = Qualifier
- WC = Wild card
- LL = Lucky loser
- Alt = Alternate
- ITF = ITF entry
- PR = Protected ranking
- SR = Special ranking
- SE = Special exempt
- JE = Junior exempt
- JR = Junior Accelerator Programme entrant
- CO = College Accelerator Programme entrant
- NG = Next Gen Accelerator Program entrant
- w/o = Walkover
- r = Retired
- d = Defaulted

=== Finals ===
Semifinals
(United States) Sebastian Korda (Australia) Jordan Thompson | 3 | 6 | [10]
11 | (United Kingdom) Jamie Murray (New Zealand) Michael Venus | 6 | 3 | [8]
(Uruguay) Ariel Behar (Czech Republic) Adam Pavlásek | w/o
2 | (Spain) Marcel Granollers (Argentina) Horacio Zeballos

Final
(United States) Sebastian Korda (Australia) Jordan Thompson | 6 | 7^{9}
(Uruguay) Ariel Behar (Czech Republic) Adam Pavlásek | 3 | 6^{7}

=== Top half ===
First round
1 | (India) R Bopanna (Australia) M Ebden | 6^{4} | 5
(United States) S Korda (Australia) J Thompson | 7^{7} | 7
(Colombia) N Barrientos (Germany) A Mies | 3 | 7^{8} | [5]
13 | (Argentina) A Molteni (Australia) J Peers | 6 | 6^{6} | [10]
12 | (Italy) S Bolelli (Italy) A Vavassori | 6 | 7^{7}
D Medvedev (United States) T Paul | 2 | 6^{5}
A Karatsev (China) Z Zhang | 4 | 7 | [10]
5 | (Mexico) S González (France) É Roger-Vasselin | 6 | 5 | [3]
4 | (Croatia) I Dodig (United States) A Krajicek | 2 | 6^{6}
(Germany) B Hassan (Jordan) A Shelbayh | 6 | 7^{8}
PR | (Kazakhstan) A Bublik (Canada) D Shapovalov | 3 | 2
11 | (United Kingdom) J Murray (New Zealand) M Venus | 6 | 6
16 | (France) S Doumbia (France) F Reboul | 6 | 6
(Italy) F Cobolli (Brazil) T Monteiro | 2 | 3
WC | (Ecuador) G Escobar (Kazakhstan) A Nedovyesov | 4 | 6 | [10]
8 | (Brazil) M Melo (United States) R Ram | 6 | 3 | [8]

Second round
(United States) S Korda (Australia) J Thompson | 6 | 6
13 | (Argentina) A Molteni (Australia) J Peers | 4 | 4
12 | (Italy) S Bolelli (Italy) A Vavassori | 6 | 6
A Karatsev (China) Z Zhang | 4 | 2
(Germany) B Hassan (Jordan) A Shelbayh | 3 | 6^{4}
11 | (United Kingdom) J Murray (New Zealand) M Venus | 6 | 7^{7}
16 | (France) S Doumbia (France) F Reboul | 6 | 3 | [10]
WC | (Ecuador) G Escobar (Kazakhstan) A Nedovyesov | 3 | 6 | [5]

Quarterfinals
(United States) S Korda (Australia) J Thompson | 7^{7} | 6
12 | (Italy) S Bolelli (Italy) A Vavassori | 6^{5} | 4
11 | (United Kingdom) J Murray (New Zealand) M Venus | 0 | 6 | [10]
16 | (France) S Doumbia (France) F Reboul | 6 | 4 | [2]

Semifinals
(United States) S Korda (Australia) J Thompson | 3 | 6 | [10]
11 | (United Kingdom) J Murray (New Zealand) M Venus | 6 | 3 | [8]

=== Bottom half ===
First round
6 | (Germany) K Krawietz (Germany) T Pütz | 6 | 6
PR | (Netherlands) R Haase (France) F Martin | 2 | 2
(Argentina) P Cachín; P Kotov | 4 | 4
15 | (United States) N Lammons (United States) J Withrow | 6 | 6
10 | (El Salvador) M Arévalo (Croatia) M Pavić | 6 | 2 | [10]
(Uruguay) A Behar (Czech Republic) A Pavlásek | 4 | 6 | [12]
WC | (France) N Mahut (France) A Olivetti | 4 | 4
3 | (United Kingdom) J Salisbury (United Kingdom) N Skupski | 6 | 6
7 | (Monaco) H Nys (Poland) J Zieliński | 6 | 6
Alt | (Ukraine) D Molchanov (Australia) J-P Smith | 3 | 4
(Australia) A de Minaur (Australia) A Popyrin | 4 | 7^{12} | [9]
14 | (United Kingdom) L Glasspool (Netherlands) J-J Rojer | 6 | 6^{10} | [11]
9 | (Belgium) S Gillé (Belgium) J Vliegen | 7^{7} | 6
WC | (Greece) Pe Tsitsipas (Greece) S Tsitsipas | 6^{3} | 1
(Netherlands) T Griekspoor (Netherlands) W Koolhof | 3 | 6^{6}
2 | (Spain) M Granollers (Argentina) H Zeballos | 6 | 7^{8}

Second round
6 | (Germany) K Krawietz (Germany) T Pütz | 5 | 4
15 | (United States) N Lammons (United States) J Withrow | 7 | 6
(Uruguay) A Behar (Czech Republic) A Pavlásek | 6 | 3 | [12]
3 | (United Kingdom) J Salisbury (United Kingdom) N Skupski | 4 | 6 | [10]
7 | (Monaco) H Nys (Poland) J Zieliński | 6 | 7^{7}
14 | (United Kingdom) L Glasspool (Netherlands) J-J Rojer | 3 | 6^{4}
9 | (Belgium) S Gillé (Belgium) J Vliegen | 7^{7} | 5 | [10]
2 | (Spain) M Granollers (Argentina) H Zeballos | 6^{3} | 7 | [12]

Quarterfinals
15 | (United States) N Lammons (United States) J Withrow | 3 | 6 | [6]
(Uruguay) A Behar (Czech Republic) A Pavlásek | 6 | 4 | [10]
7 | (Monaco) H Nys (Poland) J Zieliński | 6 | 2 | [14]
2 | (Spain) M Granollers (Argentina) H Zeballos | 4 | 6 | [16]

Semifinals
(Uruguay) A Behar (Czech Republic) A Pavlásek | w/o
2 | (Spain) M Granollers (Argentina) H Zeballos

== Seeded teams ==
The following are the seeded teams. Seedings are based on ATP rankings as of 22 April 2024.

| Country | Player | Country | Player | Rank | Seed |
|---|---|---|---|---|---|
| IND | Rohan Bopanna | AUS | Matthew Ebden | 3 | 1 |
| ESP | Marcel Granollers | ARG | Horacio Zeballos | 6 | 2 |
| GBR | Joe Salisbury | GBR | Neal Skupski | 16 | 3 |
| CRO | Ivan Dodig | USA | Austin Krajicek | 17 | 4 |
| MEX | Santiago González | FRA | Édouard Roger-Vasselin | 23 | 5 |
| GER | Kevin Krawietz | GER | Tim Pütz | 26 | 6 |
| MON | Hugo Nys | POL | Jan Zieliński | 37 | 7 |
| BRA | Marcelo Melo | USA | Rajeev Ram | 39 | 8 |
| BEL | Sander Gillé | BEL | Joran Vliegen | 42 | 9 |
| ESA | Marcelo Arévalo | CRO | Mate Pavić | 45 | 10 |
| GBR | Jamie Murray | NZL | Michael Venus | 51 | 11 |
| ITA | Simone Bolelli | ITA | Andrea Vavassori | 52 | 12 |
| ARG | Andrés Molteni | AUS | John Peers | 53 | 13 |
| GBR | Lloyd Glasspool | NED | Jean-Julien Rojer | 55 | 14 |
| USA | Nathaniel Lammons | USA | Jackson Withrow | 56 | 15 |
| FRA | Sadio Doumbia | FRA | Fabien Reboul | 65 | 16 |

== Other entry information ==
=== Wildcards ===
- (Ecuador) Gonzalo Escobar / (Kazakhstan) Aleksandr Nedovyesov
- (France) Nicolas Mahut / (France) Albano Olivetti
- (Greece) Petros Tsitsipas / (Greece) Stefanos Tsitsipas

=== Protected ranking ===
- (Kazakhstan) Alexander Bublik / (Canada) Denis Shapovalov
- (Netherlands) Robin Haase / (France) Fabrice Martin

=== Alternates ===
- (Ukraine) Denys Molchanov / (Australia) John-Patrick Smith

=== Withdrawals ===
- (United States) Taylor Fritz / (United States) Ben Shelton → replaced by (Ukraine) Denys Molchanov / (Australia) John-Patrick Smith
- (Argentina) Máximo González / (Argentina) Andrés Molteni → replaced by (Argentina) Andrés Molteni / (Australia) John Peers
- (Netherlands) Wesley Koolhof / (Croatia) Nikola Mektić → replaced by (France) Sadio Doumbia / (France) Fabien Reboul
