= 2024 Barcelona Open Banc Sabadell – Doubles =

Doubles
- 2024 Barcelona Open Banc Sabadell

Final
- Champions: (Argentina) Máximo González (Argentina) Andrés Molteni
- Runners-up: (Monaco) Hugo Nys (Poland) Jan Zieliński
- Score: 4–6, 6–4, [11–9]

Events
Singles	Doubles
← 2023 ·	Barcelona Open Banc Sabadell	· 2025 →

Defending champions Máximo González and Andrés Molteni defeated Hugo Nys and Jan Zieliński in the final, 4–6, 6–4, [11–9] to win the doubles tennis title at the 2024 Barcelona Open.

== Seeds ==
1. (Spain) Marcel Granollers / (Argentina) Horacio Zeballos (quarterfinals)
2. (Croatia) Ivan Dodig / (United Kingdom) Neal Skupski (quarterfinals)
3. (United States) Rajeev Ram / (United Kingdom) Joe Salisbury (first round)
4. (Mexico) Santiago González / (France) Édouard Roger-Vasselin (quarterfinals)

== Draw ==
Key

- Q = Qualifier
- WC = Wild card
- LL = Lucky loser
- Alt = Alternate
- ITF = ITF entry
- PR = Protected ranking
- SR = Special ranking
- SE = Special exempt
- JE = Junior exempt
- JR = Junior Accelerator Programme entrant
- CO = College Accelerator Programme entrant
- NG = Next Gen Accelerator Program entrant
- w/o = Walkover
- r = Retired
- d = Defaulted

=== Draw ===
First round
1	(Spain) M Granollers (Argentina) H Zeballos	6	5	[10]
WC	(Spain) D Rincón (Spain) O Roca Batalla	3	7	[5]
WC	(Spain) R Carballés Baena (Spain) J Munar	4	4
Q	(Czech Republic) T Macháč (China) Z Zhang	6	6
4	(Mexico) S González (France) É Roger-Vasselin	6	7
(Australia) A de Minaur (Australia) J Thompson	2	5
(Argentina) S Báez (Argentina) TM Etcheverry	1	3
(Monaco) H Nys (Poland) J Zieliński	6	6
(Argentina) M González (Argentina) A Molteni	6	7
(Italy) S Bolelli (Italy) A Vavassori	2	5
(Netherlands) W Koolhof (Croatia) N Mektić	7	6
3	(United States) R Ram (United Kingdom) J Salisbury	5	4
(Netherlands) R Haase (Greece) S Tsitsipas	2	4
(El Salvador) M Arévalo (Croatia) M Pavić	6	6
(United Kingdom) J Murray (New Zealand) M Venus	4	6^{4}
2	(Croatia) I Dodig (United Kingdom) N Skupski	6	7^{7}

Quarterfinals
1	(Spain) M Granollers (Argentina) H Zeballos	6^{7}	6	[5]
Q	(Czech Republic) T Macháč (China) Z Zhang	7^{9}	4	[10]
4	(Mexico) S González (France) É Roger-Vasselin	3	6	[3]
(Monaco) H Nys (Poland) J Zieliński	6	3	[10]
(Argentina) M González (Argentina) A Molteni	6	7^{7}
(Netherlands) W Koolhof (Croatia) N Mektić	3	6^{1}
(El Salvador) M Arévalo (Croatia) M Pavić	6	7^{7}
2	(Croatia) I Dodig (United Kingdom) N Skupski	2	6^{4}

Semifinals
Q	(Czech Republic) T Macháč (China) Z Zhang	6	6^{3}	[4]
(Monaco) H Nys (Poland) J Zieliński	4	7^{7}	[10]
(Argentina) M González (Argentina) A Molteni	3	6	[11]
(El Salvador) M Arévalo (Croatia) M Pavić	6	3	[9]

Final
(Monaco) H Nys (Poland) J Zieliński	6	4	[9]
(Argentina) M González (Argentina) A Molteni	4	6	[11]

== Qualifying ==
=== Seeds ===
1. (Ecuador) Diego Hidalgo / (Colombia) Cristian Rodríguez (qualifying competition)
2. (Czech Republic) Tomáš Macháč / (China) Zhang Zhizhen (qualified)

=== Qualifiers ===
1. (Czech Republic) Tomáš Macháč / (China) Zhang Zhizhen

=== Qualifying draw ===
First round
1	(Ecuador) Diego Hidalgo (Colombia) Cristian Rodríguez	6	6
(France) Arthur Fils (France) Luca Van Assche	2	1
WC	(Spain) David Jordà Sanchis (Spain) Pablo Llamas Ruiz	3	0
2	(Czech Republic) Tomáš Macháč (China) Zhang Zhizhen	6	6

Qualifying competition
1	(Ecuador) Diego Hidalgo (Colombia) Cristian Rodríguez	4	2
2	(Czech Republic) Tomáš Macháč (China) Zhang Zhizhen	6	6
