= 2024 Jannik Sinner tennis season =

Tennis player season

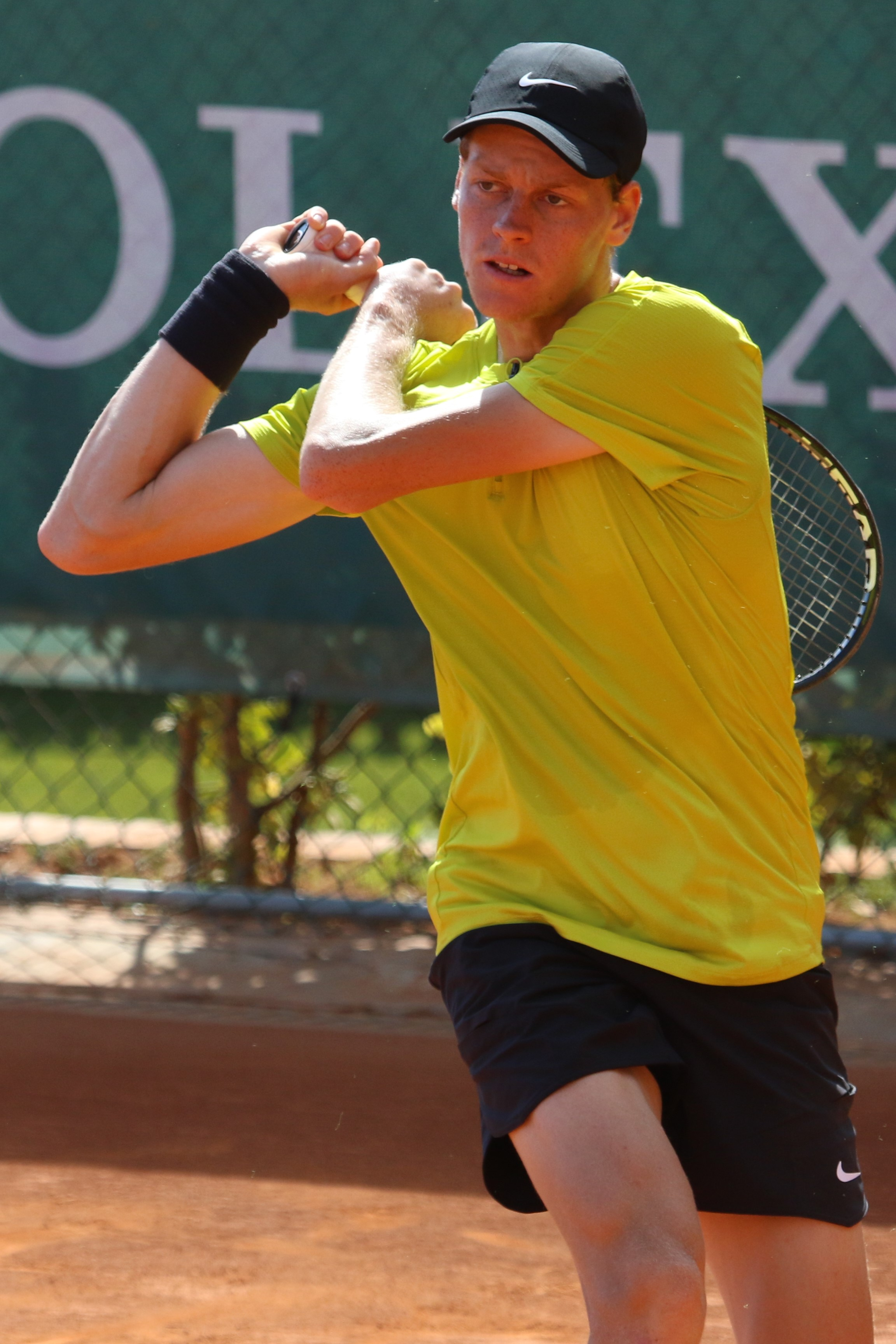
- Sinner at the 2023 Monte-Carlo Masters
- Full name: Jannik Sinner
- Country: Italy
- Calendar prize money: $19,735,703

Singles
- Season record: 73–6 (92.4%)
- Calendar titles: 8
- Year-end ranking: No. 1
- Ranking change from previous year: ▲3

Grand Slam & significant results
- Australian Open: W
- French Open: SF
- Wimbledon: QF
- US Open: W
- Other tournaments
- Tour Finals: W
- Olympic Games: N/A

Doubles
- Season record: 5–3 (62.5%)
- Current ranking: No. 334
- Ranking change from previous year: ▲161

Davis Cup
- Davis Cup: W

Injuries
- Injuries: hip injury

The 2024 Jannik Sinner tennis season officially began on 14 January 2024, with the start of the Australian Open in Melbourne. The season saw Jannik Sinner clinch the world number 1 after winning his first Grand Slam title at the Australian Open.

== Yearly summary ==
=== Early hard court season ===
Sinner started his year at the Australian Open, where he beat Botic van de Zandschulp, Jesper de Jong, Sebastián Báez, Karen Khachanov and Andrey Rublev (all in straight sets) to reach his second Grand Slam semifinal and first at the Australian Open. In the semifinals, he upset world No. 1 and defending champion Novak Djokovic to advance to his first major final, becoming the first player not to face a break point against Djokovic in a completed major match. His victory over the world No. 1 was Djokovic's first defeat at the Australian Open since 2018. He became the first Italian player to reach the singles final at this major and the third man, after Adriano Panatta at the 1976 French Open and Matteo Berrettini at the 2021 Wimbledon Championships, to reach a major final in the Open Era. In the final, he came from a two-set deficit to beat Daniil Medvedev to become the first Italian player, male or female, to win the Australian Open singles title, and the third man to win a Major (the second of which is in the Open Era), the first in 48 years. His victory over Medvedev meant he became the second player to win the Australian Open after losing the first two sets in the final, after Rafael Nadal, who also beat Medvedev in 2022.

As the top seed at the Rotterdam Open, he recorded his 200th win in the quarterfinals, after Milos Raonic retired with a hip injury with Sinner leading by a set, becoming the first player born in the 2000s to accomplish this feat. After defeating Tallon Griekspoor in the semifinal and Alex de Minaur in the final, Sinner rose to a new career high of No. 3 in the world, becoming the highest-ranked Italian player in history. Sinner also became the first male player since Lleyton Hewitt, in 2001, to win his debut event as Grand Slam champion. At the 2024 BNP Paribas Open, with a victory over 25th seed Jan-Lennard Struff to reach the fourth round, he recorded his 17th consecutive match win, the longest ATP level streak for an Italian player in the Open Era. Sinner extended this to 19 consecutive wins (16–0 in 2024) by defeating Jiří Lehečka in the quarter-final. Prior to his semifinal defeat to Carlos Alcaraz, Sinner had won 36 of his past 38 matches, dating back to the 2023 China Open.

At the 2024 Miami Open, Sinner defeated Grigor Dimitrov in the final to win his second Master's 1000 title; as a result, he climbed to a career high (and Italian record) ranking of No. 2 in the world. Sinner improved his 2024 ATP match record to 22–1.

=== Clay court season ===
Sinner's clay season saw just his second defeat of the season, to Stefanos Tsitsipas at the Monte-Carlo Masters, in April. In May, Sinner withdrew from the Madrid Masters, at the quarterfinal stage, due to a hip injury. Three days later, Sinner withdrew from the Italian Open due to the same injury.

Following Novak Djokovic's withdrawal from the 2024 French Open on 4 June, Sinner became World No.1 for the first time on 10 June 2024, following the conclusion of the tournament, despite losing in the semifinal to Alcaraz in five sets. Sinner became the first Italian player (male or female) to hold the top position in the rankings.

=== Grass court season ===
At the 2024 Halle Open, Sinner defeated Tallon Griekspoor, Fábián Marozsán, Jan-Lennard Struff, Zhang Zhizhen and Hubert Hurkacz to win his debut tournament as World No. 1, becoming just the eighth male player to achieve this feat. Sinner improved his 2024 match record to 38–3.

At the 2024 Wimbledon Championships, Sinner entered as the top seed in a Grand Slam for the first time. He defeated Yannik Hanfmann in the first round, but lost to Medvedev in the quarterfinals, after a medical timeout for illness during the third set.

=== Summer hardcourt season ===
On 24 July 2024, Sinner announced he would not participate in the 2024 Summer Olympics, due to tonsillitis.

Sinner won the 2024 Cincinnati Open, defeating Frances Tiafoe in the championship in straight sets. He also overcame Alex Michelsen, Andrey Rublev, and Alexander Zverev en route to his victory. This marks his second 1000 masters title in the 2024 season and fifth title overall.

On 20 August, it was announced that Sinner received an anti-doping sanction and was stripped of his money and points from the Indian Wells tournament in March, due to testing positive for Clostebol, a banned anabolic steroid, but one that is legal and readily available over the counter in Italy. The International Tennis Integrity Agency found that Sinner's physiotherapist, Giacomo Naldi, had used a spray containing Clostebol to treat a cut on his own finger, then proceeded to administer massages to Sinner's legs and feet without gloves, enabling trace amounts of Clostebol (in picograms - less than one-billionth of a gram) to enter Sinner's system. Sinner did not face further sanction after the ITIA found "no fault or negligence" on his part.

Sinner won his second major at the 2024 US Open, defeating 5th seed Daniil Medvedev in the quarterfinals, getting revenge for the previous Wimbledon loss, 25th seed Jack Draper in the semifinals, and 12th seed Taylor Fritz in the final. He became the fourth man in more than 50 years to win his first two major titles in the same season. At the post-match ceremony, Sinner dedicated his win to his aunt. "This title means so much to me and my career. It hasn't been an easy period. My team supported me every single day. I love tennis, and I train hard for moments like this. Beyond the court, there's a life and I want to dedicate this title to my aunt, who is not feeling well health wise. I don't know how much longer she'll be with me in my life," said Sinner, adding that his aunt has been a very important person in his life.

At age 23, Sinner became the youngest man ever to win both hard-court majors in the same year. With his win and Aryna Sabalenka's win in the women's championships, it is the first time that the same man and the same woman won both hard-court majors in the same year (2024) since 1988.

== All matches ==
This table chronicles all the matches of Jannik Sinner in 2024.

Key
W	F	SF	QF	#R	RR	Q#	P#	DNQ	A	Z#	PO	G	S	B	NMS	NTI	P	NH

(W) winner; (F) finalist; (SF) semifinalist; (QF) quarterfinalist; (#R) rounds 4, 3, 2, 1; (RR) round-robin stage; (Q#) qualification round; (P#) preliminary round; (DNQ) did not qualify; (A) absent; (Z#) Davis/Fed Cup Zonal Group (with number indication) or (PO) play-off; (G) gold, (S) silver or (B) bronze Olympic/Paralympic medal; (NMS) not a Masters tournament; (NTI) not a Tier I tournament; (P) postponed; (NH) not held; (SR) strike rate (events won / competed); (W–L) win–loss record.
To avoid confusion and double counting, these charts are updated at the conclusion of a tournament or when the player's participation has ended.

=== Singles matches ===
Tournament	Match	Round	Opponent (seed or key)	Rank	Result	Score
Australian Open; Melbourne, Australia; Grand Slam tournament Hard, outdoor 14 – 28 January 2024
Australian Open; Melbourne, Australia; Grand Slam tournament Hard, outdoor 14 – 28 January 2024	1 / 265	1R	(Netherlands) Botic van de Zandschulp	59	Win	6–4, 7–5, 6–3
Australian Open; Melbourne, Australia; Grand Slam tournament Hard, outdoor 14 – 28 January 2024	2 / 266	2R	(Netherlands) Jesper de Jong (Q)	161	Win	6–2, 6–2, 6–2
Australian Open; Melbourne, Australia; Grand Slam tournament Hard, outdoor 14 – 28 January 2024	3 / 267	3R	(Argentina) Sebastián Báez (26)	29	Win	6–0, 6–1, 6–3
Australian Open; Melbourne, Australia; Grand Slam tournament Hard, outdoor 14 – 28 January 2024	4 / 268	4R	Karen Khachanov (Note: Russian and Belarus players are not allowed to compete under the name or flag of their country following the Russian invasion of Ukraine.) (15)	15	Win	6–4, 7–5, 6–3
Australian Open; Melbourne, Australia; Grand Slam tournament Hard, outdoor 14 – 28 January 2024	5 / 269	QF	Andrey Rublev (5)	5	Win	6–4, 7–6^{(7–5)}, 6–3
Australian Open; Melbourne, Australia; Grand Slam tournament Hard, outdoor 14 – 28 January 2024	6 / 270	SF	(Serbia) Novak Djokovic (1)	1	Win	6–1, 6–2, 6–7^{(6–8)}, 6–3
Australian Open; Melbourne, Australia; Grand Slam tournament Hard, outdoor 14 – 28 January 2024	7 / 271	W	Daniil Medvedev (3)	3	Win (1)	3–6, 3–6, 6–4, 6–4, 6–3
Rotterdam Open; Rotterdam, The Netherlands; ATP 500; Hard, indoor 12 – 18 February 2024
Rotterdam Open; Rotterdam, The Netherlands; ATP 500; Hard, indoor 12 – 18 February 2024	8 / 272	1R	(Netherlands) Botic van de Zandschulp	66	Win	6–3, 6–3
Rotterdam Open; Rotterdam, The Netherlands; ATP 500; Hard, indoor 12 – 18 February 2024	9 / 273	2R	(France) Gaël Monfils (WC)	70	Win	6–3, 3–6, 6–3
Rotterdam Open; Rotterdam, The Netherlands; ATP 500; Hard, indoor 12 – 18 February 2024	10 / 274	QF	(Canada) Milos Raonic (PR)	309	Win	7–6^{(7–4)}, 1–1 ret.
Rotterdam Open; Rotterdam, The Netherlands; ATP 500; Hard, indoor 12 – 18 February 2024	11 / 275	SF	(Netherlands) Tallon Griekspoor	29	Win	6–2, 6–4
Rotterdam Open; Rotterdam, The Netherlands; ATP 500; Hard, indoor 12 – 18 February 2024	12 / 276	W	(Australia) Alex de Minaur (5)	11	Win (2)	7–5, 6–4
Indian Wells Open; Indian Wells, United States; ATP 1000; Hard, outdoor 6 – 17 March 2024
Indian Wells Open; Indian Wells, United States; ATP 1000; Hard, outdoor 6 – 17 March 2024	–	1R	Bye			
Indian Wells Open; Indian Wells, United States; ATP 1000; Hard, outdoor 6 – 17 March 2024	13 / 277	2R	(Australia) Thanasi Kokkinakis	99	Win	6–3, 6–0
Indian Wells Open; Indian Wells, United States; ATP 1000; Hard, outdoor 6 – 17 March 2024	14 / 278	3R	(Germany) Jan-Lennard Struff (25)	25	Win	6–3, 6–4
Indian Wells Open; Indian Wells, United States; ATP 1000; Hard, outdoor 6 – 17 March 2024	15 / 279	4R	(United States) Ben Shelton (16)	16	Win	7–6^{(7–4)}, 6–1
Indian Wells Open; Indian Wells, United States; ATP 1000; Hard, outdoor 6 – 17 March 2024	16 / 280	QF	(Czech Republic) Jiří Lehečka (32)	32	Win	6–3, 6–3
Indian Wells Open; Indian Wells, United States; ATP 1000; Hard, outdoor 6 – 17 March 2024	17 / 281	SF	(Spain) Carlos Alcaraz (2)	2	Loss	6–1, 3–6, 2–6
Miami Open; Miami Gardens, United States; ATP 1000; Hard, outdoor 20 – 31 March 2024
Miami Open; Miami Gardens, United States; ATP 1000; Hard, outdoor 20 – 31 March 2024	–	1R	Bye			
Miami Open; Miami Gardens, United States; ATP 1000; Hard, outdoor 20 – 31 March 2024	18 / 282	2R	(Italy) Andrea Vavassori (Q)	148	Win	6–3, 6–4
Miami Open; Miami Gardens, United States; ATP 1000; Hard, outdoor 20 – 31 March 2024	19 / 283	3R	(Netherlands) Tallon Griekspoor (25)	26	Win	5–7, 7–5, 6–1
Miami Open; Miami Gardens, United States; ATP 1000; Hard, outdoor 20 – 31 March 2024	20 / 284	4R	(Australia) Christopher O'Connell	66	Win	6–4, 6–3
Miami Open; Miami Gardens, United States; ATP 1000; Hard, outdoor 20 – 31 March 2024	21 / 285	QF	(Czech Republic) Tomáš Macháč	60	Win	6–4, 6–2
Miami Open; Miami Gardens, United States; ATP 1000; Hard, outdoor 20 – 31 March 2024	22 / 286	SF	Daniil Medvedev (3)	4	Win	6–1, 6–2
Miami Open; Miami Gardens, United States; ATP 1000; Hard, outdoor 20 – 31 March 2024	23 / 287	W	(Bulgaria) Grigor Dimitrov (11)	12	Win (3)	6–3, 6–1
Monte-Carlo Masters; Roquebrune-Cap-Martin, France; ATP 1000; Clay, outdoor 7 – 14 April 2024
Monte-Carlo Masters; Roquebrune-Cap-Martin, France; ATP 1000; Clay, outdoor 7 – 14 April 2024	–	1R	Bye			
Monte-Carlo Masters; Roquebrune-Cap-Martin, France; ATP 1000; Clay, outdoor 7 – 14 April 2024	24 / 288	2R	(United States) Sebastian Korda	27	Win	6–1, 6–2
Monte-Carlo Masters; Roquebrune-Cap-Martin, France; ATP 1000; Clay, outdoor 7 – 14 April 2024	25 / 289	3R	(Germany) Jan-Lennard Struff	25	Win	6–4, 6–2
Monte-Carlo Masters; Roquebrune-Cap-Martin, France; ATP 1000; Clay, outdoor 7 – 14 April 2024	26 / 290	QF	(Denmark) Holger Rune (7)	7	Win	6–4, 6–7^{(6–8)}, 6–3
Monte-Carlo Masters; Roquebrune-Cap-Martin, France; ATP 1000; Clay, outdoor 7 – 14 April 2024	27 / 291	SF	(Greece) Stefanos Tsitsipas (12)	12	Loss	4–6, 6–3, 4–6
Madrid Open; Madrid, Spain; ATP 1000; Clay, outdoor 24 April – 5 May 2024
Madrid Open; Madrid, Spain; ATP 1000; Clay, outdoor 24 April – 5 May 2024	–	1R	Bye			
Madrid Open; Madrid, Spain; ATP 1000; Clay, outdoor 24 April – 5 May 2024	28 / 292	2R	(Italy) Lorenzo Sonego	52	Win	6–0, 6–3
Madrid Open; Madrid, Spain; ATP 1000; Clay, outdoor 24 April – 5 May 2024	29 / 293	3R	Pavel Kotov	72	Win	6–2, 7–5
Madrid Open; Madrid, Spain; ATP 1000; Clay, outdoor 24 April – 5 May 2024	30 / 294	4R	Karen Khachanov (16)	17	Win	5–7, 6–3, 6–3
Madrid Open; Madrid, Spain; ATP 1000; Clay, outdoor 24 April – 5 May 2024	–	QF	(Canada) Félix Auger-Aliassime	35	Withdrew	N/A
Italian Open; Rome, Italy; ATP 1000; Clay, outdoor 8 – 19 May 2024
Italian Open; Rome, Italy; ATP 1000; Clay, outdoor 8 – 19 May 2024	Withdrew					
French Open; Paris, France; Grand Slam tournament Clay, outdoor 26 May – 9 June 2024
French Open; Paris, France; Grand Slam tournament Clay, outdoor 26 May – 9 June 2024	31 / 295	1R	(United States) Christopher Eubanks	46	Win	6–3, 6–3, 6–4
French Open; Paris, France; Grand Slam tournament Clay, outdoor 26 May – 9 June 2024	32 / 296	2R	(France) Richard Gasquet (WC)	124	Win	6–4, 6–2, 6–4
French Open; Paris, France; Grand Slam tournament Clay, outdoor 26 May – 9 June 2024	33 / 297	3R	Pavel Kotov	56	Win	6–4, 6–4, 6–4
French Open; Paris, France; Grand Slam tournament Clay, outdoor 26 May – 9 June 2024	34 / 298	4R	(France) Corentin Moutet	79	Win	2–6, 6–3, 6–2, 6–1
French Open; Paris, France; Grand Slam tournament Clay, outdoor 26 May – 9 June 2024	35 / 299	QF	(Bulgaria) Grigor Dimitrov (10)	10	Win	6–2, 6–4, 7–6^{(7–3)}
French Open; Paris, France; Grand Slam tournament Clay, outdoor 26 May – 9 June 2024	36 / 300	SF	(Spain) Carlos Alcaraz (3)	3	Loss	6–2, 3–6, 6–3, 4–6, 3–6
Halle Open; Halle, Germany; ATP 500; Grass, outdoor 17 – 23 June 2024
Halle Open; Halle, Germany; ATP 500; Grass, outdoor 17 – 23 June 2024	37 / 301	1R	(Netherlands) Tallon Griekspoor	27	Win	6–7^{(8–10)}, 6–3, 6–2
Halle Open; Halle, Germany; ATP 500; Grass, outdoor 17 – 23 June 2024	38 / 302	2R	(Hungary) Fábián Marozsán	45	Win	6–4, 6–7^{(4–7)}, 6–3
Halle Open; Halle, Germany; ATP 500; Grass, outdoor 17 – 23 June 2024	39 / 303	QF	(Germany) Jan-Lennard Struff	41	Win	6–2, 6–7^{(1–7)}, 7–6^{(7–3)}
Halle Open; Halle, Germany; ATP 500; Grass, outdoor 17 – 23 June 2024	40 / 304	SF	(China) Zhang Zhizhen	42	Win	6–4, 7–6^{(7–2)}
Halle Open; Halle, Germany; ATP 500; Grass, outdoor 17 – 23 June 2024	41 / 305	W	(Poland) Hubert Hurkacz (5)	9	Win (4)	7–6^{(10–8)}, 7–6^{(7–2)}
Wimbledon; London, United Kingdom; Grand Slam tournament Grass, outdoor 1 – 14 July 2024
Wimbledon; London, United Kingdom; Grand Slam tournament Grass, outdoor 1 – 14 July 2024	42 / 306	1R	(Germany) Yannick Hanfmann	110	Win	6–3, 6–4, 3–6, 6–3
Wimbledon; London, United Kingdom; Grand Slam tournament Grass, outdoor 1 – 14 July 2024	43 / 307	2R	(Italy) Matteo Berrettini	59	Win	7–6^{(7–3)}, 7–6^{(7–4)}, 2–6, 7–6^{(7–4)}
Wimbledon; London, United Kingdom; Grand Slam tournament Grass, outdoor 1 – 14 July 2024	44 / 308	3R	(Serbia) Miomir Kecmanović	52	Win	6–1, 6–4, 6–2
Wimbledon; London, United Kingdom; Grand Slam tournament Grass, outdoor 1 – 14 July 2024	45 / 309	4R	(United States) Ben Shelton (14)	14	Win	6–2, 6–4, 7–6^{(11–9)}
Wimbledon; London, United Kingdom; Grand Slam tournament Grass, outdoor 1 – 14 July 2024	46 / 310	QF	Daniil Medvedev (5)	5	Loss	7–6^{(9–7)}, 4–6, 6–7^{(4–7)}, 6–2, 3–6
Summer Olympics; Paris, France; Olympics; Clay, outdoor 27 July – 4 August 2024
Summer Olympics; Paris, France; Olympics; Clay, outdoor 27 July – 4 August 2024	Withdrew					
Canadian Open; Montreal, Canada; ATP 1000; Hard, outdoor 6 – 12 August 2024
Canadian Open; Montreal, Canada; ATP 1000; Hard, outdoor 6 – 12 August 2024	–	1R	Bye			
Canadian Open; Montreal, Canada; ATP 1000; Hard, outdoor 6 – 12 August 2024	47 / 311	2R	(Croatia) Borna Ćorić (Q)	94	Win	6–2, 6–4
Canadian Open; Montreal, Canada; ATP 1000; Hard, outdoor 6 – 12 August 2024	48 / 312	3R	(Chile) Alejandro Tabilo (15)	21	Win	6–4, 6–3
Canadian Open; Montreal, Canada; ATP 1000; Hard, outdoor 6 – 12 August 2024	49 / 313	QF	Andrey Rublev (5)	8	Loss	3–6, 6–1, 2–6
Cincinnati Open; Cincinnati, United States; ATP 1000; Hard, outdoor 12 – 19 August 2024
Cincinnati Open; Cincinnati, United States; ATP 1000; Hard, outdoor 12 – 19 August 2024	–	1R	Bye			
Cincinnati Open; Cincinnati, United States; ATP 1000; Hard, outdoor 12 – 19 August 2024	50 / 314	2R	(United States) Alex Michelsen (Q)	57	Win	6–4, 7–5
Cincinnati Open; Cincinnati, United States; ATP 1000; Hard, outdoor 12 – 19 August 2024	–	3R	(Australia) Jordan Thompson	32	Walkover	N/A
Cincinnati Open; Cincinnati, United States; ATP 1000; Hard, outdoor 12 – 19 August 2024	51 / 315	QF	Andrey Rublev (6)	6	Win	4–6, 7–5, 6–4
Cincinnati Open; Cincinnati, United States; ATP 1000; Hard, outdoor 12 – 19 August 2024	52 / 316	SF	(Germany) Alexander Zverev (3)	4	Win	7–6^{(11–9)}, 5–7, 7–6^{(7–4)}
Cincinnati Open; Cincinnati, United States; ATP 1000; Hard, outdoor 12 – 19 August 2024	53 / 317	W	(United States) Frances Tiafoe	27	Win (5)	7–6^{(7–4)}, 6–2
US Open; New York City, United States; Grand Slam tournament Hard, outdoor 26 August – 8 September 2024
US Open; New York City, United States; Grand Slam tournament Hard, outdoor 26 August – 8 September 2024	54 / 318	1R	(United States) Mackenzie McDonald	140	Win	2–6, 6–2, 6–1, 6–2
US Open; New York City, United States; Grand Slam tournament Hard, outdoor 26 August – 8 September 2024	55 / 319	2R	(United States) Alex Michelsen	49	Win	6–4, 6–0, 6–2
US Open; New York City, United States; Grand Slam tournament Hard, outdoor 26 August – 8 September 2024	56 / 320	3R	(Australia) Christopher O'Connell	87	Win	6–1, 6–4, 6–2
US Open; New York City, United States; Grand Slam tournament Hard, outdoor 26 August – 8 September 2024	57 / 321	4R	(United States) Tommy Paul (14)	14	Win	7–6^{(7–3)}, 7–6^{(7–5)}, 6–1
US Open; New York City, United States; Grand Slam tournament Hard, outdoor 26 August – 8 September 2024	58 / 322	QF	Daniil Medvedev (5)	5	Win	6–2, 1–6, 6–1, 6–4
US Open; New York City, United States; Grand Slam tournament Hard, outdoor 26 August – 8 September 2024	59 / 323	SF	(United Kingdom) Jack Draper (25)	25	Win	7–5, 7–6^{(7–3)}, 6–2
US Open; New York City, United States; Grand Slam tournament Hard, outdoor 26 August – 8 September 2024	60 / 324	W	(United States) Taylor Fritz (12)	12	Win (6)	6–3, 6–4, 7–5
China Open; Beijing, China; ATP 500; Hard, outdoor 26 September – 2 October 2024
China Open; Beijing, China; ATP 500; Hard, outdoor 26 September – 2 October 2024	61 / 325	1R	(Chile) Nicolás Jarry	28	Win	4–6, 6–3, 6–1
China Open; Beijing, China; ATP 500; Hard, outdoor 26 September – 2 October 2024	62 / 326	2R	Roman Safiullin (LL)	69	Win	3–6, 6–2, 6–3
China Open; Beijing, China; ATP 500; Hard, outdoor 26 September – 2 October 2024	63 / 327	QF	(Czech Republic) Jiří Lehečka	37	Win	6–2, 7–6^{(8–6)}
China Open; Beijing, China; ATP 500; Hard, outdoor 26 September – 2 October 2024	64 / 328	SF	(China) Bu Yunchaokete (WC)	96	Win	6–3, 7–6^{(7–3)}
China Open; Beijing, China; ATP 500; Hard, outdoor 26 September – 2 October 2024	65 / 329	F	(Spain) Carlos Alcaraz (2)	3	Loss	7–6^{(8–6)}, 4–6, 6–7^{(3–7)}
Shanghai Masters; Shanghai, China; ATP 1000; Hard, outdoor 2 – 13 October 2024
Shanghai Masters; Shanghai, China; ATP 1000; Hard, outdoor 2 – 13 October 2024	–	1R	Bye			
Shanghai Masters; Shanghai, China; ATP 1000; Hard, outdoor 2 – 13 October 2024	66 / 330	2R	(Japan) Taro Daniel	93	Win	6–1, 6–4
Shanghai Masters; Shanghai, China; ATP 1000; Hard, outdoor 2 – 13 October 2024	67 / 331	3R	(Argentina) Tomás Martín Etcheverry (31)	37	Win	6–7^{(3–7)}, 6–4, 6–2
Shanghai Masters; Shanghai, China; ATP 1000; Hard, outdoor 2 – 13 October 2024	68 / 332	4R	(United States) Ben Shelton (14)	16	Win	6–4, 7–6^{(7–1)}
Shanghai Masters; Shanghai, China; ATP 1000; Hard, outdoor 2 – 13 October 2024	69 / 333	QF	Daniil Medvedev (5)	5	Win	6–1, 6–4
Shanghai Masters; Shanghai, China; ATP 1000; Hard, outdoor 2 – 13 October 2024	70 / 334	SF	(Czech Republic) Tomáš Macháč (30)	33	Win	6–4, 7–5
Shanghai Masters; Shanghai, China; ATP 1000; Hard, outdoor 2 – 13 October 2024	71 / 335	W	(Serbia) Novak Djokovic (4)	4	Win (7)	7–6^{(7–4)}, 6–3
Paris Masters; Paris, France; ATP 1000; Hard, indoor 28 October – 3 November 2024
Paris Masters; Paris, France; ATP 1000; Hard, indoor 28 October – 3 November 2024	Withdrew					
ATP Finals; Turin, Italy; ATP Finals; Hard, indoor 10 – 17 November 2024
ATP Finals; Turin, Italy; ATP Finals; Hard, indoor 10 – 17 November 2024	72 / 336	RR	(Australia) Alex de Minaur (7)	9	Win	6–3, 6–4
ATP Finals; Turin, Italy; ATP Finals; Hard, indoor 10 – 17 November 2024	73 / 337	RR	(United States) Taylor Fritz (5)	5	Win	6–4, 6–4
ATP Finals; Turin, Italy; ATP Finals; Hard, indoor 10 – 17 November 2024	74 / 338	RR	Daniil Medvedev (4)	4	Win	6–3, 6–4
ATP Finals; Turin, Italy; ATP Finals; Hard, indoor 10 – 17 November 2024	75 / 339	SF	(Norway) Casper Ruud (6)	7	Win	6–1, 6–2
ATP Finals; Turin, Italy; ATP Finals; Hard, indoor 10 – 17 November 2024	76 / 340	W	(United States) Taylor Fritz (5)	5	Win (8)	6–4, 6–4
Davis Cup Finals; Knockout stage Málaga, Spain; Davis Cup; Hard, indoor 19 – 24 November 2024
Davis Cup Finals; Knockout stage Málaga, Spain; Davis Cup; Hard, indoor 19 – 24 November 2024	77 / 341	QF	(Argentina) Sebastián Báez	27	Win	6–2, 6–1
Davis Cup Finals; Knockout stage Málaga, Spain; Davis Cup; Hard, indoor 19 – 24 November 2024	78 / 342	SF	(Australia) Alex de Minaur	9	Win	6–3, 6–4
Davis Cup Finals; Knockout stage Málaga, Spain; Davis Cup; Hard, indoor 19 – 24 November 2024	79 / 343	W	(Netherlands) Tallon Griekspoor	40	Win	7–6^{(7–2)}, 6–2

=== Doubles matches ===
Tournament	Match	Round	Opponent (seed or key)	Rank	Result	Score
Indian Wells Open; Indian Wells, United States; ATP 1000; Hard, outdoor 6 – 17 March 2024; Partner: (Italy) Lorenzo Sonego
Indian Wells Open; Indian Wells, United States; ATP 1000; Hard, outdoor 6 – 17 March 2024; Partner: (Italy) Lorenzo Sonego	1 / 43	1R	Karen Khachanov / Andrey Rublev	54 / 49	Win	7–5, 6–1
Indian Wells Open; Indian Wells, United States; ATP 1000; Hard, outdoor 6 – 17 March 2024; Partner: (Italy) Lorenzo Sonego	2 / 44	2R	(Spain) Marcel Granollers / (Argentina) Horacio Zeballos	10 / 11	Loss	6–7^{(0–7)}, 3–6
Monte-Carlo Masters; Roquebrune-Cap-Martin, France; ATP 1000; Clay, outdoor 7 – 14 April 2024; Partner: (Italy) Lorenzo Sonego
Monte-Carlo Masters; Roquebrune-Cap-Martin, France; ATP 1000; Clay, outdoor 7 – 14 April 2024; Partner: (Italy) Lorenzo Sonego	3 / 45	1R	(Belgium) Sander Gillé / (Belgium) Joran Vliegen	29 / 29	Loss	7–6^{(7–3)}, 5–7, [7–10]
Halle Open; Halle, Germany; ATP 500; Grass, outdoor 17 – 23 June 2024; Partner: (Poland) Hubert Hurkacz
Halle Open; Halle, Germany; ATP 500; Grass, outdoor 17 – 23 June 2024; Partner: (Poland) Hubert Hurkacz	4 / 46	1R	(United States) Nathaniel Lammons / (United States) Jackson Withrow (3)	22 / 22	Win	6–4, 5–7, [10–8]
Halle Open; Halle, Germany; ATP 500; Grass, outdoor 17 – 23 June 2024; Partner: (Poland) Hubert Hurkacz	5 / 47	2R	(France) Sadio Doumbia / (France) Fabien Reboul	34 / 33	Loss	6–7^{(3–7)}, 6–4, [8–10]
Summer Olympics; Paris, France; Olympics; Clay, outdoor 27 July – 4 August 2024; Partner: (Italy) Lorenzo Musetti
Summer Olympics; Paris, France; Olympics; Clay, outdoor 27 July – 4 August 2024; Partner: (Italy) Lorenzo Musetti	Withdrew					
Canadian Open; Montreal, Canada; ATP 1000; Hard, outdoor 6–12 August 2024; Partner: (United Kingdom) Jack Draper
Canadian Open; Montreal, Canada; ATP 1000; Hard, outdoor 6–12 August 2024; Partner: (United Kingdom) Jack Draper	6 / 48	1R	(Belgium) Sander Gillé / (Belgium) Joran Vliegen (16)	35 / 35	Win	6–0, 6–7^{(3–7)}, [10–8]
Canadian Open; Montreal, Canada; ATP 1000; Hard, outdoor 6–12 August 2024; Partner: (United Kingdom) Jack Draper	7 / 49	2R	(Kazakhstan) Alexander Bublik / (United States) Ben Shelton	133 / 102	Win	7–6^{(7–2)}, 6–1
Canadian Open; Montreal, Canada; ATP 1000; Hard, outdoor 6–12 August 2024; Partner: (United Kingdom) Jack Draper	–	QF	(Monaco) Hugo Nys / (Poland) Jan Zieliński (14)	30 / 31	Withdrew	N/A
Davis Cup Finals; Knockout stage Málaga, Spain; Davis Cup; Hard, indoor 19 – 24 November 2024; Partner: (Italy) Matteo Berrettini
Davis Cup Finals; Knockout stage Málaga, Spain; Davis Cup; Hard, indoor 19 – 24 November 2024; Partner: (Italy) Matteo Berrettini	8 / 50	QF	(Argentina) Máximo González / (Argentina) Andrés Molteni	22 / 21	Win	6–4, 7–5

== Exhibition matches ==
=== Singles ===
Tournament	Match	Round	Opponent (seed or key)	Rank	Result	Score
Kooyong Classic; Melbourne, Australia Hard, outdoor 10 – 12 January 2024
Kooyong Classic; Melbourne, Australia Hard, outdoor 10 – 12 January 2024	1	PO	(Australia) Marc Polmans	156	Win	6–4, 6–0
Kooyong Classic; Melbourne, Australia Hard, outdoor 10 – 12 January 2024	2	PO	(Norway) Casper Ruud	11	Win	6–2, 6–3
6 Kings Slam; Riyadh, Saudi Arabia Hard, outdoor 16 – 19 October 2024
6 Kings Slam; Riyadh, Saudi Arabia Hard, outdoor 16 – 19 October 2024	3	QF	Daniil Medvedev	5	Win	6–0, 6–3
6 Kings Slam; Riyadh, Saudi Arabia Hard, outdoor 16 – 19 October 2024	4	SF	(Serbia) Novak Djokovic	4	Win	6–2, 6–7^{(0–7)}, 6–4
6 Kings Slam; Riyadh, Saudi Arabia Hard, outdoor 16 – 19 October 2024	5	W	(Spain) Carlos Alcaraz	2	Win	6–7^{(5–7)}, 6–3, 6–3

== Schedule ==
Per Jannik Sinner, this is his current 2024 schedule (subject to change).

=== Singles schedule ===
Date	Tournament	Location	Tier	Surface	Prev. result	Prev. points	New points	Result
8 January 2024– 14 January 2024	Adelaide International	Adelaide (AUS)	250 Series	Hard	QF	45	0	Withdrew
14 January 2024– 28 January 2024	Australian Open	Melbourne (AUS)	Grand Slam	Hard	4R	180	2000	Champion (defeated Daniil Medvedev 3–6, 3–6, 6–4, 6–4, 6–3)
29 January 2024– 4 February 2024	Open Sud de France	Montpellier (FRA)	250 Series	Hard (i)	W	250	0	Withdrew
12 February 2024– 18 February 2024	Rotterdam Open	Rotterdam (NED)	500 Series	Hard (i)	F	300	500	Champion (defeated Alex de Minaur 7–5, 6–4)
6 March 2024– 17 March 2024	Indian Wells Open	Indian Wells (USA)	Masters 1000	Hard	SF	360	400	Semifinals (lost to Carlos Alcaraz 6–1, 3–6, 2–6)
20 March 2024– 31 March 2024	Miami Open	Miami (USA)	Masters 1000	Hard	F	600	1000	Champion (defeated Grigor Dimitrov 6–3, 6–1)
8 April 2024– 14 April 2024	Monte-Carlo Masters	Roquebrune-Cap-Martin (FRA)	Masters 1000	Clay	SF	360	400	Semifinals (lost to Stefanos Tsitsipas 4–6, 6–3, 4–6)
15 April 2024– 21 April 2024	Barcelona Open	Barcelona (ESP)	500 Series	Clay	QF	90	0	Withdrew
24 April 2024 – 5 May 2024	Madrid Open	Madrid (ESP)	Masters 1000	Clay	A	0	200	Withdrew before the Quarterfinals due to a hip injury
8 May 2024– 19 May 2024	Italian Open	Rome (ITA)	Masters 1000	Clay	4R	90	0	Withdrew
26 May 2024– 9 June 2024	French Open	Paris (FRA)	Grand Slam	Clay	2R	45	800	Semifinals (lost to Carlos Alcaraz 6–2, 3–6, 6–3, 4–6, 3–6)
17 June 2024– 23 June 2024	Halle Open	Halle (GER)	500 Series	Grass	QF	90	500	Champion (defeated Hubert Hurkacz 7–6^{(10–8)}, 7–6^{(7–2)})
1 July 2024– 14 July 2024	Wimbledon	London (GBR)	Grand Slam	Grass	SF	720	400	Quarterfinals (lost to Daniil Medvedev 7–6^{(7–9)}, 4–6, 6–7^{(4–7)}, 6–2, 3–6)
27 July 2024– 4 August 2024	Summer Olympics	Paris (FRA)	Olympic Games	Clay	NH	N/A	N/A	Withdrew
6 August 2024– 12 August 2024	Canadian Open	Montreal (CAN)	Masters 1000	Hard	W	1000	200	Quarterfinals (lost to Andrey Rublev 3–6, 6–1, 2–6)
12 August 2024– 19 August 2024	Cincinnati Open	Cincinnati (USA)	Masters 1000	Hard	2R	10	1000	Champion (defeated Frances Tiafoe 7–6^{(7–4)}, 6–2)
26 August 2024– 8 September 2024	US Open	New York City (USA)	Grand Slam	Hard	4R	180	2000	Champion (defeated Taylor Fritz 6–3, 6–4, 7–5)
26 September 2024– 2 October 2024	China Open	Beijing (CHN)	500 Series	Hard	W	500	330	Final (lost to Carlos Alcaraz 7–6^{(8–6)}, 4–6, 6–7^{(3–7)})
2 October 2024– 13 October 2024	Shanghai Masters	Shanghai (CHN)	Masters 1000	Hard	4R	90	1000	Champion (defeated Novak Djokovic 7–6^{(7–4)}, 6–3)
28 October 2024– 3 November 2024	Paris Masters	Paris (FRA)	Masters 1000	Hard (i)	3R	90	0	Withdrew
10 November 2024– 17 November 2024	ATP Finals	Turin (ITA)	Tour Finals	Hard (i)	F	1000	1500	Champion (defeated Taylor Fritz 6–4, 6–4)
19 November 2024– 24 November 2024	Davis Cup Finals Knockout stage	Málaga (ESP)	Davis Cup	Hard (i)	W	N/A	N/A	Winner ( Italy defeated Netherlands, 2–0)
Total year-end points (as of ATP Finals)						6490	11830	▲5340
Total year-end points						6490	11830	difference
Source: Rankings breakdown

== Yearly records ==
=== Head-to-head matchups ===
Jannik Sinner has a 73–6 (92.41%) ATP match win–loss record in the 2024 season. His record against players who were part of the ATP rankings Top Ten at the time of their meetings is 18–5 (78.26%). Bold indicates player was ranked top 10 at the time of at least one meeting. The following list is ordered by number of wins:

- **Daniil Medvedev** 5–1
- (Netherlands) Tallon Griekspoor 4–0
- (Australia) **Alex de Minaur** 3–0
- (United States) **Taylor Fritz** 3–0
- (United States) Ben Shelton 3–0
- (Germany) Jan-Lennard Struff 3–0
- (Argentina) Sebastián Báez 2–0
- (Australia) Christopher O'Connell 2–0
- (Bulgaria) **Grigor Dimitrov** 2–0
- (Serbia) **Novak Djokovic** 2–0
- Karen Khachanov 2–0
- Pavel Kotov 2–0
- (Czech Republic) Jiří Lehečka 2–0
- (Czech Republic) Tomáš Macháč 2–0
- (United States) Alex Michelsen 2–0
- (Netherlands) Botic van de Zandschulp 2–0
- **Andrey Rublev** 2–1
- (Italy) Matteo Berrettini 1–0
- (China) Bu Yunchaokete 1–0
- (Croatia) Borna Ćorić 1–0
- (Japan) Taro Daniel 1–0
- (Netherlands) Jesper de Jong 1–0
- (United Kingdom) Jack Draper 1–0
- (Argentina) Tomás Martín Etcheverry 1–0
- (United States) Christopher Eubanks 1–0
- (France) Richard Gasquet 1–0
- (Germany) Yannick Hanfmann 1–0
- (Poland) **Hubert Hurkacz** 1–0
- (Chile) Nicolás Jarry 1–0
- (Serbia) Miomir Kecmanović 1–0
- (Australia) Thanasi Kokkinakis 1–0
- (United States) Sebastian Korda 1–0
- (Hungary) Fábián Marozsán 1–0
- (United States) Mackenzie McDonald 1–0
- (France) Gaël Monfils 1–0
- (France) Corentin Moutet 1–0
- (United States) Tommy Paul 1–0
- (Canada) Milos Raonic 1–0
- (Denmark) **Holger Rune** 1–0
- (Norway) **Casper Ruud** 1–0
- Roman Safiullin 1–0
- (Italy) Lorenzo Sonego 1–0
- (Chile) Alejandro Tabilo 1–0
- (United States) Frances Tiafoe 1–0
- (Italy) Andrea Vavassori 1–0
- (China) Zhang Zhizhen 1–0
- (Germany) **Alexander Zverev** 1–0
- (Greece) Stefanos Tsitsipas 0–1
- (Spain) **Carlos Alcaraz** 0–3

* Statistics correct as of 24 November 2024.

=== Top 10 record (18–5) ===
Category Grand Slam (5–2) ATP Finals (5–0) Masters 1000 (6–2) 500 Series (1–1) 250 Series (0–0) Davis Cup (1–0)	Wins by surface Hard (15–3) Clay (2–1) Grass (1–1)	Wins by setting Outdoor (13–5) Indoor (5–0)

Result	W–L	Player	Rk	Event	Surface	Rd	Score	Rk	Ref
Win	1–0	Andrey Rublev	5	Australian Open, Australia	Hard	QF	6–4, 7–6^{(7–5)}, 6–3	4	
Win	2–0	(Serbia) Novak Djokovic	**1**	Australian Open, Australia	Hard	SF	6–1, 6–2, 6–7^{(6–8)}, 6–3	4	
Win	3–0	Daniil Medvedev	3	Australian Open, Australia	Hard	F	3–6, 3–6, 6–4, 6–4, 6–3	4	
Loss	3–1	(Spain) Carlos Alcaraz	2	Indian Wells Open, United States	Hard	SF	6–1, 3–6, 2–6	3	
Win	4–1	Daniil Medvedev	4	Miami Open, United States	Hard	SF	6–1, 6–2	3	
Win	5–1	(Denmark) Holger Rune	7	Monte-Carlo Masters, France	Clay	QF	6–4, 6–7^{(6–8)}, 6–3	2	
Win	6–1	(Bulgaria) Grigor Dimitrov	10	French Open, France	Clay	QF	6–2, 6–4, 7–6^{(7–3)}	2	
Loss	6–2	(Spain) Carlos Alcaraz	3	French Open, France	Clay	SF	6–2, 3–6, 6–3, 4–6, 3–6	2	
Win	7–2	(Poland) Hubert Hurkacz	9	Halle Open, Germany	Grass	F	7–6^{(10–8)}, 7–6^{(7–2)}	**1**	
Loss	7–3	Daniil Medvedev	5	Wimbledon, United Kingdom	Grass	QF	7–6^{(9–7)}, 4–6, 6–7^{(4–7)}, 6–2, 3–6	**1**	
Loss	7–4	Andrey Rublev	8	Canadian Open, Canada	Hard	QF	3–6, 6–1, 2–6	**1**	
Win	8–4	Andrey Rublev	6	Cincinnati Open, United States	Hard	QF	4–6, 7–5, 6–4	**1**	
Win	9–4	(Germany) Alexander Zverev	4	Cincinnati Open, United States	Hard	SF	7–6^{(11–9)}, 5–7, 7–6^{(7–4)}	**1**	
Win	10–4	Daniil Medvedev	5	US Open, United States	Hard	QF	6–2, 1–6, 6–1, 6–4	**1**	
Loss	10–5	(Spain) Carlos Alcaraz	3	China Open, China	Hard	F	7–6^{(8–6)}, 4–6, 6–7^{(3–7)}	**1**	
Win	11–5	Daniil Medvedev	5	Shanghai Masters, China	Hard	QF	6–1, 6–4	**1**	
Win	12–5	(Serbia) Novak Djokovic	4	Shanghai Masters, China	Hard	F	7–6^{(7–4)}, 6–3	**1**	
Win	13–5	(Australia) Alex de Minaur	9	ATP Finals, Italy	Hard (i)	RR	6–3, 6–4	**1**	
Win	14–5	(United States) Taylor Fritz	5	ATP Finals, Italy	Hard (i)	RR	6–4, 6–4	**1**	
Win	15–5	Daniil Medvedev	4	ATP Finals, Italy	Hard (i)	RR	6–3, 6–4	**1**	
Win	16–5	(Norway) Casper Ruud	7	ATP Finals, Italy	Hard (i)	SF	6–1, 6–2	**1**	
Win	17–5	(United States) Taylor Fritz	5	ATP Finals, Italy	Hard (i)	F	6–4, 6–4	**1**	
Win	18–5	(Australia) Alex de Minaur	9	Davis Cup, Spain	Hard (i)	SF	6–3, 6–4	**1**	

- Key: (Rk) first use, opponent rank; (Rd) round; (Rk) 2nd use, player rank; (Ref) reference; (F) final; (SF) semifinal; (QF) quarterfinal; (#R) rounds 4, 3, 2, 1; (RR) round-robin stage; (Q#) qualifying rounds or stages (3), 2, 1.

=== Finals ===
==== Singles: 9 (8 titles, 1 runner-up) ====
Category Grand Slam (2–0) ATP Finals (1–0) ATP Masters 1000 (3–0) ATP 500 Series (2–1) ATP 250 Series (0–0)	Titles by surface Hard (7–1) Clay (0–0) Grass (1–0)	Titles by setting Outdoor (6–1) Indoor (2–0)

Result	W–L	Date	Tournament	Tier	Surface	Opponent	Score
Win	1–0	Jan 2024	Australian Open, Australia	Grand Slam	Hard	Daniil Medvedev	3–6, 3–6, 6–4, 6–4, 6–3
Win	2–0	Feb 2024	Rotterdam Open, Netherlands	500 Series	Hard (i)	(Australia) Alex de Minaur	7–5, 6–4
Win	3–0	Mar 2024	Miami Open, United States	Masters 1000	Hard	(Bulgaria) Grigor Dimitrov	6–3, 6–1
Win	4–0	Jun 2024	Halle Open, Germany	500 Series	Grass	(Poland) Hubert Hurkacz	7–6^{(10–8)}, 7–6^{(7–2)}
Win	5–0	Aug 2024	Cincinnati Open, United States	Masters 1000	Hard	(United States) Frances Tiafoe	7–6^{(7–4)}, 6–2
Win	6–0	Sep 2024	US Open, United States	Grand Slam	Hard	(United States) Taylor Fritz	6–3, 6–4, 7–5
Loss	6–1	Oct 2024	China Open, China	500 Series	Hard	(Spain) Carlos Alcaraz	7–6^{(8–6)}, 4–6, 6–7^{(3–7)}
Win	7–1	Oct 2024	Shanghai Masters, China	Masters 1000	Hard	(Serbia) Novak Djokovic	7–6^{(7–4)}, 6–3
Win	8–1	Nov 2024	ATP Finals, Italy	ATP Finals	Hard (i)	(United States) Taylor Fritz	6–4, 6–4

=== Earnings ===
- **Bold** font denotes tournament win

**Singles**
Event	Prize money	Year-to-date
**Australian Open**	**A$3,150,000**	$2,105,775
**Rotterdam Open**	**€399,215**	$2,536,288
Indian Wells Open	$0	$2,536,288
**Miami Open**	**$1,100,000**	$3,636,288
Monte-Carlo Masters	€274,425	$3,933,627
Madrid Open	€161,995	$4,106,249
French Open	€650,000	$4,812,734
**Halle Open**	**€421,790**	$5,264,007
Wimbledon Championships	£375,000	$5,738,195
Canadian Open	$170,940	$5,909,135
**Cincinnati Open**	**$1,049,460**	$6,958,595
**US Open**	**$3,600,000**	$10,558,595
China Open	$374,340	$10,932,935
**Shanghai Masters**	**$1,100,000**	$12,032,935
**ATP Finals**	**$4,881,100**	$16,914,035
Bonus Pool ATP Ranking: 1	$2,479,554	$19,393,589
Bonus Pool ATP 500 Ranking: 2	$310,000	$19,703,589
		$19,703,589
**Doubles**
Event	Prize money	Year-to-date
Indian Wells Open	$0	$0
Monte-Carlo Masters	€6,965	$7,546
Halle Open	€9,345	$17,544
Canadian Open	$14,570	$32,114
		$32,114
**Total**
		**$19,735,703**

Figures in United States dollars (USD) unless noted.

- source：2024 Singles Activity
- source：2024 Doubles Activity

== See also ==
- 2024 ATP Tour
- 2024 Novak Djokovic tennis season
- 2024 Daniil Medvedev tennis season
- 2024 Carlos Alcaraz tennis season
