= 2024 Daniil Medvedev tennis season =

Tennis player season

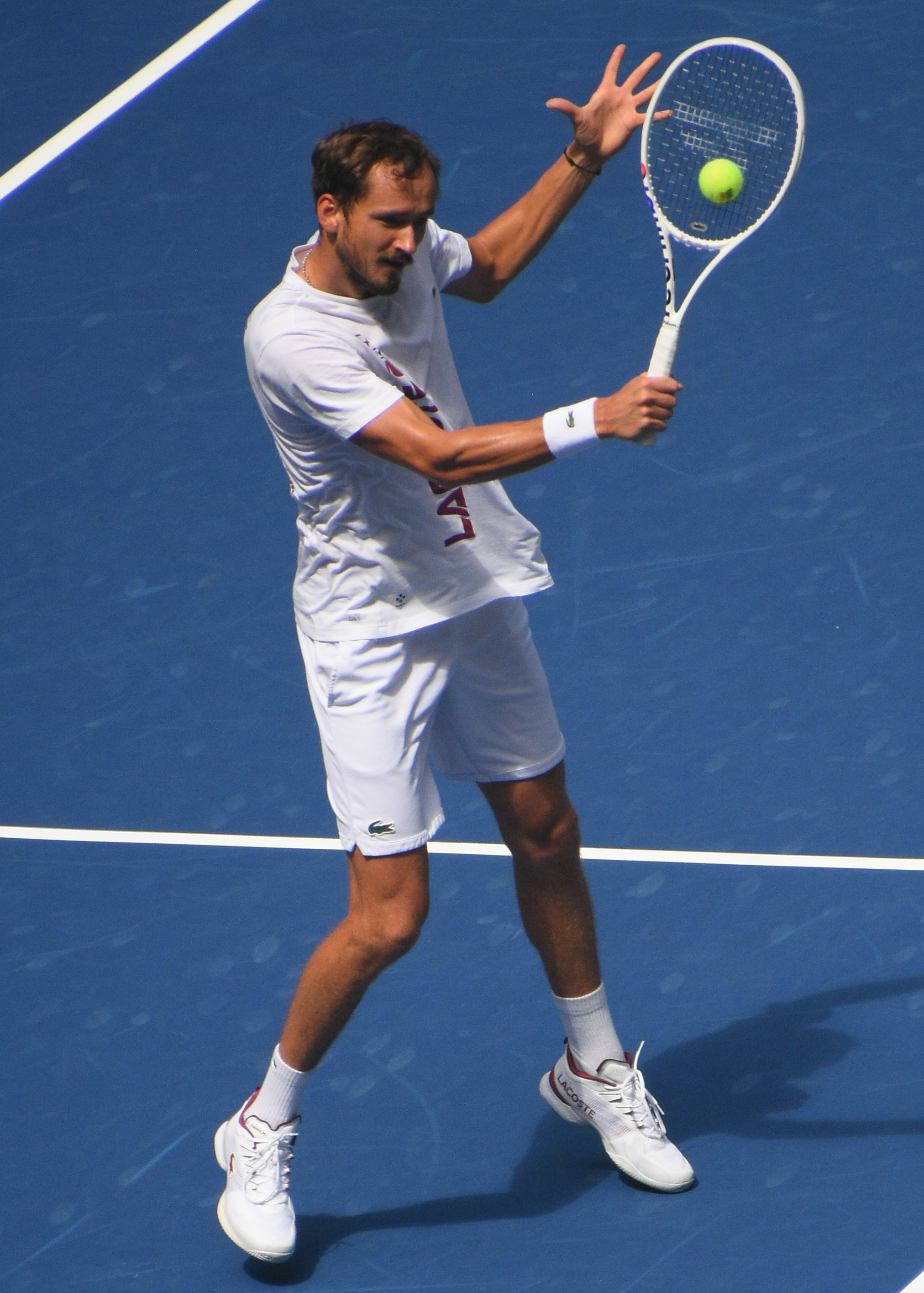
- Medvedev at the 2023 US Open
- Full name: Daniil Medvedev
- Country: (Note: Russian and Belarus players are not allowed to compete under the name or flag of their country following the Russian invasion of Ukraine.)
- Calendar prize money: $6,519,660

Singles
- Season record: 46–21 (68.7%)
- Calendar titles: 0
- Year-end ranking: No. 5
- Ranking change from previous year: ▼2

Grand Slam & significant results
- Australian Open: F
- French Open: 4R
- Wimbledon: SF
- US Open: QF
- Olympic Games: 3R

Doubles
- Season record: 2–4 (33.33%)
- Current ranking: No. 332
- Ranking change from previous year: New entry

Davis Cup
- Davis Cup: N/A

The 2024 Daniil Medvedev tennis season officially began on 14 January 2024, with the start of the Australian Open in Melbourne. Despite reaching the Australian Open final in January, Medvedev failed to win a title in a year for the first time since 2017.

== Yearly summary ==
=== Early hard court season ===
At the 2024 Australian Open he defeated Emil Ruusuvuori in the second round from two sets down and recorded the third-latest match finish at 3:39AM in the history of this Major. He then defeated Félix Auger-Aliassime and Nuno Borges to reach the quarterfinals. He then won back-to-back 5-set matches against Hubert Hurkacz and Alexander Zverev, coming back from two sets down to defeat the latter, to reach his third Australian Open final. He lost the final to Jannik Sinner in five sets, having led by two sets to love. It was his second loss in the Australian Open final after having led by two sets to love, after his loss in the 2022 Australian Open final to Rafael Nadal, becoming the only man in the Open Era to lose two major finals from a two-set lead. At the end of the tournament Medvedev played four five-set matches in total and set two records, one for the most time spent on court at a Grand Slam tournament with 24 hours and 17 minutes, and for the most number of sets played in a singles major, at 31 sets.

At the 2024 Miami Open he defeated Dominik Koepfer to reach the quarterfinals and recorded his 350th career win becoming only the fourth man born in the 1990s or later to reach that milestone.

== All matches ==
This table chronicles all the matches of Daniil Medvedev in 2024

Key
W	F	SF	QF	#R	RR	Q#	P#	DNQ	A	Z#	PO	G	S	B	NMS	NTI	P	NH

(W) winner; (F) finalist; (SF) semifinalist; (QF) quarterfinalist; (#R) rounds 4, 3, 2, 1; (RR) round-robin stage; (Q#) qualification round; (P#) preliminary round; (DNQ) did not qualify; (A) absent; (Z#) Davis/Fed Cup Zonal Group (with number indication) or (PO) play-off; (G) gold, (S) silver or (B) bronze Olympic/Paralympic medal; (NMS) not a Masters tournament; (NTI) not a Tier I tournament; (P) postponed; (NH) not held; (SR) strike rate (events won / competed); (W–L) win–loss record.
To avoid confusion and double counting, these charts are updated at the conclusion of a tournament or when the player's participation has ended.

=== Singles matches ===
Tournament	Match	Round	Opponent (seed or key)	Rank	Result	Score
Australian Open; Melbourne, Australia; Grand Slam tournament Hard, outdoor 14 – 28 January 2024
Australian Open; Melbourne, Australia; Grand Slam tournament Hard, outdoor 14 – 28 January 2024	1 / 470	1R	(France) Térence Atmane (Q)	144	Win	5–7, 6–2, 6–4, 1–0 Ret.
Australian Open; Melbourne, Australia; Grand Slam tournament Hard, outdoor 14 – 28 January 2024	2 / 471	2R	(Finland) Emil Ruusuvuori	53	Win	3–6, 6–7^{(1–7)}, 6–4, 7–6^{(7–1)}, 6–0
Australian Open; Melbourne, Australia; Grand Slam tournament Hard, outdoor 14 – 28 January 2024	3 / 472	3R	(Canada) Félix Auger-Aliassime (27)	30	Win	6–3, 6–4, 6–3
Australian Open; Melbourne, Australia; Grand Slam tournament Hard, outdoor 14 – 28 January 2024	4 / 473	4R	(Portugal) Nuno Borges	69	Win	6–3, 7–6^{(7–4)}, 5–7, 6–1
Australian Open; Melbourne, Australia; Grand Slam tournament Hard, outdoor 14 – 28 January 2024	5 / 474	QF	(Poland) Hubert Hurkacz (9)	9	Win	7–6^{(7–4)}, 2–6, 6–3, 5–7, 6–4
Australian Open; Melbourne, Australia; Grand Slam tournament Hard, outdoor 14 – 28 January 2024	6 / 475	SF	(Germany) Alexander Zverev (6)	6	Win	5–7, 3–6, 7–6^{(7–4)}, 7–6^{(7–5)}, 6–3
Australian Open; Melbourne, Australia; Grand Slam tournament Hard, outdoor 14 – 28 January 2024	7 / 476	F	(Italy) Jannik Sinner (4)	4	Loss	6–3, 6–3, 4–6, 4–6, 3–6
Rotterdam Open; Rotterdam, Netherlands; ATP 500; Hard, indoor 12 – 18 February 2024
Rotterdam Open; Rotterdam, Netherlands; ATP 500; Hard, indoor 12 – 18 February 2024	Withdrew					
Qatar Open; Doha, Qatar; ATP 250; Hard, outdoor 19 – 24 February 2024
Qatar Open; Doha, Qatar; ATP 250; Hard, outdoor 19 – 24 February 2024	Withdrew					
Dubai Tennis Championships; Dubai, United Arab Emirates; ATP 500; Hard, outdoor 26 February – 2 March 2024
Dubai Tennis Championships; Dubai, United Arab Emirates; ATP 500; Hard, outdoor 26 February – 2 March 2024	8 / 477	1R	(Kazakhstan) Alexander Shevchenko	47	Win	6–3, 7–5
Dubai Tennis Championships; Dubai, United Arab Emirates; ATP 500; Hard, outdoor 26 February – 2 March 2024	9 / 478	2R	(Italy) Lorenzo Sonego	48	Win	3–6, 6–3, 6–3
Dubai Tennis Championships; Dubai, United Arab Emirates; ATP 500; Hard, outdoor 26 February – 2 March 2024	10 / 479	QF	(Spain) Alejandro Davidovich Fokina (8)	24	Win	6–2, 6–3
Dubai Tennis Championships; Dubai, United Arab Emirates; ATP 500; Hard, outdoor 26 February – 2 March 2024	11 / 480	SF	(France) Ugo Humbert (5)	18	Loss	5–7, 3–6
Indian Wells Open; Indian Wells, United States; ATP 1000; Hard, outdoor 6 – 17 March 2024
Indian Wells Open; Indian Wells, United States; ATP 1000; Hard, outdoor 6 – 17 March 2024	–	1R	Bye			
Indian Wells Open; Indian Wells, United States; ATP 1000; Hard, outdoor 6 – 17 March 2024	12 / 481	2R	(Spain) Roberto Carballés Baena	64	Win	6–2, 6–3
Indian Wells Open; Indian Wells, United States; ATP 1000; Hard, outdoor 6 – 17 March 2024	13 / 482	3R	(United States) Sebastian Korda (29)	29	Win	6–4, 5–7, 6–3
Indian Wells Open; Indian Wells, United States; ATP 1000; Hard, outdoor 6 – 17 March 2024	14 / 483	4R	(Bulgaria) Grigor Dimitrov (13)	13	Win	6–4, 6–4
Indian Wells Open; Indian Wells, United States; ATP 1000; Hard, outdoor 6 – 17 March 2024	15 / 484	QF	(Denmark) Holger Rune (7)	7	Win	7–5, 6–4
Indian Wells Open; Indian Wells, United States; ATP 1000; Hard, outdoor 6 – 17 March 2024	16 / 485	SF	(United States) Tommy Paul (17)	17	Win	1–6, 7–6^{(7–3)}, 6–2
Indian Wells Open; Indian Wells, United States; ATP 1000; Hard, outdoor 6 – 17 March 2024	17 / 486	F	(Spain) Carlos Alcaraz (2)	2	Loss	6–7^{(5–7)}, 1–6
Miami Open; Miami Gardens, United States; ATP 1000; Hard, outdoor 20 – 31 March 2024
Miami Open; Miami Gardens, United States; ATP 1000; Hard, outdoor 20 – 31 March 2024	–	1R	Bye			
Miami Open; Miami Gardens, United States; ATP 1000; Hard, outdoor 20 – 31 March 2024	18 / 487	2R	(Hungary) Márton Fucsovics	86	Win	6–4, 6–2
Miami Open; Miami Gardens, United States; ATP 1000; Hard, outdoor 20 – 31 March 2024	19 / 488	3R	(United Kingdom) Cameron Norrie (30)	31	Win	7–5, 6–1
Miami Open; Miami Gardens, United States; ATP 1000; Hard, outdoor 20 – 31 March 2024	20 / 489	4R	(Germany) Dominik Koepfer	50	Win	7–6^{(7–5)}, 6–0
Miami Open; Miami Gardens, United States; ATP 1000; Hard, outdoor 20 – 31 March 2024	21 / 490	QF	(Chile) Nicolás Jarry (22)	23	Win	6–2, 7–6^{(9–7)}
Miami Open; Miami Gardens, United States; ATP 1000; Hard, outdoor 20 – 31 March 2024	22 / 491	SF	(Italy) Jannik Sinner (2)	3	Loss	1–6, 2–6
Monte-Carlo Masters; Roquebrune-Cap-Martin, France; ATP 1000; Clay, outdoor 7 – 14 April 2024
Monte-Carlo Masters; Roquebrune-Cap-Martin, France; ATP 1000; Clay, outdoor 7 – 14 April 2024	–	1R	Bye			
Monte-Carlo Masters; Roquebrune-Cap-Martin, France; ATP 1000; Clay, outdoor 7 – 14 April 2024	23 / 492	2R	(France) Gaël Monfils (WC)	40	Win	6–2, 6–4
Monte-Carlo Masters; Roquebrune-Cap-Martin, France; ATP 1000; Clay, outdoor 7 – 14 April 2024	24 / 493	3R	Karen Khachanov (15)	17	Loss	3–6, 5–7
Madrid Open; Madrid, Spain; ATP 1000; Clay, outdoor 24 April – 5 May 2024
Madrid Open; Madrid, Spain; ATP 1000; Clay, outdoor 24 April – 5 May 2024	–	1R	Bye			
Madrid Open; Madrid, Spain; ATP 1000; Clay, outdoor 24 April – 5 May 2024	25 / 494	2R	(Italy) Matteo Arnaldi	36	Win	2–6, 6–4, 6–4
Madrid Open; Madrid, Spain; ATP 1000; Clay, outdoor 24 April – 5 May 2024	26 / 495	3R	(United States) Sebastian Korda (25)	26	Win	5–7, 7–6^{(7–4)}, 6–3
Madrid Open; Madrid, Spain; ATP 1000; Clay, outdoor 24 April – 5 May 2024	27 / 496	4R	(Kazakhstan) Alexander Bublik (17)	18	Win	7–6^{(7–3)}, 6–4
Madrid Open; Madrid, Spain; ATP 1000; Clay, outdoor 24 April – 5 May 2024	28 / 497	QF	(Czech Republic) Jiří Lehečka (30)	31	Loss	4–6, 0–0 Ret.
Italian Open; Rome, Italy; ATP 1000; Clay, outdoor 8 – 19 May 2024
Italian Open; Rome, Italy; ATP 1000; Clay, outdoor 8 – 19 May 2024	–	1R	Bye			
Italian Open; Rome, Italy; ATP 1000; Clay, outdoor 8 – 19 May 2024	29 / 498	2R	(United Kingdom) Jack Draper	40	Win	7–5, 6–4
Italian Open; Rome, Italy; ATP 1000; Clay, outdoor 8 – 19 May 2024	30 / 499	3R	(Serbia) Hamad Medjedovic (Q)	121	Win	7–6^{(7–5)}, 2–6, 7–5
Italian Open; Rome, Italy; ATP 1000; Clay, outdoor 8 – 19 May 2024	31 / 500	4R	(United States) Tommy Paul	16	Loss	1–6, 4–6
French Open; Paris, France; Grand Slam tournament Clay, outdoor 26 May – 9 June 2024
French Open; Paris, France; Grand Slam tournament Clay, outdoor 26 May – 9 June 2024	32 / 501	1R	(Germany) Dominik Koepfer	65	Win	6–3, 6–4, 5–7, 6–3
French Open; Paris, France; Grand Slam tournament Clay, outdoor 26 May – 9 June 2024	33 / 502	2R	(Serbia) Miomir Kecmanović	57	Win	6–1, 5–0 Ret.
French Open; Paris, France; Grand Slam tournament Clay, outdoor 26 May – 9 June 2024	34 / 503	3R	(Czech Republic) Tomáš Macháč	34	Win	7–6^{(7–4)}, 7–5, 1–6, 6–4
French Open; Paris, France; Grand Slam tournament Clay, outdoor 26 May – 9 June 2024	35 / 504	4R	(Australia) Alex de Minaur (11)	11	Loss	6–4, 2–6, 1–6, 3–6
Halle Open; Halle, Germany; ATP 500; Grass, outdoor 17 – 23 June 2024
Halle Open; Halle, Germany; ATP 500; Grass, outdoor 17 – 23 June 2024	36 / 505	1R	(Portugal) Nuno Borges	51	Win	7–6^{(7–4)}, 6–4
Halle Open; Halle, Germany; ATP 500; Grass, outdoor 17 – 23 June 2024	37 / 506	2R	(China) Zhang Zhizhen	42	Loss	3–6, 6–2, 6–7^{(5–7)}
Wimbledon; London, United Kingdom; Grand Slam tournament Grass, outdoor 1 – 14 July 2024
Wimbledon; London, United Kingdom; Grand Slam tournament Grass, outdoor 1 – 14 July 2024	38 / 507	1R	(United States) Aleksandar Kovacevic	88	Win	6–3, 6–4, 6–2
Wimbledon; London, United Kingdom; Grand Slam tournament Grass, outdoor 1 – 14 July 2024	39 / 508	2R	(France) Alexandre Müller	102	Win	6–7^{(5–7)}, 7–6^{(7–4)}, 6–4, 7–5
Wimbledon; London, United Kingdom; Grand Slam tournament Grass, outdoor 1 – 14 July 2024	40 / 509	3R	(Germany) Jan-Lennard Struff	41	Win	6–1, 6–3, 4–6, 7–6^{(7–3)}
Wimbledon; London, United Kingdom; Grand Slam tournament Grass, outdoor 1 – 14 July 2024	41 / 510	4R	(Bulgaria) Grigor Dimitrov (10)	10	Win	5–3 Ret.
Wimbledon; London, United Kingdom; Grand Slam tournament Grass, outdoor 1 – 14 July 2024	42 / 511	QF	(Italy) Jannik Sinner (1)	1	Win	6–7^{(7–9)}, 6–4, 7–6^{(7–4)}, 2–6, 6–3
Wimbledon; London, United Kingdom; Grand Slam tournament Grass, outdoor 1 – 14 July 2024	43 / 512	SF	(Spain) Carlos Alcaraz (3)	3	Loss	7–6^{(7–1)}, 3–6, 4–6, 4–6
Summer Olympics; Paris, France; Olympics; Clay, outdoor 27 July – 4 August 2024
Summer Olympics; Paris, France; Olympics; Clay, outdoor 27 July – 4 August 2024	44 / 513	1R	(Australia) Rinky Hijikata	80	Win	6–2, 6–1
Summer Olympics; Paris, France; Olympics; Clay, outdoor 27 July – 4 August 2024	45 / 514	2R	(Austria) Sebastian Ofner	55	Win	6–2, 6–2
Summer Olympics; Paris, France; Olympics; Clay, outdoor 27 July – 4 August 2024	46 / 515	3R	(Canada) Félix Auger-Aliassime (13)	19	Loss	3–6, 6–7^{(5–7)}
Canadian Open; Montreal, Canada; ATP 1000; Hard, outdoor 6 – 12 August 2024
Canadian Open; Montreal, Canada; ATP 1000; Hard, outdoor 6 – 12 August 2024	–	1R	Bye			
Canadian Open; Montreal, Canada; ATP 1000; Hard, outdoor 6 – 12 August 2024	47 / 516	2R	(Spain) Alejandro Davidovich Fokina	42	Loss	4–6, 6–1, 2–6
Cincinnati Open; Mason, United States; ATP 1000; Hard, outdoor 12 – 19 August 2024
Cincinnati Open; Mason, United States; ATP 1000; Hard, outdoor 12 – 19 August 2024	–	1R	Bye			
Cincinnati Open; Mason, United States; ATP 1000; Hard, outdoor 12 – 19 August 2024	48 / 517	2R	(Czech Republic) Jiří Lehečka	35	Loss	6–7^{(2–7)}, 4–6
US Open; New York City, United States; Grand Slam tournament Hard, outdoor 26 August – 8 September 2024
US Open; New York City, United States; Grand Slam tournament Hard, outdoor 26 August – 8 September 2024	49 / 518	1R	(Serbia) Dušan Lajović	66	Win	6–3, 3–6, 6–3, 6–1
US Open; New York City, United States; Grand Slam tournament Hard, outdoor 26 August – 8 September 2024	50 / 519	2R	(Hungary) Fábián Marozsán	51	Win	6–3, 6–2, 7–6^{(7–5)}
US Open; New York City, United States; Grand Slam tournament Hard, outdoor 26 August – 8 September 2024	51 / 520	3R	(Italy) Flavio Cobolli (31)	31	Win	6–3, 6–4, 6–3
US Open; New York City, United States; Grand Slam tournament Hard, outdoor 26 August – 8 September 2024	52 / 521	4R	(Portugal) Nuno Borges	34	Win	6–0, 6–1, 6–3
US Open; New York City, United States; Grand Slam tournament Hard, outdoor 26 August – 8 September 2024	53 / 522	QF	(Italy) Jannik Sinner (1)	1	Loss	2–6, 6–1, 1–6, 4–6
Laver Cup; Berlin, Germany; Laver Cup; Hard, indoor 20 – 22 September 2024
Laver Cup; Berlin, Germany; Laver Cup; Hard, indoor 20 – 22 September 2024	54 / 523	Day 2	(United States) Frances Tiafoe	16	Loss	6–3, 4–6, [5–10]
Laver Cup; Berlin, Germany; Laver Cup; Hard, indoor 20 – 22 September 2024	55 / 524	Day 3	(United States) Ben Shelton	17	Loss	7–6^{(8–6)}, 5–7, [7–10]
China Open; Beijing, China; ATP 500; Hard, outdoor 26 September – 2 October 2024
China Open; Beijing, China; ATP 500; Hard, outdoor 26 September – 2 October 2024	56 / 525	1R	(France) Gaël Monfils	46	Win	6–3, 6–4
China Open; Beijing, China; ATP 500; Hard, outdoor 26 September – 2 October 2024	57 / 526	2R	(France) Adrian Mannarino	44	Win	7–6^{(8–6)}, 6–2
China Open; Beijing, China; ATP 500; Hard, outdoor 26 September – 2 October 2024	58 / 527	QF	(Italy) Flavio Cobolli	32	Win	6–2, 6–4
China Open; Beijing, China; ATP 500; Hard, outdoor 26 September – 2 October 2024	59 / 528	SF	(Spain) Carlos Alcaraz (2)	3	Loss	5–7, 3–6
Shanghai Masters; Shanghai, China; ATP 1000; Hard, outdoor 2 – 13 October 2024
Shanghai Masters; Shanghai, China; ATP 1000; Hard, outdoor 2 – 13 October 2024	–	1R	Bye			
Shanghai Masters; Shanghai, China; ATP 1000; Hard, outdoor 2 – 13 October 2024	60 / 529	2R	(Brazil) Thiago Seyboth Wild	88	Win	7–5, 7–5
Shanghai Masters; Shanghai, China; ATP 1000; Hard, outdoor 2 – 13 October 2024	61 / 530	3R	(Italy) Matteo Arnaldi (29)	36	Win	5–7, 6–4, 6–4
Shanghai Masters; Shanghai, China; ATP 1000; Hard, outdoor 2 – 13 October 2024	62 / 531	4R	(Greece) Stefanos Tsitsipas (10)	12	Win	7–6^{(7–3)}, 6–3
Shanghai Masters; Shanghai, China; ATP 1000; Hard, outdoor 2 – 13 October 2024	63 / 532	QF	(Italy) Jannik Sinner (1)	1	Loss	1–6, 4–6
Paris Masters; Paris, France; ATP 1000; Hard, indoor 28 October – 3 November 2024
Paris Masters; Paris, France; ATP 1000; Hard, indoor 28 October – 3 November 2024	–	1R	Bye			
Paris Masters; Paris, France; ATP 1000; Hard, indoor 28 October – 3 November 2024	64 / 533	2R	(Australia) Alexei Popyrin	24	Loss	4–6, 6–2, 6–7^{(4–7)}
ATP Finals; Turin, Italy; ATP Finals; Hard, indoor 10 – 17 November 2024
ATP Finals; Turin, Italy; ATP Finals; Hard, indoor 10 – 17 November 2024	65 / 534	RR	(United States) Taylor Fritz (5)	5	Loss	4–6, 3–6
ATP Finals; Turin, Italy; ATP Finals; Hard, indoor 10 – 17 November 2024	66 / 535	RR	(Australia) Alex de Minaur (7)	9	Win	6–2, 6–4
ATP Finals; Turin, Italy; ATP Finals; Hard, indoor 10 – 17 November 2024	67 / 536	RR	(Italy) Jannik Sinner (1)	1	Loss	3–6, 4–6

=== Doubles matches ===
Tournament	Match	Round	Opponent (seed or key)	Rank	Result	Score
Monte-Carlo Masters; Roquebrune-Cap-Martin, France; ATP 1000; Clay, outdoor 7 – 14 April 2024; Partner: Roman Safiullin
Monte-Carlo Masters; Roquebrune-Cap-Martin, France; ATP 1000; Clay, outdoor 7 – 14 April 2024; Partner: Roman Safiullin	1 / 40	1R	Karen Khachanov / Andrey Rublev	56 / 48	Loss	6–7^{(1–7)}, 2–6
Madrid Open; Madrid, Spain; ATP 1000; Clay, outdoor 24 April – 5 May 2024; Partner: (United States) Tommy Paul
Madrid Open; Madrid, Spain; ATP 1000; Clay, outdoor 24 April – 5 May 2024; Partner: (United States) Tommy Paul	2 / 41	1R	(Italy) Simone Bolelli / (Italy) Andrea Vavassori (12)	24 / 28	Loss	2–6, 6–7^{(5–7)}
Halle Open; Halle, Germany; ATP 500; Grass, outdoor 17 – 23 June 2024; Partner: Roman Safiullin
Halle Open; Halle, Germany; ATP 500; Grass, outdoor 17 – 23 June 2024; Partner: Roman Safiullin	N/A	Q1	(India) Yuki Bhambri / (France) Albano Olivetti (1/Alt)	51 / 46	Loss	6–7^{(4–7)}, 4–6
Summer Olympics; Paris, France; Olympics; Clay, outdoor 27 July – 4 August 2024; Partner: Roman Safiullin
Summer Olympics; Paris, France; Olympics; Clay, outdoor 27 July – 4 August 2024; Partner: Roman Safiullin	3 / 42	1R	(Germany) Kevin Krawietz / (Germany) Tim Pütz (2)	21 / 21	Loss	4–6, 4–6
Canadian Open; Montreal, Canada; ATP 1000; Hard, outdoor 6 – 12 August 2024; Partner: Roman Safiullin
Canadian Open; Montreal, Canada; ATP 1000; Hard, outdoor 6 – 12 August 2024; Partner: Roman Safiullin	4 / 43	1R	(Croatia) Ivan Dodig / (Netherlands) Jean-Julien Rojer (11)	17 / 29	Win	6–4, 6–3
Canadian Open; Montreal, Canada; ATP 1000; Hard, outdoor 6 – 12 August 2024; Partner: Roman Safiullin	5 / 44	2R	(Mexico) Santiago González / (France) Édouard Roger-Vasselin (6)	15 / 11	Win	3–6, 6–1, [10–7]
Canadian Open; Montreal, Canada; ATP 1000; Hard, outdoor 6 – 12 August 2024; Partner: Roman Safiullin	6 / 45	QF	(United States) Rajeev Ram / (United Kingdom) Joe Salisbury (3)	5 / 6	Loss	4–6, 4–6

== Exhibition matches ==
=== Singles ===
Tournament	Match	Round	Opponent (seed or key)	Rank	Result	Score
2023 World Tennis League; Abu Dhabi, United Arab Emirates Hard, outdoor 21 – 24 December 2023
2023 World Tennis League; Abu Dhabi, United Arab Emirates Hard, outdoor 21 – 24 December 2023	1	PO	(Poland) Hubert Hurkacz	9	Loss	6–7^{(4–7)}
2023 World Tennis League; Abu Dhabi, United Arab Emirates Hard, outdoor 21 – 24 December 2023	2	PO	(Poland) Hubert Hurkacz	9	Win	[10–4]
2023 World Tennis League; Abu Dhabi, United Arab Emirates Hard, outdoor 21 – 24 December 2023	3	PO	(United States) Taylor Fritz	10	Loss	3–6
2023 World Tennis League; Abu Dhabi, United Arab Emirates Hard, outdoor 21 – 24 December 2023	4	PO	(United States) Taylor Fritz	10	Win	1–0
Giorgio Armani Tennis Classic; London, United Kingdom Grass, outdoor 28 June 2024
Giorgio Armani Tennis Classic; London, United Kingdom Grass, outdoor 28 June 2024	5	PO	(Serbia) Novak Djokovic	2	Loss	3–6, 4–6
6 Kings Slam; Riyadh, Saudi Arabia Hard, indoor 16 – 19 October 2024
6 Kings Slam; Riyadh, Saudi Arabia Hard, indoor 16 – 19 October 2024	6	QF	(Italy) Jannik Sinner	1	Loss	0–6, 3–6

=== Doubles matches ===
Tournament	Match	Round	Opponents (seed or key)	Ranks	Result	Score
2023 World Tennis League; Abu Dhabi, United Arab Emirates Hard, outdoor 21 – 24 December 2023; Partner: Andrey Rublev
2023 World Tennis League; Abu Dhabi, United Arab Emirates Hard, outdoor 21 – 24 December 2023; Partner: Andrey Rublev	1	PO	(Bulgaria) Grigor Dimitrov / (Greece) Stefanos Tsitsipas	584 / 113	Win	7–6^{(7–3)}
2023 World Tennis League; Abu Dhabi, United Arab Emirates Hard, outdoor 21 – 24 December 2023; Partner: Andrey Rublev	2	PO	(Poland) Hubert Hurkacz / (Norway) Casper Ruud	195 / 581	Win	7–6^{(7–1)}
2023 World Tennis League; Abu Dhabi, United Arab Emirates Hard, outdoor 21 – 24 December 2023; Partner: Andrey Rublev	3	PO	(United States) Taylor Fritz / (India) Sumit Nagal	155 / 603	Win	6–4
2023 World Tennis League; Abu Dhabi, United Arab Emirates Hard, outdoor 21 – 24 December 2023; Partner: Andrey Rublev	4	W	(Bulgaria) Grigor Dimitrov / (South Africa) Lloyd Harris	584 / 123	Win	6–3

=== Mixed doubles matches ===
Tournament	Match	Round	Opponents (seed or key)	Ranks	Result	Score
2023 World Tennis League; Abu Dhabi, United Arab Emirates Hard, outdoor 21 – 24 December 2023; Partner: Mirra Andreeva
2023 World Tennis League; Abu Dhabi, United Arab Emirates Hard, outdoor 21 – 24 December 2023; Partner: Mirra Andreeva	1	F	(Spain) Paula Badosa / (Greece) Stefanos Tsitsipas	355 / 113	Loss	6–7^{(5–7)}

== Schedule ==
Per Daniil Medvedev, this is his current 2024 schedule (subject to change).

=== Singles schedule ===
Date	Tournament	Location	Tier	Surface	Prev. result	Prev. points	New points	Result
8 January 2024– 14 January 2024	Adelaide International	Adelaide (AUS)	250 Series	Hard	SF	90	0	Withdrew
14 January 2024– 28 January 2024	Australian Open	Melbourne (AUS)	Grand Slam	Hard	3R	90	1300	Final (lost to Jannik Sinner, 6–3, 6–3, 4–6, 4–6, 3–6)
12 February 2024– 18 February 2024	Rotterdam Open	Rotterdam (NED)	500 Series	Hard (i)	W	500	0	Withdrew
19 February 2024– 24 February 2024	Qatar Open	Doha (QAT)	250 Series	Hard	W	250	0	Withdrew
26 February 2024– 2 March 2024	Dubai Tennis Championships	Dubai (UAE)	500 Series	Hard	W	500	200	Semifinals (lost to Ugo Humbert, 5–7, 3–6)
6 March 2024– 17 March 2024	Indian Wells Open	Indian Wells (USA)	Masters 1000	Hard	F	600	650	Final (lost to Carlos Alcaraz, 6–7^{(5–7)}, 1–6)
20 March 2024– 31 March 2024	Miami Open	Miami (USA)	Masters 1000	Hard	W	1000	400	Semifinals (lost to Jannik Sinner, 1–6, 2–6)
7 April 2024– 14 April 2024	Monte-Carlo Masters	Roquebrune-Cap-Martin (FRA)	Masters 1000	Clay	QF	180	100	Third round (lost to Karen Khachanov, 3–6, 5–7)
24 April 2024– 5 May 2024	Madrid Open	Madrid (ESP)	Masters 1000	Clay	4R	90	200	Quarterfinals (lost to Jiří Lehečka, 4–6, 0–0 Ret.)
8 May 2024– 19 May 2024	Italian Open	Rome (ITA)	Masters 1000	Clay	W	1000	100	Fourth round (lost to Tommy Paul 1–6, 4–6)
26 May 2024– 9 June 2024	French Open	Paris (FRA)	Grand Slam	Clay	1R	10	200	Fourth round (lost to Alex de Minaur 6–4, 2–6, 1–6, 3–6)
10 June 2024– 16 June 2024	Libéma Open	's-Hertogenbosch (NED)	250 series	Grass	2R	0	0	Withdrew
17 June 2024– 23 June 2024	Halle Open	Halle (GER)	500 Series	Grass	QF	90	50	Second round (lost to Zhang Zhizhen 3–6, 6–2, 6–7^{(5–7)})
1 July 2024– 14 July 2024	Wimbledon	London (GBR)	Grand Slam	Grass	SF	720	800	Semifinals (lost to Carlos Alcaraz 7–6^{(7–1)}, 3–6, 4–6, 4–6
27 July 2024– 4 August 2024	Summer Olympics	Paris (FRA)	Olympic Games	Clay	NH	N/A	N/A	Third round (lost to Félix Auger-Aliassime 3–6, 6–7^{(5–7)})
6 August 2024– 12 August 2024	Canadian Open	Montréal (CAN)	Masters 1000	Hard	QF	180	10	Second round (lost to Alejandro Davidovich Fokina, 4–6, 6–1, 2–6)
12 August 2024– 19 August 2024	Cincinnati Open	Cincinnati (USA)	Masters 1000	Hard	3R	90	10	Second round (lost to Jiří Lehečka, 6–7^{(2–7)}, 4–6)
26 August 2024– 8 September 2024	US Open	New York (USA)	Grand Slam	Hard	F	1200	400	Quarterfinals (lost to Jannik Sinner, 2–6, 6–1, 1–6, 4–6)
26 September 2024– 2 October 2024	China Open	Beijing (CHN)	500 Series	Hard	F	300	200	Semifinals (lost to Carlos Alcaraz 5–7, 3–6
2 October 2024– 13 October 2024	Shanghai Masters	Shanghai (CHN)	Masters 1000	Hard	3R	0	200	Quarterfinals (lost to Jannik Sinner, 1–6, 4–6)
21 October 2024– 27 October 2024	Vienna Open	Vienna (AUT)	500 Series	Hard (i)	F	300	0	Withdrew
28 October 2024– 3 November 2024	Paris Masters	Paris (FRA)	Masters 1000	Hard (i)	2R	10	10	Second round (lost to Alexei Popyrin, 4–6, 6–2, 6–7^{(4–7)})
10 November 2024– 17 November 2024	ATP Finals	Turin (ITA)	Tour Finals	Hard (i)	SF	400	200	Round robin (1 win – 2 losses)
Total year-end points (as of ATP Finals)						7600	5030	▼2570
Total year-end points						7600		difference
Source: Rankings breakdown

== Yearly records ==
=== Head-to-head matchups ===
Daniil Medvedev has a 46–21 (68.66%) ATP match win–loss record in the 2024 season. His record against players who were part of the ATP rankings Top Ten at the time of their meetings is 6–9 (40%). Bold indicates player was ranked top 10 at the time of at least one meeting. The following list is ordered by number of wins:

- (Portugal) Nuno Borges 3–0
- (Italy) Matteo Arnaldi 2–0
- (Italy) Flavio Cobolli 2–0
- **(Bulgaria) Grigor Dimitrov** 2–0
- (Germany) Dominik Koepfer 2–0
- (United States) Sebastian Korda 2–0
- (France) Gaël Monfils 2–0
- (France) Térence Atmane 1–0
- (Kazakhstan) Alexander Bublik 1–0
- (Spain) Roberto Carballés Baena 1–0
- (United Kingdom) Jack Draper 1–0
- (Hungary) Márton Fucsovics 1–0
- (Australia) Rinky Hijikata 1–0
- **(Poland) Hubert Hurkacz** 1–0
- (Chile) Nicolás Jarry 1–0
- (Serbia) Miomir Kecmanović 1–0
- (United States) Aleksandar Kovacevic 1–0
- (Serbia) Dušan Lajović 1–0
- (Czech Republic) Tomáš Macháč 1–0
- (France) Adrian Mannarino 1–0
- (Hungary) Fábián Marozsán 1–0
- (Serbia) Hamad Medjedovic 1–0
- (France) Alexandre Müller 1–0
- (United Kingdom) Cameron Norrie 1–0
- (Austria) Sebastian Ofner 1–0
- **(Denmark) Holger Rune** 1–0
- (Finland) Emil Ruusuvuori 1–0
- (Brazil) Thiago Seyboth Wild 1–0
- (Kazakhstan) Alexander Shevchenko 1–0
- (Italy) Lorenzo Sonego 1–0
- (Germany) Jan-Lennard Struff 1–0
- (Greece) Stefanos Tsitsipas 1–0
- **(Germany) Alexander Zverev** 1–0
- (Canada) Félix Auger-Aliassime 1–1
- (Spain) Alejandro Davidovich Fokina 1–1
- **(Australia) Alex de Minaur** 1–1
- (United States) Tommy Paul 1–1
- **(United States) Taylor Fritz** 0–1
- (France) Ugo Humbert 0–1
- Karen Khachanov 0–1
- (Australia) Alexei Popyrin 0–1
- (United States) Ben Shelton 0–1
- (United States) Frances Tiafoe 0–1
- (China) Zhang Zhizhen 0–1
- (Czech Republic) Jiří Lehečka 0–2
- **(Spain) Carlos Alcaraz** 0–3
- **(Italy) Jannik Sinner** 1–5

* Statistics correct as of 15 November 2024.

=== Top 10 record (6–9) ===
Category Grand Slam (4–3) ATP Finals (1–2) Masters 1000 (1–3) 500 Series (0–1) 250 Series (0–0)	Wins by surface Hard (4–8) Clay (0–0) Grass (2–1)	Wins by setting Outdoor (5–7) Indoor (1–2)

Result	W–L	Player	Rk	Event	Surface	Rd	Score	Rk	Ref
Win	1–0	(Poland) Hubert Hurkacz	9	Australian Open, Australia	Hard	QF	7–6^{(7–4)}, 2–6, 6–3, 5–7, 6–4	3	
Win	2–0	(Germany) Alexander Zverev	6	Australian Open, Australia	Hard	SF	5–7, 3–6, 7–6^{(7–4)}, 7–6^{(7–5)}, 6–3	3	
Loss	2–1	(Italy) Jannik Sinner	4	Australian Open, Australia	Hard	F	6–3, 6–3, 4–6, 4–6, 3–6	3	
Win	3–1	(Denmark) Holger Rune	7	Indian Wells Open, United States	Hard	QF	7–5, 6–4	4	
Loss	3–2	(Spain) Carlos Alcaraz	2	Indian Wells Open, United States	Hard	F	6–7^{(5–7)}, 1–6	4	
Loss	3–3	(Italy) Jannik Sinner	3	Miami Open, United States	Hard	SF	1–6, 2–6	4	
Win	4–3	(Bulgaria) Grigor Dimitrov	10	Wimbledon, United Kingdom	Grass	4R	5–3, ret.	5	
Win	5–3	(Italy) Jannik Sinner	**1**	Wimbledon, United Kingdom	Grass	QF	6–7^{(7–9)}, 6–4, 7–6^{(7–4)}, 2–6, 6–3	5	
Loss	5–4	(Spain) Carlos Alcaraz	3	Wimbledon, United Kingdom	Grass	SF	7–6^{(7–1)}, 3–6, 4–6, 4–6	5	
Loss	5–5	(Italy) Jannik Sinner	**1**	US Open, United States	Hard	QF	2–6, 6–1, 1–6, 4–6	5	
Loss	5–6	(Spain) Carlos Alcaraz	3	China Open, China	Hard	SF	5–7, 3–6	5	
Loss	5–7	(Italy) Jannik Sinner	**1**	Shanghai Masters, China	Hard	QF	1–6, 4–6	5	
Loss	5–8	(United States) Taylor Fritz	5	ATP Finals, Italy	Hard (i)	RR	4–6, 3–6	4	
Win	6–8	(Australia) Alex de Minaur	9	ATP Finals, Italy	Hard (i)	RR	6–2, 6–4	4	
Loss	6–9	(Italy) Jannik Sinner	**1**	ATP Finals, Italy	Hard (i)	RR	3–6, 4–6	4	

- Key: (Rk) first use, opponent rank; (Rd) round; (Rk) 2nd use, player rank; (Ref) reference; (F) final; (SF) semifinal; (QF) quarterfinal; (#R) rounds 4, 3, 2, 1; (RR) round-robin stage; (Q#) qualifying rounds or stages (3), 2, 1.

=== Finals ===
==== Singles: 2 (2 runners-up) ====
Category Grand Slam (0–1) ATP Finals (0–0) ATP Masters 1000 (0–1) ATP 500 Series (0–0) ATP 250 Series (0–0)	Titles by surface Hard (0–2) Clay (0–0) Grass (0–0)	Titles by setting Outdoor (0–2) Indoor (0–0)

Result	W–L	Date	Tournament	Tier	Surface	Opponent	Score
Loss	0–1	Jan 2024	Australian Open, Australia	Grand Slam	Hard	(Italy) Jannik Sinner	6–3, 6–3, 4–6, 4–6, 3–6
Loss	0–2	Mar 2024	Indian Wells Open, United States	Masters 1000	Hard	(Spain) Carlos Alcaraz	6–7^{(5–7)}, 1–6

=== Earnings ===
**Singles**
Event	Prize money	Year-to-date
Australian Open	A$1,725,000	$1,153,162
Dubai Tennis Championships	$157,755	$1,310,917
Indian Wells Open	$585,000	$1,895,917
Miami Open	$325,000	$2,220,917
Monte-Carlo Masters	€80,065	$2,307,667
Madrid Open	€161,995	$2,480,289
Italian Open	€88,440	$2,575,468
French Open	€250,000	$2,847,193
Halle Open	€32,990	$2,882,489
Wimbledon Championships	£715,000	$3,786,607
Canadian Open	$49,030	$3,835,637
Cincinnati Open	$49,030	$3,884,667
US Open	$530,000	$4,414,667
Shanghai Masters	$185,000	$4,599,667
Paris Masters	€42,935	$4,845,510
ATP Finals	$727,500	$5,573,010
Bonus Pool ATP Ranking: **#5**	$903,904	$6,476,914
		$6,476,914
**Doubles**
Event	Prize money	Year-to-date
Monte-Carlo Masters	€6,965	$7,546
Madrid Open	€8,160	$16,241
Canadian Open	$26,505	$42,746
		$42,746
**Total**
		**$6,519,660**

Figures in United States dollars (USD) unless noted.

- source：2024 Singles Activity
- source：2024 Doubles Activity

== See also ==
- 2024 ATP Tour
- 2024 Novak Djokovic tennis season
- 2024 Carlos Alcaraz tennis season
- 2024 Jannik Sinner tennis season
