= 2024 ABN AMRO Open – Doubles =

Doubles
- 2024 ABN AMRO Open

Final
- Champions: (Netherlands) Wesley Koolhof (Croatia) Nikola Mektić
- Runners-up: (Netherlands) Robin Haase (Netherlands) Botic van de Zandschulp
- Score: 6–3, 7–5

Details
- Draw: 16 (1Q, 2WC)
- Seeds: 4

Events
Singles	Doubles
← 2023 ·	ABN AMRO Open	· 2025 →

Wesley Koolhof and Nikola Mektić won the doubles title at the 2024 ABN AMRO Open, defeating Robin Haase and Botic van de Zandschulp in the final, 6–3, 7–5.

Ivan Dodig and Austin Krajicek were the defending champions, but lost in the semifinals to Koolhof and Mektić.

== Seeds ==
1. (Croatia) Ivan Dodig / (United States) Austin Krajicek (semifinals)
2. (Germany) Kevin Krawietz / (Germany) Tim Pütz (first round)
3. (United States) Nathaniel Lammons / (United States) Jackson Withrow (semifinals)
4. (France) Nicolas Mahut / (France) Édouard Roger-Vasselin (first round)

== Draw ==
=== Key ===
- Q = Qualifier
- WC = Wild card
- LL = Lucky loser
- Alt = Alternate
- ITF = ITF entry
- PR = Protected ranking
- SR = Special ranking
- SE = Special exempt
- JE = Junior exempt
- JR = Junior Accelerator Programme entrant
- CO = College Accelerator Programme entrant
- NG = Next Gen Accelerator Program entrant
- w/o = Walkover
- r = Retired
- d = Defaulted

=== Draw ===
First round
1	(Croatia) I Dodig (United States) A Krajicek	6	7^{7}
(Finland) H Heliövaara (Australia) J Peers	4	6^{4}
Q	(Germany) A Mies (Australia) JP Smith	6^{5}	7^{7}	[11]
(United Kingdom) L Glasspool (Netherlands) J-J Rojer	7^{7}	6^{2}	[9]
4	(France) N Mahut (France) É Roger-Vasselin	7^{7}	5	[8]
(Austria) A Erler (Austria) L Miedler	6^{1}	7	[10]
(Netherlands) W Koolhof (Croatia) N Mektić	6	3	[10]
(Uruguay) A Behar (Czech Republic) A Pavlásek	3	6	[8]
(Belgium) S Gillé (Belgium) J Vliegen	1	7^{14}	[10]
WC	(Netherlands) T Griekspoor (Netherlands) B Stevens	6	6^{12}	[7]
(France) A Olivetti (New Zealand) M Venus	3	7^{7}	[6]
3	(United States) N Lammons (United States) J Withrow	6	6^{5}	[10]
(El Salvador) M Arévalo (Croatia) M Pavić	5	6^{8}
(Kazakhstan) A Bublik (Italy) L Musetti	7	7^{10}
WC	(Netherlands) R Haase (Netherlands) B van de Zandschulp	7^{9}	6^{5}	[10]
2	(Germany) K Krawietz (Germany) T Pütz	6^{7}	7^{7}	[5]

Quarterfinals
1	(Croatia) I Dodig (United States) A Krajicek	4	6	[10]
Q	(Germany) A Mies (Australia) JP Smith	6	4	[8]
(Austria) A Erler (Austria) L Miedler	3	6^{5}
(Netherlands) W Koolhof (Croatia) N Mektić	6	7^{7}
(Belgium) S Gillé (Belgium) J Vliegen	6^{6}	7^{16}	[3]
3	(United States) N Lammons (United States) J Withrow	7^{8}	6^{14}	[10]
(Kazakhstan) A Bublik (Italy) L Musetti	4	2
WC	(Netherlands) R Haase (Netherlands) B van de Zandschulp	6	6

Semifinals
1	(Croatia) I Dodig (United States) A Krajicek	5	4
(Netherlands) W Koolhof (Croatia) N Mektić	7	6
3	(United States) N Lammons (United States) J Withrow	4	6	[8]
WC	(Netherlands) R Haase (Netherlands) B van de Zandschulp	6	4	[10]

Final
(Netherlands) W Koolhof (Croatia) N Mektić	6	7
WC	(Netherlands) R Haase (Netherlands) B van de Zandschulp	3	5

== Qualifying ==
=== Seeds ===
1. (Monaco) Romain Arneodo / (Austria) Sam Weissborn (first round)
2. (Germany) Andreas Mies / (Australia) John-Patrick Smith (qualified)

=== Qualifiers ===
1. (Germany) Andreas Mies / (Australia) John-Patrick Smith

=== Qualifying draw ===
First round
1	(Monaco) Romain Arneodo (Austria) Sam Weissborn	4	6	[8]
Alt	(Serbia) Nikola Ćaćić (Ukraine) Denys Molchanov	6	1	[10]
WC	(Netherlands) Sander Arends (Netherlands) Sem Verbeek	6	6^{4}	[11]
2	(Germany) Andreas Mies (Australia) John-Patrick Smith	3	7^{7}	[13]

Qualifying competition
Alt	(Serbia) Nikola Ćaćić (Ukraine) Denys Molchanov	1	0
2	(Germany) Andreas Mies (Australia) John-Patrick Smith	6	6
