= 2024 ABN AMRO Open =

- Date: 12–18 February
- Edition: 51st
- Category: ATP Tour 500
- Draw: 32S / 16D
- Prize money: €2,134,985
- Surface: Hard (indoor)
- Location: Rotterdam, Netherlands
- Venue: Rotterdam Ahoy

Champions

Singles
- (Italy) Jannik Sinner

Doubles
- (Netherlands) Wesley Koolhof / (Croatia) Nikola Mektić
- Rotterdam Open

The 2024 ABN AMRO Open was a men's tennis tournament played on indoor hard courts. It took place at the Rotterdam Ahoy in the Dutch city of Rotterdam, between 12 and 18 February 2024. It was the 51st edition of the Rotterdam Open, and part of the ATP Tour 500 series on the 2024 ATP Tour. The tournament also included a wheelchair tennis singles and doubles draw for both men and women.

== Finals ==
=== Singles ===
- (Italy) Jannik Sinner defeated (Australia) Alex de Minaur, 7–5, 6–4.

=== Doubles ===
- (Netherlands) Wesley Koolhof / (Croatia) Nikola Mektić defeated (Netherlands) Robin Haase / (Netherlands) Botic van de Zandschulp, 6–3, 7–5.

== Point distribution ==
Event	W	F	SF	QF	Round of 16	Round of 32	Q	Q2	Q1
Singles	500	330	200	100	50	0	25	13	0
Doubles	500	300	180	90	0	—N/a	45	25	0

=== Prize money ===
Event	W	F	SF	QF	Round of 16	Round of 32	Q2	Q1
Singles	€399,215	€214,795	€114,490	€58,495	€31,225	€16,655	€8,535	€4,790
Doubles*	€131,140	€69,940	€35,390	€17,690	€9,160	—N/a	—N/a	—N/a
Doubles prize money per team

== Singles main-draw entrants ==
=== Seeds ===
Country	Player	Ranking^{1}	Seed
ITA	Jannik Sinner	4	1
	Andrey Rublev	5	2
DEN	Holger Rune	7	3
POL	Hubert Hurkacz	8	4
AUS	Alex de Minaur	11	5
BUL	Grigor Dimitrov	13	6
FRA	Ugo Humbert	21	7
KAZ	Alexander Bublik	23	8

- ^{1} Rankings are as of 5 February 2024.

=== Other entrants ===
The following players received wildcards into the main draw:

- (Netherlands) Jesper de Jong
- (France) Gaël Monfils
- (Croatia) Dino Prižmić

The following player received entry using a protected ranking:

- (Canada) Milos Raonic

The following players received entry from the qualifying draw:

- (Belgium) Zizou Bergs
- (United States) Maxime Cressy
- (Belgium) David Goffin
- (Canada) Denis Shapovalov

=== Withdrawals ===
- Daniil Medvedev → replaced by (Netherlands) Botic van de Zandschulp

== Doubles main-draw entrants ==
=== Seeds ===
Country	Player	Country	Player	Rank^{1}	Seed
CRO	Ivan Dodig	USA	Austin Krajicek	7	1
GER	Kevin Krawietz	GER	Tim Pütz	31	2
USA	Nathaniel Lammons	USA	Jackson Withrow	43	3
FRA	Nicolas Mahut	FRA	Édouard Roger-Vasselin	45	4

- ^{1} Rankings as of 5 February 2024.

=== Other entrants ===
The following pairs received wildcards into the doubles main draw:

- (Netherlands) Tallon Griekspoor / (Netherlands) Bart Stevens
- (Netherlands) Robin Haase / (Netherlands) Botic van de Zandschulp

The following pair received entry from the qualifying draw:

- (Germany) Andreas Mies / (Australia) John-Patrick Smith

=== Withdrawals ===
- (India) Rohan Bopanna / (Australia) Matthew Ebden → replaced by (Uruguay) Ariel Behar / (Czech Republic) Adam Pavlásek
- (United Kingdom) Jamie Murray / (New Zealand) Michael Venus → replaced by (France) Albano Olivetti / (New Zealand) Michael Venus
