= 2024 National Bank Open – Men's doubles =

Men's doubles
- 2024 National Bank Open

Final
- Champions: (Spain) Marcel Granollers (Argentina) Horacio Zeballos
- Runners-up: (United States) Rajeev Ram (United Kingdom) Joe Salisbury
- Score: 6–2, 7–6^{(7–4)}

Details
- Draw: 28
- Seeds: 8

Events
| Singles | men | women |
| Doubles | men | women |
- National Bank Open

Marcel Granollers and Horacio Zeballos defeated Rajeev Ram and Joe Salisbury in the final, 6–2, 7–6^{(7–4)} to win the men's doubles tennis title at the 2024 Canadian Open.

Marcelo Arévalo and Jean-Julien Rojer were the defending champions, but chose not to participate together. Arévalo partnered Mate Pavić, but lost in the semifinals to Granollers and Zeballos. Rojer partnered Ivan Dodig, but lost in the first round to Daniil Medvedev and Roman Safiullin.

Granollers and Zeballos retained the ATP No. 1 doubles ranking by winning their first match. Matthew Ebden was also in contention for the top ranking at the beginning of the tournament.

== Seeds ==
The top four seeds received a bye into the second round.

1. (Spain) Marcel Granollers / (Argentina) Horacio Zeballos (champions)
2. (India) Rohan Bopanna / (Australia) Matthew Ebden (second round)
3. (United States) Rajeev Ram / (United Kingdom) Joe Salisbury (final)
4. (El Salvador) Marcelo Arévalo / (Croatia) Mate Pavić (semifinals)
5. (Italy) Simone Bolelli / (Italy) Andrea Vavassori (quarterfinals)
6. (Mexico) Santiago González / (France) Édouard Roger-Vasselin (second round)
7. (Argentina) Máximo González / (Argentina) Andrés Molteni (first round)
8. (Finland) Harri Heliövaara / (United Kingdom) Henry Patten (first round, retired)
9. (United Kingdom) Neal Skupski / (New Zealand) Michael Venus (second round)
10. (Germany) Kevin Krawietz / (Germany) Tim Pütz (quarterfinals)
11. (Croatia) Ivan Dodig / (Netherlands) Jean-Julien Rojer (first round)
12. (Australia) Max Purcell / (Australia) Jordan Thompson (second round)
13. (United States) Nathaniel Lammons / (United States) Jackson Withrow (first round)
14. (Monaco) Hugo Nys / (Poland) Jan Zieliński (semifinals)
15. (United Kingdom) Lloyd Glasspool / (Croatia) Nikola Mektić (second round)
16. (Belgium) Sander Gillé / (Belgium) Joran Vliegen (first round)

== Draw ==
Key

- Q = Qualifier
- WC = Wild card
- LL = Lucky loser
- Alt = Alternate
- ITF = ITF entry
- PR = Protected ranking
- SR = Special ranking
- SE = Special exempt
- JE = Junior exempt
- JR = Junior Accelerator Programme entrant
- CO = College Accelerator Programme entrant
- NG = Next Gen Accelerator Program entrant
- w/o = Walkover
- r = Retired
- d = Defaulted

=== Finals ===
Semifinals
1 | (Spain) Marcel Granollers (Argentina) Horacio Zeballos | 6 | 2 | [10]
4 | (El Salvador) Marcelo Arévalo (Croatia) Mate Pavić | 2 | 6 | [1]
3 | (United States) Rajeev Ram (United Kingdom) Joe Salisbury | 6 | 4 | [11]
14 | (Monaco) Hugo Nys (Poland) Jan Zieliński | 2 | 6 | [9]

Final
1 | (Spain) Marcel Granollers (Argentina) Horacio Zeballos | 6 | 7^{7}
3 | (United States) Rajeev Ram (United Kingdom) Joe Salisbury | 2 | 6^{4}

=== Top half ===
First round
(Argentina) TM Etcheverry (Chile) A Tabilo | 1 | 6 | [10]
13 | (United States) N Lammons (United States) J Withrow | 6 | 4 | [4]
12 | (Australia) M Purcell (Australia) J Thompson | 6 | 6
WC | (Canada) F Auger-Aliassime (Canada) A Galarneau | 0 | 1
WC | (Canada) V Pospisil (Canada) D Shapovalov | 4 | 3
5 | (Italy) S Bolelli (Italy) A Vavassori | 6 | 6
(Bulgaria) G Dimitrov (United Kingdom) J Murray | 5 | 5
9 | (United Kingdom) N Skupski (New Zealand) M Venus | 7 | 7
10 | (Germany) K Krawietz (Germany) T Pütz | 6 | 6
WC | (Canada) L Draxl (Canada) B Sigouin | 4 | 3
(Serbia) M Kecmanović (Norway) C Ruud | 7^{7} | 6
7 | (Argentina) M González (Argentina) A Molteni | 6^{4} | 3

Second round
1 | (Spain) M Granollers (Argentina) H Zeballos | 6 | 6
(Argentina) TM Etcheverry (Chile) A Tabilo | 4 | 2
12 | (Australia) M Purcell (Australia) J Thompson | 3 | 6^{4}
5 | (Italy) S Bolelli (Italy) A Vavassori | 6 | 7^{7}
4 | (El Salvador) M Arévalo (Croatia) M Pavić | 7^{7} | 6
9 | (United Kingdom) N Skupski (New Zealand) M Venus | 6^{4} | 3
10 | (Germany) K Krawietz (Germany) T Pütz | 7^{7} | 3
(Serbia) M Kecmanović (Norway) C Ruud | 6^{2} | 2^{r}

Quarterfinals
1 | (Spain) M Granollers (Argentina) H Zeballos | 6 | 6
5 | (Italy) S Bolelli (Italy) A Vavassori | 3 | 4
4 | (El Salvador) M Arévalo (Croatia) M Pavić | 3 | 6 | [10]
10 | (Germany) K Krawietz (Germany) T Pütz | 6 | 2 | [5]

Semifinals
1 | (Spain) M Granollers (Argentina) H Zeballos | 6 | 2 | [10]
4 | (El Salvador) M Arévalo (Croatia) M Pavić | 2 | 6 | [1]

=== Bottom half ===
First round
6 | (Mexico) S González (France) É Roger-Vasselin | 6 | 6
(Netherlands) T Griekspoor (United States) S Korda | 2 | 2
D Medvedev; R Safiullin | 6 | 6
11 | (Croatia) I Dodig (Netherlands) J-J Rojer | 4 | 3
15 | (United Kingdom) L Glasspool (Croatia) N Mektić | 6 | 6
K Khachanov; A Rublev | 3 | 4
8 | (Finland) H Heliövaara (United Kingdom) H Patten | 6^{6} | 1^{r}
(Kazakhstan) A Bublik (United States) B Shelton | 7^{8} | 2
(United Kingdom) J Draper (Italy) J Sinner | 6 | 6^{3} | [10]
16 | (Belgium) S Gillé (Belgium) J Vliegen | 0 | 7^{7} | [8]
14 | (Monaco) H Nys (Poland) J Zieliński | 4 | 6 | [10]
(France) A Fils (Chile) N Jarry | 6 | 3 | [5]

Second round
6 | (Mexico) S González (France) É Roger-Vasselin | 6 | 1 | [7]
D Medvedev; R Safiullin | 3 | 6 | [10]
15 | (United Kingdom) L Glasspool (Croatia) N Mektić | 3 | 6^{4}
3 | (United States) R Ram (United Kingdom) J Salisbury | 6 | 7^{7}
(Kazakhstan) A Bublik (United States) B Shelton | 6^{2} | 1
(United Kingdom) J Draper (Italy) J Sinner | 7^{7} | 6
14 | (Monaco) H Nys (Poland) J Zieliński | 4 | 6 | [10]
2 | (India) R Bopanna (Australia) M Ebden | 6 | 3 | [7]

Quarterfinals
D Medvedev; R Safiullin | 4 | 4
3 | (United States) R Ram (United Kingdom) J Salisbury | 6 | 6
(United Kingdom) J Draper (Italy) J Sinner
14 | (Monaco) H Nys (Poland) J Zieliński | w/o

Semifinals
3 | (United States) R Ram (United Kingdom) J Salisbury | 6 | 4 | [11]
14 | (Monaco) H Nys (Poland) J Zieliński | 2 | 6 | [9]

== Seeded teams ==
The following are the seeded teams. Seedings are based on ATP rankings as of 29 July 2024.

| Country | Player | Country | Player | Rank | Seed |
|---|---|---|---|---|---|
| ESP | Marcel Granollers | ARG | Horacio Zeballos | 2 | 1 |
| IND | Rohan Bopanna | AUS | Matthew Ebden | 7 | 2 |
| USA | Rajeev Ram | GBR | Joe Salisbury | 11 | 3 |
| ESA | Marcelo Arévalo | CRO | Mate Pavić | 15 | 4 |
| ITA | Simone Bolelli | ITA | Andrea Vavassori | 19 | 5 |
| MEX | Santiago González | FRA | Édouard Roger-Vasselin | 26 | 6 |
| ARG | Máximo González | ARG | Andrés Molteni | 28 | 7 |
| FIN | Harri Heliövaara | GBR | Henry Patten | 30 | 8 |
| GBR | Neal Skupski | NZL | Michael Venus | 39 | 9 |
| GER | Kevin Krawietz | GER | Tim Pütz | 42 | 10 |
| CRO | Ivan Dodig | NED | Jean-Julien Rojer | 46 | 11 |
| AUS | Max Purcell | AUS | Jordan Thompson | 47 | 12 |
| USA | Nathaniel Lammons | USA | Jackson Withrow | 56 | 13 |
| MON | Hugo Nys | POL | Jan Zieliński | 61 | 14 |
| GBR | Lloyd Glasspool | CRO | Nikola Mektić | 67 | 15 |
| BEL | Sander Gillé | BEL | Joran Vliegen | 70 | 16 |

== Other entry information ==
=== Wild cards ===
- (Canada) Félix Auger-Aliassime / (Canada) Alexis Galarneau
- (Canada) Liam Draxl / (Canada) Benjamin Sigouin
- (Canada) Vasek Pospisil / (Canada) Denis Shapovalov

=== Withdrawals ===
- (France) Sadio Doumbia / (France) Fabien Reboul → replaced by (United States) Nathaniel Lammons / (United States) Jackson Withrow
- (Netherlands) Wesley Koolhof / (Croatia) Nikola Mektić → replaced by (United Kingdom) Lloyd Glasspool / (Croatia) Nikola Mektić
