= 2024 National Bank Open =

Canadian tennis tournament

- Date: 6–12 August 2024
- Edition: 134th (men) / 122nd (women)
- Category: ATP Tour Masters 1000 (men); WTA 1000 (women)
- Draw: 56S / 28D
- Prize money: $6,795,555 (men) $3,211,715 (women)
- Surface: Hard / outdoor
- Location: Montreal, Quebec, Canada (men); Toronto, Ontario, Canada (women)

Champions

Men's singles
- (Australia) Alexei Popyrin

Women's singles
- (United States) Jessica Pegula

Men's doubles
- (Spain) Marcel Granollers / (Argentina) Horacio Zeballos

Women's doubles
- (United States) Caroline Dolehide / (United States) Desirae Krawczyk
- Canadian Open (tennis)

The 2024 Canadian Open championships (branded as the National Bank Open presented by Rogers for sponsorship reasons) is a pair of outdoor hardcourt tennis tournaments that took place from 6–12 August 2024. The men's tournament took place at the IGA Stadium in Montreal and the women's event took place at the Sobeys Stadium in Toronto. It was the 134th edition of the men's tournament—a mandatory Masters 1000 event on the 2024 ATP Tour, and the 122nd edition of the women's tournament—a mandatory WTA 1000 event on the 2024 WTA Tour.

== Points distribution ==
Event	W	F	SF	QF	Round of 16	Round of 32	Round of 64	Q	Q2	Q1
Men's Singles	1,000	650	400	200	100	50	10	30	16	0
Men's Doubles	1,000	600	360	180	90	0	—N/a	—N/a	—N/a	—N/a
Women's singles	1,000	650	390	215	120	65	10	30	20	2
Women's doubles	1,000	650	390	215	120	10	—N/a	—N/a	—N/a	—N/a

== Champions ==
=== Men's singles ===
- (Australia) Alexei Popyrin def. Andrey Rublev, 6–2, 6–4

=== Women's singles ===
- (United States) Jessica Pegula def. (United States) Amanda Anisimova, 6–3, 2–6, 6–1

=== Men's doubles ===
- (Spain) Marcel Granollers / (Argentina) Horacio Zeballos def. (United States) Rajeev Ram / (United Kingdom) Joe Salisbury, 6–2, 7–6^{(7–4)}

=== Women's doubles ===
- (United States) Caroline Dolehide / (United States) Desirae Krawczyk def. (Canada) Gabriela Dabrowski / (New Zealand) Erin Routliffe 7–6^{(7–2)}, 3–6, [10–7]
