= 2024 Monte-Carlo Masters =

- Date: 7–14 April
- Edition: 117th
- Category: Masters 1000
- Draw: 56S / 28D
- Prize money: €5,950,575
- Surface: Clay
- Location: Roquebrune-Cap-Martin, France (billed as Monte Carlo, Monaco)
- Venue: Monte Carlo Country Club

Champions

Singles
- (Greece) Stefanos Tsitsipas

Doubles
- (Belgium) Sander Gillé / (Belgium) Joran Vliegen
- Monte-Carlo Masters

The 2024 Monte-Carlo Masters (also known as the Rolex Monte-Carlo Masters for sponsorship reasons) was a tennis tournament for male professionals played on outdoor clay courts. It was the 117th edition of the annual Monte Carlo Masters tournament, sponsored by Rolex for the 15th time. It was held at the Monte Carlo Country Club in Roquebrune-Cap-Martin, France (though billed as Monte Carlo, Monaco). The event was an ATP Masters 1000 tournament on the 2024 ATP Tour.

== Champions ==
=== Singles ===
- (Greece) Stefanos Tsitsipas def. (Norway) Casper Ruud 6–1, 6–4

=== Doubles ===
- (Belgium) Sander Gillé / (Belgium) Joran Vliegen def. (Brazil) Marcelo Melo / (Germany) Alexander Zverev, 5–7, 6–3, [10–5].

== Points ==
Because the Monte Carlo Masters is a non-mandatory Masters 1000 event, special rules regarding points distribution are in place. The Monte Carlo Masters counts as one of a player's 500 level tournaments, while distributing Masters 1000 points.

Event	W	F	SF	QF	Round of 16	Round of 32	Round of 64	Q	Q2	Q1
Men's Singles	1,000	650	400	200	100	50	10	30	16	0
Men's Doubles	1,000	600	360	180	90	0	—N/a	—N/a	—N/a	—N/a

=== Prize money ===
Event	W	F	SF	QF	Round of 16	Round of 32	Round of 64	Q2	Q1
Singles	€919,075	€501,880	€274,425	€149,685	€80,065	€42,935	€23,785	€12,185	€6,380
Doubles*	€281,960	€153,170	€84,140	€46,420	€25,510	€13,930	—N/a	—N/a	—N/a

_{*per team}

== Singles main draw entrants ==
=== Seeds ===
Country	Player	Rank^{1}	Seed
SRB	Novak Djokovic	1	1
ITA	Jannik Sinner	2	2
~~ESP~~	~~Carlos Alcaraz~~	~~3~~	~~3~~
	Daniil Medvedev	4	4
GER	Alexander Zverev	5	5
	Andrey Rublev	6	6
DEN	Holger Rune	7	7
NOR	Casper Ruud	8	8
BUL	Grigor Dimitrov	9	9
POL	Hubert Hurkacz	10	10
AUS	Alex de Minaur	11	11
GRE	Stefanos Tsitsipas	12	12
USA	Taylor Fritz	13	13
FRA	Ugo Humbert	14	14
	Karen Khachanov	17	15
KAZ	Alexander Bublik	18	16

^{1} Rankings are as of 1 April 2024

=== Other entrants ===
The following players received wildcards into the main draw:

- (Italy) Matteo Berrettini
- (France) Gaël Monfils
- (Monaco) Valentin Vacherot
- (Switzerland) Stan Wawrinka

The following players received entry via the qualifying draw:

- (Spain) Roberto Bautista Agut
- (Argentina) Federico Coria
- (France) Corentin Moutet
- (Spain) Jaume Munar
- (India) Sumit Nagal
- (Italy) Luca Nardi
- (Australia) Christopher O'Connell

The following players received entry as lucky losers:

- (Germany) Daniel Altmaier
- (Argentina) Facundo Díaz Acosta
- (Germany) Yannick Hanfmann
- (Italy) Lorenzo Sonego
- (Australia) Aleksandar Vukic

=== Withdrawals ===
- (Spain) Carlos Alcaraz → replaced by (Italy) Lorenzo Sonego
- (Croatia) Marin Čilić → replaced by (Germany) Dominik Koepfer
- (Czech Republic) Jiří Lehečka → replaced by (Germany) Daniel Altmaier
- (France) Adrian Mannarino → replaced by (Germany) Yannick Hanfmann
- (Spain) Rafael Nadal → replaced by (China) Zhang Zhizhen
- (United States) Tommy Paul → replaced by (United States) Marcos Giron
- (Finland) Emil Ruusuvuori → replaced by (Argentina) Facundo Díaz Acosta
- (Australia) Jordan Thompson → replaced by (Australia) Aleksandar Vukic

== Doubles main draw entrants ==
=== Seeds ===
Country	Player	Country	Player	Rank^{1}	Seed
IND	Rohan Bopanna	AUS	Matthew Ebden	3	1
CRO	Ivan Dodig	USA	Austin Krajicek	7	2
ESP	Marcel Granollers	ARG	Horacio Zeballos	11	3
USA	Rajeev Ram	GBR	Joe Salisbury	17	4
MEX	Santiago González	GBR	Neal Skupski	22	5
GER	Kevin Krawietz	GER	Tim Pütz	26	6
NED	Wesley Koolhof	CRO	Nikola Mektić	30	7
ARG	Máximo González	ARG	Andrés Molteni	30	8

^{1} Rankings are as of 1 April 2024.

=== Other entrants ===
The following pairs received wildcards into the doubles main draw:

- (Monaco) Romain Arneodo / (Austria) Sam Weissborn
- (France) Arthur Rinderknech / (Monaco) Valentin Vacherot
- (Italy) Jannik Sinner / (Italy) Lorenzo Sonego

The following pair received entry into the doubles main draw as alternates:

- (Brazil) Marcelo Melo / (Germany) Alexander Zverev

=== Withdrawals ===
- (Netherlands) Tallon Griekspoor / (Poland) Hubert Hurkacz → replaced by (Brazil) Marcelo Melo / (Germany) Alexander Zverev
