= 2024 ATP Finals – Singles =

Singles
- 2024 ATP Finals

Final
- Champion: (Italy) Jannik Sinner
- Runner-up: (United States) Taylor Fritz
- Score: 6–4, 6–4

Details
- Draw: 8 (round robin + elimination)
- Seeds: 8

Events
Singles	Doubles
- ATP Finals

Jannik Sinner defeated Taylor Fritz in the final, 6–4, 6–4 to win the singles tennis title at the 2024 ATP Finals. Sinner became the first Italian to win the title, and did not drop a set en route, the first player to do so since Ivan Lendl in 1986. He dropped just 33 games to win the title, the fewest in the tournament's history. Fritz was the first American to reach the championship match since James Blake in 2006.

Novak Djokovic was the two-time reigning champion and qualified this year, but withdrew from the tournament due to injury. This marked the first edition of the tournament with none of the Big Three since 2001.

Alex de Minaur made his debut at the event.

== Seeds ==
1. (Italy) Jannik Sinner (champion)
2. (Germany) Alexander Zverev (semifinals)
3. (Spain) Carlos Alcaraz (round robin)
4. Daniil Medvedev (round robin)
5. (United States) Taylor Fritz (final)
6. (Norway) Casper Ruud (semifinals)
7. (Australia) Alex de Minaur (round robin)
8. Andrey Rublev (round robin)

== Alternates ==
1. (Bulgaria) Grigor Dimitrov (did not play)
2. (Greece) Stefanos Tsitsipas (did not play)

== Draw ==
=== Finals ===
Semifinals
1	(Italy) Jannik Sinner	6	6
6	(Norway) Casper Ruud	1	2
2	(Germany) Alexander Zverev	3	6	6^{3}
5	(United States) Taylor Fritz	6	3	7^{7}

Final
1	(Italy) Jannik Sinner	6	6
5	(United States) Taylor Fritz	4	4

=== Ilie Năstase Group ===
		(Italy) Sinner	Medvedev	(United States) Fritz	(Australia) de Minaur	RR; W–L	Set; W–L	Game; W–L	Standings
1	(Italy) Jannik Sinner		6–3, 6–4	6–4, 6–4	6–3, 6–4	3–0	6–0 (100%)	36–22 (62%)	1
4	Daniil Medvedev	3–6, 4–6		4–6, 3–6	6–2, 6–4	1–2	2–4 (33%)	26–30 (46%)	3
5	(United States) Taylor Fritz	4–6, 4–6	6–4, 6–3		5–7, 6–4, 6–3	2–1	4–3 (57%)	37–33 (53%)	2
7	(Australia) Alex de Minaur	3–6, 4–6	2–6, 4–6	7–5, 4–6, 3–6		0–3	1–6 (14%)	27–41 (40%)	4

=== John Newcombe Group ===
		(Germany) Zverev	(Spain) Alcaraz	(Norway) Ruud	Rublev	RR; W–L	Set; W–L	Game; W–L	Standings
2	(Germany) Alexander Zverev		7–6^{(7–5)}, 6–4	7–6^{(7–3)}, 6–3	6–4, 6–4	3–0	6–0 (100%)	38–27 (58%)	1
3	(Spain) Carlos Alcaraz	6–7^{(5–7)}, 4–6		1–6, 5–7	6–3, 7–6^{(10–8)}	1–2	2–4 (33%)	29–35 (45%)	3
6	(Norway) Casper Ruud	6–7^{(3–7)}, 3–6	6–1, 7–5		6–4, 5–7, 6–2	2–1	4–3 (57%)	39–32 (55%)	2
8	Andrey Rublev	4–6, 4–6	3–6, 6–7^{(8–10)}	4–6, 7–5, 2–6		0–3	1–6 (14%)	30–42 (42%)	4

Standings are determined by: 1. number of wins; 2. number of matches; 3. in two-player ties, head-to-head records; 4. in three-player ties, (a) percentage of sets won (head-to-head records if two players remain tied), then (b) percentage of games won (head-to-head records if two players remain tied), then (c) ATP rankings.
