= 2024 Halle Open =

- Date: 17–23 June
- Edition: 31st
- Category: ATP Tour 500
- Draw: 32S / 16D
- Prize money: €2,255,655
- Surface: Grass
- Location: Halle, Germany
- Venue: OWL Arena

Champions

Singles
- (Italy) Jannik Sinner

Doubles
- (Italy) Simone Bolelli / (Italy) Andrea Vavassori
← 2023 ·	Halle Open	· 2025 →

The 2024 Halle Open (known for sponsorship reasons as the Terra Wortmann Open) was a men's tennis tournament played on outdoor grass courts. It was the 31st edition of the Halle Open and part of the ATP Tour 500 series of the 2024 ATP Tour. It took place at the OWL Arena in Halle, North Rhine-Westphalia, Germany, between 17 June and 23 June 2024.

== Finals ==
=== Singles ===
- (Italy) Jannik Sinner def. (Poland) Hubert Hurkacz, 7–6^{(10–8)}, 7–6^{(7–2)}

=== Doubles ===
- (Italy) Simone Bolelli / (Italy) Andrea Vavassori def. (Germany) Kevin Krawietz / (Germany) Tim Pütz, 7–6^{(7–3)}, 7–6^{(7–5)}

== Points and prize money ==
=== Points distribution ===
Event	W	F	SF	QF	Round of 16	Round of 32	Q	Q2	Q1
Singles	500	330	200	100	50	0	25	13	0
Doubles	500	300	180	90	0	—	45	25	0

=== Prize money ===
Event	W	F	SF	QF	Round of 16	Round of 32	Q2	Q1
Singles	€421,790	€226,945	€120,960	€61,800	€32,990	€17,595	€9,015	€5,060
Doubles*	€138,550	€73,900	€37,390	€18,690	€9,680	—	—	—

_{*per team}

== Singles main draw entrants ==
=== Seeds ===
Country	Player	Rank^{1}	Seed
ITA	Jannik Sinner	1	1
GER	Alexander Zverev	4	2
	Daniil Medvedev	5	3
	Andrey Rublev	6	4
POL	Hubert Hurkacz	8	5
GRE	Stefanos Tsitsipas	11	6
KAZ	Alexander Bublik	17	7
CAN	Félix Auger-Aliassime	18	8

- ^{1} Rankings are as of 10 June 2024.

=== Other entrants ===
The following players received wildcards into the main draw:

- (Germany) Dominik Koepfer
- (Germany) Henri Squire
- (Brazil) João Fonseca

The following player received entry as a special exempt:

- (Italy) Matteo Berrettini

The following players received entry from the qualifying draw:

- (Australia) James Duckworth
- (United States) Alex Michelsen
- (Germany) Oscar Otte
- (Australia) Max Purcell

=== Withdrawals ===
- (Japan) Kei Nishikori → replaced by (Serbia) Miomir Kecmanović

== Doubles main draw entrants ==
=== Seeds ===
Country	Player	Country	Player	Rank^{1}	Seed
ITA	Simone Bolelli	ITA	Andrea Vavassori	21	1
GER	Kevin Krawietz	GER	Tim Pütz	34	2
USA	Nathaniel Lammons	USA	Jackson Withrow	44	3
MON	Hugo Nys	POL	Jan Zieliński	55	4

- ^{1} Rankings are as of 10 June 2024.

=== Other entrants ===
The following pairs received wildcards into the doubles main draw:

- (Germany) Constantin Frantzen / (Germany) Hendrik Jebens
- (Germany) Yannick Hanfmann / (Germany) Dominik Koepfer

The following pair received entry from the qualifying draw:

- (India) Yuki Bhambri / (France) Albano Olivetti

The following pair received entry as lucky losers:

- (Spain) Pedro Martínez / (Kazakhstan) Aleksandr Nedovyesov

=== Withdrawals ===
- (Netherlands) Tallon Griekspoor / (Germany) Jan-Lennard Struff → replaced by (Spain) Pedro Martínez / (Kazakhstan) Aleksandr Nedovyesov
