= 2024 Halle Open – Doubles =

Doubles
- 2024 Halle Open

Final
- Champions: (Italy) Simone Bolelli (Italy) Andrea Vavassori
- Runners-up: (Germany) Kevin Krawietz (Germany) Tim Pütz
- Score: 7–6^{(7–3)}, 7–6^{(7–5)}

Details
- Draw: 16
- Seeds: 4

Events
Singles	Doubles
- Halle Open

Simone Bolelli and Andrea Vavassori defeated Kevin Krawietz and Tim Pütz in the final, 7–6^{(7–3)}, 7–6^{(7–5)} to win the doubles tennis title at the 2024 Halle Open.

Marcelo Melo and John Peers were the reigning champions, but Melo did not participate and Peers chose to compete in Queen's Club instead.

== Seeds ==
1. (Italy) Simone Bolelli / (Italy) Andrea Vavassori (champions)
2. (Germany) Kevin Krawietz / (Germany) Tim Pütz (final)
3. (United States) Nathaniel Lammons / (United States) Jackson Withrow (first round)
4. (Monaco) Hugo Nys / (Poland) Jan Zieliński (quarterfinals)

== Draw ==
Key

- Q = Qualifier
- WC = Wild card
- LL = Lucky loser
- Alt = Alternate
- ITF = ITF entry
- PR = Protected ranking
- SR = Special ranking
- SE = Special exempt
- JE = Junior exempt
- JR = Junior Accelerator Programme entrant
- CO = College Accelerator Programme entrant
- NG = Next Gen Accelerator Program entrant
- w/o = Walkover
- r = Retired
- d = Defaulted

=== Draw ===
First round
1	(Italy) S Bolelli (Italy) A Vavassori	6	6
LL	(Spain) P Martínez (Kazakhstan) A Nedovyesov	3	3
(Kazakhstan) A Bublik (France) A Fils	6	7
(Uruguay) A Behar (Czech Republic) A Pavlásek	4	5
4	(Monaco) H Nys (Poland) J Zieliński	6	6
(Czech Republic) T Macháč (China) Z Zhang	1	3
A Rublev (Germany) A Zverev	4	6	[3]
WC	(Germany) Y Hanfmann (Germany) D Koepfer	6	2	[10]
(Belgium) S Gillé (Belgium) J Vliegen	6^{6}	4
(France) S Doumbia (France) F Reboul	7^{8}	6
(Poland) H Hurkacz (Italy) J Sinner	6	5	[11]
3	(United States) N Lammons (United States) J Withrow	4	7	[9]
WC	(Germany) C Frantzen (Germany) H Jebens	5	7^{14}	[10]
Q	(India) Y Bhambri (France) A Olivetti	7	6^{12}	[7]
(United Kingdom) L Glasspool (Netherlands) J-J Rojer	6^{6}	3
2	(Germany) K Krawietz (Germany) T Pütz	7^{8}	6

Quarterfinals
1	(Italy) S Bolelli (Italy) A Vavassori	6	6
(Kazakhstan) A Bublik (France) A Fils	4	3
4	(Monaco) H Nys (Poland) J Zieliński	6^{4}	6	[8]
WC	(Germany) Y Hanfmann (Germany) D Koepfer	7^{7}	3	[10]
(France) S Doumbia (France) F Reboul	7^{7}	4	[10]
(Poland) H Hurkacz (Italy) J Sinner	6^{3}	6	[8]
WC	(Germany) C Frantzen (Germany) H Jebens	6^{3}	4
2	(Germany) K Krawietz (Germany) T Pütz	7^{7}	6

Semifinals
1	(Italy) S Bolelli (Italy) A Vavassori	6	7^{8}
WC	(Germany) Y Hanfmann (Germany) D Koepfer	3	6^{6}
(France) S Doumbia (France) F Reboul	1	6	[5]
2	(Germany) K Krawietz (Germany) T Pütz	6	4	[10]

Final
1	(Italy) S Bolelli (Italy) A Vavassori	7^{7}	7^{7}
2	(Germany) K Krawietz (Germany) T Pütz	6^{3}	6^{5}

== Qualifying ==
=== Seeds ===
1. (India) Yuki Bhambri / (France) Albano Olivetti
2. (Spain) Pedro Martínez / (Kazakhstan) Aleksandr Nedovyesov (qualifying competition, lucky losers)

=== Qualifiers ===
1. (India) Yuki Bhambri / (France) Albano Olivetti

=== Lucky losers ===
1. (Spain) Pedro Martínez / (Kazakhstan) Aleksandr Nedovyesov

=== Qualifying draw ===
First round
1/Alt	(India) Yuki Bhambri (France) Albano Olivetti	7^{7}	6
Daniil Medvedev; Roman Safiullin	6^{4}	4
WC	(Germany) Andreas Mies (Germany) Oscar Otte	6	6^{5}	[8]
2	(Spain) Pedro Martínez (Kazakhstan) Aleksandr Nedovyesov	3	7^{7}	[10]

Qualifying competition
1/Alt	(India) Yuki Bhambri (France) Albano Olivetti	7	6
2	(Spain) Pedro Martínez (Kazakhstan) Aleksandr Nedovyesov	5	3
