= 2024 ABN AMRO Open – Singles =

Singles
- 2024 ABN AMRO Open

Final
- Champion: (Italy) Jannik Sinner
- Runner-up: (Australia) Alex de Minaur
- Score: 7–5, 6–4

Details
- Draw: 32 (4 Q / 3 WC )
- Seeds: 8

Events
Singles	Doubles
- Rotterdam Open

Jannik Sinner defeated Alex de Minaur in the final, 7–5, 6–4 to win the singles tennis title at the 2024 Rotterdam Open. Sinner became the first male player since Lleyton Hewitt, in 2001, to win his debut event as Grand Slam champion, after his Australian Open victory the previous month.

Daniil Medvedev was the reigning champion, but withdrew before the tournament began.

== Seeds ==
1. (Italy) Jannik Sinner (champion)
2. Andrey Rublev (quarterfinals)
3. (Denmark) Holger Rune (second round)
4. (Poland) Hubert Hurkacz (second round)
5. (Australia) Alex de Minaur (final)
6. (Bulgaria) Grigor Dimitrov (semifinals)
7. (France) Ugo Humbert (first round)
8. (Kazakhstan) Alexander Bublik (second round)

== Draw ==
Key

- Q = Qualifier
- WC = Wild card
- LL = Lucky loser
- Alt = Alternate
- ITF = ITF entry
- PR = Protected ranking
- SR = Special ranking
- SE = Special exempt
- JE = Junior exempt
- JR = Junior Accelerator Programme entrant
- CO = College Accelerator Programme entrant
- NG = Next Gen Accelerator Program entrant
- w/o = Walkover
- r = Retired
- d = Defaulted

=== Finals ===
Semifinals
1	(Italy) Jannik Sinner	6	6
(Netherlands) Tallon Griekspoor	2	4
6	(Bulgaria) Grigor Dimitrov	4	3
5	(Australia) Alex de Minaur	6	6

Final
1	(Italy) Jannik Sinner	7	6
5	(Australia) Alex de Minaur	5	4

=== Top half ===
First round
1	(Italy) J Sinner	6	6
(Netherlands) B van de Zandschulp	3	3
Q	(Canada) D Shapovalov	6^{4}	6^{5}
WC	(France) G Monfils	7^{7}	7^{7}
PR	(Canada) M Raonic	7^{7}	6
WC	(Netherlands) J de Jong	6^{5}	4
(Croatia) B Ćorić	3	4
8	(Kazakhstan) A Bublik	6	6
4	(Poland) H Hurkacz	6	6^{9}	7^{11}
(Czech Republic) J Lehečka	3	7^{11}	6^{9}
(Netherlands) T Griekspoor	3	7^{9}	7^{7}
(Italy) L Musetti	6	6^{7}	6^{3}
(Spain) A Davidovich Fokina	6	6^{5}	6^{4}
(Germany) J-L Struff	4	7^{7}	7^{7}
(Finland) E Ruusuvuori	7^{7}	4	6
7	(France) U Humbert	6^{5}	6	3

Second round
1	(Italy) J Sinner	6	3	6
WC	(France) G Monfils	3	6	3
PR	(Canada) M Raonic	6	6
8	(Kazakhstan) A Bublik	4	4
4	(Poland) H Hurkacz	7^{7}	6^{5}	6^{4}
(Netherlands) T Griekspoor	6^{5}	7^{7}	7^{7}
(Germany) J-L Struff	3	3
(Finland) E Ruusuvuori	6	6

Quarterfinals
1	(Italy) J Sinner	7^{7}	1
PR	(Canada) M Raonic	6^{4}	1^{r}
(Netherlands) T Griekspoor	7	7^{7}
(Finland) E Ruusuvuori	5	6^{4}

Semifinals
1	(Italy) J Sinner	6	6
(Netherlands) T Griekspoor	2	4

=== Bottom half ===
First round
6	(Bulgaria) G Dimitrov	7^{7}	6
(Italy) L Sonego	6^{4}	3
(Hungary) F Marozsán	6^{5}	1
(Hungary) M Fucsovics	7^{7}	6
(China) Z Zhang	6	4	3
(Kazakhstan) A Shevchenko	4	6	6
R Safiullin	4	6	1
3	(Denmark) H Rune	6	2	6
5	(Australia) A de Minaur	6	6
(United States) S Korda	4	3
WC	(Croatia) D Prižmić	4	7^{14}	1
Q	(Belgium) D Goffin	6	6^{12}	6
Q	(United States) M Cressy	6^{3}	6^{8}
(Canada) F Auger-Aliassime	7^{7}	7^{10}
Q	(Belgium) Z Bergs	5	3
2	A Rublev	7	6

Second round
6	(Bulgaria) G Dimitrov	6	7
(Hungary) M Fucsovics	3	5
(Kazakhstan) A Shevchenko	6	1	6
3	(Denmark) H Rune	4	6	3
5	(Australia) A de Minaur	6	6
Q	(Belgium) D Goffin	3	1
(Canada) F Auger-Aliassime	6	6^{6}	5
2	A Rublev	3	7^{8}	7

Quarterfinals
6	(Bulgaria) G Dimitrov	7^{7}	3	6
(Kazakhstan) A Shevchenko	6^{2}	6	4
5	(Australia) A de Minaur	7^{7}	4	6
2	A Rublev	6^{5}	6	3

Semifinals
6	(Bulgaria) G Dimitrov	4	3
5	(Australia) A de Minaur	6	6

== Qualifying ==
=== Seeds ===
1. (France) Luca Van Assche (first round)
2. (Hungary) Márton Fucsovics (moved to main draw)
3. (France) Hugo Gaston (qualifying competition)
4. (Austria) Jurij Rodionov (first round)
5. (France) Arthur Rinderknech (first round)
6. (Germany) Maximilian Marterer (first round)
7. (Spain) Roberto Bautista Agut (first round)
8. (France) Grégoire Barrère (first round)

=== Qualifiers ===
1. (Belgium) David Goffin
2. (United States) Maxime Cressy
3. (Canada) Denis Shapovalov
4. (Belgium) Zizou Bergs

=== Qualifying draw ===
==== First qualifier ====
First round
1	(France) Luca Van Assche	3	3
WC	(Netherlands) Gijs Brouwer	6	6
(Belgium) David Goffin	6	6
8	(France) Grégoire Barrère	4	2

Qualifying competition
WC	(Netherlands) Gijs Brouwer	6^{8}	2
(Belgium) David Goffin	7^{10}	6

==== Second qualifier ====
First round
Alt	(Spain) Pablo Llamas Ruiz	6	7
WC	(Netherlands) Guy den Ouden	4	5
(United States) Maxime Cressy	6	3	6
5	(France) Arthur Rinderknech	3	6	3

Qualifying competition
Alt	(Spain) Pablo Llamas Ruiz	7^{8}	4	4
(United States) Maxime Cressy	6^{6}	6	6

==== Third qualifier ====
First round
3	(France) Hugo Gaston	6	6
WC	(Netherlands) Thijs Boogaard	3	3
(Canada) Denis Shapovalov	7	6
6	(Germany) Maximilian Marterer	5	4

Qualifying competition
3	(France) Hugo Gaston	4	0
(Canada) Denis Shapovalov	6	6

==== Fourth qualifier ====
First round
4	(Austria) Jurij Rodionov	4	6^{5}
(Belgium) Zizou Bergs	6	7^{7}
(Italy) Giulio Zeppieri	6	6
7	(Spain) Roberto Bautista Agut	3	4

Qualifying competition
(Belgium) Zizou Bergs	6	7
(Italy) Giulio Zeppieri	3	5
