= 2024 Halle Open – Singles =

Singles
- 2024 Halle Open

Final
- Champion: (Italy) Jannik Sinner
- Runner-up: (Poland) Hubert Hurkacz
- Score: 7–6^{(10–8)}, 7–6^{(7–2)}

Details
- Draw: 32 (4Q / 3WC)
- Seeds: 8

Events
Singles	Doubles
← 2023 ·	Halle Open	· 2025 →

Jannik Sinner defeated Hubert Hurkacz in the final with a score of 7–6^{(10–8)}, 7–6^{(7–2)} to win the singles tennis title at the 2024 Halle Open. This victory marked Sinner's 14th career ATP Tour title, his fourth title in 2024, and his first championship on grass.

Alexander Bublik was the defending champion but lost in the second round to Christopher Eubanks.

== Seeds ==
1. (Italy) Jannik Sinner (champion)
2. (Germany) Alexander Zverev (semifinals)
3. Daniil Medvedev (second round)
4. Andrey Rublev (first round)
5. (Poland) Hubert Hurkacz (final)
6. (Greece) Stefanos Tsitsipas (second round)
7. (Kazakhstan) Alexander Bublik (second round)
8. (Canada) Félix Auger-Aliassime (first round, retired)

== Draw ==
Key

- Q = Qualifier
- WC = Wild card
- LL = Lucky loser
- Alt = Alternate
- ITF = ITF entry
- PR = Protected ranking
- SR = Special ranking
- SE = Special exempt
- JE = Junior exempt
- JR = Junior Accelerator Programme entrant
- CO = College Accelerator Programme entrant
- NG = Next Gen Accelerator Program entrant
- w/o = Walkover
- r = Retired
- d = Defaulted

=== Finals ===
Semifinals
1	(Italy) Jannik Sinner	6	7^{7}
(China) Zhang Zhizhen	4	6^{3}
5	(Poland) Hubert Hurkacz	7^{7}	6
2	(Germany) Alexander Zverev	6^{2}	4

Final
1	(Italy) Jannik Sinner	7^{10}	7^{7}
5	(Poland) Hubert Hurkacz	6^{8}	6^{2}

=== Top half ===
First round
1	(Italy) J Sinner	6^{8}	6	6
(Netherlands) T Griekspoor	7^{10}	3	2
(Hungary) F Marozsán	7	4	6
R Safiullin	5	6	1
(Italy) L Darderi	7^{7}	5	6^{10}
(Germany) J-L Struff	6^{2}	7	7^{12}
WC	(Germany) H Squire	6^{7}	6^{2}
6	(Greece) S Tsitsipas	7^{9}	7^{7}
3	D Medvedev	7^{7}	6
(Portugal) N Borges	6^{4}	4
(Austria) S Ofner	6^{8}	7^{7}	4
(China) Z Zhang	7^{10}	6^{3}	6
(United States) C Eubanks	6	6
(Spain) P Martínez	3	4
Q	(Australia) M Purcell	6^{1}	4
7	(Kazakhstan) A Bublik	7^{7}	6

Second round
1	(Italy) J Sinner	6	6^{4}	6
(Hungary) F Marozsán	4	7^{7}	3
(Germany) J-L Struff	6	6
6	(Greece) S Tsitsipas	4	4
3	D Medvedev	3	6	6^{5}
(China) Z Zhang	6	2	7^{7}
(United States) C Eubanks	7^{7}	4	6
7	(Kazakhstan) A Bublik	6^{5}	6	3

Quarterfinals
1	(Italy) J Sinner	6	6^{1}	7^{7}
(Germany) J-L Struff	2	7^{7}	6^{3}
(China) Z Zhang	6	4	7
(United States) C Eubanks	4	6	5

Semifinals
1	(Italy) J Sinner	6	7^{7}
(China) Z Zhang	4	6^{3}

=== Bottom half ===
First round
5	(Poland) H Hurkacz	7	7^{7}
(Italy) F Cobolli	5	6^{2}
WC	(Brazil) J Fonseca	4	4
Q	(Australia) J Duckworth	6	6
SE	(Italy) M Berrettini	7^{7}	6
Q	(United States) A Michelsen	6^{5}	2
(United States) M Giron	6	7^{7}
4	A Rublev	4	6^{5}
8	(Canada) F Auger-Aliassime	4	3^{r}
WC	(Germany) D Koepfer	6	4
(France) A Fils	6	6
(Czech Republic) T Macháč	4	4
(Serbia) M Kecmanović	6^{6}	6^{5}
(Italy) L Sonego	7^{8}	7^{7}
Q	(Germany) O Otte	7^{7}	3	4
2	(Germany) A Zverev	6^{5}	6	6

Second round
5	(Poland) H Hurkacz	7^{7}	6
Q	(Australia) J Duckworth	6^{3}	4
SE	(Italy) M Berrettini	6	4	3
(United States) M Giron	3	6	6
WC	(Germany) D Koepfer	3	4
(France) A Fils	6	6
(Italy) L Sonego	4	6^{5}
2	(Germany) A Zverev	6	7^{7}

Quarterfinals
5	(Poland) H Hurkacz	7^{7}	6
(United States) M Giron	6^{5}	4
(France) A Fils	7^{7}	3	4
2	(Germany) A Zverev	6^{5}	6	6

Semifinals
5	(Poland) H Hurkacz	7^{7}	6
2	(Germany) A Zverev	6^{2}	4

== Qualifying ==
=== Seeds ===
1. (France) Corentin Moutet (qualifying competition)
2. (Kazakhstan) Alexander Shevchenko (first round)
3. (United States) Alex Michelsen (qualified)
4. (Czech Republic) Jakub Menšík (first round)
5. (Spain) Roberto Bautista Agut (qualifying competition)
6. (France) Constant Lestienne (qualifying competition)
7. (Germany) Yannick Hanfmann (qualifying competition)
8. Aslan Karatsev (first round)

=== Qualifiers ===
1. (Australia) James Duckworth
2. (Australia) Max Purcell
3. (United States) Alex Michelsen
4. (Germany) Oscar Otte

=== Draw ===
==== First qualifier ====
First round
1	(France) Corentin Moutet	6	6
(Monaco) Valentin Vacherot	2	2
(Australia) James Duckworth	6	4	6
8	Aslan Karatsev	3	6	4

Qualifying competition
1	(France) Corentin Moutet	1	6^{5}
(Australia) James Duckworth	6	7^{7}

==== Second qualifier ====
First round
2	(Kazakhstan) Alexander Shevchenko	3	2
(Australia) Max Purcell	6	6
(France) Pierre-Hugues Herbert	6^{2}	6^{4}
5	(Spain) Roberto Bautista Agut	7^{7}	7^{7}

Qualifying competition
(Australia) Max Purcell	6	6
5	(Spain) Roberto Bautista Agut	4	4

==== Third qualifier ====
First round
3	(United States) Alex Michelsen	7	6
WC	(Germany) Max Hans Rehberg	5	4
(Australia) Adam Walton	2	3
7	(Germany) Yannick Hanfmann	6	6

Qualifying competition
3	(United States) Alex Michelsen	6	6
7	(Germany) Yannick Hanfmann	3	2

==== Fourth qualifier ====
First round
4	(Czech Republic) Jakub Menšík	2	3
WC	(Germany) Oscar Otte	6	6
WC	(Germany) Louis Wessels	3	7^{7}	4
6	(France) Constant Lestienne	6	6^{4}	6

Qualifying competition
WC	(Germany) Oscar Otte	7^{7}	6
6	(France) Constant Lestienne	6^{2}	1
