= 2024 Carlos Alcaraz tennis season =

Tennis player season

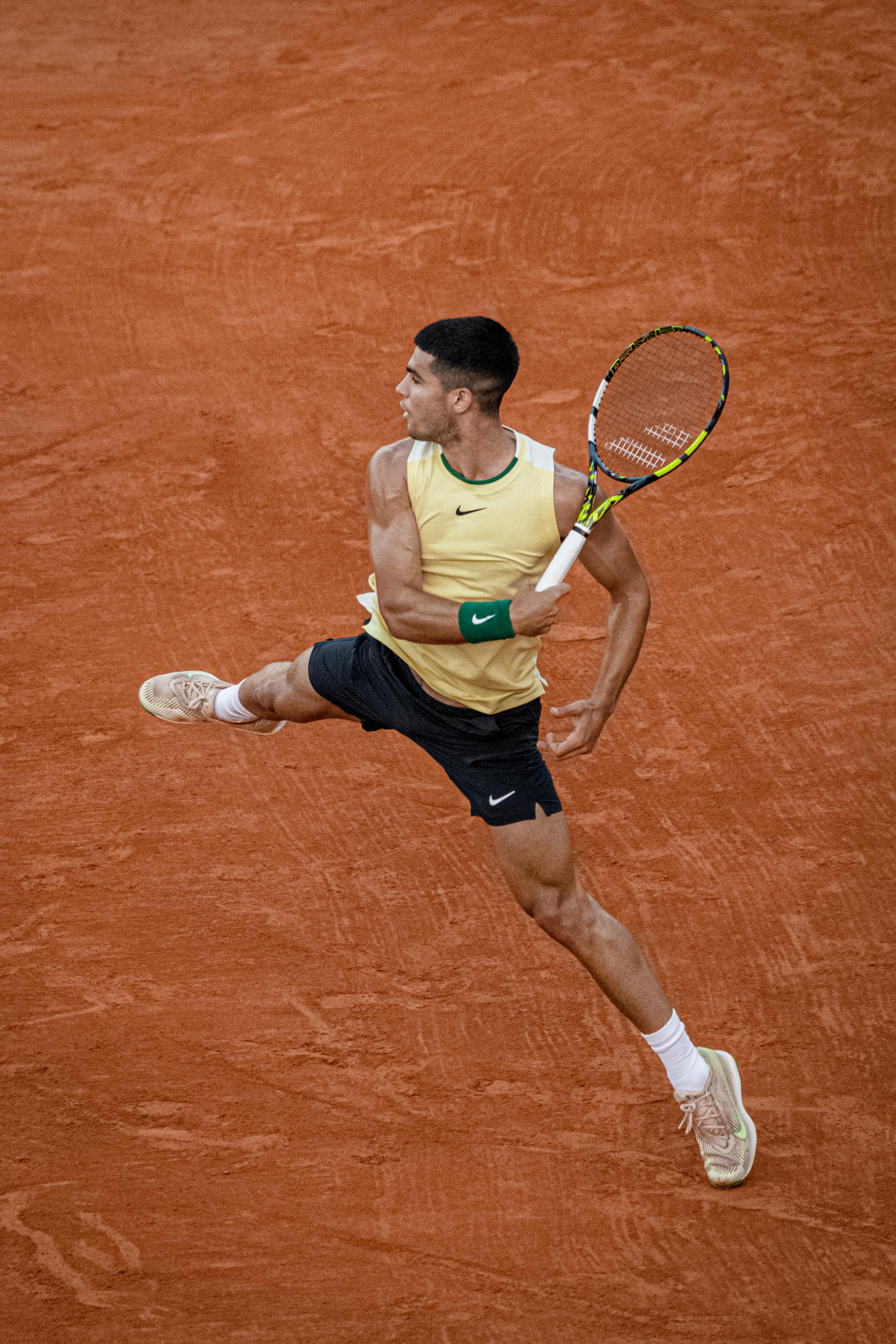
- Alcaraz at the 2024 Argentina Open
- Full name: Carlos Alcaraz Garfia
- Country: Spain
- Calendar prize money: $10,358,429

Singles
- Season record: 54–13 (80.6%)
- Calendar titles: 4
- Year-end ranking: No. 3
- Ranking change from previous year: ▼1

Grand Slam & significant results
- Australian Open: QF
- French Open: W
- Wimbledon: W
- US Open: 2R

Doubles
- Season record: 4–2 (66.67%)
- Ranking change from previous year: Steady

Davis Cup
- Davis Cup: QF

Injuries
- Injuries: Lateral sprain of right ankle (February 20); Injury to pronator teres of right arm (April 9)

The 2024 Carlos Alcaraz tennis season officially began on 14 January 2024, with the start of the Australian Open in Melbourne. Carlos Alcaraz won his first Roland-Garros title and his second Wimbledon title, in total his third and fourth major titles.

Alcaraz's 2024 season was featured in Carlos Alcaraz: My Way, a docuseries released on Netflix in 2025.

During this season, Alcaraz:

- Won his first French Open title (third major title overall)
- Won his second Wimbledon title (fourth major title overall)
- Became the youngest player to win the Channel Slam
- Became the first player in Open Era history to win his first three majors on three different surfaces
- Won his fifth Masters 1000 title
- Became the youngest Olympic finalist in men's singles
- Became the first man ever to win ATP 500 tournaments on all three surfaces
- Recorded his 200th career victory, becoming the second-fastest man in Open Era history to do so

== Yearly summary ==
=== Early hard court season ===
==== Australian Open ====
Alcaraz began his 2024 campaign at the Australian Open. His third round opponent, wild card Jerry Shang, retired at the start of the third set. Alcaraz therefore moved into the fourth round, marking his most successful run at the Australian Open at that date. He cruised into the quarterfinals after beating Miomir Kecmanović in straight sets. At the age of 20 years, 8 months and 15 days, Alcaraz became the fourth-youngest man in Open Era history to reach all four major quarterfinals. However, he lost in the quarterfinals to sixth seed Alexander Zverev.

=== Golden Swing ===
==== Argentina Open ====
In February, Alcaraz entered the Argentina Open as the defending champion. He won his first two matches in straight sets before losing to Nicolás Jarry in straight sets in the semifinals.

==== Rio Open ====
The following week, Alcaraz retired two games into his first match at the Rio Open. He had injured his ankle in the first game after playing just two points. He later announced the injury was a lateral sprain to his right ankle, but said he would miss just "a few days" of play and planned to compete at Las Vegas and Indian Wells.

=== Sunshine Double tournaments ===
==== Indian Wells ====
As defending champion at Indian Wells, Alcaraz came back into form, defeating Matteo Arnaldi, Félix Auger-Aliassime, Fábián Marozsán, and Alexander Zverev to reach the semifinals with just one dropped set. In the semifinals, Alcaraz recovered from a first-set breadstick to defeat Jannik Sinner 1–6, 6–3, 6–2. This victory levelled the Alcaraz–Sinner rivalry at 4–4 and ended Sinner's 19 match win streak. Alcaraz then successfully defended his title by defeating Daniil Medvedev in the final, earning him his first title since Wimbledon 2023. This would prove to be the only Masters event at which Alcaraz advanced beyond the quarterfinals all year.

==== Miami Open ====
At the Miami Open, Alcaraz defeated Roberto Carballés Baena, Gaël Monfils, and Lorenzo Musetti in straight sets, but lost to Grigor Dimitrov in the quarterfinals, ending his hopes of achieving the Sunshine Double.

=== Clay season ===
Alcaraz withdrew from both the Monte-Carlo Masters and the Barcelona Open due to an injury to the pronator teres of his right arm.

==== Madrid Open ====
Alcaraz returned to competition as the two-time defending champion in Madrid, defeating Alexander Shevchenko, Thiago Seyboth Wild, and Jan-Lennard Struff, before losing to Andrey Rublev in the quarterfinals. He subsequently withdrew from the Italian Open due to continued discomfort in his forearm.

==== French Open ====
Alcaraz returned to play at the French Open with a compression sleeve on his right arm. After his first round victory against J. J. Wolf, Alcaraz admitted, "I'm still feeling weird or afraid to hit every forehand." He nevertheless reached the semifinals, where he defeated second seed Jannik Sinner in five sets. Despite the length of the match, this is not generally considered one of their higher quality encounters. Alcaraz then defeated fourth seed Alexander Zverev, also in five sets, to claim the title. This was Alcaraz's first title at Roland Garros and his third major title overall. He became the first man in Open Era history to win his first three major titles on three different surfaces, as well as the youngest man to win major titles on all three surfaces.

=== Grass season ===
==== Queen's Club Championships ====
Alcaraz began his grass court season at the Queen's Club Championships, where he was the defending champion. He defeated Francisco Cerúndolo in the first round, but was upset in straight sets by Jack Draper in the second.

==== Wimbledon ====
Alcaraz also entered Wimbledon as the defending champion. He had a difficult encounter with Frances Tiafoe in the third round. Tiafoe was close to breaking Alcaraz and serving for the match in the fourth set; however, Alcaraz held serve from 0–30 and won the match in five sets. Alcaraz won the rest of his matches with relative ease to reach his second consecutive Wimbledon final against Novak Djokovic. Alcaraz sailed through the first two sets of the final 6–2, 6–2. He then lost three match points on his serve in the third set, but recovered to win it in a tiebreak. This was Alcaraz's second title at Wimbledon and his fourth major title overall. With this title, Alcaraz tied Mats Wilander and Björn Borg's record for the most men's singles major titles won by age 21. He also improved his grass court win percentage to the best in the Open Era at that time, at 89%.

=== Olympic Games ===
Alcaraz returned to the Roland Garros stadium eight weeks after his French Open victory to participate for Spain in the 2024 Summer Olympic Games.

==== Olympic doubles ====
Alcaraz entered the men's doubles competition in a heavily publicised partnership with Rafael Nadal. Alcaraz and Nadal defeated the Argentinians Máximo González and Andrés Molteni, and the Dutchmen Tallon Griekspoor and Wesley Koolhof, in the first and second rounds. They lost to the eventual silver-medallists, Americans Austin Krajicek and Rajeev Ram, in the quarterfinals. This was Nadal's last match on Court Philippe-Chatrier.

==== Olympic singles ====
Alcaraz defeated Hady Habib, Tallon Griekspoor, Roman Safiullin, Tommy Paul and Felix Auger-Aliassime to reach the final without dropping a set. Alcaraz entered the final as the significant favorite to win against Novak Djokovic, whom he had demolished at Wimbledon. However, he lost to him in a straight sets match decided by two tiebreaks; despite Alcaraz holding eight break points in the first set, neither man was ever broken on serve. Alcaraz therefore secured a silver medal for Spain.

=== North American hard court swing ===
Alcaraz withdrew from the Canadian Open to allow himself time to recover from the Olympics.

==== Cincinnati Open ====
Alcaraz received a bye through to the second round of the Cincinnati Open. He was drawn against Gaël Monfils in the first round. Alcaraz secured the first set 6–4. The second set proceeded to a tiebreak in which Alcaraz found himself down 1–3 before the players were forced off court due to rain. The match resumed the next day; Alcaraz lost the tiebreak and subsequently the match. After being broken in the third set, Alcaraz smashed a racquet on court for the first time in his career. This generated significant media coverage, particularly in Spain, where Rafael Nadal's habit of never damaging racquets was well-known. Sportswriter Patrick Redford likened it to "watching a puppy smoke a cigarette". Alcaraz delivered a public apology.

==== US Open ====
Alcaraz then entered the US Open, where he was bidding to become the third man in the Open Era to win the French Open, Wimbledon, and the US Open in the same year. Alcaraz defeated qualifier Li Tu in the first round. He was then defeated in straight sets by 74th-ranked Botic van de Zandschulp in the second round, in what Andy Roddick described as "one of the craziest losses I've seen". This was Alcaraz's earliest loss in a major since Wimbledon 2021, when he had been eighteen years old. In his media conference following the match, Alcaraz said, "I'm not doing well mentally, I'm not strong. I don't know how to control myself when faced with problems and I don't know how to handle it. I have to see exactly what happened, or what's going on with me."

=== Team competitions ===
==== Davis Cup ====
Alcaraz joined the Spanish team as his country's top-ranked singles player for the group stage of the Davis Cup, where Spain were drawn against the Czech Republic and France. Alcaraz played two singles matches. He recorded a win against Tomáš Macháč after Macháč retired in the third set, and defeated Ugo Humbert in straight sets. Alcaraz also formed a successful doubles partnership with Marcel Granollers to defeat Jakub Menšik and Adam Pavlásek.

==== Laver Cup ====
Alcaraz then made his debut for Team Europe at the 2024 Laver Cup. On Day One, he played doubles with Alexander Zverev, losing to Taylor Fritz and Ben Shelton of Team World. On Day Two, Alcaraz recorded a singles victory against Shelton. On Day Three, Alcaraz played doubles with Casper Ruud, winning against Shelton and Frances Tiafoe. He then played the final singles match of the tournament against Fritz, which he won in straight sets, thus securing the Laver Cup for Team Europe. Alcaraz won a combined eight points across this edition of the Laver Cup, the most won by any player in any single year of the tournament's history.

=== Asian hard court swing ===
==== China Open ====
Alcaraz returned to individual competition at the China Open in Beijing. He defeated Giovanni Mpetshi Perricard, Tallon Griekspoor, Karen Khachanov, and Daniil Medvedev without dropping a set. With his victory against Griekspoor, Alcaraz recorded his 200th career victory, becoming the second-fastest man in Open Era history to achieve this milestone relative to total number of matches played. In the final, Alcaraz defeated defending champion Jannik Sinner in three sets. Alcaraz won seven consecutive points in a third-set tiebreak to clinch the title. At three hours and twenty-one minutes, this became the longest match in the history of the tournament. It was Alcaraz's third encounter with Sinner in 2024, and his third victory, snapping Sinner's 15-match win streak. With this win, Alcaraz reclaimed the world No. 2 ranking from Alexander Zverev. He also became the first player in ATP Tour history to win an ATP 500 singles title on every surface – clay, grass and hard court.

==== Shanghai Open ====
Alcaraz then entered the Shanghai Open, where he defeated Shang Juncheng, Wu Yibing, and Gaël Monfils in straight sets. He lost to 33rd-ranked Tomáš Macháč in straight sets in the quarterfinals, ending his own 12-match win streak.

=== Indoor hard court season ===
==== Paris Masters ====
Alcaraz started his campaign at the Paris Masters with a win against Nicolás Jarry, before losing in three sets to Ugo Humbert in the round of sixteen. Following this tournament he lost the world No. 2 ranking once again to Alexander Zverev, the champion.

==== ATP Finals ====
Alcaraz was reportedly unwell during the ATP Finals but did not withdraw, beating Andrey Rublev but losing in straight sets to Zverev and Casper Ruud to exit the tournament in the round-robin stage.

==== Davis Cup ====
Alcaraz reunited with the Spanish team in Málaga for the Davis Cup quarterfinals against the Netherlands. He won his singles match against Tallon Griekspoor to level the tie at 1–1, but then lost in doubles alongside Marcel Granollers to Wesley Koolhof and Botic van de Zandschulp. Spain were knocked out of the 2024 Davis Cup, ending Alcaraz's season and sending compatriot Rafael Nadal into retirement. Alcaraz became the first man to finish the year ranked as low as world No. 3 after winning two majors that season.

== All matches ==
This table chronicles all the matches of Carlos Alcaraz in 2024

Key
W	F	SF	QF	#R	RR	Q#	P#	DNQ	A	Z#	PO	G	S	B	NMS	NTI	P	NH

(W) winner; (F) finalist; (SF) semifinalist; (QF) quarterfinalist; (#R) rounds 4, 3, 2, 1; (RR) round-robin stage; (Q#) qualification round; (P#) preliminary round; (DNQ) did not qualify; (A) absent; (Z#) Davis/Fed Cup Zonal Group (with number indication) or (PO) play-off; (G) gold, (S) silver or (B) bronze Olympic/Paralympic medal; (NMS) not a Masters tournament; (NTI) not a Tier I tournament; (P) postponed; (NH) not held; (SR) strike rate (events won / competed); (W–L) win–loss record.
To avoid confusion and double counting, these charts are updated at the conclusion of a tournament or when the player's participation has ended.

=== Singles matches ===
Tournament	Match	Round	Opponent (seed or key)	Rank	Result	Score
Australian Open; Melbourne, Australia; Grand Slam tournament Hard, outdoor 14 – 28 January 2024
Australian Open; Melbourne, Australia; Grand Slam tournament Hard, outdoor 14 – 28 January 2024	1 / 199	1R	(France) Richard Gasquet	131	Win	7–6^{(7–5)}, 6–1, 6–2
Australian Open; Melbourne, Australia; Grand Slam tournament Hard, outdoor 14 – 28 January 2024	2 / 200	2R	(Italy) Lorenzo Sonego	46	Win	6–4, 6–7^{(3–7)}, 6–3, 7–6^{(7–3)}
Australian Open; Melbourne, Australia; Grand Slam tournament Hard, outdoor 14 – 28 January 2024	3 / 201	3R	(China) Shang Juncheng (WC)	140	Win	6–1, 6–1, 1–0 Ret.
Australian Open; Melbourne, Australia; Grand Slam tournament Hard, outdoor 14 – 28 January 2024	4 / 202	4R	(Serbia) Miomir Kecmanović	60	Win	6–4, 6–4, 6–0
Australian Open; Melbourne, Australia; Grand Slam tournament Hard, outdoor 14 – 28 January 2024	5 / 203	QF	(Germany) Alexander Zverev (6)	6	Loss	1–6, 3–6, 7–6^{(7–2)}, 4–6
Argentina Open; Buenos Aires, Argentina; ATP 250; Clay, outdoor 12 – 18 February 2024
Argentina Open; Buenos Aires, Argentina; ATP 250; Clay, outdoor 12 – 18 February 2024	–	1R	Bye			
Argentina Open; Buenos Aires, Argentina; ATP 250; Clay, outdoor 12 – 18 February 2024	6 / 204	2R	(Argentina) Camilo Ugo Carabelli (Q)	134	Win	6–2, 7–5
Argentina Open; Buenos Aires, Argentina; ATP 250; Clay, outdoor 12 – 18 February 2024	7 / 205	QF	(Italy) Andrea Vavassori (Q)	152	Win	7–6, 6–1
Argentina Open; Buenos Aires, Argentina; ATP 250; Clay, outdoor 12 – 18 February 2024	8 / 206	SF	(Chile) Nicolás Jarry (3)	21	Loss	6–7^{(2–7)}, 3–6
Rio Open; Rio de Janeiro, Brazil; ATP 500; Clay, outdoor 19 – 25 February 2024
Rio Open; Rio de Janeiro, Brazil; ATP 500; Clay, outdoor 19 – 25 February 2024	9 / 207	1R	(Brazil) Thiago Monteiro (WC)	117	Loss	1–1 Ret.
Indian Wells Open; Indian Wells, United States; ATP 1000; Hard, outdoor 6 – 17 March 2024
Indian Wells Open; Indian Wells, United States; ATP 1000; Hard, outdoor 6 – 17 March 2024	–	1R	Bye			
Indian Wells Open; Indian Wells, United States; ATP 1000; Hard, outdoor 6 – 17 March 2024	10 / 208	2R	(Italy) Matteo Arnaldi	40	Win	6–7^{(5–7)}. 6–0, 6–1
Indian Wells Open; Indian Wells, United States; ATP 1000; Hard, outdoor 6 – 17 March 2024	11 / 209	3R	(Canada) Félix Auger-Aliassime (31)	31	Win	6–2, 6–3
Indian Wells Open; Indian Wells, United States; ATP 1000; Hard, outdoor 6 – 17 March 2024	12 / 210	4R	(Hungary) Fábián Marozsán	58	Win	6–3, 6–3
Indian Wells Open; Indian Wells, United States; ATP 1000; Hard, outdoor 6 – 17 March 2024	13 / 211	QF	(Germany) Alexander Zverev (6)	6	Win	6–3, 6–1
Indian Wells Open; Indian Wells, United States; ATP 1000; Hard, outdoor 6 – 17 March 2024	14 / 212	SF	(Italy) Jannik Sinner (3)	3	Win	1–6, 6–3, 6–2
Indian Wells Open; Indian Wells, United States; ATP 1000; Hard, outdoor 6 – 17 March 2024	15 / 213	W	Daniil Medvedev (Note: Russian and Belarus players are not allowed to compete under the name or flag of their country following the Russian invasion of Ukraine.) (4)	4	Win (1)	7–6^{(7–5)}, 6–1
Miami Open; Miami Gardens, United States; ATP 1000; Hard, outdoor 20 – 31 March 2024
Miami Open; Miami Gardens, United States; ATP 1000; Hard, outdoor 20 – 31 March 2024	–	1R	Bye			
Miami Open; Miami Gardens, United States; ATP 1000; Hard, outdoor 20 – 31 March 2024	16 / 214	2R	(Spain) Roberto Carballés Baena	64	Win	6–2, 6–1
Miami Open; Miami Gardens, United States; ATP 1000; Hard, outdoor 20 – 31 March 2024	17 / 215	3R	(France) Gaël Monfils	47	Win	6–2, 6–4
Miami Open; Miami Gardens, United States; ATP 1000; Hard, outdoor 20 – 31 March 2024	18 / 216	4R	(Italy) Lorenzo Musetti (23)	24	Win	6–3, 6–3
Miami Open; Miami Gardens, United States; ATP 1000; Hard, outdoor 20 – 31 March 2024	19 / 217	QF	(Bulgaria) Grigor Dimitrov (11)	12	Loss	2–6, 4–6
Monte-Carlo Masters; Roquebrune-Cap-Martin, France; ATP 1000; Clay, outdoor 7 – 14 April 2024
Monte-Carlo Masters; Roquebrune-Cap-Martin, France; ATP 1000; Clay, outdoor 7 – 14 April 2024	Withdrew					
Barcelona Open; Barcelona, Spain; ATP 500; Clay, outdoor 15 – 21 April 2024
Barcelona Open; Barcelona, Spain; ATP 500; Clay, outdoor 15 – 21 April 2024	Withdrew					
Madrid Open; Madrid, Spain; ATP 1000; Clay, outdoor 24 April – 5 May 2024
Madrid Open; Madrid, Spain; ATP 1000; Clay, outdoor 24 April – 5 May 2024	–	1R	Bye			
Madrid Open; Madrid, Spain; ATP 1000; Clay, outdoor 24 April – 5 May 2024	20 / 218	2R	(Kazakhstan) Alexander Shevchenko	59	Win	6–2, 6–1
Madrid Open; Madrid, Spain; ATP 1000; Clay, outdoor 24 April – 5 May 2024	21 / 219	3R	(Brazil) Thiago Seyboth Wild	63	Win	6–3, 6–3
Madrid Open; Madrid, Spain; ATP 1000; Clay, outdoor 24 April – 5 May 2024	22 / 220	4R	(Germany) Jan-Lennard Struff (23)	24	Win	6–3, 6–7^{(5–7)}, 7–6^{(7–4)}
Madrid Open; Madrid, Spain; ATP 1000; Clay, outdoor 24 April – 5 May 2024	23 / 221	QF	Andrey Rublev (7)	8	Loss	6–4, 3–6, 2–6
Italian Open; Rome, Italy; ATP 1000; Clay, outdoor 8 – 19 May 2024
Italian Open; Rome, Italy; ATP 1000; Clay, outdoor 8 – 19 May 2024	Withdrew					
French Open; Paris, France; Grand Slam tournament Clay, outdoor 26 May – 9 June 2024
French Open; Paris, France; Grand Slam tournament Clay, outdoor 26 May – 9 June 2024	24 / 222	1R	(United States) J. J. Wolf (LL)	107	Win	6–1, 6–2, 6–1
French Open; Paris, France; Grand Slam tournament Clay, outdoor 26 May – 9 June 2024	25 / 223	2R	(Netherlands) Jesper de Jong (Q)	176	Win	6–3, 6–4, 2–6, 6–2
French Open; Paris, France; Grand Slam tournament Clay, outdoor 26 May – 9 June 2024	26 / 224	3R	(United States) Sebastian Korda (27)	28	Win	6–4, 7–6^{(7–5)}, 6–3
French Open; Paris, France; Grand Slam tournament Clay, outdoor 26 May – 9 June 2024	27 / 225	4R	(Canada) Félix Auger-Aliassime (21)	21	Win	6–3, 6–3, 6–1
French Open; Paris, France; Grand Slam tournament Clay, outdoor 26 May – 9 June 2024	28 / 226	QF	(Greece) Stefanos Tsitsipas (9)	9	Win	6–3, 7–6^{(7–3)}, 6–4
French Open; Paris, France; Grand Slam tournament Clay, outdoor 26 May – 9 June 2024	29 / 227	SF	(Italy) Jannik Sinner (2)	2	Win	2–6, 6–3, 3–6, 6–4, 6–3
French Open; Paris, France; Grand Slam tournament Clay, outdoor 26 May – 9 June 2024	30 / 228	W	(Germany) Alexander Zverev (4)	4	Win (2)	6–3, 2–6, 5–7, 6–1, 6–2
Queen's Club Championships; London, UK; ATP 500; Grass, outdoor 17 – 23 June 2024
Queen's Club Championships; London, UK; ATP 500; Grass, outdoor 17 – 23 June 2024	31 / 229	1R	(Argentina) Francisco Cerúndolo	26	Win	6–1, 7–5
Queen's Club Championships; London, UK; ATP 500; Grass, outdoor 17 – 23 June 2024	32 / 230	2R	(United Kingdom) Jack Draper	31	Loss	6–7^{(3–7)}, 3–6
Wimbledon; London, United Kingdom; Grand Slam tournament Grass, outdoor 1 – 14 July 2024
Wimbledon; London, United Kingdom; Grand Slam tournament Grass, outdoor 1 – 14 July 2024	33/ 231	1R	(Estonia) Mark Lajal (Q)	269	Win	7–6^{(7–3)}, 7–5, 6–2
Wimbledon; London, United Kingdom; Grand Slam tournament Grass, outdoor 1 – 14 July 2024	34/ 232	2R	(Australia) Aleksandar Vukic	69	Win	7–6^{(7–5)}, 6–2, 6–2
Wimbledon; London, United Kingdom; Grand Slam tournament Grass, outdoor 1 – 14 July 2024	35 / 233	3R	(United States) Frances Tiafoe (29)	29	Win	5–7, 6–2, 4–6, 7–6^{(7–2)}, 6–2
Wimbledon; London, United Kingdom; Grand Slam tournament Grass, outdoor 1 – 14 July 2024	36 / 234	4R	(France) Ugo Humbert (16)	16	Win	6–3, 6–4, 1–6, 7–5
Wimbledon; London, United Kingdom; Grand Slam tournament Grass, outdoor 1 – 14 July 2024	37 / 235	QF	(United States) Tommy Paul (12)	13	Win	5–7, 6–4, 6–2, 6–2
Wimbledon; London, United Kingdom; Grand Slam tournament Grass, outdoor 1 – 14 July 2024	38 / 236	SF	Daniil Medvedev (5)	5	Win	6–7^{(1–7)}, 6–3, 6–4, 6–4
Wimbledon; London, United Kingdom; Grand Slam tournament Grass, outdoor 1 – 14 July 2024	39 / 237	W	(Serbia) Novak Djokovic (2)	2	Win (3)	6–2, 6–2, 7–6^{(7–4)}
Summer Olympics; Paris, France; Olympics; Clay, outdoor 27 July – 4 August 2024
Summer Olympics; Paris, France; Olympics; Clay, outdoor 27 July – 4 August 2024	40 / 238	1R	(Lebanon) Hady Habib (Alt)	274	Win	6–3, 6–1
Summer Olympics; Paris, France; Olympics; Clay, outdoor 27 July – 4 August 2024	41 / 239	2R	(Netherlands) Tallon Griekspoor	28	Win	6–1, 7–6^{(7–3)}
Summer Olympics; Paris, France; Olympics; Clay, outdoor 27 July – 4 August 2024	42 / 240	3R	Roman Safiullin	66	Win	6–4, 6–2
Summer Olympics; Paris, France; Olympics; Clay, outdoor 27 July – 4 August 2024	43 / 241	QF	(United States) Tommy Paul (9)	13	Win	6–3, 7–6^{(9–7)}
Summer Olympics; Paris, France; Olympics; Clay, outdoor 27 July – 4 August 2024	44 / 242	SF	(Canada) Félix Auger-Aliassime (13)	19	Win	6–1, 6–1
Summer Olympics; Paris, France; Olympics; Clay, outdoor 27 July – 4 August 2024	45 / 243	S 🥈	(Serbia) Novak Djokovic (1)	2	Loss	6–7^{(3–7)}, 6–7^{(2–7)}
Canadian Open; Montreal, Canada; ATP 1000; Hard, outdoor 6 – 12 August 2024
Canadian Open; Montreal, Canada; ATP 1000; Hard, outdoor 6 – 12 August 2024	Withdrew					
Cincinnati Open; Cincinnati, USA; ATP 1000; Hard, outdoor 12 – 19 August 2024
Cincinnati Open; Cincinnati, USA; ATP 1000; Hard, outdoor 12 – 19 August 2024	–	1R	Bye			
Cincinnati Open; Cincinnati, USA; ATP 1000; Hard, outdoor 12 – 19 August 2024	46 / 244	2R	(France) Gaël Monfils	46	Loss	6–4, 6–7^{(5–7)}, 4–6
US Open; New York City, United States; Grand Slam tournament Hard, outdoor 26 August – 8 September 2024
US Open; New York City, United States; Grand Slam tournament Hard, outdoor 26 August – 8 September 2024	47 / 245	1R	(Australia) Li Tu (Q)	186	Win	6–2, 4–6, 6–3, 6–1
US Open; New York City, United States; Grand Slam tournament Hard, outdoor 26 August – 8 September 2024	48 / 246	2R	(Netherlands) Botic van de Zandschulp	74	Loss	1–6, 5–7, 4–6
Davis Cup Finals; Group stage Valencia, Spain; Davis Cup; Hard, indoor 10 – 15 September 2024
Davis Cup Finals; Group stage Valencia, Spain; Davis Cup; Hard, indoor 10 – 15 September 2024	49 / 247	RR	(Czech Republic) Tomáš Macháč	35	Win	6–7^{(3–7)}, 6–1, 0–0 Ret.
Davis Cup Finals; Group stage Valencia, Spain; Davis Cup; Hard, indoor 10 – 15 September 2024	50 / 248	RR	(France) Ugo Humbert	18	Win	6–3, 6–3
Laver Cup; Berlin, Germany; Laver Cup; Hard, indoor 20 – 22 September 2024
Laver Cup; Berlin, Germany; Laver Cup; Hard, indoor 20 – 22 September 2024	51 / 249	Day 2	(United States) Ben Shelton	17	Win	6–4, 6–4
Laver Cup; Berlin, Germany; Laver Cup; Hard, indoor 20 – 22 September 2024	52 / 250	Day 3	(United States) Taylor Fritz	7	Win	6–2, 7–5
China Open; Beijing, China; ATP 500; Hard, outdoor 26 September – 2 October 2024
China Open; Beijing, China; ATP 500; Hard, outdoor 26 September – 2 October 2024	53 / 251	1R	(France) Giovanni Mpetshi Perricard	51	Win	6–4, 6–4
China Open; Beijing, China; ATP 500; Hard, outdoor 26 September – 2 October 2024	54 / 252	2R	(Netherlands) Tallon Griekspoor	39	Win	6–1, 6–2
China Open; Beijing, China; ATP 500; Hard, outdoor 26 September – 2 October 2024	55 / 253	QF	Karen Khachanov (7)	27	Win	7–5, 6–2
China Open; Beijing, China; ATP 500; Hard, outdoor 26 September – 2 October 2024	56 / 254	SF	Daniil Medvedev (3)	5	Win	7–5, 6–3
China Open; Beijing, China; ATP 500; Hard, outdoor 26 September – 2 October 2024	57 / 255	W	(Italy) Jannik Sinner	1	Win (4)	6–7^{(6–8)}, 6–4, 7–6^{(7–3)}
Shanghai Masters; Shanghai, China; ATP 1000; Hard, outdoor 2 – 13 October 2024
Shanghai Masters; Shanghai, China; ATP 1000; Hard, outdoor 2 – 13 October 2024	–	1R	Bye			
Shanghai Masters; Shanghai, China; ATP 1000; Hard, outdoor 2 – 13 October 2024	58 / 256	2R	(China) Shang Juncheng	51	Win	6–2, 6–2
Shanghai Masters; Shanghai, China; ATP 1000; Hard, outdoor 2 – 13 October 2024	59 / 257	3R	(China) Wu Yibing (WC)	560	Win	7–6^{(7–5)}, 6–3
Shanghai Masters; Shanghai, China; ATP 1000; Hard, outdoor 2 – 13 October 2024	60 / 258	4R	(France) Gaël Monfils	46	Win	6–4, 7–5
Shanghai Masters; Shanghai, China; ATP 1000; Hard, outdoor 2 – 13 October 2024	61 / 259	QF	(Czech Republic) Tomáš Macháč (30)	33	Loss	6–7^{(5–7)}, 5–7
Paris Masters; Paris, France; ATP 1000; Hard, indoor 28 October – 3 November 2024
Paris Masters; Paris, France; ATP 1000; Hard, indoor 28 October – 3 November 2024	–	1R	Bye			
Paris Masters; Paris, France; ATP 1000; Hard, indoor 28 October – 3 November 2024	62 / 260	2R	(Chile) Nicolás Jarry	37	Win	7–5, 6–1
Paris Masters; Paris, France; ATP 1000; Hard, indoor 28 October – 3 November 2024	63 / 261	3R	(France) Ugo Humbert (15)	18	Loss	1–6, 6–3, 5–7
ATP Finals; Turin, Italy; ATP Finals; Hard, indoor 10 – 17 November 2024
ATP Finals; Turin, Italy; ATP Finals; Hard, indoor 10 – 17 November 2024	64 / 262	RR	(Norway) Casper Ruud (6)	7	Loss	1–6, 5–7
ATP Finals; Turin, Italy; ATP Finals; Hard, indoor 10 – 17 November 2024	65 / 263	RR	Andrey Rublev (8)	8	Win	6–3, 7–6^{(10–8)}
ATP Finals; Turin, Italy; ATP Finals; Hard, indoor 10 – 17 November 2024	66 / 264	RR	(Germany) Alexander Zverev (2)	2	Loss	6–7^{(5–7)}, 4–6
Davis Cup Finals; Knockout stage Málaga, Spain; Davis Cup; Hard, indoor 19 – 24 November 2024
Davis Cup Finals; Knockout stage Málaga, Spain; Davis Cup; Hard, indoor 19 – 24 November 2024	67 / 265	QF	(Netherlands) Tallon Griekspoor	40	Win	7–6^{(7–0)}, 6–3

=== Doubles matches ===
Tournament	Match	Round	Opponents (seed or key)	Ranks	Result	Score
Summer Olympics; Paris, France; Olympics; Clay, outdoor 27 July – 4 August 2024; Partner: (Spain) Rafael Nadal
Summer Olympics; Paris, France; Olympics; Clay, outdoor 27 July – 4 August 2024; Partner: (Spain) Rafael Nadal	1 / 7	1R	(Argentina) Máximo González / (Argentina) Andrés Molteni (6)	16 / 12	Win	7–6^{(7–4)}, 6–4
Summer Olympics; Paris, France; Olympics; Clay, outdoor 27 July – 4 August 2024; Partner: (Spain) Rafael Nadal	2 / 8	2R	(Netherlands) Tallon Griekspoor / (Netherlands) Wesley Koolhof	113 / 20	Win	6–4, 6–7^{(2–7)}, [10–2]
Summer Olympics; Paris, France; Olympics; Clay, outdoor 27 July – 4 August 2024; Partner: (Spain) Rafael Nadal	3 / 9	QF	(United States) Austin Krajicek / (United States) Rajeev Ram (4)	18 / 5	Loss	2–6, 4–6
Davis Cup Finals; Group stage Valencia, Spain; Davis Cup; Hard, indoor 10 – 15 September 2024; Partner: (Spain) Marcel Granollers
Davis Cup Finals; Group stage Valencia, Spain; Davis Cup; Hard, indoor 10 – 15 September 2024; Partner: (Spain) Marcel Granollers	4 / 10	RR	(Czech Republic) Jakub Menšík / (Czech Republic) Adam Pavlásek	– / 41	Win	6–7^{(2–7)}, 6–3, 7–6^{(7–2)}
Laver Cup; Berlin, Germany; Laver Cup; Hard, indoor 20 – 22 September 2024; Partner: (Germany) Alexander Zverev (Day 1); (Norway) Casper Ruud (Day 3)
Laver Cup; Berlin, Germany; Laver Cup; Hard, indoor 20 – 22 September 2024; Partner: (Germany) Alexander Zverev (Day 1); (Norway) Casper Ruud (Day 3)	5 / 11	Day 1	(United States) Taylor Fritz / (United States) Ben Shelton	152 / 111	Loss	6–7^{(5–7)}, 4–6
Laver Cup; Berlin, Germany; Laver Cup; Hard, indoor 20 – 22 September 2024; Partner: (Germany) Alexander Zverev (Day 1); (Norway) Casper Ruud (Day 3)	6 / 12	Day 3	(United States) Ben Shelton / (United States) Frances Tiafoe	111 / –	Win	6–2, 7–6^{(8–6)}
Davis Cup Finals; Knockout phase Málaga, Spain; Davis Cup; Hard, indoor 19 – 24 November 2024; Partner: (Spain) Marcel Granollers
Davis Cup Finals; Knockout phase Málaga, Spain; Davis Cup; Hard, indoor 19 – 24 November 2024; Partner: (Spain) Marcel Granollers	7 / 13	QF	(Netherlands) Wesley Koolhof / (Netherlands) Botic van de Zandschulp	8 / 188	Loss	6–7^{(4–7)}, 6–7^{(3–7)}

== Exhibition matches ==
=== Singles ===
Tournament	Match	Round	Opponent (seed or key)	Rank	Result	Score
Riyadh Season Tennis Cup; Riyadh, Saudi Arabia Hard, outdoor 26 – 27 December 2023
Riyadh Season Tennis Cup; Riyadh, Saudi Arabia Hard, outdoor 26 – 27 December 2023	1	PO	(Serbia) Novak Djokovic	1	Win	4–6, 6–4, 6–4
Carlos Alcaraz Cup; Murcia, Spain Hard, indoor 28 December 2023
Carlos Alcaraz Cup; Murcia, Spain Hard, indoor 28 December 2023	2	PO	(Spain) Roberto Bautista Agut	57	Win	7–6^{(7–1)}, 1–6, [10–7]
Pre-Australian Open Charity match Melbourne, Australia Hard, outdoor 10 January 2024
Pre-Australian Open Charity match Melbourne, Australia Hard, outdoor 10 January 2024	3	PO	(Australia) Alex de Minaur	10	Loss	4–6, 7–5, [3–10]
Pre-Australian Open Charity match Melbourne, Australia Hard, outdoor 10 January 2024	4	PO	(Norway) Casper Ruud	11	Win	6–4, 6–2
The Netflix Slam; Las Vegas, United States Hard, indoor 3 March 2024
The Netflix Slam; Las Vegas, United States Hard, indoor 3 March 2024	5	PO	(Spain) Rafael Nadal	654	Win	3–6, 6–4, [14–12]
6 Kings Slam; Riyadh, Saudi Arabia Hard, indoor 16 – 19 October 2024
6 Kings Slam; Riyadh, Saudi Arabia Hard, indoor 16 – 19 October 2024	6	QF	(Denmark) Holger Rune	14	Win	6–4, 6–2
6 Kings Slam; Riyadh, Saudi Arabia Hard, indoor 16 – 19 October 2024	7	SF	(Spain) Rafael Nadal	153	Win	6–3, 6–3
6 Kings Slam; Riyadh, Saudi Arabia Hard, indoor 16 – 19 October 2024	8	F	(Italy) Jannik Sinner	1	Loss	7–6^{(7–5)}, 3–6, 3–6
The Garden Cup; New York, United States Hard, indoor 4 December 2024
The Garden Cup; New York, United States Hard, indoor 4 December 2024	9	PO	(United States) Ben Shelton	21	Win	4–6, 6–2, [7–4]
Charlotte Invitational; Charlotte, United States Hard, indoor 6 December 2024
Charlotte Invitational; Charlotte, United States Hard, indoor 6 December 2024	10	PO	(United States) Frances Tiafoe	18	Loss	5–7, 6–1, [11–9]

=== Doubles ===
Tournament	Match	Round	Opponent (seed or key)	Rank	Result	Score
The Fan Week Exhibition; New York City, United States Hard; 21 August 2024; Partner: (United States) Andre Agassi
The Fan Week Exhibition; New York City, United States Hard; 21 August 2024; Partner: (United States) Andre Agassi	1	PO	(Serbia) Novak Djokovic / (United States) John McEnroe	– / –	Loss	[8–10]

== Schedule ==
=== Singles schedule ===
Date	Tournament	Location	Tier	Surface	Prev. result	Prev. points	New points	Result
14 January 2024– 28 January 2024	Australian Open	Melbourne (AUS)	Grand Slam	Hard	A	0	400	Quarterfinals (lost to Alexander Zverev, 1–6, 3–6, 7–6^{(7–2)}, 4–6)
12 February 2024– 18 February 2024	Argentina Open	Buenos Aires (ARG)	250 Series	Clay	W	250	100	Semifinals (lost to Nicolás Jarry, 6–7^{(2–7)}, 3–6)
19 February 2024– 25 February 2024	Rio Open	Rio de Janeiro (BRA)	500 Series	Clay	F	300	0	First round (lost to Thiago Monteiro ret. 1–1)
6 March 2024– 17 March 2024	Indian Wells Open	Indian Wells (USA)	Masters 1000	Hard	W	1,000	1,000	Winner (defeated Daniil Medvedev 7–6^{(7–5)}, 6–1)
20 March 2024– 31 March 2024	Miami Open	Miami (USA)	Masters 1000	Hard	SF	360	200	Quarterfinals (lost to Grigor Dimitrov, 2–6, 4–6)
7 April 2024– 14 April 2024	Monte-Carlo Masters	Roquebrune-Cap-Martin (FRA)	Masters 1000	Clay	A	0	0	Withdrew
15 April 2024– 21 April 2024	Barcelona Open	Barcelona (ESP)	500 Series	Clay	W	500	0	Withdrew
24 April 2024– 5 May 2024	Madrid Open	Madrid (ESP)	Masters 1000	Clay	W	1000	200	Quarterfinals (lost to Andrey Rublev, 6–4, 3–6, 2–6)
8 May 2024– 19 May 2024	Italian Open	Rome (ITA)	Masters 1000	Clay	3R	45	0	Withdrew
26 May 2024– 9 June 2024	French Open	Paris (FRA)	Grand Slam	Clay	SF	720	2,000	Winner (defeated Alexander Zverev 6–3, 2–6, 5–7, 6–1, 6–2)
17 June 2024– 23 June 2024	Queen's Club Championships	London (GBR)	500 Series	Grass	W	500	50	Second round (lost to Jack Draper 6–7^{(3–7)}, 3–6)
1 July 2024– 14 July 2024	Wimbledon Championships	London (GBR)	Grand Slam	Grass	W	2000	2000	Winner (defeated Novak Djokovic 6–2, 6–2, 7–6^{(7–4)})
27 July 2024– 4 August 2024	Summer Olympics	Paris (FRA)	Olympic Games	Clay	NH	N/A	N/A	Final (lost to Novak Djokovic 6–7^{(3–7)}, 6–7^{(2–7)})
6 August 2024– 12 August 2024	Canadian Open	Montreal (CAN)	Masters 1000	Hard	QF	180	0	Withdrew
12 August 2024– 19 August 2024	Cincinnati Open	Cincinnati (USA)	Masters 1000	Hard	F	600	10	Second round (lost to Gaël Monfils 6–4, 6–7^{(5–7)}, 4–6)
26 August 2024– 8 September 2024	US Open	New York (USA)	Grand Slam	Hard	SF	720	50	Second round (lost to Botic van de Zandschulp 1–6, 5–7, 4–6)
11 September 2024– 15 September 2024	Davis Cup Finals Group stage	Valencia (ESP)	Davis Cup	Hard (i)	N/A	N/A	N/A	Progressed to finals knockout stage
26 September 2024– 2 October 2024	China Open	Beijing (CHN)	500 Series	Hard	SF	180	500	Winner (defeated Jannik Sinner 6–7^{(6–8)}, 6–4, 7–6^{(7–3)})
2 October 2024– 13 October 2024	Shanghai Masters	Shanghai (CHN)	Masters 1000	Hard	4R	90	200	Quarterfinals (lost to Tomáš Macháč 6–7^{(5–7)}, 5–7)
28 October 2024– 3 November 2024	Paris Masters	Paris (FRA)	Masters 1000	Hard (i)	2R	10	100	Third round (lost to Ugo Humbert 1–6, 6–3, 5–7)
10 November 2024– 17 November 2024	ATP Finals	Turin (ITA)	Tour Finals	Hard (i)	SF	400	200	Round robin (1 win – 2 losses)
19 November 2024– 24 November 2024	Davis Cup Finals Knockout stage	Málaga (ESP)	Davis Cup	Hard (i)	N/A	N/A	N/A	Quarterfinals ( Spain lost to Netherlands, 1–2)
Total year-end points (as of ATP Finals)						8,855	7,010	▼1,845
Total year-end points						8,855	7,010	difference
Source: Rankings breakdown

== Yearly records ==
=== Head-to-head matchups ===
Carlos Alcaraz has a 54–13 (80.6%) ATP match win–loss record in the 2024 season. His record against players who were part of the ATP rankings Top-10 at the time of their meetings is 12–5 (70.59%). Bold indicates player was ranked top 10 at the time of at least one meeting. The following list is ordered by number of wins:

- (Canada) Félix Auger-Aliassime 3–0
- (Netherlands) Tallon Griekspoor 3–0
- **Daniil Medvedev** 3–0
- **(Italy) Jannik Sinner** 3–0
- (China) Shang Juncheng 2–0
- (France) Ugo Humbert 2–1
- (France) Gaël Monfils 2–1
- **(Germany) Alexander Zverev** 2–2
- (Italy) Matteo Arnaldi 1–0
- (Spain) Roberto Carballés Baena 1–0
- (Argentina) Camilo Ugo Carabelli 1–0
- (Argentina) Francisco Cerúndolo 1–0
- **(United States) Taylor Fritz** 1–0
- (France) Richard Gasquet 1–0
- (Lebanon) Hady Habib 1–0
- (Netherlands) Jesper de Jong 1–0
- (Serbia) Miomir Kecmanović 1–0
- Karen Khachanov 1–0
- (United States) Sebastian Korda 1–0
- (Estonia) Mark Lajal 1–0
- (Hungary) Fábián Marozsán 1–0
- (Italy) Lorenzo Musetti 1–0
- (France) Giovanni Mpetshi Perricard 1–0
- (United States) Tommy Paul 1–0
- Roman Safiullin 1–0
- (Kazakhstan) Alexander Shevchenko 1–0
- (United States) Ben Shelton 1–0
- (Italy) Lorenzo Sonego 1–0
- (Germany) Jan-Lennard Struff 1–0
- (United States) Frances Tiafoe 1–0
- (Greece) **Stefanos Tsitsipas** 1–0
- (Australia) Li Tu 1–0
- (Italy) Andrea Vavassori 1–0
- (Australia) Aleksandar Vukic 1–0
- (Brazil) Thiago Seyboth Wild 1–0
- (France) Aleksandar Vukic 1–0
- (United States) J. J. Wolf 1–0
- (Chile) Wu Yibing 1–0
- (Serbia) **Novak Djokovic** 1–1
- (Chile) Nicolás Jarry 1–1
- (Czech Republic) Tomáš Macháč 1–1
- **Andrey Rublev** 1–1
- (Bulgaria) Grigor Dimitrov 0–1
- (United Kingdom) Jack Draper 0–1
- (Brazil) Thiago Monteiro 0–1
- **(Norway) Casper Ruud** 0–1
- (Netherlands) Botic van de Zandschulp 0–1

* Statistics correct as of 19 November 2024.

=== Top 10 record (12–5) ===
Category Grand Slam (5–1) ATP Finals (1–2) Olympics (0–1) Laver Cup (1–0) Masters 1000 (3–1) 500 Series (2–0) 250 Series (0–0)	Wins by surface Hard (7–3) Clay (3–2) Grass (2–0)	Wins by setting Outdoor (10–3) Indoor (2–2)

Result	W–L	Player	Rk	Event	Surface	Rd	Score	Rk	Ref
Loss	0–1	(Germany) Alexander Zverev	6	Australian Open, Australia	Hard	QF	1–6, 3–6, 7–6^{(7–2)}, 4–6	2	
Win	1–1	(Germany) Alexander Zverev	6	Indian Wells Open, United States	Hard	QF	6–3, 6–1	2	
Win	2–1	(Italy) Jannik Sinner	3	Indian Wells Open, United States	Hard	SF	1–6, 6–3, 6–2	2	
Win	3–1	Daniil Medvedev	4	Indian Wells Open, United States	Hard	F	7–6^{(7–5)}, 6–1	2	
Loss	3–2	Andrey Rublev	8	Madrid Open, Spain	Clay	QF	6–4, 3–6, 2–6	3	
Win	4–2	(Greece) Stefanos Tsitsipas	9	French Open, France	Clay	QF	6–3, 7–6^{(7–3)}, 6–4	3	
Win	5–2	(Italy) Jannik Sinner	2	French Open, France	Clay	SF	2–6, 6–3, 3–6, 6–4, 6–3	3	
Win	6–2	(Germany) Alexander Zverev	4	French Open, France	Clay	F	6–3, 2–6, 5–7, 6–1, 6–2	3	
Win	7–2	Daniil Medvedev	5	Wimbledon, United Kingdom	Grass	SF	6–7^{(1–7)}, 6–3, 6–4, 6–4	3	
Win	8–2	(Serbia) Novak Djokovic	2	Wimbledon, United Kingdom	Grass	F	6–2, 6–2, 7–6^{(7–4)}	3	
Loss	8–3	(Serbia) Novak Djokovic	2	Summer Olympics, France	Clay	F	6–7^{(3–7)}, 6–7^{(2–7)}	3	
Win	9–3	(United States) Taylor Fritz	7	Laver Cup, Germany	Hard (i)	RR	6–2, 7–5	3	
Win	10–3	Daniil Medvedev	5	China Open, China	Hard	SF	7–5, 6–3	3	
Win	11–3	(Italy) Jannik Sinner	**1**	China Open, China	Hard	F	6–7^{(6–8)}, 6–4, 7–6^{(7–3)}	3	
Loss	11–4	(Norway) Casper Ruud	7	ATP Finals, Italy	Hard (i)	RR	1–6, 5–7	3	
Win	12–4	Andrey Rublev	9	ATP Finals, Italy	Hard (i)	RR	6–3, 7–6^{(10–8)}	3	
Loss	12–5	(Germany) Alexander Zverev	2	ATP Finals, Italy	Hard (i)	RR	6–7^{(5–7)}, 4–6	3	

- Key: (Rk) first use, opponent rank; (Rd) round; (Rk) 2nd use, player rank; (Ref) reference; (F) final; (SF) semifinal; (QF) quarterfinal; (#R) rounds 4, 3, 2, 1; (RR) round-robin stage; (Q#) qualifying rounds or stages (3), 2, 1.

=== Finals ===
==== Singles: 5 (4 titles, 1 runner-up) ====
Category Grand Slam (2–0) ATP Finals (0–0) ATP Masters 1000 (1–0) Olympics (0–1) ATP 500 Series (1–0) ATP 250 Series (0–0)	Titles by surface Hard (2–0) Clay (1–1) Grass (1–0)	Titles by setting Outdoor (4–1) Indoor (0–0)

Result	W–L	Date	Tournament	Tier	Surface	Opponent	Score
Win	1–0	Mar 2024	Indian Wells Open, United States	Masters 1000	Hard	Daniil Medvedev	7–6^{(7–5)}, 6–1
Win	2–0	Jun 2024	French Open, France	Grand Slam	Clay	(Germany) Alexander Zverev	6–3, 2–6, 5–7, 6–1, 6–2
Win	3–0	Jul 2024	Wimbledon, Great Britain	Grand Slam	Grass	(Serbia) Novak Djokovic	6–2, 6–2, 7–6^{(7–4)}
Loss	3–1	Aug 2024	Summer Olympics, France	Olympics	Clay	(Serbia) Novak Djokovic	6–7^{(3–7)}, 6–7^{(2–7)}
Win	4–1	Oct 2024	China Open, China	500 Series	Hard	(Italy) Jannik Sinner	6–7^{(6–8)}, 6–4, 7–6^{(7–3)}

=== Earnings ===
- **Bold** font denotes tournament win

**Singles**
Event	Prize money	Year-to-date
Australian Open	A$600,000	$401,100
Argentina Open	$33,520	$434,620
Rio Open	$16,380	$451,000
**Indian Wells Open**	**$1,100,000**	$1,551,000
Miami Open	$185,000	$1,736,000
Madrid Open	€161,995	$1,908,622
**French Open**	**€2,400,000**	$4,517,182
Queen's Club Championships	€32,990	$4,552,478
**Wimbledon Championships**	**£2,700,000**	$7,966,628
Cincinnati Open	$49,030	$8,015,658
US Open	$140,000	$8,155,658
**China Open**	**$695,750**	$8,851,407
Shanghai Masters	$185,000	$9,036,407
Paris Masters	$80,065	$9,122,838
ATP Finals	$727,500	$9,850,338
Bonus Pool ATP Ranking: 3	$508,091	$10,358,429
		$10,358,429
**Total**
		**$10,358,429**

Figures in United States dollars (USD) unless noted.

- source：2024 Singles Activity
- source：2024 Doubles Activity

== See also ==
- 2024 ATP Tour
- 2024 Novak Djokovic tennis season
- 2024 Daniil Medvedev tennis season
- 2024 Jannik Sinner tennis season
