= Carlos Alcaraz: My Way =

2025 documentary television miniseries

- Netflix poster
- Spanish: Carlos Alcaraz: A mi manera
- Genre: Documentary
- Written by: Edu Salán; Jorge Laplace
- Directed by: Jorge Laplace
- Starring: Carlos Alcaraz
- Composer: Laro Basterrechea
- Country of origin: Spain
- Original language: Spanish
- No. of episodes: 3

Production
- Executive producers: Álex Martínez Roig; Juan Gordon
- Cinematography: Pope Maroto
- Editors: Chuchi Espinosa; Ricardo Gallego; José Garrido; César Herradura; Marcos R. Clairac; Paloma Lahuerta; Toni Frutos
- Running time: 33–44 minutes
- Production company: Morena Films

Original release
- Network: Netflix
- Release: 23 April 2025

Carlos Alcaraz: My Way (Spanish: Carlos Alcaraz: A mi manera) is a 2025 Spanish television documentary miniseries chronicling the 2024 season of Spanish professional tennis player Carlos Alcaraz. It was released on Netflix on 23 April 2025.

== Cast ==
- Carlos Alcaraz
- Juan Carlos Ferrero
- Albert Molina
- Alberto Lledó
- Juanjo López
- Juanjo Moreno
- Carlos Alcaraz González
- Virginia Garfia Escandón
- Álvaro Alcaraz Garfia
- Sergio Alcaraz Garfia
- Jaime Alcaraz Garfia
- Rafael Nadal
- Roger Federer
- Garbiñe Muguruza
- Björn Borg
- Martina Navratilova
- Jannik Sinner
- John McEnroe
- Pablo Carreño Busta
- Casper Ruud
- Andre Agassi
- Pau Gasol

== Episodes ==
| No. | Title | Duration | Original release date |
|---|---|---|---|
| 1 | "Finding Joy in the Pain" (Disfrutar sufriendo) | 44 min | 23 April 2025 |
Carlos Alcaraz's biggest fear is seeing tennis as "an obligation", and he struggles with the sacrifices he has to make for his career, foregoing time at home for tournaments and training. After winning the Indian Wells Open and completing the hardcourt season, he recovers from a forearm injury at home in El Palmar, Murcia. He withdraws from the Barcelona Open to prioritize his title defense at the Madrid Open, but ultimately loses in the quarterfinals, although his team believes his decreased form to be the result of a mental block. He spends his 21st birthday at home with his family and childhood friends, before traveling to Paris for the French Open. Alcaraz overcomes his mental block in a grueling semifinal match against Jannik Sinner, and he defeats Alexander Zverev in the final to achieve his childhood dream of winning the French Open.
| 2 | "I'm Not Rafa" (No soy Rafa) | 38 min | 23 April 2025 |
Alcaraz recounts moving to Villena as a teenager to train at the JC Ferrero Equelite Sport Academy, where he met future coach Juan Carlos Ferrero. After committing to a strict training regimen, he rose through the rankings and eventually won the 2022 US Open, becoming the youngest player to achieve a ranking of world No. 1 by the ATP and quickly rising to stardom. His team recounts the sacrifices they have made for his career, spending time away from their families to prioritize his training, although Alcaraz is determined that he can maintain his level without fully sacrificing his personal life. He successfully defends his title at Wimbledon by defeating Novak Djokovic in the final. Despite having drawn comparisons to Rafael Nadal his entire career, he is determined to forge his own path.
| 3 | "My Way" (A mi manera) | 33 min | 23 April 2025 |
Alcaraz makes his Olympic debut at the 2024 Summer Olympics, where he partners Nadal in doubles. The hype for their partnership creates immense pressure for Alcaraz, especially given that it is Nadal's final Olympics. They reach the quarterfinals, but lose to American doubles specialists Austin Krajicek and Rajeev Ram, devastating Alcaraz. He eventually reaches the singles final, but loses to Novak Djokovic. After the Olympics, Alcaraz struggles with form. He has an uncharacteristic outburst at the Cincinnati Open and is upset in the second round of the US Open by Botic van de Zandschulp. At the Laver Cup, he meets Roger Federer, who advises him to always find happiness in tennis. He goes on to defeat Jannik Sinner in the final of the China Open. Nadal retires from tennis at the Davis Cup, and Alcaraz emotionally notes the privilege of learning from his childhood idol.

== Production ==
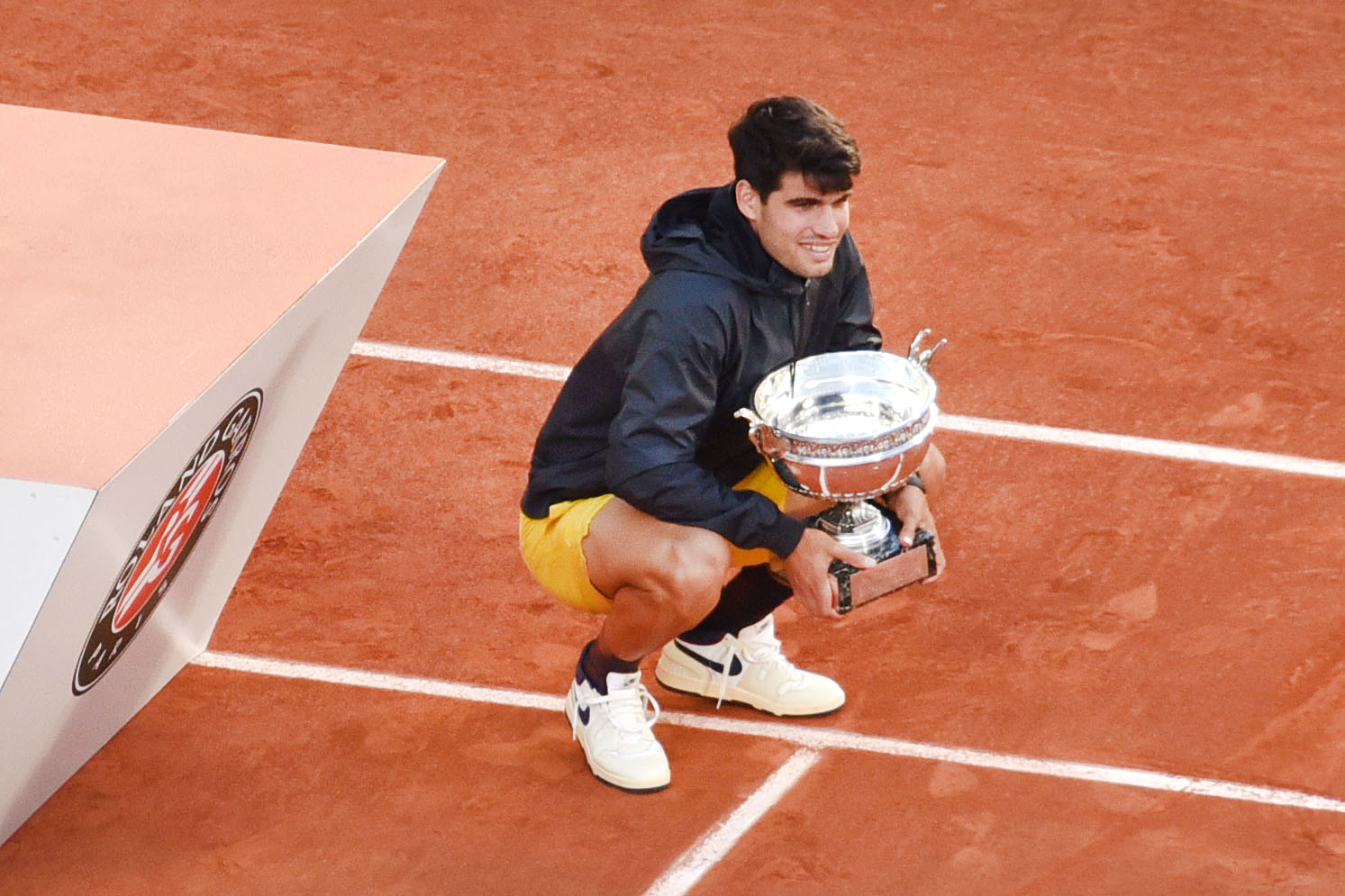
Alcaraz holding the Coupe des Mousquetaires following the men's singles final at the 2024 French Open

At the 2024 Indian Wells Open, Carlos Alcaraz alluded to a collaboration with Netflix by writing cryptic messages on a television camera lens following his match wins. On 14 March 2024, Netflix announced the production of a docuseries about Alcaraz, then titled Alcaraz, the Docuseries. Filming began at The Netflix Slam, a televised exhibition match between Alcaraz and Rafael Nadal, on 3 March 2024.

Filming continued throughout 2024 at various tournaments, including the French Open, Wimbledon, the Laver Cup, the Davis Cup, and the ATP Finals, as well as in Alcaraz's native Murcia. On 13 December 2024, director Jorge Laplace announced that filming had been completed.

== Release ==
The series was released on Netflix on 23 April 2025. Alcaraz teased the series' release date with a tattoo at the 2025 Indian Wells Open in March. An official trailer was released by Netflix on 10 April.
