= 2024 Queen's Club Championships – Doubles =

Doubles
- 2024 Queen's Club Championships

Final
- Champions: (United Kingdom) Neal Skupski (New Zealand) Michael Venus
- Runners-up: (United States) Taylor Fritz; Karen Khachanov
- Score: 4–6, 7–6^{(7–5)}, [10–8]

Events
Singles	Doubles
- Queen's Club Championships

Neal Skupski and Michael Venus defeated Taylor Fritz and Karen Khachanov in the final, 4–6, 7–6^{(7–5)}, [10–8] to win the doubles tennis title at the 2024 Queen's Club Championships.

Ivan Dodig and Austin Krajicek were the defending champions, but lost in the semifinals to Skupski and Venus.

Matthew Ebden retained the doubles no. 1 ranking by winning his opening round match. Marcel Granollers and Horacio Zeballos would otherwise have regained the top ranking, despite not competing this week.

== Seeds ==
1. (India) Rohan Bopanna / (Australia) Matthew Ebden (quarterfinals)
2. (United States) Rajeev Ram / (United Kingdom) Joe Salisbury (quarterfinals)
3. (El Salvador) Marcelo Arévalo / (Croatia) Mate Pavić (semifinals)
4. (Croatia) Ivan Dodig / (United States) Austin Krajicek (semifinals)
5. (Netherlands) Wesley Koolhof / (Croatia) Nikola Mektić (quarterfinals)
6. (Mexico) Santiago González / (France) Édouard Roger-Vasselin (quarterfinals)
7. (United Kingdom) Neal Skupski / (New Zealand) Michael Venus (champions)
8. (Austria) Alexander Erler / (Austria) Lucas Miedler (first round)

== Draw ==
Key

- Q = Qualifier
- WC = Wild card
- LL = Lucky loser
- Alt = Alternate
- ITF = ITF entry
- PR = Protected ranking
- SR = Special ranking
- SE = Special exempt
- JE = Junior exempt
- JR = Junior Accelerator Programme entrant
- CO = College Accelerator Programme entrant
- NG = Next Gen Accelerator Program entrant
- w/o = Walkover
- r = Retired
- d = Defaulted

=== Draw ===
First round
1	(India) R Bopanna (Australia) M Ebden	6	6
8/LL	(Austria) A Erler (Austria) L Miedler	4	4
(Argentina) F Cerúndolo (Argentina) TM Etcheverry	4	4
(United States) T Fritz; K Khachanov	6	6
3	(El Salvador) M Arévalo (Croatia) M Pavić	6	6
Q	(United Kingdom) J Cash (United States) R Galloway	4	4
(Argentina) S Báez (France) A Mannarino	6	3	[3]
5	(Netherlands) W Koolhof (Croatia) N Mektić	4	6	[10]
6	(Mexico) S González (France) É Roger-Vasselin	6	6
WC	(United Kingdom) J Draper (United Kingdom) C Norrie	4	4
LL	(Australia) J Peers (Australia) J Thompson	3	6^{2}
4	(Croatia) I Dodig (United States) A Krajicek	6	7^{7}
7	(United Kingdom) N Skupski (New Zealand) M Venus	6	6
(France) U Humbert (United States) B Shelton	4	3
(Australia) A de Minaur (United States) S Korda	6^{6}	5
2	(United States) R Ram (United Kingdom) J Salisbury	7^{8}	7

Quarterfinals
1	(India) R Bopanna (Australia) M Ebden	6^{1}	6^{3}
(United States) T Fritz; K Khachanov	7^{7}	7^{7}
3	(El Salvador) M Arévalo (Croatia) M Pavić	6	7
5	(Netherlands) W Koolhof (Croatia) N Mektić	4	5
6	(Mexico) S González (France) É Roger-Vasselin	7^{7}	3	[11]
4	(Croatia) I Dodig (United States) A Krajicek	6^{5}	6	[13]
7	(United Kingdom) N Skupski (New Zealand) M Venus	7^{7}	7^{8}
2	(United States) R Ram (United Kingdom) J Salisbury	6^{5}	6^{6}

Semifinals
(United States) T Fritz; K Khachanov	4	6	[12]
3	(El Salvador) M Arévalo (Croatia) M Pavić	6	3	[10]
4	(Croatia) I Dodig (United States) A Krajicek	6^{6}	4
7	(United Kingdom) N Skupski (New Zealand) M Venus	7^{8}	6

Final
(United States) T Fritz; K Khachanov	6	6^{5}	[8]
7	(United Kingdom) N Skupski (New Zealand) M Venus	4	7^{7}	[10]

== Qualifying ==
=== Seeds ===
1. (Australia) John Peers / (Australia) Jordan Thompson (first round, lucky losers)
2. (Austria) Alexander Erler / (Austria) Lucas Miedler (qualifying competition, lucky losers)

=== Qualifiers ===
1. (United Kingdom) Julian Cash / (United States) Robert Galloway

=== Lucky losers ===
1. (Austria) Alexander Erler / (Austria) Lucas Miedler
2. (Australia) John Peers / (Australia) Jordan Thompson

=== Qualifying draw ===
First round
1	(Australia) John Peers (Australia) Jordan Thompson	7^{7}	3	[11]
(United Kingdom) Julian Cash (United States) Robert Galloway	6^{4}	6	[13]
WC	(Australia) Rinky Hijikata (United Kingdom) Henry Patten	7^{7}	4	[8]
2	(Austria) Alexander Erler (Austria) Lucas Miedler	6^{4}	6	[10]

Qualifying competition
(United Kingdom) Julian Cash (United States) Robert Galloway	6	6
2	(Austria) Alexander Erler (Austria) Lucas Miedler	1	4
