= 2024 Rio Open – Doubles =

Doubles
- 2024 Rio Open

Final
- Champions: (Colombia) Nicolás Barrientos (Brazil) Rafael Matos
- Runners-up: (Austria) Alexander Erler (Austria) Lucas Miedler
- Score: 6–4, 6–3

Details
- Draw: 16
- Seeds: 4

Events
Singles	Doubles
← 2023 ·	Rio Open	· 2025 →

Nicolás Barrientos and Rafael Matos defeated Alexander Erler and Lucas Miedler in the final, 6–4, 6–3 to win the doubles tennis title at the 2024 Rio Open.

Máximo González were Andrés Molteni were the defending champions, but lost in the quarterfinals to Erler and Miedler.

== Seeds ==
1. (United States) Rajeev Ram / (United Kingdom) Joe Salisbury (first round)
2. (Spain) Marcel Granollers / (Argentina) Horacio Zeballos (first round)
3. (Argentina) Máximo González / (Argentina) Andrés Molteni (quarterfinals)
4. (Germany) Kevin Krawietz / (Germany) Tim Pütz (quarterfinals)

== Draw ==
=== Key ===
- Q = Qualifier
- WC = Wild card
- LL = Lucky loser
- Alt = Alternate
- ITF = ITF entry
- PR = Protected ranking
- SR = Special ranking
- SE = Special exempt
- JE = Junior exempt
- JR = Junior Accelerator Programme entrant
- CO = College Accelerator Programme entrant
- NG = Next Gen Accelerator Program entrant
- w/o = Walkover
- r = Retired
- d = Defaulted

=== Draw ===
First round
1	(United States) R Ram (United Kingdom) J Salisbury	7^{7}	4	[8]
(United Kingdom) J Cash (United States) R Galloway	6^{4}	6	[10]
(France) S Doumbia (France) F Reboul	6	6
WC	(Brazil) M Demoliner (Brazil) F Meligeni Alves	4	1
3	(Argentina) M González (Argentina) A Molteni	6	7
WC	(Brazil) F Romboli (Brazil) T Seyboth Wild	3	5
(Austria) S Ofner (Spain) B Zapata Miralles	4	3
(Austria) A Erler (Austria) L Miedler	6	6
(Brazil) M Melo (Netherlands) M Middelkoop	6	4	[6]
(Colombia) N Barrientos (Brazil) R Matos	3	6	[10]
Q	(Brazil) J Fonseca (Brazil) M Zormann	6^{6}	5
4	(Germany) K Krawietz (Germany) T Pütz	7^{7}	7
(Portugal) F Cabral (United Kingdom) H Patten	6^{4}	6	[6]
(Spain) R Carballés Baena (Serbia) D Lajović	7^{7}	2	[10]
(Italy) S Bolelli (Italy) A Vavassori	6	3	[10]
2	(Spain) M Granollers (Argentina) H Zeballos	4	6	[7]

Quarterfinals
(United Kingdom) J Cash (United States) R Galloway	4	6	[5]
(France) S Doumbia (France) F Reboul	6	3	[10]
3	(Argentina) M González (Argentina) A Molteni	3	6	[15]
(Austria) A Erler (Austria) L Miedler	6	3	[17]
(Colombia) N Barrientos (Brazil) R Matos	3	7^{7}	[10]
4	(Germany) K Krawietz (Germany) T Pütz	6	6^{5}	[8]
(Spain) R Carballés Baena (Serbia) D Lajović	2	3
(Italy) S Bolelli (Italy) A Vavassori	6	6

Semifinals
(France) S Doumbia (France) F Reboul	6^{3}	6^{2}
(Austria) A Erler (Austria) L Miedler	7^{7}	7^{7}
(Colombia) N Barrientos (Brazil) R Matos	2	6	[10]
(Italy) S Bolelli (Italy) A Vavassori	6	3	[6]

Final
(Austria) A Erler (Austria) L Miedler	4	3
(Colombia) N Barrientos (Brazil) R Matos	6	6

== Qualifying ==
=== Seeds ===
1. (Romania) Victor Vlad Cornea / (Austria) Philipp Oswald (first round)
2. (France) Théo Arribagé / (France) Luca Sanchez (first round)

=== Qualifiers ===
1. (Brazil) João Fonseca / (Brazil) Marcelo Zormann

=== Qualifying draw ===
First round
1	(Romania) Victor Vlad Cornea (Austria) Philipp Oswald	3	1
(Germany) Yannick Hanfmann (Peru) Juan Pablo Varillas	6	6
WC	(Brazil) João Fonseca (Brazil) Marcelo Zormann	6	6
2	(France) Théo Arribagé (France) Luca Sanchez	4	4

Qualifying competition
(Germany) Yannick Hanfmann (Peru) Juan Pablo Varillas	3	6	[1]
WC	(Brazil) João Fonseca (Brazil) Marcelo Zormann	6	4	[10]
