= 2024 China Open – Women's doubles =

Women's doubles
- 2024 China Open

Final
- Champions: (Italy) Sara Errani (Italy) Jasmine Paolini
- Runners-up: (Chinese Taipei) Chan Hao-ching; Veronika Kudermetova
- Score: 6–4, 6–4

Details
- Draw: 32
- Seeds: 8

Events
Singles	men	women
Doubles	men	women
- China Open

Sara Errani and Jasmine Paolini defeated Chan Hao-ching and Veronika Kudermetova in the final, 6–4, 6–4 to win the women's doubles tennis title at the 2024 China Open. It was the seventh WTA 1000 doubles title for Errani and second for Paolini.

Marie Bouzková and Sara Sorribes Tormo were the defending champions, but Bouzková withdrew before the start of the tournament and Sorribes Tormo decided not to participate.

== Seeds ==
1. (Canada) Gabriela Dabrowski / (New Zealand) Erin Routliffe (second round)
2. (Czech Republic) Kateřina Siniaková / (United States) Taylor Townsend (first round)
3. (United States) Caroline Dolehide / (United States) Desirae Krawczyk (first round)
4. (United States) Nicole Melichar-Martinez / (Australia) Ellen Perez (first round)
5. (Italy) Sara Errani / (Italy) Jasmine Paolini (champions)
6. (Belgium) Elise Mertens / (China) Zhang Shuai (first round)
7. (Chinese Taipei) Chan Hao-ching / Veronika Kudermetova (final)
8. (Netherlands) Demi Schuurs / (Brazil) Luisa Stefani (first round)

== Draw ==
Key

- Q = Qualifier
- WC = Wild card
- LL = Lucky loser
- Alt = Alternate
- ITF = ITF entry
- PR = Protected ranking
- SR = Special ranking
- SE = Special exempt
- JE = Junior exempt
- JR = Junior Accelerator Programme entrant
- CO = College Accelerator Programme entrant
- NG = Next Gen Accelerator Program entrant
- w/o = Walkover
- r = Retired
- d = Defaulted

=== Finals ===
Semifinals
7	(Chinese Taipei) Chan Hao-ching; Veronika Kudermetova	6	6
(Italy) Elisabetta Cocciaretto; Liudmila Samsonova	3	4
5	(Italy) Sara Errani (Italy) Jasmine Paolini	6	1	[10]
(United States) Sofia Kenin (United States) Bethanie Mattek-Sands	3	6	[4]

Final
7	(Chinese Taipei) Chan Hao-ching; Veronika Kudermetova	4	4
5	(Italy) Sara Errani (Italy) Jasmine Paolini	6	6

=== Top half ===
First round
1	(Canada) G Dabrowski (New Zealand) E Routliffe	7	6
(Chinese Taipei) S-w Hsieh (China) Xin Wang	5	2
(United States) A Muhammad (United States) J Pegula	2	5
(Slovakia) T Mihalíková (United Kingdom) O Nicholls	6	7
(Spain) P Badosa (Czech Republic) K Muchová	6	6
(Kazakhstan) A Danilina; I Khromacheva	3	2
(Norway) U Eikeri (Chinese Taipei) F-h Wu	4	3
7	(Chinese Taipei) H-c Chan; V Kudermetova	6	6
4	(United States) N Melichar-Martinez (Australia) E Perez	4	3
WC	(China) Xiy Wang (China) Y Wang	6	6
(Italy) E Cocciaretto; L Samsonova	6	0	[12]
A Potapova (Kazakhstan) Y Putintseva	4	6	[10]
WC	(China) Q Tang (China) Y Yuan	6	7^{7}
(United Kingdom) H Dart (United States) A Krueger	4	6^{0}
(Mexico) G Olmos; A Panova	4	6	[10]
8	(Netherlands) D Schuurs (Brazil) L Stefani	6	4	[8]

Second round
1	(Canada) G Dabrowski (New Zealand) E Routliffe	6^{5}	6	[9]
(Slovakia) T Mihalíková (United Kingdom) O Nicholls	7^{7}	3	[11]
(Spain) P Badosa (Czech Republic) K Muchová
7	(Chinese Taipei) H-c Chan; V Kudermetova	w/o
WC	(China) Xiy Wang (China) Y Wang	6	3	[8]
(Italy) E Cocciaretto; L Samsonova	3	6	[10]
WC	(China) Q Tang (China) Y Yuan	6	6
(Mexico) G Olmos; A Panova	4	4

Quarterfinals
(Slovakia) T Mihalíková (United Kingdom) O Nicholls	6^{5}	3
7	(Chinese Taipei) H-c Chan; V Kudermetova	7^{7}	6
(Italy) E Cocciaretto; L Samsonova	7^{9}	6
WC	(China) Q Tang (China) Y Yuan	6^{7}	3

Semifinals
7	(Chinese Taipei) H-c Chan; V Kudermetova	6	6
(Italy) E Cocciaretto; L Samsonova	3	4

=== Bottom half ===
First round
5	(Italy) S Errani (Italy) J Paolini	6	7
(Spain) C Bucșa (Romania) M Niculescu	2	5
(China) H Guo (China) X Jiang	2	6^{7}
(Canada) L Fernandez (Indonesia) A Sutjiadi	6	7^{9}
(Hungary) T Babos; Y Sizikova	6	7^{7}
Alt	(New Zealand) L Sun (Japan) M Uchijima	1	6^{2}
(Brazil) B Haddad Maia (Germany) L Siegemund	6	6
3	(United States) C Dolehide (United States) D Krawczyk	4	3
6	(Belgium) E Mertens (China) S Zhang	3	3
(Japan) M Kato (Ukraine) N Kichenok	6	6
(Japan) M Ninomiya (China) Y Xu	4	1
(United States) S Kenin (United States) B Mattek-Sands	6	6
M Andreeva; D Shnaider	6	6
(Japan) S Aoyama (Japan) E Hozumi	0	2
(Ukraine) L Kichenok (Ukraine) M Kostyuk	2	7^{9}	[11]
2	(Czech Republic) K Siniaková (United States) T Townsend	6	6^{7}	[9]

Second round
5	(Italy) S Errani (Italy) J Paolini	7^{7}	6
(Canada) L Fernandez (Indonesia) A Sutjiadi	6^{4}	2
(Hungary) T Babos; Y Sizikova	4	2
(Brazil) B Haddad Maia (Germany) L Siegemund	6	6
(Japan) M Kato (Ukraine) N Kichenok	0	4
(United States) S Kenin (United States) B Mattek-Sands	6	6
M Andreeva; D Shnaider	6	6
(Ukraine) L Kichenok (Ukraine) M Kostyuk	1	0

Quarterfinals
5	(Italy) S Errani (Italy) J Paolini	7	4	[10]
(Brazil) B Haddad Maia (Germany) L Siegemund	5	6	[8]
(United States) S Kenin (United States) B Mattek-Sands	6	6
M Andreeva; D Shnaider	1	2

Semifinals
5	(Italy) S Errani (Italy) J Paolini	6	1	[10]
(United States) S Kenin (United States) B Mattek-Sands	3	6	[4]
