= 2024 China Open – Women's singles =

Women's singles
- 2024 China Open

Final
- Champion: (United States) Coco Gauff
- Runner-up: (Czech Republic) Karolína Muchová
- Score: 6–1, 6–3

Details
- Draw: 96
- Seeds: 32

Events
Singles	men	women
Doubles	men	women
← 2023 ·	China Open	· 2025 →

Coco Gauff defeated Karolína Muchová in the final, 6–1, 6–3 to win the women's singles tennis title at the 2024 China Open. It was her second WTA 1000 title and eighth career singles title. Gauff became the second American woman to win the China Open, after Serena Williams, and the youngest women's singles champion at the tournament since Caroline Wozniacki in 2010. Ranked as the world No. 49, Muchová was the lowest ranked woman to reach the final since the tournament's inception in 2004.

Iga Świątek was the reigning champion, but withdrew before the start of the tournament.

The first round match between Sara Sorribes Tormo and Gao Xinyu lasted for 4 hours and 15 minutes, becoming the fourth-longest match on the WTA Tour in the Open Era, surpassing the Thailand Open second round match between Laura Siegemund and Wang Xiyu from the previous week.

With her win over McCartney Kessler in the first round, Zhang Shuai claimed her first tour-level win since the 2023 Lyon Open, ending her streak of 24 consecutive losses. Zhang's streak marked the second-longest consecutive losing streak for a woman in the Open Era (after Madeleine Pegel with 29). Zhang's second round win against Emma Navarro also saw her become the lowest ranked player (at No. 595) to defeat a top 10 player since the inception of the tournament in 2004.

== Seeds ==
All seeds received a bye into the second round.

1. Aryna Sabalenka (quarterfinals)
2. (United States) Jessica Pegula (fourth round)
3. (Italy) Jasmine Paolini (third round)
4. (United States) Coco Gauff (champion)
5. (China) Zheng Qinwen (semifinals)
6. (United States) Emma Navarro (second round)
7. (Czech Republic) Barbora Krejčíková (second round)
8. (Latvia) Jeļena Ostapenko (withdrew)
9. Daria Kasatkina (third round)
10. Anna Kalinskaya (fourth round)
11. Liudmila Samsonova (second round)
12. Diana Shnaider (third round)
13. (Brazil) Beatriz Haddad Maia (third round)
14. (Ukraine) Marta Kostyuk (second round)
15. (Spain) Paula Badosa (semifinals)
16. (Croatia) Donna Vekić (third round)
17. Mirra Andreeva (quarterfinals)
18. (United States) Madison Keys (fourth round)
19. Anastasia Pavlyuchenkova (withdrew)
20. (Canada) Leylah Fernandez (second round)
21. (Kazakhstan) Yulia Putintseva (second round)
22. Ekaterina Alexandrova (second round)
23. (Poland) Magdalena Fręch (fourth round)
24. (Belgium) Elise Mertens (third round)
25. (Ukraine) Dayana Yastremska (second round)
26. (United Kingdom) Katie Boulter (third round)
27. (Czech Republic) Kateřina Siniaková (second round)
28. Anastasia Potapova (second round)
29. (New Zealand) Lulu Sun (second round)
30. (China) Yuan Yue (second round)
31. (Poland) Magda Linette (fourth round)
32. Veronika Kudermetova (third round)
33. (United States) Caroline Dolehide (second round)
34. (United States) Amanda Anisimova (fourth round)

Click on the seed number of a player to go to their draw section.

== Draw ==
=== Key ===
- Q = Qualifier
- WC = Wild card
- LL = Lucky loser
- Alt = Alternate
- ITF = ITF entry
- PR = Protected ranking
- SR = Special ranking
- SE = Special exempt
- JE = Junior exempt
- JR = Junior Accelerator Programme entrant
- CO = College Accelerator Programme entrant
- NG = Next Gen Accelerator Program entrant
- w/o = Walkover
- r = Retired
- d = Defaulted

=== Finals ===
Quarterfinals
1	Aryna Sabalenka	6^{5}	6	4
(Czech Republic) Karolína Muchová	7^{7}	2	6
17	Mirra Andreeva	7	0	4
5	(China) Zheng Qinwen	5	6	6
Q	(Ukraine) Yuliia Starodubtseva	6	2	2
4	(United States) Coco Gauff	2	6	6
WC	(China) Zhang Shuai	1	6^{4}
15	(Spain) Paula Badosa	6	7^{7}

Semifinals
(Czech Republic) Karolína Muchová	6	6
5	(China) Zheng Qinwen	3	4
4	(United States) Coco Gauff	4	6	6
15	(Spain) Paula Badosa	6	4	2

Final
(Czech Republic) Karolína Muchová	1	3
4	(United States) Coco Gauff	6	6

=== Top half ===
==== Section 1 ====
First round
Q	(Kazakhstan) Z Diyas	2	3
Q	(Thailand) M Sawangkaew	6	6
(China) Y Wang	6	4	2
(United States) A Krueger	3	6	6
WC	(China) X Gao	7^{7}	5	5
Q	(Spain) S Sorribes Tormo	6^{4}	7	7
Q	(Romania) E-G Ruse	4	6^{6}
WC	(China) S Wei	6	7^{8}

Second round
1	A Sabalenka	6	6
Q	(Thailand) M Sawangkaew	4	1
(United States) A Krueger	6	7^{7}
29	(New Zealand) L Sun	1	6^{4}
18	(United States) M Keys	6	6
Q	(Spain) S Sorribes Tormo	2	1
WC	(China) S Wei	5	4
13	(Brazil) B Haddad Maia	7	6

Third round
1	A Sabalenka	6	6
(United States) A Krueger	2	2
18	(United States) M Keys	6	6
13	(Brazil) B Haddad Maia	3	3

Fourth round
1	A Sabalenka	6	6
18	(United States) M Keys	4	3

==== Section 2 ====
First round
WC	(China) X Yao	3	2
(Spain) C Bucșa	6	6
Q	(Australia) Ar Rodionova	6	4	3
(Italy) E Cocciaretto	4	6	6
A Blinkova	1	1
(Czech Republic) K Muchová	6	6
(Hungary) A Bondár	1	6^{5}
(Romania) J Cristian	6	7^{7}

Second round
11	L Samsonova	1	6	4
(Spain) C Bucșa	6	4	6
(Italy) E Cocciaretto	4	7^{8}	3
24	(Belgium) E Mertens	6	6^{6}	6
30	(China) Y Yuan	3	1
(Czech Republic) K Muchová	6	6
(Romania) J Cristian	1	6	7
7	(Czech Republic) B Krejčíková	6	4	5

Third round
(Spain) C Bucșa	4	6	6
24	(Belgium) E Mertens	6	2	2
(Czech Republic) K Muchová	6	6
(Romania) J Cristian	1	3

Fourth round
(Spain) C Bucșa	2	0
(Czech Republic) K Muchová	6	6

==== Section 3 ====
First round
(United Kingdom) H Dart	7	4	1
(Denmark) C Tauson	5	6	6
(Japan) M Uchijima	6	6
WC	(China) H Shi	3	4
WC	(China) Y Ma	6	4	1
PR	(Romania) I-C Begu	1	6	6
(Switzerland) V Golubic	7^{7}	0	6
(China) Xiy Wang	6^{5}	6	3

Second round
3	(Italy) J Paolini	1	7	6
(Denmark) C Tauson	6	5	4
(Japan) M Uchijima	4	6	3
31	(Poland) M Linette	6	4	6
17	M Andreeva	6^{5}	6	6
PR	(Romania) I-C Begu	7^{7}	1	1
(Switzerland) V Golubic	6	6^{3}	4
16	(Croatia) D Vekić	4	7^{7}	6

Third round
3	(Italy) J Paolini	4	0
31	(Poland) M Linette	6	6
17	M Andreeva	3	6	6
16	(Croatia) D Vekić	6	4	4

Fourth round
31	(Poland) M Linette	1	3
17	M Andreeva	6	6

==== Section 4 ====
First round
WC	(China) M Wang	3	4
LL	(Croatia) J Fett	6	6
(Colombia) C Osorio	1	6	6
PR	(Australia) A Tomljanović	6	3	3
WC	(China) Y Ren	4	2
(Argentina) N Podoroska	6	6
Q	(Australia) K Birrell	2	4
LL	K Rakhimova	6	6

Second round
9	D Kasatkina	6	6
LL	(Croatia) J Fett	1	2
(Colombia) C Osorio	6	3	4
34	(United States) A Anisimova	1	6	6
25	(Ukraine) D Yastremska	5	7^{7}	2
(Argentina) N Podoroska	7	6^{4}	6
LL	K Rakhimova	1	1
5	(China) Q Zheng	6	6

Third round
9	D Kasatkina	6^{1}	4
34	(United States) A Anisimova	7^{7}	6
(Argentina) N Podoroska	3	2
5	(China) Q Zheng	6	6

Fourth round
34	(United States) A Anisimova	6	1	2
5	(China) Q Zheng	3	6	6

=== Bottom half ===
==== Section 5 ====
First round
(Armenia) E Avanesyan	6	7
LL	(United States) E Bektas	2	5
Q	(Ukraine) Y Starodubtseva	6	7^{7}
(Germany) L Siegemund	4	6^{3}
(Spain) J Bouzas Maneiro	2	4
(United States) P Stearns	6	6
(France) V Gracheva	0	3
Q	(United States) H Baptiste	6	6

Second round
33	(United States) C Dolehide	3	7	2
(Armenia) E Avanesyan	6	5	6
Q	(Ukraine) Y Starodubtseva	6	6
27	(Czech Republic) K Siniaková	2	2
20	(Canada) L Fernandez	5	2
(United States) P Stearns	7	6
Q	(United States) H Baptiste	6	6^{2}	6^{5}
10	A Kalinskaya	3	7^{7}	7^{7}

Third round
(Armenia) E Avanesyan	3	1
Q	(Ukraine) Y Starodubtseva	6	6
(United States) P Stearns	6	3	1^{r}
10	A Kalinskaya	3	6	3

Fourth round
Q	(Ukraine) Y Starodubtseva	7	6
10	A Kalinskaya	5	0

==== Section 6 ====
First round
(United States) K Volynets	7	6
Q	(Hungary) D Gálfi	5	1
(Italy) L Bronzetti	3	2
(Japan) N Osaka	6	6
(Italy) M Trevisan	2	6	3
(United States) T Townsend	6	4	6
(France) C Burel	6	5	6
LL	(Germany) T Korpatsch	3	7	3

Second round
14	(Ukraine) M Kostyuk	5	3
(United States) K Volynets	7	6
(Japan) N Osaka	3	6	6
21	(Kazakhstan) Y Putintseva	6	4	2
26	(United Kingdom) K Boulter	6	6
(United States) T Townsend	4	4
(France) C Burel	5	3
4	(United States) C Gauff	7	6

Third round
(United States) K Volynets	3	2
(Japan) N Osaka	6	6
26	(United Kingdom) K Boulter	5	2
4	(United States) C Gauff	7	6

Fourth round
(Japan) N Osaka	6	4	0^{r}
4	(United States) C Gauff	3	6	0

==== Section 7 ====
First round
WC	(China) S Zhang	7^{7}	7^{7}
(United States) M Kessler	6^{5}	6^{1}
(Belgium) G Minnen	7	6
E Andreeva	5	2
PR	(China) Q Wang	6	4	2
Q	(United States) A Parks	1	6	6
(United States) S Kenin	7	6
(Romania) A Bogdan	5	2

Second round
6	(United States) E Navarro	4	2
WC	(China) S Zhang	6	6
(Belgium) G Minnen	7	2	6
28	A Potapova	5	6	4
23	(Poland) M Fręch	6	5	6
Q	(United States) A Parks	4	7	4
(United States) S Kenin	2	3
12	D Shnaider	6	6

Third round
WC	(China) S Zhang	6	6
(Belgium) G Minnen	2	3
23	(Poland) M Fręch	0	6	6
12	D Shnaider	6	3	4

Fourth round
WC	(China) S Zhang	6	6
23	(Poland) M Fręch	4	2

==== Section 8 ====
First round
(Ukraine) L Tsurenko	3	3
(Bulgaria) V Tomova	6	6
(Ukraine) A Kalinina	4	0
Q	(Slovakia) R Šramková	6	6
LL	(Japan) M Hontama	1	3
(China) Xin Wang	6	6
(France) D Parry	4	6	6
Q	(Chinese Taipei) E-s Liang	6	0	0

Second round
15	(Spain) P Badosa	6	6
(Bulgaria) V Tomova	3	2
Q	(Slovakia) R Šramková	5	6	6
22	E Alexandrova	7	4	3
32	V Kudermetova	3	6	7
(China) Xin Wang	6	4	5
(France) D Parry	1	6^{4}
2	(United States) J Pegula	6	7^{7}

Third round
15	(Spain) P Badosa	7	7
Q	(Slovakia) R Šramková	5	5
32	V Kudermetova	7^{11}	1	2
2	(United States) J Pegula	6^{9}	6	6

Fourth round
15	(Spain) P Badosa	6	6
2	(United States) J Pegula	4	0

== Seeded players ==
The following are the seeded players based on WTA rankings as of 16 September 2024. Rankings and points before are as of 23 September 2024.

Under the 2024 WTA Rulebook, points from six of the seven combined/virtually combined ATP/WTA 1000 tournaments (which include Beijing) are required to be counted in a player's ranking. Because the tournament is being expanded to two weeks this year, players are also defending points from the tournaments that took place during the week of 25 September 2023 (Tokyo and Ningbo).

The points dropping column reflects (a) points from the 2023 tournament and/or Tokyo / Ningbo, (b) the player's sixth best combined ATP/WTA 1000 tournament or (c) the player's 18th best result. The points won column reflects the points from the 2024 tournament.

Seed	Rank	Player	Points before	Points dropping	Points won	Points after	Status
1	2	Aryna Sabalenka	8,716	215	215	8,716	Quarterfinals lost to (Czech Republic) Karolína Muchová
2	3	(United States) Jessica Pegula	6,220	120+305	120+30	5,945	Fourth round lost to (Spain) Paula Badosa [15]
3	5	(Italy) Jasmine Paolini	5,348	120	65	5,293	Third round lost to (Poland) Magda Linette [31]
4	6	(United States) Coco Gauff	4,983	390	1,000	5,593	Champion, defeated (Czech Republic) Karolína Muchová
5	7	(China) Zheng Qinwen	3,920	(60)^{§}	390	4,250	Semifinals lost to (Czech Republic) Karolína Muchová
6	8	(United States) Emma Navarro	3,698	(10)^{†}	10	3,698	Second round lost to (China) Zhang Shuai [WC]
7	10	(Czech Republic) Barbora Krejčíková	3,161	10	10	3,161	Second round lost to (Romania) Jaqueline Cristian
8	13	(Latvia) Jeļena Ostapenko	2,963	215	0	2,748	Withdrew due to an abdominal injury
9	11	Daria Kasatkina	3,020	(10)^{†}	65	3,075	Third round lost to (United States) Amanda Anisimova [34]
10	14	Anna Kalinskaya	2,725	20	120	2,825	Fourth round lost to (Ukraine) Yuliia Starodubtseva [Q]
11	15	Liudmila Samsonova	2,720	650+55	10+55	2,080	Second round lost to (Spain) Cristina Bucșa
12	16	Diana Shnaider	2,685	(10)^{†}+180	65+81	2,641	Third round lost to (Poland) Magdalena Fręch [23]
13	12	(Brazil) Beatriz Haddad Maia	2,981	10	65	3,036	Third round lost to (United States) Madison Keys [18]
14	18	(Ukraine) Marta Kostyuk	2,493	120	10	2,383	Second round lost to (United States) Katie Volynets
15	19	(Spain) Paula Badosa	2,325	(1)^{‡}	390	2,714	Semifinals lost to (United States) Coco Gauff [4]
16	20	(Croatia) Donna Vekić	2,243	10	65	2,298	Third round lost to Mirra Andreeva [17]
17	22	Mirra Andreeva	2,153	150	215	2,218	Quarterfinals lost to (China) Zheng Qinwen [5]
18	24	(United States) Madison Keys	2,076	0	120	2,196	Fourth round lost to Aryna Sabalenka [1]
19	25	Anastasia Pavlyuchenkova	2,021	10+185	0+30	1,856	Withdrew due to a lower back injury
20	28	(Canada) Leylah Fernandez	1,834	(10)^{†}	10	1,834	Second round lost to (United States) Peyton Stearns
21	32	(Kazakhstan) Yulia Putintseva	1,733	95+30	10+1	1,619	Second round lost to (Japan) Naomi Osaka
22	33	Ekaterina Alexandrova	1,733	10+100	10+60	1,693	Second round lost to (Slovakia) Rebecca Šramková [Q]
23	31	(Poland) Magdalena Fręch	1,743	(10)^{†}	120	1,853	Fourth round lost to (China) Zhang Shuai [WC]
24	29	(Belgium) Elise Mertens	1,749	10	65	1,804	Third round lost to (Spain) Cristina Bucșa
25	35	(Ukraine) Dayana Yastremska	1,603	(1)^{‡}	10	1,612	Second round lost to (Argentina) Nadia Podoroska
26	34	(United Kingdom) Katie Boulter	1,655	95	65	1,625	Third round lost to (United States) Coco Gauff [4]
27	37	(Czech Republic) Kateřina Siniaková	1,474	(10)^{†}	10	1,474	Second round lost to (Ukraine) Yuliia Starodubtseva [Q]
28	38	Anastasia Potapova	1,427	10	10	1,427	Second round lost to (Belgium) Greet Minnen
29	40	(New Zealand) Lulu Sun	1,375	(6)^{‡}	10	1,379	Second round lost to (United States) Ashlyn Krueger
30	41	(China) Yuan Yue	1,349	65	10	1,294	Second round lost to (Czech Republic) Karolína Muchová
31	45	(Poland) Magda Linette	1,311	120	120	1,311	Fourth round lost to Mirra Andreeva [17]
32	39	Veronika Kudermetova	1,398	120+470	65+60	933	Third round lost to (United States) Jessica Pegula [2]
33	98	(United States) Caroline Dolehide	703	(1)^{‡}	10	712	Second round lost to (Armenia) Elina Avanesyan
34	43	(United States) Amanda Anisimova	1,276	0	120	1,396	Fourth round lost to (China) Zheng Qinwen [5]

† The player is defending points from her sixth best combined ATP/WTA 1000 tournament.
‡ The player did not qualify for the main draw in 2023. She is defending points from her 18th best result instead.
§ The player's 2023 points were replaced by a better result for purposes of her ranking as of 23 September 2024. Points from her 18th best result will be deducted instead.

=== Withdrawn seeded players ===
The following players would have been seeded, but withdrew before the tournament began.

Rank	Player	Points before	Points dropping	Points added	Points after	Withdrawal reason
1	(Poland) Iga Świątek	10,885	1,000+100	0	9,785	Personal reasons
4	(Kazakhstan) Elena Rybakina	5,871	390	0	5,481	Back injury
9	(United States) Danielle Collins	3,178	1	0	3,177	Illness
17	(Greece) Maria Sakkari	2,517	215+185	0+1	2,118	Shoulder injury
21	(Tunisia) Ons Jabeur	2,160	65+280	0+10	1,825	Shoulder injury
23	Victoria Azarenka	2,137	10	0	2,127	
26	(Czech Republic) Linda Nosková	1,953	65	0	1,888	Personal reasons
27	(Ukraine) Elina Svitolina	1,942	0	0	1,942	Foot surgery
30	(Czech Republic) Markéta Vondroušová	1,748	10	0	1,738	Shoulder injury
36	(France) Caroline Garcia	1,563	215+100	0+10	1,258	Shoulder injury
42	(Czech Republic) Marie Bouzková	1,330	0	0	1,330	
44	(Czech Republic) Karolína Plíšková	1,265	0	0	1,265	Ankle surgery

== Other entry information ==
=== Wildcards ===
- (China) Gao Xinyu
- (China) Ma Yexin
- (China) Ren Yufei
- (China) Shi Han
- (China) Wang Meiling
- (China) Wei Sijia
- (China) Yao Xinxin
- (China) Zhang Shuai

=== Protected ranking ===
- (Romania) Irina-Camelia Begu
- (Australia) Ajla Tomljanović
- (China) Wang Qiang

=== Withdrawals ===
- ‡ Victoria Azarenka → replaced by (Hungary) Anna Bondár
- ‡ (Czech Republic) Marie Bouzková → replaced by (United States) Bernarda Pera
- † (Romania) Sorana Cîrstea → replaced by (Italy) Lucia Bronzetti
- ‡ (United States) Danielle Collins → replaced by (Romania) Ana Bogdan
- ‡ (France) Caroline Garcia → replaced by (Ukraine) Lesia Tsurenko
- ‡ (Tunisia) Ons Jabeur → replaced by (Italy) Martina Trevisan
- ‡ (Czech Republic) Linda Nosková → replaced by (United Kingdom) Harriet Dart
- § (Latvia) Jeļena Ostapenko → replaced by (Germany) Tamara Korpatsch (LL)
- § Anastasia Pavlyuchenkova → replaced by (Japan) Mai Hontama (LL)
- § (United States) Bernarda Pera → replaced by Kamilla Rakhimova (LL)
- ‡ (Czech Republic) Karolína Plíšková → replaced by (Colombia) Camila Osorio
- § (United Kingdom) Emma Raducanu → replaced by (Croatia) Jana Fett (LL)
- ‡ (Kazakhstan) Elena Rybakina → replaced by (Japan) Naomi Osaka
- ‡ (Greece) Maria Sakkari → replaced by (Germany) Laura Siegemund
- § (United States) Sloane Stephens → replaced by (United States) Emina Bektas (LL)
- ‡ (Ukraine) Elina Svitolina → replaced by Anna Blinkova
- ‡ (Poland) Iga Świątek → replaced by (China) Wang Qiang
- † (Czech Republic) Markéta Vondroušová → replaced by Erika Andreeva
- ‡ (Denmark) Caroline Wozniacki → replaced by (China) Wang Yafan
- † (China) Zhu Lin → replaced by (Spain) Cristina Bucșa

† – not included on entry list
‡ – withdrew from entry list
§ – withdrew from main draw

== Qualifying ==
=== Seeds ===
1. Kamilla Rakhimova (qualifying competition, lucky loser)
2. (Germany) Tatjana Maria (first round)
3. (Italy) Sara Errani (first round)
4. (Romania) Elena-Gabriela Ruse (qualified)
5. (Slovakia) Rebecca Šramková (qualified)
6. (United States) Hailey Baptiste (qualified)
7. (Spain) Sara Sorribes Tormo (qualified)
8. (Australia) Arina Rodionova (qualified)
9. (United States) Alycia Parks (qualified)
10. (Ukraine) Yuliia Starodubtseva (qualified)
11. (Spain) Rebeka Masarova (first round)
12. (United States) Emina Bektas (qualifying competition, lucky loser)
13. (Germany) Tamara Korpatsch (qualifying competition, lucky loser)
14. (Canada) Marina Stakusic (first round)
15. (Croatia) Jana Fett (qualifying competition, lucky loser)
16. (Japan) Mai Hontama (qualifying competition, lucky loser)
17. (Czech Republic) Linda Fruhvirtová (first round)
18. (Netherlands) Suzan Lamens (first round)
19. (Hungary) Dalma Gálfi (qualified)
20. (France) Elsa Jacquemot (first round)
21. (Japan) Nao Hibino (first round)
22. (Australia) Kimberly Birrell (qualified)
23. (Turkey) Zeynep Sönmez (qualifying competition)
24. (United States) Sachia Vickery (first round)

=== Qualifiers ===
1. (Australia) Kimberly Birrell
2. (Hungary) Dalma Gálfi
3. (Chinese Taipei) Liang En-shuo
4. (Romania) Elena-Gabriela Ruse
5. (Slovakia) Rebecca Šramková
6. (United States) Hailey Baptiste
7. (Spain) Sara Sorribes Tormo
8. (Australia) Arina Rodionova
9. (United States) Alycia Parks
10. (Ukraine) Yuliia Starodubtseva
11. (Kazakhstan) Zarina Diyas
12. (Thailand) Mananchaya Sawangkaew

=== Lucky losers ===
1. Kamilla Rakhimova
2. (United States) Emina Bektas
3. (Croatia) Jana Fett
4. (Japan) Mai Hontama
5. (Germany) Tamara Korpatsch

=== Qualifying draw ===
==== First qualifier ====
First round
1	Kamilla Rakhimova	6	6
WC	(China) Qu Yihan	4	3
(Serbia) Natalija Stevanović	0	1
22	(Australia) Kimberly Birrell	6	6

Qualifying competition
1	Kamilla Rakhimova	6	2	6^{2}
22	(Australia) Kimberly Birrell	4	6	7^{7}

==== Second qualifier ====
First round
2	(Germany) Tatjana Maria	0	6^{3}
Aliona Falei	6	7^{7}
(United States) Hanna Chang	1	3
19	(Hungary) Dalma Gálfi	6	6

Qualifying competition
Aliona Falei	1	4
19	(Hungary) Dalma Gálfi	6	6

==== Third qualifier ====
First round
3	(Italy) Sara Errani	1	3
(Chinese Taipei) Liang En-shuo	6	6
WC	(China) Shao Yushan	0	1
15	(Croatia) Jana Fett	6	6

Qualifying competition
(Chinese Taipei) Liang En-shuo	6	7^{11}
15	(Croatia) Jana Fett	1	6^{9}

==== Fourth qualifier ====
First round
4	(Romania) Elena-Gabriela Ruse	6	4	6
WC	(China) Feng Shuo	0	6	3
WC	(China) Lu Jiajing	2	6	6
14	(Canada) Marina Stakusic	6	3	4

Qualifying competition
4	(Romania) Elena-Gabriela Ruse	6	6
WC	(China) Lu Jiajing	3	1

==== Fifth qualifier ====
First round
5	(Slovakia) Rebecca Šramková	6	3	4
(Slovenia) Tamara Zidanšek	2	6	3^{r}
Polina Kudermetova	6^{3}	6	6
17	(Czech Republic) Linda Fruhvirtová	7^{7}	1	2

Qualifying competition
5	(Slovakia) Rebecca Šramková	5	7	7^{7}
Polina Kudermetova	7	5	6^{5}

==== Sixth qualifier ====
First round
6	(United States) Hailey Baptiste	6	6
WC	(China) Zhang Ruien	3	3
(Australia) Priscilla Hon	6	6
18	(Netherlands) Suzan Lamens	4	3

Qualifying competition
6	(United States) Hailey Baptiste	6	6
(Australia) Priscilla Hon	4	4

==== Seventh qualifier ====
First round
7	(Spain) Sara Sorribes Tormo	6	6
(Netherlands) Arianne Hartono	2	2
(United States) Varvara Lepchenko	0	3
23	(Turkey) Zeynep Sönmez	6	6

Qualifying competition
7	(Spain) Sara Sorribes Tormo	6	6
23	(Turkey) Zeynep Sönmez	1	1

==== Eighth qualifier ====
First round
8	(Australia) Arina Rodionova	6	6
WC	(China) You Xiaodi	4	0
Sofya Lansere	0^{r}
16	(Japan) Mai Hontama	3

Qualifying competition
8	(Australia) Arina Rodionova	7	6
16	(Japan) Mai Hontama	5	0

==== Ninth qualifier ====
First round
9	(United States) Alycia Parks	6	3
WC	(China) Guo Hanyu	0	0^{r}
(Georgia (country)) Mariam Bolkvadze	3	1
13	(Germany) Tamara Korpatsch	6	6

Qualifying competition
9	(United States) Alycia Parks	7^{7}	6
13	(Germany) Tamara Korpatsch	6^{5}	4

==== Tenth qualifier ====
First round
10	(Ukraine) Yuliia Starodubtseva	6	6
(Canada) Carol Zhao	2	2
(South Korea) Jang Su-jeong	6	6
24	(United States) Sachia Vickery	4	4

Qualifying competition
10	(Ukraine) Yuliia Starodubtseva	6	6
(South Korea) Jang Su-jeong	0	2

==== Eleventh qualifier ====
First round
11	(Spain) Rebeka Masarova	4	0
PR	(Kazakhstan) Zarina Diyas	6	6
(United Kingdom) Heather Watson	2	6	6
20	(France) Elsa Jacquemot	6	2	1

Qualifying competition
PR	(Kazakhstan) Zarina Diyas	6	6
(United Kingdom) Heather Watson	0	2

==== Twelfth qualifier ====
First round
12	(United States) Emina Bektas	6	6
WC	(China) Wei Zhangqian	4	1
(Thailand) Mananchaya Sawangkaew	6	6^{5}	6
21	(Japan) Nao Hibino	2	7^{7}	1

Qualifying competition
12	(United States) Emina Bektas	4	2
(Thailand) Mananchaya Sawangkaew	6	6
