= 2024 China Open – Men's doubles =

Men's doubles
- 2024 China Open

Final
- Champions: (Italy) Simone Bolelli (Italy) Andrea Vavassori
- Runners-up: (Finland) Harri Heliövaara (United Kingdom) Henry Patten
- Score: 4–6, 6–3, [10–5]

Events
Singles	men	women
Doubles	men	women
- China Open

Simone Bolelli and Andrea Vavassori defeated Harri Heliövaara and Henry Patten in the final, 4–6, 6–3, [10–5] to win the men's doubles tennis title at the 2024 China Open.

Ivan Dodig and Austin Krajicek were the defending champions, but chose not to participate together. Dodig partnered Rohan Bopanna, but lost in the first round to Francisco Cerúndolo and Nicolás Jarry. Krajicek partnered Rajeev Ram, but lost in the first round to Wesley Koolhof and Nikola Mektić.

== Seeds ==
1. (Italy) Simone Bolelli / (Italy) Andrea Vavassori (champions)
2. (India) Rohan Bopanna / (Croatia) Ivan Dodig (first round)
3. (Finland) Harri Heliövaara / (United Kingdom) Henry Patten (final)
4. (United Kingdom) Neal Skupski / (New Zealand) Michael Venus (first round)

== Draw ==
Key

- Q = Qualifier
- WC = Wild card
- LL = Lucky loser
- Alt = Alternate
- ITF = ITF entry
- PR = Protected ranking
- SR = Special ranking
- SE = Special exempt
- JE = Junior exempt
- JR = Junior Accelerator Programme entrant
- CO = College Accelerator Programme entrant
- NG = Next Gen Accelerator Program entrant
- w/o = Walkover
- r = Retired
- d = Defaulted

=== Draw ===
First round
1	(Italy) S Bolelli (Italy) A Vavassori	7	6
WC	(China) A Wang (China) Y Zhou	5	1
(Kazakhstan) A Bublik (Spain) P Martínez	6	6
WC	(China) Y Bu (Switzerland) S Wawrinka	3	4
4	(United Kingdom) N Skupski (New Zealand) M Venus	2	7^{7}	[7]
(Italy) F Cobolli (Italy) L Musetti	6	6^{4}	[10]
(United States) A Krajicek (United States) R Ram	4	6	[7]
(Netherlands) W Koolhof (Croatia) N Mektić	6	3	[10]
LL	(Ecuador) G Escobar (Ecuador) D Hidalgo	2	6	[9]
(Mexico) S González (France) É Roger-Vasselin	6	1	[11]
PR	(Spain) R Carballés Baena (Spain) P Carreño Busta	3	6^{4}
3	(Finland) H Heliövaara (United Kingdom) H Patten	6	7^{7}
(Brazil) R Matos (Brazil) M Melo	6^{7}	6	[10]
Q	(United Kingdom) J Murray (Australia) J Peers	7^{9}	3	[12]
(Argentina) F Cerúndolo (Chile) N Jarry	7	7^{7}
2	(India) R Bopanna (Croatia) I Dodig	5	6^{4}

Quarterfinals
1	(Italy) S Bolelli (Italy) A Vavassori	6	7
(Kazakhstan) A Bublik (Spain) P Martínez	0	5
(Italy) F Cobolli (Italy) L Musetti	4	5
(Netherlands) W Koolhof (Croatia) N Mektić	6	7
(Mexico) S González (France) É Roger-Vasselin	4	2
3	(Finland) H Heliövaara (United Kingdom) H Patten	6	6
Q	(United Kingdom) J Murray (Australia) J Peers	6	1	[11]
(Argentina) F Cerúndolo (Chile) N Jarry	3	6	[9]

Semifinals
1	(Italy) S Bolelli (Italy) A Vavassori	7^{7}	6
(Netherlands) W Koolhof (Croatia) N Mektić	6^{1}	2
3	(Finland) H Heliövaara (United Kingdom) H Patten	7	6
Q	(United Kingdom) J Murray (Australia) J Peers	5	1

Final
1	(Italy) S Bolelli (Italy) A Vavassori	4	6	[10]
3	(Finland) H Heliövaara (United Kingdom) H Patten	6	3	[5]

== Qualifying ==
=== Seeds ===
1. (United Kingdom) Jamie Murray / (Australia) John Peers (qualified)
2. (Mexico) Miguel Ángel Reyes-Varela / (Australia) John-Patrick Smith (first round)

=== Qualifiers ===
1. (United Kingdom) Jamie Murray / (Australia) John Peers

=== Lucky losers ===
1. (Ecuador) Gonzalo Escobar / (Ecuador) Diego Hidalgo

=== Qualifying draw ===
First round
1	(United Kingdom) Jamie Murray (Australia) John Peers	6	6
WC	(China) Jin Yuquan (China) Li Zekai	1	4
(Ecuador) Gonzalo Escobar (Ecuador) Diego Hidalgo	7^{7}	7^{8}
2/Alt	(Mexico) Miguel Ángel Reyes-Varela (Australia) John-Patrick Smith	6^{3}	6^{6}

Qualifying competition
1	(United Kingdom) Jamie Murray (Australia) John Peers	6^{7}	7^{9}	[12]
(Ecuador) Gonzalo Escobar (Ecuador) Diego Hidalgo	7^{9}	6^{7}	[10]
