= 2024 Rio Open =

Professional men's tennis tournament played on outdoor clay courts

- Date: 19–25 February
- Edition: 10th
- Draw: 32S / 16D
- Prize money: $2,100,230
- Surface: Clay - outdoor
- Location: Rio de Janeiro, Brazil
- Venue: Jockey Club Brasileiro

Champions

Singles
- (Argentina) Sebastián Báez

Doubles
- (Colombia) Nicolás Barrientos / (Brazil) Rafael Matos
← 2023 ·	Rio Open	· 2025 →

The 2024 Rio Open, also known as Rio Open presented by Claro for sponsorship reasons, was a professional men's tennis tournament played on outdoor clay courts. It was the 10th edition of the Rio Open, and part of the ATP Tour 500 tournaments of the 2024 ATP Tour. It took place in Rio de Janeiro, Brazil between February 19–25, 2024.

== Champions ==
=== Singles ===
- (Argentina) Sebastián Báez def. (Argentina) Mariano Navone 6–2, 6–1

=== Doubles ===
- (Colombia) Nicolás Barrientos / (Brazil) Rafael Matos def. (Austria) Alexander Erler / (Austria) Lucas Miedler 6–4, 6–3

== Singles main-draw entrants ==
=== Seeds ===
Country	Player	Rank^{1}	Seed
ESP	Carlos Alcaraz	2	1
GBR	Cameron Norrie	20	2
CHI	Nicolás Jarry	21	3
ARG	Francisco Cerúndolo	22	4
ARG	Sebastián Báez	30	5
SRB	Laslo Djere	35	6
FRA	Arthur Fils	36	7
AUT	Sebastian Ofner	38	8

- ^{1} Rankings are as of 12 February 2024.

=== Other entrants ===
The following players received wildcards into the singles main draw:

- (Brazil) João Fonseca
- (Brazil) Gustavo Heide
- (Brazil) Thiago Monteiro

The following players received entry from the qualifying draw:

- (Argentina) Francisco Comesaña
- (Brazil) Felipe Meligeni Alves
- (France) Corentin Moutet
- (Argentina) Mariano Navone

=== Withdrawals ===
- (Germany) Daniel Altmaier → replaced by (Chile) Cristian Garín
- (Croatia) Marin Čilić → replaced by (Colombia) Daniel Elahi Galán
- (Argentina) Tomás Martín Etcheverry → replaced by (Bolivia) Hugo Dellien

== Doubles main-draw entrants ==
=== Seeds ===
Country	Player	Country	Player	Rank^{1}	Seed
USA	Rajeev Ram	GBR	Joe Salisbury	11	1
ESP	Marcel Granollers	ARG	Horacio Zeballos	23	2
ARG	Máximo González	ARG	Andrés Molteni	26	3
GER	Kevin Krawietz	GER	Tim Pütz	31	4

- ^{1} Rankings as of 12 February 2024.

=== Other entrants ===
The following pairs received wildcards into the doubles main draw:

- (Brazil) Marcelo Demoliner / (Brazil) Felipe Meligeni Alves
- (Brazil) Fernando Romboli / (Brazil) Thiago Seyboth Wild

The following pair received entry from the qualifying draw:

- (Brazil) João Fonseca / (Brazil) Marcelo Zormann

=== Withdrawals ===
- (Argentina) Pedro Cachín / (Argentina) Tomás Martín Etcheverry → replaced by (Colombia) Nicolás Barrientos / (Brazil) Rafael Matos
