= 2024 Queen's Club Championships – Singles =

Singles
- 2024 Queen's Club Championships

Final
- Champion: (United States) Tommy Paul
- Runner-up: (Italy) Lorenzo Musetti
- Score: 6–1, 7–6^{(10–8)}

Details
- Draw: 32 (4Q / 3WC)
- Seeds: 8

Events
Singles	Doubles
- Queen's Club Championships

Tommy Paul defeated Lorenzo Musetti in the final, 6–1, 7–6^{(10–8)} to win the singles tennis title at the 2024 Queen's Club Championships. It was his third career ATP Tour title, and first on grass. Paul was the first American to win the tournament since Sam Querrey in 2010.

Carlos Alcaraz was the defending champion, but lost in the second round to Jack Draper. This marked the end of Alcaraz's 13-match winning streak on grass.

Milos Raonic served 47 aces in his first-round victory against Cameron Norrie — the most served in a best-of-three-set match — and broke the record previously held by Ivo Karlović with 45 aces, dating back to the 2015 Halle Open.

This tournament also marked the final professional singles appearance of three-time major singles champion, two-time Olympic singles gold medalist, and former world No. 1 Andy Murray. He retired from his second round match against Jordan Thompson due to a back injury, after scoring his 739th and final career victory in his 1000th match against Alexei Popyrin in the first round.

== Seeds ==
1. (Spain) Carlos Alcaraz (second round)
2. (Australia) Alex de Minaur (first round)
3. (Bulgaria) Grigor Dimitrov (second round)
4. (United States) Taylor Fritz (quarterfinals)
5. (United States) Tommy Paul (champion)
6. (United States) Ben Shelton (first round)
7. (Denmark) Holger Rune (first round)
8. (France) Ugo Humbert (first round)

== Draw ==
Key

- Q = Qualifier
- WC = Wild card
- LL = Lucky loser
- Alt = Alternate
- ITF = ITF entry
- PR = Protected ranking
- SR = Special ranking
- SE = Special exempt
- JE = Junior exempt
- JR = Junior Accelerator Programme entrant
- CO = College Accelerator Programme entrant
- NG = Next Gen Accelerator Program entrant
- w/o = Walkover
- r = Retired
- d = Defaulted

=== Finals ===
Semifinals
5	(United States) Tommy Paul	6	7^{7}
(United States) Sebastian Korda	4	6^{2}
(Australia) Jordan Thompson	3	6	3
(Italy) Lorenzo Musetti	6	3	6

Final
5	(United States) Tommy Paul	6	7^{10}
(Italy) Lorenzo Musetti	1	6^{8}

=== Top half ===
First round
1	(Spain) C Alcaraz	6	7
(Argentina) F Cerúndolo	1	5
(Argentina) M Navone	3	2
(United Kingdom) J Draper	6	6
(Chile) A Tabilo	7^{8}	3	6
(Spain) A Davidovich Fokina	6^{6}	6	1
(Argentina) S Báez	4	4
5	(United States) T Paul	6	6
3	(Bulgaria) G Dimitrov	6	6
(France) A Mannarino	1	2
(United States) S Korda	7	7^{7}
K Khachanov	5	6^{5}
Q	(Australia) R Hijikata	7	4	1
(United States) F Tiafoe	5	6	0^{r}
(Italy) M Arnaldi	3	6	7^{8}
8	(France) U Humbert	6	1	6^{6}

Second round
1	(Spain) C Alcaraz	6^{3}	3
(United Kingdom) J Draper	7^{7}	6
(Chile) A Tabilo	3	4
5	(United States) T Paul	6	6
3	(Bulgaria) G Dimitrov	4	6	5
(United States) S Korda	6	3	7
Q	(Australia) R Hijikata	7^{7}	7^{9}
(Italy) M Arnaldi	6^{0}	6^{7}

Quarterfinals
(United Kingdom) J Draper	3	7	4
5	(United States) T Paul	6	5	6
(United States) S Korda	6^{4}	6	6
Q	(Australia) R Hijikata	7^{7}	3	4

Semifinals
5	(United States) T Paul	6	7^{7}
(United States) S Korda	4	6^{2}

=== Bottom half ===
First round
7	(Denmark) H Rune	6	6^{4}	3
(Australia) J Thompson	4	7^{7}	6
WC	(United Kingdom) A Murray	6	3	6
Q	(Australia) A Popyrin	3	6	3
PR	(Canada) M Raonic	6^{6}	6	7^{11}
(United Kingdom) C Norrie	7^{8}	3	6^{9}
Q	(Japan) T Daniel	3	3
4	(United States) T Fritz	6	6
6	(United States) B Shelton	3	6^{3}
Q	(France) G Mpetshi Perricard	6	7^{7}
(Argentina) TM Etcheverry	4	6	3
WC	(United Kingdom) B Harris	6	3	6
WC	(United Kingdom) D Evans	6	3	0^{r}
SE	(United States) B Nakashima	4	6	0
(Italy) L Musetti	1	6	6
2	(Australia) A de Minaur	6	4	2

Second round
(Australia) J Thompson	4
WC	(United Kingdom) A Murray	1^{r}
PR	(Canada) M Raonic	6^{5}	4
4	(United States) T Fritz	7^{7}	6
Q	(France) G Mpetshi Perricard	4	5
WC	(United Kingdom) B Harris	6	7
SE	(United States) B Nakashima	4	6	4
(Italy) L Musetti	6	4	6

Quarterfinals
(Australia) J Thompson	6	6
4	(United States) T Fritz	4	3
WC	(United Kingdom) B Harris	3	5
(Italy) L Musetti	6	7

Semifinals
(Australia) J Thompson	3	6	3
(Italy) L Musetti	6	3	6

== Qualifying ==
=== Seeds ===
1. (Australia) Alexei Popyrin (qualified)
2. (France) Giovanni Mpetshi Perricard (qualified)
3. (France) Arthur Rinderknech (qualifying competition)
4. (Italy) Luca Nardi (first round)
5. (United States) Mackenzie McDonald (qualifying competition)
6. (France) Arthur Cazaux (first round)
7. (Australia) Rinky Hijikata (qualified)
8. (Belgium) Zizou Bergs (qualifying competition)

=== Qualifiers ===
1. (Australia) Alexei Popyrin
2. (France) Giovanni Mpetshi Perricard
3. (Australia) Rinky Hijikata
4. (Japan) Taro Daniel

=== Draw ===
==== First qualifier ====
First round
1	(Australia) Alexei Popyrin	6	6
Alt	(Finland) Otto Virtanen	4	4
WC	(United Kingdom) Paul Jubb	2	1
5	(United States) Mackenzie McDonald	6	6

Qualifying competition
1	(Australia) Alexei Popyrin	6	6
5	(United States) Mackenzie McDonald	3	4

==== Second qualifier ====
First round
2	(France) Giovanni Mpetshi Perricard	6	3	6
(Australia) Aleksandar Vukic	3	6	3
WC	(United Kingdom) Jan Choinski	6^{3}	7^{7}	2
8/Alt	(Belgium) Zizou Bergs	7^{7}	6^{5}	6

Qualifying competition
2	(France) Giovanni Mpetshi Perricard	7	4	6
8/Alt	(Belgium) Zizou Bergs	5	6	3

==== Third qualifier ====
First round
3	(France) Arthur Rinderknech	6	7
(United States) Aleksandar Kovacevic	4	5
WC	(United Kingdom) Henry Searle	4	3
7	(Australia) Rinky Hijikata	6	6

Qualifying competition
3	(France) Arthur Rinderknech	5	3
7	(Australia) Rinky Hijikata	7	6

==== Fourth qualifier ====
First round
4	(Italy) Luca Nardi	2	7^{7}	5
(Australia) Thanasi Kokkinakis	6	6^{3}	7
(Japan) Taro Daniel	6^{5}	6	6
6	(France) Arthur Cazaux	7^{7}	4	4

Qualifying competition
(Australia) Thanasi Kokkinakis
(Japan) Taro Daniel	w/o
