= 2024 China Open – Men's singles =

Men's singles
- 2024 China Open

Final
- Champion: (Spain) Carlos Alcaraz
- Runner-up: (Italy) Jannik Sinner
- Score: 6–7^{(6–8)}, 6–4, 7–6^{(7–3)}

Details
- Draw: 32 (4Q / 3WC)
- Seeds: 8

Events
Singles	men	women
Doubles	men	women
- China Open

Carlos Alcaraz defeated defending champion Jannik Sinner in the final, 6–7^{(6–8)}, 6–4, 7–6^{(7–3)} to win the men's singles tennis title at the 2024 China Open. It was his 16th career ATP Tour title. Alcaraz became the first player since 2009 to win an ATP 500 singles title on every surface – clay, grass and hard.

Bu Yunchaokete became the first Chinese man to reach the semifinals in the tournament's history after his win over Andrey Rublev in the quarterfinals.

== Seeds ==
1. (Italy) Jannik Sinner (final)
2. (Spain) Carlos Alcaraz (champion)
3. Daniil Medvedev (semifinals)
4. Andrey Rublev (quarterfinals)
5. (Bulgaria) Grigor Dimitrov (withdrew)
6. (Italy) Lorenzo Musetti (second round)
7. Karen Khachanov (quarterfinals)
8. (Kazakhstan) Alexander Bublik (first round)

== Draw ==
Key

- Q = Qualifier
- WC = Wild card
- LL = Lucky loser
- Alt = Alternate
- ITF = ITF entry
- PR = Protected ranking
- SR = Special ranking
- SE = Special exempt
- JE = Junior exempt
- JR = Junior Accelerator Programme entrant
- CO = College Accelerator Programme entrant
- NG = Next Gen Accelerator Program entrant
- w/o = Walkover
- r = Retired
- d = Defaulted

=== Finals ===
Semifinals
1	(Italy) Jannik Sinner	6	7^{7}
WC	(China) Bu Yunchaokete	3	6^{3}
3	Daniil Medvedev	5	3
2	(Spain) Carlos Alcaraz	7	6

Final
1	(Italy) Jannik Sinner	7^{8}	4	6^{3}
2	(Spain) Carlos Alcaraz	6^{6}	6	7^{7}

=== Top half ===
First round
1	(Italy) J Sinner	4	6	6
(Chile) N Jarry	6	3	1
LL	R Safiullin	6	6
WC	(Switzerland) S Wawrinka	3	4
(Czech Republic) J Lehečka	7^{7}	6
(Spain) P Martínez	6^{4}	2
Q	(Spain) R Bautista Agut	6	6
LL	(France) A Rinderknech	3	4
4	A Rublev	6	4	6
PR	(Spain) P Carreño Busta	0	6	4
(Spain) A Davidovich Fokina	6	4	6
(China) Z Zhang	3	6	3
SE	(China) J Shang	7^{7}	2	4
WC	(China) Y Bu	6^{3}	6	6
Q	(Belgium) Z Bergs	5	6	3
6	(Italy) L Musetti	7	4	6

Second round
1	(Italy) J Sinner	3	6	6
LL	R Safiullin	6	2	3
(Czech Republic) J Lehečka	3	6	6
Q	(Spain) R Bautista Agut	6	2	1
4	A Rublev	6	7
(Spain) A Davidovich Fokina	4	5
WC	(China) Y Bu	6	6
6	(Italy) L Musetti	2	4

Quarterfinals
1	(Italy) J Sinner	6	7^{8}
(Czech Republic) J Lehečka	2	6^{6}
4	A Rublev	5	4
WC	(China) Y Bu	7	6

Semifinals
1	(Italy) J Sinner	6	7^{7}
WC	(China) Y Bu	3	6^{3}

=== Bottom half ===
First round
8	(Kazakhstan) A Bublik	6	1	6^{4}
(Italy) F Cobolli	4	6	7^{7}
WC	(China) Y Zhou	6	3	5
Q	P Kotov	1	6	7
(France) A Mannarino	1	6	6
(Italy) L Sonego	6	2	3
(France) G Monfils	3	4
3	D Medvedev	6	6
7	K Khachanov	6	6
LL	(Spain) R Carballés Baena	4	4
(Argentina) F Cerúndolo	7^{7}	6
Q	(Czech Republic) J Menšík	6^{4}	1
(Netherlands) T Griekspoor	6^{3}	6	6
(Serbia) M Kecmanović	7^{7}	4	3
(France) G Mpetshi Perricard	4	4
2	(Spain) C Alcaraz	6	6

Second round
(Italy) F Cobolli	6	6
Q	P Kotov	4	2
(France) A Mannarino	6^{6}	2
3	D Medvedev	7^{8}	6
7	K Khachanov	7^{7}	7^{11}
(Argentina) F Cerúndolo	6^{4}	6^{9}
(Netherlands) T Griekspoor	1	2
2	(Spain) C Alcaraz	6	6

Quarterfinals
(Italy) F Cobolli	2	4
3	D Medvedev	6	6
7	K Khachanov	5	2
2	(Spain) C Alcaraz	7	6

Semifinals
3	D Medvedev	5	3
2	(Spain) C Alcaraz	7	6

== Qualifying ==
=== Seeds ===
1. (Serbia) Miomir Kecmanović (moved to main draw)
2. (Spain) Roberto Carballés Baena (qualifying competition, lucky loser)
3. Roman Safiullin (qualifying competition, lucky loser)
4. (France) Arthur Rinderknech (qualifying competition, lucky loser)
5. (Kazakhstan) Alexander Shevchenko (first round)
6. Pavel Kotov (qualified)
7. (Spain) Roberto Bautista Agut (qualified)
8. (Czech Republic) Jakub Menšík (qualified)

=== Qualifiers ===
1. (Belgium) Zizou Bergs
2. Pavel Kotov
3. (Spain) Roberto Bautista Agut
4. (Czech Republic) Jakub Menšík

=== Lucky losers ===
1. (Spain) Roberto Carballés Baena
2. Roman Safiullin
3. (France) Arthur Rinderknech

=== Qualifying draw ===
==== First qualifier ====
First round
Alt	(Germany) Yannick Hanfmann	2	4
(Belgium) Zizou Bergs	6	6
(France) Corentin Moutet	6	7
5	(Kazakhstan) Alexander Shevchenko	4	5

Qualifying competition
(Belgium) Zizou Bergs	6	6
(France) Corentin Moutet	4	4

==== Second qualifier ====
First round
2	(Spain) Roberto Carballés Baena	6	6
WC	(China) Te Rigele	3	3
(India) Sumit Nagal	2	6^{5}
6	Pavel Kotov	6	7^{7}

Qualifying competition
2	(Spain) Roberto Carballés Baena	6^{3}	6	3
6	Pavel Kotov	7^{7}	4	6

==== Third qualifier ====
First round
3	Roman Safiullin	6	6
WC	(China) Wang Aoran	3	2
Alt	(United Kingdom) Billy Harris	7	6^{5}	3
7	(Spain) Roberto Bautista Agut	5	7^{7}	6

Qualifying competition
3	Roman Safiullin	5	6	4
7	(Spain) Roberto Bautista Agut	7	3	6

==== Fourth qualifier ====
First round
4	(France) Arthur Rinderknech	3	6	6
(Italy) Fabio Fognini	6	2	3
(France) Hugo Gaston	0	6	3
8	(Czech Republic) Jakub Menšík	6	4	6

Qualifying competition
4	(France) Arthur Rinderknech	2	7	2
8	(Czech Republic) Jakub Menšík	6	5	6
