= 2024 Rio Open – Singles =

Singles
- 2024 Rio Open

Final
- Champion: (Argentina) Sebastián Báez
- Runner-up: (Argentina) Mariano Navone
- Score: 6–2, 6–1

Details
- Draw: 32 (4 Q / 3 WC )
- Seeds: 8

Events
Singles	Doubles
- Rio Open

Sebastián Báez defeated Mariano Navone in the final, 6–2, 6–1 to win the singles tennis title at the 2024 Rio Open. It was his fifth ATP Tour title and his first ATP 500 title. Navone was the second qualifier to contest the Rio Open final, following Gianluca Mager in 2020.

Cameron Norrie was the defending champion, but lost in the semifinals to Navone.

This marked the first time, in ten editions, that the tournament had three Brazilians in the quarterfinals.

== Seeds ==
1. (Spain) Carlos Alcaraz (first round, retired)
2. (United Kingdom) Cameron Norrie (semifinals)
3. (Chile) Nicolás Jarry (first round)
4. (Argentina) Francisco Cerúndolo (semifinals)
5. (Argentina) Sebastián Báez (champion)
6. (Serbia) Laslo Djere (second round)
7. (France) Arthur Fils (first round)
8. (Austria) Sebastian Ofner (first round)

== Draw ==
Key

- Q = Qualifier
- WC = Wild card
- LL = Lucky loser
- Alt = Alternate
- ITF = ITF entry
- PR = Protected ranking
- SR = Special ranking
- SE = Special exempt
- JE = Junior exempt
- JR = Junior Accelerator Programme entrant
- CO = College Accelerator Programme entrant
- NG = Next Gen Accelerator Program entrant
- w/o = Walkover
- r = Retired
- d = Defaulted

=== Finals ===
Semifinals
5	(Argentina) Sebastián Báez	7	6
4	(Argentina) Francisco Cerúndolo	5	0
Q	(Argentina) Mariano Navone	6	6
2	(United Kingdom) Cameron Norrie	4	2

Final
5	(Argentina) Sebastián Báez	6	6
Q	(Argentina) Mariano Navone	2	1

=== Top half ===
First round
1	(Spain) C Alcaraz	1^{r}
WC	(Brazil) T Monteiro	1
Q	(Brazil) F Meligeni Alves	6	3	6
(Argentina) P Cachín	2	6	3
(Argentina) F Díaz Acosta	7	6
(Switzerland) S Wawrinka	5	4
Q	(France) C Moutet	4	3
5	(Argentina) S Báez	6	6
4	(Argentina) F Cerúndolo	6	1	6
Q	(Argentina) F Comesaña	1	6	2
(Peru) JP Varillas	6	3	5
(Spain) A Ramos Viñolas	3	6	7
(Serbia) D Lajović	4	7^{10}	6
(Colombia) DE Galán	6	6^{8}	1
(Spain) B Zapata Miralles	3	1
6	(Serbia) L Djere	6	6

Second round
WC	(Brazil) T Monteiro	7	6
Q	(Brazil) F Meligeni Alves	5	3
(Argentina) F Díaz Acosta	6^{1}	3
5	(Argentina) S Báez	7^{7}	6
4	(Argentina) F Cerúndolo	6	6
(Spain) A Ramos Viñolas	2	1
(Serbia) D Lajović	6	7
6	(Serbia) L Djere	2	5

Quarterfinals
WC	(Brazil) T Monteiro	4	6	2
5	(Argentina) S Báez	6	1	6
4	(Argentina) F Cerúndolo	3	6	6
(Serbia) D Lajović	6	4	4

Semifinals
5	(Argentina) S Báez	7	6
4	(Argentina) F Cerúndolo	5	0

=== Bottom half ===
First round
7	(France) A Fils	0	4
WC	(Brazil) J Fonseca	6	6
(Spain) R Carballés Baena	6	6^{1}	3
(Chile) C Garín	2	7^{7}	6
(Argentina) F Coria	6	4	2
Q	(Argentina) M Navone	1	6	6
(Germany) Y Hanfmann	6	1	7
3	(Chile) N Jarry	1	6	5
8	(Austria) S Ofner	3	1
(Spain) J Munar	6	6
(Chile) A Tabilo	6	4	4
(Brazil) T Seyboth Wild	2	6	6
WC	(Brazil) G Heide	5	3
(Chile) T Barrios Vera	7	6
(Bolivia) H Dellien	3	2
2	(United Kingdom) C Norrie	6	6

Second round
WC	(Brazil) J Fonseca	6	6
(Chile) C Garín	4	4
Q	(Argentina) M Navone	6	6
(Germany) Y Hanfmann	1	2
(Spain) J Munar	2	6	3
(Brazil) T Seyboth Wild	6	4	6
(Chile) T Barrios Vera	1	1
2	(United Kingdom) C Norrie	6	6

Quarterfinals
WC	(Brazil) J Fonseca	6	3	3
Q	(Argentina) M Navone	2	6	6
(Brazil) T Seyboth Wild	1	6	2
2	(United Kingdom) C Norrie	6	3	6

Semifinals
Q	(Argentina) M Navone	6	6
2	(United Kingdom) C Norrie	4	2

== Qualifying ==
=== Seeds ===
1. (Italy) Luciano Darderi (first round)
2. (Spain) Pedro Martínez (first round)
3. (Argentina) Thiago Agustín Tirante (first round)
4. (Argentina) Mariano Navone (qualified)
5. (Argentina) Francisco Comesaña (qualified)
6. (Chile) Tomás Barrios Vera (moved to main draw)
7. (Slovakia) Alex Molčan (first round)
8. (Argentina) Camilo Ugo Carabelli (first round, retired)

=== Qualifiers ===
1. (Brazil) Felipe Meligeni Alves
2. (France) Corentin Moutet
3. (Argentina) Francisco Comesaña
4. (Argentina) Mariano Navone

=== Qualifying draw ===
==== First qualifier ====
First round
1	(Italy) Luciano Darderi	2	2
(Argentina) Juan Manuel Cerúndolo	6	6
(Brazil) Felipe Meligeni Alves	6	6
7	(Slovakia) Alex Molčan	2	3

Qualifying competition
(Argentina) Juan Manuel Cerúndolo	3	6^{6}
(Brazil) Felipe Meligeni Alves	6	7^{8}

==== Second qualifier ====
First round
2	(Spain) Pedro Martínez	3	4
WC	(Brazil) Matheus Pucinelli de Almeida	6	6
(France) Corentin Moutet	6	4
8	(Argentina) Camilo Ugo Carabelli	3	1^{r}

Qualifying competition
WC	(Brazil) Matheus Pucinelli de Almeida	4	3
(France) Corentin Moutet	6	6

==== Third qualifier ====
First round
3	(Argentina) Thiago Agustín Tirante	6	4	1
(Italy) Andrea Pellegrino	1	6	6
Alt	(Argentina) Román Andrés Burruchaga	2	2
5	(Argentina) Francisco Comesaña	6	6

Qualifying competition
(Italy) Andrea Pellegrino	3	2
5	(Argentina) Francisco Comesaña	6	6

==== Fourth qualifier ====
First round
4	(Argentina) Mariano Navone	6	6
WC	(Brazil) Mateus Alves	4	3
WC	(Brazil) João Lucas Reis da Silva	5	1
Alt	(Argentina) Genaro Alberto Olivieri	7	6

Qualifying competition
4	(Argentina) Mariano Navone	6	7^{7}
Alt	(Argentina) Genaro Alberto Olivieri	1	6^{3}
