= 2024 Queen's Club Championships =

- Date: 17–23 June
- Edition: 121st
- Category: ATP Tour 500 series
- Draw: 32S / 16D
- Prize money: €2,255,655
- Surface: Grass
- Location: London, United Kingdom
- Venue: Queen's Club

Champions

Singles
- (United States) Tommy Paul

Doubles
- (United Kingdom) Neal Skupski / (New Zealand) Michael Venus
- Queen's Club Championships

The 2024 Queen's Club Championships (also known as the Cinch Championships for sponsorship reasons) was a men's professional tennis tournament played on outdoor grass courts at the Queen's Club in London, United Kingdom from 17 to 23 June 2024. It was the 121st edition of the event and is classified as an ATP Tour 500 tournament on the 2024 ATP Tour.

== Finals ==
=== Singles ===
- (United States) Tommy Paul def. (Italy) Lorenzo Musetti, 6–1, 7–6^{(10–8)}

=== Doubles ===
- (United Kingdom) Neal Skupski / (New Zealand) Michael Venus def. (United States) Taylor Fritz / Karen Khachanov, 4–6, 7–6^{(7–5)}, [10–8]

== ATP singles main-draw entrants ==
=== Seeds ===
Country	Player	Rank^{1}	Seed
ESP	Carlos Alcaraz	2	1
AUS	Alex de Minaur	9	2
BUL	Grigor Dimitrov	10	3
USA	Taylor Fritz	12	4
USA	Tommy Paul	13	5
USA	Ben Shelton	14	6
DEN	Holger Rune	15	7
FRA	Ugo Humbert	16	8

- ^{1} Rankings are as of 10 June 2024.

=== Other entrants ===
The following players received wildcards into the main draw:

- (United Kingdom) Dan Evans
- (United Kingdom) Billy Harris
- (United Kingdom) Andy Murray

The following player received entry using a protected ranking:

- (Canada) Milos Raonic

The following player received entry as a special exempt:

- (United States) Brandon Nakashima

The following players received entry from the qualifying draw:

- (Japan) Taro Daniel
- (Australia) Rinky Hijikata
- (France) Giovanni Mpetshi Perricard
- (Australia) Alexei Popyrin

=== Withdrawals ===
- (Czech Republic) Jiří Lehečka → replaced by (Italy) Matteo Arnaldi

== ATP doubles main-draw entrants ==
=== Seeds ===
Country	Player	Country	Player	Rank^{1}	Seed
IND	Rohan Bopanna	AUS	Matthew Ebden	5	1
USA	Rajeev Ram	GBR	Joe Salisbury	11	2
ESA	Marcelo Arévalo	CRO	Mate Pavić	16	3
CRO	Ivan Dodig	USA	Austin Krajicek	28	4
NED	Wesley Koolhof	CRO	Nikola Mektic	29	5
MEX	Santiago González	FRA	Édouard Roger-Vasselin	30	6
GBR	Neal Skupski	NZL	Michael Venus	38	7
AUT	Alexander Erler	AUT	Lucas Miedler	80	8

- ^{1} Rankings are as of 10 June 2024.

=== Other entrants ===
The following pairs received wildcards into the doubles main draw:

- (United Kingdom) Jack Draper / (United Kingdom) Cameron Norrie
- ~~(United Kingdom) Dan Evans / (United Kingdom) Andy Murray~~

The following pair received entry from the qualifying draw:

- (United Kingdom) Julian Cash / (United States) Robert Galloway

The following pairs received entry as lucky losers:

- (Austria) Alexander Erler / (Austria) Lucas Miedler
- (Australia) John Peers / (Australia) Jordan Thompson

=== Withdrawals ===
- (United Kingdom) Dan Evans / (United Kingdom) Andy Murray → replaced by (Australia) John Peers / (Australia) Jordan Thompson
- (Argentina) Máximo González / (Argentina) Andrés Molteni → replaced by (Argentina) Francisco Cerúndolo / (Argentina) Tomás Martín Etcheverry
- (United States) Frances Tiafoe / (United States) Tommy Paul → replaced by (Austria) Alexander Erler / (Austria) Lucas Miedler
