= 2024 China Open (tennis) =

- Date: 25 September – 6 October (WTA); 26 September – 2 October (ATP)
- Edition: 23rd (ATP) / 25th (WTA)
- Category: WTA 1000 (women); ATP Tour 500 (men)
- Prize money: $13,140,000 (total)
- Surface: Hard
- Location: Beijing, China
- Venue: National Tennis Center

Champions

Men's singles
- (Spain) Carlos Alcaraz

Women's singles
- (United States) Coco Gauff

Men's doubles
- (Italy) Simone Bolelli / (Italy) Andrea Vavassori

Women's doubles
- (Italy) Sara Errani / (Italy) Jasmine Paolini
- China Open (tennis)

The 2024 China Open was a professional tennis tournament played on outdoor hardcourts. It was the 23rd edition of the China Open for men and the 25th for women. The tournament was categorized as a WTA 1000 event on the 2024 WTA Tour and an ATP 500 event on the 2024 ATP Tour. Both the women's and the men's tournaments were held at the National Tennis Center in Beijing, from 25 September to 6 October and from 26 September to 2 October respectively. This was the first year that the women's tournament was expanded to two weeks and the singles draw to 96 players.

== Points and prize money ==
=== Point distribution ===
Event	W	F	SF	QF	Round of 16	Round of 32	Round of 64	Round of 128	Q	Q2	Q1
Men's singles	500	330	200	100	50	0	—N/a	—N/a	25	13	0
Men's doubles	500	300	180	90	0	—N/a	—N/a	—N/a	45	25	0
Women's singles	1,000	650	390	215	120	65	35	10	30	20	2
Women's doubles	1,000	650	390	215	120	10	—N/a	—N/a	—N/a	—N/a	—N/a

=== Prize money ===
Event	W	F	SF	QF	Round of 16	Round of 32	Round of 64	Round of 128	Q2	Q1
Men's singles	$695,750	$374,340	$199,495	$101,925	$54,405	$29,015	—N/a	—N/a	$14,870	$8,340
Men's doubles	$228,510	$121,870	$61,660	$30,830	$15,960	—N/a	—N/a	—N/a	—N/a	—N/a
Women's singles	$1,100,000	$585,000	$325,000	$185,000	$101,000	$59,100	$34,500	$23,250	$13,500	$7,000
Women's doubles	$447,300	$236,800	$127,170	$63,600	$34,100	$18,640	—N/a	—N/a	—N/a	—N/a

== Champions ==
=== Men's singles ===
- (Spain) Carlos Alcaraz def. (Italy) Jannik Sinner

=== Women's singles ===
- (United States) Coco Gauff def. (Czech Republic) Karolína Muchová 6–1, 6–3

=== Men's doubles ===
- (Italy) Simone Bolelli / (Italy) Andrea Vavassori def. (Finland) Harri Heliövaara / (United Kingdom) Henry Patten, 4–6, 6–3, [10–5]

=== Women's doubles ===
- (Italy) Sara Errani / (Italy) Jasmine Paolini def. (Chinese Taipei) Chan Hao-ching / Veronika Kudermetova 6–4, 6–4

== ATP singles main-draw entrants ==
=== Seeds ===
Country	Player	Rank^{1}	Seed
ITA	Jannik Sinner	1	1
ESP	Carlos Alcaraz	3	2
	Daniil Medvedev	5	3
	Andrey Rublev	6	4
~~BUL~~	~~Grigor Dimitrov~~	~~10~~	~~5~~
ITA	Lorenzo Musetti	19	6
	Karen Khachanov	23	7
KAZ	Alexander Bublik	27	8

- ^{1} Rankings are as of 16 September 2024

=== Other entrants ===
The following players received wildcards into the singles main draw:

- (China) Bu Yunchaokete
- (Switzerland) Stan Wawrinka
- (China) Zhou Yi

The following player received entry as a special exempt:

- (China) Shang Juncheng

The following player received entry using a protected ranking:

- (Spain) Pablo Carreño Busta

The following players received entry from the qualifying draw:

- (Spain) Roberto Bautista Agut
- (Belgium) Zizou Bergs
- Pavel Kotov
- (Czech Republic) Jakub Menšík

The following players received entry as lucky losers:

- (Spain) Roberto Carballés Baena
- (France) Arthur Rinderknech
- Roman Safiullin

=== Withdrawals ===
- (Bulgaria) Grigor Dimitrov → replaced by (France) Arthur Rinderknech
- (United Kingdom) Cameron Norrie → replaced by (Spain) Roberto Carballés Baena
- (Germany) Jan-Lennard Struff → replaced by Roman Safiullin
- (Germany) Alexander Zverev → replaced by (Serbia) Miomir Kecmanović

== ATP doubles main-draw entrants ==
=== Seeds ===
Country	Player	Country	Player	Rank^{1}	Seed
ITA	Simone Bolelli	ITA	Andrea Vavassori	21	1
IND	Rohan Bopanna	CRO	Ivan Dodig	31	2
FIN	Harri Heliövaara	GBR	Henry Patten	32	3
GBR	Neal Skupski	NZL	Michael Venus	37	4

- Rankings are as of 16 September 2024

=== Other entrants ===
The following pairs received wildcards into the doubles main draw:

- (China) Bu Yunchaokete / (Switzerland) Stan Wawrinka
- (China) Wang Aoran / (China) Zhou Yi

The following pair received entry from the qualifying draw:

- (United Kingdom) Jamie Murray / (Australia) John Peers

The following pair received entry as lucky losers:

- (Ecuador) Gonzalo Escobar / (Ecuador) Diego Hidalgo

=== Withdrawals ===
- (Spain) Marcel Granollers / (Spain) Pedro Martínez → replaced by (Kazakhstan) Alexander Bublik / (Spain) Pedro Martínez
- (Germany) Kevin Krawietz / (Germany) Tim Pütz → replaced by (Ecuador) Gonzalo Escobar / (Ecuador) Diego Hidalgo

== WTA doubles main-draw entrants ==
=== Seeds ===
Country	Player	Country	Player	Rank^{1}	Seed
CAN	Gabriela Dabrowski	NZL	Erin Routliffe	6	1
CZE	Kateřina Siniaková	USA	Taylor Townsend	9	2
USA	Caroline Dolehide	USA	Desirae Krawczyk	21	3
USA	Nicole Melichar-Martinez	AUS	Ellen Perez	23	4
ITA	Sara Errani	ITA	Jasmine Paolini	29	5
BEL	Elise Mertens	CHN	Zhang Shuai	36	6
TPE	Chan Hao-ching		Veronika Kudermetova	44	7
NED	Demi Schuurs	BRA	Luisa Stefani	46	8

- ^{1} Rankings are as of 16 September 2024

=== Other entrants ===
The following pairs received wildcards into the doubles main draw:

- (China) Tang Qianhui / (China) Yuan Yue
- (China) Wang Xiyu / (China) Wang Yafan

The following pair received entry as alternates:

- (New Zealand) Lulu Sun / (Japan) Moyuka Uchijima

=== Withdrawals ===
- (United Kingdom) Katie Boulter / Anna Kalinskaya → replaced by (New Zealand) Lulu Sun / (Japan) Moyuka Uchijima
