= 2025 Arizona Tennis Classic – Doubles =

Doubles
- 2025 Arizona Tennis Classic

Final
- Champions: (Spain) Marcel Granollers (Argentina) Horacio Zeballos
- Runners-up: (United States) Austin Krajicek (United States) Rajeev Ram
- Score: 6–3, 7–6^{(7–2)}

Events
Singles	Doubles
← 2024 ·	Arizona Tennis Classic	· 2026 →

Sadio Doumbia and Fabien Reboul were the defending champions but lost in the semifinals to Marcel Granollers and Horacio Zeballos.

Granollers and Zeballos won the title after defeating Austin Krajicek and Rajeev Ram 6–3, 7–6^{(7–2)} in the final.

== Seeds ==
1. (Spain) Marcel Granollers / (Argentina) Horacio Zeballos (champions)
2. (Belgium) Joran Vliegen / (United States) Jackson Withrow (quarterfinals)
3. (Belgium) Sander Gillé / (Poland) Jan Zieliński (semifinals)
4. (France) Sadio Doumbia / (France) Fabien Reboul (semifinals)

== Draw ==
=== Key ===
- Q = Qualifier
- WC = Wild card
- LL = Lucky loser
- Alt = Alternate
- SE = Special exempt
- PR = Protected ranking
- ITF = ITF entry
- JE = Junior exempt
- w/o = Walkover
- r = Retired
- d = Defaulted
- SR = Special ranking

=== Draw ===
First round
1	(Spain) M Granollers (Argentina) H Zeballos	6	6
(Chinese Taipei) R Ho (United States) R Stalder	2	4
WC	(Australia) R Hijikata (Canada) B Sigouin	3	4
(Austria) A Erler (Germany) C Frantzen	6	6
4	(France) S Doumbia (France) F Reboul	4
(Japan) T Daniel (Chinese Taipei) C-h Tseng	2^{r}
(United Kingdom) J Fearnley (Australia) P Harper	4	6	[4]
(Canada) C Harper (United States) E Spizzirri	6	4	[10]
P Kotov (France) A Rinderknech	6	6
WC	(Italy) F Cobolli (Italy) Paolo Rosati	4	4
(United States) G Goldhoff (United States) T Hilderbrand	3	6	[8]
3	(Belgium) S Gillé (Poland) J Zieliński	6	4	[10]
(Kazakhstan) A Bublik (Kazakhstan) A Shevchenko
(United States) A Krajicek (United States) R Ram	w/o
(Kazakhstan) M Kukushkin; R Safiullin
2	(Belgium) J Vliegen (United States) J Withrow	w/o

Quarterfinals
1	(Spain) M Granollers (Argentina) H Zeballos	6	6
(Austria) A Erler (Germany) C Frantzen	3	4
4	(France) S Doumbia (France) F Reboul	6	6
(Canada) C Harper (United States) E Spizzirri	4	4
P Kotov (France) A Rinderknech
3	(Belgium) S Gillé (Poland) J Zieliński	w/o
(United States) A Krajicek (United States) R Ram	6	6
2	(Belgium) J Vliegen (United States) J Withrow	2	2

Semifinals
1	(Spain) M Granollers (Argentina) H Zeballos	6	6
4	(France) S Doumbia (France) F Reboul	3	4
3	(Belgium) S Gillé (Poland) J Zieliński	6	3	[5]
(United States) A Krajicek (United States) R Ram	2	6	[10]

Final
1	(Spain) M Granollers (Argentina) H Zeballos	6	7^{7}
(United States) A Krajicek (United States) R Ram	3	6^{2}
