= 2025 Arizona Tennis Classic – Singles =

Singles
- 2025 Arizona Tennis Classic

Final
- Champion: (Brazil) João Fonseca
- Runner-up: (Kazakhstan) Alexander Bublik
- Score: 7–6^{(7–5)}, 7–6^{(7–0)}

Events
Singles	Doubles
← 2024 ·	Arizona Tennis Classic	· 2026 →

Nuno Borges was the two-time defending champion but lost in the semifinals to Alexander Bublik.

João Fonseca won the title after defeating Bublik 7–6^{(7–5)}, 7–6^{(7–0)} in the final.

== Seeds ==
The top four seeds received a bye into the second round.

1. (Portugal) Nuno Borges (semifinals)
2. (Italy) Flavio Cobolli (quarterfinals)
3. (Spain) Pedro Martínez (second round)
4. (Germany) Jan-Lennard Struff (second round)
5. (Australia) Aleksandar Vukic (first round)
6. (Italy) Luca Nardi (first round)
7. Roman Safiullin (second round)
8. (France) Arthur Rinderknech (first round)

== Draw ==
=== Key ===
- Q = Qualifier
- WC = Wild card
- LL = Lucky loser
- Alt = Alternate
- SE = Special exempt
- PR = Protected ranking
- ITF = ITF entry
- JE = Junior exempt
- w/o = Walkover
- r = Retired
- d = Defaulted
- SR = Special ranking

=== Finals ===
Semifinals
1	(Portugal) Nuno Borges	3	4
(Kazakhstan) Alexander Bublik	6	6
(Brazil) João Fonseca	6	6
(Japan) Kei Nishikori	3	3

Final
(Kazakhstan) Alexander Bublik	6^{5}	6^{0}
(Brazil) João Fonseca	7^{7}	7^{7}

=== Top half ===
First round
(United Kingdom) J Fearnley	7^{7}	6
(Australia) J Duckworth	6^{3}	3
WC	(United States) C Smith	6	7
Alt	(Kazakhstan) A Shevchenko	1	5
Alt	(United States) C Eubanks	6^{2}	1
7	R Safiullin	7^{7}	6
(France) C Moutet	6	6
Q	(Georgia (country)) N Basilashvili	3	2
(Australia) R Hijikata	7^{7}	7^{7}
WC	(United States) B Holt	6^{0}	6^{3}
(Kazakhstan) A Bublik	6	3	6
5	(Australia) A Vukic	3	6	3

Second round
1	(Portugal) N Borges	6	7
(United Kingdom) J Fearnley	2	5
WC	(United States) C Smith	6	7^{7}
7	R Safiullin	4	6^{2}
3	(Spain) P Martínez	4	3
(France) C Moutet	6	6
(Australia) R Hijikata	2	7	3
(Kazakhstan) A Bublik	6	5	6

Quarterfinals
1	(Portugal) N Borges	6	6
WC	(United States) C Smith	4	4
(France) C Moutet	6	6^{4}	5
(Kazakhstan) A Bublik	2	7^{7}	7

Semifinals
1	(Portugal) N Borges	3	4
(Kazakhstan) A Bublik	6	6

=== Bottom half ===
First round
8	(France) A Rinderknech	6	5	5
Alt	(United States) R Opelka	4	7	7
(Australia) A Walton	2	4
(France) H Gaston	6	6
P Kotov	2	4
(Brazil) J Fonseca	6	6
6	(Italy) L Nardi	4	3
(Japan) K Nishikori	6	6
Q	(Kazakhstan) M Kukushkin	6	6
Q	(Japan) Y Uchiyama	4	2
Q	(Australia) L Tu	4	2
WC	(United States) E Spizzirri	6	6

Second round
Alt	(United States) R Opelka	6^{6}	3
(France) H Gaston	7^{8}	6
(Brazil) J Fonseca	6	4	6
4	(Germany) J-L Struff	1	6	3
(Japan) K Nishikori	6	2
Q	(Kazakhstan) M Kukushkin	3	1^{r}
WC	(United States) E Spizzirri	3	7	5
2	(Italy) F Cobolli	6	5	7

Quarterfinals
(France) H Gaston	4	4
(Brazil) J Fonseca	6	6
(Japan) K Nishikori	6	4	6
2	(Italy) F Cobolli	2	6	4

Semifinals
(Brazil) J Fonseca	6	6
(Japan) K Nishikori	3	3
