= 2023 Arizona Tennis Classic – Doubles =

Doubles
- 2023 Arizona Tennis Classic

Final
- Champions: (United States) Nathaniel Lammons (United States) Jackson Withrow
- Runners-up: (Monaco) Hugo Nys (Poland) Jan Zieliński
- Score: 6–7^{(1–7)}, 6–4, [10–8]

Events
Singles	Doubles
← 2022 ·	Arizona Tennis Classic	· 2024 →

Treat Huey and Denis Kudla were the defending champions but only Kudla chose to defend his title, partnering Hans Hach Verdugo. Kudla lost in the quarterfinals to Hugo Nys and Jan Zieliński.

Nathaniel Lammons and Jackson Withrow won the title after defeating Nys and Zieliński 6–7^{(1–7)}, 6–4, [10–8] in the final.

== Seeds ==
1. (United States) Rajeev Ram / (United Kingdom) Joe Salisbury (quarterfinals)
2. (Monaco) Hugo Nys / (Poland) Jan Zieliński (final)
3. (Germany) Kevin Krawietz / (France) Fabrice Martin (quarterfinals)
4. (Brazil) Rafael Matos / (Spain) David Vega Hernández (first round)

== Draw ==
=== Key ===
- Q = Qualifier
- WC = Wild card
- LL = Lucky loser
- Alt = Alternate
- SE = Special exempt
- PR = Protected ranking
- ITF = ITF entry
- JE = Junior exempt
- w/o = Walkover
- r = Retired
- d = Defaulted
- SR = Special ranking

First round
1	(United States) R Ram (United Kingdom) J Salisbury	3	6	[10]
(Colombia) N Barrientos (Uruguay) A Behar	6	2	[4]
(France) N Mahut (Australia) J Peers	4	4
(United Kingdom) J Cash (United Kingdom) H Patten	6	6
4	(Brazil) R Matos (Spain) D Vega Hernández	6	2	[1]
(United States) N Lammons (United States) J Withrow	4	6	[10]
(Colombia) R Farah (Brazil) M Melo	1	3
(France) G Barrère (France) Q Halys	6	6
(Spain) R Carballés Baena (Spain) P Martínez	6	3	[11]
(United States) R Galloway (Mexico) MÁ Reyes-Varela	2	6	[9]
Alt	(Greece) M Pervolarakis (United States) Nathan Ponwith	3	6^{4}
3	(Germany) K Krawietz (France) F Martin	6	7^{7}
WC	(Mexico) H Hach Verdugo (United States) D Kudla	7	6
WC	(United States) A Lawson (United States) H Reese	5	3
(Australia) R Hijikata (Australia) L Saville	2	4
2	(Monaco) H Nys (Poland) J Zieliński	6	6

Quarterfinals
1	(United States) R Ram (United Kingdom) J Salisbury	3	2
(United Kingdom) J Cash (United Kingdom) H Patten	6	6
(United States) N Lammons (United States) J Withrow	6	6
(France) G Barrère (France) Q Halys	2	1
(Spain) R Carballés Baena (Spain) P Martínez	7^{7}	6
3	(Germany) K Krawietz (France) F Martin	6^{4}	3
WC	(Mexico) H Hach Verdugo (United States) D Kudla	0	6	[8]
2	(Monaco) H Nys (Poland) J Zieliński	6	4	[10]

Semifinals
(United Kingdom) J Cash (United Kingdom) H Patten	7^{9}	4	[4]
(United States) N Lammons (United States) J Withrow	6^{7}	6	[10]
(Spain) R Carballés Baena (Spain) P Martínez	4	2
2	(Monaco) H Nys (Poland) J Zieliński	6	6

Final
(United States) N Lammons (United States) J Withrow	6^{1}	6	[10]
2	(Monaco) H Nys (Poland) J Zieliński	7^{7}	4	[8]
