= 2020 Arizona Tennis Classic =

- Date: 16–22 March
- Edition: 2nd
- Draw: 56S / 8Q / 16D
- Surface: Hard
- Location: Phoenix, Arizona, United States

Champions

Singles
- no champion

Doubles
- no champions
← 2019 ·	Arizona Tennis Classic	· 2022 →

The 2020 Arizona Tennis Classic was a professional tennis tournament played on hard courts. It would be the second edition of the tournament which was part of the 2020 ATP Challenger Tour. It was scheduled to take place in Phoenix, Arizona, United States between 16 and 22 March 2020. The tournament was canceled due to the COVID-19 pandemic.
