= 2023 Arizona Tennis Classic =

- Date: 13–19 March
- Edition: 3rd
- Surface: Hard
- Location: Phoenix, United States

Champions

Singles
- (Portugal) Nuno Borges

Doubles
- (United States) Nathaniel Lammons / (United States) Jackson Withrow
| ← 2022 · | Arizona Tennis Classic | · 2024 → |

The 2023 Arizona Tennis Classic was a professional tennis tournament played on hardcourts. It was the tournament's third edition, which was part of the 2023 ATP Challenger Tour. It occurred in Phoenix, United States, between March 13 and March 19, 2023 and was listed as an ATP Challenger Tour 175 for the first year.

== Singles main draw entrants ==
=== Seeds ===
| Country | Player | Rank^{1} | Seed |
|---|---|---|---|
| ITA | Matteo Berrettini | 23 | 1 |
| ARG | Diego Schwartzman | 38 | 2 |
| FRA | Richard Gasquet | 43 | 3 |
| KAZ | Alexander Bublik | 46 | 4 |
| CZE | Jiří Lehečka | 47 | 5 |
| SUI | Marc-Andrea Hüsler | 51 | 6 |
| SWE | Mikael Ymer | 57 | 7 |
| FIN | Emil Ruusuvuori | 59 | 8 |

- ^{1} Rankings are as of 6 March 2023.

=== Other entrants ===
The following players received wildcards into the singles main draw:

- (Italy) Matteo Berrettini
- (France) Gaël Monfils
- (Argentina) Diego Schwartzman

The following players received entry into the singles main draw as alternates:

- (Moldova) Radu Albot
- (Italy) Matteo Arnaldi
- (Portugal) Nuno Borges
- (Australia) Thanasi Kokkinakis
- (United States) Denis Kudla
- (Australia) Christopher O'Connell
- Roman Safiullin
- (China) Zhang Zhizhen

The following players received entry from the qualifying draw:

- Pavel Kotov
- (United States) Aleksandar Kovacevic
- (United States) Emilio Nava
- Alexander Shevchenko
- (Germany) Jan-Lennard Struff
- (Australia) Aleksandar Vukic

The following players received entry as lucky losers:

- (Italy) Mattia Bellucci
- (Australia) Rinky Hijikata

== Champions ==
=== Singles ===
- (Portugal) Nuno Borges def. Alexander Shevchenko 4–6, 6–2, 6–1.

=== Doubles ===
- (United States) Nathaniel Lammons / (United States) Jackson Withrow def. (Monaco) Hugo Nys / (Poland) Jan Zieliński 6–7^{(1–7)}, 6–4, [10–8].
