= 2026 Arizona Tennis Classic – Doubles =

Doubles
- 2026 Arizona Tennis Classic

Final
- Champions: (Ecuador) Diego Hidalgo (United States) Patrik Trhac
- Runners-up: (Monaco) Hugo Nys (France) Édouard Roger-Vasselin
- Score: 6–7^{(6–8)}, 6–3, [10–4]

Events
Singles	Doubles
- Arizona Tennis Classic

Marcel Granollers and Horacio Zeballos were the defending champions but chose not to defend their title.

Diego Hidalgo and Patrik Trhac won the title after defeating Hugo Nys and Édouard Roger-Vasselin 6–7^{(6–8)}, 6–3, [10–4] in the final.

== Seeds ==
1. (Monaco) Hugo Nys / (France) Édouard Roger-Vasselin (final)
2. (United Kingdom) Luke Johnson / (Poland) Jan Zieliński (semifinals)
3. (France) Théo Arribagé / (France) Albano Olivetti (first round)
4. (United States) Austin Krajicek / (Croatia) Nikola Mektić (first round)

== Draw ==
Key

- Q = Qualifier
- WC = Wild card
- LL = Lucky loser
- Alt = Alternate
- ITF = ITF entry
- PR = Protected ranking
- SR = Special ranking
- SE = Special exempt
- JE = Junior exempt
- JR = Junior Accelerator Programme entrant
- CO = College Accelerator Programme entrant
- NG = Next Gen Accelerator Program entrant
- w/o = Walkover
- r = Retired
- d = Defaulted

First round
1	(Monaco) H Nys (France) É Roger-Vasselin	6	6^{7}	[10]
WC	(United States) N Lammons (United States) J Withrow	4	7^{9}	[5]
(Chinese Taipei) R Ho (United Kingdom) M Willis	4	6	[7]
(United States) R Cash (United States) JJ Tracy	6	4	[10]
4	(United States) A Krajicek (Croatia) N Mektić	3	4
(Australia) M Polmans (United States) R Seggerman	6	6
(United States) M Kiger (United States) R Stalder	6	7^{15}
(United States) R Galloway (United States) T Winegar	4	6^{13}
(Ecuador) D Hidalgo (United States) P Trhac	7^{8}	6
(India) A Chandrasekar (Japan) T Yuzuki	6^{6}	4
(Brazil) F Romboli (Australia) J-P Smith	6	4	[10]
3	(France) T Arribagé (France) A Olivetti	3	6	[8]
(Colombia) N Barrientos (United States) B Kittay	7	6
WC	(United States) G Goldhoff (United States) S Papa	5	3
Alt	(Republic of Ireland) C Barry (United States) A Martin	6^{2}	2
2	(United Kingdom) L Johnson (Poland) J Zieliński	7^{7}	6

Quarterfinals
1	(Monaco) H Nys (France) É Roger-Vasselin	3	6	[10]
(United States) R Cash (United States) JJ Tracy	6	3	[8]
(Australia) M Polmans (United States) R Seggerman	6	7^{7}
(United States) M Kiger (United States) R Stalder	4	6^{3}
(Ecuador) D Hidalgo (United States) P Trhac	6	6
(Brazil) F Romboli (Australia) J-P Smith	3	2
(Colombia) N Barrientos (United States) B Kittay	4	6	[6]
2	(United Kingdom) L Johnson (Poland) J Zieliński	6	2	[10]

Semifinals
1	(Monaco) H Nys (France) É Roger-Vasselin	6	7^{7}
(Australia) M Polmans (United States) R Seggerman	2	6^{1}
(Ecuador) D Hidalgo (United States) P Trhac	7	6
2	(United Kingdom) L Johnson (Poland) J Zieliński	5	4

Final
1	(Monaco) H Nys (France) É Roger-Vasselin	7^{8}	3	[4]
(Ecuador) D Hidalgo (United States) P Trhac	6^{6}	6	[10]
