= 2024 Arizona Tennis Classic =

- Date: 12–17 March
- Edition: 4th
- Surface: Hard
- Location: Phoenix, United States

Champions

Singles
- (Portugal) Nuno Borges

Doubles
- (France) Sadio Doumbia / (France) Fabien Reboul
← 2023 ·	Arizona Tennis Classic	· 2025 →

The 2024 Arizona Tennis Classic was a professional tennis tournament played on hardcourts. It was the fourth edition of the tournament, which was part of the 2024 ATP Challenger Tour. It took place in Phoenix, United States, between 12 March and 17 March 2024 and was listed as an ATP Challenger Tour 175 for a second year.

== Singles main draw entrants ==
=== Seeds ===
Country	Player	Rank^{1}	Seed
USA	Christopher Eubanks	34	1
AUT	Sebastian Ofner	38	2
	Roman Safiullin	42	3
GER	Yannick Hanfmann	57	4
POR	Nuno Borges	60	5
ESP	Roberto Carballés Baena	64	6
AUS	Aleksandar Vukic	69	7
FRA	Arthur Cazaux	77	8

- ^{1} Rankings are as of March 4, 2024.

=== Other entrants ===
The following players received wildcards into the singles main draw:

- (Italy) Matteo Berrettini
- (United States) Denis Kudla
- (United States) Michael Mmoh

The following players received entry into the singles main draw as alternates:

- (France) Arthur Cazaux
- (Italy) Fabio Fognini
- (France) Quentin Halys
- (Australia) Thanasi Kokkinakis
- (France) Constant Lestienne
- (Germany) ~~Maximilian Marterer~~
- (Serbia) Hamad Medjedovic
- (France) Benoît Paire
- (France) Arthur Rinderknech
- (Austria) Jurij Rodionov
- (United States) J. J. Wolf

The following players received entry from the qualifying draw:

- (France) Térence Atmane
- (Chile) Cristian Garín
- (United States) Mitchell Krueger
- (United States) Emilio Nava
- (United States) Zachary Svajda
- (Australia) Adam Walton

The following player received entry as a lucky loser:

- (Czech Republic) Vít Kopřiva

== Champions ==
=== Singles ===
- (Portugal) Nuno Borges def. (Italy) Matteo Berrettini 7–5, 7–6^{(7–4)}.

=== Doubles ===
- (France) Sadio Doumbia / (France) Fabien Reboul def. (Australia) Rinky Hijikata / (United Kingdom) Henry Patten 6–3, 6–2.
