= 2026 Arizona Tennis Classic – Singles =

Singles
- 2026 Arizona Tennis Classic

Final
- Champion: (United States) Ethan Quinn
- Runner-up: (United States) Marcos Giron
- Score: 7–6^{(7–1)}, 4–6, 7–5

Events
Singles	Doubles
- Arizona Tennis Classic

João Fonseca was the defending champion but was unable to defend his title as he was still competing in Indian Wells.

Ethan Quinn won the title after defeating Marcos Giron 7–6^{(7–1)}, 4–6, 7–5 in the final.

== Seeds ==
The top four seeds received a bye into the second round.

1. (France) Corentin Moutet (semifinals)
2. (Belgium) Zizou Bergs (withdrew)
3. (France) Adrian Mannarino (quarterfinals)
4. (Portugal) Nuno Borges (quarterfinals)
5. (France) Térence Atmane (first round)
6. (Poland) Kamil Majchrzak (first round)
7. (United States) Marcos Giron (final)
8. (United States) Ethan Quinn (champion)

== Draw ==
Key

- Q = Qualifier
- WC = Wild card
- LL = Lucky loser
- Alt = Alternate
- ITF = ITF entry
- PR = Protected ranking
- SR = Special ranking
- SE = Special exempt
- JE = Junior exempt
- JR = Junior Accelerator Programme entrant
- CO = College Accelerator Programme entrant
- NG = Next Gen Accelerator Program entrant
- w/o = Walkover
- r = Retired
- d = Defaulted

=== Finals ===
Semifinals
1	(France) Corentin Moutet	6	3	4
7	(United States) Marcos Giron	4	6	6
Alt	(United Kingdom) Billy Harris	6^{6}	6^{5}
8	(United States) Ethan Quinn	7^{8}	7^{7}

Final
7	(United States) Marcos Giron	6^{1}	6	5
8	(United States) Ethan Quinn	7^{7}	4	7

=== Top half ===
First round
Q	(Italy) S Travaglia	6	6^{3}	6^{5}
(France) Q Halys	4	7^{7}	7^{7}
(United Kingdom) J Fearnley	2	6	1
(France) A Cazaux	6	3	6
Alt	(Georgia (country)) N Basilashvili	7^{7}	6
6	(Poland) K Majchrzak	6^{3}	3
(Australia) J Duckworth	6^{3}	6	6
(Germany) J-L Struff	7^{7}	4	4
Q	(Japan) J Friend	6	4	6
Q	(United States) S Kozlov	2	6	3
Alt	(Spain) D Mérida	0	1
7	(United States) M Giron	6	6

Second round
1	(France) C Moutet	6	6
(France) Q Halys	4	4
(France) A Cazaux
Alt	(Georgia (country)) N Basilashvili	w/o
4	(Portugal) N Borges	3	6	6
(Australia) J Duckworth	6	4	2
Q	(Japan) J Friend	5	6	6^{9}
7	(United States) M Giron	7	4	7^{11}

Quarterfinals
1	(France) C Moutet	7^{7}	6
Alt	(Georgia (country)) N Basilashvili	6^{5}	4
4	(Portugal) N Borges	6^{8}	2
7	(United States) M Giron	7^{10}	6

Semifinals
1	(France) C Moutet	6	3	4
7	(United States) M Giron	4	6	6

=== Bottom half ===
First round
5	(France) T Atmane	4	4
WC	(United States) Dar Blanch	6	6
(Australia) A Vukic	6^{6}	6^{3}
Alt	(United Kingdom) B Harris	7^{8}	7^{7}
WC	(United States) M Krueger	6^{5}	7	4
Q	(Jamaica) B Bicknell	7^{7}	5	6
8	(United States) E Quinn	6^{4}	6	6
(Kazakhstan) A Shevchenko	7^{7}	4	2
(United States) E Nava	2	6^{3}
WC	(United States) M Mmoh	6	7^{7}
Alt	(France) B Bonzi	3	6	7^{7}
Alt	(Australia) A Bolt	6	3	6^{4}

Second round
WC	(United States) Dar Blanch	6	6^{5}	6^{6}
Alt	(United Kingdom) B Harris	3	7^{7}	7^{8}
Q	(Jamaica) B Bicknell	7^{7}	2	2
3	(France) A Mannarino	6^{2}	6	6
8	(United States) E Quinn	6	6
WC	(United States) M Mmoh	1	3
Alt	(France) B Bonzi	6	6
LL	(Switzerland) L Riedi	3	3

Quarterfinals
Alt	(United Kingdom) B Harris	6	6^{4}	6
3	(France) A Mannarino	4	7^{7}	4
8	(United States) E Quinn	7^{7}	7^{9}
Alt	(France) B Bonzi	6^{4}	6^{7}

Semifinals
Alt	(United Kingdom) B Harris	6^{6}	6^{5}
8	(United States) E Quinn	7^{8}	7^{7}
