= 2022 Arizona Tennis Classic – Singles =

Singles
- 2022 Arizona Tennis Classic

Final
- Champion: (United States) Denis Kudla
- Runner-up: (Germany) Daniel Altmaier
- Score: 2–6, 6–2, 6–3

Events
| Singles | Doubles |
| ← 2019 · | Arizona Tennis Classic | · 2023 → |

Denis Kudla defeated Daniel Altmaier in the final, 2–6, 6–2, 6–3, to win the singles tennis title at the 2022 Arizona Tennis Classic. It marked Kudla's eighth career ATP Challenger title.

Matteo Berrettini was the defending champion, but did not return to defend his title.

== Seeds ==
1. (France) Benoît Paire (second round)
2. (Italy) Lorenzo Musetti (second round)
3. (France) Arthur Rinderknech (second round)
4. (Germany) Jan-Lennard Struff (first round)
5. (Argentina) Sebastián Báez (first round)
6. (France) Hugo Gaston (first round)
7. (Finland) Emil Ruusuvuori (second round)
8. (Belgium) David Goffin (quarterfinals)

== Draw ==
=== Key ===
- Q = Qualifier
- WC = Wild card
- LL = Lucky loser
- Alt = Alternate
- SE = Special exempt
- PR = Protected ranking
- ITF = ITF entry
- JE = Junior exempt
- w/o = Walkover
- r = Retired
- d = Defaulted
- SR = Special ranking

=== Finals ===
Semifinals
Alt | (Germany) Daniel Altmaier | 7^{7} | 7
Alt | (United Kingdom) Liam Broady | 6^{5} | 5
Alt | (United States) Denis Kudla | 6^{3} | 6 | 7^{7}
WC | (United States) J. J. Wolf | 7^{7} | 4 | 6^{3}

Final
Alt | (Germany) Daniel Altmaier | 6 | 2 | 3
Alt | (United States) Denis Kudla | 2 | 6 | 6

=== Top half ===
First round
1 | (France) B Paire | 7 | 6
Q | (United States) Em Nava | 5 | 2
Alt | (Germany) O Otte | 6 | 4 | 3
Alt | (Moldova) R Albot | 4 | 6 | 6
Alt | (Australia) A Vukic | 1 | 6 | 4
Alt | (Germany) D Altmaier | 6 | 3 | 6
WC | (United States) B Nakashima | 3 | 3
7 | (Finland) E Ruusuvuori | 6 | 6
3 | (France) A Rinderknech | 1 | 6 | 6
(Argentina) F Cerúndolo | 6 | 3 | 2
(Argentina) JM Cerúndolo | 1 | 2
Alt | (United Kingdom) L Broady | 6 | 6
Q | (France) G Simon | 4 | 5
WC | (United States) C Eubanks | 6 | 7
Q | (United States) A Kovacevic | 6 | 3 | 3
8 | (Belgium) D Goffin | 1 | 6 | 6

Second round
1 | (France) B Paire | 2 | 6 | 5
Alt | (Moldova) R Albot | 6 | 4 | 7
Alt | (Germany) D Altmaier | 6 | 7
7 | (Finland) E Ruusuvuori | 2 | 5
3 | (France) A Rinderknech | 3 | 2
Alt | (United Kingdom) L Broady | 6 | 6
WC | (United States) C Eubanks | 6^{2} | 6 | 4
8 | (Belgium) D Goffin | 7^{7} | 3 | 6

Quarterfinals
Alt | (Moldova) R Albot | 4 | 5
Alt | (Germany) D Altmaier | 6 | 7
Alt | (United Kingdom) L Broady | 2 | 6 | 7
8 | (Belgium) D Goffin | 6 | 3 | 5

Semifinals
Alt | (Germany) D Altmaier | 7^{7} | 7
Alt | (United Kingdom) L Broady | 6^{5} | 5

=== Bottom half ===
First round
5 | (Argentina) S Báez | 6 | 3 | 4
(Argentina) F Bagnis | 2 | 6 | 6
Q | (Kazakhstan) M Kukushkin | 7^{7} | 1 | 1
(France) R Gasquet | 6^{5} | 6 | 6
Q | (United States) M Krueger | 1 | 5
Alt | (United States) D Kudla | 6 | 7
LL | (Germany) M Moraing | 3 | 7^{7} | 6
4 | (Germany) J-L Struff | 6 | 6^{2} | 4
6 | (France) H Gaston | 7^{7} | 4 | 4
(Poland) K Majchrzak | 6^{3} | 6 | 6
Alt | (Italy) M Cecchinato | 4 | 7^{7} | 3
PR | (Spain) F Verdasco | 6 | 6^{5} | 6
WC | (United States) J. J. Wolf | 6 | 6
Q | (Australia) M Purcell | 1 | 3
(Australia) A Popyrin | 2 | 2
2 | (Italy) L Musetti | 6 | 6

Second round
(Argentina) F Bagnis | 2 | 0
(France) R Gasquet | 6 | 6
Alt | (United States) D Kudla | 7^{7} | 7^{7}
LL | (Germany) M Moraing | 6^{2} | 6^{5}
(Poland) K Majchrzak | 6 | 4 | 6^{5}
PR | (Spain) F Verdasco | 2 | 6 | 7^{7}
WC | (United States) J. J. Wolf | 6 | 6
2 | (Italy) L Musetti | 3 | 2

Quarterfinals
(France) R Gasquet | 3 | 4
Alt | (United States) D Kudla | 6 | 6
PR | (Spain) F Verdasco | 5 | 4
WC | (United States) J. J. Wolf | 7 | 6

Semifinals
Alt | (United States) D Kudla | 6^{3} | 6 | 7^{7}
WC | (United States) J. J. Wolf | 7^{7} | 4 | 6^{3}
