= 2025 Arizona Tennis Classic =

- Date: 11–16 March
- Edition: 5th
- Surface: Hard
- Location: Phoenix, United States

Champions

Singles
- (Brazil) João Fonseca

Doubles
- (Spain) Marcel Granollers / (Argentina) Horacio Zeballos
← 2024 ·	Arizona Tennis Classic	· 2026 →

The 2025 Arizona Tennis Classic was a professional tennis tournament played on hardcourts. It was the fifth edition of the tournament, which was part of the 2025 ATP Challenger Tour. It took place in Phoenix, United States, between 11 and 16 March 2025.

== Singles main draw entrants ==
=== Seeds ===
Country	Player	Rank^{1}	Seed
POR	Nuno Borges	36	1
ITA	Flavio Cobolli	40	2
ESP	Pedro Martínez	41	3
GER	Jan-Lennard Struff	46	4
AUS	Aleksandar Vukic	64	5
ITA	Luca Nardi	67	6
	Roman Safiullin	69	7
FRA	Arthur Rinderknech	73	8

- ^{1} Rankings are as of March 3, 2025.

=== Other entrants ===
The following players received wildcards into the singles main draw:

- (United States) Brandon Holt
- (United States) Colton Smith
- (United States) Eliot Spizzirri

The following players received entry into the singles main draw as alternates:

- (United States) Christopher Eubanks
- (United States) Reilly Opelka
- (Kazakhstan) Alexander Shevchenko

The following players received entry from the qualifying draw:

- (Georgia (country)) Nikoloz Basilashvili
- (Kazakhstan) Mikhail Kukushkin
- (Australia) Li Tu
- (Japan) Yasutaka Uchiyama

== Champions ==
=== Singles ===
- (Brazil) João Fonseca def. (Kazakhstan) Alexander Bublik 7–6^{(7–5)}, 7–6^{(7–0)}.

=== Doubles ===
- (Spain) Marcel Granollers / (Argentina) Horacio Zeballos def. (United States) Austin Krajicek / (United States) Rajeev Ram 6–3, 7–6^{(7–2)}.
