= 2023 Arizona Tennis Classic – Singles =

Singles
- 2023 Arizona Tennis Classic

Final
- Champion: (Portugal) Nuno Borges
- Runner-up: Alexander Shevchenko
- Score: 4–6, 6–2, 6–1

Events
Singles	Doubles
← 2022 ·	Arizona Tennis Classic	· 2024 →

Denis Kudla was the defending champion but lost in the first round to Alexander Bublik.

Nuno Borges won the title after defeating Alexander Shevchenko 4–6, 6–2, 6–1 in the final.

== Seeds ==
1. (Italy) Matteo Berrettini (quarterfinals)
2. (Argentina) Diego Schwartzman (first round)
3. (France) Richard Gasquet (second round)
4. (Kazakhstan) Alexander Bublik (quarterfinals)
5. (Czech Republic) Jiří Lehečka (first round)
6. (Switzerland) Marc-Andrea Hüsler (second round)
7. (Sweden) Mikael Ymer (second round)
8. (Finland) Emil Ruusuvuori (second round)

== Draw ==
=== Key ===
- Q = Qualifier
- WC = Wild card
- LL = Lucky loser
- Alt = Alternate
- SE = Special exempt
- PR = Protected ranking
- ITF = ITF entry
- JE = Junior exempt
- w/o = Walkover
- r = Retired
- d = Defaulted
- SR = Special ranking

=== Finals ===
Semifinals
Q	Alexander Shevchenko	6^{3}	6	6
(France) Quentin Halys	7^{7}	4	3
Q	(Germany) Jan-Lennard Struff	4	2
Alt	(Portugal) Nuno Borges	6	6

Final
Q	Alexander Shevchenko	6	2	1
Alt	(Portugal) Nuno Borges	4	6	6

=== Top half ===
First round
1/WC	(Italy) M Berrettini	6	6
LL	(Italy) M Bellucci	4	4
Alt	(Italy) M Arnaldi	2	6	3
Q	(Australia) A Vukic	6	4	6
Q	A Shevchenko	6	6^{2}	6
WC	(France) G Monfils	4	7^{7}	3
(Serbia) F Krajinović	6^{5}	0^{r}
6	(Switzerland) M-A Hüsler	7^{7}	2
3	(France) R Gasquet	7^{7}	6
Q	(United States) E Nava	6^{5}	3
Alt	(Australia) C O'Connell	3	6	6^{6}
Q	(United States) A Kovacevic	6	3	7^{8}
(France) Q Halys	6	6
(France) G Barrère	3	1
(Spain) R Carballés Baena	3	0
8	(Finland) E Ruusuvuori	6	6

Second round
1/WC	(Italy) M Berrettini	7	7^{7}
Q	(Australia) A Vukic	5	6^{5}
Q	A Shevchenko	7	6
6	(Switzerland) M-A Hüsler	5	1
3	(France) R Gasquet	2	6	4
Q	(United States) A Kovacevic	6	3	6
(France) Q Halys	3	6	6
8	(Finland) E Ruusuvuori	6	3	4

Quarterfinals
1/WC	(Italy) M Berrettini	4	6	3
Q	A Shevchenko	6	3	6
Q	(United States) A Kovacevic	6	3	2
(France) Q Halys	1	6	6

Semifinals
Q	A Shevchenko	6^{3}	6	6
(France) Q Halys	7^{7}	4	3

=== Bottom half ===
First round
5	(Czech Republic) J Lehečka	6^{5}	4
Alt	(Australia) T Kokkinakis	7^{7}	6
Q	P Kotov	2	4
Q	(Germany) J-L Struff	6	6
Alt	(China) Z Zhang	6^{4}	6	6
LL	(Australia) R Hijikata	7^{7}	3	4
Alt	(United States) D Kudla	6^{9}	6	2
4	(Kazakhstan) A Bublik	7^{11}	4	6
7	(Sweden) M Ymer	6	7
Alt	(Moldova) R Albot	1	5
(Germany) O Otte	4	3
(Australia) A Popyrin	6	6
Alt	R Safiullin	6	6
(Spain) P Martínez	3	2
Alt	(Portugal) N Borges	7	6
2/WC	(Argentina) D Schwartzman	5	3

Second round
Alt	(Australia) T Kokkinakis	3	3
Q	(Germany) J-L Struff	6	6
Alt	(China) Z Zhang	1	2
4	(Kazakhstan) A Bublik	6	6
7	(Sweden) M Ymer	2	2
(Australia) A Popyrin	6	6
Alt	R Safiullin	5	4
Alt	(Portugal) N Borges	7	6

Quarterfinals
Q	(Germany) J-L Struff	6	3	6
4	(Kazakhstan) A Bublik	4	6	4
(Australia) A Popyrin	5	7^{7}	3
Alt	(Portugal) N Borges	7	6^{4}	6

Semifinals
Q	(Germany) J-L Struff	4	2
Alt	(Portugal) N Borges	6	6
