= 2023 US Open – Men's singles =

Tennis championship

Men's singles
- 2023 US Open

Final
- Champion: (Serbia) Novak Djokovic
- Runner-up: Daniil Medvedev
- Score: 6–3, 7–6^{(7–5)}, 6–3

Details
- Draw: 128 (16Q / 8WC)
- Seeds: 32

Events
Singles	men	women		boys	girls
Doubles	men	women	mixed	boys	girls
WC Singles	men	women	quad	boys	girls
WC Doubles	men	women	quad	boys	girls
- US Open

Novak Djokovic defeated Daniil Medvedev in the final, 6–3, 7–6^{(7–5)}, 6–3 to win the men's singles tennis title at the 2023 US Open. It was his fourth US Open title and record-extending 24th men's singles major title overall. Djokovic was the oldest US Open men's singles champion in the Open Era, at 36 years, 3 months and 19 days old. By reaching a 47th men's singles major semifinal, he surpassed Roger Federer's all-time record, and by reaching the final, he equaled Federer's record of reaching all four major finals in a season three times. The final was a rematch of the 2021 final, won by Medvedev. By winning his first-round match, Djokovic regained the world No. 1 singles ranking from Carlos Alcaraz.

Alcaraz was the defending champion, but lost in the semifinals to Medvedev.

This tournament marked the last US Open appearance of 2012 champion, three-time major champion, two-time Olympic gold medalist, and former world No. 1 Andy Murray; he lost in the second round to Grigor Dimitrov. Murray's first-round win against Corentin Moutet was his 200th and final major win. It was also the final professional appearance of former world No. 8 and career-ace record-holder John Isner; he lost in the second round to Michael Mmoh.

== Seeds ==
1. (Spain) Carlos Alcaraz (semifinals)
2. (Serbia) Novak Djokovic (champion)
3. Daniil Medvedev (final)
4. (Denmark) Holger Rune (first round)
5. (Norway) Casper Ruud (second round)
6. (Italy) Jannik Sinner (fourth round)
7. (Greece) Stefanos Tsitsipas (second round)
8. Andrey Rublev (quarterfinals)
9. (United States) Taylor Fritz (quarterfinals)
10. (United States) Frances Tiafoe (quarterfinals)
11. Karen Khachanov (first round)
12. (Germany) Alexander Zverev (quarterfinals)
13. (Australia) Alex de Minaur (fourth round)
14. (United States) Tommy Paul (fourth round)
15. (Canada) Félix Auger-Aliassime (first round)
16. (United Kingdom) Cameron Norrie (third round)
17. (Poland) Hubert Hurkacz (second round)
18. (Italy) Lorenzo Musetti (first round)
19. (Bulgaria) Grigor Dimitrov (third round)
20. (Argentina) Francisco Cerúndolo (second round)
21. (Spain) Alejandro Davidovich Fokina (third round)
22. (France) Adrian Mannarino (third round)
23. (Chile) Nicolás Jarry (third round)
24. (Netherlands) Tallon Griekspoor (first round)
25. (Kazakhstan) Alexander Bublik (first round)
26. (United Kingdom) Dan Evans (third round)
27. (Croatia) Borna Ćorić (first round)
28. (United States) Christopher Eubanks (second round)
29. (France) Ugo Humbert (first round)
30. (Argentina) Tomás Martín Etcheverry (second round)
31. (United States) Sebastian Korda (first round)
32. (Serbia) Laslo Djere (third round)

Click on the seed number of a player to go to their draw section.

== Draw ==
Key

- Q = Qualifier
- WC = Wild card
- LL = Lucky loser
- Alt = Alternate
- ITF = ITF entry
- PR = Protected ranking
- SR = Special ranking
- SE = Special exempt
- JE = Junior exempt
- JR = Junior Accelerator Programme entrant
- CO = College Accelerator Programme entrant
- NG = Next Gen Accelerator Program entrant
- w/o = Walkover
- r = Retired
- d = Defaulted

=== Finals ===
Quarterfinals
1	(Spain) Carlos Alcaraz	6	6	6
12	(Germany) Alexander Zverev	3	2	4
3	Daniil Medvedev	6	6	6
8	Andrey Rublev	4	3	4
10	(United States) Frances Tiafoe	2	6	6^{7}	2
(United States) Ben Shelton	6	3	7^{9}	6
9	(United States) Taylor Fritz	1	4	4
2	(Serbia) Novak Djokovic	6	6	6

Semifinals
1	(Spain) Carlos Alcaraz	6^{3}	1	6	3
3	Daniil Medvedev	7^{7}	6	3	6
(United States) Ben Shelton	3	2	6^{4}
2	(Serbia) Novak Djokovic	6	6	7^{7}

Final
3	Daniil Medvedev	3	6^{5}	3
2	(Serbia) Novak Djokovic	6	7^{7}	6

=== Top half ===
==== Section 1 ====
First round
1	(Spain) C Alcaraz	6	3
(Germany) D Koepfer	2	2^{r}
PR	(South Africa) L Harris	7^{7}	6	6
PR	(Argentina) G Pella	6^{5}	4	4
(Netherlands) B van de Zandschulp	6	0
(Australia) J Thompson	3	0^{r}
(Colombia) DE Galán	4	2	5
26	(United Kingdom) D Evans	6	6	7
24	(Netherlands) T Griekspoor	6	3	7	4	5
(France) A Fils	4	6	5	6	7
(Australia) J Kubler	3	0^{r}
(Italy) M Arnaldi	6	1
(Australia) T Kokkinakis	3	4	6	3
Q	(Chinese Taipei) Y-h Hsu	6	6	3	6
A Shevchenko	3	2	2
16	(United Kingdom) C Norrie	6	6	6

Second round
1	(Spain) C Alcaraz	6	6	7^{7}
PR	(South Africa) L Harris	3	1	6^{4}
(Netherlands) B van de Zandschulp	6	1	3	3
26	(United Kingdom) D Evans	1	6	6	6
(France) A Fils	6	5	6^{5}	7	4
(Italy) M Arnaldi	3	7	7^{7}	5	6
Q	(Chinese Taipei) Y-h Hsu	5	4	4
16	(United Kingdom) C Norrie	7	6	6

Third round
1	(Spain) C Alcaraz	6	6	4	6
26	(United Kingdom) D Evans	2	3	6	3
(Italy) M Arnaldi	6	6	6
16	(United Kingdom) C Norrie	3	4	3

Fourth round
1	(Spain) C Alcaraz	6	6	6
(Italy) M Arnaldi	3	3	4

==== Section 2 ====
First round
12	(Germany) A Zverev	6	6	6
(Australia) A Vukic	4	4	4
(Germany) D Altmaier	6^{5}	6	6	6
(France) C Lestienne	7^{7}	3	1	2
(United Kingdom) A Murray	6	7	6
(France) C Moutet	2	5	3
(Slovakia) A Molčan	7^{11}	7^{7}	1	5	6^{9}
19	(Bulgaria) G Dimitrov	6^{9}	6^{5}	6	7	7^{11}
30	(Argentina) TM Etcheverry	6	6^{3}	1	6	7^{10}
Q	(Finland) O Virtanen	3	7^{7}	6	4	6^{5}
(Switzerland) S Wawrinka	7^{7}	6	6
(Japan) Y Nishioka	6^{5}	2	4
Q	(United States) N Moreno de Alboran	3	4	2
(Italy) L Sonego	6	6	6
(Germany) Y Hanfmann	3	1	1
6	(Italy) J Sinner	6	6	6

Second round
12	(Germany) A Zverev	7^{7}	3	6	6
(Germany) D Altmaier	6^{1}	6	4	3
(United Kingdom) A Murray	3	4	1
19	(Bulgaria) G Dimitrov	6	6	6
30	(Argentina) TM Etcheverry	6^{6}	7^{9}	3	2
(Switzerland) S Wawrinka	7^{8}	6^{7}	6	6
(Italy) L Sonego	4	2	4
6	(Italy) J Sinner	6	6	6

Third round
12	(Germany) A Zverev	6^{2}	7^{10}	6	6
19	(Bulgaria) G Dimitrov	7^{7}	6^{8}	1	1
(Switzerland) S Wawrinka	3	6	4	2
6	(Italy) J Sinner	6	2	6	6

Fourth round
12	(Germany) A Zverev	6	3	6	4	6
6	(Italy) J Sinner	4	6	2	6	3

==== Section 3 ====
First round
3	D Medvedev	6	6	6
PR	(Hungary) A Balázs	1	1	0
(Australia) M Purcell	4	3	6	6^{5}
(Australia) C O'Connell	6	6	3	7^{7}
LL	(Australia) J Duckworth	4	6^{11}	3
Q	(Brazil) F Meligeni Alves	6	7^{13}	6
(Argentina) S Báez	7	7	6
27	(Croatia) B Ćorić	5	5	1
23	(Chile) N Jarry	6	3	6	7^{7}
(France) L Van Assche	3	6	2	6^{3}
(Spain) A Ramos Viñolas	4	3	4
WC	(United States) A Michelsen	6	6	6
(China) Y Wu	3	6	2	6	6
(Serbia) D Lajović	6	4	6	4	2
Q	(Kazakhstan) T Skatov	2	6	1	5
13	(Australia) A de Minaur	6	3	6	7

Second round
3	D Medvedev	6	6	6^{6}	6
(Australia) C O'Connell	2	2	7^{8}	2
Q	(Brazil) F Meligeni Alves	7^{9}	4	4	0^{r}
(Argentina) S Báez	6^{7}	6	6	0
23	(Chile) N Jarry	4	6	6	6
WC	(United States) A Michelsen	6	3	3	3
(China) Y Wu	1	2	1
13	(Australia) A de Minaur	6	6	6

Third round
3	D Medvedev	6	6	7^{8}
(Argentina) S Báez	2	2	6^{6}
23	(Chile) N Jarry	1	3	2
13	(Australia) A de Minaur	6	6	6

Fourth round
3	D Medvedev	2	6	6	6
13	(Australia) A de Minaur	6	4	1	2

==== Section 4 ====
First round
11	K Khachanov	2	4	2
WC	(United States) M Mmoh	6	6	6
(Argentina) F Díaz Acosta	4	3	6^{1}
WC	(United States) J Isner	6	6	7^{7}
(Moldova) R Albot	1	4	3
(United Kingdom) J Draper	6	6	6
(Switzerland) M-A Hüsler	6	7	6^{0}	3	1
17	(Poland) H Hurkacz	4	5	7^{7}	6	6
29	(France) U Humbert	4	2	2
(Italy) M Berrettini	6	6	6
(Argentina) D Schwartzman	3	4	2
(France) A Rinderknech	6	6	6
Q	(Japan) T Daniel	6	4	2	6^{4}
PR	(France) G Monfils	4	6	6	7^{7}
LL	(France) A Cazaux	4	6^{5}	1
8	A Rublev	6	7^{7}	6

Second round
WC	(United States) M Mmoh	3	4	7^{7}	6	7^{10}
WC	(United States) J Isner	6	6	6^{3}	4	6^{7}
(United Kingdom) J Draper	6	6	7
17	(Poland) H Hurkacz	2	4	5
(Italy) M Berrettini	4	3^{r}
(France) A Rinderknech	6	5
PR	(France) G Monfils	4	3	6	1
8	A Rublev	6	6	3	6

Third round
WC	(United States) M Mmoh	4	2	6	3
(United Kingdom) J Draper	6	6	3	6
(France) A Rinderknech	6	3	1	5
8	A Rublev	3	6	6	7

Fourth round
(United Kingdom) J Draper	3	6	3	4
8	A Rublev	6	3	6	6

=== Bottom half ===
==== Section 5 ====
First round
5	(Norway) C Ruud	7^{7}	3	6	7^{7}
Q	(United States) E Nava	6^{5}	6	4	6^{5}
(United States) JJ Wolf	5	5	7^{7}	6	3
(China) Z Zhang	7	7	6^{5}	4	6
WC	(Australia) R Hijikata	7	5	6	7
P Kotov	5	7	3	5
(Hungary) M Fucsovics	7^{7}	4	7^{7}	4	6
31	(United States) S Korda	6^{4}	6	6^{1}	6	4
22	(France) A Mannarino	7	6^{3}	6	7
(Japan) Y Watanuki	5	7^{7}	3	5
(France) R Gasquet	3	1	7^{7}	7^{7}	2
(Hungary) F Marozsán	6	6	6^{5}	6^{1}	6
(Austria) S Ofner	7^{7}	3	7^{9}	6
(Portugal) N Borges	6^{5}	6	6^{7}	4
WC	(United States) L Tien	2	5	1
10	(United States) F Tiafoe	6	7	6

Second round
5	(Norway) C Ruud	4	7	2	6	2
(China) Z Zhang	6	5	6	0	6
WC	(Australia) R Hijikata	6	6	6
(Hungary) M Fucsovics	1	2	1
22	(France) A Mannarino	3	6	6	6
(Hungary) F Marozsán	6	3	4	1
(Austria) S Ofner	3	1	4
10	(United States) F Tiafoe	6	6	6

Third round
(China) Z Zhang	3	3	6	3
WC	(Australia) R Hijikata	6	6	4	6
22	(France) A Mannarino	6	2	3	6^{6}
10	(United States) F Tiafoe	4	6	6	7^{8}

Fourth round
WC	(Australia) R Hijikata	4	1	4
10	(United States) F Tiafoe	6	6	6

==== Section 6 ====
First round
14	(United States) T Paul	6	6	4	6
Q	(Italy) S Travaglia	2	3	6	1
R Safiullin	6	6	6
(Italy) M Cecchinato	4	2	0
I Ivashka	6	7^{7}	3	3	3
(Argentina) JM Cerúndolo	2	6^{4}	6	6	6
(United States) M Giron	4	4	2
21	(Spain) A Davidovich Fokina	6	6	6
25	(Kazakhstan) A Bublik	3	2	4
(Austria) D Thiem	6	6	6
(Argentina) P Cachin	6	3	2	4
(United States) B Shelton	1	6	6	6
A Karatsev	6	6	6
(Czech Republic) J Lehečka	3	3	3
(Spain) R Carballés Baena	6	4	6	6
4	(Denmark) H Rune	3	6	3	2

Second round
14	(United States) T Paul	3	2	6	6	6
R Safiullin	6	6	2	4	3
(Argentina) JM Cerúndolo	1	4	3
21	(Spain) A Davidovich Fokina	6	6	6
(Austria) D Thiem	6^{1}	0^{r}
(United States) B Shelton	7^{7}	1
A Karatsev	6	4	6	7^{7}
(Spain) R Carballés Baena	2	6	3	6^{4}

Third round
14	(United States) T Paul	6	6	3	6
21	(Spain) A Davidovich Fokina	1	0	6	3
(United States) B Shelton	6	3	6	6
A Karatsev	4	6	2	0

Fourth round
14	(United States) T Paul	4	3	6	4
(United States) B Shelton	6	6	4	6

==== Section 7 ====
First round
7	(Greece) S Tsitsipas	6	6	6
PR	(Canada) M Raonic	2	3	4
Q	(Switzerland) D Stricker	6	6	3	6
(Australia) A Popyrin	3	4	6	3
(France) Q Halys	7	4	4	4
WC	(France) B Bonzi	5	6	6	6
(South Korea) S-w Kwon	3	4	6	4
28	(United States) C Eubanks	6	6	0	6
18	(Italy) L Musetti	3	6	7^{7}	3	2
Q	(France) T Droguet	6	0	6^{5}	6	6
Q	(Czech Republic) J Menšík	6	4	7^{7}	6
(France) G Barrère	4	6	6^{1}	2
(Serbia) M Kecmanović	6	5	5	4
(Peru) JP Varillas	1	7	7	6
WC	(United States) S Johnson	2	1	2
9	(United States) T Fritz	6	6	6

Second round
7	(Greece) S Tsitsipas	5	7^{7}	7^{7}	6^{6}	3
Q	(Switzerland) D Stricker	7	6^{2}	6^{5}	7^{8}	6
WC	(France) B Bonzi	7^{8}	2	6	7^{9}
28	(United States) C Eubanks	6^{6}	6	2	6^{7}
Q	(France) T Droguet	6	2	6^{1}	3
Q	(Czech Republic) J Menšík	3	6	7^{7}	6
(Peru) JP Varillas	1	2	2
9	(United States) T Fritz	6	6	6

Third round
Q	(Switzerland) D Stricker	2	7	7^{7}	3	6
WC	(France) B Bonzi	6	5	6^{4}	6	2
Q	(Czech Republic) J Menšík	1	2	0
9	(United States) T Fritz	6	6	6

Fourth round
Q	(Switzerland) D Stricker	6^{2}	4	4
9	(United States) T Fritz	7^{7}	6	6

==== Section 8 ====
First round
15	(Canada) F Auger-Aliassime	6^{5}	6	1	4
(United States) M McDonald	7^{7}	4	6	6
PR	(Bolivia) H Dellien	3	3	1
Q	(Croatia) B Gojo	6	6	6
PR	(Czech Republic) J Veselý	5	6	6	3	6
Q	(France) E Couacaud	7	3	2	6	4
Q	(United States) Z Svajda	7	4	4	3
20	(Argentina) F Cerúndolo	5	6	6	6
32	(Serbia) L Djere	7	6	6
(United States) B Nakashima	5	4	4
Q	(Japan) S Shimabukuro	2	1	6^{4}
Q	(France) H Gaston	6	6	7^{7}
(Spain) B Zapata Miralles	6	6	6
WC	(United States) E Quinn	4	4	3
(France) A Müller	0	2	3
2	(Serbia) N Djokovic	6	6	6

Second round
(United States) M McDonald	3	4	4
Q	(Croatia) B Gojo	6	6	6
PR	(Czech Republic) J Veselý	7^{7}	6	3	2	7^{10}
20	(Argentina) F Cerúndolo	6^{5}	2	6	6	6^{6}
32	(Serbia) L Djere	6	6	6
Q	(France) H Gaston	1	2	3
(Spain) B Zapata Miralles	4	1	1
2	(Serbia) N Djokovic	6	6	6

Third round
Q	(Croatia) B Gojo	6	6	6
PR	(Czech Republic) J Veselý	4	3	2
32	(Serbia) L Djere	6	6	1	1	3
2	(Serbia) N Djokovic	4	4	6	6	6

Fourth round
Q	(Croatia) B Gojo	2	5	4
2	(Serbia) N Djokovic	6	7	6

== Seeded players ==
The following are the seeded players. Seedings are based on ATP rankings as of August 21, 2023. Rankings and points before are as of August 28, 2023.

Seed	Rank	Player	Points before	Points defending	Points won	Points after	Status
1	1	(Spain) Carlos Alcaraz	9,815	2,000	720	8,535	Semifinals lost to Daniil Medvedev [3]
2	2	(Serbia) Novak Djokovic	9,795	0	2,000	11,795	Champion, defeated Daniil Medvedev [3]
3	3	Daniil Medvedev	6,260	180	1,200	7,280	Runner-up, lost to (Serbia) Novak Djokovic [2]
4	4	(Denmark) Holger Rune	4,790	90	10	4,710	First round lost to (Spain) Roberto Carballés Baena
5	5	(Norway) Casper Ruud	4,715	1,200	45	3,560	Second round lost to (China) Zhang Zhizhen
6	6	(Italy) Jannik Sinner	4,645	360	180	4,465	Fourth round lost to (Germany) Alexander Zverev [12]
7	7	(Greece) Stefanos Tsitsipas	4,580	10	45	4,615	Second round lost to (Switzerland) Dominic Stricker [Q]
8	8	Andrey Rublev	4,515	360	360	4,515	Quarterfinals lost to Daniil Medvedev [3]
9	9	(United States) Taylor Fritz	3,605	10	360	3,955	Quarterfinals lost to (Serbia) Novak Djokovic [2]
10	10	(United States) Frances Tiafoe	3,050	720	360	2,690	Quarterfinals lost to (United States) Ben Shelton
11	11	Karen Khachanov	2,845	720	10	2,135	First round lost to (United States) Michael Mmoh [WC]
12	12	(Germany) Alexander Zverev	2,670	0	360	3,030	Quarterfinals lost to (Spain) Carlos Alcaraz [1]
13	13	(Australia) Alex de Minaur	2,595	90	180	2,685	Fourth round lost to Daniil Medvedev [3]
14	14	(United States) Tommy Paul	2,570	90	180	2,660	Fourth round lost to (United States) Ben Shelton
15	15	(Canada) Félix Auger-Aliassime	2,375	45	10	2,340	First round lost to (United States) Mackenzie McDonald
16	16	(United Kingdom) Cameron Norrie	2,075	180	90	1,985	Third round lost to (Italy) Matteo Arnaldi
17	17	(Poland) Hubert Hurkacz	2,035	45	45	2,035	Second round lost to (United Kingdom) Jack Draper
18	18	(Italy) Lorenzo Musetti	2,005	90	10	1,925	First round lost to (France) Titouan Droguet [Q]
19	19	(Bulgaria) Grigor Dimitrov	1,690	45	90	1,735	Third round lost to (Germany) Alexander Zverev [12]
20	20	(Argentina) Francisco Cerúndolo	1,600	10	45	1,635	Second round lost to (Czech Republic) Jiří Veselý [PR]
21	21	(Spain) Alejandro Davidovich Fokina	1,525	180	90	1,435	Third round lost to (United States) Tommy Paul [14]
22	35	(France) Adrian Mannarino	1,206	10	90	1,286	Third round lost to (United States) Frances Tiafoe [10]
23	25	(Chile) Nicolás Jarry	1,439	35	90	1,494	Third round lost to (Australia) Alex de Minaur [13]
24	24	(Netherlands) Tallon Griekspoor	1,446	10	10	1,446	First round lost to (France) Arthur Fils
25	27	(Kazakhstan) Alexander Bublik	1,384	45	10	1,349	First round lost to (Austria) Dominic Thiem
26	28	(United Kingdom) Dan Evans	1,381	90	90	1,381	Third round lost to (Spain) Carlos Alcaraz [1]
27	23	(Croatia) Borna Ćorić	1,450	45	10	1,415	First round lost to (Argentina) Sebastián Báez
28	30	(United States) Christopher Eubanks	1,338	70	45	1,313	Second round lost to (France) Benjamin Bonzi [WC]
29	33	(France) Ugo Humbert	1,258	0	10	1,268	First round lost to (Italy) Matteo Berrettini
30	34	(Argentina) Tomás Martín Etcheverry	1,250	10	45	1,320	Second round lost to (Switzerland) Stan Wawrinka
31	31	(United States) Sebastian Korda	1,330	45	10	1,295	First round lost to (Hungary) Márton Fucsovics
32	38	(Serbia) Laslo Djere	1,110	10	90	1,190	Third round lost to (Serbia) Novak Djokovic [2]

=== Withdrawn players ===
The following players would have been seeded, but withdrew before the tournament began.

Rank	Player	Points before	Points defending	Points after	Withdrawal reason
22	(Germany) Jan-Lennard Struff	1,482	8	1,474	Hip injury
26	(Canada) Denis Shapovalov	1,415	90	1,325	Knee injury

== Other entry information ==
=== Wild cards ===
- (France) Benjamin Bonzi
- (Australia) Rinky Hijikata
- (United States) John Isner
- (United States) Steve Johnson
- (United States) Alex Michelsen
- (United States) Michael Mmoh
- (United States) Ethan Quinn
- (United States) Learner Tien

=== Protected ranking ===
- (Canada) Milos Raonic (33)
- (France) Gaël Monfils (35)
- (South Africa) Lloyd Harris (47)
- ~~(Japan) Kei Nishikori (48)~~
- (Bolivia) Hugo Dellien (73)
- (Argentina) Guido Pella (75)
- (Czech Republic) Jiří Veselý (94)
- (Hungary) Attila Balázs (101)

=== Qualifiers ===
- (France) Enzo Couacaud
- (Japan) Taro Daniel
- (France) Titouan Droguet
- (France) Hugo Gaston
- (Croatia) Borna Gojo
- (Chinese Taipei) Hsu Yu-hsiou
- (Brazil) Felipe Meligeni Alves
- (Czech Republic) Jakub Menšík
- (United States) Nicolas Moreno de Alboran
- (United States) Emilio Nava
- (Japan) Sho Shimabukuro
- (Kazakhstan) Timofey Skatov
- (Switzerland) Dominic Stricker
- (United States) Zachary Svajda
- (Italy) Stefano Travaglia
- (Finland) Otto Virtanen

=== Lucky losers ===
- (France) Arthur Cazaux
- (Australia) James Duckworth

=== Withdrawals ===
- † (Sweden) Mikael Ymer (51) → replaced by Alexander Shevchenko (96)
- ‡ (Germany) Jan-Lennard Struff (24) → replaced by (Argentina) Facundo Díaz Acosta (97)
- ‡ (Australia) Nick Kyrgios (37) → replaced by (Argentina) Diego Schwartzman (98)
- ‡ (Spain) Pablo Carreño Busta (22) → replaced by (Moldova) Radu Albot (99)
- ‡ (United States) Reilly Opelka (33 PR) → replaced by (Argentina) Juan Manuel Cerúndolo (100)
- ‡ (Croatia) Marin Čilić (21 PR) → replaced by (South Korea) Kwon Soon-woo (101)
- ‡ (Canada) Denis Shapovalov (23) → replaced by (Hungary) Attila Balázs (101 PR)
- ‡ (Spain) Roberto Bautista Agut (25) → replaced by (Japan) Yosuke Watanuki (104)
- § (Japan) Kei Nishikori (48 PR) → replaced by (Australia) James Duckworth (LL)
- § (Finland) Emil Ruusuvuori (48) → replaced by (France) Arthur Cazaux (LL)

† – not included on entry list
‡ – withdrew from entry list
§ – withdrew from main draw

Preceded by 2023 Wimbledon Championships – Men's singles	Grand Slam men's singles	Succeeded by 2024 Australian Open – Men's singles
