= Ethan Quinn =

American tennis player (born 2004)

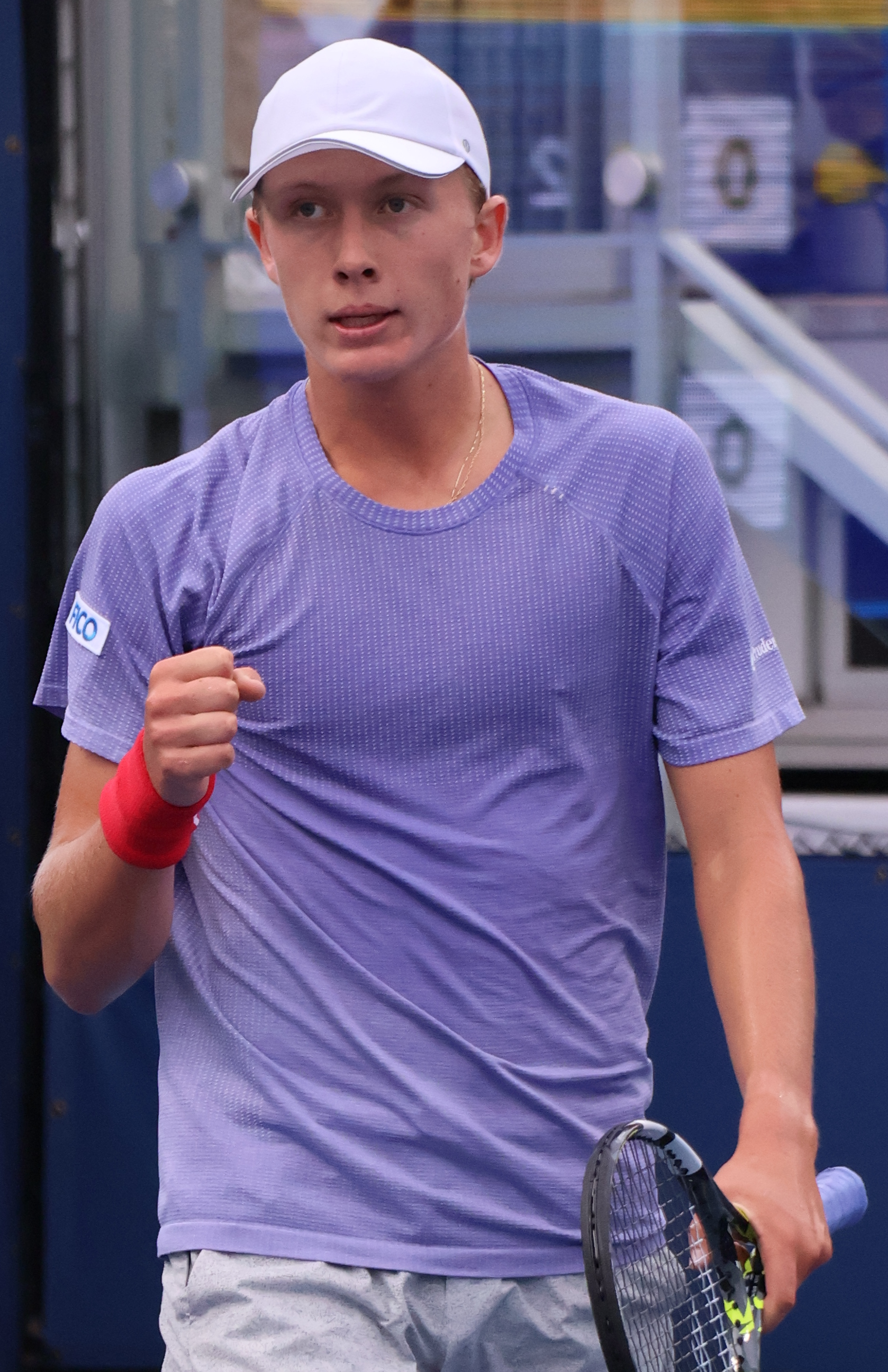
- Quinn at the 2023 US Open
- Country (sports): United States
- Born: March 12, 2004 (age 22) Fresno, California, US
- Height: 6 ft 3 in (1.91 m)
- Turned pro: 2023
- Plays: Right-handed (two-handed backhand)
- College: University of Georgia
- Coach: Brad Stine, Brian Garber
- Prize money: US $2,300,807

Singles
- Career record: 27–39
- Career titles: 0
- Highest ranking: No. 45 (July 20, 2026)
- Current ranking: No. 68 (November 9, 2026)

Grand Slam singles results
- Australian Open: 3R (2026)
- French Open: 3R (2025)
- Wimbledon: 2R (2025, 2026)
- US Open: 1R (2023, 2025)

Doubles
- Career record: 4–15
- Career titles: 0
- Highest ranking: No. 325 (March 17, 2025)
- Current ranking: No. 508 (July 20, 2026)

Grand Slam doubles results
- US Open: 2R (2022, 2025)

Grand Slam mixed doubles results
- US Open: 2R (2023)
- Last updated on: 2 August 2026.

Ethan Quinn (born March 12, 2004) is an American professional tennis player. He has a career-high ATP singles ranking of world No. 45 achieved on July 20, 2026 and a best doubles ranking of No. 325 achieved on March 17, 2025.

== Early life ==
Quinn was born in Fresno, California. His parents were former tennis players. Quinn attended the San Joaquin Memorial High School in Fresno, California.

== College years ==
Quinn was an early enrollee at the University of Georgia in January 2022. He was ranked the No. 1 national junior prospect recruit in 2022. In May 2023, Quinn won the 2023 NCAA Singles Championship for the Georgia Bulldogs.

== Career ==
=== 2022: Major doubles debut ===
Quinn won the doubles at the 2022 USTA Boys 18s National Championship with his partner Nicholas Godsick which earned them a wildcard into the main draw of the 2022 US Open. They won the final with a 6–4, 6–0 defeat of Sebastian Gorzny and Alex Michelsen who had been top seeds following their 2022 Wimbledon Junior doubles victory. In the singles event at the same competition, Quinn also reached the final but lost to Learner Tien in 4 sets. For reaching the final, Quinn gained a wildcard into the singles qualifying at Flushing Meadow. In the first round of the qualifying event at Flushing Meadows, Quinn defeated his higher ranked opponent Ernesto Escobedo with a score of 5–7, 6–4, 6–4. At the US Open in the doubles main draw with Godsick, the pairing beat Nikoloz Basilashvili and Hans Hach Verdugo in first round, before then losing their round two match against the sixth-seeded team of Nikola Mektic and Mate Pavic of Croatia.

=== 2023: Turned pro: Major singles debut, first ATP win ===
After winning the 2023 NCAA Singles Championship in May 2023, Quinn turned professional one month later.

At the US Open, he entered as a wildcard entry in all three of the events he was eligible for: he lost in the first round of the men's singles and men's doubles, but he and partner Ashlyn Krueger made it to the second round of the mixed doubles.

=== 2024: Masters debut ===
Quinn received a wildcard at the 2024 Dallas Open for his debut at the tournament.

Having also received a wildcard for the qualifying event for the 2024 BNP Paribas Open in Indian Wells, Quinn qualified for the main draw, making his Masters debut.

Quinn recorded his second ATP Tour win at the 2024 Hall of Fame Open over Marc Polmans, having recorded his first one at the same tournament in 2023 over Mukund Sasikumar also as a wildcard. At the US Open Quinn lost to Valentin Royer in the second round of qualifying but reached a new career-high ranking of No. 236 on 26 August 2024. Quinn won his maiden Challenger title at the 2024 Champaign Challenger, over Nishesh Basavareddy.

=== 2025: French Open third round, top 100 ===
Following reaching the final at the 2025 Canberra Tennis International as a qualifier, Quinn entered the top 160 in the singles rankings on 27 January 2025. In March 2025, ranked No. 137, Quinn qualified again for the main draw in Indian Wells and also for the main draw in Miami. In April, Quinn reached the main draw at the 2025 Barcelona Open Banc Sabadell, and also qualified for his next Masters 1000 main draw at the 2025 Mutua Madrid Open, where he defeated fellow qualifier Dušan Lajović.

Ranked No. 106 at the 2025 French Open, Quinn recorded his first major main-draw wins after qualifying over Grigor Dimitrov by retirement, and over lucky loser Alexander Shevchenko in five sets, to reach a major third round for the first time in his career. As a result, he entered the top 100 in the singles rankings on 9 June 2025.

At the 2025 Wimbledon Championships he recorded a first-round win over 2023 Wimbledon junior champion Henry Searle.

=== 2026: Major third round, ATP final, top 50 ===
Making his debut at the 2026 Australian Open in January, Quinn reached the third round with two straight sets wins defeating 23rd seed Tallon Griekspoor and Hubert Hurkacz. The following month, he made his Davis Cup debut for the United States with a victory against Fabian Marozsan of Hungary.

In March, Quinn played in Indian Wells, where he lost in the first round to compatriot Reilly Opelka. With this early defeat, he took part at the Arizona Tennis Classic in Phoenix – a Challenger 175 event – the following week. The young American lifted the biggest title of his career with wins over alternate Billy Harris, and in an all-American final, over seventh seed Marcos Giron.

At the Mallorca Open Quinn reached his first ATP semifinal defeating Vit Kopriva. He then reached the final with a win over Nuno Borges.

== Style of play ==
Former French Open doubles champion Luke Jensen on ESPN commentary marked the Quinn forehand with the phrase "That’s the hammer! That’s the cannon! Unleash the beast". In his US Open qualifying win over Ernesto Escobedo, Quinn was regularly hitting 120 mph first serves whilst displaying a second serve that sufficiently kicked high and wide that for some it drew favourable comparisons with Quinn's compatriot John Isner.

== Endorsements ==
Quinn signed on as a paid promoter for Prudential Insurance before the 2023 US Open and appeared in commercials throughout the tournament.

== Performance timelines ==
Key
W	F	SF	QF	#R	RR	Q#	P#	DNQ	A	Z#	PO	G	S	B	NMS	NTI	P	NH

(W) winner; (F) finalist; (SF) semifinalist; (QF) quarterfinalist; (#R) rounds 4, 3, 2, 1; (RR) round-robin stage; (Q#) qualification round; (P#) preliminary round; (DNQ) did not qualify; (A) absent; (Z#) Davis/Fed Cup Zonal Group (with number indication) or (PO) play-off; (G) gold, (S) silver or (B) bronze Olympic/Paralympic medal; (NMS) not a Masters tournament; (NTI) not a Tier I tournament; (P) postponed; (NH) not held; (SR) strike rate (events won / competed); (W–L) win–loss record.
To avoid confusion and double counting, these charts are updated at the conclusion of a tournament or when the player's participation has ended.

=== Singles ===
Current through the 2026 ATP Tour.

Tournament	2022	2023	2024	2025	2026	SR	W–L	Win%
Grand Slam tournaments
Australian Open	A	A	A	Q2	3R	0 / 1	2–1	67%
French Open	A	A	A	3R	1R	0 / 2	2–2	50%
Wimbledon	A	A	A	2R	2R	0 / 2	2–2	50%
US Open	Q2	1R	Q2	1R		0 / 2	0–2	0%
Win–loss	0–0	0–1	0–0	3–3	3–3	0 / 7	6–7	46%
ATP Masters 1000
Indian Wells	A	A	1R	1R	1R	0 / 3	0–3	0%
Miami Open	A	A	A	1R	3R	0 / 2	2–2	50%
Madrid Open	A	A	A	2R	1R	0 / 2	1–2	50%
Italian Open	A	A	A	Q1	1R	0 / 1	0–1	0%
Canadian Open	A	A	A	2R	A	0 / 1	1–1	50%
Cincinnati Open	A	A	A	2R	A	0 / 1	1–1	50%
Shanghai Masters	A	A	A	1R		0 / 1	0–1	0%
Paris Masters	A	A	A	1R		0 / 1	0–1	0%
Win–loss	0–0	0–0	0–1	3–7	2–5	0 / 13	5–13	28%
Career statistics
Tournaments	0	3	3	18	15	39		
Overall win–loss	0–0	1–3	1–3	12–18	13–15	0 / 39	27–39	41%
Year-end ranking	454	344	202	70				

== ATP Tour finals ==
=== Singles: 1 (runner-up) ===
Legend Grand Slam (–) ATP 1000 (–) ATP 500 (–) ATP 250 (0–1)	Finals by surface Hard (–) Clay (–) Grass (0–1)	Finals by setting Outdoor (0–1) Indoor (–)

Result	W–L	Date	Tournament	Tier	Surface	Opponent	Score
Loss	0–1	Jun 2026	Mallorca Open, Spain	ATP 250	Grass	(Spain) Alejandro Davidovich Fokina	6–7^{(4–7)}, 3–6

== ATP Challenger and ITF Tour finals ==
=== Singles: 8 (5 titles, 3 runner-ups) ===
Legend ATP Challenger Tour (2–2) ITF WT Tour (3–1)	Finals by surface Hard (5–2) Clay (0–1)

Result	W–L	Date	Tournament	Tier	Surface	Opponent	Score
Loss	0–1	Jan 2024	Cleveland Open, US	Challenger	Hard (i)	(United States) Patrick Kypson	6–4, 3–6, 2–6
Win	1–1	Nov 2024	Champaign Challenger, US	Challenger	Hard (i)	(United States) Nishesh Basavareddy	6–3, 6–1
Loss	1–2	Jan 2025	Canberra International, Australia	Challenger	Hard	(Brazil) João Fonseca	4–6, 4–6
Win	2–2	Mar 2026	Arizona Tennis Classic, US	Challenger	Hard	(United States) Marcos Giron	7–6^{(7–1)}, 4–6, 7–5

Result	W–L	Date	Tournament	Tier	Surface	Opponent	Score
Loss	0–1	May 2022	M15 Vero Beach, US	WTT	Clay	(United States) Sekou Bangoura	4–6, 3–6
Win	1–1	Jun 2022	M15 San Diego, US	WTT	Hard	(Denmark) August Holmgren	3–6, 7–6^{(9–7)}, 7–6^{(7–4)}
Win	2–1	Jul 2022	M25 Champaign, US	WTT	Hard	(United States) Stefan Dostanic	6–4, 6–7^{(4–7)}, 6–2
Win	3–1	Jun 2023	M25 Wichita, US	WTT	Hard	(United States) Ozan Baris	6–3, 7–5

=== Doubles: 5 (2 titles, 3 runner-ups) ===
Legend ATP Challenger Tour (0–2) ITF WT Tour (2–1)	Finals by surface Hard (2–2) Clay (0–1)

Result	W–L	Date	Tournament	Tier	Surface	Partner	Opponents	Score
Loss	0–1	Apr 2024	Sarasota Open, US	Challenger	Clay	(United States) Tennys Sandgren	(United States) Tristan Boyer (United Kingdom) Oliver Crawford	4–6, 2–6
Loss	0–2	Sep 2024	Columbus Challenger, US	Challenger	Hard (i)	(United States) Christian Harrison	(Mexico) Hans Hach Verdugo (Japan) James Trotter	4–6, 7–6^{(8–6)}, [9–11]

Result	W–L	Date	Tournament	Tier	Surface	Partner	Opponents	Score
Loss	0–1	Jun 2022	M15 San Diego, US	WTT	Hard	(United States) Siem Woldeab	(China) Li Zhe (Chinese Taipei) Yang Tsung-hua	4–6, 6–3, [8–10]
Win	1–1	Jun 2022	M15 Los Angeles, US	WTT	Hard	(Paraguay) Daniel Vallejo	(United States) Aidan Mayo (United States) Keenan Mayo	7–5, 6–4
Win	2–1	Jul 2022	M15 Fountain Valley, US	WTT	Hard	(Paraguay) Daniel Vallejo	(Ghana) Abraham Asaba (United States) Sekou Bangoura	6–0, 3–6, [10–8]
