= 2022 Arizona Tennis Classic =

- Date: 14–20 March
- Edition: 2nd
- Surface: Hard
- Location: Phoenix, United States

Champions

Singles
- (United States) Denis Kudla

Doubles
- (Philippines) Treat Huey / (United States) Denis Kudla
← 2019 ·	Arizona Tennis Classic	· 2023 →

The 2022 Arizona Tennis Classic was a professional tennis tournament played on hardcourts. It was the second edition of the tournament which was part of the 2022 ATP Challenger Tour. It took place in Phoenix, United States between March 14 and March 20, 2022.

Denis Kudla won both the singles and doubles (with partner Treat Huey) titles, making it the first time since 2014 he swept both titles at a tennis tournament.

== Singles main draw entrants ==
=== Seeds ===
Country	Player	Rank^{1}	Seed
FRA	Benoît Paire	53	1
ITA	Lorenzo Musetti	56	2
FRA	Arthur Rinderknech	57	3
GER	Jan-Lennard Struff	58	4
ARG	Sebastián Báez	60	5
FRA	Hugo Gaston	68	6
FIN	Emil Ruusuvuori	70	7
BEL	David Goffin	71	8

- ^{1} Rankings are as of 7 March 2022.

=== Other entrants ===
The following players received wildcards into the singles main draw:

- (United States) Christopher Eubanks
- (United States) Brandon Nakashima
- (United States) J. J. Wolf

The following player received entry into the singles main draw using a protected ranking:

- (Spain) Fernando Verdasco

The following players received entry into the singles main draw as alternates:

- (Moldova) Radu Albot
- (Germany) Daniel Altmaier
- (United Kingdom) Liam Broady
- (Italy) Marco Cecchinato
- (United States) Denis Kudla
- (Germany) Oscar Otte
- (Australia) Aleksandar Vukic

The following players received entry from the qualifying draw:

- (United States) Aleksandar Kovacevic
- (United States) Mitchell Krueger
- (Kazakhstan) Mikhail Kukushkin
- (United States) Emilio Nava
- (Australia) Max Purcell
- (France) Gilles Simon

The following player received entry as a lucky loser:

- (Germany) Mats Moraing

== Champions ==
=== Singles ===
- (United States) Denis Kudla def. (Germany) Daniel Altmaier 2–6, 6–2, 6–3.

=== Doubles ===
- (Philippines) Treat Huey / (United States) Denis Kudla def. (Germany) Oscar Otte / (Germany) Jan-Lennard Struff 7–6^{(12–10)}, 3–6, [10–6].
