= 2022 Arizona Tennis Classic – Doubles =

Doubles
- 2022 Arizona Tennis Classic

Final
- Champions: (Philippines) Treat Huey (United States) Denis Kudla
- Runners-up: (Germany) Oscar Otte (Germany) Jan-Lennard Struff
- Score: 7–6^{(12–10)}, 3–6, [10–6]

Events
Singles	Doubles
- Arizona Tennis Classic

Treat Huey and Denis Kudla defeated Oscar Otte and Jan-Lennard Struff in the final, 7–6^{(12–10)}, 3–6, [10–6], to win the doubles tennis title at the 2022 Arizona Tennis Classic.

Jamie Murray and Neal Skupski were the defending champions, but did not return to defend their title.

== Seeds ==
1. (Croatia) Nikola Mektić / (Croatia) Mate Pavić (semifinals)
2. (France) Nicolas Mahut / (France) Fabrice Martin (quarterfinals)
3. (Germany) Andreas Mies / (Australia) Max Purcell (quarterfinals)
4. (Uruguay) Ariel Behar / (Ecuador) Gonzalo Escobar (quarterfinals)

== Draw ==
Key

- Q = Qualifier
- WC = Wild card
- LL = Lucky loser
- Alt = Alternate
- ITF = ITF entry
- PR = Protected ranking
- SR = Special ranking
- SE = Special exempt
- JE = Junior exempt
- JR = Junior Accelerator Programme entrant
- CO = College Accelerator Programme entrant
- NG = Next Gen Accelerator Program entrant
- w/o = Walkover
- r = Retired
- d = Defaulted

First round
1	(Croatia) N Mektić (Croatia) M Pavić	3	6	[10]
(United States) H Reese (Netherlands) S Verbeek	6	4	[4]
(France) S Doumbia (France) F Reboul	6	6^{8}	[5]
(Sweden) A Göransson (United States) N Lammons	3	7^{10}	[10]
4	(Uruguay) A Behar (Ecuador) G Escobar	6	6
(Bosnia and Herzegovina) T Brkić (Serbia) N Ćaćić	4	4
(Germany) O Otte (Germany) J-L Struff	6	6
(France) H Gaston (France) A Rinderknech	2	3
(United States) N Monroe (Australia) J-P Smith	2	4
PR	(Philippines) T Huey (United States) D Kudla	6	6
Alt	(France) B Paire (France) G Simon	2	0
3	(Germany) A Mies (Australia) M Purcell	6	6
WC	(United States) E King (United States) A Lawson	7^{7}	2	[6]
(Mexico) H Hach Verdugo (United States) A Krajicek	6^{4}	6	[10]
(United States) R Galloway (United States) J Withrow	3	4
2	(France) N Mahut (France) F Martin	6	6

Quarterfinals
1	(Croatia) N Mektić (Croatia) M Pavić	7^{7}	7
(Sweden) A Göransson (United States) N Lammons	6^{4}	5
4	(Uruguay) A Behar (Ecuador) G Escobar	6	5	[8]
(Germany) O Otte (Germany) J-L Struff	2	7	[10]
PR	(Philippines) T Huey (United States) D Kudla	6	3	[10]
3	(Germany) A Mies (Australia) M Purcell	1	6	[6]
(Mexico) H Hach Verdugo (United States) A Krajicek	6	6
2	(France) N Mahut (France) F Martin	3	4

Semifinals
1	(Croatia) N Mektić (Croatia) M Pavić	5	6	[7]
(Germany) O Otte (Germany) J-L Struff	7	2	[10]
PR	(Philippines) T Huey (United States) D Kudla	5	7	[10]
(Mexico) H Hach Verdugo (United States) A Krajicek	7	5	[8]

Final
(Germany) O Otte (Germany) J-L Struff	6^{10}	6	[6]
PR	(Philippines) T Huey (United States) D Kudla	7^{12}	3	[10]
