= ATP Challenger Tour 175 =

Annual men's tennis tournament

The ATP Challenger 175 tournaments are the highest tier of annual men's tennis tournaments on the ATP Challenger Tour, with 175 ranking points awarded to each singles champion. The series was established in 2023 and currently consists of six events per year.

== Events ==
The Estoril tournament was played for the first time as an ATP Challenger 175 in 2025 (downgraded from ATP 250 status in previous years), before returning to its original status in 2026. The Copa Cap Cana had its inaugural edition in 2025.

The Cagliari, Sardegna event, held in 2023 and in 2024 as an ATP Challenger 175, was removed from the calendar in 2025 and made its return in 2026. The Copa Faulconbridge in Valencia was upgraded to a Challenger 175 event also in 2026.

Tournament	Officially known as	City	Country	Surface
Phoenix	Arizona Tennis Classic	Phoenix	United States	Hard
Punta Cana	Copa Cap Cana	Punta Cana	Dominican Republic	Hard
Aix-en-Provence	Open Aix Provence Crédit Agricole	Aix-en-Provence	France	Clay
Cagliari (2023–2024, 2026–)	Sardegna Open	Cagliari	Italy	Clay
Estoril (only in 2025)	Estoril Open	Estoril	Portugal	Clay
Bordeaux	BNP Paribas Primrose Bordeaux	Bordeaux	France	Clay
Valencia (2026–)	Copa Faulconbridge	Valencia	Spain	Clay
Turin (2023–2025)	Piemonte Open Intesa Sanpaolo	Turin	Italy	Clay

== ATP points ==
Event	W	F	SF	QF	Round of 16	Round of 32	Q	Q2	Q1
Men's singles	175	90	50	25	13	0	6	3	0
Men's doubles	175	100	60	32	0	—N/a	—N/a	—N/a	—N/a

== Singles champions ==
	2023	2024	2025	2026
Phoenix	(Portugal) Borges	(Portugal) Borges	(Brazil) Fonseca	(United States) Quinn
Punta Cana	Not an event		(United States) Kovacevic	(Argentina) Navone
Aix-en-Provence	(United Kingdom) Murray	(Chile) Tabilo	(Croatia) Ćorić	(Chile) Tabilo
Estoril	ATP 250		(United States) Michelsen	ATP 250
Cagliari	(France) Humbert	(Argentina) Navone	Not held	(Italy) Arnaldi
Bordeaux	(France) Humbert	(France) Fils	(France) Mpetshi Perricard	(Argentina) JM Cerúndolo
Valencia	ATP 100	ATP 125		(Serbia) Kecmanović
Turin	(Germany) Koepfer	(Italy) Passaro	(Kazakhstan) Bublik	Not held

== Statistics ==
=== Most titles ===
Rank	Player	Titles
1	(Chile) Tabilo	2
1	(Argentina) Navone	2
1	(Portugal) Borges	2
1	(France) Humbert	2

== See also ==
- ATP Challenger Tour
- ATP Challenger Tour 125
- ATP Challenger Tour Finals
- ATP Tour
