= 2019 Arizona Tennis Classic =

ATP tennis tournament in Phoenix

- Date: 11–17 March
- Edition: 1st
- Draw: 48S / 4Q / 16D
- Surface: Hard
- Location: Phoenix, Arizona, United States

Champions

Singles
- (Italy) Matteo Berrettini

Doubles
- (United Kingdom) Jamie Murray / (United Kingdom) Neal Skupski
- Arizona Tennis Classic

The 2019 Arizona Tennis Classic was a professional tennis tournament played on hard courts. It was the first edition of the tournament which was part of the 2019 ATP Challenger Tour. It took place in Phoenix, Arizona, United States between March 11 and March 17, 2019.

== Singles main-draw entrants ==
=== Seeds ===
Country	Player	Rank^{1}	Seed
BEL	David Goffin	21	1
FRA	Jérémy Chardy	37	2
AUS	John Millman	42	3
KAZ	Mikhail Kukushkin	43	4
AUS	Matthew Ebden	49	5
ITA	Matteo Berrettini	57	6
~~TUN~~	~~Malek Jaziri~~	~~60~~	~~7~~
JPN	Taro Daniel	71	8
LAT	Ernests Gulbis	79	9
GER	Peter Gojowczyk	85	10
CHI	Nicolás Jarry	86	11
ARG	Guido Andreozzi	88	12
~~USA~~	~~Bradley Klahn~~	~~90~~	~~13~~
RSA	Lloyd Harris	92	14
NOR	Casper Ruud	94	15
BLR	Ilya Ivashka	96	16

- ^{1} Rankings are as of 4 March 2019.

=== Other entrants ===
The following players received wildcards into the singles main draw:

- (France) Jérémy Chardy
- (Belgium) David Goffin
- (Latvia) Ernests Gulbis
- (Australia) John Millman
- (Chinese Taipei) Tseng Chun-hsin

The following players received entry into the singles main draw as alternates:

- (Italy) Andrea Arnaboldi
- (Italy) Salvatore Caruso
- (United States) Ernesto Escobedo
- (Belarus) Egor Gerasimov
- (Serbia) Peđa Krstin
- (Spain) Nicola Kuhn
- (Japan) Yasutaka Uchiyama
- (Sweden) Mikael Ymer

The following players received entry from the qualifying draw:

- (Denmark) Frederik Nielsen
- (United States) Nathan Ponwith

The following players received entry as lucky losers:

- (Czech Republic) Dominik Kellovský
- (France) Fabrice Martin

== Champions ==
=== Singles ===
- (Italy) Matteo Berrettini def. (Kazakhstan) Mikhail Kukushkin 3–6, 7–6^{(8–6)}, 7–6^{(7–2)}.

=== Doubles ===
- (United Kingdom) Jamie Murray / (United Kingdom) Neal Skupski def. (United States) Austin Krajicek / (New Zealand) Artem Sitak 6–7^{(2–7)}, 7–5, [10–6].
