= 2026 Arizona Tennis Classic =

- Date: March 10–15
- Edition: 6th
- Surface: Hard
- Location: Phoenix, United States

Champions

Singles
- (United States) Ethan Quinn

Doubles
- (Ecuador) Diego Hidalgo / (United States) Patrik Trhac
- Arizona Tennis Classic

The 2026 Arizona Tennis Classic was a professional tennis tournament played on hardcourts. It was the sixth edition of the tournament, which was part of the 2026 ATP Challenger Tour. It took place in Phoenix, United States, between March 10 and 15, 2026.

== Singles main draw entrants ==
=== Seeds ===
Country	Player	Rank^{1}	Seed
FRA	Corentin Moutet	33	1
~~BEL~~	~~Zizou Bergs~~	~~47~~	~~2~~
FRA	Adrian Mannarino	48	3
POR	Nuno Borges	49	4
FRA	Térence Atmane	52	5
POL	Kamil Majchrzak	57	6
USA	Marcos Giron	69	7
USA	Ethan Quinn	73	8

- ^{1} Rankings are as of March 2, 2026.

=== Other entrants ===
The following players received wildcards into the singles main draw:

- (United States) Darwin Blanch
- (United States) Mitchell Krueger
- (United States) Michael Mmoh

The following players received entry into the singles main draw as alternates:

- (Georgia (country)) Nikoloz Basilashvili
- (Australia) Alex Bolt
- (France) Benjamin Bonzi
- (United Kingdom) Billy Harris
- (Spain) Daniel Mérida

The following players received entry from the qualifying draw:

- (Jamaica) Blaise Bicknell
- (Japan) Jay Dylan Friend
- (United States) Stefan Kozlov
- (Italy) Stefano Travaglia

The following player received entry as a lucky loser:

- (Switzerland) Leandro Riedi

== Champions ==
=== Singles ===
- (United States) Ethan Quinn def. (United States) Marcos Giron 7–6^{(7–1)}, 4–6, 7–5.

=== Doubles ===
- (Ecuador) Diego Hidalgo / (United States) Patrik Trhac def. (Monaco) Hugo Nys / (France) Édouard Roger-Vasselin 6–7^{(6–8)}, 6–3, [10–4].
