= Alexander Bublik =

Kazakh tennis player (born 1997)

Alexander Bublik Александр Бублик
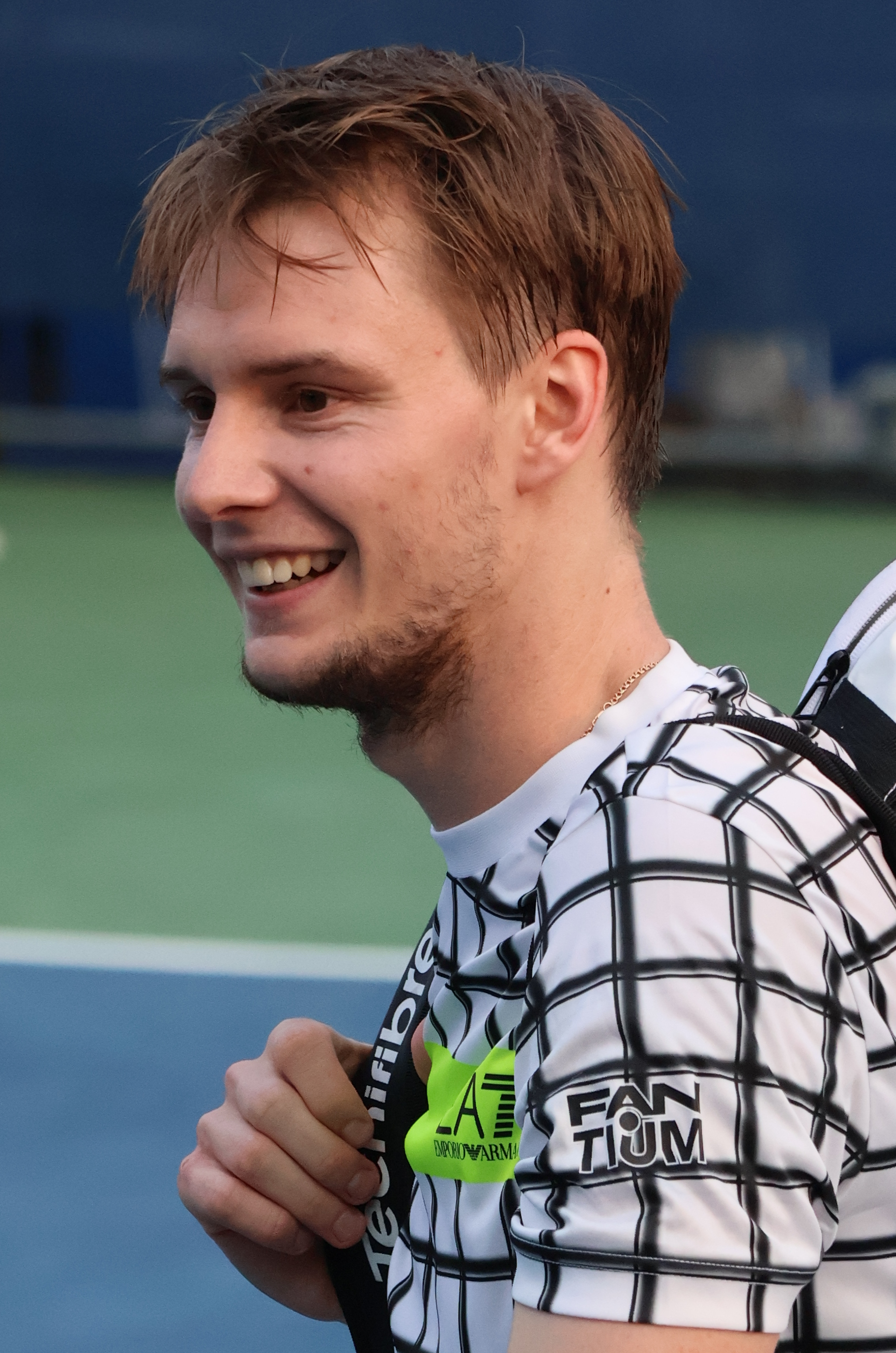
- Bublik in 2023
- Full name: Alexander Stanislavovich Bublik
- Country (sports): Kazakhstan (2016–); Russia (2016)
- Born: 17 June 1997 (age 29) Gatchina, Russia
- Height: 1.96 m (6 ft 5 in)
- Turned pro: 2016
- Plays: Right-handed (two-handed backhand)
- Coach: Artyom Suprunov
- Prize money: US $12,658,208

Singles
- Career record: 215–189
- Career titles: 9
- Highest ranking: No. 10 (12 January 2026)
- Current ranking: No. 26 (9 November 2026)

Grand Slam singles results
- Australian Open: 4R (2026)
- French Open: QF (2025)
- Wimbledon: 4R (2023, 2026)
- US Open: 4R (2025)

Other tournaments
- Olympic Games: 1R (2021, 2024)

Doubles
- Career record: 46–96
- Career titles: 0
- Highest ranking: No. 47 (8 November 2021)
- Current ranking: No. 367 (31 August 2026)

Grand Slam doubles results
- Australian Open: SF (2020)
- French Open: F (2021)
- Wimbledon: 2R (2019)
- US Open: 2R (2022, 2026)

Other doubles tournaments
- Olympic Games: 1R (2021, 2024)

Grand Slam mixed doubles results
- Australian Open: 1R (2021)
- French Open: 1R (2022)
- Wimbledon: 1R (2021)

Team competitions
- Davis Cup: 7–3
Medal record
Men's tennis
Representing Kazakhstan
Asian Games
Silver medal – second place	2018 Jakarta	Men's doubles
- Last updated on: 31 August 2026.

Alexander Stanislavovich "Sasha" Bublik (Russian: Александр Станиславович Бублик; born 17 June 1997) is a Russian-born Kazakhstani professional tennis player. He has a career-high ATP singles ranking of world No.10

achieved on 12 January 2026, the first Kazakhstani man to reach the ATP top 10. He has won nine ATP Tour singles titles, and is the current Kazakhstani men's No. 1. He also has a career-high doubles ranking of No. 47 achieved on 8 November 2021.

Bublik recorded his greatest success at a Grand Slam event at the 2025 French Open where he reached the quarterfinals in singles but was defeated by Jannik Sinner 6-1, 7-5, 6-0, the first Kazakhstani man to achieve the feat. Bublik was also the runner-up in doubles at the 2021 French Open, partnering fellow countryman Andrey Golubev, the first Kazakhstani male players to contest a major final.

== Early life ==
Alexander Stanislavovich Bublik was born on 17 June 1997 in Gatchina, Russia, and began playing tennis at the age of four. He was coached by his father, Stanislav.

== Juniors ==
On the ITF junior circuit, Bublik reached a combined ranking of world No. 19 and won eleven titles in total, six in singles and five in doubles.

== Professional career ==
=== 2016: Futures titles and first ATP wins ===
Bublik began that season ranked No. 964. He won his first professional title, a Futures-level event in Doha, Qatar, in April 2016, followed by trophies in Russia and Sweden.

He made his ATP main-draw debut at the 2016 St. Petersburg Open, where he received wildcards into both the singles and doubles main draw.

Bublik qualified for the Kremlin Cup, where he notched the biggest win of his career, upsetting Roberto Bautista Agut in straight sets in the round of 16. He then lost a tight three-set match to the eventual champion Pablo Carreño Busta.

In November 2016, Bublik announced that he would represent Kazakhstan.

By the end of the year, Bublik's ranking had skyrocketed to No. 205.

=== 2017: Two Challenger titles and top 100 debut ===
After qualifying for the Australian Open, Bublik defeated 16th-seeded Lucas Pouille in his first Grand Slam tournament match.

In February, Bublik won his first Challenger title at the Morelos Open, defeating Nicolás Jarry in the final.

At Wimbledon, Bublik received a spot in the main draw as a lucky loser. He was defeated by world No. 1 Andy Murray in his first Wimbledon appearance.

Bublik won his second Challenger title in Aptos. In September, after making the semifinals of a Challenger tournament in Istanbul, Bublik broke into the top 100 for the first time, reaching a career-high ranking of No. 95.

=== 2018: Struggles with form ===
Bublik struggled for much of the 2018 season, seeing his ranking drop into the 200s. However, he prevailed in his last event of the year, winning eight matches to capture the Challenger title in Bratislava.

=== 2019: Two ATP Finals, top 50 ===
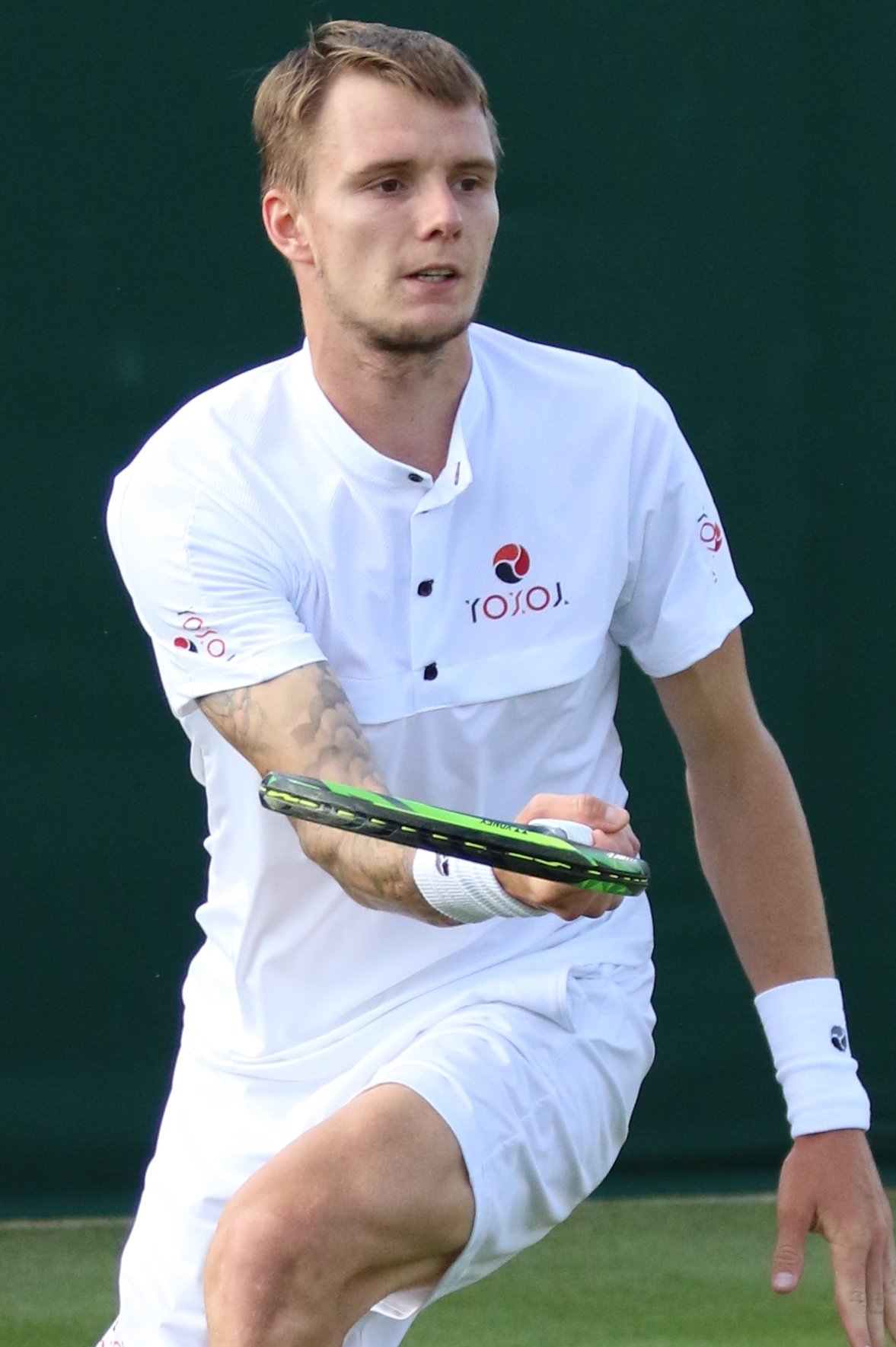
Bublik at the 2019 Wimbledon Championships

Bublik was successful early on in 2019, winning his fourth Challenger title in Budapest, followed shortly by another title at Pau.

Bublik earned his first Masters 1000 win in Miami, winning two qualifying matches and defeating Tennys Sandgren in a third-set tiebreak.

His next tournament was in Monterrey, where he again defeated Sandgren in a third-set tiebreak en route to his sixth Challenger title. This win propelled Bublik back into the top 100.

Bublik won his first French Open main-draw match over Rudolf Molleker, before losing a close four-set contest to eventual finalist Dominic Thiem.

At the tournament in Newport, Bublik reached his first ATP final, where he was defeated by the top seed John Isner.

Bublik had a successful US Open campaign, where he won two consecutive five-set matches. He came back from two sets to love down against Thomas Fabbiano to reach his first major third round.

Bublik reached his second ATP 250 final of the season in Chengdu, where he defeated top-30 players Taylor Fritz and Grigor Dimitrov, before losing the final in a third-set tiebreak to Pablo Carreño Busta. The result helped him to reach a new career-high of No. 48 in November.

=== 2020: Major doubles semifinal, top 10 singles win ===
At the 2020 Australian Open Bublik reached his first semifinal at a major in doubles partnering fellow Kazakh Mikhail Kukushkin where they lost to Rajeev Ram/Joe Salisbury.

Bublik reached the semifinals of Marseille, where he lost to Stefanos Tsitsipas in straight sets. As a lucky loser, Bublik reached the quarterfinals of Hamburg, beating Albert Ramos Viñolas and Félix Auger-Aliassime, before losing to Cristian Garín in 3 sets.

He had his first top-10 victory against Gaël Monfils at the 2020 French Open, but lost to Lorenzo Sonego in the second round.

=== 2021: Historic French Open doubles final, ATP singles finals & top 35 ===
Bublik started his 2021 season at the Antalya Open. Seeded eighth, he reached his third ATP 250 final, notching his second top-10 victory against top seed and world No. 10, Matteo Berrettini, in the quarterfinals. He was forced to retire in the final after trailing 0–2 in the first set against Alex de Minaur.

In the Great Ocean Road Open, he lost in the third round to Stefano Travaglia. At the Australian Open, he lost in the second round to Dušan Lajović in 4 sets.

He reached his fourth final in Singapore after beating Altuğ Çelikbilek, Yoshihito Nishioka and Radu Albot. He lost to Alexei Popyrin in the final.

At the 2021 Miami Open, Bublik reached the quarterfinals where he lost to Jannik Sinner. This marked his best result at a Masters 1000 event to date.

At the 2021 Madrid Open, he defeated Denis Shapovalov and Aslan Karatsev to equal his previous Masters 1000 result, but lost to Casper Ruud. As a result, he achieved his career-high ranking of World No. 40 on 10 May 2021.

In only his sixth appearance at a major in doubles, Bublik reached his second major doubles semifinal in his career at the 2021 French Open partnering with fellow Kazakh Andrey Golubev defeating No. 5 seeded Ivan Dodig/Filip Polášek (second round), No. 11 seeded Wesley Koolhof/Jean-Julien Rojer (third round) and Hugo Nys/Tim Pütz (quarterfinals) en route, his best showing at this major. In the semifinal the Kazakh duo defeated the Spanish duo Pablo Andújar/Pedro Martínez who were both making their major semifinals doubles debut. They played in the final against the French home favorites Nicolas Mahut/Pierre-Hugues Herbert, but they lost in three sets. As a result, he entered the top 50 in doubles at World No. 49 on 14 June 2021.

=== 2022: First ATP singles title ===
Bublik started his 2022 season at the Adelaide International 2. Seeded sixth, he lost in the first round to Australian wildcard Aleksandar Vukic. At the Australian Open, he was defeated in the second round by 17th seed and world No. 20, Gaël Monfils.

In February, Bublik reached his fifth ATP singles final at the Open Sud de France in Montpellier. Seeded sixth, he defeated Tallon Griekspoor, qualifier Pierre-Hugues Herbert, second seed Roberto Bautista Agut, and fifth seed Filip Krajinović en route to the final. In the final, he defeated top seed and world No. 3, Alexander Zverev, to earn his first career win over a top-five player, as well as his first ATP singles title. At the Rotterdam Open, he was eliminated from the tournament in the first round by Andy Murray. Seeded seventh at the Qatar ExxonMobil Open, he lost in the second round to Arthur Rinderknech. In Dubai, he was beaten in the first round by fifth seed and world No. 11, Hubert Hurkacz. Representing Kazakhstan in the Davis Cup tie against Norway, he won both of his matches by beating Viktor Durasovic and world No. 8 Casper Ruud. In the end, Kazakhstan won the tie over Norway 3–1 to reach the Davis Cup Finals. Seeded 31st at the Indian Wells Masters, he beat 2009 finalist and former world No. 1, Andy Murray, in the second round. He lost in the third round to 33rd seed and last year semifinalist, Grigor Dimitrov. Seeded 30th at the Miami Open, he was defeated in the third round by sixth seed, world No. 8, and eventual finalist, Casper Ruud.

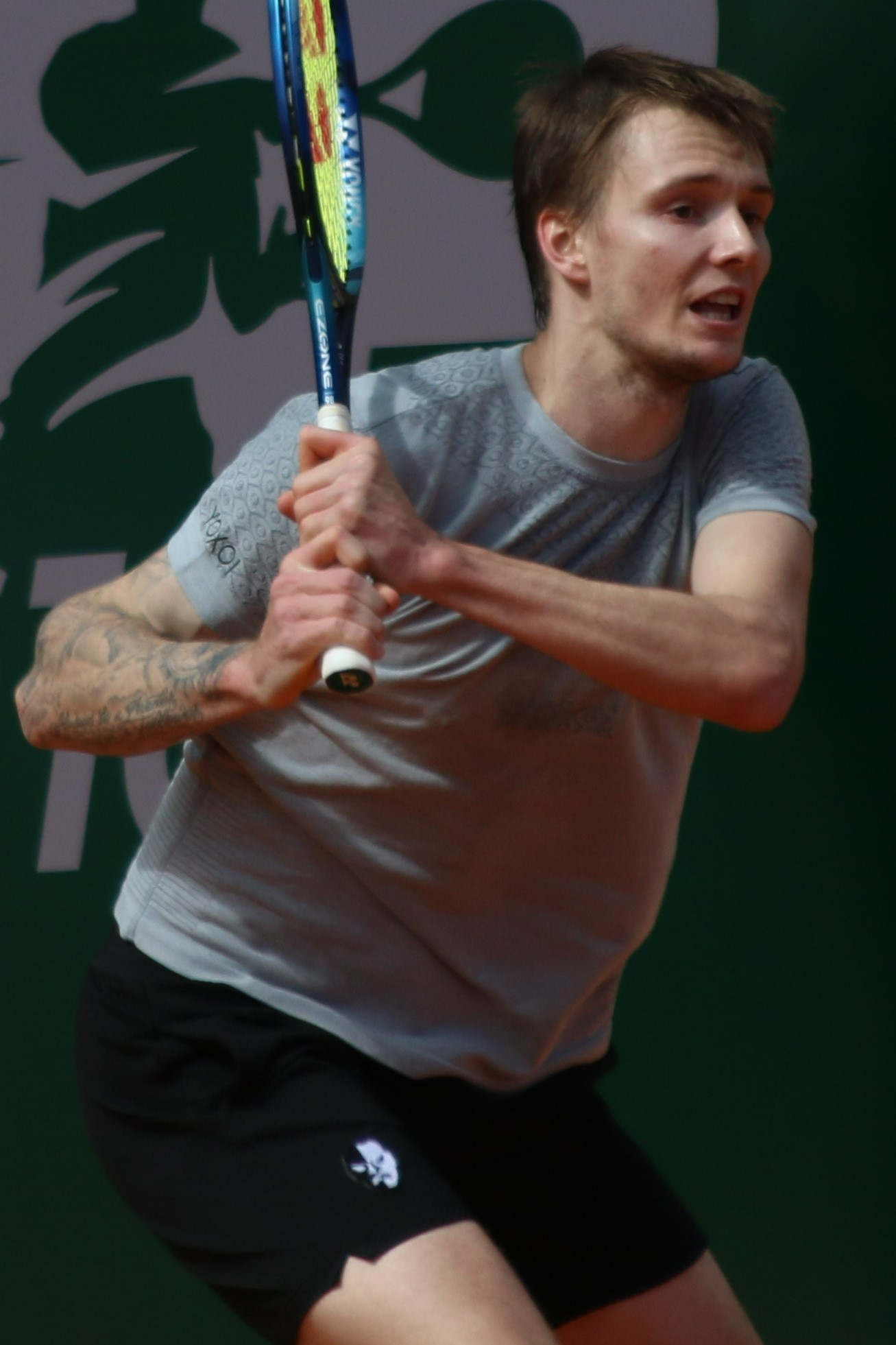
Bublik at the 2022 Monte-Carlo Masters

Bublik started his clay-court season at the Monte-Carlo Masters. He beat 2014 champion, Stan Wawrinka, in the first round for his first win at this event. He retired during his second-round match against 13th seed and world No. 19, Pablo Carreño Busta, for no obvious reason. Seeded 16th at the Barcelona Open, he was beaten in the second round by Emil Ruusuvuori. Last year quarterfinalist at the Madrid Open, he lost in the first round to Miomir Kecmanović. Due to not defending his quarterfinalist points from last year, Bublik's ranking fell from 33 to 41. In Rome, he was defeated in the first round by lucky loser Marcos Giron. Seeded eighth at the Geneva Open, he lost in the first round to Kamil Majchrzak. At the French Open, he lost his second-round match to 28th seed, Miomir Kecmanović, in four sets.

Bublik started his grass-court season at the BOSS Open in Stuttgart. Seeded seventh, he lost in the second round to eventual finalist, Andy Murray. At the Queen's Club Championships, he was defeated in the second round by seventh seed, world No. 17, and two-time champion, Marin Čilić. In Eastbourne, he beat seventh seed, Frances Tiafoe, in the first round. He was eliminated in the quarterfinals by third seed, world No. 14, 2019 champion, and eventual champion, Taylor Fritz. At Wimbledon, he reached the third round where he lost to 23rd seed and world No. 28, Frances Tiafoe, in four sets.

After Wimbledon, Bublik competed at the Hall of Fame Open. Seeded third, he beat sixth seed, Andy Murray, in the quarterfinals. He then defeated Jason Kubler in the semifinals to reach his sixth ATP singles final, his second ATP singles final of the year, and his second Hall of Fame Open final. He lost in a thrilling final to fourth seed Maxime Cressy.

In August, Bublik played at the National Bank Open. He lost in the first round to Jenson Brooksby. Bublik then missed the Western & Southern Open, and the Winston-Salem Open due to the birth of his son Vasily. Returning to action at the US Open, he was defeated in the second round by 12th seed, world No. 15, and two-time semifinalist, Pablo Carreño Busta.

In October at the first edition of the Firenze Open, he defeated in the first round Cristian Garín for his 100th career match win. He was the second man representing Kazakhstan to record 100 tour-level wins in his career, after Mikhail Kukushkin, who had 172.

=== 2023: First ATP 500 title, top 25 ===
Bublik started his 2023 season by representing Kazakhstan at the first edition of the United Cup. Kazakhstan was in Group B alongside Switzerland and Poland. Against Switzerland, he lost to Stan Wawrinka. Against Poland, he was defeated by Hubert Hurkacz in three sets. In the end, Kazakhstan ended third in Group B. Seeded fifth at the ASB Classic in Auckland, he lost in the first round to David Goffin. At the Australian Open, he pushed 30th seed and world No. 32, Alejandro Davidovich Fokina, to five sets, but he ended up losing his first-round match.

After the Australian Open, Bublik represented Kazakhstan in the Davis Cup tie against Chile. He lost both of his matches to Nicolás Jarry and Cristian Garín. In the end, Chile won the tie over Kazakhstan 3–1. Seeded sixth and defending champion at the Open Sud de France, he was defeated in a dramatic first-round match by Grégoire Barrère. In Rotterdam, he lost in the first round to doubles partner Stan Wawrinka. In doubles, he and Wawrinka upset second seeded team Nikola Mektić/Mate Pavić in the first round. They lost in their quarterfinal match to Belgian qualifiers Sander Gillé/Joran Vliegen. At the Open 13 Provence, he beat fourth seed and world No. 25, Grigor Dimitrov, in the quarterfinals in three sets; he saved two match points in the third set tie-breaker. He lost in the semifinals to top seed and world No. 11, Hubert Hurkacz, who would end up winning the tournament. At the Dubai Championships, he was beaten in the second round by third seed, world No. 7, and eventual champion, Daniil Medvedev. During the week of 6 March, Bublik competed at the BNP Paribas Open. He lost in the first round to qualifier Wu Tung-lin. Seeded fourth at the Arizona Classic, he ousted defending champion, Denis Kudla, in the first round. He reached the quarterfinals where he lost to qualifier Jan-Lennard Struff. In Miami, he was defeated in the first round by J. J. Wolf.

Bublik started his clay-court season at the Monte-Carlo Masters. He fell in the first round to 13th seed and world No. 16, Alexander Zverev, in three sets. This was his first loss to Zverev after having led their Head to Head rivalry 2–0. In Barcelona, he lost in the first round to Emil Ruusuvuori. At the Madrid Open, he beat Daniel Elahi Galán in the first round after playing in the longest tie-break of the season so far. In the second round, he lost to sixth seed and world No. 7, Holger Rune, in three sets, despite having match point at 8–7 in the third set tie-break. Seeded sixth at the Open Aix Provence, he made it to the quarterfinals where he was defeated by French lucky loser Harold Mayot. In Rome, he reached the third round where he lost to world No. 4, Casper Ruud, in three sets. At the Geneva Open, he was eliminated in the first round by Marcos Giron.

In Halle, Bublik kicked off his grass court season with an upset over seventh seed Borna Ćorić, crushing Coric in straight sets. Bublik then emerged victorious in a close-fought hard three set win over Madrid Open finalist Jan-Lennard Struff, to reach the quarterfinals. Bublik, in the quarterfinals, defeated Jannik Sinner by a second set retirement after he had won a riveting first set to reach the semifinals of an ATP 500 for the first time in his career. He then defeated Alexander Zverev and reached the biggest final of his career. There Bublik played against third seed Andrey Rublev, with whom he had an 0–3 head-to-head record. Bublik sealed a thrilling three set victory to close out on the biggest title of his career and become the first Kazakh to win an ATP 500 singles title since Andrey Golubev's ATP World Tour 500 series title in 2010, in Hamburg. As a result, Bublik soared 22 spots in the rankings to No. 26, his career highest singles ranking on 26 June 2023. He further reached a new career-high in the top 25 on 31 July 2023.

Bublik received a code violation in the 2023 US Open for smashing his racket in a game against Dominic Thiem. He was criticized by the tennis community and fans when he was recorded saying "I am sick of giving careers back to disabled people" in Russian, an apparent reference to Thiem's recent recovery from injuries.

=== 2024: Fourth ATP title, ATP 500 final ===
Bublik began his 2024 campaign at the Adelaide International ATP 250 event in January. He beat James Mcabe, Dan Evans, and 25th-ranked Lorenzo Musetti on his way to the semi-final, where he was beaten by Jack Draper in two sets. Bublik would suffer a surprise upset at the Australian Open 1st round where he lost to 137th ranked qualifier, Sumit Nagal in straight sets. Following this Bublik competed at the Open Sud de France in Montpellier which he had previously won in 2022. Bublik won the tournament claiming his fourth ATP singles title, defeating Denis Shapovalov, Alexander Shevchenko, Félix Auger-Aliassime and Borna Ćorić. Bublik lost the opening set in all four of his matches making him the only player to win an ATP singles tournament having lost the opening set of each match.

At the Dubai Championships Bublik was victorious in two close matches, first against Tomáš Macháč in the round of 32 then against 28th ranked, Tallon Griekspoor in the round of 16. In the quarter final his opponent Jiří Lehečka would retire after trailing in the second set. Bublik next faced world number 5, Andrey Rublev in the semi-final. In a closely fought match Rublev won the first set in a tie-break, despite Bublik having led at the beginning of the set. In the second set Bublik won in another tie-break. In the final set after Bublik held serve, Rublev shouted in the face of a line judge resulting in him being defaulted for unsportsmanlike conduct. As a result Bublik went through to the final where he faced Ugo Humbert. Bublik lost the final having been broken twice. Bublik received media attention after giving his racket to a ball kid in the middle of a match at the Monte Carlo Masters. He would go on to suffer a heavy defeat to Borna Ćorić losing in straight sets in the round of 32. In the following tournament at the Madrid Open, Bublik beat world number 15, Ben Shelton on his less favoured surface. Bublik would subsequently lose to Daniil Medvedev in the round of 16. Bublik reached a new career-high singles ranking of world No. 17 on 6 May 2025

At the Lyon Open ATP 250 event in May, Bublik reached the semi-final where he lost to newcomer and eventual champion Giovanni Mpetshi Perricard. Bublik went out in the straight sets at the second round of the French Open against Jan-Lennard Struff. At Wimbledon Bublik won in the opening round against Jakub Menšík after having lost the opening two sets. He then beat Arthur Cazaux in straight sets to reach the third round. Bublik would lose to world number 13 Tommy Paul in straight sets in the third round losing in three sets.

Bublik had a poor second half of the season, losing nine of his eleven matches from the Paris Olympics until the end of the season. This resulted in Bublik dropping from his career high ranking of No. 17 to No. 33.

=== 2025: Major quarterfinal, World No. 1 win, four titles, top 15 ===
Bublik continued his poor form from 2024 into the start of the 2025 season, losing eight of his first ten matches including a defeat at Indian wells to then no. 349 ranked Yosuke Watanuki, seeing his ranking drop to no.82 his lowest ranking since 2019. After his early exit at Indian wells, at the suggestion of his coach Bublik spent three days in Las Vegas on a road trip where he also made changes to his game such as switching his racquet eventually arriving at the Arizona tennis classic Challenger event just a few hours before his opening match. Bublik would go onto make the final losing to Joao Fonseca 7-6, 7-6. Bublik's form would continue to improve securing his first top 10 win since February 2024, beating world number 8 Andrey Rublev 6-4, 0-6, 6-4 at the Madrid open.

At the 2025 French Open after a comfortable opening round victory against James Duckworth, Bublik faced world no. 9, Alex de Minaur in the second round. After trailing by two sets Bublik would secure a stunning comeback winning 2-6, 2-6, 6-4, 6-3, 6-2. After defeating Henrique Rocha in the third round Bublik then faced fifth seed Jack Draper in the round of 16. After a late break in the opening set securing the first set for Draper, Bublik would go on to thoroughly outplay Draper with a mixture of pinpoint serving, destructive shotmaking off both wings and most strikingly a series of dropshot winners, winning the match 5-7, 6-3, 6-2, 6-4. Bublik would end the match with 68 winners compared to Draper's 37, including 12 dropshot winners. Bublik became the first man from Kazakhstan to reach a Grand Slam tournament singles quarterfinal, where he lost to Jannik Sinner in straight sets.

In June, Bublik won his second 2025 Halle Open title. He reached the quarterfinals after upsetting defending champion world No. 1 Jannik Sinner in three sets, for the biggest win in his career. He then defeated Tomáš Macháč, Karen Khachanov and Daniil Medvedev to win the title. As a result he returned to the top 30 on 23 June 2025. Seeded 28th at the 2025 Wimbledon Championships, Bublik lost in the first round to Jaume Munar in five sets.

In July, Bublik won two back-to-back titles on clay, first at the Swiss Open Gstaad and the following week at the Generali Open Kitzbühel. His two titles saw him end the 2025 clay season on a win rate of 16-5 (76.2%) a significant increase over his previous seasons. In September, Bublik reached the fourth round of the US Open, where he lost to Jannik Sinner in straight sets. Bublik won his fourth title of the season at the 2025 Hangzhou Open. He joined world No. 1 Carlos Alcaraz (7 titles) as the only men with four or more trophies in 2025. As a result, he reached a career-high ranking of world No. 16 on 22 September 2025.

In October Bublik made the quarter-finals of the Vienna open losing to Jannik Sinner 4-6, 4-6. Bublik next tournament was the Paris masters where he would defeat world no. 4 Taylor Fritz and no. 6 Alex de Minaur on route to the semi-final his best result at a ATP Masters 1000 event, losing to Felix Auger-Aliassime 6-7, 4-6.

Bublik finished his best season as first alternate at the 2025 ATP Finals and at his best career singles ranking of world No. 11 on 10 November 2025.

=== 2026: Ninth title, 200th win, Top 10 debut ===
Bublik started off his season at the Hong Kong Open, where he reached the final and defeated top seed Lorenzo Musetti in straight sets to win the title and enter the Top 10 as a result on 11 January 2026. It was his ninth ATP Tour title. Bublik became the first man representing Kazakhstan to be ranked inside the Top 10 in ATP rankings history.

At the Australian Open, he recorded wins over Jenson Brooksby, Márton Fucsovics and Tomás Martín Etcheverry to reach the fourth round at this major for the first time, at which point he lost to sixth seed Alex de Minaur.

Seeded third at the Rotterdam Open in February, Bublik defeated Hubert Hurkacz and Jan-Lennard Struff, before overcoming Jaume Munar to register his 200th ATP Tour match win and move into the quarterfinals, where he lost to second seed Félix Auger-Aliassime.

In April at the Monte-Carlo Masters, a bye as eighth seed followed by wins over wildcard entrant Gaël Monfils and 11th seed Jiří Lehečka saw him advance to the quarterfinals, at which stage his run was ended by world No. 1 Carlos Alcaraz.

At the French open, Bublik was upset in the opening round losing to Jan-Lennard Struff 5-7, 7-6, 4-6, 5-7. Bublik would face Struff once again at his next tournament, the Stuggart Open this time securing a victory. He would then defeat big server Giovanni Mpetshi Perricard before losing to Taylor Fritz in the semi-finals.

Seeded 10th at Wimbledon, Bublik came through a tough five-set battle against Thanasi Kokkinakis in the opening round before defeating Kyrian Jacquet to reach the third round. His third round match against Frances Tiafoe would last over four hours with Bublik winning 4-6, 7-6, 7-6, 4-6, 6-3. The match was dominated by both players serves with Bublik producing 48 aces and averaging 86% first serve points won compared to 76% for Tiafoe. Bublik would lose in straight sets to Taylor Fritz in the round of 16.

Bublik lost in the opening round of the Swiss open Gstaad before reaching the final of the Generali open Kitzbuhel losing to Quentin Halys 4-6, 6-7. This marked a regression from his clay court season performance in 2025, with his win rate on clay dropping to 8-8 (50%) in 2026.

Bublik skipped the two ATP Masters events during the North American swing to spend time with his family. At his next tournament at the US open, Bublik made the third round where he lost in a rematch from last year to Tommy Paul in five sets. Bublik would make his inaugural appearance for team world at the Laver cup the following month in London where team Europe won 13-5.

== National representation ==
=== Davis Cup ===
Bublik has participated three times in the Kazakhstan Davis Cup team since 2019 and as of 2022, he has a win–loss record of 9–4 in singles and 3–2 in doubles in Davis Cup competition. In 2021, he elaborated on his motivation when playing at the Davis Cup by explaining, "I take Davis Cup more seriously than [the] singles Tour because I'm not only playing for myself, but I play for the country, for the fans, and it's extra." Despite his more sporadic record on the ATP Tour, Bublik reiterated that, "In Davis Cup, I don't have 30 weeks to have good behaviour, bad behaviour, good match or bad match. I think I just go on court and try to be the best now, do what I can do now at the special moment."

He made his Davis Cup debut at the 2019 qualifying round in his singles match against Portugal's João Sousa, where he won in three sets to help Kazakhstan advance to the 2019 Finals. At the Finals, Bublik narrowly lost to Robin Haase of the Netherlands in three sets, but he teamed up with Mikhail Kukushkin to win the deciding doubles match against Haase and Jean-Julien Rojer and seal their first tie win. In Kazakhstan's tie against Great Britain, Bublik played his second singles match, where he defeated Dan Evans, but he lost his doubles match with Kukushkin to Jamie Murray and Neal Skupski. With the loss against Great Britain, Kazakhstan lost in the group stage and thus, ended their campaign.

Bublik played the following year's qualifying round, where they faced off against Netherlands once more. He won his first singles match against Tallon Griekspoor and his second against Haase, both in straight sets, and brought his team through to the 2021 Finals. At the Finals, Bublik took on Sweden's Mikael Ymer and won in three sets to help his team win the tie. He maintained his momentum against Canada's Vasek Pospisil in their next tie to win in straight sets to bring Kazakhstan to its sixth quarterfinal at the Davis Cup. There, Bublik succumbed to Serbia's Novak Djokovic in straight sets and the team ultimately lost its tie to end their campaign.

In 2022, Representing Kazakhstan at the Davis Cup tie versus Norway, he won both of his matches beating Viktor Durasovic and Casper Ruud. In the end, Kazakhstan won the tie over Norway 3–1. After the US Open, Bublik represented Kazakhstan in the Davis Cup Group stage. Kazakhstan is in Group D alongside The Netherlands, the US, and Great Britain. Against the Netherlands, he lost to Botic van de Zandschulp; however, he won the doubles tie with Aleksandr Nedovyesov beating Wesley Koolhof /Matwé Middelkoop. The Netherlands won the tie over Kazakhstan 2–1. Against the US, he lost to Taylor Fritz, but he won doubles again with Nedovyesov defeating Rajeev Ram/Jack Sock. The USA ended up winning the tie 2–1.

=== Olympics ===
At the 2020 Summer Olympics, Bublik made his tennis Olympics debut, where he played Russia's Daniil Medvedev in the first round and lost in straight sets.

== Playing style ==
At 1.96 m (6 ft 5 in), Bublik possesses a powerful serve and led the 2021 ATP Tour in the number of aces served throughout the season. His unpredictable and capricious game style on court has often caught opponents off-guard through his occasional use of the underarm serve and tendency to add trick shots in his matches. His style has drawn comparisons to that of Nick Kyrgios, who also developed a reputation for often playing in an unorthodox manner. Despite having an unorthodox manner, Bublik is a funny guy on court and makes the audience enjoy the match even more.

His powerful serve and groundstrokes make him a particular threat on faster surfaces such as grass and Indoor hard courts on which he has won five of his nine titles. However in recent years he has adapted his playing style to improve his results on clay being more comfortable sliding and making effective use of his dropshot a shot that can be particularly effective on clay.

Bublik is also known for his irreverence to the sport and casual approach to practicing, preferring to treat tennis and his personal life equally. He described his unexpected run to the 2021 French Open doubles final as a "pure accident", and explained that he did not treat doubles as professional tennis, but as a way to "make some extra money, hang around, make some jokes." In a 2020 interview with L'Équipe, Bublik also stated that he lamented the sport and the financial incentives were what kept him going: "If there was no money, I would stop playing tennis instantly. I haven’t earned enough money; in any other case I would have already retired." However, in 2022, he explained the changes to his mindset, saying for Good Morning Tennis that "over time, and it's been three years since that interview, things have changed a lot and [I] love playing tennis now because [I] realized that's what [I] wanted to do as a kid".

== Personal life ==
Bublik and his wife Tatiyana Bublik had their first child, a son, Vasily, in 2022.

In 2023, Bublik was named as a reserve member of the Levitov Chess Wizards team in the Professional Rapid Online Chess League.

== Nationality change ==
In November 2016, Bublik changed his allegiance from that of his home country of Russia’s federation to the tennis federation of Kazakhstan in search of better financial support from the national tennis federation.

Bublik joined several other players by switching to playing for Kazakhstan, explaining:

As hurtful as it may sound, nobody cared about me in Russia. And now people care about me. And they do everything for my career to be successful. That's the most important thing! Kazakhstan Tennis Federation – they really look after me. They help, work, create the conditions for me to play well. It was impossible in Russia. There is also a wonderful tennis center in Astana. I don’t know how to describe it in words. But it's awesome. Since we have already made a decision to play for Kazakhstan, I am never going back to the Russian team [like Ksenia Pervak]. I am not going back.

== Performance timelines ==
Key
W	F	SF	QF	#R	RR	Q#	P#	DNQ	A	Z#	PO	G	S	B	NMS	NTI	P	NH

(W) winner; (F) finalist; (SF) semifinalist; (QF) quarterfinalist; (#R) rounds 4, 3, 2, 1; (RR) round-robin stage; (Q#) qualification round; (P#) preliminary round; (DNQ) did not qualify; (A) absent; (Z#) Davis/Fed Cup Zonal Group (with number indication) or (PO) play-off; (G) gold, (S) silver or (B) bronze Olympic/Paralympic medal; (NMS) not a Masters tournament; (NTI) not a Tier I tournament; (P) postponed; (NH) not held; (SR) strike rate (events won / competed); (W–L) win–loss record.
To avoid confusion and double counting, these charts are updated at the conclusion of a tournament or when the player's participation has ended.

=== Singles ===
Current through the 2026 US Open.

Tournament	2016	2017	2018	2019	2020	2021	2022	2023	2024	2025	2026	SR	W–L	Win %
Grand Slam tournaments
Australian Open	A	2R	Q2	Q1	1R	2R	2R	1R	1R	1R	4R	0 / 8	6–8	43%
French Open	A	Q3	Q1	2R	2R	1R	2R	1R	2R	QF	1R	0 / 8	8–8	50%
Wimbledon	A	1R	Q2	1R	NH	3R	3R	4R	3R	1R	4R	0 / 8	12–8	60%
US Open	A	Q1	A	3R	1R	2R	2R	1R	1R	4R	3R	0 / 7	9–8	50%
Win–loss	0–0	1–2	0–0	3–3	1–3	4–4	5–4	3–4	3–4	7–4	8–4	0 / 31	35–32	52%
Year-end championships
ATP Finals	did not qualify									Alt		0 / 0	0–0	–
National representation
Summer Olympics	A	NH				1R	NH		1R	NH		0 / 2	0–2	0%
Davis Cup	A	A	A	RR	QF		RR	G1	G1	G1		0 / 3	12–9	57%
ATP 1000 tournaments
Indian Wells Open	A	Q2	Q2	A	NH	A	3R	1R	3R	1R	3R	0 / 5	3–5	38%
Miami Open	A	Q1	A	2R	NH	QF	3R	1R	2R	2R	2R	0 / 7	6–7	46%
Monte-Carlo Masters	A	A	A	A	NH	1R	2R	1R	1R	Q1	QF	0 / 5	3–5	38%
Madrid Open	A	A	A	A	NH	QF	1R	2R	4R	4R	2R	0 / 6	9–6	60%
Italian Open	A	A	A	A	1R	1R	1R	3R	2R	2R	3R	0 / 7	4–7	36%
Canadian Open	A	A	A	Q1	NH	2R	1R	1R	1R	A	A	0 / 4	1–4	20%
Cincinnati Open	A	A	A	Q1	1R	2R	A	A	A	A	A	0 / 2	1–2	33%
Shanghai Masters	A	A	A	1R	NH			A	2R	2R		0 / 3	0–3	0%
Paris Masters	A	A	A	Q1	1R	2R	1R	3R	2R	SF		0 / 6	8–6	57%
Win–loss	0–0	0–0	0–0	1–2	0–3	9–7	3–7	5–7	4–8	9–6	4–5	0 / 45	35–45	44%
Career statistics
	2016	2017	2018	2019	2020	2021	2022	2023	2024	2025	2026	Career		
Tournaments	2	3	4	14	16	29	26	26	25	25	17	Career total: 187		
Titles	0	0	0	0	0	0	1	2	1	4	1	Career total: 9		
Finals	0	0	0	2	0	2	3	2	2	4	2	Career total: 17		
Overall win–loss	2–2	3–3	1–4	15–15	14–16	35–30	33–27	24–28	25–25	37–22	26–17	215–189		
Win %	50%	50%	20%	50%	47%	54%	55%	46%	50%	63%	60%	53%		
Year-end ranking	205	117	162	56	50	36	37	32	33	11		$12,660,858		

=== Doubles ===
Tournament	2019	2020	2021	2022	2023	2024	2025	2026	SR	W–L
Grand Slam tournaments
Australian Open	A	SF	3R	1R	1R	A	1R	1R	0 / 6	6–6
French Open	A	1R	F	3R	1R	2R	A	A	0 / 5	8–4
Wimbledon	2R	NH	1R	A	A	1R	1R	1R	0 / 5	1–5
US Open	1R	A	A	2R	A	A	1R		0 / 3	1–3
Win–loss	1–2	4–2	7–3	3–3	0–2	1–1	0–3	0–2	0 / 19	16–18
ATP 1000 tournaments
Indian Wells Open	A	NH	A	A	A	1R	A	1R	0 / 2	0–2
Miami Open	A	NH	1R	1R	2R	1R	A	A	0 / 4	1–4
Monte-Carlo Masters	A	NH	1R	1R	A	1R	A	A	0 / 3	0–3
Madrid Open	A	NH	2R	1R	A	1R	A	2R	0 / 4	2–3
Italian Open	A	A	1R	1R	A	SF	A	1R	0 / 4	3–4
Canadian Open	A	NH	2R	A	1R	2R	A	A	0 / 3	2–3
Cincinnati Open	A	A	1R	A	A	A	A	A	0 / 1	0–1
Shanghai Masters	A	NH			A	1R	A		0 / 1	0–1
Paris Masters	A	A	2R	A	A	A	1R		0 / 2	0–2
Win–loss	0–0	0–0	2–6	0–4	1–2	4–7	0–1	1–3	0 / 24	8–23
Career statistics
	2019	2020	2021	2022	2023	2024	2025	2026	Career	
Titles	0	0	0	0	0	0	0	0	Career total: 0	
Finals	0	0	1	0	0	0	0	0	Career total: 1	
Year-end ranking	309	320	90	48	170	224	117			

== Grand Slam tournaments finals ==
=== Doubles: 1 (runner-up) ===
Result	Year	Tournament	Surface	Partner	Opponents	Score
Loss	2021	French Open	Clay	(Kazakhstan) Andrey Golubev	(France) Pierre-Hugues Herbert (France) Nicolas Mahut	6–4, 6–7^{(1–7)}, 4–6

== Other significant finals ==
=== Asian Games ===
==== Doubles: 1 (silver medal) ====
Result	Date	Tournament	Surface	Partner	Opponents	Score
Silver	2018	Palembang Asian Games, Indonesia	Hard	(Kazakhstan) Denis Yevseyev	(India) Rohan Bopanna (India) Divij Sharan	3–6, 4–6

== ATP Tour finals ==
=== Singles: 17 (9 titles, 8 runner-ups) ===
Legend Grand Slam (–) ATP 1000 (–) ATP 500 (2–1) ATP 250 (7–7)	Finals by surface Hard (5–5) Clay (2–1) Grass (2–2)	Finals by setting Outdoor (6–6) Indoor (3–2)

Result	W–L	Date	Tournament	Tier	Surface	Opponent	Score
Loss	0–1	Jul 2019	Hall of Fame Open, US	ATP 250	Grass	(United States) John Isner	6–7^{(2–7)}, 3–6
Loss	0–2	Sep 2019	Chengdu Open, China	ATP 250	Hard	(Spain) Pablo Carreño Busta	7–6^{(7–5)}, 4–6, 6–7^{(3–7)}
Loss	0–3	Jan 2021	Antalya Open, Turkey	ATP 250	Hard	(Australia) Alex de Minaur	0–2 ret.
Loss	0–4	Feb 2021	Singapore Open, Singapore	ATP 250	Hard (i)	(Australia) Alexei Popyrin	6–4, 0–6, 2–6
Win	1–4	Feb 2022	Open Sud de France, France	ATP 250	Hard (i)	(Germany) Alexander Zverev	6–4, 6–3
Loss	1–5	Jul 2022	Hall of Fame Open, US	ATP 250	Grass	(United States) Maxime Cressy	6–2, 3–6, 6–7^{(3–7)}
Loss	1–6	Sep 2022	Moselle Open, France	ATP 250	Hard (i)	(Italy) Lorenzo Sonego	6–7^{(3–7)}, 2–6
Win	2–6	Jun 2023	Halle Open, Germany	ATP 500	Grass	Andrey Rublev	6–3, 3–6, 6–3
Win	3–6	Oct 2023	European Open, Belgium	ATP 250	Hard (i)	(France) Arthur Fils	6–4, 6–4
Win	4–6	Feb 2024	Open Sud de France, France (2)	ATP 250	Hard (i)	(Croatia) Borna Ćorić	5–7, 6–2, 6–3
Loss	4–7	Mar 2024	Dubai Tennis Championships, UAE	ATP 500	Hard	(France) Ugo Humbert	4–6, 3–6
Win	5–7	Jun 2025	Halle Open, Germany (2)	ATP 500	Grass	Daniil Medvedev	6–3, 7–6^{(7–4)}
Win	6–7	Jul 2025	Swiss Open, Switzerland	ATP 250	Clay	(Argentina) Juan Manuel Cerúndolo	6–4, 4–6, 6–3
Win	7–7	Jul 2025	Generali Open Kitzbühel, Austria	ATP 250	Clay	(France) Arthur Cazaux	6–4, 6–3
Win	8–7	Sep 2025	Hangzhou Open, China	ATP 250	Hard	(France) Valentin Royer	7–6^{(7–4)}, 7–6^{(7–4)}
Win	9–7	Jan 2026	Hong Kong Open, China SAR	ATP 250	Hard	(Italy) Lorenzo Musetti	7–6^{(7–2)}, 6–3
Loss	9–8	Jul 2026	Generali Open Kitzbühel, Austria	ATP 250	Clay	(France) Quentin Halys	4–6, 6–7^{(6–8)}

=== Doubles: 1 (runner-up) ===
Legend Grand Slam (0–1) ATP 1000 (–) ATP 500 (–) ATP 250 (–)	Finals by surface Hard (–) Clay (0–1) Grass (–)	Finals by setting Outdoor (0–1) Indoor (–)

Result	W–L	Date	Tournament	Tier	Surface	Partner	Opponents	Score
Loss	0–1	Jun 2021	French Open, France	Grand Slam	Clay	(Kazakhstan) Andrey Golubev	(France) Pierre-Hugues Herbert (France) Nicolas Mahut	6–4, 6–7^{(1–7)}, 4–6

== ATP Challenger Tour finals ==
=== Singles: 8 (7 titles, 1 runner-up) ===
Finals by surface
Hard (6–1)
Clay (1–0)

Result	W–L	Date	Tournament	Surface	Opponent	Score
Win	1–0	Feb 2017	Morelos Open, Mexico	Hard	(Chile) Nicolás Jarry	7–6^{(7–5)}, 6–4
Win	2–0	Aug 2017	Nordic Naturals Challenger, US	Hard	(United Kingdom) Liam Broady	6–2, 6–3
Win	3–0	Nov 2018	Slovak Open, Slovakia	Hard (i)	(Czech Republic) Lukáš Rosol	6–4, 6–4
Win	4–0	Feb 2019	Hungarian Challenger, Hungary	Hard (i)	(Italy) Roberto Marcora	6–0, 6–3
Win	5–0	Mar 2019	Open Pau–Pyrénées, France	Hard (i)	(Slovakia) Norbert Gombos	5–7, 6–3, 6–3
Win	6–0	Apr 2019	Monterrey Challenger, Mexico	Hard	(Ecuador) Emilio Gómez	6–3, 6–2
Loss	6–1	Mar 2025	Arizona Tennis Classic, US	Hard	(Brazil) João Fonseca	6–7^{(5–7)}, 6–7^{(0–7)}
Win	7–1	May 2025	Piemonte Open, Italy	Clay	(China) Bu Yunchaokete	6–3, 6–3

=== Doubles: 1 (runner-up) ===
Result	W–L	Date	Tournament	Surface	Partner	Opponents	Score
Loss	0–1	Aug 2018	Jinan International Open, China	Hard	(Russia) Alexander Pavlioutchenkov	(Chinese Taipei) Hsieh Cheng-peng (Chinese Taipei) Yang Tsung-hua	6–7^{(5–7)}, 6–4, [5–10]

== ITF Tour finals ==
=== Singles: 5 (4 titles, 1 runner-up) ===
Finals by surface
Hard (3–1)
Clay (1–0)

Result	W–L	Date	Tournament	Surface	Opponent	Score
Win	1–0	Apr 2016	F2 Doha, Qatar	Hard	(France) Benjamin Bonzi	7–6^{(7–4)}, 7–6^{(9–7)}
Loss	1–1	Apr 2016	F3 Doha, Qatar	Hard	(France) Tak Khunn Wang	0–6, 6–4, 2–6
Win	2–1	Jun 2016	F1 Moscow, Russia	Clay	(Slovakia) Filip Horanský	6–3, 7–6^{(7–5)}
Win	3–1	Sep 2016	F8 Saint Petersburg, Russia	Hard (i)	(Russia) Aleksandr Vasilenko	6–3, 7–5
Win	4–1	Oct 2016	F5 Falun, Sweden	Hard (i)	(United Kingdom) Edward Corrie	6–4, 6–4

=== Doubles: 6 (3 titles, 3 runner-ups) ===
Finals by surface
Hard (2–0)
Clay (1–2)
Carpet (0–1)

Result	W–L	Date	Tournament	Surface	Partner	Opponents	Score
Loss	0–1	Aug 2014	F6 Kazan, Russia	Clay	(Russia) Roman Safiullin	(Russia) Andrei Levine (Russia) Anton Zaitcev	1–6, 3–6
Win	1–1	Sep 2014	F10 Vsevolozhsk, Russia	Clay	(Russia) Richard Muzaev	(Estonia) Vladimir Ivanov (Belarus) Andrei Vasilevski	6–3, 3–6, [11–9]
Win	2–1	Nov 2014	F4 Tallinn, Estonia	Hard (i)	(Russia) Evgenii Tiurnev	(Spain) Iván Arenas-Gualda (Spain) Jorge Hernando Ruano	6–4, 6–7^{(5–7)}, [10–1]
Loss	2–2	Sep 2015	F7 Vsevolozhsk, Russia	Clay	(Russia) Richard Muzaev	(Ukraine) Denys Molchanov (Belarus) Yaraslav Shyla	2–6, 6–7^{(3–7)}
Win	3–2	Nov 2015	F43 Antalya, Turkey	Hard	(Serbia) Darko Jandrić	(Turkey) Tuna Altuna (Turkey) Cem İlkel	3–6, 6–4, [10–8]
Loss	3–3	Jan 2016	F2 Kaarst, Germany	Carpet (i)	(Poland) Hubert Hurkacz	(Ukraine) Danylo Kalenichenko (Germany) Denis Kaprić	7–6^{(7–2)}, 4–6, [7–10]

== Wins over top 10 players ==
- Bublik has a 16–32 (33.33%) record against players who were, at the time the match was played, ranked in the top 10.

Season	2020	2021	2022	2023	2024	2025	2026	Total
Wins	1	2	3	2	1	6	1	16

#	Player	Rk	Event	Surface	Rd	Score	Rk
2020
1.	(France) Gaël Monfils	9	French Open, France	Clay	1R	6–4, 7–5, 3–6, 6–3	49
2021
2.	(Italy) Matteo Berrettini	10	Antalya Open, Turkey	Hard	QF	7–6^{(8–6)}, 6–4	49
3.	(Germany) Alexander Zverev	7	Rotterdam Open, Netherlands	Hard (i)	1R	7–5, 6–3	43
2022
4.	(Germany) Alexander Zverev	3	Open Sud de France, France	Hard (i)	F	6–4, 6–3	35
5.	(Norway) Casper Ruud	8	Davis Cup Qualifying, Oslo, Norway	Hard (i)	RR	6–4, 5–7, 6–4	32
6.	(United Kingdom) Cameron Norrie	8	Davis Cup, Glasgow, United Kingdom	Hard (i)	GS	6–4, 6–3	44
2023
7.	(Italy) Jannik Sinner	9	Halle Open, Germany	Grass	QF	7–5, 2–0 ret.	48
8.	Andrey Rublev	7	Halle Open, Germany	Grass	F	6–3, 3–6, 6–3	48
2024
9.	Andrey Rublev	5	Dubai Tennis Championships, UAE	Hard	SF	6–7^{(4–7)}, 7–6^{(7–5)}, 6–5 def.	23
2025
10.	Andrey Rublev	8	Madrid Open, Spain	Clay	3R	6–4, 0–6, 6–4	75
11.	(Australia) Alex de Minaur	9	French Open, France	Clay	2R	2–6, 2–6, 6–4, 6–3, 6–2	62
12.	(United Kingdom) Jack Draper	5	French Open, France	Clay	4R	5–7, 6–3, 6–2, 6–4	62
13.	(Italy) Jannik Sinner	1	Halle Open, Germany	Grass	2R	3–6, 6–3, 6–4	45
14.	(United States) Taylor Fritz	4	Paris Masters, France	Hard (i)	3R	7–6^{(7–5)}, 6–2	16
15.	(Australia) Alex de Minaur	6	Paris Masters, France	Hard (i)	QF	6–7^{(5–7)}, 6–4, 7–5	16
2026
16.	(Italy) Lorenzo Musetti	7	Hong Kong Open, China SAR	Hard	F	7–6^{(7–2)}, 6–3	11

- Key: (Rk) first use, opponent rank; (Rd) round; (Rk) 2nd use, player rank; (Ref) reference; (F) final; (SF) semifinal; (QF) quarterfinal; (#R) rounds 4, 3, 2, 1; (RR) round-robin stage; (Q#) qualifying rounds or stages (3), 2, 1.

*As of 11 January 2026
