= Arizona Tennis Classic =

- 2026 Arizona Tennis Classic

ATP Challenger Tour
- Event name: Arizona Tennis Classic
- Location: Phoenix, Arizona, United States
- Venue: Phoenix Country Club
- Category: ATP Challenger Tour 175
- Surface: Hard
- Draw: 48S/4Q/16D
- Prize money: $300,000
- Website: Website

Current champions (2026)
- Singles: (United States) Ethan Quinn
- Doubles: (Ecuador) Diego Hidalgo (United States) Patrik Trhac

The Arizona Tennis Classic is a professional tennis tournament played on hardcourts. The tournament is part of the ATP Challenger Tour 175 and has been held annually in Phoenix, Arizona, since 2019, with breaks in 2020 and 2021 due to COVID-19. Known also as the Phoenix Challenger, it is renowned for having one of the strongest draws in the Challenger circuit, featuring top 50 players. Since 2019, the tournament has been held at the Phoenix Country Club, featuring three primary courts, including a new multi-level grandstand that was added in 2024 and 2025. The Arizona Tennis Classic was the first of now six ATP Challenger Tour 175 tournaments.

== Past finals ==
=== Singles ===
Year	Champion	Runner-up	Score
2019	(Italy) Matteo Berrettini	(Kazakhstan) Mikhail Kukushkin	3–6, 7–6^{(8–6)}, 7–6^{(7–2)}
2020	cancelled due to coronavirus pandemic		
2021	Not held		
2022	(United States) Denis Kudla	(Germany) Daniel Altmaier	2–6, 6–2, 6–3
2023	(Portugal) Nuno Borges	Alexander Shevchenko	4–6, 6–2, 6–1
2024	(Portugal) Nuno Borges (2)	(Italy) Matteo Berrettini	7–5, 7–6^{(7–4)}
2025	(Brazil) João Fonseca	(Kazakhstan) Alexander Bublik	7–6^{(7–5)}, 7–6^{(7–0)}
2026	(United States) Ethan Quinn	(United States) Marcos Giron	7–6^{(7–1)}, 4–6, 7–5

=== Doubles ===
Year	Champions	Runners-up	Score
2019	(United Kingdom) Jamie Murray (United Kingdom) Neal Skupski	(United States) Austin Krajicek (New Zealand) Artem Sitak	6–7^{(2–7)}, 7–5, [10–6]
2020	cancelled due to coronavirus pandemic		
2021	Not held		
2022	(Philippines) Treat Huey (United States) Denis Kudla	(Germany) Oscar Otte (Germany) Jan-Lennard Struff	7–6^{(12–10)}, 3–6, [10–6]
2023	(United States) Nathaniel Lammons (United States) Jackson Withrow	(Monaco) Hugo Nys (Poland) Jan Zieliński	6–7^{(1–7)}, 6–4, [10–8]
2024	(France) Sadio Doumbia (France) Fabien Reboul	(Australia) Rinky Hijikata (United Kingdom) Henry Patten	6–3, 6–2
2025	(Spain) Marcel Granollers (Argentina) Horacio Zeballos	(United States) Austin Krajicek (United States) Rajeev Ram	6–3, 7–6^{(7–2)}
2026	(Ecuador) Diego Hidalgo (United States) Patrik Trhac	(Monaco) Hugo Nys (France) Édouard Roger-Vasselin	6–7^{(6–8)}, 6–3, [10–4]
