= 2025 Mallorca Championships =

- Date: 22–28 June
- Edition: 5th
- Category: ATP 250 tournaments
- Draw: 28S / 16D
- Surface: Grass
- Location: Santa Ponsa, Spain
- Venue: Santa Ponsa Tennis Academy

Champions

Singles
- (Netherlands) Tallon Griekspoor

Doubles
- (Mexico) Santiago González / (United States) Austin Krajicek
- Mallorca Championships

The 2025 Mallorca Championships presented by ecotrans was a men's tennis tournament played on outdoor grass courts. It was the fifth edition of the Mallorca Championships, and part of the ATP 250 tournaments of the 2025 ATP Tour. It took place at the Santa Ponsa Tennis Academy in Santa Ponsa, Spain, from 22 to 28 June 2025.

== Champions ==
=== Singles ===
- (Netherlands) Tallon Griekspoor defeated (France) Corentin Moutet, 7–5, 7–6^{(7–3)}

=== Doubles ===
- (Mexico) Santiago González / (United States) Austin Krajicek defeated (India) Yuki Bhambri / (United States) Robert Galloway, 6−1, 1−6, [15−13]

== Singles main draw entrants ==
=== Seeds ===
Country	Player	Rank^{1}	Seed
USA	Ben Shelton	10	1
CAN	Félix Auger-Aliassime	27	2
USA	Alex Michelsen	33	3
NED	Tallon Griekspoor	35	4
FRA	Alexandre Müller	40	5
CAN	Gabriel Diallo	44	6
ESP	Roberto Bautista Agut	51	7
GER	Daniel Altmaier	52	8

- ^{1} Rankings are as of 16 June 2025.

=== Other entrants ===
The following players received wildcards into the main draw:

- (Germany) Justin Engel
- (Italy) Fabio Fognini
- (Australia) Rinky Hijikata

The following players received entry from the qualifying draw:

- (United States) Nishesh Basavareddy
- (United States) Brandon Holt
- (United States) Ethan Quinn
- (Australia) Bernard Tomic

=== Withdrawals ===
- (France) Gaël Monfils → replaced by (Bosnia and Herzegovina) Damir Džumhur
- (Japan) Kei Nishikori → replaced by (Germany) Daniel Altmaier
- (Norway) Casper Ruud → replaced by (Serbia) Hamad Medjedovic
- (Chile) Alejandro Tabilo → replaced by (United States) Learner Tien
- (Australia) Jordan Thompson → replaced by (China) Bu Yunchaokete

== Doubles main draw entrants ==
=== Seeds ===
Country	Player	Country	Player	Rank^{1}	Seed
ITA	Simone Bolelli	ITA	Andrea Vavassori	25	1
FRA	Sadio Doumbia	FRA	Fabien Reboul	48	2
ARG	Máximo González	ARG	Andrés Molteni	54	3
IND	Yuki Bhambri	USA	Robert Galloway	71	4

- ^{1} Rankings are as of 16 June 2025.

=== Other entrants ===
The following pairs received wildcards into the doubles main draw:

- (Germany) Justin Engel / (Germany) Andreas Mies
- (Spain) Pedro Martínez / (Spain) Jaume Munar
