= 2025 Mallorca Championships – Singles =

Singles
- 2025 Mallorca Championships

Final
- Champion: (Netherlands) Tallon Griekspoor
- Runner-up: (France) Corentin Moutet
- Score: 7–5, 7–6^{(7–3)}

Details
- Draw: 28
- Seeds: 8

Events
| Singles | Doubles |
| ← 2024 · | Mallorca Championships | · 2026 → |

Tallon Griekspoor defeated Corentin Moutet in the final, 7–5, 7–6^{(7–3)} to win the singles tennis title at the 2025 Mallorca Championships. He did not lose a set en route to his third ATP Tour singles title.

Alejandro Tabilo was the reigning champion, but withdrew before the tournament began.

== Seeds ==
The top four seeds received a bye into the second round.

1. (United States) Ben Shelton (second round)
2. (Canada) Félix Auger-Aliassime (semifinals)
3. (United States) Alex Michelsen (semifinals)
4. (Netherlands) Tallon Griekspoor (champion)
5. (France) Alexandre Müller (first round)
6. (Canada) Gabriel Diallo (quarterfinals)
7. (Spain) Roberto Bautista Agut (quarterfinals)
8. (Germany) Daniel Altmaier (second round)

== Draw ==
=== Key ===
- Q = Qualifier
- WC = Wild card
- LL = Lucky loser
- Alt = Alternate
- ITF = ITF entry
- PR = Protected ranking
- SR = Special ranking
- SE = Special exempt
- JE = Junior exempt
- JR = Junior Accelerator Programme entrant
- CO = College Accelerator Programme entrant
- NG = Next Gen Accelerator Program entrant
- w/o = Walkover
- r = Retired
- d = Defaulted

=== Finals ===
Semifinals
(France) Corentin Moutet | 6 | 7^{7}
3 | (United States) Alex Michelsen | 4 | 6^{3}
4 | (Netherlands) Tallon Griekspoor | 6 | 6
2 | (Canada) Félix Auger-Aliassime | 4 | 4

Final
(France) Corentin Moutet | 5 | 6^{3}
4 | (Netherlands) Tallon Griekspoor | 7 | 7^{7}

=== Top half ===
First round
(United States) L Tien | 6 | 6
WC | (Germany) J Engel | 4 | 4
(Spain) P Martínez | 6 | 3 | 0
(France) C Moutet | 4 | 6 | 6
WC | (Italy) F Fognini | 3 | 6 | 3
8 | (Germany) D Altmaier | 6 | 3 | 6
(France) B Bonzi | 6 | 4 | 4
Q | (United States) B Holt | 2 | 6 | 6
Q | (Australia) B Tomic | 3 | 7 | 6
WC | (Australia) R Hijikata | 6 | 5 | 2
(Argentina) TM Etcheverry | 7 | 3 | 2
7 | (Spain) R Bautista Agut | 5 | 6 | 6

Second round
1 | (United States) B Shelton | 4 | 6^{2}
(United States) L Tien | 6 | 7^{7}
(France) C Moutet | 7^{7} | 7^{7}
8 | (Germany) D Altmaier | 6^{3} | 6^{3}
3 | (United States) A Michelsen | 6 | 6
Q | (United States) B Holt | 4 | 4
Q | (Australia) B Tomic | 3 | 3
7 | (Spain) R Bautista Agut | 6 | 6

Quarterfinals
(United States) L Tien | 2 | 5
(France) C Moutet | 6 | 7
3 | (United States) A Michelsen | 6 | 7^{7}
7 | (Spain) R Bautista Agut | 4 | 6^{4}

Semifinals
(France) C Moutet | 6 | 7^{7}
3 | (United States) A Michelsen | 4 | 6^{3}

=== Bottom half ===
First round
6 | (Canada) G Diallo | 7 | 6
(Spain) J Munar | 5 | 3
(China) Y Bu | 4 | 4
(Serbia) L Djere | 6 | 6
(Argentina) C Ugo Carabelli | 3 | 2
Q | (United States) E Quinn | 6 | 6
5 | (France) A Müller | 6^{5} | 5
R Safiullin | 7^{7} | 7
Q | (United States) N Basavareddy | 0 | 4
(Serbia) H Medjedovic | 6 | 6
(Bosnia and Herzegovina) D Džumhur | 4 | 6 | 5
(France) A Rinderknech | 6 | 4 | 7

Second round
6 | (Canada) G Diallo | 6 | 3 | 6
(Serbia) L Djere | 3 | 6 | 3
Q | (United States) E Quinn | 5 | 4
4 | (Netherlands) T Griekspoor | 7 | 6
R Safiullin | 4 | 6 | 6^{4}
(Serbia) H Medjedovic | 6 | 3 | 7^{7}
(France) A Rinderknech | 5 | 3
2 | (Canada) F Auger-Aliassime | 7 | 6

Quarterfinals
6 | (Canada) G Diallo | 4 | 4
4 | (Netherlands) T Griekspoor | 6 | 6
(Serbia) H Medjedovic | 6 | 1 | 4
2 | (Canada) F Auger-Aliassime | 3 | 6 | 6

Semifinals
4 | (Netherlands) T Griekspoor | 6 | 6
2 | (Canada) F Auger-Aliassime | 4 | 4

== Qualifying ==
=== Seeds ===
1. (United States) Aleksandar Kovacevic (qualifying competition)
2. (Czech Republic) Vít Kopřiva (qualifying competition)
3. (Australia) Adam Walton (first round)
4. (Argentina) Mariano Navone (qualifying competition)
5. (Netherlands) Botic van de Zandschulp (first round)
6. (Netherlands) Jesper de Jong (first round)
7. (United States) Ethan Quinn (qualified)
8. (Kazakhstan) Alexander Shevchenko (first round)

=== Qualifiers ===
1. (Australia) Bernard Tomic
2. (United States) Ethan Quinn
3. (United States) Brandon Holt
4. (United States) Nishesh Basavareddy

=== Qualifying draw ===
==== First qualifier ====
First round
1 | (United States) Aleksandar Kovacevic | 6 | 6
(France) Sascha Gueymard Wayenburg | 4 | 2
(Australia) Bernard Tomic | 5 | 6 | 6
6 | (Netherlands) Jesper de Jong | 7 | 4 | 4

Qualifying competition
1 | (United States) Aleksandar Kovacevic | 6^{2} | 3
(Australia) Bernard Tomic | 7^{7} | 6

==== Second qualifier ====
First round
2 | (Czech Republic) Vít Kopřiva | 6 | 7
WC | (Greece) Petros Tsitsipas | 3 | 5
WC | (United Kingdom) Oliver Crawford | 6 | 6^{5} | 6^{3}
7 | (United States) Ethan Quinn | 4 | 7^{7} | 7^{7}

Qualifying competition
2 | (Czech Republic) Vít Kopřiva | 7 | 5 | 6^{5}
7 | (United States) Ethan Quinn | 5 | 7 | 7^{7}

==== Third qualifier ====
First round
3 | (Australia) Adam Walton | 3 | 7^{7} | 6^{0}
(United States) Brandon Holt | 6 | 6^{1} | 7^{7}
(Sweden) Elias Ymer | 6 | 7^{7}
8 | (Kazakhstan) Alexander Shevchenko | 4 | 6^{4}

Qualifying competition
(United States) Brandon Holt | 7^{7} | 6
(Sweden) Elias Ymer | 6^{4} | 3

==== Fourth qualifier ====
First round
4 | (Argentina) Mariano Navone | 4 | 7^{8} | 3
(Austria) Sebastian Ofner | 6 | 6^{6} | 1^{r}
(United States) Nishesh Basavareddy | 6 | 6^{5} | 7
5 | (Netherlands) Botic van de Zandschulp | 4 | 7^{7} | 5

Qualifying competition
4 | (Argentina) Mariano Navone | 1 | 4
(United States) Nishesh Basavareddy | 6 | 6
