= 2026 Mallorca Championships – Singles =

Singles
- 2026 Mallorca Championships

Final
- Champion: (Spain) Alejandro Davidovich Fokina
- Runner-up: (United States) Ethan Quinn
- Score: 7–6^{(7–4)}, 6–3

Details
- Draw: 28
- Seeds: 8

Events
Singles	Doubles
- Mallorca Championships

Alejandro Davidovich Fokina defeated Ethan Quinn in the final, 7–6^{(7–4)}, 6–3 to win the singles tennis title at the 2026 Mallorca Championships. It was his first ATP Tour singles title, following five previous runner-up finishes.

Tallon Griekspoor was the reigning champion, but withdrew before the tournament began.

== Seeds ==
The top four seeds received a bye into the second round.

1. (Italy) Luciano Darderi (quarterfinals)
2. (Spain) Alejandro Davidovich Fokina (champion)
3. (United States) Frances Tiafoe (withdrew)
4. (Chile) Alejandro Tabilo (second round)
5. (Peru) Ignacio Buse (second round)
6. (France) Corentin Moutet (first round)
7. (Argentina) Mariano Navone (first round)
8. (France) Adrian Mannarino (first round)

== Draw ==
Key

- Q = Qualifier
- WC = Wild card
- LL = Lucky loser
- Alt = Alternate
- ITF = ITF entry
- PR = Protected ranking
- SR = Special ranking
- SE = Special exempt
- JE = Junior exempt
- JR = Junior Accelerator Programme entrant
- CO = College Accelerator Programme entrant
- NG = Next Gen Accelerator Program entrant
- w/o = Walkover
- r = Retired
- d = Defaulted

=== Finals ===
Semifinals
(Portugal) Nuno Borges	1	2
(United States) Ethan Quinn	6	6
(Hungary) Fábián Marozsán	7	2	4
2	(Spain) Alejandro Davidovich Fokina	5	6	6

Final
(United States) Ethan Quinn	6^{4}	3
2	(Spain) Alejandro Davidovich Fokina	7^{7}	6

=== Top half ===
First round
(Germany) Y Hanfmann	7^{7}	7^{7}
(Paraguay) AD Vallejo	6^{2}	6^{2}
WC	(Germany) J-L Struff	6	1	7
(Spain) M Landaluce	3	6	5
(Portugal) N Borges	6	6
8	(France) A Mannarino	2	2
(United States) E Quinn	6	6
(France) V Royer	4	3
Q	(Bosnia and Herzegovina) D Džumhur	3	4
(Czech Republic) V Kopřiva	6	6
(Greece) S Tsitsipas	6^{4}	3
5	(Peru) I Buse	7^{7}	6

Second round
1	(Italy) L Darderi	7	6
(Germany) Y Hanfmann	5	3
WC	(Germany) J-L Struff	4	5
(Portugal) N Borges	6	7
LL	(United States) M Cassone	3	7^{7}	3
(United States) E Quinn	6	6^{4}	6
(Czech Republic) V Kopřiva	7	6
5	(Peru) I Buse	5	1

Quarterfinals
1	(Italy) L Darderi	6^{1}	4
(Portugal) N Borges	7^{7}	6
(United States) E Quinn	5	7	6
(Czech Republic) V Kopřiva	7	5	3

Semifinals
(Portugal) N Borges	1	2
(United States) E Quinn	6	6

=== Bottom half ===
First round
7	(Argentina) M Navone	6^{2}	6	4
(Italy) L Sonego	7^{7}	2	6
(Serbia) M Kecmanović	2	6	7^{8}
LL	(France) A Ghibaudo	6	3	6^{6}
(Hungary) F Marozsán	2	7^{12}	7^{7}
Q	(Slovakia) A Molčan	6	6^{10}	6^{5}
6	(France) C Moutet	5	4
LL	(Jordan) A Shelbayh	7	6
Q	(Australia) M Polmans	1	6^{3}
WC	(Bulgaria) G Dimitrov	6	7^{7}
Q	(Australia) A Walton	6	6
WC	(Australia) N Kyrgios	3	4

Second round
(Italy) L Sonego	6	6^{4}	4
(Serbia) M Kecmanović	2	7^{7}	6
(Hungary) F Marozsán	6	6
4	(Chile) A Tabilo	2	3
LL	(Jordan) A Shelbayh	2	4
WC	(Bulgaria) G Dimitrov	6	6
Q	(Australia) A Walton	4	5
2	(Spain) A Davidovich Fokina	6	7

Quarterfinals
(Serbia) M Kecmanović	4	3
(Hungary) F Marozsán	6	6
WC	(Bulgaria) G Dimitrov	3	3
2	(Spain) A Davidovich Fokina	6	6

Semifinals
(Hungary) F Marozsán	7	2	4
2	(Spain) A Davidovich Fokina	5	6	6

== Qualifying ==
=== Seeds ===
1. (United States) Zachary Svajda (qualifying competition)
2. (Australia) Adam Walton (qualified)
3. (Kazakhstan) Alexander Shevchenko (first round)
4. (Slovakia) Alex Molčan (qualified)
5. (Bosnia and Herzegovina) Damir Džumhur (qualified)
6. (Spain) Daniel Rincón (withdrew)
7. Petr Bar Biryukov (first round)
8. (United States) Murphy Cassone (qualifying competition, lucky loser)

=== Qualifiers ===
1. (Bosnia and Herzegovina) Damir Džumhur
2. (Australia) Adam Walton
3. (Australia) Marc Polmans
4. (Slovakia) Alex Molčan

=== Lucky losers ===
1. (United States) Murphy Cassone
2. (Jordan) Abdullah Shelbayh
3. (France) Antoine Ghibaudo

=== Qualifying draw ===
==== First qualifier ====
First round
1	(United States) Zachary Svajda	6	6
(Switzerland) Marc-Andrea Hüsler	3	3
(Kazakhstan) Mikhail Kukushkin	2	1
5	(Bosnia and Herzegovina) Damir Džumhur	6	6

Qualifying competition
1	(United States) Zachary Svajda	3	3
5	(Bosnia and Herzegovina) Damir Džumhur	6	6

==== Second qualifier ====
First round
2	(Australia) Adam Walton	6	7
(Italy) Federico Bondioli	1	5
(France) Antoine Ghibaudo	6	6
7	Petr Bar Biryukov	2	4

Qualifying competition
2	(Australia) Adam Walton	6	6
(France) Antoine Ghibaudo	4	1

==== Third qualifier ====
First round
3	(Kazakhstan) Alexander Shevchenko	4	3
(Jordan) Abdullah Shelbayh	6	6
WC	(Germany) Jamie Mackenzie	6^{4}	1
Alt	(Australia) Marc Polmans	7^{7}	6

Qualifying competition
(Jordan) Abdullah Shelbayh	3	6^{4}
Alt	(Australia) Marc Polmans	6	7^{7}

==== Fourth qualifier ====
First round
4	(Slovakia) Alex Molčan	6	6
WC	(Slovenia) Žiga Šeško	2	2
(Italy) Filippo Romano	5	1
8	(United States) Murphy Cassone	7	6

Qualifying competition
4	(Slovakia) Alex Molčan	6	4	6
8	(United States) Murphy Cassone	4	6	4
