= 2025 Mallorca Championships – Doubles =

Doubles
- 2025 Mallorca Championships

Final
- Champions: (Mexico) Santiago González (United States) Austin Krajicek
- Runners-up: (India) Yuki Bhambri (United States) Robert Galloway
- Score: 6−1, 1−6, [15−13]

Details
- Draw: 16
- Seeds: 4

Events
Singles	Doubles
← 2024 ·	Mallorca Championships	· 2026 →

Santiago González and Austin Krajicek defeated defending champion Robert Galloway and his partner Yuki Bhambri in the final, 6–1, 1–6, [15–13] to win the doubles tennis title at the 2025 Mallorca Championships.

Julian Cash and Galloway were the reigning champions, but Cash chose to compete in Eastbourne instead.

== Seeds ==
1. (Italy) Simone Bolelli / (Italy) Andrea Vavassori (first round)
2. (France) Sadio Doumbia / (France) Fabien Reboul (semifinals)
3. (Argentina) Máximo González / (Argentina) Andrés Molteni (quarterfinals)
4. (India) Yuki Bhambri / (United States) Robert Galloway (final)

== Draw ==
=== Key ===
- Q = Qualifier
- WC = Wild card
- LL = Lucky loser
- Alt = Alternate
- ITF = ITF entry
- PR = Protected ranking
- SR = Special ranking
- SE = Special exempt
- JE = Junior exempt
- JR = Junior Accelerator Programme entrant
- CO = College Accelerator Programme entrant
- NG = Next Gen Accelerator Program entrant
- w/o = Walkover
- r = Retired
- d = Defaulted

=== Draw ===
First round
1	(Italy) S Bolelli (Italy) A Vavassori	7^{7}	6^{6}	[9]
(Argentina) G Andreozzi (France) T Arribagé	6^{5}	7^{8}	[11]
(Tunisia) S Mansouri (Croatia) N Mektić	2	6^{5}
(United States) A Michelsen (United States) L Tien	6	7^{7}
4	(India) Y Bhambri (United States) R Galloway	6	6
(France) G Jacq (France) A Müller	3	3
(Brazil) R Matos (Brazil) M Melo	6	7^{7}
(Croatia) I Dodig (Brazil) O Luz	4	6^{3}
(Austria) A Erler (Germany) C Frantzen	4	6^{4}
(Mexico) S González (United States) A Krajicek	6	7^{7}
(Portugal) F Cabral (Austria) L Miedler	6^{5}	4
3	(Argentina) M González (Argentina) A Molteni	7^{7}	6
WC	(Germany) J Engel (Germany) A Mies	4	1
WC	(Spain) P Martínez (Spain) J Munar	6	6
(Monaco) R Arneodo (France) M Guinard	6	3	[9]
2	(France) S Doumbia (France) F Reboul	3	6	[11]

Quarterfinals
(Argentina) G Andreozzi (France) T Arribagé	7^{7}	7
(United States) A Michelsen (United States) L Tien	6^{4}	5
4	(India) Y Bhambri (United States) R Galloway	6	6
(Brazil) R Matos (Brazil) M Melo	2	3
(Mexico) S González (United States) A Krajicek	6^{5}	6	[10]
3	(Argentina) M González (Argentina) A Molteni	7^{7}	4	[5]
WC	(Spain) P Martínez (Spain) J Munar
2	(France) S Doumbia (France) F Reboul	w/o

Semifinals
(Argentina) G Andreozzi (France) T Arribagé	1	6^{4}
4	(India) Y Bhambri (United States) R Galloway	6	7^{7}
(Mexico) S González (United States) A Krajicek	6	7
2	(France) S Doumbia (France) F Reboul	3	5

Final
4	(India) Y Bhambri (United States) R Galloway	1	6	[13]
(Mexico) S González (United States) A Krajicek	6	1	[15]
