= 2024 Mallorca Championships =

- Date: 23–29 June
- Edition: 4th
- Category: ATP 250 tournaments
- Draw: 28S / 16D
- Surface: Grass
- Location: Santa Ponsa, Spain
- Venue: Santa Ponsa Tennis Academy

Champions

Singles
- (Chile) Alejandro Tabilo

Doubles
- (United Kingdom) Julian Cash / (United States) Robert Galloway
- Mallorca Championships

The 2024 Mallorca Championships was a men's tennis tournament played on outdoor grass courts. It was the fourth edition of the Mallorca Championships, and part of the ATP 250 tournaments of the 2024 ATP Tour. It was held at the Santa Ponsa Tennis Academy in Santa Ponsa, Spain, from 23 to 29 June 2024.

== Champions ==
=== Singles ===
- (Chile) Alejandro Tabilo defeated (Austria) Sebastian Ofner, 6–3, 6–4

=== Doubles ===
- (United Kingdom) Julian Cash / (United States) Robert Galloway defeated (Ecuador) Diego Hidalgo / (Chile) Alejandro Tabilo, 6–4, 6–4

== Singles main draw entrants ==
=== Seeds ===
Country	Player	Rank^{1}	Seed
USA	Ben Shelton	14	1
FRA	Ugo Humbert	16	2
FRA	Adrian Mannarino	21	3
CHI	Alejandro Tabilo	24	4
ITA	Luciano Darderi	34	5
FRA	Gaël Monfils	38	6
~~AUS~~	~~Jordan Thompson~~	~~43~~	~~7~~
USA	Christopher Eubanks	44	8

- ^{1} Rankings are as of 17 June 2024.

=== Other entrants ===
The following players received wildcards into the main draw:

- (Spain) Pablo Carreño Busta
- (Italy) Fabio Fognini
- (Austria) Dominic Thiem

The following players received entry from the qualifying draw:

- (United Kingdom) Paul Jubb
- (France) Constant Lestienne
- (Germany) Maximilian Marterer
- (Australia) Adam Walton

The following player received entry as a lucky loser:

- (Netherlands) Gijs Brouwer

=== Withdrawals ===
- (Hungary) Márton Fucsovics → replaced by (Italy) Luca Nardi
- (Netherlands) Tallon Griekspoor → replaced by (Czech Republic) Jakub Menšík
- (Czech Republic) Tomáš Macháč → replaced by (Australia) Rinky Hijikata
- (Australia) Jordan Thompson → replaced by (Netherlands) Gijs Brouwer

== Doubles main draw entrants ==
=== Seeds ===
Country	Player	Country	Player	Rank^{1}	Seed
USA	Nathaniel Lammons	USA	Jackson Withrow	44	1
BEL	Sander Gillé	BEL	Joran Vliegen	58	2
FRA	Sadio Doumbia	FRA	Fabien Reboul	67	3
NED	Robin Haase	ARG	Andrés Molteni	72	4

- ^{1} Rankings are as of 17 June 2024.

=== Other entrants ===
The following pairs received wildcards into the doubles main draw:

- (Jamaica) Dustin Brown / (Germany) Daniel Masur
- (Austria) Lucas Miedler / (Austria) Dominic Thiem

=== Withdrawals ===
- (Uruguay) Ariel Behar / (Czech Republic) Adam Pavlásek ← replaced by (Germany) Constantin Frantzen / (Germany) Hendrik Jebens
- (Austria) Alexander Erler / (Austria) Lucas Miedler → replaced by (United States) Christian Harrison / (France) Fabrice Martin
- (Mexico) Santiago González / (France) Édouard Roger-Vasselin → replaced by (Mexico) Santiago González / (Mexico) Miguel Ángel Reyes-Varela
- (Germany) Kevin Krawietz / (Germany) Tim Pütz → replaced by (India) Sriram Balaji / (United Kingdom) Luke Johnson
