= 2018 Mallorca Open =

- Date: 18 – 24 June
- Edition: 3rd
- Category: WTA International tournaments
- Draw: 32S / 16D
- Prize money: $250,000
- Surface: Grass
- Location: Santa Ponsa, Mallorca, Spain
- Venue: Santa Ponsa Tennis Club

Champions

Singles
- (Germany) Tatjana Maria

Doubles
- (Slovenia) Andreja Klepač / (Spain) María José Martínez Sánchez
← 2017 ·	Mallorca Open	· 2019 →

The 2018 Mallorca Open was a women's tennis tournament played on grass courts. It was the 3rd edition of the Mallorca Open, and part of the International category of the 2018 WTA Tour. It took place at Santa Ponsa Tennis Club in Mallorca, Spain, from 18 June through 24 June 2018. Tatjana Maria won the singles title.

== Points and prize money ==
=== Point distribution ===
Event	W	F	SF	QF	Round of 16	Round of 32	Q	Q2	Q1
Singles	280	180	110	60	30	1	18	12	1
Doubles	280	180	110	60	1	—	—	—	—

=== Prize money ===
Event	W	F	SF	QF	Round of 16	Round of 32	Q2	Q1
Singles	€34,677	€17,258	€9,274	€4,980	€2,742	€1,694	€823	€884
Doubles	€9,919	€5,161	€2,770	€1,468	€774	—	—	—

== WTA singles main draw entrants ==
=== Seeds ===
Country	Player	Rank^{1}	Seed
FRA	Caroline Garcia	6	1
GER	Angelique Kerber	11	2
LAT	Anastasija Sevastova	20	3
EST	Anett Kontaveit	24	4
ESP	Carla Suárez Navarro	27	5
USA	Danielle Collins	39	6
CZE	Lucie Šafářová	44	7
BLR	Aryna Sabalenka	46	8

- ^{1} Rankings are as of June 11, 2018.

=== Other entrants ===
The following players received wildcards into the main draw:

- (Spain) Lara Arruabarrena
- (Ukraine) Marta Kostyuk
- (Russia) Svetlana Kuznetsova
- (Italy) Francesca Schiavone

The following players received entry using a protected ranking into the main draw:

- (Belarus) Victoria Azarenka

The following player received entry as a special exempt:

- (Belgium) ~~Kirsten Flipkens~~

The following players received entry from the qualifying draw:

- (United States) Sofia Kenin
- (Sweden) Johanna Larsson
- (Germany) Antonia Lottner
- (Sweden) Rebecca Peterson
- (United States) Alison Riske
- (Australia) Ajla Tomljanović

The following players received entry as lucky losers:

- (Slovakia) Viktória Kužmová
- (Switzerland) Stefanie Vögele

=== Withdrawals ===
Before the tournament

- (Belgium) Kirsten Flipkens → replaced by (Slovakia) Viktória Kužmová
- (Serbia) Aleksandra Krunić → replaced by (Switzerland) Stefanie Vögele
- (Romania) Monica Niculescu → replaced by (Poland) Magda Linette
- (Poland) Agnieszka Radwańska → replaced by (Ukraine) Kateryna Kozlova
- (China) Zhang Shuai → replaced by (Czech Republic) Markéta Vondroušová

== WTA doubles main draw entrants ==
=== Seeds ===
Country	Player	Country	Player	Rank^{1}	Seed
SLO	Andreja Klepač	ESP	María José Martínez Sánchez	26	1
UKR	Nadiia Kichenok	AUS	Anastasia Rodionova	79	2
AUS	Monique Adamczak	CZE	Renata Voráčová	84	3
GEO	Oksana Kalashnikova	JPN	Makoto Ninomiya	85	4

- ^{1} Rankings are as of 11 June 2018.

=== Other entrants ===
The following pairs received wildcards into the doubles main draw:

- (Romania) Sorana Cîrstea / (Germany) Andrea Petkovic
- (Czech Republic) Lucie Šafářová / (Czech Republic) Barbora Štefková

== Champions ==
=== Singles ===
- (Germany) Tatjana Maria def. (Latvia) Anastasija Sevastova, 6–4, 7–5

=== Doubles ===
- (Slovenia) Andreja Klepač / (Spain) María José Martínez Sánchez def. (Czech Republic) Lucie Šafářová / (Czech Republic) Barbora Štefková, 6–1, 3–6, [10–3]
