= 2023 Mallorca Championships =

- Date: 25 June–1 July
- Edition: 3rd
- Category: ATP Tour 250
- Draw: 28S / 16D
- Surface: Grass
- Location: Santa Ponsa, Spain
- Venue: Santa Ponsa Tennis Academy

Champions

Singles
- (United States) Christopher Eubanks

Doubles
- (India) Yuki Bhambri / (South Africa) Lloyd Harris
- Mallorca Championships

The 2023 Mallorca Championships was a men's tennis tournament played on outdoor grass courts. It was the third edition of the Mallorca Championships, and part of the ATP Tour 250 series of the 2023 ATP Tour. It was held at the Santa Ponsa Tennis Academy in Santa Ponsa, Spain, from 25 June to 1 July 2023.

== Champions ==
=== Singles ===
- (United States) Christopher Eubanks defeated (France) Adrian Mannarino, 6–1, 6–4

=== Doubles ===
- (India) Yuki Bhambri / (South Africa) Lloyd Harris defeated (Netherlands) Robin Haase / (Austria) Philipp Oswald, 6–3, 6–4

== Singles main draw entrants ==
=== Seeds ===
Country	Player	Rank^{1}	Seed
GRE	Stefanos Tsitsipas	5	1
ESP	Alejandro Davidovich Fokina	33	2
USA	Ben Shelton	35	3
FRA	Adrian Mannarino	46	4
~~KAZ~~	~~Alexander Bublik~~	~~48~~	~~5~~
FRA	Richard Gasquet	49	6
ESP	Bernabé Zapata Miralles	50	7
ESP	Roberto Carballés Baena	52	8

- ^{1} Rankings are as of 19 June 2023.

=== Other entrants ===
The following players received wildcards into the main draw:

- (France) Richard Gasquet
- (Spain) Feliciano López
- (Greece) Stefanos Tsitsipas

The following player received entry using a protected ranking:

- (Argentina) Guido Pella

The following players received entry from the qualifying draw:

- (South Africa) Lloyd Harris
- Roman Safiullin
- (Jordan) Abdullah Shelbayh
- (Australia) Li Tu

The following players received entry as lucky losers:

- Pavel Kotov
- (United States) Alex Michelsen
- (France) Arthur Rinderknech

=== Withdrawals ===
- (Kazakhstan) Alexander Bublik → replaced by (France) Arthur Rinderknech
- (Serbia) Laslo Djere → replaced by (United States) Marcos Giron
- (Netherlands) Tallon Griekspoor → replaced by (Australia) Christopher O'Connell
- (France) Ugo Humbert → replaced by (United States) Alex Michelsen
- Aslan Karatsev → replaced by (United States) Christopher Eubanks
- (Australia) Nick Kyrgios → replaced by Pavel Kotov

== Doubles main draw entrants ==
=== Seeds ===
Country	Player	Country	Player	Rank^{1}	Seed
MEX	Santiago González	FRA	Édouard Roger-Vasselin	23	1
BEL	Sander Gillé	BEL	Joran Vliegen	47	2
ARG	Máximo González	ARG	Andrés Molteni	53	3
ESP	Marcel Granollers	ARG	Horacio Zeballos	55	4

- ^{1} Rankings are as of 19 June 2023.

=== Other entrants ===
The following pairs received wildcards into the doubles main draw:

- (Spain) Feliciano López / (Greece) Stefanos Tsitsipas
- (Netherlands) Bart Stevens / (Greece) Petros Tsitsipas

=== Withdrawals ===
- (Germany) Kevin Krawietz / (Germany) Tim Pütz → replaced by (India) Yuki Bhambri / (South Africa) Lloyd Harris
- (Australia) Jason Kubler / (Australia) Max Purcell → replaced by (Australia) Jason Kubler / (Australia) Luke Saville
- (France) Fabrice Martin / (Germany) Andreas Mies → replaced by (Brazil) Marcelo Demoliner / (France) Fabrice Martin
