= 2024 Mallorca Championships – Singles =

Singles
- 2024 Mallorca Championships

Final
- Champion: (Chile) Alejandro Tabilo
- Runner-up: (Austria) Sebastian Ofner
- Score: 6–3, 6–4

Details
- Draw: 28
- Seeds: 8

Events
Singles	Doubles
← 2023 ·	Mallorca Championships	· 2025 →

Alejandro Tabilo won the singles title at the 2024 Mallorca Championships, defeating Sebastian Ofner in the final, 6–3, 6–4. He became the first Chilean man in the Open Era to win a grass-court title.

Christopher Eubanks was the defending champion, but lost to Jakub Menšík in the first round.

== Seeds ==
The top four seeds received a bye into the second round.

1. (United States) Ben Shelton (quarterfinals)
2. (France) Ugo Humbert (second round)
3. (France) Adrian Mannarino (second round)
4. (Chile) Alejandro Tabilo (champion)
5. (Italy) Luciano Darderi (second round)
6. (France) Gaël Monfils (semifinals)
7. (Australia) Jordan Thompson (withdrew)
8. (United States) Christopher Eubanks (first round)

== Draw ==
=== Key ===
- Q = Qualifier
- WC = Wild card
- LL = Lucky loser
- Alt = Alternate
- ITF = ITF entry
- PR = Protected ranking
- SR = Special ranking
- SE = Special exempt
- JE = Junior exempt
- JR = Junior Accelerator Programme entrant
- CO = College Accelerator Programme entrant
- NG = Next Gen Accelerator Program entrant
- w/o = Walkover
- r = Retired
- d = Defaulted

=== Finals ===
Semifinals
Q	(United Kingdom) Paul Jubb	4	5
(Austria) Sebastian Ofner	6	7
4	(Chile) Alejandro Tabilo	2	6	7^{7}
6	(France) Gaël Monfils	6	2	6^{3}

Final
(Austria) Sebastian Ofner	3	4
4	(Chile) Alejandro Tabilo	6	6

=== Top half ===
First round
(Italy) L Nardi	2	6	5
(Australia) R Hijikata	6	2	7
Q	(United Kingdom) P Jubb	6	6
Q	(Germany) M Marterer	1	2
(Germany) Y Hanfmann	5	2
Q	(Australia) A Walton	7	6
(Portugal) N Borges	3	6^{4}
(United States) A Michelsen	6	7^{7}
(Spain) J Munar	6	4	6^{4}
(Austria) S Ofner	3	6	7^{7}
(Spain) P Martínez	5	5
5	(Italy) L Darderi	7	7

Second round
1	(United States) B Shelton	6	6
(Australia) R Hijikata	4	0
Q	(United Kingdom) P Jubb	6	6
Q	(Australia) A Walton	0	3
3	(France) A Mannarino	6^{5}	4
(United States) A Michelsen	7^{7}	6
(Austria) S Ofner	6	7
5	(Italy) L Darderi	3	5

Quarterfinals
1	(United States) B Shelton	3	6	6^{8}
Q	(United Kingdom) P Jubb	6	3	7^{10}
(United States) A Michelsen	6	5	3
(Austria) S Ofner	3	7	6

Semifinals
Q	(United Kingdom) P Jubb	4	5
(Austria) S Ofner	6	7

=== Bottom half ===
First round
8	(United States) C Eubanks	3	6	1
(Czech Republic) J Menšík	6	3	6
WC	(Italy) F Fognini	7^{7}	7^{7}
LL	(Netherlands) G Brouwer	6^{4}	6^{5}
Q	(France) C Lestienne	5	6^{5}
(Kazakhstan) A Shevchenko	7	7^{7}
6	(France) G Monfils	6	7^{7}
WC	(Austria) D Thiem	3	6^{3}
(Spain) R Carballés Baena	7^{7}	4	7^{7}
WC	(Spain) P Carreño Busta	6^{4}	6	6^{3}
(Spain) R Bautista Agut	6	6
(Japan) T Daniel	1	0

Second round
(Czech Republic) J Menšík	4	6	7
WC	(Italy) F Fognini	6	3	5
(Kazakhstan) A Shevchenko	3	2
4	(Chile) A Tabilo	6	6
6	(France) G Monfils	6	6
(Spain) R Carballés Baena	3	4
(Spain) R Bautista Agut	3	6	6
2	(France) U Humbert	6	3	4

Quarterfinals
(Czech Republic) J Menšík	4	4
4	(Chile) A Tabilo	6	6
6	(France) G Monfils	6	4	6
(Spain) R Bautista Agut	3	6	4

Semifinals
4	(Chile) A Tabilo	2	6	7^{7}
6	(France) G Monfils	6	2	6^{3}

== Qualifying ==
=== Seeds ===
1. (Brazil) Thiago Monteiro (qualifying competition)
2. (Germany) Maximilian Marterer (qualified)
3. (France) Constant Lestienne (qualified)
4. (Australia) Adam Walton (qualified)
5. (Netherlands) Gijs Brouwer (qualifying competition, lucky loser)
6. (Jordan) Abdullah Shelbayh (qualifying competition)
7. (United Kingdom) Paul Jubb (qualified)
8. (Germany) Daniel Masur (qualifying competition)

=== Qualifiers ===
1. (United Kingdom) Paul Jubb
2. (Germany) Maximilian Marterer
3. (France) Constant Lestienne
4. (Australia) Adam Walton

=== Lucky loser ===
1. (Netherlands) Gijs Brouwer

=== Qualifying draw ===
==== First qualifier ====
First round
1	(Brazil) Thiago Monteiro	7^{7}	6
(Japan) Rio Noguchi	6^{5}	0
WC	(Spain) Joan Nadal	1	2
7/WC	(United Kingdom) Paul Jubb	6	6

Qualifying competition
1	(Brazil) Thiago Monteiro	3	4
7/WC	(United Kingdom) Paul Jubb	6	6

==== Second qualifier ====
First round
2	(Germany) Maximilian Marterer	6	7
(Australia) Luke Saville	3	5
(India) Ramkumar Ramanathan	6^{2}	6^{4}
6	(Jordan) Abdullah Shelbayh	7^{7}	7^{7}

Qualifying competition
2	(Germany) Maximilian Marterer	6	3	6
6	(Jordan) Abdullah Shelbayh	4	6	2

==== Third qualifier ====
First round
3	(France) Constant Lestienne	7^{7}	6
(Belgium) Michael Geerts	6^{5}	1
(Germany) Sebastian Fanselow	3	5
5	(Netherlands) Gijs Brouwer	6	7

Qualifying competition
3	(France) Constant Lestienne	6	6
5	(Netherlands) Gijs Brouwer	3	3

==== Fourth qualifier ====
First round
4	(Australia) Adam Walton	7^{7}	6
(Spain) David Jordà Sanchis	6^{3}	3
Alt	(Argentina) Hernán Casanova	1	3
8	(Germany) Daniel Masur	6	6

Qualifying competition
4	(Australia) Adam Walton	6	7^{7}
8	(Germany) Daniel Masur	2	6^{4}
