= 2023 Mallorca Championships – Singles =

Singles
- 2023 Mallorca Championships

Final
- Champion: (United States) Christopher Eubanks
- Runner-up: (France) Adrian Mannarino
- Score: 6–1, 6–4

Details
- Draw: 28
- Seeds: 8

Events
Singles	Doubles
← 2022 ·	Mallorca Championships	· 2024 →

Christopher Eubanks defeated Adrian Mannarino in the final, 6–1, 6–4 to win the singles title at the 2023 Mallorca Championships. It was Eubanks' first ATP singles title. He saved five match points in the semifinals against Lloyd Harris.

Stefanos Tsitsipas was the defending champion, but lost in the second round to Yannick Hanfmann.

The tournament marked the final professional appearance of former world No. 12 Feliciano López. He lost in the quarterfinals to Hanfmann.

== Seeds ==
The top four seeds received a bye into the second round.

1. (Greece) Stefanos Tsitsipas (second round)
2. (Spain) Alejandro Davidovich Fokina (second round)
3. (United States) Ben Shelton (second round)
4. (France) Adrian Mannarino (final)
5. (Kazakhstan) Alexander Bublik (withdrew)
6. (France) Richard Gasquet (first round)
7. (Spain) Bernabé Zapata Miralles (first round)
8. (Spain) Roberto Carballés Baena (second round)

== Draw ==
=== Key ===
- Q = Qualifier
- WC = Wild card
- LL = Lucky loser
- Alt = Alternate
- SE = Special exempt
- PR = Protected ranking
- ITF = ITF entry
- JE = Junior exempt
- w/o = Walkover
- r = Retired
- d = Defaulted
- SR = Special ranking

=== Finals ===
Semifinals
(Germany) Yannick Hanfmann	6^{4}	4
4	(France) Adrian Mannarino	7^{7}	6
(United States) Christopher Eubanks	4	6	7^{11}
Q	(South Africa) Lloyd Harris	6	3	6^{9}

Final
4	(France) Adrian Mannarino	1	4
(United States) Christopher Eubanks	6	6

=== Top half ===
First round
(Germany) Y Hanfmann	6	6
(Argentina) P Cachín	2	1
WC	(Spain) F López	6	7
(Australia) M Purcell	3	5
(Australia) J Thompson	6	6
6/WC	(France) R Gasquet	3	4
PR	(Argentina) G Pella	3	6	7^{7}
(United States) M Giron	6	2	6^{3}
(France) C Moutet	7	6
(Australia) C O'Connell	5	4
I Ivashka	4	6	3
8	(Spain) R Carballés Baena	6	1	6

Second round
1/WC	(Greece) S Tsitsipas	4	6	2
(Germany) Y Hanfmann	6	3	6
WC	(Spain) F López	7^{8}	1	6
(Australia) J Thompson	6^{6}	6	3
4	(France) A Mannarino	3	7^{7}	6
PR	(Argentina) G Pella	6	6^{5}	3
(France) C Moutet	6	7^{7}
8	(Spain) R Carballés Baena	3	6^{4}

Quarterfinals
(Germany) Y Hanfmann	6	6
WC	(Spain) F López	2	4
4	(France) A Mannarino	7	6
(France) C Moutet	5	2

Semifinals
(Germany) Y Hanfmann	6^{4}	4
4	(France) A Mannarino	7^{7}	6

=== Bottom half ===
First round
LL	(France) A Rinderknech	7^{7}	7^{7}
(Spain) A Ramos Viñolas	6^{0}	6^{3}
(France) C Lestienne	6	4	6
(Australia) J Kubler	4	6	4
LL	(United States) A Michelsen	3	7^{8}	5
(United States) C Eubanks	6	6^{6}	7
7	(Spain) B Zapata Miralles	2	6^{2}
Q	(South Africa) L Harris	6	7^{7}
Q	R Safiullin	6	6
Q	(Jordan) A Shelbayh	1	4
LL	P Kotov	7^{7}	6
Q	(Australia) L Tu	6^{4}	3

Second round
LL	(France) A Rinderknech	6	6
(France) C Lestienne	3	2
(United States) C Eubanks	6^{4}	6	7^{7}
3	(United States) B Shelton	7^{7}	4	6^{2}
Q	(South Africa) L Harris	7^{7}	6
Q	R Safiullin	6^{5}	3
LL	P Kotov	2	6	6
2	(Spain) A Davidovich Fokina	6	3	4

Quarterfinals
LL	(France) A Rinderknech	6^{5}	6^{4}
(United States) C Eubanks	7^{7}	7^{7}
Q	(South Africa) L Harris	7	6
LL	P Kotov	5	2

Semifinals
(United States) C Eubanks	4	6	7^{11}
Q	(South Africa) L Harris	6	3	6^{9}

== Qualifying ==
=== Seeds ===
1. (France) Arthur Rinderknech (qualifying competition, lucky loser)
2. (Germany) Dominik Koepfer (withdrew)
3. Roman Safiullin (qualified)
4. Pavel Kotov (qualifying competition, lucky loser)
5. (Jordan) Abdullah Shelbayh (qualified)
6. (Australia) Li Tu (qualified)
7. (United States) Alex Michelsen (qualifying competition, lucky loser)
8. (Belgium) Michael Geerts (first round)

=== Qualifiers ===
1. (Jordan) Abdullah Shelbayh
2. (South Africa) Lloyd Harris
3. Roman Safiullin
4. (Australia) Li Tu

=== Lucky losers ===
1. Pavel Kotov
2. (United States) Alex Michelsen
3. (France) Arthur Rinderknech

=== Qualifying draw ===
==== First qualifier ====
First round
1	(France) Arthur Rinderknech	3	6	6
Alt	(Germany) Rudolf Molleker	6	1	4
(Spain) Daniel Rincón	3	2
5	(Jordan) Abdullah Shelbayh	6	6

Qualifying competition
1	(France) Arthur Rinderknech	6	6^{5}	4
5	(Jordan) Abdullah Shelbayh	4	7^{7}	6

==== Second qualifier ====
First round
Alt	(South Africa) Lloyd Harris	6^{3}	6	6
WC	(Czech Republic) Jiří Veselý	7^{7}	3	3
(Germany) Daniel Masur	5	4
7	(United States) Alex Michelsen	7	6

Qualifying competition
Alt	(South Africa) Lloyd Harris	6^{1}	6	6
7	(United States) Alex Michelsen	7^{7}	4	1

==== Third qualifier ====
First round
3	Roman Safiullin	7	6
(Spain) Alejandro Moro Cañas	5	1
(Australia) James McCabe	6	3	7^{7}
8	(Belgium) Michael Geerts	3	6	6^{4}

Qualifying competition
3	Roman Safiullin	7	4	7^{7}
(Australia) James McCabe	5	6	6^{5}

==== Fourth qualifier ====
First round
4	Pavel Kotov	6	7^{7}
WC	(Spain) Fernando Verdasco	1	6^{5}
(Canada) Steven Diez	4	3
6	(Australia) Li Tu	6	6

Qualifying competition
4	Pavel Kotov	6^{5}	2
6	(Australia) Li Tu	7^{7}	6
