= 2018 Mallorca Open – Doubles =

Doubles
- 2018 Mallorca Open

Final
- Champions: (Slovenia) Andreja Klepač (Spain) María José Martínez Sánchez
- Runners-up: (Czech Republic) Lucie Šafářová (Czech Republic) Barbora Štefková
- Score: 6–1, 3–6, [10–3]

Details
- Draw: 16 (2WC)
- Seeds: 4

Events
Singles	Doubles
- Mallorca Open

Latisha Chan and Martina Hingis were the defending champions, but Chan chose to compete in Birmingham and Hingis retired from professional tennis at the end of 2017.

Andreja Klepač and María José Martínez Sánchez won the title, defeating Lucie Šafářová and Barbora Štefková in the final, 6–1, 3–6, [10–3].

== Seeds ==
1. (Slovenia) Andreja Klepač / (Spain) María José Martínez Sánchez (champions)
2. (Ukraine) Nadiia Kichenok / (Australia) Anastasia Rodionova (quarterfinals)
3. (Australia) Monique Adamczak / (Czech Republic) Renata Voráčová (first round)
4. (Georgia (country)) Oksana Kalashnikova / (Japan) Makoto Ninomiya (first round)

== Draw ==
Key

- Q = Qualifier
- WC = Wild card
- LL = Lucky loser
- Alt = Alternate
- ITF = ITF entry
- PR = Protected ranking
- SR = Special ranking
- SE = Special exempt
- JE = Junior exempt
- JR = Junior Accelerator Programme entrant
- CO = College Accelerator Programme entrant
- NG = Next Gen Accelerator Program entrant
- w/o = Walkover
- r = Retired
- d = Defaulted

=== Draw ===
First round
1	(Slovenia) A Klepač (Spain) MJ Martínez Sánchez	6	6
PR	(Spain) A Medina Garrigues (Spain) A Parra Santonja	4	2
(Poland) A Rosolska (United States) A Spears	7	5	[12]
(Australia) J Moore (Mexico) G Olmos	5	7	[10]
4	(Georgia (country)) O Kalashnikova (Japan) M Ninomiya	4	2
(Switzerland) X Knoll (United Kingdom) A Smith	6	6
WC	(Romania) S Cîrstea (Germany) A Petkovic	6	6
(Croatia) D Jurak (Sweden) C Lister	1	4
(United States) K Christian (United States) S Santamaria	6	6
(Belarus) V Azarenka (Russia) S Kuznetsova	2	3
WC	(Czech Republic) L Šafářová (Czech Republic) B Štefková	6	6
3	(Australia) M Adamczak (Czech Republic) R Voráčová	3	3
(Russia) V Kudermetova (Belarus) A Sabalenka	4	6	[2]
(Netherlands) L Kerkhove (Belarus) L Marozava	6	3	[10]
(United States) D Collins (Chinese Taipei) S-w Hsieh	7	3	[6]
2	(Ukraine) N Kichenok (Australia) An Rodionova	5	6	[10]

Quarterfinals
1	(Slovenia) A Klepač (Spain) MJ Martínez Sánchez	6	6
(Poland) A Rosolska (United States) A Spears	3	1
(Switzerland) X Knoll (United Kingdom) A Smith	6	6
WC	(Romania) S Cîrstea (Germany) A Petkovic	4	4
(United States) K Christian (United States) S Santamaria	4	3
WC	(Czech Republic) L Šafářová (Czech Republic) B Štefková	6	6
(Netherlands) L Kerkhove (Belarus) L Marozava	6^{5}	7	[10]
2	(Ukraine) N Kichenok (Australia) An Rodionova	7^{7}	5	[5]

Semifinals
1	(Slovenia) A Klepač (Spain) MJ Martínez Sánchez	6	6
(Switzerland) X Knoll (United Kingdom) A Smith	4	4
WC	(Czech Republic) L Šafářová (Czech Republic) B Štefková	6	6
(Netherlands) L Kerkhove (Belarus) L Marozava	0	4

Final
1	(Slovenia) A Klepač (Spain) MJ Martínez Sánchez	6	3	[10]
WC	(Czech Republic) L Šafářová (Czech Republic) B Štefková	1	6	[3]
