= 2023 Mallorca Championships – Doubles =

Doubles
- 2023 Mallorca Championships

Final
- Champions: (India) Yuki Bhambri (South Africa) Lloyd Harris
- Runners-up: (Netherlands) Robin Haase (Austria) Philipp Oswald
- Score: 6–3, 6–4

Events
Singles	Doubles
- Mallorca Championships

Yuki Bhambri and Lloyd Harris won the doubles title at the 2023 Mallorca Championships, defeating Robin Haase and Philipp Oswald in the final, 6–3, 6–4.

Rafael Matos and David Vega Hernández were the reigning champions, but Vega Hernández chose to compete in Eastbourne instead. Matos partnered with Francisco Cabral, but lost in the quarterfinals to Santiago González and Édouard Roger-Vasselin.

== Seeds ==
1. (Mexico) Santiago González / (France) Édouard Roger-Vasselin (semifinals)
2. (Belgium) Sander Gillé / (Belgium) Joran Vliegen (quarterfinals)
3. (Argentina) Máximo González / (Argentina) Andrés Molteni (quarterfinals)
4. (Spain) Marcel Granollers / (Argentina) Horacio Zeballos (quarterfinals)

== Draw ==
Key

- Q = Qualifier
- WC = Wild card
- LL = Lucky loser
- Alt = Alternate
- ITF = ITF entry
- PR = Protected ranking
- SR = Special ranking
- SE = Special exempt
- JE = Junior exempt
- JR = Junior Accelerator Programme entrant
- CO = College Accelerator Programme entrant
- NG = Next Gen Accelerator Program entrant
- w/o = Walkover
- r = Retired
- d = Defaulted

=== Draw ===
First round
1	(Mexico) S González (France) É Roger-Vasselin	6	6
WC	(Spain) F López (Greece) S Tsitsipas	4	4
(Portugal) F Cabral (Brazil) R Matos	4	6	[10]
(Spain) R Carballés Baena (Spain) B Zapata Miralles	6	3	[2]
4	(Spain) M Granollers (Argentina) H Zeballos	6	7^{7}
(Brazil) M Demoliner (France) F Martin	4	6^{4}
PR	(India) Y Bhambri (South Africa) L Harris	6	6
(Austria) A Erler (Austria) L Miedler	3	2
(Netherlands) R Haase (Austria) P Oswald	6^{4}	6	[10]
(France) S Doumbia (France) F Reboul	7^{7}	3	[8]
(Brazil) M Melo (Australia) J Peers	6^{5}	6	[5]
3	(Argentina) M González (Argentina) A Molteni	7^{7}	3	[10]
(Australia) J Kubler (Australia) L Saville	4	4
(United States) N Lammons (United States) J Withrow	6	6
WC	(Netherlands) B Stevens (Greece) Pe Tsitsipas	7^{7}	5	[7]
2	(Belgium) S Gillé (Belgium) J Vliegen	6^{5}	7	[10]

Quarterfinals
1	(Mexico) S González (France) É Roger-Vasselin	6	7^{7}
(Portugal) F Cabral (Brazil) R Matos	3	6^{3}
4	(Spain) M Granollers (Argentina) H Zeballos	4	4
PR	(India) Y Bhambri (South Africa) L Harris	6	6
(Netherlands) R Haase (Austria) P Oswald	7	6
3	(Argentina) M González (Argentina) A Molteni	5	4
(United States) N Lammons (United States) J Withrow	4	6	[10]
2	(Belgium) S Gillé (Belgium) J Vliegen	6	3	8

Semifinals
1	(Mexico) S González (France) É Roger-Vasselin	4	6^{2}
PR	(India) Y Bhambri (South Africa) L Harris	6	7^{7}
(Netherlands) R Haase (Austria) P Oswald	7	6
(United States) N Lammons (United States) J Withrow	5	4

Final
PR	(India) Y Bhambri (South Africa) L Harris	6	6
(Netherlands) R Haase (Austria) P Oswald	3	4
