= 2026 Mallorca Championships – Doubles =

Doubles
- 2026 Mallorca Championships

Final
- Champions: (France) Théo Arribagé (France) Albano Olivetti
- Runners-up: (Sweden) André Göransson (United States) Evan King
- Score: 7–6^{(8–6)}, 3–6, [11–9]

Details
- Draw: 16
- Seeds: 4

Events
Singles	Doubles
- Mallorca Championships

Théo Arribagé and Albano Olivetti defeated André Göransson and Evan King in the final, 7–6^{(8–6)}, 3–6, [11–9] to win the doubles tennis title at the 2026 Mallorca Championships. It was their second title in as many weeks, following Halle.

Santiago González and Austin Krajicek were the defending champions, but chose not to participate together. González partnered Máximo González, but lost in the quarterfinals to Arribagé and Olivetti. Krajicek partnered Nikola Mektić, but lost in the first round to Sriram Balaji and Marcelo Demoliner.

== Seeds ==
1. (Portugal) Francisco Cabral / (Austria) Lucas Miedler (first round)
2. (United States) Robert Cash / (United States) JJ Tracy (first round)
3. (United States) Austin Krajicek / (Croatia) Nikola Mektić (first round)
4. (France) Théo Arribagé / (France) Albano Olivetti (champions)

== Draw ==
Key

- Q = Qualifier
- WC = Wild card
- LL = Lucky loser
- Alt = Alternate
- ITF = ITF entry
- PR = Protected ranking
- SR = Special ranking
- SE = Special exempt
- JE = Junior exempt
- JR = Junior Accelerator Programme entrant
- CO = College Accelerator Programme entrant
- NG = Next Gen Accelerator Program entrant
- w/o = Walkover
- r = Retired
- d = Defaulted

=== Draw ===
First round
1	(Portugal) F Cabral (Austria) L Miedler	6	3	[5]
(Germany) C Frantzen (Netherlands) R Haase	3	6	[10]
(Brazil) M Melo (Argentina) A Molteni	w/o
(Peru) I Buse (Italy) L Darderi
3	(United States) A Krajicek (Croatia) N Mektić	6	6^{7}	[11]
Alt	(India) S Balaji (Brazil) M Demoliner	4	7^{9}	[13]
WC	(Jordan) A Shelbayh (Spain) P Vives Marcos	4	6^{3}
(Sweden) A Göransson (United States) E King	6	7^{7}
(Argentina) M González (Mexico) S González	7^{7}	7
(Netherlands) S Arends (Netherlands) D Pel	6^{4}	5
(Australia) M Polmans (United States) R Seggerman	6	6^{7}	[8]
4	(France) T Arribagé (France) A Olivetti	2	7^{9}	[10]
(Germany) J Schnaitter (Germany) M Wallner	6^{7}	4
(Czech Republic) A Pavlásek (Czech Republic) P Rikl	7^{9}	6
(United States) R Galloway (United States) V Kirkov	7	6
2	(United States) R Cash (United States) JJ Tracy	5	3

Quarterfinals
(Germany) C Frantzen (Netherlands) R Haase	3	6	[12]
(Brazil) M Melo (Argentina) A Molteni	6	3	[10]
Alt	(India) S Balaji (Brazil) M Demoliner	4	7^{7}	[5]
(Sweden) A Göransson (United States) E King	6	6^{5}	[10]
(Argentina) M González (Mexico) S González	6^{5}	3
4	(France) T Arribagé (France) A Olivetti	7^{7}	6
(Czech Republic) A Pavlásek (Czech Republic) P Rikl	6	6
(United States) R Galloway (United States) V Kirkov	2	4

Semifinals
(Germany) C Frantzen (Netherlands) R Haase	6	5	[4]
(Sweden) A Göransson (United States) E King	4	7	[10]
4	(France) T Arribagé (France) A Olivetti	7^{7}	6
(Czech Republic) A Pavlásek (Czech Republic) P Rikl	6^{2}	4

Final
(Sweden) A Göransson (United States) E King	6^{6}	6	[9]
4	(France) T Arribagé (France) A Olivetti	7^{8}	3	[11]
