= 2018 Mallorca Open – Singles =

Singles
- 2018 Mallorca Open

Final
- Champion: (Germany) Tatjana Maria
- Runner-up: (Latvia) Anastasija Sevastova
- Score: 6–4, 7–5

Details
- Draw: 32
- Seeds: 8

Events
Singles	Doubles
- Mallorca Open

Tatjana Maria defeated the defending champion Anastasija Sevastova in the final, 6–4, 7–5 to win the singles title at the 2018 Mallorca Open. It was her maiden WTA singles title.

== Seeds ==
1. (France) Caroline Garcia (quarterfinals)
2. (Germany) Angelique Kerber (first round)
3. (Latvia) Anastasija Sevastova (final)
4. (Estonia) Anett Kontaveit (first round)
5. (Spain) Carla Suárez Navarro (first round)
6. (United States) Danielle Collins (first round)
7. (Czech Republic) Lucie Šafářová (quarterfinals)
8. (Belarus) Aryna Sabalenka (first round)

== Draw ==
Key

- Q = Qualifier
- WC = Wild card
- LL = Lucky loser
- Alt = Alternate
- ITF = ITF entry
- PR = Protected ranking
- SR = Special ranking
- SE = Special exempt
- JE = Junior exempt
- JR = Junior Accelerator Programme entrant
- CO = College Accelerator Programme entrant
- NG = Next Gen Accelerator Program entrant
- w/o = Walkover
- r = Retired
- d = Defaulted

=== Finals ===
Semifinals
Q	(United States) Sofia Kenin	2	6	4
(Germany) Tatjana Maria	6	2	6
3	(Latvia) Anastasija Sevastova	7^{7}	6
(Australia) Samantha Stosur	6^{1}	1

Final
(Germany) Tatjana Maria	6	7
3	(Latvia) Anastasija Sevastova	4	5

=== Top half ===
First round
1	(France) C Garcia	7^{7}	1	6
(Chinese Taipei) S-w Hsieh	6^{4}	6	4
Q	(Sweden) J Larsson	2	6	6
(Romania) S Cîrstea	6	3	2
Q	(United States) S Kenin	6	3	6
(Ukraine) K Kozlova	3	6	3
(Belgium) A Van Uytvanck	3	6	6
8	(Belarus) A Sabalenka	6	4	2
4	(Estonia) A Kontaveit	6	4	3
(Germany) T Maria	3	6	6
(Germany) C Witthöft	6	6^{2}	6
WC	(Italy) F Schiavone	1	7^{7}	3
LL	(Switzerland) S Vögele	7^{7}	3	5
PR	(Belarus) V Azarenka	6^{4}	6	7
WC	(Ukraine) M Kostyuk	4	5
7	(Czech Republic) L Šafářová	6	7

Second round
1	(France) C Garcia	6	6
Q	(Sweden) J Larsson	4	3
Q	(United States) S Kenin	2	6	6
(Belgium) A Van Uytvanck	6	4	4
(Germany) T Maria	7^{7}	6
(Germany) C Witthöft	6^{1}	3
PR	(Belarus) V Azarenka	3	4
7	(Czech Republic) L Šafářová	6	6

Quarterfinals
1	(France) C Garcia	3	3
Q	(United States) S Kenin	6	6
(Germany) T Maria	7^{7}	4	6
7	(Czech Republic) L Šafářová	6^{3}	6	4

Semifinals
Q	(United States) S Kenin	2	6	4
(Germany) T Maria	6	2	6

=== Bottom half ===
First round
6	(United States) D Collins	3	3
Q	(Sweden) R Peterson	6	6
Q	(Australia) A Tomljanović	6	6
(Poland) M Linette	3	4
Q	(Germany) A Lottner	6	6
(Belarus) A Sasnovich	4	0
WC	(Russia) S Kuznetsova	3	3
3	(Latvia) A Sevastova	6	6
5	(Spain) C Suárez Navarro	4	6^{4}
WC	(Spain) L Arruabarrena	6	7^{7}
(Australia) S Stosur	6	7
(Czech Republic) M Vondroušová	2	5
(Slovenia) P Hercog	7^{7}	6
LL	(Slovakia) V Kužmová	6^{3}	2
Q	(United States) A Riske	5	6	6
2	(Germany) A Kerber	7	2	1

Second round
Q	(Sweden) R Peterson	3	3
Q	(Australia) A Tomljanović	6	6
Q	(Germany) A Lottner	6	3	1
3	(Latvia) A Sevastova	1	6	6
WC	(Spain) L Arruabarrena	3	4
(Australia) S Stosur	6	6
(Slovenia) P Hercog	6	5	3
Q	(United States) A Riske	3	7	6

Quarterfinals
Q	(Australia) A Tomljanović	6	3	1
3	(Latvia) A Sevastova	3	6	6
(Australia) S Stosur	6	6
Q	(United States) A Riske	4	2

Semifinals
3	(Latvia) A Sevastova	7^{7}	6
(Australia) S Stosur	6^{1}	1

== Qualifying ==
=== Seeds ===
1. (Sweden) Johanna Larsson (qualified)
2. (United States) Alison Riske (qualified)
3. (Australia) Ajla Tomljanović (qualified)
4. (Sweden) Rebecca Peterson (qualified)
5. (Slovakia) Viktória Kužmová (qualifying competition, lucky loser)
6. (Germany) Andrea Petkovic (first round)
7. (United States) Sofia Kenin (qualified)
8. (Switzerland) Stefanie Vögele (qualifying competition, lucky loser)
9. (Russia) Anna Blinkova (qualifying competition)
10. (Poland) Magdalena Fręch (qualifying competition)
11. (Belgium) Ysaline Bonaventure (qualifying competition)
12. (Canada) Carol Zhao (first round)

=== Qualifiers ===
1. (Sweden) Johanna Larsson
2. (United States) Alison Riske
3. (Australia) Ajla Tomljanović
4. (Sweden) Rebecca Peterson
5. (United States) Sofia Kenin
6. (Germany) Antonia Lottner

=== Lucky loser ===
1. (Slovakia) Viktória Kužmová
2. (Switzerland) Stefanie Vögele

=== Draw ===
==== First qualifier ====
First round
1	(Sweden) Johanna Larsson	6	6
(Liechtenstein) Kathinka von Deichmann	3	4
(Belgium) Maryna Zanevska	4	6	6
12	(Canada) Carol Zhao	6	3	2

Qualifying competition
1	(Sweden) Johanna Larsson	5	7^{7}	6
(Belgium) Maryna Zanevska	7	6^{1}	3

==== Second qualifier ====
First round
2	(United States) Alison Riske	6	6
(Spain) Paula Badosa Gibert	4	1
(Russia) Vitalia Diatchenko	3	2^{r}
10	(Poland) Magdalena Fręch	6	5

Qualifying competition
2	(United States) Alison Riske	6	5	6
10	(Poland) Magdalena Fręch	3	7	2

==== Third qualifier ====
First round
3	(Australia) Ajla Tomljanović	3	6	6
PR	(Czech Republic) Barbora Štefková	6	3	3
WC	(Sweden) Cornelia Lister	3	2
9	(Russia) Anna Blinkova	6	6

Qualifying competition
3	(Australia) Ajla Tomljanović	6	6
9	(Russia) Anna Blinkova	4	3

==== Fourth qualifier ====
First round
4	(Sweden) Rebecca Peterson	6	2	6
(Czech Republic) Tereza Martincová	3	6	2
(Japan) Miyu Kato	3	7^{7}	3
8	(Switzerland) Stefanie Vögele	6	6^{2}	6

Qualifying competition
4	(Sweden) Rebecca Peterson	7^{7}	2	6
8	(Switzerland) Stefanie Vögele	6^{0}	6	0

==== Fifth qualifier ====
First round
5	(Slovakia) Viktória Kužmová	6	6
WC	(Germany) Lena Rüffer	0	4
WC	(Spain) Rosa Vicens Mas	2	0
7	(United States) Sofia Kenin	6	6

Qualifying competition
5	(Slovakia) Viktória Kužmová	4	4
7	(United States) Sofia Kenin	6	6

==== Sixth qualifier ====
First round
6/WC	(Germany) Andrea Petkovic	2	6^{3}
(Germany) Antonia Lottner	6	7^{7}
(Russia) Veronika Kudermetova	4	0
11	(Belgium) Ysaline Bonaventure	6	6

Qualifying competition
(Germany) Antonia Lottner	3	6	6
11	(Belgium) Ysaline Bonaventure	6	3	4
