= Antoine Ghibaudo =

French tennis player (born 2005)

- Country (sports): France
- Born: 25 January 2005 (age 21) Rambouillet, France
- Height: 1.91 m (6 ft 3 in)
- Plays: Right-handed (two-handed backhand)
- College: Kentucky
- Prize money: $137,611

Singles
- Career record: 0–1 (at ATP Tour level, Grand Slam level, and in Davis Cup)
- Career titles: 0
- Highest ranking: No. 287 (4 May 2026)
- Current ranking: No. 303 (22 June 2026)

Grand Slam singles results
- French Open: Q1 (2026)

Doubles
- Career record: 0–0 (at ATP Tour level, Grand Slam level, and in Davis Cup)
- Career titles: 0
- Highest ranking: No. 1167 (25 November 2024)
- Current ranking: No. 1432 (22 June 2026)
- Last updated on: 22 June 2026.

Antoine Ghibaudo (born 25 January 2005) is a French tennis player. He has a career-high ATP singles ranking of world No. 287 achieved on 4 May 2026 and a doubles ranking of No. 1167 achieved in November 2024.

Ghibaudo played college tennis at the University of Kentucky.

== Career ==
Ghibaudo made his ATP main draw debut at the 2026 Mallorca Championships after entering the singles main draw as a lucky loser.
