= 2026 Mallorca Championships =

- Date: 21–27 June
- Edition: 6th
- Category: ATP 250 tournaments
- Draw: 28S / 16D
- Surface: Grass
- Location: Santa Ponsa, Spain
- Venue: Santa Ponsa Tennis Academy

Champions

Singles
- (Spain) Alejandro Davidovich Fokina

Doubles
- (France) Théo Arribagé / (France) Albano Olivetti
- Mallorca Championships

The 2026 Mallorca Championships was a men's tennis tournament played on outdoor grass courts. It was the sixth edition of the Mallorca Championships, and part of the ATP 250 tournaments of the 2026 ATP Tour. It took place at the Santa Ponsa Tennis Academy in Santa Ponsa, Spain, from 21 to 27 June 2026.

== Champions ==
=== Singles ===
- (Spain) Alejandro Davidovich Fokina def. (United States) Ethan Quinn, 7–6^{(7–4)}, 6–3

=== Doubles ===
- (France) Théo Arribagé / (France) Albano Olivetti def. (Sweden) André Göransson / (United States) Evan King, 7–6^{(8–6)}, 3–6, [11–9]

== Singles main draw entrants ==
=== Seeds ===
Country	Player	Rank^{1}	Seed
ITA	Luciano Darderi	17	1
ESP	Alejandro Davidovich Fokina	22	2
~~USA~~	~~Frances Tiafoe~~	~~26~~	~~3~~
CHI	Alejandro Tabilo	31	4
PER	Ignacio Buse	35	5
FRA	Corentin Moutet	36	6
ARG	Mariano Navone	39	7
FRA	Adrian Mannarino	44	8

- ^{1} Rankings are as of 15 June 2026.

=== Other entrants ===
The following players received wildcards into the main draw:

- (Bulgaria) Grigor Dimitrov
- (Australia) Nick Kyrgios
- (Germany) Jan-Lennard Struff

The following player received entry as a late entry:

- (Greece) Stefanos Tsitsipas

The following players received entry from the qualifying draw:

- (Bosnia and Herzegovina) Damir Džumhur
- (Slovakia) Alex Molčan
- (Australia) Marc Polmans
- (Australia) Adam Walton

The following players received entry as lucky losers:

- (United States) Murphy Cassone
- (France) Antoine Ghibaudo
- (Jordan) Abdullah Shelbayh

=== Withdrawals ===
- (Kazakhstan) Alexander Bublik → replaced by (Jordan) Abdullah Shelbayh
- (Netherlands) Tallon Griekspoor → replaced by (Czech Republic) Vít Kopřiva
- (Serbia) Hamad Medjedovic → replaced by (France) Antoine Ghibaudo
- (United States) Alex Michelsen → replaced by (Spain) Martín Landaluce
- (United States) Frances Tiafoe → replaced by (United States) Murphy Cassone
- (Netherlands) Botic van de Zandschulp → replaced by (Italy) Lorenzo Sonego

== Doubles main draw entrants ==
=== Seeds ===
Country	Player	Country	Player	Rank^{1}	Seed
POR	Francisco Cabral	AUT	Lucas Miedler	44	1
USA	Robert Cash	USA	JJ Tracy	58	2
USA	Austin Krajicek	CRO	Nikola Mektić	60	3
FRA	Théo Arribagé	FRA	Albano Olivetti	64	4

- ^{1} Rankings are as of 15 June 2026.

=== Other entrants ===
The following pairs received wildcards into the doubles main draw:

- ~~(Australia) Nick Kyrgios / (Australia) John-Patrick Smith~~
- (Jordan) Abdullah Shelbayh / (Spain) Pedro Vives Marcos

The following pair received entry as alternates:

- (India) Sriram Balaji / (Brazil) Marcelo Demoliner

=== Withdrawals ===
- (Australia) Nick Kyrgios / (Australia) John-Patrick Smith → replaced by (India) Sriram Balaji / (Brazil) Marcelo Demoliner
