= 2024 Mallorca Championships – Doubles =

Doubles
- 2024 Mallorca Championships

Final
- Champions: (United Kingdom) Julian Cash (United States) Robert Galloway
- Runners-up: (Ecuador) Diego Hidalgo (Chile) Alejandro Tabilo
- Score: 6–4, 6–4

Events
Singles	Doubles
- Mallorca Championships

Julian Cash and Robert Galloway won the doubles title at the 2024 Mallorca Championships, defeating Diego Hidalgo and Alejandro Tabilo in the final, 6–4, 6–4.

Yuki Bhambri and Lloyd Harris were the reigning champions, but Harris did not participate this year. Bhambri partnered Albano Olivetti, but lost in the quarterfinals to Nathaniel Lammons and Jackson Withrow.

== Seeds ==
1. (United States) Nathaniel Lammons / (United States) Jackson Withrow (semifinals)
2. (Belgium) Sander Gillé / (Belgium) Joran Vliegen (first round)
3. (France) Sadio Doumbia / (France) Fabien Reboul (quarterfinals)
4. (Netherlands) Robin Haase / (Argentina) Andrés Molteni (first round)

== Draw ==
Key

- Q = Qualifier
- WC = Wild card
- LL = Lucky loser
- Alt = Alternate
- ITF = ITF entry
- PR = Protected ranking
- SR = Special ranking
- SE = Special exempt
- JE = Junior exempt
- JR = Junior Accelerator Programme entrant
- CO = College Accelerator Programme entrant
- NG = Next Gen Accelerator Program entrant
- w/o = Walkover
- r = Retired
- d = Defaulted

=== Draw ===
First round
1	(United States) N Lammons (United States) J Withrow	6	7^{8}
(Italy) L Darderi (Austria) S Ofner	4	6^{6}
(India) S Balaji (United Kingdom) L Johnson	3	3
(India) Y Bhambri (France) A Olivetti	6	6
3	(France) S Doumbia (France) F Reboul	6^{4}	6	[10]
PR	(United States) C Harrison (France) F Martin	7^{7}	4	[8]
(Ecuador) D Hidalgo (Chile) A Tabilo	7^{7}	6^{5}	[10]
(Colombia) N Barrientos (Portugal) F Cabral	6^{4}	7^{7}	[5]
(Spain) P Martínez (Spain) J Munar	6	6
WC	(Austria) L Miedler (Austria) D Thiem	3	1
(United Kingdom) J Cash (United States) R Galloway	7^{7}	3	[10]
4	(Netherlands) R Haase (Argentina) A Molteni	6^{2}	6	[7]
(Germany) C Frantzen (Germany) H Jebens	6	6
(Mexico) S González (Mexico) MÁ Reyes-Varela	4	4
WC	(Jamaica) D Brown (Germany) D Masur	6	7^{7}
2	(Belgium) S Gillé (Belgium) J Vliegen	4	6^{4}

Quarterfinals
1	(United States) N Lammons (United States) J Withrow	7^{23}	6
(India) Y Bhambri (France) A Olivetti	6^{21}	4
3	(France) S Doumbia (France) F Reboul	3	4
(Ecuador) D Hidalgo (Chile) A Tabilo	6	6
(Spain) P Martínez (Spain) J Munar	1	2
(United Kingdom) J Cash (United States) R Galloway	6	6
(Germany) C Frantzen (Germany) H Jebens	4	6	[11]
WC	(Jamaica) D Brown (Germany) D Masur	6	3	[9]

Semifinals
1	(United States) N Lammons (United States) J Withrow	6^{3}	6^{5}
(Ecuador) D Hidalgo (Chile) A Tabilo	7^{7}	7^{7}
(United Kingdom) J Cash (United States) R Galloway	6^{3}	6	[10]
(Germany) C Frantzen (Germany) H Jebens	7^{7}	3	[8]

Final
(Ecuador) D Hidalgo (Chile) A Tabilo	4	4
(United Kingdom) J Cash (United States) R Galloway	6	6
