= Christopher Eubanks =

American professional tennis player (born 1996)

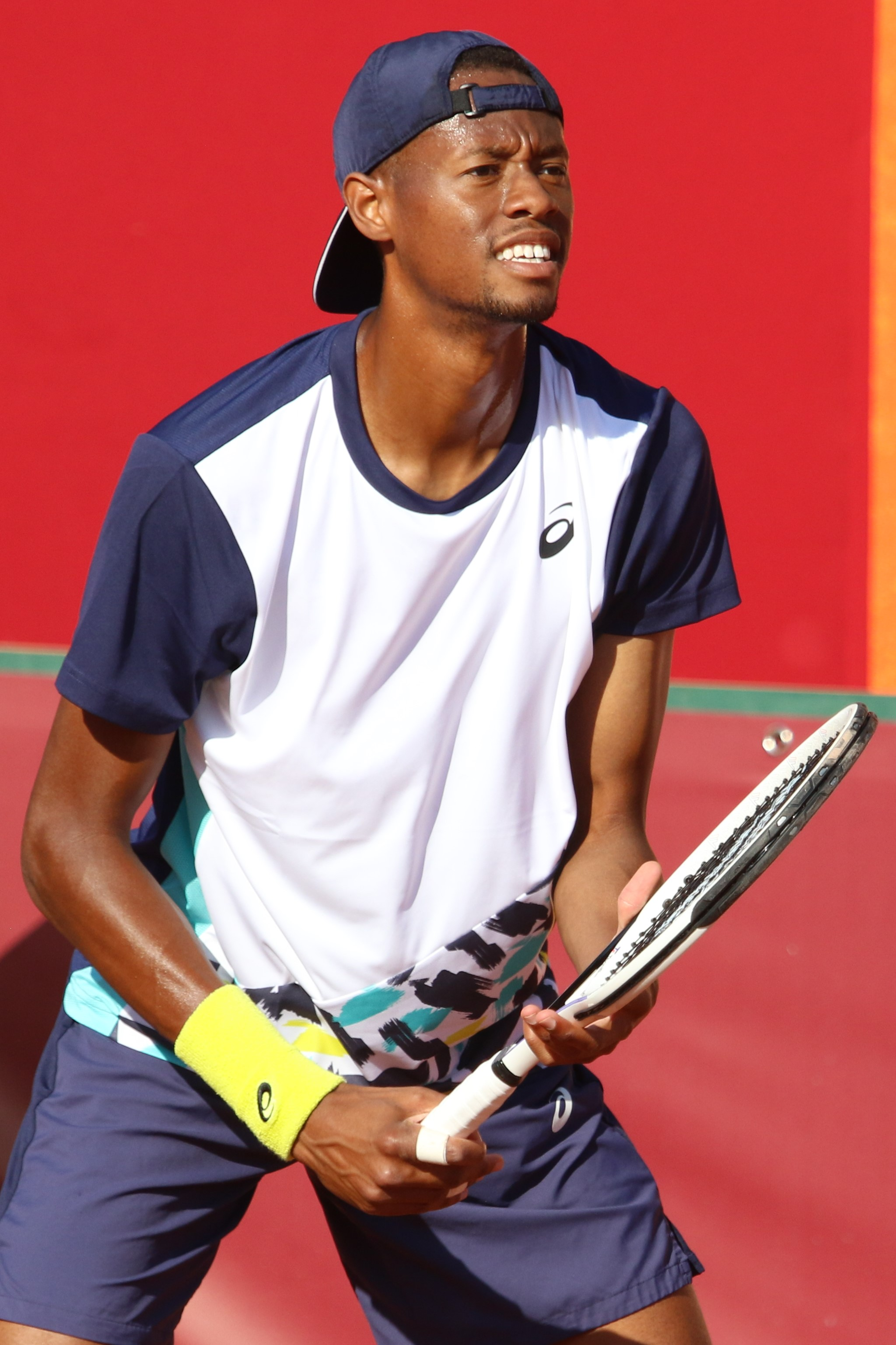
- Eubanks at the 2022 BNP Paribas Primrose Bordeaux
- Country (sports): United States
- Residence: Atlanta, Georgia, U.S.
- Born: May 5, 1996 (age 30) Atlanta, Georgia
- Height: 6 ft 7 in (201 cm)
- Turned pro: 2017
- Retired: 17 November 2025
- Plays: Right-handed (one-handed backhand)
- College: Georgia Tech
- Coach: Ruan Roelofse
- Prize money: US$ 3,834,282

Singles
- Career record: 44–68
- Career titles: 1
- Highest ranking: No. 29 (31 July 2023)

Grand Slam singles results
- Australian Open: 2R (2023, 2024)
- French Open: 1R (2023, 2024)
- Wimbledon: QF (2023)
- US Open: 2R (2022, 2023)

Other tournaments
- Olympic Games: 1R (2024)

Doubles
- Career record: 17–25
- Career titles: 0
- Highest ranking: No. 142 (12 August 2024)

Grand Slam doubles results
- Australian Open: 1R (2024)
- French Open: 2R (2024)
- Wimbledon: 3R (2024)
- US Open: QF (2020)

Grand Slam mixed doubles results
- US Open: 2R (2018)

Christopher Eubanks (/ˈjuːbæŋks/ YOO-banks; born May 5, 1996) is an American former professional tennis player. He had a career-high ATP singles ranking of No. 29, achieved on 31 July 2023 and a best doubles ranking of No. 142, reached on 12 August 2024. His most notable result was reaching the quarterfinals at the 2023 Wimbledon.

He won one ATP Tour title at the 2023 Mallorca Championships.

Eubanks played college tennis for the Georgia Tech Yellow Jackets. There, he was a two-time All-American and twice named ACC Player of the Year.

== Early life and background ==
Christopher is the son of Mark and Carla Eubanks and has one older brother, Mark. He was coached regularly by his father until he was 13.

Eubanks became close friends with Donald Young and his family after they moved from Chicago to Atlanta. Around when he started high school, he began training with Young's parents, who run the South Fulton Tennis Center near where Eubanks lived. During this time, he also had the opportunity to practice with Young, who was already in the Top 100 of the ATP rankings. Eubanks credited these practice sessions with helping him get on track to become a professional. He has said, "When I got around Donald and got to get better and better, that’s when I got back to, 'Maybe I could do this one day'." Eubanks travelled with Young who was his hitting partner from 2012 until Canada in 2017.

== Prep career ==
Eubanks played three seasons for Westlake High School. In both 2011 and 2013, he helped his team win the region championship and become runners-up in the state.

In 2013, Christopher earned a 48–6 overall juniors record. He advanced six rounds in the USTA Nationals at Kalamazoo. He won the Georgia State Closed Junior Challenger. Eubanks was also a member of the winning team at the USTA National Boys' 18 Team Championships.

== College ==
Eubanks played three seasons at Georgia Tech before forgoing his senior year of eligibility to turn pro.

=== Freshman season ===
Eubanks played at the top of Tech's lineup in 18 of GT's 27 dual matches and was ranked as high as No. 53 nationally in singles. He had a 7–11 record at the first singles position, and defeated players nationally ranked as high as No. 5. He received an at-large bid into the NCAA singles championship where he beat 31st-ranked Nathan Pasha of the University of Georgia in the opening round. Eubanks was named Second-team All-ACC.

That summer, Christopher was granted a wildcard into both singles and doubles main draws of the BB&T Atlanta Open. In doubles, he teamed up with fellow Atlanta-native Donald Young. The pair won their opening-round and quarterfinals matches before falling in the semis to the world's No. 1-ranked doubles team–Bob and Mike Bryan. In singles, Eubanks fell to Radek Štěpánek in the first round.

=== Sophomore season ===
Playing much of the year at the top of Tech's lineup, Eubanks finished with a record of 34–7 in all singles matches, which was the second-most wins in one year in program history. In singles, he finished the spring ranked No. 8 nationally. He reached the semifinals of the USTA/ITA National Indoor Championship after earning a wild-card bid. He was named first-team All-ACC, ITA All-American, and ACC Player of the Year.

In August, Christopher competed again in the BB&T Atlanta Open. With a doubles wild card, he and Zach Kennedy (GSU top player and former Westlake High teammate) won their first round match in the main draw against Yoshihito Nishioka and Thiago Monteiro. In singles, Eubanks earned a spot in the main draw after defeating Monteiro in qualifying in two sets.

=== Junior season ===
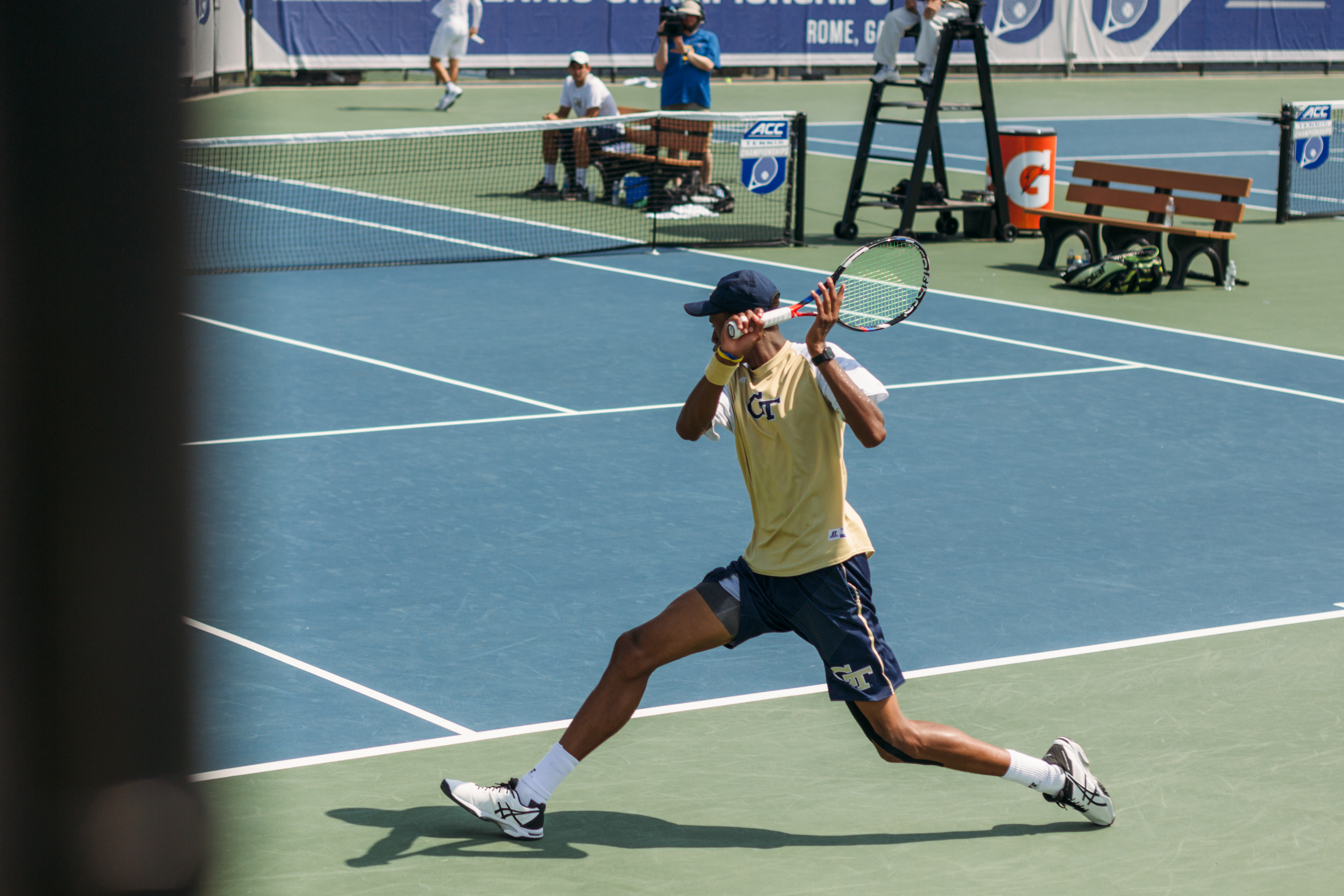
Eubanks competing at the 2017 ACC Championships in Rome, GA.

In his final season at Georgia Tech, Eubanks went 31–6 overall in singles–including 18 victories over ranked opponents. He reached his career-high national ranking of No. 4. For the second straight year, he advanced to the semifinals of the USTA/ITA National Indoors where he was awarded the USTA/ITA Sportsmanship Award–voted on by coaches and officials. Paired with Haley Carter of UNC, they won the mixed doubles title at the Oracle ITA Masters in Malibu, California. He earned his third-straight entry into the NCAA Singles Championship where he advanced to the quarterfinals before being defeated by the eventual champion, Thai-Son Kwiatkowski of Virginia. Eubanks received the National Div. I ITA/Arthur Ashe Leadership and Sportsmanship Award for the Southeast region and was again named ITA All-American and ACC Player of the Year.

For the third straight summer, he competed in the 2017 BB&T Atlanta Open. After earning a wildcard entry into the singles main draw, he reached the quarterfinals, earning his first two ATP singles victories including a three-set win over world No. 59 Jared Donaldson. A month later, he won his first US Open victory in doubles with partner Christian Harrison.

On October 23, 2017, Eubanks announced he would be turning professional and would not return for his senior season.

== Professional ==
=== 2015–2016: ATP Tour debut ===
Eubanks made his ATP Tour main draw singles debut at the 2015 Atlanta Open where he was defeated by Radek Štěpánek. The following year at the 2016 BB&T Atlanta Open, Eubanks lost to eventual semifinalist Reilly Opelka.

=== 2017–2019: Turned pro, major debut, first ATP wins & quarterfinal ===
Eubanks had his professional breakthrough at the 2017 Atlanta Open, defeating Taylor Fritz and Jared Donaldson to reach the quarterfinals.

Shortly after the performance, Eubanks received a wildcard to the 2017 US Open where he was defeated in the first round by Dudi Sela. At the same tournament, also as a wildcard he achieved his first US Open victory in doubles with partner Christian Harrison.

After winning three qualifying matches to gain entry into the main draw of the 2019 Australian Open, Eubanks lost in the first round to Georgian Nikoloz Basilashvili on his debut at this tournament.

=== 2020–2022: First major doubles quarterfinal & singles win at the US Open ===
Partnering with Mackenzie McDonald, Chris Eubanks reached his first major quarterfinal in doubles at the 2020 US Open.

He entered singles qualifying at Wimbledon 2021, where he lost in the first round to Viktor Troicki, who was playing his last professional tournament.

At the 2022 US Open, he recorded his first major win as a qualifier by defeating Pedro Martínez.

=== 2023: First ATP Tour title, major quarterfinal and first top 10 win, top 30 ===
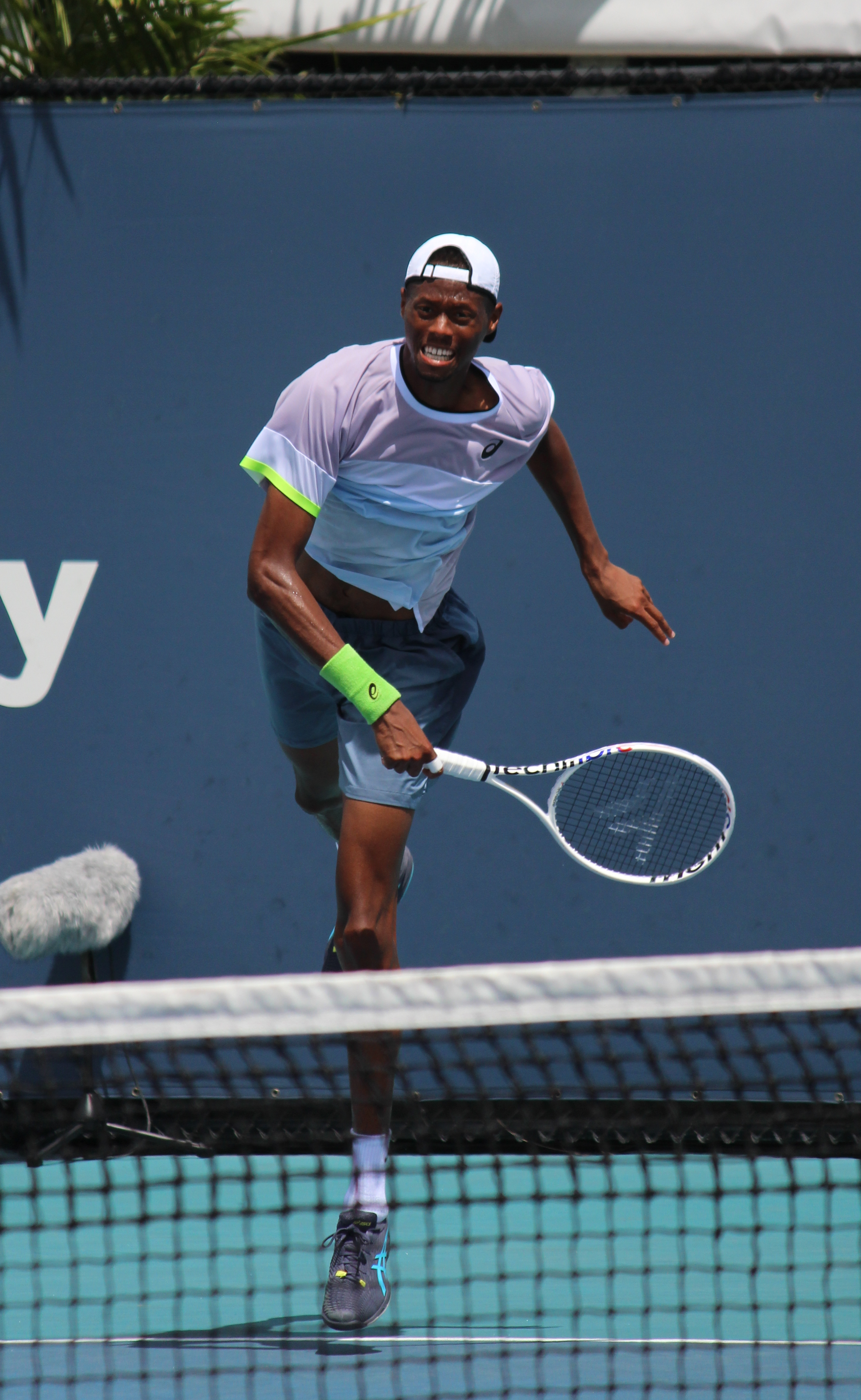
Eubanks at the 2023 Miami Open

He recorded his second major main draw win at the Australian Open defeating Kwon Soon-woo in five sets. He reached a new career-high ranking of No. 102 on February 13, 2023, before qualifying into the main draw at the Delray Beach Open where he lost to Aleksandar Vukic in the first round.

Ranked No. 119 at the Miami Open, Eubanks qualified for his third main draw by defeating wildcard Abedallah Shelbayh and Lukáš Klein, having gained entry as a wildcard in 2018 and 2019 (as his management company IMG owns the Miami Open). He advanced to the second round for the first time with a win over compatriot Denis Kudla. Next, he defeated 17th seed and world No. 20 Borna Ćorić for the biggest win in his career so far to move to the third round. He then went one step further, having never won three ATP matches in a row, and defeated Grégoire Barrère in straight sets to reach his first Masters fourth round. As a result, he made his debut in the top 100. He reached the quarterfinals defeating another Frenchman Adrian Mannarino in straight sets, his best result ever at a Masters. He lost to fourth seed Daniil Medvedev in the quarterfinals in straight sets.

In June, he qualified for his first grass European tournament, the Stuttgart Open. At the next tournament at Mallorca, Eubanks defeated Alex Michelsen, third seed Ben Shelton, and Arthur Rinderknech to reach his first ATP Tour-level semifinal. He then saved 5 match points to defeat Lloyd Harris in the semifinals and reach his first final at ATP Tour level. He defeated Adrian Mannarino in the final in straight sets to win his first ATP Tour title. As a result of this performance, he reached a new career high in the top 45 in the singles rankings, at world No. 43 on July 3, 2023.

In his Wimbledon Championships, he won his first match defeating Thiago Monteiro. In the second round he upset the 12th seed, Cameron Norrie to reach the third round at a major for the first time. He went one step further and defeated Christopher O'Connell to reach the second week of a Major for the first time. In the fourth round, he upset Stefanos Tsitsipas in five sets, his first top 10 and also top 5 win, and reached his first ever major quarterfinal. He lost to Daniil Medvedev in five sets. After Wimbledon, Eubanks improved his career-high ranking to No. 31 on 17 July 2023 and reached the top 30 two weeks later, at world No. 29.

In September, Eubanks participated in the 2023 Laver Cup as an alternate for Team World. Although he did not play in any of the main matches, he and fellow Team World alternate Milos Raonic defeated Team Europe's Alejandro Davidovich Fokina and Arthur Fils in an exhibition match that took place after Team World won enough points to win the title.

=== 2024: Hall of Fame Open semifinal, Olympics debut ===
Eubanks made it through to the quarterfinals at the Halle Open with wins over Pedro Martínez. and defending champion Alexander Bublik. He lost in the quarterfinals to Zhang Zhizhen despite serving for the match at 5-3 in the third set.

At the 2024 Hall of Fame Open, Eubanks reached the semifinals, defeating Ethan Quinn and Aleksandar Vukic before losing to eventual champion Marcos Giron.

=== 2025: Houston quarterfinal and retirement ===
At the U.S. Clay Court Championships, he recorded his second career clay court win and first in nearly seven years over Rinky Hijikata. He reached the quarterfinals after the retirement of Kei Nishikori in the second set. Eubanks announced his retirement from professional tennis in November 2025.

== Broadcast career ==
Eubanks is currently an on-air commentator and host with Tennis Channel.

Eubanks has experience as a tennis analyst for ESPN and TNT. He conducted on-court interviews at the 2025 and 2026 US Open Tennis Championships.

== Singles performance timeline ==
Key
W	F	SF	QF	#R	RR	Q#	DNQ	A	NH

(W) winner; (F) finalist; (SF) semifinalist; (QF) quarterfinalist; (#R) rounds 4, 3, 2, 1; (RR) round-robin stage; (Q#) qualification round; (DNQ) did not qualify; (A) absent; (NH) not held; (SR) strike rate (events won / competed); (W–L) win–loss record.
To avoid confusion and double counting, these charts are updated at the conclusion of a tournament or when the player's participation has ended.

Tournament	2015	2016	2017	2018	2019	2020	2021	2022	2023	2024	2025	SR	W–L
Grand Slam tournaments
Australian Open	A	A	A	A	1R	1R	Q1	Q2	2R	2R	Q3	0 / 4	2–4
French Open	A	A	A	Q1	Q1	Q2	Q1	Q1	1R	1R	Q1	0 / 2	0–2
Wimbledon	A	A	A	Q1	Q2	NH	Q1	Q2	QF	1R	1R	0 / 3	4–3
US Open	A	Q1	1R	Q2	1R	A	1R	2R	2R	1R	Q1	0 / 6	2–6
Win–loss	0–0	0–0	0–1	0–0	0–2	0–1	0–1	1–1	6–4	1–4	0–1	0 / 15	8–15
National representation
Summer Olympics	NH	A	NH				A	NH		1R	NH	0 / 1	0–1
ATP Masters 1000
Indian Wells Masters	A	A	A	A	Q2	NH	2R	2R	Q1	1R	Q1	0 / 3	2–3
Miami Open	A	A	A	1R	1R	NH	Q1	Q2	QF	3R	1R	0 / 5	5–5
Madrid Open	A	A	A	A	A	NH	A	A	A	1R	A	0 / 1	0–1
Italian Open	A	A	A	A	A	A	A	A	A	1R	A	0 / 1	0–1
Canadian Open	A	A	A	A	A	NH	A	A	1R	A	A	0 / 1	0–1
Cincinnati Masters	A	A	1R	A	A	A	A	A	1R	A	Q1	0 / 2	0–2
Shanghai Masters	A	A	A	A	A	NH			3R	A	Q2	0 / 1	1–1
Paris Masters	A	A	A	A	A	A	A	A	1R	A	A	0 / 1	0–1
Win–loss	0–0	0–0	0–1	0–1	0–1	0–0	1–1	1–1	5–5	1–4	0–1	0 / 15	8–15
Career statistics
Tournaments	1	1	3	1	6	1	4	6	21	19	6	69	
Titles	0	0	0	0	0	0	0	0	1	0	0	1	
Finals	0	0	0	0	0	0	0	0	1	0	0	1	
Overall win–loss	0–1	0–1	2–3	0–1	2–6	0–1	1–4	4–6	21–20	11–19	3–6	1 / 69	44–68
Year-end ranking	–	649	347	170	228	235	160	123	34	107		39%	

== ATP Tour finals ==
=== Singles: 1 (title) ===
Legend Grand Slam ATP 1000 ATP 500 ATP 250 (1–0)	Finals by surface Hard Clay Grass (1–0)	Finals by setting Outdoor (1–0) Indoor

Result	W–L	Date	Tournament	Tier	Surface	Opponent	Score
Win	1–0	Jun 2023	Mallorca Open, Spain	ATP 250	Grass	(France) Adrian Mannarino	6–1, 6–4

== ATP Challenger and ITF Tour finals ==
=== Singles: 10 (5 titles, 5 runner-ups) ===
Legend ATP Challenger Tour (4–3) ITF Futures (1–2)	Finals by surface Hard (5–5)

Result	W–L	Date	Tournament	Tier	Surface	Opponent	Score
Loss	0–1	Apr 2018	Jalisco Open, Mexico	Challenger	Hard	(El Salvador) Marcelo Arévalo	4–6, 7–5, 6–7^{(4–7)}
Win	1–1	Apr 2018	Torneo Internacional Challenger León, Mexico	Challenger	Hard	(Australia) John-Patrick Smith	6–4, 3–6, 7–6^{(7–4)}
Win	2–1	Jun 2021	Orlando Open, US	Challenger	Hard	(Colombia) Nicolás Mejía	2–6, 7–6^{(7–3)}, 6–4
Win	3–1	Nov 2021	Knoxville Challenger, US	Challenger	Hard (i)	(Germany) Daniel Altmaier	6–3, 6–4
Loss	3–2	Oct 2022	Charlottesville Men's Pro Challenger, US	Challenger	Hard (i)	(United States) Ben Shelton	6–7^{(4–7)}, 5–7
Loss	3–3	Nov 2022	Knoxville Challenger, US	Challenger	Hard (i)	(United States) Ben Shelton	3–6, 6–1, 6–7^{(4–7)}
Win	4–3	Nov 2024	Knoxville Challenger, US (2)	Challenger	Hard (i)	(United States) Learner Tien	7–5, 7–6^{(11–9)}

Result	W–L	Date	Tournament	Tier	Surface	Opponent	Score
Win	1–0	Jun 2017	US F17, Winston-Salem	Futures	Hard	(United States) Kevin King	7–5, 2–6, 7–6^{(8–6)}
Loss	1–1	Jun 2017	US F18, Winston-Salem	Futures	Hard	(United States) Tommy Paul	4–6, 4–6
Loss	1–2	Jan 2018	US F1, Los Angeles	Futures	Hard	(Brazil) Karuê Sell	7–6^{(7–5)}, 2–6, 2–6

=== Doubles: 7 (4 titles, 3 runner-ups) ===
Legend ATP Challenger Tour (3–2) ITF Futures (1–1)	Finals by surface Hard (4–3)

Result	W–L	Date	Tournament	Tier	Surface	Partner	Opponents	Score
Win	1–0	Oct 2017	Monterrey Challenger, Mexico	Challenger	Hard	(United States) Evan King	(El Salvador) Marcelo Arévalo (Mexico) Miguel Ángel Reyes-Varela	7–6^{(7–4)}, 6–3
Loss	1–1	July 2019	Nielsen Pro Tennis Championships, US	Challenger	Hard	(United States) Thai-Son Kwiatkowski	(United States) Bradley Klahn (United States) J.C. Aragone	5–7, 4–6
Win	2–1	Nov 2019	JSM Challenger of Champaign–Urbana, US	Challenger	Hard (i)	(United States) Kevin King	(United Kingdom) Evan Hoyt (United States) Martin Redlicki	7–5, 6–3
Win	3–1	Mar 2021	Saint Petersburg Challenger, Russia	Challenger	Hard (i)	(Ecuador) Roberto Quiroz	(Netherlands) Jesper de Jong (Netherlands) Sem Verbeek	6–4, 6–3
Loss	3–2	Jun 2021	Little Rock Challenger, US	Challenger	Hard	(Ecuador) Roberto Quiroz	(Colombia) Nicolás Barrientos (United States) Ernesto Escobedo	6–4, 3–6, [5–10]

Result	W–L	Date	Tournament	Tier	Surface	Partner	Opponents	Score
Loss	0–1	Jun 2017	US F17, Winston-Salem	Futures	Hard	(United States) Kevin King	(United States) Riley Smith (United States) Brandon Holt	6–7^{(4–7)}, 3–6
Win	1–1	Jun 2017	US F19, Winston-Salem	Futures	Hard	(United States) Kevin King	(Germany) Dominik Koepfer (Venezuela) Luis David Martínez	6–3, 6–4

== Wins over top 10 players ==
- Eubanks had a 1–9 record against players who were, at the time the match was played, ranked in the top 10.

Season	2015–22	2023	Total
Wins	0	1	1

#	Player	Rank	Event	Surface	Rd	Score	CER	Ref
2023
1.	(Greece) Stefanos Tsitsipas	5	Wimbledon, United Kingdom	Grass	4R	3–6, 7–6^{(7–4)}, 3–6, 6–4, 6–4	43	

== See also ==
- List of Georgia Institute of Technology athletes
