= Mallorca Open =

Mallorca Championships

Tournament information
- Event name: Vanda Pharmaceuticals Mallorca Championships
- Founded: 2016 (WTA); 2021 (ATP)
- Location: Santa Ponsa, Mallorca; Spain
- Venue: Mallorca Country Club
- Surface: Grass – outdoors
- Draw: 28S / 16Q / 16D
- Website: mallorca-championships.com

Current champions (2026)
- Men's singles: (Spain) Alejandro Davidovich Fokina
- Men's doubles: (France) Théo Arribagé (France) Albano Olivetti
ATP Tour
- Category: ATP 250 (2021–present)
- Prize money: €915,630 (2023)
WTA Tour
- Category: WTA International (2016–2019); WTA 125k (2025–present)

The Mallorca Championships, sponsored by Vanda Pharmaceuticals, is an ATP Tour professional tennis tournament. Classified as an ATP 250 event, it is held annually at the outdoor grass courts of Mallorca Country Club in Santa Ponsa, Mallorca, Spain in June, a week prior to the Wimbledon Championships.

The event was initially founded as a tournament on the WTA Tour. In June 2014, the Women's Tennis Association (WTA) announced that a new grass court tennis tournament would be organized in Mallorca, beginning in 2016, as the WTA Tour would expand the grass court swing between the French Open and Wimbledon from two weeks to three. The new tennis complex would have five natural grass courts, with construction and maintenance contributions from the All England Lawn Tennis and Croquet Club (AELTC). Classified as a WTA International event, the women's tournament lasted for three years on the calendar and ended after the last edition in June 2019, with the event's sanction and International classification transferred to the Birmingham Classic for the following year.

In September 2019, the AELTC announced that they would invest in several new grass tennis tournaments for the ATP Tour and WTA Tour. Among the new investments included a new men's event in Mallorca for a debut in 2020, marking a return of the ATP to Mallorca after 18 years, and be organized on the existing tennis complex. The new event would be headed by Toni Nadal and be held during the grass swing's third and final week. After the COVID-19 pandemic forced the postponement of the relaunched ATP tournament, it held its inaugural edition in 2021.

== Past results ==
=== Men's singles ===
Year	Champions	Runners-up	Score
↓ ATP Tour 250 ↓
2021	(Russia) Daniil Medvedev	(United States) Sam Querrey	6–4, 6–2
2022	(Greece) Stefanos Tsitsipas	(Spain) Roberto Bautista Agut	6–4, 3–6, 7–6^{(7–2)}
2023	(United States) Christopher Eubanks	(France) Adrian Mannarino	6–1, 6–4
2024	(Chile) Alejandro Tabilo	(Austria) Sebastian Ofner	6–3, 6–4
2025	(Netherlands) Tallon Griekspoor	(France) Corentin Moutet	7–5, 7–6^{(7–3)}
2026	(Spain) Alejandro Davidovich Fokina	(United States) Ethan Quinn	7–6^{(7–4)}, 6–3

=== Women's singles ===
Year	Champions	Runners-up	Score
↓ WTA International ↓
2016	(France) Caroline Garcia	(Latvia) Anastasija Sevastova	6–3, 6–4
2017	(Latvia) Anastasija Sevastova	(Germany) Julia Görges	6–4, 3–6, 6–3
2018	(Germany) Tatjana Maria	(Latvia) Anastasija Sevastova	6–4, 7–5
2019	(United States) Sofia Kenin	(Switzerland) Belinda Bencic	6–7^{(2–7)}, 7–6^{(7–5)}, 6–4
↓ WTA 125 ↓ as Mallorca Women's Championships
2025	(Argentina) Solana Sierra	(Serbia) Lola Radivojević	6–3, 6–1

=== Men's doubles ===
Year	Champions	Runners-up	Score
↓ ATP Tour 250 ↓
2021	(Italy) Simone Bolelli (Argentina) Máximo González	(Serbia) Novak Djokovic (Spain) Carlos Gómez-Herrera	Walkover
2022	(Brazil) Rafael Matos (Spain) David Vega Hernández	(Uruguay) Ariel Behar (Ecuador) Gonzalo Escobar	7–6^{(7–5)}, 6–7^{(6–8)}, [10–1]
2023	(India) Yuki Bhambri (South Africa) Lloyd Harris	(Netherlands) Robin Haase (Austria) Philipp Oswald	6–3, 6–4
2024	(United Kingdom) Julian Cash (United States) Robert Galloway	(Ecuador) Diego Hidalgo (Chile) Alejandro Tabilo	6–4, 6–4
2025	(Mexico) Santiago González (United States) Austin Krajicek	(India) Yuki Bhambri (United States) Robert Galloway	6–1, 1–6, [15–13]
2026	(France) Théo Arribagé (France) Albano Olivetti	(Sweden) André Göransson (United States) Evan King	7–6^{(8–6)}, 3–6, [11–9]

=== Women's doubles ===
Year	Champions	Runners-up	Score
↓ WTA International ↓
2016	(Canada) Gabriela Dabrowski (Spain) María José Martínez Sánchez	(Germany) Anna-Lena Friedsam (Germany) Laura Siegemund	6–4, 6–2
2017	(Chinese Taipei) Chan Yung-jan (Switzerland) Martina Hingis	(Serbia) Jelena Janković (Latvia) Anastasija Sevastova	Walkover
2018	(Slovenia) Andreja Klepač (Spain) María José Martínez Sánchez (2)	(Czech Republic) Lucie Šafářová (Czech Republic) Barbora Štefková	6–1, 3–6, [10–3]
2019	(Belgium) Kirsten Flipkens (Sweden) Johanna Larsson	(Spain) María José Martínez Sánchez (Spain) Sara Sorribes Tormo	6–2, 6–4
↓ WTA 125 ↓ as Mallorca Women's Championships
2025	(Czech Republic) Jesika Malečková (Czech Republic) Miriam Škoch	(Germany) Noma Noha Akugue (Germany) Mariella Thamm	6–4, 6–0

== See also ==
- List of tennis tournaments
