= Alejandro Tabilo =

Chilean tennis player (born 1997)

- Tabilo at the 2025 French Open
- Country (sports): Canada (pre-2017); Chile (since 2017)
- Born: 2 June 1997 (age 29) Toronto, Ontario, Canada
- Height: 1.88 m (6 ft 2 in)
- Turned pro: 2015
- Plays: Left-handed (two-handed backhand)
- Coach: Germán Gaich (Feb 2026–), Juan Pablo Gandara
- Prize money: US $6,505,647

Singles
- Career record: 94–95
- Career titles: 3
- Highest ranking: No. 19 (1 July 2024)
- Current ranking: No. 31 (9 November 2026)

Grand Slam singles results
- Australian Open: 2R (2020)
- French Open: 4R (2026)
- Wimbledon: 3R (2024)
- US Open: 3R (2026)

Other tournaments
- Olympic Games: 1R (2024)

Doubles
- Career record: 32–38
- Career titles: 1
- Highest ranking: No. 106 (27 January 2025)
- Current ranking: No. 207 (21 September 2026)

Grand Slam doubles results
- French Open: 3R (2026)
- Wimbledon: 1R (2022, 2024, 2026)
- US Open: 1R (2024)

Other doubles tournaments
- Olympic Games: 2R (2024)

Team competitions
- Davis Cup: 9–12
Medal record
Men's tennis
Representing Chile
Pan American Games
Silver medal – second place	2023 Santiago	Doubles
South American Games
Bronze medal – third place	2022 Asunción	Singles
- Last updated on: 21 September 2026.

Alejandro Tabilo Álvarez (born 2 June 1997) is a Canadian-born Chilean professional tennis player. He has a career-high ATP singles ranking of world No. 19 achieved on 1 July 2024 and a best doubles ranking of No. 106 achieved on 27 January 2025. He is the current No. 1 singles player from Chile.

Tabilo has won four ATP Tour titles combined, three in singles and one in doubles. He represents Chile at the Davis Cup.

== Personal life ==
Alejandro Tabilo Álvarez was born in Toronto, Canada on June 2, 1997. His parents are Chileans; his father Ricardo, a native of Antofagasta, settled in North America in 1988, where he met his mother María, who is from San Felipe. After obtaining dual nationality, he traveled to Santiago for the first time at age 18 to compete, taking the opportunity to get to know the country. He decided to stay in Chile for a year, being taken in by Julio Rueda and Patricia Farías, a couple who helped introduce him to Chilean culture. At age 19, he settled in Chile permanently, though he had always dreamed of representing the country of his parents.

== Playing style ==
Tabilo is a left-handed player with a two-handed backhand. He prefers clay courts and uses a Yonex VCore 98 racket strung with Yonex Polytour Spin strings at a tension of around 23 kilograms. His childhood idol has been Rafael Nadal, and another major influence is former Chilean star Fernando González. Both Nadal and former world No. 1 Boris Becker have spoken highly of Tabilo's game. His most difficult opponent on the ATP circuit has been Taylor Fritz, against whom he holds a 0–4 record.

== Career ==
=== Early career and junior years ===
Tabilo trained at the IMG Academy in the United States between 2011 and 2015. He won the Orange Bowl under-16 doubles title in 2012. During 2018, he struggled with weight issues, at one point weighing close to 100 kilograms, and suffered lower back pain that dropped his ranking to around No. 800. He subsequently lost weight too quickly, reaching an unhealthy 65 kilograms, which forced a four-month absence from competition. After an intensive fitness program, he stabilized around 75 kilograms and returned to competition ahead of a strong 2019 season.

=== 2019: Davis Cup debut ===
In 2019, ahead of the Davis Cup Finals, Tabilo was called up to the Chilean Davis Cup team for the first time. He played a doubles rubber alongside Tomás Barrios Vera against Germany, losing in two sets.

=== 2020: ATP Cup, Grand Slam debut, top 200 ===
Tabilo participated at the 2020 ATP Cup with the Chilean team as the No. 2 player, making his debut in the competition.

At his second tournament of the year, Tabilo qualified for his first Grand Slam main draw at the 2020 Australian Open. He defeated fellow qualifier Daniel Elahi Galán in five sets for his first Grand Slam main draw win, before losing to John Isner in straight sets in the second round. As a result, he reached the top 200, climbing to world No. 172 on 3 February 2020.

Tabilo played in his home-country tournament, the 2020 Chile Open, as a wildcard, defeating Paolo Lorenzi in the first round before losing to Casper Ruud in the second.

On 14 September 2020, Tabilo reached a career-high ranking of world No. 156, finishing the year at No. 169.

=== 2021: Masters debut and first win, first Challenger title, top 150 ===
Tabilo attempted to repeat his Australian Open qualifying run but lost in the first qualifying round of the 2021 Australian Open to Hugo Dellien. At the 2021 Chile Open, he earned a main draw spot through qualifying and won his first-round match against Jozef Kovalík, before losing to fellow Chilean and eventual champion Cristian Garín in the second round.

In March, Tabilo qualified for the main draw of the 2021 Miami Open, his first Masters 1000 tournament, where he lost to Mikael Ymer in the first round.

In July, Tabilo reached his first Challenger final at the Lexington Challenger, where he lost the title to Jason Kubler.

In October, Tabilo qualified for the main draw of the Indian Wells Open and earned his first Masters 1000 win, defeating Denis Kudla. He then lost to Matteo Berrettini in the second round, his first match against a top-10 player.

The following month, Tabilo won his first Challenger title at Guayaquil, Ecuador, defeating Jesper de Jong in the final. The title lifted him to a career-high ranking of world No. 140 on 8 November 2021, making him the No. 2 Chilean singles player.

=== 2022: First ATP final, top 65, Chilean No. 1 ===
Tabilo participated in the 2022 ATP Cup, where Chile defeated Norway (he won his singles match against Viktor Durasovic) and Serbia in both singles and doubles—partnering Tomás Barrios Vera—but lost to Spain, with Chile finishing second in Group A.

Tabilo qualified for the 2022 Australian Open after victories over Australian local James McCabe, Constant Lestienne, and Elias Ymer. He lost to 31st seed Carlos Alcaraz in the first round.

In February, he reached his first ATP final at the Córdoba Open as a qualifier, defeating Francisco Cerúndolo, Carlos Taberner, Sebastián Báez, and world No. 14 and top seed Diego Schwartzman each in straight sets. He lost the final to Albert Ramos-Viñolas 6–4, 3–6, 4–6, despite holding a double break lead at 4–1 in the third set.

At the 2022 Chile Open, he reached the semifinals as a wildcard, defeating top seed and compatriot Cristian Garín in the second round and sixth seed Miomir Kecmanović in the quarterfinals. He made his top 100 debut at world No. 98 on 28 February 2022.

In May, he qualified directly for a Grand Slam main draw for the first time, entering the 2022 French Open. Hours before his debut, however, he withdrew due to a fracture in his left arm.

He made his Wimbledon debut and recorded his first win there, defeating Laslo Đere in a tight five-set match decided by a super tiebreak. He reached a career-high ranking of world No. 68 on 18 July 2022, and a week later climbed to another career high of No. 64, becoming the Chilean player ranked No. 1.

He also recorded his first win at the US Open, defeating Kamil Majchrzak.

=== 2023: Masters fourth round, four Challenger titles ===
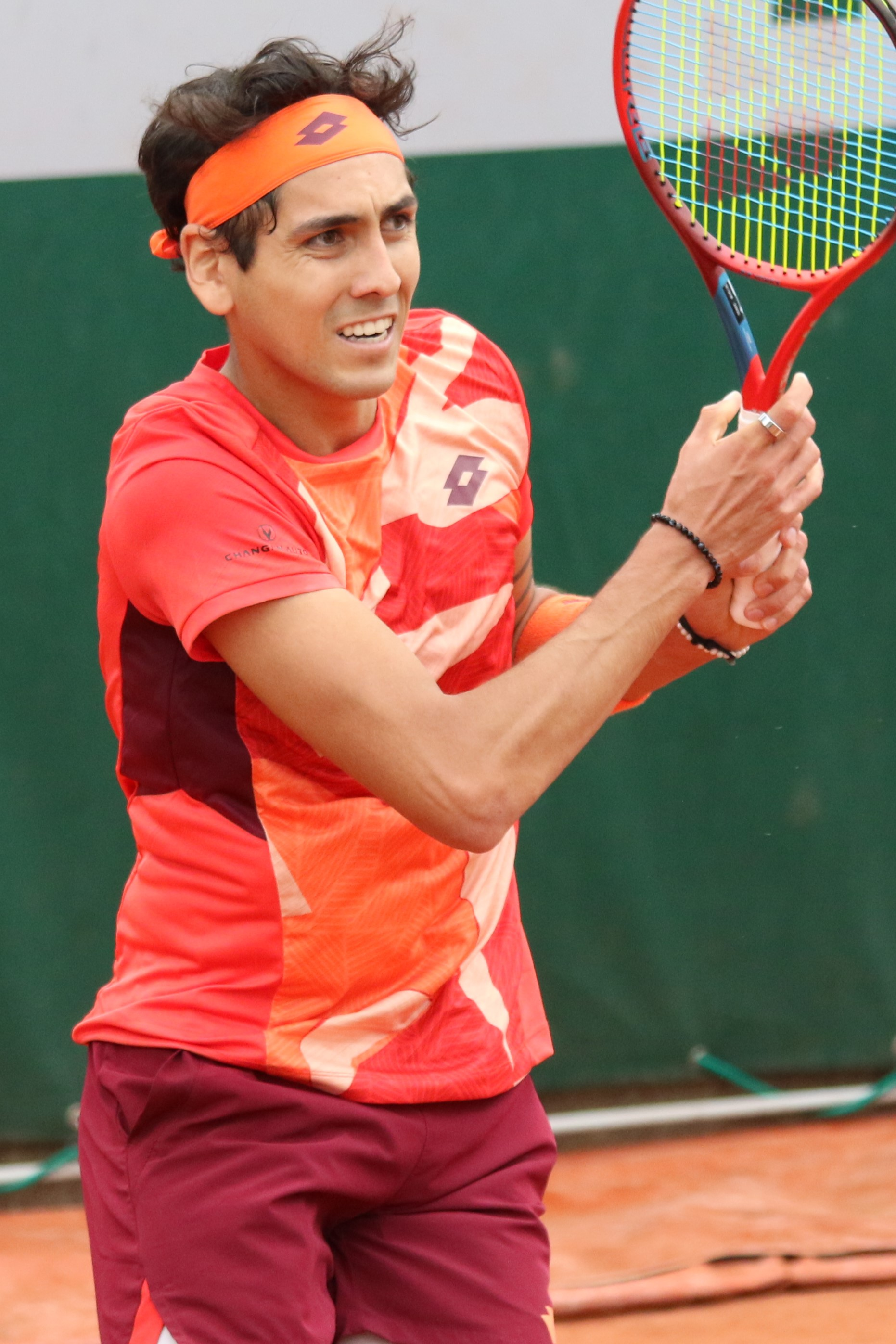
Tabilo at the 2023 French Open

At the 2023 BNP Paribas Open as a qualifier, Tabilo reached the fourth round of a Masters for the first time in his career, defeating qualifier Maximilian Marterer, 32nd seed Maxime Cressy, and Jordan Thompson. Despite this run, he dropped out of the top 175 on 17 April 2023.

Tabilo fared much better on the Challenger Tour, winning four titles between May and November and returning to the top 100, finishing the year at world No. 85—his highest year-end ranking.

=== 2024: Two titles, win over world No. 1, top 20, Latin American No. 1 ===
At the 2024 ASB Classic, Tabilo reached the final as a qualifier—aided by a walkover from Cameron Norrie in the quarterfinals and a straight-set win over sixth seed Arthur Fils in the semifinals—before defeating Taro Daniel in straight sets to claim his first ATP Tour title. The win made him the first Chilean to win a hardcourt ATP title since Fernando González in 2007 in Beijing, and only the third active Chilean ATP singles champion alongside Cristian Garín and Nicolás Jarry. He entered the top 50 on 15 January 2024 and became the Chilean No. 2 player.

At his home tournament, the 2024 Chile Open in Santiago, he reached the singles final and won his first ATP doubles title with compatriot Tomas Barrios Vera, defeating Matias Soto and Orlando Luz. As a result, he broke into the top 40 in singles.

Tabilo then won the 2024 Open Aix Provence Challenger in France, defeating Jaume Munar in straight sets and moving into the top 35. He became the first player that season to win titles on both the ATP Tour and the ATP Challenger Tour.

The following week at the 2024 Italian Open, seeded 29th, Tabilo received a bye into the second round and then defeated Yannick Hanfmann to reach the third round. He then stunned world No. 1 Novak Djokovic in straight sets—the biggest win of his career—to reach the fourth round. It was also Tabilo's first victory over a top-10 player. He became the first Chilean to beat a world No. 1 in 17 years, since Fernando González defeated Roger Federer at the 2007 Nitto Finals.

He continued his run by defeating 16th seed Karen Khachanov to reach the quarterfinals of a Masters for the first time, then beating Zhang Zhizhen to reach the first Masters 1000 semifinal of his career—the first Chilean to reach that stage at the Italian Open since González in 2009. It was also the first time two Chilean players—Tabilo and Nicolás Jarry—had reached the semifinals of the same Masters 1000 event, and the first time at any ATP Tour event since Fernando González and Nicolás Massú at Viña del Mar in 2006. Tabilo lost in the semifinals to third seed Alexander Zverev in three sets. As a result, he entered the top 25 on 20 May 2024.

At the 2024 Mallorca Championships, Tabilo reached his third final of the season and fourth of his career, defeating sixth seed Gaël Monfils in the semifinals. He then defeated Sebastian Ofner in the final to win his second ATP title and first on grass, becoming the first Chilean man in the Open Era to win a grass court title. He entered the top 20 on 1 July 2024, reaching a career-high of world No. 19, and displaced Nicolás Jarry as the Chilean No. 1. Tabilo became the eighth Chilean man ever to be ranked in the top 20. He also reached his second career doubles final at Mallorca, partnering Diego Hidalgo.

At Wimbledon, Tabilo defeated local wildcard Dan Evans in the first round in straight sets, then fought back from two sets down to defeat Flavio Cobolli in five sets. He was eliminated in the third round by Taylor Fritz in three sets, ending a run of six consecutive wins on grass.

Following his first-round exit at the 2024 Summer Olympics in Paris, Tabilo—seeded 15th—reached the round of 16 at the 2024 National Bank Open in Montreal with wins over Frances Tiafoe and Lorenzo Sonego. He became the Latin American No. 1 player on 26 August 2024. At the 2024 Almaty Open, he reached the quarterfinals before losing to eventual finalist Gabriel Diallo.

=== 2025: Second top-5 win, third ATP title, return to top 75 ===
Tabilo began 2025 poorly, losing his opening five matches of the year and missing two months of the European clay swing due to a wrist injury. His sole highlight during the first half of the year came at the 2025 Monte-Carlo Masters, where he again defeated former two-time champion Novak Djokovic, recording his second top-5 win. He became only the third player—after Marat Safin and Jiří Veselý—never to have lost against the former world No. 1 in multiple ATP-level meetings. He was also the ninth player ever to win his first two career meetings against Djokovic, joining Federer, Nadal, Safin, Coria, Verdasco, Kyrgios, Rochus, and Veselý.

Signs of a revival emerged during the Asian swing. Tabilo first reached the Challenger final in Guangzhou before qualifying for the 2025 Chengdu Open main draw and going on to win the title, entering with a 5–13 record for the season and upsetting top seed Lorenzo Musetti in an eventful final. He saved two match points while serving at 5–6 in the third set, then recovered from 1–4 down in the deciding tiebreak to win 6–3, 2–6, 7–6(5), becoming the second-lowest-ranked ATP Tour champion of the season. The title climbed him 40 positions in the rankings, returning him to the top 75 and top 100. The following week at the Shanghai Masters, he won his first-round match over Marcos Giron but lost in the second round to 12th seed Félix Auger-Aliassime 6–3, 6–3. He finished the year ranked No. 82.

=== 2026: Rio Open final, Davis Cup, Challenger title ===
In February, Tabilo returned to the Davis Cup, defeating Serbia's Ognjen Milić 6–7(3), 6–2, 6–4 as Chile swept the qualifying tie 4–0. He then enjoyed a strong South American clay swing, defeating defending Argentina Open champion João Fonseca in the second round in Buenos Aires 6–3, 3–6, 7–5, before losing in the quarterfinals to Tomás Martín Etcheverry. At the 2026 Rio Open, an ATP 500 event, he battled through three three-set matches to reach the final—his first at ATP 500 level—where he lost to Etcheverry 6–3, 6–7(3), 4–6.

At the Indian Wells Open, Tabilo defeated Rafael Jodar 6–1, 6–2 in just 58 minutes—the fastest win of his ATP career—before losing in the second round to eventual finalist Daniil Medvedev. He also reached the third round of the 2026 Miami Open. On the European clay swing, Tabilo won his seventh Challenger title at the 2026 Open Aix Provence, defeating Zizou Bergs 6–4, 4–6, 6–3 in the final.

== Performance timelines ==
Key
W	F	SF	QF	#R	RR	Q#	P#	DNQ	A	Z#	PO	G	S	B	NMS	NTI	P	NH

(W) winner; (F) finalist; (SF) semifinalist; (QF) quarterfinalist; (#R) rounds 4, 3, 2, 1; (RR) round-robin stage; (Q#) qualification round; (P#) preliminary round; (DNQ) did not qualify; (A) absent; (Z#) Davis/Fed Cup Zonal Group (with number indication) or (PO) play-off; (G) gold, (S) silver or (B) bronze Olympic/Paralympic medal; (NMS) not a Masters tournament; (NTI) not a Tier I tournament; (P) postponed; (NH) not held; (SR) strike rate (events won / competed); (W–L) win–loss record.
To avoid confusion and double counting, these charts are updated at the conclusion of a tournament or when the player's participation has ended.

=== Singles ===
Tournament	2019	2020	2021	2022	2023	2024	2025	2026	SR	W–L	Win %
Grand Slam tournaments
Australian Open	A	2R	Q1	1R	Q2	1R	1R	1R	0 / 5	1–5	17%
French Open	A	A	Q3	A	Q3	1R	2R	4R	0 / 3	3–3	50%
Wimbledon	A	NH	Q2	2R	Q1	3R	A	1R	0 / 3	3–3	50%
US Open	A	A	Q1	2R	Q1	1R	1R	3R	0 / 4	3–4	43%
Win–loss	0–0	1–1	0–0	2–3	0–0	2–4	1–3	2–2	0 / 15	10–15	40%
National representation											
Summer Olympics	NH		A	NH		1R	NH		0 / 1	0–1	
Davis Cup	RR	WG1		WG1	RR	RR	A		0 / 4	6–6	
ATP Masters 1000
Indian Wells Open	A	NH	2R	A	4R	2R	3R	2R	0 / 5	7–5	58%
Miami Open	A	NH	1R	A	Q2	2R	3R	3R	0 / 4	4–4	50%
Monte-Carlo Masters	A	NH	A	A	A	2R	3R	2R	0 / 3	4–3	57%
Madrid Open	A	NH	A	Q2	A	1R	A	2R	0 / 2	1–2	33%
Italian Open	A	A	A	A	A	SF	A	2R	0 / 2	5–2	71%
Canadian Open	A	NH	A	A	A	3R	A	2R	0 /2	2–2	50%
Cincinnati Open	A	A	A	A	A	1R	1R	3R	0 /3	1–3	25%
Shanghai Masters	A	NH			A	3R	2R	2R	0 /3	2–3	40%
Paris Masters	A	A	A	A	A	2R	A	1R	0 / 2	1–2	33%
Win–loss	0–0	0–0	1–2	0–0	3–1	11–9	5–5	7–9	0 /26	27–26	51%
Career statistics											
	2019	2020	2021	2022	2023	2024	2025	2026	Career		
Tournaments	0	3	4	14	4	25	18	13	81		
Titles / Finals	0 / 0	0 / 0	0 / 0	0 / 1	0 / 0	2 / 3	1 / 1	0 / 1	3 / 6		
Overall win–loss	0–0	3–3	2–4	17–16	3–5	32–27	12–17	18–13	87–85		
Year-end ranking	213	169	139	100	85	23	82		$5,771,859		

=== Doubles ===
Tournament	2019	2020	2021	2022	2023	2024	2025	2026	SR	W–L
Grand Slam tournaments
Australian Open	A	A	A	A	A	A	A		0 / 0	0–0
French Open	A	A	A	1R (Note: Tabilo and Tomás Martín Etcheverry withdrew before round 1 so it doesn't count as a loss)	A	1R	A		0 / 2	0–1
Wimbledon	A	NH	A	1R	A	1R	A		0 / 2	0–2
US Open	A	A	A	A	A	1R	A		0 / 1	0–1
Win–loss	0–0	0–0	0–0	0–1	0–0	0–3	0–0	0–0	0 / 5	0–4
National representation
Davis Cup	RR	WG1		WG1	RR	RR	A		0 / 3	4–6
ATP Cup	NH	RR	A	RR	not held				0 / 2	3–1
Career statistics
	2019	2020	2021	2022	2023	2024	2025	2026	Career	
Tournaments	1	3	1	5	1	12	6	0	29	
Titles / Finals	0 / 1	0 / 0	0 / 0	0 / 0	0 / 0	1 / 2	0 / 0	0 / 0	1 / 3	
Overall win–loss	0–1	3–2	1–2	4–4	4–2	14–11	2–6	0–0	28–28	
Year-end ranking	519	256	296	476	876	109	364			

== ATP Tour finals ==
=== Singles: 6 (3 titles, 3 runners-up) ===
Legend Grand Slam (–) ATP 1000 (–) ATP 500 (0–1) ATP 250 (3–2)	Finals by surface Hard (2–0) Clay (0–3) Grass (1–0)	Finals by setting Outdoor (3–3) Indoor (–)

Result	W–L	Date	Tournament	Tier	Surface	Opponent	Score
Loss	0–1	Feb 2022	Córdoba Open, Argentina	ATP 250	Clay	(Spain) Albert Ramos Viñolas	6–4, 3–6, 4–6
Win	1–1	Jan 2024	Auckland Open, New Zealand	ATP 250	Hard	(Japan) Taro Daniel	6–2, 7–5
Loss	1–2	Mar 2024	Chile Open, Chile	ATP 250	Clay	(Argentina) Sebastián Báez	6–3, 0–6, 4–6
Win	2–2	Jun 2024	Mallorca Championships, Spain	ATP 250	Grass	(Austria) Sebastian Ofner	6–3, 6–4
Win	3–2	Sep 2025	Chengdu Open, China	ATP 250	Hard	(Italy) Lorenzo Musetti	6–3, 2–6, 7–6^{(7–5)}
Loss	3–3	Feb 2026	Rio Open, Brazil	ATP 500	Clay	(Argentina) Tomás Martín Etcheverry	6–3, 6–7^{(3–7)}, 4–6

=== Doubles: 2 (1 title, 1 runner-up) ===
Legend Grand Slam (–) ATP 1000 (–) ATP 500 (–) ATP 250 (1–1)	Finals by surface Hard (–) Clay (1–0) Grass (0–1)	Finals by setting Outdoor (1–1) Indoor (–)

Result	W–L	Date	Tournament	Tier	Surface	Partner	Opponents	Score
Win	1–0	Mar 2024	Chile Open, Chile	ATP 250	Clay	(Chile) Tomás Barrios Vera	(Brazil) Orlando Luz (Chile) Matías Soto	6–2, 6–4
Loss	1–1	Jun 2024	Mallorca Championships, Spain	ATP 250	Grass	(Ecuador) Diego Hidalgo	(United Kingdom) Julian Cash (United States) Robert Galloway	4–6, 4–6

== ATP Challenger Tour finals ==
=== Singles: 13 (7 titles, 6 runners-up) ===
Finals by surface
Hard (1–3)
Clay (6–3)

Result	W–L	Date	Tournament	Tier	Surface	Opponent	Score
Loss	0–1	Jul 2021	Kentucky Tennis Championships, US	Challenger	Hard	(Australia) Jason Kubler	5–7, 7–6^{(7–2)}, 5–7
Win	1–1	Nov 2021	Challenger de Guayaquil, Ecuador	Challenger	Clay	(Netherlands) Jesper de Jong	6–1, 7–5
Loss	1–2	Nov 2021	Puerto Vallarta Open, Mexico	Challenger	Hard	(Germany) Daniel Altmaier	3–6, 6–3, 3–6
Loss	1–3	Mar 2022	Challenger de Santiago, Chile	Challenger	Clay	(Bolivia) Hugo Dellien	3–6, 6–4, 4–6
Loss	1–4	Apr 2023	Florianópolis Challenger, Brazil	Challenger	Clay	(Chile) Tomás Barrios Vera	4–6, 4–6
Win	2–4	May 2023	Internazionali d'Abruzzo, Italy	Challenger	Clay	(France) Benoît Paire	6–1, 7–5
Win	3–4	Jul 2023	Tennis Open Karlsruhe, Germany	Challenger	Clay	(Italy) Giulio Zeppieri	2–6, 1–0 ret.
Win	4–4	Nov 2023	Challenger de Guayaquil, Ecuador (2)	Challenger	Clay	(Colombia) Daniel Elahi Galán	6–2, 6–2
Win	5–4	Nov 2023	Aberto da República, Brazil	Challenger	Hard	(Argentina) Román Andrés Burruchaga	6–3, 7–6^{(8–6)}
Win	6–4	Apr 2024	Open Aix Provence, France	Challenger	Clay	(Spain) Jaume Munar	6–3, 6–2
Loss	6–5	Sep 2025	Guangzhou Tennis Open, China	Challenger	Hard	(Argentina) Juan Manuel Cerúndolo	2–6, 3–6
Loss	6–6	Jan 2026	Challenger Concepción, Chile	Challenger	Clay	(Paraguay) Daniel Vallejo	2–6, 6–1, 1–6
Win	7–6	Apr 2026	Open Aix Provence, France (2)	Challenger	Clay	(Belgium) Zizou Bergs	6–4, 4–6, 6–3

=== Doubles: (1 runner-up) ===
Result	W–L	Date	Tournament	Tier	Surface	Partner	Opponents	Score
Loss	0–1	Oct 2021	Lima Challenger II, Peru	Challenger	Clay	(Chile) Tomás Barrios Vera	(Peru) Sergio Galdós (Portugal) Gonçalo Oliveira	2–6, 6–2, [5–10]

== ITF Tour finals ==
=== Singles: 7 (3 titles, 4 runners-up) ===
Finals by surface
Hard (2–2)
Clay (1–2)

Result	W–L	Date	Tournament	Tier	Surface	Opponent	Score
Win	1–0	Dec 2016	Chile F6, Santiago	Futures	Clay	(Argentina) Genaro Olivieri	6–4, 4–6, 6–3
Loss	1–1	Dec 2017	Chile F3, Antofagasta	Futures	Clay	(Chile) Tomás Barrios Vera	7–5, 6–7^{(5–7)}, 2–6
Win	2–1	Dec 2018	Dominican Republic F2, Santo Domingo	Futures	Hard	(Dominican Republic) José Olivares	6–3, 6–3
Loss	2–2	Dec 2018	Dominican Republic F3, Santo Domingo	Futures	Hard	(Dominican Republic) Nick Hardt	3–6, 5–7
Loss	2–3	Jan 2019	M25 Weston, US	WTT	Clay	(Kazakhstan) Dmitry Popko	2–6, 3–6
Loss	2–4	Feb 2019	M25 Aktobe, Kazakhstan	WTT	Hard (i)	(Netherlands) Niels Lootsma	4–6, 4–6
Win	3–4	Feb 2019	M25 Aktobe, Kazakhstan	WTT	Hard (i)	(Netherlands) Niels Lootsma	6–3, 6–4

=== Doubles: 9 (5 titles, 4 runners-up) ===
Finals by surface
Hard (0–1)
Clay (5–3)

Result	W–L	Date	Tournament	Tier	Surface	Partner	Opponents	Score
Loss	0–1	Jul 2014	ITF Canada, Vancouver	Futures	Hard	(Canada) Riaan du Toit	(Canada) Daniel Chu (United States) Kyle McMorrow	2–6, 7–5, [7–10]
Loss	0–2	Nov 2016	ITF Bolivia, Santa Cruz de la Sierra	Futures	Clay	(Argentina) Franco Emanuel Egea	(Bolivia) Hugo Dellien (Bolivia) Federico Zeballos	4–6, 4–6
Win	1–2	Dec 2016	ITF Chile, Santiago	Futures	Clay	(Chile) Jorge Montero	(Chile) Víctor Núñez (Chile) Jorge Aguilar	6–3, 6–4
Loss	1–3	Jun 2017	ITF Tunisia, Hammamet	Futures	Clay	(Brazil) Pedro Sakamoto	(Italy) Riccardo Sinicropi (Italy) Riccardo Bonadio	6–7^{(4–7)}, 0–6
Win	2–3	Oct 2017	ITF Turkey, Antalya	Futures	Clay	(Croatia) Domagoj Biljesko	(Italy) Federico Maccari (Italy) Riccardo Bonadio	7–6^{(7–5)}, 4–6, [10–3]
Win	3–3	Oct 2017	ITF Turkey, Antalya	Futures	Clay	(Croatia) Domagoj Biljesko	(Russia) Alexander Boborykin (Russia) Timur Kiyamov	6–3, 6–4
Win	4–3	Nov 2017	ITF Chile, Curicó	Futures	Clay	(Argentina) Matías Franco Descotte	(Argentina) Mariano Kestelboim (Argentina) Matías Zukas	6–2, 6–3
Loss	4–4	Jan 2019	M25 Naples, US	WTT	Clay	(Chile) Gonzalo Lama	(Republic of Ireland) Julian Bradley (United States) Strong Kirchheimer	4–6, 2–6
Win	5–4	Jun 2019	M25 Bacău, Romania	WTT	Clay	(Peru) Juan Pablo Varillas	(Argentina) Manuel Peña López (Peru) Alexander Merino	7–6^{(7–5)}, 7–6^{(7–4)}

== Wins against top-10 players ==
- Tabilo has a 4–11 record against players who were ranked in the top 10 at the time the match was played.

Season	2024	2025	2026	Total
Wins	1	2	1	4

#	Player	Rk	Event	Surface	Rd	Score	Rk	Ref
2024
1.	(Serbia) Novak Djokovic	1	Italian Open, Italy	Clay	3R	6–2, 6–3	32	
2025
2.	(Serbia) Novak Djokovic	5	Monte-Carlo Masters, France	Clay	2R	6–3, 6–4	32	
3.	(Italy) Lorenzo Musetti	9	Chengdu Open, China	Hard	F	6–3, 2–6, 7–6^{(7–5)}	112	
2026
4.	(United States) Ben Shelton	8	Washington Open, United States	Hard	QF	4–6, 7–5, 6–4	30	

- Key: (Rk) first use, opponent rank; (Rd) round; (Rk) 2nd use, player rank; (Ref) reference; (F) final; (SF) semifinal; (QF) quarterfinal; (#R) rounds 4, 3, 2, 1; (RR) round-robin stage; (Q#) qualifying rounds or stages (3), 2, 1.

* As of 1 August 2026.

== National representation ==
=== Davis Cup ===
- Tabilo represents Chile at the Davis Cup, where he has a W/L record of 10–12. In 2019, he made his Davis Cup debut in a doubles rubber against Germany, partnering Tomás Barrios Vera against Kevin Krawietz and Andreas Mies.

==== Participations: 22 (10–12) ====
Group membership World Group (1–7) Qualifying Round (5–3) WG Play-off (0–0) Group I (4–2) Group II (0–0) Group III (0–0) Group IV (0–0)	Matches by surface Hard (4–11) Clay (6–1) Grass (0–0) Carpet (0–0)	Matches by type Singles (6–6) Doubles (4–6)

- ▲ ▼ indicates the outcome of the Davis Cup match followed by the score, date, place of event, the zonal classification and its phase, and the court surface.

Rubber outcome	No.	Rubber	Match type (partner if any)	Opponent nation	Opponent player(s)	Score
▼1–2; 21 November 2019; Estadio Manolo Santana, Madrid, Spain; Davis Cup Final Group C Round robin; Hard (indoor) surface
Defeat	1	III	Doubles (with Tomás Barrios Vera)	Germany	Kevin Krawietz / Andreas Mies	6–7^{(3–7)}, 3–6
▼1–3; 6-7 March 2020; Royal Tennis Hall, Stockholm, Sweden; Davis Cup qualifying round; Hard (indoor) surface
Victory	1	II	Singles	Sweden	Elias Ymer	6–4, 6–3
Defeat	2	III	Doubles (with Tomás Barrios Vera)	Sweden	Markus Eriksson / Robert Lindstedt	4–6, 4–6
Defeat	3	IV	Singles	Sweden	Mikael Ymer	6–3, 5–7, 3–6
▼1–3; 17-18 September 2021; NTC Arena, Bratislava, Slovakia; Davis Cup World Group I; Hard (indoor) surface
Defeat	4	III	Doubles (with Tomás Barrios Vera)	Slovakia	Filip Polášek / Igor Zelenay	1–6, 6–7^{(4–7)}
▲4–0; 4-5 March 2022; Club de Tenis Unión, Viña del Mar, Chile; Davis Cup World Group I play-offs; clay (outdoor) surface
Victory	2	I	Singles	Slovenia	Bor Artnak	6–3, 6–3
Victory	3	III	Doubles (with Tomás Barrios Vera)	Slovenia	Sebastian Dominko / Blaž Rola	6–2, 6–3
▲3–2; 17-18 September 2022; Club Lawn Tennis de La Exposición, Lima, Peru; Davis Cup World Group I; clay (outdoor) surface
Victory	4	I	Singles	Peru	Nicolás Álvarez	6–2, 6–4
Victory	5	III	Doubles (with Nicolás Jarry)	Peru	Sergio Galdós / Arklon Huertas del Pino	6–4, 6–2
Defeat	5	IV	Singles	Peru	Juan Pablo Varillas	6–1, 4–6, 4–6
▲3–1; 4-5 February 2023; Campus Trentino, La Serena, Chile; Davis Cup qualifying round; Clay (outdoor) surface
Victory	6	III	Doubles (with Tomás Barrios Vera)	Kazakhstan	Andrey Golubev / Aleksandr Nedovyesov	6–4, 7–5
▲3–0; 11 September 2023; Unipol Arena, Bologna, Italy; Davis Cup Final Group A Round robin; Hard (indoor) surface
Victory	7	III	Doubles (with Tomás Barrios Vera)	Sweden	Filip Bergevi / André Göransson	6–4, 7–5
▼0–3; 14 September 2023; Unipol Arena, Bologna, Italy; Davis Cup Final Group A Round robin; Hard (indoor) surface
Defeat	6	III	Doubles (with Tomás Barrios Vera)	Italy	Lorenzo Musetti / Lorenzo Sonego	7–6^{(7–3)}, 3–6, 6–7^{(2–7)}
▼1–2; 15 September 2023; Unipol Arena, Bologna, Italy; Davis Cup Final Group A Round robin; Hard (indoor) surface
Defeat	7	I	Singles	Canada	Alexis Galarneau	3–6, 6–7^{(5–7)}
Defeat	8	III	Doubles (with Tomás Barrios Vera)	Canada	Alexis Galarneau / Vasek Pospisil	3–6, 6–7^{(7–9)}
▲3–2; 3-4 February 2024; Estadoo Nacional, Santiago, Chile; Davis Cup qualifying round; Hard (outdoor) surface
Victory	8	I	Singles	Peru	Juan Pablo Varillas	4–6, 6–2, 6–1
Defeat	9	III	Doubles (with Tomás Barrios Vera)	Peru	Arklon Huertas del Pino / Conner Huertas del Pino	5–7, 3–6
Victory	9	V	Singles	Peru	Ignacio Buse	2–6, 6–3, 6–2
▼0–3; 11 September 2024; Hengqin Tennis Center, Zhuhai, China; Davis Cup Final Group C Round robin; Hard (indoor) surface
Defeat	10	II	Singles	United States	Brandon Nakashima	6–7^{(5–7)}, 6–2, 6–7^{(3–7)}
▼0–3; 12 September 2024; Hengqin Tennis Center, Zhuhai, China; Davis Cup Final Group C Round robin; Hard (indoor) surface
Defeat	11	II	Singles	Germany	Yannick Hanfmann	5–7, 4–6
▲2–1; 15 September 2024; Hengqin Tennis Center, Zhuhai, China; Davis Cup Final Group C Round robin; Hard (indoor) surface
Defeat	12	II	Singles	Slovakia	Jozef Kovalik	4–6, 7–6^{(7–5)}, 1–6
▲4–0; 6-7 February 2026; Estadio Nacional, Santiago, Chile; Davis Cup Qualifiers first round; Clay (outdoor) surface
Victory	10	I	Singles	Serbia	Ognjen Milić	6–7^{(3–7)}, 6–2, 6–4
