= 2024 WTA 1000 tournaments =

Women's professional tennis tour

2024 WTA 1000
Details
- Duration: February 12 – October 13
- Edition: 35th
- Tournaments: 10

Achievements (singles)
- Most titles: (Poland) Iga Świątek (4)
- Most finals: Aryna Sabalenka (Poland) Iga Świątek (4)

The WTA 1000 tournaments, make up the elite tour for professional women's tennis organized by the WTA called the WTA Tour. This is the first year when all ten WTA 1000 tournaments are mandatory.

== Tournaments ==
Tournament	Country	Location	Surface	Date	Prize money
Qatar Total Open	Qatar	Doha	Hard	Feb 12 – 18	$3,211,715
Dubai Tennis Championships	United Arab Emirates	Dubai	Hard	Feb 19 – 25	$3,211,715
Indian Wells Open	United States	Indian Wells	Hard	Mar 4 – 17	$8,995,555
Miami Open	United States	Miami	Hard	Mar 19 – 31	$8,995,555
Madrid Open	Spain	Madrid	Clay (red)	Apr 22 – May 5	$8,770,480
Italian Open	Italy	Rome	Clay (red)	May 6 – 19	$5,509,771
Canadian Open	Canada	Toronto	Hard	Aug 5 – 11	$3,211,715
Cincinnati Open	United States	Cincinnati	Hard	Aug 12 – 18	$3,211,715
China Open	China	Beijing	Hard	Sep 23 – Oct 6	$8,955,610
Wuhan Open	China	Wuhan	Hard	Oct 7 – 13	$3,221,715

== Results ==
* First-time champion

Tournament	Singles champions	Runners-up	Score	Doubles champions	Runners-up	Score
Doha Singles – Doubles	(Poland) Iga Świątek	(Kazakhstan) Elena Rybakina	7–6^{(10–8)}, 6–2	(Netherlands) Demi Schuurs (Brazil) Luisa Stefani	(United States) Desirae Krawczyk (United States) Caroline Dolehide	6–4, 6–2
Dubai Singles – Doubles	(Italy) Jasmine Paolini*	Anna Kalinskaya	4–6, 7–5, 7–5	(Australia) Storm Hunter (Czech Republic) Kateřina Siniaková	(United States) Nicole Melichar-Martinez (Australia) Ellen Perez	6–4, 6–2
Indian Wells Singles – Doubles	(Poland) Iga Świątek (2)	(Greece) Maria Sakkari	6–4, 6–0	(Chinese Taipei) Hsieh Su-wei (Belgium) Elise Mertens	(Australia) Storm Hunter (Czech Republic) Kateřina Siniaková	6–3, 6–4
Miami Singles – Doubles	(United States) Danielle Collins*	(Kazakhstan) Elena Rybakina	7–5, 6–3	(United States) Sofia Kenin (United States) Bethanie Mattek-Sands	(Canada) Gabriela Dabrowski (New Zealand) Erin Routliffe	4–6, 7–6^{(7–5)}, [11–9]
Madrid Singles – Doubles	(Poland) Iga Świątek (3)	Aryna Sabalenka	7–5, 4–6, 7–6^{(9–7)}	(Spain) Cristina Bucșa*	(Czech Republic) Barbora Krejčíková (Germany) Laura Siegemund	6–0, 6–2
Madrid Singles – Doubles	(Poland) Iga Świątek (3)	Aryna Sabalenka	7–5, 4–6, 7–6^{(9–7)}	(Spain) Sara Sorribes Tormo	(Czech Republic) Barbora Krejčíková (Germany) Laura Siegemund	6–0, 6–2
Rome Singles – Doubles	(Poland) Iga Świątek (4)	Aryna Sabalenka	6–2, 6–3	(Italy) Sara Errani	(United States) Coco Gauff (New Zealand) Erin Routliffe	6–3, 4–6, [10–8]
Rome Singles – Doubles	(Poland) Iga Świątek (4)	Aryna Sabalenka	6–2, 6–3	(Italy) Jasmine Paolini*	(United States) Coco Gauff (New Zealand) Erin Routliffe	6–3, 4–6, [10–8]
Toronto Singles – Doubles	(United States) Jessica Pegula	(United States) Amanda Anisimova	6–3, 2–6, 6–1	(United States) Desirae Krawczyk* (United States) Caroline Dolehide*	(Canada) Gabriela Dabrowski (New Zealand) Erin Routliffe	7–6^{(7–2)}, 3–6, [10–7]
Cincinnati Singles – Doubles	Aryna Sabalenka	(United States) Jessica Pegula	6–3, 7–5	(United States) Asia Muhammad* (New Zealand) Erin Routliffe*	(Canada) Leylah Fernandez (Kazakhstan) Yulia Putintseva	3–6, 6–1, [10–4]
Beijing Singles – Doubles	(United States) Coco Gauff	(Czech Republic) Karolína Muchová	6–1, 6–3	(Italy) Sara Errani (2) (Italy) Jasmine Paolini (2)	(Chinese Taipei) Chan Hao-ching; Veronika Kudermetova	6-4, 6–4
Wuhan Singles – Doubles	Aryna Sabalenka (2)	(China) Zheng Qinwen	6–3, 5–7, 6–3	(Kazakhstan) Anna Danilina*; Irina Khromacheva*	(United States) Asia Muhammad (United States) Jessica Pegula	6–3, 7–6^{(8–6)}

== Tournament details ==
Key

- Q = Qualifier
- WC = Wild card
- LL = Lucky loser
- Alt = Alternate
- ITF = ITF entry
- PR = Protected ranking
- SR = Special ranking
- SE = Special exempt
- JE = Junior exempt
- JR = Junior Accelerator Programme entrant
- CO = College Accelerator Programme entrant
- NG = Next Gen Accelerator Program entrant
- w/o = Walkover
- r = Retired
- d = Defaulted

=== Doha ===
==== Singles ====
Quarterfinals
1	(Poland) Iga Świątek	6	6
Victoria Azarenka	4	0
PR	(Japan) Naomi Osaka	6^{6}	6^{5}
(Czech Republic) Karolína Plíšková	7^{8}	7^{7}
(Canada) Leylah Fernandez	4	2
3	(Kazakhstan) Elena Rybakina	6	6
Anastasia Pavlyuchenkova	7	6
Q	(United States) Danielle Collins	5	4

Semifinals
1	(Poland) Iga Świątek	w/o
(Czech Republic) Karolína Plíšková
3	(Kazakhstan) Elena Rybakina	6	6
Anastasia Pavlyuchenkova	2	4

Final
1	(Poland) Iga Świątek	7^{10}	6
3	(Kazakhstan) Elena Rybakina	6^{8}	2

==== Doubles ====
Semifinals
5	(Netherlands) Demi Schuurs (Brazil) Luisa Stefani	6	6
(Czech Republic) Marie Bouzková (Czech Republic) Markéta Vondroušová	1	4
(United States) Caroline Dolehide (United States) Desirae Krawczyk	7^{7}	6
(Ukraine) Anhelina Kalinina (China) Xu Yifan	6^{5}	4

Final
5	(Netherlands) Demi Schuurs (Brazil) Luisa Stefani	6	6
(United States) Caroline Dolehide (United States) Desirae Krawczyk	4	2

=== Dubai ===
==== Singles ====
Quarterfinals
1	(Poland) Iga Świątek	6	6
6	(China) Zheng Qinwen	3	2
3	(United States) Coco Gauff	6	4	2
Q	Anna Kalinskaya	2	6	6
(Italy) Jasmine Paolini	w/o
4	(Kazakhstan) Elena Rybakina
7	(Czech Republic) Markéta Vondroušová	6	6^{1}	2
(Romania) Sorana Cîrstea	2	7^{7}	6

Semifinals
1	(Poland) Iga Świątek	4	4
Q	Anna Kalinskaya	6	6
(Italy) Jasmine Paolini	6	7^{8}
(Romania) Sorana Cîrstea	2	6^{6}

Final
Q	Anna Kalinskaya	6	5	5
(Italy) Jasmine Paolini	4	7	7

==== Doubles ====
Semifinals
Aliaksandra Sasnovich (Germany) Laura Siegemund	3	2
3	(United States) Nicole Melichar-Martinez (Australia) Ellen Perez	6	6
4	(Australia) Storm Hunter (Czech Republic) Kateřina Siniaková	6	6
2	(Canada) Gabriela Dabrowski (New Zealand) Erin Routliffe	4	4

Final
3	(United States) Nicole Melichar-Martinez (Australia) Ellen Perez	4	2
4	(Australia) Storm Hunter (Czech Republic) Kateřina Siniaková	6	6

=== Indian Wells ===
==== Singles ====
Quarterfinals
1	(Poland) Iga Świątek	6	1
WC	(Denmark) Caroline Wozniacki	4	0^{r}
28	Anastasia Potapova	0	5
31	(Ukraine) Marta Kostyuk	6	7
(China) Yuan Yue	4	3
3	(United States) Coco Gauff	6	6
9	(Greece) Maria Sakkari	5	6	6
23	(United States) Emma Navarro	7	2	4

Semifinals
1	(Poland) Iga Świątek	6	6
31	(Ukraine) Marta Kostyuk	2	1
3	(United States) Coco Gauff	4	7^{7}	2
9	(Greece) Maria Sakkari	6	6^{5}	6

Final
1	(Poland) Iga Świątek	6	6
9	(Greece) Maria Sakkari	4	0

==== Doubles ====
Semifinals
1	(Chinese Taipei) Hsieh Su-wei (Belgium) Elise Mertens	6	7^{7}
4	(United States) Nicole Melichar-Martinez (Australia) Ellen Perez	2	6^{5}
3	(Australia) Storm Hunter (Czech Republic) Kateřina Siniaková	6	6
(United States) Asia Muhammad (Japan) Ena Shibahara	4	4

Final
1	(Chinese Taipei) Hsieh Su-wei (Belgium) Elise Mertens	6	6
3	(Australia) Storm Hunter (Czech Republic) Kateřina Siniaková	3	4

=== Miami ===
==== Singles ====
Quarterfinals
14	Ekaterina Alexandrova	3	6	6
5	(United States) Jessica Pegula	6	4	4
23	(France) Caroline Garcia	3	2
(United States) Danielle Collins	6	6
8	(Greece) Maria Sakkari	5	7^{7}	4
4	(Kazakhstan) Elena Rybakina	7	6^{4}	6
27	Victoria Azarenka	7^{7}	1	6
(Kazakhstan) Yulia Putintseva	6^{4}	6	3

Semifinals
14	Ekaterina Alexandrova	3	2
(United States) Danielle Collins	6	6
4	(Kazakhstan) Elena Rybakina	6	0	7^{7}
27	Victoria Azarenka	4	6	6^{2}

Final
(United States) Danielle Collins	7	6
4	(Kazakhstan) Elena Rybakina	5	3

==== Doubles ====
Semifinals
Alt	(United States) Sofia Kenin (United States) Bethanie Mattek-Sands	6^{2}	6	[10]
(Italy) Sara Errani (Italy) Jasmine Paolini	7^{7}	4	[1]
(United States) Asia Muhammad (United States) Alycia Parks	7^{7}	4	[4]
2	(Canada) Gabriela Dabrowski (New Zealand) Erin Routliffe	6^{4}	6	[10]

Final
Alt	(United States) Sofia Kenin (United States) Bethanie Mattek-Sands	4	7^{7}	[11]
2	(Canada) Gabriela Dabrowski (New Zealand) Erin Routliffe	6	6^{5}	[9]

=== Madrid ===
==== Singles ====
Quarterfinals
1	(Poland) Iga Świątek	4	6	6
11	(Brazil) Beatriz Haddad Maia	6	0	2
18	(United States) Madison Keys	0	7	6
8	(Tunisia) Ons Jabeur	6	5	1
(Kazakhstan) Yulia Putintseva	6	6^{4}	5
4	(Kazakhstan) Elena Rybakina	4	7^{7}	7
Mirra Andreeva	1	4
2	Aryna Sabalenka	6	6

Semifinals
1	(Poland) Iga Świątek	6	6
18	(United States) Madison Keys	1	3
4	(Kazakhstan) Elena Rybakina	6	5	6^{5}
2	Aryna Sabalenka	1	7	7^{7}

Final
1	(Poland) Iga Świątek	7	4	7^{9}
2	Aryna Sabalenka	5	6	6^{7}

==== Doubles ====
Semifinals
1	(Chinese Taipei) Hsieh Su-wei (Belgium) Elise Mertens	3	5
6	(Czech Republic) Barbora Krejčíková (Germany) Laura Siegemund	6	7
8	(Spain) Cristina Bucșa (Spain) Sara Sorribes Tormo	6	7^{7}
Anastasia Pavlyuchenkova; Anastasia Potapova	4	6^{1}

Final
6	(Czech Republic) Barbora Krejčíková (Germany) Laura Siegemund	0	2
8	(Spain) Cristina Bucșa (Spain) Sara Sorribes Tormo	6	6

=== Rome ===
==== Singles ====
Quarterfinals
1	(Poland) Iga Świątek	6	6
18	(United States) Madison Keys	1	3
3	(United States) Coco Gauff	7^{7}	6
7	(China) Zheng Qinwen	6^{4}	1
24	Victoria Azarenka	4	3
13	(United States) Danielle Collins	6	6
9	(Latvia) Jeļena Ostapenko	2	4
2	Aryna Sabalenka	6	6

Semifinals
1	(Poland) Iga Świątek	6	6
3	(United States) Coco Gauff	4	3
13	(United States) Danielle Collins	5	2
2	Aryna Sabalenka	7	6

Final
1	(Poland) Iga Świątek	6	6
2	Aryna Sabalenka	2	3

==== Doubles ====
Semifinals
PR	(China) Wang Xinyu (China) Zheng Saisai	3	6^{3}
3	(United States) Coco Gauff (New Zealand) Erin Routliffe	6	7^{7}
8	(United States) Caroline Dolehide (United States) Desirae Krawczyk	1	2
(Italy) Sara Errani (Italy) Jasmine Paolini	6	6

Final
3	(United States) Coco Gauff (New Zealand) Erin Routliffe	3	6	[8]
(Italy) Sara Errani (Italy) Jasmine Paolini	6	4	[10]

=== Canada ===
==== Singles ====
Quarterfinals
14	Diana Shnaider	4	6	6
6	Liudmila Samsonova	6	1	4
3	(United States) Jessica Pegula	6	7
(United States) Peyton Stearns	4	5
8	(United States) Emma Navarro	6	7^{7}
LL	(United States) Taylor Townsend	3	6^{5}
PR	(United States) Amanda Anisimova	6	6
2	Aryna Sabalenka	4	2

Semifinals
14	Diana Shnaider	4	3
3	(United States) Jessica Pegula	6	6
8	(United States) Emma Navarro	3	6	2
PR	(United States) Amanda Anisimova	6	2	6

Final
3	(United States) Jessica Pegula	6	2	6
PR	(United States) Amanda Anisimova	3	6	1

==== Doubles ====
Semifinals
1	(Canada) Gabriela Dabrowski (New Zealand) Erin Routliffe	6	6
WC	(Canada) Bianca Fernandez (Canada) Leylah Fernandez	2	4
3	(United States) Caroline Dolehide (United States) Desirae Krawczyk	6	3	[10]
7	(United States) Sofia Kenin (United States) Bethanie Mattek-Sands	2	6	[7]

Final
1	(Canada) Gabriela Dabrowski (New Zealand) Erin Routliffe	6^{2}	6	[7]
3	(United States) Caroline Dolehide (United States) Desirae Krawczyk	7^{7}	3	[10]

=== Cincinnati ===
==== Singles ====
Quarterfinals
1	(Poland) Iga Świątek	4	6	7
Mirra Andreeva	6	3	5
3	Aryna Sabalenka	6	6
10	Liudmila Samsonova	3	2
6	(United States) Jessica Pegula	7	6^{1}	7^{7}
(Canada) Leylah Fernandez	5	7^{7}	6^{3}
Anastasia Pavlyuchenkova	3	2
PR	(Spain) Paula Badosa	6	6

Semifinals
1	(Poland) Iga Świątek	3	3
3	Aryna Sabalenka	6	6
6	(United States) Jessica Pegula	6	3	6
PR	(Spain) Paula Badosa	2	6	3

Final
3	Aryna Sabalenka	6	7
6	(United States) Jessica Pegula	3	5

==== Doubles ====
Semifinals
(Canada) Leylah Fernandez (Kazakhstan) Yulia Putintseva	6	6
(Czech Republic) Linda Nosková; Diana Shnaider	3	4
3	(United States) Asia Muhammad (New Zealand) Erin Routliffe	7^{7}	6
(United Kingdom) Harriet Dart (Australia) Ellen Perez	6^{5}	3

Final
(Canada) Leylah Fernandez (Kazakhstan) Yulia Putintseva	6	1	[4]
3	(United States) Asia Muhammad (New Zealand) Erin Routliffe	3	6	[10]

=== Beijing ===
==== Singles ====
Quarterfinals
1	Aryna Sabalenka	6^{5}	6	4
(Czech Republic) Karolína Muchová	7^{7}	2	6
17	Mirra Andreeva	7	0	4
5	(China) Zheng Qinwen	5	6	6
Q	(Ukraine) Yuliia Starodubtseva	6	2	2
4	(United States) Coco Gauff	2	6	6
WC	(China) Zhang Shuai	1	6^{4}
15	(Spain) Paula Badosa	6	7^{7}

Semifinals
(Czech Republic) Karolína Muchová	6	6
5	(China) Zheng Qinwen	3	4
4	(United States) Coco Gauff	4	6	6
15	(Spain) Paula Badosa	6	4	2

Final
(Czech Republic) Karolína Muchová	1	3
4	(United States) Coco Gauff	6	6

==== Doubles ====
Semifinals
7	(Chinese Taipei) Chan Hao-ching; Veronika Kudermetova	6	6
(Italy) Elisabetta Cocciaretto; Liudmila Samsonova	3	4
5	(Italy) Sara Errani (Italy) Jasmine Paolini	6	1	[10]
(United States) Sofia Kenin (United States) Bethanie Mattek-Sands	3	6	[4]

Final
7	(Chinese Taipei) Chan Hao-ching; Veronika Kudermetova	4	4
5	(Italy) Sara Errani (Italy) Jasmine Paolini	6	6

=== Wuhan ===
==== Singles ====
Quarterfinals
1	Aryna Sabalenka	6	6
(Poland) Magdalena Fręch	2	2
4	(United States) Coco Gauff	6	6
(Poland) Magda Linette	0	4
5	(China) Zheng Qinwen	6	3	6
3	(Italy) Jasmine Paolini	2	6	3
Ekaterina Alexandrova	6	5	6^{6}
(China) Wang Xinyu	4	7	7^{8}

Semifinals
1	Aryna Sabalenka	1	6	6
4	(United States) Coco Gauff	6	4	4
5	(China) Zheng Qinwen	6	6
(China) Wang Xinyu	3	4

Final
1	Aryna Sabalenka	6	5	6
5	(China) Zheng Qinwen	3	7	3

==== Doubles ====
Semifinals
(Kazakhstan) Anna Danilina; Irina Khromacheva	6	6
Ekaterina Alexandrova (Czech Republic) Kateřina Siniaková	1	4
(United States) Asia Muhammad (United States) Jessica Pegula	7	6
(Canada) Leylah Fernandez (Indonesia) Aldila Sutjiadi	5	2

Final
(Kazakhstan) Anna Danilina; Irina Khromacheva	6	7^{8}
(United States) Asia Muhammad (United States) Jessica Pegula	3	6^{6}

== See also ==
- WTA 1000 tournaments
- 2024 WTA Tour
- 2024 ATP Tour Masters 1000
- 2024 ATP Tour
