= 2024 ATP Masters 1000 tournaments =

Men's professional tennis tour

2024 ATP Tour Masters 1000
Details
- Duration: March 6 – November 3
- Edition: 35th
- Tournaments: 9

Achievements (singles)
- Most titles: (Italy) Jannik Sinner (3)
- Most finals: (Italy) Jannik Sinner (3)

The 2024 ATP Tour Masters 1000 is the thirty-fifth edition of the ATP 1000 Series. The event series is named as such as the champions of each ATP 1000 event are awarded 1,000 rankings points.

== Tournaments ==
Tournament	Country	Location	Surface	Date	Prize money
Indian Wells Open	United States	Indian Wells	Hard	Mar 6 – 17	$8,995,555
Miami Open	United States	Miami Gardens	Hard	Mar 20 – 31	$8,995,555
Monte-Carlo Masters	France	Roquebrune-Cap-Martin	Clay (red)	Apr 7 – 14	€5,950,575
Madrid Open	Spain	Madrid	Clay (red)	Apr 24 – May 5	€7,877,020
Italian Open	Italy	Rome	Clay (red)	May 8 – 19	€7,877,020
Canadian Open	Canada	Montreal	Hard	Aug 6 – 12	$6,795,555
Cincinnati Open	United States	Mason	Hard	Aug 12 – 19	$6,795,555
Shanghai Masters	China	Shanghai	Hard	Oct 2 – 13	$8,995,555
Paris Masters	France	Paris	Hard (indoor)	Oct 28 – Nov 3	€5,950,575

== Results ==
* First-time champion

ATP 1000	Singles champions	Runners-up	Score	Doubles champions	Runners-up	Score
Indian Wells Open Singles – Doubles	(Spain) Carlos Alcaraz	Daniil Medvedev	7–6^{(7–5)}, 6–1	(Netherlands) Wesley Koolhof (Croatia) Nikola Mektić	(Spain) Marcel Granollers (Argentina) Horacio Zeballos	7–6^{(7–2)}, 7–6^{(7–4)}
Miami Open Singles – Doubles	(Italy) Jannik Sinner	(Bulgaria) Grigor Dimitrov	6–3, 6–1	(India) Rohan Bopanna (Australia) Matthew Ebden	(Croatia) Ivan Dodig (United States) Austin Krajicek	6–7^{(3–7)}, 6–3, [10–6]
Monte-Carlo Masters Singles – Doubles	(Greece) Stefanos Tsitsipas	(Norway) Casper Ruud	6–1, 6–4	(Belgium) Sander Gillé* (Belgium) Joran Vliegen*	(Brazil) Marcelo Melo (Germany) Alexander Zverev	5–7, 6–3, [10–5]
Madrid Open Singles – Doubles	Andrey Rublev	(Canada) Félix Auger-Aliassime	4–6, 7–5, 7–5	(United States) Sebastian Korda* (Australia) Jordan Thompson*	(Uruguay) Ariel Behar (Czech Republic) Adam Pavlásek	6–3, 7–6^{(9–7)}
Italian Open Singles – Doubles	(Germany) Alexander Zverev	(Chile) Nicolás Jarry	6–4, 7–5	(Spain) Marcel Granollers (Argentina) Horacio Zeballos	(El Salvador) Marcelo Arévalo (Croatia) Mate Pavić	6–2, 6–2
Canadian Open Singles – Doubles	(Australia) Alexei Popyrin*	Andrey Rublev	6–2, 6–4	(Spain) Marcel Granollers (Argentina) Horacio Zeballos	(United States) Rajeev Ram (United Kingdom) Joe Salisbury	6–2, 7–6^{(7–4)}
Cincinnati Open Singles – Doubles	(Italy) Jannik Sinner	(United States) Frances Tiafoe	7–6^{(7–4)}, 6–2	(El Salvador) Marcelo Arévalo (Croatia) Mate Pavić	(United States) Mackenzie McDonald (United States) Alex Michelsen	6–2, 6–4
Shanghai Masters Singles – Doubles	(Italy) Jannik Sinner	(Serbia) Novak Djokovic	7–6^{(7–4)}, 6–3	(Netherlands) Wesley Koolhof (Croatia) Nikola Mektić	(Argentina) Máximo González (Argentina) Andrés Molteni	6–4, 6–4
Paris Masters Singles – Doubles	(Germany) Alexander Zverev	(France) Ugo Humbert	6–2, 6–2	(Netherlands) Wesley Koolhof (Croatia) Nikola Mektić	(United Kingdom) Lloyd Glasspool (Czech Republic) Adam Pavlásek	3–6, 6–3, [10–5]

== Tournament details ==
Key

- Q = Qualifier
- WC = Wild card
- LL = Lucky loser
- Alt = Alternate
- ITF = ITF entry
- PR = Protected ranking
- SR = Special ranking
- SE = Special exempt
- JE = Junior exempt
- JR = Junior Accelerator Programme entrant
- CO = College Accelerator Programme entrant
- NG = Next Gen Accelerator Program entrant
- w/o = Walkover
- r = Retired
- d = Defaulted

=== Indian Wells Open ===
==== Singles ====
Quarterfinals
17	(United States) Tommy Paul	6	1	6
9	(Norway) Casper Ruud	2	6	3
4	Daniil Medvedev	7	6
7	(Denmark) Holger Rune	5	4
32	(Czech Republic) Jiří Lehečka	3	3
3	(Italy) Jannik Sinner	6	6
6	(Germany) Alexander Zverev	3	1
2	(Spain) Carlos Alcaraz	6	6

Semifinals
17	(United States) Tommy Paul	6	6^{3}	2
4	Daniil Medvedev	1	7^{7}	6
3	(Italy) Jannik Sinner	6	3	2
2	(Spain) Carlos Alcaraz	1	6	6

Final
4	Daniil Medvedev	6^{5}	1
2	(Spain) Carlos Alcaraz	7^{7}	6

==== Doubles ====
Semifinals
5	(Spain) Marcel Granollers (Argentina) Horacio Zeballos	4	7^{9}	[10]
(Italy) Simone Bolelli (Italy) Andrea Vavassori	6	6^{7}	[8]
7	(Germany) Kevin Krawietz (Germany) Tim Pütz	4	1
(Netherlands) Wesley Koolhof (Croatia) Nikola Mektić	6	6

Final
5	(Spain) Marcel Granollers (Argentina) Horacio Zeballos	6^{2}	6^{4}
(Netherlands) Wesley Koolhof (Croatia) Nikola Mektić	7^{7}	7^{7}

=== Miami Open ===
==== Singles ====
Quarterfinals
1	(Spain) Carlos Alcaraz	2	4
11	(Bulgaria) Grigor Dimitrov	6	6
4	(Germany) Alexander Zverev	6	7
(Hungary) Fábián Marozsán	3	5
22	(Chile) Nicolás Jarry	2	6^{7}
3	Daniil Medvedev	6	7^{9}
(Czech Republic) Tomáš Macháč	4	2
2	(Italy) Jannik Sinner	6	6

Semifinals
11	(Bulgaria) Grigor Dimitrov	6	6^{4}	6
4	(Germany) Alexander Zverev	4	7^{7}	4
3	Daniil Medvedev	1	2
2	(Italy) Jannik Sinner	6	6

Final
11	(Bulgaria) Grigor Dimitrov	3	1
2	(Italy) Jannik Sinner	6	6

==== Doubles ====
Semifinals
1	(India) Rohan Bopanna (Australia) Matthew Ebden	6	6
4	(Spain) Marcel Granollers (Argentina) Horacio Zeballos	1	4
7	(Germany) Kevin Krawietz (Germany) Tim Pütz	4	7^{7}	[7]
2	(Croatia) Ivan Dodig (United States) Austin Krajicek	6	6^{4}	[10]

Final
1	(India) Rohan Bopanna (Australia) Matthew Ebden	6^{3}	6	[10]
2	(Croatia) Ivan Dodig (United States) Austin Krajicek	7^{7}	3	[6]

=== Monte-Carlo Masters ===
==== Singles ====
Quarterfinals
1	(Serbia) Novak Djokovic	7	6
11	(Australia) Alex de Minaur	5	4
14	(France) Ugo Humbert	3	6	1
8	(Norway) Casper Ruud	6	4	6
12	(Greece) Stefanos Tsitsipas	6	6
15	Karen Khachanov	4	2
7	(Denmark) Holger Rune	4	7^{8}	3
2	(Italy) Jannik Sinner	6	6^{6}	6

Semifinals
1	(Serbia) Novak Djokovic	4	6	4
8	(Norway) Casper Ruud	6	1	6
12	(Greece) Stefanos Tsitsipas	6	3	6
2	(Italy) Jannik Sinner	4	6	4

Final
8	(Norway) Casper Ruud	1	4
12	(Greece) Stefanos Tsitsipas	6	6

==== Doubles ====
Semifinals
(El Salvador) Marcelo Arévalo (Croatia) Mate Pavić	7^{7}	5	[7]
Alt	(Brazil) Marcelo Melo (Germany) Alexander Zverev	6^{3}	7	[10]
3	(Spain) Marcel Granollers (Argentina) Horacio Zeballos	5	4
(Belgium) Sander Gillé (Belgium) Joran Vliegen	7	6

Final
Alt	(Brazil) Marcelo Melo (Germany) Alexander Zverev	7	3	[5]
(Belgium) Sander Gillé (Belgium) Joran Vliegen	5	6	[10]

=== Madrid Open ===
==== Singles ====
Quarterfinal
1	(Italy) Jannik Sinner
(Canada) Félix Auger-Aliassime	w/o
3	Daniil Medvedev	4	0^{r}
30	(Czech Republic) Jiří Lehečka	6	0
12	(United States) Taylor Fritz	6	3	6
21	(Argentina) Francisco Cerúndolo	1	6	3
7	Andrey Rublev	4	6	6
2	(Spain) Carlos Alcaraz	6	3	2

Semifinal
(Canada) Félix Auger-Aliassime	3
30	(Czech Republic) Jiří Lehečka	3^{r}
12	(United States) Taylor Fritz	4	3
7	Andrey Rublev	6	6

Final
(Canada) Félix Auger-Aliassime	6	5	5
7	Andrey Rublev	4	7	7

==== Doubles ====
Semifinals
(United States) Sebastian Korda (Australia) Jordan Thompson	3	6	[10]
11	(United Kingdom) Jamie Murray (New Zealand) Michael Venus	6	3	[8]
(Uruguay) Ariel Behar (Czech Republic) Adam Pavlásek	w/o
2	(Spain) Marcel Granollers (Argentina) Horacio Zeballos

Final
(United States) Sebastian Korda (Australia) Jordan Thompson	6	7^{9}
(Uruguay) Ariel Behar (Czech Republic) Adam Pavlásek	3	6^{7}

=== Italian Open ===
==== Singles ====
Quarterfinals
29	(Chile) Alejandro Tabilo	6	6
(China) Zhang Zhizhen	3	4
3	(Germany) Alexander Zverev	6	6
11	(United States) Taylor Fritz	4	3
6	(Greece) Stefanos Tsitsipas	6	5	4
21	(Chile) Nicolás Jarry	3	7	6
7	(Poland) Hubert Hurkacz	5	6	3
14	(United States) Tommy Paul	7	3	6

Semifinals
29	(Chile) Alejandro Tabilo	6	6^{4}	2
3	(Germany) Alexander Zverev	1	7^{7}	6
21	(Chile) Nicolás Jarry	6	6^{3}	6
14	(United States) Tommy Paul	3	7^{7}	3

Final
3	(Germany) Alexander Zverev	6	7
21	(Chile) Nicolás Jarry	4	5

==== Doubles ====
Semifinals
1	(Spain) Marcel Granollers (Argentina) Horacio Zeballos	6	6
(Kazakhstan) Alexander Bublik (United States) Ben Shelton	4	4
(El Salvador) Marcelo Arévalo (Croatia) Mate Pavić	6	7^{7}
(Italy) Simone Bolelli (Italy) Andrea Vavassori	2	6^{5}

Final
1	(Spain) Marcel Granollers (Argentina) Horacio Zeballos	6	6
(El Salvador) Marcelo Arévalo (Croatia) Mate Pavić	2	2

=== Canadian Open ===
==== Singles ====
Quarterfinals
1	(Italy) Jannik Sinner	3	6	2
5	Andrey Rublev	6	1	6
(Italy) Matteo Arnaldi	6	7
PR	(Japan) Kei Nishikori	4	5
(Australia) Alexei Popyrin	3	7^{7}	7
4	(Poland) Hubert Hurkacz	6	6^{5}	5
(United States) Sebastian Korda	7^{7}	1	6
2	(Germany) Alexander Zverev	6^{5}	6	4

Semifinals
5	Andrey Rublev	6	6
(Italy) Matteo Arnaldi	4	2
(Australia) Alexei Popyrin	7^{7}	6
(United States) Sebastian Korda	6^{0}	3

Final
5	Andrey Rublev	2	4
(Australia) Alexei Popyrin	6	6

==== Doubles ====
Semifinals
1	(Spain) Marcel Granollers (Argentina) Horacio Zeballos	6	2	[10]
4	(El Salvador) Marcelo Arévalo (Croatia) Mate Pavić	2	6	[1]
3	(United States) Rajeev Ram (United Kingdom) Joe Salisbury	6	4	[11]
14	(Monaco) Hugo Nys (Poland) Jan Zieliński	2	6	[9]

Final
1	(Spain) Marcel Granollers (Argentina) Horacio Zeballos	6	7^{7}
3	(United States) Rajeev Ram (United Kingdom) Joe Salisbury	2	6^{4}

=== Cincinnati Open ===
==== Singles ====
Quarterfinals
1	(Italy) Jannik Sinner	4	7	6
6	Andrey Rublev	6	5	4
3	(Germany) Alexander Zverev	3	7^{7}	7
12	(United States) Ben Shelton	6	6^{3}	5
5	(Poland) Hubert Hurkacz	3	0^{r}
(United States) Frances Tiafoe	6	0
(United Kingdom) Jack Draper	4	2
15	(Denmark) Holger Rune	6	6

Semifinals
1	(Italy) Jannik Sinner	7^{11}	5	7^{7}
3	(Germany) Alexander Zverev	6^{9}	7	6^{4}
(United States) Frances Tiafoe	4	6	7^{7}
15	(Denmark) Holger Rune	6	1	6^{4}

Final
1	(Italy) Jannik Sinner	7^{7}	6
(United States) Frances Tiafoe	6^{4}	2

==== Doubles ====
Semifinals
1	(Spain) Marcel Granollers (Argentina) Horacio Zeballos	6^{8}	6^{9}
WC	(United States) Mackenzie McDonald (United States) Alex Michelsen	7^{10}	7^{11}
4	(El Salvador) Marcelo Arévalo (Croatia) Mate Pavić	6^{6}	7^{7}	[10]
(Croatia) Ivan Dodig (United Kingdom) Jamie Murray	7^{8}	6^{3}	[5]

Final
WC	(United States) Mackenzie McDonald (United States) Alex Michelsen	2	4
4	(El Salvador) Marcelo Arévalo (Croatia) Mate Pavić	6	6

=== Shanghai Masters ===
==== Singles ====
Quarterfinals
1	(Italy) Jannik Sinner	6	6
5	Daniil Medvedev	1	4
3	(Spain) Carlos Alcaraz	6^{5}	5
30	(Czech Republic) Tomáš Macháč	7^{7}	7
(Czech Republic) Jakub Menšík	7^{7}	1	4
4	(Serbia) Novak Djokovic	6^{4}	6	6
7	(United States) Taylor Fritz	6	6
(Belgium) David Goffin	3	4

Semifinals
1	(Italy) Jannik Sinner	6	7
30	(Czech Republic) Tomáš Macháč	4	5
4	(Serbia) Novak Djokovic	6	7^{8}
7	(United States) Taylor Fritz	4	6^{6}

Final
1	(Italy) Jannik Sinner	7^{7}	6
4	(Serbia) Novak Djokovic	6^{4}	3

==== Doubles ====
Semifinals
(Czech Republic) Adam Pavlásek (Netherlands) Jean-Julien Rojer	6	5	[8]
(Argentina) Máximo González (Argentina) Andrés Molteni	4	7	[10]
(Mexico) Santiago González (France) Édouard Roger-Vasselin	7^{7}	4	[6]
(Netherlands) Wesley Koolhof (Croatia) Nikola Mektić	6^{3}	6	[10]

Final
(Argentina) Máximo González (Argentina) Andrés Molteni	4	4
(Netherlands) Wesley Koolhof (Croatia) Nikola Mektić	6	6

=== Paris Masters ===
==== Singles ====
Quarterfinals
13	(Denmark) Holger Rune	6	4	7
9	(Australia) Alex de Minaur	4	6	5
3	(Germany) Alexander Zverev	7	6
10	(Greece) Stefanos Tsitsipas	5	4
8	(Bulgaria) Grigor Dimitrov	2	3
Karen Khachanov	6	6
(Australia) Jordan Thompson	2	6^{4}
15	(France) Ugo Humbert	6	7^{7}

Semifinals
13	(Denmark) Holger Rune	3	6^{4}
3	(Germany) Alexander Zverev	6	7^{7}
Karen Khachanov	7^{8}	4	3
15	(France) Ugo Humbert	6^{6}	6	6

Final
3	(Germany) Alexander Zverev	6	6
15	(France) Ugo Humbert	2	2

==== Doubles ====
Semifinals
(United Kingdom) Neal Skupski (New Zealand) Michael Venus	2	4
6	(Netherlands) Wesley Koolhof (Croatia) Nikola Mektić	6	6
4	(Australia) Max Purcell (Australia) Jordan Thompson	3	4
Alt	(United Kingdom) Lloyd Glasspool (Czech Republic) Adam Pavlásek	6	6

Final
6	(Netherlands) Wesley Koolhof (Croatia) Nikola Mektić	3	6	[10]
Alt	(United Kingdom) Lloyd Glasspool (Czech Republic) Adam Pavlásek	6	3	[5]

== See also ==
- ATP Tour Masters 1000
- ATP Tour
- 2024 WTA 1000 tournaments
- WTA Tour
