= 2022 Georgia's Rome Challenger – Singles =

Singles
- 2022 Georgia's Rome Challenger

Final
- Champion: (China) Wu Yibing
- Runner-up: (United States) Ben Shelton
- Score: 7–5, 6–3

Events
Singles	Doubles
Georgia's Rome Challenger	· 2023 →

This was the first edition of the tournament.

Wu Yibing won the title after defeating Ben Shelton 7–5, 6–3 in the final. He did not lose a single set in the entire tournament.

== Seeds ==
1. (Japan) Yoshihito Nishioka (quarterfinals)
2. (United States) J. J. Wolf (quarterfinals)
3. (Ecuador) Emilio Gómez (first round)
4. (Argentina) Juan Pablo Ficovich (semifinals)
5. (Croatia) Borna Gojo (first round)
6. (United States) Michael Mmoh (first round)
7. (United States) Bjorn Fratangelo (quarterfinals)
8. (France) Enzo Couacaud (first round, retired)

== Draw ==
=== Key ===
- Q = Qualifier
- WC = Wild card
- LL = Lucky loser
- Alt = Alternate
- SE = Special exempt
- PR = Protected ranking
- ITF = ITF entry
- JE = Junior exempt
- w/o = Walkover
- r = Retired
- d = Defaulted
- SR = Special ranking

=== Finals ===
Semifinals
(Japan) Yasutaka Uchiyama	1	3
Q	(United States) Ben Shelton	6	6
4/SE	(Argentina) Juan Pablo Ficovich	1	0
(China) Wu Yibing	6	6

Final
Q	(United States) Ben Shelton	5	3
(China) Wu Yibing	7	6

=== Top half ===
First round
1	(Japan) Y Nishioka	6	6
Q	(United States) P Kypson	2	1
(United Kingdom) B Harris	2	1
(Canada) A Galarneau	6	6
(Australia) L Tu	3	3
(Japan) Y Uchiyama	6	6
(Chinese Taipei) Y-h Hsu	6	6
5	(Croatia) B Gojo	4	4
3	(Ecuador) E Gómez	4	6^{1}
Q	(United States) S Kirchheimer	6	7^{7}
Q	(United States) D Young	6	2	1
(United States) A Kovacevic	4	6	6
Q	(United States) B Shelton	4	6	6
WC	(United States) G Nanda	6	2	3
(United States) A Rybakov	6	6
8	(France) E Couacaud	3	5^{r}

Second round
1	(Japan) Y Nishioka	6	6
(Canada) A Galarneau	4	3
(Japan) Y Uchiyama	7^{7}	6
(Chinese Taipei) Y-h Hsu	6^{4}	2
Q	(United States) S Kirchheimer	3	6	4
(United States) A Kovacevic	6	4	6
Q	(United States) B Shelton	7^{7}	6
(United States) A Rybakov	6^{4}	3

Quarterfinals
1	(Japan) Y Nishioka	6	6^{2}	1
(Japan) Y Uchiyama	3	7^{7}	6
(United States) A Kovacevic	6^{2}	5
Q	(United States) B Shelton	7^{7}	7

Semifinals
(Japan) Y Uchiyama	1	3
Q	(United States) B Shelton	6	6

=== Bottom half ===
First round
7	(United States) B Fratangelo	6	6
Q	(Greece) M Pervolarakis	4	0
Alt	(Lebanon) H Habib	6^{2}	6	7^{8}
(Australia) R Hijikata	7^{7}	3	6^{6}
(United States) K Smith	6	1	1
(Ecuador) R Quiroz	4	6	6
(United Kingdom) A McHugh	2	2
4/SE	(Argentina) JP Ficovich	6	6
6/WC	(United States) M Mmoh	3	6	4
(United States) U Blanch	6	1	6
(China) Y Wu	6	4
(Tunisia) M Jaziri	4	0^{r}
WC	(United States) S Riffice	6^{2}	6^{2}
Alt	(Japan) S Mochizuki	7^{7}	7^{7}
Q	(China) J Shang	1	2
2	(United States) J. J. Wolf	6	6

Second round
7	(United States) B Fratangelo	6	5	6
Alt	(Lebanon) H Habib	3	7	2
(Ecuador) R Quiroz
4/SE	(Argentina) JP Ficovich	w/o
(United States) U Blanch	3	4
(China) Y Wu	6	6
Alt	(Japan) S Mochizuki	3	6^{1}
2	(United States) J. J. Wolf	6	7^{7}

Quarterfinals
7	(United States) B Fratangelo	4	6^{5}
4/SE	(Argentina) JP Ficovich	6	7^{7}
(China) Y Wu	6	6
2	(United States) J. J. Wolf	4	1

Semifinals
4/SE	(Argentina) JP Ficovich	1	0
(China) Y Wu	6	6
