= 2023 Coosa Valley Open – Doubles =

Doubles
- 2023 Coosa Valley Open

Final
- Champions: (United Kingdom) Luke Johnson (Netherlands) Sem Verbeek
- Runners-up: (Brazil) Gabriel Décamps (United States) Alex Rybakov
- Score: 6–2, 6–2

Events
Singles	Doubles
← 2022 ·	Coosa Valley Open	· 2024 →

Enzo Couacaud and Andrew Harris were the defending champions but chose not to defend their title.

Luke Johnson and Sem Verbeek won the title after defeating Gabriel Décamps and Alex Rybakov 6–2, 6–2 in the final.

== Seeds ==
1. (United States) Robert Galloway / (United States) Christian Harrison (quarterfinals)
2. (United Kingdom) Luke Johnson / (Netherlands) Sem Verbeek (champions)
3. (Israel) Daniel Cukierman / (United Kingdom) Joshua Paris (semifinals)
4. (United Kingdom) Scott Duncan / (United Kingdom) Marcus Willis (quarterfinals)

== Draw ==
=== Key ===
- Q = Qualifier
- WC = Wild card
- LL = Lucky loser
- Alt = Alternate
- ITF = ITF entry
- PR = Protected ranking
- SR = Special ranking
- SE = Special exempt
- JE = Junior exempt
- JR = Junior Accelerator Programme entrant
- CO = College Accelerator Programme entrant
- NG = Next Gen Accelerator Program entrant
- w/o = Walkover
- r = Retired
- d = Defaulted

First round
1	(United States) R Galloway (United States) C Harrison	7^{7}	6
(Germany) S Fanselow (United States) A Perez	6^{1}	3
WC	(United States) U Blanch (United States) P Kypson	4	2
(Brazil) G Décamps (United States) A Rybakov	6	6
3	(Israel) D Cukierman (United Kingdom) J Paris	6	6
(Japan) S Hazawa (Japan) S Mochizuki	1	0
WC	(Serbia) S Latinović (United States) Nick Watson	4	4
(Germany) M Moraing (Australia) A Vukic	6	6
(South Korea) S-c Hong (Japan) S Shimabukuro	4	4
(Canada) A Galarneau (Israel) E Leshem	6	6
(Australia) R Hijikata (United States) A Martin
4	(United Kingdom) S Duncan (United Kingdom) M Willis	w/o
(United States) A Michelsen (Canada) B Sigouin	3	6	[10]
(Tunisia) A Dougaz (Germany) T Sandkaulen	6	4	[5]
(Spain) D Rincón (Germany) H Squire	7^{10}	3	[6]
2	(United Kingdom) L Johnson (Netherlands) S Verbeek	6^{8}	6	[10]

Quarterfinals
1	(United States) R Galloway (United States) C Harrison	5	4
(Brazil) G Décamps (United States) A Rybakov	7	6
3	(Israel) D Cukierman (United Kingdom) J Paris	w/o
(Germany) M Moraing (Australia) A Vukic
(Canada) A Galarneau (Israel) E Leshem	6	3	[11]
4	(United Kingdom) S Duncan (United Kingdom) M Willis	4	6	[9]
(United States) A Michelsen (Canada) B Sigouin	7	2	[9]
2	(United Kingdom) L Johnson (Netherlands) S Verbeek	5	6	[11]

Semifinals
(Brazil) G Décamps (United States) A Rybakov	7^{7}	6
3	(Israel) D Cukierman (United Kingdom) J Paris	6^{5}	3
(Canada) A Galarneau (Israel) E Leshem	1	2
2	(United Kingdom) L Johnson (Netherlands) S Verbeek	6	6

Final
(Brazil) G Décamps (United States) A Rybakov	2	2
2	(United Kingdom) L Johnson (Netherlands) S Verbeek	6	6
