= 2024 Hall of Fame Open – Doubles =

Doubles
- 2024 Hall of Fame Open

Final
- Champions: (Sweden) André Göransson (Netherlands) Sem Verbeek
- Runners-up: (United States) Robert Cash (United States) James Tracy
- Score: 6–3, 6–4

Events
Singles	Doubles
- Hall of Fame Open

André Göransson and Sem Verbeek defeated Robert Cash and James Tracy in the final, 6–3, 6–4 to win the doubles tennis title at the 2024 Hall of Fame Open. It was the first ATP Tour doubles title for Verbeek and the second for Göransson.

Nathaniel Lammons and Jackson Withrow were the defending champions, but lost to Anirudh Chandrasekar and Arjun Kadhe in the first round.

== Seeds ==
1. (United States) Nathaniel Lammons / (United States) Jackson Withrow (first round)
2. (United Kingdom) Julian Cash / (United States) Robert Galloway (quarterfinals)
3. (Ecuador) Diego Hidalgo / (Australia) John-Patrick Smith (first round)
4. (United States) William Blumberg / (Australia) Rinky Hijikata (first round)
5. (United States) Evan King / (United States) Reese Stalder (quarterfinals)
6. (Sweden) André Göransson / (Netherlands) Sem Verbeek (champions)
7. (United States) Ryan Seggerman / (United States) Patrik Trhac (first round)
8. (India) Rithvik Choudary Bollipalli / (India) Niki Kaliyanda Poonacha (first round)

== Draw ==
Key

- Q = Qualifier
- WC = Wild card
- LL = Lucky loser
- Alt = Alternate
- ITF = ITF entry
- PR = Protected ranking
- SR = Special ranking
- SE = Special exempt
- JE = Junior exempt
- JR = Junior Accelerator Programme entrant
- CO = College Accelerator Programme entrant
- NG = Next Gen Accelerator Program entrant
- w/o = Walkover
- r = Retired
- d = Defaulted

=== Draw ===
First round
1	(United States) N Lammons (United States) J Withrow	3	6	[7]
(India) A Chandrasekar (India) A Kadhe	6	3	[10]
(United States) C Harrison (United States) V Kirkov	7	6
7	(United States) R Seggerman (United States) P Trhac	5	4
3	(Ecuador) D Hidalgo (Australia) J-P Smith	2	5
WC	(United States) R Cash (United States) J Tracy	6	7
(France) C Lestienne (United States) Z Svajda	4	3
5	(United States) E King (United States) R Stalder	6	6
6	(Sweden) A Göransson (Netherlands) S Verbeek	6	4	[10]
WC	(United Kingdom) J Paris (India) R Ramanathan	3	6	[8]
(United States) M McDonald (United States) A Michelsen	6	4	[10]
4	(United States) W Blumberg (Australia) R Hijikata	4	6	[3]
8	(India) RC Bollipalli (India) N Kaliyanda Poonacha	1	4
(Australia) L Saville (Australia) A Vukic	6	6
(France) A Mannarino (France) H Mayot	3	4
2	(United Kingdom) J Cash (United States) R Galloway	6	6

Quarterfinals
(India) A Chandrasekar (India) A Kadhe	6	1	[10]
(United States) C Harrison (United States) V Kirkov	4	6	[7]
WC	(United States) R Cash (United States) J Tracy	7^{8}	7
5	(United States) E King (United States) R Stalder	6^{6}	5
6	(Sweden) A Göransson (Netherlands) S Verbeek	7	6
(United States) M McDonald (United States) A Michelsen	5	4
(Australia) L Saville (Australia) A Vukic	6	6^{3}	[13]
2	(United Kingdom) J Cash (United States) R Galloway	4	7^{7}	[11]

Semifinals
(India) A Chandrasekar (India) A Kadhe	4	3
WC	(United States) R Cash (United States) J Tracy	6	6
6	(Sweden) A Göransson (Netherlands) S Verbeek	7^{7}	6
(Australia) L Saville (Australia) A Vukic	6^{3}	3

Final
WC	(United States) R Cash (United States) J Tracy	3	4
6	(Sweden) A Göransson (Netherlands) S Verbeek	6	6
