= 2022 Georgia's Rome Challenger – Doubles =

Doubles
- 2022 Georgia's Rome Challenger

Final
- Champions: (France) Enzo Couacaud (Australia) Andrew Harris
- Runners-up: (Philippines) Ruben Gonzales (United States) Reese Stalder
- Score: 6–4, 6–2

Events
Singles	Doubles
Georgia's Rome Challenger	· 2023 →

This was the first edition of the tournament.

Enzo Couacaud and Andrew Harris won the title after defeating Ruben Gonzales and Reese Stalder 6–4, 6–2 in the final.

== Seeds ==
1. (India) Sriram Balaji / (India) Jeevan Nedunchezhiyan (quarterfinals)
2. (Philippines) Ruben Gonzales / (United States) Reese Stalder (final)
3. (Australia) Dane Sweeny / (Australia) Li Tu (withdrew)
4. (Australia) Rinky Hijikata / (Chinese Taipei) Hsu Yu-hsiou (semifinals)
5. (France) Enzo Couacaud / (Australia) Andrew Harris (champions)

== Draw ==
=== Key ===
- Q = Qualifier
- WC = Wild card
- LL = Lucky loser
- Alt = Alternate
- ITF = ITF entry
- PR = Protected ranking
- SR = Special ranking
- SE = Special exempt
- JE = Junior exempt
- JR = Junior Accelerator Programme entrant
- CO = College Accelerator Programme entrant
- NG = Next Gen Accelerator Program entrant
- w/o = Walkover
- r = Retired
- d = Defaulted

First round
1	(India) S Balaji (India) J Nedunchezhiyan	4	6	[10]
(Japan) T Matsui (Japan) K Uesugi	6	3	[7]
(Japan) Y Nishioka (Japan) S Shimabukuro	6	6
(Japan) S Mochizuki (China) J Shang	3	1
5/PR	(France) E Couacaud (Australia) A Harris	6	2
Alt	(Canada) T Baadi (India) M Sasikumar	0	0^{r}
Alt	(United States) N Chappell (Canada) B Sigouin	6	2	[10]
Alt	(Croatia) B Gojo (United Kingdom) B Harris	2	6	[4]
(Switzerland) L Margaroli (Japan) Y Uchiyama	3	6^{5}
(United States) B Shelton (United States) K Smith	6	7^{7}
(Canada) L Draxl (United States) G Nanda	4	6	[5]
4	(Australia) R Hijikata (Chinese Taipei) Y-h Hsu	6	3	[10]
(Canada) A Galarneau (United States) A Rybakov	6	6^{9}	[8]
(United States) A Kovacevic (Greece) M Pervolarakis	3	7^{11}	[10]
Alt	(United States) Ezekiel Clark (United States) J Sheehy	3	6^{1}
2	(Philippines) R Gonzales (United States) R Stalder	6	7^{7}

Quarterfinals
1	(India) S Balaji (India) J Nedunchezhiyan	4	2
(Japan) Y Nishioka (Japan) S Shimabukuro	6	6
5/PR	(France) E Couacaud (Australia) A Harris	6	6
Alt	(United States) N Chappell (Canada) B Sigouin	2	2
(United States) B Shelton (United States) K Smith	1	4
4	(Australia) R Hijikata (Chinese Taipei) Y-h Hsu	6	6
(United States) A Kovacevic (Greece) M Pervolarakis	3	3
2	(Philippines) R Gonzales (United States) R Stalder	6	6

Semifinals
(Japan) Y Nishioka (Japan) S Shimabukuro	6^{1}	6^{5}
5/PR	(France) E Couacaud (Australia) A Harris	7^{7}	7^{7}
4	(Australia) R Hijikata (Chinese Taipei) Y-h Hsu	6^{4}	5
2	(Philippines) R Gonzales (United States) R Stalder	7^{7}	7

Final
5/PR	(France) E Couacaud (Australia) A Harris	6	6
2	(Philippines) R Gonzales (United States) R Stalder	4	2
