= 2024 Masters =

2024 Masters may refer to:

- 2024 Masters Tournament, the 88th edition of The Masters golf tournament, held at Augusta National Golf Club in Georgia, United States
- 2024 Masters (darts), the 12th staging of the professional darts tournament held by the Professional Darts Corporation
- 2024 Masters (snooker), the 50th edition of the professional invitational snooker tournament held in London, England
- 2024 ATP Masters 1000 tournaments, series of nine top-tier men’s tennis tournaments held during the 2024 season

== See also ==
- Masters (disambiguation)
