= 2023 Coosa Valley Open =

- Date: 20–26 February
- Edition: 2nd
- Surface: Hard (indoor)
- Location: Rome, Georgia, United States

Champions

Singles
- (Australia) Jordan Thompson

Doubles
- (United Kingdom) Luke Johnson / (Netherlands) Sem Verbeek
← 2022 ·	Coosa Valley Open	· 2024 →

The 2023 Coosa Valley Open was a professional tennis tournament played on indoor hard courts. It was the second edition of the tournament which was part of the 2023 ATP Challenger Tour. It took place in Rome, Georgia, United States between February 20 and February 26, 2023.

== Singles main draw entrants ==
=== Seeds ===
Country	Player	Rank^{1}	Seed
AUS	Jordan Thompson	93	1
AUS	Rinky Hijikata	116	2
AUS	Aleksandar Vukic	171	3
FRA	Enzo Couacaud	183	4
CAN	Alexis Galarneau	220	5
USA	Tennys Sandgren	223	6
GER	Dominik Koepfer	234	7
KOR	Hong Seong-chan	245	8

- ^{1} Rankings as of February 13, 2023.

=== Other entrants ===
The following players received wildcards into the singles main draw:

- (United States) Ryan Harrison
- (United States) Alex Michelsen
- (United States) Nathan Ponwith

The following player received entry into the singles main draw using a protected ranking:

- (United States) Christian Harrison

The following players received entry into the singles main draw as alternates:

- (Israel) Daniel Cukierman
- (Ukraine) Illya Marchenko

The following players received entry from the qualifying draw:

- (United States) Gabriele Brancatelli
- (Germany) Sebastian Fanselow
- (United States) Toby Kodat
- (United States) Patrick Kypson
- (United States) Keegan Smith
- (Hong Kong) Coleman Wong

== Champions ==
=== Singles ===
- (Australia) Jordan Thompson def. (United States) Alex Michelsen 6–4, 6–2.

=== Doubles ===
- (United Kingdom) Luke Johnson / (Netherlands) Sem Verbeek def. (Brazil) Gabriel Décamps / (United States) Alex Rybakov 6–2, 6–2.
