= 2022 Georgia's Rome Challenger =

- Date: 11–17 July
- Edition: 1st
- Surface: Hard (indoor)
- Location: Rome, Georgia, United States

Champions

Singles
- (China) Wu Yibing

Doubles
- (France) Enzo Couacaud / (Australia) Andrew Harris
Georgia's Rome Challenger	· 2023 →

The 2022 Georgia's Rome Challenger was a professional tennis tournament played on indoor hard courts. It was the first edition of the tournament which was part of the 2022 ATP Challenger Tour. It took place in Rome, Georgia, United States between July 11 and July 17, 2022.

== Singles main draw entrants ==
=== Seeds ===
Country	Player	Rank^{1}	Seed
JPN	Yoshihito Nishioka	101	1
USA	J. J. Wolf	116	2
ECU	Emilio Gómez	151	3
ARG	Juan Pablo Ficovich	163	4
CRO	Borna Gojo	174	5
USA	Michael Mmoh	177	6
USA	Bjorn Fratangelo	196	7
FRA	Enzo Couacaud	206	8

- ^{1} Rankings as of June 27, 2022.

=== Other entrants ===
The following players received wildcards into the singles main draw:

- (United States) Michael Mmoh
- (United States) Govind Nanda
- (United States) Sam Riffice

The following player received entry into the singles main draw as a special exempt:

- (Argentina) Juan Pablo Ficovich

The following players received entry into the singles main draw as alternates:

- (Lebanon) Hady Habib
- (Japan) Shintaro Mochizuki

The following players received entry from the qualifying draw:

- (United States) Strong Kirchheimer
- (United States) Patrick Kypson
- (Greece) Michail Pervolarakis
- (China) Shang Juncheng
- (United States) Ben Shelton
- (United States) Donald Young

== Champions ==
=== Singles ===
- (China) Wu Yibing def. (United States) Ben Shelton 7–5, 6–3.

=== Doubles ===
- (France) Enzo Couacaud / (Australia) Andrew Harris def. (Philippines) Ruben Gonzales / (United States) Reese Stalder 6–4, 6–2.
