= 2023 Coosa Valley Open – Singles =

Singles
- 2023 Coosa Valley Open

Final
- Champion: (Australia) Jordan Thompson
- Runner-up: (United States) Alex Michelsen
- Score: 6–4, 6–2

Events
Singles	Doubles
- Coosa Valley Open

Wu Yibing was the defending champion but chose not to defend his title.

Jordan Thompson won the title after defeating Alex Michelsen 6–4, 6–2 in the final.

== Seeds ==
1. (Australia) Jordan Thompson (champion)
2. (Australia) Rinky Hijikata (first round)
3. (Australia) Aleksandar Vukic (second round)
4. (France) Enzo Couacaud (first round)
5. (Canada) Alexis Galarneau (first round)
6. (United States) Tennys Sandgren (first round, retired)
7. (Germany) Dominik Koepfer (first round)
8. (South Korea) Hong Seong-chan (semifinals)

== Draw ==
Key

- Q = Qualifier
- WC = Wild card
- LL = Lucky loser
- Alt = Alternate
- ITF = ITF entry
- PR = Protected ranking
- SR = Special ranking
- SE = Special exempt
- JE = Junior exempt
- JR = Junior Accelerator Programme entrant
- CO = College Accelerator Programme entrant
- NG = Next Gen Accelerator Program entrant
- w/o = Walkover
- r = Retired
- d = Defaulted

=== Finals ===
Semifinals
1	(Australia) Jordan Thompson	7^{7}	7^{7}
(United States) Zachary Svajda	6^{3}	6^{5}
8	(South Korea) Hong Seong-chan	6	5	1
WC	(United States) Alex Michelsen	4	7	6

Final
1	(Australia) Jordan Thompson	6	6
WC	(United States) Alex Michelsen	4	2

=== Top half ===
First round
1	(Australia) J Thompson	6	6
(Tunisia) A Dougaz	3	4
(Spain) D Rincón	4	2
(Germany) H Squire	6	6
Q	(United States) P Kypson	6	7^{7}
Q	(United States) K Smith	1	6^{4}
(United Kingdom) A Gray	6	6
5	(Canada) A Galarneau	4	4
3	(Australia) A Vukic	6	3	6
(United States) U Blanch	3	6	1
(United States) Z Svajda	6	6
Q	(Hong Kong) C Wong	3	1
Alt	(Ukraine) I Marchenko	3	6	3
WC	(United States) R Harrison	6	3	6
(Germany) Elmar Ejupovic	6	3
6	(United States) T Sandgren	4	2^{r}

Second round
1	(Australia) J Thompson	6	6
(Germany) H Squire	4	1
Q	(United States) P Kypson	6^{3}	3
(United Kingdom) A Gray	7^{7}	6
3	(Australia) A Vukic	3	3
(United States) Z Svajda	6	6
WC	(United States) R Harrison	6	6^{5}	2
(Germany) E Ejupovic	3	7^{7}	6

Quarterfinals
1	(Australia) J Thompson	6	6
(United Kingdom) A Gray	4	2
(United States) Z Svajda	6	3	6
(Germany) E Ejupovic	1	6	3

Semifinals
1	(Australia) J Thompson	7^{7}	7^{7}
(United States) Z Svajda	6^{3}	6^{5}

=== Bottom half ===
First round
8	(South Korea) S-c Hong	6	6
Q	(United States) Gabriele Brancatelli	1	3
(Brazil) G Décamps	6	6
Alt	(Israel) D Cukierman	1	2
Q	(Germany) S Fanselow	6	3	3
(Japan) S Shimabukuro	2	6	6
Q	(United States) TA Kodat	6	6
4	(France) E Couacaud	4	3
7	(Germany) D Koepfer	3	1
WC	(United States) A Michelsen	6	6
PR	(United States) C Harrison	6	4	3
(Germany) M Moraing	1	6	6
(Japan) S Mochizuki	7^{7}	3	2
(Israel) E Leshem	6^{4}	6	6
WC	(United States) Nathan Ponwith	6	6^{5}	6
2	(Australia) R Hijikata	4	7^{7}	3

Second round
8	(South Korea) S-c Hong	6	6
(Brazil) G Décamps	1	0
(Japan) S Shimabukuro	4	6	5
Q	(United States) TA Kodat	6	3	7
WC	(United States) A Michelsen	6^{4}	3
(Germany) M Moraing	7^{7}	1^{r}
(Israel) E Leshem	6	6
WC	(United States) N Ponwith	3	2

Quarterfinals
8	(South Korea) S-c Hong	4	6	6
Q	(United States) TA Kodat	6	3	4
WC	(United States) A Michelsen	7	6
(Israel) E Leshem	5	3

Semifinals
8	(South Korea) S-c Hong	6	5	1
WC	(United States) A Michelsen	4	7	6
