= 2024 Hall of Fame Open =

- Date: July 15–21
- Edition: 48th
- Category: ATP Tour 250
- Prize money: $661,585
- Surface: Grass / outdoor
- Location: Newport, Rhode Island, United States
- Venue: International Tennis Hall of Fame

Champions

Singles
- (United States) Marcos Giron

Doubles
- (Sweden) André Göransson / (Netherlands) Sem Verbeek
- Hall of Fame Open

The 2024 Hall of Fame Open (also known as the Infosys Hall of Fame Open for sponsorship reasons) was a men's professional tennis tournament played on outdoor grass courts. It was the 48th and final edition of the tournament as an ATP 250 event on the 2024 ATP Tour. It took place at the International Tennis Hall of Fame in Newport, Rhode Island, United States, from July 15 through July 21, 2024. Marcos Giron won the singles final, defeating Alex Michelsen to claim his first ATP Tour title. André Göransson and Sem Verbeek won the doubles title with a victory over Robert Cash and JJ Tracy in the final.

== Champions ==
=== Singles ===
- (United States) Marcos Giron def. (United States) Alex Michelsen, 6–7^{(4–7)}, 6–3, 7–5

=== Doubles ===
- (Sweden) André Göransson / (Netherlands) Sem Verbeek def. (United States) Robert Cash / (United States) James Tracy, 6–3, 6–4

== Singles main draw entrants ==
=== Seeds ===
Country	Player	Rank^{1}	Seed
FRA	Adrian Mannarino	24	1
USA	Marcos Giron	46	2
USA	Alex Michelsen	55	3
USA	Christopher Eubanks	62	4
USA	Brandon Nakashima	65	5
AUS	Aleksandar Vukic	69	6
FRA	Arthur Rinderknech	76	7
AUS	Rinky Hijikata	77	8

- ^{1} Rankings are as of 1 July 2024.

=== Other entrants ===
The following players received wildcards into the main draw:

- (United States) Reilly Opelka
- (United States) Ethan Quinn
- (United States) Eliot Spizzirri

The following players received entry from the qualifying draw:

- (Australia) Alex Bolt
- (United Kingdom) Billy Harris
- (Australia) Marc Polmans
- (Australia) Li Tu

=== Withdrawals ===
- (Kazakhstan) Alexander Bublik → replaced by (France) Benoît Paire
- (France) Arthur Cazaux → replaced by (United States) Zachary Svajda
- (Australia) James Duckworth → replaced by (Moldova) Radu Albot
- (France) Giovanni Mpetshi Perricard → replaced by (France) Harold Mayot
- (China) Shang Juncheng → replaced by (United States) Emilio Nava
- (Australia) Jordan Thompson → replaced by (Hong Kong) Coleman Wong

== Doubles main draw entrants ==
=== Seeds ===
Country	Player	Country	Player	Rank	Seed
USA	Nathaniel Lammons	USA	Jackson Withrow	46	1
GBR	Julian Cash	USA	Robert Galloway	74	2
ECU	Diego Hidalgo	AUS	John-Patrick Smith	126	3
USA	William Blumberg	AUS	Rinky Hijikata	142	4
USA	Evan King	USA	Reese Stalder	152	5
SWE	André Göransson	NED	Sem Verbeek	165	6
USA	Ryan Seggerman	USA	Patrik Trhac	199	7
IND	Rithvik Choudary Bollipalli	IND	Niki Kaliyanda Poonacha	218	8

- Rankings are as of 1 July 2024.

=== Other entrants ===
The following pairs received wildcards into the doubles main draw:

- (United States) Robert Cash / (United States) James Tracy
- (United Kingdom) Joshua Paris / (India) Ramkumar Ramanathan

=== Withdrawals ===
- (Finland) Harri Heliövaara / (United Kingdom) Henry Patten → replaced by (United States) Christian Harrison / (United States) Vasil Kirkov
- (France) Constant Lestienne / (China) Shang Juncheng → replaced by (France) Constant Lestienne / (United States) Zachary Svajda
- (France) Nicolas Mahut / (France) Adrian Mannarino → replaced by (France) Adrian Mannarino / (France) Harold Mayot
- (Australia) Max Purcell / (Australia) Jordan Thompson → replaced by (Australia) Luke Saville / (Australia) Aleksandar Vukic
