= 2024 Hall of Fame Open – Singles =

Singles
- 2024 Hall of Fame Open

Final
- Champion: (United States) Marcos Giron
- Runner-up: (United States) Alex Michelsen
- Score: 6–7^{(4–7)}, 6–3, 7–5

Details
- Draw: 28
- Seeds: 8

Events
Singles	Doubles
← 2023 ·	Hall of Fame Open	· 2025 →

Marcos Giron defeated Alex Michelsen in the final, 6–7^{(4–7)}, 6–3, 7–5 to win the singles tennis title at the 2024 Hall of Fame Open. Giron saved a championship point en route to his first ATP Tour singles title. Michelsen finished as runner-up at the tournament for the second year in a row.

Adrian Mannarino was the defending champion, but lost to Reilly Opelka in the second round. Opelka became the lowest-ranked player to reach the semifinals of an ATP Tour level event.

== Seeds ==
The top four seeds received a bye into the second round.

1. (France) Adrian Mannarino (second round)
2. (United States) Marcos Giron (champion)
3. (United States) Alex Michelsen (final)
4. (United States) Christopher Eubanks (semifinals)
5. (United States) Brandon Nakashima (second round)
6. (Australia) Aleksandar Vukic (quarterfinals)
7. (France) Arthur Rinderknech (second round)
8. (Australia) Rinky Hijikata (first round)

== Draw ==
=== Key ===
- Q = Qualifier
- WC = Wild card
- LL = Lucky loser
- Alt = Alternate
- ITF = ITF entry
- PR = Protected ranking
- SR = Special ranking
- SE = Special exempt
- JE = Junior exempt
- JR = Junior Accelerator Programme entrant
- CO = College Accelerator Programme entrant
- NG = Next Gen Accelerator Program entrant
- w/o = Walkover
- r = Retired
- d = Defaulted

=== Finals ===
Semifinals
WC	(United States) Reilly Opelka	2	0
3	(United States) Alex Michelsen	6	6
4	(United States) Christopher Eubanks	4	6	2
2	(United States) Marcos Giron	6	3	6

Final
3	(United States) Alex Michelsen	7^{7}	3	5
2	(United States) Marcos Giron	6^{4}	6	7

=== Top half ===
First round
(France) C Lestienne	1	6	6^{2}
WC	(United States) R Opelka	6	2	7^{7}
Q	(United Kingdom) B Harris	7^{7}	7
(Canada) G Diallo	6^{4}	5
(United States) M McDonald	4	7^{7}	6
8	(Australia) R Hijikata	6	6^{4}	2
(Moldova) R Albot	4	6	6^{4}
(United States) M Cressy	6	4	7^{7}
(France) H Mayot	6^{1}	4
(United States) A Kovacevic	7^{7}	6
(Japan) S Mochizuki	3	6^{5}
7	(France) A Rinderknech	6	7^{7}

Second round
1	(France) A Mannarino	4	6	4
WC	(United States) R Opelka	6	3	6
Q	(United Kingdom) B Harris	3	4
(United States) M McDonald	6	6
3	(United States) A Michelsen	6	6
(United States) M Cressy	4	4
(United States) A Kovacevic	6	3	7
7	(France) A Rinderknech	3	6	5

Quarterfinals
WC	(United States) R Opelka	4	6	6
(United States) M McDonald	6	3	4
3	(United States) A Michelsen	6	6
(United States) A Kovacevic	4	4

Semifinals
WC	(United States) R Opelka	2	0
3	(United States) A Michelsen	6	6

=== Bottom half ===
First round
6	(Australia) A Vukic	6	6
(Hong Kong) C Wong	1	2
WC	(United States) E Spizzirri	6	7^{7}
Q	(Australia) L Tu	1	6^{4}
WC	(United States) E Quinn	6	6^{3}	6
Q	(Australia) M Polmans	3	7^{7}	1
5	(United States) B Nakashima	7	6
(United States) E Nava	5	2
(Czech Republic) J Menšík	2	4
Q	(Australia) A Bolt	6	6
(United States) Z Svajda	3	6	6^{4}
(France) B Paire	6	3	7^{7}

Second round
6	(Australia) A Vukic	6	7^{7}
WC	(United States) E Spizzirri	2	6^{3}
WC	(United States) E Quinn	6^{4}	6	3
4	(United States) C Eubanks	7^{7}	3	6
5	(United States) B Nakashima	6^{2}	4
Q	(Australia) A Bolt	7^{7}	6
(France) B Paire	6	5	4
2	(United States) M Giron	4	7	6

Quarterfinals
6	(Australia) A Vukic	2	6	6^{3}
4	(United States) C Eubanks	6	4	7^{7}
Q	(Australia) A Bolt	4	1
2	(United States) M Giron	6	6

Semifinals
4	(United States) C Eubanks	4	6	2
2	(United States) M Giron	6	3	6

== Qualifying ==
=== Seeds ===
1. (United Kingdom) Billy Harris (qualified)
2. (Australia) Tristan Schoolkate (qualifying competition)
3. (South Korea) Hong Seong-chan (first round)
4. (Netherlands) Gijs Brouwer (first round)
5. (United States) Mitchell Krueger (qualifying competition)
6. (Australia) Marc Polmans (qualified)
7. (Australia) Li Tu (qualified)
8. (Ukraine) Illya Marchenko (first round)

=== Qualifiers ===
1. (United Kingdom) Billy Harris
2. (Australia) Marc Polmans
3. (Australia) Alex Bolt
4. (Australia) Li Tu

=== Qualifying draw ===
==== First qualifier ====
First round
1	(United Kingdom) Billy Harris	6	6
(Australia) Bernard Tomic	3	4
WC	(United States) Aidan Mayo	6	6
8	(Ukraine) Illya Marchenko	2	2

Qualifying competition
1	(United Kingdom) Billy Harris	6	3	6
WC	(United States) Aidan Mayo	0	6	3

==== Second qualifier ====
First round
2	(Australia) Tristan Schoolkate	6	6
(Japan) James Trotter	2	3
WC	(United States) Adhithya Ganesan	2	2
6	(Australia) Marc Polmans	6	6

Qualifying competition
2	(Australia) Tristan Schoolkate	4	6^{3}
6	(Australia) Marc Polmans	6	7^{7}

==== Third qualifier ====
First round
3	(South Korea) Hong Seong-chan	4	3
(Australia) Alex Bolt	6	6
(United States) Thai-Son Kwiatkowski	3	6^{4}
5	(United States) Mitchell Krueger	6	7^{7}

Qualifying competition
(Australia) Alex Bolt	6	7^{8}
5	(United States) Mitchell Krueger	3	6^{6}

==== Fourth qualifier ====
First round
4	(Netherlands) Gijs Brouwer	6	3	2
(United Kingdom) Jacob Fearnley	4	6	6
(United Kingdom) Charles Broom	1	5
7	(Australia) Li Tu	6	7

Qualifying competition
(United Kingdom) Jacob Fearnley	4	3
7	(Australia) Li Tu	6	6
