= 2024 Cincinnati Open – Men's doubles =

Men's doubles
- 2024 Cincinnati Open

Final
- Champions: (El Salvador) Marcelo Arévalo (Croatia) Mate Pavić
- Runners-up: (United States) Mackenzie McDonald (United States) Alex Michelsen
- Score: 6–2, 6–4

Details
- Draw: 28 (3 WC )
- Seeds: 8

Events
Singles	men	women
Doubles	men	women
← 2023 ·	Cincinnati Open	· 2025 →

Marcelo Arévalo and Mate Pavić defeated Mackenzie McDonald and Alex Michelsen in the final, 6–2, 6–4 to win the men's doubles tennis title at the 2024 Cincinnati Open.

Máximo González and Andrés Molteni were the defending champions, but lost in the first round to Hugo Nys and Jan Zieliński.

Marcel Granollers and Horacio Zeballos retained the ATP No. 1 doubles ranking after Matthew Ebden lost in the second round.

== Seeds ==
The top four seeds received a bye into the second round.

1. (Spain) Marcel Granollers / (Argentina) Horacio Zeballos (semifinals)
2. (India) Rohan Bopanna / (Australia) Matthew Ebden (second round)
3. (United States) Rajeev Ram / (United Kingdom) Joe Salisbury (quarterfinals)
4. (El Salvador) Marcelo Arévalo / (Croatia) Mate Pavić (champions)
5. (Italy) Simone Bolelli / (Italy) Andrea Vavassori (second round)
6. (Mexico) Santiago González / (France) Édouard Roger-Vasselin (second round)
7. (Finland) Harri Heliövaara / (United Kingdom) Henry Patten (quarterfinals)
8. (Australia) Max Purcell / (Australia) Jordan Thompson (second round, withdrew)

== Draw ==
=== Key ===
- Q = Qualifier
- WC = Wild card
- LL = Lucky loser
- Alt = Alternate
- ITF = ITF entry
- PR = Protected ranking
- SR = Special ranking
- SE = Special exempt
- JE = Junior exempt
- JR = Junior Accelerator Programme entrant
- CO = College Accelerator Programme entrant
- NG = Next Gen Accelerator Program entrant
- w/o = Walkover
- r = Retired
- d = Defaulted

=== Finals ===
Semifinals
1	(Spain) Marcel Granollers (Argentina) Horacio Zeballos	6^{8}	6^{9}
WC	(United States) Mackenzie McDonald (United States) Alex Michelsen	7^{10}	7^{11}
4	(El Salvador) Marcelo Arévalo (Croatia) Mate Pavić	6^{6}	7^{7}	[10]
(Croatia) Ivan Dodig (United Kingdom) Jamie Murray	7^{8}	6^{3}	[5]

Final
WC	(United States) Mackenzie McDonald (United States) Alex Michelsen	2	4
4	(El Salvador) Marcelo Arévalo (Croatia) Mate Pavić	6	6

=== Top half ===
First round
(Monaco) H Nys (Poland) J Zieliński	3	7	[10]
(Argentina) M González (Argentina) A Molteni	6	5	[5]
Alt	(United Kingdom) J Cash (United States) R Galloway	3	7^{7}	[10]
(United Kingdom) N Skupski (New Zealand) M Venus	6	6^{4}	[12]
(United Kingdom) L Glasspool (France) U Humbert	6	3	[5]
6	(Mexico) S González (France) É Roger-Vasselin	3	6	[10]
(Argentina) F Cerúndolo (Argentina) TM Etcheverry	5	6^{2}
(Germany) K Krawietz (Germany) T Pütz	7	7^{7}
WC	(United States) M McDonald (United States) A Michelsen	3	6	[10]
(Denmark) H Rune (Greece) S Tsitsipas	6	3	[5]
WC	(United States) R Cash (United States) J Tracy	6^{5}	3
8	(Australia) M Purcell (Australia) J Thompson	7^{7}	6

Second round
1	(Spain) M Granollers (Argentina) H Zeballos	6^{3}	6	[10]
(Monaco) H Nys (Poland) J Zieliński	7^{7}	4	[6]
(United Kingdom) N Skupski (New Zealand) M Venus	6	2	[10]
6	(Mexico) S González (France) É Roger-Vasselin	3	6	[4]
3	(United States) R Ram (United Kingdom) J Salisbury	7^{7}	7^{7}
(Germany) K Krawietz (Germany) T Pütz	6^{4}	6^{3}
WC	(United States) M McDonald (United States) A Michelsen	w/o
8	(Australia) M Purcell (Australia) J Thompson

Quarterfinals
1	(Spain) M Granollers (Argentina) H Zeballos	6	6
(United Kingdom) N Skupski (New Zealand) M Venus	4	4
3	(United States) R Ram (United Kingdom) J Salisbury	3	7	[9]
WC	(United States) M McDonald (United States) A Michelsen	6	5	[11]

Semifinals
1	(Spain) M Granollers (Argentina) H Zeballos	6^{8}	6^{9}
WC	(United States) M McDonald (United States) A Michelsen	7^{10}	7^{11}

=== Bottom half ===
First round
7	(Finland) H Heliövaara (United Kingdom) H Patten	6	6
WC	(United States) B Nakashima (United States) W Woodall	4	3
Alt	(France) S Doumbia (France) A Mannarino	4	2
(Netherlands) W Koolhof (Croatia) N Mektić	6	6
(Brazil) M Melo (Germany) A Zverev	6	6^{5}	[10]
(United States) N Lammons (United States) J Withrow	4	7^{7}	[2]
5	(Italy) S Bolelli (Italy) A Vavassori	7^{7}	6
(United States) A Krajicek (Netherlands) J-J Rojer	6^{4}	3
K Khachanov; A Rublev	3	6^{4}
(Croatia) I Dodig (United Kingdom) J Murray	6	7^{7}
(Belgium) S Gillé (Belgium) J Vliegen	2	5
(France) A Fils (Chile) N Jarry	6	7

Second round
7	(Finland) H Heliövaara (United Kingdom) H Patten	6^{3}	7^{7}	[10]
(Netherlands) W Koolhof (Croatia) N Mektić	7^{7}	6^{2}	[5]
(Brazil) M Melo (Germany) A Zverev	3	6^{2}
4	(El Salvador) M Arévalo (Croatia) M Pavić	6	7^{7}
5	(Italy) S Bolelli (Italy) A Vavassori	5	6^{4}
(Croatia) I Dodig (United Kingdom) J Murray	7	7^{7}
(France) A Fils (Chile) N Jarry	6	6^{5}	[10]
2	(India) R Bopanna (Australia) M Ebden	4	7^{7}	[8]

Quarterfinals
7	(Finland) H Heliövaara (United Kingdom) H Patten	2	4
4	(El Salvador) M Arévalo (Croatia) M Pavić	6	6
(Croatia) I Dodig (United Kingdom) J Murray	2	7^{7}	[10]
(France) A Fils (Chile) N Jarry	6	6^{5}	[6]

Semifinals
4	(El Salvador) M Arévalo (Croatia) M Pavić	6^{6}	7^{7}	[10]
(Croatia) I Dodig (United Kingdom) J Murray	7^{8}	6^{3}	[5]

== Seeded teams ==
The following are the seeded teams. Seedings are based on ATP rankings as of 5 August 2024.

Country	Player	Country	Player	Rank	Seed
ESP	Marcel Granollers	ARG	Horacio Zeballos	2	1
IND	Rohan Bopanna	AUS	Matthew Ebden	7	2
USA	Rajeev Ram	GBR	Joe Salisbury	11	3
ESA	Marcelo Arévalo	CRO	Mate Pavić	15	4
ITA	Simone Bolelli	ITA	Andrea Vavassori	19	5
MEX	Santiago González	FRA	Édouard Roger-Vasselin	26	6
FIN	Harri Heliövaara	GBR	Henry Patten	27	7
AUS	Max Purcell	AUS	Jordan Thompson	37	8

== Other entry information ==
=== Wildcards ===
- (United States) Robert Cash / (United States) James Tracy
- (United States) Mackenzie McDonald / (United States) Alex Michelsen
- (United States) Brandon Nakashima / (United States) William Woodall

=== Alternates ===
- (United Kingdom) Julian Cash / (United States) Robert Galloway
- (France) Sadio Doumbia / (France) Adrian Mannarino

=== Withdrawals ===
- (France) Sadio Doumbia / (France) Fabien Reboul → replaced by (Argentina) Francisco Cerúndolo / (Argentina) Tomás Martín Etcheverry
- (United States) Sebastian Korda / (United States) Ben Shelton → replaced by (United Kingdom) Julian Cash / (United States) Robert Galloway
- (Czech Republic) Jiří Lehečka / (Norway) Casper Ruud → replaced by (France) Sadio Doumbia / (France) Adrian Mannarino
