= 2024 Cincinnati Open – Women's singles =

Women's singles
- 2024 Cincinnati Open

Final
- Champion: Aryna Sabalenka
- Runner-up: (United States) Jessica Pegula
- Score: 6–3, 7–5

Details
- Draw: 56
- Seeds: 16

Events
Singles	men	women
Doubles	men	women
← 2023 ·	Cincinnati Open	· 2025 →

Aryna Sabalenka defeated Jessica Pegula in the final, 6–3, 7–5 to win the women's singles tennis title at the 2024 Cincinnati Open. She did not lose a set en route to her sixth WTA 1000 title and 15th career WTA Tour singles title. Pegula was attempting to become the first woman to win both the Canadian Open and Cincinnati Open in the same season since Evonne Goolagong Cawley in 1973. The two would play each other three weeks later, in the final of the US Open; Sabalenka would again defeat Pegula in straight sets.

Coco Gauff was the defending champion, but lost in the second round to Yulia Putintseva.

== Seeds ==
The top eight seeds received a bye into the second round.

1. (Poland) Iga Świątek (semifinals)
2. (United States) Coco Gauff (second round)
3. Aryna Sabalenka (champion)
4. (Kazakhstan) Elena Rybakina (second round)
5. (Italy) Jasmine Paolini (third round)
6. (United States) Jessica Pegula (final)
7. (China) Zheng Qinwen (third round)
8. (Latvia) Jeļena Ostapenko (second round)
9. Daria Kasatkina (second round)
10. Liudmila Samsonova (quarterfinals)
11. (United States) Emma Navarro (first round)
12. (Tunisia) Ons Jabeur (withdrew)
13. Anna Kalinskaya (second round)
14. Victoria Azarenka (withdrew)
15. (Ukraine) Marta Kostyuk (third round)
16. (Croatia) Donna Vekić (first round)
17. (Brazil) Beatriz Haddad Maia (first round)

Click on the seed number of a player to go to their draw section.

== Draw ==
=== Key ===
- Q = Qualifier
- WC = Wild card
- LL = Lucky loser
- Alt = Alternate
- ITF = ITF entry
- PR = Protected ranking
- SR = Special ranking
- SE = Special exempt
- JE = Junior exempt
- JR = Junior Accelerator Programme entrant
- CO = College Accelerator Programme entrant
- NG = Next Gen Accelerator Program entrant
- w/o = Walkover
- r = Retired
- d = Defaulted

=== Finals ===
Quarterfinals
1	(Poland) Iga Świątek	4	6	7
Mirra Andreeva	6	3	5
3	Aryna Sabalenka	6	6
10	Liudmila Samsonova	3	2
6	(United States) Jessica Pegula	7	6^{1}	7^{7}
(Canada) Leylah Fernandez	5	7^{7}	6^{3}
Anastasia Pavlyuchenkova	3	2
PR	(Spain) Paula Badosa	6	6

Semifinals
1	(Poland) Iga Świątek	3	3
3	Aryna Sabalenka	6	6
6	(United States) Jessica Pegula	6	3	6
PR	(Spain) Paula Badosa	2	6	3

Final
3	Aryna Sabalenka	6	7
6	(United States) Jessica Pegula	3	5

=== Top half ===
==== Section 1 ====
First round
PR	(Australia) A Tomljanović	3	6	6^{5}
Q	(France) V Gracheva	6	2	7^{7}
Q	(New Zealand) L Sun	6	7^{7}
(Czech Republic) L Nosková	4	6^{4}
(Belgium) E Mertens	4	6	4
15	(Ukraine) M Kostyuk	6	2	6
11	(United States) E Navarro	2	2
M Andreeva	6	6
(Czech Republic) Ka Plíšková	7^{7}	7^{7}
(Bulgaria) V Tomova	6^{3}	6^{3}
A Potapova	6	2	6
(France) C Burel	4	6	1

Second round
1	(Poland) I Świątek	6	6^{8}	6
Q	(France) V Gracheva	0	7^{10}	2
Q	(New Zealand) L Sun	3	5
15	(Ukraine) M Kostyuk	6	7
M Andreeva	6	6
(Czech Republic) Ka Plíšková	2	3
A Potapova	6^{2}	3
5	(Italy) J Paolini	7^{7}	6

Third round
1	(Poland) I Świątek	6	6
15	(Ukraine) M Kostyuk	2	2
M Andreeva	3	6	6
5	(Italy) J Paolini	6	3	2

Quarterfinals
1	(Poland) I Świątek	4	6	7
M Andreeva	6	3	5

==== Section 2 ====
First round
Q	(United States) R Montgomery	5	6	3
(Italy) E Cocciaretto	7	4	6
(Ukraine) E Svitolina	5	6	6
Q	(China) Y Wang	7	3	2
LL	(Italy) L Bronzetti	4	6	6^{1}
LL	(Spain) J Bouzas Maneiro	6	3	7^{7}
10	L Samsonova	6	6
(China) Xin Wang	4	4
(United Kingdom) K Boulter	6	0	5
(Poland) M Linette	2	6	7
LL	(Armenia) E Avanesyan	6	7
WC	(Canada) B Andreescu	4	5

Second round
3	A Sabalenka	6	6
(Italy) E Cocciaretto	3	4
(Ukraine) E Svitolina	6	6
LL	(Spain) J Bouzas Maneiro	4	1
10	L Samsonova	7^{12}	6
(Poland) M Linette	6^{10}	1
LL	(Armenia) E Avanesyan	2	6	6
8	(Latvia) J Ostapenko	6	2	2

Third round
3	A Sabalenka	7	6
(Ukraine) E Svitolina	5	2
10	L Samsonova	4	6	6
LL	(Armenia) E Avanesyan	6	0	3

Quarterfinals
3	A Sabalenka	6	6
10	L Samsonova	3	2

=== Bottom half ===
==== Section 3 ====
First round
(Czech Republic) K Muchová	7^{8}	6
(Ukraine) D Yastremska	6^{6}	2
WC	(United States) C Dolehide	6	4	6^{7}
Q	(United States) T Townsend	3	6	7^{9}
E Alexandrova	4	2
9	D Kasatkina	6	6
16	(Croatia) D Vekić	7	6^{4}	2
Q	(United States) A Krueger	5	7^{7}	6
D Shnaider	6	6
PR	(China) S Zhang	1	4
(Canada) L Fernandez	3	6	6
(China) Y Yuan	6	4	3

Second round
6	(United States) J Pegula	5	6	6
(Czech Republic) K Muchová	7	4	2
Q	(United States) T Townsend	6	2	6
9	D Kasatkina	1	6	1
Q	(United States) A Krueger	5	0
D Shnaider	7	6
(Canada) L Fernandez	3	7^{7}	6
4	(Kazakhstan) E Rybakina	6	6^{3}	4

Third round
6	(United States) J Pegula	6	6
Q	(United States) T Townsend	2	3
D Shnaider	1	4
(Canada) L Fernandez	6	6

Quarterfinals
6	(United States) J Pegula	7	6^{1}	7^{7}
(Canada) L Fernandez	5	7^{7}	6^{3}

==== Section 4 ====
First round
(Czech Republic) M Bouzková	6	4	3
Q	(Poland) M Fręch	3	6	6
WC	(Denmark) C Wozniacki	6	6
(Ukraine) A Kalinina	2	4
A Pavlyuchenkova	4	7^{7}	6
17	(Brazil) B Haddad Maia	6	6^{4}	3
13	A Kalinskaya	1	6	6
(Czech Republic) K Siniaková	6	2	3
WC	(United States) P Stearns	2	5
PR	(Spain) P Badosa	6	7
Q	(United Kingdom) H Dart	6	0	1
(Kazakhstan) Y Putintseva	4	6	6

Second round
7	(China) Q Zheng	6	7
Q	(Poland) M Fręch	1	5
WC	(Denmark) C Wozniacki	5	4
A Pavlyuchenkova	7	6
13	A Kalinskaya	3	2
PR	(Spain) P Badosa	6	6
(Kazakhstan) Y Putintseva	6	2	6
2	(United States) C Gauff	4	6	4

Third round
7	(China) Q Zheng	5	1
A Pavlyuchenkova	7	6
PR	(Spain) P Badosa	6	6
(Kazakhstan) Y Putintseva	4	4

Quarterfinals
A Pavlyuchenkova	3	2
PR	(Spain) P Badosa	6	6

== Seeded players ==
The following are the seeded players. Seedings are based on WTA rankings as of 5 August 2024. Rankings and points before are as of 12 August 2024.

Under the 2024 WTA Rulebook, points from all combined ATP/WTA 1000 tournaments (which include Cincinnati) are required to be counted in a player's ranking.

Seed	Rank	Player	Points before	Points defending	Points earned	Points after	Status
1	1	(Poland) Iga Świątek	10,655	350	390	10,695	Semifinals lost to Aryna Sabalenka [3]
2	2	(United States) Coco Gauff	7,633	900	10	6,743	Second round lost to (Kazakhstan) Yulia Putintseva
3	3	Aryna Sabalenka	7,366	350	1,000	8,016	Champion, defeated (United States) Jessica Pegula [6]
4	4	(Kazakhstan) Elena Rybakina	6,026	105	10	5,931	Second round lost to (Canada) Leylah Fernandez
5	5	(Italy) Jasmine Paolini	5,268	220	120	5,168	Third round lost to Mirra Andreeva
6	6	(United States) Jessica Pegula	4,615	105	650	5,160	Runner-up, lost to Aryna Sabalenka [3]
7	7	(China) Zheng Qinwen	3,965	105	120	3,980	Third round lost to Anastasia Pavlyuchenkova
8	11	(Latvia) Jeļena Ostapenko	3,478	60	10	3,428	Second round lost to (Armenia) Elina Avanesyan [LL]
9	12	Daria Kasatkina	3,103	105	65	3,063	Second round lost to (United States) Taylor Townsend [Q]
10	17	Liudmila Samsonova	2,450	(55)^{†}	215	2,610	Quarterfinals lost to Aryna Sabalenka [3]
11	13	(United States) Emma Navarro	3,038	(98)^{†}	10	2,950	First round lost to Mirra Andreeva
12	16	(Tunisia) Ons Jabeur	2,641	190	0	2,451	Withdrew due to shoulder injury
13	15	Anna Kalinskaya	2,660	(13)^{‡}	65	2,712	Second round lost to (Spain) Paula Badosa [PR]
14	19	Victoria Azarenka	2,326	60	0	2,266	Withdrew due to injury
15	21	(Ukraine) Marta Kostyuk	2,260	(32)^{†}	120	2,348	Third round lost to (Poland) Iga Świątek [1]
16	23	(Croatia) Donna Vekić	2,108	105	10	2,013	First round lost to (United States) Ashlyn Krueger [Q]
17	22	(Brazil) Beatriz Haddad Maia	2,113	(30)^{†}	10	2,093	First round lost to Anastasia Pavlyuchenkova

† The player's 2023 points did not count towards her ranking on 12 August 2024 because the 2023 tournament was non-mandatory. Points from her 18th best result will be deducted instead.
‡ The player did not qualify for the tournament in 2023. Points from her 18th best result will be deducted instead.

=== Withdrawn players ===
The following players would have been seeded, but withdrew before the tournament began.

Rank	Player	Points before	Points defending	Points after	Withdrawal reason
8	(Greece) Maria Sakkari	3,620	105	3,515	Shoulder injury
9	(Czech Republic) Barbora Krejčiková	3,572	1	3,571	Thigh injury
10	(United States) Danielle Collins	3,482	60	3,422	Abdominal injury
14	(United States) Madison Keys	2,728	1	2,727	Thigh injury

== Other entry information ==
=== Wildcards ===
- (Canada) Bianca Andreescu
- (United States) Caroline Dolehide
- (United States) Peyton Stearns
- (Denmark) Caroline Wozniacki

=== Protected ranking ===
- (Spain) Paula Badosa
- (Australia) Ajla Tomljanović
- (China) Zhang Shuai

=== Special exempt ===
- ~~(United States) Amanda Anisimova~~

=== Withdrawals ===
- § (United States) Amanda Anisimova → replaced by (Italy) Lucia Bronzetti
- § Victoria Azarenka → replaced by (Spain) Jéssica Bouzas Maneiro
- ‡ (Romania) Sorana Cîrstea → replaced by (France) Clara Burel
- ‡ (United States) Danielle Collins → replaced by (Poland) Magda Linette
- ‡ (France) Caroline Garcia → replaced by (Ukraine) Anhelina Kalinina
- § (Tunisia) Ons Jabeur → replaced by (Armenia) Elina Avanesyan
- ‡ (United States) Madison Keys → replaced by (China) Zhang Shuai
- ‡ (Czech Republic) Barbora Krejčíková → replaced by (Czech Republic) Marie Bouzková
- ‡ Veronika Kudermetova → replaced by (Italy) Elisabetta Cocciaretto
- ‡ (Greece) Maria Sakkari → replaced by (Czech Republic) Karolína Plíšková
- ‡ (Czech Republic) Markéta Vondroušová → replaced by (Bulgaria) Viktoriya Tomova

‡ – withdrew from entry list
§ – withdrew from main draw

== Qualifying ==
=== Seeds ===
1. (Poland) Magdalena Fręch (qualified)
2. (China) Wang Xiyu (first round)
3. (New Zealand) Lulu Sun (qualified)
4. (United States) Katie Volynets (qualifying competition)
5. (Armenia) Elina Avanesyan (qualifying competition, lucky loser)
6. (Spain) Cristina Bucșa (first round)
7. (Denmark) Clara Tauson (first round)
8. (Japan) Moyuka Uchijima (first round)
9. (Italy) Lucia Bronzetti (qualifying competition, lucky loser)
10. (France) Varvara Gracheva (qualified)
11. Anna Blinkova (first round)
12. (United States) Taylor Townsend (qualified)
13. (China) Wang Yafan (qualified)
14. (Spain) Jéssica Bouzas Maneiro (qualifying competition, lucky loser)
15. (United Kingdom) Harriet Dart (qualified)
16. (Italy) Martina Trevisan (qualifying competition)

=== Qualifiers ===
1. (Poland) Magdalena Fręch
2. (France) Varvara Gracheva
3. (New Zealand) Lulu Sun
4. (United States) Taylor Townsend
5. (United Kingdom) Harriet Dart
6. (United States) Robin Montgomery
7. (China) Wang Yafan
8. (United States) Ashlyn Krueger

=== Lucky losers ===
1. (Armenia) Elina Avanesyan
2. (Italy) Lucia Bronzetti
3. (Spain) Jéssica Bouzas Maneiro

=== Draw ===
==== First qualifier ====
First round
1	(Poland) Magdalena Fręch	6	2
(United States) Hailey Baptiste	2	1^{r}
(Ukraine) Lesia Tsurenko	2	2
14	(Spain) Jéssica Bouzas Maneiro	6	6

Qualifying competition
1	(Poland) Magdalena Fręch	6	6
14	(Spain) Jéssica Bouzas Maneiro	1	4

==== Second qualifier ====
First round
2	(China) Wang Xiyu	3	6	1
Aliaksandra Sasnovich	6	1	6
(United States) Bernarda Pera	3	1
10	(France) Varvara Gracheva	6	6

Qualifying competition
Aliaksandra Sasnovich	4	3
10	(France) Varvara Gracheva	6	6

==== Third qualifier ====
First round
3	(New Zealand) Lulu Sun	6	6
PR	(United States) Shelby Rogers	3	0
WC	(Canada) Marina Stakusic	3	7^{8}	2
9	(Italy) Lucia Bronzetti	6	6^{6}	6

Qualifying competition
3	(New Zealand) Lulu Sun	7^{7}	6
9	(Italy) Lucia Bronzetti	6^{4}	3

==== Fourth qualifier ====
First round
4	(United States) Katie Volynets	6	7
(Germany) Tamara Korpatsch	2	5
(France) Chloé Paquet	3	4
12	(United States) Taylor Townsend	6	6

Qualifying competition
4	(United States) Katie Volynets	0	3
12	(United States) Taylor Townsend	6	6

==== Fifth qualifier ====
First round
5	(Armenia) Elina Avanesyan	6	6
WC	(United States) Lauren Davis	3	1
Kamilla Rakhimova	4	6	0
15	(United Kingdom) Harriet Dart	6	2	6

Qualifying competition
5	(Armenia) Elina Avanesyan	4	1
15	(United Kingdom) Harriet Dart	6	6

==== Sixth qualifier ====
First round
6	(Spain) Cristina Bucșa	6	4	0
WC	(United States) Robin Montgomery	4	6	6
Alt	(Australia) Arina Rodionova	1	6	6^{2}
16	(Italy) Martina Trevisan	6	4	7^{7}

Qualifying competition
WC	(United States) Robin Montgomery	6	6
16	(Italy) Martina Trevisan	4	4

==== Seventh qualifier ====
First round
7	(Denmark) Clara Tauson	2	2
Erika Andreeva	6	6
(Italy) Sara Errani	3	0
13	(China) Wang Yafan	6	6

Qualifying competition
Erika Andreeva	7^{7}	3	3
13	(China) Wang Yafan	6^{3}	6	6

==== Eighth qualifier ====
First round
8	(Japan) Moyuka Uchijima	2	0
(United States) Ashlyn Krueger	6	6
WC	(Japan) Naomi Osaka	6	2	6
11	Anna Blinkova	2	6	2

Qualifying competition
(United States) Ashlyn Krueger	6	2	6
WC	(Japan) Naomi Osaka	3	6	3
