= 2024 Cincinnati Open – Men's singles =

Tennis championship

Men's singles
- 2024 Cincinnati Open

Final
- Champion: (Italy) Jannik Sinner
- Runner-up: (United States) Frances Tiafoe
- Score: 7–6^{(7–4)}, 6–2

Details
- Draw: 56
- Seeds: 16

Events
Singles	men	women
Doubles	men	women
← 2023 ·	Cincinnati Masters	· 2025 →

Jannik Sinner defeated Frances Tiafoe in the final, 7–6^{(7–4)}, 6–2 to win the men's singles tennis title at the 2024 Cincinnati Open. It was his third Masters 1000 and 15th career ATP Tour title.

Novak Djokovic was the reigning champion, but withdrew before the tournament began.

== Seeds ==
The top eight seeds received a bye into the second round.

1. (Italy) Jannik Sinner (champion)
2. (Spain) Carlos Alcaraz (second round)
3. (Germany) Alexander Zverev (semifinals)
4. Daniil Medvedev (second round)
5. (Poland) Hubert Hurkacz (quarterfinals, retired)
6. Andrey Rublev (quarterfinals)
7. (Norway) Casper Ruud (second round)
8. (Bulgaria) Grigor Dimitrov (second round)

9. (Greece) Stefanos Tsitsipas (second round)
10. (United States) Tommy Paul (first round)
11. (United States) Taylor Fritz (first round)
12. (United States) Ben Shelton (quarterfinals)
13. (France) Ugo Humbert (first round)
14. (Italy) Lorenzo Musetti (second round)
15. (Denmark) Holger Rune (semifinals)
16. (United States) Sebastian Korda (first round)

Click on the seed number of a player to go to their draw section.

== Draw ==
=== Key ===
- Q = Qualifier
- WC = Wild card
- LL = Lucky loser
- Alt = Alternate
- ITF = ITF entry
- PR = Protected ranking
- SR = Special ranking
- SE = Special exempt
- JE = Junior exempt
- JR = Junior Accelerator Programme entrant
- CO = College Accelerator Programme entrant
- NG = Next Gen Accelerator Program entrant
- w/o = Walkover
- r = Retired
- d = Defaulted

=== Finals ===
Quarterfinals
1	(Italy) Jannik Sinner	4	7	6
6	Andrey Rublev	6	5	4
3	(Germany) Alexander Zverev	3	7^{7}	7
12	(United States) Ben Shelton	6	6^{3}	5
5	(Poland) Hubert Hurkacz	3	0^{r}
(United States) Frances Tiafoe	6	0
(United Kingdom) Jack Draper	4	2
15	(Denmark) Holger Rune	6	6

Semifinals
1	(Italy) Jannik Sinner	7^{11}	5	7^{7}
3	(Germany) Alexander Zverev	6^{9}	7	6^{4}
(United States) Frances Tiafoe	4	6	7^{7}
15	(Denmark) Holger Rune	6	1	6^{4}

Final
1	(Italy) Jannik Sinner	7^{7}	6
(United States) Frances Tiafoe	6^{4}	2

=== Top half ===
==== Section 1 ====
First round
Q	(United States) A Michelsen	6	5	6
(Netherlands) T Griekspoor	1	7	2
(United States) M Giron	4	7	6^{6}
(Argentina) S Báez	6	5	7^{8}
(Australia) J Thompson	3	6	7^{7}
13	(France) U Humbert	6	3	6^{4}
11	(United States) T Fritz	4	6	6^{4}
WC	(United States) B Nakashima	6	4	7^{7}
Q	(United States) B Holt	4	1
(France) A Fils	6	6
(China) Z Zhang	6	7^{7}
(France) G Mpetshi Perricard	3	6^{4}

Second round
1	(Italy) J Sinner	6	7
Q	(United States) A Michelsen	4	5
(Argentina) S Báez	2	4
(Australia) J Thompson	6	6
WC	(United States) B Nakashima	7	7^{7}
(France) A Fils	5	6^{3}
(China) Z Zhang	4	3
6	A Rublev	6	6

Third round
1	(Italy) J Sinner	w/o
(Australia) J Thompson
WC	(United States) B Nakashima	6^{5}	1
6	A Rublev	7^{7}	6

Quarterfinals
1	(Italy) J Sinner	4	7	6
6	A Rublev	6	5	4

==== Section 2 ====
First round
K Khachanov	6	6
(Argentina) F Cerúndolo	0	3
WC	(Australia) M Purcell	6	7^{7}
(Czech Republic) T Macháč	4	6^{1}
PR	(Spain) P Carreño Busta	7	6
16	(United States) S Korda	5	1
12	(United States) B Shelton	7^{7}	7^{7}
WC	(United States) R Opelka	6^{3}	6^{3}
(Argentina) TM Etcheverry	6	6^{3}	6
(Italy) M Arnaldi	3	7^{7}	2
(Hungary) F Marozsán	6	7^{7}
Q	(France) C Moutet	4	6^{2}

Second round
3	(Germany) A Zverev	6	6
K Khachanov	3	2
WC	(Australia) M Purcell	3	3
PR	(Spain) P Carreño Busta	6	6
12	(United States) B Shelton	6^{6}	7^{9}	6
(Argentina) TM Etcheverry	7^{8}	6^{7}	3
(Hungary) F Marozsán	4	6	6
8	(Bulgaria) G Dimitrov	6	4	3

Third round
3	(Germany) A Zverev	7	7^{8}
PR	(Spain) P Carreño Busta	5	6^{6}
12	(United States) B Shelton	6	6
(Hungary) F Marozsán	4	3

Quarterfinals
3	(Germany) A Zverev	3	7^{7}	7
12	(United States) B Shelton	6	6^{3}	5

=== Bottom half ===
==== Section 3 ====
First round
Q	(Japan) Y Nishioka	6	7
(Serbia) M Kecmanović	4	5
(Chile) A Tabilo	3	6^{5}
(Italy) L Darderi	6	7^{7}
(Italy) F Cobolli	6	4	7
10	(United States) T Paul	2	6	5
14	(Italy) L Musetti	4	7^{7}	7^{7}
(Chile) N Jarry	6	6^{5}	6^{4}
(Spain) A Davidovich Fokina	3	6^{6}
(United States) F Tiafoe	6	7^{8}
(Czech Republic) J Lehečka	7^{7}	6
(Argentina) M Navone	6^{3}	3

Second round
5	(Poland) H Hurkacz	3	7^{7}	6
Q	(Japan) Y Nishioka	6	6^{4}	1
(Italy) L Darderi	6^{4}	1^{r}
(Italy) F Cobolli	7^{7}	3
14	(Italy) L Musetti	3	2
(United States) F Tiafoe	6	6
(Czech Republic) J Lehečka	7^{7}	6
4	D Medvedev	6^{2}	4

Third round
5	(Poland) H Hurkacz	6	3	6
(Italy) F Cobolli	3	6	1
(United States) F Tiafoe	6	6^{10}	7^{7}
(Czech Republic) J Lehečka	4	7^{12}	6^{5}

Quarterfinals
5	(Poland) H Hurkacz	3	0^{r}
(United States) F Tiafoe	6	0

==== Section 4 ====
First round
(Canada) F Auger-Aliassime	6	6
Q	(United States) A Kovacevic	3	1
(United Kingdom) J Draper	7	3	7^{7}
Q	(Spain) J Munar	5	6	6^{5}
(Germany) J-L Struff	6	4	3
9	(Greece) S Tsitsipas	4	6	6
15	(Denmark) H Rune	2	6	6
WC	(Italy) M Berrettini	6	1	4
(France) A Mannarino	4	6	1
Q	(Portugal) N Borges	6	3	6
(France) G Monfils	7	6
(Australia) A Popyrin	5	3

Second round
7	(Norway) C Ruud	3	1
(Canada) F Auger-Aliassime	6	6
(United Kingdom) J Draper	3	6	7
9	(Greece) S Tsitsipas	6	4	5
15	(Denmark) H Rune	6	7^{10}
Q	(Portugal) N Borges	3	6^{8}
(France) G Monfils	4	7^{7}	6
2	(Spain) C Alcaraz	6	6^{5}	4

Third round
(Canada) F Auger-Aliassime	7	4	4
(United Kingdom) J Draper	5	6	6
15	(Denmark) H Rune	3	6	6
(France) G Monfils	6	3	4

Quarterfinals
(United Kingdom) J Draper	4	2
15	(Denmark) H Rune	6	6

== Seeded players ==
The following are the seeded players. Seedings are based on ATP rankings as of 5 August 2024. Rankings and points before are as of 12 August 2024.

Seed	Rank	Player	Points before	Points defending	Points earned	Points after	Status
1	1	(Italy) Jannik Sinner	8,770	10	1000	9,760	Champion, defeated (United States) Frances Tiafoe
2	3	(Spain) Carlos Alcaraz	7,950	600	10	7,360	Second round lost to (France) Gaël Monfils
3	4	(Germany) Alexander Zverev	6,995	360	400	7,035	Semifinals lost to (Italy) Jannik Sinner [1]
4	5	Daniil Medvedev	6,355	90	10	6,275	Second round lost to (Czech Republic) Jiří Lehečka
5	7	(Poland) Hubert Hurkacz	4,215	360	200	4,055	Quarterfinals retired against (United States) Frances Tiafoe
6	6	Andrey Rublev	4,615	10	200	4,805	Quarterfinals lost to (Italy) Jannik Sinner [1]
7	8	(Norway) Casper Ruud	3,890	(45)^{†}	10	3,855	Second round lost to (Canada) Félix Auger-Aliassime
8	9	(Bulgaria) Grigor Dimitrov	3,690	(45)^{†}	10	3,655	Second round lost to (Hungary) Fábián Marozsán
9	11	(Greece) Stefanos Tsitsipas	3,465	90	50	3,425	Second round lost to (United Kingdom) Jack Draper
10	13	(United States) Tommy Paul	3,065	90	10	2,985	First round lost to (Italy) Flavio Cobolli
11	12	(United States) Taylor Fritz	3,290	180	10	3,120	First round lost to (United States) Brandon Nakashima [WC]
12	14	(United States) Ben Shelton	2,955	45	200	3,110	Quarterfinals lost to (Germany) Alexander Zverev [3]
13	17	(France) Ugo Humbert	2,365	45	10	2,330	First round lost to (Australia) Jordan Thompson
14	18	(Italy) Lorenzo Musetti	2,250	45	50	2,255	Second round lost to (United States) Frances Tiafoe
15	16	(Denmark) Holger Rune	2,390	10	400	2,780	Semifinals lost to (United States) Frances Tiafoe
16	15	(United States) Sebastian Korda	2,625	(50)^{†}	10	2,585	First round lost to (Spain) Pablo Carreño Busta [PR]

† The player's 2023 points were replaced by a better result for purposes of his ranking as of 12 August 2024. Points for his 19th best result will be deducted instead.

=== Withdrawn players ===
The following players would have been seeded, but withdrew before the tournament began.

Rank	Player	Points before	Points defending	Points after	Withdrawal reason
2	(Serbia) Novak Djokovic	8,460	1,000	7,460	Schedule change
10	(Australia) Alex de Minaur	3,480	45	3,435	Hip injury

== Other entry information ==
=== Wildcards ===
- (Italy) Matteo Berrettini
- (United States) Brandon Nakashima
- (United States) Reilly Opelka
- (Australia) Max Purcell

=== Protected ranking ===
- (Spain) Pablo Carreño Busta

=== Withdrawals ===
- (Kazakhstan) Alexander Bublik → replaced by (Hungary) Fábián Marozsán
- (Australia) Alex de Minaur → replaced by (United States) Marcos Giron
- (Serbia) Novak Djokovic → replaced by (France) Giovanni Mpetshi Perricard
- (United Kingdom) Cameron Norrie → replaced by (Serbia) Miomir Kecmanović

== Qualifying ==
=== Seeds ===
1. (Portugal) Nuno Borges (qualified)
2. (Spain) Pedro Martínez (first round)
3. (Japan) Yoshihito Nishioka (qualified)
4. (Serbia) Dušan Lajović (first round)
5. (United States) Alex Michelsen (qualified)
6. (Italy) Lorenzo Sonego (qualifying competition)
7. (Kazakhstan) Alexander Shevchenko (first round)
8. (France) Hugo Gaston (first round)
9. (Argentina) Facundo Díaz Acosta (withdrew)
10. (Czech Republic) Jakub Menšík (first round)
11. (France) Corentin Moutet (qualified)
12. (India) Sumit Nagal (first round)
13. (Spain) Roberto Bautista Agut (first round)
14. (Australia) Rinky Hijikata (qualifying competition)

=== Qualifiers ===
1. (Portugal) Nuno Borges
2. (United States) Aleksandar Kovacevic
3. (Japan) Yoshihito Nishioka
4. (United States) Brandon Holt
5. (United States) Alex Michelsen
6. (Spain) Jaume Munar
7. (France) Corentin Moutet

=== Draw ===
==== First qualifier ====
First round
1	(Portugal) Nuno Borges	5	6	6
WC	(United States) J. J. Wolf	7	3	4
(Australia) Aleksandar Vukic	7^{7}	6
10	(Czech Republic) Jakub Menšík	6^{5}	2

Qualifying competition
1	(Portugal) Nuno Borges	7^{7}	6
(Australia) Aleksandar Vukic	6^{4}	1

==== Second qualifier ====
First round
2	(Spain) Pedro Martínez	6	2	4
(United States) Aleksandar Kovacevic	4	6	6
Alt	(France) Jaimee Floyd Angele	1	1
14	(Australia) Rinky Hijikata	6	6

Qualifying competition
(United States) Aleksandar Kovacevic	6	7^{7}
14	(Australia) Rinky Hijikata	1	6^{5}

==== Third qualifier ====
First round
3	(Japan) Yoshihito Nishioka	6	6
Alt	(Japan) Taro Daniel	3	1
Alt	(France) Arthur Cazaux	6^{0}	6	7
13	(Spain) Roberto Bautista Agut	7^{7}	3	5

Qualifying competition
3	(Japan) Yoshihito Nishioka	6	6
Alt	(France) Arthur Cazaux	4	4

==== Fourth qualifier ====
First round
4	(Serbia) Dušan Lajović	6	3	5
WC	(United States) Brandon Holt	2	6	7
WC	(United States) Zachary Svajda	2	6	6
Alt	Alexey Zakharov	6	4	3

Qualifying competition
WC	(United States) Brandon Holt	6	2	6
WC	(United States) Zachary Svajda	4	6	3

==== Fifth qualifier ====
First round
5	(United States) Alex Michelsen	6	4	6
(Belgium) Zizou Bergs	3	6	4
WC	(United States) Mackenzie McDonald	6	6
12	(India) Sumit Nagal	2	4

Qualifying competition
5	(United States) Alex Michelsen	6	6
WC	(United States) Mackenzie McDonald	3	2

==== Sixth qualifier ====
First round
6	(Italy) Lorenzo Sonego	3	6	6
(Croatia) Borna Ćorić	6	2	3
(Spain) Jaume Munar	7^{7}	6
8/Alt	(France) Hugo Gaston	6^{5}	2

Qualifying competition
6	(Italy) Lorenzo Sonego	3	6	2
(Spain) Jaume Munar	6	3	6

==== Seventh qualifier ====
First round
7	(Kazakhstan) Alexander Shevchenko	2	4
(Hungary) Márton Fucsovics	6	6
(Germany) Daniel Altmaier	1	4
11	(France) Corentin Moutet	6	6

Qualifying competition
(Hungary) Márton Fucsovics	2	6	3
11	(France) Corentin Moutet	6	2	6
