= 2024 Cincinnati Open – Women's doubles =

Women's doubles
- 2024 Cincinnati Open

Final
- Champions: (United States) Asia Muhammad (New Zealand) Erin Routliffe
- Runners-up: (Canada) Leylah Fernandez (Kazakhstan) Yulia Putintseva
- Score: 3–6, 6–1, [10–4]

Details
- Draw: 28 (3 WC )
- Seeds: 8

Events
Singles	men	women
Doubles	men	women
← 2023 ·	Cincinnati Open	· 2025 →

Asia Muhammad and Erin Routliffe defeated Leylah Fernandez and Yulia Putintseva in the final, 3–6, 6–1, [10–4] to win the women's doubles tennis title at the 2024 Cincinnati Masters. They saved a match point en route to the title, in the quarterfinals against Demi Schuurs and Luisa Stefani.

Alycia Parks and Taylor Townsend were the defending champions, but Parks did not participate this year. Townsend partnered Kateřina Siniaková, but they lost to Fernandez and Putintseva in the quarterfinals.

Routliffe retained the WTA No. 1 doubles ranking after Siniaková lost in the quarterfinals.

== Seeds ==
The top four seeds received a bye into the second round.

1. (Czech Republic) Kateřina Siniaková / (United States) Taylor Townsend (quarterfinals)
2. (Chinese Taipei) Hsieh Su-wei / (Belgium) Elise Mertens (second round)
3. (United States) Asia Muhammad / (New Zealand) Erin Routliffe (champions)
4. (Italy) Sara Errani / (Italy) Jasmine Paolini (quarterfinals)
5. (Ukraine) Lyudmyla Kichenok / (Latvia) Jeļena Ostapenko (second round)
6. (United States) Caroline Dolehide / (United States) Desirae Krawczyk (second round, withdrew)
7. (Netherlands) Demi Schuurs / (Brazil) Luisa Stefani (quarterfinals)
8. (United States) Sofia Kenin / (United States) Bethanie Mattek-Sands (first round)

== Draw ==
=== Key ===
- Q = Qualifier
- WC = Wild card
- LL = Lucky loser
- Alt = Alternate
- ITF = ITF entry
- PR = Protected ranking
- SR = Special ranking
- SE = Special exempt
- JE = Junior exempt
- JR = Junior Accelerator Programme entrant
- CO = College Accelerator Programme entrant
- NG = Next Gen Accelerator Program entrant
- w/o = Walkover
- r = Retired
- d = Defaulted

=== Finals ===
Semifinals
(Canada) Leylah Fernandez (Kazakhstan) Yulia Putintseva	6	6
(Czech Republic) Linda Nosková; Diana Shnaider	3	4
3	(United States) Asia Muhammad (New Zealand) Erin Routliffe	7^{7}	6
(United Kingdom) Harriet Dart (Australia) Ellen Perez	6^{5}	3

Final
(Canada) Leylah Fernandez (Kazakhstan) Yulia Putintseva	6	1	[4]
3	(United States) Asia Muhammad (New Zealand) Erin Routliffe	3	6	[10]

=== Top half ===
First round
(China) Xin Wang (China) S Zheng	5	0^{r}
(Spain) C Bucșa (China) Y Xu	7	0
(Canada) L Fernandez (Kazakhstan) Y Putintseva	7^{8}	3	[10]
(Japan) M Kato (Indonesia) A Sutjiadi	6^{6}	6	[4]
(Mexico) G Olmos; A Panova	6	2	[10]
6	(United States) C Dolehide (United States) D Krawczyk	2	6	[12]
(Hungary) T Babos (Ukraine) N Kichenok	6^{5}	6^{6}
E Alexandrova; Y Sizikova	7^{7}	7^{8}
(Kazakhstan) A Danilina; I Khromacheva	6^{5}	4
(Czech Republic) L Nosková; D Shnaider	7^{7}	6
WC	(Poland) M Linette (United States) P Stearns	3	6	[10]
8	(United States) S Kenin (United States) B Mattek-Sands	6	4	[8]

Second round
1	(Czech Republic) K Siniaková (United States) T Townsend	6	6
(Spain) C Bucșa (China) Y Xu	3	4
(Canada) L Fernandez (Kazakhstan) Y Putintseva	w/o
6	(United States) C Dolehide (United States) D Krawczyk
4	(Italy) S Errani (Italy) J Paolini	4	6	[10]
E Alexandrova; Y Sizikova	6	1	[6]
(Czech Republic) L Nosková; D Shnaider	6	7^{8}
WC	(Poland) M Linette (United States) P Stearns	3	6^{6}

Quarterfinals
1	(Czech Republic) K Siniaková (United States) T Townsend	6	1	[6]
(Canada) L Fernandez (Kazakhstan) Y Putintseva	2	6	[10]
4	(Italy) S Errani (Italy) J Paolini	6	4	[7]
(Czech Republic) L Nosková; D Shnaider	3	6	[10]

Semifinals
(Canada) L Fernandez (Kazakhstan) Y Putintseva	6	6
(Czech Republic) L Nosková; D Shnaider	3	4

=== Bottom half ===
First round
7	(Netherlands) D Schuurs (Brazil) L Stefani	6	6
L Samsonova (China) S Zhang	2	4
(China) H Guo (Romania) M Niculescu	1	5
Alt	(China) Xiy Wang (China) Y Yuan	6	7
Alt	(Japan) M Uchijima (China) Y Wang	6	2	[10]
(Japan) S Aoyama (Japan) E Hozumi	2	6	[8]
5	(Ukraine) L Kichenok (Latvia) J Ostapenko	6	6
WC	(United States) L Davis (United States) R Montgomery	3	2
(Slovakia) T Mihalíková (United Kingdom) O Nicholls	6	6
M Andreeva; A Pavlyuchenkova	4	3
(United Kingdom) H Dart (Australia) E Perez	6	6
(China) X Jiang (Japan) M Ninomiya	4	4

Second round
7	(Netherlands) D Schuurs (Brazil) L Stefani	3	7	[10]
Alt	(China) Xiy Wang (China) Y Yuan	6	5	[1]
Alt	(Japan) M Uchijima (China) Y Wang	6^{2}	6^{4}
3	(United States) A Muhammad (New Zealand) E Routliffe	7^{7}	7^{7}
5	(Ukraine) L Kichenok (Latvia) J Ostapenko	4	5
(Slovakia) T Mihalíková (United Kingdom) O Nicholls	6	7
(United Kingdom) H Dart (Australia) E Perez	6	7
2	(Chinese Taipei) S-w Hsieh (Belgium) E Mertens	3	5

Quarterfinals
7	(Netherlands) D Schuurs (Brazil) L Stefani	6	5	[7]
3	(United States) A Muhammad (New Zealand) E Routliffe	2	7	[10]
(Slovakia) T Mihalíková (United Kingdom) O Nicholls	1	5
(United Kingdom) H Dart (Australia) E Perez	6	7

Semifinals
3	(United States) A Muhammad (New Zealand) E Routliffe	7^{7}	6
(United Kingdom) H Dart (Australia) E Perez	6^{5}	3

== Seeded teams ==
The following are the seeded teams. Seedings are based on WTA rankings as of 5 August 2024.

Country	Player	Country	Player	Rank^{1}	Seed
CZE	Kateřina Siniaková	USA	Taylor Townsend	9	1
TPE	Hsieh Su-wei	BEL	Elise Mertens	9	2
USA	Asia Muhammad	NZL	Erin Routliffe	27	3
ITA	Sara Errani	ITA	Jasmine Paolini	31	4
UKR	Lyudmyla Kichenok	LAT	Jeļena Ostapenko	31	5
USA	Caroline Dolehide	USA	Desirae Krawczyk	32	6
NED	Demi Schuurs	BRA	Luisa Stefani	40	7
USA	Sofia Kenin	USA	Bethanie Mattek-Sands	61	8

== Other entry information ==
=== Wild cards ===
- (United States) Lauren Davis / (United States) Robin Montgomery
- (Poland) Magda Linette / (United States) Peyton Stearns

=== Alternates ===
- (Japan) Moyuka Uchijima / (China) Wang Yafan
- (China) Wang Xiyu / (China) Yuan Yue

=== Withdrawals ===
- (Norway) Ulrikke Eikeri / (United States) Ashlyn Krueger → replaced by (Japan) Moyuka Uchijima / (China) Wang Yafan
- (New Zealand) Lulu Sun / (Australia) Ajla Tomljanović → replaced by (China) Wang Xiyu / (China) Yuan Yue
