= 2024 Cincinnati Open =

- Date: 12–19 August
- Edition: 123rd (men) / 96th (women)
- Category: ATP Tour Masters 1000 (men); WTA 1000 (women)
- Surface: Hard
- Location: Mason, Ohio, U.S.
- Venue: Lindner Family Tennis Center

Champions

Men's singles
- (Italy) Jannik Sinner

Women's singles
- Aryna Sabalenka

Men's doubles
- (El Salvador) Marcelo Arévalo / (Croatia) Mate Pavić

Women's doubles
- (United States) Asia Muhammad / (New Zealand) Erin Routliffe
← 2023 ·	Cincinnati Open	· 2025 →

The 2024 Cincinnati Open was a combined men's and women's tennis tournament played on outdoor hardcourts from 12 to 19 August 2024. It was classified as a Masters 1000 tournament on the 2024 ATP Tour and a WTA 1000 tournament on the 2024 WTA Tour. The 2024 tournament was the 123rd men's edition and the 96th women's edition of the Cincinnati Open. It took place at the Lindner Family Tennis Center in Mason, Ohio, a northern suburb of Cincinnati, in the United States.

== Points and prize money ==
=== Points distribution ===
Event	W	F	SF	QF	Round of 16	Round of 32	Round of 64	Q	Q2	Q1
Men's Singles	1,000	650	400	200	100	50	10	30	16	0
Men's Doubles	1,000	600	360	180	90	0	—	—	—	—
Women's singles	1,000	650	390	215	120	65	10	30	20	2
Women's doubles	1,000	650	390	215	120	10	—	—	—	—

=== Prize money ===
Event	W	F	SF	QF	Round of 16	Round of 32	Round of 64	Q2	Q1
Men's singles	$1,049,460	$573,090	$313,395	$170,940	$91,435	$49,030	$27,165	$13,915	$7,290
Women's singles	$523,485	$308,320	$158,944	$72,965	$36,454	$20,650	$14,800	$8,800	$4,610
Men's doubles*	$322,000	$174,920	$96,090	$53,010	$29,140	$15,910	—	—	—
Women's doubles*	$154,160	$86,710	$46,570	$24,090	$13,650	$9,100	—	—	—

_{*per team}

== Champions ==
=== Men's singles ===
- (Italy) Jannik Sinner def. (United States) Frances Tiafoe 7–6^{(7–4)}, 6–2

=== Women's singles ===
- Aryna Sabalenka def. (United States) Jessica Pegula, 6–3, 7–5

=== Men's doubles ===
- (El Salvador) Marcelo Arévalo / (Croatia) Mate Pavić def. (United States) Mackenzie McDonald / (United States) Alex Michelsen, 6–2, 6–4

=== Women's doubles ===
- (United States) Asia Muhammad / (New Zealand) Erin Routliffe def. (Canada) Leylah Fernandez / (Kazakhstan) Yulia Putintseva 3–6, 6–1, [10–4]
