= Alex Michelsen =

American tennis player (born 2004)

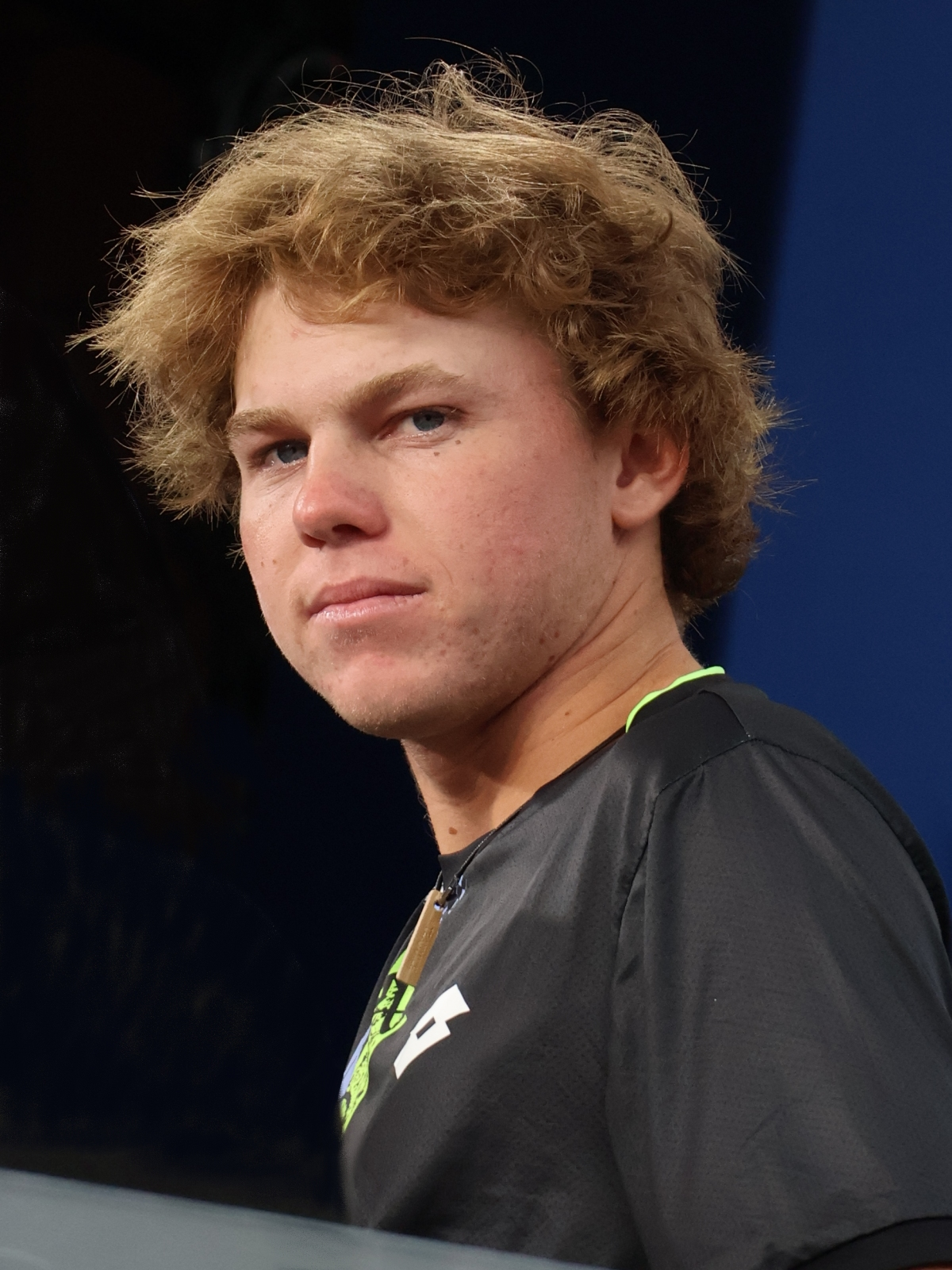
- Michelsen at the 2023 US Open
- Country (sports): United States
- Born: August 25, 2004 (age 22) Aliso Viejo, California, US
- Height: 6 ft 4 in (1.93 m)
- Turned pro: 2023
- Plays: Right-handed (two-handed backhand)
- Coach: Kristof Vliegen (2025-); Craig Boynton (Aug-Oct 2025), Robby Ginepri (Sep 2024-2025)
- Prize money: US $6,251,701

Singles
- Career record: 89–82
- Career titles: 0
- Highest ranking: No. 30 (July 14, 2025)
- Current ranking: No. 35 (November 9, 2026)

Grand Slam singles results
- Australian Open: 4R (2025)
- French Open: 3R (2026)
- Wimbledon: 1R (2024, 2025, 2026)
- US Open: QF (2026)

Doubles
- Career record: 21–30
- Career titles: 0
- Highest ranking: No. 67 (June 30, 2025)
- Current ranking: No. 126 (August 31, 2026)

Grand Slam doubles results
- Wimbledon: 1R (2024, 2025)
- US Open: 1R (2022, 2024)

Grand Slam mixed doubles results
- US Open: 2R (2023)
- Last updated on: September 6, 2026.

Alex T. Michelsen (born August 25, 2004) is an American professional tennis player from California. He has a career-high ATP singles ranking of world No. 30 achieved on July 14, 2025 and a best doubles ranking of No. 67 reached on June 30, 2025.

Michelsen's parents, Sondra and Erik Michelsen, both played tennis in college.

== Junior career ==
He was a runner-up on boys' doubles category at the 2022 Australian Open, partnering with Daniel Vallejo. Later that season, he also won the singles and doubles titles at the prestigious Easter Bowl, becoming the first American champion in both disciplines since Donald Young in 2006.

In July, Michelsen won the boys' doubles title at 2022 Wimbledon Championships, with compatriot Sebastian Gorzny.

Michelsen had good results on the ITF junior circuit, maintaining a 36–14 singles win-loss record and reached an ITF junior combined ranking of No. 25 on 11 July 2022.

Michelsen was committed to play college tennis at the University of Georgia, but then decided to turn pro.

== Professional career ==
=== 2022: US Open doubles debut, First ITF titles ===
In August 2022, Michelsen reached his first ITF tour final in doubles at the M15 Memphis, teaming with Cooper Williams. He then made his Grand Slam doubles debut at the US Open playing alongside Sebastian Gorzny, losing in the first round.

In November 2022, Michelsen won his first titles on the ITF Tour in East Lansing. He swept the event, defeating Alexander Kotzen in the singles final, and partnering with Learner Tien to win the doubles event.

=== 2023: Major, ATP Tour & top 100 debuts, ATP final ===
In February, Michelsen reached his first Challenger final in Rome, USA, losing to Jordan Thompson. In March, Michelsen received a qualifying wildcard for the Indian Wells Open.

In June, he made his ATP debut at the 2023 Mallorca Championships as a lucky loser, losing in the first round to eventual champion Christopher Eubanks. In July, Michelsen won his first Challenger title in Chicago, defeating Yuta Shimizu in the finals. Later that month, he reached his first final on the ATP Tour at the 2023 Hall of Fame Open in Newport, where he lost to second seed Adrian Mannarino. With this run, he tied John Isner as the fastest American man to reach an ATP Tour level final, doing so in just his second ATP tournament, and at 18 years 10 months, became the youngest American man to reach a final since Taylor Fritz.

Michelsen turned professional two weeks later, foregoing his college eligibility and in August, he made his debut at a Major when he received a wildcard into the men's singles event at the US Open. He defeated Albert Ramos Viñolas in straight sets to progress to the second round where he lost to 23rd seed Nicolás Jarry. As a result, he reached a new career high of No. 117 on 11 September 2023. At the same tournament, he also enters the mixed doubles competition with Robin Montgomery and reached the second round on his debut.

Next he reached the semifinals at the 2023 Cary Challenger II but lost to eventual champion Zachary Svajda. He won his second Challenger in Knoxville and made his top 100 debut. In November, he qualified for the 2023 Next Generation ATP Finals.

=== 2024: Major third round, Masters debut and first wins, top 50 ===
He reached the third round at the 2024 Australian Open defeating wildcard James McCabe and 32nd seed Jiří Lehečka on his debut at this major. As a result, he reached the top 75 in the singles rankings.

At the 2024 Dallas Open, he defeated qualifier Tennys Sandgren but lost to top seed Frances Tiafoe. The following week at the 2024 Delray Beach Open, he defeated Thanasi Kokkinakis in straight sets. He lost to Dallas champion Tommy Paul in a tight match with a third set tiebreak. At the next tournament, the 2024 Los Cabos Open, in the following week, he entered as an alternate and defeated another alternate player Constant Lestienne. He recorded the biggest win and first top 10 win of his career, defeating newly arrived top 10 player and the fourth seed, previous year runner-up Alex de Minaur in straight sets, losing only five games, to reach the quarterfinals. He lost to eventual champion Jordan Thompson after winning the first set 6-0 and having three match points.

At the 2024 BNP Paribas Open, he recorded his first Masters win over Jaume Munar on his debut. At the age of 19, he became the youngest American player to win a match at this level since Taylor Fritz and Frances Tiafoe were both winners at that same age in Miami in 2017. He lost again to fellow American, 17th seed Tommy Paul. He also made his debut at the 2024 Miami Open and recorded his first win over qualifier Lukáš Klein in straight sets.

He recorded his first ATP clay court win at the 2024 BMW Open in Munich with a win over wildcard Max Hans Rehberg. He reached the top 65 on 20 May 2024, following his first round losses at the 2024 Mutua Madrid Open and at the Italian Open and a second round loss at the Challenger 2024 Open de Oeiras II. A week later he entered the top 60 after reaching his first ATP clay court quarterfinal with a win over third seed and compatriot Taylor Fritz at the 2024 Geneva Open, his second top 15 win.

With his first grass court win of the season over Nuno Borges in Mallorca, he became the youngest player to win a match at the tournament. As a result, he reached the top 55 in the singles rankings. Michelsen reached a consecutive final at the 2024 Hall of Fame Open, defeating Reilly Opelka in the semifinals before losing to Marcos Giron.

At the 2024 Cincinnati Open, he reached the second round and improved his career-high to world No. 52, on 19 August 2024. In doubles, at the same tournament, he reached his first ATP and Masters 1000 doubles final as a wildcard pair, partnering Mackenzie McDonald, with a win over world No. 1 pair of Marcel Granollers and Horacio Zeballos. At the next North American swing tournament, the 2024 Winston-Salem Open, he reached the semifinals defeating Márton Fucsovics, Zizou Bergs, and Christopher Eubanks. By making his second final of the season, after the retirement of wildcard Pablo Carreño Busta, he reached the top 50 on 26 August 2024. At the US Open, he recorded his second win at this Major defeating qualifier and compatriot Eliot Spizzirri. He qualified for the main draw of the 2024 Japan Open Tennis Championships and upset fourth seed Stefanos Tsitsipas, his second top 20 win of his career and then fellow qualifier Christopher O'Connell to reach the quarterfinals.

=== 2025: Major 4th round, Masters quarterfinals, top 30 ===
At the 2025 Australian Open, Alex Michelsen faced again 11-seed Stefanos Tsitsipas and won in four sets to secure his first top 15 win in a major. Next he defeated local wildcard James McCabe and 19th seed Karen Khachanov to reach a Grand Slam fourth round for the first time in his career.

At the 2025 BNP Paribas Open, where he was seeded for the first time at a Masters 1000, he reached the third round at that level for the first time, defeating qualifier Colton Smith but retired in his next match against Daniil Medvedev. In Miami, he lost in the second round, having had a bye in the first.

Michelsen reached the top 30 on 14 July 2025, following Wimbledon. Ranked No. 34 at the 2025 National Bank Open, he reached a Masters 1000 fourth round for the first time in his career upsetting world No. 10 and third seed Lorenzo Musetti. Next he defeated good friend Learner Tien in straight sets to reach his first Masters 1000 quarterfinal, becoming the youngest American player at 20 years and 336 days, to accomplish the feat at the Canada Masters since Andy Roddick (at 18 years 334 days) in 2001.

== Performance timelines ==
Key
W	F	SF	QF	#R	RR	Q#	DNQ	A	NH

(W) winner; (F) finalist; (SF) semifinalist; (QF) quarterfinalist; (#R) rounds 4, 3, 2, 1; (RR) round-robin stage; (Q#) qualification round; (DNQ) did not qualify; (A) absent; (NH) not held; (SR) strike rate (events won / competed); (W–L) win–loss record.
To avoid confusion and double counting, these charts are updated at the conclusion of a tournament or when the player's participation has ended.

=== Singles ===
Tournament	2023	2024	2025	2026	SR	W–L	Win %
Grand Slam tournaments
Australian Open	A	3R	4R	1R	0 / 3	5–3	63%
French Open	A	1R	1R	3R	0 / 3	2–3	40%
Wimbledon	A	1R	1R	1R	0 / 3	0–3	0%
US Open	2R	2R	1R	QF	0 / 4	6–4	60%
Win–loss	1–1	3–4	3–4	6–4	0 / 13	13–13	50%
ATP 1000 tournaments
Indian Wells Open	Q1	2R	3R	4R	0 / 3	5–3	63%
Miami Open	A	2R	2R	4R	0 / 3	4–3	57%
Monte-Carlo Masters	A	Q1	A	A	0 / 0	0–0	–
Madrid Open	A	1R	1R	3R	0 / 3	1–3	25%
Italian Open	A	1R	2R	1R	0 / 3	0–3	0%
Canadian Open	A	1R	QF	3R	0 / 3	5–3	63%
Cincinnati Open	A	2R	3R	2R	0 / 3	3–3	50%
Shanghai Masters	A	2R	2R	2R	0 / 3	1–3	25%
Paris Masters	A	2R	1R	2R	0 / 3	2–3	40%
Win–loss	0–0	5–8	5–8	11–8	0 / 24	21–24	47%
Career statistics
Tournaments	5	29	26	16	Career total: 76		
Titles	0	0	0	0	Career total: 0		
Finals	1	2	0	0	Career total: 3		
Overall win–loss	7–8	34–30	25–27	22–16	0 / 76	88–81	52%
Year-end ranking	97	42	38		$4,403,590		

== ATP 1000 finals ==
=== Doubles: 2 (2 runner-ups) ===
Result	Year	Tournament	Surface	Partner	Opponents	Score
Loss	2024	Cincinnati Open	Hard	(United States) Mackenzie McDonald	(El Salvador) Marcelo Arévalo (Croatia) Mate Pavić	2–6, 4–6
Loss	2025	Shanghai Masters	Hard	(Sweden) André Göransson	(Germany) Kevin Krawietz (Germany) Tim Pütz	4–6, 4–6

== ATP Tour finals ==
=== Singles: 3 (3 runner-ups) ===
Legend Grand Slam (–) ATP 1000 (–) ATP 500 (–) ATP 250 (0–3)	Finals by surface Hard (0–1) Clay (–) Grass (0–2)	Finals by setting Outdoor (0–3) Indoor (–)

Result	W–L	Date	Tournament	Tier	Surface	Opponent	Score
Loss	0–1	Jul 2023	Hall of Fame Open, US	ATP 250	Grass	(France) Adrian Mannarino	2–6, 4–6
Loss	0–2	Jul 2024	Hall of Fame Open, US	ATP 250	Grass	(United States) Marcos Giron	7–6^{(7–4)}, 3–6, 5–7
Loss	0–3	Aug 2024	Winston-Salem Open, US	ATP 250	Hard	(Italy) Lorenzo Sonego	0–6, 3–6

=== Doubles: 3 (3 runner-ups) ===
Legend Grand Slam (–) ATP 1000 (0–2) ATP 500 (–) ATP 250 (0–1)	Finals by surface Hard (0–2) Clay (–) Grass (0–1)	Finals by setting Outdoor (0–3) Indoor (–)

Result	W–L	Date	Tournament	Tier	Surface	Partner	Opponents	Score
Loss	0–1	Aug 2024	Cincinnati Open, US	ATP 1000	Hard	(United States) Mackenzie McDonald	(El Salvador) Marcelo Arévalo (Croatia) Mate Pavić	2–6, 4–6
Loss	0–2	Jun 2025	Stuttgart Open, Germany	ATP 250	Grass	(United States) Rajeev Ram	(Mexico) Santiago González (United States) Austin Krajicek	4–6, 4–6
Loss	0–3	Sep 2025	Shanghai Masters, China	ATP 1000	Hard	(Sweden) André Göransson	(Germany) Kevin Krawietz (Germany) Tim Pütz	4–6, 4–6

== ATP Challenger and ITF Tour finals ==
=== Singles: 11 (6 titles, 5 runner-ups) ===
Legend ATP Challenger Tour (4–2) ITF WTT (2–3)	Finals by surface Hard (5–5) Clay (1–0)

Result	W–L	Date	Tournament	Tier	Surface	Opponent	Score
Loss	0–1	Feb 2023	Georgia's Rome Challenger, US	Challenger	Hard (i)	(Australia) Jordan Thompson	4–6, 2–6
Win	1–1	Jul 2023	Chicago Men's Challenger, US	Challenger	Hard	(Japan) Yuta Shimizu	7–5, 6–2
Win	2–1	Nov 2023	Knoxville Challenger, US	Challenger	Hard (i)	(United States) Denis Kudla	7–5, 4–6, 6–2
Loss	2–2	Nov 2023	Champaign Challenger, US	Challenger	Hard (i)	(United States) Patrick Kypson	4–6, 3–6
Win	3–2	Apr 2025	Estoril Open, Portugal	Challenger	Clay	(Italy) Andrea Pellegrino	6–4, 6–4
Win	4–2	Jul 2026	Cranbrook Tennis Classic, US	Challenger	Hard	(United Kingdom) Jacob Fearnley	7–6^{(7–4)}, 6–3

Result	W–L	Date	Tournament	Tier	Surface	Opponent	Score
Loss	0–1	Oct 2022	M15 Winston-Salem, US	WTT	Hard (i)	(United Kingdom) Toby Samuel	1–6, 5–7
Win	1–1	Nov 2022	M15 East Lansing, US	WTT	Hard (i)	(United States) Alexander Kotzen	7–6^{(7–2)}, 6–1
Loss	1–2	Jan 2023	M25 Malibu, US	WTT	Hard	(United Kingdom) Arthur Fery	4–6, 6–2, 4–6
Win	2–2	Jan 2023	M15 Edmond, US	WTT	Hard (i)	(Sweden) Lucas Renard	6–7^{(5–7)}, 7–6^{(7–4)}, 6–1
Loss	2–3	Mar 2023	M25 Calabasas, US	WTT	Hard	(United States) Nathan Ponwith	3–6, 7–6^{(7–5)}, 5–7

=== Doubles: 2 (1 title, 1 runner-up) ===
Legend ATP Challenger Tour (–) ITF WTT (1–1)

Result	W–L	Date	Tournament	Tier	Surface	Partner	Opponents	Score
Loss	0–1	Aug 2022	M15 Memphis, US	WTT	Hard	(United States) Cooper Williams	(United Kingdom) Millen Hurrion (New Zealand) Finn Reynolds	0–6, 1–6
Win	1–1	Nov 2022	M15 East Lansing, US	WTT	Hard (i)	(United States) Learner Tien	(United Kingdom) Joshua Goodger (United Kingdom) Emile Hudd	6–4, 6–3

== Wins over top 10 players ==
- Michelsen has a 3–8 (27.27%) record against players who were, at the time the match was played, ranked in the top 10.

Season	2024	2025	2026	Total
Wins	1	1	1	3

#	Player	Rk	Event	Surface	Rd	Score	Rk	Ref
2024
1.	(Australia) Alex de Minaur	9	Los Cabos Open, Mexico	Hard	2R	6–4, 6–1	74	
2025
2.	(Italy) Lorenzo Musetti	10	Canadian Open, Canada	Hard	3R	3–6, 7–6^{(7–4)}, 6–4	34	
2026
3.	(United States) Taylor Fritz	7	Indian Wells Open, United States	Hard	3R	6–4, 7–6^{(8–6)}	44	

*As of 9 March 2026

== Exhibition matches ==
=== Doubles ===
Result	Date	Tournament	Surface	Partner	Opponents	Score
Loss	Aug 2025	Stars of the Open, US Open Fan Week, New York, US	Hard	(United States) Andy Roddick	(Argentina) Juan Martín del Potro (Brazil) João Fonseca	9–11

== Junior Grand Slam finals ==
=== Doubles: 2 (1 title, 1 runner-up) ===
Result	Year	Tournament	Surface	Partner	Opponents	Score
Loss	2022	Australian Open	Hard	(Paraguay) Daniel Vallejo	(United States) Bruno Kuzuhara (Hong Kong) Coleman Wong	3–6, 6–7^{(3–7)}
Win	2022	Wimbledon	Grass	(United States) Sebastian Gorzny	(France) Gabriel Debru (France) Paul Inchauspé	7–6^{(7–5)}, 6–3

== Equipment ==
Michelsen's equipment of choice includes the Babolat Pure Aero racket, complemented by RPM Blast strings.
