= Georgia's Rome Challenger =

- 2023 Coosa Valley Open

ATP Challenger Tour
- Event name: Georgia's Rome Challenger
- Location: Rome, Georgia, United States
- Category: ATP Challenger Tour
- Surface: Hard (indoor)

The Georgia's Rome Challenger is a professional tennis tournament played on indoor hard courts. It is currently part of the Association of Tennis Professionals (ATP) Challenger Tour. It has been held in Rome, Georgia, United States since 2022.

== Past finals ==
=== Singles ===
| Year | Champion | Runner-up | Score |
|---|---|---|---|
| 2023 | (Australia) Jordan Thompson | (United States) Alex Michelsen | 6–4, 6–2 |
| 2022 | (China) Wu Yibing | (United States) Ben Shelton | 7–5, 6–3 |

=== Doubles ===
| Year | Champions | Runners-up | Score |
|---|---|---|---|
| 2023 | (United Kingdom) Luke Johnson (Netherlands) Sem Verbeek | (Brazil) Gabriel Décamps (United States) Alex Rybakov | 6–2, 6–2 |
| 2022 | (France) Enzo Couacaud (Australia) Andrew Harris | (Philippines) Ruben Gonzales (United States) Reese Stalder | 6–4, 6–2 |
