= 2024 Córdoba Open =

- Date: 5–11 February 2024
- Edition: 6th
- Draw: 28S / 16D
- Prize money: $713,495
- Surface: Clay - outdoor
- Location: Córdoba, Argentina
- Venue: Estadio Mario Alberto Kempes

Champions

Singles
- (Italy) Luciano Darderi

Doubles
- (Argentina) Máximo González / (Argentina) Andrés Molteni
← 2023 ·	Córdoba Open

The 2024 Córdoba Open was a men's tennis tournament played on outdoor clay courts. It was the 6th edition of the Córdoba Open, and part of the ATP Tour 250 series of the 2024 ATP Tour. It took place at the Estadio Mario Alberto Kempes in Córdoba, Argentina, from 3 February until 11 February 2024.

== Finals ==
=== Singles ===
- (Italy) Luciano Darderi def. (Argentina) Facundo Bagnis, 6–1, 6–4

=== Doubles ===
- (Argentina) Máximo González / (Argentina) Andrés Molteni def. (France) Sadio Doumbia / (France) Fabien Reboul, 6–4, 6–1

== Singles main draw entrants ==
=== Seeds ===
Country	Player	Rank^{1}	Seed
ARG	Francisco Cerúndolo	22	1
ARG	Sebastián Báez	25	2
ARG	Tomás Martín Etcheverry	28	3
AUT	Sebastian Ofner	40	4
GER	Daniel Altmaier	52	5
~~CHI~~	~~Alejandro Tabilo~~	~~54~~	~~6~~
GER	Yannick Hanfmann	58	7
ESP	Roberto Carballés Baena	65	8

- ^{1} Rankings are as of 29 January 2024.

=== Other entrants ===
The following players received wildcards into the singles main draw:

- (Argentina) Juan Manuel Cerúndolo
- (Argentina) Francisco Comesaña
- (Argentina) Mariano Navone

The following players received entry from the qualifying draw:

- (Argentina) Facundo Bagnis
- (Argentina) Román Andrés Burruchaga
- (Italy) Luciano Darderi
- (Argentina) Federico Agustín Gómez

The following player received entry as a lucky loser:

- (Argentina) Thiago Agustín Tirante

=== Withdrawals ===
- (Chile) Alejandro Tabilo → replaced by (Argentina) Thiago Agustin Tirante

== Doubles main draw entrants ==
=== Seeds ===
Country	Player	Country	Player	Rank^{1}	Seed
ARG	Máximo González	ARG	Andrés Molteni	26	1
FRA	Sadio Doumbia	FRA	Fabien Reboul	70	2
BRA	Marcelo Melo	NED	Matwé Middelkoop	94	3
COL	Nicolás Barrientos	BRA	Rafael Matos	119	4

- ^{1} Rankings are as of 29 January 2024.

=== Other entrants ===
The following pairs received wildcards into the doubles main draw:

- (Argentina) Facundo Bagnis / (Argentina) Nicolás Kicker
- (Argentina) Federico Agustín Gómez / (Argentina) Renzo Olivo

The following pair received entry as alternates:

- (Italy) Luciano Darderi / (Bolivia) Hugo Dellien

=== Withdrawals ===
- (Chile) Tomas Barrios Vera / (Chile) Alejandro Tabilo → replaced by (Italy) Luciano Darderi / (Bolivia) Hugo Dellien
- (Argentina) Pedro Cachín / (Argentina) Federico Coria
- (Spain) Roberto Carballés Baena / (Spain) Bernabé Zapata Miralles
- (Argentina) Tomás Martín Etcheverry / (Argentina) Thiago Agustin Tirante
- (Spain) Pedro Martínez / (Spain) Albert Ramos Viñolas → replaced by (Brazil) Fernando Romboli / (Brazil) Marcelo Zormann
- (Italy) Andrea Pellegrino / (Italy) Andrea Vavassori → replaced by (Argentina) Guido Andreozzi / (Argentina) Guillermo Durán
