= 2019 Córdoba Open =

- Date: 4–10 February
- Edition: 1st
- Category: ATP Tour 250 series
- Draw: 28S / 16D
- Prize money: S527,880
- Surface: Clay / outdoor
- Location: Córdoba, Argentina
- Venue: Estadio Mario Alberto Kempes

Champions

Singles
- (Argentina) Juan Ignacio Londero

Doubles
- (Czech Republic) Roman Jebavý / (Argentina) Andrés Molteni
- Córdoba Open

The 2019 Córdoba Open was a men's tennis tournament played on outdoor clay courts. It was the 1st edition of the Córdoba Open (replacing the Ecuador Open Quito), and part of the ATP Tour 250 series of the 2019 ATP Tour. It took place at the Estadio Mario Alberto Kempes in Córdoba, Argentina, from 4 February through 10 February 2019. Unseeded Juan Ignacio Londero, who entered on a wildcard, won the singles title.

== Finals ==
=== Singles ===
- (Argentina) Juan Ignacio Londero defeated (Argentina) Guido Pella, 3–6, 7–5, 6–1

=== Doubles ===
- (Czech Republic) Roman Jebavý / (Argentina) Andrés Molteni defeated (Argentina) Máximo González / (Argentina) Horacio Zeballos, 6–4, 7–6^{(7–4)}

== Singles main-draw entrants ==
=== Seeds ===
Country	Player	Rank^{1}	Seed
ITA	Fabio Fognini	15	1
ITA	Marco Cecchinato	19	2
ARG	Diego Schwartzman	20	3
ESP	Pablo Carreño Busta	23	4
CHI	Nicolás Jarry	41	5
TUN	Malek Jaziri	43	6
ARG	Leonardo Mayer	49	7
ARG	Guido Pella	60	8

- ^{1} Rankings are as of January 28, 2019

=== Other entrants ===
The following players received wildcards into the singles main draw:

- (Argentina) Carlos Berlocq
- (Argentina) Juan Ignacio Londero
- (Brazil) Thiago Seyboth Wild

The following players received entry from the qualifying draw:

- (Argentina) Facundo Bagnis
- (Argentina) Pedro Cachin
- (Italy) Alessandro Giannessi
- (Slovakia) Andrej Martin

The following players received entry as lucky losers:

- (Bolivia) Hugo Dellien
- (Italy) Paolo Lorenzi

=== Withdrawals ===
- (Japan) Taro Daniel → replaced by (Italy) Lorenzo Sonego
- (Chile) Cristian Garín → replaced by (Bolivia) Hugo Dellien
- (Austria) Dominic Thiem → replaced by (Italy) Paolo Lorenzi

=== Retirements ===
- (Spain) Pablo Carreño Busta

== Doubles main-draw entrants ==
=== Seeds ===
Country	Player	Country	Player	Rank^{1}	Seed
ARG	Máximo González	ARG	Horacio Zeballos	64	1
BRA	Marcelo Demoliner	DEN	Frederik Nielsen	109	2
CZE	Roman Jebavý	ARG	Andrés Molteni	109	3
ESA	Marcelo Arévalo	USA	James Cerretani	126	4

- ^{1} Rankings are as of January 28, 2019

=== Other entrants ===
The following pairs received wildcards into the doubles main draw:

- (Argentina) Facundo Argüello / (Argentina) Pedro Cachin
- (Argentina) Facundo Bagnis / (Argentina) Guillermo Durán

=== Withdrawals ===
During the tournament

- (Spain) Pablo Carreño Busta
