= 2022 Córdoba Open =

- Date: 31 January–6 February
- Edition: 4th
- Category: ATP Tour 250 series
- Draw: 28S / 16D
- Surface: Clay / outdoor
- Location: Córdoba, Argentina
- Venue: Estadio Mario Alberto Kempes

Champions

Singles
- (Spain) Albert Ramos Viñolas

Doubles
- (Mexico) Santiago González / (Argentina) Andrés Molteni
- Córdoba Open

The 2022 Córdoba Open was a men's tennis tournament played on outdoor clay courts. It was the fourth edition of the Córdoba Open, and part of the ATP Tour 250 series of the 2022 ATP Tour. It took place at the Estadio Mario Alberto Kempes in Córdoba, Argentina, from 31 January until 6 February 2022. Sixth-seeded Albert Ramos Viñolas won the singles title.

== Finals ==
=== Singles ===
- (Spain) Albert Ramos Viñolas defeated (Chile) Alejandro Tabilo, 4–6, 6–3, 6–4

=== Doubles ===
- (Mexico) Santiago González / (Argentina) Andrés Molteni defeated (Slovakia) Andrej Martin / (Austria) Tristan-Samuel Weissborn, 7–5, 6–3

== Point and prize money ==
=== Point distribution ===
Event	W	F	SF	QF	Round of 16	Round of 32	Q	Q2	Q1
Singles	250	150	90	45	20	0	12	6	0
Doubles	250	150	90	45	0	—N/a	—N/a	—N/a	—N/a

=== Prize money ===
Event	W	F	SF	QF	Round of 16	Round of 32	Q2	Q1
Singles	$46,175	$32,320	$21,410	$14,275	$9,235	$5,035	$2,520	$1,260
Doubles	$16,370	$11,760	$7,560	$5,030	$2,940	—N/a	—N/a	—N/a
Doubles prize money per team

== Singles main draw entrants ==
=== Seeds ===
Country	Player	Rank^{1}	Seed
ARG	Diego Schwartzman	13	1
~~AUT~~	~~Dominic Thiem~~	~~16~~	~~2~~
CHI	Cristian Garín	19	3
ITA	Lorenzo Sonego	26	4
ARG	Federico Delbonis	38	5
ESP	Albert Ramos Viñolas	44	6
FRA	Benoît Paire	56	7
ESP	Pedro Martínez	61	8

- ^{1} Rankings are as of 17 January 2022.

=== Other entrants ===
The following players received wildcards into the singles main draw:

- (Argentina) Francisco Cerúndolo
- (Argentina) Tomás Martín Etcheverry
- (Argentina) Juan Ignacio Londero

The following players received entry using a protected ranking into the singles main draw:

- (Germany) Yannick Hanfmann
- (Spain) Fernando Verdasco

The following players received entry from the qualifying draw:

- (Argentina) Juan Pablo Ficovich
- (Chile) Nicolás Jarry
- (Chile) Alejandro Tabilo
- (Peru) Juan Pablo Varillas

The following player received entry as a lucky loser:

- (Colombia) Daniel Elahi Galán
- (Serbia) Nikola Milojević

=== Withdrawals ===
Before the tournament

- (Argentina) Juan Manuel Cerúndolo → replaced by (Colombia) Daniel Elahi Galán
- (Uruguay) Pablo Cuevas → replaced by (Bolivia) Hugo Dellien
- (Serbia) Laslo Đere → replaced by (Spain) Carlos Taberner
- (Italy) Fabio Fognini → replaced by (Slovakia) Andrej Martin
- (Serbia) Miomir Kecmanović → replaced by (Denmark) Holger Rune
- (Austria) Dominic Thiem → replaced by (Serbia) Nikola Milojević

== Doubles main draw entrants ==
=== Seeds ===
Country	Player	Country	Player	Rank^{1}	Seed
MEX	Santiago González	ARG	Andrés Molteni	83	1
MON	Romain Arneodo	FRA	Benoît Paire	142	2
SWE	André Göransson	USA	Nathaniel Lammons	146	3
ARG	Guillermo Durán	ARG	Máximo González	147	4

- ^{1} Rankings are as of 17 January 2022.

=== Other entrants ===
The following players received wildcards into the doubles main draw:

- (Argentina) Pedro Cachin / (Argentina) Tomás Martín Etcheverry
- (Argentina) Juan Pablo Ficovich / (Argentina) Facundo Mena

=== Withdrawals ===
Before the tournament

- (Spain) Pablo Andújar / (Spain) Pedro Martínez → replaced by (Argentina) Sebastián Báez / (Spain) Pedro Martínez
- (Bosnia and Herzegovina) Tomislav Brkić / (Serbia) Nikola Ćaćić → replaced by (Brazil) Orlando Luz / (Brazil) Thiago Monteiro
- (Brazil) Marcelo Demoliner / (Serbia) Miomir Kecmanović → replaced by (Slovakia) Andrej Martin / (Austria) Tristan-Samuel Weissborn
- (Kazakhstan) Andrey Golubev / (Croatia) Franko Škugor → replaced by (Venezuela) Luis David Martínez / (Brazil) Fernando Romboli
