= 2019 Banja Luka Challenger – Doubles =

Doubles
- 2019 Banja Luka Challenger

Final
- Champions: (France) Sadio Doumbia (France) Fabien Reboul
- Runners-up: (Peru) Sergio Galdós (Argentina) Facundo Mena
- Score: 6–3, 7–6^{(7–4)}

Events
Singles	Doubles
← 2018 ·	Banja Luka Challenger	· 2021 →

Andrej Martin and Hans Podlipnik Castillo were the defending champions but chose not to defend their title.

Sadio Doumbia and Fabien Reboul won the title after defeating Sergio Galdós and Facundo Mena 6–3, 7–6^{(7–4)} in the final.

== Seeds ==
1. (Croatia) Tomislav Draganja / (Switzerland) Luca Margaroli (quarterfinals)
2. (Philippines) Ruben Gonzales / (Sweden) Andreas Siljeström (first round)
3. (Croatia) Ivan Sabanov / (Croatia) Matej Sabanov (semifinals)
4. (France) Sadio Doumbia / (France) Fabien Reboul (champions)

== Draw ==
=== Key ===
- Q = Qualifier
- WC = Wild card
- LL = Lucky loser
- Alt = Alternate
- SE = Special exempt
- PR = Protected ranking
- ITF = ITF entry
- JE = Junior exempt
- w/o = Walkover
- r = Retired
- d = Defaulted
- SR = Special ranking

First round
1	(Croatia) T Draganja (Switzerland) L Margaroli	6	6
(Kazakhstan) D Popko (Chile) A Tabilo	4	3
WC	(Germany) Lucas Gerch (Serbia) Milan Radojković	2	2
(Peru) S Galdós (Argentina) F Mena	6	6
3	(Croatia) I Sabanov (Croatia) M Sabanov	7^{7}	7
(Australia) C O'Connell (Serbia) D Petrović	6^{4}	5
(Netherlands) T Griekspoor (Netherlands) J Sels	2	2
(Czech Republic) Z Kolář (Croatia) N Serdarušić	6	6
(Argentina) F Coria (Argentina) Matías Zukas	3	4
(Italy) A Arnaboldi (Italy) F Baldi	6	6
WC	(China) Gao Qun (Croatia) A Šančić	6^{2}	5
4	(France) S Doumbia (France) F Reboul	7^{7}	7
(Argentina) C Berlocq (Brazil) R Dutra Silva	1	6	[10]
(Italy) GM Moroni (Spain) Jaume Pla Malfeito	6	3	[7]
WC	(Bosnia and Herzegovina) Nemanja Malešević (Bosnia and Herzegovina) Vladan Tadić	7	6
2	(Philippines) R Gonzales (Sweden) A Siljeström	5	3

Quarterfinals
1	(Croatia) T Draganja (Switzerland) L Margaroli	2	4
(Peru) S Galdós (Argentina) F Mena	6	6
3	(Croatia) I Sabanov (Croatia) M Sabanov	6	7
(Czech Republic) Z Kolář (Croatia) N Serdarušić	4	5
(Italy) A Arnaboldi (Italy) F Baldi	3	5
4	(France) S Doumbia (France) F Reboul	6	7
(Argentina) C Berlocq (Brazil) R Dutra Silva
WC	(Bosnia and Herzegovina) N Malešević (Bosnia and Herzegovina) V Tadić	w/o

Semifinals
(Peru) S Galdós (Argentina) F Mena	7^{7}	6
3	(Croatia) I Sabanov (Croatia) M Sabanov	6^{3}	3
4	(France) S Doumbia (France) F Reboul	6	6
WC	(Bosnia and Herzegovina) N Malešević (Bosnia and Herzegovina) V Tadić	4	1

Final
(Peru) S Galdós (Argentina) F Mena	3	6^{4}
4	(France) S Doumbia (France) F Reboul	6	7^{7}
