= 2024 Córdoba Open – Singles =

Singles
- 2024 Córdoba Open

Final
- Champion: (Italy) Luciano Darderi
- Runner-up: (Argentina) Facundo Bagnis
- Score: 6–1, 6–4

Details
- Draw: 28 (4Q, 3WC)
- Seeds: 8

Events
Singles	Doubles
← 2023 ·	Córdoba Open

Luciano Darderi defeated Facundo Bagnis in the final, 6–1, 6–4 to win the singles tennis title at the 2024 Córdoba Open. It was his first ATP Tour title. This was only the third final in ATP history to be contested between two qualifiers, following the 2015 Sydney International and the 2018 Austrian Open.

Sebastián Báez was the defending champion, but lost in the semifinals to Darderi.

== Seeds ==
The top four seeds received a bye into the second round.

1. (Argentina) Francisco Cerúndolo (second round)
2. (Argentina) Sebastián Báez (semifinals)
3. (Argentina) Tomás Martín Etcheverry (quarterfinals)
4. (Austria) Sebastian Ofner (second round)
5. (Germany) Daniel Altmaier (first round)
6. (Chile) Alejandro Tabilo (withdrew)
7. (Germany) Yannick Hanfmann (quarterfinals)
8. (Spain) Roberto Carballés Baena (second round)

== Draw ==
=== Key ===
- Q = Qualifier
- WC = Wild card
- LL = Lucky loser
- Alt = Alternate
- ITF = ITF entry
- PR = Protected ranking
- SR = Special ranking
- SE = Special exempt
- JE = Junior exempt
- JR = Junior Accelerator Programme entrant
- CO = College Accelerator Programme entrant
- NG = Next Gen Accelerator Program entrant
- w/o = Walkover
- r = Retired
- d = Defaulted

=== Finals ===
Semifinals
Q	(Argentina) Facundo Bagnis	6	7
(Argentina) Federico Coria	3	5
Q	(Italy) Luciano Darderi	6	3	6
2	(Argentina) Sebastián Báez	1	6	3

Final
Q	(Argentina) Facundo Bagnis	1	4
Q	(Italy) Luciano Darderi	6	6

=== Top half ===
First round
(Colombia) DE Galán	2	4
(Spain) J Munar	6	6
Q	(Argentina) F Bagnis	6	6
WC	(Argentina) JM Cerúndolo	4	2
WC	(Argentina) M Navone	6	3	3
8	(Spain) R Carballés Baena	3	6	6
(Spain) B Zapata Miralles	1	7^{7}	3
(Chile) C Garín	6	6^{3}	0^{r}
(Spain) A Ramos Viñolas	6	3	6
(Argentina) P Cachín	4	6	1
(Argentina) F Coria	5	6	6
5	(Germany) D Altmaier	7	3	4

Second round
1	(Argentina) F Cerúndolo	5	4
(Spain) J Munar	7	6
Q	(Argentina) F Bagnis	7^{7}	6
8	(Spain) R Carballés Baena	6^{5}	4
3	(Argentina) TM Etcheverry	7	6
(Spain) B Zapata Miralles	5	4
(Spain) A Ramos Viñolas	1	3
(Argentina) F Coria	6	6

Quarterfinals
(Spain) J Munar	5	4
Q	(Argentina) F Bagnis	7	6
3	(Argentina) TM Etcheverry	3	4
(Argentina) F Coria	6	6

Semifinals
Q	(Argentina) F Bagnis	6	7
(Argentina) F Coria	3	5

=== Bottom half ===
First round
7	(Germany) Y Hanfmann	5	7^{7}	6
(Peru) JP Varillas	7	6^{1}	1
Q	(Argentina) RA Burruchaga	6	4	6
(Argentina) D Schwartzman	1	6	4
Q	(Italy) L Darderi	4	6	6
(Chile) T Barrios Vera	6	1	2
LL	(Argentina) TA Tirante	6	7^{7}
WC	(Argentina) F Comesaña	1	6^{4}
(Argentina) F Díaz Acosta	6	6
Q	(Argentina) FA Gómez	1	4
(Bolivia) H Dellien	6	2	6
(Brazil) T Seyboth Wild	4	6	3

Second round
7	(Germany) Y Hanfmann	3	6	6
Q	(Argentina) RA Burruchaga	6	1	4
Q	(Italy) L Darderi	6	6
4	(Austria) S Ofner	0	3
LL	(Argentina) TA Tirante	2	7^{7}	2
(Argentina) F Díaz Acosta	6	6^{5}	6
(Bolivia) H Dellien	6	3	4
2	(Argentina) S Báez	4	6	6

Quarterfinals
7	(Germany) Y Hanfmann	6^{2}	1
Q	(Italy) L Darderi	7^{7}	6
(Argentina) F Díaz Acosta	3	1
2	(Argentina) S Báez	6	6

Semifinals
Q	(Italy) L Darderi	6	3	6
2	(Argentina) S Báez	1	6	3

== Qualifying ==
=== Seeds ===
1. (Argentina) Thiago Agustín Tirante (qualifying competition, lucky loser)
2. (Italy) Luciano Darderi (qualified)
3. (France) Corentin Moutet (first round)
4. (Argentina) Román Andrés Burruchaga (qualified)
5. (Argentina) Genaro Alberto Olivieri (first round)
6. Ivan Gakhov (first round)
7. (Italy) Marco Cecchinato (qualifying competition)
8. (Argentina) Santiago Rodríguez Taverna (first round)

=== Qualifiers ===
1. (Argentina) Facundo Bagnis
2. (Italy) Luciano Darderi
3. (Argentina) Federico Agustín Gómez
4. (Argentina) Román Andrés Burruchaga

=== Lucky loser ===
1. (Argentina) Thiago Agustín Tirante

=== Qualifying draw ===
==== First qualifier ====
First round
1	(Argentina) Thiago Agustín Tirante	6	6
WC	(Argentina) Alex Barrena	3	4
(Argentina) Facundo Bagnis	6	6
8	(Argentina) Santiago Rodríguez Taverna	0	0

Qualifying competition
1	(Argentina) Thiago Agustín Tirante	6^{5}	3
(Argentina) Facundo Bagnis	7^{7}	6

==== Second qualifier ====
First round
2	(Italy) Luciano Darderi	6	6
(Italy) Alessandro Giannessi	2	0
(Argentina) Andrea Collarini	7^{7}	6
6	Ivan Gakhov	6^{5}	1

Qualifying competition
2	(Italy) Luciano Darderi	6	7^{7}
(Argentina) Andrea Collarini	3	6^{3}

==== Third qualifier ====
First round
3	(France) Corentin Moutet	6	3	6^{1}
Alt	(Argentina) Federico Agustín Gómez	2	6	7^{7}
Alt	(Argentina) Renzo Olivo	6	6
5	(Argentina) Genaro Alberto Olivieri	4	2

Qualifying competition
Alt	(Argentina) Federico Agustín Gómez	6	6
Alt	(Argentina) Renzo Olivo	4	4

==== Fourth qualifier ====
First round
4	(Argentina) Román Andrés Burruchaga	6	6
WC	(Argentina) Hernán Casanova	4	2
PR	(Argentina) Nicolás Kicker	1	4
7	(Italy) Marco Cecchinato	6	6

Qualifying competition
4	(Argentina) Román Andrés Burruchaga	6	6
7	(Italy) Marco Cecchinato	3	0
