= 2024 Arizona Tennis Classic – Singles =

Singles
- 2024 Arizona Tennis Classic

Final
- Champion: (Portugal) Nuno Borges
- Runner-up: (Italy) Matteo Berrettini
- Score: 7–5, 7–6^{(7–4)}

Events
Singles	Doubles
← 2023 ·	Arizona Tennis Classic	· 2025 →

Nuno Borges was the defending champion and successfully defended his title after defeating Matteo Berrettini 7–5, 7–6^{(7–4)} in the final.

== Seeds ==
1. (United States) Christopher Eubanks (first round)
2. (Austria) Sebastian Ofner (first round)
3. Roman Safiullin (first round)
4. (Germany) Yannick Hanfmann (first round)
5. (Portugal) Nuno Borges (champion)
6. (Spain) Roberto Carballés Baena (first round, retired)
7. (Australia) Aleksandar Vukic (semifinals)
8. (France) Arthur Cazaux (second round)

== Draw ==
=== Key ===
- Q = Qualifier
- WC = Wild card
- LL = Lucky loser
- Alt = Alternate
- SE = Special exempt
- PR = Protected ranking
- ITF = ITF entry
- JE = Junior exempt
- w/o = Walkover
- r = Retired
- d = Defaulted
- SR = Special ranking

=== Finals ===
Semifinals
5	(Portugal) Nuno Borges	6	4	6
(France) Luca Van Assche	4	6	2
7	(Australia) Aleksandar Vukic	6^{2}	6^{2}
WC	(Italy) Matteo Berrettini	7^{7}	7^{7}

Final
5	(Portugal) Nuno Borges	7	7^{7}
WC	(Italy) Matteo Berrettini	5	6^{4}

=== Top half ===
First round
1	(United States) C Eubanks	5	5
Alt	(Australia) T Kokkinakis	7	7
Alt	(France) A Rinderknech	6	6
(Australia) R Hijikata	4	2
Alt	(France) B Paire	5	6	6
Alt	(Serbia) H Medjedovic	7	4	3
(France) A Müller	2	4
5	(Portugal) N Borges	6	6
3	R Safiullin	3	6	1
WC	(United States) D Kudla	6	3	6
Alt	(Austria) J Rodionov	4	4
(Colombia) DE Galán	6	6
Q	(Chile) C Garín	6	4	4
(France) L Van Assche	2	6	6
Alt	(France) C Lestienne	6	4
6	(Spain) R Carballés Baena	0	1^{r}

Second round
Alt	(Australia) T Kokkinakis	6	2	6
Alt	(France) A Rinderknech	1	6	4
Alt	(France) B Paire	2^{r}
5	(Portugal) N Borges	4
WC	(United States) D Kudla	6	6
(Colombia) DE Galán	2	3
(France) L Van Assche	4
Alt	(France) C Lestienne	1^{r}

Quarterfinals
Alt	(Australia) T Kokkinakis	6^{1}	1
5	(Portugal) N Borges	7^{7}	6
WC	(United States) D Kudla	3	1
(France) L Van Assche	6	6

Semifinals
5	(Portugal) N Borges	6	4	6
(France) L Van Assche	4	6	2

=== Bottom half ===
First round
7	(Australia) A Vukic	6	6
LL	(Czech Republic) V Kopřiva	1	0
Alt	(Italy) F Fognini	7^{7}	6
WC	(United States) M Mmoh	6^{4}	2
Alt	(United States) JJ Wolf	6	5	6^{5}
Alt	(France) Q Halys	2	7	7^{7}
Q	(United States) E Nava	6	6
4	(Germany) Y Hanfmann	4	0
8/Alt	(France) A Cazaux	7^{7}	6
Q	(Australia) A Walton	6^{5}	4
(France) H Gaston	6	3	1
WC	(Italy) M Berrettini	3	6	6
Q	(United States) M Krueger	3	5
Q	(United States) Z Svajda	6	7
Q	(France) T Atmane	7^{7}	1	6
2	(Austria) S Ofner	6^{5}	6	4

Second round
7	(Australia) A Vukic	6	6
Alt	(Italy) F Fognini	1	1
Alt	(France) Q Halys	6	3	6
Q	(United States) E Nava	1	6	3
8/Alt	(France) A Cazaux	6	1	5
WC	(Italy) M Berrettini	3	6	7
Q	(United States) Z Svajda	5	6	3
Q	(France) T Atmane	7	2	6

Quarterfinals
7	(Australia) A Vukic	6	6
Alt	(France) Q Halys	4	4
WC	(Italy) M Berrettini	3	7^{7}	7^{8}
Q	(France) T Atmane	6	6^{1}	6^{6}

Semifinals
7	(Australia) A Vukic	6^{2}	6^{2}
WC	(Italy) M Berrettini	7^{7}	7^{7}
