= 2019 Córdoba Open – Doubles =

Doubles
- 2019 Córdoba Open

Final
- Champions: (Czech Republic) Roman Jebavý (Argentina) Andrés Molteni
- Runners-up: (Argentina) Máximo González (Argentina) Horacio Zeballos
- Score: 6–4, 7–6^{(7–4)}

Events
Singles	Doubles
Córdoba Open	· 2020 →

This was the first edition of the tournament.

Roman Jebavý and Andrés Molteni won the title, defeating Máximo González and Horacio Zeballos in the final, 6–4, 7–6^{(7–4)}.

== Seeds ==
1. (Argentina) Máximo González / (Argentina) Horacio Zeballos (final)
2. (Brazil) Marcelo Demoliner / (Denmark) Frederik Nielsen (first round)
3. (Czech Republic) Roman Jebavý / (Argentina) Andrés Molteni (champions)
4. (El Salvador) Marcelo Arévalo / (United States) James Cerretani (first round)

== Draw ==
=== Key ===
- Q = Qualifier
- WC = Wild card
- LL = Lucky loser
- Alt = Alternate
- SE = Special exempt
- PR = Protected ranking
- ITF = ITF entry
- JE = Junior exempt
- w/o = Walkover
- r = Retired
- d = Defaulted
- SR = Special ranking

=== Draw ===
First round
1	(Argentina) M González (Argentina) H Zeballos	6	6
(Argentina) G Andreozzi (Argentina) L Mayer	1	1
(Spain) P Carreño Busta (Spain) G Granollers	7^{7}	6^{5}	[10]
(Spain) D Marrero (Spain) J Munar	6^{4}	7^{7}	[8]
4	(El Salvador) M Arévalo (United States) J Cerretani	5	6^{5}
(Belgium) S Gillé (Belgium) J Vliegen	7	7^{7}
(Spain) R Carballés Baena (Tunisia) M Jaziri	7^{8}	2	[8]
WC	(Argentina) F Argüello (Argentina) P Cachin	6^{6}	6	[10]
(United States) N Monroe (Mexico) MÁ Reyes-Varela	7^{7}	6
(Uruguay) P Cuevas (Argentina) D Schwartzman	6^{4}	4
(Chile) N Jarry (Italy) P Lorenzi	3	4
3	(Czech Republic) R Jebavý (Argentina) A Molteni	6	6
(Slovenia) A Bedene (Germany) M Marterer	4	6	[10]
(Argentina) G Pella (Chile) H Podlipnik Castillo	6	1	[5]
WC	(Argentina) F Bagnis (Argentina) G Durán	6	6
2	(Brazil) M Demoliner (Denmark) F Nielsen	3	4

Quarterfinals
1	(Argentina) M González (Argentina) H Zeballos	w/o
(Spain) P Carreño Busta (Spain) G Granollers
(Belgium) S Gillé (Belgium) J Vliegen	6	4	[10]
WC	(Argentina) F Argüello (Argentina) P Cachin	4	6	[4]
(United States) N Monroe (Mexico) MÁ Reyes-Varela	3	6^{4}
3	(Czech Republic) R Jebavý (Argentina) A Molteni	6	7^{7}
(Slovenia) A Bedene (Germany) M Marterer	3	3
WC	(Argentina) F Bagnis (Argentina) G Durán	6	6

Semifinals
1	(Argentina) M González (Argentina) H Zeballos	4	7^{7}	[10]
(Belgium) S Gillé (Belgium) J Vliegen	6	6^{3}	[5]
3	(Czech Republic) R Jebavý (Argentina) A Molteni	6	6
WC	(Argentina) F Bagnis (Argentina) G Durán	4	4

Final
1	(Argentina) M González (Argentina) H Zeballos	4	6^{4}
3	(Czech Republic) R Jebavý (Argentina) A Molteni	6	7^{7}
