= 2023 Córdoba Open – Singles =

Singles
- 2023 Córdoba Open

Final
- Champion: (Argentina) Sebastián Báez
- Runner-up: (Argentina) Federico Coria
- Score: 6–1, 3–6, 6–3

Details
- Draw: 28 (4Q, 3WC)
- Seeds: 8

Events
| Singles | Doubles |
| ← 2022 · | Córdoba Open | · 2024 → |

Sebastián Báez defeated Federico Coria in the final, 6–1, 3–6, 6–3 to win the singles tennis title at the 2023 Córdoba Open.

Albert Ramos Viñolas was the defending champion, but lost to Coria in the semifinals.

== Seeds ==
The top four seeds received a bye into the second round.

1. (Argentina) Diego Schwartzman (second round)
2. (Argentina) Francisco Cerúndolo (quarterfinals, retired)
3. (Spain) Albert Ramos Viñolas (semifinals)
4. (Argentina) Sebastián Báez (champion)
5. (Argentina) Pedro Cachin (first round)
6. (Argentina) Federico Coria (final)
7. (Spain) Pedro Martínez (first round)
8. (Spain) Bernabé Zapata Miralles (second round)

== Draw ==
=== Key ===
- Q = Qualifier
- WC = Wild card
- LL = Lucky loser
- Alt = Alternate
- SE = Special exempt
- PR = Protected ranking
- ITF = ITF entry
- JE = Junior exempt
- w/o = Walkover
- r = Retired
- d = Defaulted
- SR = Special ranking

=== Finals ===
Semifinals
Q | (Bolivia) Hugo Dellien | 4 | 4
4 | (Argentina) Sebastián Báez | 6 | 6
3 | (Spain) Albert Ramos Viñolas | 4 | 6^{2}
6 | (Argentina) Federico Coria | 6 | 7^{7}

Final
4 | (Argentina) Sebastián Báez | 6 | 3 | 6
6 | (Argentina) Federico Coria | 1 | 6 | 3

=== Top half ===
First round
(Spain) P Andújar | 4 | 0^{r}
WC | (Argentina) JM Cerúndolo | 6 | 1
WC | (Argentina) G Pella | 6 | 6
Q | (Italy) A Vavassori | 2 | 2
Q | (Bolivia) H Dellien | 6 | 6
5 | (Argentina) P Cachin | 3 | 4
Q | (Italy) L Darderi | 6 | 6
(France) H Gaston | 4 | 3
(Colombia) DE Galán | 6^{6} | 2
WC | (Chile) T Barrios Vera | 7^{8} | 6
(Spain) R Carballés Baena | 7^{8} | 3 | 5
8 | (Spain) B Zapata Miralles | 6^{6} | 6 | 7

Second round
1 | (Argentina) D Schwartzman | 6^{6} | 1
WC | (Argentina) JM Cerúndolo | 7^{8} | 6
WC | (Argentina) G Pella | 3 | 4
Q | (Bolivia) H Dellien | 6 | 6
4 | (Argentina) S Báez | 6 | 6
Q | (Italy) L Darderi | 3 | 4
WC | (Chile) T Barrios Vera | 5 | 6 | 6
8 | (Spain) B Zapata Miralles | 7 | 4 | 3

Quarterfinals
WC | (Argentina) JM Cerúndolo | 7^{7} | 4 | 0
Q | (Bolivia) H Dellien | 6^{5} | 6 | 6
4 | (Argentina) S Báez | 6 | 3 | 6
WC | (Chile) T Barrios Vera | 1 | 6 | 1

Semifinals
Q | (Bolivia) H Dellien | 4 | 4
4 | (Argentina) S Báez | 6 | 6

=== Bottom half ===
First round
7 | (Spain) P Martínez | 6^{3} | 6 | 0
(Chile) C Garín | 7^{7} | 2 | 6
(Portugal) J Sousa | 3 | 7^{7} | 6
(Argentina) TM Etcheverry | 6 | 6^{5} | 4
(Serbia) D Lajović | 7^{7} | 6
(Peru) JP Varillas | 6^{3} | 3
6 | (Argentina) F Coria | 6^{5} | 6 | 6
(Brazil) T Monteiro | 7^{7} | 1 | 2
(Argentina) F Bagnis | 2 | 6^{4}
(Italy) M Cecchinato | 6 | 7^{7}
Q | (Argentina) F Delbonis | 6^{8} | 6 | 7^{8}
(Chile) A Tabilo | 7^{10} | 2 | 6^{6}

Second round
(Chile) C Garín | 5 | 6^{6}
(Portugal) J Sousa | 7 | 7^{8}
(Serbia) D Lajović | 4 | 6 | 2
3 | (Spain) A Ramos Viñolas | 6 | 2 | 6
6 | (Argentina) F Coria | 6 | 3
(Italy) M Cecchinato | 3 | 1^{r}
Q | (Argentina) F Delbonis | 3 | 6 | 5
2 | (Argentina) F Cerúndolo | 6 | 3 | 7

Quarterfinals
(Portugal) J Sousa | 4 | 6 | 1
3 | (Spain) A Ramos Viñolas | 6 | 2 | 6
6 | (Argentina) F Coria | 6 | 3
2 | (Argentina) F Cerúndolo | 3 | 0^{r}

Semifinals
3 | (Spain) A Ramos Viñolas | 4 | 6^{2}
6 | (Argentina) F Coria | 6 | 7^{7}

== Qualifying ==
=== Seeds ===
1. (Argentina) Federico Delbonis (qualified)
2. (Germany) Yannick Hanfmann (first round)
3. (Argentina) Camilo Ugo Carabelli (qualifying competition)
4. (Bolivia) Hugo Dellien (qualified)
5. (Italy) Franco Agamenone (first round)
6. (Argentina) Renzo Olivo (first round)
7. (Italy) Andrea Pellegrino (first round)
8. (Argentina) Facundo Díaz Acosta (withdrew)

=== Qualifiers ===
1. (Argentina) Federico Delbonis
2. (Italy) Luciano Darderi
3. (Italy) Andrea Vavassori
4. (Bolivia) Hugo Dellien

=== Qualifying draw ===
==== First qualifier ====
First round
1 | (Argentina) Federico Delbonis | 7 | 6
WC | (Argentina) Mariano Navone | 5 | 1
(Argentina) Thiago Agustín Tirante | 3 | 6 | 6
Alt | (Argentina) Andrea Collarini | 6 | 4 | 2

Qualifying competition
1 | (Argentina) Federico Delbonis | 6 | 7
(Argentina) Thiago Agustín Tirante | 1 | 5

==== Second qualifier ====
First round
2 | (Germany) Yannick Hanfmann | 3 | 4
(Italy) Luciano Darderi | 6 | 6
(Argentina) Juan Pablo Ficovich | 4 | 6 | 6
6 | (Argentina) Renzo Olivo | 6 | 1 | 4

Qualifying competition
(Italy) Luciano Darderi | 6 | 6
(Argentina) Juan Pablo Ficovich | 2 | 2

==== Third qualifier ====
First round
3 | (Argentina) Camilo Ugo Carabelli | 6 | 6
(Argentina) Facundo Mena | 3 | 4
(Italy) Andrea Vavassori | 6 | 6
7 | (Italy) Andrea Pellegrino | 3 | 2

Qualifying competition
3 | (Argentina) Camilo Ugo Carabelli | 7^{8} | 1 | 6^{4}
(Italy) Andrea Vavassori | 6^{6} | 6 | 7^{7}

==== Fourth qualifier ====
First round
4 | (Bolivia) Hugo Dellien | 6 | 4 | 7
WC | (Brazil) Thiago Seyboth Wild | 4 | 6 | 5
(Argentina) Nicolás Kicker | 7 | 5 | 6
5 | (Italy) Franco Agamenone | 5 | 7 | 4

Qualifying competition
4 | (Bolivia) Hugo Dellien | 4 | 6 | 6
(Argentina) Nicolás Kicker | 6 | 1 | 2
