= 2022 Córdoba Open – Doubles =

Doubles
- 2022 Córdoba Open

Final
- Champions: (Mexico) Santiago González (Argentina) Andrés Molteni
- Runners-up: (Slovakia) Andrej Martin (Austria) Tristan-Samuel Weissborn
- Score: 7–5, 6–3

Events
Singles	Doubles
← 2021 ·	Córdoba Open	· 2023 →

Santiago González and Andrés Molteni defeated Andrej Martin and Tristan-Samuel Weissborn in the final, 7–5, 6–3, to win the doubles tennis title at the 2022 Córdoba Open. It was their third career ATP Tour doubles title together. As alternates, Martin and Weissborn were competing in their second event as a team.

Rafael Matos and Felipe Meligeni Alves were the defending champions, but lost in the quarterfinals to Martin and Weissborn.

== Seeds ==
1. (Mexico) Santiago González / (Argentina) Andrés Molteni (champions)
2. (Monaco) Romain Arneodo / (France) Benoît Paire (first round)
3. (Sweden) André Göransson / (United States) Nathaniel Lammons (first round)
4. (Argentina) Guillermo Durán / (Argentina) Máximo González (semifinals)

== Draw ==
=== Key ===
- Q = Qualifier
- WC = Wild card
- LL = Lucky loser
- Alt = Alternate
- SE = Special exempt
- PR = Protected ranking
- ITF = ITF entry
- JE = Junior exempt
- w/o = Walkover
- r = Retired
- d = Defaulted
- SR = Special ranking

=== Draw ===
First round
1	(Mexico) S González (Argentina) A Molteni	6	3	[12]
(Brazil) O Luz (Brazil) T Monteiro	3	6	[10]
(Venezuela) LD Martínez (Brazil) F Romboli	4	6^{4}
(Italy) L Sonego (Italy) A Vavassori	6	7^{7}
4	(Argentina) G Durán (Argentina) M González	6	6
(Argentina) F Bagnis (Spain) A Ramos Viñolas	2	4
WC	(Argentina) JP Ficovich (Argentina) F Mena	6	7
(Chile) T Barrios Vera (Chile) C Garín	4	5
WC	(Argentina) P Cachin (Argentina) TM Etcheverry	6	6
(Argentina) F Coria (Argentina) F Delbonis	3	4
(Spain) R Carballés Baena (Spain) J Munar	7^{11}	6
3	(Sweden) A Göransson (United States) N Lammons	6^{9}	3
(Brazil) R Matos (Brazil) F Meligeni Alves	6	7
(Argentina) S Báez (Spain) P Martínez	4	5
Alt	(Slovakia) A Martin (Austria) T-S Weissborn	6	6
2	(Monaco) R Arneodo (France) B Paire	4	4

Quarterfinals
1	(Mexico) S González (Argentina) A Molteni	7^{8}	6^{2}	[10]
(Italy) L Sonego (Italy) A Vavassori	6^{6}	7^{7}	[3]
4	(Argentina) G Durán (Argentina) M González	6	6
WC	(Argentina) JP Ficovich (Argentina) F Mena	3	4
WC	(Argentina) P Cachin (Argentina) TM Etcheverry	2	4
(Spain) R Carballés Baena (Spain) J Munar	6	6
(Brazil) R Matos (Brazil) F Meligeni Alves	1	7	[7]
Alt	(Slovakia) A Martin (Austria) T-S Weissborn	6	5	[10]

Semifinals
1	(Mexico) S González (Argentina) A Molteni	6	6
4	(Argentina) G Durán (Argentina) M González	4	4
(Spain) R Carballés Baena (Spain) J Munar	6	3	[6]
Alt	(Slovakia) A Martin (Austria) T-S Weissborn	3	6	[10]

Final
1	(Mexico) S González (Argentina) A Molteni	7	6
Alt	(Slovakia) A Martin (Austria) T-S Weissborn	5	3
