= 2023 Córdoba Open – Doubles =

Doubles
- 2023 Córdoba Open

Final
- Champions: (Argentina) Máximo González (Argentina) Andrés Molteni
- Runners-up: (France) Sadio Doumbia (France) Fabien Reboul
- Score: 6–4, 6–4

Events
Singles	Doubles
← 2022 ·	Córdoba Open	· 2024 →

Defending champion Andrés Molteni and his partner Máximo González defeated Sadio Doumbia and Fabien Reboul in the final, 6–4, 6–4 to win the doubles tennis title at the 2023 Córdoba Open.

Santiago González and Molteni were the reigning champions, but González chose to compete in Montpellier instead.

== Seeds ==
1. (Brazil) Rafael Matos / (Spain) David Vega Hernández (semifinals)
2. (Argentina) Máximo González / (Argentina) Andrés Molteni (champions)
3. (France) Sadio Doumbia / (France) Fabien Reboul (final)
4. (Kazakhstan) Andrey Golubev / (Kazakhstan) Aleksandr Nedovyesov (semifinals)

== Draw ==
=== Key ===
- Q = Qualifier
- WC = Wild card
- LL = Lucky loser
- Alt = Alternate
- SE = Special exempt
- PR = Protected ranking
- ITF = ITF entry
- JE = Junior exempt
- w/o = Walkover
- r = Retired
- d = Defaulted
- SR = Special ranking

=== Draw ===
First round
1	(Brazil) R Matos (Spain) D Vega Hernández	6	1	[10]
PR	(Brazil) M Demoliner (Italy) A Vavassori	4	6	[3]
(Colombia) N Barrientos (Uruguay) A Behar	6^{5}	6	[11]
PR	(Bolivia) H Dellien (Argentina) G Pella	7^{7}	4	[9]
3	(France) S Doumbia (France) F Reboul	6	3	[10]
WC	(Argentina) N Kicker (Brazil) T Seyboth Wild	3	6	[7]
(Italy) M Cecchinato (Colombia) DE Galán	1	2
(Spain) R Carballés Baena (Spain) P Martínez	6	6
WC	(Argentina) G Andreozzi (Argentina) G Durán	6	6
(Argentina) F Coria (Argentina) TM Etcheverry	2	3
(Brazil) M Melo (Portugal) J Sousa	2	5
4	(Kazakhstan) A Golubev (Kazakhstan) A Nedovyesov	6	7
Alt	(Bolivia) B Arias (Bolivia) F Zeballos	7	7
(Portugal) F Cabral (Serbia) N Ćaćić	5	5
Alt	(Argentina) H Casanova (Argentina) A Collarini	3	6	[7]
2	(Argentina) M González (Argentina) A Molteni	6	3	[10]

Quarterfinals
1	(Brazil) R Matos (Spain) D Vega Hernández	6	3	[13]
(Colombia) N Barrientos (Uruguay) A Behar	4	6	[11]
3	(France) S Doumbia (France) F Reboul	6	4	[12]
(Spain) R Carballés Baena (Spain) P Martínez	2	6	[10]
WC	(Argentina) G Andreozzi (Argentina) G Durán	6	3	[6]
4	(Kazakhstan) A Golubev (Kazakhstan) A Nedovyesov	3	6	[10]
Alt	(Bolivia) B Arias (Bolivia) F Zeballos	2	4
2	(Argentina) M González (Argentina) A Molteni	6	6

Semifinals
1	(Brazil) R Matos (Spain) D Vega Hernández	6^{2}	2
3	(France) S Doumbia (France) F Reboul	7^{7}	6
4	(Kazakhstan) A Golubev (Kazakhstan) A Nedovyesov	4	3
2	(Argentina) M González (Argentina) A Molteni	6	6

Final
3	(France) S Doumbia (France) F Reboul	4	4
2	(Argentina) M González (Argentina) A Molteni	6	6
