= 2024 Córdoba Open – Doubles =

Doubles
- 2024 Córdoba Open

Final
- Champions: (Argentina) Máximo González (Argentina) Andrés Molteni
- Runners-up: (France) Sadio Doumbia (France) Fabien Reboul
- Score: 6–4, 6–1

Details
- Draw: 14
- Seeds: 4

Events
Singles	Doubles
← 2023 ·	Córdoba Open

Defending champions Máximo González and Andrés Molteni defeated Sadio Doumbia and Fabien Reboul in a rematch of the previous year's final, 6–4, 6–1 to win the doubles tennis title at the 2024 Córdoba Open.

== Seeds ==
1. (Argentina) Máximo González / (Argentina) Andrés Molteni (champions)
2. (France) Sadio Doumbia / (France) Fabien Reboul (final)
3. (Brazil) Marcelo Melo / (Netherlands) Matwé Middelkoop (first round)
4. (Colombia) Nicolás Barrientos / (Brazil) Rafael Matos (quarterfinals)

== Draw ==
=== Key ===
- Q = Qualifier
- WC = Wild card
- LL = Lucky loser
- Alt = Alternate
- ITF = ITF entry
- PR = Protected ranking
- SR = Special ranking
- SE = Special exempt
- JE = Junior exempt
- JR = Junior Accelerator Programme entrant
- CO = College Accelerator Programme entrant
- NG = Next Gen Accelerator Program entrant
- w/o = Walkover
- r = Retired
- d = Defaulted

=== Draw ===
First round
1	(Argentina) M González (Argentina) A Molteni	6	7^{7}
(Brazil) F Romboli (Brazil) M Zormann	0	6^{3}
3	(Brazil) M Melo (Netherlands) M Middelkoop	1	2
WC	(Argentina) FA Gómez (Argentina) R Olivo	6	6
(Argentina) P Cachín (Argentina) F Coria
(France) T Arribagé (France) L Sanchez	w/o
(Argentina) F Comesaña (Brazil) T Seyboth Wild	4	4
4	(Colombia) N Barrientos (Brazil) R Matos	6	6
(Romania) VV Cornea (Austria) P Oswald	7^{7}	7
(Argentina) G Andreozzi (Argentina) G Durán	6^{5}	5
WC	(Argentina) F Bagnis (Argentina) N Kicker	6^{5}	5
2	(France) S Doumbia (France) F Reboul	7^{7}	7

Quarterfinals
1	(Argentina) M González (Argentina) A Molteni	w/o
Alt	(Italy) L Darderi (Bolivia) H Dellien
WC	(Argentina) FA Gómez (Argentina) R Olivo	3	6	[10]
(France) T Arribagé (France) L Sanchez	6	3	[2]
(Bolivia) B Arias (Bolivia) F Zeballos	7	7^{7}
4	(Colombia) N Barrientos (Brazil) R Matos	5	6^{2}
(Romania) VV Cornea (Austria) P Oswald	6^{3}	3
2	(France) S Doumbia (France) F Reboul	7^{7}	6

Semifinals
1	(Argentina) M González (Argentina) A Molteni	7	6
WC	(Argentina) FA Gómez (Argentina) R Olivo	5	4
(Bolivia) B Arias (Bolivia) F Zeballos	5	4
2	(France) S Doumbia (France) F Reboul	7	6

Final
1	(Argentina) M González (Argentina) A Molteni	6	6
2	(France) S Doumbia (France) F Reboul	4	1
