= 2024 Arizona Tennis Classic – Doubles =

Doubles
- 2024 Arizona Tennis Classic

Final
- Champions: (France) Sadio Doumbia (France) Fabien Reboul
- Runners-up: (Australia) Rinky Hijikata (United Kingdom) Henry Patten
- Score: 6–3, 6–2

Events
| Singles | Doubles |
- Arizona Tennis Classic

Nathaniel Lammons and Jackson Withrow were the defending champions but chose not to defend their title.

Sadio Doumbia and Fabien Reboul won the title after defeating Rinky Hijikata and Henry Patten 6–3, 6–2 in the final.

== Seeds ==
1. (France) Sadio Doumbia / (France) Fabien Reboul (champions)
2. (France) Fabrice Martin / (Monaco) Hugo Nys (semifinals)
3. (United Kingdom) Julian Cash / (United States) Robert Galloway (semifinals)
4. (Germany) Andreas Mies / (Australia) John-Patrick Smith (first round)

== Draw ==
Key

- Q = Qualifier
- WC = Wild card
- LL = Lucky loser
- Alt = Alternate
- ITF = ITF entry
- PR = Protected ranking
- SR = Special ranking
- SE = Special exempt
- JE = Junior exempt
- JR = Junior Accelerator Programme entrant
- CO = College Accelerator Programme entrant
- NG = Next Gen Accelerator Program entrant
- w/o = Walkover
- r = Retired
- d = Defaulted

=== Draw ===
First round
1 | (France) S Doumbia (France) F Reboul | w/o
(France) A Müller (France) A Rinderknech
(South Korea) S-c Hong (Kazakhstan) B Zhukayev | 3 | 6 | [7]
WC | (United States) M Krueger (United States) D Kudla | 6 | 3 | [10]
3 | (United Kingdom) J Cash (United States) R Galloway | 6 | 6
(Czech Republic) V Kopřiva (Czech Republic) J Pospíšil | 2 | 3
A Kuznetsov; R Safiullin | 3 | 6 | [10]
(New Zealand) M Daniell (Mexico) MÁ Reyes-Varela | 6 | 2 | [6]
(Australia) R Hijikata (United Kingdom) H Patten | 7 | 5 | [10]
(Ecuador) G Escobar (Venezuela) LD Martínez | 5 | 7 | [5]
(Australia) M Polmans (Australia) A Walton | 6 | 7^{8}
4 | (Germany) A Mies (Australia) J-P Smith | 4 | 6^{6}
WC | (Italy) F Fognini (Australia) T Kokkinakis | 6 | 6
(Portugal) N Borges (Australia) A Vukic | 4 | 4
(Mexico) H Hach Verdugo (United States) N Moreno de Alboran | 3 | 2
2 | (France) F Martin (Monaco) H Nys | 6 | 6

Quarterfinals
1 | (France) S Doumbia (France) F Reboul | 7 | 6
WC | (United States) M Krueger (United States) D Kudla | 5 | 4
3 | (United Kingdom) J Cash (United States) R Galloway | w/o
A Kuznetsov; R Safiullin
(Australia) R Hijikata (United Kingdom) H Patten | w/o
(Australia) M Polmans (Australia) A Walton
WC | (Italy) F Fognini (Australia) T Kokkinakis
2 | (France) F Martin (Monaco) H Nys | w/o

Semifinals
1 | (France) S Doumbia (France) F Reboul | 6 | 6
3 | (United Kingdom) J Cash (United States) R Galloway | 3 | 4
(Australia) R Hijikata (United Kingdom) H Patten | 6 | 6
2 | (France) F Martin (Monaco) H Nys | 2 | 4

Final
1 | (France) S Doumbia (France) F Reboul | 6 | 6
(Australia) R Hijikata (United Kingdom) H Patten | 3 | 2
