= 2022 Córdoba Open – Singles =

Singles
- 2022 Córdoba Open

Final
- Champion: (Spain) Albert Ramos Viñolas
- Runner-up: (Chile) Alejandro Tabilo
- Score: 4–6, 6–3, 6–4

Details
- Draw: 28 (4Q, 3WC)
- Seeds: 8

Events
Singles	Doubles
← 2021 ·	Córdoba Open	· 2023 →

Albert Ramos Viñolas defeated Alejandro Tabilo in the final, 4–6, 6–3, 6–4 to win the singles title at the 2022 Córdoba Open.

Juan Manuel Cerúndolo was the defending champion, but withdrew with a right leg injury before the tournament began.

== Seeds ==
The top four seeds received a bye into the second round.

1. (Argentina) Diego Schwartzman (semifinals)
2. (Austria) Dominic Thiem (withdrew)
3. (Chile) Cristian Garín (second round)
4. (Italy) Lorenzo Sonego (quarterfinals)
5. (Argentina) Federico Delbonis (first round)
6. (Spain) Albert Ramos Viñolas (champion)
7. (France) Benoît Paire (first round)
8. (Spain) Pedro Martínez (second round)

== Draw ==
=== Key ===
- Q = Qualifier
- WC = Wild card
- LL = Lucky loser
- Alt = Alternate
- SE = Special exempt
- PR = Protected ranking
- ITF = ITF entry
- JE = Junior exempt
- w/o = Walkover
- r = Retired
- d = Defaulted
- SR = Special ranking

=== Finals ===
Semifinals
1	(Argentina) Diego Schwartzman	3	6^{6}
Q	(Chile) Alejandro Tabilo	6	7^{8}
6	(Spain) Albert Ramos Viñolas	7^{7}	6
WC	(Argentina) Juan Ignacio Londero	6^{4}	4

Final
Q	(Chile) Alejandro Tabilo	6	3	4
6	(Spain) Albert Ramos Viñolas	4	6	6

=== Top half ===
First round
(Argentina) F Coria	6^{5}	2
Q	(Argentina) JP Ficovich	7^{7}	6
LL	(Colombia) DE Galán	7	6
(Bolivia) H Dellien	5	3
(Spain) J Munar	6	7
7	(France) B Paire	4	5
(Argentina) S Báez	7^{8}	7
PR	(Spain) F Verdasco	6^{6}	5
Q	(Chile) A Tabilo	6	6
WC	(Argentina) F Cerúndolo	4	1
(Spain) C Taberner	6	6
5	(Argentina) F Delbonis	4	2

Second round
1	(Argentina) D Schwartzman	6	6
Q	(Argentina) JP Ficovich	3	2
LL	(Colombia) DE Galán	6	3	6
(Spain) J Munar	2	6	1
3	(Chile) C Garín	6	1	1
(Argentina) S Báez	4	6	6
Q	(Chile) A Tabilo	6	6
(Spain) C Taberner	2	4

Quarterfinals
1	(Argentina) D Schwartzman	3	6	7
LL	(Colombia) DE Galán	6	0	5
(Argentina) S Báez	1	6^{4}
Q	(Chile) A Tabilo	6	7^{7}

Semifinals
1	(Argentina) D Schwartzman	3	6^{6}
Q	(Chile) A Tabilo	6	7^{8}

=== Bottom half ===
First round
6	(Spain) A Ramos Viñolas	6	6
(Slovakia) A Martin	4	3
Q	(Peru) JP Varillas	6	5	7^{7}
(Argentina) F Bagnis	4	7	6^{5}
(Denmark) H Rune	2	4
(Spain) R Carballés Baena	6	6
8	(Spain) P Martínez	4	6	7^{7}
(Brazil) T Monteiro	6	4	6^{4}
PR	(Germany) Y Hanfmann	3	4
WC	(Argentina) JI Londero	6	6
WC	(Argentina) TM Etcheverry	2	6	6
Q	(Chile) N Jarry	6	3	4

Second round
6	(Spain) A Ramos Viñolas	6	2
Q	(Peru) JP Varillas	4	3^{r}
(Spain) R Carballés Baena	6	6^{1}	2
4	(Italy) L Sonego	4	7^{7}	6
8	(Spain) P Martínez	3	6^{3}
WC	(Argentina) JI Londero	6	7^{7}
WC	(Argentina) TM Etcheverry	3	6^{4}
LL	(Serbia) N Milojević	6	7^{7}

Quarterfinals
6	(Spain) A Ramos Viñolas	7^{7}	7
4	(Italy) L Sonego	6^{5}	5
WC	(Argentina) JI Londero	6	7
LL	(Serbia) N Milojević	4	5

Semifinals
6	(Spain) A Ramos Viñolas	7^{7}	6
WC	(Argentina) JI Londero	6^{4}	4

== Qualifying ==
=== Seeds ===
1. (Colombia) Daniel Elahi Galán (qualifying competition, lucky loser)
2. (Peru) Juan Pablo Varillas (qualified)
3. (Chile) Alejandro Tabilo (qualified)
4. (Serbia) Nikola Milojević (qualifying competition, lucky loser)
5. (Czech Republic) Zdeněk Kolář (first round)
6. (Chile) Nicolás Jarry (qualified)
7. (Chile) Tomás Barrios Vera (qualifying competition)
8. (Kazakhstan) Dmitry Popko (first round)

=== Qualifiers ===
1. (Chile) Nicolás Jarry
2. (Peru) Juan Pablo Varillas
3. (Chile) Alejandro Tabilo
4. (Argentina) Juan Pablo Ficovich

=== Lucky losers ===
1. (Colombia) Daniel Elahi Galán
2. (Serbia) Nikola Milojević

=== Qualifying draw ===
==== First qualifier ====
First round
1	(Colombia) Daniel Elahi Galán	6	6
WC	(Argentina) Nicolás Kicker	1	3
Alt	(France) Maxime Janvier	4	6^{6}
6	(Chile) Nicolás Jarry	6	7^{8}

Qualifying competition
1	(Colombia) Daniel Elahi Galán	4	7^{7}	5
6	(Chile) Nicolás Jarry	6	6^{3}	7

==== Second qualifier ====
First round
2	(Peru) Juan Pablo Varillas	7^{7}	6
(Italy) Alessandro Giannessi	6^{5}	2
(Argentina) Facundo Mena	3	2
7	(Chile) Tomás Barrios Vera	6	6

Qualifying competition
2	(Peru) Juan Pablo Varillas	6	6
7	(Chile) Tomás Barrios Vera	4	1

==== Third qualifier ====
First round
3	(Chile) Alejandro Tabilo	6	6
(Argentina) Renzo Olivo	2	2
Alt	(Argentina) Thiago Agustín Tirante	7	6
5	(Czech Republic) Zdeněk Kolář	5	3

Qualifying competition
3	(Chile) Alejandro Tabilo	6	6
Alt	(Argentina) Thiago Agustín Tirante	3	4

==== Fourth qualifier ====
First round
4	(Serbia) Nikola Milojević	6	6
(Brazil) Felipe Meligeni Alves	4	3
WC	(Argentina) Juan Pablo Ficovich	2	6	6
8	(Kazakhstan) Dmitry Popko	6	3	1

Qualifying competition
4	(Serbia) Nikola Milojević	3	7^{7}	5
WC	(Argentina) Juan Pablo Ficovich	6	6^{5}	7
