= 2023 Córdoba Open =

Tennis tournament

- Date: 4–12 February
- Edition: 5th
- Category: ATP Tour 250 series
- Draw: 28S / 16D
- Prize money: $713,495
- Surface: Clay / outdoor
- Location: Córdoba, Argentina
- Venue: Estadio Mario Alberto Kempes

Champions

Singles
- (Argentina) Sebastián Báez

Doubles
- (Argentina) Máximo González / (Argentina) Andrés Molteni
- Córdoba Open

The 2023 Córdoba Open was a men's tennis tournament played on outdoor clay courts. It was the fifth edition of the Córdoba Open, and part of the ATP Tour 250 series of the 2023 ATP Tour. It took place at the Estadio Mario Alberto Kempes in Córdoba, Argentina, from 4 February until 12 February 2023. Fourth-seeded Sebastián Báez won the singles title.

== Finals ==
=== Singles ===
- (Argentina) Sebastián Báez defeated (Argentina) Federico Coria, 6–1, 3–6, 6–3

=== Doubles ===
- (Argentina) Máximo González / (Argentina) Andrés Molteni defeated (France) Sadio Doumbia / (France) Fabien Reboul, 6–4, 6–4

== Point and prize money ==
=== Point distribution ===
Event	W	F	SF	QF	Round of 16	Round of 32	Q	Q2	Q1
Singles	250	150	90	45	20	0	12	6	0
Doubles	250	150	90	45	0	—N/a	—N/a	—N/a	—N/a

=== Prize money ===
Event	W	F	SF	QF	Round of 16	Round of 32	Q2	Q1
Singles	$46,175	$32,320	$21,410	$14,275	$9,235	$5,035	$2,520	$1,260
Doubles*	$16,370	$11,760	$7,560	$5,030	$2,940	—N/a	—N/a	—N/a
Doubles prize money per team

== Singles main draw entrants ==
=== Seeds ===
Country	Player	Rank^{1}	Seed
ARG	Diego Schwartzman	28	1
ARG	Francisco Cerúndolo	31	2
ESP	Albert Ramos Viñolas	37	3
ARG	Sebastián Báez	47	4
ARG	Pedro Cachin	68	5
ARG	Federico Coria	69	6
ESP	Pedro Martínez	72	7
ESP	Bernabé Zapata Miralles	74	8

- ^{1} Rankings are as of 30 January 2023.

=== Other entrants ===
The following players received wildcards into the singles main draw:

- (Chile) Tomás Barrios Vera
- (Argentina) Juan Manuel Cerúndolo
- (Argentina) Guido Pella

The following players received entry from the qualifying draw:

- (Italy) Luciano Darderi
- (Argentina) Federico Delbonis
- (Bolivia) Hugo Dellien
- (Italy) Andrea Vavassori

=== Withdrawals ===
Before the tournament

- (Serbia) Laslo Đere → replaced by (Peru) Juan Pablo Varillas
- (Italy) Fabio Fognini → replaced by (Spain) Pablo Andújar
- (France) Corentin Moutet → replaced by (Chile) Alejandro Tabilo
- (Spain) Jaume Munar → replaced by (France) Hugo Gaston

== Doubles main draw entrants ==
=== Seeds ===
Country	Player	Country	Player	Rank^{1}	Seed
BRA	Rafael Matos	ESP	David Vega Hernández	57	1
ARG	Máximo González	ARG	Andrés Molteni	81	2
FRA	Sadio Doumbia	FRA	Fabien Reboul	112	3
KAZ	Andrey Golubev	KAZ	Aleksandr Nedovyesov	113	4

- ^{1} Rankings are as of 30 January 2023.

=== Other entrants ===
The following pairs received wildcards into the doubles main draw:

- (Argentina) Guido Andreozzi / (Argentina) Guillermo Durán
- (Argentina) Nicolás Kicker / (Brazil) Thiago Seyboth Wild

The following pairs received entry as alternates:

- (Bolivia) Boris Arias / (Bolivia) Federico Zeballos
- (Argentina) Hernán Casanova / (Argentina) Andrea Collarini

=== Withdrawals ===
Before the tournament

- (Argentina) Pedro Cachin / (Argentina) Francisco Cerúndolo → replaced by (Bolivia) Boris Arias / (Bolivia) Federico Zeballos
- (Spain) Albert Ramos Viñolas / (Spain) Bernabé Zapata Miralles → replaced by (Argentina) Hernán Casanova / (Argentina) Andrea Collarini
