= 2019 Córdoba Open – Singles =

Singles
- 2019 Córdoba Open

Final
- Champion: (Argentina) Juan Ignacio Londero
- Runner-up: (Argentina) Guido Pella
- Score: 3–6, 7–5, 6–1

Details
- Draw: 28 (4 Q / 3 WC )
- Seeds: 8

Events
| Singles | Doubles |
- Córdoba Open

This was the first edition of the tournament.

Juan Ignacio Londero won the title, defeating Guido Pella in the final, 3–6, 7–5, 6–1. Notably, Londero had not won an ATP tour level match prior to the beginning of the tournament.

== Seeds ==
The top four seeds received a bye into the second round.

1. (Italy) Fabio Fognini (second round)
2. (Italy) Marco Cecchinato (second round)
3. (Argentina) Diego Schwartzman (quarterfinals)
4. (Spain) Pablo Carreño Busta (second round, retired)
5. (Chile) Nicolás Jarry (first round)
6. (Tunisia) Malek Jaziri (second round)
7. (Argentina) Leonardo Mayer (first round)
8. (Argentina) Guido Pella (final)

== Draw ==
Key

- Q = Qualifier
- WC = Wild card
- LL = Lucky loser
- Alt = Alternate
- ITF = ITF entry
- PR = Protected ranking
- SR = Special ranking
- SE = Special exempt
- JE = Junior exempt
- JR = Junior Accelerator Programme entrant
- CO = College Accelerator Programme entrant
- NG = Next Gen Accelerator Program entrant
- w/o = Walkover
- r = Retired
- d = Defaulted

=== Finals ===
Semifinals
(Uruguay) Pablo Cuevas | 1 | 6 | 3
8 | (Argentina) Guido Pella | 6 | 3 | 6
WC | (Argentina) Juan Ignacio Londero | 6 | 6
(Argentina) Federico Delbonis | 1 | 0

Final
8 | (Argentina) Guido Pella | 6 | 5 | 1
WC | (Argentina) Juan Ignacio Londero | 3 | 7 | 6

=== Top half ===
First round
(Slovenia) A Bedene | 6 | 6
(Germany) M Marterer | 3 | 4
Q | (Argentina) F Bagnis | 4 | 4
(Uruguay) P Cuevas | 6 | 6
WC | (Argentina) C Berlocq | 3 | 6 | 6^{4}
6 | (Tunisia) M Jaziri | 6 | 4 | 7^{7}
Q | (Italy) A Giannessi | 6^{8} | 7 | 7^{7}
WC | (Brazil) T Seyboth Wild | 7^{10} | 5 | 6^{4}
LL | (Bolivia) H Dellien | 6^{7} | 6 | 3
(Spain) A Ramos Viñolas | 7^{9} | 4 | 6
LL | (Italy) P Lorenzi | 1 | 3
8 | (Argentina) G Pella | 6 | 6

Second round
1 | (Italy) F Fognini | 1 | 4
(Slovenia) A Bedene | 6 | 6
(Uruguay) P Cuevas | 7^{7} | 6
6 | (Tunisia) M Jaziri | 6^{5} | 2
3 | (Argentina) D Schwartzman | 6^{4} | 6 | 6
Q | (Italy) A Giannessi | 7^{7} | 3 | 0
(Spain) A Ramos Viñolas | 4 | 6^{4}
8 | (Argentina) G Pella | 6 | 7^{7}

Quarterfinals
(Slovenia) A Bedene | 6^{2} | 1
(Uruguay) P Cuevas | 7^{7} | 6
3 | (Argentina) D Schwartzman | 5 | 2
8 | (Argentina) G Pella | 7 | 6

Semifinals
(Uruguay) P Cuevas | 1 | 6 | 3
8 | (Argentina) G Pella | 6 | 3 | 6

=== Bottom half ===
First round
5 | (Chile) N Jarry | 2 | 6^{5}
WC | (Argentina) JI Londero | 6 | 7^{7}
(Spain) P Andújar | 3 | 2
(Italy) L Sonego | 6 | 6
(United Kingdom) C Norrie | 4 | 4
Q | (Argentina) P Cachin | 6 | 6
7 | (Argentina) L Mayer | 4 | 7^{7} | 3
(Argentina) F Delbonis | 6 | 6^{5} | 6
Q | (Slovakia) A Martin | 3 | 2
(Spain) R Carballés Baena | 6 | 6
(Argentina) G Andreozzi | 1 | 4
(Spain) J Munar | 6 | 6

Second round
WC | (Argentina) JI Londero | 7 | 6
(Italy) L Sonego | 5 | 3
Q | (Argentina) P Cachin | 6^{3} | 1
4 | (Spain) P Carreño Busta | 7^{7} | 0^{r}
(Argentina) F Delbonis | 6^{3} | 6 | 6
(Spain) R Carballés Baena | 7^{7} | 2 | 2
(Spain) J Munar | 6 | 3 | 6
2 | (Italy) M Cecchinato | 3 | 6 | 1

Quarterfinals
WC | (Argentina) JI Londero | 6 | 7^{7}
Q | (Argentina) P Cachin | 4 | 6^{3}
(Argentina) F Delbonis | 7 | 6
(Spain) J Munar | 5 | 4

Semifinals
WC | (Argentina) JI Londero | 6 | 6
(Argentina) F Delbonis | 1 | 0

== Qualifying ==
=== Seeds ===
1. (Italy) Paolo Lorenzi (qualifying competition, lucky loser)
2. (Argentina) Marco Trungelliti (first round)
3. (Bolivia) Hugo Dellien (qualifying competition, lucky loser)
4. (Norway) Casper Ruud (first round)
5. (Argentina) Facundo Bagnis (qualified)
6. (Italy) Gianluigi Quinzi (qualifying competition)
7. (Italy) Alessandro Giannessi (qualified)
8. (Slovakia) Andrej Martin (qualified)

=== Qualifiers ===
1. (Italy) Alessandro Giannessi
2. (Argentina) Pedro Cachin
3. (Slovakia) Andrej Martin
4. (Argentina) Facundo Bagnis

=== Lucky losers ===
1. (Italy) Paolo Lorenzi
2. (Bolivia) Hugo Dellien

=== Qualifying draw ===
==== First qualifier ====
First round
1 | (Italy) Paolo Lorenzi | 3 | 6 | 6
(Argentina) Facundo Argüello | 6 | 3 | 4
WC | (Argentina) Facundo Díaz Acosta | 6^{4} | 2^{r}
7 | (Italy) Alessandro Giannessi | 7^{7} | 1

Qualifying competition
1 | (Italy) Paolo Lorenzi | 7^{7} | 4 | 6^{5}
7 | (Italy) Alessandro Giannessi | 6^{3} | 6 | 7^{7}

==== Second qualifier ====
First round
2 | (Argentina) Marco Trungelliti | 5 | 3
(Argentina) Pedro Cachin | 7 | 6
(Argentina) Andrea Collarini | 6 | 4 | 1
6 | (Italy) Gianluigi Quinzi | 4 | 6 | 6

Qualifying competition
(Argentina) Pedro Cachin | 6 | 7
6 | (Italy) Gianluigi Quinzi | 3 | 5

==== Third qualifier ====
First round
3 | (Bolivia) Hugo Dellien | 6 | 6
WC | (Argentina) Francisco Cerúndolo | 4 | 3
(Italy) Federico Gaio | 3 | 1
8 | (Slovakia) Andrej Martin | 6 | 6

Qualifying competition
3 | (Bolivia) Hugo Dellien | 6^{4} | 7^{7} | 5
8 | (Slovakia) Andrej Martin | 7^{7} | 6^{3} | 7

==== Fourth qualifier ====
First round
4 | (Norway) Casper Ruud | 5 | 4
(Argentina) Federico Coria | 7 | 6
(El Salvador) Marcelo Arévalo | 2 | 4
5 | (Argentina) Facundo Bagnis | 6 | 6

Qualifying competition
(Argentina) Federico Coria | 4 | 4
5 | (Argentina) Facundo Bagnis | 6 | 6
