= Fabien Reboul =

French tennis player (born 1995)

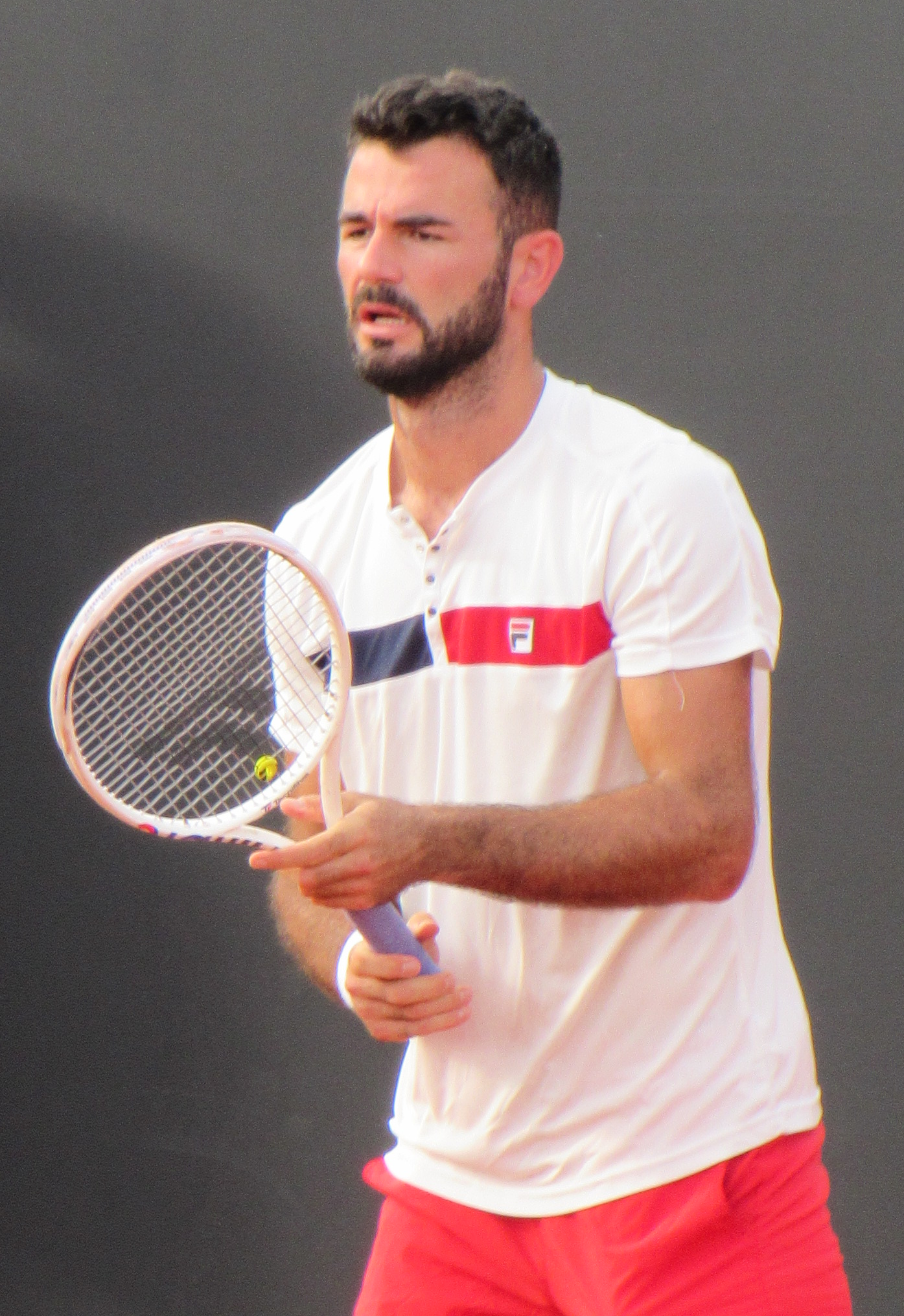
- Reboul at the 2024 Córdoba Open
- Country (sports): France
- Residence: Toulouse, France
- Born: 9 September 1995 (age 31) Toulouse, France
- Height: 1.85 m (6 ft 1 in)
- Plays: Right-handed (two-handed backhand)
- Coach: Philippe Reboul; Kevin Blandy
- Prize money: US $1,797,225

Singles
- Career record: 0–0
- Career titles: 3 ITF
- Highest ranking: No. 328 (17 December 2018)

Doubles
- Career record: 149–114
- Career titles: 7
- Highest ranking: No. 20 (3 August 2026)
- Current ranking: No. 20 (3 August 2026)

Grand Slam doubles results
- Australian Open: QF (2026)
- French Open: 3R (2023)
- Wimbledon: QF (2026)
- US Open: QF (2025)

Grand Slam mixed doubles results
- Wimbledon: 1R (2025)
- Last updated on: 3 August 2026.

Fabien Reboul (born 9 September 1995) is a French professional tennis player who specializes in doubles. He has a career high ATP doubles ranking of world No. 20 achieved on 3 August 2026 and a career high ATP singles ranking of No. 328 achieved on 17 December 2018. Reboul has won five ATP Tour and 17 ATP Challenger Tour doubles titles, all partnering Sadio Doumbia.

== Career ==
=== 2022: ATP debut ===
Reboul and Sadio Doumbia received a wildcard invitation into the main draw of their home tournament at the 2022 Rolex Paris Masters making their debut at the Masters 1000 level.

=== 2023: ATP title, Masters semifinal, top 50 ===
The pair Reboul and Doumbia reached their first ATP final at the 2023 Córdoba Open. Reboul reached the top 50 on 13 February 2023. Next they reached the semifinals at the 2023 Rio Open.

In September 2023, Reboul and Doumbia won their first title on the ATP Tour, the 2023 Chengdu Open. The following month, in October the pair reached the semifinals of the 2023 Rolex Shanghai Masters upsetting second seeds Wesley Koolhof and Neal Skupski.

=== 2024: ATP 500 final, Masters quarterfinals ===
The pair of Reboul and Doumbia won their first title of the year at the Open Sud de France in Montpellier, where they defeated their compatriot Albano Olivetti and his partner, Sam Weissborn in the final. They continued their winning streak in to the following week at the Córdoba Open. They lost to the defending champions Máximo González and Andrés Molteni in a rematch of the previous year's final. They then went to win the Arizona Tennis Classic, a 175 Challenger event. The pair reached their third ATP final at the Estoril Open, where lost in the final to Gonzalo Escobar and Aleksandr Nedovyesov in straight sets. The following week, Reboul and Doumbia reached their second consecutive final at the Țiriac Open, winning the title this time. In May 2024 in Hamburg, partnering Édouard Roger-Vasselin, Reboul reached his first final at the 500-level and biggest career final but lost to defending champions Kevin Krawietz and Tim Pütz.

In September at the Chengdu Open, back alongside Doumbia, Reboul defended the title, defeating Yuki Bhambri and Albano Olivetti in the final.

=== 2025: Major quarterfinal, Masters final, top 25, French No. 1 ===
In September, Doumbia and Reboul reached their first Grand Slam quarterfinal at the 2025 US Open. Their furthest run in a major event ended with a loss to Robert Cash and James JJ Tracy. Ranked No. 10 at the end of the year, the pair earned spots as alternates for the 2025 ATP Finals in Turin, Italy.

=== 2026: Major quarterfinals, Top 20 ===
In January, Doumbia and Reboul reached their second consecutive Grand Slam quarterfinal at the 2026 Australian Open in Melbourne. The pair beat Argentinians Tomás Martín Etcheverry and Camilo Ugo Carabelli in three sets.

== Performance timeline ==
Key
| W | F | SF | QF | #R | RR | Q# | DNQ | A | NH |

(W) winner; (F) finalist; (SF) semifinalist; (QF) quarterfinalist; (#R) rounds 4, 3, 2, 1; (RR) round-robin stage; (Q#) qualification round; (DNQ) did not qualify; (A) absent; (NH) not held; (SR) strike rate (events won / competed); (W–L) win–loss record.

=== Doubles ===
| Tournament | 2022 | 2023 | 2024 | 2025 | 2026 | SR | W–L | Win% |
|---|---|---|---|---|---|---|---|---|
Grand Slam tournaments
| Australian Open | A | 2R | 1R | 3R | QF | 0 / 4 | 6–4 | 60% |
| French Open | 2R | 3R | 1R | 2R | 1R | 0 / 5 | 4–5 | 44% |
| Wimbledon | 1R | 2R | 3R | 2R | QF | 0 / 5 | 7–5 | 58% |
| US Open | 2R | 1R | A | QF | | 0 / 3 | 4–3 | 57% |
| Win–loss | 2–3 | 4–4 | 2–3 | 7–4 | 6–3 | 0 / 17 | 21–17 | 55% |
ATP Masters 1000
| Indian Wells Masters | A | A | 1R | 1R | 1R | 0 / 3 | 1–3 | 25% |
| Miami Open | A | 1R | 1R | 1R | 1R | 0 / 4 | 1–4 | 20% |
| Monte Carlo Masters | A | A | A | 2R | 1R | 0 / 2 | 1–2 | 33% |
| Madrid Open | A | A | QF | 1R | QF | 0 / 3 | 4–3 | 57% |
| Italian Open | A | A | A | F | QF | 0 / 2 | 6–2 | 80% |
| Canadian Open | A | 2R | A | 1R | | 0 / 2 | 1–2 | 33% |
| Cincinnati Masters | A | A | A | A | | 0 / 0 | 0–0 | – |
| Shanghai Masters | NH | SF | 1R | 1R | | 0 / 3 | 3–3 | 0% |
| Paris Masters | 2R | 2R | QF | 1R | | 0 / 4 | 4–4 | 50% |
| Win–loss | 1–1 | 5–4 | 4–5 | 5–8 | 6–5 | 0 / 23 | 21–23 | 48% |
Career statistics
| Titles | 0 | 1 | 3 | 1 | 2 | 7 | | |
| Finals | 0 | 2 | 6 | 3 | 3 | 14 | | |
| Overall Win–Loss | 10–13 | 33–25 | 38–23 | 34–31 | 31–16 | 130–97 | | |
| Win (%) | 43% | 57% | 62% | 52% | 66% | 57% | | |
| Year-end ranking | 53 | 36 | 28 | 31 | | $1,786,990 | | |

== Significant finals ==
=== Masters 1000 finals ===
==== Doubles: 1 (1 runner-up) ====
| Outcome | Year | Championship | Surface | Partner | Opponents | Score |
|---|---|---|---|---|---|---|
| Loss | 2025 | Italian Open | Clay | (France) Sadio Doumbia | (El Salvador) Marcelo Arévalo (Croatia) Mate Pavić | 4–6, 7–6^{(8–6)}, [11–13] |

== ATP career finals ==
=== Doubles: 14 (7 titles, 7 runners-up) ===
| Legend Grand Slams (0–0) ATP Finals (0–0) ATP Masters 1000 (0–1) ATP 500 (0–3) ATP 250 (7–3) | Titles by surface Hard (3–1) Clay (4–6) Grass (0–0) |

| Result | W–L | Date | Tournament | Tier | Surface | Partner | Opponents | Score |
|---|---|---|---|---|---|---|---|---|
| Loss | 0–1 | Feb 2023 | Córdoba Open, Argentina | ATP 250 | Clay | (France) Sadio Doumbia | (Argentina) Máximo González (Argentina) Andrés Molteni | 4–6, 4–6 |
| Win | 1–1 | Sep 2023 | Chengdu Open, China | ATP 250 | Hard | (France) Sadio Doumbia | (Portugal) Francisco Cabral (Brazil) Rafael Matos | 4–6, 7–5, [10–7] |
| Win | 2–1 | Jan 2024 | Open Sud de France, France | ATP 250 | Hard | (France) Sadio Doumbia | (France) Albano Olivetti (Austria) Sam Weissborn | 6–7^{(5–7)}, 6–4, [10–6] |
| Loss | 2–2 | Feb 2024 | Córdoba Open, Argentina | ATP 250 | Clay | (France) Sadio Doumbia | (Argentina) Máximo González (Argentina) Andrés Molteni | 4–6, 1–6 |
| Loss | 2–3 | Apr 2024 | Estoril Open, Portugal | ATP 250 | Clay | (France) Sadio Doumbia | (Ecuador) Gonzalo Escobar (Kazakhstan) Aleksandr Nedovyesov | 5–7, 2–6 |
| Win | 3–3 | Apr 2024 | Țiriac Open, Romania | ATP 250 | Clay | (France) Sadio Doumbia | (Finland) Harri Heliövaara (United Kingdom) Henry Patten | 6–3, 7–5 |
| Loss | 3–4 | Jul 2024 | Hamburg Open, Germany | ATP 500 | Clay | (France) Édouard Roger-Vasselin | (Germany) Kevin Krawietz (Germany) Tim Pütz | 6–7^{(8–10)}, 2–6 |
| Win | 4–4 | Sep 2024 | Chengdu Open, China | ATP 250 | Hard | (France) Sadio Doumbia | (India) Yuki Bhambri (France) Albano Olivetti | 6–4, 4–6, [10–4] |
| Loss | 4–5 | Feb 2025 | Mexican Open, Mexico | ATP 500 | Hard | (France) Sadio Doumbia | (United States) Evan King (United States) Christian Harrison | 4–6, 0–6 |
| Loss | 4–6 | May 2025 | Italian Open, Italy | Masters 1000 | Clay | (France) Sadio Doumbia | (El Salvador) Marcelo Arévalo (Croatia) Mate Pavić | 4–6, 7–6^{(8–6)}, [11–13] |
| Win | 5–6 | May 2025 | Geneva Open, Switzerland | ATP 250 | Clay | (France) Sadio Doumbia | (Uruguay) Ariel Behar (Belgium) Joran Vliegen | 6–7^{(4–7)}, 6–4, [11–9] |
| Win | 6–6 | Apr 2026 | Țiriac Open, Romania (2) | ATP 250 | Clay | (France) Sadio Doumbia | (Czech Republic) Adam Pavlásek (Czech Republic) Patrik Rikl | 6–1, 6–4 |
| Loss | 6–7 | May 2026 | Hamburg Open, Germany | ATP 500 | Clay | (France) Sadio Doumbia | (Germany) Kevin Krawietz (Germany) Tim Pütz | 3–6, 6–4, [8–10] |
| Win | 7–7 | Jul 2026 | Swedish Open, Sweden | ATP 250 | Clay | (France) Sadio Doumbia | (France) Théo Arribagé (Portugal) Francisco Cabral | 6–3, 6–4 |

== ATP Challenger and ITF Futures finals ==
=== Singles: 10 (3–7) ===
| Legend ATP Challenger (0–0) ITF Futures (3–7) | Finals by surface Hard (2–3) Clay (1–4) Grass (0–0) Carpet (0–0) |

| Result | W–L | Date | Tournament | Tier | Surface | Opponent | Score |
|---|---|---|---|---|---|---|---|
| Loss | 0–1 | Mar 2015 | France F5, Toulouse] | Futures | Hard | (Russia) Karen Khachanov | 4–6, 1–6 |
| Win | 1–1 | Dec 2016 | Thailand F4, Hua Hin | Futures | Hard | (France) Sadio Doumbia | 6–7^{(3–7)}, 6–2, 7–6^{(7–5)} |
| Loss | 1–2 | Jan 2017 | Thailand F6, Hua Hin | Futures | Hard | (Kazakhstan) Dmitry Popko | 4–6, 2–6 |
| Loss | 1–3 | Mar 2017 | France F5, Toulouse | Futures | Hard | (France) David Guez | 3–6, 4–6 |
| Win | 2–3 | Jul 2017 | France F13, Montauban | Futures | Clay | (Sweden) Christian Lindell | 4–6, 6–4, 7–6^{(7–5)} |
| Win | 3–3 | Feb 2018 | Great Britain F3, Shrewsbury | Futures | Hard | (Austria) Maximilian Neuchrist | 6–4, 3–6, 7–6^{(7–3)} |
| Loss | 3–4 | Jun 2018 | France F10, Toulouse | Futures | Clay | (Russia) Alen Avidzba | 6–7^{(6–8)}, 3–6 |
| Loss | 3–5 | Jul 2018 | France F15, Troyes | Futures | Clay | (Brazil) Bruno Sant'Anna | 2–6, 4–6 |
| Loss | 3–6 | Aug 2018 | Italy F22, Compiano | Futures | Clay | (Italy) Pietro Rondoni | 3–6, 6–3, 0–6 |
| Loss | 3–7 | Oct 2018 | Lebanon F2, Jounieh | Futures | Clay | (France) Alexandre Müller | 7–6^{(7–2)}, 3–6, 4–6 |

=== Doubles: 58 (41–17) ===
| Legend ATP Challenger (17–9) ITF Futures (24–8) | Finals by surface Hard (18–5) Clay (23–12) |

| Result | W–L | Date | Tournament | Tier | Surface | Partner | Opponents | Score |
|---|---|---|---|---|---|---|---|---|
| Loss | 0–1 | Nov 2013 | Greece F17, Heraklion | Futures | Hard | (France) Paul Cayre | (Serbia) Miki Janković (Slovenia) Tom Kočevar-Dešman | 4–6, 0–6 |
| Loss | 0–2 | Aug 2014 | Finland F2, Hyvinkaa | Futures | Clay | (France) Paul Cayre | (Sweden) Jesper Brunstrom (Sweden) Patrik Rosenholm | 2–6, 3–6 |
| Loss | 0–3 | May 2015 | Turkey F18, Antalya | Futures | Hard | (France) Benjamin Bonzi | (Austria) Maximilian Neuchrist (Austria) Lucas Miedler | 2–6, 3–6 |
| Win | 1–3 | May 2015 | Algeria F3, Annaba | Futures | Clay | (France) Sadio Doumbia | (Brazil) Rafael Camilo (Spain) Adria Mas Mascolo | 6–3, 7–6^{(7–5)} |
| Win | 2–3 | Jul 2015 | France F13, Bourg-en-Bresse | Futures | Clay | (France) Maxime Teixeira | (France) Gianni Mina (France) Elie Rousset | 7–6^{(7–5)}, 4–6, [10–8] |
| Win | 3–3 | Jul 2015 | France F15, Troyes | Futures | Clay | (Switzerland) Loic Perret | (France) Julien Demois (France) Yanais Laurent | 4–6, 6–2, [10–7] |
| Win | 4–3 | Oct 2015 | Tunisia F26, El Kantaoui | Futures | Hard | (France) Benjamin Bonzi | (Lithuania) Lukas Mugevicius (Spain) Roberto Ortega Olmedo | 4–6, 6–4, [10–8] |
| Win | 5–3 | Oct 2015 | Tunisia F27, El Kantaoui | Futures | Hard | (France) Benjamin Bonzi | (Tunisia) Anis Ghorbel (Tunisia) Aziz Dougaz | 6–2, 6–2 |
| Win | 6–3 | Oct 2015 | France F23, Rodez | Futures | Hard | (Canada) Filip Peliwo | (France) Jonathan Eysseric (France) Tom Jomby | 6–7^{(2–7)}, 6–4, [10–4] |
| Win | 7–3 | Feb 2016 | Israel F1, Tel Aviv | Futures | Hard | (France) Laurent Lokoli | (Germany) Peter Heller (Spain) Jaime Pulgar-Garcia | 6–3, 7–5 |
| Win | 8–3 | Mar 2016 | France F5, Toulouse | Futures | Hard | (France) Benjamin Bonzi | (Canada) Martin Beran (France) Maxime Tabatruong | 7–5, 6–3 |
| Win | 9–3 | May 2016 | Algeria F1, Oran | Futures | Clay | (France) Alexandre Müller | (Spain) Pol Toledo Bagué (Spain) Adria Mas Mascolo | 6–4, 6–4 |
| Loss | 9–4 | May 2016 | Algeria F2, Algiers | Futures | Clay | (Venezuela) Jordi Muñoz Abreu | (France) Grégoire Jacq (France) Alexandre Müller | 4–6, 3–6 |
| Win | 10–4 | May 2016 | Algeria F3, Algiers | Futures | Clay | (Venezuela) Jordi Muñoz Abreu | (France) Grégoire Jacq (France) Jonathan Kanar | 6–4, 7–6^{(7–4)} |
| Win | 11–4 | Aug 2016 | Switzerland F3, Collonge-Bellerive | Futures | Clay | (Portugal) Gonçalo Oliveira | (Switzerland) Antoine Bellier (France) Hugo Nys | 6–3, 7–5 |
| Win | 12–4 | Aug 2016 | Switzerland F4, Lausanne | Futures | Clay | (Portugal) Gonçalo Oliveira | (Switzerland) Louroi Martinez (Argentina) Federico Coria | 7–5, 6–2 |
| Win | 13–4 | Sep 2016 | Switzerland F5, Sion | Futures | Clay | (Portugal) Gonçalo Oliveira | (Switzerland) Louroi Martinez (Argentina) Federico Coria | 6–3, 6–3 |
| Loss | 13–5 | Sep 2016 | Tunisia F22, Hammamet | Futures | Clay | (France) Benjamin Bonzi | (Argentina) Mariano Kestelboim (Argentina) Franco Agamenone | 2–6, 6–2, [7–10] |
| Win | 14–5 | Sep 2016 | Tunisia F23, Hammamet | Futures | Clay | (France) Benjamin Bonzi | (Argentina) Mariano Kestelboim (Argentina) Franco Agamenone | 2–6, 7–5, [10–4] |
| Win | 15–5 | Dec 2016 | Thailand F5, Hua Hin | Futures | Hard | (France) Sadio Doumbia | (South Korea) Soonwoo Kwon (South Korea) Lee Jea Moon | 6–3, 6–4 |
| Loss | 15–6 | Jan 2017 | Bangkok, Thailand | Challenger | Hard | (France) Sadio Doumbia | (Thailand) Sonchat Ratiwatana (Thailand) Sanchai Ratiwatana | 6–7^{(4–7)}, 5–7 |
| Win | 16–6 | Mar 2017 | France F5, Toulouse | Futures | Hard | (United States) Thai-Son Kwiatkowski | (Belgium) Niels Desein (France) Yannick Jankovits | 6–3, 7–6^{(7–4)} |
| Win | 17–6 | Sep 2017 | Egypt F24, Cairo | Futures | Clay | (France) Johan Sebastien Tatlot | (Brazil) Fernando Romboli (Italy) Fabrizio Ornago | 6–4, 6–4 |
| Win | 18–6 | Jan 2018 | France F2, Bressuire | Futures | Hard | (France) Sadio Doumbia | (France) Sebastien Boltz (Italy) Erik Crepaldi | 6–3, 7–5 |
| Loss | 18–7 | Aug 2018 | Hungary F6, Győr | Futures | Clay | (France) Sadio Doumbia | (Ukraine) Danylo Kalenichenko (Slovakia) Filip Polášek | 4–6, 6–3, [17–19] |
| Win | 19–7 | Oct 2018 | Lebanon F2, Jounieh | Futures | Clay | (France) Sadio Doumbia | (Brazil) Wilson Leite (Italy) Nicolo Turchetti | 4–6, 6–2, [10–4] |
| Win | 20–7 | Apr 2019 | M25+H Abuja, Nigeria | World Tennis Tour | Hard | (France) Sadio Doumbia | (Zimbabwe) Benjamin Lock (Zimbabwe) Courtney John Lock | 6–7^{(5–7)}, 6–3, [10–7] |
| Win | 21–7 | Apr 2019 | M25+H Abuja, Nigeria | World Tennis Tour | Hard | (France) Sadio Doumbia | (France) Dan Added (Greece) Michail Pervolarakis | 6–4, 5–7, [10–6] |
| Loss | 21–8 | Jul 2019 | M25 Bourg-en-Bresse, France | World Tennis Tour | Clay | (France) Sadio Doumbia | (France) Arthur Reymond (France) Matteo Martineau | 1–6, 6–7^{(4–7)} |
| Loss | 21–9 | Jul 2019 | M25+H Kassel, Germany | World Tennis Tour | Clay | (France) Sadio Doumbia | (Germany) Mats Rosenkranz (Australia) James Frawley | 5–7, 6–7^{(10–12)} |
| Loss | 21–10 | Aug 2019 | Manerbio, Italy | Challenger | Clay | (France) Sadio Doumbia | (Brazil) Fernando Romboli (Brazil) Fabrício Neis | 4–6, 6–7^{(4–7)} |
| Win | 22–10 | Sep 2019 | M25 Trieste, France | World Tennis Tour | Clay | (France) Sadio Doumbia | (Italy) Davide Galoppini (Italy) Pietro Rondoni | 6–3, 6–2 |
| Win | 23–10 | Sep 2019 | Banja Luka, Bosnia & Herzegovina | Challenger | Clay | (France) Sadio Doumbia | (Argentina) Facundo Mena (Peru) Sergio Galdós | 6–3, 7–6^{(7–4)} |
| Win | 24–10 | Sep 2019 | Romania, Romania | Challenger | Clay | (France) Sadio Doumbia | (Croatia) Ivan Sabanov (Croatia) Matej Sabanov | 6–4, 3–6, [10–7] |
| Win | 25–10 | Oct 2020 | M25+H Rodez, France | World Tennis Tour | Hard | (France) Sadio Doumbia | (Netherlands) Igor Sijsling (Netherlands) Glenn Smits | 6–3, 7–5 |
| Loss | 25–11 | Nov 2020 | Parma, Italy | Challenger | Hard | (France) Sadio Doumbia | (France) Albano Olivetti (France) Grégoire Barrère | 2–6, 4–6 |
| Win | 26–11 | Dec 2020 | Campinas, Brazil | Challenger | Clay | (France) Sadio Doumbia | (Venezuela) Luis David Martinez (Brazil) Felipe Meligeni Alves | 6–7^{(7–9)}, 7–5, [10–7] |
| Win | 27–11 | Jan 2021 | M15 Manacor, Spain | World Tennis Tour | Hard | (France) Sadio Doumbia | (France) Dan Added (Switzerland) Antoine Bellier | 7–6^{(7–1)}, 6–1 |
| Win | 28–11 | Apr 2021 | Rome, Italy | Challenger | Clay | (France) Sadio Doumbia | (Italy) Paolo Lorenzi (Peru) Juan Pablo Varillas | 7–6^{(7–5)}, 7–5 |
| Win | 29–11 | May 2021 | Rome 2, Italy | Challenger | Clay | (France) Sadio Doumbia | (Argentina) Guillermo Durán (Argentina) Guido Andreozzi | 7–5, 6–3 |
| Loss | 29–12 | May 2021 | Oeiras 3, Portugal | Challenger | Clay | (France) Sadio Doumbia | (United States) Hunter Reese (Netherlands) Sem Verbeek | 6–4, 4–6, [7–10] |
| Win | 30–12 | June 2021 | Aix-en-Provence, France | Challenger | Clay | (France) Sadio Doumbia | (United States) Robert Galloway (United States) Alex Lawson | 6–7^{(4–7)}, 7–5, [10–4] |
| Win | 31–12 | June 2021 | Verona, Italy | Challenger | Clay | (France) Sadio Doumbia | (Switzerland) Luca Margaroli (Portugal) Gonçalo Oliveira | 7–5, 4–6, [10–6] |
| Win | 32–12 | October 2021 | Brest, France | Challenger | Hard (i) | (France) Sadio Doumbia | (Italy) Salvatore Caruso (Italy) Federico Gaio | 4–6, 6–3, [10–3] |
| Win | 33–12 | January 2022 | Forlì, Italy | Challenger | Hard (i) | (France) Sadio Doumbia | (Colombia) Nicolás Mejía (United States) Alexander Ritschard | 6-2, 6-3 |
| Win | 34–12 | February 2022 | Las Palmas, Spain | Challenger | Clay | (France) Sadio Doumbia | (Italy) Matteo Arnaldi (Italy) Luciano Darderi | 5–7, 6–4, [10–7] |
| Loss | 34–13 | April 2022 | Split, Croatia | Challenger | Clay | (France) Sadio Doumbia | (United States) Nathaniel Lammons (France) Albano Olivetti | 6–4, 6–7^{(6–8)}, [7–10] |
| Loss | 34–14 | April 2022 | Rome, Italy | Challenger | Clay | (France) Sadio Doumbia | (Netherlands) Jesper de Jong (Netherlands) Bart Stevens | 6–3, 5–7, [8–10] |
| Loss | 34–15 | May 2022 | Forlì, Italy | Challenger | Clay | (France) Sadio Doumbia | (Colombia) Nicolás Barrientos (Mexico) Miguel Ángel Reyes-Varela | 5–7, 6–4, [4–10] |
| Win | 35–15 | June 2022 | Perugia, Italy | Challenger | Clay | (France) Sadio Doumbia | (Italy) Marco Bortolotti (Spain) Sergio Martos Gornés | 6-2, 6-4 |
| Win | 36–15 | June 2022 | Oeiras, Portugal | Challenger | Clay | (France) Sadio Doumbia | (United States) Robert Galloway (United States) Alex Lawson | 6–3, 3–6, [15–13] |
| Loss | 36–16 | Aug 2022 | Grodzisk Mazowiecki, Poland | Challenger | Hard | (Monaco) Hugo Nys | (Netherlands) Robin Haase (Austria) Philipp Oswald | 3–6, 4–6 |
| Win | 37–16 | Nov 2022 | Roanne, France | Challenger | Hard (i) | (France) Sadio Doumbia | (Jamaica) Dustin Brown (Poland) Szymon Walków | 7–6^{(7–5)}, 6–4 |
| Win | 38–16 | Jan 2023 | Quimper, France | Challenger | Hard (i) | (France) Sadio Doumbia | (India) Anirudh Chandrasekar (India) Arjun Kadhe | 6–2, 6–4 |
| Win | 39–16 | Apr 2023 | Split, Croatia | Challenger | Clay | (France) Sadio Doumbia | (India) Anirudh Chandrasekar (India) Vijay Sundar Prashanth | 6–4, 6–4 |
| Loss | 39–17 | May 2023 | Bordeaux, France | Challenger | Clay | (France) Sadio Doumbia | (United Kingdom) Lloyd Glasspool (Finland) Harri Heliövaara | 4–6, 2–6 |
| Win | 40–17 | Mar 2024 | Phoenix, USA | Challenger | Hard | (France) Sadio Doumbia | (Australia) Rinky Hijikata (United Kingdom) Henry Patten | 6–3, 6–2 |
| Win | 41–17 | Jan 2025 | Quimper, France | Challenger | Hard (i) | (France) Sadio Doumbia | (France) Manuel Guinard (Monaco) Romain Arneodo | 6–2, 4–6, [10–3] |
