= Sadio Doumbia =

French tennis player (born 1990)

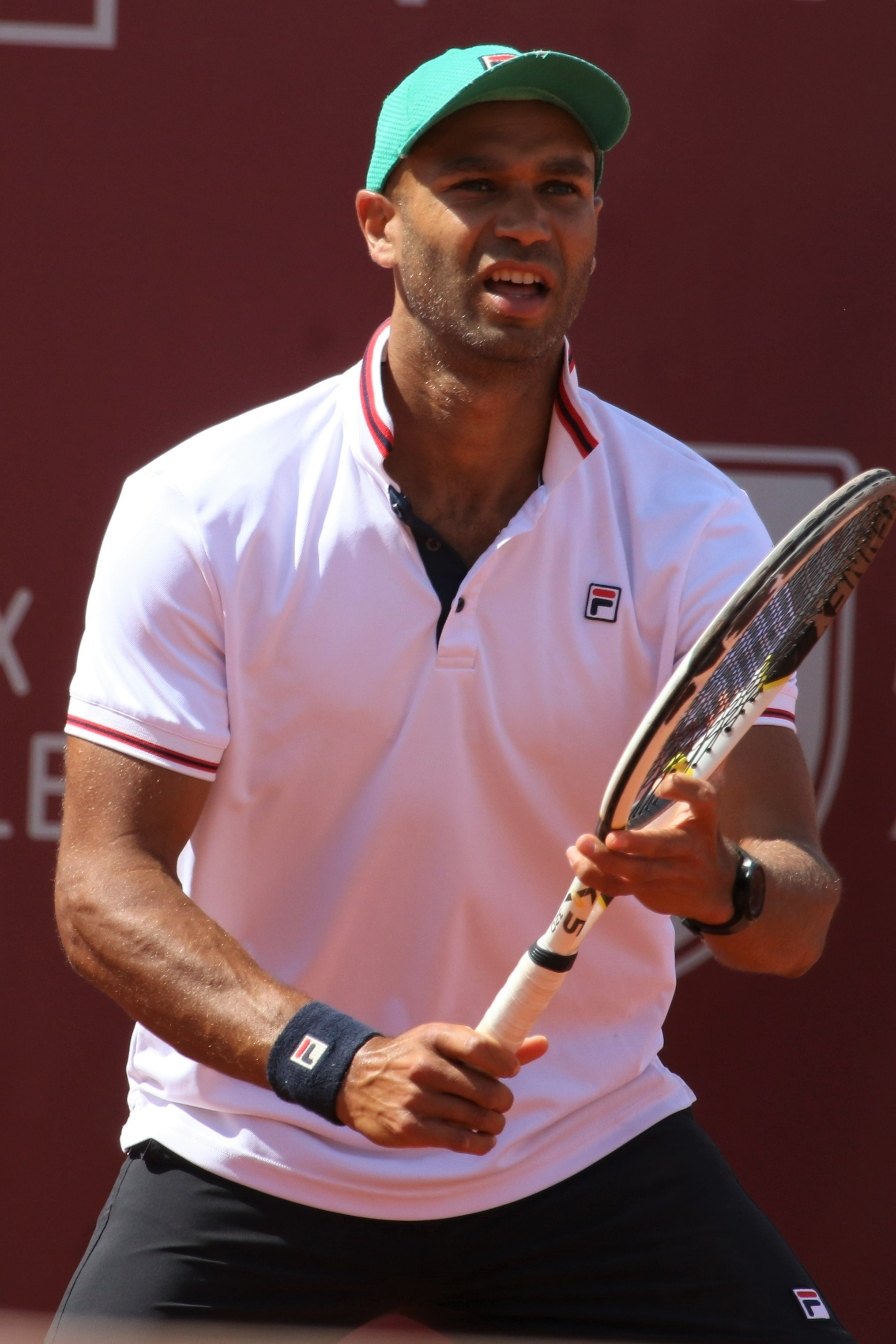
- Doumbia at the 2022 BNP Paribas Primrose Bordeaux
- Country (sports): France
- Residence: Toulouse, France
- Born: 12 September 1990 (age 36) Toulouse, France
- Height: 1.85 m (6 ft 1 in)
- Plays: Right-handed (one-handed backhand)
- College: University of Georgia, AUM
- Coach: Boubacar Doumbia
- Prize money: $1,954,193

Singles
- Career record: 0–0
- Highest ranking: No. 250 (7 November 2016)

Doubles
- Career record: 134–112
- Career titles: 7
- Highest ranking: No. 21 (4 May 2026)
- Current ranking: No. 21 (3 August 2026)

Grand Slam doubles results
- Australian Open: QF (2026)
- French Open: 3R (2023)
- Wimbledon: QF (2026)
- US Open: QF (2025)

Grand Slam mixed doubles results
- French Open: 1R (2026)
- Wimbledon: 1R (2025)
- US Open: 1R (2024)
- Last updated on: 28 October 2026.

Sadio Doumbia (born 12 September 1990) is a French professional tennis player who specializes in doubles. He has a career high ATP doubles ranking of No. 21 achieved on 4 May 2026 and a career-high ATP singles ranking of No. 250 achieved on 7 November 2016. Doumbia has won seven ATP Tour doubles titles with compatriot Fabien Reboul and 18 on the ATP Challenger Tour, 17 of them with Reboul.

== Career ==
=== 2016-2022: Maiden Challenger singles title, ATP doubles debut ===
Doumbia won his maiden ATP Challenger singles titles at the 2016 KPIT MSLTA Challenger in Pune, India.

Doumbia and Fabien Reboul received a wildcard invitation into the main draw of their home tournament at the 2022 Rolex Paris Masters, making their debut at the Masters 1000 level.

=== 2023: Maiden ATP title, top 50 ===
The pair Doumbia and Reboul reached their first ATP final at the 2023 Córdoba Open. Doumbia reached the top 50 after a semifinal showing at the 2023 Rio Open with Reboul on 27 February 2023.

In September, Doumbia and Reboul won their first title on the ATP Tour, the 2023 Chengdu Open. The following month, in October the pair reached the semifinals of the 2023 Rolex Shanghai Masters upsetting second seeds Wesley Koolhof and Neal Skupski.

=== 2024: ATP 500 final, Masters quarterfinals ===
The pair of Reboul and Doumbia won their first title of the year at the Open Sud de France in Montpellier, where they defeated their compatriot Albano Olivetti and his partner, Sam Weissborn in the final. They continued their winning streak in to the following week at the Córdoba Open. They lost to the defending champions Máximo González and Andrés Molteni in a rematch of the previous year's final. They then went to win the Arizona Tennis Classic, a 175 Challenger event. The pair reached their third ATP final at the Estoril Open, where lost in the final to Gonzalo Escobar and Aleksandr Nedovyesov in straight sets. The following week, Reboul and Doumbia reached their second consecutive final at the Țiriac Open, winning the title this time.

In September, Doumbia and Reboul successfully defended their title at the Chengdu Open, defeating Yuki Bhambri and Albano Olivetti in the final.

=== 2025: Major quarterfinal, Masters final, top 30, French No. 2 ===
In September, Doumbia and Reboul reached their first Grand Slam quarterfinal at the 2025 US Open. Their furthest run in a major event ended with a loss to Robert Cash and James JJ Tracy. Ranked No. 10 at the end of the year, the pair earned spots as alternates for the Nitto 2025 ATP Finals in Turin, Italy.

=== 2026: Major quarterfinals, Top 25 ===
In January, Doumbia and Reboul reached their second consecutive Grand Slam quarterfinal at the 2026 Australian Open in Melbourne. The pair beat Argentinians Tomás Martín Etcheverry and Camilo Ugo Carabelli in three sets.

== Significant finals ==
=== Masters 1000 finals ===
==== Doubles: 1 (1 runner-up) ====
Outcome	Year	Championship	Surface	Partner	Opponents	Score
Loss	2025	Italian Open	Clay	(France) Fabien Reboul	(El Salvador) Marcelo Arévalo (Croatia) Mate Pavić	4–6, 7–6^{(8–6)}, [11–13]

== ATP career finals ==
=== Doubles: 14 (7 titles, 7 runners-up) ===
Legend Grand Slams (0–0) ATP Finals (0–0) ATP Masters 1000 (0–1) ATP 500 (0–2) ATP 250 (7–4)	Titles by surface Hard (3–2) Clay (4–5) Grass (0–0) Carpet (0–0)

Result	W–L	Date	Tournament	Tier	Surface	Partner	Opponents	Score
Loss	0–1	Feb 2023	Córdoba Open, Argentina	ATP 250	Clay	(France) Fabien Reboul	(Argentina) Máximo González (Argentina) Andrés Molteni	4–6, 4–6
Win	1–1	Sep 2023	Chengdu Open, China	ATP 250	Hard	(France) Fabien Reboul	(Portugal) Francisco Cabral (Brazil) Rafael Matos	4–6, 7–5, [10–7]
Win	2–1	Jan 2024	Open Sud de France, France	ATP 250	Hard	(France) Fabien Reboul	(France) Albano Olivetti (Austria) Sam Weissborn	6–7^{(5–7)}, 6–4, [10–6]
Loss	2–2	Feb 2024	Córdoba Open, Argentina	ATP 250	Clay	(France) Fabien Reboul	(Argentina) Máximo González (Argentina) Andrés Molteni	4–6, 1–6
Loss	2–3	Apr 2024	Estoril Open, Portugal	ATP 250	Clay	(France) Fabien Reboul	(Ecuador) Gonzalo Escobar (Kazakhstan) Aleksandr Nedovyesov	5–7, 2–6
Win	3–3	Apr 2024	Țiriac Open, Romania	ATP 250	Clay	(France) Fabien Reboul	(Finland) Harri Heliövaara (United Kingdom) Henry Patten	6–3, 7–5
Win	4–3	Sep 2024	Chengdu Open, China	ATP 250	Hard	(France) Fabien Reboul	(India) Yuki Bhambri (France) Albano Olivetti	6–4, 4–6, [10–4]
Loss	4–4	Feb 2025	Mexican Open, Mexico	ATP 500	Hard	(France) Fabien Reboul	(United States) Evan King (United States) Christian Harrison	4–6, 0–6
Loss	4–5	May 2025	Italian Open, Italy	Masters 1000	Clay	(France) Fabien Reboul	(El Salvador) Marcelo Arévalo (Croatia) Mate Pavić	4–6, 7–6^{(8–6)}, [11–13]
Win	5–5	May 2025	Geneva Open, Switzerland	ATP 250	Clay	(France) Fabien Reboul	(Uruguay) Ariel Behar (Belgium) Joran Vliegen	6–7^{(4–7)}, 6–4, [11–9]
Win	6–5	Apr 2026	Țiriac Open, Romania (2)	ATP 250	Clay	(France) Fabien Reboul	(Czech Republic) Adam Pavlásek (Czech Republic) Patrik Rikl	6–1, 6–4
Loss	6–6	May 2026	Hamburg Open, Germany	ATP 500	Clay	(France) Fabien Reboul	(Germany) Kevin Krawietz (Germany) Tim Pütz	3–6, 6–4, [8–10]
Win	7–6	Jul 2026	Swedish Open, Sweden	ATP 250	Clay	(France) Fabien Reboul	(France) Théo Arribagé (Portugal) Francisco Cabral	6–3, 6–4
Loss	7–7	Oct 2026	European Open, Belgium	ATP 250	Hard (i)	(Netherlands) Bart Stevens	(Germany) Constantin Frantzen (United States) Robert Galloway	7–6^{(7–4)}, 4–6, [8–10]

== ATP Challenger titles ==
=== Singles ===
Legend
ATP Challenger (1)

Result	Date	Category	Tournament	Surface	Opponent	Score
Winner	29 October 2016	Challenger	Pune, India	Hard	(India) Prajnesh Gunneswaran	4–6, 6–4, 6–3

=== Doubles ===
Legend
ATP Challenger (19)

Result	Date	Category	Tournament	Surface	Partner	Opponents	Score
Win	3 September 2016	Challenger	Istanbul, Turkey	Hard	(France) Calvin Hemery	(Switzerland) Marco Chiudinelli (Romania) Marius Copil	6–4, 6–3
Win	14 September 2019	Challenger	Banja Luka, Bosnia and Herzegovina	Clay	(France) Fabien Reboul	(Peru) Sergio Galdós (Argentina) Facundo Mena	6–3, 7–6^{(7–4)}
Win	22 September 2019	Challenger	Sibiu, Romania	Clay	(France) Fabien Reboul	(Croatia) Matej Sabanov (Croatia) Ivan Sabanov	6–4, 3–6, [10-7]
Win	December 2020	Challenger	Campinas, Brazil	Clay	(France) Fabien Reboul	(Venezuela) Luis David Martinez (Brazil) Felipe Meligeni Alves	6–7^{(7–9)}, 7–5, [10–7]
Win	24 April 2021	Challenger	Rome, Italy	Clay	(France) Fabien Reboul	(Italy) Paolo Lorenzi (Peru) Juan Pablo Varillas	7–6^{(7–5)}, 7-5
Win	1 May 2021	Challenger	Rome, Italy	Clay	(France) Fabien Reboul	(Argentina) Guido Andreozzi (Argentina) Guillermo Durán	7–5, 6-3
Win	19 June 2021	Challenger	Aix-en-Provence, France	Clay	(France) Fabien Reboul	(United States) Robert Galloway (United States) Alex Lawson	6–7^{(4–7)}, 7–5, [10–4]
Win	21 August 2021	Challenger	Verona, Italy	Clay	(France) Fabien Reboul	(Switzerland) Luca Margaroli (Portugal) Gonçalo Oliveira	7–5, 4–6, [10–6]
Win	30 October 2021	Challenger	Brest, France	Hard (i)	(France) Fabien Reboul	(Italy) Salvatore Caruso (Italy) Federico Gaio	4–6, 6–3, [10-3]
Win	15 January 2022	Challenger	Forlì, Italy	Hard (i)	(France) Fabien Reboul	(Colombia) Nicolás Mejía (United States) Alexander Ritschard	6–2, 6-3
Win	5 March 2022	Challenger	Las Palmas, Spain	Clay	(France) Fabien Reboul	(Italy) Matteo Arnaldi (Italy) Luciano Darderi	5–7, 6–4, [10–7]
Win	11 June 2022	Challenger	Perugia, Italy	Clay	(France) Fabien Reboul	(Italy) Marco Bortolotti (Spain) Sergio Martos Gornés	6-2, 6-4
Win	25 June 2022	Challenger	Oeiras, Portugal	Clay	(France) Fabien Reboul	(United States) Robert Galloway (United States) Alex Lawson	6–3, 3–6, [15–13]
Win	12 November 2022	Challenger	Roanne, France	Hard (i)	(France) Fabien Reboul	(Jamaica) Dustin Brown (Poland) Szymon Walków	7–6^{(7–5)}, 6–4
Win	29 January 2023	Challenger	Quimper, France	Hard (i)	(France) Fabien Reboul	(India) Anirudh Chandrasekar (India) Arjun Kadhe	6–2, 6–4
Win	15 April 2023	Challenger	Split, Croatia	Clay	(France) Fabien Reboul	(India) Anirudh Chandrasekar (India) Vijay Sundar Prashanth	6–4, 6–4
Win	Mar 2024	Challenger	Phoenix, USA	Hard	(France) Fabien Reboul	(Australia) Rinky Hijikata (United Kingdom) Henry Patten	6–3, 6–2
Win	Jan 2025	Challenger	Quimper, France	Hard (i)	(France) Fabien Reboul	(France) Manuel Guinard (Monaco) Romain Arneodo	6–2, 4–6, [10–3]
Win	Jun 2025	Challenger	Birmingham, Great Britain	Grass	(Brazil) Marcelo Demoliner	(Ecuador) Diego Hidalgo (United States) Patrik Trhac	6–4, 3–6, [10–4]
