= Andrés Molteni =

Argentine tennis player

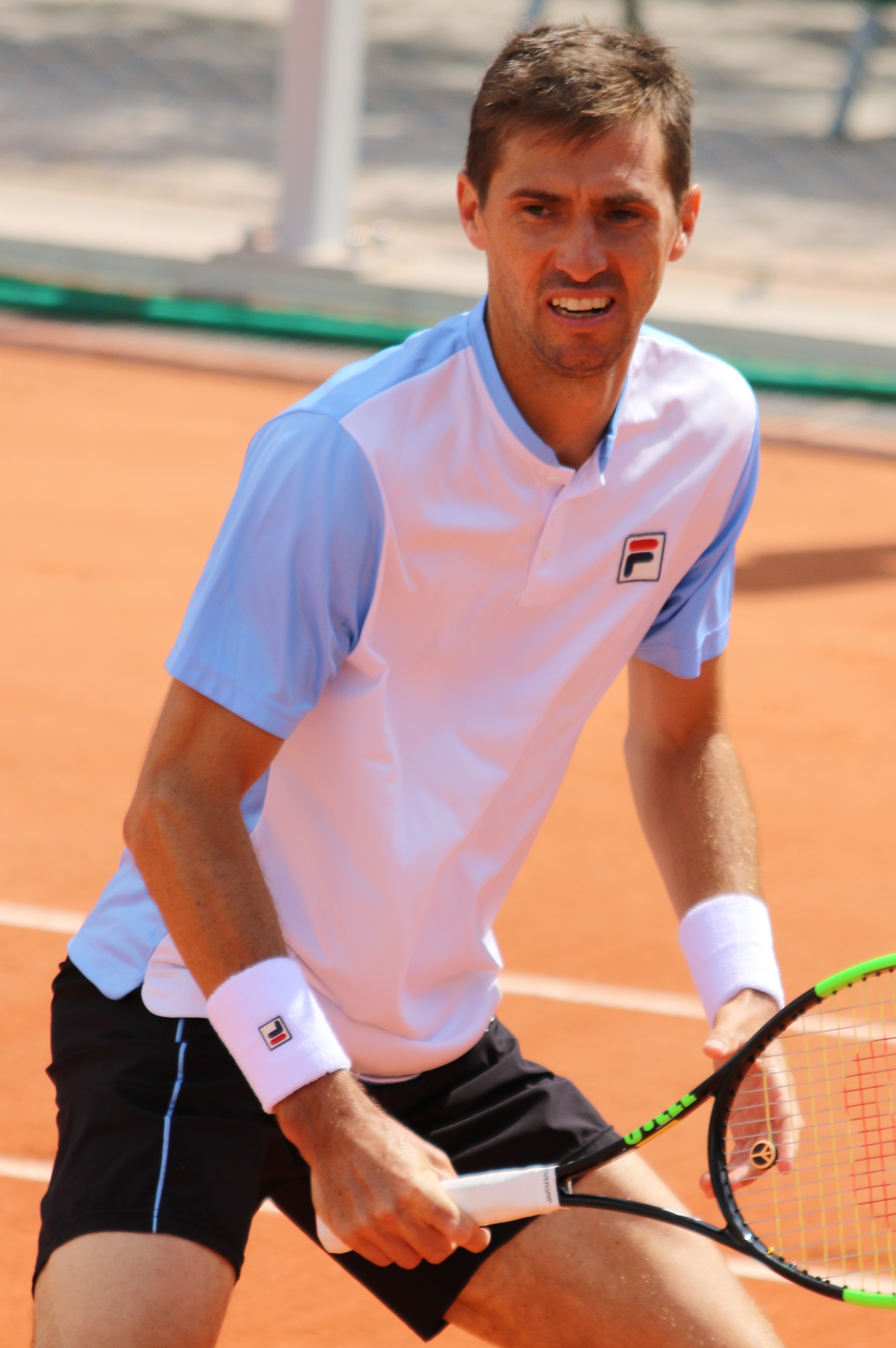
- Molteni at the 2019 French Open
- Country (sports): Argentina
- Born: 15 March 1988 (age 38) Buenos Aires, Argentina
- Height: 1.80 m (5 ft 11 in)
- Turned pro: 2005
- Plays: Right-handed (two-handed backhand)
- Coach: Leonardo Olguín
- Prize money: US $ 2,803,445

Singles
- Career record: 0–2
- Career titles: 0
- Highest ranking: No. 181 (9 May 2011)

Grand Slam singles results
- French Open: Q3 (2014)
- Wimbledon: Q1 (2011)

Doubles
- Career record: 237–197
- Career titles: 18
- Highest ranking: No. 7 (21 August 2023)
- Current ranking: No. 23 (9 June 2025)

Grand Slam doubles results
- Australian Open: QF (2024)
- French Open: QF (2023)
- Wimbledon: QF (2024)
- US Open: QF (2023, 2024)

Other doubles tournaments
- Tour Finals: RR (2023)
- Olympic Games: 1R (2021, 2024)

Mixed doubles
- Career record: 1–11
- Career titles: 0

Grand Slam mixed doubles results
- Australian Open: QF (2025)
- French Open: 1R (2023, 2024, 2025)
- Wimbledon: 2R (2019, 2024, 2025, 2026)
- US Open: 1R (2017, 2023, 2024)
- Last updated on: 16 June 2025.

Andrés Molteni (Spanish pronunciation: [anˈdɾes molˈteni], Italian: [molˈteːni]; born 15 March 1988) is an Argentine professional tennis player who specializes in doubles. He reached his highest ATP doubles ranking of No. 7 on 21 August 2023 and his highest ATP singles ranking of No. 181 in May 2011. He has won 16 doubles ATP titles. He participated in the inaugural 2020 ATP Cup and the 2022 edition as part of Team Argentina.

== Career ==
=== 2011: Maiden singles Challenger ===
He claimed his first Challenger singles title by winning the 2011 Challenger ATP de Salinas Diario Expreso in Salinas, Ecuador where he won against his compatriot Horacio Zeballos 7–5, 7–6^{(4)}.

=== 2021–2022: New partnership with S. González, five more titles, Top 35 ===
In 2021, Molteni won his seventh and eighth ATP 250 doubles titles at the 2021 Astana Open and the 2021 Stockholm Open partnering Santiago González.

In 2022, he won two more clay titles with Santiago González at the 2022 Córdoba Open and 2022 Argentina Open.

He reached a career-high of No. 31 on 21 March 2022 following the Indian Wells Masters where he lost with Diego Schwartzman in the second round to the second-seeded pair of Rajeev Ram and Joe Salisbury.

=== 2023-2024: Masters 1000 & ATP 500 & tenth clay titles, four Major quarterfinals with M. González, World No. 7 ===
Molteni won another clay title at the 2023 Córdoba Open with compatriot Máximo González. It was his third time at this tournament. He won two more ATP 500 titles with Máximo González at the 2023 Rio Open, his first at this level, and at the 2023 Barcelona Open Banc Sabadell. As a result, the pair climbed four spots to fourth in the ATP Live doubles team rankings. Molteni also reached a new career-high ranking in the Top 30 of No. 28 on 24 April 2023.

After winning the biggest title of his career, the Masters 1000 2023 Western & Southern Open with Gonzalez, he reached World No. 7 in the rankings on 21 August 2023. Next, he reached his second Major quarterfinal of the season and in his career at the 2023 US Open with Gonzalez.

At the 2024 US Open, the duo reached the quarterfinals for a second consecutive season with a win over second seeds Rohan Bopanna and Matthew Ebden.

== Significant finals ==
=== Masters 1000 finals ===
==== Doubles: 2 (1 title, 1 runner-up) ====
Outcome	Year	Championship	Surface	Partner	Opponents	Score
Win	2023	Cincinnati Masters	Hard	(Argentina) Máximo González	(United Kingdom) Jamie Murray (New Zealand) Michael Venus	3–6, 6–1, [11–9]
Loss	2024	Shanghai Masters	Hard	(Argentina) Máximo González	(Netherlands) Wesley Koolhof (Croatia) Nikola Mektić	4–6, 4–6

== ATP career finals ==
=== Doubles: 28 (18 titles, 10 runner-ups) ===
Legend Grand Slam Tournaments (0–0) ATP World Tour Finals (0–0) ATP World Tour Masters 1000 (1–1) ATP World Tour 500 Series (4–2) ATP World Tour 250 Series (13–7)	Titles by surface Hard (6–5) Clay (12–5) Grass (0–0)	Titles by setting Outdoor (15–7) Indoor (3–3)

Result	W–L	Date	Tournament	Tier	Surface	Partner	Opponents	Score
Loss	0–1	May 2016	Istanbul Open, Turkey	250 Series	Clay	(Argentina) Diego Schwartzman	(Italy) Flavio Cipolla (Israel) Dudi Sela	3–6, 7–5, [7–10]
Win	1–1	Aug 2016	Atlanta Open, United States	250 Series	Hard	(Argentina) Horacio Zeballos	(Sweden) Johan Brunström (Sweden) Andreas Siljeström	7–6^{(7–2)}, 6–4
Win	2–1	May 2017	Lyon Open, France	250 Series	Clay	(Canada) Adil Shamasdin	(New Zealand) Marcus Daniell (Brazil) Marcelo Demoliner	6–3, 3–6, [10–5]
Win	3–1	Jul 2017	Croatia Open, Croatia	250 Series	Clay	(Argentina) Guillermo Durán	(Croatia) Marin Draganja (Croatia) Tomislav Draganja	6–3, 6–7^{(4–7)}, [10–6]
Win	4–1	Feb 2018	Argentina Open, Argentina	250 Series	Clay	(Argentina) Horacio Zeballos	(Colombia) Juan Sebastián Cabal (Colombia) Robert Farah	6–3, 5–7, [10–3]
Loss	4–2	Apr 2018	Hungarian Open, Hungary	250 Series	Clay	(Netherlands) Matwé Middelkoop	(United Kingdom) Dominic Inglot (Croatia) Franko Škugor	7–6^{(10–8)}, 1–6, [8–10]
Win	5–2	Aug 2018	Austrian Open Kitzbühel, Austria	250 Series	Clay	(Czech Republic) Roman Jebavý	(Italy) Daniele Bracciali (Argentina) Federico Delbonis	6–2, 6–4
Win	6–2	Feb 2019	Córdoba Open, Argentina	250 Series	Clay	(Czech Republic) Roman Jebavý	(Argentina) Máximo González (Argentina) Horacio Zeballos	6–4, 7–6^{(7–4)}
Loss	6–3	Oct 2019	Kremlin Cup, Russia	250 Series	Hard (i)	(Italy) Simone Bolelli	(Brazil) Marcelo Demoliner (Netherlands) Matwé Middelkoop	1–6, 2–6
Loss	6–4	Feb 2020	Córdoba Open, Argentina	250 Series	Clay	(Argentina) Leonardo Mayer	(Brazil) Marcelo Demoliner (Netherlands) Matwé Middelkoop	3–6, 6–7^{(4–7)}
Loss	6–5	Apr 2021	Sardegna Open, Italy	250 Series	Clay	(Italy) Simone Bolelli	(Italy) Lorenzo Sonego (Italy) Andrea Vavassori	3–6, 4–6
Win	7–5	Sep 2021	Astana Open, Kazakhstan	250 Series	Hard (i)	(Mexico) Santiago González	(Israel) Jonathan Erlich (Belarus) Andrei Vasilevski	6–1, 6–2
Win	8–5	Nov 2021	Stockholm Open, Sweden	250 Series	Hard (i)	(Mexico) Santiago González	(Pakistan) Aisam-ul-Haq Qureshi (Netherlands) Jean-Julien Rojer	6–2, 6–2
Win	9–5	Feb 2022	Córdoba Open, Argentina (2)	250 Series	Clay	(Mexico) Santiago González	(Slovakia) Andrej Martin (Austria) Tristan-Samuel Weissborn	7–5, 6–3
Win	10–5	Feb 2022	Argentina Open, Argentina (2)	250 Series	Clay	(Mexico) Santiago González	(Italy) Fabio Fognini (Argentina) Horacio Zeballos	6–1, 6–1
Loss	10–6	Oct 2022	Tel Aviv Open, Israel	250 Series	Hard (i)	(Mexico) Santiago González	(India) Rohan Bopanna (Netherlands) Matwé Middelkoop	2–6, 4–6
Win	11–6	Oct 2022	Gijón Open, Spain	250 Series	Hard (i)	(Argentina) Máximo González	(United States) Nathaniel Lammons (United States) Jackson Withrow	6–7^{(6–8)}, 7–6^{(7–4)}, [10–5]
Loss	11–7	Oct 2022	Vienna Open, Austria	500 Series	Hard (i)	(Mexico) Santiago González	(Austria) Alexander Erler (Austria) Lucas Miedler	3–6, 6–7^{(1–7)}
Win	12–7	Feb 2023	Córdoba Open, Argentina (3)	250 Series	Clay	(Argentina) Máximo González	(France) Sadio Doumbia (France) Fabien Reboul	6–4, 6–4
Win	13–7	Feb 2023	Rio Open, Brazil	500 Series	Clay	(Argentina) Máximo González	(Colombia) Juan Sebastián Cabal (Brazil) Marcelo Melo	6–1, 7–6^{(7–3)}
Win	14–7	Apr 2023	Barcelona Open, Spain	500 Series	Clay	(Argentina) Máximo González	(Netherlands) Wesley Koolhof (United Kingdom) Neal Skupski	6–3, 6–7^{(8–10)}, [10–4]
Win	15–7	Jul 2023	Washington Open, United States	500 Series	Hard	(Argentina) Máximo González	(United States) Mackenzie McDonald (United States) Ben Shelton	6–7^{(4–7)}, 6–2, [10–6]
Win	16–7	Aug 2023	Cincinnati Masters, United States	Masters 1000	Hard	(Argentina) Máximo González	(United Kingdom) Jamie Murray (New Zealand) Michael Venus	3–6, 6–1, [11–9]
Win	17–7	Feb 2024	Córdoba Open, Argentina (4)	250 Series	Clay	(Argentina) Máximo González	(France) Sadio Doumbia (France) Fabien Reboul	6–4, 6–1
Win	18–7	Apr 2024	Barcelona Open, Spain (2)	500 Series	Clay	(Argentina) Máximo González	(Monaco) Hugo Nys (Poland) Jan Zieliński	4–6, 6–4, [11–9]
Loss	18–8	Oct 2024	Shanghai Masters, China	Masters 1000	Hard	(Argentina) Máximo González	(Netherlands) Wesley Koolhof (Croatia) Nikola Mektić	4–6, 4–6
Loss	18–9	Feb 2025	Chile Open, Chile	250 Series	Clay	(Argentina) Máximo González	(Colombia) Nicolás Barrientos (India) Rithvik Choudary Bollipalli	3-6, 2–6
Loss	18–10	May 2025	Hamburg Open, Germany	500 Series	Clay	(Brazil) Fernando Romboli	(Italy) Simone Bolelli (Italy) Andrea Vavassori	4–6, 0–6

== ATP Challenger and ITF Futures titles (71) ==
=== Singles (16) ===
Legend
Challengers (1)
Futures (15)

No.	Date	Tournament	Surface	Opponent in the final	Score in the final
1.	5 May 2008	Argentina F1 (Reconquista, Santa Fe)	Clay	(Argentina) Federico Cavallero	7–6^{(7–3)}, 7–6^{(7–3)}
2.	15 June 2009	Argentina F9	Clay	(Argentina) Juan-Pablo Villar	5–7, 6–4, 6–4
3.	27 July 2009	Venezuela F6	Hard	(Argentina) Gonzalo Tur	6–4, 6–2
4.	10 May 2010	Argentina F6	Clay	(Argentina) Antonio Pastorino	6–4, 6–3
5.	31 May 2010	Argentina F7 (Neuquén)	Clay	(Argentina) Diego Schwartzman	6–4, 6–2
6.	21 June 2010	Argentina F10	Clay	(Argentina) Antonio Pastorino	6–3, 6–0
7.	19 July 2010	Argentina F14	Clay	(Argentina) Facundo Argüello	3–6, 7–6^{(7–4)}, 6–1
8.	1 November 2010	Argentina F22	Clay	(Argentina) Marco Trungelliti	6–2, 6–0
9.	28 February 2011	Salinas, Ecuador	Hard	(Argentina) Horacio Zeballos	7–5, 7–6^{(7–4)}

=== Doubles (55) ===
Legend
Challengers (23)
Futures (32)

No.	Date	Tournament	Surface	Partner	Opponents in the final	Score in final
1.	31 July 2006	Argentina F10	Clay	(Argentina) Nicolás Jara-Lozano	(Argentina) Rodolfo Daruich (Argentina) Demian Gschwend	6–3, 7–5
2.	13 August 2007	Argentina F12	Clay	(Argentina) Demian Gschwend	(Argentina) Guillermo Bujniewicz (Argentina) Damián Listingart	6–4, 6–4
3.	8 September 2008	Bolivia F1	Clay	(Argentina) Guillermo Carry	(Venezuela) Miguel Cicenia (Bolivia) Mauricio Doria-Medina	6–4, 6–4
4.	15 September 2008	Bolivia F2	Clay	(Argentina) Guillermo Carry	(Argentina) Facundo Bagnis (Argentina) Agustín Picco	6–2, 6–4
5.	22 September 2008	Bolivia F3	Clay	(Argentina) Guillermo Carry	(Italy) Alessandro Liberatore (Argentina) Juan-Pablo Villar	6–1, 6–0
6.	27 October 2008	Argentina F14	Clay	(Argentina) Guido Pella	(Argentina) Alejandro Kon (Argentina) Gonzalo Tur	4–6, 6–3, [10–8]
7.	10 November 2008	Argentina F16	Clay	(Argentina) Guido Pella	(Argentina) Guillermo Bujniewicz (Argentina) Nicolás Jara-Lozano	6–3, 5–7, [14–12]
8.	1 December 2008	Argentina F17	Clay	(Argentina) Guido Pella	(Argentina) Diego Cristin (Argentina) Gastón-Arturo Grimolizzi	6–7^{(6–8)}, 7–6^{(13–11)}, [10–6]
9.	27 April 2009	Argentina F3	Clay	(Argentina) Guido Pella	(Argentina) Guillermo Durán (Argentina) German Gaich	6–2, 6–4
10.	18 May 2009	Argentina F6	Clay	(Argentina) Diego Cristin	(Argentina) Federico Cavallero (Argentina) Agustín Picco	2–6, 7–6^{(9–7)}, [10–5]
11.	22 June 2009	Argentina F10	Clay	(Argentina) Nicolás Jara-Lozano	(Argentina) Alejandro Kon (Argentina) Juan-Manuel Valverde	7–6^{(7–5)}, 6–2
12.	10 August 2009	Colombia F3	Clay	(Argentina) Gonzalo Tur	(Mexico) Daniel Garza (Colombia) Michael Quintero	6–4, 7–6^{(8–6)}
13.	7 September 2009	Argentina F14	Clay	(Argentina) Gonzalo Tur	(Argentina) Guido Andreozzi (Argentina) Kevin Konfederak	4–6, 6–2, [12–10]
14.	23 November 2009	Argentina F25	Clay	(Argentina) Guido Pella	(Argentina) Alejandro Fabbri (Argentina) Jonathan Gonzalia	6–1, 6–3
15.	25 January 2010	Argentina F1	Clay	(Argentina) Diego Cristin	(Argentina) Alejandro Fabbri (Argentina) Jonathan Gonzalia	7–5, 6–7^{(6–8)}, [10–6]
16.	8 February 2010	Argentina F3	Clay	(Argentina) Diego Cristin	(Argentina) Alejandro Fabbri (Argentina) Diego Schwartzman	6–3, 6–4
17.	31 May 2010	Argentina F7	Clay	(Argentina) Nicolás Jara-Lozano	(Argentina) Rodrigo Gómez Saigos (Argentina) Gustavo Sterin	6–3, 6–2
18.	14 June 2010	Argentina F9	Clay	(Argentina) Diego Schwartzman	(Argentina) Lionel Noviski (Argentina) Antonio Pastorino	6–2, 6–3
19.	28 June 2010	Argentina F11	Clay	(Argentina) Diego Schwartzman	(Argentina) Gastón Giussani (Argentina) Joaquín-Jesús Monteferrario	3–6, 6–2, [10–4]
20.	19 July 2010	Argentina F14	Clay	(Argentina) Diego Schwartzman	(Argentina) Facundo Argüello (Argentina) Federico Coria	6–3, 6–4
21.	6 August 2011	Trani	Clay	(Chile) Jorge Aguilar	(Italy) Giulio Di Meo (Italy) Stefano Ianni	6–4, 6–4
22.	22 April 2012	Santos	Clay	(Argentina) Marco Trungelliti	(Brazil) Rogério Dutra da Silva (Brazil) Júlio Silva	6–4, 6–3
23.	17 November 2013	Lima	Clay	(Brazil) Fernando Romboli	(Brazil) Marcelo Demoliner (Peru) Sergio Galdós	6–4, 6–4
24.	27 April 2014	Santos	Clay	(Argentina) Máximo González	(Argentina) Guillermo Durán (Argentina) Renzo Olivo	7–5, 6–4
25.	17 April 2021	Belgrade	Clay	(Argentina) Guillermo Durán	(Bosnia and Herzegovina) Tomislav Brkić (Serbia) Nikola Ćaćić	6–4, 6–4
26.	18 September 2021	Szczecin	Clay	(Mexico) Santiago González	(Sweden) André Göransson (United States) Nathaniel Lammons	2–6, 6–2, [15–13]
