= Córdoba Open =

Argentinian tennis tournament

Defunct tennis tournament
- Tour: ATP World Tour
- Founded: 2019
- Abolished: 2024
- Editions: 6
- Location: Córdoba; Argentina
- Venue: Polo Deportivo Kempes
- Category: ATP World Tour 250
- Surface: Clay – outdoors
- Draw: 28S / 16Q / 16D
- Prize money: US$562,345 (2024)
- Website: cordobaopen.com

Current champions (2024)
- Singles: (Italy) Luciano Darderi
- Doubles: (Argentina) Máximo González (Argentina) Andrés Molteni

The Córdoba Open was a men's ATP World Tour 250 series tournament played on outdoor clay courts until 2024. It was held for the first time as part of the 2019 ATP Tour, replacing the Ecuador Open Quito. The tournament took place at the "Polo Deportivo Kempes", a sports complex next to Estadio Mario Alberto Kempes in Córdoba, Argentina. The tournament was part of the Latin American Golden Swing in the ATP Tour until 2024 when it was replaced by the Challenger Córdoba starting in 2025.

Andrés Molteni is the doubles record holder with four victories.

== Past finals ==
=== Singles ===
Year	Champion	Runner-up	Score
2019	(Argentina) Juan Ignacio Londero	(Argentina) Guido Pella	3–6, 7–5, 6–1
2020	(Chile) Cristian Garín	(Argentina) Diego Schwartzman	2–6, 6–4, 6–0
2021	(Argentina) Juan Manuel Cerúndolo	(Spain) Albert Ramos Viñolas	6–0, 2–6, 6–2
2022	(Spain) Albert Ramos Viñolas	(Chile) Alejandro Tabilo	4–6, 6–3, 6–4
2023	(Argentina) Sebastián Báez	(Argentina) Federico Coria	6–1, 3–6, 6–3
2024	(Italy) Luciano Darderi	(Argentina) Facundo Bagnis	6–1, 6–4

=== Doubles ===
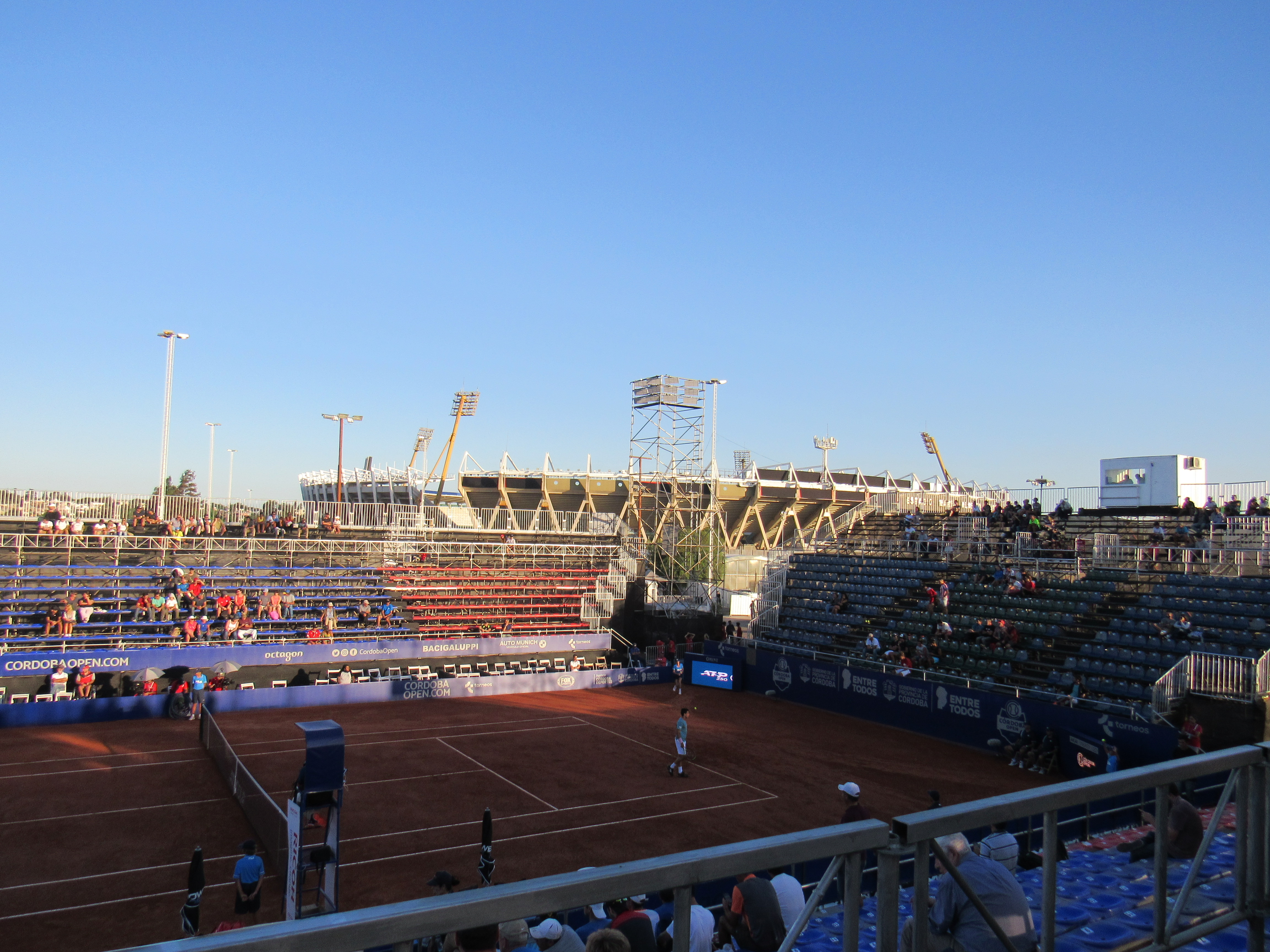
Central Court and Estadio Mario Alberto Kempes in background

Year	Champions	Runners-up	Score
2019	(Czech Republic) Roman Jebavý (Argentina) Andrés Molteni (1)	(Argentina) Máximo González (Argentina) Horacio Zeballos	6–4, 7–6^{(7–4)}
2020	(Brazil) Marcelo Demoliner (Netherlands) Matwé Middelkoop	(Argentina) Leonardo Mayer (Argentina) Andrés Molteni	6–3, 7–6^{(7–4)}
2021	(Brazil) Rafael Matos (Brazil) Felipe Meligeni Alves	(Monaco) Romain Arneodo (France) Benoît Paire	6–4, 6–1
2022	(Mexico) Santiago González (Argentina) Andrés Molteni (2)	(Slovakia) Andrej Martin (Austria) Tristan-Samuel Weissborn	7–5, 6–3
2023	(Argentina) Máximo González (Argentina) Andrés Molteni (3)	(France) Sadio Doumbia (France) Fabien Reboul	6–4, 6–4
2024	(Argentina) Máximo González(2) (Argentina) Andrés Molteni (4)	(France) Sadio Doumbia (France) Fabien Reboul	6–4, 6–1
