= 2025 ATP Tour =

Men's tennis circuit

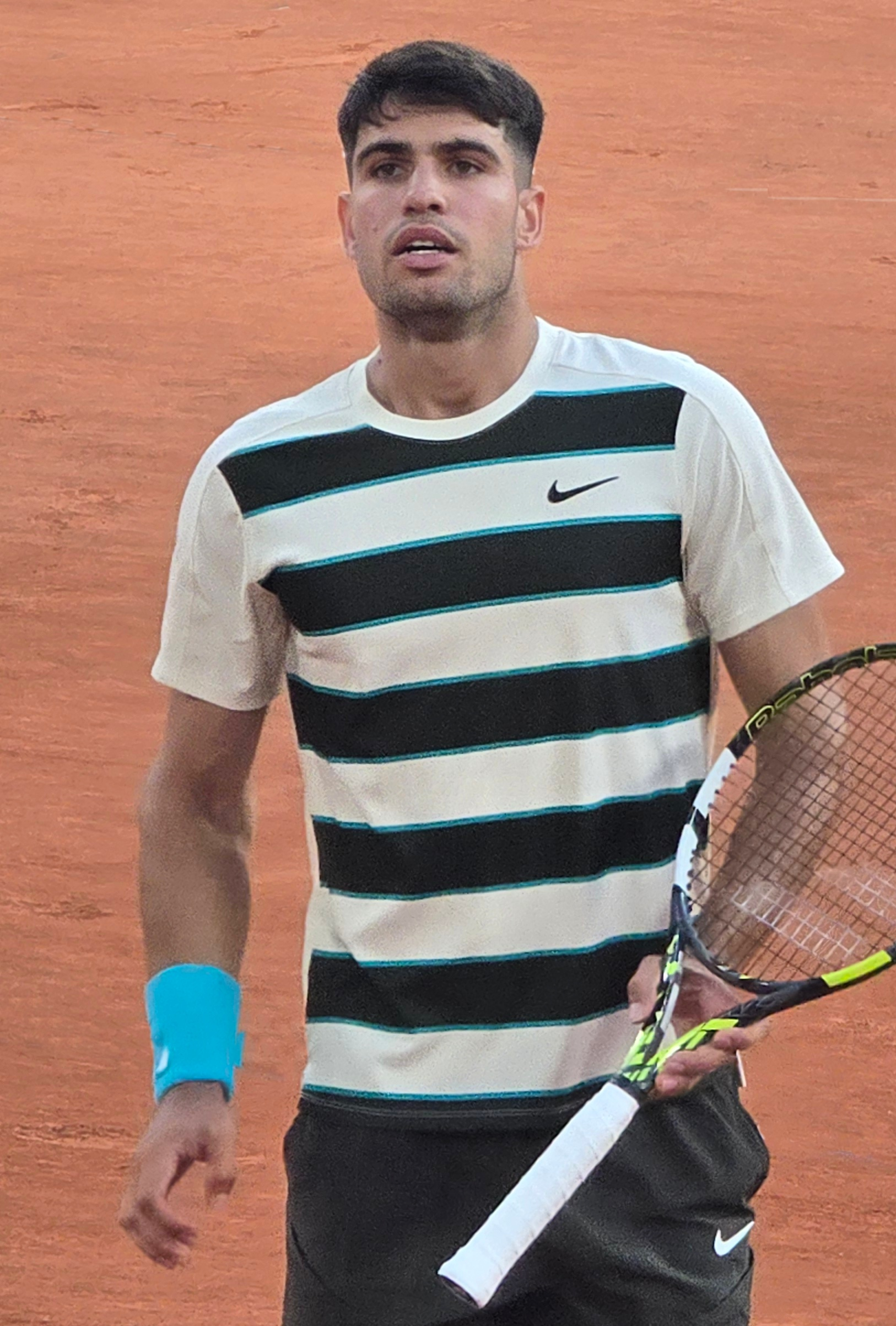
- Carlos Alcaraz finished the year as world No. 1 for the second time in his career. He won eight tournaments during the season, including two majors at the French Open and US Open. He also won three Masters 1000 events and finished runner-up at another major, the Wimbledon Championships.

Details
- Duration: 27 Dec 2024 – 21 Dec 2025
- Edition: 56th
- Tournaments: 65
- Categories: Grand Slam (4); ATP Finals; Next Gen ATP Finals; ATP 1000 (9); ATP 500 (16); ATP 250 (30); Davis Cup; United Cup; Laver Cup; Hopman Cup

Achievements (singles)
- Most titles: (Spain) Carlos Alcaraz (8)
- Most finals: (Spain) Carlos Alcaraz (11)
- Prize money leader: (Spain) Carlos Alcaraz ($21,354,778)
- Points leader: (Spain) Carlos Alcaraz (12,050)

Awards
- Player of the year: (Spain) Carlos Alcaraz
- Doubles team of the year: (United Kingdom) Julian Cash; (United Kingdom) Lloyd Glasspool
- Most improved player of the year: (United States) Learner Tien
- Newcomer of the year: (Monaco) Valentin Vacherot

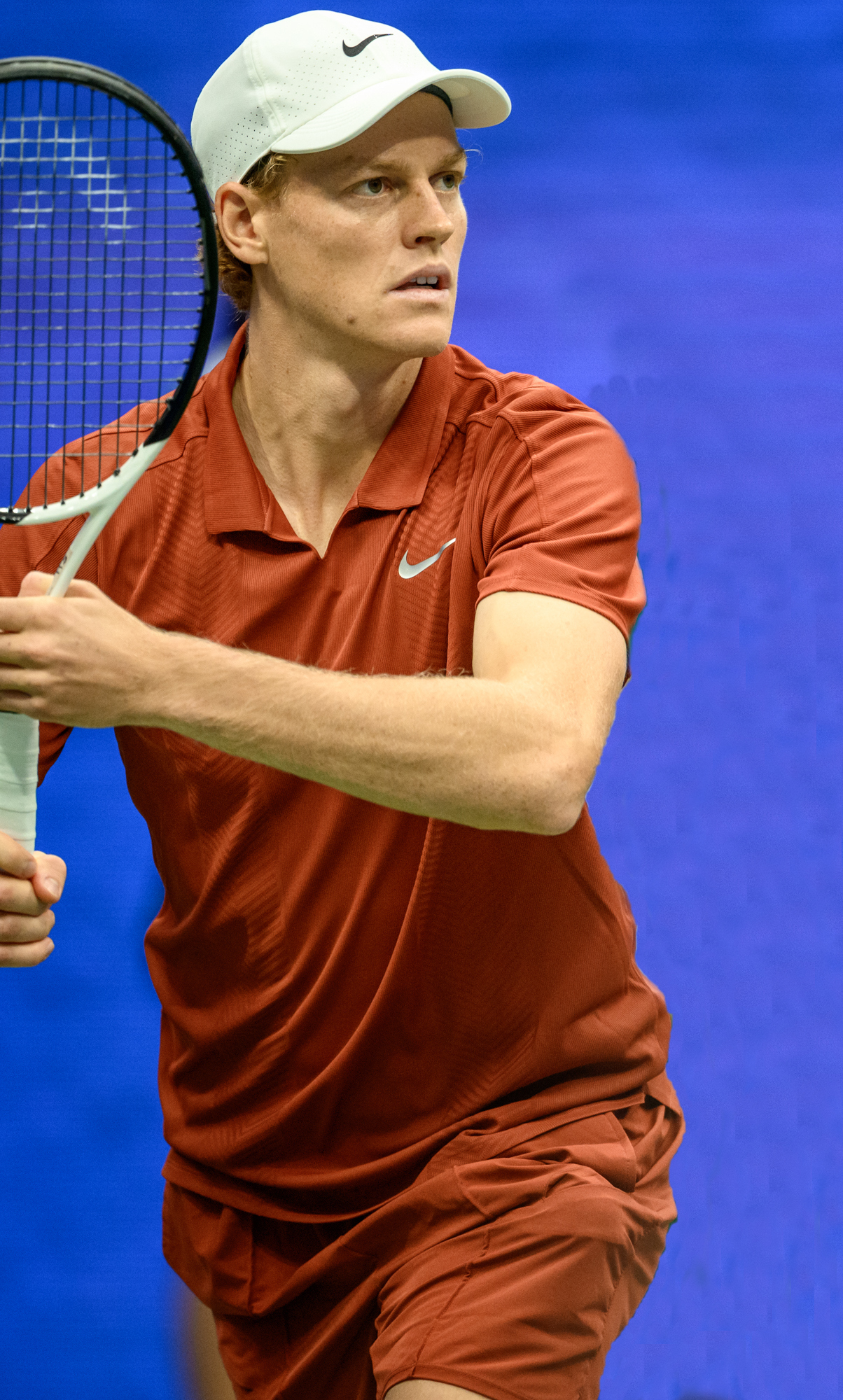
Jannik Sinner won his second consecutive Australian Open title, defeating Alexander Zverev. He then defeated two-time defending champion Carlos Alcaraz at Wimbledon to win his fourth career major title.

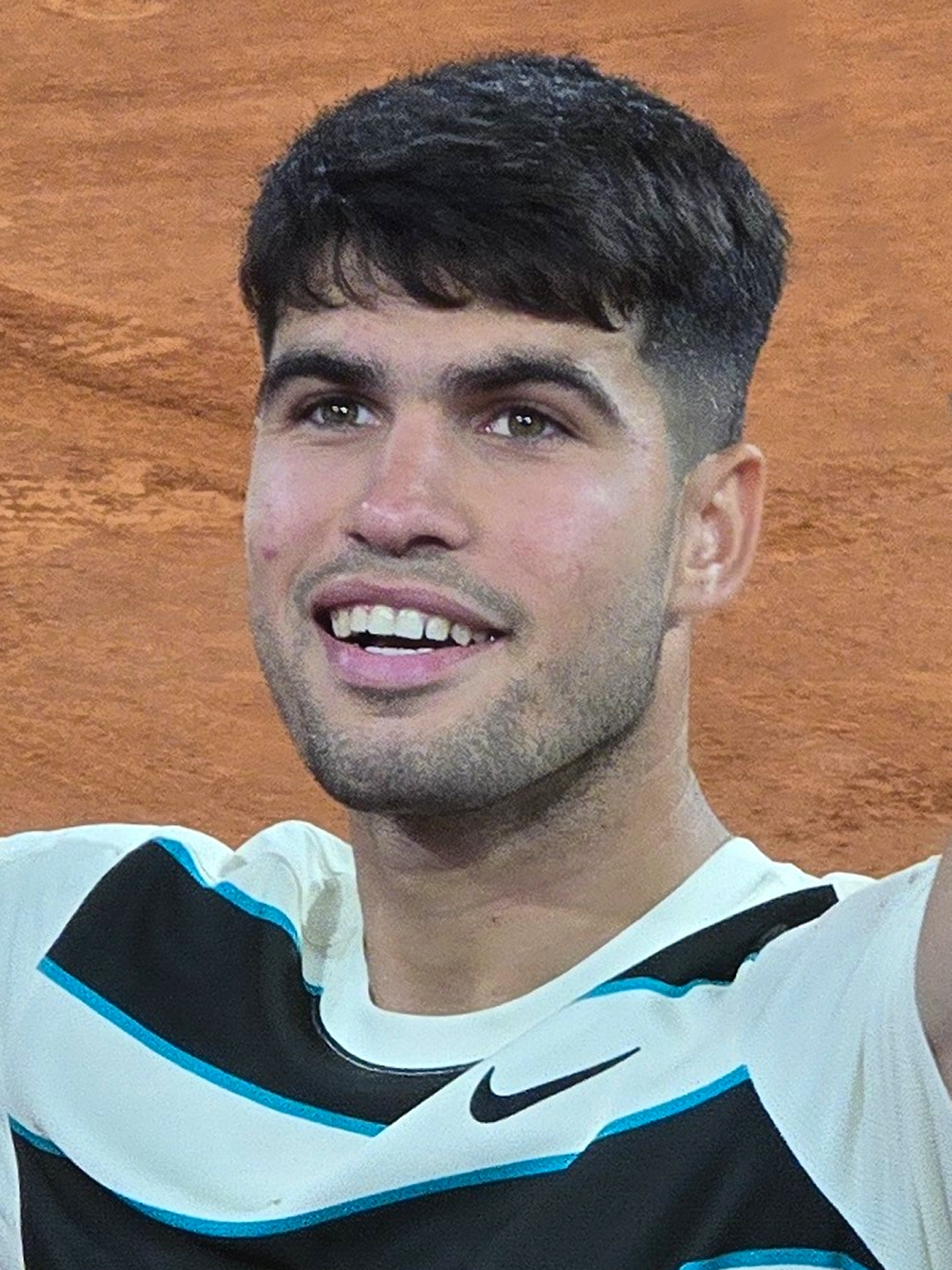
Carlos Alcaraz won his second consecutive French Open title and fifth major overall, saving three championship points and coming back from a two-set deficit against Jannik Sinner in the final. He then won his second US Open title and sixth major overall, defeating the defending champion, Sinner, in the final.

The 2025 ATP Tour was the global elite men's professional tennis circuit organized by the Association of Tennis Professionals (ATP) for the 2025 tennis season. The 2025 ATP Tour calendar comprised the Grand Slam tournaments, supervised by the International Tennis Federation (ITF); the ATP Finals; the ATP Tour Masters 1000; the ATP 500; the ATP 250; and the United Cup (organized with the WTA). Also included in the 2025 calendar were the Davis Cup (organized by the ITF), Next Gen ATP Finals, Hopman Cup and Laver Cup, none of which distribute ranking points.

== Schedule ==
This is the schedule of events on the 2025 calendar.

Key
Grand Slam
ATP Finals
ATP 1000
ATP 500
ATP 250
Team events

=== January ===
Week	Tournament	Champions	Runners-up	Semifinalists	Quarterfinalists
30 Dec	United Cup; Perth/Sydney, Australia; United Cup; Hard – $10,000,000 – 18 teams	(United States) United States; 2–0	Poland	Kazakhstan; Czech Republic	Germany (United Kingdom) Great Britain; China; Italy
30 Dec	Hong Kong Open; Hong Kong SAR; ATP 250; Hard – $766,290 – 28S/16Q/16D; Singles – Doubles	(France) Alexandre Müller; 2–6, 6–1, 6–3	(Japan) Kei Nishikori	(China) Shang Juncheng (Spain) Jaume Munar	(Hungary) Fábián Marozsán (United Kingdom) Cameron Norrie (France) Arthur Fils (Italy) Lorenzo Musetti
30 Dec	Hong Kong Open; Hong Kong SAR; ATP 250; Hard – $766,290 – 28S/16Q/16D; Singles – Doubles	(Netherlands) Sander Arends (United Kingdom) Luke Johnson; 7–5, 4–6, [10–7]	Karen Khachanov; Andrey Rublev	(China) Shang Juncheng (Spain) Jaume Munar	(Hungary) Fábián Marozsán (United Kingdom) Cameron Norrie (France) Arthur Fils (Italy) Lorenzo Musetti
30 Dec	Brisbane International; Brisbane, Australia; ATP 250; Hard – $680,140 – 32S/24Q/24D; Singles – Doubles	(Czech Republic) Jiří Lehečka; 4–1 ret.	(United States) Reilly Opelka	(France) Giovanni Mpetshi Perricard (Bulgaria) Grigor Dimitrov	(Serbia) Novak Djokovic (Czech Republic) Jakub Menšík (Chile) Nicolás Jarry (Australia) Jordan Thompson
30 Dec	Brisbane International; Brisbane, Australia; ATP 250; Hard – $680,140 – 32S/24Q/24D; Singles – Doubles	(United Kingdom) Julian Cash (United Kingdom) Lloyd Glasspool; 6–3, 6–7^{(2–7)}, [10–6]	(Czech Republic) Jiří Lehečka (Czech Republic) Jakub Menšík	(France) Giovanni Mpetshi Perricard (Bulgaria) Grigor Dimitrov	(Serbia) Novak Djokovic (Czech Republic) Jakub Menšík (Chile) Nicolás Jarry (Australia) Jordan Thompson
6 Jan	Adelaide International; Adelaide, Australia; ATP 250; Hard – $766,290 – 28S/16Q/24D; Singles – Doubles	(Canada) Félix Auger-Aliassime; 6–3, 3–6, 6–1	(United States) Sebastian Korda	(United States) Tommy Paul (Serbia) Miomir Kecmanović	(Australia) Rinky Hijikata (United States) Marcos Giron (France) Benjamin Bonzi (Australia) Thanasi Kokkinakis
6 Jan	Adelaide International; Adelaide, Australia; ATP 250; Hard – $766,290 – 28S/16Q/24D; Singles – Doubles	(Italy) Simone Bolelli (Italy) Andrea Vavassori; 4–6, 7–6^{(7–4)}, [11–9]	(Germany) Kevin Krawietz (Germany) Tim Pütz	(United States) Tommy Paul (Serbia) Miomir Kecmanović	(Australia) Rinky Hijikata (United States) Marcos Giron (France) Benjamin Bonzi (Australia) Thanasi Kokkinakis
6 Jan	Auckland Open; Auckland, New Zealand; ATP 250; Hard – $766,290 – 28S/16Q/16D; Singles – Doubles	(France) Gaël Monfils; 6–3, 6–4	(Belgium) Zizou Bergs	(Portugal) Nuno Borges (United States) Nishesh Basavareddy	(Czech Republic) Jakub Menšík (Spain) Roberto Carballés Baena (Argentina) Facundo Díaz Acosta (United States) Alex Michelsen
6 Jan	Auckland Open; Auckland, New Zealand; ATP 250; Hard – $766,290 – 28S/16Q/16D; Singles – Doubles	(Croatia) Nikola Mektić (New Zealand) Michael Venus; Walkover	(United States) Christian Harrison (United States) Rajeev Ram	(Portugal) Nuno Borges (United States) Nishesh Basavareddy	(Czech Republic) Jakub Menšík (Spain) Roberto Carballés Baena (Argentina) Facundo Díaz Acosta (United States) Alex Michelsen
13 Jan; 20 Jan	Australian Open; Melbourne, Australia; Grand Slam; Hard – A$43,250,000; 128S/128Q/64D/32X; Singles – Doubles – Mixed	(Italy) Jannik Sinner; 6–3, 7–6^{(7–4)}, 6–3	(Germany) Alexander Zverev	(United States) Ben Shelton (Serbia) Novak Djokovic	(Australia) Alex de Minaur (Italy) Lorenzo Sonego (Spain) Carlos Alcaraz (United States) Tommy Paul
13 Jan; 20 Jan	Australian Open; Melbourne, Australia; Grand Slam; Hard – A$43,250,000; 128S/128Q/64D/32X; Singles – Doubles – Mixed	(Finland) Harri Heliövaara (United Kingdom) Henry Patten; 6–7^{(16–18)}, 7–6^{(7–5)}, 6–3	(Italy) Simone Bolelli (Italy) Andrea Vavassori	(United States) Ben Shelton (Serbia) Novak Djokovic	(Australia) Alex de Minaur (Italy) Lorenzo Sonego (Spain) Carlos Alcaraz (United States) Tommy Paul
13 Jan; 20 Jan	Australian Open; Melbourne, Australia; Grand Slam; Hard – A$43,250,000; 128S/128Q/64D/32X; Singles – Doubles – Mixed	(Australia) Olivia Gadecki (Australia) John Peers; 3–6, 6–4, [10–6]	(Australia) Kimberly Birrell (Australia) John-Patrick Smith	(United States) Ben Shelton (Serbia) Novak Djokovic	(Australia) Alex de Minaur (Italy) Lorenzo Sonego (Spain) Carlos Alcaraz (United States) Tommy Paul
27 Jan	Davis Cup Qualifiers first round Stockholm, Sweden – hard (i); Montreal, Canada – hard (i); Vilnius, Lithuania – hard (i); Taipei, Chinese Taipei – hard (i); Copenhagen, Denmark – hard (i); Osijek, Croatia – hard (i); Orléans, France – hard (i); Biel, Switzerland – hard (i); Ostrava, Czech Republic – hard (i); Miki, Japan – hard (i); Schwechat, Austria – clay (i); Hasselt, Belgium – hard (i); Fjellhamar, Norway – hard (i)	Qualifying round winners Australia 3–1; Hungary 3–2; Germany 3–1; United States 4–0; Denmark 3–2; Croatia 3–1; France 4–0; Spain 3–1; Czech Republic 4–0; Japan 3–2; Austria 4–0; Belgium 3–1; Argentina 3–2	Qualifying round losers Sweden; Canada; Israel; Chinese Taipei; Serbia; Slovakia; Brazil; Switzerland; South Korea; Great Britain; Finland; Chile; Norway		
27 Jan	Open Occitanie; Montpellier, France; ATP 250; Hard (i) – €622,850 – 28S/16Q/16D; Singles – Doubles	(Canada) Félix Auger-Aliassime; 6–2, 6–7^{(7–9)}, 7–6^{(7–2)}	(United States) Aleksandar Kovacevic	Andrey Rublev (Netherlands) Jesper de Jong	(Georgia (country)) Nikoloz Basilashvili (Kazakhstan) Alexander Bublik (Netherlands) Tallon Griekspoor (China) Bu Yunchaokete
27 Jan	Open Occitanie; Montpellier, France; ATP 250; Hard (i) – €622,850 – 28S/16Q/16D; Singles – Doubles	(Netherlands) Robin Haase (Netherlands) Botic van de Zandschulp; 6–7^{(7–9)}, 6–3, [10–5]	(Netherlands) Tallon Griekspoor (Netherlands) Bart Stevens	Andrey Rublev (Netherlands) Jesper de Jong	(Georgia (country)) Nikoloz Basilashvili (Kazakhstan) Alexander Bublik (Netherlands) Tallon Griekspoor (China) Bu Yunchaokete

=== February ===
Week	Tournament	Champions	Runners-up	Semifinalists	Quarterfinalists
3 Feb	Dallas Open; Dallas, United States; ATP 500; Hard (i) – $3,035,960 – 32S/16Q/16D; Singles – Doubles	(Canada) Denis Shapovalov; 7–6^{(7–5)}, 6–3	(Norway) Casper Ruud	(United States) Tommy Paul (Spain) Jaume Munar	(Czech Republic) Tomáš Macháč (United States) Reilly Opelka (Italy) Matteo Arnaldi (Japan) Yoshihito Nishioka
3 Feb	Dallas Open; Dallas, United States; ATP 500; Hard (i) – $3,035,960 – 32S/16Q/16D; Singles – Doubles	(United States) Christian Harrison (United States) Evan King; 7–6^{(7–4)}, 7–6^{(7–4)}	(Uruguay) Ariel Behar (United States) Robert Galloway	(United States) Tommy Paul (Spain) Jaume Munar	(Czech Republic) Tomáš Macháč (United States) Reilly Opelka (Italy) Matteo Arnaldi (Japan) Yoshihito Nishioka
3 Feb	Rotterdam Open; Rotterdam, Netherlands; ATP 500; Hard (i) – €2,563,150 – 32S/16Q/16D; Singles – Doubles	(Spain) Carlos Alcaraz; 6–4, 3–6, 6–2	(Australia) Alex de Minaur	(Poland) Hubert Hurkacz (Italy) Mattia Bellucci	(Spain) Pedro Martínez; Andrey Rublev (Germany) Daniel Altmaier (Greece) Stefanos Tsitsipas
3 Feb	Rotterdam Open; Rotterdam, Netherlands; ATP 500; Hard (i) – €2,563,150 – 32S/16Q/16D; Singles – Doubles	(Italy) Simone Bolelli (Italy) Andrea Vavassori; 6–2, 4–6, [10–6]	(Belgium) Sander Gillé (Poland) Jan Zieliński	(Poland) Hubert Hurkacz (Italy) Mattia Bellucci	(Spain) Pedro Martínez; Andrey Rublev (Germany) Daniel Altmaier (Greece) Stefanos Tsitsipas
10 Feb	Delray Beach Open; Delray Beach, United States; ATP 250; Hard – $710,735 – 28S/16Q/16D; Singles – Doubles	(Serbia) Miomir Kecmanović; 3–6, 6–1, 7–5	(Spain) Alejandro Davidovich Fokina	(Italy) Matteo Arnaldi (United States) Alex Michelsen	(United States) Taylor Fritz (United States) Brandon Nakashima (United Kingdom) Cameron Norrie (United States) Marcos Giron
10 Feb	Delray Beach Open; Delray Beach, United States; ATP 250; Hard – $710,735 – 28S/16Q/16D; Singles – Doubles	(Serbia) Miomir Kecmanović (United States) Brandon Nakashima; 7–6^{(7–3)}, 1–6, [10–3]	(United States) Christian Harrison (United States) Evan King	(Italy) Matteo Arnaldi (United States) Alex Michelsen	(United States) Taylor Fritz (United States) Brandon Nakashima (United Kingdom) Cameron Norrie (United States) Marcos Giron
10 Feb	Open 13; Marseille, France; ATP 250; Hard (i) – €767,545 – 28S/16Q/16D; Singles – Doubles	(France) Ugo Humbert; 7–6^{(7–4)}, 6–4	(Serbia) Hamad Medjedovic	Daniil Medvedev (Belgium) Zizou Bergs	(Germany) Jan-Lennard Struff (Germany) Daniel Altmaier (China) Zhang Zhizhen (Italy) Lorenzo Sonego
10 Feb	Open 13; Marseille, France; ATP 250; Hard (i) – €767,545 – 28S/16Q/16D; Singles – Doubles	(France) Benjamin Bonzi (France) Pierre-Hugues Herbert; 6–3, 6–4	(Belgium) Sander Gillé (Poland) Jan Zieliński	Daniil Medvedev (Belgium) Zizou Bergs	(Germany) Jan-Lennard Struff (Germany) Daniel Altmaier (China) Zhang Zhizhen (Italy) Lorenzo Sonego
10 Feb	Argentina Open; Buenos Aires, Argentina; ATP 250; Clay (red) – $688,985 – 28S/16Q/16D; Singles – Doubles	(Brazil) João Fonseca; 6–4, 7–6^{(7–1)}	(Argentina) Francisco Cerúndolo	(Spain) Pedro Martínez (Serbia) Laslo Djere	(Germany) Alexander Zverev (Italy) Lorenzo Musetti (Brazil) Thiago Seyboth Wild (Argentina) Mariano Navone
10 Feb	Argentina Open; Buenos Aires, Argentina; ATP 250; Clay (red) – $688,985 – 28S/16Q/16D; Singles – Doubles	(Argentina) Guido Andreozzi (France) Théo Arribagé; 7–5, 4–6, [10–7]	(Brazil) Rafael Matos (Brazil) Marcelo Melo	(Spain) Pedro Martínez (Serbia) Laslo Djere	(Germany) Alexander Zverev (Italy) Lorenzo Musetti (Brazil) Thiago Seyboth Wild (Argentina) Mariano Navone
17 Feb	Qatar Open; Doha, Qatar; ATP 500; Hard – $3,035,960 – 32S/16Q/16D; Singles – Doubles	Andrey Rublev; 7–5, 5–7, 6–1	(United Kingdom) Jack Draper	(Czech Republic) Jiří Lehečka (Canada) Félix Auger-Aliassime	(Spain) Carlos Alcaraz (Italy) Matteo Berrettini; Daniil Medvedev (Australia) Alex de Minaur
17 Feb	Qatar Open; Doha, Qatar; ATP 500; Hard – $3,035,960 – 32S/16Q/16D; Singles – Doubles	(United Kingdom) Julian Cash (United Kingdom) Lloyd Glasspool; 6–3, 6–2	(United Kingdom) Joe Salisbury (United Kingdom) Neal Skupski	(Czech Republic) Jiří Lehečka (Canada) Félix Auger-Aliassime	(Spain) Carlos Alcaraz (Italy) Matteo Berrettini; Daniil Medvedev (Australia) Alex de Minaur
17 Feb	Rio Open; Rio de Janeiro, Brazil; ATP 500; Clay (red) – $2,574,145 – 32S/16Q/16D; Singles – Doubles	(Argentina) Sebastián Báez; 6–2, 6–3	(France) Alexandre Müller	(Argentina) Francisco Comesaña (Argentina) Camilo Ugo Carabelli	(Germany) Alexander Zverev (Argentina) Francisco Cerúndolo (Chinese Taipei) Tseng Chun-hsin (Portugal) Jaime Faria
17 Feb	Rio Open; Rio de Janeiro, Brazil; ATP 500; Clay (red) – $2,574,145 – 32S/16Q/16D; Singles – Doubles	(Brazil) Rafael Matos (Brazil) Marcelo Melo; 6–2, 7–5	(Spain) Pedro Martínez (Spain) Jaume Munar	(Argentina) Francisco Comesaña (Argentina) Camilo Ugo Carabelli	(Germany) Alexander Zverev (Argentina) Francisco Cerúndolo (Chinese Taipei) Tseng Chun-hsin (Portugal) Jaime Faria
24 Feb	Dubai Tennis Championships; Dubai, United Arab Emirates; ATP 500; Hard – $3,415,700 – 32S/16Q/16D; Singles – Doubles	(Greece) Stefanos Tsitsipas; 6–3, 6–3	(Canada) Félix Auger-Aliassime	(Netherlands) Tallon Griekspoor (France) Quentin Halys	Daniil Medvedev (Italy) Matteo Berrettini (Italy) Luca Nardi (Croatia) Marin Čilić
24 Feb	Dubai Tennis Championships; Dubai, United Arab Emirates; ATP 500; Hard – $3,415,700 – 32S/16Q/16D; Singles – Doubles	(India) Yuki Bhambri (Australia) Alexei Popyrin; 3–6, 7–6^{(14–12)}, [10–8]	(Finland) Harri Heliövaara (United Kingdom) Henry Patten	(Netherlands) Tallon Griekspoor (France) Quentin Halys	Daniil Medvedev (Italy) Matteo Berrettini (Italy) Luca Nardi (Croatia) Marin Čilić
24 Feb	Mexican Open; Acapulco, Mexico; ATP 500; Hard – $2,763,440 – 32S/16Q/16D; Singles – Doubles	(Czech Republic) Tomáš Macháč; 7–6^{(8–6)}, 6–2	(Spain) Alejandro Davidovich Fokina	(United States) Brandon Nakashima (Canada) Denis Shapovalov	(United States) Learner Tien (Belgium) David Goffin (United States) Marcos Giron (Mexico) Rodrigo Pacheco Méndez
24 Feb	Mexican Open; Acapulco, Mexico; ATP 500; Hard – $2,763,440 – 32S/16Q/16D; Singles – Doubles	(United States) Christian Harrison (United States) Evan King; 6–4, 6–0	(France) Sadio Doumbia (France) Fabien Reboul	(United States) Brandon Nakashima (Canada) Denis Shapovalov	(United States) Learner Tien (Belgium) David Goffin (United States) Marcos Giron (Mexico) Rodrigo Pacheco Méndez
24 Feb	Chile Open; Santiago, Chile; ATP 250; Clay (red) – $710,735 – 28S/16Q/16D; Singles – Doubles	(Serbia) Laslo Djere; 6–4, 3–6, 7–5	(Argentina) Sebastián Báez	(Argentina) Francisco Cerúndolo (Argentina) Camilo Ugo Carabelli	(Argentina) Tomás Martín Etcheverry (Portugal) Jaime Faria (Bosnia and Herzegovina) Damir Džumhur (Argentina) Federico Coria
24 Feb	Chile Open; Santiago, Chile; ATP 250; Clay (red) – $710,735 – 28S/16Q/16D; Singles – Doubles	(Colombia) Nicolás Barrientos (India) Rithvik Choudary Bollipalli; 6–3, 6–2	(Argentina) Máximo González (Argentina) Andrés Molteni	(Argentina) Francisco Cerúndolo (Argentina) Camilo Ugo Carabelli	(Argentina) Tomás Martín Etcheverry (Portugal) Jaime Faria (Bosnia and Herzegovina) Damir Džumhur (Argentina) Federico Coria

=== March ===
Week	Tournament	Champions	Runners-up	Semifinalists	Quarterfinalists
3 Mar; 10 Mar	Indian Wells Open; Indian Wells, United States; ATP 1000; Hard – $9,693,540 – 96S/48Q/32D; Singles – Doubles – Mixed	(United Kingdom) Jack Draper; 6–2, 6–2	(Denmark) Holger Rune	Daniil Medvedev (Spain) Carlos Alcaraz	(Netherlands) Tallon Griekspoor (France) Arthur Fils (United States) Ben Shelton (Argentina) Francisco Cerúndolo
3 Mar; 10 Mar	Indian Wells Open; Indian Wells, United States; ATP 1000; Hard – $9,693,540 – 96S/48Q/32D; Singles – Doubles – Mixed	(El Salvador) Marcelo Arévalo (Croatia) Mate Pavić; 6–3, 6–4	(United States) Sebastian Korda (Australia) Jordan Thompson	Daniil Medvedev (Spain) Carlos Alcaraz	(Netherlands) Tallon Griekspoor (France) Arthur Fils (United States) Ben Shelton (Argentina) Francisco Cerúndolo
3 Mar; 10 Mar	Indian Wells Open; Indian Wells, United States; ATP 1000; Hard – $9,693,540 – 96S/48Q/32D; Singles – Doubles – Mixed	(Italy) Sara Errani (Italy) Andrea Vavassori; 6–7^{(3–7)}, 6–3, [10–8]	(United States) Bethanie Mattek-Sands (Croatia) Mate Pavić	Daniil Medvedev (Spain) Carlos Alcaraz	(Netherlands) Tallon Griekspoor (France) Arthur Fils (United States) Ben Shelton (Argentina) Francisco Cerúndolo
17 Mar; 24 Mar	Miami Open; Miami Gardens, United States; ATP 1000; Hard – $9,193,540 – 96S/48Q/32D; Singles – Doubles	(Czech Republic) Jakub Menšík; 7–6^{(7–4)}, 7–6^{(7–4)}	(Serbia) Novak Djokovic	(United States) Taylor Fritz (Bulgaria) Grigor Dimitrov	(France) Arthur Fils (Italy) Matteo Berrettini (United States) Sebastian Korda (Argentina) Francisco Cerúndolo
17 Mar; 24 Mar	Miami Open; Miami Gardens, United States; ATP 1000; Hard – $9,193,540 – 96S/48Q/32D; Singles – Doubles	(El Salvador) Marcelo Arévalo (Croatia) Mate Pavić; 7–6^{(7–3)}, 6–3	(United Kingdom) Julian Cash (United Kingdom) Lloyd Glasspool	(United States) Taylor Fritz (Bulgaria) Grigor Dimitrov	(France) Arthur Fils (Italy) Matteo Berrettini (United States) Sebastian Korda (Argentina) Francisco Cerúndolo
31 Mar	U.S. Men's Clay Court Championships; Houston, United States; ATP 250; Clay (maroon) – $710,735 – 28S/16Q/16D; Singles – Doubles	(United States) Jenson Brooksby; 6–4, 6–2	(United States) Frances Tiafoe	(United States) Tommy Paul (United States) Brandon Nakashima	(United States) Colton Smith (United States) Aleksandar Kovacevic (United States) Christopher Eubanks (United States) Alex Michelsen
31 Mar	U.S. Men's Clay Court Championships; Houston, United States; ATP 250; Clay (maroon) – $710,735 – 28S/16Q/16D; Singles – Doubles	(Brazil) Fernando Romboli (Australia) John-Patrick Smith; 6–1, 6–4	(Argentina) Federico Agustín Gómez (Mexico) Santiago González	(United States) Tommy Paul (United States) Brandon Nakashima	(United States) Colton Smith (United States) Aleksandar Kovacevic (United States) Christopher Eubanks (United States) Alex Michelsen
31 Mar	Grand Prix Hassan II; Marrakesh, Morocco; ATP 250; Clay (red) – €622,850 – 28S/16Q/16D; Singles – Doubles	(Italy) Luciano Darderi; 7–6^{(7–3)}, 7–6^{(7–4)}	(Netherlands) Tallon Griekspoor	(Poland) Kamil Majchrzak (Spain) Roberto Carballés Baena	(Italy) Mattia Bellucci (France) Alexandre Müller (Portugal) Nuno Borges (Czech Republic) Vít Kopřiva
31 Mar	Grand Prix Hassan II; Marrakesh, Morocco; ATP 250; Clay (red) – €622,850 – 28S/16Q/16D; Singles – Doubles	(Czech Republic) Petr Nouza (Czech Republic) Patrik Rikl; 6–3, 6–4	(Monaco) Hugo Nys (France) Édouard Roger-Vasselin	(Poland) Kamil Majchrzak (Spain) Roberto Carballés Baena	(Italy) Mattia Bellucci (France) Alexandre Müller (Portugal) Nuno Borges (Czech Republic) Vít Kopřiva
31 Mar	Romanian Open; Bucharest, Romania; ATP 250; Clay (red) – €622,850 – 28S/16Q/16D; Singles – Doubles	(Italy) Flavio Cobolli; 6–4, 6–4	(Argentina) Sebastián Báez	(Hungary) Márton Fucsovics (Bosnia and Herzegovina) Damir Džumhur	(Argentina) Francisco Comesaña (Australia) Christopher O'Connell (Austria) Filip Misolic (Spain) Pedro Martínez
31 Mar	Romanian Open; Bucharest, Romania; ATP 250; Clay (red) – €622,850 – 28S/16Q/16D; Singles – Doubles	(Spain) Marcel Granollers (Argentina) Horacio Zeballos; 7–6^{(7–3)}, 6–4	(Germany) Jakob Schnaitter (Germany) Mark Wallner	(Hungary) Márton Fucsovics (Bosnia and Herzegovina) Damir Džumhur	(Argentina) Francisco Comesaña (Australia) Christopher O'Connell (Austria) Filip Misolic (Spain) Pedro Martínez

=== April ===
Week	Tournament	Champions	Runners-up	Semifinalists	Quarterfinalists
7 Apr	Monte-Carlo Masters; Roquebrune-Cap-Martin, France; ATP 1000; Clay (red) – €6,128,940 – 56S/28Q/32D; Singles – Doubles	(Spain) Carlos Alcaraz; 3–6, 6–1, 6–0	(Italy) Lorenzo Musetti	(Australia) Alex de Minaur (Spain) Alejandro Davidovich Fokina	(Greece) Stefanos Tsitsipas (Bulgaria) Grigor Dimitrov (Australia) Alexei Popyrin (France) Arthur Fils
7 Apr	Monte-Carlo Masters; Roquebrune-Cap-Martin, France; ATP 1000; Clay (red) – €6,128,940 – 56S/28Q/32D; Singles – Doubles	(Monaco) Romain Arneodo (France) Manuel Guinard; 1–6, 7–6^{(10–8)}, [10–8]	(United Kingdom) Julian Cash (United Kingdom) Lloyd Glasspool	(Australia) Alex de Minaur (Spain) Alejandro Davidovich Fokina	(Greece) Stefanos Tsitsipas (Bulgaria) Grigor Dimitrov (Australia) Alexei Popyrin (France) Arthur Fils
14 Apr	Barcelona Open; Barcelona, Spain; ATP 500; Clay (red) – €3,050,800 – 32S/24Q/16D; Singles – Doubles	(Denmark) Holger Rune; 7–6^{(8–6)}, 6–2	(Spain) Carlos Alcaraz	(France) Arthur Fils; Karen Khachanov	(Australia) Alex de Minaur (Greece) Stefanos Tsitsipas (Spain) Alejandro Davidovich Fokina (Norway) Casper Ruud
14 Apr	Barcelona Open; Barcelona, Spain; ATP 500; Clay (red) – €3,050,800 – 32S/24Q/16D; Singles – Doubles	(Netherlands) Sander Arends (United Kingdom) Luke Johnson; 6–3, 6–7^{(1–7)}, [10–6]	(United Kingdom) Joe Salisbury (United Kingdom) Neal Skupski	(France) Arthur Fils; Karen Khachanov	(Australia) Alex de Minaur (Greece) Stefanos Tsitsipas (Spain) Alejandro Davidovich Fokina (Norway) Casper Ruud
14 Apr	Bavarian International Tennis Championships; Munich, Germany; ATP 500; Clay (red) – €2,747,360 – 32S/16Q/16D; Singles – Doubles	(Germany) Alexander Zverev; 6–2, 6–4	(United States) Ben Shelton	(Hungary) Fábián Marozsán (Argentina) Francisco Cerúndolo	(Netherlands) Tallon Griekspoor (Belgium) Zizou Bergs (Belgium) David Goffin (Italy) Luciano Darderi
14 Apr	Bavarian International Tennis Championships; Munich, Germany; ATP 500; Clay (red) – €2,747,360 – 32S/16Q/16D; Singles – Doubles	(Sweden) André Göransson (Netherlands) Sem Verbeek; 6–4, 6–4	(Germany) Kevin Krawietz (Germany) Tim Pütz	(Hungary) Fábián Marozsán (Argentina) Francisco Cerúndolo	(Netherlands) Tallon Griekspoor (Belgium) Zizou Bergs (Belgium) David Goffin (Italy) Luciano Darderi
21 Apr; 28 Apr	Madrid Open; Madrid, Spain; ATP 1000; Clay (red) – €8,055,385 – 96S/48Q/32D; Singles – Doubles	(Norway) Casper Ruud; 7–5, 3–6, 6–4	(United Kingdom) Jack Draper	(Argentina) Francisco Cerúndolo (Italy) Lorenzo Musetti	(Czech Republic) Jakub Menšík; Daniil Medvedev (Italy) Matteo Arnaldi (Canada) Gabriel Diallo
21 Apr; 28 Apr	Madrid Open; Madrid, Spain; ATP 1000; Clay (red) – €8,055,385 – 96S/48Q/32D; Singles – Doubles	(Spain) Marcel Granollers (Argentina) Horacio Zeballos; 6–4, 6–4	(El Salvador) Marcelo Arévalo (Croatia) Mate Pavić	(Argentina) Francisco Cerúndolo (Italy) Lorenzo Musetti	(Czech Republic) Jakub Menšík; Daniil Medvedev (Italy) Matteo Arnaldi (Canada) Gabriel Diallo

=== May ===
Week	Tournament	Champions	Runners-up	Semifinalists	Quarterfinalists
5 May; 12 May	Italian Open; Rome, Italy; ATP 1000; Clay (red) – €8,055,385 – 96S/48Q/32D; Singles – Doubles	(Spain) Carlos Alcaraz; 7–6^{(7–5)}, 6–1	(Italy) Jannik Sinner	(United States) Tommy Paul (Italy) Lorenzo Musetti	(Norway) Casper Ruud (Poland) Hubert Hurkacz (United Kingdom) Jack Draper (Germany) Alexander Zverev
5 May; 12 May	Italian Open; Rome, Italy; ATP 1000; Clay (red) – €8,055,385 – 96S/48Q/32D; Singles – Doubles	(El Salvador) Marcelo Arévalo (Croatia) Mate Pavić; 6–4, 6–7^{(6–8)}, [13–11]	(France) Sadio Doumbia (France) Fabien Reboul	(United States) Tommy Paul (Italy) Lorenzo Musetti	(Norway) Casper Ruud (Poland) Hubert Hurkacz (United Kingdom) Jack Draper (Germany) Alexander Zverev
19 May	Hamburg Open; Hamburg, Germany; ATP 500; Clay (red) – €2,320,160 – 32S/16Q/16D; Singles – Doubles	(Italy) Flavio Cobolli; 6–2, 6–4	Andrey Rublev	(Canada) Félix Auger-Aliassime (Argentina) Tomás Martín Etcheverry	(France) Alexandre Müller (Italy) Luciano Darderi (Czech Republic) Jiří Lehečka (Spain) Roberto Bautista Agut
19 May	Hamburg Open; Hamburg, Germany; ATP 500; Clay (red) – €2,320,160 – 32S/16Q/16D; Singles – Doubles	(Italy) Simone Bolelli (Italy) Andrea Vavassori; 6–4, 6–0	(Argentina) Andrés Molteni (Brazil) Fernando Romboli	(Canada) Félix Auger-Aliassime (Argentina) Tomás Martín Etcheverry	(France) Alexandre Müller (Italy) Luciano Darderi (Czech Republic) Jiří Lehečka (Spain) Roberto Bautista Agut
19 May	Geneva Open; Geneva, Switzerland; ATP 250; Clay (red) – €622,850 – 28S/16Q/16D; Singles – Doubles	(Serbia) Novak Djokovic; 5–7, 7–6^{(7–2)}, 7–6^{(7–2)}	(Poland) Hubert Hurkacz	(Austria) Sebastian Ofner (United Kingdom) Cameron Norrie	(United States) Taylor Fritz; Karen Khachanov (Australia) Alexei Popyrin (Italy) Matteo Arnaldi
19 May	Geneva Open; Geneva, Switzerland; ATP 250; Clay (red) – €622,850 – 28S/16Q/16D; Singles – Doubles	(France) Sadio Doumbia (France) Fabien Reboul; 6–7^{(4–7)}, 6–4, [11–9]	(Uruguay) Ariel Behar (Belgium) Joran Vliegen	(Austria) Sebastian Ofner (United Kingdom) Cameron Norrie	(United States) Taylor Fritz; Karen Khachanov (Australia) Alexei Popyrin (Italy) Matteo Arnaldi
26 May; 2 Jun	French Open; Paris, France; Grand Slam; Clay (red) – €26,334,000 – 128S/128Q/64D/32X; Singles – Doubles – Mixed	(Spain) Carlos Alcaraz; 4–6, 6–7^{(4–7)}, 6–4, 7–6^{(7–3)}, 7–6^{(10–2)}	(Italy) Jannik Sinner	(Serbia) Novak Djokovic (Italy) Lorenzo Musetti	(Kazakhstan) Alexander Bublik (Germany) Alexander Zverev (United States) Frances Tiafoe (United States) Tommy Paul
26 May; 2 Jun	French Open; Paris, France; Grand Slam; Clay (red) – €26,334,000 – 128S/128Q/64D/32X; Singles – Doubles – Mixed	(Spain) Marcel Granollers (Argentina) Horacio Zeballos; 6–0, 6–7^{(5–7)}, 7–5	(United Kingdom) Joe Salisbury (United Kingdom) Neal Skupski	(Serbia) Novak Djokovic (Italy) Lorenzo Musetti	(Kazakhstan) Alexander Bublik (Germany) Alexander Zverev (United States) Frances Tiafoe (United States) Tommy Paul
26 May; 2 Jun	French Open; Paris, France; Grand Slam; Clay (red) – €26,334,000 – 128S/128Q/64D/32X; Singles – Doubles – Mixed	(Italy) Sara Errani (Italy) Andrea Vavassori; 6–4, 6–2	(United States) Taylor Townsend (United States) Evan King	(Serbia) Novak Djokovic (Italy) Lorenzo Musetti	(Kazakhstan) Alexander Bublik (Germany) Alexander Zverev (United States) Frances Tiafoe (United States) Tommy Paul

=== June ===
Week	Tournament	Champions	Runners-up	Semifinalists	Quarterfinalists
9 Jun	Stuttgart Open; Stuttgart, Germany; ATP 250; Grass – €778,445 – 28S/16Q/16D; Singles – Doubles	(United States) Taylor Fritz; 6–3, 7–6^{(7–0)}	(Germany) Alexander Zverev	(United States) Ben Shelton (Canada) Félix Auger-Aliassime	(United States) Brandon Nakashima (Czech Republic) Jiří Lehečka (Germany) Justin Engel (Hungary) Márton Fucsovics
9 Jun	Stuttgart Open; Stuttgart, Germany; ATP 250; Grass – €778,445 – 28S/16Q/16D; Singles – Doubles	(Mexico) Santiago González (United States) Austin Krajicek; 6–4, 6–4	(United States) Alex Michelsen (United States) Rajeev Ram	(United States) Ben Shelton (Canada) Félix Auger-Aliassime	(United States) Brandon Nakashima (Czech Republic) Jiří Lehečka (Germany) Justin Engel (Hungary) Márton Fucsovics
9 Jun	Rosmalen Grass Court Championships 's-Hertogenbosch, Netherlands; ATP 250; Grass – €733,665 – 28S/16Q/16D; Singles – Doubles	(Canada) Gabriel Diallo; 7–5, 7–6^{(10–8)}	(Belgium) Zizou Bergs	(United States) Reilly Opelka (France) Ugo Humbert	Daniil Medvedev (Estonia) Mark Lajal; Karen Khachanov (Portugal) Nuno Borges
9 Jun	Rosmalen Grass Court Championships 's-Hertogenbosch, Netherlands; ATP 250; Grass – €733,665 – 28S/16Q/16D; Singles – Doubles	(Australia) Matthew Ebden (Australia) Jordan Thompson; 6–4, 3–6, [10–7]	(United Kingdom) Julian Cash (United Kingdom) Lloyd Glasspool	(United States) Reilly Opelka (France) Ugo Humbert	Daniil Medvedev (Estonia) Mark Lajal; Karen Khachanov (Portugal) Nuno Borges
16 Jun	Halle Open; Halle, Germany; ATP 500; Grass – €2,683,820 – 32S/16Q/16D; Singles – Doubles	(Kazakhstan) Alexander Bublik; 6–3, 7–6^{(7–4)}	Daniil Medvedev	Karen Khachanov (Germany) Alexander Zverev	(Czech Republic) Tomáš Macháč (Argentina) Tomás Martín Etcheverry (United States) Alex Michelsen (Italy) Flavio Cobolli
16 Jun	Halle Open; Halle, Germany; ATP 500; Grass – €2,683,820 – 32S/16Q/16D; Singles – Doubles	(Germany) Kevin Krawietz (Germany) Tim Pütz; 6–3, 7–6^{(7–4)}	(Italy) Simone Bolelli (Italy) Andrea Vavassori	Karen Khachanov (Germany) Alexander Zverev	(Czech Republic) Tomáš Macháč (Argentina) Tomás Martín Etcheverry (United States) Alex Michelsen (Italy) Flavio Cobolli
16 Jun	Queen's Club Championships; London, United Kingdom; ATP 500; Grass – €2,683,820 – 32S/16Q/16D; Singles – Doubles	(Spain) Carlos Alcaraz; 7–5, 6–7^{(5–7)}, 6–2	(Czech Republic) Jiří Lehečka	(Spain) Roberto Bautista Agut (United Kingdom) Jack Draper	(France) Arthur Rinderknech (Denmark) Holger Rune (United Kingdom) Jacob Fearnley (United States) Brandon Nakashima
16 Jun	Queen's Club Championships; London, United Kingdom; ATP 500; Grass – €2,683,820 – 32S/16Q/16D; Singles – Doubles	(United Kingdom) Julian Cash (United Kingdom) Lloyd Glasspool; 6–3, 6–7^{(5–7)}, [10–6]	(Croatia) Nikola Mektić (New Zealand) Michael Venus	(Spain) Roberto Bautista Agut (United Kingdom) Jack Draper	(France) Arthur Rinderknech (Denmark) Holger Rune (United Kingdom) Jacob Fearnley (United States) Brandon Nakashima
23 Jun	Mallorca Championships; Santa Ponsa, Spain; ATP 250; Grass – €622,850 – 28S/16Q/16D; Singles – Doubles	(Netherlands) Tallon Griekspoor; 7–5, 7–6^{(7–3)}	(France) Corentin Moutet	(United States) Alex Michelsen (Canada) Félix Auger-Aliassime	(United States) Learner Tien (Spain) Roberto Bautista Agut (Canada) Gabriel Diallo (Serbia) Hamad Medjedovic
23 Jun	Mallorca Championships; Santa Ponsa, Spain; ATP 250; Grass – €622,850 – 28S/16Q/16D; Singles – Doubles	(Mexico) Santiago González (United States) Austin Krajicek; 6−1, 1−6, [15−13]	(India) Yuki Bhambri (United States) Robert Galloway	(United States) Alex Michelsen (Canada) Félix Auger-Aliassime	(United States) Learner Tien (Spain) Roberto Bautista Agut (Canada) Gabriel Diallo (Serbia) Hamad Medjedovic
23 Jun	Eastbourne Open; Eastbourne, United Kingdom; ATP 250; Grass – €783,690 – 28S/16Q/16D; Singles – Doubles	(United States) Taylor Fritz; 7–5, 6–1	(United States) Jenson Brooksby	(Spain) Alejandro Davidovich Fokina (France) Ugo Humbert	(United States) Marcos Giron (Czech Republic) Jakub Menšík (United Kingdom) Billy Harris (United Kingdom) Dan Evans
23 Jun	Eastbourne Open; Eastbourne, United Kingdom; ATP 250; Grass – €783,690 – 28S/16Q/16D; Singles – Doubles	(United Kingdom) Julian Cash (United Kingdom) Lloyd Glasspool; 6–4, 7–6^{(7–3)}	(Uruguay) Ariel Behar (Belgium) Joran Vliegen	(Spain) Alejandro Davidovich Fokina (France) Ugo Humbert	(United States) Marcos Giron (Czech Republic) Jakub Menšík (United Kingdom) Billy Harris (United Kingdom) Dan Evans
30 Jun; 7 Jul	Wimbledon; London, United Kingdom; Grand Slam; Grass – £24,919,000 – 128S/128Q/64D/32X; Singles – Doubles – Mixed	(Italy) Jannik Sinner; 4–6, 6–4, 6–4, 6–4	(Spain) Carlos Alcaraz	(Serbia) Novak Djokovic (United States) Taylor Fritz	(United States) Ben Shelton (Italy) Flavio Cobolli; Karen Khachanov (United Kingdom) Cameron Norrie
30 Jun; 7 Jul	Wimbledon; London, United Kingdom; Grand Slam; Grass – £24,919,000 – 128S/128Q/64D/32X; Singles – Doubles – Mixed	(United Kingdom) Julian Cash (United Kingdom) Lloyd Glasspool; 6–2, 7–6^{(7–3)}	(Australia) Rinky Hijikata (Netherlands) David Pel	(Serbia) Novak Djokovic (United States) Taylor Fritz	(United States) Ben Shelton (Italy) Flavio Cobolli; Karen Khachanov (United Kingdom) Cameron Norrie
30 Jun; 7 Jul	Wimbledon; London, United Kingdom; Grand Slam; Grass – £24,919,000 – 128S/128Q/64D/32X; Singles – Doubles – Mixed	(Netherlands) Sem Verbeek (Czech Republic) Kateřina Siniaková; 7–6^{(7–3)}, 7–6^{(7–3)}	(United Kingdom) Joe Salisbury (Brazil) Luisa Stefani	(Serbia) Novak Djokovic (United States) Taylor Fritz	(United States) Ben Shelton (Italy) Flavio Cobolli; Karen Khachanov (United Kingdom) Cameron Norrie

=== July ===
Week	Tournament	Champions	Runners-up	Semifinalists	Quarterfinalists
14 Jul	Hopman Cup; Bari, Italy; ITF Mixed Teams Championships; Hard – 6 teams (RR)	Canada; 2–1	Italy	Round robin (Group A); Greece; Spain	Round robin (Group B); Croatia; France
14 Jul	Los Cabos Open; Los Cabos, Mexico; ATP 250; Hard – $920,480 – 28S/16Q/16D; Singles – Doubles	(Canada) Denis Shapovalov; 6–4, 6–2	(United States) Aleksandar Kovacevic	Andrey Rublev (Australia) Adam Walton	(United States) Emilio Nava (Argentina) Juan Pablo Ficovich (Australia) Tristan Schoolkate (Australia) James Duckworth
14 Jul	Los Cabos Open; Los Cabos, Mexico; ATP 250; Hard – $920,480 – 28S/16Q/16D; Singles – Doubles	(United States) Robert Cash (United States) JJ Tracy; 7–6^{(7–4)}, 6–4	(Australia) Blake Bayldon (Australia) Tristan Schoolkate	Andrey Rublev (Australia) Adam Walton	(United States) Emilio Nava (Argentina) Juan Pablo Ficovich (Australia) Tristan Schoolkate (Australia) James Duckworth
14 Jul	Swedish Open; Båstad, Sweden; ATP 250; Clay (red) – €622,850 – 28S/16Q/16D; Singles – Doubles	(Italy) Luciano Darderi; 6–4, 3–6, 6–3	(Netherlands) Jesper de Jong	(Argentina) Francisco Cerúndolo (Argentina) Camilo Ugo Carabelli	(Bosnia and Herzegovina) Damir Džumhur (Argentina) Sebastián Báez (Austria) Filip Misolic (Netherlands) Tallon Griekspoor
14 Jul	Swedish Open; Båstad, Sweden; ATP 250; Clay (red) – €622,850 – 28S/16Q/16D; Singles – Doubles	(Argentina) Guido Andreozzi (Netherlands) Sander Arends; 6–7^{(4–7)}, 7–5, [10–6]	(Czech Republic) Adam Pavlásek (Poland) Jan Zieliński	(Argentina) Francisco Cerúndolo (Argentina) Camilo Ugo Carabelli	(Bosnia and Herzegovina) Damir Džumhur (Argentina) Sebastián Báez (Austria) Filip Misolic (Netherlands) Tallon Griekspoor
14 Jul	Swiss Open; Gstaad, Switzerland; ATP 250; Clay (red) – €622,850 – 28S/16Q/16D; Singles – Doubles	(Kazakhstan) Alexander Bublik; 6–4, 4–6, 6–3	(Argentina) Juan Manuel Cerúndolo	(Peru) Ignacio Buse (France) Arthur Cazaux	(Norway) Casper Ruud (Argentina) Román Andrés Burruchaga (Switzerland) Jérôme Kym (Argentina) Francisco Comesaña
14 Jul	Swiss Open; Gstaad, Switzerland; ATP 250; Clay (red) – €622,850 – 28S/16Q/16D; Singles – Doubles	(Portugal) Francisco Cabral (Austria) Lucas Miedler; 6–7^{(4–7)}, 7–6^{(7–4)}, [10–3]	(Germany) Hendrik Jebens (France) Albano Olivetti	(Peru) Ignacio Buse (France) Arthur Cazaux	(Norway) Casper Ruud (Argentina) Román Andrés Burruchaga (Switzerland) Jérôme Kym (Argentina) Francisco Comesaña
21 Jul	Washington Open; Washington, D.C., United States; ATP 500; Hard – $2,574,145 – 48S/24Q/16D; Singles – Doubles	(Australia) Alex de Minaur; 5–7, 6–1, 7–6^{(7–3)}	(Spain) Alejandro Davidovich Fokina	(United States) Ben Shelton (France) Corentin Moutet	(United States) Taylor Fritz (United States) Frances Tiafoe; Daniil Medvedev (United States) Brandon Nakashima
21 Jul	Washington Open; Washington, D.C., United States; ATP 500; Hard – $2,574,145 – 48S/24Q/16D; Singles – Doubles	(Italy) Simone Bolelli (Italy) Andrea Vavassori; 6–3, 6–4	(Monaco) Hugo Nys (France) Édouard Roger-Vasselin	(United States) Ben Shelton (France) Corentin Moutet	(United States) Taylor Fritz (United States) Frances Tiafoe; Daniil Medvedev (United States) Brandon Nakashima
21 Jul	Austrian Open; Kitzbühel, Austria; ATP 250; Clay (red) – €622,850 – 28S/16Q/16D; Singles – Doubles	(Kazakhstan) Alexander Bublik; 6–4, 6–3	(France) Arthur Cazaux	(Netherlands) Botic van de Zandschulp (France) Arthur Rinderknech	(Kazakhstan) Alexander Shevchenko (Brazil) Thiago Seyboth Wild (Germany) Jan-Lennard Struff (Germany) Yannick Hanfmann
21 Jul	Austrian Open; Kitzbühel, Austria; ATP 250; Clay (red) – €622,850 – 28S/16Q/16D; Singles – Doubles	(Czech Republic) Petr Nouza (Czech Republic) Patrik Rikl; 1–6, 7–6^{(7–3)}, [10–5]	(Austria) Neil Oberleitner (Austria) Joel Schwärzler	(Netherlands) Botic van de Zandschulp (France) Arthur Rinderknech	(Kazakhstan) Alexander Shevchenko (Brazil) Thiago Seyboth Wild (Germany) Jan-Lennard Struff (Germany) Yannick Hanfmann
21 Jul	Croatia Open; Umag, Croatia; ATP 250; Clay (red) – €622,850 – 28S/16Q/16D; Singles – Doubles	(Italy) Luciano Darderi; 6–3, 6–3	(Spain) Carlos Taberner	(Bosnia and Herzegovina) Damir Džumhur (Argentina) Camilo Ugo Carabelli	(Netherlands) Jesper de Jong (France) Titouan Droguet (Spain) Pablo Llamas Ruiz (Croatia) Dino Prižmić
21 Jul	Croatia Open; Umag, Croatia; ATP 250; Clay (red) – €622,850 – 28S/16Q/16D; Singles – Doubles	(Monaco) Romain Arneodo (France) Manuel Guinard; 7–5, 7–6^{(7–2)}	(United States) Patrik Trhac (United Kingdom) Marcus Willis	(Bosnia and Herzegovina) Damir Džumhur (Argentina) Camilo Ugo Carabelli	(Netherlands) Jesper de Jong (France) Titouan Droguet (Spain) Pablo Llamas Ruiz (Croatia) Dino Prižmić
27 Jul; 4 Aug	Canadian Open; Toronto, Canada; ATP 1000; Hard – $9,193,540 – 96S/32Q/32D; Singles – Doubles	(United States) Ben Shelton; 6–7^{(5–7)}, 6–4, 7–6^{(7–3)}	Karen Khachanov	(Germany) Alexander Zverev (United States) Taylor Fritz	(Australia) Alexei Popyrin (United States) Alex Michelsen (Australia) Alex de Minaur; Andrey Rublev
27 Jul; 4 Aug	Canadian Open; Toronto, Canada; ATP 1000; Hard – $9,193,540 – 96S/32Q/32D; Singles – Doubles	(United Kingdom) Julian Cash (United Kingdom) Lloyd Glasspool; 6–3, 6–7^{(5–7)}, [13–11]	(United Kingdom) Joe Salisbury (United Kingdom) Neal Skupski	(Germany) Alexander Zverev (United States) Taylor Fritz	(Australia) Alexei Popyrin (United States) Alex Michelsen (Australia) Alex de Minaur; Andrey Rublev

=== August ===
Week	Tournament	Champions	Runners-up	Semifinalists	Quarterfinalists
4 Aug; 11 Aug	Cincinnati Open; Mason, United States; ATP 1000; Hard – $9,193,540 – 96S/48Q/32D; Singles – Doubles	(Spain) Carlos Alcaraz; 5–0 ret.	(Italy) Jannik Sinner	(France) Térence Atmane (Germany) Alexander Zverev	(Canada) Félix Auger-Aliassime (Denmark) Holger Rune (United States) Ben Shelton; Andrey Rublev
4 Aug; 11 Aug	Cincinnati Open; Mason, United States; ATP 1000; Hard – $9,193,540 – 96S/48Q/32D; Singles – Doubles	(Croatia) Nikola Mektić (United States) Rajeev Ram; 4–6, 6–3, [10–5]	(Italy) Lorenzo Musetti (Italy) Lorenzo Sonego	(France) Térence Atmane (Germany) Alexander Zverev	(Canada) Félix Auger-Aliassime (Denmark) Holger Rune (United States) Ben Shelton; Andrey Rublev
18 Aug	Winston-Salem Open; Winston-Salem, United States; ATP 250; Hard – $828,925 – 48S/16Q/16D; Singles – Doubles	(Hungary) Márton Fucsovics; 6–3, 7–6^{(7–3)}	(Netherlands) Botic van de Zandschulp	(France) Giovanni Mpetshi Perricard (United States) Sebastian Korda	(China) Bu Yunchaokete (Serbia) Hamad Medjedovic (Serbia) Miomir Kecmanović (Spain) Jaume Munar
18 Aug	Winston-Salem Open; Winston-Salem, United States; ATP 250; Hard – $828,925 – 48S/16Q/16D; Singles – Doubles	(Brazil) Rafael Matos (Brazil) Marcelo Melo; 4–6, 6–4, [10–8]	(Portugal) Francisco Cabral (Austria) Lucas Miedler	(France) Giovanni Mpetshi Perricard (United States) Sebastian Korda	(China) Bu Yunchaokete (Serbia) Hamad Medjedovic (Serbia) Miomir Kecmanović (Spain) Jaume Munar
25 Aug; 1 Sep	US Open; New York City, United States; Grand Slam; Hard – $40,412,800 – 128S/128Q/64D/16X; Singles – Doubles – Mixed (Note: Mixed doubles competition took place on the week of 18 August)	(Spain) Carlos Alcaraz; 6–2, 3–6, 6–1, 6–4	(Italy) Jannik Sinner	(Canada) Félix Auger-Aliassime (Serbia) Novak Djokovic	(Italy) Lorenzo Musetti (Australia) Alex de Minaur (United States) Taylor Fritz (Czech Republic) Jiří Lehečka
25 Aug; 1 Sep	US Open; New York City, United States; Grand Slam; Hard – $40,412,800 – 128S/128Q/64D/16X; Singles – Doubles – Mixed	(Spain) Marcel Granollers (Argentina) Horacio Zeballos; 3–6, 7–6^{(7-4)}, 7–5	(United Kingdom) Joe Salisbury (United Kingdom) Neal Skupski	(Canada) Félix Auger-Aliassime (Serbia) Novak Djokovic	(Italy) Lorenzo Musetti (Australia) Alex de Minaur (United States) Taylor Fritz (Czech Republic) Jiří Lehečka
25 Aug; 1 Sep	US Open; New York City, United States; Grand Slam; Hard – $40,412,800 – 128S/128Q/64D/16X; Singles – Doubles – Mixed	(Italy) Sara Errani (Italy) Andrea Vavassori; 6–3, 5–7, [10–6]	(Poland) Iga Świątek (Norway) Casper Ruud	(Canada) Félix Auger-Aliassime (Serbia) Novak Djokovic	(Italy) Lorenzo Musetti (Australia) Alex de Minaur (United States) Taylor Fritz (Czech Republic) Jiří Lehečka

=== September ===
Week	Tournament	Champions	Runners-up	Semifinalists	Quarterfinalists
8 Sep	Davis Cup Qualifiers second round Groningen, Netherlands – hard (i); Sydney, Australia – hard Debrecen, Hungary – hard (i); Tokyo, Japan – hard (i); Delray Beach, United States – hard Marbella, Spain – clay Osijek, Croatia – clay (i)	Qualifying round winners Argentina; Belgium; Austria; Germany; Czech Republic; Spain; France	Qualifying round losers Netherlands; Australia; Hungary; Japan; United States; Denmark; Croatia		
15 Sep	Laver Cup; San Francisco, United States; Hard (i) – $1,500,000	Team World; 15–9	Team Europe		
15 Sep	Chengdu Open; Chengdu, China; ATP 250; Hard – $1,220,805 – 28S/16Q/16D; Singles – Doubles	(Chile) Alejandro Tabilo; 6–3, 2–6, 7–6^{(7–5)}	(Italy) Lorenzo Musetti	(Kazakhstan) Alexander Shevchenko (United States) Brandon Nakashima	(Georgia (country)) Nikoloz Basilashvili (Japan) Taro Daniel (United States) Marcos Giron (Australia) Christopher O'Connell
15 Sep	Chengdu Open; Chengdu, China; ATP 250; Hard – $1,220,805 – 28S/16Q/16D; Singles – Doubles	(Germany) Constantin Frantzen (Netherlands) Robin Haase; 4–6, 6–3, [10–7]	(United States) Vasil Kirkov (Netherlands) Bart Stevens	(Kazakhstan) Alexander Shevchenko (United States) Brandon Nakashima	(Georgia (country)) Nikoloz Basilashvili (Japan) Taro Daniel (United States) Marcos Giron (Australia) Christopher O'Connell
15 Sep	Hangzhou Open; Hangzhou, China; ATP 250; Hard – $1,049,780 – 28S/16Q/16D; Singles – Doubles	(Kazakhstan) Alexander Bublik; 7–6^{(7–4)}, 7–6^{(7–4)}	(France) Valentin Royer	(France) Corentin Moutet (China) Wu Yibing	(United States) Learner Tien (Argentina) Tomás Martín Etcheverry (Czech Republic) Dalibor Svrčina; Daniil Medvedev
15 Sep	Hangzhou Open; Hangzhou, China; ATP 250; Hard – $1,049,780 – 28S/16Q/16D; Singles – Doubles	(Portugal) Francisco Cabral (Austria) Lucas Miedler; 6–4, 6–4	(Colombia) Nicolás Barrientos (Netherlands) David Pel	(France) Corentin Moutet (China) Wu Yibing	(United States) Learner Tien (Argentina) Tomás Martín Etcheverry (Czech Republic) Dalibor Svrčina; Daniil Medvedev
22 Sep	China Open; Beijing, China; ATP 500; Hard – $4,194,080 – 32S/16Q/16D; Singles – Doubles	(Italy) Jannik Sinner; 6–2, 6–2	(United States) Learner Tien	(Australia) Alex de Minaur; Daniil Medvedev	(Hungary) Fábián Marozsán (Czech Republic) Jakub Menšík (Italy) Lorenzo Musetti (Germany) Alexander Zverev
22 Sep	China Open; Beijing, China; ATP 500; Hard – $4,194,080 – 32S/16Q/16D; Singles – Doubles	(Finland) Harri Heliövaara (United Kingdom) Henry Patten; 4–6, 6–3, [10–8]	Karen Khachanov; Andrey Rublev	(Australia) Alex de Minaur; Daniil Medvedev	(Hungary) Fábián Marozsán (Czech Republic) Jakub Menšík (Italy) Lorenzo Musetti (Germany) Alexander Zverev
22 Sep	Japan Open; Tokyo, Japan; ATP 500; Hard – $2,404,500 – 32S/16Q/16D; Singles – Doubles	(Spain) Carlos Alcaraz; 6–4, 6–4	(United States) Taylor Fritz	(Norway) Casper Ruud (United States) Jenson Brooksby	(United States) Brandon Nakashima (Australia) Aleksandar Vukic (Denmark) Holger Rune (United States) Sebastian Korda
22 Sep	Japan Open; Tokyo, Japan; ATP 500; Hard – $2,404,500 – 32S/16Q/16D; Singles – Doubles	(Monaco) Hugo Nys (France) Édouard Roger-Vasselin; 7–5, 7–5	(India) Rohan Bopanna (Japan) Takeru Yuzuki	(Norway) Casper Ruud (United States) Jenson Brooksby	(United States) Brandon Nakashima (Australia) Aleksandar Vukic (Denmark) Holger Rune (United States) Sebastian Korda
29 Sep; 6 Oct	Shanghai Masters; Shanghai, China; ATP 1000; Hard – $9,193,540 – 96S/48Q/32D; Singles – Doubles	(Monaco) Valentin Vacherot; 4–6, 6–3, 6–3	(France) Arthur Rinderknech	Daniil Medvedev (Serbia) Novak Djokovic	(Australia) Alex de Minaur (Canada) Félix Auger-Aliassime (Belgium) Zizou Bergs (Denmark) Holger Rune
29 Sep; 6 Oct	Shanghai Masters; Shanghai, China; ATP 1000; Hard – $9,193,540 – 96S/48Q/32D; Singles – Doubles	(Germany) Kevin Krawietz (Germany) Tim Pütz; 6–4, 6–4	(Sweden) André Göransson (United States) Alex Michelsen	Daniil Medvedev (Serbia) Novak Djokovic	(Australia) Alex de Minaur (Canada) Félix Auger-Aliassime (Belgium) Zizou Bergs (Denmark) Holger Rune

=== October ===
Week	Tournament	Champions	Runners-up	Semifinalists	Quarterfinalists
13 Oct	Almaty Open; Almaty, Kazakhstan; ATP 250; Hard (i) – $1,085,850 – 28S/16Q/16D; Singles – Doubles	Daniil Medvedev; 7–5, 4–6, 6–3	(France) Corentin Moutet	(United States) Alex Michelsen (Australia) James Duckworth	(Germany) Jan-Lennard Struff (Japan) Shintaro Mochizuki (Italy) Flavio Cobolli (Hungary) Fábián Marozsán
13 Oct	Almaty Open; Almaty, Kazakhstan; ATP 250; Hard (i) – $1,085,850 – 28S/16Q/16D; Singles – Doubles	(France) Théo Arribagé (France) Albano Olivetti; 6–4, 7–6^{(10–8)}	(Germany) Jakob Schnaitter (Germany) Mark Wallner	(United States) Alex Michelsen (Australia) James Duckworth	(Germany) Jan-Lennard Struff (Japan) Shintaro Mochizuki (Italy) Flavio Cobolli (Hungary) Fábián Marozsán
13 Oct	European Open; Brussels, Belgium; ATP 250; Hard (i) – €733,665 – 28S/16Q/16D; Singles – Doubles	(Canada) Félix Auger-Aliassime; 7–6^{(7–2)}, 6–7^{(6–8)}, 6–2	(Czech Republic) Jiří Lehečka	(France) Giovanni Mpetshi Perricard (Belgium) Raphaël Collignon	(Italy) Lorenzo Musetti (France) Benjamin Bonzi (Spain) Alejandro Davidovich Fokina (United States) Eliot Spizzirri
13 Oct	European Open; Brussels, Belgium; ATP 250; Hard (i) – €733,665 – 28S/16Q/16D; Singles – Doubles	(United States) Christian Harrison (United States) Evan King; 7–6^{(12–10)}, 7–6^{(7–5)}	(Monaco) Hugo Nys (France) Édouard Roger-Vasselin	(France) Giovanni Mpetshi Perricard (Belgium) Raphaël Collignon	(Italy) Lorenzo Musetti (France) Benjamin Bonzi (Spain) Alejandro Davidovich Fokina (United States) Eliot Spizzirri
13 Oct	Stockholm Open; Stockholm, Sweden; ATP 250; Hard (i) – €733,665 – 28S/16Q/16D; Singles – Doubles	(Norway) Casper Ruud; 6–2, 6–3	(France) Ugo Humbert	(Denmark) Holger Rune (Canada) Denis Shapovalov	(Argentina) Tomás Martín Etcheverry (Italy) Lorenzo Sonego (Sweden) Elias Ymer (United States) Sebastian Korda
13 Oct	Stockholm Open; Stockholm, Sweden; ATP 250; Hard (i) – €733,665 – 28S/16Q/16D; Singles – Doubles	(Austria) Alexander Erler (United States) Robert Galloway; 6–3, 6–2	(United States) Vasil Kirkov (Netherlands) Bart Stevens	(Denmark) Holger Rune (Canada) Denis Shapovalov	(Argentina) Tomás Martín Etcheverry (Italy) Lorenzo Sonego (Sweden) Elias Ymer (United States) Sebastian Korda
20 Oct	Swiss Indoors; Basel, Switzerland; ATP 500; Hard (i) – €2,684,645 – 32S/16Q/16D; Singles – Doubles	(Brazil) João Fonseca; 6–3, 6–4	(Spain) Alejandro Davidovich Fokina	(France) Ugo Humbert (Spain) Jaume Munar	(United States) Reilly Opelka (Norway) Casper Ruud (Canada) Denis Shapovalov (Canada) Félix Auger-Aliassime
20 Oct	Swiss Indoors; Basel, Switzerland; ATP 500; Hard (i) – €2,684,645 – 32S/16Q/16D; Singles – Doubles	(Spain) Marcel Granollers (Argentina) Horacio Zeballos; 6–2, 7–5	(Czech Republic) Adam Pavlásek (Poland) Jan Zieliński	(France) Ugo Humbert (Spain) Jaume Munar	(United States) Reilly Opelka (Norway) Casper Ruud (Canada) Denis Shapovalov (Canada) Félix Auger-Aliassime
20 Oct	Vienna Open; Vienna, Austria; ATP 500; Hard (i) – €2,898,475 – 32S/16Q/16D; Singles – Doubles	(Italy) Jannik Sinner; 3–6, 6–3, 7–5	(Germany) Alexander Zverev	(Australia) Alex de Minaur (Italy) Lorenzo Musetti	(Kazakhstan) Alexander Bublik (Italy) Matteo Berrettini (France) Corentin Moutet (Netherlands) Tallon Griekspoor
20 Oct	Vienna Open; Vienna, Austria; ATP 500; Hard (i) – €2,898,475 – 32S/16Q/16D; Singles – Doubles	(United Kingdom) Julian Cash (United Kingdom) Lloyd Glasspool; 6–1, 7–6^{(8–6)}	(Portugal) Francisco Cabral (Austria) Lucas Miedler	(Australia) Alex de Minaur (Italy) Lorenzo Musetti	(Kazakhstan) Alexander Bublik (Italy) Matteo Berrettini (France) Corentin Moutet (Netherlands) Tallon Griekspoor
27 Oct	Paris Masters; Nanterre, France; ATP 1000; Hard (i) – €7,703,855 – 56S/28Q/32D; Singles – Doubles	(Italy) Jannik Sinner; 6–4, 7–6^{(7–4)}	(Canada) Félix Auger-Aliassime	(Kazakhstan) Alexander Bublik (Germany) Alexander Zverev	(Monaco) Valentin Vacherot (Australia) Alex de Minaur; Daniil Medvedev (United States) Ben Shelton
27 Oct	Paris Masters; Nanterre, France; ATP 1000; Hard (i) – €7,703,855 – 56S/28Q/32D; Singles – Doubles	(Finland) Harri Heliövaara (United Kingdom) Henry Patten; 6–3, 6–4	(United Kingdom) Julian Cash (United Kingdom) Lloyd Glasspool	(Kazakhstan) Alexander Bublik (Germany) Alexander Zverev	(Monaco) Valentin Vacherot (Australia) Alex de Minaur; Daniil Medvedev (United States) Ben Shelton

=== November ===
Week	Tournament	Champions	Runners-up	Semifinalists	Quarterfinalists
3 Nov	Hellenic Championship; Athens, Greece; ATP 250; Hard (i) – €793,530 – 28S/16Q/16D; Singles – Doubles	(Serbia) Novak Djokovic; 4–6, 6–3, 7–5	(Italy) Lorenzo Musetti	(Germany) Yannick Hanfmann (United States) Sebastian Korda	(Portugal) Nuno Borges (United States) Marcos Giron (Serbia) Miomir Kecmanović (France) Alexandre Müller
3 Nov	Hellenic Championship; Athens, Greece; ATP 250; Hard (i) – €793,530 – 28S/16Q/16D; Singles – Doubles	(Portugal) Francisco Cabral (Austria) Lucas Miedler; 4–6, 6–3, [10–3]	(Mexico) Santiago González (Netherlands) David Pel	(Germany) Yannick Hanfmann (United States) Sebastian Korda	(Portugal) Nuno Borges (United States) Marcos Giron (Serbia) Miomir Kecmanović (France) Alexandre Müller
3 Nov	Moselle Open; Metz, France; ATP 250; Hard (i) – €622,850 – 28S/16Q/16D; Singles – Doubles	(United States) Learner Tien; 6–3, 3–6, 7–6^{(8–6)}	(United Kingdom) Cameron Norrie	(Italy) Lorenzo Sonego (Ukraine) Vitaliy Sachko	(France) Kyrian Jacquet (Germany) Daniel Altmaier (France) Clément Tabur (Italy) Matteo Berrettini
3 Nov	Moselle Open; Metz, France; ATP 250; Hard (i) – €622,850 – 28S/16Q/16D; Singles – Doubles	(France) Quentin Halys (France) Pierre-Hugues Herbert; 7–5, 6–3	(Argentina) Guido Andreozzi (France) Manuel Guinard	(Italy) Lorenzo Sonego (Ukraine) Vitaliy Sachko	(France) Kyrian Jacquet (Germany) Daniel Altmaier (France) Clément Tabur (Italy) Matteo Berrettini
10 Nov	ATP Finals; Turin, Italy; ATP Finals; Hard (i) – $15,500,000 – 8S/8D (RR); Singles – Doubles	(Italy) Jannik Sinner; 7–6^{(7–4)}, 7–5	(Spain) Carlos Alcaraz	(Canada) Félix Auger-Aliassime (Australia) Alex de Minaur	Round robin (United States) Taylor Fritz (Italy) Lorenzo Musetti (Germany) Alexander Zverev (United States) Ben Shelton
10 Nov	ATP Finals; Turin, Italy; ATP Finals; Hard (i) – $15,500,000 – 8S/8D (RR); Singles – Doubles	(Finland) Harri Heliövaara (United Kingdom) Henry Patten; 7–5, 6–3	(United Kingdom) Joe Salisbury (United Kingdom) Neal Skupski	(Canada) Félix Auger-Aliassime (Australia) Alex de Minaur	Round robin (United States) Taylor Fritz (Italy) Lorenzo Musetti (Germany) Alexander Zverev (United States) Ben Shelton
17 Nov	Davis Cup Final 8 Bologna, Italy; Hard (i) – $7,000,000 – 8 teams	Italy; 2–0	Spain	Belgium; Germany	Austria; France; Czech Republic; Argentina

=== December ===
Week	Tournament	Champions	Runners-up	Semifinalists	Quarterfinalists
15 Dec	Next Gen ATP Finals; Jeddah, Saudi Arabia; Next Gen ATP Finals; Hard (i) – $2,101,250 – 8S (RR); Singles	(United States) Learner Tien; 4–3^{(7–4)}, 4–2, 4–1	(Belgium) Alexander Blockx	(United States) Nishesh Basavareddy (Norway) Nicolai Budkov Kjær	Round robin (Spain) Rafael Jódar (Spain) Martín Landaluce (Croatia) Dino Prižmić (Germany) Justin Engel

=== Cancelled tournaments ===
Week of	Tournament	Status
3 Nov	Belgrade Open; Belgrade, Serbia; ATP Tour 250; Hard (i)	Cancelled; tournament moved to Athens

== Statistical information ==
These tables present the number of singles (S), doubles (D), and mixed doubles (X) titles won by each player and each nation during the season, within all the tournament categories of the 2025 calendar: the Grand Slam tournaments, the ATP Finals, the ATP Masters 1000, the ATP 500 tournaments, and the ATP 250 tournaments. The players/nations are sorted by:

1. Total number of titles (a doubles title won by two players representing the same nation counts as only one win for the nation);
2. Cumulated importance of those titles (one Grand Slam win equalling two Masters 1000 wins, one undefeated ATP Finals win equalling one-and-a-half Masters 1000 win, one Masters 1000 win equalling two 500 events wins, one 500 event win equalling two 250 events wins);
3. A singles > doubles > mixed doubles hierarchy;
4. Alphabetical order (by family names for players).

Key
Grand Slam
ATP Finals
ATP 1000
ATP 500
ATP 250

=== Titles won by player ===
Total	Player	Grand Slam			ATP Finals		ATP 1000			ATP 500		ATP 250		Total		
Total	Player	S	D	X	S	D	S	D	X	S	D	S	D	S	D	X
8	Carlos Alcaraz (ESP)	● ●					● ● ●			● ● ●				8	0	0
7	Andrea Vavassori (ITA)			● ●					●		● ● ●		●	0	4	3
7	Julian Cash (GBR)		●					●			● ● ●		● ●	0	7	0
7	Lloyd Glasspool (GBR)		●					●			● ● ●		● ●	0	7	0
6	Jannik Sinner (ITA)	● ●			●		●			● ●				6	0	0
5	Marcel Granollers (ESP)		● ●					●			●		●	0	5	0
5	Horacio Zeballos (ARG)		● ●					●			●		●	0	5	0
4	Harri Heliövaara (FIN)		●			●		●			●			0	4	0
4	Henry Patten (GBR)		●			●		●			●			0	4	0
4	Simone Bolelli (ITA)										● ● ●		●	0	4	0
4	Alexander Bublik (KAZ)									●		● ● ●		4	0	0
3	Marcelo Arévalo (ESA)							● ● ●						0	3	0
3	Mate Pavić (CRO)							● ● ●						0	3	0
3	Christian Harrison (USA)										● ●		●	0	3	0
3	Evan King (USA)										● ●		●	0	3	0
3	Sander Arends (NED)										●		● ●	0	3	0
3	Félix Auger-Aliassime (CAN)											● ● ●		3	0	0
3	Luciano Darderi (ITA)											● ● ●		3	0	0
3	Francisco Cabral (POR)												● ● ●	0	3	0
3	Lucas Miedler (AUT)												● ● ●	0	3	0
2	Sem Verbeek (NED)			●							●			0	1	1
2	Kevin Krawietz (GER)							●			●			0	2	0
2	Tim Pütz (GER)							●			●			0	2	0
2	Casper Ruud (NOR)						●					●		2	0	0
2	Romain Arneodo (MON)							●					●	0	2	0
2	Manuel Guinard (FRA)							●					●	0	2	0
2	Nikola Mektić (CRO)							●					●	0	2	0
2	Flavio Cobolli (ITA)									●		●		2	0	0
2	João Fonseca (BRA)									●		●		2	0	0
2	Denis Shapovalov (CAN)									●		●		2	0	0
2	Luke Johnson (GBR)										●		●	0	2	0
2	Rafael Matos (BRA)										●		●	0	2	0
2	Marcelo Melo (BRA)										●		●	0	2	0
2	Novak Djokovic (SRB)											● ●		2	0	0
2	Taylor Fritz (USA)											● ●		2	0	0
2	Miomir Kecmanović (SRB)											●	●	1	1	0
2	Guido Andreozzi (ARG)												● ●	0	2	0
2	Théo Arribagé (FRA)												● ●	0	2	0
2	Santiago González (MEX)												● ●	0	2	0
2	Robin Haase (NED)												● ●	0	2	0
2	Pierre-Hugues Herbert (FRA)												● ●	0	2	0
2	Austin Krajicek (USA)												● ●	0	2	0
2	Petr Nouza (CZE)												● ●	0	2	0
2	Patrik Rikl (CZE)												● ●	0	2	0
1	John Peers (AUS)			●										0	0	1
1	Jack Draper (GBR)						●							1	0	0
1	Jakub Menšík (CZE)						●							1	0	0
1	Ben Shelton (USA)						●							1	0	0
1	Valentin Vacherot (MON)						●							1	0	0
1	Rajeev Ram (USA)							●						0	1	0
1	Sebastián Báez (ARG)									●				1	0	0
1	Alex de Minaur (AUS)									●				1	0	0
1	Tomáš Macháč (CZE)									●				1	0	0
1	Andrey Rublev (Note: As of 1 March 2022, the ATP announced that players from Russia and Belarus will not compete in tournaments under the name or flag of Russia or Belarus due to the Russian invasion of Ukraine.)									●				1	0	0
1	Holger Rune (DEN)									●				1	0	0
1	Stefanos Tsitsipas (GRE)									●				1	0	0
1	Alexander Zverev (GER)									●				1	0	0
1	Yuki Bhambri (IND)										●			0	1	0
1	André Göransson (SWE)										●			0	1	0
1	Hugo Nys (MON)										●			0	1	0
1	Alexei Popyrin (AUS)										●			0	1	0
1	Édouard Roger-Vasselin (FRA)										●			0	1	0
1	Jenson Brooksby (USA)											●		1	0	0
1	Gabriel Diallo (CAN)											●		1	0	0
1	Laslo Djere (SRB)											●		1	0	0
1	Márton Fucsovics (HUN)											●		1	0	0
1	Tallon Griekspoor (NED)											●		1	0	0
1	Ugo Humbert (FRA)											●		1	0	0
1	Jiří Lehečka (CZE)											●		1	0	0
1	Daniil Medvedev											●		1	0	0
1	Gaël Monfils (FRA)											●		1	0	0
1	Alexandre Müller (FRA)											●		1	0	0
1	Alejandro Tabilo (CHI)											●		1	0	0
1	Learner Tien (USA)											●		1	0	0
1	Nicolás Barrientos (COL)												●	0	1	0
1	Rithvik Choudary Bollipalli (IND)												●	0	1	0
1	Benjamin Bonzi (FRA)												●	0	1	0
1	Robert Cash (USA)												●	0	1	0
1	Sadio Doumbia (FRA)												●	0	1	0
1	Matthew Ebden (AUS)												●	0	1	0
1	Alexander Erler (AUT)												●	0	1	0
1	Constantin Frantzen (GER)												●	0	1	0
1	Robert Galloway (USA)												●	0	1	0
1	Quentin Halys (FRA)												●	0	1	0
1	Brandon Nakashima (USA)												●	0	1	0
1	Albano Olivetti (FRA)												●	0	1	0
1	Fabien Reboul (FRA)												●	0	1	0
1	Fernando Romboli (BRA)												●	0	1	0
1	John-Patrick Smith (AUS)												●	0	1	0
1	Jordan Thompson (AUS)												●	0	1	0
1	JJ Tracy (USA)												●	0	1	0
1	Botic van de Zandschulp (NED)												●	0	1	0
1	Michael Venus (NZL)												●	0	1	0

=== Titles won by nation ===
Total	Nation	Grand Slam			ATP Finals		ATP 1000			ATP 500		ATP 250		Total		
Total	Nation	S	D	X	S	D	S	D	X	S	D	S	D	S	D	X
18	Italy (ITA)	2		2	1		1		1	3	3	4	1	11	4	3
14	Great Britain (GBR)		2			1	1	2			5		3	1	13	0
14	United States (USA)						1	1			2	4	6	5	9	0
13	Spain (ESP)	2	2				3	1		3	1		1	8	5	0
11	France (FRA)							1			1	3	6	3	8	0
8	Argentina (ARG)		2					1		1	1		3	1	7	0
8	Netherlands (NED)			1							2	1	4	1	6	1
6	Canada (CAN)									1		5		6	0	0
5	Croatia (CRO)							4					1	0	5	0
5	Australia (AUS)			1						1	1		2	1	3	1
5	Czech Republic (CZE)						1			1		1	2	3	2	0
5	Brazil (BRA)									1	1	1	2	2	3	0
5	Serbia (SRB)											4	1	4	1	0
4	Finland (FIN)		1			1		1			1			0	4	0
4	Monaco (MON)						1	1			1		1	1	3	0
4	Germany (GER)							1		1	1		1	1	3	0
4	Kazakhstan (KAZ)									1		3		4	0	0
4	Austria (AUT)												4	0	4	0
3	El Salvador (ESA)							3						0	3	0
3	Portugal (POR)												3	0	3	0
2	Norway (NOR)						1					1		2	0	0
2	India (IND)										1		1	0	2	0
2	Mexico (MEX)												2	0	2	0
1	Denmark (DEN)									1				1	0	0
1	Greece (GRE)									1				1	0	0
1	Sweden (SWE)										1			0	1	0
1	Chile (CHI)											1		1	0	0
1	Hungary (HUN)											1		1	0	0
1	Colombia (COL)												1	0	1	0
1	New Zealand (NZL)												1	0	1	0

=== Titles information ===
The following players won their first main circuit title in singles, doubles, or mixed doubles:

Singles

- (France) Alexandre Müller (27 years, 11 months and 4 days) – Hong Kong (draw)
- (Brazil) João Fonseca (18 years, 5 months and 26 days) – Buenos Aires (draw)
- (Czech Republic) Tomáš Macháč (24 years, 4 months and 16 days) – Acapulco (draw)
- (Czech Republic) Jakub Menšík (19 years, 6 months and 29 days) – Miami (draw)
- (Italy) Flavio Cobolli (22 years and 11 months) – Bucharest (draw)
- (United States) Jenson Brooksby (24 years, 5 months and 11 days) – Houston (draw)
- (Canada) Gabriel Diallo (23 years, 8 months and 22 days) – 's-Hertogenbosch (draw)
- (Monaco) Valentin Vacherot (26 years, 10 months and 26 days) – Shanghai (draw)
- (United States) Learner Tien (19 years, 11 months and 6 days) – Metz (draw)

Doubles

- (United States) Christian Harrison (30 years, 8 months and 11 days) – Dallas (draw)
- (United States) Evan King (32 years, 10 months and 15 days) – Dallas (draw)
- (France) Benjamin Bonzi (28 years, 8 months and 7 days) – Marseille (draw)
- (France) Théo Arribagé (24 years, 4 months and 7 days) – Buenos Aires (draw)
- (United States) Brandon Nakashima (23 years, 6 months and 13 days) – Delray Beach (draw)
- (Australia) Alexei Popyrin (25 years, 6 months and 24 days) – Dubai (draw)
- (Czech Republic) Petr Nouza (26 years, 6 months and 27 days) – Marrakesh (draw)
- (Czech Republic) Patrik Rikl (26 years, 2 months and 30 days) – Marrakesh (draw)
- (France) Manuel Guinard (29 years, 4 months and 28 days) – Monte-Carlo (draw)
- (United States) Robert Cash (24 years, 4 months and 12 days) – Los Cabos (draw)
- (United States) JJ Tracy (23 years and 9 days) – Los Cabos (draw)
- (Germany) Constantin Frantzen (27 years, 6 months and 7 days) – Chengdu (draw)
- (France) Quentin Halys (29 years and 13 days) – Metz (draw)

Mixed

- (Netherlands) Sem Verbeek (31 years, 2 months and 28 days) – **Wimbledon** (draw)

The following players defended a main circuit title in singles, doubles, or mixed doubles:

Singles

- (Italy) Jannik Sinner – **Australian Open (draw)**, **ATP Finals (draw)**
- (France) Ugo Humbert – Marseille (draw)
- (Argentina) Sebastián Báez – Rio de Janeiro (draw)
- (Spain) Carlos Alcaraz – **French Open (draw)**
- (United States) Taylor Fritz – Eastbourne (draw)

Doubles

- (United Kingdom) Lloyd Glasspool – Brisbane (draw)
- (Croatia) Nikola Mektić – Auckland (draw)
- (Brazil) Rafael Matos – Rio de Janeiro (draw)

Mixed

- (Italy) Andrea Vavassori – **US Open (draw)**

=== Best ranking ===
The following players achieved their career-high ranking in this season inside top 50 (in bold the players who entered the top 10 or became the world No. 1 for the first time): (Note: Name and ranking in bold means the player entered the top 10 or became world No. 1 for the first time this year, and only the ranking in bold means the player had entered the top 10 in a previous season (before 2024) but reached a new career-high ranking this year.)

Singles

- (France) Giovanni Mpetshi Perricard (reached place No. 29 on February 24)
- (Spain) Pedro Martínez (reached place No. 36 on February 24)
- (Czech Republic) Tomáš Macháč (reached place No. 20 on March 3)
- (France) Arthur Fils (reached place No. 14 on April 14)
- (Argentina) Francisco Cerúndolo (reached place No. 18 on May 5)
- (United States) Brandon Nakashima (reached place No. 29 on May 5)
- (United Kingdom) **Jack Draper** (reached place **No. 4** on June 9)
- (Italy) **Lorenzo Musetti** (reached place **No. 6** on June 9)
- (United States) **Tommy Paul** (reached place **No. 8** on June 9)
- (United Kingdom) Jacob Fearnley (reached place No. 49 on June 9)
- (France) Quentin Halys (reached place No. 46 on June 30)
- (United States) Alex Michelsen (reached place No. 30 on July 14)
- (Italy) Flavio Cobolli (reached place No. 17 on July 28)
- (Australia) Alexei Popyrin (reached place No. 19 on August 4)
- (Czech Republic) Jakub Menšík (reached place No. 16 on August 18)
- (Canada) Gabriel Diallo (reached place No. 33 on August 18)
- (France) Alexandre Müller (reached place No. 38 on August 18)
- (Argentina) Camilo Ugo Carabelli (reached place No. 43 on August 18)
- (Czech Republic) Jiří Lehečka (reached place No. 16 on September 8)
- (Belgium) Zizou Bergs (reached place No. 39 on October 13)
- (France) Arthur Rinderknech (reached place No. 27 on October 20)
- (Spain) Alejandro Davidovich Fokina (reached place No. 14 on November 3)
- (Brazil) João Fonseca (reached place No. 24 on November 3)
- (Monaco) Valentin Vacherot (reached place No. 30 on November 3)
- (France) Corentin Moutet (reached place No. 31 on November 3)
- (Germany) Daniel Altmaier (reached place No. 46 on November 3)
- (United States) **Ben Shelton** (reached place **No. 5** on November 10)
- (Kazakhstan) Alexander Bublik (reached place No. 11 on November 10)
- (United States) Learner Tien (reached place No. 28 on November 10)
- (Canada) Félix Auger-Aliassime (reached place **No. 5** on November 17)
- (Italy) Luciano Darderi (reached place No. 25 on December 29)
- (Spain) Jaume Munar (reached place No. 33 on December 29)

Doubles

- (Italy) Simone Bolelli (reached place **No. 6** on January 13)
- (United Kingdom) **Henry Patten** (reached place **No. 3** on January 27)
- (United States) Nathaniel Lammons (reached place No. 17 on January 27)
- (Germany) Kevin Krawietz (reached place **No. 5** on February 10)
- (United States) Robert Galloway (reached place No. 25 on February 10)
- (Germany) Tim Pütz (reached place **No. 6** on February 17)
- (Finland) Harri Heliövaara (reached place **No. 3** on March 31)
- (United States) Sebastian Korda (reached place No. 46 on March 31)
- (Netherlands) Sem Verbeek (reached place No. 29 on May 19)
- (France) Fabien Reboul (reached place No. 22 on May 26)
- (Germany) Constantin Frantzen (reached place No. 42 on June 9)
- (Netherlands) Sander Arends (reached place No. 23 on July 21)
- (United Kingdom) Luke Johnson (reached place No. 28 on July 21)
- (United Kingdom) **Lloyd Glasspool** (reached place **No. 1** on August 18)
- (United Kingdom) **Julian Cash** (reached place **No. 2** on August 18)
- (France) Théo Arribagé (reached place No. 48 on August 18)
- (Monaco) Romain Arneodo (reached place No. 38 on August 25)
- (Brazil) Fernando Romboli (reached place No. 40 on September 8)
- (France) Sadio Doumbia (reached place No. 23 on September 15)
- (India) Yuki Bhambri (reached place No. 21 on October 13)
- (United States) Robert Cash (reached place No. 36 on October 13)
- (Sweden) André Göransson (reached place No. 20 on October 27)
- (Argentina) Guido Andreozzi (reached place No. 28 on October 27)
- (United States) Christian Harrison (reached place No. 15 on November 3)
- (United States) Evan King (reached place No. 16 on November 3)
- (Portugal) Francisco Cabral (reached place No. 20 on November 3)
- (United States) JJ Tracy (reached place No. 31 on November 3)
- (Austria) Lucas Miedler (reached place No. 23 on November 10)
- (France) Manuel Guinard (reached place No. 23 on December 29)
- (Netherlands) David Pel (reached place No. 27 on December 29)
- (Australia) John-Patrick Smith (reached place No. 41 on December 29)
- (Germany) Jakob Schnaitter (reached place No. 45 on December 29)
- (Germany) Mark Wallner (reached place No. 45 on December 29)

== ATP rankings ==
=== Singles ===
Final Singles Race rankings
No.	Player	Points	Tourn
1	Carlos Alcaraz (ESP)	11,050	15
2	**Jannik Sinner** (ITA)	10,000	11
3	Alexander Zverev (GER)	4,960	23
4	Novak Djokovic (SRB)	4,830	13
5	Ben Shelton (USA)	3,970	22
6	Taylor Fritz (USA)	3,935	22
7	Alex de Minaur (AUS)	3,935	22
8	Félix Auger-Aliassime (CAN)	3,845	26
9	Lorenzo Musetti (ITA)	3,840	21
10	Jack Draper (GBR)	2,990	11
11	Alexander Bublik (KAZ)	2,870	23
12	Casper Ruud (NOR)	2,835	20
13	Daniil Medvedev	2,760	24
14	Alejandro Davidovich Fokina (ESP)	2,635	26
15	Holger Rune (DEN)	2,580	20
16	Andrey Rublev	2,520	27
17	Jiří Lehečka (CZE)	2,325	22
18	Karen Khachanov	2,320	22
19	Jakub Menšík (CZE)	2,150	21
20	Francisco Cerúndolo (ARG)	2,085	19

Year-end rankings 2025 (29 December 2025)
#	Player	Points	#Trn	'24 Rk	High	Low	'24→'25
1	Carlos Alcaraz (ESP)	12,050	19	3	1	3	▲2
2	Jannik Sinner (ITA)	11,500	18	1	1	2	▼1
3	Alexander Zverev (GER)	5,110	24	2	2	3	▼1
4	Novak Djokovic (SRB)	4,820	20	7	4	7	▲3
5	Félix Auger-Aliassime (CAN)	4,190	28	29	5	30	▲24
6	Taylor Fritz (USA)	4,085	23	4	4	7	▼2
7	Alex de Minaur (AUS)	4,080	23	9	6	13	▲2
8	Lorenzo Musetti (ITA)	3,990	23	17	6	17	▲9
9	Ben Shelton (USA)	3,960	23	21	5	21	▲12
10	Jack Draper (GBR)	2,990	17	15	4	18	▲5
11	Alexander Bublik (KAZ)	2,845	29	33	11	82	▲22
12	Casper Ruud (NOR)	2,825	21	6	5	16	▼6
13	Daniil Medvedev	2,710	24	5	5	18	▼8
14	Alejandro Davidovich Fokina (ESP)	2,585	26	61	14	68	▲47
15	Holger Rune (DEN)	2,580	21	13	8	15	▼2
16	Andrey Rublev	2,510	26	8	8	17	▼8
17	Karen Khachanov	2,320	24	19	9	27	▲2
18	Jiří Lehečka (CZE)	2,315	23	28	16	38	▲10
19	Jakub Menšík (CZE)	2,150	23	48	16	57	▲29
20	Tommy Paul (USA)	2,050	20	12	8	20	▼8

==== No. 1 ranking ====
Holder	Date gained	Date forfeited
Jannik Sinner (ITA)	**Year end 2024**	7 September 2025
Carlos Alcaraz (ESP)	8 September 2025	2 November 2025
Jannik Sinner (ITA)	3 November 2025	9 November 2025
Carlos Alcaraz (ESP)	10 November 2025	**Year end 2025**

=== Doubles ===
Final Doubles Race rankings
No.	Team	Points	Tourn
1	Julian Cash (GBR); Lloyd Glasspool (GBR)	8,345	23
2	**Harri Heliövaara** (FIN); **Henry Patten** (GBR)	7,040	22
3	Marcel Granollers (ESP); Horacio Zeballos (ARG)	6,825	13
4	Marcelo Arévalo (ESA); Mate Pavić (CRO)	6,705	20
5	Joe Salisbury (GBR); Neal Skupski (GBR)	5,670	22
6	Kevin Krawietz (GER); Tim Pütz (GER)	4,785	19
7	Simone Bolelli (ITA); Andrea Vavassori (ITA)	4,150	24
8	Christian Harrison (USA); Evan King (USA)	3,830	27
9	Hugo Nys (MON); Édouard Roger-Vasselin (FRA)	3,620	21
10	Sadio Doumbia (FRA); Fabien Reboul (FRA)	2,925	35

**Champions** in bold
Runners-up in italics

Qualified for the ATP Finals.

Year-end rankings 2025 (29 December 2025)
#	Player	Points	#Trn	'24 Rk	High	Low	'24→'25
1	Lloyd Glasspool (GBR)	8,520	23	23	1	23	▲22
2	Julian Cash (GBR)	8,370	24	37	2	37	▲35
3	Harri Heliövaara (FIN)	7,800	23	16	3	16	▲13
=	Henry Patten (GBR)	7,800	23	14	3	14	▲11
5	Horacio Zeballos (ARG)	7,115	18	4	3	11	▼1
6	Marcel Granollers (ESP)	7,025	15	4	4	14	▼2
7	Marcelo Arévalo (ESA)	6,770	21	1	1	7	▼6
=	Mate Pavić (CRO)	6,770	21	1	1	7	▼6
9	Neal Skupski (GBR)	6,580	26	18	9	18	▲9
10	Joe Salisbury (GBR)	6,490	23	33	10	33	▲23
11	Kevin Krawietz (GER)	4,940	20	7	5	12	▼4
=	Tim Pütz (GER)	4,940	20	9	6	13	▼2
13	Simone Bolelli (ITA)	4,370	25	11	6	14	▼2
14	Andrea Vavassori (ITA)	4,370	27	10	6	15	▼4
15	Christian Harrison (USA)	3,890	32	84	15	84	▲69
16	Evan King (USA)	3,830	32	77	16	81	▲61
17	Édouard Roger-Vasselin (FRA)	3,530	23	40	16	40	▲23
18	Hugo Nys (MON)	3,450	26	24	18	39	▲6
19	Nikola Mektić (CRO)	3,350	26	6	6	19	▼13
20	Francisco Cabral (POR)	3,105	31	76	20	76	▲56

==== No. 1 ranking ====
Holder	Date gained	Date forfeited
Marcelo Arévalo (ESA); Mate Pavić (CRO)	**Year end 2024**	17 August 2025
Lloyd Glasspool (GBR)	18 August 2025	**Year end 2025**

== Point distribution ==
Points are awarded as follows:

Category	W	F	SF	QF	R16	R32	R64	R128	Q	Q3	Q2	Q1
Grand Slam (128S)	2000	1300	800	400	200	100	50	10	30	16	8	0
Grand Slam (64D)	2000	1200	720	360	180	90	0	–	25	–	0	0
ATP Finals (8S/8D)	1500 (max); 1100 (min)	1000 (max); 600 (min)	600 (max); 200 (min)	200 for each round robin match win, +400 for a semifinal win, +500 for the final win.								
ATP 1000 (96S)	1000	650	400	200	100	50	30	10	20	–	10	0
ATP 1000 (56S)	1000	650	400	200	100	50	10	–	30	–	16	0
ATP 1000 (32D)	1000	600	360	180	90	0	–	–	–	–	–	–
ATP 500 (48S)	500	330	200	100	50	25	0	–	16	–	8	0
ATP 500 (32S)	500	330	200	100	50	0	–	–	25	–	13	0
ATP 500 (16D)	500	300	180	90	0	–	–	–	45	–	25	0
ATP 250 (48S)	250	165	100	50	25	13	0	–	8	–	4	0
ATP 250 (32S/28S)	250	165	100	50	25	0	–	–	13	–	7	0
ATP 250 (16D)	250	150	90	45	0	–	–	–	–	–	–	–
United Cup	500 (max)	For details, see 2025 United Cup										

== Prize money leaders ==
Prize money in US$ as of 29 December 2025
No.	Player	Singles	Doubles	Year-to-date
1	(Spain) Carlos Alcaraz	$21,354,778	$0	$21,354,778
2	(Italy) Jannik Sinner	$19,114,396	$6,245	$19,120,641
3	(Germany) Alexander Zverev	$7,384,324	$83,906	$7,468,230
4	(Australia) Alex de Minaur	$6,616,603	$49,484	$6,666,087
5	(Italy) Lorenzo Musetti	$6,176,026	$169,614	$6,345,640
6	(United States) Taylor Fritz	$5,919,347	$19,192	$5,938,539
7	(Canada) Félix Auger-Aliassime	$5,786,377	$33,654	$5,820,031
8	(United States) Ben Shelton	$5,528,128	$144,606	$5,672,734
9	(Serbia) Novak Djokovic	$5,127,245	$12,930	$5,140,175
10	(Norway) Casper Ruud	$3,947,549	$23,825	$3,971,374

== Best matches by ATPTour.com ==
=== Best 5 Grand Slam tournament matches ===
	Event	Round	Surface	Winner	Opponent	Result
1.	French Open	F	Clay	(Spain) Carlos Alcaraz	(Italy) Jannik Sinner	4–6, 6–7^{(4–7)}, 6–4, 7–6^{(7–3)}, 7–6^{(10–2)}
2.	Australian Open	QF	Hard	(Serbia) Novak Djokovic	(Spain) Carlos Alcaraz	4–6, 6–4, 6–3, 6–4
3.	French Open	R2	Clay	(France) Arthur Fils	(Spain) Jaume Munar	7–6^{(7–3)}, 7–6^{(7–4)}, 2–6, 0–6, 6–4
4.	US Open	R1	Hard	(France) Benjamin Bonzi	Daniil Medvedev	6–3, 7–5, 6–7^{(5–7)}, 0–6, 6–4
5.	Wimbledon	R4	Grass	(United Kingdom) Cameron Norrie	(Chile) Nicolás Jarry	6–3, 7–6^{(7–4)}, 6–7^{(7–9)}, 6–7^{(5–7)}, 6–3

=== Best 5 ATP Tour matches ===
	Event	Round	Surface	Winner	Opponent	Result
1.	Hellenic Championship	F	Hard (i)	(Serbia) Novak Djokovic	(Italy) Lorenzo Musetti	4–6, 6–3, 7–5
2.	Vienna Open	F	Hard (i)	(Italy) Jannik Sinner	(Germany) Alexander Zverev	3–6, 6–3, 7–5
3.	Washington Open	QF	Hard	(France) Corentin Moutet	Daniil Medvedev	1–6, 6–4, 6–4
4.	Monte-Carlo Masters	QF	Clay	(Spain) Carlos Alcaraz	(France) Arthur Fils	4–6, 7–5, 6–3
5.	Miami Open	R3	Hard	(Australia) Alex de Minaur	(Brazil) João Fonseca	5–7, 7–5, 6–3

== Retirements ==
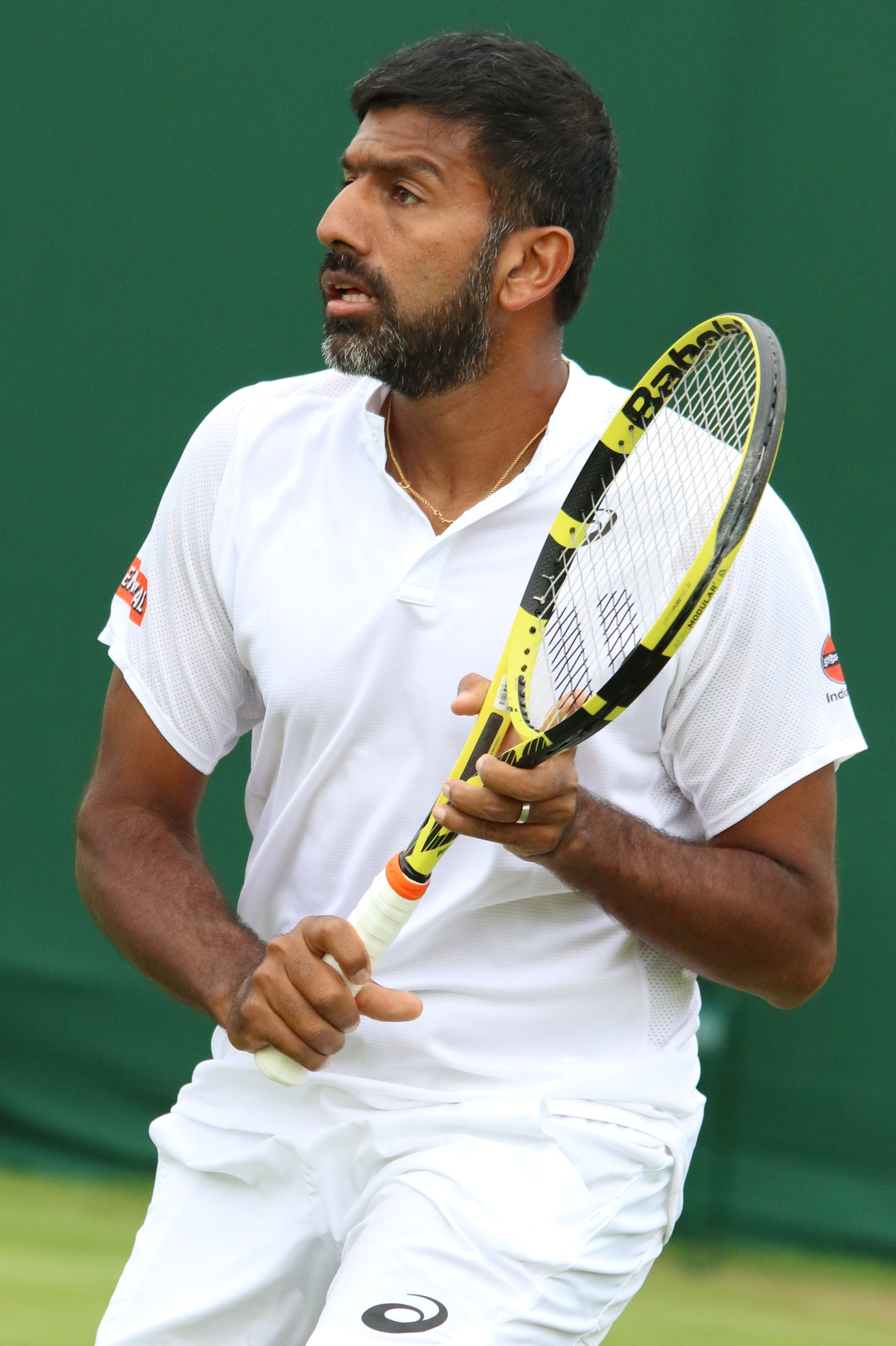
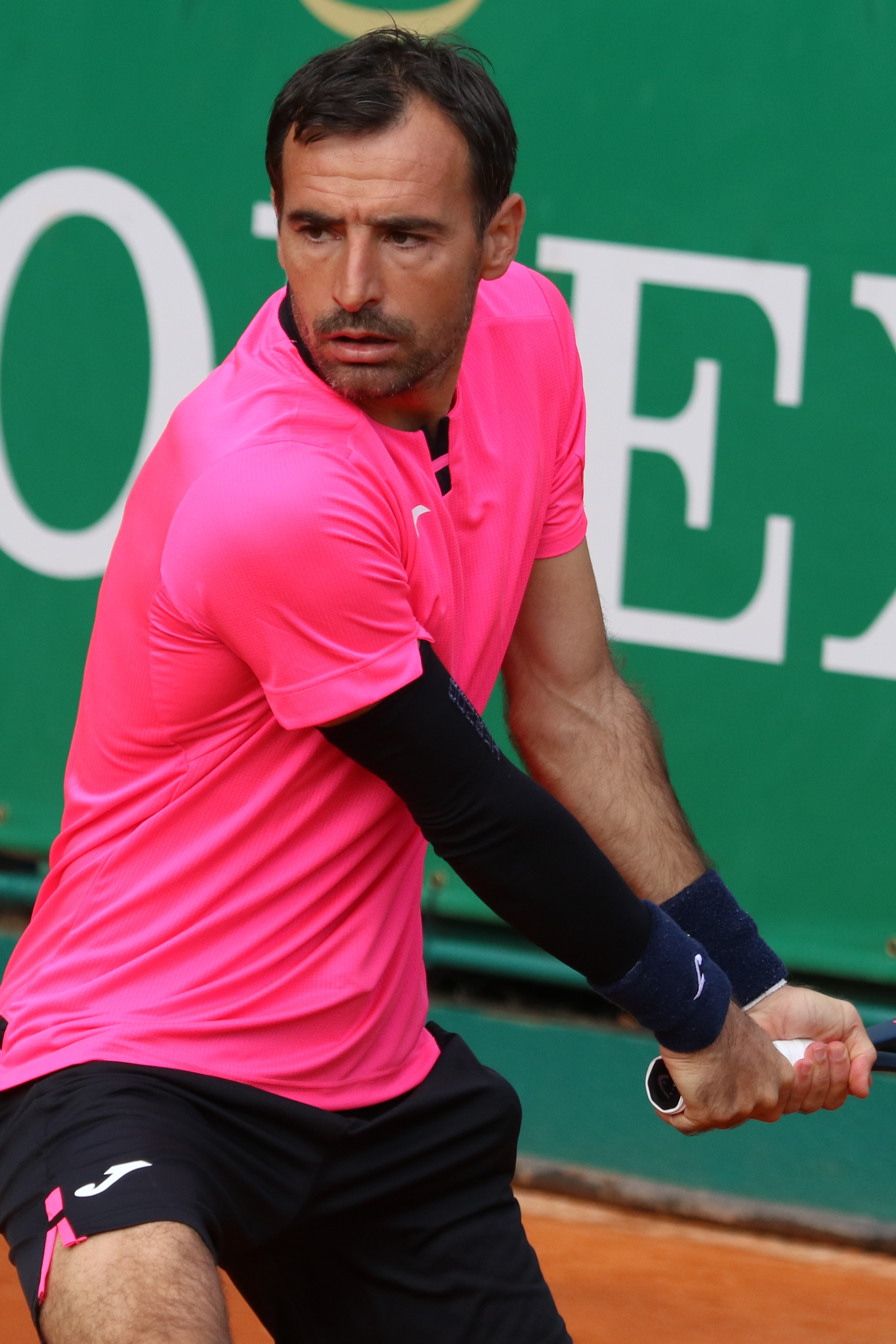
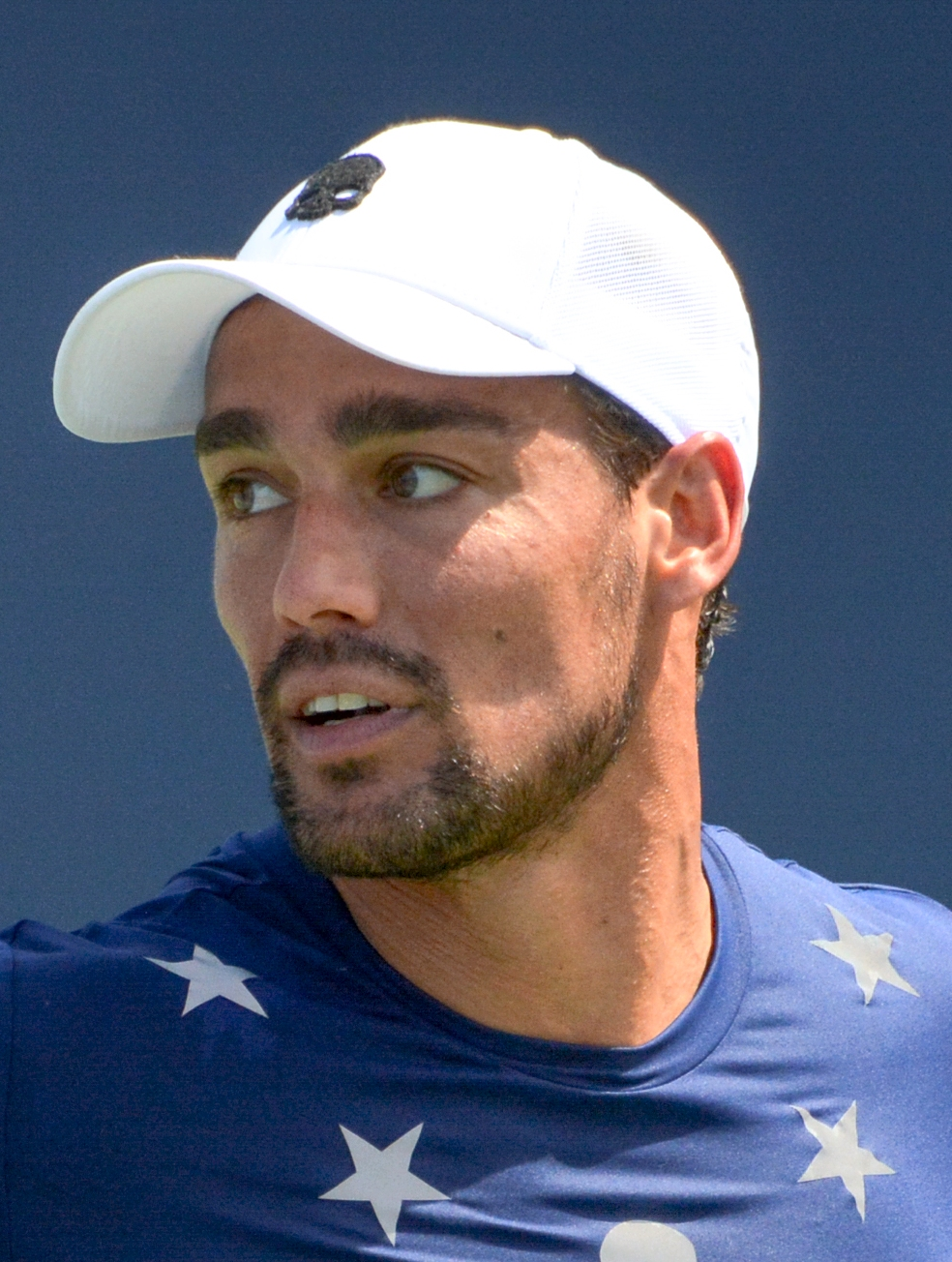
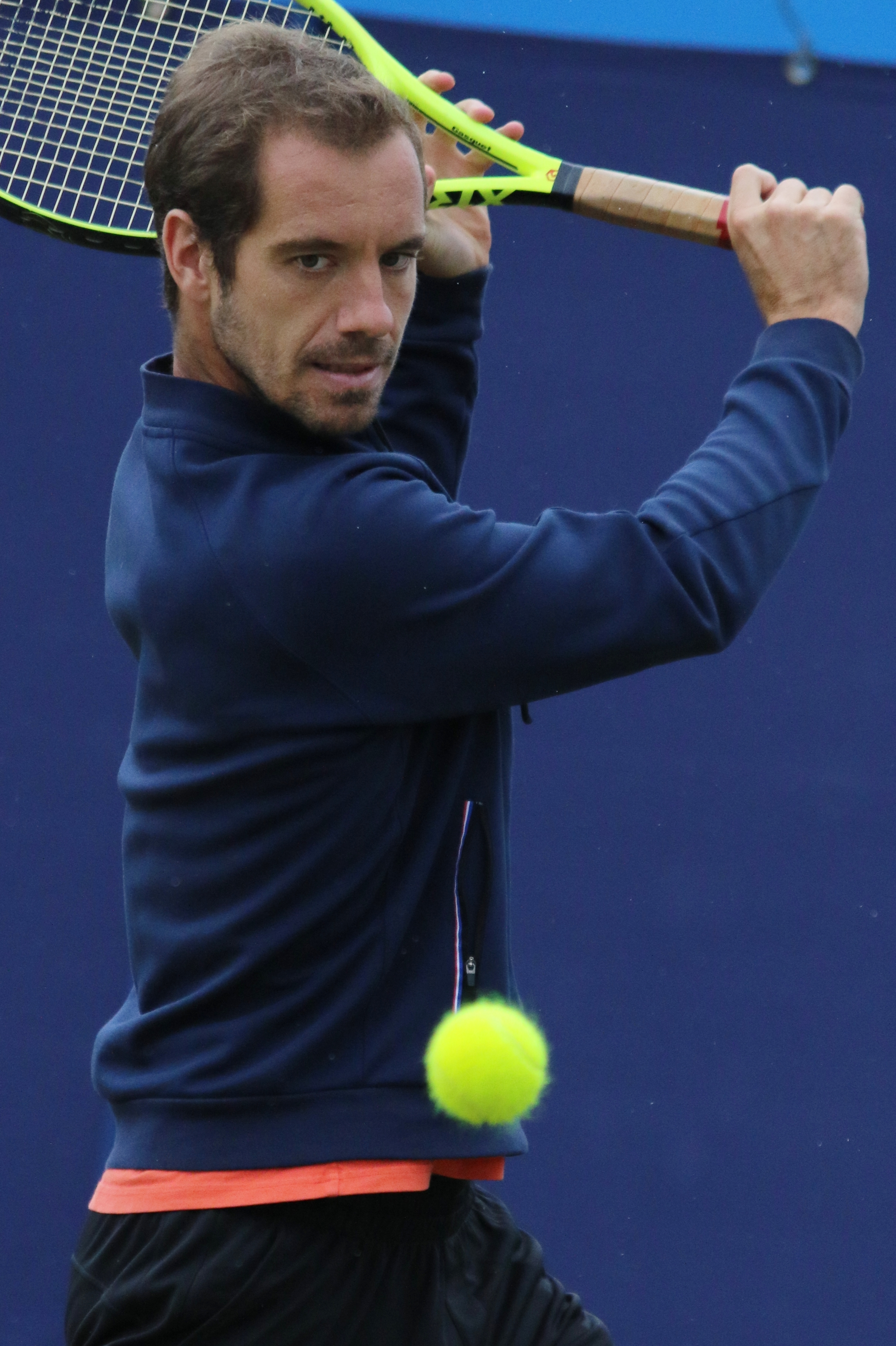
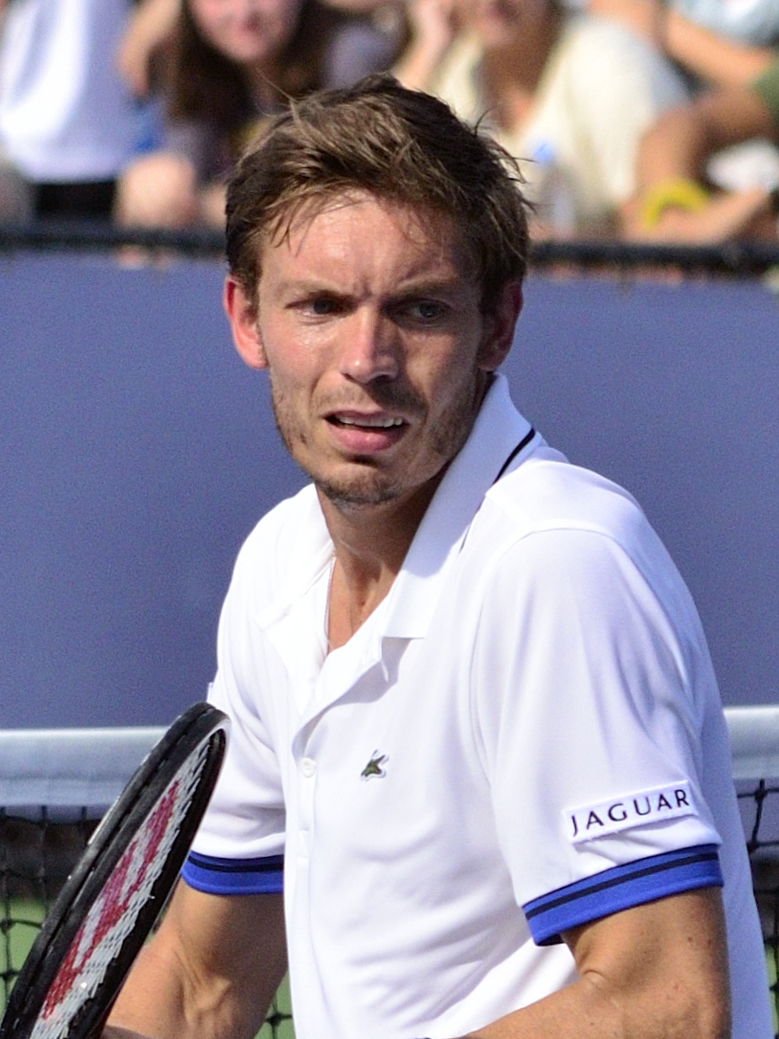
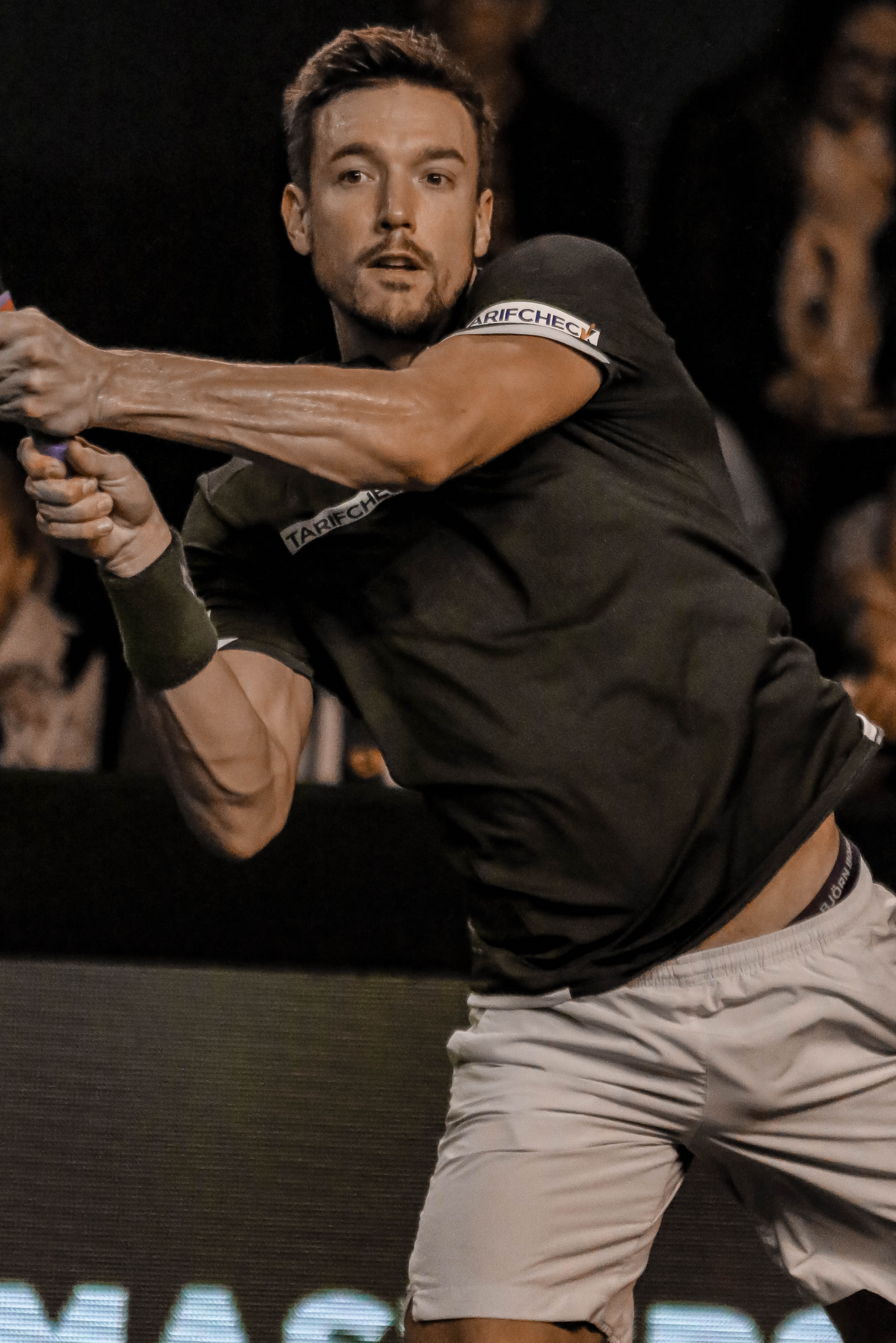
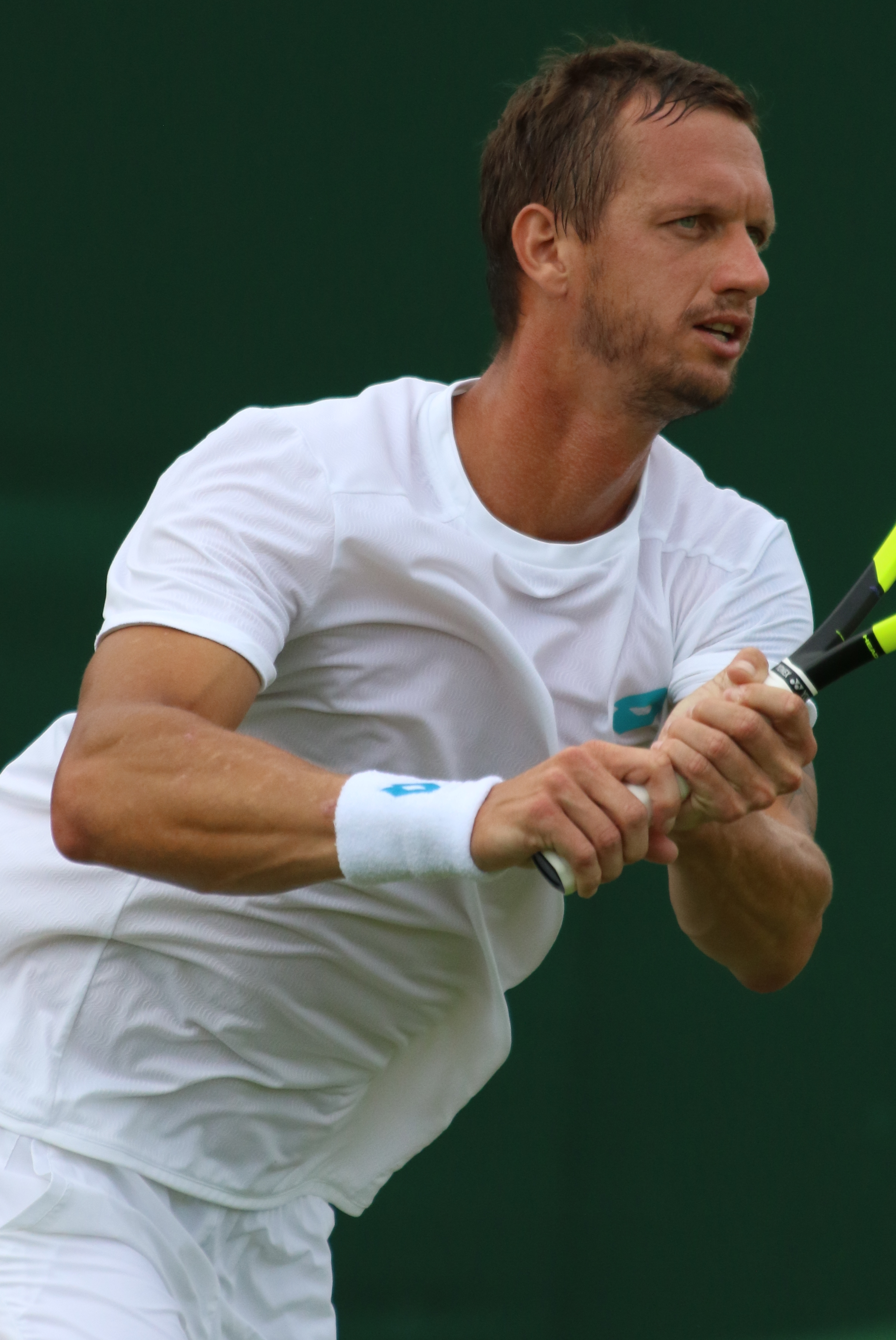
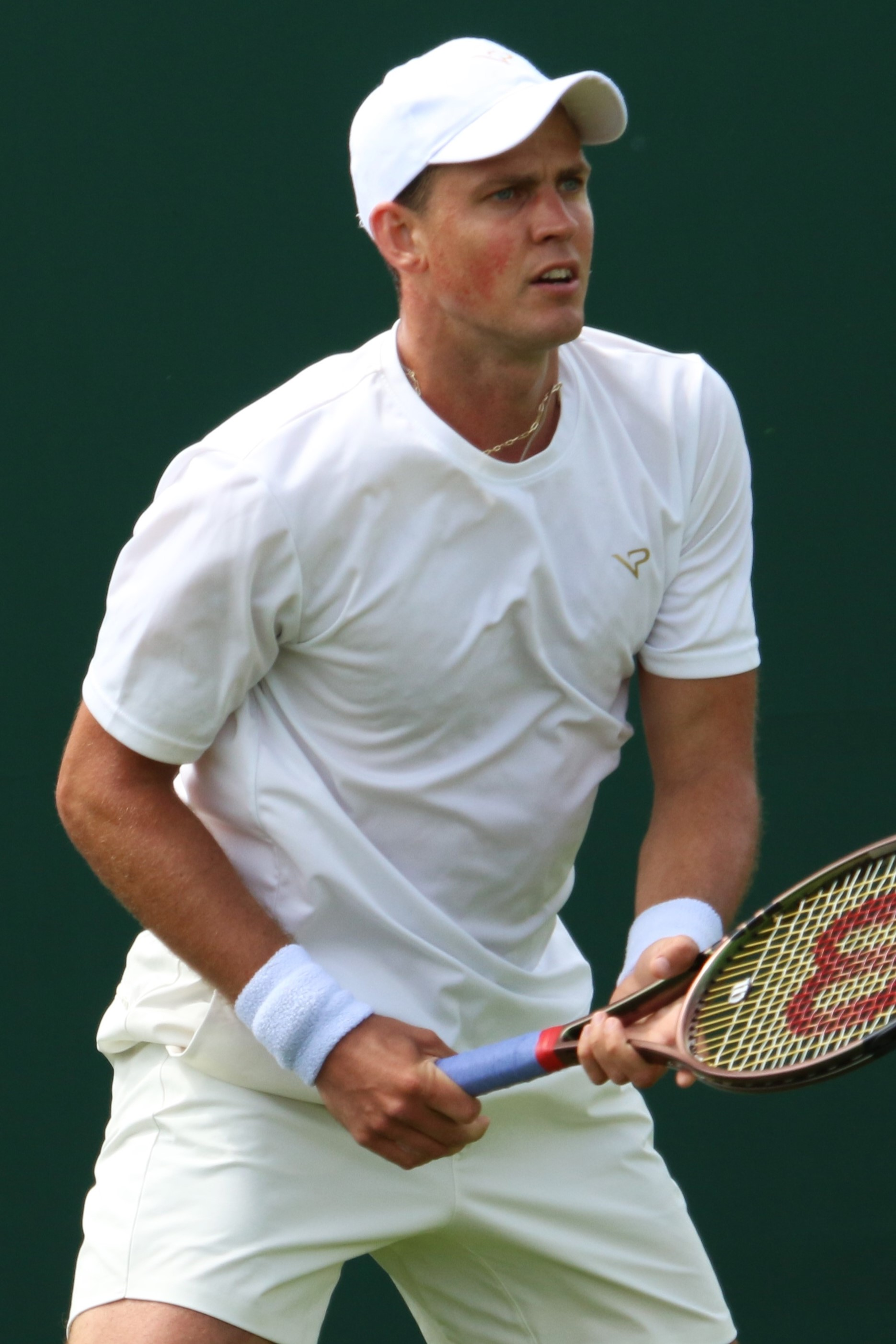
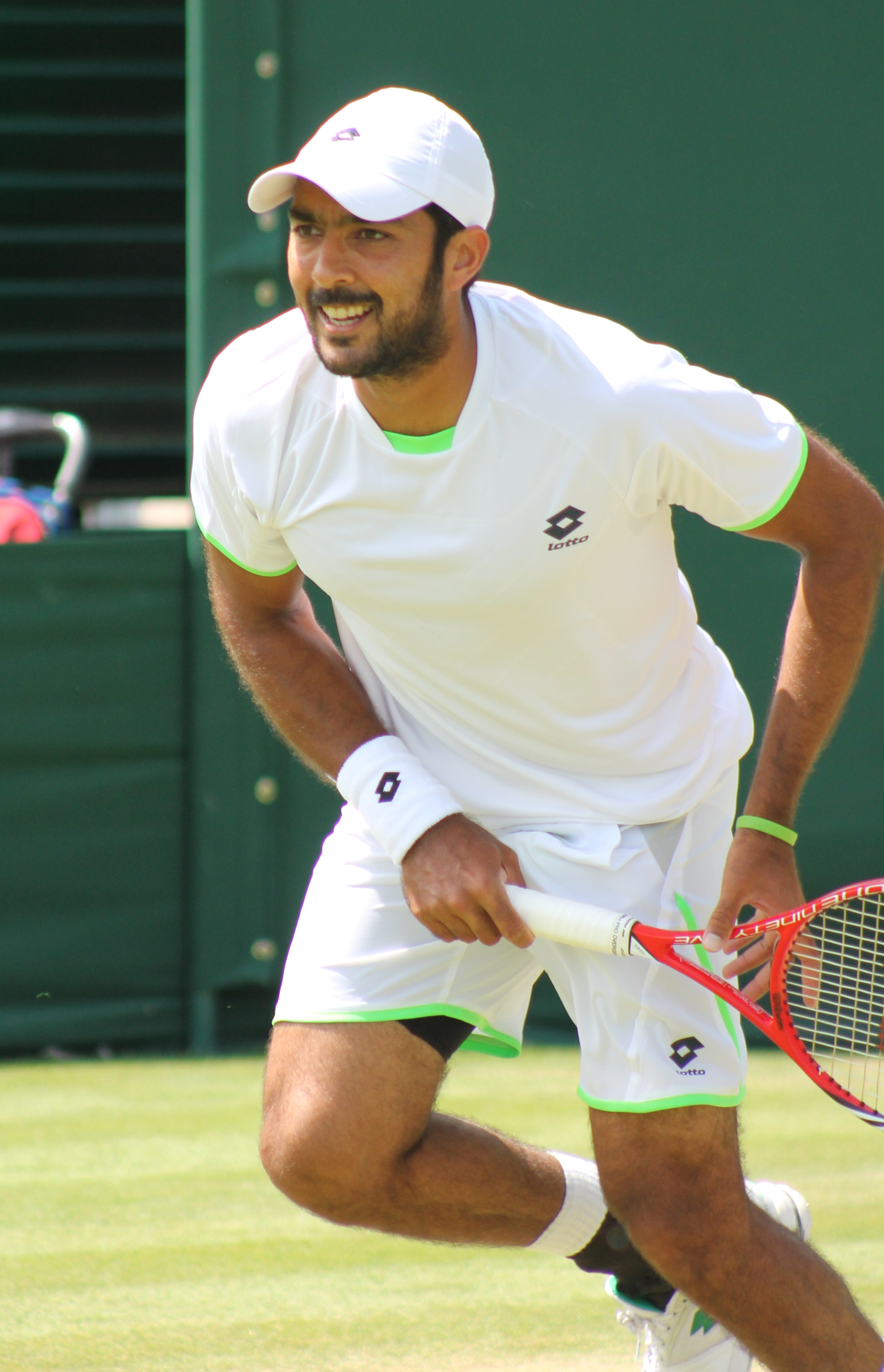
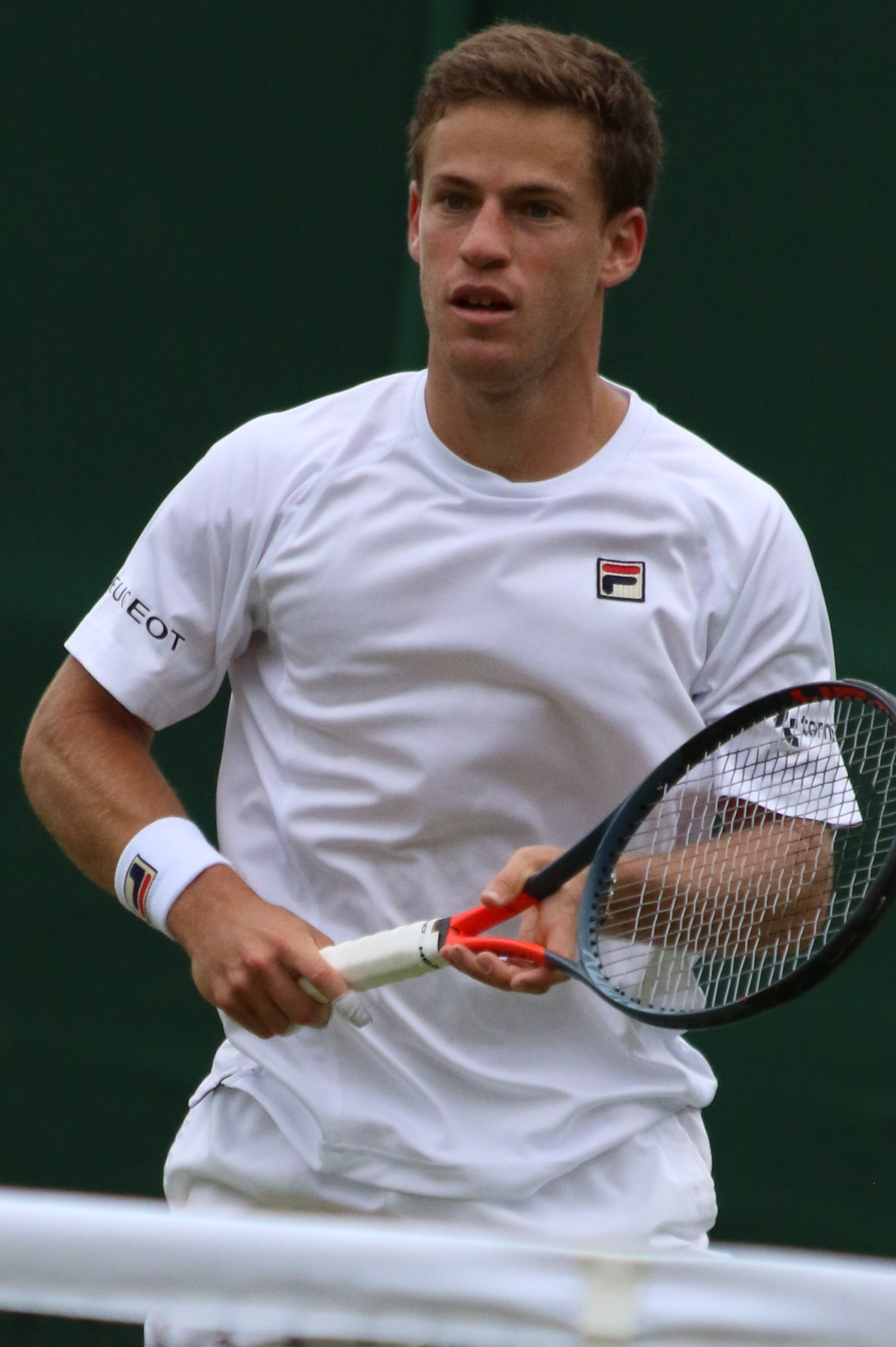
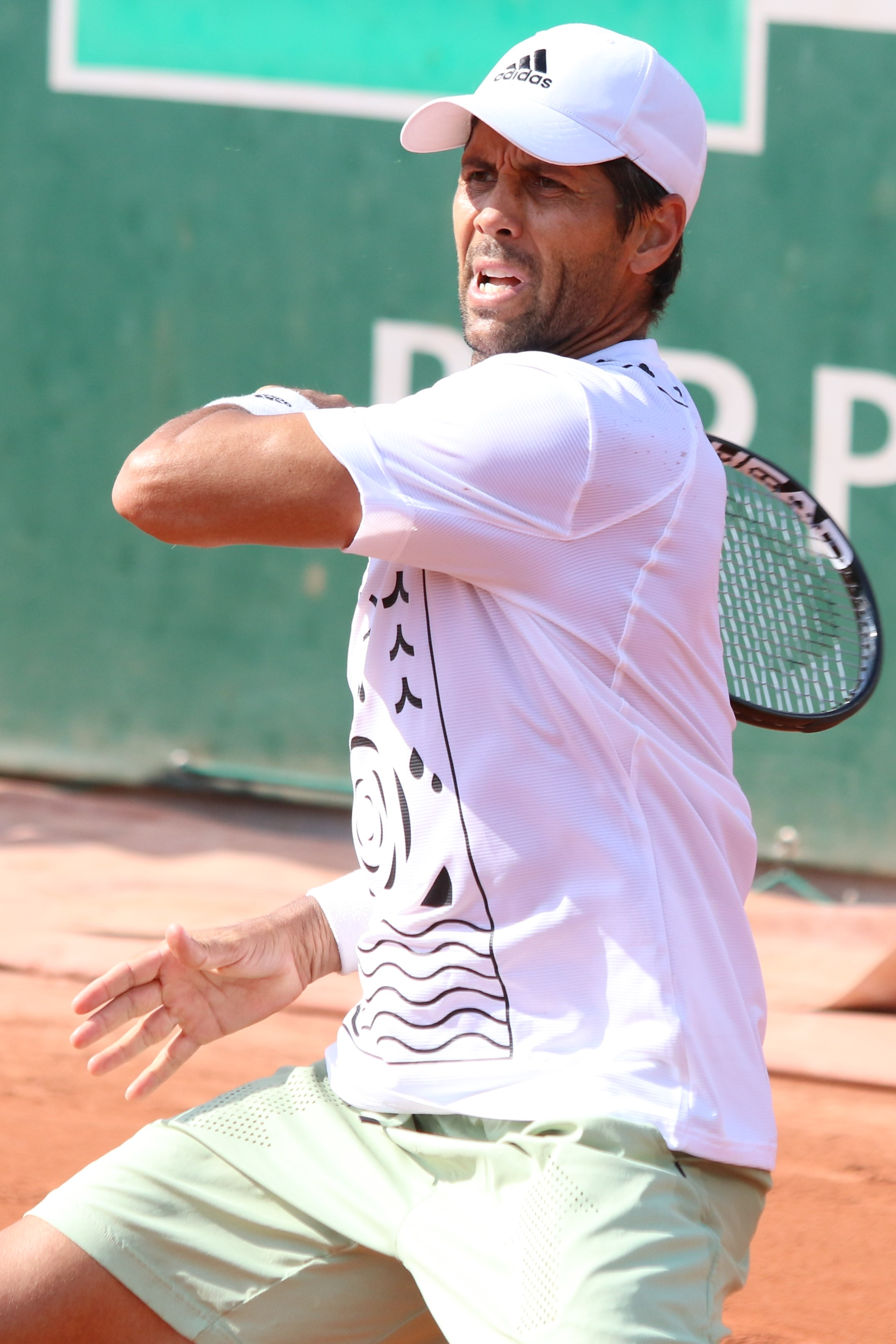
From left to right: Former top 10 players in both singles and doubles Rohan Bopanna, Ivan Dodig, Fabio Fognini, Richard Gasquet, Nicolas Mahut, Andreas Mies, Filip Polášek, Vasek Pospisil, Aisam-ul-Haq Qureshi, Diego Schwartzman, and Fernando Verdasco announced their respective retirements during the 2026 season.

The following is a list of notable players (winners of a main tour title, and/or part of the ATP rankings top 100 in singles, or top 100 in doubles, for at least one week) who announced their retirement from professional tennis, became inactive (after not playing for more than 52 weeks), or were permanently banned from playing, during the 2025 season:

- (France) Grégoire Barrère joined the professional tour in 2012 and reached a career-high ranking of No. 49 in singles in July 2023. In May 2025, during the French Open, he announced that he would retire from professional tennis at the end of the 2025 season.
- (Lithuania) Ričardas Berankis joined the professional tour in 2007 and reached a career-high ranking of world No. 50 in singles in May 2016, making him the highest-ranked Lithuanian player in history. He won one doubles title. Berankis announced his retirement from tennis on 9 December 2025 in an Instagram post, written in Lithuanian.
- (India) Rohan Bopanna joined the professional tour in 2003 and reached a career-high ranking of No. 1 in doubles in January 2024. He won 26 career doubles titles, including two major titles at the 2024 Australian Open in men's doubles and the 2017 French Open in mixed doubles. He was the oldest man to win a major title in any discipline at the former, as well as the oldest doubles world No. 1 in the ATP rankings. Bopanna announced his retirement from professional tennis in November 2025.
- (Italy) Marco Bortolotti joined the professional tour in 2008 and reached a career-high ranking of No. 85 in doubles in September 2024. Bortolotti announced his retirement from professional tennis in November 2025.
- (Argentina) Pedro Cachin joined the professional tour in 2013 and won one ATP Tour singles title, at the 2023 Swiss Open Gstaad. He reached a career-high ranking of No. 48 in singles in August 2023. Cachin announced his retirement from professional tennis in November 2025.
- (Italy) Salvatore Caruso joined the professional tour in 2011 and reached a career-high ranking of No. 76 in singles in November 2020. Caruso announced his retirement in May 2025.
- (Romania) Marius Copil joined the professional tour in 2008 and reached a career-high ranking of No. 56 in singles in January 2019. He won one doubles title. Copil announced his retirement from professional tennis in November 2025.
- (New Zealand) Marcus Daniell joined the professional tour in 2008 and reached a career-high ranking of No. 34 in doubles in January 2018. He won five doubles titles, including a bronze medal at the 2020 Summer Olympics with Michael Venus. Daniell retired from professional tennis in January 2025, making his final appearance at the 2025 ASB Classic.
- (Croatia) Ivan Dodig joined the professional tour in 2004 and reached career-high rankings of No. 29 in singles in October 2013 and No. 2 in doubles in September 2023. He won one singles title and 24 doubles titles, including a silver medal at the 2020 Summer Olympics with Marin Čilić. In September, following the US Open, Dodig announced his retirement by the end of the season.
- (United Kingdom) Kyle Edmund joined the professional tour in 2011 and won two ATP titles singles titles and one ATP doubles title. He reached a career-high ranking of No. 14 in singles on 8 October 2018. Edmund announced his retirement in August 2025.
- (Mexico) Ernesto Escobedo joined the professional tour in 2014 and reached a career-high ranking of No. 67 in singles in July 2017. He announced his retirement from professional tennis in March 2025.
- (United States) Christopher Eubanks joined the professional tour in 2017 and reached a career-high ranking of No. 29 in singles in July 2023. He won one career ATP Tour singles title, at the 2023 Mallorca Championships. He announced his retirement in November 2025.
- (France) Jonathan Eysseric joined the professional tour in 2008 and reached a career-high ranking of No. 72 in singles in July 2018. He announced his retirement from professional tennis in December 2025 after struggling to recover from an elbow injury.
- (Italy) Fabio Fognini joined the professional tour in 2004 and reached career-high rankings of No. 9 in singles in July 2019 and No. 7 in doubles in July 2015. He won nine career singles and eight career doubles titles. Fognini announced in May 2025, during the Italian Open that his 2025 appearance will be the last at his home Masters. He made his last professional appearance at the 2025 Wimbledon Championships and on 9 July 2025, Fognini officially announced his retirement from tennis.
- (France) Richard Gasquet joined the professional tour in 2002 and reached a career-high ranking of No. 7 in singles in July 2007. He won sixteen career singles titles and two doubles titles. On 10 October 2024, Gasquet announced his retirement from professional tennis, with his last tournament being the 2025 Hopman Cup.
- (Slovakia) Martin Kližan joined the professional tour in 2007 and reached a career-high ranking of No. 24 in singles in April 2015 and No. 73 in doubles in May 2015. He won six titles in singles and four titles in doubles. Kližan announced his definitive retirement from professional tennis in May 2025.
- (United States) Denis Kudla joined the professional tour in 2010 and reached a career-high ranking of No. 53 in singles in May 2016. Kudla announced his retirement from professional tennis in January 2025, during the United Cup.
- (France) Tristan Lamasine joined the professional tour in 2010 and reached a career-high ranking of No. 85 in doubles in June 2016. He retired from professional tennis during the summer of 2025.
- (Italy) Gianluca Mager joined the professional tour in 2013 and reached a career-high ranking of No. 62 in singles in November 2021. Mager announced his retirement from professional tennis in August 2025.
- (France) Nicolas Mahut joined the professional tour in 2000 and reached career-high rankings of No. 37 in singles in May 2014 and No. 1 in doubles in June 2016. He won four career singles titles and 37 doubles titles, along with achieving a career Grand Slam in doubles. In May 2025, during the French Open, Mahut announced that he would retire from professional tennis at the end of the 2025 season.
- (Netherlands) Matwé Middelkoop joined the professional tour in 2002 and reached a career-high ranking of No. 18 in doubles in February 2023. He won fourteen career doubles titles. Middelkoop announced his retirement from professional tennis in July 2025.
- (Germany) Andreas Mies joined the professional tour in 2013 and reached a career-high ranking of No. 8 in doubles in November 2019. He won seven doubles titles, including two major titles at the 2019 and 2020 French Open in men's doubles, both while partnering Kevin Krawietz. Mies retired in this season.
- (Austria) Dennis Novak joined the professional tour in 2011 and reached a career-high ranking of No. 85 in singles in March 2020. He announced his retirement from professional tennis in November 2025.
- (Slovakia) Filip Polášek joined the professional tour in 2005 and reached a career-high ranking of No. 7 in doubles in February 2020. He won seventeen doubles titles, including a major title at the 2021 Australian Open in men's doubles. Polášek announced his retirement in June 2025 at an exhibition match in Bratislava following three years of inactivity.
- (Canada) Vasek Pospisil joined the professional tour in 2007 and reached career-high rankings of No. 25 in singles in January 2014 and No. 4 in doubles in April 2015. He won seven doubles titles. Pospisil announced on 2 February 2025, following the 2025 Davis Cup tie, that it will be his last season, his last tournament being the 2025 National Bank Open on home soil in Toronto.
- (Pakistan) Aisam-ul-Haq Qureshi joined the professional tour in 1998 and reached a career-high ranking of No. 8 in doubles in June 2011. He won 18 career doubles titles. Reaching the final of the 2010 US Open with Rohan Bopanna, Qureshi was the first Pakistani player to reach a major final. He retired in November 2025 after 25 years on the professional tour.
- (Spain) Albert Ramos Viñolas joined the professional tour in 2007 and reached a career-high ranking of No. 17 in singles in May 2017. He won four career singles titles. Ramos Viñolas announced on 30 March 2025 that the 2025 season will be his last on the tour. His last tournament was the 2025 Copa Faulcombridge that was on home soil in Valencia.
- (Australia) Luke Saville joined the professional tour in 2012 and reached a career-high ranking of No. 23 in doubles in November 2021. Saville retired from professional tennis in January 2025, with his last appearance being at the Australian Open.
- Diego Schwartzman joined the professional tour in 2010 and reached a career-high ranking of No. 8 in singles in October 2020. He won four career singles titles. In May 2024, Schwartzman announced his retirement from professional tennis, his last tournament being the 2025 Argentina Open.
- (Netherlands) Tim van Rijthoven joined the professional tour in 2015 and reached a career-high ranking of No. 101 in singles in July 2022. He won one career singles title, at the 2022 Libéma Open. On 9 July 2025, Van Rijthoven announced his retirement from professional tennis after struggling with an elbow injury. His last professional appearance was at the 2025 French Open.
- (Spain) Fernando Verdasco joined the professional tour in 2001 and reached career-high rankings of No. 7 in singles in April 2009 and No. 8 in doubles in November 2013. He won seven singles and eight doubles titles. Verdasco announced his retirement on 14 February 2025, following the 2025 Qatar ExxonMobil Open in Doha where he partnered Novak Djokovic in doubles.

=== Inactivity ===
- (Argentina) Facundo Bagnis became inactive due to receiving a provisional suspension.
- (Germany) Andre Begemann became inactive having not played for more than a year, missing the entire 2025 season.
- (United States) John Paul Fruttero became inactive having not played for more than a year, missing the entire 2025 season.
- Teymuraz Gabashvili became inactive having not played for more than a year, missing the entire 2025 season.
- (Portugal) Fred Gil became inactive having not played for more than a year, missing the entire 2025 season.
- (Australia) Andrew Harris became inactive having not played for more than a year.
- (Turkey) Marsel İlhan became inactive having not played for more than a year.
- Andrey Kuznetsov became inactive having not played for more than a year, missing the entire 2025 season.
- (Argentina) Juan Ignacio Londero became inactive having not played for more than a year, missing the entire 2025 season.
- (Ukraine) Vladyslav Manafov became inactive having not played for more than a year, missing the entire 2024, 2025 seasons in singles and 2025 in doubles.
- (France) Fabrice Martin became inactive having not played for more than a year, missing the entire 2025 season.
- (Venezuela) Gonzalo Oliveira became inactive due to receiving a four-year ban.
- (Australia) Max Purcell became inactive due to receiving a provisional suspension.
- (Canada) Milos Raonic became inactive having not played for more than a year, missing the entire 2025 season.
- (United States) Tennys Sandgren became inactive having not played for more than a year, missing the entire 2025 season.
- (Austria) Sam Weissborn became inactive having not played for more than a year, missing the entire 2025 season.

== Comebacks and appearances ==
- (United States) Jenson Brooksby returned to the tour at the 2025 Australian Open after over a year of inactivity due to injury and whereabouts failure suspension.
- (Ecuador) Emilio Gómez returned to the tour at the 2025 Challenger Ciudad de Guayaquil after a year of inactivity.
- (Australia) Lleyton Hewitt returned to the doubles circuit at the 2025 NSW Open and the Playford International, partnering his son Cruz Hewitt.
- Ilya Ivashka returned to the ITF Men's World Tennis Tour after a year of inactivity.
- (Uzbekistan) Denis Istomin returned to the ITF Men's World Tennis Tour in March at a Challenger event.
- (Australia) Nick Kyrgios returned to the tour at the 2025 Brisbane International after being absent since 2022.
- (United States) Jack Sock returned briefly for one tournament at the 2025 Hall of Fame Open.
- Stefan Seifert returned to the ITF Men's World Tennis Tour in January at a M25 event in Germany following five years of inactivity.
- (Germany) Cedrik-Marcel Stebe returned to the ITF Men's World Tennis Tour after two years of inactivity.
- (Sweden) Mikael Ymer returned to the ITF Men's World Tennis Tour following the expiration of his doping suspension in 2024.

== See also ==
- 2025 WTA Tour
- 2025 ATP Challenger Tour
- 2025 ITF Men's World Tennis Tour
