= Carlos Alcaraz career statistics =

Career finals
Discipline	Type	Won	Lost	Total
Singles
Singles	Grand Slam	7	1	8
Singles	ATP Finals	1	1	2
Singles	ATP 1000	9	2	11
Singles	ATP 500	11	3	14
Singles	ATP 250	2	1	3
Singles	Olympics	0	1	1
Singles	Total	30	9	39
Doubles
Doubles	Grand Slam	–	–	–
Doubles	ATP Finals	–	–	–
Doubles	ATP 1000	–	–	–
Doubles	ATP 500	–	–	–
Doubles	ATP 250	–	–	–
Doubles	Olympics	–	–	–
Doubles	Total	–	–	–

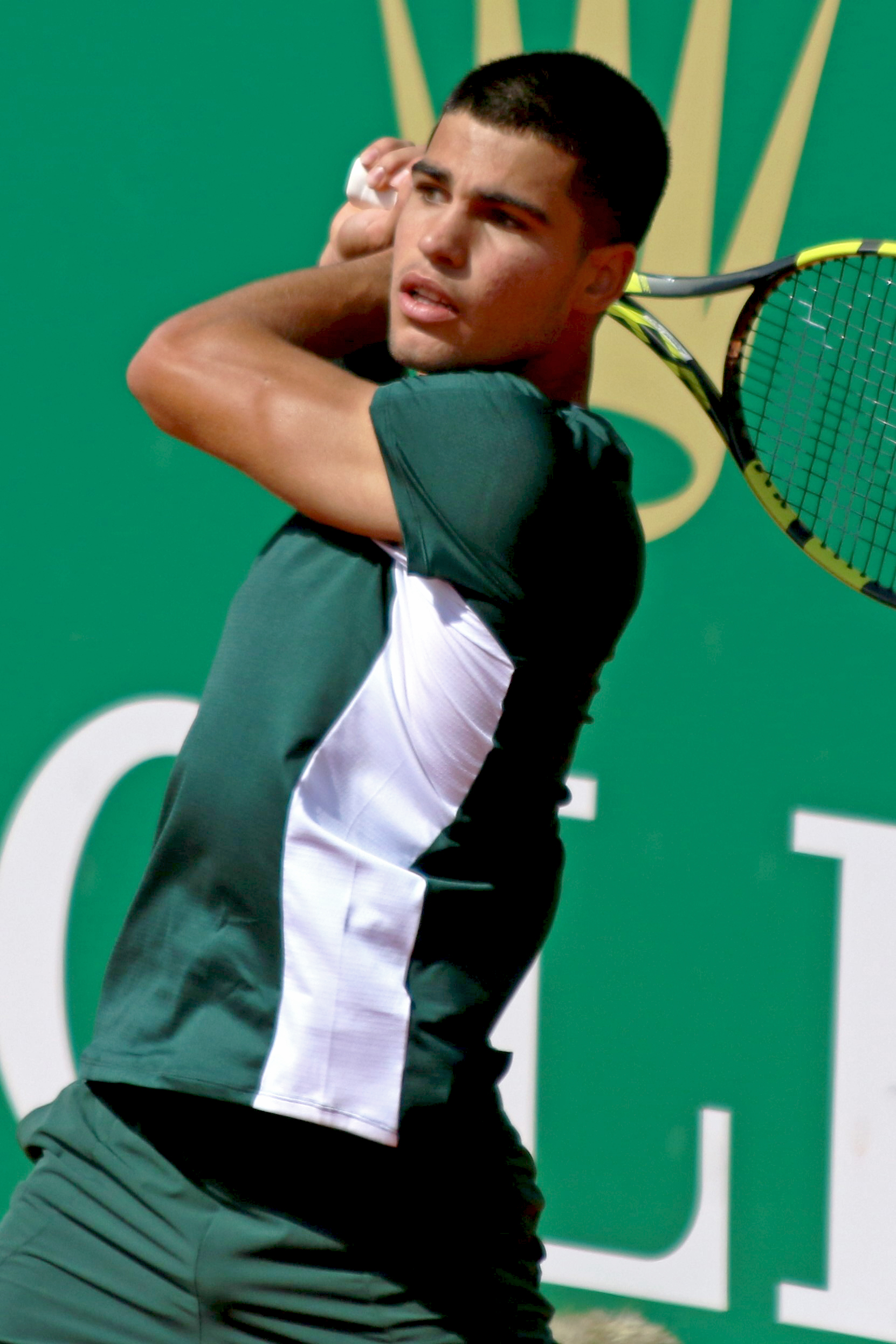
Alcaraz at the 2022 Monte-Carlo Masters

This is a list of main career statistics of Spanish professional tennis player Carlos Alcaraz. All statistics are according to the ATP Tour and ITF websites.

== Performance timelines ==
Key
W	F	SF	QF	#R	RR	Q#	P#	DNQ	A	Z#	PO	G	S	B	NMS	NTI	P	NH

(W) winner; (F) finalist; (SF) semifinalist; (QF) quarterfinalist; (#R) rounds 4, 3, 2, 1; (RR) round-robin stage; (Q#) qualification round; (P#) preliminary round; (DNQ) did not qualify; (A) absent; (Z#) Davis/Fed Cup Zonal Group (with number indication) or (PO) play-off; (G) gold, (S) silver or (B) bronze Olympic/Paralympic medal; (NMS) not a Masters tournament; (NTI) not a Tier I tournament; (P) postponed; (NH) not held; (SR) strike rate (events won / competed); (W–L) win–loss record.
To avoid confusion and double counting, these charts are updated at the conclusion of a tournament or when the player's participation has ended.

Only main-draw results in ATP Tour, Grand Slam tournaments, Davis Cup/ATP Cup/Laver Cup and Olympic Games are included in win–loss records.

=== Singles ===
Current through the 2026 ATP Finals.

Tournament	2020	2021	2022	2023	2024	2025	2026	SR	W–L	Win%
Grand Slam tournaments
Australian Open	A	2R	3R	A	QF	QF	W	1 / 5	18–4	82%
French Open	Q2	3R	QF	SF	W	W	A	2 / 5	25–3	89%
Wimbledon	NH	2R	4R	W	W	F	A	2 / 5	24–3	89%
US Open	A	QF	W	SF	2R	W	QF	2 / 6	28–4	88%
Win–loss	0–0	8–4	16–3	17–2	19–2	24–2	11–1	7 / 21	95–14	87%
Year-end championships
ATP Finals	DNQ		A (Note: Qualified but did not compete due to injury)	SF	RR	F	W	1 / 4	12–5	71%
National representation
Summer Olympics (Note: 2020 Summer Olympics is postponed to 2021 due to COVID-19 pandemic.)	NH	A	Not Held		S	NH		0 / 1	5–1	83%
Davis Cup	NH	A	QF	A	QF	A		0 / 2	5–1	83%
ATP 1000 tournaments
Indian Wells Open	NH	2R	SF	W	W	SF	SF	2 / 6	24–4	86%
Miami Open	NH	1R	W	SF	QF	2R	3R	1 / 6	14–5	74%
Monte-Carlo Masters	NH	A	2R	A	A	W	F	1 / 3	9–2	82%
Madrid Open	NH	2R	W	W	QF	A	A	2 / 4	15–2	88%
Italian Open	A	A	A	3R	A	W	A	1 / 2	7–1	88%
Canadian Open	NH	A	2R	QF	A	A	A	0 / 2	2–2	50%
Cincinnati Open	A	1R	QF	F	2R	W	A	1 / 5	12–4	75%
Shanghai Masters	NH			4R	QF	A	3R	0 / 3	6–3	67%
Paris Masters	A	3R	QF	2R	3R	2R	W	1 / 6	9–5	64%
Win–loss	0–0	3–5	19–5	25–6	16–5	21–3	14–4	9 / 37	98–28	78%
Career statistics
	2020	2021	2022	2023	2024	2025	2026	Career		
Tournaments	1	19	17	17	16	16	12	Career total: 98		
Titles	0	1	5	6	4	8	6	Career total: 30		
Finals	0	1	7	8	5	11	7	Career total: 39		
Hard win–loss	0–0	20–10	27–8	28–9	29–8	38–7	42–4	15 / 58	184–46	80%
Clay win–loss	1–1	11–6	27–4	25–3	17–4	22–1	5–1	11 / 32	108–20	84%
Grass win–loss	0–0	1–1	3–1	12–0	8–1	11–1	0–0	4 / 8	35–4	90%
Overall win–loss	1–1	32–17	57–13	65–12	54–13	71–9	47–5	30 / 98	327–70	82%
Win %	50%	65%	81%	84%	81%	89%	90%	Career total: 82%		
Year-end ranking (Note: 2019 ATP ranking: 492)	141	32	1	2	3	1	3	$69,137,608		

=== Doubles ===
Tournament	2021	2022	2023	2024	2025	2026	SR	W–L	Win%
Grand Slam tournaments
Australian Open	A	A	A	A	A	A	0 / 0	0–0	0%
French Open	A	A	A	A	A	A	0 / 0	0–0	0%
Wimbledon	A	A	A	A	A	A	0 / 0	0–0	0%
US Open	A	A	A	A	A	A	0 / 0	0–0	0%
National representation
Summer Olympics	A	NH		QF	NH		0 / 1	2–1	50%
ATP 1000 tournaments
Indian Wells Open	1R	1R	A	A	A	A	0 / 2	0–2	0%
Madrid Open	A	2R	A	A	A	A	0 / 1	1–1	50%
Career statistics
	2021	2022	2023	2024	2025	2026	Career		
Tournaments	2	3	0	1	0	0	6		
Overall win–loss	1–1	2–2	0–0	4–3	2–0	1–0	10–6		63%
Year-end ranking	–	560	–	–	–	–	63%		

== Grand Slam tournaments finals ==
=== Singles: 8 (7 titles, 1 runner-up) ===
Result	Year	Tournament	Surface	Opponent	Score
Win	2022	US Open	Hard	(Norway) Casper Ruud	6–4, 2–6, 7–6^{(7–1)}, 6–3
Win	2023	Wimbledon	Grass	(Serbia) Novak Djokovic	1–6, 7–6^{(8–6)}, 6–1, 3–6, 6–4
Win	2024	French Open	Clay	(Germany) Alexander Zverev	6–3, 2–6, 5–7, 6–1, 6–2
Win	2024	Wimbledon (2)	Grass	(Serbia) Novak Djokovic (2)	6–2, 6–2, 7–6^{(7–4)}
Win	2025	French Open (2)	Clay	(Italy) Jannik Sinner	4–6, 6–7^{(4–7)}, 6–4, 7–6^{(7–3)}, 7–6^{(10–2)}
Loss	2025	Wimbledon	Grass	(Italy) Jannik Sinner	6–4, 4–6, 4–6, 4–6
Win	2025	US Open (2)	Hard	(Italy) Jannik Sinner (2)	6–2, 3–6, 6–1, 6–4
Win	2026	Australian Open	Hard	(Serbia) Novak Djokovic (3)	2–6, 6–2, 6–3, 7–5

== Other significant finals ==
=== Year-end championships (ATP Finals) ===
==== Singles: 2 (1 title, 1 runner-up) ====
Result	Year	Tournament	Surface	Opponent	Score
Loss	2025	ATP Finals, Italy	Hard (i)	(Italy) Jannik Sinner	6–7^{(4–7)}, 5–7
Win	2026	ATP Finals, Italy	Hard (i)	(Germany) Alexander Zverev	6–2, 7–6^{(9–7)}

=== ATP 1000 tournaments ===
==== Singles: 11 (9 titles, 2 runner-ups) ====
Result	Year	Tournament	Surface	Opponent	Score
Win	2022	Miami Open	Hard	(Norway) Casper Ruud	7–5, 6–4
Win	2022	Madrid Open	Clay	(Germany) Alexander Zverev	6–3, 6–1
Win	2023	Indian Wells Open	Hard	Daniil Medvedev	6–3, 6–2
Win	2023	Madrid Open (2)	Clay	(Germany) Jan-Lennard Struff	6–4, 3–6, 6–3
Loss	2023	Cincinnati Open	Hard	(Serbia) Novak Djokovic	7–5, 6–7^{(7–9)}, 6–7^{(4–7)}
Win	2024	Indian Wells Open (2)	Hard	Daniil Medvedev (2)	7–6^{(7–5)}, 6–1
Win	2025	Monte-Carlo Masters	Clay	(Italy) Lorenzo Musetti	3–6, 6–1, 6–0
Win	2025	Italian Open	Clay	(Italy) Jannik Sinner	7–6^{(7–5)}, 6–1
Win	2025	Cincinnati Open	Hard	(Italy) Jannik Sinner (2)	5–0 ret.
Loss	2026	Monte-Carlo Masters	Clay	(Italy) Jannik Sinner	6–7^{(5–7)}, 3–6
Win	2026	Paris Masters	Hard (i)	(United States) Ben Shelton	7–6^{(7–5)}, 7–5

=== Summer Olympics ===
==== Singles: 1 (silver medal) ====
Result	Year	Tournament	Surface	Opponent	Score
Loss	2024	Paris Olympics	Clay	(Serbia) Novak Djokovic	6–7^{(3–7)}, 6–7^{(2–7)}

== ATP Tour finals ==
=== Singles: 39 (30 titles, 9 runner-ups) ===
Legend Grand Slam (7–1) Olympics (0–1) ATP Finals (1–1) ATP 1000 (9–2) ATP 500 (11–3) ATP 250 (2–1)	Finals by surface Hard (15–2) Clay (11–6) Grass (4–1)	Finals by setting Outdoor (26–8) Indoor (4–1)

Result	W–L	Date	Tournament	Tier	Surface	Opponent	Score
Win	1–0	Jul 2021	Croatia Open, Croatia	ATP 250	Clay	(France) Richard Gasquet	6–2, 6–2
Win	2–0	Feb 2022	Rio Open, Brazil	ATP 500	Clay	(Argentina) Diego Schwartzman	6–4, 6–2
Win	3–0	Mar 2022	Miami Open, US	ATP 1000	Hard	(Norway) Casper Ruud	7–5, 6–4
Win	4–0	Apr 2022	Barcelona Open, Spain	ATP 500	Clay	(Spain) Pablo Carreño Busta	6–3, 6–2
Win	5–0	May 2022	Madrid Open, Spain	ATP 1000	Clay	(Germany) Alexander Zverev	6–3, 6–1
Loss	5–1	Jul 2022	Hamburg European Open, Germany	ATP 500	Clay	(Italy) Lorenzo Musetti	4–6, 7–6^{(8–6)}, 4–6
Loss	5–2	Jul 2022	Croatia Open, Croatia	ATP 250	Clay	(Italy) Jannik Sinner	7–6^{(7–5)}, 1–6, 1–6
Win	6–2	Sep 2022	US Open, New York, US	Grand Slam	Hard	(Norway) Casper Ruud	6–4, 2–6, 7–6^{(7–1)}, 6–3
Win	7–2	Feb 2023	Argentina Open, Argentina	ATP 250	Clay	(United Kingdom) Cameron Norrie	6–3, 7–5
Loss	7–3	Feb 2023	Rio Open, Brazil	ATP 500	Clay	(United Kingdom) Cameron Norrie	7–5, 4–6, 5–7
Win	8–3	Mar 2023	Indian Wells Open, US	ATP 1000	Hard	Daniil Medvedev	6–3, 6–2
Win	9–3	Apr 2023	Barcelona Open, Spain (2)	ATP 500	Clay	(Greece) Stefanos Tsitsipas	6–3, 6–4
Win	10–3	May 2023	Madrid Open, Spain (2)	ATP 1000	Clay	(Germany) Jan-Lennard Struff	6–4, 3–6, 6–3
Win	11–3	Jun 2023	Queen's Club Championships, UK	ATP 500	Grass	(Australia) Alex de Minaur	6–4, 6–4
Win	12–3	Jul 2023	Wimbledon, UK	Grand Slam	Grass	(Serbia) Novak Djokovic	1–6, 7–6^{(8–6)}, 6–1, 3–6, 6–4
Loss	12–4	Aug 2023	Cincinnati Open, US	ATP 1000	Hard	(Serbia) Novak Djokovic	7–5, 6–7^{(7–9)}, 6–7^{(4–7)}
Win	13–4	Mar 2024	Indian Wells Open, US (2)	ATP 1000	Hard	Daniil Medvedev	7–6^{(7–5)}, 6–1
Win	14–4	Jun 2024	French Open, France	Grand Slam	Clay	(Germany) Alexander Zverev	6–3, 2–6, 5–7, 6–1, 6–2
Win	15–4	Jul 2024	Wimbledon, UK (2)	Grand Slam	Grass	(Serbia) Novak Djokovic	6–2, 6–2, 7–6^{(7–4)}
Loss	15–5	Aug 2024	Summer Olympics, France	Olympics	Clay	(Serbia) Novak Djokovic	6–7^{(3–7)}, 6–7^{(2–7)}
Win	16–5	Oct 2024	China Open, China	ATP 500	Hard	(Italy) Jannik Sinner	6–7^{(6–8)}, 6–4, 7–6^{(7–3)}
Win	17–5	Feb 2025	Rotterdam Open, Netherlands	ATP 500	Hard (i)	(Australia) Alex de Minaur	6–4, 3–6, 6–2
Win	18–5	Apr 2025	Monte-Carlo Masters, France	ATP 1000	Clay	(Italy) Lorenzo Musetti	3–6, 6–1, 6–0
Loss	18–6	Apr 2025	Barcelona Open, Spain	ATP 500	Clay	(Denmark) Holger Rune	6–7^{(6–8)}, 2–6
Win	19–6	May 2025	Italian Open, Italy	ATP 1000	Clay	(Italy) Jannik Sinner	7–6^{(7–5)}, 6–1
Win	20–6	Jun 2025	French Open, France (2)	Grand Slam	Clay	(Italy) Jannik Sinner	4–6, 6–7^{(4–7)}, 6–4, 7–6^{(7–3)}, 7–6^{(10–2)}
Win	21–6	Jun 2025	Queen's Club Championships, UK (2)	ATP 500	Grass	(Czech Republic) Jiří Lehečka	7–5, 6–7^{(5–7)}, 6–2
Loss	21–7	Jul 2025	Wimbledon, UK	Grand Slam	Grass	(Italy) Jannik Sinner	6–4, 4–6, 4–6, 4–6
Win	22–7	Aug 2025	Cincinnati Open, US	ATP 1000	Hard	(Italy) Jannik Sinner	5–0 ret.
Win	23–7	Sep 2025	US Open, New York, US (2)	Grand Slam	Hard	(Italy) Jannik Sinner	6–2, 3–6, 6–1, 6–4
Win	24–7	Sep 2025	Japan Open, Japan	ATP 500	Hard	(United States) Taylor Fritz	6–4, 6–4
Loss	24–8	Nov 2025	ATP Finals, Italy	Tour Finals	Hard (i)	(Italy) Jannik Sinner	6–7^{(4–7)}, 5–7
Win	25–8	Jan 2026	Australian Open, Australia	Grand Slam	Hard	(Serbia) Novak Djokovic	2–6, 6–2, 6–3, 7–5
Win	26–8	Feb 2026	Qatar Open, Qatar	ATP 500	Hard	(France) Arthur Fils	6–2, 6–1
Loss	26–9	Apr 2026	Monte-Carlo Masters, France	ATP 1000	Clay	(Italy) Jannik Sinner	6–7^{(5–7)}, 3–6
Win	27–9	Sep 2026	Japan Open, Japan (2)	ATP 500	Hard	(Czech Republic) Jiří Lehečka	7–6^{(7–4)}, 6–4
Win	28–9	Oct 2026	Vienna Open, Austria	ATP 500	Hard (i)	(Australia) Alex de Minaur	6–1, 6–4
Win	29–9	Nov 2026	Paris Masters, France	ATP 1000	Hard (i)	(United States) Ben Shelton	7–6^{(7–5)}, 7–5
Win	30–9	Nov 2026	ATP Finals, Italy	Tour Finals	Hard (i)	(Germany) Alexander Zverev	6–2, 7–6^{(9–7)}

== Next Gen ATP Finals ==
=== Singles: 1 (title) ===
Result	Date	Tournament	Surface	Opponent	Score
Win	Nov 2021	Next Gen ATP Finals, Italy	Hard (i)	(United States) Sebastian Korda	4–3^{(7–5)}, 4–2, 4–2

== ATP Challenger Tour finals ==
=== Singles: 5 (4 titles, 1 runner-up) ===
Finals by surface
Hard (–)
Clay (4–1)

Result	W–L	Date	Tournament	Surface	Opponent	Score
Win	1–0	Aug 2020	Trieste International, Italy	Clay	(Italy) Riccardo Bonadio	6–4, 6–3
Loss	1–1	Sep 2020	Venezia International, Italy	Clay	(Spain) Bernabé Zapata Miralles	2–6, 6–4, 2–6
Win	2–1	Oct 2020	Sánchez-Casal Cup, Spain	Clay	(Bosnia and Herzegovina) Damir Džumhur	4–6, 6–2, 6–1
Win	3–1	Oct 2020	Ferrero Challenger Open, Spain	Clay	(Spain) Pedro Martínez	7–6^{(8–6)}, 6–3
Win	4–1	May 2021	Open de Oeiras III, Portugal	Clay	(Argentina) Facundo Bagnis	6–4, 6–4

== ITF Tour finals ==
=== Singles: 4 (3 titles, 1 runner-up) ===
Finals by surface
Hard (2–0)
Clay (1–1)

Result	W–L	Date	Tournament	Surface	Opponent	Score
Win	1–0	Jul 2019	M25 Dénia, Spain	Clay	(Kazakhstan) Timofey Skatov	6–4, 6–3
Win	2–0	Jan 2020	M15 Manacor, Spain	Hard	(France) Evan Furness	6–0, 6–2
Win	3–0	Jan 2020	M15 Manacor, Spain	Hard	(France) Evan Furness	6–3, 6–4
Loss	3–1	Feb 2020	M15 Antalya, Turkey	Clay	(Hungary) Zsombor Piros	6–4, 4–6, 3–6

== Career Grand Slam statistics ==
=== Best Grand Slam tournament results details ===
Grand Slam tournament winners are in boldface, and runners-up are in italics (at time of matches played).

Australian Open
2026 Australian Open (1st seed)
Rd	Opponent	Rnk	Score
1R	(Australia) Adam Walton	81	6–3, 7–6^{(7–2)}, 6–2
2R	(Germany) Yannick Hanfmann	102	7–6^{(7–4)}, 6–3, 6–2
3R	(France) Corentin Moutet (32)	37	6–2, 6–4, 6–1
4R	(United States) Tommy Paul (19)	20	7–6^{(8–6)}, 6–4, 7–5
QF	(Australia) Alex De Minaur (6)	**6**	7–5, 6–2, 6–1
SF	(Germany) Alexander Zverev (3)	**3**	6–4, 7–6^{(7–5)}, 6–7^{(3–7)}, 6–7^{(4–7)}, 7–5
**W**	(Serbia) Novak Djokovic (4)	**4**	2–6, 6–2, 6–3, 7–5

French Open
2024 French Open (3rd seed)
Rd	Opponent	Rnk	Score
1R	(United States) J. J. Wolf (LL)	107	6–1, 6–2, 6–1
2R	(Netherlands) Jesper de Jong (Q)	176	6–3, 6–4, 2–6, 6–2
3R	(United States) Sebastian Korda (27)	28	6–4, 7–6^{(7–5)}, 6–3
4R	(Canada) Félix Auger-Aliassime (21)	21	6–3, 6–3, 6–1
QF	(Greece) Stefanos Tsitsipas (9)	**9**	6–3, 7–6^{(7–3)}, 6–4
SF	(Italy) Jannik Sinner (2)	**2**	2–6, 6–3, 3–6, 6–4, 6–3
**W**	(Germany) Alexander Zverev (4)	**4**	6–3, 2–6, 5–7, 6–1, 6–2
2025 French Open (2nd seed)
Rd	Opponent	Rnk	Score
1R	(Italy) Giulio Zeppieri (Q)	310	6–3, 6–4, 6–2
2R	(Hungary) Fábián Marozsán	56	6–1, 4–6, 6–1, 6–2
3R	(Bosnia and Herzegovina) Damir Džumhur	69	6–1, 6–3, 4–6, 6–4
4R	(United States) Ben Shelton (13)	13	7–6^{(10–8)}, 6–3, 4–6, 6–4
QF	(United States) Tommy Paul (12)	12	6–0, 6–1, 6–4
SF	(Italy) Lorenzo Musetti (8)	**7**	4–6, 7–6^{(7–3)}, 6–0, 2–0 ret.
**W**	(Italy) Jannik Sinner (1)	**1**	4–6, 6–7^{(4–7)}, 6–4, 7–6^{(7–3)}, 7–6^{(10–2)}

Wimbledon
2023 Wimbledon (1st seed)
Rd	Opponent	Rnk	Score
1R	(France) Jérémy Chardy (PR)	534	6–0, 6–2, 7–5
2R	(France) Alexandre Müller	84	6–4, 7–6^{(7–2)}, 6–3
3R	(Chile) Nicolás Jarry (25)	28	6–3, 6–7^{(6–8)}, 6–3, 7–5
4R	(Italy) Matteo Berrettini	38	3–6, 6–3, 6–3, 6–3
QF	(Denmark) Holger Rune (6)	**6**	7–6^{(7–3)}, 6–4, 6–4
SF	Daniil Medvedev (3)	**3**	6–3, 6–3, 6–3
**W**	(Serbia) Novak Djokovic (2)	**2**	1–6, 7–6^{(8–6)}, 6–1, 3–6, 6–4
2024 Wimbledon (3rd seed)
Rd	Opponent	Rnk	Score
1R	(Estonia) Mark Lajal (Q)	269	7–6^{(7–3)}, 7–5, 6–2
2R	(Australia) Aleksandar Vukic	69	7–6^{(7–5)}, 6–2, 6–2
3R	(United States) Frances Tiafoe (29)	29	5–7, 6–2, 4–6, 7–6^{(7–2)}, 6–2
4R	(France) Ugo Humbert (16)	16	6–3, 6–4, 1–6, 7–5
QF	(United States) Tommy Paul (12)	13	5–7, 6–4, 6–2, 6–2
SF	Daniil Medvedev (5)	**5**	6–7^{(1–7)}, 6–3, 6–4, 6–4
**W**	(Serbia) Novak Djokovic (2)	**2**	6–2, 6–2, 7–6^{(7–4)}

US Open
2022 US Open (3rd seed)
Rd	Opponent	Rnk	Score
1R	(Argentina) Sebastián Báez	37	7–5, 7–5, 2–0 ret.
2R	(Argentina) Federico Coria	78	6–2, 6–1, 7–5
3R	(United States) Jenson Brooksby	43	6–3, 6–3, 6–3
4R	(Croatia) Marin Čilić (15)	17	6–4, 3–6, 6–4, 4–6, 6–3
QF	(Italy) Jannik Sinner (11)	13	6–3, 6–7^{(7–9)}, 6–7^{(0–7)}, 7–5, 6–3
SF	(United States) Frances Tiafoe (27)	26	6–7^{(6–8)}, 6–3, 6–1, 6–7^{(5–7)}, 6–3
**W**	(Norway) Casper Ruud (5)	**7**	6–4, 2–6, 7–6^{(7–1)}, 6–3
2025 US Open (2nd seed)
Rd	Opponent	Rnk	Score
1R	(United States) Reilly Opelka	67	6–4, 7–5, 6–4
2R	(Italy) Mattia Bellucci	65	6–1, 6–0, 6–3
3R	(Italy) Luciano Darderi (32)	34	6–2, 6–4, 6–0
4R	(France) Arthur Rinderknech	82	7–6^{(7–3)}, 6–3, 6–4
QF	(Czech Republic) Jiří Lehečka (20)	21	6–4, 6–2, 6–4
SF	(Serbia) Novak Djokovic (7)	**7**	6–4, 7–6^{(7–4)}, 6–2
**W**	(Italy) Jannik Sinner (1)	**1**	6–2, 3–6, 6–1, 6–4

=== Grand Slam tournament seedings ===
The tournaments won by Alcaraz are in boldface, and advanced into finals by Alcaraz are in italics.

Legend seeded No. 1 (**2** / 4) seeded No. 2 (**2** / 5) seeded No. 3 (**3** / 5) seeded No. 4–10 (0 / 2) seeded No. 11–32 (0 / 1) unseeded (0 / 4)	Longest / total: 3 / 21; 3 / 21; 4 / 21; 2 / 21; 1 / 21; 4 / 21

Year	Australian Open	French Open	Wimbledon	US Open
2020	Did not play	Did not qualify	tournament cancelled (Note: Due to the COVID-19 pandemic, the 2020 edition of the Wimbledon Championships was cancelled.)	Did not play
2021	Unseeded	Unseeded	Unseeded	Unseeded
2022	31st	6th	5th	**3rd (1)**
2023	Did not play	1st	**1st (2)**	1st
2024	2nd	**3rd (3)**	**3rd (4)**	3rd
2025	3rd	**2nd (5)**	2nd (1)	**2nd (6)**
2026	**1st (7)**	Did not play	Did not play	2nd
2027				

== ATP ranking ==
Carlos Alcaraz has spent in total 66 weeks as ATP world No. 1.

=== Timeline ===
Year	2018	2019	2020	2021	2022	2023	2024	2025	2026	2027
High	1407	489	136	32	1	1	2	1	1	3
Low	1495	597	490	146	33	2	3	3	3	
End	1491	492	141	32	1	2	3	1	3	

==== Weeks statistics ====
Weeks in top	Total weeks
at number 1	66
top 5	227*
top 10	240*
top 20	249*
top 50	272*
top 100	288*

*as of 23 November 2026.

=== ATP world No. 1 ===
==== Weeks at No. 1 by span ====
Stint	Start date	End date	Weeks	Total
1	12 September 2022	29 January 2023	20	20
2	22 March 2023	2 April 2023	2	22
3	20 May 2023	11 June 2023	3	25
4	26 June 2023	10 September 2023	11	36
5	8 September 2025	2 November 2025	8	44
6	10 November 2025	12 April 2026	22	66

==== World No. 1 ranking records ====
Category	Weeks/ Times (years)
Overall Weeks at No. 1	66
Consecutive Weeks at No. 1 highest streak	22
Year-end No. 1	2 (2022, 2025)
Year-end No. 1 consecutive streak	1 (2022, 2025)

==== Age at first and last dates No. 1 ranking was held ====
Birthdate	Age first held No. 1	Age last held No. 1
5 May 2003 (age 23)	19 years, 130 days	22 years, 342 days

== Wins over top-10 players ==
- Alcaraz has a 64–26 (71.1%) record against players who were, at the time the match was played, ranked in the top 10.
- Alcaraz has beaten a №1-ranked player 7 times in his career (Alexander Zverev and Novak Djokovic 1 time & Jannik Sinner 5 times).

Season	2021	2022	2023	2024	2025	2026	Total
Wins	3	9	11	12	17	12	64

#	Player	Rk	Event	Surface	Rd	Score	Rk	Ref
2021
1.	(Greece) Stefanos Tsitsipas	3	US Open, USA	Hard	3R	6–3, 4–6, 7–6^{(7–2)}, 0–6, 7–6^{(7–5)}	55	
2.	(Italy) Matteo Berrettini	7	Vienna Open, Austria	Hard (i)	QF	6–1, 6–7^{(2–7)}, 7–6^{(7–5)}	42	
3.	(Italy) Jannik Sinner	9	Paris Masters, France	Hard (i)	2R	7–6^{(7–1)}, 7–5	35	
2022
4.	(Italy) Matteo Berrettini	6	Rio Open, Brazil	Clay	QF	6–2, 2–6, 6–2	29	
5.	(Greece) Stefanos Tsitsipas	5	Miami Open, USA	Hard	4R	7–5, 6–3	16	
6.	(Poland) Hubert Hurkacz	10	Miami Open, USA	Hard	SF	7–6^{(7–5)}, 7–6^{(7–2)}	16	
7.	(Norway) Casper Ruud	8	Miami Open, USA	Hard	F	7–5, 6–4	16	
8.	(Greece) Stefanos Tsitsipas	5	Barcelona Open, Spain	Clay	QF	6–4, 5–7, 6–2	11	
9.	(Spain) Rafael Nadal	4	Madrid Open, Spain	Clay	QF	6–2, 1–6, 6–3	9	
10.	(Serbia) Novak Djokovic	1	Madrid Open, Spain	Clay	SF	6–7^{(5–7)}, 7–5, 7–6^{(7–5)}	9	
11.	(Germany) Alexander Zverev	3	Madrid Open, Spain	Clay	F	6–3, 6–1	9	
12.	(Norway) Casper Ruud	7	US Open, USA	Hard	F	6–4, 2–6, 7–6^{(7–1)}, 6–3	4	
2023
13.	(Canada) Félix Auger-Aliassime	10	Indian Wells Open, USA	Hard	QF	6–4, 6–4	2	
14.	Daniil Medvedev	6	Indian Wells Open, USA	Hard	F	6–3, 6–2	2	
15.	(United States) Taylor Fritz	10	Miami Open, USA	Hard	QF	6–4, 6–2	1	
16.	(Greece) Stefanos Tsitsipas	5	Barcelona Open, Spain	Clay	F	6–3, 6–4	2	
17.	(Greece) Stefanos Tsitsipas	5	French Open, France	Clay	QF	6–2, 6–1, 7–6^{(7–5)}	1	
18.	(Denmark) Holger Rune	6	Wimbledon, UK	Grass	QF	7–6^{(7–3)}, 6–4, 6–4	1	
19.	Daniil Medvedev	3	Wimbledon, UK	Grass	SF	6–3, 6–3, 6–3	1	
20.	(Serbia) Novak Djokovic	2	Wimbledon, UK	Grass	F	1–6, 7–6^{(8–6)}, 6–1, 3–6, 6–4	1	
21.	(Norway) Casper Ruud	9	China Open, China	Hard	QF	6–4, 6–2	2	
22.	Andrey Rublev	5	ATP Finals, Italy	Hard (i)	RR	7–5, 6–2	2	
23.	Daniil Medvedev	3	ATP Finals, Italy	Hard (i)	RR	6–4, 6–4	2	
2024
24.	(Germany) Alexander Zverev	6	Indian Wells Open, USA	Hard	QF	6–3, 6–1	2	
25.	(Italy) Jannik Sinner	3	Indian Wells Open, USA	Hard	SF	1–6, 6–3, 6–2	2	
26.	Daniil Medvedev	4	Indian Wells Open, USA	Hard	F	7–6^{(7–5)}, 6–1	2	
27.	(Greece) Stefanos Tsitsipas	9	French Open, France	Clay	QF	6–3, 7–6^{(7–3)}, 6–4	3	
28.	(Italy) Jannik Sinner	2	French Open, France	Clay	SF	2–6, 6–3, 3–6, 6–4, 6–3	3	
29.	(Germany) Alexander Zverev	4	French Open, France	Clay	F	6–3, 2–6, 5–7, 6–1, 6–2	3	
30.	Daniil Medvedev	5	Wimbledon, UK	Grass	SF	6–7^{(1–7)}, 6–3, 6–4, 6–4	3	
31.	(Serbia) Novak Djokovic	2	Wimbledon, UK	Grass	F	6–2, 6–2, 7–6^{(7–4)}	3	
32.	(United States) Taylor Fritz	7	Laver Cup, Germany	Hard (i)	RR	6–2, 7–5	3	
33.	Daniil Medvedev	5	China Open, China	Hard	SF	7–5, 6–3	3	
34.	(Italy) Jannik Sinner	1	China Open, China	Hard	F	6–7^{(6–8)}, 6–4, 7–6^{(7–3)}	3	
35.	Andrey Rublev	8	ATP Finals, Italy	Hard (i)	RR	6–3, 7–6^{(10–8)}	3	
2025
36.	(Australia) Alex de Minaur	8	Rotterdam Open, Netherlands	Hard (i)	F	6–4, 3–6, 6–2	3	
37.	(Australia) Alex de Minaur	7	Barcelona Open, Spain	Clay	QF	7–5, 6–3	2	
38.	(United Kingdom) Jack Draper	5	Italian Open, Italy	Clay	QF	6–4, 6–4	3	
39.	(Italy) Lorenzo Musetti	9	Italian Open, Italy	Clay	SF	6–3, 7–6^{(7–4)}	3	
40.	(Italy) Jannik Sinner	1	Italian Open, Italy	Clay	F	7–6^{(7–5)}, 6–1	3	
41.	(Italy) Lorenzo Musetti	7	French Open, France	Clay	SF	4–6, 7–6^{(7–3)}, 6–0, 2–0 ret.	2	
42.	(Italy) Jannik Sinner	1	French Open, France	Clay	F	4–6, 6–7^{(4–7)}, 6–4, 7–6^{(7–3)}, 7–6^{(10–2)}	2	
43.	(United States) Taylor Fritz	5	Wimbledon, UK	Grass	SF	6–4, 5–7, 6–3, 7–6^{(8–6)}	2	
44.	(Germany) Alexander Zverev	3	Cincinnati Open, USA	Hard	SF	6–4, 6–3	2	
45.	(Italy) Jannik Sinner	1	Cincinnati Open, USA	Hard	F	5–0 ret.	2	
46.	(Serbia) Novak Djokovic	7	US Open, USA	Hard	SF	6–4, 7–6^{(7–4)}, 6–2	2	
47.	(Italy) Jannik Sinner	1	US Open, USA	Hard	F	6–2, 3–6, 6–1, 6–4	2	
48.	(United States) Taylor Fritz	5	Japan Open, Japan	Hard	F	6–4, 6–4	1	
49.	(Australia) Alex de Minaur	7	ATP Finals, Italy	Hard (i)	RR	7–6^{(7–5)}, 6–2	2	
50.	(United States) Taylor Fritz	6	ATP Finals, Italy	Hard (i)	RR	6–7^{(2–7)}, 7–5, 6–3	1	
51.	(Italy) Lorenzo Musetti	9	ATP Finals, Italy	Hard (i)	RR	6–4, 6–1	1	
52.	(Canada) Félix Auger-Aliassime	8	ATP Finals, Italy	Hard (i)	SF	6–2, 6–4	1	
2026
53.	(Australia) Alex de Minaur	6	Australian Open, Australia	Hard	QF	7–5, 6–2, 6–1	1	
54.	(Germany) Alexander Zverev	3	Australian Open, Australia	Hard	SF	6–4, 7–6^{(7–5)}, 6–7^{(3–7)}, 6–7^{(4–7)}, 7–5	1	
55.	(Serbia) Novak Djokovic	4	Australian Open, Australia	Hard	F	2–6, 6–2, 6–3, 7–5	1	
56.	(United States) Taylor Fritz	10	Laver Cup, UK	Hard (i)	RR	6–3, 4–6, [13–11]	3	
57.	Daniil Medvedev	5	Vienna Open, Austria	Hard (i)	SF	6–4, 7–6^{(7–2)}	3	
58.	(Australia) Alex de Minaur	10	Vienna Open, Austria	Hard (i)	F	6–1, 6–4	3	
59.	(United States) Ben Shelton	4	Paris Masters, France	Hard (i)	F	7–6^{(7–5)}, 7–5	3	
60.	(United States) Frances Tiafoe	8	ATP Finals, Italy	Hard (i)	RR	6–2, 6–2	3	
61.	Daniil Medvedev	5	ATP Finals, Italy	Hard (i)	RR	6–2, 6–4	3	
62.	(Italy) Flavio Cobolli	6	ATP Finals, Italy	Hard (i)	RR	6–4, 6–1	3	
63.	(United States) Ben Shelton	4	ATP Finals, Italy	Hard (i)	SF	3–6, 6–3, 7–6^{(7–1)}	3	
64.	(Germany) Alexander Zverev	1	ATP Finals, Italy	Hard (i)	F	6–2, 7–6^{(9–7)}	3	

- Key: (Rk) first use, opponent rank; (Rd) round; (Rk) 2nd use, player rank; (Ref) reference; (F) final; (SF) semifinal; (QF) quarterfinal; (#R) rounds 4, 3, 2, 1; (RR) round-robin stage; (Q#) qualifying rounds or stages (3), 2, 1.

* As of 21 November 2026.

== Winning streaks ==
Alcaraz has ten 10+ match win streaks in his career (as of November 18, 2026), his longest being 24 in (2025) He has also had a 34 match win streak on outdoor hard courts, joint third best all time.

=== 24-match win streak (2025) ===
No.	Tournament	Tier	Start date	Surface	Round	Opponent	Rank	Score
–	Barcelona Open	ATP; 500	14 April 2025	Clay	F	(Denmark) Holger Rune (6)	13	6–7^{(6–8)}, 2–6
–	Italian Open	ATP; 1000	7 May 2025	Clay	1R	Bye		
1	Italian Open	ATP; 1000	7 May 2025	Clay	2R	(Serbia) Dušan Lajović (Q)	131	6–3, 6–3
2	Italian Open	ATP; 1000	7 May 2025	Clay	3R	(Serbia) Laslo Djere	64	7–6^{(7–2)}, 6–2
3	Italian Open	ATP; 1000	7 May 2025	Clay	4R	Karen Khachanov (23)	24	6–3, 3–6, 7–5
4	Italian Open	ATP; 1000	7 May 2025	Clay	QF	(United Kingdom) Jack Draper (5)	5	6–4, 6–4
5	Italian Open	ATP; 1000	7 May 2025	Clay	SF	(Italy) Lorenzo Musetti (8)	9	6–3, 7–6^{(7–4)}
6	Italian Open	ATP; 1000	7 May 2025	Clay	F	(Italy) Jannik Sinner (1)	1	7–6^{(7–5)}, 6–1
7	French Open	Grand; Slam	25 May 2025	Clay	1R	(Italy) Giulio Zeppieri (Q)	310	6–3, 6–4, 6–2
8	French Open	Grand; Slam	25 May 2025	Clay	2R	(Hungary) Fábián Marozsán	56	6–1, 4–6, 6–1, 6–2
9	French Open	Grand; Slam	25 May 2025	Clay	3R	(Bosnia and Herzegovina) Damir Džumhur	69	6–1, 6–3, 4–6, 6–4
10	French Open	Grand; Slam	25 May 2025	Clay	4R	(United States) Ben Shelton (13)	13	7–6^{(10–8)}, 6–3, 4–6, 6–4
11	French Open	Grand; Slam	25 May 2025	Clay	QF	(United States) Tommy Paul (12)	12	6–0, 6–1, 6–4
12	French Open	Grand; Slam	25 May 2025	Clay	SF	(Italy) Lorenzo Musetti (8)	7	4–6, 7–6^{(7–3)}, 6–0, 2–0 ret.
13	French Open	Grand; Slam	25 May 2025	Clay	F	(Italy) Jannik Sinner (1)	1	4–6, 6–7^{(4–7)}, 6–4, 7–6^{(7–3)}, 7–6^{(10–2)}
14	Queen's Club; Championships	ATP; 500	16 June 2025	Grass	1R	(Australia) Adam Walton (LL)	86	6–4, 7–6^{(7–4)}
15	Queen's Club; Championships	ATP; 500	16 June 2025	Grass	2R	(Spain) Jaume Munar	59	6–4, 6–7^{(7–9)}, 7–5
16	Queen's Club; Championships	ATP; 500	16 June 2025	Grass	QF	(France) Arthur Rinderknech (LL)	80	7–5, 6–4
17	Queen's Club; Championships	ATP; 500	16 June 2025	Grass	SF	(Spain) Roberto Bautista Agut	51	6–4, 6–4
18	Queen's Club; Championships	ATP; 500	16 June 2025	Grass	F	(Czech Republic) Jiří Lehečka	30	7–5, 6–7^{(5–7)}, 6–2
19	Wimbledon	Grand; Slam	30 June 2025	Grass	1R	(Italy) Fabio Fognini	138	7–5, 6–7^{(5–7)}, 7–5, 2–6, 6–1
20	Wimbledon	Grand; Slam	30 June 2025	Grass	2R	(United Kingdom) Oliver Tarvet (Q)	733	6–1, 6–4, 6–4
21	Wimbledon	Grand; Slam	30 June 2025	Grass	3R	(Germany) Jan-Lennard Struff	125	6–1, 3–6, 6–3, 6–4
22	Wimbledon	Grand; Slam	30 June 2025	Grass	4R	Andrey Rublev (14)	14	6–7^{(5–7)}, 6–3, 6–4, 6–4
23	Wimbledon	Grand; Slam	30 June 2025	Grass	QF	(United Kingdom) Cameron Norrie	61	6–2, 6–3, 6–3
24	Wimbledon	Grand; Slam	30 June 2025	Grass	SF	(United States) Taylor Fritz (5)	5	6–4, 5–7, 6–3, 7–6^{(8–6)}
–	Wimbledon	Grand; Slam	30 June 2025	Grass	F	(Italy) Jannik Sinner (1)	1	6–4, 4–6, 4–6, 4–6

== ATP Tour career earnings ==
Year	Grand Slam titles	ATP titles	Total singles titles	Earnings ($)	Money list rank
2018	0	0	0	$492	2418
2019	0	0	0	$12,211	757
2020	0	0	0	$81,932	243
2021	0	1	1	$1,632,678	16
2022	1	4	5	$10,102,330	1
2023	1	5	6	$15,196,504	2
2024	2	2	4	$10,358,429	3
2025	2	6	8	$21,354,778	1
2026	1	4	5	$7,318,342	3
Career	7	22	29	$69,137,608	6

* Statistics correct as of 9 November 2026.

== National and international representation ==
=== Team competitions finals: 4 (2 title, 2 runner-ups) ===
Finals by tournament Olympic Games (0–1) Davis Cup (0–0) Laver Cup (2–1)	Finals by team Spain (0–1) Europe (2–1)

Result	W–L	Date	Tournament	Surface	Team	Partner(s)	Opponent team	Opponent(s)	Score
Loss	0–1	Aug 2024	Olympic Games	Hard (i)	Spain	–	Serbia	Novak Djokovic	0–2
Win	1–1	Sep 2024	Laver Cup	Hard (i)	Team Europe	Alexander Zverev; Daniil Medvedev; Casper Ruud; Grigor Dimitrov; Stefanos Tsitsipas	Team World	Taylor Fritz; Frances Tiafoe; Ben Shelton; Alejandro Tabilo; Francisco Cerúndolo; Thanasi Kokkinakis	13–11
Loss	1–2	Sep 2025	Laver Cup	Hard (i)	Team Europe	Alexander Zverev; Holger Rune; Casper Ruud; Jakub Menšík; Flavio Cobolli	Team World	Taylor Fritz; Alex de Minaur; Francisco Cerúndolo; Alex Michelsen; João Fonseca; Reilly Opelka	9–15
Win	2–2	Sep 2026	Laver Cup	Hard (i)	Team Europe	Alexander Zverev; Flavio Cobolli; Rafael Jódar; Jakub Menšík; Casper Ruud	Team World	Alex de Minaur; Taylor Fritz; Learner Tien; Brandon Nakashima; Alexander Bublik; Francisco Cerúndolo	13–5

=== Summer Olympics (silver medal) ===
==== (7 wins – 2 losses) ====
Matches by tournament 2024 Paris Olympics (7–2)	Olympic medals: 1 Silver medals: 1	Matches by medal finals Gold medal final (0–1)	Matches by type Singles (5–1) Doubles (2–1)	Matches by surface Clay (7–2)	Matches by setting Outdoors (7–2)

==== Singles (5–1) ====
Result	W-L	Year	Surface	Opponent	Rd	Score
Win	1–0	2024	Clay	Hady Habib (LBN) (Alt)	1R	6–3, 6–1
Win	2–0	2024	Clay	Tallon Griekspoor (NED)	2R	6–1, 7–6^{(7–3)}
Win	3–0	2024	Clay	Roman Safiullin (AIN)	3R	6–4, 6–2
Win	4–0	2024	Clay	Tommy Paul (USA) (9)	QF	6–3, 7–6^{(9–7)}
Win	5–0	2024	Clay	Félix Auger-Aliassime (CAN) (13)	SF	6–1, 6–1
Loss	5–1	2024	Clay	Novak Djokovic (SRB) (1)	S	6–7^{(3–7)}, 6–7^{(2–7)}

==== Doubles (2–1) ====
Result	W-L	Year	Surface	Partner	Opponent	Rd	Score
Win	1–0	2024	Clay	Rafael Nadal	Máximo González / Andrés Molteni (ARG) (6)	1R	7–6^{(7–4)}, 6–4
Win	2–0	2024	Clay	Rafael Nadal	Tallon Griekspoor / Wesley Koolhof (NED)	2R	6–4, 6–7^{(2–7)}, [10–2]
Loss	2–1	2024	Clay	Rafael Nadal	Austin Krajicek / Rajeev Ram (USA) (4)	QF	2–6, 4–6

=== Davis Cup (6–2) ===
Group membership World Group / Finals (6–2)	Matches by surface Hard (5–2) Clay (1–0)	Matches by type Singles (5–1) Doubles (1–1)	Matches by setting Indoors (6–2)	Matches by venue Spain (6–2)

- ▲ ▼ indicates the result of the Davis Cup match followed by the score, date, place of event, the zonal classification and its phase, and the court surface.

Result	No.	Rubber	Match type (partner if any)	Opponent nation	Opponent player(s)	Score
▲3–1; 4–5 March 2022; Club de Tenis Puente Romano, Marbella, Spain; Davis Cup Finals – qualifying round; clay surface
Win	1	II	Singles	Romania	Marius Copil	6–4, 6–3
▼1–2; 16 September 2022; Pavelló Municipal Font de Sant Lluís, Valencia, Spain; Davis Cup Finals – round robin; hard (i) surface
Loss	2	II	Singles	Canada	Félix Auger-Aliassime	7–6^{(7–3)}, 4–6, 2–6
▲3–0; 16 September 2022; Pavelló Municipal Font de Sant Lluís, Valencia, Spain; Davis Cup Finals – round robin; hard (i) surface
Win	3	II	Singles	South Korea	Kwon Soon-woo	6–4, 7–6^{(7–1)}
▲3–0; 11 September 2024; Pavelló Municipal Font de Sant Lluís, Valencia, Spain; Davis Cup Finals – round robin; hard (i) surface
Win	4	II	Singles	Czech Republic	Tomáš Macháč	6–7^{(3–7)}, 6–1 retired
Win	5	III	Doubles (with Marcel Granollers)	Czech Republic	Jakub Menšík / Adam Pavlásek	6–7^{(2–7)}, 6–3, 7–6^{(7–2)}
▲2–1; 13 September 2024; Pavelló Municipal Font de Sant Lluís, Valencia, Spain; Davis Cup Finals – round robin; hard (i) surface
Win	6	II	Singles	France	Ugo Humbert	6–3, 6–3
▼1–2; 19 November 2024; Martín Carpena Arena, Málaga, Spain; Davis Cup Finals – quarterfinals; hard (i) surface
Win	7	II	Singles	Netherlands	Tallon Griekspoor	7–6^{(7–0)}, 6–3
Loss	8	III	Doubles (with Marcel Granollers)	Netherlands	Wesley Koolhof / Botic van de Zandschulp	6–7^{(4–7)}, 6–7^{(3–7)}

=== Hopman Cup ===
==== (2 wins – 2 losses) ====
Legend
Ties (2–0)
Rubbers (2–2)

Matches by Type
Singles (2–0)
Mixed doubles (0–2)

- ▲ ▼ indicates the result of the Hopman Cup match followed by the score, date, place of event, competition phase, and the court surface.

Result	No.	Match type (partner if any)	Opponent nation	Opponent player(s)	Score	Ref
▼1–2; 21 July 2023; Nice Lawn Tennis Club, Nice, France; round robin; clay surface
Win	1	Singles	Belgium	David Goffin	4–6, 6–4, [10–8]	
Loss	2	Mixed Doubles (with Rebeka Masarova) (decider)	Belgium	Elise Mertens / David Goffin	3–6, 1–6	
▼1–2; 22 July 2023; Nice Lawn Tennis Club, Nice, France; round robin; clay surface
Win	3	Singles	Croatia	Borna Ćorić	6–3, 6–7^{(6–8)}, [10–5]	
Loss	4	Mixed Doubles (with Rebeka Masarova) (decider)	Croatia	Donna Vekić / Borna Ćorić	6–1, 4–6, [12–14]	

=== Laver Cup ===
==== Laver Cup matches (6–2) ====
Matches by type Singles (3–1) Doubles (3–1)	Matches by points scoring Day 1, 1 point (1–1) Day 2, 2 points (1–1) Day 3, 3 points (4–0)	Matches by venue Europe (3–1) Rest of the World (3–1)

- ▲ ▼ indicates the result of the Laver Cup match followed by the score, date, place of event and the court surface.

No.	Day (points)	Match type (partner if any)	Opponent team	Opponent player(s)	Result	Score
▲13–11; 20–22 September 2024; Uber Arena, Berlin, Germany; hard (i) surface
1	Day 1 (1 point)	Doubles (with (Germany) Alexander Zverev)	Team World	(United States) Taylor Fritz / (United States) Ben Shelton	Loss	6–7^{(5–7)}, 4–6
2	Day 2 (2 points)	Singles	Team World	(United States) Ben Shelton	Win	6–4, 6–4
3	Day 3 (3 points)	Doubles (with (Norway) Casper Ruud)	Team World	(United States) Ben Shelton / (United States) Frances Tiafoe	Win	6–2, 7–6^{(8–6)}
4	Day 3 (3 points)	Singles	Team World	(United States) Taylor Fritz	Win	6–2, 7–5
▼9–15; 19–21 September 2025; Chase Center, San Francisco, United States; hard (i) surface
5	Day 1 (1 point)	Doubles (with (Czech Republic) Jakub Menšík)	Team World	(United States) Taylor Fritz / (United States) Alex Michelsen	Win	7–6^{(9–7)}, 6–4
6	Day 2 (2 points)	Singles	Team World	(United States) Taylor Fritz	Loss	3–6, 2–6
7	Day 3 (3 points)	Doubles (with (Norway) Casper Ruud)	Team World	(United States) Alex Michelsen / (United States) Reilly Opelka	Win	7–6^{(7–4)}, 6–1
8	Day 3 (3 points)	Singles	Team World	(Argentina) Francisco Cerúndolo	Win	6–2, 6–1

==== Wins: 1 ====
Edition	Team Europe	Rounds/Opponents
2024 Laver Cup	(Germany) Alexander Zverev (Spain) Carlos Alcaraz; Daniil Medvedev (Norway) Casper Ruud (Bulgaria) Grigor Dimitrov (Greece) Stefanos Tsitsipas	F: EUR 13–11 WOR

==== Losses: 1 ====
Edition	Team Europe	Rounds/Opponents
2025 Laver Cup	(Spain) Carlos Alcaraz (Germany) Alexander Zverev (Denmark) Holger Rune (Norway) Casper Ruud (Czech Republic) Jakub Menšík (Italy) Flavio Cobolli	F: EUR 9–15 WOR

== Exhibition Finals ==
==== Singles: 2 (2 runner-ups) ====
Outcome	W–L	Date	Tournament	Surface	Opponent	Score
Loss	0–1	Oct 2024	Six Kings Slam, Riyadh, Saudi Arabia	Hard (i)	(Italy) Jannik Sinner	7–6^{(7–5)}, 3–6, 3–6
Loss	0–2	Oct 2025	Six Kings Slam, Riyadh, Saudi Arabia (2)	Hard (i)	(Italy) Jannik Sinner	2–6, 4–6

== Exhibition matches ==
=== Singles ===
Result	Date	Tournament	Surface	Opponent	Score
Loss	Jun 2022	Giorgio Armani Tennis Classic, London, United Kingdom	Grass	(United States) Frances Tiafoe	4–6, 4–6
Loss	Jun 2022	Giorgio Armani Tennis Classic, London, United Kingdom	Grass	(Norway) Casper Ruud	6–7^{(2–7)}, 2–6
Loss	Dec 2022	Mubadala World Tennis Championship, Abu Dhabi, United Arab Emirates	Hard	(Norway) Casper Ruud	1–6, 4–6
Win	Nov 2023	Tennis Fest, Mexico City, Mexico	Hard	(United States) Tommy Paul	7–6^{(7–3)}, 6–3
Win	Dec 2023	Riyadh Season Tennis Cup, Riyadh, Saudi Arabia	Hard	(Serbia) Novak Djokovic	4–6, 6–4, 6–4
Win	Dec 2023	Carlos Alcaraz Cup, Murcia, Spain	Hard (i)	(Spain) Roberto Bautista Agut	7–6^{(7–1)}, 1–6, [10–7]
Loss	Jan 2024	Australian Open Opening Week, Melbourne, Australia	Hard	(Australia) Alex de Minaur	4–6, 7–5, [3–10]
Win	Jan 2024	Australian Open Opening Week, Melbourne, Australia	Hard	(Norway) Casper Ruud	6–4, 6–2
Win	Mar 2024	The Netflix Slam, Las Vegas, United States	Hard (i)	(Spain) Rafael Nadal	3–6, 6–4, [14–12]
Win	Oct 2024	6 Kings Slam, Riyadh, Saudi Arabia	Hard (i)	(Denmark) Holger Rune	6–4, 6–2
Win	Oct 2024	6 Kings Slam, Riyadh, Saudi Arabia	Hard (i)	(Spain) Rafael Nadal	6–3, 6–3
Loss	Oct 2024	6 Kings Slam, Riyadh, Saudi Arabia	Hard (i)	(Italy) Jannik Sinner	7–6^{(7–5)}, 3–6, 3–6
Win	Dec 2024	The Garden Cup, New York, United States	Hard	(United States) Ben Shelton	4–6, 6–2, [7–4]
Loss	Dec 2024	Charlotte Invitational, Charlotte, United States	Hard (i)	(United States) Frances Tiafoe	5–7, 6–1, [9–11]
Loss	Jan 2025	Australian Open Opening Week, Melbourne, Australia	Hard	(Australia) Alex de Minaur	5–7, 6–4, [5–10]
Win	Jan 2025	Australian Open Opening Week, Melbourne, Australia	Hard	(Australia) Alexei Popyrin	6–3, 7–5
Win	Mar 2025	La Batalla de Leyendas, San Juan, Puerto Rico	Hard	(United States) Frances Tiafoe	6–4, 3–6, 6–4
Win	Oct 2025	6 Kings Slam, Riyadh, Saudi Arabia	Hard (i)	(United States) Taylor Fritz	6–4, 6–2
Loss	Oct 2025	6 Kings Slam, Riyadh, Saudi Arabia	Hard (i)	(Italy) Jannik Sinner	2–6, 4–6
Loss	Dec 2025	A Racquet at the Rock, Newark, United States	Hard (i)	(United States) Frances Tiafoe	3–6, 6–3, [7–10]
Win	Dec 2025	Miami Invitational, Miami, United States	Hard (i)	(Brazil) João Fonseca	7–5, 2–6, [10–8]
Win	Jan 2026	Hyundai Card Super Match, Seoul, South Korea	Hard (i)	(Italy) Jannik Sinner	7–5, 7–6^{(8–6)}
Win	Jan 2026	Australian Open Opening Week, Melbourne, Australia	Hard	(Australia) Alex de Minaur	6–3, 6–4
Pending	Dec 2026	2026 Six Kings Slam, Riyadh, Saudi Arabia	Hard (i)	TBD	

=== Doubles ===
Result	Date	Tournament	Surface	Partner	Opponents	Score
Win	Aug 2023	Stars of the Open, New York, United States	Hard	(Colombia) Sebastián Yatra	(United States) Jimmy Butler (United States) Frances Tiafoe	[15–13]
Loss	Aug 2024	Stars of the Open, New York, United States	Hard	(United States) Andre Agassi	(Serbia) Novak Djokovic (United States) John McEnroe	[8–10]

=== Mixed doubles ===
Result	Date	Tournament	Surface	Partner	Opponents	Score
Win	Dec 2025	A Racquet at the Rock, Newark, United States	Hard (i)	(United States) Jessica Pegula	(United States) Frances Tiafoe (United States) Amanda Anisimova	10–8
Win	Dec 2025	Miami Invitational, Miami, United States	Hard (i)	(United States) Jessica Pegula	(Brazil) João Fonseca (United States) Amanda Anisimova	10–8

== See also ==
- List of Grand Slam men's singles champions
- ATP Masters 1000 singles records and statistics
- List of ATP number 1 ranked singles tennis players
- List of male singles tennis players
- List of Open Era Grand Slam champions by country
- Chronological list of men's Grand Slam tennis champions
- List of ATP Big Titles singles champions
- List of tennis title leaders in the Open Era
- List of highest ranked tennis players per country
- Top ten ranked male tennis players
- List of Olympic medalists in tennis
- Spain at the Olympics
- Spain Davis Cup team
- List of Spain Davis Cup team representatives
- ATP Finals appearances
- Alcaraz–Sinner rivalry
- Tennis in Spain
- Sport in Spain
