= 2025 Carlos Alcaraz tennis season =

Tennis player season

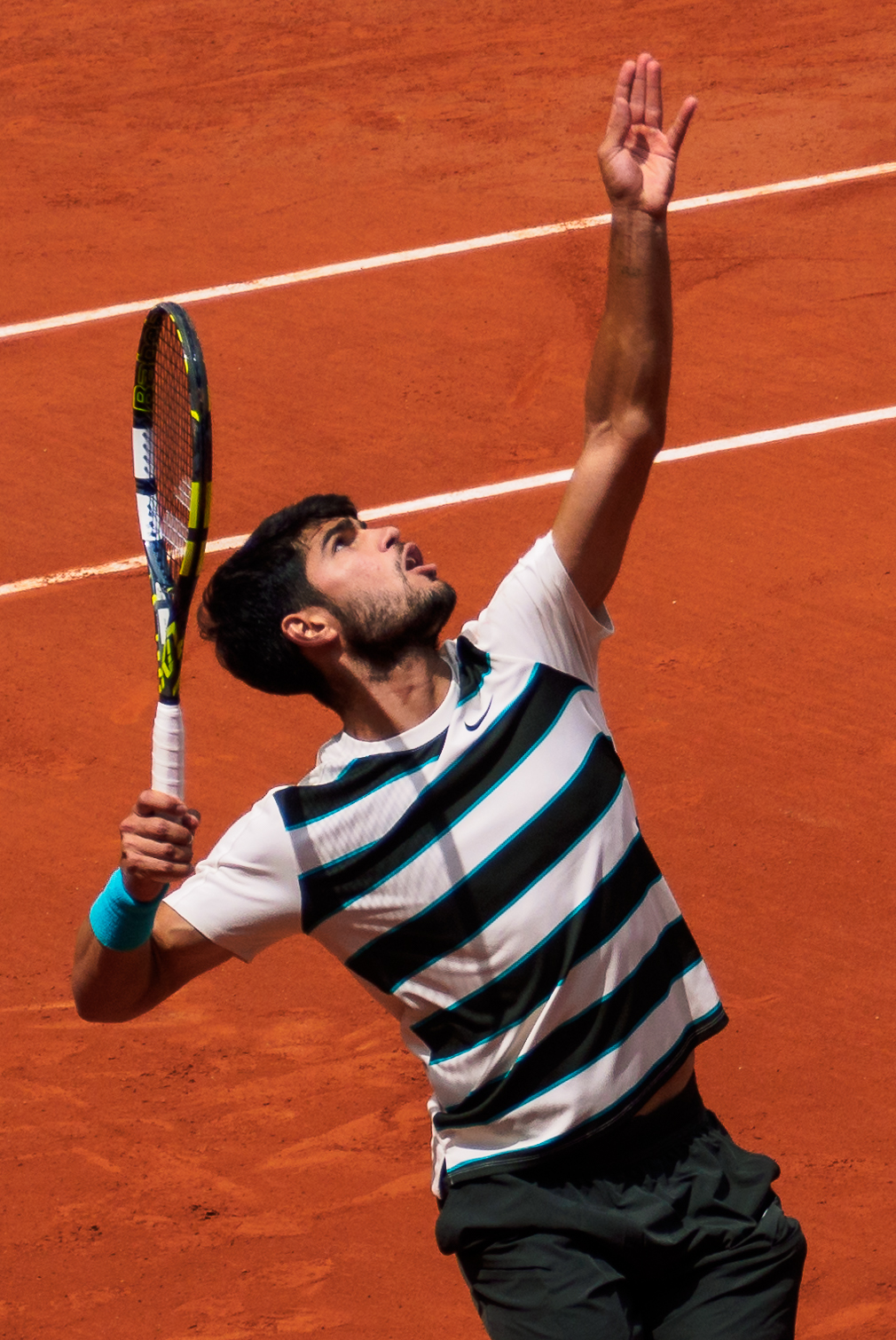
- Alcaraz at the 2025 French Open
- Full name: Carlos Alcaraz Garfia
- Country: Spain
- Calendar prize money: $21,354,778

Singles
- Season record: 71–9 (88.75%)
- Calendar titles: 8
- Year-end ranking: No. 1
- Ranking change from previous year: ▲2

Grand Slam & significant results
- Australian Open: QF
- French Open: W
- Wimbledon: F
- US Open: W
- Other tournaments
- Tour Finals: F

Doubles
- Season record: 2–0 (100%)
- Current ranking: no ranking
- Ranking change from previous year: Steady

Mixed doubles
- Season record: 0–1 (0%)

Injuries
- Injuries: Injury to right adductor (20 April); Injury to left hamstring (20 April); Injury to left ankle (25 September); Injury to right hamstring (18 November)

The 2025 Carlos Alcaraz tennis season officially began on 12 January 2025, with the start of the Australian Open in Melbourne.

During this season, Alcaraz:

- Clinched the year-end No. 1 ranking for a second time
- Won his second consecutive French Open title (fifth major title overall)
- Won his second US Open title (sixth major title overall)
- Won his first Monte Carlo, Rome, and Cincinnati titles (his sixth, seventh & eighth Masters titles)
- Won his first indoor hardcourt title
- Recorded his 250th career victory
- Claimed titles on grass, clay, and hard courts for a third consecutive year
- Made the quarterfinals of all four majors for the first time in his career
- Regained the world No. 1 ranking for the first time in two years, for a career total of 52 weeks (as of the end of the 2025 season)

== Yearly summary ==
=== Early hard court season ===
==== Australian Open ====
Alcaraz began his 2025 season at the Australian Open, where he was attempting to become the youngest man to complete the Career Grand Slam. During the December off-season, he had made a mechanical alteration to his serve and added five grams of lead to his racquet. He reached the quarterfinals for the second time in his career, where he lost a hotly anticipated contest with Novak Djokovic in four sets.

==== Rotterdam Open ====
Alcaraz then played the Rotterdam Open for the first time. In the first round, he defeated Botic van de Zandschulp in three sets, avenging his loss at the 2024 US Open. He scrapped through two more difficult three-setters in the semifinal (against Hubi Hurkacz) and in the final (against Alex de Minaur). This was the first indoor hardcourt title of Alcaraz's career. He became the first Spanish man to win at Rotterdam, and the youngest man to win titles on all four modern surfaces.

==== Qatar Open ====
Alcaraz then played the Qatar Open, also for the first time. He lost in the quarterfinals to Jiří Lehečka in three sets, despite breaking Lehečka's serve first in every set.

=== Sunshine Double tournaments ===
==== Indian Wells ====
Alcaraz entered Indian Wells as the two-time defending champion. In the round of 16, he recorded a double breadstick against Grigor Dimitrov. Alcaraz advanced past Francisco Cerúndolo to reach his first Masters semifinal in twelve months, where he lost to thirteenth seed Jack Draper despite bagelling him in the second set. This was Alcaraz's first loss after the quarterfinal round of a Tour-level tournament in over a year, and snapped his sixteen-match winning streak at Indian Wells.

==== Miami Open ====
Alcaraz lost his first match at Miami to 34-year old world No. 55 David Goffin in three sets. This marked just his third career opening-round defeat at a Masters tournament. Some commentators suggested he was in "crisis".

=== Clay season ===
==== Monte-Carlo Masters ====
Following a vacation in Mexico, Alcaraz began his clay season at the Monte-Carlo Masters. He had previously never won a match at this tournament. In the quarterfinal, Alcaraz came through a tight three-setter with Arthur Fils, in which he faced break points late in the second set and was down a break in the decider. This was the first competitive three-setter Alcaraz had won for several tournaments, and would prove to be a turning point in his season. In the final, he defeated an ailing Lorenzo Musetti in three sets. This was Alcaraz's first Masters title in thirteen months, and his sixth Masters title overall. Winning the final restored him as world No. 2. In his victory speech, he admitted, "It's been a really difficult month for me on the court and [off]."

==== Barcelona Open ====
Two days later, Alcaraz played his first match at the Barcelona Open, where he had not lost a match since 2021. Alcaraz did not drop a set before the final, where he lost to Holger Rune in straight sets. This result dropped him back to No. 3 in the world rankings, as his rival Alexander Zverev won the Munich Open in the same week. After the final, Alcaraz announced he would be undergoing an MRI to determine the extent of an injury to his right adductor. On 24 April, he held a press conference to announce he would be withdrawing from the Madrid Open with a tear in his right adductor and an injury to his left hamstring. This marked the third year in a row he was unable to play at least one of the clay season Masters due to injury.

==== Italian Open ====
Alcaraz recovered to play the Italian Open for the second time in his career. In the final, Alcaraz faced world No. 1 Jannik Sinner in their first meeting of the season. Alcaraz won in straight sets to claim his first Italian Open title. He became the third man to win every modern big title on clay (Roland Garros, Monte Carlo, Madrid, and Rome) after Rafael Nadal and Novak Djokovic. He also snapped Sinner's 26-match winning streak, and recorded his fourth victory against him in as many matches. Following the tournament, Alcaraz once again reclaimed the No. 2 ranking.

==== French Open ====
Alcaraz met Sinner in a second consecutive final to defend his title at the French Open. Sinner established a two-set lead before Alcaraz resurged to take the third set. In the fourth set, Sinner had three championship points on Alcaraz's serve at 5–3. Alcaraz held from 0–40 and then broke Sinner as he attempted to serve for the title. The players proceeded to a tiebreak, which Alcaraz won to force a fifth set. Alcaraz broke Sinner's serve immediately in the fifth, but was broken back as he himself tried to serve for the title at 5–4. Alcaraz eventually claimed the set and match in a dominant super tiebreak. At five hours and twenty-nine minutes, this was the longest-ever Roland Garros final, and the second longest major final of all time. It was the first time Alcaraz had ever made a comeback from two sets to love down, and his fifth consecutive win over the otherwise dominant Sinner. Alcaraz became the first man in the Open Era to win a slam final saving three or more championship points. Alcaraz became the second man in the Open Era to win four consecutive slams on natural surfaces, after Björn Borg, and the second man to win all five of his first major finals, after Roger Federer. Some commentators suggested this was the best performance of his career to date, as well as one of the best slam finals of all time.

=== Grass season ===
==== Queen's Club Championships ====
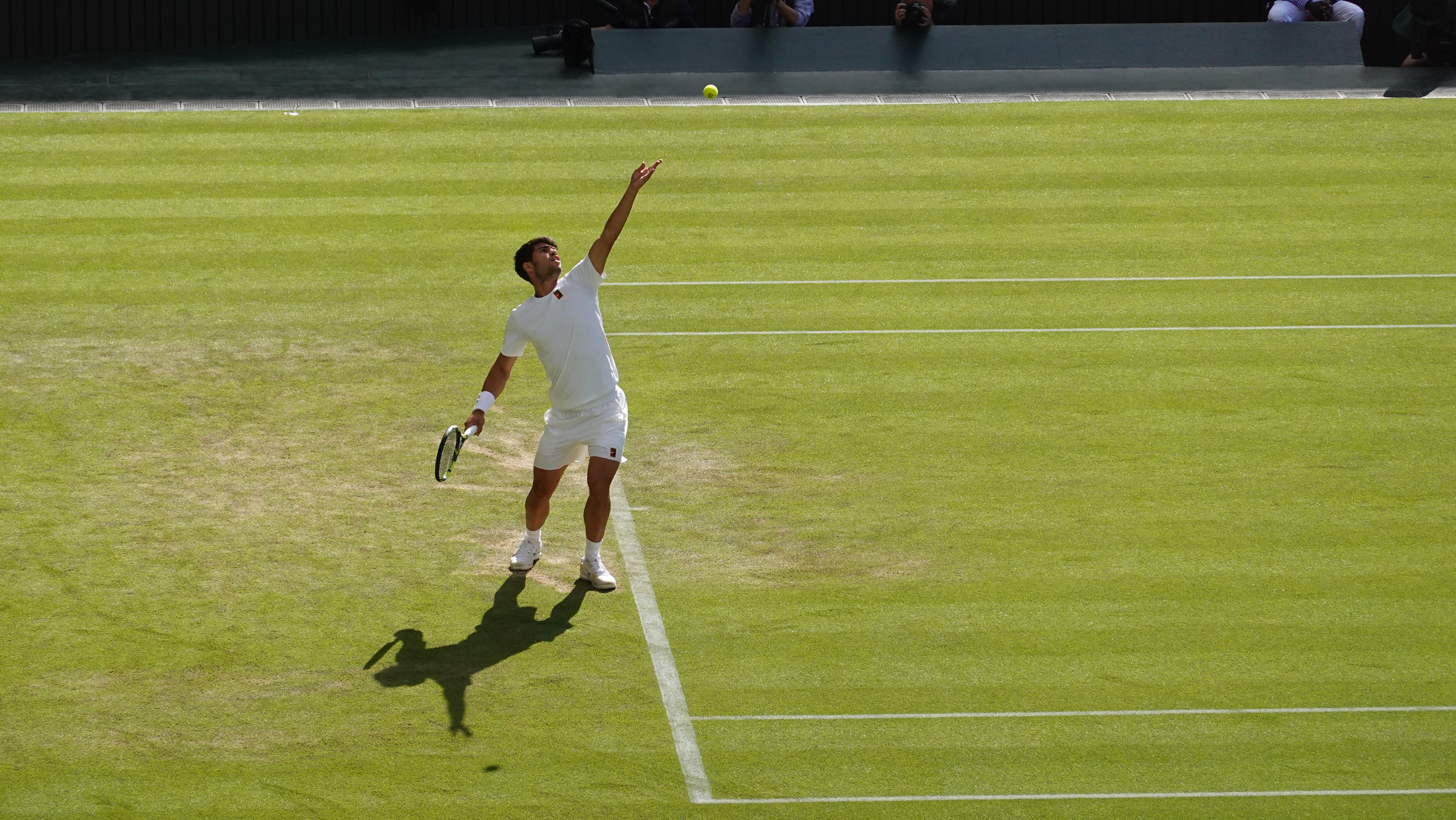
Alcaraz serving during a third round singles match at Wimbledon.

After a heavily publicised three-day break in Ibiza, Alcaraz began his grass season at the Queen's Club Championships. In the second round, Alcaraz won a marathon three-setter against compatriot Jaume Munar after failing to convert two match points in the second set. The match, which lasted three hours and 26 minutes, was the longest recorded at Queen's in 34 years. Alcaraz's straight sets semifinal win against Roberto Bautista Agut was his 250th tour level victory; he became the third-fastest man to achieve this milestone in the Open Era. Alcaraz defeated Jiří Lehečka in three sets in the final to claim his third consecutive title. This was the first time in his career he had won three titles back-to-back.

==== Wimbledon ====
In the first round of Wimbledon, Alcaraz was unexpectedly taken to five sets by Fabio Fognini, who had already announced his retirement and had not won a Tour-level match all season. In sluggish form, Alcaraz dropped sets to Jan-Lennard Struff, Andrey Rublev and Taylor Fritz, but ultimately made it through to his sixth consecutive Tour-level final. He lost there to Jannik Sinner in four sets. This was Alcaraz's first loss in a slam final, and his first loss to Sinner since 2023. This also ended his 24-match win streak, the longest of his career.

Following the tournament, Alcaraz announced his withdrawal from the upcoming Canadian Open, citing a need to rest and recover from "small muscle issues" after many weeks of play. Alcaraz's coach Juan Carlos Ferrero later revealed they spent 15 days of this time on a training block targeted against beating Jannik Sinner.

=== North American hard court swing ===
==== Cincinnati Open ====
Alcaraz returned to competition at the Cincinnati Open. He reached his seventh consecutive Tour-level final after defeating an ailing Alexander Zverev in the semifinals. He then faced Jannik Sinner for their first clash in a big hard court final. Sinner struggled physically, and retired while Alcaraz was leading 5–0 in the first set. Alcaraz therefore claimed his third Masters title of the season, and sixth overall title of the season. With this victory, he became the youngest man to complete the set of big American titles (Indian Wells, Miami, Cincinnati and the US Open), beating the record set by Pete Sampras.

==== US Open ====
Prior to singles competition at the US Open, Alcaraz entered mixed doubles in a partnership with Emma Raducanu which caused a media frenzy due to speculation about their relationship. They lost to top seeds Jack Draper and Jessica Pegula in the first round.

Alcaraz swept through the first six rounds of singles competition, bagelling both Mattia Bellucci and Luciano Darderi on the way. Following his quarterfinal match against Jiri Lehecka, Alcaraz surpassed 10,000 ranking points for the first time in his career. In the semifinal, Alcaraz recorded his first win over Novak Djokovic on hardcourt. Alcaraz reached the final without dropping a single set, the first man to do so at the US Open since Federer in 2015. This was Alcaraz's eighth consecutive Tour-level final, and his third consecutive slam final against Jannik Sinner. Alcaraz defeated defending champion Sinner in four sets to claim his sixth slam. He became the fourth and youngest man in the Open Era to win multiple slam titles on each surface, breaking Mats Wilander's record. He was broken just three times on serve throughout the whole tournament, in one of the most dominant major runs of all time. With this victory, Alcaraz also regained the world No. 1 ranking for the first time in two years. It was the second time (following 2022) that he had seized this ranking by winning a US Open final against an opponent who was also in contention for it.

Following the tournament, Alcaraz announced his withdrawal from the Spanish team for the second round of Davis Cup qualifiers, citing fatigue.

==== Laver Cup ====
Alcaraz returned to America a week later to compete for Team Europe in the Laver Cup for the second time. On Day One, he paired with Jakub Mensik to win a doubles match against Team World's Taylor Fritz and Alex Michelsen. On Day Two, he was defeated by Taylor Fritz in his first singles match as reinstated world No. 1. On Day Three, he paired with Casper Ruud to win a doubles match against Alex Michelsen and Reilly Opelka, and followed this with a victory against Francisco Cerundolo in singles. Team Europe ultimately lost the tournament 9–15, with Alcaraz responsible for 7 of their points.

=== Asian swing ===
==== Japan Open ====
A day later, Alcaraz arrived in Tokyo to prepare for his debut at the Japan Open. In the first set of his first round match against Sebastián Báez, Alcaraz twisted his ankle. He played the rest of the tournament even more aggressively than usual to avoid moving too much on his ankle: during his quarterfinal dismissal of Brandon Nakashima, he hit 38 non-service winners in eighteen games. Despite the injury, Alcaraz ultimately progressed through the draw to reach his ninth consecutive final. He tied Rafael Nadal in third place for the most ATP Tour finals ever reached in a row, behind Novak Djokovic and Roger Federer. He defeated Taylor Fritz in the final to secure his eighth title of the year.

Hours after the final, Alcaraz announced his withdrawal from the Shanghai Open.

=== Indoor hard court season ===
==== Paris Masters ====
Alcaraz kicked off the indoor season at the Paris Masters, historically one of his least successful tournaments. He received a bye into the second round, where he lost to Cameron Norrie in three sets, snapping his streak of nine consecutive finals.

==== ATP Finals ====
Alcaraz then returned to the ATP Finals, for which he had been the first player to qualify after winning his Wimbledon semifinal on July 8. He defeated Alex de Minaur, Taylor Fritz, and Lorenzo Musetti to top his round robin group. With the win against Musetti, he clinched the year-end No. 1 ranking for the second time. Alcaraz defeated Félix Auger-Aliassime in the semifinal, making only three unforced errors in the first set. He progressed to yet another final against Jannik Sinner, which he lost in two tight sets despite holding set point in the first one.

Alcaraz then announced his withdrawal from the Davis Cup due to a hamstring injury sustained during the ATP Finals, ending his season.

== All matches ==
This table chronicles all the matches of Carlos Alcaraz in 2025.

Key
W	F	SF	QF	#R	RR	Q#	P#	DNQ	A	Z#	PO	G	S	B	NMS	NTI	P	NH

(W) winner; (F) finalist; (SF) semifinalist; (QF) quarterfinalist; (#R) rounds 4, 3, 2, 1; (RR) round-robin stage; (Q#) qualification round; (P#) preliminary round; (DNQ) did not qualify; (A) absent; (Z#) Davis/Fed Cup Zonal Group (with number indication) or (PO) play-off; (G) gold, (S) silver or (B) bronze Olympic/Paralympic medal; (NMS) not a Masters tournament; (NTI) not a Tier I tournament; (P) postponed; (NH) not held; (SR) strike rate (events won / competed); (W–L) win–loss record.
To avoid confusion and double counting, these charts are updated at the conclusion of a tournament or when the player's participation has ended.

=== Singles matches ===
Tournament	Match	Round	Opponent (seed or key)	Rank	Result	Score
Australian Open; Melbourne, Australia; Grand Slam tournament Hard, outdoor 12–26 January 2025
Australian Open; Melbourne, Australia; Grand Slam tournament Hard, outdoor 12–26 January 2025	1 / 266	1R	(Kazakhstan) Alexander Shevchenko	77	Win	6–1, 7–5, 6–1
Australian Open; Melbourne, Australia; Grand Slam tournament Hard, outdoor 12–26 January 2025	2 / 267	2R	(Japan) Yoshihito Nishioka	65	Win	6–0, 6–1, 6–4
Australian Open; Melbourne, Australia; Grand Slam tournament Hard, outdoor 12–26 January 2025	3 / 268	3R	(Portugal) Nuno Borges	33	Win	6–2, 6–4, 6–7^{(3–7)}, 6–2
Australian Open; Melbourne, Australia; Grand Slam tournament Hard, outdoor 12–26 January 2025	4 / 269	4R	(United Kingdom) Jack Draper (15)	18	Win	7–5, 6–1, 0–0 (ret.)
Australian Open; Melbourne, Australia; Grand Slam tournament Hard, outdoor 12–26 January 2025	5 / 270	QF	(Serbia) Novak Djokovic (7)	7	Loss	6–4, 4–6, 3–6, 4–6
Rotterdam Open; Rotterdam, Netherlands; ATP 500; Hard, indoor 3–9 February 2025
Rotterdam Open; Rotterdam, Netherlands; ATP 500; Hard, indoor 3–9 February 2025	6 / 271	1R	(Netherlands) Botic van de Zandschulp (WC)	84	Win	7–6^{(7–3)}, 3–6, 6–1
Rotterdam Open; Rotterdam, Netherlands; ATP 500; Hard, indoor 3–9 February 2025	7 / 272	2R	(Italy) Andrea Vavassori (Q)	317	Win	6–2, 6–1
Rotterdam Open; Rotterdam, Netherlands; ATP 500; Hard, indoor 3–9 February 2025	8 / 273	QF	(Spain) Pedro Martínez	44	Win	6–2, 6–1
Rotterdam Open; Rotterdam, Netherlands; ATP 500; Hard, indoor 3–9 February 2025	9 / 274	SF	(Poland) Hubert Hurkacz (8)	21	Win	6–4, 6–7^{(5–7)}, 6–3
Rotterdam Open; Rotterdam, Netherlands; ATP 500; Hard, indoor 3–9 February 2025	10 / 275	W	(Australia) Alex de Minaur (3)	8	Win (1)	6–4, 3–6, 6–2
Qatar Open; Doha, Qatar; ATP 500; Hard, outdoor 17–22 February 2025
Qatar Open; Doha, Qatar; ATP 500; Hard, outdoor 17–22 February 2025	11 / 276	1R	(Croatia) Marin Čilić (PR)	192	Win	6–4, 6–4
Qatar Open; Doha, Qatar; ATP 500; Hard, outdoor 17–22 February 2025	12 / 277	2R	(Italy) Luca Nardi (Q)	85	Win	6–1, 4–6, 6–3
Qatar Open; Doha, Qatar; ATP 500; Hard, outdoor 17–22 February 2025	13 / 278	QF	(Czech Republic) Jiří Lehečka	25	Loss	3–6, 6–3, 4–6
Indian Wells Open; Indian Wells, United States; ATP 1000; Hard, outdoor 5–16 March 2025
Indian Wells Open; Indian Wells, United States; ATP 1000; Hard, outdoor 5–16 March 2025	–	1R	Bye			
Indian Wells Open; Indian Wells, United States; ATP 1000; Hard, outdoor 5–16 March 2025	14 / 279	2R	(France) Quentin Halys	59	Win	6–4, 6–2
Indian Wells Open; Indian Wells, United States; ATP 1000; Hard, outdoor 5–16 March 2025	15 / 280	3R	(Canada) Denis Shapovalov (27)	28	Win	6–2, 6–4
Indian Wells Open; Indian Wells, United States; ATP 1000; Hard, outdoor 5–16 March 2025	16 / 281	4R	(Bulgaria) Grigor Dimitrov (14)	15	Win	6–1, 6–1
Indian Wells Open; Indian Wells, United States; ATP 1000; Hard, outdoor 5–16 March 2025	17 / 282	QF	(Argentina) Francisco Cerúndolo (25)	26	Win	6–3, 7–6^{(7–4)}
Indian Wells Open; Indian Wells, United States; ATP 1000; Hard, outdoor 5–16 March 2025	18 / 283	SF	(United Kingdom) Jack Draper (13)	14	Loss	1–6, 6–0, 4–6
Miami Open; Miami Gardens, United States; ATP 1000; Hard, outdoor 19–30 March 2025
Miami Open; Miami Gardens, United States; ATP 1000; Hard, outdoor 19–30 March 2025	–	1R	Bye			
Miami Open; Miami Gardens, United States; ATP 1000; Hard, outdoor 19–30 March 2025	19 / 284	2R	(Belgium) David Goffin	55	Loss	7–5, 4–6, 3–6
Monte-Carlo Masters; Roquebrune-Cap-Martin, France; ATP 1000; Clay, outdoor 6–13 April 2025
Monte-Carlo Masters; Roquebrune-Cap-Martin, France; ATP 1000; Clay, outdoor 6–13 April 2025	–	1R	Bye			
Monte-Carlo Masters; Roquebrune-Cap-Martin, France; ATP 1000; Clay, outdoor 6–13 April 2025	20 / 285	2R	(Argentina) Francisco Cerúndolo	22	Win	3–6, 6–0, 6–1
Monte-Carlo Masters; Roquebrune-Cap-Martin, France; ATP 1000; Clay, outdoor 6–13 April 2025	21 / 286	3R	(Germany) Daniel Altmaier (Q)	84	Win	6–3, 6–1
Monte-Carlo Masters; Roquebrune-Cap-Martin, France; ATP 1000; Clay, outdoor 6–13 April 2025	22 / 287	QF	(France) Arthur Fils (12)	15	Win	4–6, 7–5, 6–3
Monte-Carlo Masters; Roquebrune-Cap-Martin, France; ATP 1000; Clay, outdoor 6–13 April 2025	23 / 288	SF	(Spain) Alejandro Davidovich Fokina	42	Win	7–6^{(7–2)}, 6–4
Monte-Carlo Masters; Roquebrune-Cap-Martin, France; ATP 1000; Clay, outdoor 6–13 April 2025	24 / 289	W	(Italy) Lorenzo Musetti (13)	16	Win (2)	3–6, 6–1, 6–0
Barcelona Open; Barcelona, Spain; ATP 500; Clay, outdoor 14–20 April 2025
Barcelona Open; Barcelona, Spain; ATP 500; Clay, outdoor 14–20 April 2025	25 / 290	1R	(United States) Ethan Quinn (Q)	126	Win	6–2, 7–6^{(8–6)}
Barcelona Open; Barcelona, Spain; ATP 500; Clay, outdoor 14–20 April 2025	26 / 291	2R	(Serbia) Laslo Djere (Q)	80	Win	6–2, 6–4
Barcelona Open; Barcelona, Spain; ATP 500; Clay, outdoor 14–20 April 2025	27 / 292	QF	(Australia) Alex de Minaur (5)	7	Win	7–5, 6–3
Barcelona Open; Barcelona, Spain; ATP 500; Clay, outdoor 14–20 April 2025	28 / 293	SF	(France) Arthur Fils (7)	14	Win	6–2, 6–4
Barcelona Open; Barcelona, Spain; ATP 500; Clay, outdoor 14–20 April 2025	29 / 294	F	(Denmark) Holger Rune (6)	13	Loss	6–7^{(6–8)}, 2–6
Madrid Open; Madrid, Spain; ATP 1000; Clay, outdoor 23 April – 4 May 2025
Madrid Open; Madrid, Spain; ATP 1000; Clay, outdoor 23 April – 4 May 2025	Withdrew					
Italian Open; Rome, Italy; ATP 1000; Clay, outdoor 7–18 May 2025
Italian Open; Rome, Italy; ATP 1000; Clay, outdoor 7–18 May 2025	–	1R	Bye			
Italian Open; Rome, Italy; ATP 1000; Clay, outdoor 7–18 May 2025	30 / 295	2R	(Serbia) Dušan Lajović (Q)	131	Win	6–3, 6–3
Italian Open; Rome, Italy; ATP 1000; Clay, outdoor 7–18 May 2025	31 / 296	3R	(Serbia) Laslo Djere	64	Win	7–6^{(7–2)}, 6–2
Italian Open; Rome, Italy; ATP 1000; Clay, outdoor 7–18 May 2025	32 / 297	4R	Karen Khachanov (23)	24	Win	6–3, 3–6, 7–5
Italian Open; Rome, Italy; ATP 1000; Clay, outdoor 7–18 May 2025	33 / 298	QF	(United Kingdom) Jack Draper (5)	5	Win	6–4, 6–4
Italian Open; Rome, Italy; ATP 1000; Clay, outdoor 7–18 May 2025	34 / 299	SF	(Italy) Lorenzo Musetti (8)	9	Win	6–3, 7–6^{(7–4)}
Italian Open; Rome, Italy; ATP 1000; Clay, outdoor 7–18 May 2025	35 / 300	W	(Italy) Jannik Sinner (1)	1	Win (3)	7–6^{(7–5)}, 6–1
French Open; Paris, France; Grand Slam tournament Clay, outdoor 25 May – 8 June 2025
French Open; Paris, France; Grand Slam tournament Clay, outdoor 25 May – 8 June 2025	36 / 301	1R	(Italy) Giulio Zeppieri (Q)	310	Win	6–3, 6–4, 6–2
French Open; Paris, France; Grand Slam tournament Clay, outdoor 25 May – 8 June 2025	37 / 302	2R	(Hungary) Fábián Marozsán	56	Win	6–1, 4–6, 6–1, 6–2
French Open; Paris, France; Grand Slam tournament Clay, outdoor 25 May – 8 June 2025	38 / 303	3R	(Bosnia and Herzegovina) Damir Džumhur	69	Win	6–1, 6–3, 4–6, 6–4
French Open; Paris, France; Grand Slam tournament Clay, outdoor 25 May – 8 June 2025	39 / 304	4R	(United States) Ben Shelton (13)	13	Win	7–6^{(10–8)}, 6–3, 4–6, 6–4
French Open; Paris, France; Grand Slam tournament Clay, outdoor 25 May – 8 June 2025	40 / 305	QF	(United States) Tommy Paul (12)	12	Win	6–0, 6–1, 6–4
French Open; Paris, France; Grand Slam tournament Clay, outdoor 25 May – 8 June 2025	41 / 306	SF	(Italy) Lorenzo Musetti (8)	7	Win	4–6, 7–6^{(7–3)}, 6–0, 2–0 (ret.)
French Open; Paris, France; Grand Slam tournament Clay, outdoor 25 May – 8 June 2025	42 / 307	W	(Italy) Jannik Sinner (1)	1	Win (4)	4–6, 6–7^{(4–7)}, 6–4, 7–6^{(7–3)}, 7–6^{(10–2)}
Queen's Club Championships; London, United Kingdom; ATP 500; Grass, outdoor 16–22 June 2025
Queen's Club Championships; London, United Kingdom; ATP 500; Grass, outdoor 16–22 June 2025	43 / 308	1R	(Australia) Adam Walton (LL)	86	Win	6–4, 7–6^{(7–4)}
Queen's Club Championships; London, United Kingdom; ATP 500; Grass, outdoor 16–22 June 2025	44 / 309	2R	(Spain) Jaume Munar	59	Win	6–4, 6–7^{(7–9)}, 7–5
Queen's Club Championships; London, United Kingdom; ATP 500; Grass, outdoor 16–22 June 2025	45 / 310	QF	(France) Arthur Rinderknech (LL)	80	Win	7–5, 6–4
Queen's Club Championships; London, United Kingdom; ATP 500; Grass, outdoor 16–22 June 2025	46 / 311	SF	(Spain) Roberto Bautista Agut	51	Win	6–4, 6–4
Queen's Club Championships; London, United Kingdom; ATP 500; Grass, outdoor 16–22 June 2025	47 / 312	W	(Czech Republic) Jiří Lehečka	30	Win (5)	7–5, 6–7^{(5–7)}, 6–2
Wimbledon; London, United Kingdom; Grand Slam tournament Grass, outdoor 30 June – 13 July 2025
Wimbledon; London, United Kingdom; Grand Slam tournament Grass, outdoor 30 June – 13 July 2025	48 / 313	1R	(Italy) Fabio Fognini	138	Win	7–5, 6–7^{(5–7)}, 7–5, 2–6, 6–1
Wimbledon; London, United Kingdom; Grand Slam tournament Grass, outdoor 30 June – 13 July 2025	49 / 314	2R	(United Kingdom) Oliver Tarvet (Q)	733	Win	6–1, 6–4, 6–4
Wimbledon; London, United Kingdom; Grand Slam tournament Grass, outdoor 30 June – 13 July 2025	50 / 315	3R	(Germany) Jan-Lennard Struff	125	Win	6–1, 3–6, 6–3, 6–4
Wimbledon; London, United Kingdom; Grand Slam tournament Grass, outdoor 30 June – 13 July 2025	51 / 316	4R	Andrey Rublev (14)	14	Win	6–7^{(5–7)}, 6–3, 6–4, 6–4
Wimbledon; London, United Kingdom; Grand Slam tournament Grass, outdoor 30 June – 13 July 2025	52 / 317	QF	(United Kingdom) Cameron Norrie	61	Win	6–2, 6–3, 6–3
Wimbledon; London, United Kingdom; Grand Slam tournament Grass, outdoor 30 June – 13 July 2025	53 / 318	SF	(United States) Taylor Fritz (5)	5	Win	6–4, 5–7, 6–3, 7–6^{(8–6)}
Wimbledon; London, United Kingdom; Grand Slam tournament Grass, outdoor 30 June – 13 July 2025	54 / 319	F	(Italy) Jannik Sinner (1)	1	Loss	6–4, 4–6, 4–6, 4–6
Canadian Open; Toronto, Canada; ATP 1000; Hard, outdoor 27 July – 7 August 2025
Canadian Open; Toronto, Canada; ATP 1000; Hard, outdoor 27 July – 7 August 2025	Withdrew					
Cincinnati Open; Cincinnati, United States; ATP 1000; Hard, outdoor 7–18 August 2025
Cincinnati Open; Cincinnati, United States; ATP 1000; Hard, outdoor 7–18 August 2025	–	1R	Bye			
Cincinnati Open; Cincinnati, United States; ATP 1000; Hard, outdoor 7–18 August 2025	55 / 320	2R	(Bosnia and Herzegovina) Damir Džumhur	56	Win	6–1, 2–6, 6–3
Cincinnati Open; Cincinnati, United States; ATP 1000; Hard, outdoor 7–18 August 2025	56 / 321	3R	(Serbia) Hamad Medjedovic	72	Win	6–4, 6–4
Cincinnati Open; Cincinnati, United States; ATP 1000; Hard, outdoor 7–18 August 2025	57 / 322	4R	(Italy) Luca Nardi (LL)	98	Win	6–1, 6–4
Cincinnati Open; Cincinnati, United States; ATP 1000; Hard, outdoor 7–18 August 2025	58 / 323	QF	Andrey Rublev (9)	11	Win	6–3, 4–6, 7–5
Cincinnati Open; Cincinnati, United States; ATP 1000; Hard, outdoor 7–18 August 2025	59 / 324	SF	(Germany) Alexander Zverev (3)	3	Win	6–4, 6–3
Cincinnati Open; Cincinnati, United States; ATP 1000; Hard, outdoor 7–18 August 2025	60 / 325	W	(Italy) Jannik Sinner (1)	1	Win (6)	5–0 (ret.)
US Open; New York City, United States; Grand Slam tournament Hard, outdoor 24 August – 7 September 2025
US Open; New York City, United States; Grand Slam tournament Hard, outdoor 24 August – 7 September 2025	61 / 326	1R	(United States) Reilly Opelka	67	Win	6–4, 7–5, 6–4
US Open; New York City, United States; Grand Slam tournament Hard, outdoor 24 August – 7 September 2025	62 / 327	2R	(Italy) Mattia Bellucci	65	Win	6–1, 6–0, 6–3
US Open; New York City, United States; Grand Slam tournament Hard, outdoor 24 August – 7 September 2025	63 / 328	3R	(Italy) Luciano Darderi (32)	34	Win	6–2, 6–4, 6–0
US Open; New York City, United States; Grand Slam tournament Hard, outdoor 24 August – 7 September 2025	64 / 329	4R	(France) Arthur Rinderknech	82	Win	7–6^{(7–3)}, 6–3, 6–4
US Open; New York City, United States; Grand Slam tournament Hard, outdoor 24 August – 7 September 2025	65 / 330	QF	(Czech Republic) Jiří Lehečka (20)	21	Win	6–4, 6–2, 6–4
US Open; New York City, United States; Grand Slam tournament Hard, outdoor 24 August – 7 September 2025	66 / 331	SF	(Serbia) Novak Djokovic (7)	7	Win	6–4, 7–6^{(7–4)}, 6–2
US Open; New York City, United States; Grand Slam tournament Hard, outdoor 24 August – 7 September 2025	67 / 332	W	(Italy) Jannik Sinner (1)	1	Win (7)	6–2, 3–6, 6–1, 6–4
Laver Cup; San Francisco, United States; Laver Cup; Hard, indoor 19 – 21 September 2025
Laver Cup; San Francisco, United States; Laver Cup; Hard, indoor 19 – 21 September 2025	68 / 333	Day 2	(United States) Taylor Fritz	5	Loss	3–6, 2–6
Laver Cup; San Francisco, United States; Laver Cup; Hard, indoor 19 – 21 September 2025	69 / 334	Day 3	(Argentina) Francisco Cerúndolo	21	Win	6–2, 6–1
Japan Open; Tokyo, Japan; ATP 500; Hard, outdoor 24 – 30 September 2025
Japan Open; Tokyo, Japan; ATP 500; Hard, outdoor 24 – 30 September 2025	70 / 335	1R	(Argentina) Sebastián Báez	41	Win	6–4, 6–2
Japan Open; Tokyo, Japan; ATP 500; Hard, outdoor 24 – 30 September 2025	71 / 336	2R	(Belgium) Zizou Bergs	45	Win	6–4, 6–3
Japan Open; Tokyo, Japan; ATP 500; Hard, outdoor 24 – 30 September 2025	72 / 337	QF	(United States) Brandon Nakashima	33	Win	6–2, 6–4
Japan Open; Tokyo, Japan; ATP 500; Hard, outdoor 24 – 30 September 2025	73 / 338	SF	(Norway) Casper Ruud (4)	12	Win	3–6, 6–3, 6–4
Japan Open; Tokyo, Japan; ATP 500; Hard, outdoor 24 – 30 September 2025	74 / 339	W	(United States) Taylor Fritz (2)	5	Win (8)	6–4, 6–4
Shanghai Masters; Shanghai, China; ATP 1000; Hard, outdoor 1 – 12 October 2025
Shanghai Masters; Shanghai, China; ATP 1000; Hard, outdoor 1 – 12 October 2025	Withdrew					
Paris Masters; Paris, France; ATP 1000; Hard, indoor 27 October – 2 November 2025
Paris Masters; Paris, France; ATP 1000; Hard, indoor 27 October – 2 November 2025	–	1R	Bye			
Paris Masters; Paris, France; ATP 1000; Hard, indoor 27 October – 2 November 2025	75 / 340	2R	(United Kingdom) Cameron Norrie	31	Loss	6–4, 3–6, 4–6
ATP Finals; Turin, Italy; ATP Finals; Hard, indoor 9 – 16 November 2025
ATP Finals; Turin, Italy; ATP Finals; Hard, indoor 9 – 16 November 2025	76 / 341	RR	(Australia) Alex de Minaur (7)	7	Win	7–6^{(7–5)}, 6–2
ATP Finals; Turin, Italy; ATP Finals; Hard, indoor 9 – 16 November 2025	77 / 342	RR	(United States) Taylor Fritz (6)	6	Win	6–7^{(2–7)}, 7–5, 6–3
ATP Finals; Turin, Italy; ATP Finals; Hard, indoor 9 – 16 November 2025	78 / 343	RR	(Italy) Lorenzo Musetti (9)	9	Win	6–4, 6–1
ATP Finals; Turin, Italy; ATP Finals; Hard, indoor 9 – 16 November 2025	79 / 344	SF	(Canada) Félix Auger-Aliassime (8)	8	Win	6–2, 6–4
ATP Finals; Turin, Italy; ATP Finals; Hard, indoor 9 – 16 November 2025	80 / 345	F	(Italy) Jannik Sinner (2)	2	Loss	6–7^{(4–7)}, 5–7

=== Doubles matches ===
Tournament	Match	Round	Opponents (seed or key)	Ranks	Result	Score
Laver Cup; San Francisco, United States; Laver Cup; Hard, indoor 19 – 21 September 2025; Partner: (Czech Republic) Jakub Menšík (Day 1); (Norway) Casper Ruud (Day 3)
Laver Cup; San Francisco, United States; Laver Cup; Hard, indoor 19 – 21 September 2025; Partner: (Czech Republic) Jakub Menšík (Day 1); (Norway) Casper Ruud (Day 3)	1 / 14	Day 1	(United States) Taylor Fritz / (United States) Alex Michelsen	348 / 108	Win	7–6^{(9–7)}, 6–4
Laver Cup; San Francisco, United States; Laver Cup; Hard, indoor 19 – 21 September 2025; Partner: (Czech Republic) Jakub Menšík (Day 1); (Norway) Casper Ruud (Day 3)	2 / 15	Day 3	(United States) Alex Michelsen / (United States) Reilly Opelka	108 / –	Win	7–6^{(7–4)}, 6–1

=== Mixed doubles matches ===
Tournament	Match	Round	Opponents (seed or key)	Ranks	Result	Score
US Open; New York City, United States; Grand Slam tournament Hard, outdoor 24 August – 7 September 2025; Partner: (United Kingdom) Emma Raducanu
US Open; New York City, United States; Grand Slam tournament Hard, outdoor 24 August – 7 September 2025; Partner: (United Kingdom) Emma Raducanu	1 / 1	1R	(United States) Jessica Pegula / (United Kingdom) Jack Draper (1)	72 / 246	Loss	2–4, 2–4

== Exhibition matches ==
=== Singles ===
Tournament	Match	Round	Opponent (seed or key)	Rank	Result	Score
Australian Open Opening Week; Melbourne, Australia Hard, outdoor 7 – 10 January 2025
Australian Open Opening Week; Melbourne, Australia Hard, outdoor 7 – 10 January 2025	1	PO	(Australia) Alex de Minaur	8	Loss	5–7, 6–4, [5–10]
Australian Open Opening Week; Melbourne, Australia Hard, outdoor 7 – 10 January 2025	2	PO	(Australia) Alexei Popyrin	25	Win	6–3, 7–5
La Batalla de Leyendas; San Juan, Puerto Rico Hard, indoor 2 March 2025
La Batalla de Leyendas; San Juan, Puerto Rico Hard, indoor 2 March 2025	3	PO	(United States) Frances Tiafoe	17	Win	6–4, 3–6, 6–4
6 Kings Slam; Riyadh, Saudi Arabia Hard, outdoor 15 – 18 October 2025
6 Kings Slam; Riyadh, Saudi Arabia Hard, outdoor 15 – 18 October 2025	4	SF	(United States) Taylor Fritz	4	Win	6–4, 6–2
6 Kings Slam; Riyadh, Saudi Arabia Hard, outdoor 15 – 18 October 2025	5	F	(Italy) Jannik Sinner	2	Loss	2–6, 4–6

== Schedule ==
Per Carlos Alcaraz, this is his current 2025 schedule (subject to change).

=== Singles schedule ===
Date	Tournament	Location	Tier	Surface	Prev. result	Prev. points	New points	Result
12 January 2025– 26 January 2025	Australian Open	Melbourne (AUS)	Grand Slam	Hard	QF	400	400	Quarterfinals (lost to Novak Djokovic, 6–4, 4–6, 3–6, 4–6)
3 February 2025– 9 February 2025	Rotterdam Open	Rotterdam (NED)	ATP 500	Hard (i)	A	0	500	Winner (defeated Alex de Minaur, 6–4, 3–6, 6–2)
17 February 2025– 22 February 2025	Qatar Open	Doha (QAT)	ATP 500	Hard	A	0	100	Quarterfinals (lost to Jiří Lehečka, 3–6, 6–3, 4–6)
5 March 2025– 16 March 2025	Indian Wells Open	Indian Wells (USA)	ATP 1000	Hard	W	1000	400	Semifinals (lost to Jack Draper, 1–6, 6–0, 4–6)
19 March 2025– 30 March 2025	Miami Open	Miami (USA)	ATP 1000	Hard	QF	200	10	Second round (lost to David Goffin, 7–5, 4–6, 3–6)
6 April 2025– 13 April 2025	Monte-Carlo Masters	Roquebrune-Cap-Martin (FRA)	ATP 1000	Clay	A	0	1000	Winner (defeated Lorenzo Musetti, 3–6, 6–1, 6–0)
14 April 2025– 20 April 2025	Barcelona Open	Barcelona (ESP)	ATP 500	Clay	A	0	330	Final (lost to Holger Rune, 6–7^{(6–8)}, 2–6)
23 April 2025– 4 May 2025	Madrid Open	Madrid (ESP)	ATP 1000	Clay	QF	200	0	Withdrew
7 May 2025– 18 May 2025	Italian Open	Rome (ITA)	ATP 1000	Clay	A	0	1000	Winner (defeated Jannik Sinner, 7–6^{(7–5)}, 6–1)
25 May 2025– 8 June 2025	French Open	Paris (FRA)	Grand Slam	Clay	W	2000	2000	Winner (defeated Jannik Sinner, 4–6, 6–7^{(4–7)}, 6–4, 7–6^{(7–3)}, 7–6^{(10–2)})
16 June 2025– 22 June 2025	Queen's Club Championships	London (GBR)	ATP 500	Grass	2R	50	500	Winner (defeated Jiří Lehečka, 7–5, 6–7^{(5–7)}, 6–2)
30 June 2025– 13 July 2025	Wimbledon	London (GBR)	Grand Slam	Grass	W	2000	1300	Final (lost to Jannik Sinner, 6–4, 4–6, 4–6, 4–6)
27 July 2025– 7 August 2025	Canadian Open	Toronto (CAN)	ATP 1000	Hard	A	0	0	Withdrew
7 August 2025– 18 August 2025	Cincinnati Open	Cincinnati (USA)	ATP 1000	Hard	2R	10	1000	Winner (defeated Jannik Sinner, 5–0 ret.)
24 August 2025– 7 September 2025	US Open	New York (USA)	Grand Slam	Hard	2R	50	2000	Winner (defeated Jannik Sinner, 6–2, 3–6, 6–1, 6–4)
12 September 2025– 14 September 2025	Davis Cup Qualifiers	Marbella (ESP)	Davis Cup	Clay	N/A	N/A	N/A	Withdrew
19 September 2025– 21 September 2025	Laver Cup	San Francisco (USA)	Laver Cup	Hard (i)	N/A	N/A	N/A	Lost to Team World, 9–15
24 September 2025– 30 September 2025	Japan Open	Tokyo (JPN)	ATP 500	Hard	A	0	500	Winner (defeated Taylor Fritz, 6–4, 6–4)
1 October 2025– 12 October 2025	Shanghai Masters	Shanghai (CHN)	ATP 1000	Hard	QF	200	0	Withdrew
27 October 2025– 2 November 2025	Paris Masters	Paris (FRA)	ATP 1000	Hard (i)	3R	100	10	Second round (lost to Cameron Norrie, 6–4, 3–6, 4–6)
9 November 2025– 16 November 2025	ATP Finals	Turin (ITA)	Tour Finals	Hard (i)	RR	200	1000	Final (lost to Jannik Sinner, 6–7^{(4–7)}, 5–7)
18 November 2025– 23 November 2025	Davis Cup Finals	Málaga (ESP)	Davis Cup	Hard (i)	N/A	N/A	N/A	Withdrew
Total year-end points (as of ATP Finals)						7010	12050	
Total year-end points						7010	12050	▲5040 difference
Source: Rankings breakdown

== Yearly records ==
=== Head-to-head matchups ===
Carlos Alcaraz has a 71–9 (88.75%) ATP match win–loss record in the 2025 season. His record against players ranked in the ATP rankings Top 10 at the time of the meeting is 17–4 (80.95%) . Bold indicates player was ranked top 10 at the time of at least one meeting. The following list is ordered by number of wins:

- **(Italy) Lorenzo Musetti** 4–0
- **(Italy) Jannik Sinner** 4–2
- **(Australia) Alex de Minaur** 3–0
- (Argentina) Francisco Cerúndolo 3–0
- **(United States) Taylor Fritz** 3–1
- (Serbia) Laslo Djere 2–0
- (Bosnia and Herzegovina) Damir Džumhur 2–0
- (France) Arthur Fils 2–0
- (Italy) Luca Nardi 2–0
- (France) Arthur Rinderknech 2–0
- Andrey Rublev 2–0
- **(United Kingdom) Jack Draper** 2–1
- (Czech Republic) Jiří Lehečka 2–1
- (Germany) Daniel Altmaier 1–0
- **(Canada) Félix Auger-Aliassime** 1–0
- (Argentina) Sebastián Báez 1–0
- (Spain) Roberto Bautista Agut 1–0
- (Italy) Mattia Bellucci 1–0
- (Belgium) Zizou Bergs 1–0
- (Portugal) Nuno Borges 1–0
- (Croatia) Marin Čilić 1–0
- (Italy) Luciano Darderi 1–0
- (Spain) Alejandro Davidovich Fokina 1–0
- (Bulgaria) Grigor Dimitrov 1–0
- (Italy) Fabio Fognini 1–0
- (France) Quentin Halys 1–0
- (Poland) Hubert Hurkacz 1–0
- Karen Khachanov 1–0
- (Serbia) Dušan Lajović 1–0
- (Hungary) Fábián Marozsán 1–0
- (Spain) Pedro Martínez 1–0
- (Serbia) Hamad Medjedovic 1–0
- (Spain) Jaume Munar 1–0
- (United States) Brandon Nakashima 1–0
- (Japan) Yoshihito Nishioka 1–0
- (United States) Reilly Opelka 1–0
- (United States) Tommy Paul 1–0
- (United States) Ethan Quinn 1–0
- (Norway) Casper Ruud 1–0
- (Canada) Denis Shapovalov 1–0
- (United States) Ben Shelton 1–0
- (Kazakhstan) Alexander Shevchenko 1–0
- (Germany) Jan-Lennard Struff 1–0
- (United Kingdom) Oliver Tarvet 1–0
- (Netherlands) Botic van de Zandschulp 1–0
- (Italy) Andrea Vavassori 1–0
- (Australia) Adam Walton 1–0
- (Italy) Giulio Zeppieri 1–0
- **(Germany) Alexander Zverev** 1–0
- **(Serbia) Novak Djokovic** 1–1
- (United Kingdom) Cameron Norrie 1–1
- (Belgium) David Goffin 0–1
- (Denmark) Holger Rune 0–1

* Statistics correct as of 16 November 2025.

=== Top 10 record (17–4) ===
Category Grand Slam (5–2) ATP Finals (4–1) Laver Cup (0–1) Masters 1000 (5–0) 500 Series (3–0) 250 Series (0–0)	Wins by surface Hard (10–3) Clay (6–0) Grass (1–1)	Wins by setting Outdoor (12–2) Indoor (5–2)

Result	W–L	Player	Rk	Event	Surface	Rd	Score	Rk	Ref
Loss	0–1	(Serbia) Novak Djokovic	7	Australian Open, Australia	Hard	QF	6–4, 4–6, 3–6, 4–6	3	
Win	1–1	(Australia) Alex de Minaur	8	Rotterdam Open, Netherlands	Hard (i)	F	6–4, 3–6, 6–2	3	
Win	2–1	(Australia) Alex de Minaur	7	Barcelona Open, Spain	Clay	QF	7–5, 6–3	2	
Win	3–1	(United Kingdom) Jack Draper	5	Italian Open, Italy	Clay	QF	6–4, 6–4	3	
Win	4–1	(Italy) Lorenzo Musetti	9	Italian Open, Italy	Clay	SF	6–3, 7–6^{(7–4)}	3	
Win	5–1	(Italy) Jannik Sinner	**1**	Italian Open, Italy	Clay	F	7–6^{(7–5)}, 6–1	3	
Win	6–1	(Italy) Lorenzo Musetti	7	French Open, France	Clay	SF	4–6, 7–6^{(7–3)}, 6–0, 2–0 ret.	2	
Win	7–1	(Italy) Jannik Sinner	**1**	French Open, France	Clay	F	4–6, 6–7^{(4–7)}, 6–4, 7–6^{(7–3)}, 7–6^{(10–2)}	2	
Win	8–1	(United States) Taylor Fritz	5	Wimbledon, United Kingdom	Grass	SF	6–4, 5–7, 6–3, 7–6^{(8–6)}	2	
Loss	8–2	(Italy) Jannik Sinner	**1**	Wimbledon, United Kingdom	Grass	F	6–4, 4–6, 4–6, 4–6	2	
Win	9–2	(Germany) Alexander Zverev	3	Cincinnati Open, United States	Hard	SF	6–4, 6–3	2	
Win	10–2	(Italy) Jannik Sinner	**1**	Cincinnati Open, United States	Hard	F	5–0 ret.	2	
Win	11–2	(Serbia) Novak Djokovic	7	US Open, United States	Hard	SF	6–4, 7–6^{(7–4)}, 6–2	2	
Win	12–2	(Italy) Jannik Sinner	**1**	US Open, United States	Hard	F	6–2, 3–6, 6–1, 6–4	2	
Loss	12–3	(United States) Taylor Fritz	5	Laver Cup, United States	Hard (i)	RR	3–6, 2–6	**1**	
Win	13–3	(United States) Taylor Fritz	5	Japan Open, Japan	Hard	F	6–4, 6–4	**1**	
Win	14–3	(Australia) Alex de Minaur	7	ATP Finals, Italy	Hard (i)	RR	7–6^{(7–5)}, 6–2	2	
Win	15–3	(United States) Taylor Fritz	6	ATP Finals, Italy	Hard (i)	RR	6–7^{(2–7)}, 7–5, 6–3	**1**	
Win	16–3	(Italy) Lorenzo Musetti	9	ATP Finals, Italy	Hard (i)	RR	6–4, 6–1	**1**	
Win	17–3	(Canada) Félix Auger-Aliassime	8	ATP Finals, Italy	Hard (i)	SF	6–2, 6–4	**1**	
Loss	17–4	(Italy) Jannik Sinner	2	ATP Finals, Italy	Hard (i)	F	6–7^{(4–7)}, 5–7	**1**	

- Key: (Rk) first use, opponent rank; (Rd) round; (Rk) 2nd use, player rank; (Ref) reference; (F) final; (SF) semifinal; (QF) quarterfinal; (#R) rounds 4, 3, 2, 1; (RR) round-robin stage; (Q#) qualifying rounds or stages (3), 2, 1.

=== Finals ===
==== Singles: 11 (8 titles, 3 runner-ups) ====
Category Grand Slam (2–1) ATP Finals (0–1) ATP 1000 (3–0) ATP 500 (3–1) ATP 250 (0–0)	Titles by surface Hard (4–1) Clay (3–1) Grass (1–1)	Titles by setting Outdoor (7–2) Indoor (1–1)

Result	W–L	Date	Tournament	Tier	Surface	Opponent	Score
Win	1–0	Feb 2025	Rotterdam Open, Netherlands	ATP 500	Hard (i)	(Australia) Alex de Minaur	6–4, 3–6, 6–2
Win	2–0	Apr 2025	Monte-Carlo Masters, France	ATP 1000	Clay	(Italy) Lorenzo Musetti	3–6, 6–1, 6–0
Loss	2–1	Apr 2025	Barcelona Open, Spain	ATP 500	Clay	(Denmark) Holger Rune	6–7^{(6–8)}, 2–6
Win	3–1	May 2025	Italian Open, Italy	ATP 1000	Clay	(Italy) Jannik Sinner	7–6^{(7–5)}, 6–1
Win	4–1	Jun 2025	French Open, France	Grand Slam	Clay	(Italy) Jannik Sinner	4–6, 6–7^{(4–7)}, 6–4, 7–6^{(7–3)}, 7–6^{(10–2)}
Win	5–1	Jun 2025	Queen's Club, United Kingdom	ATP 500	Grass	(Czech Republic) Jiří Lehečka	7–5, 6–7^{(5–7)}, 6–2
Loss	5–2	Jul 2025	Wimbledon, United Kingdom	Grand Slam	Grass	(Italy) Jannik Sinner	6–4, 4–6, 4–6, 4–6
Win	6–2	Aug 2025	Cincinnati Open, United States	ATP 1000	Hard	(Italy) Jannik Sinner	5–0 ret.
Win	7–2	Sep 2025	US Open, United States	Grand Slam	Hard	(Italy) Jannik Sinner	6–2, 3–6, 6–1, 6–4
Win	8–2	Sep 2025	Japan Open, Japan	ATP 500	Hard	(United States) Taylor Fritz	6–4, 6–4
Loss	8–3	Nov 2025	ATP Finals, Italy	ATP Finals	Hard (i)	(Italy) Jannik Sinner	6–7^{(4–7)}, 5–7

=== Earnings ===
- **Bold** font denotes tournament win

**Singles**
Event	Prize money	Year-to-date
Australian Open	A$665,000	$408,576
**Rotterdam Open**	**€449,160**	$873,411
Qatar Open	$75,615	$949,026
Indian Wells Open	$354,850	$1,303,876
Miami Open	$35,260	$1,339,136
**Monte-Carlo Masters**	**€946,610**	$2,376,810
Barcelona Open	€285,435	$2,700,922
**Italian Open**	**€963,225**	$3,980,081
**French Open**	**€2,550,000**	$6,877,646
**Queen's Club Championships**	**€471,755**	$7,422,288
Wimbledon Championships	£1,520,000	$9,507,272
**Cincinnati Open**	**$1,124,380**	$10,631,652
**US Open**	**$5,000,000**	$15,631,652
**Japan Open**	**$416,365**	$16,048,017
Paris Masters	€44,220	$16,099,427
ATP Finals	$2,704,000	$18,803,427
Bonus Pool ATP Ranking #1:	$1,216,854	$20,020,281
Bonus Pool ATP Ranking #1:	$1,334,497	$21,354,778
		$21,354,778
**Total**
		**$21,354,778**

Figures in United States dollars (USD) unless noted.

- source：2025 Singles Activity
- source：2025 Doubles Activity

== See also ==
- 2025 ATP Tour
- 2025 Novak Djokovic tennis season
- 2025 Jannik Sinner tennis season
