= 2025 Japan Open Tennis Championships – Doubles =

Doubles
- 2025 Japan Open Tennis Championships

Final
- Champions: (Monaco) Hugo Nys (France) Édouard Roger-Vasselin
- Runners-up: (India) Rohan Bopanna (Japan) Takeru Yuzuki
- Score: 7–5, 7–5

Events
Singles	Doubles
- Japan Open

Hugo Nys and Édouard Roger-Vasselin defeated Rohan Bopanna and Takeru Yuzuki in the final, 7–5, 7–5 to win the doubles title at the 2025 Japan Open. Aged 45, Bopanna was the second-oldest tour-level men's doubles finalist in the Open Era after John McEnroe (won San Jose in 2006, aged 47).

Julian Cash and Lloyd Glasspool were the reigning champions, but chose to compete in Beijing instead.

== Seeds ==
1. (United States) Christian Harrison / (United States) Evan King (semifinals)
2. (Monaco) Hugo Nys / (France) Édouard Roger-Vasselin (champions)
3. (Argentina) Máximo González / (Argentina) Andrés Molteni (quarterfinals)
4. (Netherlands) Sander Arends / (United Kingdom) Luke Johnson (first round)

== Draw ==
Key

- Q = Qualifier
- WC = Wild card
- LL = Lucky loser
- Alt = Alternate
- ITF = ITF entry
- PR = Protected ranking
- SR = Special ranking
- SE = Special exempt
- JE = Junior exempt
- JR = Junior Accelerator Programme entrant
- CO = College Accelerator Programme entrant
- NG = Next Gen Accelerator Program entrant
- w/o = Walkover
- r = Retired
- d = Defaulted

=== Draw ===
First round
1	(United States) C Harrison (United States) E King	7^{7}	6
Q	(Brazil) F Romboli (Poland) J Zieliński	6^{5}	4
WC	(Japan) K Uesugi (Japan) S Watanabe	6	6
(United States) A Krajicek (Croatia) N Mektić	4	2
3	(Argentina) M González (Argentina) A Molteni	6	6^{5}	[10]
(Czech Republic) T Macháč (Australia) J Peers	3	7^{7}	[8]
(Norway) C Ruud (Australia) J Thompson	3	4
WC	(India) R Bopanna (Japan) T Yuzuki	6	6
(Mexico) S González (Netherlands) D Pel	7^{7}	6
(Portugal) F Cabral (Austria) L Miedler	6^{5}	4
(Austria) A Erler (United States) R Galloway	4	6	[12]
4	(Netherlands) S Arends (United Kingdom) L Johnson	6	3	[10]
(Canada) G Diallo (United States) A Michelsen	2	6	[5]
(United States) B Nakashima (United States) F Tiafoe	6	4	[10]
(United States) R Cash (United States) JJ Tracy	6^{7}	6	[7]
2	(Monaco) H Nys (France) É Roger-Vasselin	7^{9}	4	[10]

Quarterfinals
1	(United States) C Harrison (United States) E King	3	6	[10]
WC	(Japan) K Uesugi (Japan) S Watanabe	6	4	[2]
3	(Argentina) M González (Argentina) A Molteni	6^{5}	6^{4}
WC	(India) R Bopanna (Japan) T Yuzuki	7^{7}	7^{7}
(Mexico) S González (Netherlands) D Pel	7^{7}	6^{5}	[10]
(Austria) A Erler (United States) R Galloway	6^{4}	7^{7}	[12]
(United States) B Nakashima (United States) F Tiafoe
2	(Monaco) H Nys (France) É Roger-Vasselin	w/o

Semifinals
1	(United States) C Harrison (United States) E King	6	3	[16]
WC	(India) R Bopanna (Japan) T Yuzuki	4	6	[18]
(Austria) A Erler (United States) R Galloway	6^{6}	6^{6}
2	(Monaco) H Nys (France) É Roger-Vasselin	7^{8}	7^{8}

Final
WC	(India) R Bopanna (Japan) T Yuzuki	5	5
2	(Monaco) H Nys (France) É Roger-Vasselin	7	7

== Qualifying ==
=== Seeds ===
1. (Brazil) Fernando Romboli / (Poland) Jan Zieliński (qualified)
2. (Portugal) Nuno Borges / (Brazil) Rafael Matos (qualifying competition)

=== Qualifiers ===
1. (Brazil) Fernando Romboli / (Poland) Jan Zieliński

=== Qualifying draw ===
First round
1	(Brazil) Fernando Romboli (Poland) Jan Zieliński	6	6
(Uruguay) Ariel Behar (Italy) Luciano Darderi	3	3
WC	(Japan) Shintaro Mochizuki (Japan) Rei Sakamoto	6^{1}	7^{7}	[8]
2	(Portugal) Nuno Borges (Brazil) Rafael Matos	7^{7}	6^{5}	[10]

Qualifying competition
1	(Brazil) Fernando Romboli (Poland) Jan Zieliński	6	6^{7}	[10]
2	(Portugal) Nuno Borges (Brazil) Rafael Matos	3	7^{9}	[2]
