= 2025 Japan Open Tennis Championships =

- Date: 24–30 September
- Edition: 51st
- Category: ATP 500
- Draw: 32S/16D
- Surface: Hard / outdoor
- Location: Tokyo, Japan
- Venue: Ariake Coliseum

Champions

Singles
- (Spain) Carlos Alcaraz

Doubles
- (Monaco) Hugo Nys / (France) Édouard Roger-Vasselin
- Japan Open

The 2025 Kinoshita Group Japan Open was a men's tennis tournament played on outdoor hardcourts. It was the 51st edition of the Japan Open, and an ATP 500 tournament on the 2025 ATP Tour. It was held at the Ariake Coliseum in Tokyo, Japan, from 24 to 30 September 2025.

== Champions ==
=== Singles ===
- (Spain) Carlos Alcaraz def. (United States) Taylor Fritz, 6–4, 6–4

=== Doubles ===
- (Monaco) Hugo Nys / (France) Édouard Roger-Vasselin def. (India) Rohan Bopanna / (Japan) Takeru Yuzuki, 7–5, 7–5

== Singles main-draw entrants ==
=== Seeds ===
Country	Player	Rank^{1}	Seed
ESP	Carlos Alcaraz	1	1
USA	Taylor Fritz	5	2
DEN	Holger Rune	11	3
NOR	Casper Ruud	12	4
CZE	Tomáš Macháč	22	5
FRA	Ugo Humbert	24	6
CAN	Denis Shapovalov	26	7
USA	Frances Tiafoe	29	8

- ^{1} Rankings are as of 15 September 2025.

=== Other entrants ===
The following players received wildcards into the singles main draw:

- (Japan) Shintaro Mochizuki
- (Japan) Yoshihito Nishioka
- (Japan) Yosuke Watanuki

The following player received entry using a protected ranking:

- (United States) Jenson Brooksby

The following players received entry from the qualifying draw:

- (Hungary) Márton Fucsovics
- (United States) Ethan Quinn
- (Japan) Sho Shimabukuro
- (Australia) Aleksandar Vukic

=== Withdrawals ===
- (United Kingdom) Jack Draper → replaced by (United States) Marcos Giron
- (Czech Republic) Jiří Lehečka → replaced by (Germany) Daniel Altmaier
- (Australia) Alexei Popyrin → replaced by (United States) Jenson Brooksby
- (United States) Ben Shelton → replaced by (Serbia) Hamad Medjedovic

== Doubles main-draw entrants ==
=== Seeds ===
Country	Player	Country	Player	Rank^{1}	Seed
USA	Christian Harrison	USA	Evan King	33	1
MON	Hugo Nys	FRA	Édouard Roger-Vasselin	38	2
ARG	Máximo González	ARG	Andrés Molteni	45	3
NED	Sander Arends	GBR	Luke Johnson	54	4

- Rankings are as of 15 September 2025.

=== Other entrants ===
The following pairs received wildcards into the doubles main draw:

- (India) Rohan Bopanna / (Japan) Takeru Yuzuki
- (Japan) Kaito Uesugi / (Japan) Seita Watanabe

The following pair received entry from the qualifying draw:

- (Brazil) Fernando Romboli / (Poland) Jan Zieliński
