= 2023 Barcelona Open Banc Sabadell – Singles =

Singles
- 2023 Barcelona Open Banc Sabadell

Final
- Champion: (Spain) Carlos Alcaraz
- Runner-up: (Greece) Stefanos Tsitsipas
- Score: 6–3, 6–4

Details
- Draw: 48 (6 Q / 4 WC )
- Seeds: 16

Events
Singles	Doubles
- Barcelona Open

Defending champion Carlos Alcaraz defeated Stefanos Tsitsipas in the final, 6–3, 6–4 to win the singles tennis title at the 2023 Barcelona Open. He did not lose a set during the tournament. Alcaraz was the second Spaniard, after Rafael Nadal, to successfully defend the Barcelona Open title.

== Seeds ==
All seeds receive a bye into the second round.

1. (Spain) Carlos Alcaraz (champion)
2. (Greece) Stefanos Tsitsipas (final)
3. (Norway) Casper Ruud (third round)
4. (Italy) Jannik Sinner (quarterfinals, withdrew)
5. (United States) Frances Tiafoe (second round)
6. Karen Khachanov (third round)
7. (United Kingdom) Cameron Norrie (third round)
8. (Australia) Alex de Minaur (quarterfinals)

9. (Italy) Lorenzo Musetti (semifinals)
10. (Spain) Alejandro Davidovich Fokina (quarterfinals)
11. (Bulgaria) Grigor Dimitrov (third round, withdrew)
12. (United Kingdom) Dan Evans (semifinals)
13. (Spain) Roberto Bautista Agut (third round)
14. (Canada) Denis Shapovalov (third round)
15. (Argentina) Francisco Cerúndolo (quarterfinals)
16. (Japan) Yoshihito Nishioka (third round)

Click on the seed number of a player to go to their draw section.

== Draw ==
Key

- Q = Qualifier
- WC = Wild card
- LL = Lucky loser
- Alt = Alternate
- ITF = ITF entry
- PR = Protected ranking
- SR = Special ranking
- SE = Special exempt
- JE = Junior exempt
- JR = Junior Accelerator Programme entrant
- CO = College Accelerator Programme entrant
- NG = Next Gen Accelerator Program entrant
- w/o = Walkover
- r = Retired
- d = Defaulted

=== Finals ===
Quarterfinals
1	(Spain) Carlos Alcaraz	7^{7}	6
10	(Spain) Alejandro Davidovich Fokina	6^{5}	4
15	(Argentina) Francisco Cerúndolo	6	5	3
12	(United Kingdom) Dan Evans	2	7	6
9	(Italy) Lorenzo Musetti	w/o
4	(Italy) Jannik Sinner
8	(Australia) Alex de Minaur	4	2
2	(Greece) Stefanos Tsitsipas	6	6

Semifinals
1	(Spain) Carlos Alcaraz	6	6
12	(United Kingdom) Dan Evans	2	2
9	(Italy) Lorenzo Musetti	4	7	3
2	(Greece) Stefanos Tsitsipas	6	5	6

Final
1	(Spain) Carlos Alcaraz	6	6
2	(Greece) Stefanos Tsitsipas	3	4

=== Top half ===
==== Section 1 ====
First round
I Ivashka	2	3
(Portugal) N Borges	6	6
(Spain) B Zapata Miralles	6	6
PR	(Hungary) A Balázs	2	2
(Argentina) TM Etcheverry	6	7
WC	(Spain) P Andújar	2	5
(Kazakhstan) A Bublik	0	3
(Finland) E Ruusuvuori	6	6

Second round
1	(Spain) C Alcaraz	6	6
(Portugal) N Borges	3	1
(Spain) B Zapata Miralles	2	2
13	(Spain) R Bautista Agut	6	6
10	(Spain) A Davidovich Fokina	6	6
(Argentina) TM Etcheverry	3	3
(Finland) E Ruusuvuori	6	6^{3}	6
5	(United States) F Tiafoe	4	7^{7}	4

Third round
1	(Spain) C Alcaraz	6	7
13	(Spain) R Bautista Agut	3	5
10	(Spain) A Davidovich Fokina	6	7
(Finland) E Ruusuvuori	4	5

Quarterfinals
1	(Spain) C Alcaraz	7^{7}	6
10	(Spain) A Davidovich Fokina	6^{5}	4

==== Section 2 ====
First round
(United States) M McDonald	5	4
(United States) B Shelton	7	6
(Italy) F Passaro	6	6
WC	(Spain) F Verdasco	1	1
Q	(Italy) M Arnaldi	6	6
(Spain) J Munar	3	4
Q	(Argentina) M Trungelliti	5	3
(Chile) N Jarry	7	6

Second round
3	(Norway) C Ruud	6	7^{7}
(United States) B Shelton	2	6^{1}
(Italy) F Passaro	2	2
15	(Argentina) F Cerúndolo	6	6
12	(United Kingdom) D Evans	6	6
Q	(Italy) M Arnaldi	4	3
(Chile) N Jarry	4	4
6	K Khachanov	6	6

Third round
3	(Norway) C Ruud	6^{5}	3
15	(Argentina) F Cerúndolo	7^{7}	6
12	(United Kingdom) D Evans	6	6
6	K Khachanov	3	4

Quarterfinals
15	(Argentina) F Cerúndolo	6	5	3
12	(United Kingdom) D Evans	2	7	6

=== Bottom half ===
==== Section 3 ====
First round
Q	P Kotov	6^{5}	6	6
Q	(Ukraine) O Krutykh	7^{7}	4	1
WC	(Spain) D Rincón	4	3
(Australia) J Kubler	6	6
(Belgium) D Goffin	7^{7}	6^{4}	6
WC	(Spain) F López	6^{3}	7^{7}	0
(Argentina) D Schwartzman	6	6
(China) Y Wu	2	2

Second round
7	(United Kingdom) C Norrie	6	6
Q	P Kotov	1	2
(Australia) J Kubler	3	1
9	(Italy) L Musetti	6	6
16	(Japan) Y Nishioka	6	7
(Belgium) D Goffin	1	5
(Argentina) D Schwartzman	2	4
4	(Italy) J Sinner	6	6

Third round
7	(United Kingdom) C Norrie	6	4	1
9	(Italy) L Musetti	3	6	6
16	(Japan) Y Nishioka	1	6	3
4	(Italy) J Sinner	6	4	6

Quarterfinals
9	(Italy) L Musetti	w/o
4	(Italy) J Sinner

==== Section 4 ====
First round
Q	(Italy) L Giustino	2	2
A Shevchenko	6	6
(Spain) A Ramos Viñolas	3	6	4
(Ecuador) E Gómez	6	1	6
(Spain) P Martínez	5	6	5
Q	(Slovakia) J Kovalík	7	2	7
(Argentina) P Cachin	6	7
(Netherlands) G Brouwer	3	5

Second round
8	(Australia) A de Minaur	6	6
A Shevchenko	0	1
(Ecuador) E Gómez	3	1
11	(Bulgaria) G Dimitrov	6	6
14	(Canada) D Shapovalov	6	6
Q	(Slovakia) J Kovalík	4	3
(Argentina) P Cachin	4	2
2	(Greece) S Tsitsipas	6	6

Third round
8	(Australia) A de Minaur	w/o
11	(Bulgaria) G Dimitrov
14	(Canada) D Shapovalov	3	2
2	(Greece) S Tsitsipas	6	6

Quarterfinals
8	(Australia) A de Minaur	4	2
2	(Greece) S Tsitsipas	6	6

== Qualifying ==
=== Seeds ===
1. (Italy) Matteo Arnaldi (qualified)
2. Pavel Kotov (qualified)
3. (Finland) Otto Virtanen (first round)
4. (Italy) Giulio Zeppieri (first round)
5. (France) Hugo Grenier (qualifying competition)
6. (Italy) Raúl Brancaccio (first round)
7. (Germany) Maximilian Marterer (first round)
8. (Kazakhstan) Timofey Skatov (qualifying competition)
9. (Slovakia) Jozef Kovalík (qualified)
10. (France) Benoît Paire (qualifying competition)
11. (France) Geoffrey Blancaneaux (qualifying competition)
12. (Ukraine) Oleksii Krutykh (qualified)

=== Qualifiers ===
1. (Italy) Matteo Arnaldi
2. Pavel Kotov
3. (Italy) Lorenzo Giustino
4. (Argentina) Marco Trungelliti
5. (Ukraine) Oleksii Krutykh
6. (Slovakia) Jozef Kovalík

=== Draw ===
==== First qualifier ====
First round
1	(Italy) Matteo Arnaldi	7	6
(United States) Nicolas Moreno de Alboran	5	3
(Belgium) Michael Geerts	0	4
8	(Kazakhstan) Timofey Skatov	6	6

Qualifying competition
1	(Italy) Matteo Arnaldi	7^{7}	7
8	(Kazakhstan) Timofey Skatov	6^{1}	5

==== Second qualifier ====
First round
2	Pavel Kotov	3	7^{7}	6
(Italy) Matteo Gigante	6	6^{3}	4
(Spain) Oriol Roca Batalla	4	4
10	(France) Benoît Paire	6	6

Qualifying competition
2	Pavel Kotov	6	2	6
10	(France) Benoît Paire	2	6	3

==== Third qualifier ====
First round
3	(Finland) Otto Virtanen	7^{7}	4	4
(Italy) Lorenzo Giustino	6^{1}	6	6
WC	(Spain) Max Alcalá Gurri	6	4	3
11	(France) Geoffrey Blancaneaux	3	6	6

Qualifying competition
(Italy) Lorenzo Giustino	6	1	7^{7}
11	(France) Geoffrey Blancaneaux	3	6	6^{1}

==== Fourth qualifier ====
First round
4	(Italy) Giulio Zeppieri	5	4
WC	(Spain) Àlex Martí Pujolràs	7	6
(Argentina) Marco Trungelliti	6	6
7	(Germany) Maximilian Marterer	2	1

Qualifying competition
WC	(Spain) Àlex Martí Pujolràs	7^{7}	2	4
(Argentina) Marco Trungelliti	6^{4}	6	6

==== Fifth qualifier ====
First round
5	(France) Hugo Grenier	7^{7}	2	6
WC	(Spain) Martín Landaluce	6^{2}	6	2
(Serbia) Miljan Zekić	4	6	1
12	(Ukraine) Oleksii Krutykh	6	4	6

Qualifying competition
5	(France) Hugo Grenier	4	4
12	(Ukraine) Oleksii Krutykh	6	6

==== Sixth qualifier ====
First round
6	(Italy) Raúl Brancaccio	3	5
WC	(Spain) Pol Martín Tiffon	6	7
(Czech Republic) Marek Gengel	3	2
9	(Slovakia) Jozef Kovalík	6	6

Qualifying competition
WC	(Spain) Pol Martín Tiffon	3	7	2
9	(Slovakia) Jozef Kovalík	6	5	6
