= 2025 Japan Open Tennis Championships – Singles =

Singles
- 2025 Japan Open Tennis Championships

Final
- Champion: (Spain) Carlos Alcaraz
- Runner-up: (United States) Taylor Fritz
- Score: 6–4, 6–4

Details
- Draw: 32 (4Q / 3WC)
- Seeds: 8

Events
Singles	Doubles
- Japan Open

Carlos Alcaraz defeated Taylor Fritz in the final, 6–4, 6–4 to win the singles tennis title at the 2025 Japan Open. It was his 24th career ATP Tour title.

Arthur Fils was the reigning champion, but did not participate this year due to a back injury.

== Seeds ==
1. (Spain) Carlos Alcaraz (champion)
2. (United States) Taylor Fritz (final)
3. (Denmark) Holger Rune (quarterfinals)
4. (Norway) Casper Ruud (semifinals)
5. (Czech Republic) Tomáš Macháč (first round)
6. (France) Ugo Humbert (first round)
7. (Canada) Denis Shapovalov (first round)
8. (United States) Frances Tiafoe (first round)

== Draw ==
Key

- Q = Qualifier
- WC = Wild card
- LL = Lucky loser
- Alt = Alternate
- ITF = ITF entry
- PR = Protected ranking
- SR = Special ranking
- SE = Special exempt
- JE = Junior exempt
- JR = Junior Accelerator Programme entrant
- CO = College Accelerator Programme entrant
- NG = Next Gen Accelerator Program entrant
- w/o = Walkover
- r = Retired
- d = Defaulted

=== Finals ===
Semifinals
1	(Spain) Carlos Alcaraz	3	6	6
4	(Norway) Casper Ruud	6	3	4
PR	(United States) Jenson Brooksby	4	3
2	(United States) Taylor Fritz	6	6

Final
1	(Spain) Carlos Alcaraz	6	6
2	(United States) Taylor Fritz	4	4

=== Top half ===
First round
1	(Spain) C Alcaraz	6	6
(Argentina) S Báez	4	2
(Belgium) Z Bergs	1	7^{7}	7^{7}
(Chile) A Tabilo	6	6^{2}	6^{4}
(Australia) J Thompson	7^{8}	6^{4}	2
(United States) B Nakashima	6^{6}	7^{7}	6
Q	(Hungary) M Fucsovics	3	6	7
8	(United States) F Tiafoe	6	1	5
4	(Norway) C Ruud	4	6	6
WC	(Japan) S Mochizuki	6	1	1
(Spain) J Munar	4	2
(Italy) M Berrettini	6	6
(Bosnia and Herzegovina) D Džumhur	4	6	3
Q	(Australia) A Vukic	6	3	6
(Germany) D Altmaier	7	6
7	(Canada) D Shapovalov	5	3

Second round
1	(Spain) C Alcaraz	6	6
(Belgium) Z Bergs	4	3
(United States) B Nakashima	7	6
Q	(Hungary) M Fucsovics	5	3
4	(Norway) C Ruud	7^{7}	6
(Italy) M Berrettini	6^{4}	2
Q	(Australia) A Vukic	6	6
(Germany) D Altmaier	4	2

Quarterfinals
1	(Spain) C Alcaraz	6	6
(United States) B Nakashima	2	4
4	(Norway) C Ruud	6	6
Q	(Australia) A Vukic	3	2

Semifinals
1	(Spain) C Alcaraz	3	6	6
4	(Norway) C Ruud	6	3	4

=== Bottom half ===
First round
6	(France) U Humbert	6^{4}	3
PR	(United States) J Brooksby	7^{7}	6
WC	(Japan) Y Nishioka	6^{9}	3
(Italy) L Darderi	7^{11}	6
(United States) A Michelsen	5	2
Q	(United States) E Quinn	7	6
(Serbia) H Medjedovic	6^{7}	1
3	(Denmark) H Rune	7^{9}	6
5	(Czech Republic) T Macháč	3	6^{4}
Q	(Japan) S Shimabukuro	6	7^{7}
(United States) M Giron	6	3	6^{4}
(United States) S Korda	4	6	7^{7}
WC	(Japan) Y Watanuki	6	4	1
(Portugal) N Borges	2	6	6
(Canada) G Diallo	6	3	6^{3}
2	(United States) T Fritz	4	6	7^{7}

Second round
PR	(United States) J Brooksby	7^{9}	6
(Italy) L Darderi	6^{7}	1
Q	(United States) E Quinn	4	2
3	(Denmark) H Rune	6	6
Q	(Japan) S Shimabukuro	1	4
(United States) S Korda	6	6
(Portugal) N Borges	5	6^{4}
2	(United States) T Fritz	7	7^{7}

Quarterfinals
PR	(United States) J Brooksby	6	6
3	(Denmark) H Rune	3	3
(United States) S Korda	3	7^{7}	3
2	(United States) T Fritz	6	6^{5}	6

Semifinals
PR	(United States) J Brooksby	4	3
2	(United States) T Fritz	6	6

== Qualifying ==
=== Seeds ===
1. (Hungary) Márton Fucsovics (qualified)
2. (Italy) Mattia Bellucci (qualifying competition)
3. (United States) Aleksandar Kovacevic (first round)
4. (Argentina) Juan Manuel Cerúndolo (qualifying competition)
5. (Italy) Matteo Arnaldi (qualifying competition)
6. (Australia) Adam Walton (first round)
7. (United States) Ethan Quinn (qualified)
8. (Argentina) Mariano Navone (first round)

=== Qualifiers ===
1. (Hungary) Márton Fucsovics
2. (United States) Ethan Quinn
3. (Australia) Aleksandar Vukic
4. (Japan) Sho Shimabukuro

=== Qualifying draw ===
==== First qualifier ====
First round
1	(Hungary) Márton Fucsovics	6	6
(Austria) Filip Misolic	3	1
(Italy) Luca Nardi	0	7^{7}	3
5	(Italy) Matteo Arnaldi	6	6^{4}	6

Qualifying competition
1	(Hungary) Márton Fucsovics	7	6
5	(Italy) Matteo Arnaldi	5	2

==== Second qualifier ====
First round
2	(Italy) Mattia Bellucci	7^{7}	5	7
WC	(Japan) Yasutaka Uchiyama	6^{5}	7	5
Alt	(Japan) Yuta Shimizu	6^{4}	4
7	(United States) Ethan Quinn	7^{7}	6

Qualifying competition
2	(Italy) Mattia Bellucci	6	4	5
7	(United States) Ethan Quinn	4	6	7

==== Third qualifier ====
First round
3	(United States) Aleksandar Kovacevic	4	7^{7}	2
(Australia) Aleksandar Vukic	6	6^{4}	6
WC	(Japan) Rei Sakamoto	6	6
6	(Australia) Adam Walton	2	4

Qualifying competition
(Australia) Aleksandar Vukic	6	7^{7}
WC	(Japan) Rei Sakamoto	4	6^{5}

==== Fourth qualifier ====
First round
4	(Argentina) Juan Manuel Cerúndolo	6	6
Alt	(Japan) Rio Noguchi	3	2
WC	(Japan) Sho Shimabukuro	6	6
8	(Argentina) Mariano Navone	2	3

Qualifying competition
4	(Argentina) Juan Manuel Cerúndolo	4	3
WC	(Japan) Sho Shimabukuro	6	6
