= 2025 ATP Finals – Singles =

Singles
- 2025 ATP Finals

Final
- Champion: (Italy) Jannik Sinner
- Runner-up: (Spain) Carlos Alcaraz
- Score: 7–6^{(7–4)}, 7–5

Details
- Draw: 8 (round robin + elimination)
- Seeds: 8

Events
Singles	Doubles
- ATP Finals

Defending champion Jannik Sinner defeated Carlos Alcaraz in the final, 7–6^{(7–4)}, 7–5 to win the singles tennis title at the 2025 ATP Finals. It was his 24th ATP Tour title overall. For the second consecutive year, Sinner did not lose a set en route to the title, the first player to do so for multiple years in a row after Ivan Lendl, who achieved the feat in 1985 and 1986. He was the third and youngest player in the Open Era, after Roger Federer and Novak Djokovic, to reach the final of all four majors and the ATP Finals in a single season, in what was the first time since 2016 that the world's top two players contested the final. Upon winning the title undefeated, Sinner earned the highest prize money in tournament history, at US$5.071 million.

After winning all three of his round-robin matches, Alcaraz claimed the ATP year-end No. 1 singles ranking for the second time in his career, after 2022. Sinner was also in contention for the top spot at the beginning of the tournament.

It was Djokovic's 18th qualification for the year-end championships, equaling Federer's record. He withdrew before the start of the tournament due to a shoulder injury and was replaced by first alternate Lorenzo Musetti.

Ben Shelton and Musetti made their respective debuts in the competition, in what marked the first time two Italian men (Sinner and Musetti) qualified for the singles event.

== Seeds ==
1. (Spain) Carlos Alcaraz (final)
2. (Italy) Jannik Sinner (champion)
3. (Germany) Alexander Zverev (round robin)
4. (Serbia) Novak Djokovic (withdrew due to shoulder injury)
5. (United States) Ben Shelton (round robin)
6. (United States) Taylor Fritz (round robin)
7. (Australia) Alex de Minaur (semifinals)
8. (Canada) Félix Auger-Aliassime (semifinals)
9. (Italy) Lorenzo Musetti (round robin)

== Alternates ==
1. (Kazakhstan) Alexander Bublik (did not play)
2. (Norway) Casper Ruud (did not play)

== Draw ==
Key

- Q = Qualifier
- WC = Wild card
- LL = Lucky loser
- Alt = Alternate
- ITF = ITF entry
- PR = Protected ranking
- SR = Special ranking
- SE = Special exempt
- JE = Junior exempt
- JR = Junior Accelerator Programme entrant
- CO = College Accelerator Programme entrant
- NG = Next Gen Accelerator Program entrant
- w/o = Walkover
- r = Retired
- d = Defaulted

=== Finals ===
Semifinals
1	(Spain) Carlos Alcaraz	6	6
8	(Canada) Félix Auger-Aliassime	2	4
2	(Italy) Jannik Sinner	7	6
7	(Australia) Alex de Minaur	5	2

Final
1	(Spain) Carlos Alcaraz	6^{4}	5
2	(Italy) Jannik Sinner	7^{7}	7

=== Jimmy Connors Group ===
		(Spain) Alcaraz	(United States) Fritz	(Australia) de Minaur	(Italy) Musetti	RR; W–L	Set; W–L	Game; W–L	Standings
1	(Spain) Carlos Alcaraz		6–7^{(2–7)}, 7–5, 6–3	7–6^{(7–5)}, 6–2	6–4, 6–1	3–0	6–1 (86%)	44–28 (61%)	1
6	(United States) Taylor Fritz	7–6^{(7–2)}, 5–7, 3–6		6–7^{(3–7)}, 3–6	6–3, 6–4	1–2	3–4 (43%)	36–39 (48%)	3
7	(Australia) Alex de Minaur	6–7^{(5–7)}, 2–6	7–6^{(7–3)}, 6–3		5–7, 6–3, 5–7	1–2	3–4 (43%)	37–39 (49%)	2
9	(Italy) Lorenzo Musetti	4–6, 1–6	3–6, 4–6	7–5, 3–6, 7–5		1–2	2–5 (29%)	29–40 (42%)	4

=== Björn Borg Group ===
		(Italy) Sinner	(Germany) Zverev	(United States) Shelton	(Canada) Auger-Aliassime	RR; W–L	Set; W–L	Game; W–L	Standings
2	(Italy) Jannik Sinner		6–4, 6–3	6–3, 7–6^{(7–3)}	7–5, 6–1	3–0	6–0 (100%)	38–22 (63%)	1
3	(Germany) Alexander Zverev	4–6, 3–6		6–3, 7–6^{(8–6)}	4–6, 6–7^{(4–7)}	1–2	2–4 (33%)	30–34 (47%)	3
5	(United States) Ben Shelton	3–6, 6–7^{(3–7)}	3–6, 6–7^{(6–8)}		6–4, 6–7^{(7–9)}, 5–7	0–3	1–6 (14%)	35–44 (44%)	4
8	(Canada) Félix Auger-Aliassime	5–7, 1–6	6–4, 7–6^{(7–4)}	4–6, 7–6^{(9–7)}, 7–5		2–1	4–3 (57%)	37–40 (48%)	2

Standings are determined by: 1. number of wins; 2. number of matches; 3. in two-player ties, head-to-head records; 4. in three-player ties, (a) percentage of sets won (head-to-head records if two players remain tied), then (b) percentage of games won (head-to-head records if two players remain tied), then (c) ATP rankings.
