= 2025 Novak Djokovic tennis season =

- Full name: Novak Djokovic
- Country: Serbia
- Calendar prize money: $5,140,175

Singles
- Season record: 39–11 (78%)
- Calendar titles: 2
- Year-end ranking: No. 4
- Ranking change from previous year: ▲3

Grand Slam & significant results
- Australian Open: SF
- French Open: SF
- Wimbledon: SF
- US Open: SF

Doubles
- Season record: 2–2 (50%)
- Calendar titles: 0
- Current ranking: 501
- Ranking change from previous year: New entry

Mixed doubles
- Season record: 0–1 (0%)
- Calendar titles: 0

The 2025 Novak Djokovic tennis season, officially began on 31 December 2024, with the start of the 2025 Brisbane International. Djokovic reached all four Grand Slam semifinals but failed to reach at least one final for the first time since 2017.

During this season, Djokovic:

- Won his 100th and 101st ATP titles, becoming the first player to win a title in 20 consecutive years and the 3rd player to win 100 or more titles (after Roger Federer (103) and Jimmy Connors (109)).
- Became the oldest player to reach the semifinals of all four Grand Slams in a year, at the age of 38 years, 103 days.
- Became the oldest men's singles champion on the ATP Tour since its establishment in 1990, and the third-oldest men's singles tour-level champion in the Open Era.
- Extended his record of 60 Grand Slam men's singles quarterfinals to 64.
- Extended his record of 49 Grand Slam men's singles semifinals to 53.
- Became the first player to have a minimum of 95 wins at each Grand Slam in the Open Era.
- Extended his Open Era record of 259 wins over top 10 ranked men's singles players to 263.
- Extended his Open Era record of 377 career Grand Slam matches wins to 397.
- Surpassed Roger Federer's record of 191 career hardcourt majors wins to 194.
- Surpassed Rafael Nadal's record of 410 for most ATP Masters 1000 tournament wins with 418.
- Surpassed Roger Federer's record for the oldest player to reach a quarterfinal, semifinal and final in Masters 1000 history.
- Qualified for the ATP Finals for an 18th time, tying Federer's record.

== Yearly summary ==
=== Early hard court season ===
==== Brisbane International ====
Djokovic's first tournament of the year was in Brisbane, where he reached the quarterfinals and lost to Reilly Opelka in two sets.

==== Australian Open ====
Djokovic reached his 12th Australian Open semifinal and 50th major quarterfinal overall after he prevailed over Carlos Alcaraz in the quarterfinal in four sets. However, his run ended when he retired in his semifinal match against Alexander Zverev due to a muscle tear after only one set played. His second round match at the Australian Open marked his 430th career major main draw singles match, surpassing Roger Federer's all-time record.

==== Qatar Open ====
Djokovic participated in the newly upgraded ATP 500 Tournament in Doha, but lost to Matteo Berrettini in the first round. This marked the first time Djokovic lost in any first round since the 2016 Summer Olympics.

==== Indian Wells Open ====
Djokovic received a first round bye into the Indian Wells Open and was then defeated by lucky loser Botic van de Zandschulp in three sets in the second round. This marked the second year in a row Djokovic lost to a lucky loser at the same tournament, following another early exit by Luca Nardi the previous year. This also marked the first time since 2018 that Djokovic suffered back-to-back opening round match defeats since his back-to-back defeats in 2018 (Indian Wells and Miami).

==== Miami Open ====
Djokovic reached the third round defeating Rinky Hijikata and equaled Rafael Nadal’s record number of Masters 1000-level wins at 410. With his win over lucky loser Camilo Ugo Carabelli in the third round, Djokovic claimed his 411th career main draw win at Masters 1000 level, surpassing Nadal's record. He then lost in the final to Jakub Menšík in two tight tiebreaks.

=== Clay court season ===
==== Monte-Carlo Masters ====
Djokovic was defeated by Alejandro Tabilo in the second round after receiving a bye. Tabilo was the third ever person to defeat Djokovic multiple times with no losses, following Marat Safin and Jiří Veselý.

==== Madrid Open ====
Djokovic was upset in the second round by Matteo Arnaldi. This was the second time in 2025 that Djokovic suffered back-to-back opening round match defeats.

==== Geneva Open ====
Djokovic defeated Hubert Hurkacz in the final (5–7, 7–6^{(7–2)}, 7–6^{(7–2)}) to win the title. It was his 100th ATP Tour title, joining Federer (103) and Jimmy Connors (109) as the only 3 players to have won 100 or more singles titles during their career. Djokovic also became the first ever tennis player to win at least one ATP singles title in 20 consecutive seasons. Aged 38 years and two days old, Djokovic was the third-oldest man to win an ATP Tour singles title (behind Gaël Monfils and Federer).

==== French Open ====
Djokovic reached a record-extending 51st major semifinal, where he lost in straight sets to world No. 1 Jannik Sinner. With his 4th round win over Cameron Norrie, Djokovic became the second player (after Nadal) to achieve 100 career match wins at the French Open, as well as the third man to win 100 matches at a major, alongside Nadal at the French Open and Federer at both the Australian Open and Wimbledon Championships. Additionally, Djokovic broke Federer's record for the most quarterfinals at one major, with 19, and was the second-oldest man in the Open Era to reach the French Open semifinals (after Pancho Gonzales in 1968 at 40 years of age).

=== Grass court season ===
==== Wimbledon ====
Djokovic was again defeated by Sinner in the semifinal (his record-extending 52nd semifinal), with Djokovic noting that the "age, the wear and tear of the body" meant he was limited in his ability to beat players like Sinner or Alcaraz. It was the first time he failed to make the Wimbledon final since 2017. With his third round win, Djokovic recorded his 100th match win at Wimbledon and became the second man to record 100 or more wins at two majors (after Federer), in addition to the French Open. Djokovic made his 19th career third round appearance and 14th semifinal appearance at Wimbledon, the most by any man in the Open Era.

=== Outdoor hard court season ===
==== US Open ====
At the 2025 US Open, Djokovic reached the semifinals where he lost to Alcaraz in straight sets. He became both the oldest player to reach all four major semifinals in a year and the first male player to lose in the semifinals of all four Grand Slam tournaments in the same year. Djokovic's semifinal match against Alcaraz marked his 53rd semifinal, breaking a tie with Chris Evert (52 major semifinals) to become the first player to reach 53 major semifinals.

== All matches ==
This table chronicles all the matches of Novak Djokovic in 2025.

Key
W	F	SF	QF	#R	RR	Q#	P#	DNQ	A	Z#	PO	G	S	B	NMS	NTI	P	NH

(W) winner; (F) finalist; (SF) semifinalist; (QF) quarterfinalist; (#R) rounds 4, 3, 2, 1; (RR) round-robin stage; (Q#) qualification round; (P#) preliminary round; (DNQ) did not qualify; (A) absent; (Z#) Davis/Fed Cup Zonal Group (with number indication) or (PO) play-off; (G) gold, (S) silver or (B) bronze Olympic/Paralympic medal; (NMS) not a Masters tournament; (NTI) not a Tier I tournament; (P) postponed; (NH) not held; (SR) strike rate (events won / competed); (W–L) win–loss record.
To avoid confusion and double counting, these charts are updated at the conclusion of a tournament or when the player's participation has ended.

=== Singles matches ===
Tournament	Match	Round	Opponent (seed or key)	Rank	Result	Score
Brisbane International; Brisbane, Australia; ATP 250; Hard, outdoor 30 December 2024 – 5 January 2025
Brisbane International; Brisbane, Australia; ATP 250; Hard, outdoor 30 December 2024 – 5 January 2025	1 / 1347	1R	(Australia) Rinky Hijikata (WC)	73	Win	6–3, 6–3
Brisbane International; Brisbane, Australia; ATP 250; Hard, outdoor 30 December 2024 – 5 January 2025	2 / 1348	2R	(France) Gaël Monfils	55	Win	6–3, 6–3
Brisbane International; Brisbane, Australia; ATP 250; Hard, outdoor 30 December 2024 – 5 January 2025	3 / 1349	QF	(United States) Reilly Opelka (PR)	293	Loss	6–7^{(6–8)}, 3–6
Australian Open; Melbourne, Australia; Grand Slam tournament Hard, outdoor 12–26 January 2025
Australian Open; Melbourne, Australia; Grand Slam tournament Hard, outdoor 12–26 January 2025	4 / 1350	1R	(United States) Nishesh Basavareddy (WC)	107	Win	4–6, 6–3, 6–4, 6–2
Australian Open; Melbourne, Australia; Grand Slam tournament Hard, outdoor 12–26 January 2025	5 / 1351	2R	(Portugal) Jaime Faria (Q)	125	Win	6–1, 6–7^{(4–7)}, 6–3, 6–2
Australian Open; Melbourne, Australia; Grand Slam tournament Hard, outdoor 12–26 January 2025	6 / 1352	3R	(Czech Republic) Tomáš Macháč (26)	25	Win	6–1, 6–4, 6–4
Australian Open; Melbourne, Australia; Grand Slam tournament Hard, outdoor 12–26 January 2025	7 / 1353	4R	(Czech Republic) Jiří Lehečka (24)	29	Win	6–3, 6–4, 7–6^{(7–4)}
Australian Open; Melbourne, Australia; Grand Slam tournament Hard, outdoor 12–26 January 2025	8 / 1354	QF	(Spain) Carlos Alcaraz (3)	3	Win	4–6, 6–4, 6–3, 6–4
Australian Open; Melbourne, Australia; Grand Slam tournament Hard, outdoor 12–26 January 2025	9 / 1355	SF	(Germany) Alexander Zverev (2)	2	Loss	6–7^{(5–7)}, 0–0 ret.
Qatar Open; Doha, Qatar; ATP 500; Hard, outdoor 17–22 February 2025
Qatar Open; Doha, Qatar; ATP 500; Hard, outdoor 17–22 February 2025	10 / 1356	1R	(Italy) Matteo Berrettini	35	Loss	6–7^{(4–7)}, 2–6
Indian Wells Open; Indian Wells, United States; ATP 1000; Hard, outdoor 5–16 March 2025
Indian Wells Open; Indian Wells, United States; ATP 1000; Hard, outdoor 5–16 March 2025	–	1R	Bye			
Indian Wells Open; Indian Wells, United States; ATP 1000; Hard, outdoor 5–16 March 2025	11 / 1357	2R	(Netherlands) Botic van de Zandschulp (LL)	85	Loss	2–6, 6–3, 1–6
Miami Open; Miami Gardens, United States; ATP 1000; Hard, outdoor 18–30 March 2025
Miami Open; Miami Gardens, United States; ATP 1000; Hard, outdoor 18–30 March 2025	–	1R	Bye			
Miami Open; Miami Gardens, United States; ATP 1000; Hard, outdoor 18–30 March 2025	12 / 1358	2R	(Australia) Rinky Hijikata	86	Win	6–0, 7–6^{(7–1)}
Miami Open; Miami Gardens, United States; ATP 1000; Hard, outdoor 18–30 March 2025	13 / 1359	3R	(Argentina) Camilo Ugo Carabelli (LL)	65	Win	6–1, 7–6^{(7–1)}
Miami Open; Miami Gardens, United States; ATP 1000; Hard, outdoor 18–30 March 2025	14 / 1360	4R	(Italy) Lorenzo Musetti (15)	16	Win	6–2, 6–2
Miami Open; Miami Gardens, United States; ATP 1000; Hard, outdoor 18–30 March 2025	15 / 1361	QF	(United States) Sebastian Korda (24)	25	Win	6–3, 7–6^{(7–4)}
Miami Open; Miami Gardens, United States; ATP 1000; Hard, outdoor 18–30 March 2025	16 / 1362	SF	(Bulgaria) Grigor Dimitrov (14)	15	Win	6–2, 6–3
Miami Open; Miami Gardens, United States; ATP 1000; Hard, outdoor 18–30 March 2025	17 / 1363	F	(Czech Republic) Jakub Menšík	54	Loss	6–7^{(4–7)}, 6–7^{(4–7)}
Monte-Carlo Masters; Roquebrune-Cap-Martin, France; ATP 1000; Clay, outdoor 6–13 April 2025
Monte-Carlo Masters; Roquebrune-Cap-Martin, France; ATP 1000; Clay, outdoor 6–13 April 2025	–	1R	Bye			
Monte-Carlo Masters; Roquebrune-Cap-Martin, France; ATP 1000; Clay, outdoor 6–13 April 2025	18 / 1364	2R	(Chile) Alejandro Tabilo	32	Loss	3–6, 4–6
Madrid Open; Madrid, Spain; ATP 1000; Clay, outdoor 22 April − 4 May 2025
Madrid Open; Madrid, Spain; ATP 1000; Clay, outdoor 22 April − 4 May 2025	–	1R	Bye			
Madrid Open; Madrid, Spain; ATP 1000; Clay, outdoor 22 April − 4 May 2025	19 / 1365	2R	(Italy) Matteo Arnaldi	44	Loss	3–6, 4–6
Geneva Open; Geneva, Switzerland; ATP 250; Clay, outdoor 18−24 May 2025
Geneva Open; Geneva, Switzerland; ATP 250; Clay, outdoor 18−24 May 2025	–	1R	Bye			
Geneva Open; Geneva, Switzerland; ATP 250; Clay, outdoor 18−24 May 2025	20 / 1366	2R	(Hungary) Márton Fucsovics	134	Win	6–2, 6–3
Geneva Open; Geneva, Switzerland; ATP 250; Clay, outdoor 18−24 May 2025	21 / 1367	QF	(Italy) Matteo Arnaldi (8)	39	Win	6–4, 6–4
Geneva Open; Geneva, Switzerland; ATP 250; Clay, outdoor 18−24 May 2025	22 / 1368	SF	(United Kingdom) Cameron Norrie (Q)	90	Win	6–4, 6–7^{(6–8)}, 6–1
Geneva Open; Geneva, Switzerland; ATP 250; Clay, outdoor 18−24 May 2025	23 / 1369	W	(Poland) Hubert Hurkacz (6)	31	Win (1)	5–7, 7–6^{(7–2)}, 7–6^{(7–2)}
French Open; Paris, France; Grand Slam tournament Clay, outdoor 25 May – 8 June 2025
French Open; Paris, France; Grand Slam tournament Clay, outdoor 25 May – 8 June 2025	24 / 1370	1R	(United States) Mackenzie McDonald	98	Win	6–3, 6–3, 6–3
French Open; Paris, France; Grand Slam tournament Clay, outdoor 25 May – 8 June 2025	25 / 1371	2R	(France) Corentin Moutet	73	Win	6–3, 6–2, 7–6^{(7–1)}
French Open; Paris, France; Grand Slam tournament Clay, outdoor 25 May – 8 June 2025	26 / 1372	3R	(Austria) Filip Misolic (Q)	153	Win	6–3, 6–4, 6–2
French Open; Paris, France; Grand Slam tournament Clay, outdoor 25 May – 8 June 2025	27 / 1373	4R	(United Kingdom) Cameron Norrie	81	Win	6–2, 6–3, 6–2
French Open; Paris, France; Grand Slam tournament Clay, outdoor 25 May – 8 June 2025	28 / 1374	QF	(Germany) Alexander Zverev (3)	3	Win	4–6, 6–3, 6–2, 6–4
French Open; Paris, France; Grand Slam tournament Clay, outdoor 25 May – 8 June 2025	29 / 1375	SF	(Italy) Jannik Sinner (1)	1	Loss	4–6, 5–7, 6–7^{(3–7)}
Wimbledon; London, United Kingdom; Grand Slam tournament Grass, outdoor 30 June – 13 July 2025
Wimbledon; London, United Kingdom; Grand Slam tournament Grass, outdoor 30 June – 13 July 2025	30 / 1376	1R	(France) Alexandre Müller	41	Win	6–1, 6–7^{(7–9)}, 6–2, 6–2
Wimbledon; London, United Kingdom; Grand Slam tournament Grass, outdoor 30 June – 13 July 2025	31 / 1377	2R	(United Kingdom) Dan Evans (WC)	154	Win	6–3, 6–2, 6–0
Wimbledon; London, United Kingdom; Grand Slam tournament Grass, outdoor 30 June – 13 July 2025	32 / 1378	3R	(Serbia) Miomir Kecmanović	49	Win	6–3, 6–0, 6–4
Wimbledon; London, United Kingdom; Grand Slam tournament Grass, outdoor 30 June – 13 July 2025	33 / 1379	4R	(Australia) Alex de Minaur (11)	11	Win	1–6, 6–4, 6–4, 6–4
Wimbledon; London, United Kingdom; Grand Slam tournament Grass, outdoor 30 June – 13 July 2025	34 / 1380	QF	(Italy) Flavio Cobolli (22)	24	Win	6–7^{(6–8)}, 6–2, 7–5, 6–4
Wimbledon; London, United Kingdom; Grand Slam tournament Grass, outdoor 30 June – 13 July 2025	35 / 1381	SF	(Italy) Jannik Sinner (1)	1	Loss	3–6, 3–6, 4–6
Canadian Open; Montreal, Canada; ATP 1000; Hard, outdoor 26 July – 7 August 2025
Canadian Open; Montreal, Canada; ATP 1000; Hard, outdoor 26 July – 7 August 2025	Withdrew					
Cincinnati Open; Cincinnati, United States; ATP 1000; Hard, outdoor 7–18 August 2025
Cincinnati Open; Cincinnati, United States; ATP 1000; Hard, outdoor 7–18 August 2025	Withdrew					
US Open; New York City, United States; Grand Slam tournament Hard, outdoor 24 August – 7 September 2025
US Open; New York City, United States; Grand Slam tournament Hard, outdoor 24 August – 7 September 2025	36 / 1382	1R	(United States) Learner Tien	50	Win	6–1, 7–6^{(7–3)}, 6–2
US Open; New York City, United States; Grand Slam tournament Hard, outdoor 24 August – 7 September 2025	37 / 1383	2R	(United States) Zachary Svajda (Q)	145	Win	6–7^{(5–7)}, 6–3, 6–3, 6–1
US Open; New York City, United States; Grand Slam tournament Hard, outdoor 24 August – 7 September 2025	38 / 1384	3R	(United Kingdom) Cameron Norrie	35	Win	6–4, 6–7^{(4–7)}, 6–2, 6–3
US Open; New York City, United States; Grand Slam tournament Hard, outdoor 24 August – 7 September 2025	39 / 1385	4R	(Germany) Jan-Lennard Struff (Q)	144	Win	6–3, 6–3, 6–2
US Open; New York City, United States; Grand Slam tournament Hard, outdoor 24 August – 7 September 2025	40 / 1386	QF	(United States) Taylor Fritz (4)	4	Win	6–3, 7–5, 3–6, 6–4
US Open; New York City, United States; Grand Slam tournament Hard, outdoor 24 August – 7 September 2025	41 / 1387	SF	(Spain) Carlos Alcaraz (2)	2	Loss	4–6, 6–7^{(4–7)}, 2–6
Shanghai Masters; Shanghai, China; ATP 1000; Hard, outdoor 1–12 October 2025
Shanghai Masters; Shanghai, China; ATP 1000; Hard, outdoor 1–12 October 2025	–	1R	Bye			
Shanghai Masters; Shanghai, China; ATP 1000; Hard, outdoor 1–12 October 2025	42 / 1388	2R	(Croatia) Marin Čilić	94	Win	7–6^{(7–2)}, 6–4
Shanghai Masters; Shanghai, China; ATP 1000; Hard, outdoor 1–12 October 2025	43 / 1389	3R	(Germany) Yannick Hanfmann (Q)	150	Win	4–6, 7–5, 6–3
Shanghai Masters; Shanghai, China; ATP 1000; Hard, outdoor 1–12 October 2025	44 / 1390	4R	(Spain) Jaume Munar	41	Win	6–3, 5–7, 6–2
Shanghai Masters; Shanghai, China; ATP 1000; Hard, outdoor 1–12 October 2025	45 / 1391	QF	(Belgium) Zizou Bergs	44	Win	6–3, 7–5
Shanghai Masters; Shanghai, China; ATP 1000; Hard, outdoor 1–12 October 2025	46 / 1392	SF	(Monaco) Valentin Vacherot (Q)	204	Loss	3–6, 4–6
Paris Masters; Paris, France; ATP 1000; Hard, indoor 27 October – 2 November 2025
Paris Masters; Paris, France; ATP 1000; Hard, indoor 27 October – 2 November 2025	Withdrew					
Hellenic Championship; Athens, Greece; ATP 250; Hard, indoor 2–8 November 2025
Hellenic Championship; Athens, Greece; ATP 250; Hard, indoor 2–8 November 2025	–	1R	Bye			
Hellenic Championship; Athens, Greece; ATP 250; Hard, indoor 2–8 November 2025	47 / 1393	2R	(Chile) Alejandro Tabilo	89	Win	7–6^{(7–3)}, 6–1
Hellenic Championship; Athens, Greece; ATP 250; Hard, indoor 2–8 November 2025	48 / 1394	QF	(Portugal) Nuno Borges (6)	47	Win	7–6^{(7–1)}, 6–4
Hellenic Championship; Athens, Greece; ATP 250; Hard, indoor 2–8 November 2025	49 / 1395	SF	(Germany) Yannick Hanfmann (Q)	117	Win	6–3, 6–4
Hellenic Championship; Athens, Greece; ATP 250; Hard, indoor 2–8 November 2025	50 / 1396	W	(Italy) Lorenzo Musetti (2)	9	Win (2)	4–6, 6–3, 7–5
ATP Finals; Turin, Italy; ATP Finals; Hard, indoor 9–16 November 2025
ATP Finals; Turin, Italy; ATP Finals; Hard, indoor 9–16 November 2025	Withdrew					

=== Doubles matches ===
Tournament	Match	Round	Opponent (seed or key)	Rank	Result	Score
Brisbane International; Brisbane, Australia; ATP 250; Hard, outdoor 30 December 2024 – 5 January 2025; Partner: (Australia) Nick Kyrgios
Brisbane International; Brisbane, Australia; ATP 250; Hard, outdoor 30 December 2024 – 5 January 2025; Partner: (Australia) Nick Kyrgios	1 / 145	1R	(Austria) Alexander Erler / (Germany) Andreas Mies	42 / 61	Win	6–4, 6–7^{(4–7)}, [10–8]
Brisbane International; Brisbane, Australia; ATP 250; Hard, outdoor 30 December 2024 – 5 January 2025; Partner: (Australia) Nick Kyrgios	2 / 146	2R	(Croatia) Nikola Mektić / (Australia) Michael Venus (1)	6 / 17	Loss	2–6, 6–3, [8–10]
Qatar Open; Doha, Qatar; ATP 500; Hard, outdoor 17–22 February 2025; Partner: (Spain) Fernando Verdasco
Qatar Open; Doha, Qatar; ATP 500; Hard, outdoor 17–22 February 2025; Partner: (Spain) Fernando Verdasco	3 / 147	1R	(Kazakhstan) Alexander Bublik / Karen Khachanov	133 / 121	Win	6–1, 6–1
Qatar Open; Doha, Qatar; ATP 500; Hard, outdoor 17–22 February 2025; Partner: (Spain) Fernando Verdasco	4 / 148	QF	(Finland) Harri Heliövaara / (United Kingdom) Henry Patten (2)	4 / 3	Loss	5–7, 4–6

=== Mixed doubles matches ===
Tournament	Match	Round	Opponent (seed or key)	Rank	Result	Score
US Open; New York City, United States; Grand Slam tournament Hard, outdoor 24 August – 7 September 2025; Partner: (Serbia) Olga Danilović
US Open; New York City, United States; Grand Slam tournament Hard, outdoor 24 August – 7 September 2025; Partner: (Serbia) Olga Danilović	1 / 6	1R	(Note: Russian and Belarus players are not allowed to compete under the name or flag of their country following the Russian invasion of Ukraine.) Mirra Andreeva / Daniil Medvedev	– / –	Loss	2–4, 3–5

== Exhibition matches ==
=== Singles ===
Tournament	Match	Round	Opponent (seed or key)	Rank	Result	Score
Australian Open Opening Week; Melbourne, Australia Hard, outdoor 7 – 10 January 2025
Australian Open Opening Week; Melbourne, Australia Hard, outdoor 7 – 10 January 2025	1	PO	(Germany) Alexander Zverev	2	Win	7–6^{(8–6)}
Giorgio Armani Tennis Classic; London, United Kingdom Grass, outdoor 27 June 2025
Giorgio Armani Tennis Classic; London, United Kingdom Grass, outdoor 27 June 2025	2	PO	Karen Khachanov	19	Loss	6–7^{(4–7)}, 4–6
6 Kings Slam; Riyadh, Saudi Arabia Hard, outdoor 15 – 18 October 2025
6 Kings Slam; Riyadh, Saudi Arabia Hard, outdoor 15 – 18 October 2025	3	SF	(Italy) Jannik Sinner	2	Loss	4–6, 2–6
6 Kings Slam; Riyadh, Saudi Arabia Hard, outdoor 15 – 18 October 2025	4	3rd Place	(United States) Taylor Fritz	4	Loss	6–7^{(4–7)}, 0–0 ret.

== Schedule ==
Per Novak Djokovic, this is his current 2025 schedule (subject to change).

=== Singles schedule ===
Date	Tournament	Location	Tier	Surface	Prev. result	Prev. points	New points	Result
27 December 2024– 5 January 2025	United Cup	Perth/Sydney (AUS)	United Cup	Hard	QF	60	0	Withdrew
29 December 2024– 5 January 2025	Brisbane International	Brisbane (AUS)	ATP 250	Hard	A	0	50	Quarterfinals (lost to Reilly Opelka, 6–7^{(6–8)}, 3–6)
12 January 2025– 26 January 2025	Australian Open	Melbourne (AUS)	Grand Slam	Hard	SF	800	800	Semifinals (lost to Alexander Zverev, 6–7^{(5–7)}, 0–0 ret.)
17 February 2025– 22 February 2025	Qatar Open	Doha (QAT)	ATP 500	Hard	A	0	0	First round (lost to Matteo Berrettini, 6–7^{(4–7)}, 2–6)
5 March 2025– 16 March 2025	Indian Wells Open	Indian Wells (USA)	Masters 1000	Hard	3R	50	10	Second round (lost to Botic van de Zandschulp, 2–6, 6–3, 1–6)
18 March 2025– 30 March 2025	Miami Open	Miami (USA)	Masters 1000	Hard	A	0	650	Final (lost to Jakub Menšík, 6–7^{(4–7)}, 6–7^{(4–7)})
6 April 2025– 13 April 2025	Monte-Carlo Masters	Roquebrune-Cap-Martin (FRA)	Masters 1000	Clay	SF	400	10	Second round (lost to Alejandro Tabilo, 3–6, 4–6)
23 April 2025– 4 May 2025	Madrid Open	Madrid (ESP)	Masters 1000	Clay	A	0	10	Second round (lost to Matteo Arnaldi, 3–6, 4–6)
7 May 2025– 18 May 2025	Italian Open	Rome (ITA)	Masters 1000	Clay	3R	50	0	Withdrew
18 May 2025– 24 May 2025	Geneva Open	Geneva (SUI)	ATP 250	Clay	SF	100	250	Champion (defeated Hubert Hurkacz, 5–7, 7–6^{(7–2)}, 7–6^{(7–2)})
25 May 2025– 8 June 2025	French Open	Paris (FRA)	Grand Slam	Clay	QF	400	800	Semifinals (lost to Jannik Sinner, 4–6, 5–7, 6–7^{(3–7)})
30 June 2025– 13 July 2025	Wimbledon Championships	London (GBR)	Grand Slam	Grass	F	1300	800	Semifinals (lost to Jannik Sinner, 3–6, 3–6, 4–6)
24 August 2025– 7 September 2025	US Open	New York (USA)	Grand Slam	Hard	3R	100	800	Semifinals (lost to Carlos Alcaraz, 4–6, 6–7^{(4–7)}, 2–6)
1 October 2025– 12 October 2025	Shanghai Masters	Shanghai (CHN)	Masters 1000	Hard	F	650	400	Semifinals (lost to Valentin Vacherot, 3–6, 4–6)
27 October 2025– 2 November 2025	Paris Masters	Paris (FRA)	Masters 1000	Hard (i)	A	0	0	Withdrew
2 November 2025– 8 November 2025	Hellenic Championship	Athens (GRE)	ATP 250	Hard (i)	N/A	0	250	Champion (defeated Lorenzo Musetti, 4–6, 6–3, 7–5)
9 November 2025– 16 November 2025	ATP Finals	Turin (ITA)	Tour Finals	Hard (i)	A	0	0	Withdrew
Total year-end points (as of ATP Finals)						3910	4830	
Total year-end points						3910	4830	▲920 difference
Source: Rankings breakdown

== Yearly records ==
=== Head-to-head matchups ===
Novak Djokovic has a 39–11 (78%) ATP match win–loss record in the 2025 season. His record against players who were part of the ATP rankings Top Ten at the time of their meetings is 4–4 (50%). Bold indicates player was ranked top 10 at the time of at least one meeting. The following list is ordered by number of wins:

- (United Kingdom) Cameron Norrie 3–0
- (Germany) Yannick Hanfmann 2–0
- (Australia) Rinky Hijikata 2–0
- (Italy) **Lorenzo Musetti** 2–0
- (United States) Nishesh Basavareddy 1–0
- (Belgium) Zizou Bergs 1–0
- (Portugal) Nuno Borges 1–0
- (Croatia) Marin Čilić 1–0
- (Italy) Flavio Cobolli 1–0
- (Australia) Alex de Minaur 1–0
- (Bulgaria) Grigor Dimitrov 1–0
- (United Kingdom) Dan Evans 1–0
- (Portugal) Jaime Faria 1–0
- (United States) **Taylor Fritz** 1–0
- (Hungary) Márton Fucsovics 1–0
- (Poland) Hubert Hurkacz 1–0
- (Serbia) Miomir Kecmanović 1–0
- (United States) Sebastian Korda 1–0
- (Czech Republic) Jiří Lehečka 1–0
- (Czech Republic) Tomáš Macháč 1–0
- (United States) Mackenzie McDonald 1–0
- (Austria) Filip Misolic 1–0
- (France) Gaël Monfils 1–0
- (France) Corentin Moutet 1–0
- (France) Alexandre Müller 1–0
- (Spain) Jaume Munar 1–0
- (Germany) Jan-Lennard Struff 1–0
- (United States) Zachary Svajda 1–0
- (United States) Learner Tien 1–0
- (Argentina) Camilo Ugo Carabelli 1–0
- (Spain) **Carlos Alcaraz** 1–1
- (Italy) Matteo Arnaldi 1–1
- (Chile) Alejandro Tabilo 1–1
- (Germany) **Alexander Zverev** 1–1
- (Italy) Matteo Berrettini 0–1
- (Czech Republic) Jakub Menšík 0–1
- (United States) Reilly Opelka 0–1
- (Monaco) Valentin Vacherot 0–1
- (Netherlands) Botic van de Zandschulp 0–1
- (Italy) **Jannik Sinner** 0–2

* Statistics correct as of 7 November 2025.

=== Top 10 record (4–4) ===
Category Grand Slam (3–4) Olympic Games (0–0) ATP Finals (0–0) Masters 1000 (0–0) ATP 500 (0–0) ATP 250 (1–0)	Wins by surface Hard (3–2) Clay (1–1) Grass (0–1)	Wins by setting Outdoor (3–4) Indoor (1–0)

Result	W–L	Player	Rk	Event	Surface	Rd	Score	Rk	Ref
Win	1–0	(Spain) Carlos Alcaraz	3	Australian Open, Australia	Hard	QF	4–6, 6–4, 6–3, 6–4	7	
Loss	1–1	(Germany) Alexander Zverev	2	Australian Open, Australia	Hard	SF	6–7^{(5–7)}, 0–0 ret.	7	
Win	2–1	(Germany) Alexander Zverev	3	French Open, France	Clay	QF	4–6, 6–3, 6–2, 6–4	6	
Loss	2–2	(Italy) Jannik Sinner	**1**	French Open, France	Clay	SF	4–6, 5–7, 6–7^{(3–7)}	6	
Loss	2–3	(Italy) Jannik Sinner	**1**	Wimbledon, United Kingdom	Grass	SF	3–6, 3–6, 4–6	6	
Win	3–3	(United States) Taylor Fritz	4	US Open, United States	Hard	QF	6–3, 7–5, 3–6, 6–4	7	
Loss	3–4	(Spain) Carlos Alcaraz	2	US Open, United States	Hard	SF	4–6, 6–7^{(4–7)}, 2–6	7	
Win	4–4	(Italy) Lorenzo Musetti	9	Hellenic Championship, Greece	Hard (i)	F	4–6, 6–3, 7–5	5	

- Key: (Rk) first use, opponent rank; (Rd) round; (Rk) 2nd use, player rank; (Ref) reference; (F) final; (SF) semifinal; (QF) quarterfinal; (#R) rounds 4, 3, 2, 1; (RR) round-robin stage; (Q#) qualifying rounds or stages (3), 2, 1.

=== Finals ===
==== Singles: 3 (2 titles, 1 runner-up) ====
Category Grand Slam (0–0) ATP Finals (0–0) ATP Masters 1000 (0–1) Olympics (0–0) ATP 500 (0–0) ATP 250 (2–0)	Titles by surface Hard (1–1) Clay (1–0) Grass (0–0)	Titles by setting Outdoor (1–1) Indoor (1–0)

Result	W–L	Date	Tournament	Tier	Surface	Opponent	Score
Loss	0–1	Mar 2025	Miami Open, United States	Masters 1000	Hard	(Czech Republic) Jakub Menšík	6–7^{(4–7)}, 6–7^{(4–7)}
Win	1–1	May 2025	Geneva Open, Switzerland	ATP 250	Clay	(Poland) Hubert Hurkacz	5–7, 7–6^{(7–2)}, 7–6^{(7–2)}
Win	2–1	Nov 2025	Hellenic Championship, Greece	ATP 250	Hard (i)	(Italy) Lorenzo Musetti	4–6, 6–3, 7–5

=== Earnings ===
- **Bold** font denotes tournament win

**Singles**
Event	Prize money	Year-to-date
Brisbane International	$18,685	$18,685
Australian Open	A$1,100,000	$694,525
Qatar Open	$21,525	$716,050
Indian Wells Open	$37,650	$753,700
Miami Open	$597,890	$1,351,590
Monte-Carlo Masters	€44,220	$1,400,064
Madrid Open	€30,895	$1,449,985
**Geneva Open**	**€90,675**	$1,553,019
French Open	€690,000	$2,337,066
Wimbledon Championships	£775,000	$3,400,133
US Open	$1,260,000	$4,660,133
Shanghai Masters	$332,160	$4,992,293
**Hellenic Championship**	**€116,690**	$5,127,245
		$5,127,245
**Doubles**
Event	Prize money	Year-to-date
Brisbane International	$1,490	$1,490
Qatar Open	$11,440	$12,930
**Total**
		**$5,140,175**

Figures in United States dollars (USD) unless noted.

- source：2025 Singles Activity
- source：2025 Doubles Activity

== See also ==
- 2025 ATP Tour
- 2025 Carlos Alcaraz tennis season
- 2025 Jannik Sinner tennis season
