= 2026 Rolex Paris Masters =

- Date: 2 – 8 November
- Edition: 54th
- Category: ATP Tour Masters 1000
- Draw: 56S / 24D
- Surface: Hard (indoor)
- Location: Nanterre, France
- Venue: Plenitude Arena

Champions

Singles
- (Spain) Carlos Alcaraz

Doubles
- (France) Quentin Halys / (France) Pierre-Hugues Herbert
- Paris Masters

The 2026 Rolex Paris Masters was a professional men's tennis tournament that was played on indoor hard courts. It was the 54th edition of this ATP Masters 1000 event on the 2026 ATP Tour. It took place from 2 November to 8 November 2026 at Plenitude Arena in Nanterre.

== Champions ==
=== Singles ===
- (Spain) Carlos Alcaraz def. (United States) Ben Shelton, 7–6^{(7–5)}, 7–5

=== Doubles ===
- (France) Quentin Halys / (France) Pierre-Hugues Herbert def. (United States) Christian Harrison / (United Kingdom) Neal Skupski, 7–6^{(7–3)}, 6–7^{(4–7)}, [10–8]

== Point distribution ==
Event	W	F	SF	QF	Round of 16	Round of 32	Round of 64	Q	Q2	Q1
Men's Singles	1,000	600	360	180	90	45	10	25	16	0
Men's Doubles	1,000	600	360	180	90	0	—N/a	—N/a	—N/a	—N/a

=== Prize money ===
Event	W	F	SF	QF	Round of 16	Round of 32	Round of 64	Q2	Q1
Men's Singles	€947,370	€532,120	€290,960	€158,700	€84,890	€45,520	€25,220	€12,920	€6,765
Men's Doubles*	€298,950	€162,400	€89,210	€49,220	€27,050	€14,770	—N/a	—N/a	—N/a

_{*per team}

== Singles main-draw entrants ==
=== Seeds ===
The following are the seeded players. Seedings are based on ATP rankings as of 26 October 2026. Rankings and points before are as of 2 November 2026.

Because the tournament takes place one week later this year, points from the 2025 Paris Masters had already been deducted from ranking points as of 2 November 2026. Accordingly, the points defending column reflects either (a) results from tournaments which took place during the week of 3 November 2025 (Athens and Metz) or (b) the player's 18th best result.

^{‡}	Champion
^{†}	Runner-up

Seed	Rank	Player	Points before	Points defending (Athens / Metz)	Points won	Points after	Status
1	1	(Germany) Alexander Zverev	9,550	(10)^{∆}	10	9,550	Second round lost to (Italy) Lorenzo Musetti
2	3	(Spain) Carlos Alcaraz	6,100	(0)^{∆}	1000	7,100	Champion, defeated (United States) Ben Shelton [3]
3	4	(United States) Ben Shelton	4,530	(10)^{∆}	650	5,170	Runner-up, lost to (Spain) Carlos Alcaraz [2]
4	5	Daniil Medvedev	3,860	(50)^{∆}	100	3,820	Second round lost to (Peru) Ignacio Buse
5	6	(Italy) Flavio Cobolli	3,690	(10)^{∆}	0	3,680	Withdrew due to left leg injury
6	7	(France) Arthur Fils	3,525	(0)^{∆}	100	3,625	Third round lost to (United States) Taylor Fritz [11]
7	8	(United States) Frances Tiafoe	3,430	(50)^{∆}	10	3,390	Second round lost to (France) Quentin Halys
8	9	(Australia) Alex de Minaur	3,410	(50)^{∆}	10	3,370	Second round lost to (Argentina) Tomás Martín Etcheverry
9	10	(Spain) Rafael Jódar	3,209	(25)^{∆}	50	3,234	Second round lost to (Norway) Casper Ruud
10	11	(Serbia) Novak Djokovic	3,140	250	50	2,940	Second round lost to (Australia) Rinky Hijikata [Q]
11	12	(United States) Taylor Fritz	3,095	(10)^{∆}	200	3,285	Quarterfinals lost to (Spain) Carlos Alcaraz [2]
12	14	(United States) Tommy Paul	2,775	(50)^{∆}	200	2,925	Quarterfinals lost to (United States) Ben Shelton [3]
13	17	(Spain) Alejandro Davidovich Fokina	2,510	(10)^{∆}	0	2,500	Withdrew due to back injury
14	18	(United States) Brandon Nakashima	2,375	(25)^{∆}	10	2,360	First round lost to (Italy) Matteo Berrettini
15	19	(United States) Learner Tien	2,345	250	50	2,145	Second round lost to (France) Luca Van Assche
16	20	(Argentina) Francisco Cerúndolo	2,260	(50)^{∆}	10	2,220	First round retired against (France) Arthur Rinderknech

∆ The player is defending points from his 18th best result.

==== Withdrawn players ====
The following players would have been seeded, but withdrew before the tournament began.

Rank	Player	Points before	Points dropping	Points after	Withdrawal reason
2	(Italy) Jannik Sinner	9,450	(0)^{∆}	9,450	Right knee injury
13	(Canada) Félix Auger-Aliassime	2,875	(10)^{∆}	2,865	Left knee injury
16	(Czech Republic) Jakub Menšík	2,545	(45)^{∆}	2,500	Head injury

∆ The player is defending points from his 18th best result.

=== Other entrants ===
The following players received wildcards into the singles main draw:

- (France) Titouan Droguet
- (France) Arthur Géa
- (France) Kyrian Jacquet
- (France) Moïse Kouamé

The following player received entry using a protected ranking:

- (Denmark) Holger Rune

The following player received entry as a special exempt:

- (Germany) Jan-Lennard Struff

The following players received entry from the qualifying draw:

- (Italy) Mattia Bellucci
- (France) Benjamin Bonzi
- (Argentina) Juan Manuel Cerúndolo
- (Australia) Rinky Hijikata
- (Czech Republic) Tomáš Macháč
- (Slovakia) Alex Molčan
- (Italy) Lorenzo Sonego

The following players received entry as lucky losers:

- (Argentina) Sebastián Báez
- (Portugal) Nuno Borges
- (Argentina) Thiago Agustín Tirante
- (Paraguay) Adolfo Daniel Vallejo

=== Withdrawals ===
- ‡ (Canada) Félix Auger-Aliassime → replaced by (Italy) Matteo Berrettini
- † (Belgium) Alexander Blockx → replaced by (Argentina) Sebastián Báez
- ‡ (Kazakhstan) Alexander Bublik → replaced by (Argentina) Mariano Navone
- † (Italy) Flavio Cobolli → replaced by (Argentina) Thiago Agustín Tirante
- † (Spain) Alejandro Davidovich Fokina → replaced by (Portugal) Nuno Borges
- ‡ (Brazil) João Fonseca → replaced by (France) Luca Van Assche
- ‡ (Czech Republic) Jakub Menšík → replaced by (France) Quentin Halys
- ‡ (Italy) Jannik Sinner → replaced by (Spain) Daniel Mérida
- † (Greece) Stefanos Tsitsipas → replaced by (Paraguay) Adolfo Daniel Vallejo

‡ – withdrew from entry list
† – withdrew from main draw

== Doubles main-draw entrants ==
=== Seeds ===
Country	Player	Country	Player	Rank^{1}	Seed
FIN	Harri Heliövaara	GBR	Henry Patten	2	1
USA	Christian Harrison	GBR	Neal Skupski	7	2
ESP	Marcel Granollers	ARG	Horacio Zeballos	11	3
ESA	Marcelo Arévalo	CRO	Mate Pavić	17	4
ITA	Simone Bolelli	ITA	Andrea Vavassori	17	5
GER	Kevin Krawietz	GER	Tim Pütz	23	6
GBR	Julian Cash	GBR	Lloyd Glasspool	26	7
BRA	Orlando Luz	BRA	Rafael Matos	31	8

- Rankings are as of 26 October 2026.

=== Other entrants ===
The following pairs received wildcards into the doubles main draw:

- (France) Benjamin Bonzi / (France) Arthur Rinderknech
- (France) Quentin Halys / (France) Pierre-Hugues Herbert
- ~~(Monaco) Valentin Vacherot / (France) Luca Van Assche~~

The following pairs received entry as alternates:

- (France) Arthur Bonnaud / (France) Liam Branger
- (United States) Robert Galloway / (Sweden) André Göransson
- (Spain) Sergio Martos Gornés / (Poland) Szymon Walków
- (Argentina) Mariano Navone / (Chile) Alejandro Tabilo
- (France) Arthur Reymond / (France) Luca Sanchez

=== Withdrawals ===
- (Italy) Matteo Berrettini / (Italy) Flavio Cobolli → replaced by (Argentina) Mariano Navone / (Chile) Alejandro Tabilo
- (Peru) Ignacio Buse / (Italy) Luciano Darderi → replaced by (United States) Robert Galloway / (Sweden) André Göransson
- (Austria) Alexander Erler / Daniil Medvedev → replaced by (France) Arthur Bonnaud / (France) Liam Branger
- (Brazil) Marcelo Melo / (Germany) Alexander Zverev → replaced by (France) Arthur Reymond / (France) Luca Sanchez
- (Monaco) Hugo Nys / (France) Édouard Roger-Vasselin → replaced by (Spain) Sergio Martos Gornés / (Poland) Szymon Walków
- (Monaco) Valentin Vacherot / (France) Luca Van Assche → not replaced
