= 2026 Rolex Paris Masters – Doubles =

Doubles
- 2026 Rolex Paris Masters

Final
- Champions: (France) Quentin Halys (France) Pierre-Hugues Herbert
- Runners-up: (United States) Christian Harrison (United Kingdom) Neal Skupski
- Score: 7–6^{(7–3)}, 6–7^{(4–7)}, [10–8]

Details
- Draw: 28
- Seeds: 8

Events
Singles	Doubles
- Rolex Paris Masters

Quentin Halys and Pierre-Hugues Herbert defeated Christian Harrison and Neal Skupski in the final, 7–6^{(7–3)}, 6–7^{(4–7)}, [10–8] to win the doubles tennis title at the 2026 Paris Masters. As a result of Harrison and Skupski's loss, Harri Heliövaara and Henry Patten claimed the team year-end No. 1 ranking.

Heliövaara and Patten were the defending champions, but lost in the semifinals to Halys and Herbert.

== Seeds ==
The top four seeds received a bye into the second round.

1. (Finland) Harri Heliövaara / (United Kingdom) Henry Patten (semifinals)
2. (United States) Christian Harrison / (United Kingdom) Neal Skupski (final)
3. (Spain) Marcel Granollers / (Argentina) Horacio Zeballos (second round)
4. (El Salvador) Marcelo Arévalo / (Croatia) Mate Pavić (second round)
5. (Italy) Simone Bolelli / (Italy) Andrea Vavassori (second round)
6. (Germany) Kevin Krawietz / (Germany) Tim Pütz (second round, withdrew)
7. (United Kingdom) Julian Cash / (United Kingdom) Lloyd Glasspool (first round)
8. (Brazil) Orlando Luz / (Brazil) Rafael Matos (second round)

== Draw ==
Key

- Q = Qualifier
- WC = Wild card
- LL = Lucky loser
- Alt = Alternate
- ITF = ITF entry
- PR = Protected ranking
- SR = Special ranking
- SE = Special exempt
- JE = Junior exempt
- JR = Junior Accelerator Programme entrant
- CO = College Accelerator Programme entrant
- NG = Next Gen Accelerator Program entrant
- w/o = Walkover
- r = Retired
- d = Defaulted

=== Finals ===
Semifinals
1	(Finland) Harri Heliövaara (United Kingdom) Henry Patten	4	6^{3}
WC	(France) Quentin Halys (France) Pierre-Hugues Herbert	6	7^{7}
(Austria) Lucas Miedler (Austria) Neil Oberleitner	4	4
2	(United States) Christian Harrison (United Kingdom) Neal Skupski	6	6

Final
WC	(France) Quentin Halys (France) Pierre-Hugues Herbert	7^{7}	6^{4}	[10]
2	(United States) Christian Harrison (United Kingdom) Neal Skupski	6^{3}	7^{7}	[8]

=== Top half ===
First round
Alt	(Spain) S Martos Gornés (Poland) S Walków	4	4
(France) S Doumbia (Netherlands) D Pel	6	6
Alt	(United States) R Galloway (Sweden) A Göransson	5	6^{4}
WC	(France) B Bonzi (France) A Rinderknech	7	7^{7}
Alt	(France) A Bonnaud (France) L Branger	3	6	[4]
6	(Germany) K Krawietz (Germany) T Pütz	6	3	[10]
(United States) A Krajicek (Croatia) N Mektić	6^{5}	6	[7]
WC	(France) Q Halys (France) P-H Herbert	7^{7}	1	[10]
(Argentina) G Andreozzi (France) M Guinard	6^{5}	6^{3}
(Czech Republic) A Pavlásek (Czech Republic) P Rikl	7^{7}	7^{7}
(France) T Arribagé (France) A Olivetti	6^{5}	6	[11]
7	(United Kingdom) J Cash (United Kingdom) L Glasspool	7^{7}	3	[9]

Second round
1	(Finland) H Heliövaara (United Kingdom) H Patten	6	4	[10]
(France) S Doumbia (Netherlands) D Pel	2	6	[6]
WC	(France) B Bonzi (France) A Rinderknech	w/o
6	(Germany) K Krawietz (Germany) T Pütz
3	(Spain) M Granollers (Argentina) H Zeballos	6	3	[7]
WC	(France) Q Halys (France) P-H Herbert	4	6	[10]
(Czech Republic) A Pavlásek (Czech Republic) P Rikl	4	7^{7}	[6]
(France) T Arribagé (France) A Olivetti	6	6^{5}	[10]

Quarterfinals
1	(Finland) H Heliövaara (United Kingdom) H Patten	7	6
WC	(France) B Bonzi (France) A Rinderknech	5	4
WC	(France) Q Halys (France) P-H Herbert	7	6
(France) T Arribagé (France) A Olivetti	5	3

Semifinals
1	(Finland) H Heliövaara (United Kingdom) H Patten	4	6^{3}
WC	(France) Q Halys (France) P-H Herbert	6	7^{7}

=== Bottom half ===
First round
8	(Brazil) O Luz (Brazil) R Matos	6	6
(Argentina) M Navone (Chile) A Tabilo	4	3
(Austria) L Miedler (Austria) N Oberleitner	5	6	[10]
Alt	(France) A Reymond (France) L Sanchez	7	2	[3]
PR	(Czech Republic) P Nouza (New Zealand) M Venus	6	3	[10]
(Portugal) F Cabral (United States) JJ Tracy	3	6	[5]
5	(Italy) S Bolelli (Italy) A Vavassori	6	3	[10]
(Germany) J Schnaitter (Germany) M Wallner	3	6	[6]
(United States) R Cash (United States) B Nakashima	w/o
WC	(Monaco) V Vacherot (France) L Van Assche
(Argentina) F Cerúndolo (Argentina) TM Etcheverry	6	1	[10]
(Australia) M Polmans (Poland) J Zieliński	4	6	[3]

Second round
8	(Brazil) O Luz (Brazil) R Matos	3	6^{5}
(Austria) L Miedler (Austria) N Oberleitner	6	7^{7}
PR	(Czech Republic) P Nouza (New Zealand) M Venus	6	7^{7}
4	(El Salvador) M Arévalo (Croatia) M Pavić	3	6^{4}
5	(Italy) S Bolelli (Italy) A Vavassori	1	6^{5}
(United States) R Cash (United States) B Nakashima	6	7^{7}
(Argentina) F Cerúndolo (Argentina) TM Etcheverry
2	(United States) C Harrison (United Kingdom) N Skupski	w/o

Quarterfinals
(Austria) L Miedler (Austria) N Oberleitner	6^{12}	6	[10]
PR	(Czech Republic) P Nouza (New Zealand) M Venus	7^{14}	4	[5]
(United States) R Cash (United States) B Nakashima	6^{5}	4
2	(United States) C Harrison (United Kingdom) N Skupski	7^{7}	6

Semifinals
(Austria) L Miedler (Austria) N Oberleitner	4	4
2	(United States) C Harrison (United Kingdom) N Skupski	6	6
