= 2025 Geneva Open – Doubles =

Doubles
- 2025 Geneva Open

Final
- Champions: (France) Sadio Doumbia (France) Fabien Reboul
- Runners-up: (Uruguay) Ariel Behar (Belgium) Joran Vliegen
- Score: 6–7^{(4–7)}, 6–4, [11–9]

Events
Singles	Doubles
- Geneva Open

Sadio Doumbia and Fabien Reboul defeated Ariel Behar and Joran Vliegen in the final, 6–7^{(4–7)}, 6–4, [11–9] to win the doubles tennis title at the 2025 Geneva Open. They saved multiple match points during the tournament: one match point against Santiago González and Austin Krajicek in the first round and three championship points in the final.

Marcelo Arévalo and Mate Pavić were the defending champions, but lost in the quarterfinals to Behar and Vliegen.

== Seeds ==
1. (El Salvador) Marcelo Arévalo / (Croatia) Mate Pavić (quarterfinals)
2. (India) Yuki Bhambri / (United States) Robert Galloway (first round)
3. (Australia) Matthew Ebden / (Australia) John Peers (quarterfinals)
4. (Brazil) Rafael Matos / (Brazil) Marcelo Melo (first round)

== Draw ==
Key

- Q = Qualifier
- WC = Wild card
- LL = Lucky loser
- Alt = Alternate
- ITF = ITF entry
- PR = Protected ranking
- SR = Special ranking
- SE = Special exempt
- JE = Junior exempt
- JR = Junior Accelerator Programme entrant
- CO = College Accelerator Programme entrant
- NG = Next Gen Accelerator Program entrant
- w/o = Walkover
- r = Retired
- d = Defaulted

=== Draw ===
First round
1	(El Salvador) M Arévalo (Croatia) M Pavić	6	6
(Austria) A Erler (Germany) C Frantzen	4	4
WC	(Switzerland) J Paul (Switzerland) D Stricker	3	6	[9]
(Uruguay) A Behar (Belgium) J Vliegen	6	4	[11]
3	(Australia) M Ebden (Australia) J Peers	7^{7}	7^{7}
WC	(France) P-H Herbert (France) N Mahut	6^{4}	6^{1}
(Portugal) F Cabral (Austria) L Miedler	6	3	[10]
(India) R Bopanna (Czech Republic) A Pavlásek	1	6	[4]
(Mexico) S González (United States) A Krajicek	6	2	[9]
(France) S Doumbia (France) F Reboul	3	6	[11]
(Argentina) G Andreozzi (France) T Arribagé	6	6
4	(Brazil) R Matos (Brazil) M Melo	4	3
(France) Q Halys (France) A Olivetti	6	7
(Croatia) I Dodig (Brazil) O Luz	4	5
(Germany) J Schnaitter (Germany) M Wallner	7^{7}	6
2	(India) Y Bhambri (United States) R Galloway	6^{3}	4

Quarterfinals
1	(El Salvador) M Arévalo (Croatia) M Pavić	6^{5}	4
(Uruguay) A Behar (Belgium) J Vliegen	7^{7}	6
3	(Australia) M Ebden (Australia) J Peers	1	6	[7]
(Portugal) F Cabral (Austria) L Miedler	6	3	[10]
(France) S Doumbia (France) F Reboul	6	5	[10]
(Argentina) G Andreozzi (France) T Arribagé	2	7	[7]
(France) Q Halys (France) A Olivetti	0	6^{4}
(Germany) J Schnaitter (Germany) M Wallner	6	7^{7}

Semifinals
(Uruguay) A Behar (Belgium) J Vliegen	6^{8}	6	[10]
(Portugal) F Cabral (Austria) L Miedler	7^{10}	1	[6]
(France) S Doumbia (France) F Reboul	3	6	[10]
(Germany) J Schnaitter (Germany) M Wallner	6	4	[7]

Final
(Uruguay) A Behar (Belgium) J Vliegen	7^{7}	4	[9]
(France) S Doumbia (France) F Reboul	6^{4}	6	[11]
