= Hellenic Championship =

Hellenic Championship may refer to:

- Hellenic Championship (tennis), an ATP 250 level tennis tournament
- Super League Greece, a professional men's association football league in Greece also called the Hellenic League.
