= 2025 Hellenic Championship – Doubles =

Doubles
- 2025 Hellenic Championship

Final
- Champions: (Portugal) Francisco Cabral (Austria) Lucas Miedler
- Runners-up: (Mexico) Santiago González (Netherlands) David Pel
- Score: 4–6, 6–3, [10–3]

Details
- Draw: 16 (2 WC )
- Seeds: 4

Events
| Singles | Doubles |
- Hellenic Championship

Francisco Cabral and Lucas Miedler defeated Santiago González and David Pel in the final, 4–6, 6–3, [10–3] to win the doubles tennis title at the 2025 Hellenic Championship.

This was the first edition of the tournament, which replaced the Belgrade Open on the calendar.

== Seeds ==
1. (France) Sadio Doumbia / (France) Fabien Reboul (semifinals)
2. (Portugal) Francisco Cabral / (Austria) Lucas Miedler (champions)
3. (Mexico) Santiago González / (Netherlands) David Pel (final)
4. (Australia) John Peers / (United States) JJ Tracy (quarterfinals)

== Draw ==
Key

- Q = Qualifier
- WC = Wild card
- LL = Lucky loser
- Alt = Alternate
- ITF = ITF entry
- PR = Protected ranking
- SR = Special ranking
- SE = Special exempt
- JE = Junior exempt
- JR = Junior Accelerator Programme entrant
- CO = College Accelerator Programme entrant
- NG = Next Gen Accelerator Program entrant
- w/o = Walkover
- r = Retired
- d = Defaulted

=== Draw ===
First round
1 | (France) S Doumbia (France) F Reboul | 7^{8} | 6
(United States) M Giron (United States) E King | 6^{6} | 4
WC | (Greece) Pa Tsitsipas (Greece) Pe Tsitsipas | 2 | 4
(United States) V Kirkov (Netherlands) B Stevens | 6 | 6
3 | (Mexico) S González (Netherlands) D Pel | 6 | 4 | [10]
(Argentina) TM Etcheverry (Chile) A Tabilo | 4 | 6 | [4]
(Czech Republic) A Pavlásek (United States) R Seggerman | 7^{7} | 6^{12} | [10]
(Uruguay) A Behar (Belgium) J Vliegen | 6^{5} | 7^{14} | [7]
(Bosnia and Herzegovina) D Džumhur (Poland) K Majchrzak | 6 | 4 | [5]
(Belgium) S Gillé (Netherlands) S Verbeek | 2 | 6 | [10]
(Italy) L Darderi (Argentina) TA Tirante | 3 | 6^{4}
4 | (Australia) J Peers (United States) JJ Tracy | 6 | 7^{7}
(Monaco) R Arneodo (Colombia) N Barrientos | 6 | 4 | [7]
(Austria) A Erler (United States) R Galloway | 4 | 6 | [10]
WC | (Greece) D Sakellaridis (Greece) S Sakellaridis | 4 | 4
2 | (Portugal) F Cabral (Austria) L Miedler | 6 | 6

Quarterfinals
1 | (France) S Doumbia (France) F Reboul | 6 | 6
(United States) V Kirkov (Netherlands) B Stevens | 4 | 4
3 | (Mexico) S González (Netherlands) D Pel | 7^{7} | 7^{7}
(Czech Republic) A Pavlásek (United States) R Seggerman | 6^{3} | 6^{3}
(Belgium) S Gillé (Netherlands) S Verbeek | 6^{3} | 6 | [10]
4 | (Australia) J Peers (United States) JJ Tracy | 7^{7} | 3 | [1]
(Austria) A Erler (United States) R Galloway | 4 | 5
2 | (Portugal) F Cabral (Austria) L Miedler | 6 | 7

Semifinals
1 | (France) S Doumbia (France) F Reboul | 7 | 6^{3} | [5]
3 | (Mexico) S González (Netherlands) D Pel | 5 | 7^{7} | [10]
(Belgium) S Gillé (Netherlands) S Verbeek | 6^{6} | 2
2 | (Portugal) F Cabral (Austria) L Miedler | 7^{8} | 6

Final
3 | (Mexico) S González (Netherlands) D Pel | 6 | 3 | [3]
2 | (Portugal) F Cabral (Austria) L Miedler | 4 | 6 | [10]
