= 2026 Rolex Paris Masters – Singles =

Singles
- 2026 Rolex Paris Masters

Final
- Champion: (Spain) Carlos Alcaraz
- Runner-up: (United States) Ben Shelton
- Score: 7–6^{(7–5)}, 7–5
- Date: 8 November 2026

Details
- Draw: 56 (7 Q / 4 WC )
- Seeds: 16

Events
Singles	Doubles
- Rolex Paris Masters

Carlos Alcaraz defeated Ben Shelton in the final, 7–6^{(7–5)}, 7–5, to win the singles title at the 2026 Paris Masters. It was his ninth ATP Masters 1000 title and 29th ATP Tour title overall. He saved two match points en route to the title, against Taylor Fritz in the quarterfinals. Alcaraz was the second Spaniard to win the title, following David Ferrer in 2012.

Jannik Sinner was the reigning champion, but withdrew before the tournament began due to a knee injury.

This marked the first tournament played by Alexander Zverev as the incumbent world No. 1. With his second-round defeat to Lorenzo Musetti, Zverev became the fifth player (since the introduction of the ATP rankings) to lose their opening match played as world No. 1, and the first to lose their opening match as world No. 1 in straight sets.

Nuno Borges became the first lucky loser to reach the Paris Masters quarterfinals.

== Seeds ==
The top eight seeds received a bye into the second round.

1. (Germany) Alexander Zverev (second round)
2. (Spain) Carlos Alcaraz (champion)
3. (United States) Ben Shelton (final)
4. Daniil Medvedev (second round)
5. (Italy) Flavio Cobolli (withdrew)
6. (France) Arthur Fils (third round)
7. (United States) Frances Tiafoe (second round)
8. (Australia) Alex de Minaur (second round)
9. (Spain) Rafael Jódar (second round)
10. (Serbia) Novak Djokovic (second round)
11. (United States) Taylor Fritz (quarterfinals)
12. (United States) Tommy Paul (quarterfinals)
13. (Spain) Alejandro Davidovich Fokina (withdrew)
14. (United States) Brandon Nakashima (first round)
15. (United States) Learner Tien (second round)
16. (Argentina) Francisco Cerúndolo (first round, retired)

Click on the seed number of a player to go to their draw section.

== Draw ==
Key

- Q = Qualifier
- WC = Wild card
- LL = Lucky loser
- Alt = Alternate
- ITF = ITF entry
- PR = Protected ranking
- SR = Special ranking
- SE = Special exempt
- JE = Junior exempt
- JR = Junior Accelerator Programme entrant
- CO = College Accelerator Programme entrant
- NG = Next Gen Accelerator Program entrant
- w/o = Walkover
- r = Retired
- d = Defaulted

=== Finals ===
Quarterfinals
(France) Luca Van Assche	6	6^{4}	7
Q	(Australia) Rinky Hijikata	4	7^{7}	5
3	(United States) Ben Shelton	6	4	6
12	(United States) Tommy Paul	4	6	3
(Norway) Casper Ruud	7^{7}	6
LL	(Portugal) Nuno Borges	6^{5}	4
11	(United States) Taylor Fritz	7^{12}	5	3
2	(Spain) Carlos Alcaraz	6^{10}	7	6

Semifinals
(France) Luca Van Assche	7	3	4
3	(United States) Ben Shelton	5	6	6
(Norway) Casper Ruud	4	4
2	(Spain) Carlos Alcaraz	6	6

Final
3	(United States) Ben Shelton	6^{5}	5
2	(Spain) Carlos Alcaraz	7^{7}	7

=== Top half ===
==== Section 1 ====
First round
(Italy) L Musetti	7^{7}	7^{12}
(Poland) H Hurkacz	6^{3}	6^{10}
(France) L Van Assche	6	7
(Argentina) M Navone	3	5
LL	(Paraguay) AD Vallejo	3	7	5
15	(United States) L Tien	6	5	7
10	(Serbia) N Djokovic	6^{5}	7	6
(Monaco) V Vacherot	7^{7}	5	1
(Italy) L Darderi	2	2
Q	(Australia) R Hijikata	6	6
A Rublev	4	7^{7}	6^{3}
(Argentina) TM Etcheverry	6	6^{4}	7^{7}

Second round
1	(Germany) A Zverev	6^{5}	2
(Italy) L Musetti	7^{7}	6
(France) L Van Assche	7^{7}	6
15	(United States) L Tien	6^{4}	4
10	(Serbia) N Djokovic	6	3	3
Q	(Australia) R Hijikata	2	6	6
(Argentina) TM Etcheverry	7^{7}	6
8	(Australia) A de Minaur	6^{2}	3

Third round
(Italy) L Musetti	5	6	4
(France) L Van Assche	7	3	6
Q	(Australia) R Hijikata	2	6	7
(Argentina) TM Etcheverry	6	3	5

Quarterfinals
(France) L Van Assche	6	6^{4}	7
Q	(Australia) R Hijikata	4	7^{7}	5

==== Section 2 ====
First round
(United Kingdom) C Norrie	6	1	6
(Italy) M Arnaldi	4	6	3
Q	(Italy) M Bellucci	6	6
Q	(Italy) L Sonego	4	3
(France) A Rinderknech	3	7^{7}	2
16	(Argentina) F Cerúndolo	6	6^{2}	0^{r}
12	(United States) T Paul	7	6
PR	(Denmark) H Rune	5	4
(Spain) D Mérida	6	6
LL	(Argentina) S Báez	4	2
(France) Q Halys	7^{8}	7
(United Kingdom) A Fery	6^{6}	5

Second round
3	(United States) B Shelton	6	6
(United Kingdom) C Norrie	3	4
Q	(Italy) M Bellucci	4	1
(France) A Rinderknech	6	6
12	(United States) T Paul	6	6
(Spain) D Mérida	1	1
(France) Q Halys	6	1	7^{11}
7	(United States) F Tiafoe	3	6	6^{9}

Third round
3	(United States) B Shelton	3	6	7^{7}
(France) A Rinderknech	6	4	6^{5}
12	(United States) T Paul	7^{7}	6
(France) Q Halys	6^{3}	4

Quarterfinals
3	(United States) B Shelton	6	4	6
12	(United States) T Paul	4	6	3

=== Bottom half ===
==== Section 3 ====
First round
SE	(Germany) J-L Struff	7^{7}	6
WC	(France) A Géa	6^{3}	3
(Norway) C Ruud	6	6
Q	(Argentina) JM Cerúndolo	3	2
(Chile) A Tabilo	2	3
9	(Spain) R Jódar	6	6
LL	(Portugal) N Borges	6	6
WC	(France) M Kouamé	3	1
(Canada) D Shapovalov	3	7^{8}	4^{r}
K Khachanov	6	6^{6}	1
(Peru) I Buse	6	6
(Belgium) Z Bergs	2	4

Second round
LL	(Argentina) TA Tirante	7^{7}	3	6^{3}
SE	(Germany) J-L Struff	6^{5}	6	7^{7}
(Norway) C Ruud	6	6
9	(Spain) R Jódar	3	4
LL	(Portugal) N Borges	6	6
K Khachanov	3	4
(Peru) I Buse	6	6
4	D Medvedev	4	4

Third round
SE	(Germany) J-L Struff	3	3
(Norway) C Ruud	6	6
LL	(Portugal) N Borges	6	6
(Peru) I Buse	0	2

Quarterfinals
(Norway) C Ruud	7^{7}	6
LL	(Portugal) N Borges	6^{5}	4

==== Section 4 ====
First round
WC	(France) K Jacquet	6^{7}	1
Q	(Czech Republic) T Macháč	7^{9}	6
Q	(Slovakia) A Molčan	4	6	6
WC	(France) T Droguet	6	4	4
Q	(France) B Bonzi	6	3	4
11	(United States) T Fritz	3	6	6
14	(United States) B Nakashima	4	6	6^{8}
(Italy) M Berrettini	6	3	7^{10}
(France) U Humbert	7^{7}	6^{9}	6
(Netherlands) B van de Zandschulp	6^{5}	7^{11}	3
(United States) A Michelsen	6^{5}	6	6
(Czech Republic) J Lehečka	7^{7}	2	4

Second round
6	(France) A Fils	6	7^{7}
Q	(Czech Republic) T Macháč	3	6^{4}
Q	(Slovakia) A Molčan	7^{8}	5	6^{5}
11	(United States) T Fritz	6^{6}	7	7^{7}
(Italy) M Berrettini	7^{7}	7
(France) U Humbert	6^{3}	5
(United States) A Michelsen	6^{4}	3
2	(Spain) C Alcaraz	7^{7}	6

Third round
6	(France) A Fils	3	4
11	(United States) T Fritz	6	6
(Italy) M Berrettini
2	(Spain) C Alcaraz	w/o

Quarterfinals
11	(United States) T Fritz	7^{12}	5	3
2	(Spain) C Alcaraz	6^{10}	7	6

== Qualifying ==
=== Seeds ===
1. (Argentina) Sebastián Báez (qualifying competition, lucky loser)
2. (Netherlands) Tallon Griekspoor (first round)
3. (Argentina) Thiago Agustín Tirante (qualifying competition, lucky loser)
4. (Portugal) Nuno Borges (qualifying competition, lucky loser)
5. (Argentina) Juan Manuel Cerúndolo (qualified)
6. (Paraguay) Adolfo Daniel Vallejo (qualifying competition, lucky loser)
7. (Portugal) Jaime Faria (first round)
8. (Serbia) Miomir Kecmanović (qualifying competition)
9. (Germany) Yannick Hanfmann (qualifying competition)
10. (Germany) Daniel Altmaier (first round)
11. (Czech Republic) Vít Kopřiva (qualifying competition)
12. (Spain) Jaume Munar (first round)
13. (Italy) Mattia Bellucci (qualified)
14. (Spain) Martín Landaluce (first round)

=== Qualifiers ===
1. (Czech Republic) Tomáš Macháč
2. (France) Benjamin Bonzi
3. (Italy) Mattia Bellucci
4. (Slovakia) Alex Molčan
5. (Argentina) Juan Manuel Cerúndolo
6. (Italy) Lorenzo Sonego
7. (Australia) Rinky Hijikata

=== Lucky losers ===
1. (Argentina) Sebastián Báez
2. (Argentina) Thiago Agustín Tirante
3. (Portugal) Nuno Borges
4. (Paraguay) Adolfo Daniel Vallejo

=== Qualifying draw ===
==== First qualifier ====
First round
1	(Argentina) Sebastián Báez	7^{7}	7
Alt	(Bosnia and Herzegovina) Damir Džumhur	6^{4}	5
(Czech Republic) Tomáš Macháč	6	6
14	(Spain) Martín Landaluce	4	3

Qualifying competition
1	(Argentina) Sebastián Báez	2	4
(Czech Republic) Tomáš Macháč	6	6

==== Second qualifier ====
First round
2	(Netherlands) Tallon Griekspoor	3	7^{7}	3
WC	(France) Benjamin Bonzi	6	6^{5}	6
WC	(France) Felix Balshaw	6^{3}	3
9	(Germany) Yannick Hanfmann	7^{7}	6

Qualifying competition
WC	(France) Benjamin Bonzi	7	3	6
9	(Germany) Yannick Hanfmann	5	6	4

==== Third qualifier ====
First round
3	(Argentina) Thiago Agustín Tirante	3	6	6
(United States) Zachary Svajda	6	1	4
(Spain) Pablo Carreño Busta	1	6^{3}
13	(Italy) Mattia Bellucci	6	7^{7}

Qualifying competition
3	(Argentina) Thiago Agustín Tirante	4	4
13	(Italy) Mattia Bellucci	6	6

==== Fourth qualifier ====
First round
4	(Portugal) Nuno Borges	4	6	7
(France) Adrian Mannarino	6	1	5
(Slovakia) Alex Molčan	6	7^{7}
10	(Germany) Daniel Altmaier	4	6^{1}

Qualifying competition
4	(Portugal) Nuno Borges	6^{5}	2
(Slovakia) Alex Molčan	7^{7}	6

==== Fifth qualifier ====
First round
5	(Argentina) Juan Manuel Cerúndolo	7^{7}	6
(United States) Aleksandar Kovacevic	6^{5}	3
(Australia) James Duckworth	4	6	4
8	(Serbia) Miomir Kecmanović	6	2	6

Qualifying competition
5	(Argentina) Juan Manuel Cerúndolo	6	6^{6}	7^{8}
8	(Serbia) Miomir Kecmanović	4	7^{8}	6^{6}

==== Sixth qualifier ====
First round
6	(Paraguay) Adolfo Daniel Vallejo	7^{7}	4	6
WC	(Bulgaria) Grigor Dimitrov	6^{3}	6	3
(Italy) Lorenzo Sonego	6^{3}	6	6
12	(Spain) Jaume Munar	7^{7}	3	4

Qualifying competition
6	(Paraguay) Adolfo Daniel Vallejo	3	6	6^{5}
(Italy) Lorenzo Sonego	6	4	7^{7}

==== Seventh qualifier ====
First round
7	(Portugal) Jaime Faria	3	4
(Australia) Rinky Hijikata	6	6
WC	(France) Hugo Gaston	4	6^{1}
11	(Czech Republic) Vít Kopřiva	6	7^{7}

Qualifying competition
(Australia) Rinky Hijikata	7^{7}	6
11	(Czech Republic) Vít Kopřiva	6^{5}	2
