= 2025 Qatar ExxonMobil Open – Doubles =

Doubles
- 2025 Qatar ExxonMobil Open

Final
- Champions: (United Kingdom) Julian Cash (United Kingdom) Lloyd Glasspool
- Runners-up: (United Kingdom) Joe Salisbury (United Kingdom) Neal Skupski
- Score: 6–3, 6–2

Details
- Draw: 16
- Seeds: 4

Events
Singles	Doubles
- ATP Qatar Open

Julian Cash and Lloyd Glasspool defeated Joe Salisbury and Neal Skupski in the final, 6–3, 6–2 to win the doubles tennis title at the 2025 Qatar ExxonMobil Open. This was the third ATP Tour final between two all-British teams, and the first held outside of the United Kingdom.

Jamie Murray and Michael Venus were the defending champions, but chose not to participate together. Murray partnered John Peers, but they lost in the first round to Marcelo Arévalo and Mate Pavić. Venus partnered Nikola Mektić, but lost in the quarterfinals to Salisbury and Skupski.

This tournament marked the last professional appearance of former singles world No. 7, doubles No. 8 and Tour Finals doubles champion Fernando Verdasco. Partnering Novak Djokovic, they lost in the quarterfinals to Harri Heliövaara and Henry Patten.

== Seeds ==
1. (El Salvador) Marcelo Arévalo / (Croatia) Mate Pavić (quarterfinals)
2. (Finland) Harri Heliövaara / (United Kingdom) Henry Patten (semifinals)
3. (Germany) Kevin Krawietz / (Germany) Tim Pütz (first round)
4. (Italy) Simone Bolelli / (Italy) Andrea Vavassori (first round)

== Draw ==
Key

- Q = Qualifier
- WC = Wild card
- LL = Lucky loser
- Alt = Alternate
- ITF = ITF entry
- PR = Protected ranking
- SR = Special ranking
- SE = Special exempt
- JE = Junior exempt
- JR = Junior Accelerator Programme entrant
- CO = College Accelerator Programme entrant
- NG = Next Gen Accelerator Program entrant
- w/o = Walkover
- r = Retired
- d = Defaulted

=== Draw ===
First round
1	(El Salvador) M Arévalo (Croatia) M Pavić	6	7
(United Kingdom) J Murray (Australia) J Peers	1	5
(India) Y Bhambri (Croatia) I Dodig	6	6
WC	(Spain) D Mérida (Qatar) MS Zayid	3	4
4	(Italy) S Bolelli (Italy) A Vavassori	6^{2}	6^{2}
(India) R Bopanna (Portugal) N Borges	7^{7}	7^{7}
(United Kingdom) J Cash (United Kingdom) L Glasspool	4	6	[10]
Q	(Czech Republic) P Nouza (Czech Republic) P Rikl	6	4	[3]
(Australia) M Ebden (Belgium) J Vliegen	3	6^{3}
(United Kingdom) J Salisbury (United Kingdom) N Skupski	6	7^{7}
(Croatia) N Mektić (New Zealand) M Venus	6	6
3	(Germany) K Krawietz (Germany) T Pütz	4	4
WC	(Serbia) N Djokovic (Spain) F Verdasco	6	6
(Kazakhstan) A Bublik; K Khachanov	1	1
(Netherlands) T Griekspoor (Czech Republic) A Pavlásek	6^{4}	3
2	(Finland) H Heliövaara (United Kingdom) H Patten	7^{7}	6

Quarterfinals
1	(El Salvador) M Arévalo (Croatia) M Pavić	6	3	[8]
(India) Y Bhambri (Croatia) I Dodig	2	6	[10]
(India) R Bopanna (Portugal) N Borges	4	7^{7}	[7]
(United Kingdom) J Cash (United Kingdom) L Glasspool	6	6^{5}	[10]
(United Kingdom) J Salisbury (United Kingdom) N Skupski	4	6	[10]
(Croatia) N Mektić (New Zealand) M Venus	6	3	[5]
WC	(Serbia) N Djokovic (Spain) F Verdasco	5	4
2	(Finland) H Heliövaara (United Kingdom) H Patten	7	6

Semifinals
(India) Y Bhambri (Croatia) I Dodig	6^{3}	3
(United Kingdom) J Cash (United Kingdom) L Glasspool	7^{7}	6
(United Kingdom) J Salisbury (United Kingdom) N Skupski	3	6	[10]
2	(Finland) H Heliövaara (United Kingdom) H Patten	6	3	[5]

Final
(United Kingdom) J Cash (United Kingdom) L Glasspool	6	6
(United Kingdom) J Salisbury (United Kingdom) N Skupski	3	2

== Qualifying ==
=== Seeds ===
1. (Sweden) André Göransson / (Netherlands) Sem Verbeek (first round)
2. (Netherlands) Robin Haase / (Netherlands) Matwé Middelkoop (qualifying competition)

=== Qualifiers ===
1. (Czech Republic) Petr Nouza / (Czech Republic) Patrik Rikl

=== Qualifying draw ===
First round
1	(Sweden) André Göransson (Netherlands) Sem Verbeek	7^{7}	3	[11]
(Czech Republic) Petr Nouza (Czech Republic) Patrik Rikl	6^{5}	6	[13]
WC	(Qatar) Ghanim Al-Sulaiti (Morocco) Mehdi Ziadi	0	0
2	(Netherlands) Robin Haase (Netherlands) Matwé Middelkoop	6	6

Qualifying competition
(Czech Republic) Petr Nouza (Czech Republic) Patrik Rikl	6	6
2	(Netherlands) Robin Haase (Netherlands) Matwé Middelkoop	2	4
