= 2025 Qatar ExxonMobil Open – Singles =

Singles
- 2025 Qatar ExxonMobil Open

Final
- Champion: Andrey Rublev
- Runner-up: (United Kingdom) Jack Draper
- Score: 7–5, 5–7, 6–1

Details
- Draw: 32 (4 Q / 3 WC )
- Seeds: 8

Events
Singles	Doubles
- ATP Qatar Open

Andrey Rublev defeated Jack Draper in the final, 7–5, 5–7, 6–1 to win the singles tennis title at the 2025 Qatar Open. It was his 17th ATP Tour singles title. He saved a match point en route to the title, in the quarterfinals against Alex de Minaur.

Karen Khachanov was the defending champion, but lost in the first round to Daniil Medvedev.

With his first round loss to Matteo Berrettini, this marked the first time that Novak Djokovic lost in the first round of any tournament since the 2016 Summer Olympics.

== Seeds ==
1. (Spain) Carlos Alcaraz (quarterfinals)
2. (Australia) Alex de Minaur (quarterfinals)
3. (Serbia) Novak Djokovic (first round)
4. Daniil Medvedev (quarterfinals, retired)
5. Andrey Rublev (champion)
6. (Greece) Stefanos Tsitsipas (first round)
7. (Bulgaria) Grigor Dimitrov (first round)
8. (United Kingdom) Jack Draper (final)

== Draw ==
Key

- Q = Qualifier
- WC = Wild card
- LL = Lucky loser
- Alt = Alternate
- ITF = ITF entry
- PR = Protected ranking
- SR = Special ranking
- SE = Special exempt
- JE = Junior exempt
- JR = Junior Accelerator Programme entrant
- CO = College Accelerator Programme entrant
- NG = Next Gen Accelerator Program entrant
- w/o = Walkover
- r = Retired
- d = Defaulted

=== Finals ===
Semifinals
(Czech Republic) Jiří Lehečka	6	6^{2}	3
8	(United Kingdom) Jack Draper	3	7^{7}	6
(Canada) Félix Auger-Aliassime	5	6	6^{5}
5	Andrey Rublev	7	4	7^{7}

Final
8	(United Kingdom) Jack Draper	5	7	1
5	Andrey Rublev	7	5	6

=== Top half ===
First round
1	(Spain) C Alcaraz	6	6
PR	(Croatia) M Čilić	4	4
(China) Z Zhang	4	3
Q	(Italy) L Nardi	6	6
(Hungary) F Marozsán	7	6
WC	(Tunisia) A Dougaz	5	3
(Czech Republic) J Lehečka	6	6
7	(Bulgaria) G Dimitrov	4	4
3	(Serbia) N Djokovic	6^{4}	2
(Italy) M Berrettini	7^{7}	6
(Germany) J-L Struff	6^{5}	6^{7}
(Netherlands) T Griekspoor	7^{7}	7^{9}
Q	(Australia) C O'Connell	7^{9}	7^{7}
WC	(Lebanon) H Habib	6^{7}	6^{3}
(Australia) A Popyrin	2	6^{4}
8	(United Kingdom) J Draper	6	7^{7}

Second round
1	(Spain) C Alcaraz	6	4	6
Q	(Italy) L Nardi	1	6	3
(Hungary) F Marozsán	4	2
(Czech Republic) J Lehečka	6	6
(Italy) M Berrettini	7^{7}	6^{6}	6
(Netherlands) T Griekspoor	6^{4}	7^{8}	4
Q	(Australia) C O'Connell	2	1
8	(United Kingdom) J Draper	6	6

Quarterfinals
1	(Spain) C Alcaraz	3	6	4
(Czech Republic) J Lehečka	6	3	6
(Italy) M Berrettini	6	4	3
8	(United Kingdom) J Draper	4	6	6

Semifinals
(Czech Republic) J Lehečka	6	6^{2}	3
8	(United Kingdom) J Draper	3	7^{7}	6

=== Bottom half ===
First round
6	(Greece) S Tsitsipas	6^{6}	7	6^{5}
SE	(Serbia) H Medjedovic	7^{8}	5	7^{7}
Q	(France) Q Halys	6	4	6^{2}
(Canada) F Auger-Aliassime	4	6	7^{7}
(Belgium) Z Bergs	6	7^{7}
(Spain) R Bautista Agut	4	6^{4}
K Khachanov	6	5	3
4	D Medvedev	4	7	6
5	A Rublev	6	6
(Kazakhstan) A Bublik	3	4
LL	(Finland) O Virtanen	6^{6}	3
(Portugal) N Borges	7^{8}	6
Q	(Netherlands) B van de Zandschulp	7	6
WC	(Jordan) A Shelbayh	5	3
R Safiullin	1	5
2	(Australia) A de Minaur	6	7

Second round
SE	(Serbia) H Medjedovic
(Canada) F Auger-Aliassime	w/o
(Belgium) Z Bergs	2	1
4	D Medvedev	6	6
5	A Rublev	6	6
(Portugal) N Borges	3	4
Q	(Netherlands) B van de Zandschulp	4	4
2	(Australia) A de Minaur	6	6

Quarterfinals
(Canada) F Auger-Aliassime	6	0
4	D Medvedev	3	0^{r}
5	A Rublev	6	3	7^{10}
2	(Australia) A de Minaur	1	6	6^{8}

Semifinals
(Canada) F Auger-Aliassime	5	6	6^{5}
5	A Rublev	7	4	7^{7}

== Qualifying ==
=== Seeds ===
1. (France) Quentin Halys (qualified)
2. (Australia) Christopher O'Connell (qualified)
3. (Italy) Luca Nardi (qualified)
4. (Netherlands) Botic van de Zandschulp (qualified)
5. (Finland) Otto Virtanen (qualifying competition, lucky loser)
6. (France) Arthur Cazaux (first round)
7. Pavel Kotov (qualifying competition)
8. (Kazakhstan) Mikhail Kukushkin (qualifying competition)

=== Qualifiers ===
1. (France) Quentin Halys
2. (Australia) Christopher O'Connell
3. (Italy) Luca Nardi
4. (Netherlands) Botic van de Zandschulp

=== Lucky loser ===
1. (Finland) Otto Virtanen

=== Qualifying draw ===
==== First qualifier ====
First round
1	(France) Quentin Halys	6	6
WC	(Qatar) Mubarak Shannan Zayid	4	2
(Switzerland) Stan Wawrinka	7^{7}	6
6	(France) Arthur Cazaux	6^{3}	3

Qualifying competition
1	(France) Quentin Halys	7^{8}	1	6
(Switzerland) Stan Wawrinka	6^{6}	6	3

==== Second qualifier ====
First round
2	(Australia) Christopher O'Connell	6^{3}	7^{7}	6
PR	(Japan) Yosuke Watanuki	7^{7}	6^{4}	3
(Slovakia) Jozef Kovalík	5	6	4
7	Pavel Kotov	7	4	6

Qualifying competition
2	(Australia) Christopher O'Connell	6	6
7	Pavel Kotov	4	2

==== Third qualifier ====
First round
3	(Italy) Luca Nardi	6	6
(Japan) Yasutaka Uchiyama	4	4
WC	(Spain) Daniel Mérida	2	4
8	(Kazakhstan) Mikhail Kukushkin	6	6

Qualifying competition
3	(Italy) Luca Nardi	6	6
8	(Kazakhstan) Mikhail Kukushkin	4	4

==== Fourth qualifier ====
First round
4	(Netherlands) Botic van de Zandschulp	6	2
WC	(Turkey) Ergi Kırkın	1	1^{r}
(France) Térence Atmane	4	5
5	(Finland) Otto Virtanen	6	7

Qualifying competition
4	(Netherlands) Botic van de Zandschulp	6	6
5	(Finland) Otto Virtanen	1	4
