= 2025 Geneva Open – Singles =

Singles
- 2025 Geneva Open

Final
- Champion: (Serbia) Novak Djokovic
- Runner-up: (Poland) Hubert Hurkacz
- Score: 5–7, 7–6^{(7–2)}, 7–6^{(7–2)}

Details
- Draw: 28 (4 Q / 3 WC )
- Seeds: 8

Events
Singles	Doubles
← 2024 ·	Geneva Open	· 2026 →

Novak Djokovic defeated Hubert Hurkacz in the final, 5–7, 7–6^{(7–2)}, 7–6^{(7–2)} to win the singles tennis title at the 2025 Geneva Open. It was his 100th career ATP Tour singles title, joining Jimmy Connors and Roger Federer as the third man in the Open Era to win 100 career singles titles. Aged 38 years and two days old, Djokovic was the third-oldest man to win an ATP Tour singles title (behind Gaël Monfils and Federer).

Casper Ruud was the reigning champion, but withdrew before the tournament began.

== Seeds ==
The top four seeds receive a bye into the second round.

1. (United States) Taylor Fritz (quarterfinals)
2. (Serbia) Novak Djokovic (champion)
3. (Czech Republic) Tomáš Macháč (second round, retired)
4. Karen Khachanov (quarterfinals)
5. (Australia) Alexei Popyrin (quarterfinals)
6. (Poland) Hubert Hurkacz (final)
7. (United States) Alex Michelsen (first round)
8. (Italy) Matteo Arnaldi (quarterfinals)

== Draw ==
=== Key ===
- Q = Qualifier
- WC = Wild card
- LL = Lucky loser
- Alt = Alternate
- ITF = ITF entry
- PR = Protected ranking
- SR = Special ranking
- SE = Special exempt
- JE = Junior exempt
- JR = Junior Accelerator Programme entrant
- CO = College Accelerator Programme entrant
- NG = Next Gen Accelerator Program entrant
- w/o = Walkover
- r = Retired
- d = Defaulted

=== Finals ===
Semifinals
6	(Poland) Hubert Hurkacz	6	6
Q	(Austria) Sebastian Ofner	3	4
Q	(United Kingdom) Cameron Norrie	4	7^{8}	1
2	(Serbia) Novak Djokovic	6	6^{6}	6

Final
6	(Poland) Hubert Hurkacz	7	6^{2}	6^{2}
2	(Serbia) Novak Djokovic	5	7^{7}	7^{7}

=== Top half ===
First round
(Spain) J Munar	6	3	6^{5}
(France) Q Halys	4	6	7^{7}
(France) A Rinderknech	6	6
(Serbia) M Kecmanović	4	2
WC	(France) A Cazaux	3	4
6	(Poland) H Hurkacz	6	6
(Japan) K Nishikori	4	6	6
(United States) L Tien	6	4	4
Q	(Austria) S Ofner	6	6
Q	I Gakhov	1	2
(Portugal) N Borges	4	6	6
7	(United States) A Michelsen	6	3	3

Second round
1	(United States) T Fritz	6	7^{7}
(France) Q Halys	4	6^{5}
(France) A Rinderknech	4	1
6	(Poland) H Hurkacz	6	6
4	K Khachanov	7	2
(Japan) K Nishikori	5	5^{r}
Q	(Austria) S Ofner	7^{7}	7^{7}
(Portugal) N Borges	6^{2}	6^{4}

Quarterfinals
1	(United States) T Fritz	3	6^{5}
6	(Poland) H Hurkacz	6	7^{7}
4	K Khachanov	6	4	4
Q	(Austria) S Ofner	4	6	6

Semifinals
6	(Poland) H Hurkacz	6	6
Q	(Austria) S Ofner	3	4

=== Bottom half ===
First round
5	(Australia) A Popyrin	6	3	7
(Chile) N Jarry	4	6	5
WC	(Serbia) D Lajović	4	1
(United Kingdom) J Fearnley	6	6
Q	(United Kingdom) C Norrie	7^{7}	6
WC	(Switzerland) D Stricker	6^{2}	3
8	(Italy) M Arnaldi	6^{6}	6	6
(France) H Gaston	7^{8}	4	4
Q	(Brazil) K Sell	1	1
(Hungary) F Marozsán	6	6
(Hungary) M Fucsovics	6	6
(Belgium) Z Bergs	2	3

Second round
5	(Australia) A Popyrin	6	6
(United Kingdom) J Fearnley	4	3
Q	(United Kingdom) C Norrie	3	6	4
3	(Czech Republic) T Macháč	6	2	3^{r}
8	(Italy) M Arnaldi	6	7^{7}
(Hungary) F Marozsán	3	6^{3}
(Hungary) M Fucsovics	2	3
2	(Serbia) N Djokovic	6	6

Quarterfinals
5	(Australia) A Popyrin	6^{6}	4
Q	(United Kingdom) C Norrie	7^{8}	6
8	(Italy) M Arnaldi	4	4
2	(Serbia) N Djokovic	6	6

Semifinals
Q	(United Kingdom) C Norrie	4	7^{8}	1
2	(Serbia) N Djokovic	6	6^{6}	6

== Qualifying ==
=== Seeds ===
1. (Australia) James Duckworth (first round)
2. (United Kingdom) Cameron Norrie (qualified)
3. (United States) Reilly Opelka (qualifying competition)
4. (Brazil) Thiago Monteiro (first round)
5. (Australia) Tristan Schoolkate (first round)
6. (Austria) Sebastian Ofner (qualified)
7. (France) Pierre-Hugues Herbert (first round)
8. (United States) Jenson Brooksby (qualifying competition)

=== Qualifiers ===
1. (Brazil) Karuê Sell
2. (United Kingdom) Cameron Norrie
3. (Austria) Sebastian Ofner
4. Ivan Gakhov

=== Qualifying draw ===
==== First qualifier ====
First round
1	(Australia) James Duckworth	6^{3}	4
(Switzerland) Rémy Bertola	7^{7}	6
(Brazil) Karuê Sell	6	4	6
7	(France) Pierre-Hugues Herbert	2	6	4

Qualifying competition
(Switzerland) Rémy Bertola	6	4	4
(Brazil) Karuê Sell	3	6	6

==== Second qualifier ====
First round
2	(United Kingdom) Cameron Norrie	6	6
(Turkey) Ergi Kırkın	1	3
(Moldova) Radu Albot	3	6	2
8	(United States) Jenson Brooksby	6	4	6

Qualifying competition
2	(United Kingdom) Cameron Norrie	6	6
8	(United States) Jenson Brooksby	4	1

==== Third qualifier ====
First round
3	(United States) Reilly Opelka	6	6
(Italy) Enrico Dalla Valle	4	4
WC	(Sweden) Leo Borg	3	5
6	(Austria) Sebastian Ofner	6	7

Qualifying competition
3	(United States) Reilly Opelka	5	6^{2}
6	(Austria) Sebastian Ofner	7	7^{7}

==== Fourth qualifier ====
First round
4	(Brazil) Thiago Monteiro	6	6^{3}	3
Ivan Gakhov	4	7^{7}	6
WC	(Switzerland) Kilian Feldbausch	6	2	6
5	(Australia) Tristan Schoolkate	4	6	4

Qualifying competition
Ivan Gakhov	6	4	7
WC	(Switzerland) Kilian Feldbausch	3	6	5
