= 2025 Hellenic Championship =

- Date: 2–8 November
- Edition: 1st
- Category: ATP 250
- Draw: 28S / 16D
- Surface: Hard - indoor
- Location: Athens, Greece
- Venue: Telekom Center Athens (former OAKA Basketball Arena)

Champions

Singles
- (Serbia) Novak Djokovic

Doubles
- (Portugal) Francisco Cabral / (Austria) Lucas Miedler
- Hellenic Championship

The 2025 Hellenic Championship, also known as the Vanda Pharmaceutical Hellenic Championship for sponsorship reasons, was the inaugural edition of the ATP 250 Hellenic Championship. The event was played on indoor hardcourts at the OAKA Basketball Arena, a multi-purpose venue that was used for the 2004 Summer Olympics, in the Marousi suburb of Athens. It replaced the Belgrade Open on the calendar. The event took place from 2 November to 8 November 2025. First-seeded Novak Djokovic won the singles title.

== Finals ==
=== Singles ===
- (Serbia) Novak Djokovic defeated (Italy) Lorenzo Musetti, 4–6, 6–3, 7–5

=== Doubles ===
- (Portugal) Francisco Cabral / (Austria) Lucas Miedler defeated (Mexico) Santiago González / (Netherlands) David Pel, 4–6, 6–3, [10–3]

== Points and prize money ==
=== Point distribution ===
Event	W	F	SF	QF	R16	R32	R64	Q	Q2	Q1
Singles	250	165	100	50	25	0	—N/a	13	7	0
Doubles	250	150	90	45	20	0	—N/a	—N/a	—N/a	—N/a

=== Prize money ===
Event	W	F	SF	QF	R16	R32	R64	Q2	Q1
Singles	€116,690	€68,035	€39,995	€23,170	€13,455	€8,220	N/A	€4,115	€2,240
Doubles*	€40,560	€21,790	€12,750	€7,070	€4,170	N/A	N/A	N/A	N/A

* per team

== Singles main draw entrants ==
=== Seeds ===
Country	Player	Rank^{1}	Seed
SRB	Novak Djokovic	5	1
ITA	Lorenzo Musetti	8	2
ITA	Luciano Darderi	27	3
USA	Brandon Nakashima	33	4
FRA	Alexandre Müller	44	5
POR	Nuno Borges	46	6
AUS	Alexei Popyrin	47	7
~~HUN~~	~~Fábián Marozsán~~	~~48~~	~~8~~

- Rankings are as of 27 October 2025.

=== Other entrants ===
The following players received wildcards into the singles main draw:

- (Bulgaria) Ivan Ivanov
- (Greece) Stefanos Sakellaridis
- (Switzerland) Stan Wawrinka

The following player received a late entry into the singles main draw:

- (Italy) Lorenzo Musetti

The following players received entry from the qualifying draw:

- (Germany) Yannick Hanfmann
- (United States) Mackenzie McDonald
- (United States) Eliot Spizzirri
- (Germany) Jan-Lennard Struff

The following player received entry as a lucky loser:

- (Czech Republic) Vít Kopřiva

=== Withdrawals ===
- (Argentina) Sebastián Báez → replaced by (United States) Sebastian Korda
- (Spain) Roberto Bautista Agut → replaced by (Bosnia and Herzegovina) Damir Džumhur
- (Brazil) João Fonseca → replaced by (Chile) Alejandro Tabilo
- (Hungary) Márton Fucsovics → replaced by (United States) Reilly Opelka
- Karen Khachanov → replaced by (Netherlands) Botic van de Zandschulp
- (Czech Republic) Jiří Lehečka → replaced by (United Kingdom) Jacob Fearnley
- (Hungary) Fábián Marozsán → replaced by (Czech Republic) Vít Kopřiva
- (Czech Republic) Jakub Menšík → replaced by (Argentina) Tomás Martín Etcheverry
- (Greece) Stefanos Tsitsipas → replaced by (Serbia) Laslo Djere
- (Argentina) Camilo Ugo Carabelli → replaced by (Spain) Pedro Martínez

== Doubles main draw entrants ==
=== Seeds ===
Country	Player	Country	Player	Rank^{1}	Seed
FRA	Sadio Doumbia	FRA	Fabien Reboul	51	1
POR	Francisco Cabral	AUT	Lucas Miedler	58	2
MEX	Santiago González	NED	David Pel	76	3
AUS	John Peers	USA	JJ Tracy	83	4

- Rankings are as of 27 October 2025

=== Other entrants ===
The following pairs received wildcards into the doubles main draw:

- (Greece) Dimitris Sakellaridis / (Greece) Stefanos Sakellaridis
- (Greece) Pavlos Tsitsipas / (Greece) Petros Tsitsipas
