= 2025 Qatar ExxonMobil Open =

- Date: 17–22 February 2025
- Edition: 33rd
- Category: ATP Tour 500
- Draw: 32S/16D
- Surface: Hard / outdoor
- Location: Doha, Qatar
- Venue: Khalifa International Tennis and Squash Complex

Champions

Singles
- Andrey Rublev

Doubles
- (United Kingdom) Julian Cash / (United Kingdom) Lloyd Glasspool
← 2024 ·	Qatar ExxonMobil Open	· 2026 →

The 2025 Qatar Open (also known as 2025 Qatar ExxonMobil Open for sponsorship reasons) was the 33rd edition of the Qatar Open, a men's tennis tournament played on outdoor hard courts. It was part of the ATP Tour 500 tournaments of the 2025 ATP Tour (upgraded from ATP Tour 250 status in previous years), and took place at the Khalifa International Tennis and Squash Complex in Doha, Qatar from 17 to 22 February 2025.

== Champions ==
=== Singles ===
- Andrey Rublev def. (United Kingdom) Jack Draper, 7–5, 5–7, 6–1

=== Doubles ===
- (United Kingdom) Julian Cash / (United Kingdom) Lloyd Glasspool def. (United Kingdom) Joe Salisbury / (United Kingdom) Neal Skupski, 6–3, 6–2

== Singles main-draw entrants ==
=== Seeds ===
Country	Player	Rank^{1}	Seed
ESP	Carlos Alcaraz	3	1
AUS	Alex de Minaur	6	2
SRB	Novak Djokovic	7	3
	Daniil Medvedev	8	4
	Andrey Rublev	10	5
GRE	Stefanos Tsitsipas	11	6
BUL	Grigor Dimitrov	13	7
GBR	Jack Draper	15	8

- ^{1} Rankings are as of 10 February 2025.

=== Other entrants ===
The following players received wildcards into the singles main draw:

- (Tunisia) Aziz Dougaz
- (Lebanon) Hady Habib
- (Jordan) Abdullah Shelbayh

The following player received entry using a protected ranking:

- (Croatia) Marin Čilić

The following player received entry as a special exempt:

- (Serbia) Hamad Medjedovic

The following players received entry from the qualifying draw:

- (France) Quentin Halys
- (Italy) Luca Nardi
- (Australia) Christopher O'Connell
- (Netherlands) Botic van de Zandschulp

The following player received entry as a lucky loser:

- (Finland) Otto Virtanen

=== Withdrawals ===
- (France) Arthur Fils → replaced by (China) Zhang Zhizhen
- (France) Ugo Humbert → replaced by (Finland) Otto Virtanen
- (France) Gaël Monfils → replaced by (Hungary) Fábián Marozsán
- (Italy) Jannik Sinner → replaced by Roman Safiullin
- (Australia) Jordan Thompson → replaced by (Spain) Roberto Bautista Agut

== Doubles main-draw entrants ==
=== Seeds ===
Country	Player	Country	Player	Rank^{1}	Seed
ESA	Marcelo Arévalo	CRO	Mate Pavić	2	1
FIN	Harri Heliövaara	GBR	Henry Patten	7	2
GER	Kevin Krawietz	GER	Tim Pütz	13	3
ITA	Simone Bolelli	ITA	Andrea Vavassori	13	4

- ^{1} Rankings are as of 10 February 2025.

=== Other entrants ===
The following pairs received wildcards into the doubles main draw:

- (Serbia) Novak Djokovic / (Spain) Fernando Verdasco
- (Spain) Daniel Mérida / (Qatar) Mubarak Shannan Zayid

The following pair received entry from the qualifying draw:

- (Czech Republic) Petr Nouza / (Czech Republic) Patrik Rikl

=== Withdrawals ===
- (United States) Nathaniel Lammons / (United States) Jackson Withrow → replaced by (India) Yuki Bhambri / (Croatia) Ivan Dodig
- (Czech Republic) Adam Pavlásek / (Australia) Jordan Thompson → replaced by (Netherlands) Tallon Griekspoor / (Czech Republic) Adam Pavlásek
