= 2025 Geneva Open =

ATP tennis tournament

- Date: 18–24 May
- Edition: 22nd
- Category: ATP Tour 250
- Draw: 28S /16Q /16D
- Surface: Clay
- Location: Geneva, Switzerland
- Venue: Tennis Club de Genève

Champions

Singles
- (Serbia) Novak Djokovic

Doubles
- (France) Sadio Doumbia / (France) Fabien Reboul
- Geneva Open

The 2025 Gonet Geneva Open was an ATP Tour tennis tournament played on outdoor clay courts. It was the 22nd edition of the Geneva Open and part of the ATP Tour 250 series of the 2025 ATP Tour. It took place at the Tennis Club de Genève in Geneva, Switzerland, from 18 to 24 May 2025.

== Champions ==
=== Singles ===
- (Serbia) Novak Djokovic def. (Poland) Hubert Hurkacz, 5–7, 7–6^{(7–2)}, 7–6^{(7–2)}

=== Doubles ===
- (France) Sadio Doumbia / (France) Fabien Reboul def. (Uruguay) Ariel Behar / (Belgium) Joran Vliegen, 6–7^{(4–7)}, 6–4, [11–9]

== Points and prize money ==
=== Point distribution ===
Event	W	F	SF	QF	Round of 16	Round of 32	Q	Q2	Q1
Singles	250	165	100	50	25	0	13	7	0
Doubles	250	150	90	45	0	—N/a	—N/a	—N/a	—N/a

=== Prize money ===
Event	W	F	SF	QF	Round of 16	Round of 32	Q2	Q1
Singles	€90,675	€52,890	€31,090	€18,015	€10,460	€6,390	€3,200	€1,745
Doubles*	€31,530	€16,940	€9,600	€5,500	€3,240	—N/a	—N/a	—N/a

_{*per team}

== Singles main draw entrants ==
=== Seeds ===
Country	Player	Rank^{1}	Seed
USA	Taylor Fritz	4	1
SRB	Novak Djokovic	6	2
CZE	Tomáš Macháč	20	3
	Karen Khachanov	24	4
AUS	Alexei Popyrin	25	5
POL	Hubert Hurkacz	31	6
USA	Alex Michelsen	32	7
ITA	Matteo Arnaldi	37	8

- Rankings are as of 5 May 2025.

=== Other entrants ===
The following players received wildcards into the singles main draw:

- (France) Arthur Cazaux
- (Serbia) Dušan Lajović
- (Switzerland) Dominic Stricker

The following player received a late entry into the singles main draw:

- (Serbia) Novak Djokovic

The following player received an emergency substitution into the singles main draw:

- (Hungary) Márton Fucsovics

The following players received entry from the qualifying draw:

- Ivan Gakhov
- (United Kingdom) Cameron Norrie
- (Austria) Sebastian Ofner
- (Brazil) Karue Sell

=== Withdrawals ===
- (Bulgaria) Grigor Dimitrov → replaced by (United States) Learner Tien
- (Netherlands) Tallon Griekspoor → replaced by (France) Hugo Gaston
- (Norway) Casper Ruud → replaced by (Hungary) Márton Fucsovics
- (Canada) Denis Shapovalov → replaced by (Japan) Kei Nishikori
- (Italy) Lorenzo Sonego → replaced by (France) Arthur Rinderknech
- (Australia) Jordan Thompson → replaced by (Chile) Nicolás Jarry

== Doubles main draw entrants ==
=== Seeds ===
Country	Player	Country	Player	Rank^{1}	Seed
ESA	Marcelo Arévalo	CRO	Mate Pavić	2	1
IND	Yuki Bhambri	USA	Robert Galloway	66	2
AUS	Matthew Ebden	AUS	John Peers	67	3
BRA	Rafael Matos	BRA	Marcelo Melo	76	4

- Rankings are as of 5 May 2025.

=== Other entrants ===
The following pairs received wildcards into the doubles main draw:

- (France) Pierre-Hugues Herbert / (France) Nicolas Mahut
- (Switzerland) Jakub Paul / (Switzerland) Dominic Stricker
