= Lucas Miedler =

Austrian tennis player (born 1996)

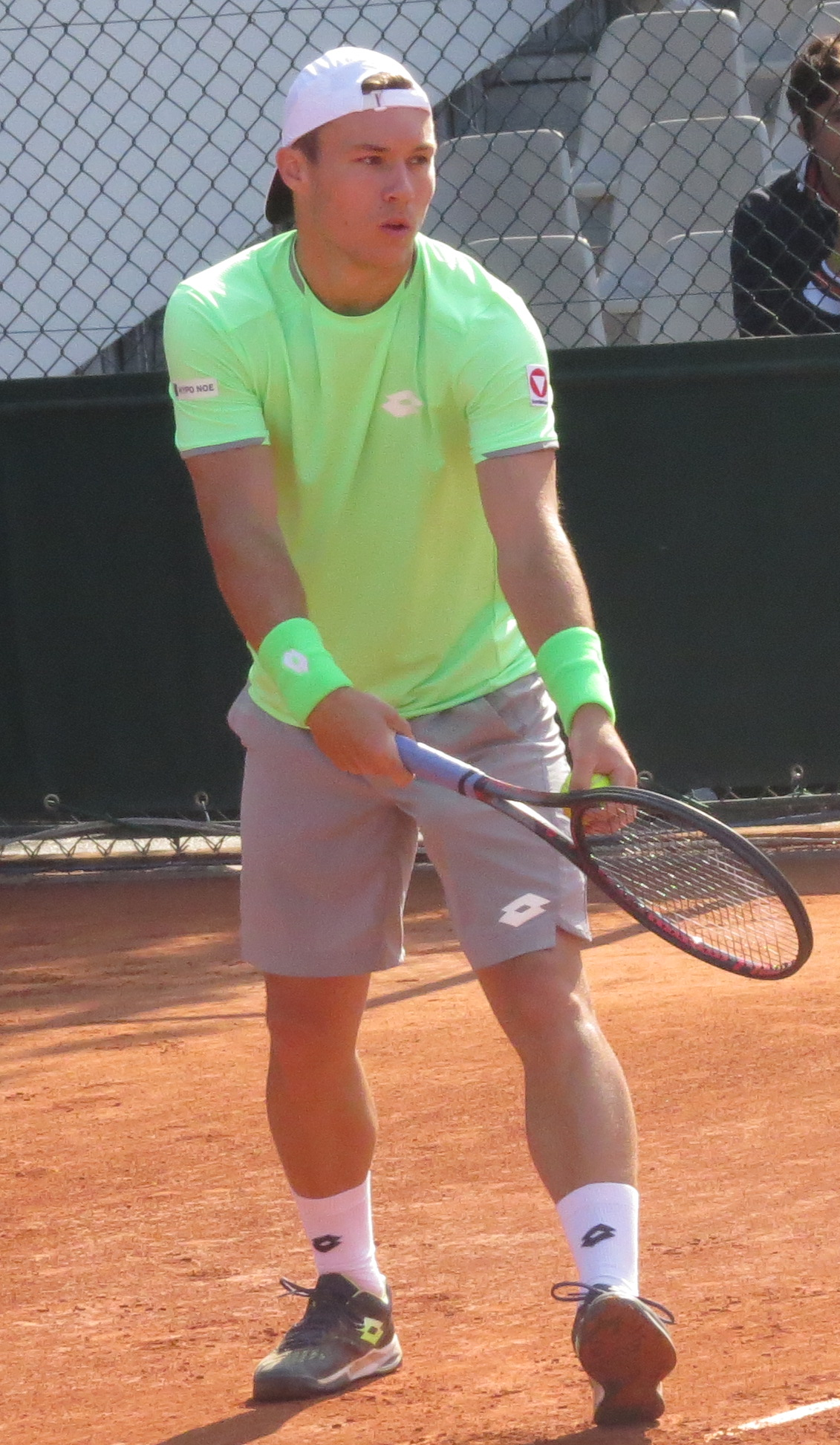
- Miedler at the 2019 French Open
- Country (sports): Austria
- Residence: Tulln, Austria
- Born: 21 June 1996 (age 30) Tulln, Austria
- Height: 1.83 m (6 ft 0 in)
- Turned pro: 2014
- Plays: Right-handed (one handed-backhand)
- Coach: Wolfgang Thiem
- Prize money: US $2,583,669

Singles
- Career record: 1–3 (ATP Tour and Davis Cup)
- Career titles: 0
- Highest ranking: No. 201 (15 October 2018)

Grand Slam singles results
- French Open: Q3 (2019)
- Wimbledon: Q1 (2019)
- US Open: Q1 (2018)

Doubles
- Career record: 158–111 (ATP Tour and Davis Cup)
- Career titles: 15
- Highest ranking: No. 16 (9 November 2026)
- Current ranking: No. 16 (9 November 2026)

Grand Slam doubles results
- Australian Open: 2R (2023, 2025, 2026)
- French Open: 3R (2026)
- Wimbledon: 3R (2026)
- US Open: 3R (2026)

Grand Slam mixed doubles results
- Australian Open: 1R (2026)
- French Open: 2R (2026)
- Wimbledon: 1R (2026)
- Last updated on: 9 November 2026.

Lucas Miedler (German pronunciation: [ˈluːkas ˈmiːdlɐ]; born 21 June 1996) is an Austrian professional tennis player. He has a career-high ATP doubles ranking of world No. 16 achieved on 9 November 2026 and a career high singles ranking of No. 201 achieved on 15 October 2018.

He has won 13 doubles titles on the ATP Tour, seven with compatriot Alexander Erler, at the home tournaments in 2021 and in 2023 Kitzbühel, in 2022 and in 2024 Vienna, as well as in Acapulco, Munich and Antwerp.

== Junior career ==
He won the boys' doubles at the 2014 Australian Open where he partnered with Australian Bradley Mousley, defeating the French duo of Quentin Halys and Johan-Sébastien Tatlot 6–3, 7–6^{(7–3)}.

== Professional career ==
=== 2015: ATP debut ===
In 2015, Miedler made his ATP World Tour main draw debut by qualifying to the first round of the Vienna Open, where he lost in three sets to Latvian Ernests Gulbis.

=== 2021–2022: Maiden ATP and ATP 500 doubles titles ===
At the 2021 Generali Open Kitzbühel, he won the doubles title partnering Alexander Erler.

The Austrian team of Erler/Miedler clinched their second and biggest title on home soil at the ATP 500 2022 Erste Bank Open without dropping a set.

=== 2023: Major, Masters debuts & first wins, ATP 500 title, top 35 ===
At the 2023 Australian Open the pair Miedler/Erler made their Grand Slam debut where they defeated tenth seeds Rohan Bopanna and Matthew Ebden. At the ATP 500 Mexican Open Miedler won his third title with compatriot Erler defeating en route top seeds Wesley Koolhof and Neal Skupski. As a result, Miedler made his top 50 debut on 6 March 2023 at world No. 43. Miedler partnering Cameron Norrie made his Masters debut at the 2023 BNP Paribas Open and won his first match at the Masters 1000 level, defeating seventh seeds Hugo Nys and Jan Zielinski. He also made his debut with Erler at the Masters in Miami.

At the 2023 Grand Prix Hassan II the pair Miedler/Erler reached the final defeating fifth seeds Maxime Cressy and Albano Olivetti. They lost in the final to Andrea Vavassori and Marcelo Demoliner. They won their fourth title at the 2023 BMW Open in Munich, Germany. At the 2023 Generali Open Kitzbühel, they won their fifth doubles title. As a result, he reached the top 35 in the ATP doubles rankings on 14 August 2024.

=== 2024: Two doubles titles with Erler ===
In October, Miedler won back-to-back doubles titles partnering Alexander Erler, claiming the European Open in Antwerp followed by the Vienna Open.

=== 2025–2026: Top 25, six titles with two different partners ===
With new partner Francisco Cabral, Miedler won the 2025 Gstaad Open and the 2025 Hangzhou Open.

In October 2025, Miedler, with Cabral, reached his 14th ATP Tour doubles final at the ATP 500 Erste Bank Open, but lost to Julian Cash and Lloyd Glasspool. Miedler and Cabral closed the 2025 season with a third title in Athens defeating Santiago González and David Pel in the final, ending in the ATP Live Doubles Teams Race in 11th position. As a result, Miedler finished the season ranked in the top 25 at world No. 23 in the ATP doubles rankings on 10 November 2025.

Alongside Cabral, he won the 2026 Brisbane International, defeating top seeds Julian Cash and Lloyd Glasspool in the final.

In July 2026, partnering Marc Polmans, Miedler won the doubles title at the Gstaad Open, defeating Marcelo Demoliner and Robert Galloway in the final. Six days later they overcame Jakob Schnaitter and Mark Wallner in the final to claim the trophy at the Kitzbühel Open.

== Doubles performance timeline ==
Key
W	F	SF	QF	#R	RR	Q#	DNQ	A	NH

(W) winner; (F) finalist; (SF) semifinalist; (QF) quarterfinalist; (#R) rounds 4, 3, 2, 1; (RR) round-robin stage; (Q#) qualification round; (DNQ) did not qualify; (A) absent; (NH) not held; (SR) strike rate (events won / competed); (W–L) win–loss record.
To avoid confusion and double counting, these charts are updated at the conclusion of a tournament or when the player's participation has ended.

Current through the 2025 Hellenic Championship.

Tournament	2015	2016	2017	2018	2019	2020	2021	2022	2023	2024	2025	SR	W–L
Grand Slam tournaments
Australian Open	A	A	A	A	A	A	A	A	2R	1R	2R	0 / 3	2–3
French Open	A	A	A	A	A	A	A	A	1R	2R	1R	0 / 3	1–3
Wimbledon	A	A	A	A	A	NH	A	A	2R	1R	2R	0 / 3	2–3
US Open	A	A	A	A	A	A	A	A	1R	A	2R	0 / 2	1–2
Win–loss	0–0	0–0	0–0	0–0	0–0	0–0	0–0	0–0	2–4	1–3	3–4	0 / 11	6–11
National representation
Davis Cup	A	A	A	A	A	A	A	G1	G1	G1	Q1	0 / 0	6–1
ATP Masters 1000
Indian Wells Open	A	A	A	A	A	NH	A	A	2R	A	A	0 / 1	1–0
Miami Open	A	A	A	A	A	NH	A	A	1R	1R	A	0 / 2	0–2
Madrid Open	A	A	A	A	A	NH	A	A	1R	A	1R	0 / 2	0–2
Italian Open	A	A	A	A	A	A	A	A	1R	A	1R	0 / 2	0–2
Cincinnati Open										A	QF	0 / 1	2–1
Shanghai Masters	A	A	A	A	A	not held			2R	A	1R	0 / 2	1–2
Paris Masters	A	A	A	A	A	A	A	A	2R	A	SF	0 / 2	4–2
Win–loss	0–0	0–0	0–0	0–0	0–0	0–0	0–0	0–0	3–5	0–1	5–5	0 / 12	8–11
Career statistics
Tournaments	0	1	1	1	1	1	2	6	31	20	25	89	
Titles	0	0	0	0	0	0	1	1	3	2	3	10	
Finals	0	0	0	0	0	0	1	1	4	4	5	15	
Overall win–loss	0–0	0–1	0–1	0–1	0–1	0–1	4–1	7–6	34–27	24–18	37–26	106–83	
Year-end ranking	219	242	265	305	229	218	122	56	40	47	24	56%	

== ATP career finals ==
=== Doubles: 21 (15 titles, 6 runner-ups) ===
Legend Grand Slam tournaments (0–0) ATP Tour Masters 1000 (1–0) ATP Tour 500 Series (4–2) ATP Tour 250 Series (10–4)	Finals by surface Hard (9–3) Clay (6–3) Grass (0–0)	Finals by setting Outdoors (10–4) Indoors (5–2)

Result	W–L	Date	Tournament	Tier	Surface	Partner	Opponents	Score
Win	1–0	Jul 2021	Austrian Open Kitzbühel, Austria	ATP 250	Clay	(Austria) Alexander Erler	(Czech Republic) Roman Jebavý (Netherlands) Matwé Middelkoop	7–5, 7–6^{(7–5)}
Win	2–0	Oct 2022	Vienna Open, Austria	ATP 500	Hard (i)	(Austria) Alexander Erler	(Mexico) Santiago González (Argentina) Andrés Molteni	6–3, 7–6^{(7–1)}
Win	3–0	Mar 2023	Mexican Open, Mexico	ATP 500	Hard	(Austria) Alexander Erler	(United States) Nathaniel Lammons (United States) Jackson Withrow	7–6^{(11–9)}, 7–6^{(7–3)}
Loss	3–1	Apr 2023	Grand Prix Hassan II, Morocco	ATP 250	Clay	(Austria) Alexander Erler	(Brazil) Marcelo Demoliner (Italy) Andrea Vavassori	4–6, 6–3, [10–12]
Win	4–1	Apr 2023	Bavarian Championships, Germany	ATP 250	Clay	(Austria) Alexander Erler	(Germany) Kevin Krawietz (Germany) Tim Pütz	6–3, 6–4
Win	5–1	Aug 2023	Austrian Open Kitzbühel, Austria (2)	ATP 250	Clay	(Austria) Alexander Erler	(Ecuador) Gonzalo Escobar (Kazakhstan) Aleksandr Nedovyesov	6–4, 6–4
Loss	5–2	Feb 2024	Rio Open, Brazil	ATP 500	Clay	(Austria) Alexander Erler	(Colombia) Nicolás Barrientos (Brazil) Rafael Matos	4–6, 3–6
Loss	5–3	Apr 2024	Grand Prix Hassan II, Morocco	ATP 250	Clay	(Austria) Alexander Erler	(Finland) Harri Heliövaara (United Kingdom) Henry Patten	6–3, 4–6, [4–10]
Win	6–3	Oct 2024	European Open, Belgium	ATP 250	Hard (i)	(Austria) Alexander Erler	(United States) Robert Galloway (Kazakhstan) Aleksandr Nedovyesov	6–4, 1–6, [10–8]
Win	7–3	Oct 2024	Vienna Open, Austria (2)	ATP 500	Hard (i)	(Austria) Alexander Erler	(United Kingdom) Neal Skupski (New Zealand) Michael Venus	4–6, 6–3, [10–1]
Win	8–3	Jul 2025	Swiss Open Gstaad, Switzerland	ATP 250	Clay	(Portugal) Francisco Cabral	(Germany) Hendrik Jebens (France) Albano Olivetti	6–7^{(4–7)}, 7–6^{(7–4)}, [10–3]
Loss	8–4	Aug 2025	Winston-Salem Open, United States	ATP 250	Hard	(Portugal) Francisco Cabral	(Brazil) Rafael Matos (Brazil) Marcelo Melo	6–4, 4–6, [8–10]
Win	9–4	Sep 2025	Hangzhou Open, China	ATP 250	Hard	(Portugal) Francisco Cabral	(Colombia) Nicolás Barrientos (Netherlands) David Pel	6–4, 6–4
Loss	9–5	Oct 2025	Vienna Open, Austria	ATP 500	Hard (i)	(Portugal) Francisco Cabral	(United Kingdom) Julian Cash (United Kingdom) Lloyd Glasspool	1–6, 6–7^{(6–8)}
Win	10–5	Nov 2025	Hellenic Championship, Greece	ATP 250	Hard (i)	(Portugal) Francisco Cabral	(Mexico) Santiago González (Netherlands) David Pel	4–6, 6–3, [10–3]
Win	11–5	Jan 2026	Brisbane International, Australia	ATP 250	Hard	(Portugal) Francisco Cabral	(United Kingdom) Julian Cash (United Kingdom) Lloyd Glasspool	6–3, 3–6, [10–8]
Win	12–5	Jul 2026	Swiss Open Gstaad, Switzerland (2)	ATP 250	Clay	(Australia) Marc Polmans	(Brazil) Marcelo Demoliner (United States) Robert Galloway	6–4, 6–3
Win	13–5	Jul 2026	Austrian Open Kitzbühel, Austria (3)	ATP 250	Clay	(Australia) Marc Polmans	(Germany) Jakob Schnaitter (Germany) Mark Wallner	6–2, 6–2
Win	14–5	Oct 2026	Shanghai Masters, China	ATP 1000	Hard	(Austria) Neil Oberleitner	(Portugal) Francisco Cabral (United States) JJ Tracy	6–3, 6–4
Loss	14–6	Oct 2026	Almaty Open, Kazakhstan	ATP 250	Hard (i)	(Austria) Neil Oberleitner	(India) Yuki Bhambri (United States) Ryan Seggerman	6–7^{(3–7)}, 7–6^{(7–1)}, [2–10]
Win	15–6	Oct 2026	Vienna Open, Austria (3)	ATP 500	Hard (i)	(Austria) Neil Oberleitner	(United States) Ryan Seggerman (United States) Learner Tien	6–1, 7–5

== ATP Challenger finals ==
=== Singles: 1 (1 runner-up) ===
Result	W–L	Date	Tournament	Surface	Opponent	Score
Loss	0–1	Jul 2018	Winnipeg, Canada	Hard	(Australia) Jason Kubler	1–6, 1–6

=== Doubles: 23 (12 titles, 11 runner-ups) ===
Finals by surface
Hard (5–3)
Clay (7–8)

Result	W–L	Date	Tournament	Surface	Partner	Opponents	Score
Loss	0–1	Aug 2016	Fano, Italy	Clay	(Netherlands) Mark Vervoort	(Italy) Riccardo Ghedin (Italy) Alessandro Motti	4–6, 4–6
Loss	0–2	Jun 2018	Shymkent, Kazakhstan	Clay	(Austria) Sebastian Ofner	(Italy) Lorenzo Giustino (Portugal) Gonçalo Oliveira	2–6, 6–7^{(4–7)}
Loss	0–3	Aug 2018	Portorož, Slovenia	Hard	(Serbia) Nikola Čačić	(Spain) Gerard Granollers Pujol (Czech Republic) Lukáš Rosol	5–7, 3–6
Win	1–3	Apr 2019	León, Mexico	Hard	(Austria) Sebastian Ofner	(Australia) Matt Reid (Australia) John-Patrick Smith	4–6, 6–4, [10–6]
Loss	1–4	Aug 2019	Portorož, Slovenia	Hard	(Austria) Sam Weissborn	(Spain) Carlos Gómez-Herrera (Russia) Teymuraz Gabashvili	3–6, 2–6
Loss	1–5	Oct 2021	Sibiu, Romania	Clay	(Austria) Alexander Erler	(United States) James Cerretani (Switzerland) Luca Margaroli	3–6, 1–6
Loss	1–6	Nov 2021	Ortisei, Italy	Hard (i)	(Austria) Alexander Erler	(Croatia) Antonio Šančić (Austria) Sam Weissborn	6-7^{(8–10)}, 6–4, [8-10]
Win	2–6	Nov 2021	Helsinki, Finland	Hard (i)	(Austria) Alexander Erler	(Finland) Harri Heliövaara (Netherlands) Jean-Julien Rojer	6–3, 7–6^{(7–2)}
Win	3–6	Dec 2021	Forlì, Italy	Hard (i)	(Austria) Alexander Erler	(Italy) Marco Bortolotti (Spain) Sergio Martos Gornés	6-4, 6–2
Win	4–6	Apr 2022	Ostrava, Czech Republic	Clay	(Austria) Alexander Erler	(United States) Hunter Reese (Netherlands) Sem Verbeek	7–6^{(7–5)}, 7–5
Loss	4–7	May 2022	Tunis, Tunisia	Clay	(Austria) Alexander Erler	(Colombia) Nicolás Barrientos (Mexico) Miguel Ángel Reyes-Varela	7-6^{(7–3)}, 3–6, [9-11]
Loss	4–8	Jul 2022	Salzburg, Austria	Clay	(Austria) Alexander Erler	(United States) Nathaniel Lammons (United States) Jackson Withrow	5–7, 7–5, [9-11]
Win	5–8	Jul 2022	Tampere, Finland	Clay	(Austria) Alexander Erler	(Poland) Karol Drzewiecki (Finland) Patrik Niklas-Salminen	7–6^{(7–3)}, 6–1
Win	6–8	Aug 2022	Como, Italy	Clay	(Austria) Alexander Erler	(Jamaica) Dustin Brown (Germany) Julian Lenz	6–1, 7–6^{(7–3)}
Win	7–8	Sep 2022	Tulln an der Donau, Austria	Clay	(Austria) Alexander Erler	(Czech Republic) Zdeněk Kolář (Ukraine) Denys Molchanov	6–3, 6–4
Loss	7–9	Sep 2022	Sibiu, Romania	Clay	(Austria) Alexander Erler	(Serbia) Ivan Sabanov (Serbia) Matej Sabanov	6–3, 5–7, [4–10]
Win	8–9	May 2023	Cagliari, Italy	Clay	(Austria) Alexander Erler	(Argentina) Máximo González (Argentina) Andrés Molteni	7–6^{(8–6)}, 6–3
Win	9–9	Oct 2023	Shenzhen, China	Hard	(Austria) Alexander Erler	(Poland) Piotr Matuszewski (Australia) Matthew Romios	6–3, 6–4
Win	10–9	Nov 2024	Lyon, France	Hard (i)	(United Kingdom) Luke Johnson	(Spain) Sergio Martos Gornés (Austria) David Pichler	6–1, 6–2
Win	11–9	Apr 2025	Madrid, Spain	Clay	(Portugal) Francisco Cabral	(Switzerland) Jakub Paul (Netherlands) David Pel	7–6^{(7–2)}, 6–4
Loss	11–10	Apr 2025	Oeiras, Portugal	Clay	(Portugal) Francisco Cabral	(Poland) Karol Drzewiecki (Poland) Piotr Matuszewski	4–6, 6–3, [8–10]
Loss	11–11	May 2025	Estoril, Portugal	Clay	(Portugal) Francisco Cabral	(Uruguay) Ariel Behar (Belgium) Joran Vliegen	5–7, 3–6
Win	12–11	May 2025	Bordeaux, France	Clay	(Portugal) Francisco Cabral	(India) Yuki Bhambri (United States) Robert Galloway	7–6^{(7–1)}, 7–6^{(7–2)}

== ITF Futures/World Tennis Tour finals ==
=== Singles: 23 (10–13) ===
Result	W–L	Date	Tournament	Surface	Opponent	Score
Loss	0–1	May 2015	Turkey F17, Antalya	Hard	(Germany) Peter Heller	3–6, 6–1, 3–6
Loss	0–2	May 2015	Turkey F18, Antalya	Hard	(Italy) Riccardo Bellotti	3–6, 4–6
Loss	0–3	Jun 2015	Slovenia F1, Maribor	Clay	(Russia) Kirill Dmitriev	4–6, 1–6
Loss	0–4	Aug 2015	Austria F9, Pörtschach	Clay	(Austria) Bastian Trinker	4–6, 3–6
Win	1–4	Nov 2015	South Africa F2, Stellenbosch	Hard	(South Africa) Lloyd Harris	7–6^{(7–4)}, 6–1
Loss	1–5	Nov 2015	South Africa F3, Stellenbosch	Hard	(South Africa) Lloyd Harris	2–6, 1–6
Loss	1–6	Oct 2016	Norway F1, Oslo	Hard (i)	(Italy) Lorenzo Frigerio	6–4, 3–6, 3–6
Win	2–6	Oct 2016	Norway F2, Oslo	Hard (i)	(Italy) Gianluigi Quinzi	6–2, 6–4
Win	3–6	Nov 2016	Cyprus F1, Nicosia	Hard	(Czech Republic) David Poljak	6–3, 6–3
Loss	3–7	Nov 2016	Cyprus F2, Limassol	Hard	(France) Alexandre Müller	2–6, 2–6
Loss	3–8	Dec 2016	Cyprus F3, Larnaca	Hard	(Austria) Maximilian Neuchrist	6–7^{(3–7)}, 3–6
Loss	3–9	Mar 2017	Portugal F2, Faro	Hard	(Belgium) Yannick Mertens	4–6, 2–6
Win	4–9	Apr 2017	Qatar F3, Doha	Hard	(Belgium) Jonas Merckx	6–3, 6–3
Loss	4–10	Jun 2017	Tunisia F24, Hammamet	Clay	(Spain) Sergio Gutiérrez Ferrol	5–7, 4–6
Win	5–10	Feb 2018	Egypt F6, Sharm El Sheikh	Hard	(South Africa) Lloyd Harris	6–3, 0–6, 6–2
Win	6–10	Mar 2018	Egypt F8, Sharm El Sheikh	Hard	(Egypt) Karim-Mohamed Maamoun	6–3, 6–4
Win	7–10	Apr 2018	Egypt F11, Sharm El Sheikh	Hard	(Russia) Teymuraz Gabashvili	6–3, 7–5
Loss	7–11	Apr 2018	Egypt F12, Sharm El Sheikh	Hard	(Russia) Teymuraz Gabashvili	2–6, 3–6
Loss	7–12	Apr 2018	Egypt F13, Sharm El Sheikh	Hard	(Spain) Andrés Artuñedo	6–0, 6–7^{(7–9)}, 3–6
Win	8–12	Jun 2018	Spain F16, Palma del Río	Hard	(Norway) Viktor Durasovic	6–2, 7–6^{(8–6)}
Win	9–12	Aug 2020	M15 Anif, Austria	Clay	(Germany) Peter Heller	6–1, 7–5
Win	10–12	Mar 2021	M15 Sharm El Sheikh, Egypt	Hard	(Japan) Makoto Ochi	6–3, 7–6^{(7–3)}
Loss	10–13	Mar 2022	M25 Loule, Portugal	Hard	(Hungary) Fábián Marozsán	7–6^{(8–6)}, 1–6, 3–6

=== Doubles: 45 (30–15) ===
Result	W–L	Date	Tournament	Surface	Partner	Opponents	Score
Win	1–0	Nov 2014	Turkey F42, Antalya	Hard	(Austria) Sam Weissborn	(Switzerland) Antoine Bellier (Switzerland) Adrian Bodmer	7–5, 6–1
Win	2–0	Jan 2015	Turkey F3, Antalya	Hard	(Austria) Maximilian Neuchrist	(China) Li Zhe (South Africa) Ruan Roelofse	6–4, 6–4
Loss	2–1	Feb 2015	Egypt F6, Sharm El Sheikh	Hard	(Austria) Maximilian Neuchrist	(Turkey) Cem İlkel (Turkey) Anıl Yüksel	7–6^{(7–1)}, 3–6, [7–10]
Win	3–1	Mar 2015	Egypt F7, Sharm El Sheikh	Hard	(Austria) Maximilian Neuchrist	(Ukraine) Dmytro Badanov (Russia) Dmitry Surchenko	6–1, 6–2
Loss	3–2	Apr 2015	Egypt F13, Sharm El Sheikh	Hard	(Russia) Markos Kalovelonis	(Austria) Martin Fischer (Switzerland) Jannis Liniger	4–6, 2–6
Win	4–2	May 2015	Turkey F17, Antalya	Hard	(Austria) Maximilian Neuchrist	(Switzerland) Antoine Bellier (France) Hugo Nys	4–6, 6–3, [10–7]
Win	5–2	May 2015	Turkey F18, Antalya	Hard	(Austria) Maximilian Neuchrist	(France) Benjamin Bonzi (France) Fabien Reboul	6–2, 6–3
Loss	5–3	Jun 2015	Slovenia F2, Ljubljana	Clay	(Austria) Maximilian Neuchrist	(Ukraine) Danylo Kalenichenko (Portugal) Gonçalo Oliveira	5–7, 6–7
Win	6–3	Jul 2015	Czech Republic F5, Ústí nad Orlicí	Clay	(Austria) Maximilian Neuchrist	(Poland) Paweł Ciaś (Poland) Adam Majchrowicz	7–6^{(7–3)}, 6–4
Win	7–3	Jul 2015	Austria F4, Kramsach	Clay	(Austria) Maximilian Neuchrist	(Argentina) Federico Coria (Chile) Cristóbal Saavedra Corvalán	4–6, 6–2, [10–8]
Win	8–3	Jul 2015	Austria F5, Bad Waltersdorf	Clay	(Slovenia) Tom Kočevar-Dešman	(Austria) Philip Lang (Austria) Sebastian Ofner	6–2, 6–2
Win	9–3	Aug 2015	Austria F7, Innsbruck	Clay	(Austria) Pascal Brunner	(Austria) Lukas Jastraunig (Austria) Philip Lang	6–2, 6–4
Win	10–3	Aug 2015	Austria F8, Vogau	Clay	(Switzerland) Luca Margaroli	(Austria) Pascal Brunner (Russia) Kirill Dmitriev	7–6^{(7–4)}, 5–7, [10–5]
Win	11–3	Aug 2015	Austria F9, Pörtschach	Clay	(Russia) Kirill Dmitriev	(Germany) Kevin Krawietz (Switzerland) Luca Margaroli	6–2, 7–5
Win	12–3	Sep 2015	Austria F10, St. Pölten	Clay	(Austria) Sam Weissborn	(Austria) Pascal Brunner (Austria) Dennis Novak	6–3, 6–3
Loss	12–4	Oct 2015	Turkey F40, Antalya	Hard	(Austria) Pascal Brunner	(Italy) Enrico Dalla Valle (Italy) Julian Ocleppo	3–6, 5–7
Win	13–4	Nov 2015	South Africa F1, Stellenbosch	Hard	(Austria) Pascal Brunner	(South Africa) Chris Haggard (United States) Tyler Hochwalt	6–3, 6–2
Win	14–4	Nov 2015	South Africa F2, Stellenbosch	Hard	(Austria) Pascal Brunner	(Austria) Peter Goldsteiner (France) Quentin Robert	6–4, 6–2
Loss	14–5	Nov 2015	South Africa F3, Stellenbosch	Hard	(Austria) Pascal Brunner	(Italy) Fabio Mercuri (Italy) Luca Pancaldi	4–6, 6–4, [8–10]
Win	15–5	Mar 2016	Israel F6, Ramat HaSharon	Hard	(Italy) Gianluigi Quinzi	(Georgia (country)) Aleksandre Metreveli (Ukraine) Volodymyr Uzhylovskyi	6–1, 4–6, [10–5]
Win	16–5	Apr 2016	Hungary F1, Szeged	Clay	(Italy) Gianluigi Quinzi	(Slovenia) Aljaž Radinski (Slovenia) Tomislav Ternar	7–6^{(7–5)}, 6–2
Win	17–5	May 2016	Bosnia & Herzegovina F2, Brčko	Clay	(Austria) David Pichler	(Canada) Frank Dancevic (Serbia) Nebojša Perić	6–2, 4–6, [10–6]
Win	18–5	Sep 2016	Austria F8, St. Pölten	Clay	(Austria) Lenny Hampel	(South Africa) Damon Gooch (Austria) Gregor Ramskogler	6–3, 6–3
Win	19–5	Sep 2016	Hungary F5, Székesfehérvár	Clay	(Austria) Pascal Brunner	(Hungary) Gábor Borsos (Hungary) Ádám Kellner	6–3, 3–6, [10–1]
Win	20–5	Oct 2016	Croatia F8, Solin	Clay	(Austria) Pascal Brunner	(Ukraine) Filipp Kekercheni (Austria) David Pichler	6–2, 7–6^{(11–9)}
Win	21–5	Oct 2016	Croatia F9, Bol	Clay	(Austria) Pascal Brunner	(Slovenia) Nik Razboršek (Croatia) Nino Serdarušić	6–2, 6–2
Win	22–5	Oct 2016	Norway F1, Oslo	Hard (i)	(Norway) Viktor Durasovic	(Sweden) David Norfeldt (Sweden) Robin Thour	6–1, 6–1
Loss	22–6	Nov 2016	Norway F3, Oslo	Hard (i)	(Italy) Gianluigi Quinzi	(Canada) Martin Beran (Slovakia) Filip Horanský	3–6, 6–2, [4–10]
Loss	22–7	Nov 2016	Cyprus F1, Nicosia	Hard	(Austria) Pascal Brunner	(Norway) Fredrik Ask (Belgium) Omar Salman	6–4, 5–7, [8–10]
Win	23–7	Nov 2016	Cyprus F2, Limassol	Hard	(Austria) Pascal Brunner	(United Kingdom) Oliver Hudson (United Kingdom) Keelan Oakley	6–4, 6–2
Win	24–7	Dec 2016	Cyprus F3, Larnaca	Hard	(Austria) Maximilian Neuchrist	(Russia) Markos Kalovelonis (France) Alexandre Müller	6–3, 1–6, [10–5]
Loss	24–8	Mar 2017	Portugal F1, Vale do Lobo	Hard	(Norway) Viktor Durasovic	(Italy) Erik Crepaldi (Portugal) Gonçalo Oliveira	6–1, 2–6, [5–10]
Win	25–8	Mar 2017	Portugal F2, Faro	Hard	(United Kingdom) James Marsalek	(Switzerland) Antoine Bellier (Ukraine) Marat Deviatiarov	5–7, 6–1, [10–6]
Loss	25–9	Apr 2017	Qatar F2, Doha	Hard	(Germany) Daniel Altmaier	(Sweden) Markus Eriksson (Sweden) Milos Sekulic	5–7, 6–3, [7–10]
Win	26–9	Jun 2017	Tunisia F23, Hammamet	Clay	(Austria) Maximilian Neuchrist	(France) Florian Lakat (France) Arthur Rinderknech	7–6^{(7–2)}, 5–7, [14–12]
Loss	26–10	Mar 2018	Egypt F7, Sharm El Sheikh	Hard	(Belgium) Clement Geens	(Guatemala) Christopher Díaz Figueroa (Guatemala) Wilfredo González	4–6, 6–1, [8–10]
Win	27–10	Mar 2018	Egypt F10, Sharm El Sheikh	Hard	(Ukraine) Vladyslav Manafov	(Czech Republic) Petr Hájek (Brazil) Igor Marcondes	6–0, 6–2
Win	28–10	Apr 2018	Egypt F11, Sharm El Sheikh	Hard	(United States) Peter Kobelt	(Brazil) Igor Marcondes (Ukraine) Vladyslav Orlov	7–6^{(7–5)}, 6–4
Win	29–10	Apr 2018	Egypt F12, Sharm El Sheikh	Hard	(Russia) Teymuraz Gabashvili	(Ukraine) Marat Deviatiarov (Ukraine) Vladyslav Manafov	6–4, 6–0
Loss	29–11	Apr 2018	Egypt F13, Sharm El Sheikh	Hard	(Austria) Peter Goldsteiner	(France) Tom Jomby (France) Mick Lescure	4–6, 4–6
Loss	29–12	Aug 2020	M15 Anif, Austria	Clay	(Austria) Neil Oberleitner	(Germany) Fabian Fallert (Germany) Peter Heller	6–7^{(3–7)}, 7–5, [9-11]
Loss	29–13	Sep 2020	M25 Prague, Czech Republic	Clay	(Poland) Jan Zieliński	(Argentina) Sebastián Báez (Argentina) Pedro Cachin	6–7^{(4–7)}, 1–6
Win	30–13	Nov 2020	M15 Heraklion, Greece	Hard	(Austria) Neil Oberleitner	(Netherlands) Gijs Brouwer (Netherlands) Mick Veldheer	6–4, 6–2
Loss	30–14	Nov 2020	M15 Heraklion, Greece	Hard	(Austria) Neil Oberleitner	(Germany) Timo Stodder (Germany) Robert Strombachs	4–6, 4–6
Loss	30–15	Mar 2021	M15 Sharm El Sheikh, Egypt	Hard	(Bosnia and Herzegovina) Aldin Šetkić	(Italy) Jacopo Berrettini (Italy) Francesco Vilardo	2–6, 7–6^{(7–1)}, [8–10]
