= 2025 Hellenic Championship – Singles =

Singles
- 2025 Hellenic Championship

Final
- Champion: (Serbia) Novak Djokovic
- Runner-up: (Italy) Lorenzo Musetti
- Score: 4–6, 6–3, 7–5

Details
- Draw: 28 (4 Q / 3 WC)
- Seeds: 8

Events
Singles	Doubles
- Hellenic Championship

Novak Djokovic defeated Lorenzo Musetti in the final, 4–6, 6–3, 7–5 to win the singles tennis title at the 2025 Hellenic Championship. It was his 101st career ATP Tour-level title and his 72nd title won on hardcourts, breaking a tie with Roger Federer. Aged 38 years and 5 months old, Djokovic became the oldest men's singles champion on the ATP Tour since its establishment in 1990, and the third-oldest men's singles tour-level champion in the Open Era.

This was the first edition of the tournament, which replaced the Belgrade Open on the calendar.

== Seeds ==
The top four seeds received a bye into the second round.

1. (Serbia) Novak Djokovic (champion)
2. (Italy) Lorenzo Musetti (final)
3. (Italy) Luciano Darderi (second round)
4. (United States) Brandon Nakashima (second round)
5. (France) Alexandre Müller (quarterfinals)
6. (Portugal) Nuno Borges (quarterfinals)
7. (Australia) Alexei Popyrin (first round)
8. (Hungary) Fábián Marozsán (withdrew)

== Draw ==
Key

- Q = Qualifier
- WC = Wild card
- LL = Lucky loser
- Alt = Alternate
- ITF = ITF entry
- PR = Protected ranking
- SR = Special ranking
- SE = Special exempt
- JE = Junior exempt
- JR = Junior Accelerator Programme entrant
- CO = College Accelerator Programme entrant
- NG = Next Gen Accelerator Program entrant
- w/o = Walkover
- r = Retired
- d = Defaulted

=== Finals ===
Semifinals
1	(Serbia) Novak Djokovic	6	6
Q	(Germany) Yannick Hanfmann	3	4
(United States) Sebastian Korda	0	7	5
2	(Italy) Lorenzo Musetti	6	5	7

Final
1	(Serbia) Novak Djokovic	4	6	7
2	(Italy) Lorenzo Musetti	6	3	5

=== Top half ===
First round
(Chile) A Tabilo	7^{9}	6^{6}	7
(Australia) A Walton	6^{7}	7^{8}	5
Q	(United States) E Spizzirri	1	7^{8}	6
(Serbia) L Djere	6	6^{6}	2
WC	(Greece) S Sakellaridis	6^{4}	3
6	(Portugal) N Borges	7^{7}	6
(United States) M Giron	6	6
(Spain) P Martínez	4	1
Q	(Germany) Y Hanfmann	6	6
WC	(Bulgaria) I Ivanov	4	2
(United States) R Opelka	4	3
LL	(Czech Republic) V Kopřiva	6	6

Second round
1	(Serbia) N Djokovic	7^{7}	6
(Chile) A Tabilo	6^{3}	1
Q	(United States) E Spizzirri	7	3	4
6	(Portugal) N Borges	5	6	6
4	(United States) B Nakashima	6^{7}	1
(United States) M Giron	7^{9}	6
Q	(Germany) Y Hanfmann	6	5	7
LL	(Czech Republic) V Kopřiva	2	7	5

Quarterfinals
1	(Serbia) N Djokovic	7^{7}	6
6	(Portugal) N Borges	6^{1}	4
(United States) M Giron	6^{3}	4
Q	(Germany) Y Hanfmann	7^{7}	6

Semifinals
1	(Serbia) N Djokovic	6	6
Q	(Germany) Y Hanfmann	3	4

=== Bottom half ===
First round
7	(Australia) A Popyrin	6	3	4
(United States) S Korda	4	6	6
(Bosnia and Herzegovina) D Džumhur	6	6
(United Kingdom) J Fearnley	4	2
(Serbia) M Kecmanović	7^{7}	7^{7}
(Poland) K Majchrzak	6^{4}	6^{4}
5	(France) A Müller	6	2	7^{8}
Q	(Germany) J-L Struff	3	6	6^{6}
Q	(United States) M McDonald	7^{7}	6^{3}	3
(Argentina) TM Etcheverry	6^{5}	7^{7}	6
WC	(Switzerland) S Wawrinka	2	7^{7}	7
(Netherlands) B van de Zandschulp	6	6^{5}	5

Second round
(United States) S Korda	4	6	6
(Bosnia and Herzegovina) D Džumhur	6	3	3
(Serbia) M Kecmanović	4	6	6
3	(Italy) L Darderi	6	2	3
5	(France) A Müller	6^{2}	7^{7}	7^{7}
(Argentina) TM Etcheverry	7^{7}	6^{4}	6^{3}
WC	(Switzerland) S Wawrinka	6	6^{5}	4
2	(Italy) L Musetti	4	7^{7}	6

Quarterfinals
(United States) S Korda	6	6
(Serbia) M Kecmanović	3	2
5	(France) A Müller	2	4
2	(Italy) L Musetti	6	6

Semifinals
(United States) S Korda	0	7	5
2	(Italy) L Musetti	6	5	7

== Qualifying ==
=== Seeds ===
1. (Austria) Filip Misolic (first round)
2. (Germany) Jan-Lennard Struff (qualified)
3. (Czech Republic) Vít Kopřiva (qualifying competition, lucky loser)
4. (Japan) Shintaro Mochizuki (qualifying competition)
5. (United States) Eliot Spizzirri (qualified)
6. (Argentina) Thiago Agustín Tirante (first round)
7. (United States) Mackenzie McDonald (qualified)
8. (Slovakia) Lukáš Klein (first round)

=== Qualifiers ===
1. (Germany) Yannick Hanfmann
2. (Germany) Jan-Lennard Struff
3. (United States) Eliot Spizzirri
4. (United States) Mackenzie McDonald

=== Lucky loser ===
1. (Czech Republic) Vít Kopřiva

=== Qualifying draw ===
==== First qualifier ====
First round
1	(Austria) Filip Misolic	3	7^{7}	1
(Slovakia) Alex Molčan	6	6^{3}	6
(Germany) Yannick Hanfmann	6	6
8	(Slovakia) Lukáš Klein	2	4

Qualifying competition
(Slovakia) Alex Molčan	6^{2}	3
(Germany) Yannick Hanfmann	7^{7}	6

==== Second qualifier ====
First round
2	(Germany) Jan-Lennard Struff	7^{7}	7
(Estonia) Mark Lajal	6^{1}	5
WC	(Switzerland) Henry Bernet	7	6
6	(Argentina) Thiago Agustín Tirante	5	4

Qualifying competition
2	(Germany) Jan-Lennard Struff	4	6	6
WC	(Switzerland) Henry Bernet	6	4	3

==== Third qualifier ====
First round
3	(Czech Republic) Vít Kopřiva	6	6
(Portugal) Jaime Faria	3	2
(Chinese Taipei) Tseng Chun-hsin	1	3
5	(United States) Eliot Spizzirri	6	6

Qualifying competition
3	(Czech Republic) Vít Kopřiva	6	5	2
5	(United States) Eliot Spizzirri	4	7	6

==== Fourth qualifier ====
First round
4	(Japan) Shintaro Mochizuki	6	6
WC	(Greece) Pavlos Tsitsipas	1	2
(Argentina) Marco Trungelliti	6	2	5
7	(United States) Mackenzie McDonald	2	6	7

Qualifying competition
4	(Japan) Shintaro Mochizuki	6	2	2
7	(United States) Mackenzie McDonald	4	6	6
