= Hellenic Championship (tennis) =

Tournament information
- Tour: ATP Tour
- Founded: 2025
- Editions: 1
- Location: Athens; Greece
- Venue: Telekom Center Athens
- Category: ATP 250
- Surface: Hardcourt (i)
- Draw: 28S/16D
- Prize money: €766,715 (2025)
- Website: hellenicchampionship.com

Current champions (2025)
- Singles: (Serbia) Novak Djokovic
- Doubles: (Portugal) Francisco Cabral (Austria) Lucas Miedler

The Hellenic Championship, sponsored by Vanda Pharmaceuticals, is an ATP 250 tournament held in Greece. The event is played on indoor hardcourts at the Telekom Center Athens, a multi-purpose venue in Athens that was used for the 2004 Summer Olympics. It made its debut in November 2025, replacing the Belgrade Open.

== Results ==
=== Singles ===
Year	Champions	Runners-up	Score
2025	(Serbia) Novak Djokovic	(Italy) Lorenzo Musetti	4–6, 6–3, 7–5
2026	Not held		

=== Doubles ===
Year	Champions	Runners-up	Score
2025	(Portugal) Francisco Cabral (Austria) Lucas Miedler	(Mexico) Santiago González (Netherlands) David Pel	4–6, 6–3, [10–3]
2026	Not held		
