= Alcaraz–Sinner rivalry =

Tennis rivalry since 2021

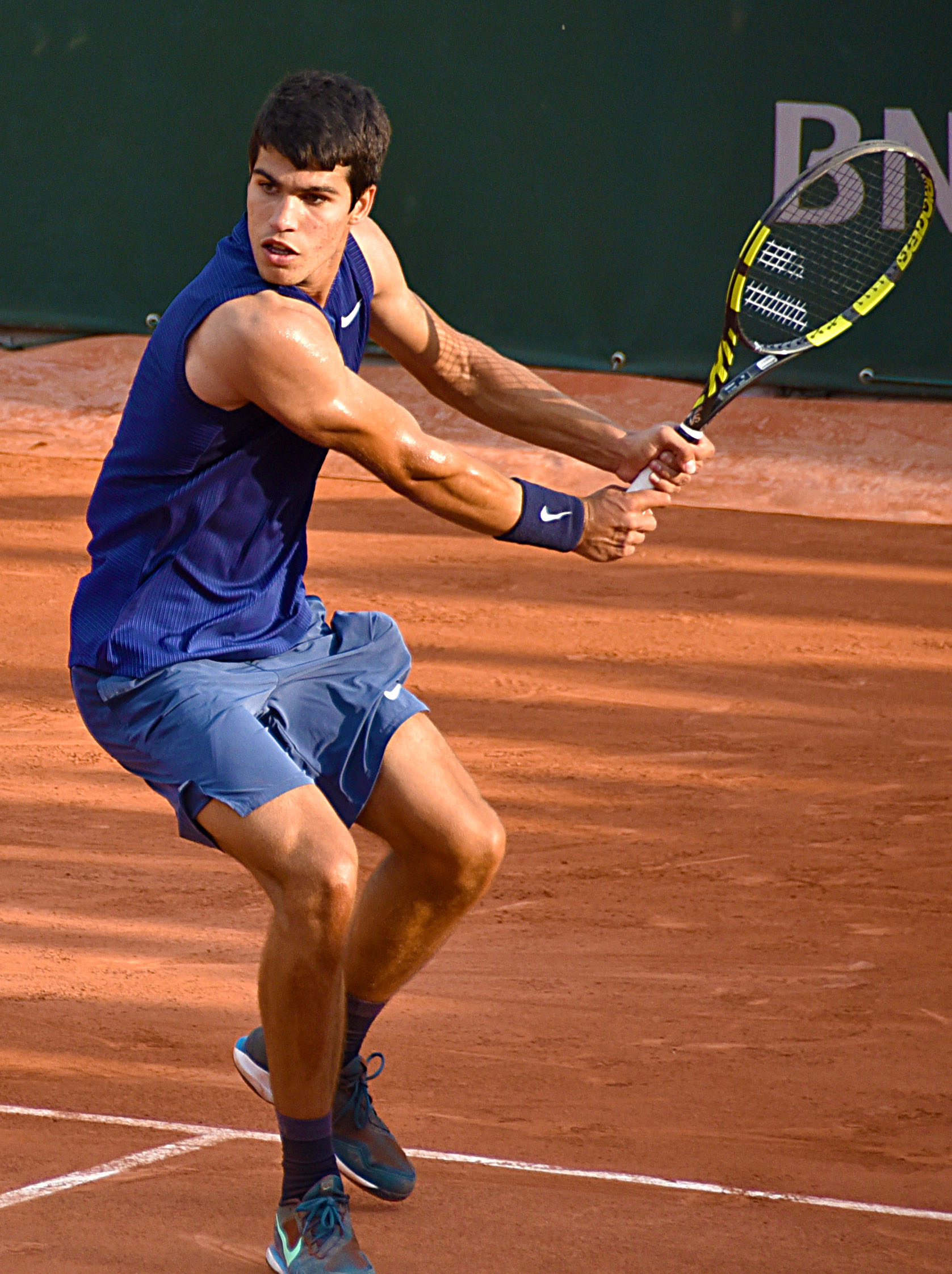
Carlos Alcaraz

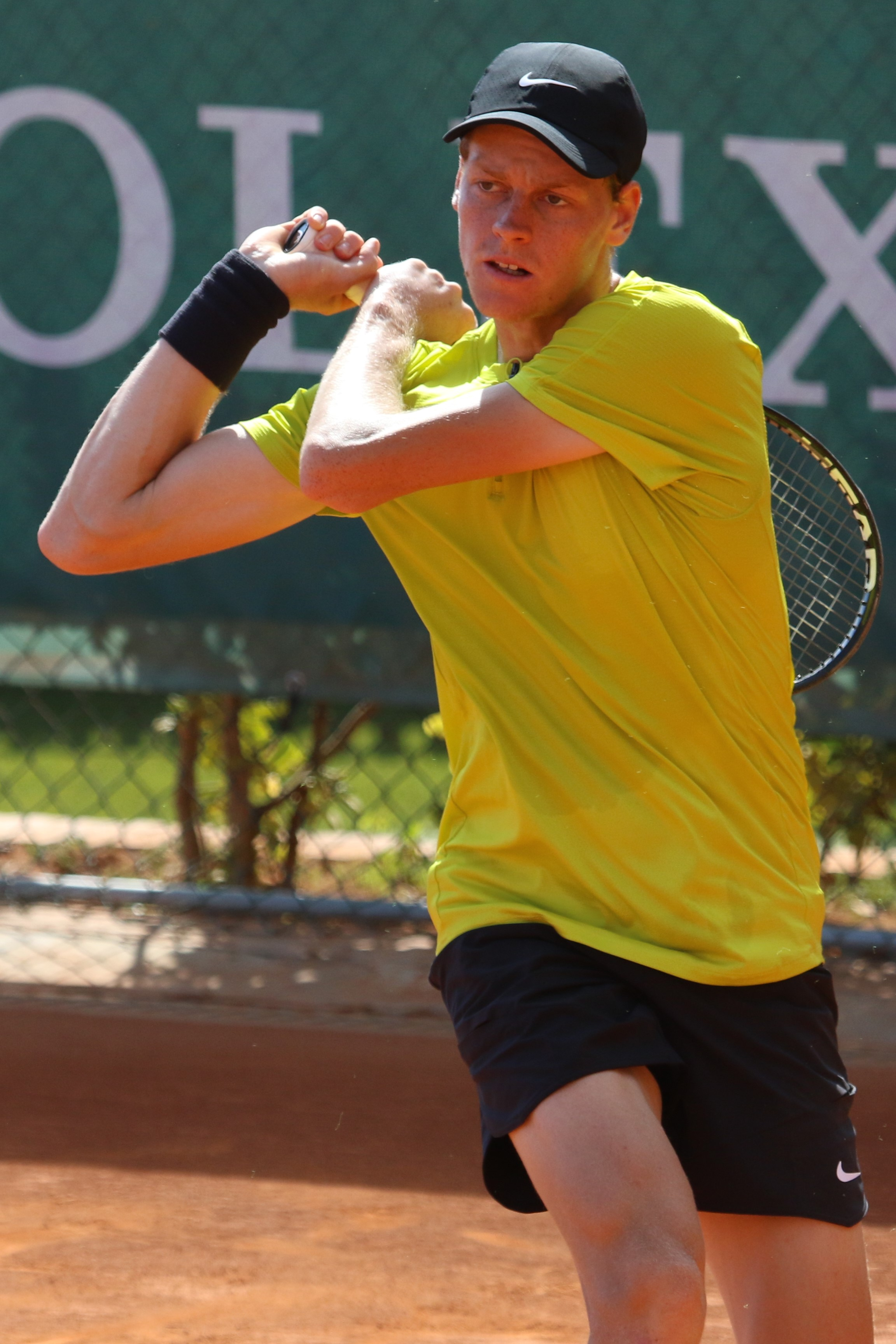
Jannik Sinner

The tennis rivalry between Carlos Alcaraz and Jannik Sinner emerged in the early 2020s. Colloquially referred to by the media and fans as "Sincaraz", a portmanteau of their names, the pair have faced each other 17 times since 2021, with Alcaraz leading the rivalry 10–7, including 4–2 at the majors and 5–4 in finals. Alcaraz leads their five-set encounters 3–0.

Alcaraz and Sinner are the two most successful men's tennis players born in the 21st century. Both have won multiple major titles—Alcaraz seven and Sinner five—and both have held the world No. 1 ranking. Some commentators have dubbed them the "New Two" or the "Big Two", in reference to the Big Three. Between them, they have won twelve of the last seventeen major titles dating back to the 2022 US Open.

The rivalry has been described as "potentially era-defining". They have played multiple matches regarded as classics, including their 2022 US Open quarterfinal and the 2025 French Open final.

== History ==
Before playing an ATP Tour-level match, Alcaraz and Sinner played a Challenger match at the JC Ferrero Open in 2019, won by Alcaraz as a 15-year-old in his first match at that level. Challenger-level matches are not officially counted towards head-to-head tallies.

=== 2021 ===
I am so happy for this win as Jannik was fighting for a spot at the Nitto ATP Finals. It's my third top 10 win of the year. I think Jannik and I will have a great rivalry in the future.

— Carlos Alcaraz, following his first ATP Tour match against Jannik Sinner

Alcaraz and Sinner met for the first time at the ATP Tour level at the 2021 Paris Masters, where an 18-year-old Alcaraz, ranked world No. 35, upset a 20-year-old Sinner in straight sets. This match significantly bumped Sinner out of the qualifying positions for the ATP Finals, where he had been hoping to make his first appearance as a seed.

=== 2022 ===
Alcaraz and Sinner met three times in 2022, with Sinner winning two matches and Alcaraz one.

They met for the first time in the fourth round of Wimbledon, where Sinner defeated Alcaraz in four sets.

The pair met again later that month in their first final in Umag, where Alcaraz was the defending champion. Alcaraz took the first set before being breadsticked twice by Sinner in the second and third sets. This was Sinner's first title on clay courts.

Their third meeting in 2022 was in the quarterfinals of the US Open. Alcaraz took the first set before losing the second and third sets in two tiebreaks. He then saved a match point in the fourth set, before recovering to win in five. The match lasted five hours and 15 minutes, and recorded what was then the latest finish in the history of the tournament at 2:50AM. It is widely considered one of the best matches of their rivalry to date. Alcaraz went on to win the tournament, claiming his first major title and becoming the youngest men's world No. 1 in the Open Era.

=== 2023 ===
Alcaraz and Sinner met three times in 2023, with Sinner winning two matches and Alcaraz one.

Their first encounter was a semifinal at Indian Wells, which Alcaraz claimed in straight sets en route to the title. Two weeks later they met again at the same stage in Miami, where Sinner defeated defending champion Alcaraz in three sets, dashing his hopes of achieving the Sunshine Double.

They met for a final time in 2023 in the semifinals of Beijing, where Sinner defeated Alcaraz in straight sets for the first time en route to the title, pulling ahead in the rivalry at 4–3.

=== 2024 ===
Alcaraz and Sinner met three times in 2024. All three matches were won by Alcaraz.

Their first encounter was a rematch at Indian Wells. Defending champion Alcaraz was breadsticked by Sinner in the first set, before recovering to win the match in three sets en route to retaining his title. He snapped Sinner's 19-match win streak and levelled their rivalry at 4–4.

They next met in June for a semifinal encounter at the French Open. Both players had experienced injuries earlier in the clay season and struggled physically throughout a gruelling five-set encounter. Despite the length of the match, it is not generally considered to be one of their higher quality encounters. Alcaraz won the match, drawing ahead in the rivalry at 5–4, and went on to win the title. Following the tournament, Sinner became world No. 1 for the first time.

Their last meeting in 2024 was the final of China Open, where Sinner was the defending champion. The match went to a dramatic deciding-set tiebreak, in which Sinner initially took a 3–0 lead before Alcaraz won seven consecutive points to clinch the title. At three hours and 21 minutes, it was the longest match in the history of the tournament. Alcaraz snapped Sinner's 15-match win streak and returned to No. 2 in the world rankings.

=== 2025 ===
Alcaraz and Sinner met six times in 2025 (all finals), with Alcaraz winning four matches and Sinner two.

In May, they contested their first Masters final against each other at the Italian Open. Alcaraz clinched a nervy first set which ended in a tiebreak, and went on to dominate Sinner in the second set. This was Sinner's first loss in straight sets since 2023, and snapped his 26-match win streak, which had been ongoing since his last loss to Alcaraz.

Less than a month later, they met for their first major final at the French Open, where Alcaraz was defending champion. Sinner established a two-set lead, but Alcaraz took the third set. In the fourth set, Sinner held three championship points on Alcaraz's serve at 5–3. Alcaraz held from 0–40 and then broke Sinner's serve to force a tiebreak and win the set. The match therefore progressed to a fifth set, which Alcaraz eventually claimed in a dominant super tiebreak. This was Alcaraz's fifth consecutive win over Sinner, and Sinner's first loss in a major final. At five hours and 29 minutes, it was the longest-ever French Open final. It was also the first major final to be contested by two men born in the 21st century. The Guardian acclaimed it as "one of the greatest finals ever played, in any sport."

Five weeks later, they met for a rematch in the Wimbledon final. Sinner defeated two-time defending champion Alcaraz in four sets, dropping the first, to win his first Wimbledon title. Sinner's victory over Alcaraz ended several streaks: Sinner's five-match losing streak against Alcaraz, Alcaraz's winning streaks at Wimbledon, and Alcaraz's overall 24-match winning streak. It was also Alcaraz's first loss in a major final, and prevented him from becoming the first man to defend the Channel Slam since Björn Borg.

Both players withdrew from the Canadian Open and returned to competition at the Cincinnati Open, where they met again in the final. This was a truncated affair, as Sinner retired due to illness with Alcaraz leading 5–0 in the first set. They then met for a third consecutive major final at the US Open, as the first pair of men to contest three major finals in the same calendar year. Alcaraz defeated defending champion Sinner in four sets, dropping the second. He ended Sinner's winning streak at the hardcourt majors, and reclaimed the world No. 1 ranking for the first time in two years. Alcaraz and Sinner therefore split the majors at two-apiece for the second consecutive year.

At the 2025 ATP Finals, Sinner and Alcaraz both won all three of their round-robin matches to progress to the semifinals, where they both dispatched their opponents in straight sets. In the final, Sinner defeated Alcaraz in straight sets to defend his title. At the completion of the 2025 season, the two players were perfectly tied at 1,651 points won in matches between them.

=== 2026 ===
Sinner and Alcaraz met in the final of the Monte-Carlo Masters, a match which doubled as a shootout for the world No. 1 ranking. Sinner defeated Alcaraz in straight sets to regain the ranking. This turned out to be their only meeting all year: Alcaraz played one match at his next tournament in Barcelona before withdrawing due to a wrist injury, and remained absent from tour until the US Open. Sinner meanwhile developed a knee injury after Wimbledon, and withdrew from the rest of the season.

They ended the season with one slam each: the Australian Open for Alcaraz, and Wimbledon for Sinner. The French Open, where Alcaraz was absent and Sinner was upset in the second round, ended their streak of nine consecutive major titles which had begun in 2024.

== Head-to-head matches ==
Record by tier
Legend	Alcaraz	Sinner
Grand Slam	4	2
ATP Finals	0	1
ATP 1000	5	2
ATP 500	1	1
ATP 250	0	1
Total	10	7

Record by surface
Surface	Alcaraz	Sinner
Hard	7	3
Grass	0	2
Clay	3	2
Total	10	7

=== Singles (17) ===
Alcaraz 10 – Sinner 7

No.	Year	Tournament	Tier	Surface	Round	Winner	Score	Length	Sets	Alcaraz	Sinner
1	2021	Paris Masters	ATP 1000	Hard (i)	Round of 32	Alcaraz	7–6^{(7–1)}, 7–5	2:08	2/3	1	0
2	2022	Wimbledon Championships	Grand Slam	Grass	Round of 16	Sinner	6–1, 6–4, 6–7^{(8–10)}, 6–3	3:35	4/5	1	1
3	2022	Croatia Open	ATP 250	Clay	Final	Sinner	6–7^{(5–7)}, 6–1, 6–1	2:26	3/3	1	2
4	2022	US Open	Grand Slam	Hard	Quarterfinals	Alcaraz	6–3, 6–7^{(7–9)}, 6–7^{(0–7)}, 7–5, 6–3	5:15	5/5	2	2
5	2023	Indian Wells Open	ATP 1000	Hard	Semifinals	Alcaraz	7–6^{(7–4)}, 6–3	1:52	2/3	3	2
6	2023	Miami Open	ATP 1000	Hard	Semifinals	Sinner	6–7^{(4–7)}, 6–4, 6–2	3:02	3/3	3	3
7	2023	China Open	ATP 500	Hard	Semifinals	Sinner	7–6^{(7–4)}, 6–1	1:55	2/3	3	4
8	2024	Indian Wells Open	ATP 1000	Hard	Semifinals	Alcaraz	1–6, 6–3, 6–2	2:05	3/3	4	4
9	2024	French Open	Grand Slam	Clay	Semifinals	Alcaraz	2–6, 6–3, 3–6, 6–4, 6–3	4:09	5/5	5	4
10	2024	China Open	ATP 500	Hard	Final	Alcaraz	6–7^{(6–8)}, 6–4, 7–6^{(7–3)}	3:21	3/3	6	4
11	2025	Italian Open	ATP 1000	Clay	Final	Alcaraz	7–6^{(7–5)}, 6–1	1:43	2/3	7	4
12	2025	French Open	Grand Slam	Clay	Final	Alcaraz	4–6, 6–7^{(4–7)}, 6–4, 7–6^{(7–3)}, 7–6^{(10–2)}	5:29	5/5	8	4
13	2025	Wimbledon Championships	Grand Slam	Grass	Final	Sinner	4–6, 6–4, 6–4, 6–4	3:04	4/5	8	5
14	2025	Cincinnati Open	ATP 1000	Hard	Final	Alcaraz	5–0 ret.	0:23	1/3	9	5
15	2025	US Open	Grand Slam	Hard	Final	Alcaraz	6–2, 3–6, 6–1, 6–4	2:42	4/5	10	5
16	2025	ATP Finals	Tour Finals	Hard (i)	Final	Sinner	7–6^{(7–4)}, 7–5	2:15	2/3	10	6
17	2026	Monte-Carlo Masters	ATP 1000	Clay	Final	Sinner	7–6^{(7–5)}, 6–3	2:15	2/3	10	7

== Statistical comparison ==
=== Big titles ===
Category	Alcaraz	Sinner
Grand Slam	7	5
ATP Finals	1	2
Masters 1000	9	10
Total	17	17

=== ATP year-end ranking timeline ===
Player	2018	2019	2020	2021	2022	2023	2024	2025	2026
(Spain) Carlos Alcaraz	1491	492	141	32	1	2	3	1	3
(Italy) Jannik Sinner	551	78	37	10	15	4	1	2	2

=== Singles rankings achievements ===
Rankings	Alcaraz	Sinner
Weeks as ATP No. 1	66	95
ATP Year-end No. 1	2	1
World Tennis Champions	0	2

== Performance timeline comparison (Grand Slam tournaments) ==
Key
**W**	F	SF	QF	#R	RR	Q#	DNQ	A	NH

(W) winner; (F) finalist; (SF) semifinalist; (QF) quarterfinalist; (#R) rounds 4, 3, 2, 1; (RR) round-robin stage; (Q#) qualification round; (DNQ) did not qualify; (A) absent; (NH) not held; (SR) strike rate (events won / competed); (W–L) win–loss record.
To avoid confusion and double counting, these charts are updated at the conclusion of a tournament or when the player's participation has ended.
- **Bold** = players met during this tournament

=== 2019–2024 ===
Player	2019				2020				2021				2022				2023				2024			
Player	AUS	FRA	WIM	USA	AUS	FRA	WIM	USA	AUS	FRA	WIM	USA	AUS	FRA	WIM	USA	AUS	FRA	WIM	USA	AUS	FRA	WIM	USA
(Spain) **Carlos Alcaraz**	A	A	A	A	A	A	NH	A	2R	3R	2R	QF	3R	QF	**4R**	**W**	A	SF	W	SF	QF	**W**	W	2R
(Italy) **Jannik Sinner**	A	A	Q1	1R	2R	QF	NH	1R	1R	4R	1R	4R	QF	4R	**QF**	**QF**	4R	2R	SF	4R	W	**SF**	QF	W

=== 2025–present ===
Player	2025				2026				2027			
Player	AUS	FRA	WIM	USA	AUS	FRA	WIM	USA	AUS	FRA	WIM	USA
(Spain) **Carlos Alcaraz**	QF	**W**	**F**	**W**	W	A	A	QF				
(Italy) **Jannik Sinner**	W	**F**	**W**	**F**	SF	2R	W	A				

=== Combined singles performance timeline (best result) ===
Tournament	2019	2020	2021	2022	2023	2024	2025	2026	SR
**Grand Slam tournaments**
Australian Open	A	2R^{S}	2R^{A}	QF^{S}	4R^{S}	**W**^{S}	**W**^{S}	**W**^{A}	3 / 7
French Open	A	QF^{S}	4R^{S}	QF^{A}	SF^{A}	**W**^{A}	**W**^{A}	2R^{S}	2 / 6
Wimbledon	Q1^{S}	NH	2R^{A}	QF^{S}	**W**^{A}	**W**^{A}	**W**^{S}	**W**^{S}	4 / 7
US Open	1R^{S}	1R^{S}	QF^{A}	**W**^{A}	SF^{A}	**W**^{S}	**W**^{A}	QF^{A}	3 / 8

=== Alcaraz–Sinner Big Titles performances (2022–present) ===
Year	Australian Open	French Open	Wimbledon	US Open	Indian Wells Masters	Miami Open	Monte Carlo Masters	Madrid Open	Italian Open	Canadian Open	Cincinnati Masters	Shanghai Masters	Paris Masters	ATP Finals	Olympic Games
2022	(Spain) Nadal	(Spain) Nadal	(Serbia) Djokovic	(Spain) Alcaraz	(United States) Fritz	(Spain) Alcaraz	(Greece) Tsitsipas	(Spain) Alcaraz	(Serbia) Djokovic	(Spain) Carreño Busta	(Croatia) Ćorić	NH	(Denmark) Rune	(Serbia) Djokovic	NH
2023	(Serbia) Djokovic	(Serbia) Djokovic	(Spain) Alcaraz	(Serbia) Djokovic	(Spain) Alcaraz	Medvedev	Rublev	(Spain) Alcaraz	Medvedev	(Italy) Sinner	(Serbia) Djokovic	(Poland) Hurkacz	(Serbia) Djokovic	(Serbia) Djokovic	NH
2024	(Italy) Sinner	(Spain) Alcaraz	(Spain) Alcaraz	(Italy) Sinner	(Spain) Alcaraz	(Italy) Sinner	(Greece) Tsitsipas	Rublev	(Germany) Zverev	(Australia) Popyrin	(Italy) Sinner	(Italy) Sinner	(Germany) Zverev	(Italy) Sinner	(Serbia) Djokovic
2025	(Italy) Sinner	(Spain) Alcaraz	(Italy) Sinner	(Spain) Alcaraz	(United Kingdom) Draper	(Czech Republic) Menšík	(Spain) Alcaraz	(Norway) Ruud	(Spain) Alcaraz	(United States) Shelton	(Spain) Alcaraz	(Monaco) Vacherot	(Italy) Sinner	(Italy) Sinner	NH
2026	(Spain) Alcaraz	(Germany) Zverev	(Italy) Sinner	(Germany) Zverev	(Italy) Sinner	(Italy) Sinner	(Italy) Sinner	(Italy) Sinner	(Italy) Sinner	(United States) Shelton	(France) Fils	(Spain) Davidovich Fokina	(Spain) Alcaraz		NH

== Significant achievements ==
- Longest French Open final ever played (2025 French Open) at 5 hours and 29 minutes.
- First major final contested between two men born in the 21st century (i.e. after the year 2000).
- First pair of men's singles players in the Open Era to contest three major finals in the same year.
- First pair of men's singles players in the Open Era to win a combined 50 Grand Slam matches in a year (2025).

== Exhibitions ==
Sinner 2 — Alcaraz 1

No.	Year	Tournament	Surface	Round	Winner	Score	Length
1	2024	(Saudi Arabia) 6 Kings Slam	Hard (i)	Final	Sinner	6–7^{(5–7)}, 6–3, 6–3	2:18
2	2025	(Saudi Arabia) 6 Kings Slam	Hard (i)	Final	Sinner	6–2, 6–4	1:11
3	2026	(South Korea) Hyundai Card Super Match	Hard (i)	—	Alcaraz	7–5, 7–6^{(8–6)}	1:48

== See also ==
- List of tennis rivalries
