= 2025 French Open – Men's singles final =

Championship tennis match in Paris, France

2025 French Open Men's Singles Final
- (Italy) Jannik Sinner (1) vs. (Spain) Carlos Alcaraz (2)
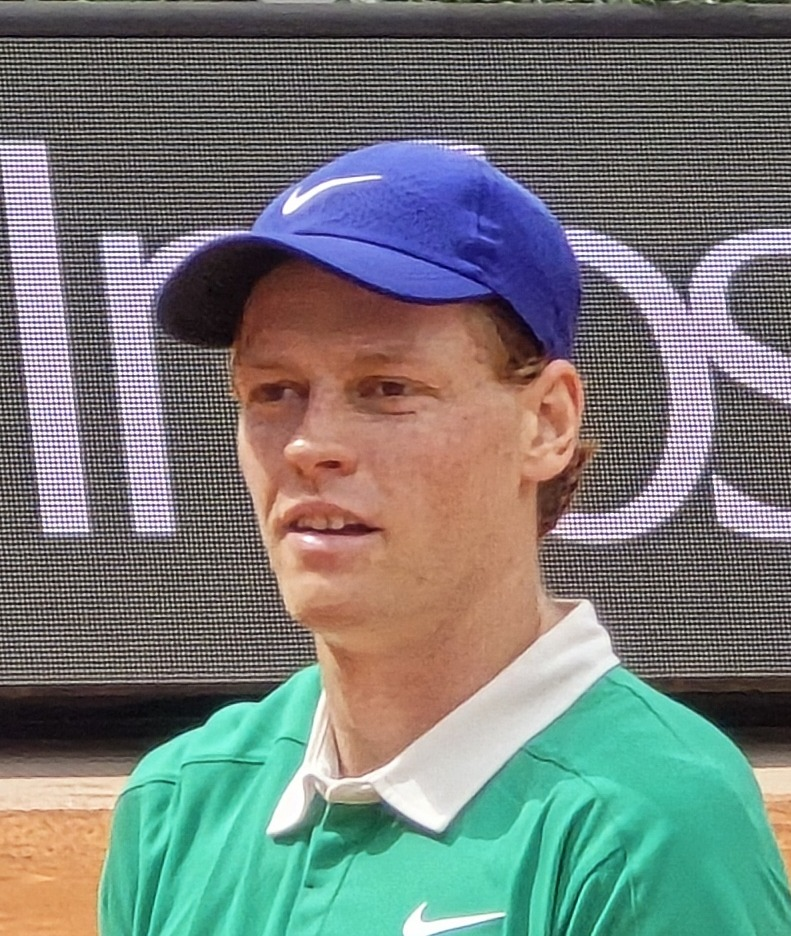
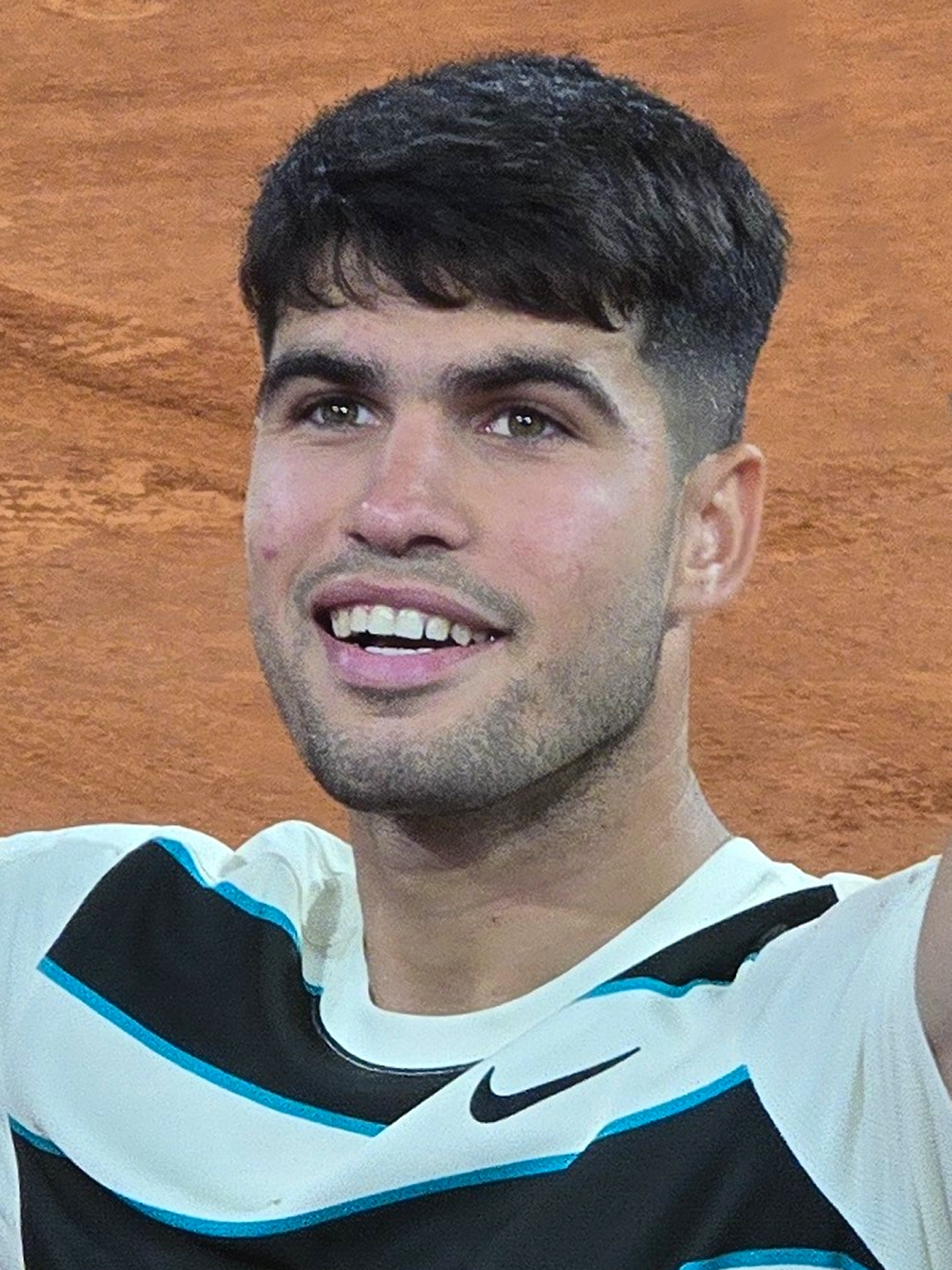
- Jannik Sinner (left) and Carlos Alcaraz (right)
Set	1	2	3	4	5
(Italy) Jannik Sinner	6	7^{7}	4	6^{3}	6^{2}
(Spain) Carlos Alcaraz	4	6^{4}	6	7^{7}	7^{10}
- Date: 8 June 2025
- Tournament: French Open
- Location: Court Philippe Chatrier, Stade Roland Garros, Paris
- Chair umpire: Eva Asderaki
- Duration: 5 hours 29 minutes

The 2025 French Open men's singles final was the championship tennis match of the men's singles tournament at the 2025 French Open. A part of the Alcaraz–Sinner rivalry, it pitted then-top-ranked Jannik Sinner against second-ranked and defending champion Carlos Alcaraz for the first time in a major final. After 5 hours and 29 minutes of play, Alcaraz defeated Sinner 4–6, 6–7^{(4–7)}, 6–4, 7–6^{(7–3)}, 7–6^{(10–2)}. It was the longest French Open final in history, and the second-longest major final overall (behind only the 2012 Australian Open men's singles final, which lasted for 5 hours and 53 minutes).

Alcaraz saved three (consecutive) championship points—the most in a men's major final in the Open Era—and overturned a two-set deficit to claim his fifth major, marking his first career comeback from a two-set deficit. Alcaraz was only the third man in the Open Era to win a major after being championship points down, after Gastón Gaudio in the 2004 French Open final, and Novak Djokovic in the 2019 Wimbledon final. His two-sets-to-love-down comeback marked the sixth such comeback in a French Open final in the Open Era, the other five instances coming in 1974, 1984, 1999, 2004, and 2021.

== Background ==
Heading into the match, Sinner and Alcaraz were the top two-ranked players in the world. They had collectively won the previous five majors, and were each undefeated in career major finals (Alcaraz at 4–0 and Sinner at 3–0). This was their twelfth career meeting, but their first in a major final. Alcaraz led their head-to-head 7–4, having won their four most recent encounters, the last at the 2025 Italian Open final. Alcaraz was also the defending champion at Roland-Garros and the leading clay-court player of the season, after titles at the Monte-Carlo and Rome Masters events. Conversely, Sinner was on a 20-match winning streak at majors, having won the preceding US Open and Australian Open titles, but was playing only his second event following a three-month suspension, after reaching a case resolution agreement with the World Anti-Doping Agency. Sinner's career-best finish at the French Open was a semifinal appearance the previous year, where he lost to Alcaraz in five sets.

Sinner reached the final without dropping a set, while Alcaraz played four four-set matches en route. Sinner held superior statistics if the match was shorter; Alcaraz, on the other hand, possessed a better record if the match became lengthy, with a 12–1 career record in fifth sets compared to Sinner's 0–6 record in matches lasting over three hours and 50 minutes.

Heading into the final, Sinner was seeking to win his first French Open title and achieve the third leg of a potential career Grand Slam and non-calendar Grand Slam, and to become the first man since Rafael Nadal at the 2020 French Open to win a major without dropping a set. Alcaraz was seeking to be the first man to defend a French Open title since Nadal in 2020, and to become the third-youngest man in the Open Era to win a fifth major title. Both were vying to keep their undefeated records in major finals.

== Match summary ==
The first set started out competitively, with the first game lasting ten minutes. Alcaraz broke Sinner in the fifth game to take the lead. However, Sinner then broke back and held in the next game to take a 4–3 lead. After trading games, Sinner broke Alcaraz again in the last game to win 6–4, after a 62-minute set.

Sinner's domination continued into the second set, winning the first three games and having a stretch where he won 18 out of 24 points. After trading holds, Sinner opened up a 5–2 lead, having won nine out of the previous twelve games. At this point, Alcaraz stormed back, holding twice and breaking once to tie the set at 5–5. A trade of holds led the set to enter a tiebreaker, which Sinner won 7–4, thanks to pulling out to an early 6–2 lead.

Alcaraz had never previously won a match after being down two sets to love. In the third set, after a trade of breaks to start, he took a 4–1 lead. Sinner was able to hold the next two games he served and then break after that to make it 5–4, but Alcaraz broke Sinner's serve in the final game to win the set 6–4. This ended Sinner's streak of 31 straight sets won at Grand Slam tournaments.

The fourth set began with both players holding serve until the score was 3–3. Then, Sinner broke and then held to take a 5–3 lead. He then took a 40–0 lead in the next game to hold three championship points. Alcaraz saved all three, en route to winning the next 13 out of 14 points, and taking the lead at 6–5. Sinner then held serve to force another tiebreaker. From 2–2, Alcaraz won five of the next six points to win the tie-breaker 7–3.

To start the final set, Alcaraz broke Sinner early for a 2–0 lead. Following this, neither player was broken, and the score reached 5–3 to Alcaraz. Sinner then held the next game. With Alcaraz serving for the title, Sinner broke back, only letting him score one point. Sinner then held again to take the lead 6–5. After Alcaraz held the next game, the final set proceeded to a 10-point super tiebreak. Alcaraz took a 7–0 lead; Sinner won the next two points, but Alcaraz then won the final three to close and win the match. The final lasted five hours and twenty-nine minutes and ended with a score of 6–4, 7–6^{(7–4)}, 4–6, 6–7^{(3–7)}, 6–7^{(2–10)}.

== Statistics ==
Category	Sinner	Alcaraz
Aces	8	7
Double faults	0	7
1st serve % in	103–191 = 54%	113–194 = 58%
Winning % on 1st Serve	72–103 = 70%	71–113 = 63%
Winning % on 2nd Serve	44–88 = 50%	46–81 = 57%
Net points won	30–45 = 67%	22–33 = 67%
Break points won	7–15 = 47%	7–14 = 50%
Receiving points won	77–194 = 40%	75–191 = 39%
Winners	53	70
Unforced errors	64	73
Winners-UFE	−11	−3
Total points won	193	192
Total games won	29	30

_{Source:}

== Reactions and significance ==
Jonathan Jurejko of BBC Sport called Alcaraz's win "the finest performance of his career," and Alcaraz himself stated it was "the most exciting match that [he'd] played so far, without a doubt." It has been praised as one of the greatest matches in tennis history by former top players and analysts such as Tim Henman and Andy Roddick, and former world number one Billie Jean King labelled it one of the greatest finals she had "ever watched", while Daniel Harris of The Guardian called it "one of the greatest finals ever played, in any sport". Steve Tignor of Tennis.com described it as "the match of the decade, and maybe the century". Roger Federer said that three champions emerged from the match: Alcaraz, Sinner, and "the beautiful game of tennis".

The match became the first among a trilogy of major finals played by Alcaraz and Sinner in 2025. Five weeks after the French Open final, Sinner defeated two-time defending champion Alcaraz in the 2025 Wimbledon final; he later said that reversing the result in Paris was the proudest aspect of his victory. Eight weeks after the Wimbledon final, Alcaraz then defeated Sinner, who was the defending champion, in the 2025 US Open final.

This series of finals has been described by some as finally closing the Big Three era of tennis and cementing the Alcaraz–Sinner rivalry as the new era-defining matchup.

== See also ==
- Alcaraz–Sinner rivalry
