= Carlos Alcaraz =

Spanish tennis player (born 2003)

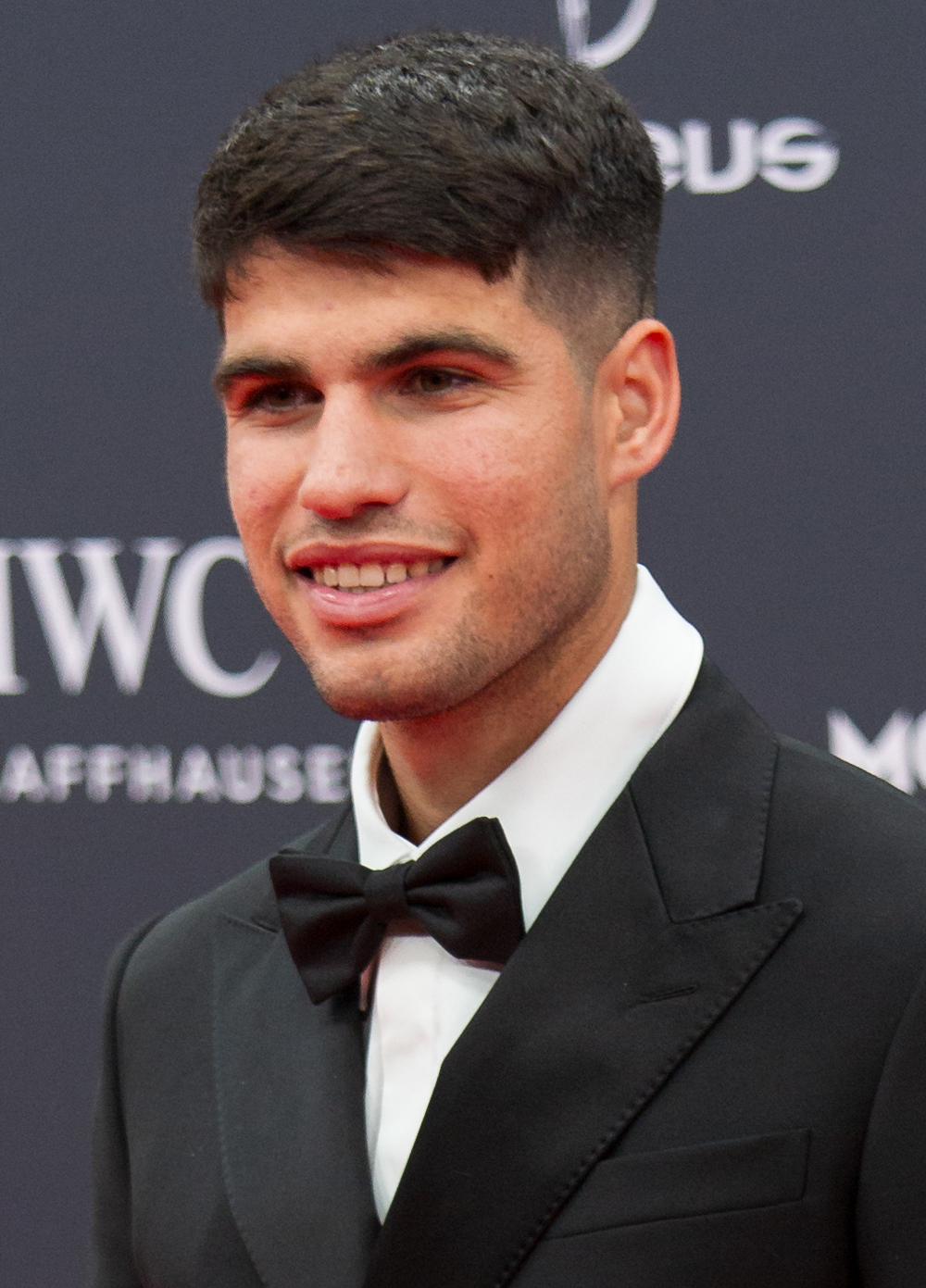
- Alcaraz at the 25th Laureus World Sports Awards
- Full name: Carlos Alcaraz Garfia
- Country (sports): Spain
- Residence: El Palmar, Murcia, Spain
- Born: 5 May 2003 (age 23) El Palmar, Murcia, Spain
- Height: 1.83 m (6 ft 0 in)
- Turned pro: 2018
- Plays: Right-handed (two-handed backhand)
- Coach: Juan Carlos Ferrero (2019–2025); Samuel López (2024–present)
- Prize money: US $69,137,608: 6th all-time in earnings

Singles
- Career record: 327–70 (82.4%)
- Career titles: 30
- Highest ranking: No. 1 (12 September 2022)
- Current ranking: No. 3 (9 November 2026)

Grand Slam singles results
- Australian Open: W (2026)
- French Open: W (2024, 2025)
- Wimbledon: W (2023, 2024)
- US Open: W (2022, 2025)

Other tournaments
- Tour Finals: W (2026)
- Olympic Games: F (2024)

Doubles
- Career record: 10–6
- Career titles: 0
- Highest ranking: No. 519 (9 May 2022)

Other doubles tournaments
- Olympic Games: QF (2024)

Grand Slam mixed doubles results
- US Open: QF (2026)
Medal record
Representing Spain
Olympic Games
Silver medal – second place	2024 Paris	Singles
- Last updated on: 22 November 2026.

Carlos Alcaraz Garfia (Note: Spanish: [ˈkaɾlos alkaˈɾaθ ˈɣaɾfja];) (born 5 May 2003) is a Spanish professional tennis player. He has been ranked world No. 1 in men's singles by the Association of Tennis Professionals (ATP) for 66 weeks, and finished as the year-end No. 1 in 2022 and 2025. Alcaraz has won 30 ATP Tour–level singles titles, including seven majors, the 2026 ATP Finals, and nine ATP Masters 1000 titles. He is the ninth and youngest man in history to complete the career Grand Slam in singles.

A teen phenomenon, Alcaraz won the Next Gen ATP Finals and was the 2020 ATP Newcomer of the Year. In 2022, Alcaraz won his first major title at the US Open. He became the youngest man in the Open Era to be ranked world No. 1, at 19 years, 130 days old, and finished the year as the youngest year-end No. 1 in ATP rankings history. Alcaraz won his second major title at the 2023 Wimbledon Championships, defeating seven-time champion Novak Djokovic in an epic final.

In 2024, Alcaraz won his first French Open and defended his title at Wimbledon, becoming the youngest man to win the "Channel Slam". In 2025, he defeated Jannik Sinner in a historic final to win the French Open, as well as the US Open, and finished as the year-end world No. 1 for a second time. In 2026, Alcaraz won his seventh major at the Australian Open, and became the youngest man to complete the career Grand Slam, at 22 years, 272 days old.

== Early and personal life ==
Carlos Alcaraz Garfia was born on 5 May 2003, in El Palmar, Murcia, Spain, to parents Carlos Alcaraz González and Virginia Garfia Escandón. Alcaraz has one older brother, Álvaro, and two younger brothers, Sergio and Jaime.

Alcaraz started playing tennis at the age of four at the Real Sociedad Club de Campo de Murcia, where his father was a tennis coach and club administrator. His mother worked as a sales assistant at IKEA. Alcaraz's father had played tennis but stopped pursuing a professional career as a teenager, as he could not afford it. In 2013, at age 10, Alcaraz signed his first contract with Babolat. After watching him compete at age 11, IMG agent Albert Molina recognized Carlos as a standout talent and sought to persuade his parents to work with him; his father ultimately agreed when Carlos was 12.

Alcaraz is frequently accompanied to tournaments by his father and by his brother Álvaro, who works as his hitting partner and assistant coach. During the tennis off-season, he lives at his parents' home in Murcia. His friends and family call him "Carlitos" or "Charly". He is Catholic, and has received blessings from priests before important tournaments.

== Junior career ==
At the age of 10, Alcaraz competed outside Spain for the first time at the under-10 World Championship in Croatia, where he lost in the final. That same year, he became an official member of the Babolat team, later joining the brand's international roster at age 13.

In 2015, Alcaraz won the under-12 division of the Rafa Nadal Tour Masters, and the following year captured the competition's under-14 title.

In 2017, Alcaraz enjoyed a breakthrough season at the under-14 level. He won the XIV Taça Internacional Maia Jovem, defeating Daniel Rincón in the final, and later captured the Babolat Cup. That summer, he helped Spain win the 14-and-under European Summer Cup and was part of the Spanish team that finished runner-up to Switzerland at the ITF World Junior Tennis Finals.

Alcaraz continued his rise in 2018. In July, he won the Dutch Junior Open, defeating Filip Kolasinski in the final, and weeks later captured the European 16-and-under Championship by defeating Elmer Møller. Later that year at the Junior Davis Cup in Budapest, he played a key role in Spain's title run, saving match point while trailing against Harold Mayot in singles before returning to win the decisive doubles match after France had taken an early lead.

In March 2019, Alcaraz won the J300 Villena, defeating Illya Beloborodko in the final, and was ranked No. 1 on the Tennis Europe Junior Tour during the year. As a junior, he achieved a career-high world ranking of No. 22.

== Professional career ==
=== 2018–2020: Pro debut ===
In February 2018, aged 14, Alcaraz played his first professional tennis event as a qualifier at the Spain F5 ITF Futures in Murcia. He knocked out second seed and world No. 292 Federico Gaio in the first round, and ultimately reached the quarterfinals. He collected his first two ATP points from this tournament, and entered the rankings as world No. 1414 on 26 February 2018.

In April 2019, aged 15, Alcaraz made his Challenger debut at the JC Ferrero Challenger in Villena. He won his first round match against a 17-year old Jannik Sinner, who was on a sixteen-match winning streak. With this victory, Alcaraz became the first player born in 2003 to win a Challenger match. He was defeated by eighth seed Lukáš Rosol in the second round. One week later at the Murcia Open, he defeated fifth seed and world No. 140 Pedro Martínez in the second round. Alcaraz went on to win four Challenger titles, three of them before the age of 18. He was the first player born in 2003 to reach a Challenger title match.

In February 2020, aged 16, Alcaraz made his ATP main-draw debut at the Rio Open after receiving a wild card for the singles main draw. He defeated world No. 41 Albert Ramos Viñolas in a marathon three-setter that lasted three hours and 37 minutes. Alcaraz became the first player born in 2003 to win an ATP Tour match, and also achieved this feat before anyone born in 2002. He was defeated in the second round by Federico Coria.

In September 2020, aged 17, Alcaraz played his first qualifying round at a major tournament at the postponed French Open. He held two match points to defeat Aleksandar Vukic in straight sets, but ended up losing in three.

=== 2021: First ATP title, Next Gen champion ===
Alcaraz made his debut in the main draw of a major as a qualifier at the 2021 Australian Open. He was the youngest man to qualify for the tournament since Novak Djokovic in 2005. As the main draw was postponed due to the COVID-19 pandemic, Alcaraz played the Great Ocean Road Open in early February, where he was defeated by Thiago Monteiro. In his first main draw match at the Australian Open, Alcaraz defeated fellow qualifier Botic van de Zandschulp in straight sets. He was the only teenager in the draw to progress past the first round, and the first person born in 2003 to win a match at a major. In the second round, Alcaraz was defeated by Mikael Ymer.

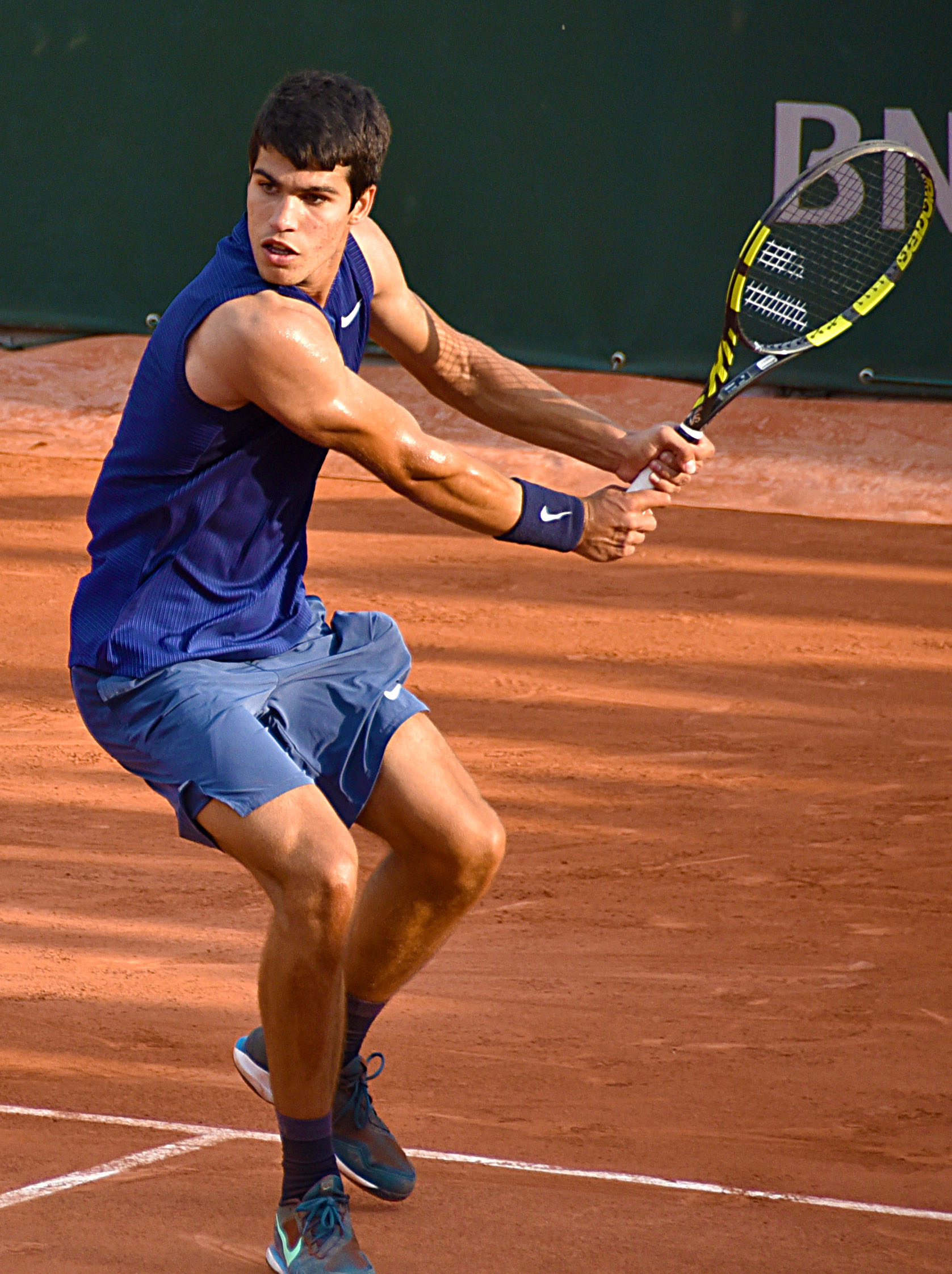
Alcaraz at the 2021 French Open

Alcaraz played a mix of Challenger and ATP Tour-level tournaments throughout the spring, including the Gran Canaria Challenger II and the Open Occitanie. He received wildcards at the Mexican Open, where he lost to eventual champion Alexander Zverev in the first round; at the Barcelona Open, where he lost to Frances Tiafoe in the first round; and at the Andalucía Open, where he defeated Nikola Milojevic, Feliciano Lopez, and third seed Casper Ruud to make the deepest ATP tournament run of his career. He lost to compatriot Jaume Munar in the semifinal.

Alcaraz received a wildcard at the Miami Open, where he lost in the first round to Emil Ruusuvuori. This was his first appearance at a ATP Masters 1000 tournament. He was given another ATP 1000 wildcard at the Madrid Open. Alcaraz became the youngest match winner in tournament history after his first round defeat of Adrian Mannarino, breaking a record set by Rafael Nadal in 2004. He then met Nadal for their first career meeting, and lost to him in two short sets on the day of his eighteenth birthday. Alcaraz entered the Challenger Oeiras III as an unseeded player, and defeated Facundo Bagnis in the final to claim the fourth Challenger title of his career. On 24 May 2021, he rose from 114th to 94th in the ATP rankings. He became the youngest player inside the top 100, as well as the youngest inside the top 500.

Alcaraz easily qualified for the French Open and reached the third round, where he was defeated by Jan-Lennard Struff. He was the youngest man to reach the third round at Roland Garros in 29 years, and the youngest to do so at any major since Nadal in 2004. Alcaraz then made his debut at Wimbledon via a wildcard. In the first round, he defeated Yasutaka Uchiyama in the first five-set match of his career. He was defeated in the second round in straight sets by world No. 2 Daniil Medvedev. In July, Alcaraz won the Umag Open, defeating Richard Gasquet to claim the first ATP title of his career. He was the youngest ATP champion since Kei Nishikori in 2008.

In the third round of the US Open, Alcaraz defeated world No. 3 Stefanos Tsitsipas in a dramatic fifth-set tiebreak on Arthur Ashe Stadium. At 18 years and four months, Alcaraz became the youngest man to beat a top 3 ranked-player in singles at the US Open since the ATP rankings began in 1973. He also became the youngest man in a major fourth round since 17-year-old Andrei Medvedev at the 1992 French Open, and the youngest man in the US Open fourth round since 17-year-old Michael Chang in 1989. Alcaraz then reached the quarterfinals by defeating qualifier Peter Gojowczyk. He became the youngest US Open men's quarterfinalist in the Open Era, the youngest all-time since Thomaz Koch in 1963, and the youngest at any major since Michael Chang at the 1990 French Open. He retired against Félix Auger-Aliassime in the quarterfinals after injuring his leg.

At Indian Wells, Alcaraz was seeded (30th) for the first time at an ATP Masters 1000 event, but lost in the first round to Andy Murray. At the Vienna Open two weeks later, Alcaraz met Murray for a rematch and defeated him. He then defeated world No. 7 Matteo Berrettini to claim a second career top 10 win, and entered the top 35 on 1 November. He lost to Alexander Zverev in the semifinal. At the Paris Masters, Alcaraz took a third top 10 win against eighth seed Jannik Sinner in their first ATP meeting. However, in the round of 16, Alcaraz was unable to cope with a raucous home crowd backing Frenchman Hugo Gaston and lost in straight sets. Alcaraz ended his season at the Next Gen ATP Finals; he had qualified as third seed behind Sinner and Auger-Aliassime, but became first seed after their withdrawals. He dominated the draw to win the title, dropping just one set.

=== 2022: US Open champion, world No. 1 ===
Alcaraz was seeded for the first time in a major at the Australian Open. He reached the third round, where he was defeated in a fifth set tiebreak by Matteo Berrettini. This was the only five set match Alcaraz would lose until the 2026 US Open. At the Rio Open, Alcaraz won his first ATP 500 title by defeating Diego Schwartzman in the final. He became the youngest winner of an ATP 500 event since the category was created in 2009. He entered the ATP top 20 for the first time on 21 February 2022.

At Indian Wells, Alcaraz defeated defending champion Cameron Norrie to reach his first ATP Masters 1000 quarterfinal and semifinal, which he lost to Rafael Nadal. Two weeks later, at the Miami Open, Alcaraz defeated Casper Ruud to win his first 1000 title. He was the youngest men's singles winner in tournament history, as well as the youngest men's ATP Masters 1000 champion since Rafael Nadal at Monte-Carlo in 2005. He was also the first Spaniard to win Miami. At Monte-Carlo, Alcaraz was upset by Sebastian Korda. Alcaraz beat top seed Stefanos Tsitsipas in the quarterfinals of the Barcelona Open to enter the world top 10 for the first time on 25 April 2022. He became the youngest man to break into the top 10 since Nadal on 25 April 2005, exactly 17 years earlier. Alcaraz defeated Pablo Carreño Busta to win the Barcelona title.

The day after his 19th birthday, Alcaraz defeated five-time champion, world No. 4 and third seed Rafael Nadal in the quarterfinals of the Madrid Open. This was Alcaraz's first victory against Nadal, and their final Tour-level meeting. The following day, Alcaraz faced world No. 1 Novak Djokovic for their first meeting. After three hours and thirty-six minutes, Alcaraz prevailed in a tight third set tiebreak. He became the youngest male player to win a match against a world No. 1 since Nadal in 2004, and the only player ever to defeat Nadal and Djokovic back-to-back on clay. In the final, Alcaraz dismantled defending champion and world No. 3 Alexander Zverev in an hour and four minutes. He became the youngest champion in the tournament's history at 19 years, 3 days. On 9 May 2022, Alcaraz climbed to a career-high ranking of world No. 6.

Alcaraz was widely projected to be one of the favorites for the French Open title. In his second round match against Albert Ramos Viñolas, he was taken to five sets and forced to save match point. He lost to Alexander Zverev in the quarterfinal. At Wimbledon, Alcaraz lost to Jannik Sinner in the fourth round. At the Hamburg Open, Alcaraz recorded his first-ever defeat in an ATP final against Lorenzo Musetti. Nevertheless, this result took him to a new career-high ranking of world No. 5 on July 25; he became the youngest male player to enter the top 5 since Nadal in 2005. Alcaraz reached and lost a second consecutive final at the Croatia Open Umag, in another defeat by Jannik Sinner. He became world No. 4 on 1 August.

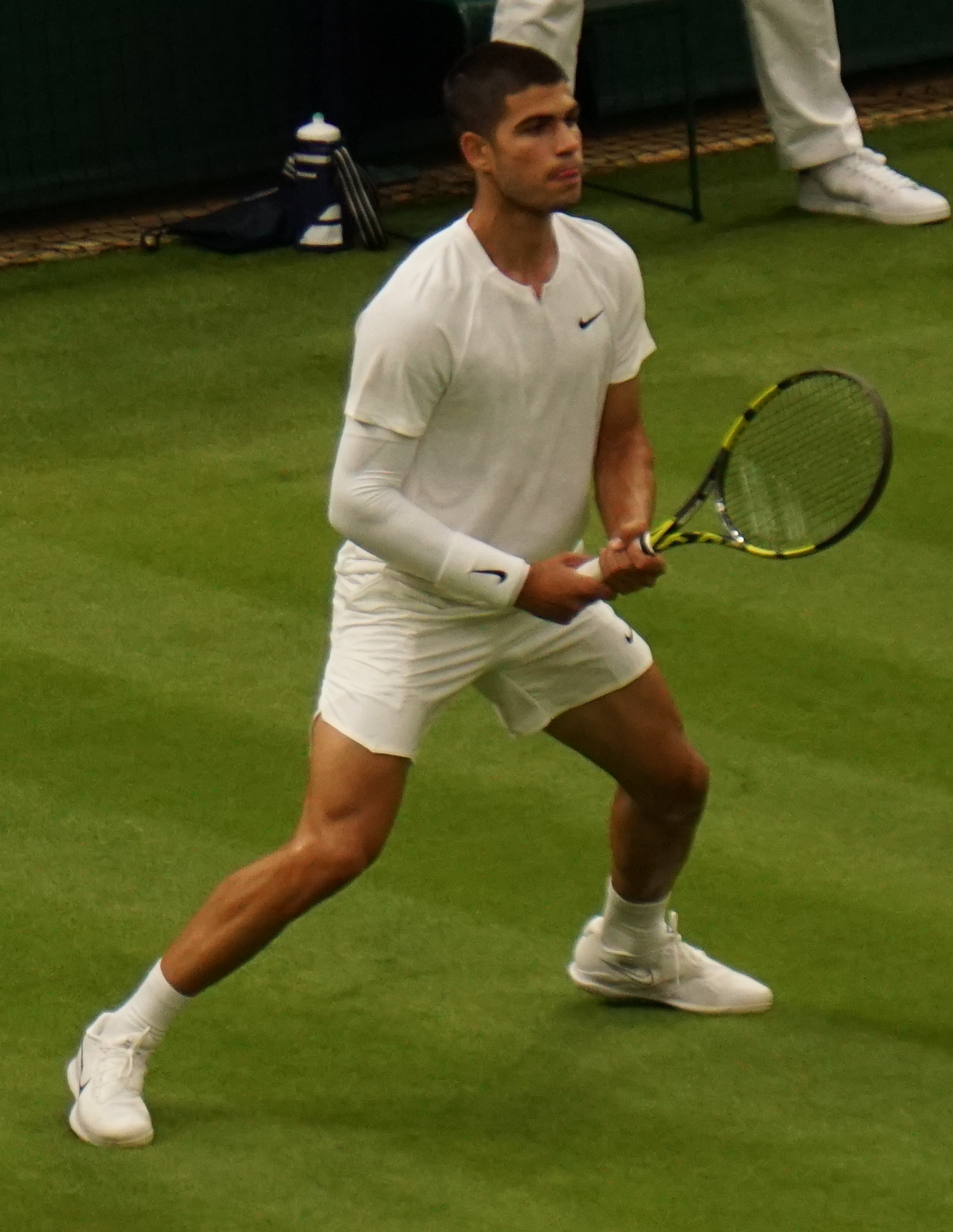
Alcaraz at the 2022 Wimbledon Championships

Alcaraz's North American swing did not start well: he was upset by Tommy Paul in his debut at the Canadian Open, and Cameron Norrie in the quarterfinals of the Cincinnati Open. Prior to the US Open, Alcaraz, Rafael Nadal, Casper Ruud, Daniil Medvedev, and Stefanos Tsitsipas were all in contention to take over the world No. 1 ranking. In the fourth round, Alcaraz defeated former champion Marin Čilić in five sets, and became the youngest man to reach back-to-back US Open quarterfinals in the Open Era. In the quarterfinals, Alcaraz saved a match point in the fourth set before recovering to win in five sets against Jannik Sinner. The match lasted five hours and fifteen minutes, and recorded the latest finish in the history of the tournament at 2:50AM EST. Alcaraz played a third consecutive five-setter to defeat Frances Tiafoe.

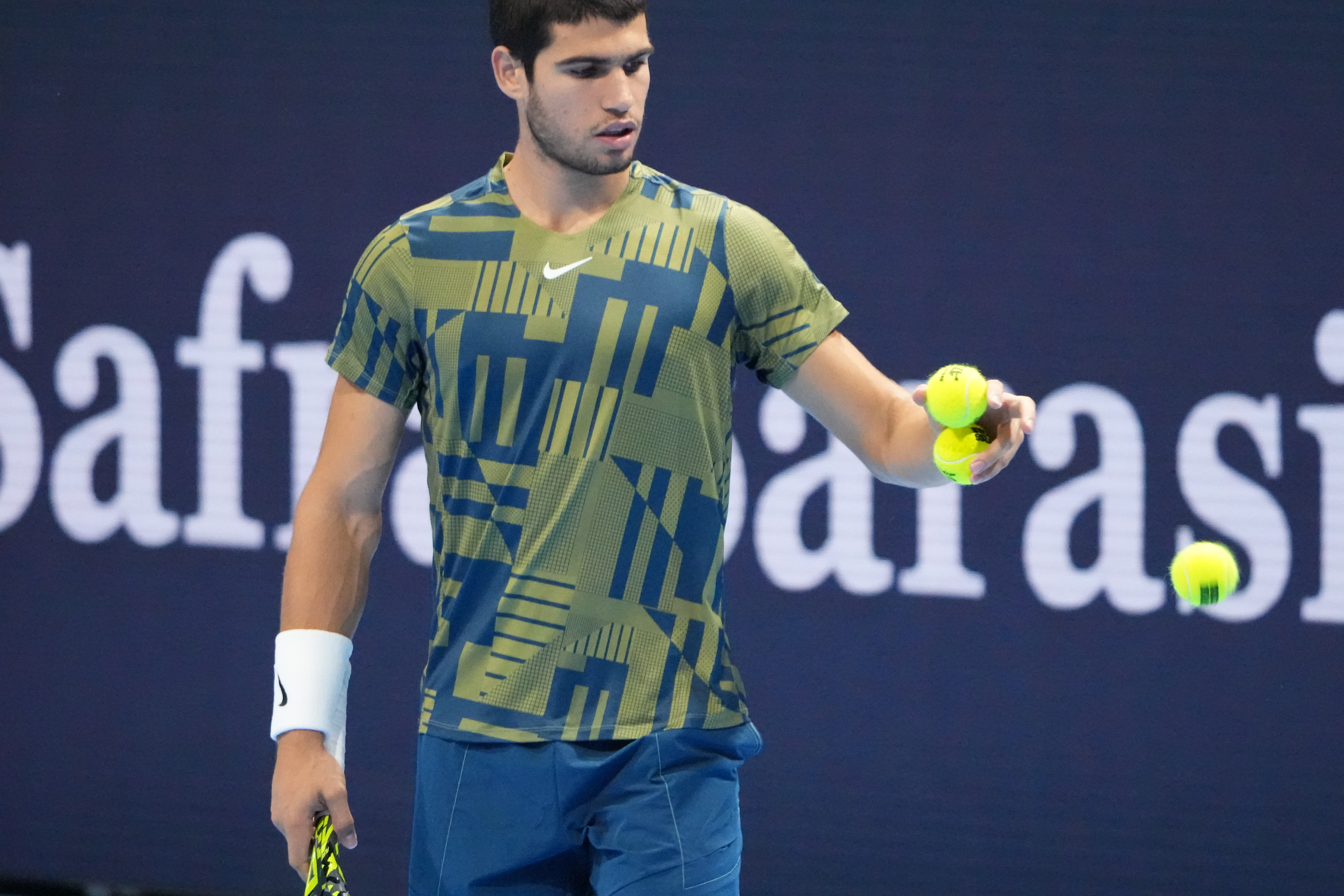
Carlos Alcaraz, Swiss Indoors Basel 2022.

Alcaraz then met fifth seed Casper Ruud for his first major final, a match which doubled as a shoot-out for the world No. 1 ranking. Alcaraz won the match in four sets to claim his first major title. He became the youngest No. 1 in the history of the ATP Rankings at 19 years, 130 days, breaking Lleyton Hewitt's record, and the second youngest all-time behind Lew Hoad. He also became the youngest men's major champion since Nadal at the 2005 French Open, the youngest US Open champion since Pete Sampras in 1990, and the first man born in the 2000s to win a major singles title.

Alcaraz's season ended more flatly. He lost his first singles match as world No. 1 to Félix Auger-Aliassime at the 2022 Davis Cup Finals. He lost to David Goffin in the first round of the Astana Open, and lost again to Auger-Aliassime in Basel. Alcaraz reached the quarterfinals of the Paris Masters, but retired down a set to Holger Rune. A day later, he announced he had suffered an abdominal tear requiring a six-week layoff, forcing him to end his season early. At 19 years and 214 days, Alcaraz ended the year as youngest and first teenage world No. 1 in the ATP era, and second youngest of all-time behind Hoad.

=== 2023: Wimbledon champion ===
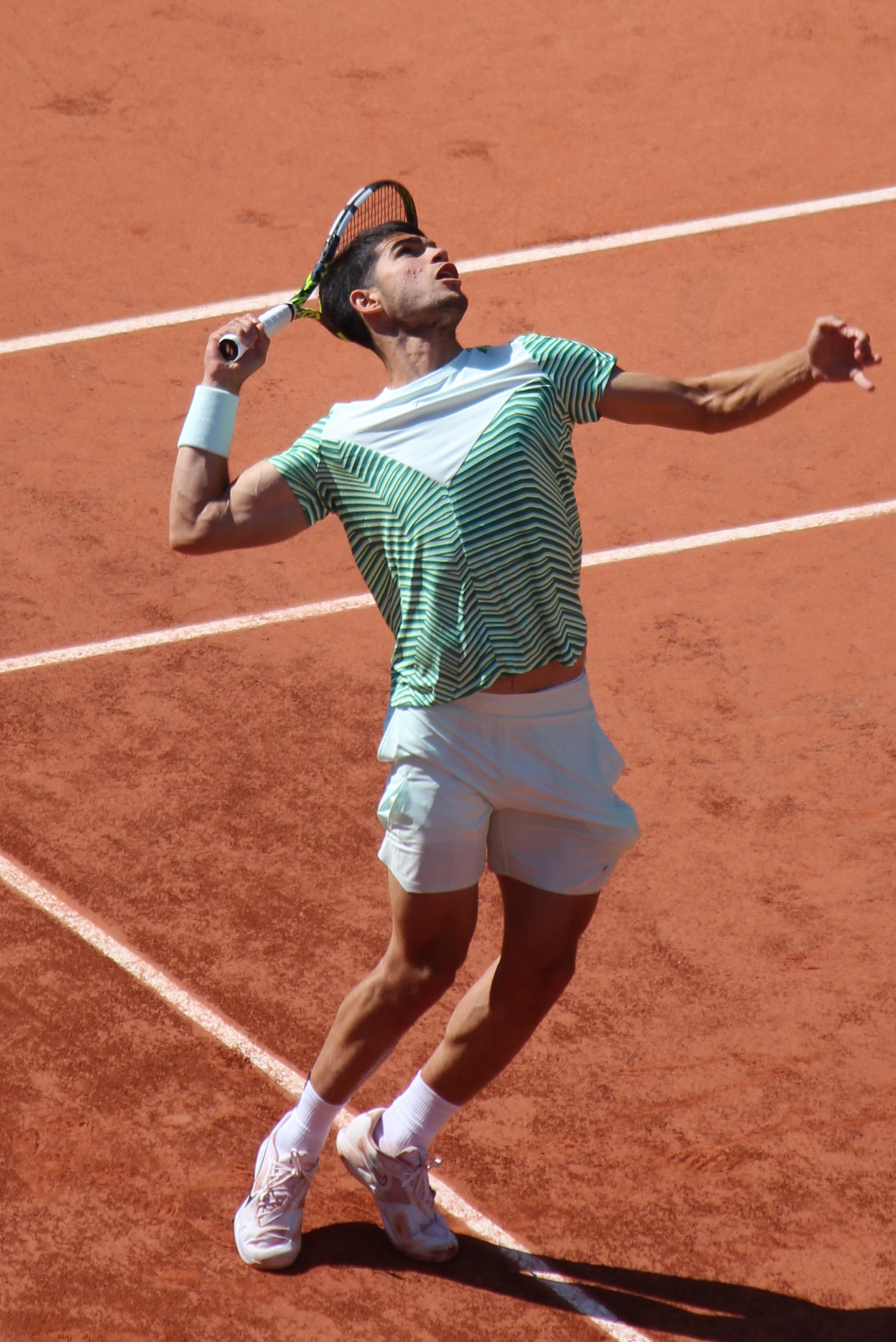
Alcaraz at the 2023 French Open

On January 7, Alcaraz announced his withdrawal from the Australian Open due to a right hamstring injury sustained while training. He had held the world No. 1 ranking for 20 weeks, but lost it after the tournament to champion Novak Djokovic. Alcaraz began his season at the Argentina Open, where he was playing for the first time. He defeated Cameron Norrie in the final in straight sets to claim his first title since the 2022 US Open. The next week, Alcaraz reached the final of the Rio Open, where he was defending champion, also against Norrie; however, he aggravated his leg injury during the match and lost in three sets. Alcaraz withdrew from the Mexican Open, citing the same injury.

At Indian Wells, Alcaraz recorded his 100th career win against 31st seed Tallon Griekspoor in the third round, making him the second fastest player to reach this milestone after John McEnroe. He defeated Jannik Sinner in the semifinal and Daniil Medvedev in the final to lift the trophy. He became the first male player to win Indian Wells without dropping a set since Roger Federer in 2017, and the youngest man to have won both legs of the Sunshine Double. As a result, he regained the world No. 1 ranking on 20 March 2023. Alcaraz hoped to complete the Sunshine Double in Miami, where he was the defending champion. He reached the semifinals without dropping a set, where he lost to Jannik Sinner in three sets. With the loss of his title points, Alcaraz dropped back to No. 2 in the world rankings.

Alcaraz was scheduled to play at the Monte-Carlo Masters the following week, but withdrew due to post-traumatic arthritis in his left hand and muscular discomfort in his spine. He defeated Stefanos Tsitsipas in the final of the Barcelona Open to defend his title without dropping a set. He also defended his title at the Madrid Open, defeating Jan-Lennard Struff to claim his tenth career title and cement his dominance on Spanish clay. At the Italian Open, Alcaraz recovered the No. 1 ranking from Djokovic just by playing his second round match. However, he was upset in the third round by world No. 135 Fabian Marozsan in straight sets, in what Jon Wertheim labelled the biggest upset of the year.

Alcaraz only dropped one set before the semifinals of Roland-Garros, where he met Novak Djokovic for their second career meeting. This was a highly anticipated showdown, as the two men had not played a match in over a year despite their ongoing fight over the world No. 1 ranking. The match was competitive until Alcaraz faltered at the start of the third set due to cramps from mental pressure and physical intensity; Djokovic won in four sets, going on to win the tournament and regain the No. 1 ranking.

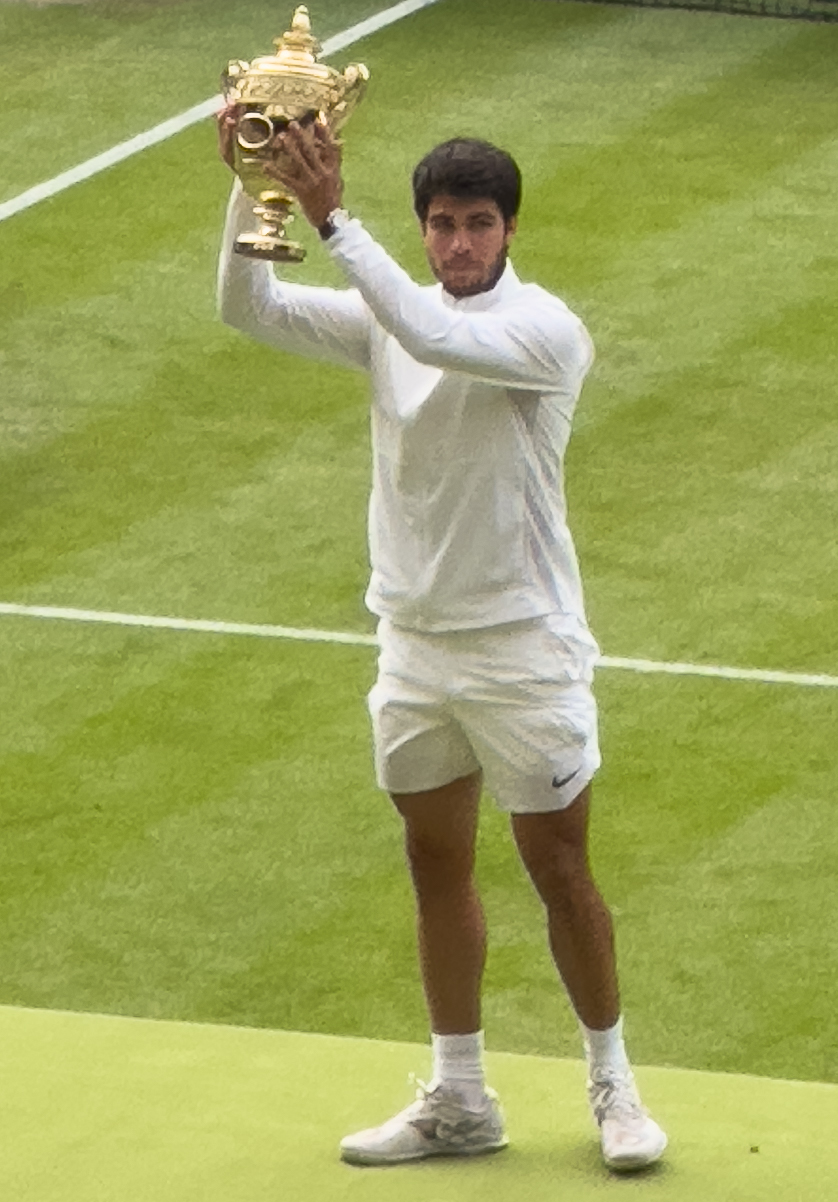
Alcaraz holding the Gentlemen's Singles Challenge Cup after winning the 2023 Wimbledon Championships

At the Queen's Club, Alcaraz claimed his first title on grass in just his third Tour-level grass tournament, beating Alex de Minaur in the final. This victory also restored him as world No. 1. Despite relatively muted expectations for Alcaraz at Wimbledon, he only dropped two sets en route to the final, where he faced off against seven-time champion and four-time defending champion Djokovic. Alcaraz was breadsticked in the first set but held his nerve to win the match in five sets. It lasted four hours and forty-two minutes, and was instantly acclaimed as a modern epic. This was his first Wimbledon title, and his second major title overall. Alcaraz also became the only man outside the Big Four to claim the Wimbledon singles title since 2002, before he himself had been born.

Alcaraz lost in the quarterfinals of Toronto to Tommy Paul. He then met Djokovic again for the Cincinnati final. Alcaraz lost in three sets, despite having a championship point in the second-set tiebreak. It was the longest ever best-of-three-sets ATP Masters 1000 final and the longest match in the tournament's history, at 3 hours and 49 minutes; Djokovic praised it as "one of the toughest matches of [his] life". Alcaraz entered the US Open as defending champion, and reached the semifinals for the loss of just one set. However, he lost there to 2021 champion Daniil Medvedev in four sets. Following the tournament, Alcaraz lost the No. 1 ranking once again to eventual champion Djokovic, who had not been defending any points.

Alcaraz entered the autumn-winter hardcourt season with the goal of seizing the year-end No. 1 ranking. However, just like 2022, he experienced an end-of-year slump as the tour moved back to fast hardcourt. He lost to Jannik Sinner in the semifinals of Beijing, and then to Grigor Dimitrov in the round of 16 at Shanghai. He withdrew from Basel due to injury, and lost in his opening round at the Paris Masters to Roman Safiullin. At the ATP Finals in Turin, Alcaraz lost to Alexander Zverev but defeated Andrey Rublev and Daniil Medvedev in the round robin stage. He qualified for the semifinals, where he lost decisively to eventual champion Djokovic. Ultimately, Alcaraz ended the year ranked No. 2.

=== 2024: Channel Slam, Olympic silver ===
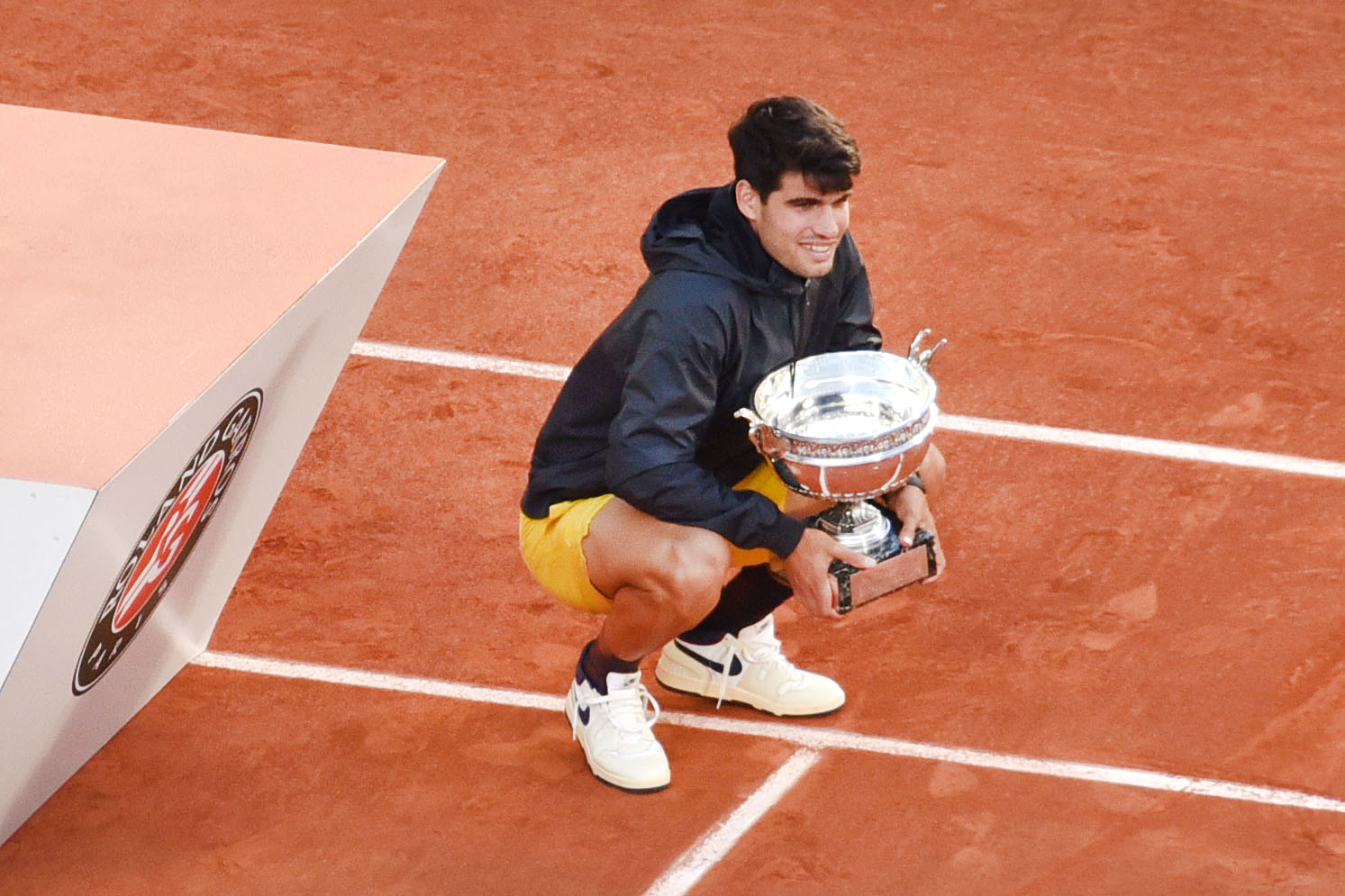
Alcaraz holding the Coupe des Mousquetaires following the men's singles final at the 2024 French Open

Alcaraz began his 2024 campaign at the Australian Open. He produced a dominant performance against Miomir Kecmanovic to reach the quarterfinals for the first time in his career; however, he lost there to Alexander Zverev in four sets. In February, Alcaraz chose to play on South American clay courts for the third year in a row. He entered the Argentina Open as defending champion, but lost to Nicolás Jarry in the semifinal. The following week, he retired from the Rio Open two games into his first match after twisting his right ankle. He announced that he had suffered a lateral sprain, but that he would miss just "a few days" of training before Indian Wells.

As defending champion on some of his favorite courts in Indian Wells, Alcaraz came back into form. In the semifinals, he defeated Jannik Sinner to end his 19-match winning streak. He then defeated Daniil Medvedev in the final, earning him his first title in eight months. In Miami, Alcaraz reached the quarterfinals without dropping a set but lost there to Grigor Dimitrov. Following the tournament, he dropped to world No. 3 behind Novak Djokovic and Miami champion Sinner.

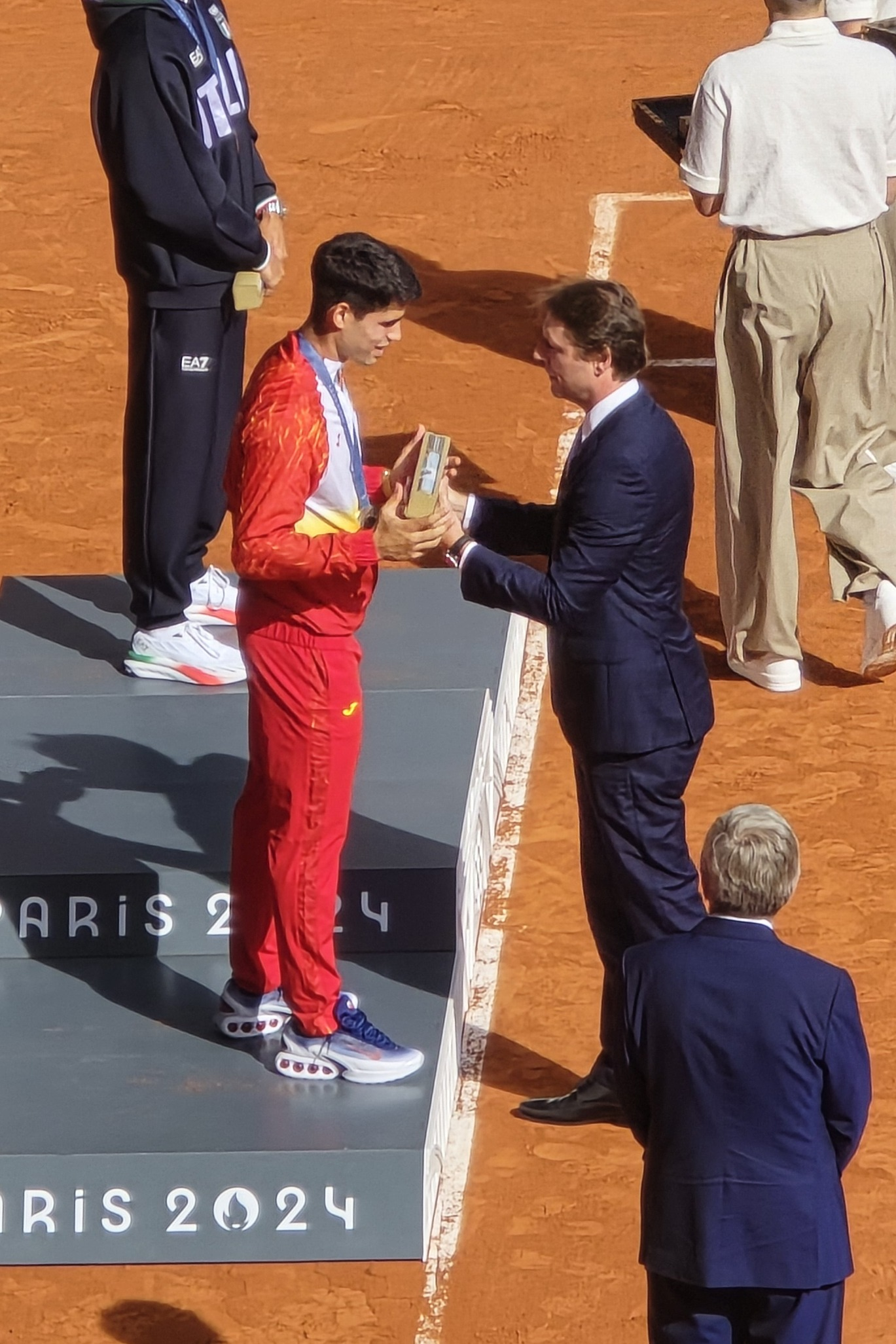
Alcaraz receiving his silver medal following the men's singles final at the 2024 Summer Olympics

Alcaraz's clay season was disrupted by injury. He withdrew from the Monte-Carlo Masters and the Barcelona Open due to a problem with his right forearm. In Madrid, Alcaraz continued to struggle with the injury, which hampered his ability to hit his signature forehand at full power. He lost in the quarterfinals to eventual champion Andrey Rublev, and withdrew from Rome. However, Alcaraz recovered in time to play the French Open in June. Despite some shaky early matches he reached the semi-final, where he defeated second seed Jannik Sinner in five gruelling sets to advance to his first Roland Garros final. Alcaraz defeated Alexander Zverev in another five-setter to claim his first Roland Garros title. At 21 years and 35 days, he became the youngest male player in history to win a major title on three different surfaces.

In July, Alcaraz defended his Wimbledon title by defeating Novak Djokovic in straight sets in a rematch of their 2023 final. At 21 years and 70 days, Alcaraz became the youngest male player in the Open Era to complete the Channel Slam (winning the French Open and Wimbledon in the same season). Alcaraz then entered the Olympic Games in both doubles and singles. Partnering Rafael Nadal, he reached the quarterfinals in doubles. In singles, Alcaraz reached the final without dropping a set. He was the heavy favorite for the gold medal; however, he lost to Djokovic in two tightly contested sets during which neither man dropped serve. He became the youngest-ever silver medalist in men's singles.

Alcaraz skipped the 2024 Canadian Open, citing fatigue. He played at the 2024 Cincinnati Open, but was upset by Gaël Monfils in the opening round. This match marked the first time Alcaraz broke a racket on court, which generated significant media coverage and drove him to deliver a public apology. He next played the 2024 US Open, where he suffered a shocking second-round defeat in straight sets to Botic van de Zandschulp. This was his earliest loss in a major since Wimbledon 2021.

Alcaraz recovered his morale with successes at the Davis Cup and Laver Cup team events. Afterwards, he defeated Jannik Sinner in the final of the China Open. This was Alcaraz's third encounter with Sinner in 2024, and his third victory. With this win, Alcaraz reclaimed the world No. 2 ranking from Alexander Zverev. He also became the first player in ATP Tour history to win an ATP 500 singles title on every surface – clay, grass and hardcourt. However, he delivered an otherwise shaky autumn for the third year in a row. He lost in the quarterfinals of the Shanghai Masters to Tomáš Macháč, and in the round of 16 at the Paris Masters to Ugo Humbert. He was unwell during the ATP Finals but did not withdraw, beating Andrey Rublev but losing to Casper Ruud and Alexander Zverev in straight sets to exit the tournament at the round robin stage. Alcaraz reunited with the Spanish Davis Cup team in Málaga for the quarterfinals. They were knocked out by the Netherlands, marking the end of Rafael Nadal's career. Alcaraz became the first man to finish a season ranked as low as world No. 3 after winning two majors.

=== 2025: French and US Open titles, return to No. 1 ===
Alcaraz began his 2025 season at the 2025 Australian Open, where he was vying to become the youngest man to complete a Career Grand Slam. However, he was defeated by Novak Djokovic in the quarterfinals, in what was widely analysed as a nervous match from his side of the net. Alcaraz opted to play on European hardcourts in February for the first time in his career. He won the first indoor hardcourt title of his career at the Rotterdam Open, where he defeated Alex de Minaur in the final. At the Qatar Open, Alcaraz lost in the quarterfinals to Jiří Lehečka, despite breaking Lehečka's serve first in every set. As the two-time defending champion at Indian Wells, Alcaraz lost to Jack Draper in the semifinals despite bagelling him in the second set. This was Alcaraz's first loss beyond the quarterfinal stage of a tournament in over a year. In dire form, Alcaraz then lost his first match in Miami to world No. 55 David Goffin, marking just his third career opening-round defeat at an ATP 1000 tournament.

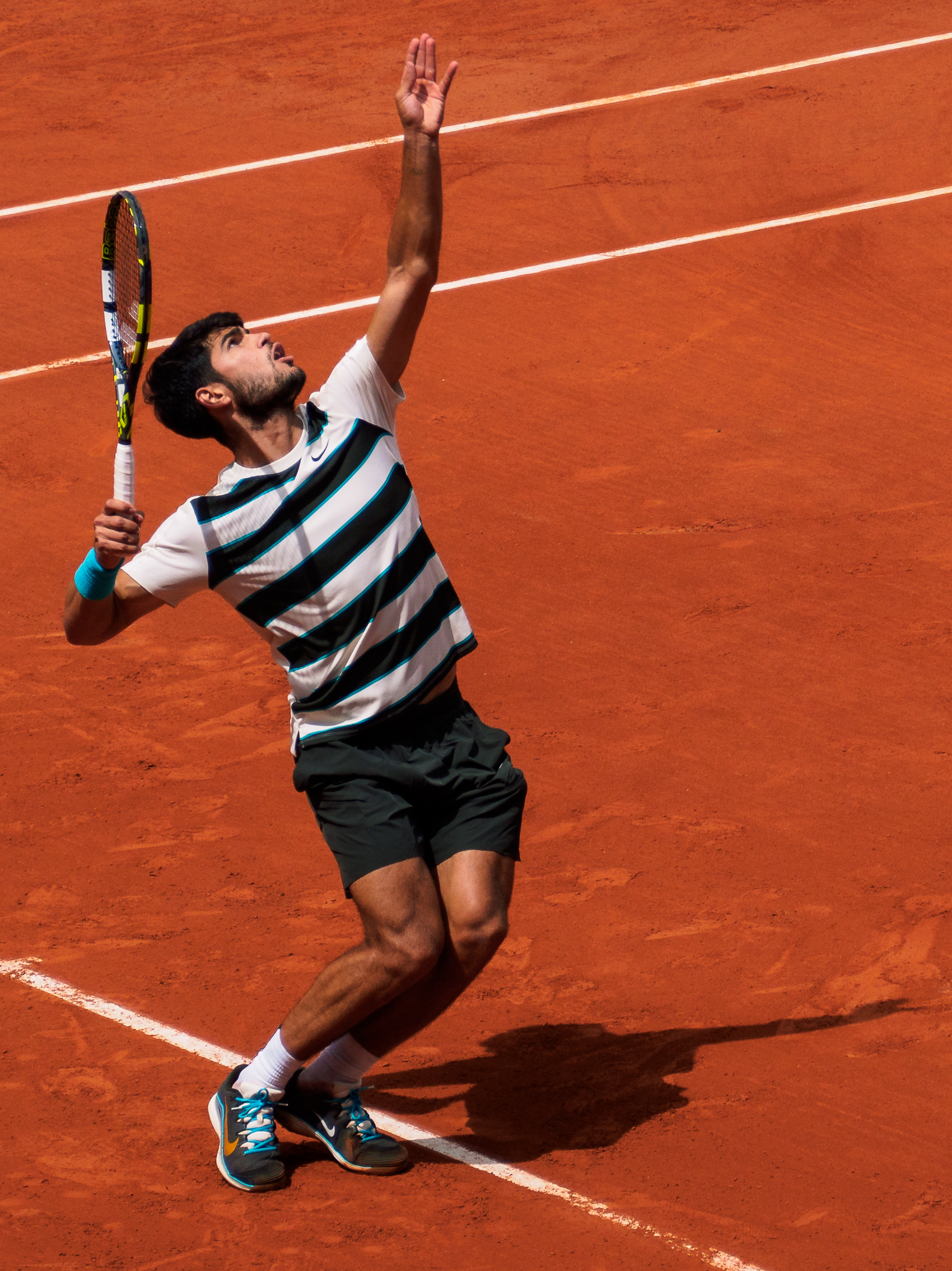
Alcaraz serving at the 2025 French Open

Alcaraz's clay season was much more successful. He began it at the Monte-Carlo Masters, a tournament where he had previously never won a match. Still initially in shaky form, Alcaraz fought through a tight three-setter with Arthur Fils in the quarterfinals. In the final, he defeated Lorenzo Musetti to claim his first ATP Masters 1000 title in thirteen months. Alcaraz comfortably reached the final of the Barcelona Open, where he lost to Holger Rune. Following the final, he announced his withdrawal from the Madrid Open, with injuries to both legs. Alcaraz defeated world No. 1 Jannik Sinner to claim his first Italian Open title. He became the third man to win every modern big title on clay (French Open, Monte-Carlo, Madrid, and Rome) after Rafael Nadal and Novak Djokovic.

Alcaraz met Sinner for a second consecutive big final at the French Open. After winning the first two sets, Sinner had three championship points on Alcaraz's serve in the fourth set. Alcaraz held from 0–40 and then broke Sinner's own serve to win the set. This forced a fifth set, which Alcaraz won with a dominant super tiebreak, thereby claiming his fifth major title. At 5 hours 29 minutes, it was the longest French Open final ever played, and the second longest major final of all time. It was also the first time that Alcaraz had rallied from two sets to love down, and he became the ninth male player to achieve this feat to win a major singles final.. Several writers and sports analysts declared it one of the greatest matches of all time.

Alcaraz began his grass season at the Queen's Club Championships. His semifinal win against Roberto Bautista Agut was his 250th ATP victory; he became the third-fastest man to achieve this milestone in the Open Era. Alcaraz defeated Jiří Lehečka in the final to claim his third consecutive title, and fifth title of the season. In the first round of Wimbledon, Alcaraz was unexpectedly taken to five sets by Fabio Fognini, who had already announced his retirement and had not won a match all season. Alcaraz dropped a set each to Jan-Lennard Struff, Andrey Rublev, and Taylor Fritz, but ultimately still reached his sixth consecutive final. He lost to Jannik Sinner in four sets, his first loss in a slam final and his first loss to Sinner since 2023. This also ended Alcaraz's 24-match win streak, the longest of his career.

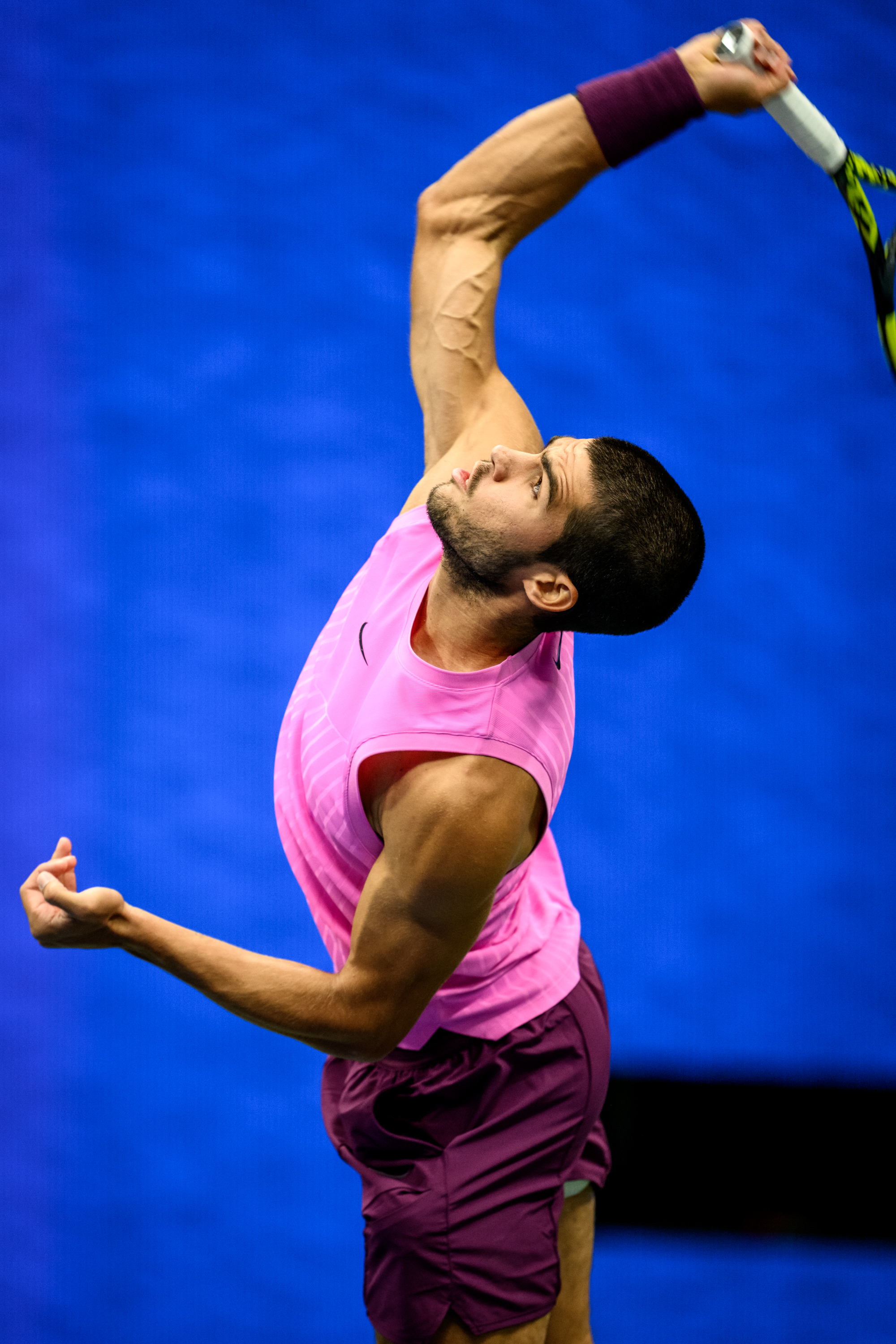
Alcaraz in the final of the 2025 US Open

Alcaraz and Sinner faced off in yet another big final at the Cincinnati Open. Sinner struggled physically, and retired while Alcaraz was leading 5–0 in the first set. Alcaraz therefore claimed his third ATP 1000 title of the season. At the US Open, Alcaraz swept through the first six rounds of competition, bagelling both Mattia Bellucci and Luciano Darderi on the way. In the semifinal, he recorded his first win over Novak Djokovic on hardcourt. Alcaraz reached the final without dropping a single set, the first man to do so at the US Open since Roger Federer in 2015. This was his eighth consecutive tour-level final, and for a third consecutive slam final, he faced Jannik Sinner. Alcaraz defeated him in four sets to claim his sixth major in one of the most dominant runs of all time. He became the fourth and youngest man in the Open Era to win multiple slam titles on each surface. With this victory, Alcaraz also regained the world No. 1 ranking for the first time in two years.

Alcaraz then made his debut at the Japan Open. In the first set of his first round match against Sebastián Báez, he twisted his ankle. Despite the injury, he kept playing to reach his ninth consecutive final, where he faced Taylor Fritz. Having lost to Fritz at the Laver Cup just 10 days prior, Alcaraz swept past him to secure his eighth title of the year. Alcaraz then announced his withdrawal from the Shanghai Masters due to injury. He lost his first match at the Paris Masters to Cameron Norrie in three sets, ending his streak of consecutive finals. At the ATP Finals, Alcaraz defeated Alex de Minaur, Taylor Fritz, and Lorenzo Musetti to top his round robin group. With the win against Musetti, he clinched the year-end No. 1 ranking for the second time. Alcaraz defeated Félix Auger-Aliassime in the semifinal, making only three unforced errors in the first set. He progressed to yet another final against Jannik Sinner, which he lost in straight sets. Alcaraz then announced his withdrawal from the Davis Cup due to a hamstring injury, ending his season.

=== 2026: Career Grand Slam, maiden ATP Finals title, injury ===
During the December preseason, Alcaraz parted ways with longtime coach Juan Carlos Ferrero. Alcaraz began his 2026 season at the 2026 Australian Open, where he reached the semifinals without dropping a set. In the semifinal against Alexander Zverev, he won the first two sets before struggling due to cramps. After dropping the third and fourth sets in a pair of tiebreaks, he resurged to win the decider. At 5 hours and 27 minutes, this was the longest Australian Open semifinal and third-longest overall match in tournament history. Alcaraz became the youngest man in the Open Era to reach the final of all four majors, breaking the record set by Jim Courier in 1993. He then defeated Novak Djokovic to clinch his first Australian Open title, becoming the youngest player in history to complete the Career Grand Slam in men's singles.

Carlos Alcaraz practicing at the 2026 US Open

Alcaraz withdrew from the Rotterdam Open, citing tiredness, and resumed his season at the Qatar Open. He dropped just one set, to Karen Khachanov in the quarterfinal, on his way to the final. He demolished Arthur Fils in 50 minutes, the fastest completed match of his career to date, to claim his second title of the year. Alcaraz then returned to Indian Wells. His quarterfinal victory against Cameron Norrie was his 34th consecutive win on outdoor hardcourts – the third longest-such streak in the Open Era, tied with Pete Sampras. In the semifinal, Alcaraz met Daniil Medvedev for a rematch of the 2023 and 2024 finals, where he lost in straight sets. At the Miami Open, Alcaraz was upset by Sebastian Korda in the third round, concluding a disappointing performance at the Sunshine Double tournaments.

Alcaraz reached the final at his first clay court tournament of the year in Monte Carlo, where he lost the match and the world No. 1 ranking to rival Jannik Sinner. A few days later he played his first match at the Barcelona Open, during which he received a medical timeout to treat his forearm. After the match he withdrew from the tournament, citing an unspecified wrist injury later identified as tenosynovitis. He also withdrew from the Madrid Open. At the end of April, he announced his withdrawal from the Italian Open and the French Open, both tournaments where he was defending champion. In May, he announced his withdrawal from the Queen's Club Championships and Wimbledon, where he was defending champion and runner-up, respectively. He did not enter the Canadian Open, and withdrew from the Cincinnati Open, where he was defending champion.

On August 20, Alcaraz announced he would return to competition at the US Open, where he was also defending champion. He entered the mixed doubles draw in a high-profile partnership with Serena Williams; they lost in the second round. Alcaraz played his first singles match in five months against Roman Safiullin and won in straight sets, although his average serve speed was noticeably reduced. Alcaraz reached his fifth career quarterfinals at the US Open, losing one set on the way, to Jaime Faria. He extended his winning streak at the majors to a personal best 18 matches. Alcaraz then lost to Ben Shelton in the quarterfinals in a fifth set super tiebreak, with Shelton becoming the second player after Matteo Berrettini to defeat Alcaraz in five sets.

After helping Team Europe win the Laver Cup, Alcaraz returned to the Japan Open. Despite a persistent rustiness on serve, he defeated Jiří Lehečka in straight sets to defend his title. He finished the tournament with a 10–0 career record in Tokyo. It was his tenth ATP 500 title, making him the fourth man to reach that total, after Roger Federer, Rafael Nadal and Novak Djokovic. Alcaraz returned to the Shanghai Masters, where he was upset in straight sets by Zizou Bergs in the 3rd round. Subsequently, he accepted a wild card to the Vienna Open, where he defeated Daniil Medvedev in the semifinal and Alex de Minaur in the final, to earn his first title at the tournament and his 26th consecutive win at an ATP 500 event. Alcaraz then competed in the Paris Masters, defeating Ben Shelton in straight sets in the final to claim his first indoor hard court masters title and ninth masters title overall, having saved two match points against Taylor Fritz in the quarterfinals.

== Rivalries ==
=== Jannik Sinner ===
Carlos Alcaraz and Jannik Sinner have faced each other 17 times on the ATP Tour, with Alcaraz leading 10–7.

Notable early matches include the 2022 US Open quarterfinal, which Alcaraz won en route to the title in five sets after saving a match point. The pair met three times in 2024, with Alcaraz winning all three matches, including the tightly contested final of the China Open. Sinner lost as many matches to Alcaraz in 2024 as he did to all other players on tour combined.

In 2025, Alcaraz and Sinner met in three consecutive major finals. Alcaraz won their first major final at the French Open, despite Sinner holding three championship points in the fourth set. The Guardian acclaimed it as "one of the greatest finals ever played, in any sport." They met again at Wimbledon, where Sinner won in four sets, dethroning defending champion Alcaraz; and at the US Open, where Alcaraz won in four sets, dethroning defending champion Sinner. For a second consecutive year, they split the season's slams at two apiece.

They also contested two ATP Masters 1000 finals in 2025, at the Italian Open and the Cincinnati Open, both won by Alcaraz; and the final of the 2025 ATP Finals, where Sinner defeated Alcaraz in straight sets. Sinner defeated Alcaraz in straight sets to claim the title at the Monte-Carlo Masters in their only meeting in 2026. Their rivalry has been described as "potentially era-defining".

=== Alexander Zverev ===
Carlos Alcaraz and Alexander Zverev have faced off fourteen times, with Alcaraz leading 8–6.

They met twice in 2021, with Zverev dismantling a 17–18 year old Alcaraz in both matches. Their first notable match was the final of the Madrid Open in 2022, where Alcaraz swept past defending champion Zverev in one hour and four minutes. A few weeks later they had their first major meeting in the French Open quarterfinals, where Zverev defeated Alcaraz in four sets. They had further high profile encounters in the quarterfinals of the 2023 US Open, won by Alcaraz, and the quarterfinals of the 2024 Australian Open, won by Zverev.

In 2024 they met for the French Open final, where Zverev was hunting for his first major title. Zverev took a two-sets-to-one lead, but Alcaraz outlasted him to win in five sets and claim his first French Open title.

In the semifinals of the 2026 Australian Open, Alcaraz took a two-set lead before struggling due to cramps. Zverev won the next two sets in a pair of tiebreaks, but Alcaraz recovered in time to win the fifth set, proceeding to his maiden Australian Open final. At 5 hours and 27 minutes, this was the longest Australian Open semifinal in history.

=== Novak Djokovic ===
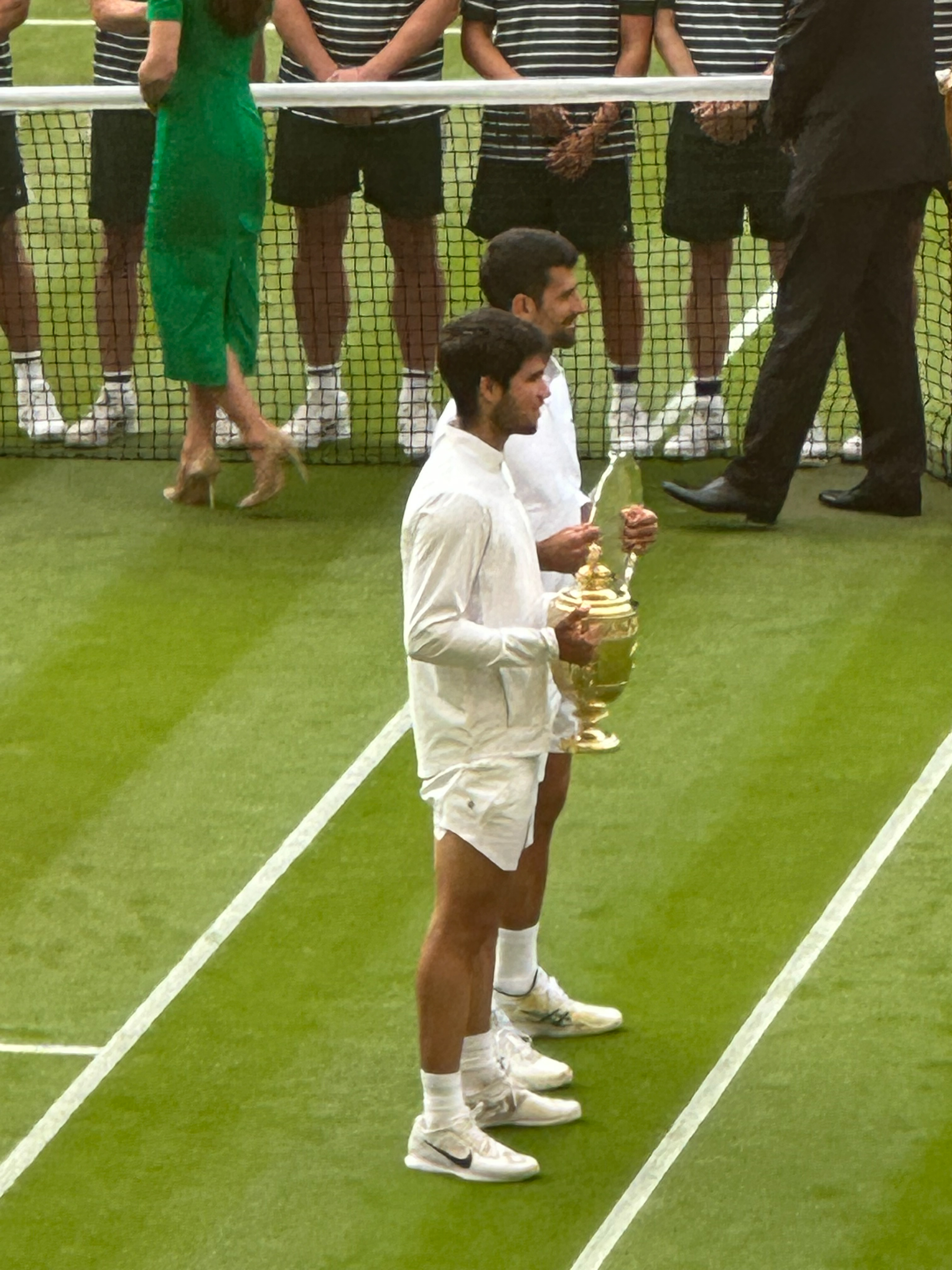
Carlos Alcaraz and Novak Djokovic after the 2023 Wimbledon final

Carlos Alcaraz and Novak Djokovic have faced off ten times; despite a 16-year age gap, their rivalry has remained competitive, with the head-to-head tied at 5–5. Nine of their ten matches have been in the semifinals or finals of "big" tournaments: at all four majors, two ATP Masters 1000, the ATP Finals and the Olympics.

Their first meeting was at the 2022 Madrid Open semifinals, where Alcaraz prevailed in a deciding set tiebreaker, becoming the only man ever to secure back-to-back victories against Nadal and Djokovic on clay. Despite their ongoing fight over the world No. 1 ranking, they did not meet again for over a year. They finally faced off in the semifinals of the 2023 French Open, a highly anticipated showdown heavily promoted by the media. Djokovic won in four sets, with the match competitive until Alcaraz faltered at the start of the third set due to cramps.

The duo soon met for a rematch in the 2023 Wimbledon final, in which Alcaraz defeated four-time defending champion Djokovic in an epic five-setter that lasted 4 hours and 42 minutes. One month later, they fought another epic at the 2023 Cincinnati Open final, with Djokovic prevailing in three tightly contested sets after saving a championship point. At 3 hours and 49 minutes, this was the longest best-of-three-sets ATP Tour final in history, the longest match in the tournament's history, and was immediately heralded as one of the best matches ever. They then played a relatively uncompetitive match at the ATP Finals, where Djokovic overpowered Alcaraz in straight sets.

Djokovic and Alcaraz met twice in the summer of 2024, both in high-profile finals. On July 14, Alcaraz cruised to victory in straight sets against Djokovic in a rematch of the previous year's Wimbledon final. Three weeks later, on August 4, Djokovic defeated Alcaraz in the Olympics final on Court Philippe Chatrier. Neither player was broken on serve across two sets, with Djokovic winning both tiebreaks. Sports historian Steve Flink called it "the best two-set match I have ever seen". Tennis.com listed it as its ATP match of the year for 2024.

Djokovic and Alcaraz met twice in 2025. In their first quarterfinal-level meeting at the Australian Open, Djokovic prevailed in four sets to retain his unbeaten record against Alcaraz on hardcourt and deny his hopes of achieving the Career Grand Slam. They met for a rematch in the semifinals of the US Open, where Alcaraz took revenge in straight sets to record his first win over Djokovic on hardcourt. Tickets to the match were the most expensive in US Open history. With this match, Alcaraz and Djokovic completed a set of meetings at each of the four majors, something that the Federer–Nadal rivalry never achieved.

Djokovic and Alcaraz met once in 2026, in the final of the Australian Open, which Alcaraz won in four sets to end Djokovic's undefeated 10–0 record in Australian Open finals and become the youngest male player to complete the Career Grand Slam. Notably, Alcaraz (along with Stan Wawrinka) is one of two tennis players to hold a perfect major final record against Djokovic.

== Playing style ==
Alcaraz is an all-court tennis player, but primarily employs an aggressive baseline style of play. He is known for his exceptional court coverage and defensive retrieval ability, often turning defensive positions into offensive opportunities during rallies. His straight-armed forehand is typically his most potent shot: he can either hit it flat and fast for winners from every court position, or add a great amount of topspin and margin over the net. He plays with a flatter and lower two-handed backhand. Due to his aggression, Alcaraz typically generates a high count of both winners and unforced errors off his groundstrokes, particularly his forehand.

Alcaraz has a powerful first serve for his height; commonly around 115 to 120 mph and as high as 135 mph, but hit with average placement. Alcaraz often adds topspin to his second serve in order to generate a high bounce, which either pushes his opponents back or forces a weak return. This serve typically reaches 150 to 170 km/h (93 to 106 mph). Due mostly to its lack of targeted placement, Alcaraz's serve is often described as a relative weak spot in his game. He is a top returner, particularly of first serves. In 2024, he won nearly a third of his opponents' service games.

Alcaraz has an impressive net-game with excellent drop volleys and drive volleys, and frequently serves-and-volleys on crucial points. His greatly disguised drop shot is key to his game. The heaviness of his groundstrokes pushes his opponents to the back of the court, which then makes his drop shots difficult to reach. His slight preference for forehand over backhand drop shots has been noted as unusual. Andy Roddick has said that the Alcaraz drop shot is "the best in the history of tennis". Some players and commentators have credited Alcaraz as responsible for rising drop shot usage across both professional tours in recent years.

Alcaraz has earned acclaim for his athletic and physical traits. His direct sprints, counterattacking abilities, and an extremely high peak footspeed have garnered him comparisons to Rafael Nadal. He has been compared to Novak Djokovic for his assured lateral movement and court-coverage, aided by physical splits and sliding through the court on defense, particularly on the backhand side. Like Roger Federer, exceptional touch and shotmaking have been crucial to his success. Djokovic has said Alcaraz combines "the best of all three worlds" from his game, Federer's, and Nadal's.

Alcaraz is frequently lauded for his on-court creativity and showmanship. He has been described many times as a "human highlight reel". In 2023, he said, "Obviously, I want to win every match that I play, but at the same time, I want to have fun, try different things, make the people enjoy watching tennis and watching my matches. Sometimes I talk to myself about what is most important: if I win or doing great things."

== Coaches and team ==
Alcaraz's childhood coaches were Kiko Navarro and Carlos Santos. In September 2018, fifteen-year-old Alcaraz moved to Villena to begin training at the Ferrero Tennis Academy under the direction of Juan Carlos Ferrero, who became his personal coach. Ferrero turned down several coaching requests from top players in order to coach Alcaraz. Their partnership was widely praised: Ferrero won the ATP Coach of the Year Award in 2022 and 2025. In December 2025, Alcaraz unexpectedly announced that he and Ferrero had parted ways after seven years.

In December 2024, it was announced that Samuel López, a former member of Ferrero's own coaching team, would be joining Alcaraz's team to work under Ferrero as a second coach. Following Ferrero's departure, he became Alcaraz's head coach for the 2026 season.

Alcaraz has maintained largely the same staff since he arrived on tour. His team includes physical trainer Alberto Lledó, physiotherapist Juanjo Moreno, doctor Juanjo López, and agent Albert Molina. His brother Álvaro works as his longtime hitting partner and, as of 2026, assistant coach. In 2025, Alcaraz appointed childhood friend Fran Rubio as an additional physiotherapist. Alcaraz also works with sports psychologist Isabel Balaguer.

== Off the court ==
=== Endorsements ===
Alcaraz is sponsored by Nike for clothing and shoes, and by Babolat for racquets. He plays with the Babolat Pure Aero 98 racquet, with RPM Team strings. In January 2022, Alcaraz became a brand ambassador for Rolex. In January 2023, he starred in American clothing brand Calvin Klein's 1996 underwear campaign. In June 2023, he became a brand ambassador for Louis Vuitton. Alcaraz is also a brand ambassador for Brazilian bank Itaú, Spanish dermocosmetics company Isdin, Spanish food company ElPozo, and German automobile manufacturer BMW under their BMW Spain division.

In June 2025, Alcaraz became an ambassador for multinational food company Danone. The same month, he was announced as an ambassador for French mineral water brand Evian, which is owned by Danone. In July 2025, he was announced as the brand ambassador for YoPRO, a high protein yoghurt brand also under Danone's portfolio, and its sister brand Oikos. In February 2026, Alcaraz's longtime sponsor Babolat announced a commercial range of "Carlitos Junior" racquets and bags for young tennis players. In March 2026, Alcaraz became a brand ambassador for Sunreef Yachts, and purchased an Ultima 88 catamaran, on the advice of fellow brand ambassador Rafael Nadal. In April 2026, he was announced as a brand ambassador for Indian multinational technology company Infosys, which also supplies tennis data to the ATP. In May 2026, he became an ambassador for Ant International, the Singapore-based payments and fintech arm of China-based Ant Group.

In August 2025, Forbes estimated that Alcaraz was the highest-paid active tennis player, combining endorsements and prize money, for the second year running. Sportico estimated that Alcaraz was the world's tenth highest-paid athlete from endorsements (excluding prize money) in 2025.

=== In the media and popular culture ===
Alcaraz made appearances in both seasons of Netflix's Break Point docuseries, and played against Rafael Nadal in The Netflix Slam, a live-streamed tennis match hosted by MGM Resorts International on March 3, 2024. Alcaraz was the subject of the Netflix show Carlos Alcaraz: My Way, which documented his 2024 season and was released April 23, 2025. The three-part series focused on conflict between Alcaraz and his team as he attempted to balance his ambition to make tennis history with the normal life of a 21-year-old. It included appearances by Rafael Nadal, Roger Federer, Garbiñe Muguruza, Martina Navratilova, Andre Agassi, Björn Borg, and John McEnroe alongside other tennis greats.

In April 2025, Barney Ronay for The Guardian described Alcaraz as "arguably the most interesting athlete in the world right now". He is known for his wide smile and charisma on the court. He has received significant media attention off the court for his personal life, particularly his trips to Ibiza. Alcaraz's style choices, particularly his unplanned buzz cut at the 2025 US Open and his subsequent blonde dye job, have also generated outsize media attention. He is known for receiving tattoos to commemorate his slam victories. The New York Times selected him as one of its "most stylish people" of 2025, and GQ as one of the most stylish male tennis players of all time. At the 2026 US Open, Nike launched the Cactus Jack x Carlos Alcaraz Performance Collection in collaboration with Alcaraz and rapper Travis Scott, which Alcaraz wore on court.

In 2024, a media controversy arose when Alcaraz publicly broke a racket for the first time during a match in Cincinnati. He afterwards delivered a public apology. Alcaraz is also known for his willingness to discuss mental health with the media. After his loss in the 2024 US Open, he stated, "I've taken steps backwards, like I'm not doing well mentally, I'm not strong. I don't know how to control myself when faced with problems and I don't know how to handle it." Following a loss at Indian Wells in 2025, he admitted to having felt "nervous the whole day", and following a win in Monte Carlo a month later, that he had been "struggling stepping on the court" and had considered taking an extended break from tennis. Various commentators, including Andy Roddick, Boris Becker, and Andrea Petkovic, have highlighted his unusual candidness about mental health.

Alcaraz has often advocated for professional tennis players' welfare. In 2024, he spoke out several times against the length of the tennis calendar, stressing the frequency of injuries and joking that "probably they are going to kill us in some way". In 2025, he supported fellow Spanish player Sara Sorribes Tormo's decision to take a break from the sport for her health. He also signed two letters alongside other top men's and women's tennis players asking that the four major tournaments distribute a greater share of their revenue to all competing players. In 2026, after returning from injury, he once again criticised the tennis schedule and announced his intention to take one or two month breaks during future seasons.

Alcaraz has often been compared to his compatriot Rafael Nadal, particularly in their native Spain. As a teenager, he was dubbed "baby Rafa" or "young Nadal". However, he and Nadal have both dismissed these comparisons at length.

Alcaraz was featured on the Time 100 Next list in 2022. In December 2025, he was included on the 50 Names in the Boardroom list.

=== Philanthropy ===
In April 2024, Alcaraz announced the launch of the Carlos Alcaraz Garfia Foundation, with the aim of improving the lives of disadvantaged children. It is headquartered in El Palmar and operates in partnership with local schools. Alcaraz's foundation provided buses to transport volunteers after the flash floods in Valencia in 2024, during which Alcaraz and Juan Carlos Ferrero also ran a charity auction to raise funds for those affected. On December 12, 2024, Alcaraz inaugurated his foundation's exhibition "Los Pies en la Tierra" in Murcia, highlighting the importance of equal opportunities for children. The exhibition travelled to other areas of Spain, including Madrid and Seville, in 2025 and 2026.

=== Involvement in other sports ===
Alcaraz is a football fan who supports the Spanish club Real Madrid. In 2026 he presented the FIFA World Cup Trophy for Louis Vuitton prior to the Spain–Argentina final. He is known for his vocal support of many other Spanish athletes, including Formula One driver Fernando Alonso and Georgian-Spanish MMA fighter Ilia Topuria. Alcaraz is also a keen player of golf and of chess. In 2023, Chess.com created a dedicated Carlos Alcaraz bot that any user can challenge virtually on the platform.

== Career statistics ==
=== Grand Slam tournament performance timeline ===
Key
W	F	SF	QF	#R	RR	Q#	DNQ	A	NH

(W) winner; (F) finalist; (SF) semifinalist; (QF) quarterfinalist; (#R) rounds 4, 3, 2, 1; (RR) round-robin stage; (Q#) qualification round; (DNQ) did not qualify; (A) absent; (NH) not held; (SR) strike rate (events won / competed); (W–L) win–loss record.
To avoid confusion and double counting, these charts are updated at the conclusion of a tournament or when the player's participation has ended.

Current through the 2026 US Open.

Tournament	2020	2021	2022	2023	2024	2025	2026	SR	W–L	Win %
Australian Open	A	2R	3R	A	QF	QF	W	1 / 5	18–4	82%
French Open	Q1	3R	QF	SF	W	W	A	2 / 5	25–3	89%
Wimbledon	NH	2R	4R	W	W	F	A	2 / 5	24–3	89%
US Open	A	QF	W	SF	2R	W	QF	2 / 6	28–4	88%
Win–loss	0–0	8–4	16–3	17–2	19–2	24–2	11–1	7 / 21	95–14	87%

=== Grand Slam tournament finals ===
==== Singles: 8 (7 titles, 1 runner-up) ====
Result	Year	Tournament	Surface	Opponent	Score
Win	2022	US Open	Hard	(Norway) Casper Ruud	6–4, 2–6, 7–6^{(7–1)}, 6–3
Win	2023	Wimbledon	Grass	(Serbia) Novak Djokovic	1–6, 7–6^{(8–6)}, 6–1, 3–6, 6–4
Win	2024	French Open	Clay	(Germany) Alexander Zverev	6–3, 2–6, 5–7, 6–1, 6–2
Win	2024	Wimbledon (2)	Grass	(Serbia) Novak Djokovic	6–2, 6–2, 7–6^{(7–4)}
Win	2025	French Open (2)	Clay	(Italy) Jannik Sinner	4–6, 6–7^{(4–7)}, 6–4, 7–6^{(7–3)}, 7–6^{(10–2)}
Loss	2025	Wimbledon	Grass	(Italy) Jannik Sinner	6–4, 4–6, 4–6, 4–6
Win	2025	US Open (2)	Hard	(Italy) Jannik Sinner	6–2, 3–6, 6–1, 6–4
Win	2026	Australian Open	Hard	(Serbia) Novak Djokovic	2–6, 6–2, 6–3, 7–5

=== ATP Finals performance timeline ===
Tournament	2020	2021	2022	2023	2024	2025	2026	SR	W–L	Win %
ATP Finals	DNQ		A (Note: Qualified but did not compete due to injury)	SF	RR	F	W	1 / 4	12–5	71%

=== ATP Finals ===
==== Singles: 2 (1 title, 1 runner-up) ====
Result	Year	Tournament	Surface	Opponent	Score
Loss	2025	ATP Finals	Hard (i)	(Italy) Jannik Sinner	6–7^{(4–7)}, 5–7
Win	2026	ATP Finals	Hard (i)	(Germany) Alexander Zverev	6–2, 7–6^{(9–7)}

=== Summer Olympics ===
==== Singles: 1 (silver medal) ====
Result	Year	Tournament	Surface	Opponent	Score
Loss	2024	Paris Olympics	Clay	(Serbia) Novak Djokovic	6–7^{(3–7)}, 6–7^{(2–7)}

== Records ==
=== All-time records ===
Event	Since	Record accomplished	Players matched
**Grand Slam tournaments**	1877	Won two majors after saving 1+ match points	Rod Laver; Novak Djokovic
**Grand Slam tournaments**	1877	Youngest male player to complete a Career Grand Slam – 22 years, 272 days	**Stands alone**

=== Open Era records ===
- These records were attained in the Open Era of tennis and in ATP Masters 1000 tournaments since 1990.
- Records in **bold** indicate peerless achievements.

Time span	Record accomplished	Players matched
2021	Youngest US Open men's quarterfinalist – 18 years, 123 days	**Stands alone**
2022	Youngest ATP 500 tournament winner – 18 years, 292 days	**Stands alone**
2022	Youngest male player to win the Miami Open – 18 years, 333 days	**Stands alone**
2022	Youngest male player to win the Madrid Open – 19 years, 3 days	**Stands alone**
2022	Youngest player to become ATP world No. 1 – 19 years, 130 days	**Stands alone**
2022	Youngest ATP year-end No. 1 – 19 years, 201 days	**Stands alone**
2023	Played the longest best-of-three final by duration (3 hours, 49 minutes)	Novak Djokovic
2024	Youngest male player to win major singles titles on clay, grass and hard court – 21 years, 35 days	**Stands alone**
2024	Youngest male player to complete the Channel Slam – 21 years, 70 days Winning French Open and Wimbledon in a calendar year	**Stands alone**
2024	Youngest Olympic finalist in men's singles – 21 years, 89 days	**Stands alone**
2024	First player to win ATP 500 singles titles on clay, grass and hard court	**Stands alone**
2025	First player to win ATP 500 singles titles on clay, grass, indoor and outdoor hard court	**Stands alone**
2025	Youngest player to win ATP singles titles on clay, grass, indoor and outdoor hard court – 21 years, 280 days	**Stands alone**
2025	Saved 3+ championship points to win a major final	**Stands alone**
2025	Winner of a major final from two sets down	Björn Borg; Ivan Lendl; Andre Agassi; Gastón Gaudio; Dominic Thiem; Novak Djokovic; Rafael Nadal; Jannik Sinner
2025	Played the longest French Open final by duration (5 hours, 29 minutes)	Jannik Sinner
2025	Youngest male player to win all Big American Titles – 22 years, 105 days Winning US Open, Indian Wells, Miami Open, and Cincinnati Open in a career	**Stands alone**
2025	Youngest male player to reach three consecutive major singles finals – 22 years, 123 days	**Stands alone**
2025	Youngest male player to complete a double career Surface Slam – 22 years, 125 days Winning multiple majors on every surface in a career	**Stands alone**
2026	Youngest male player to reach a final at every major tournament – 22 years, 270 days	**Stands alone**
2026	Youngest male player to reach 4 consecutive major singles finals – 22 years, 270 days	**Stands alone**
2026	Youngest male player to complete the Career Grand Slam – 22 years, 272 days	**Stands alone**
2026	Youngest male player to win seven major singles titles – 22 years, 272 days	**Stands alone**
2026	Youngest player to complete the Parisian Double – 23 years, 187 days Winning French Open and Paris Masters in a career	**Stands alone**
2026	Youngest male player to win all four major tournaments and the Tour Finals – 23 years, 201 days	**Stands alone**

== Awards and honours ==
Alcaraz has received the following awards and honours:

Professional awards

- ATP Newcomer of the Year – 2020
- 2× ATP No. 1 – 2022, 2025
- ATP Most Improved Player – 2022
- 2× Stefan Edberg Sportsmanship Award – 2023, 2025
- ATP Hot Shot of the Year – 2025
- ITWA Player Ambassador Award – 2025

Media awards

- Best Tennis Player ESPY Award – 2026
- 3× Sports Press Association of the Region of Murcia — Best Male Athlete of the Year – 2021, (Note: Shared with Pedro Acosta.) 2024, 2025
- Spanish Sportsman of the Year – 2022
- Laureus World Breakthrough of the Year – 2023
- Laureus World Sportsman of the Year – 2026

Honors

- Gold Medal of the Region of Murcia (Medalla d'Or de la Región de Murcia) – 2022
- Time 100 Next Selection (Phenoms) – 2022
- Forbes 30 Under 30 Selection (Europe – Sports & Games) – 2023
- Hijo Predilecto del Municipio de Murcia – 2023
- King Felipe Award (Premio Rey Felipe) – 2024
- Forbes list of the world's top-10 highest-paid tennis players – 2025 (#1)

== See also ==
- List of ATP number 1 ranked singles tennis players (since 1973)
- Top ten ranked male tennis players
- List of Grand Slam men's singles champions
- World number 1 ranked male tennis players (all time, based on recognized tennis authorities)
- ATP Awards
- Tennis in Spain

== Notes ==
Sporting positions
Preceded by Daniil Medvedev; Novak Djokovic; Novak Djokovic; Novak Djokovic; Jannik Sinner; Jannik Sinner	World No. 1; 12 September 2022 – 29 January 2023; 20 March 2023 – 2 April 2023; 22 May 2023 – 11 June 2023; 26 June 2023 – 10 September 2023; 8 September 2025 – 2 November 2025; 10 November 2025 – 12 April 2026	Succeeded by Novak Djokovic; Novak Djokovic; Novak Djokovic; Novak Djokovic; Jannik Sinner; Jannik Sinner
Awards
Preceded by Jannik Sinner	ATP Newcomer of the Year; 2020	Succeeded by Jenson Brooksby
Preceded by Aslan Karatsev	ATP Most Improved Player of the Year; 2022	Succeeded by Jannik Sinner
Preceded by Jon Rahm	Spanish Sportsman of the Year; 2022	Succeeded by Incumbent
Preceded by Emma Raducanu	Laureus World Breakthrough of the Year; 2023	Succeeded by Jude Bellingham
Preceded by Casper Ruud; Grigor Dimitrov	ATP Stefan Edberg Sportsmanship Award; 2023; 2025	Succeeded by Grigor Dimitrov; Incumbent
Preceded by Mondo Duplantis	Laureus World Sportsman of the Year; 2026	Succeeded by Incumbent
