= 2023 ATP Finals =

- Date: 12–19 November
- Edition: 54th (singles) / 49th (doubles)
- Category: ATP Finals
- Draw: 8S/8D
- Prize money: $15,000,000
- Surface: Hard (indoor)
- Location: Turin, Italy
- Venue: Pala Alpitour

Champions

Singles
- (Serbia) Novak Djokovic

Doubles
- (United States) Rajeev Ram / (United Kingdom) Joe Salisbury
- ATP Finals

The 2023 ATP Finals (also known as the 2023 Nitto ATP Finals for Nitto sponsorship) was a men's tennis year-end tournament played on indoor hard courts at the Pala Alpitour in Turin, Italy, from 12 to 19 November 2023. It was the season-ending event for the highest-ranked singles players and doubles teams on the 2023 ATP Tour.

This is the 54th edition of the tournament (49th in doubles), and the third time Turin hosted the ATP Tour year-end championships.

== Champions ==
=== Singles ===
- (Serbia) Novak Djokovic def. (Italy) Jannik Sinner, 6–3, 6–3

=== Doubles ===
- (United States) Rajeev Ram / (United Kingdom) Joe Salisbury def. (Spain) Marcel Granollers / (Argentina) Horacio Zeballos, 6–3, 6–4

== Points and prize money ==
The 2023 ATP Finals rewarded the following points and prize money, per victory

| Stage | Singles | Doubles (Note: Prize money for doubles is per team.) | Points |
|---|---|---|---|
| Final win | $2,201,000 | $351,000 | 500 |
| Semi-final win | $1,105,000 | $175,650 | 400 |
| Round robin match win | $390,000 | $95,000 | 200 |
| Participation fee | 3 matches = $325,500; 2 matches = $244,125; 1 match = $162,750 | 3 matches = $132,000; 2 matches = $99,000; 1 match = $66,000 | —N/a |
| Alternates | $152,500 | $50,850 | —N/a |

- An undefeated champion would earn the maximum 1,500 points, and $4,801,500 in singles or $943,650 in doubles.

== Format ==
The ATP Finals group stage has a round-robin format, with eight players/teams divided into two groups of four and each player/team in a group playing the other three in the group. The eight seeds were determined by the Pepperstone ATP rankings and ATP Doubles Team Rankings on the Monday after the last ATP Tour tournament of the calendar year. All singles matches, including the final, were best of three sets with tie-breaks in each set including the third. All doubles matches were two sets (no ad) and a Match Tie-break.

In deciding placement within a group, the following criteria were used, in order:

1. Most wins.
2. Most matches played (e.g., a 2–1 record beats a 2–0 record).
3. Head-to-head result between tied players/teams.
4. Highest percentage of sets won.
5. Highest percentage of games won.
6. ATP rank after the last ATP Tour tournament of the year.

If after criterion 4 there was one superior/inferior player and the other two were tied, the head-to-head result was used to sort these two players. Criteria 5-6 were thus used only in case three players were all tied after the evaluation of criteria 1-4.

The top two of each group advanced to semifinals, with the winner of each group playing the runner-up of the other group. The winners of the semifinals then played for the title.

== Qualification ==
=== Singles ===
Eight players compete at the tournament, with two named alternates. Players receive places in the following order of precedence:

1. First, the top 7 players in the ATP Race to Turin after the final week of the ATP Tour on 11 November 2023
2. Second, up to two 2023 Grand Slam tournament winners ranked anywhere 8th–20th, in ranking order
3. Third, the eighth ranked player in the ATP rankings

In the event of this totaling more than 8 players, those lower down in the selection order become the alternates. If further alternates are needed, these players are selected by the ATP.

Provisional rankings are published weekly as the ATP Race to Turin, coinciding with the 52-week rolling ATP rankings on the date of selection. Points are accumulated in Grand Slam, ATP Tour, United Cup, ATP Challenger Tour and ITF Tour tournaments. Players accrue points across 19 tournaments, usually made up of:

- The 4 Grand Slam tournaments
- The 8 mandatory ATP Masters 1000 tournaments
- The best results from any 7 other tournaments that carry ranking points (Monte-Carlo Masters, United Cup, ATP 500, ATP 250, Challenger, ITF)
- Player can replace up to 3 mandatory Masters 1000 results with a better score from ATP 500 or ATP 250

=== Doubles ===
Eight teams compete at the tournament, with one named alternate. The eight competing teams receive places according to the same order of precedence as in singles. The named alternate will be offered first to any unaccepted teams in the selection order, then to the highest ranked unaccepted team, and then to a team selected by the ATP. Points are accumulated in the same competitions as for the singles tournament. However, for Doubles teams there are no commitment tournaments, so teams are ranked according to their 19 highest points scoring results from any tournaments on the ATP Tour.

== Groupings ==
=== Singles ===
The singles draw of the 2023 edition of the Year–end Championships will feature three number ones, three major champions and two major finalists. The competitors were divided into two groups.

Green Group
(Serbia) Novak Djokovic [1]
(Italy) Jannik Sinner [4]
(Greece) Stefanos Tsitsipas [6]
(Denmark) Holger Rune [8]
Tsitsipas injury – November 12

(Poland) Hubert Hurkacz [9]

| class="col-break " style=" padding-left: 4em;" |

Red Group
(Spain) Carlos Alcaraz [2]
Daniil Medvedev [3]
Andrey Rublev [5]
(Germany) Alexander Zverev [7]

=== Doubles ===
The doubles draw of the 2023 edition of the Year–end Championships will feature six major champions, six number ones and 1 major finalist team. The pairs were divided into two groups.

Green Group
(Croatia) Ivan Dodig / (United States) Austin Krajicek [1]
(Mexico) Santiago González / (France) Édouard Roger-Vasselin [4]
(Spain) Marcel Granollers / (Argentina) Horacio Zeballos [5]
(Argentina) Máximo González / (Argentina) Andrés Molteni [7]

| class="col-break " style=" padding-left: 4em;" |

Red Group
(Netherlands) Wesley Koolhof / (United Kingdom) Neal Skupski [2]
(India) Rohan Bopanna / (Australia) Matthew Ebden [3]
(United States) Rajeev Ram / (United Kingdom) Joe Salisbury [6]
(Australia) Rinky Hijikata / (Australia) Jason Kubler [8]

== Qualified players ==
=== Singles ===
| # | Players | Points | Date qualified |
|---|---|---|---|
| 1 | (Serbia) Novak Djokovic | 9,945 | 19 August |
| 2 | (Spain) Carlos Alcaraz | 8,455 | 17 July |
| 3 | Daniil Medvedev | 7,200 | 5 September |
| 4 | (Italy) Jannik Sinner | 5,490 | 7 October |
| 5 | Andrey Rublev | 4,805 | 26 October |
| 6 | (Greece) Stefanos Tsitsipas | 4,235 | 2 November |
| 7 | (Germany) Alexander Zverev | 3,585 | 3 November |
| 8 | (Denmark) Holger Rune | 3,460 | 3 November |
Tsitsipas withdrew due to injury.
| 9 | (Poland) Hubert Hurkacz | 3,245 | 13 November |

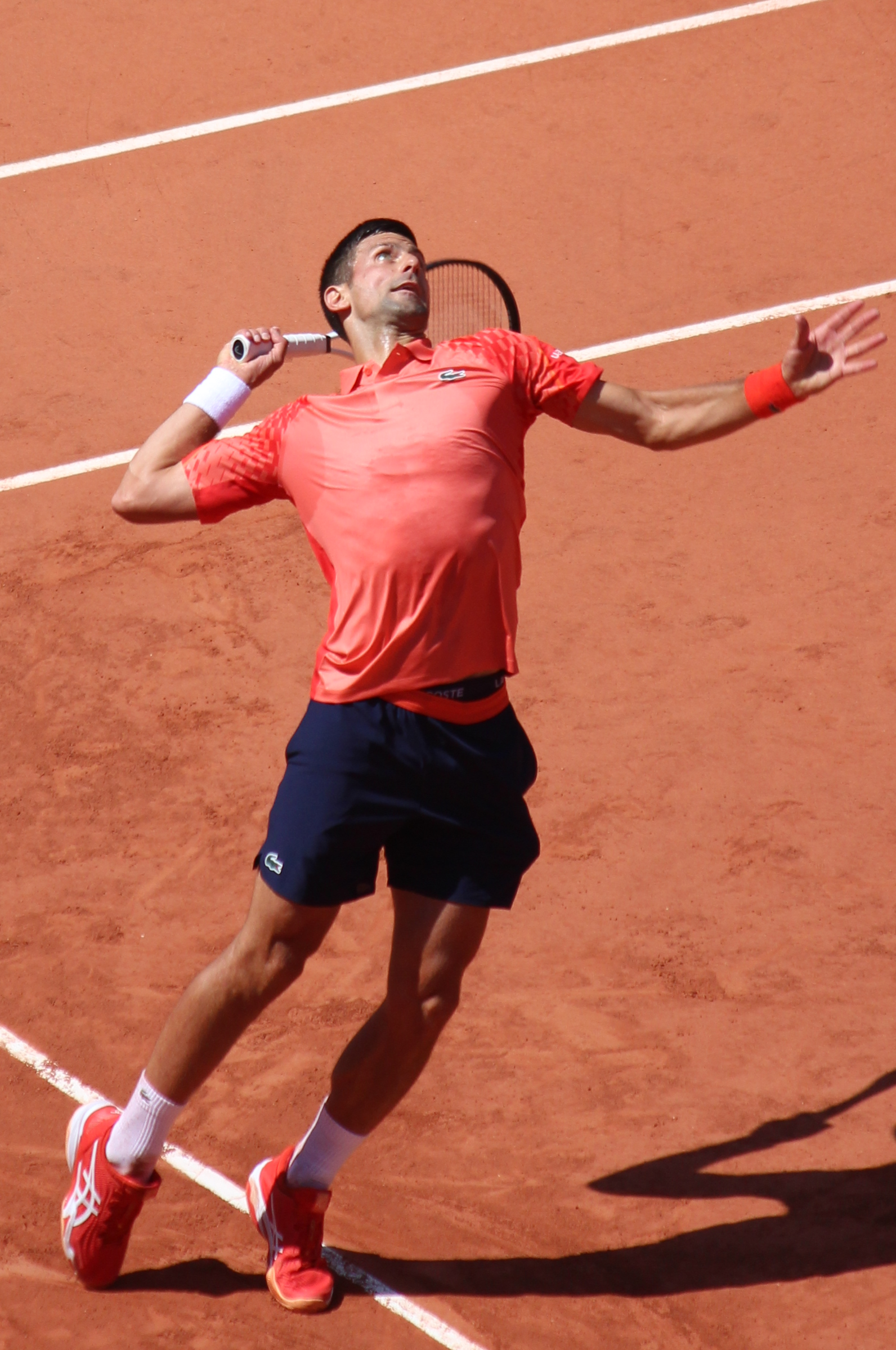
Djokovic

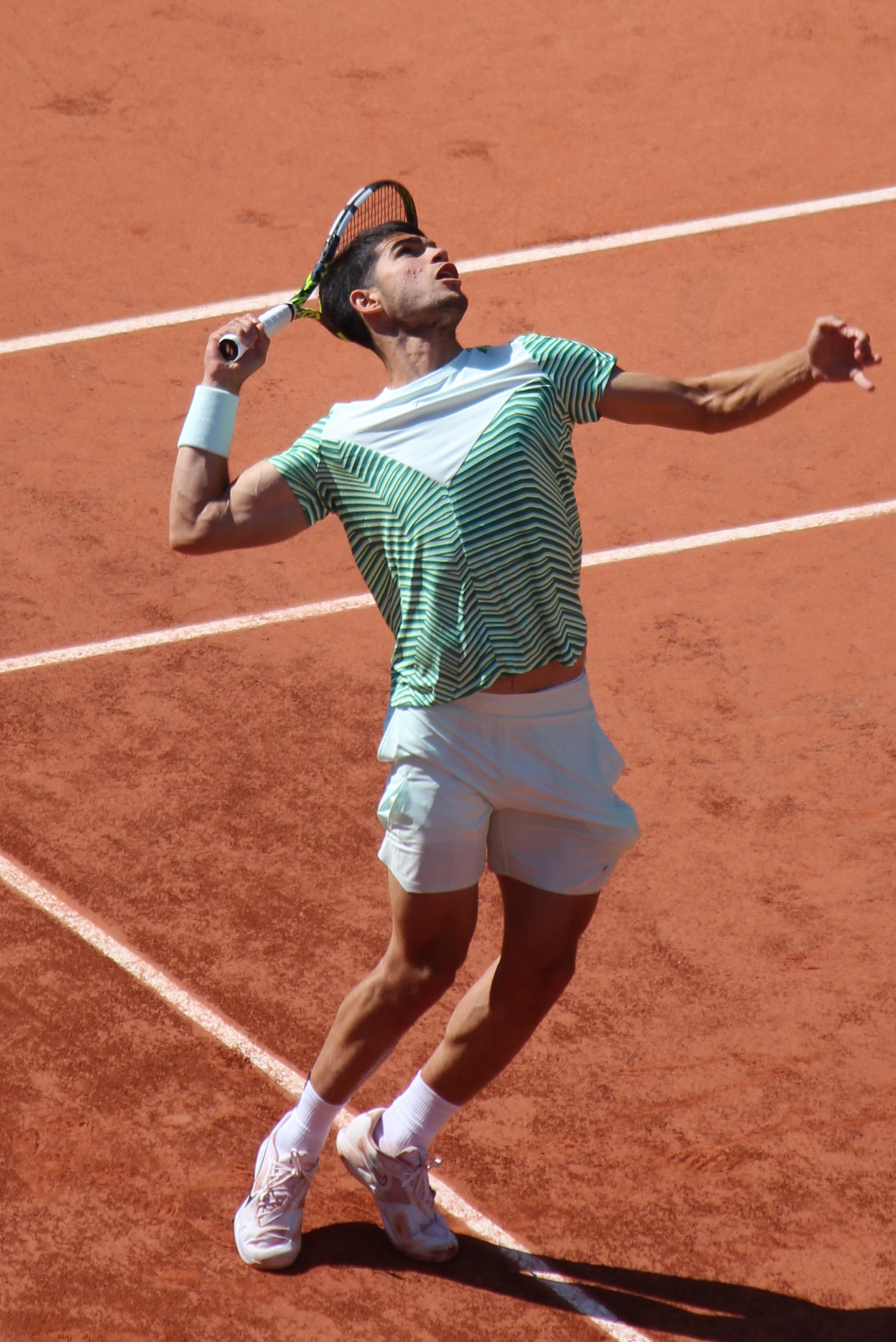
Alcaraz

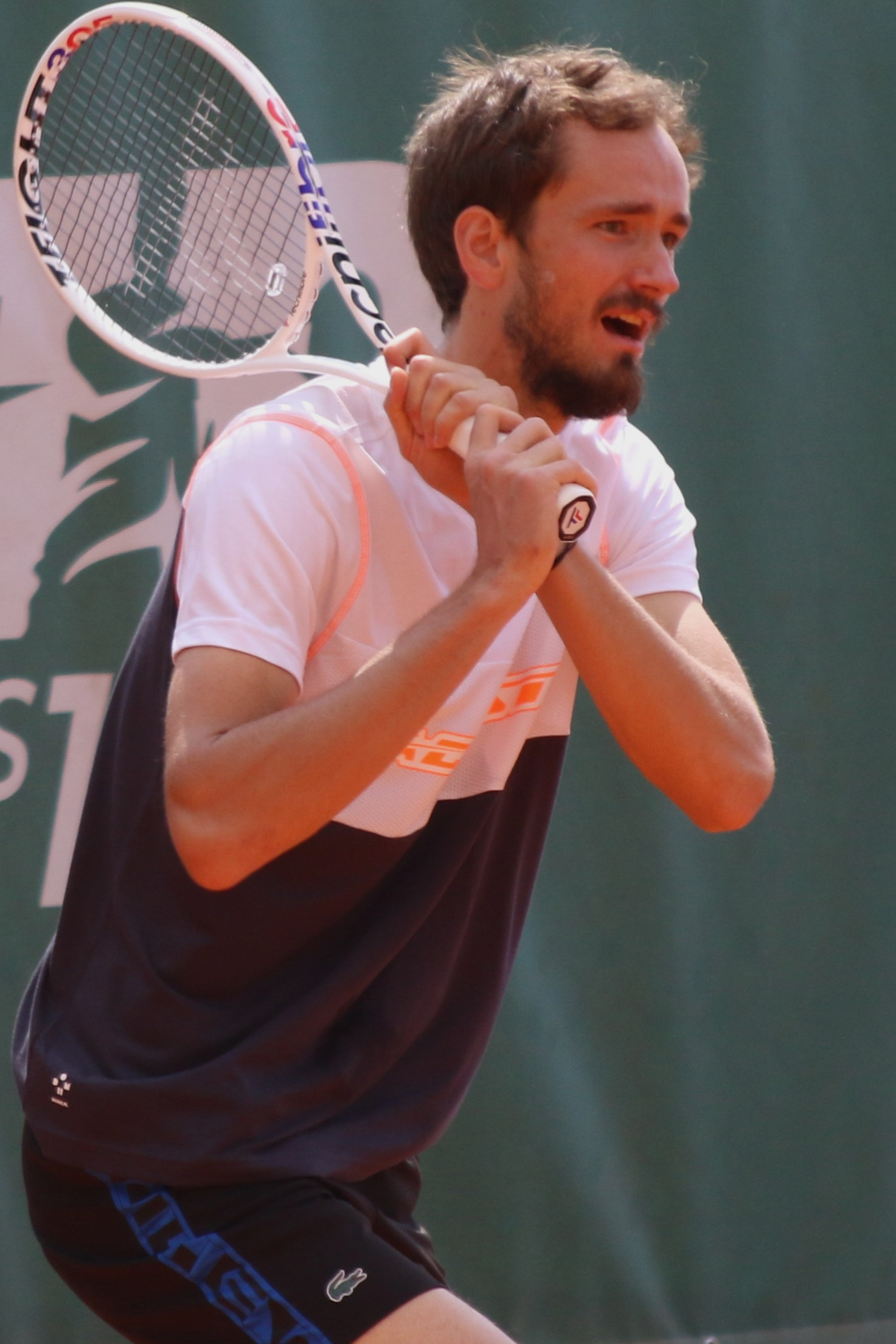
Medvedev

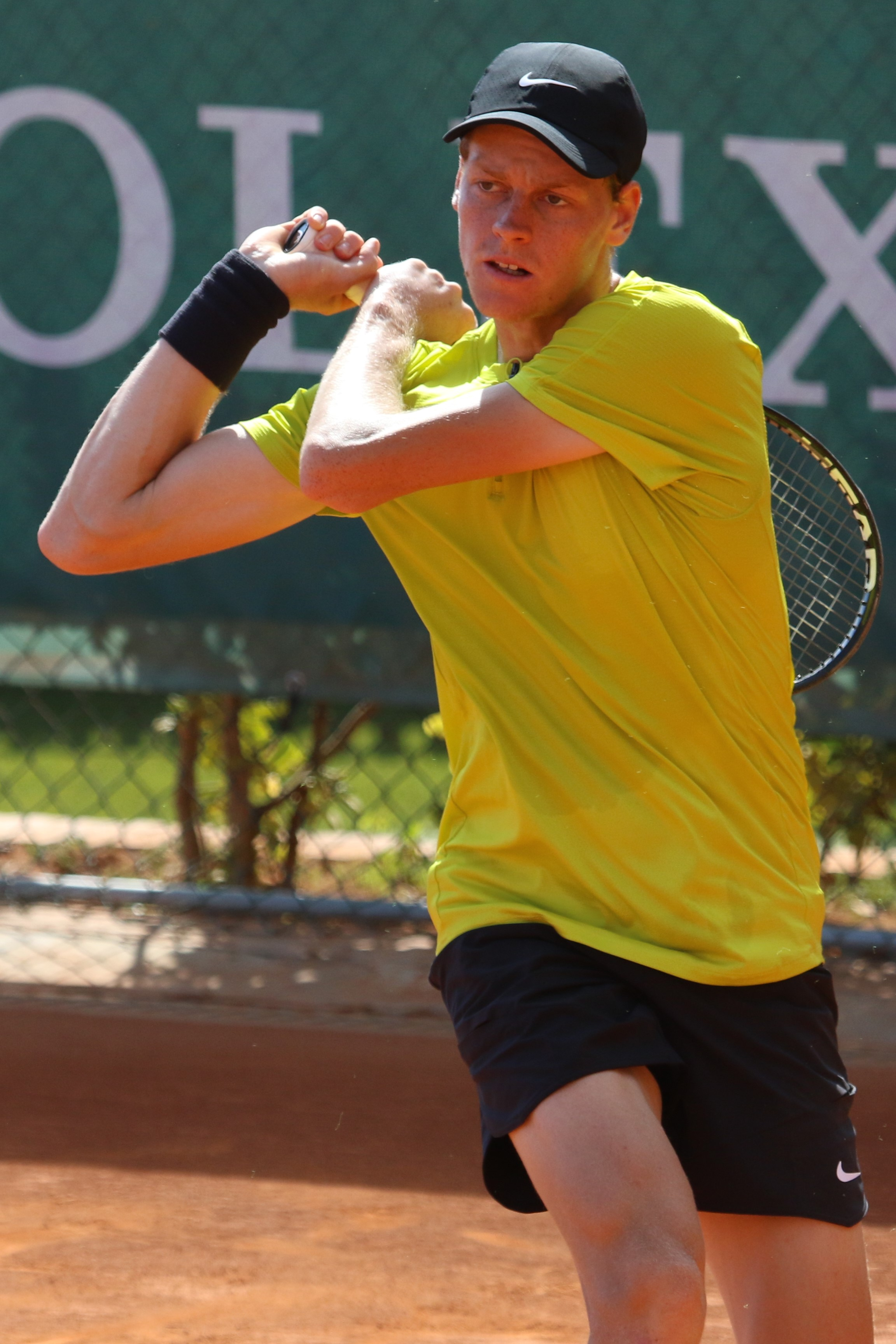
Sinner

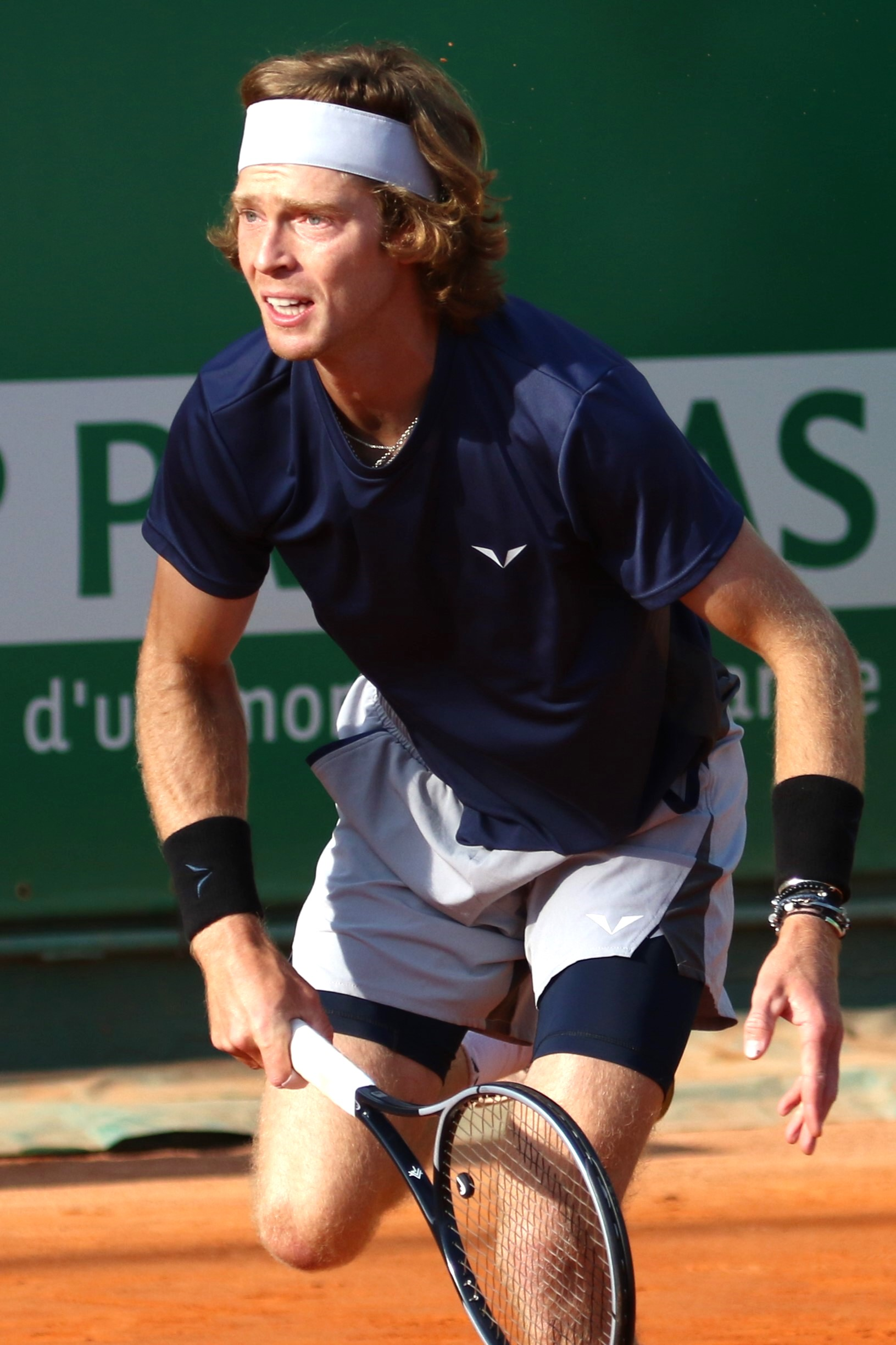
Rublev

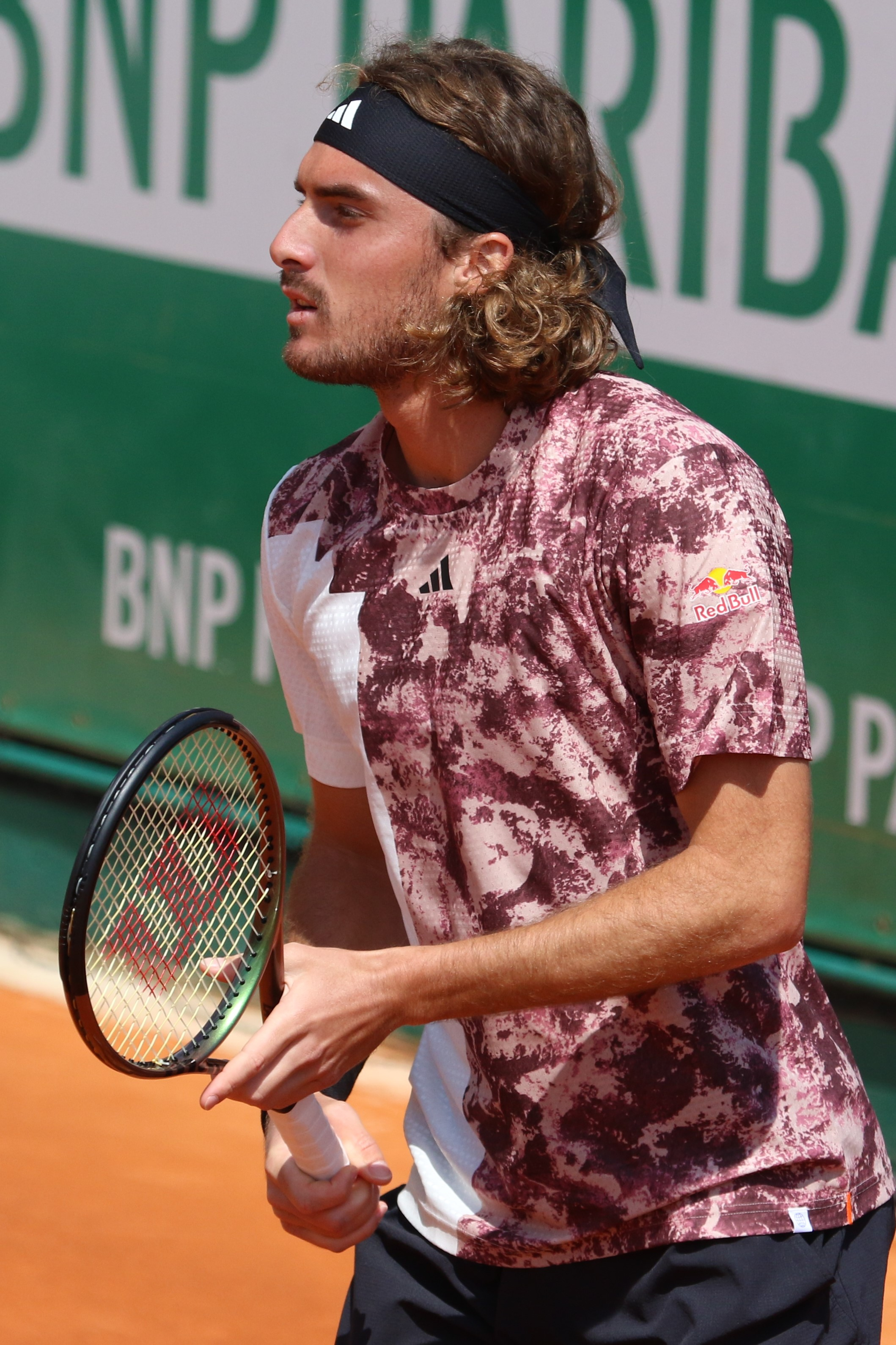
Tsitsipas

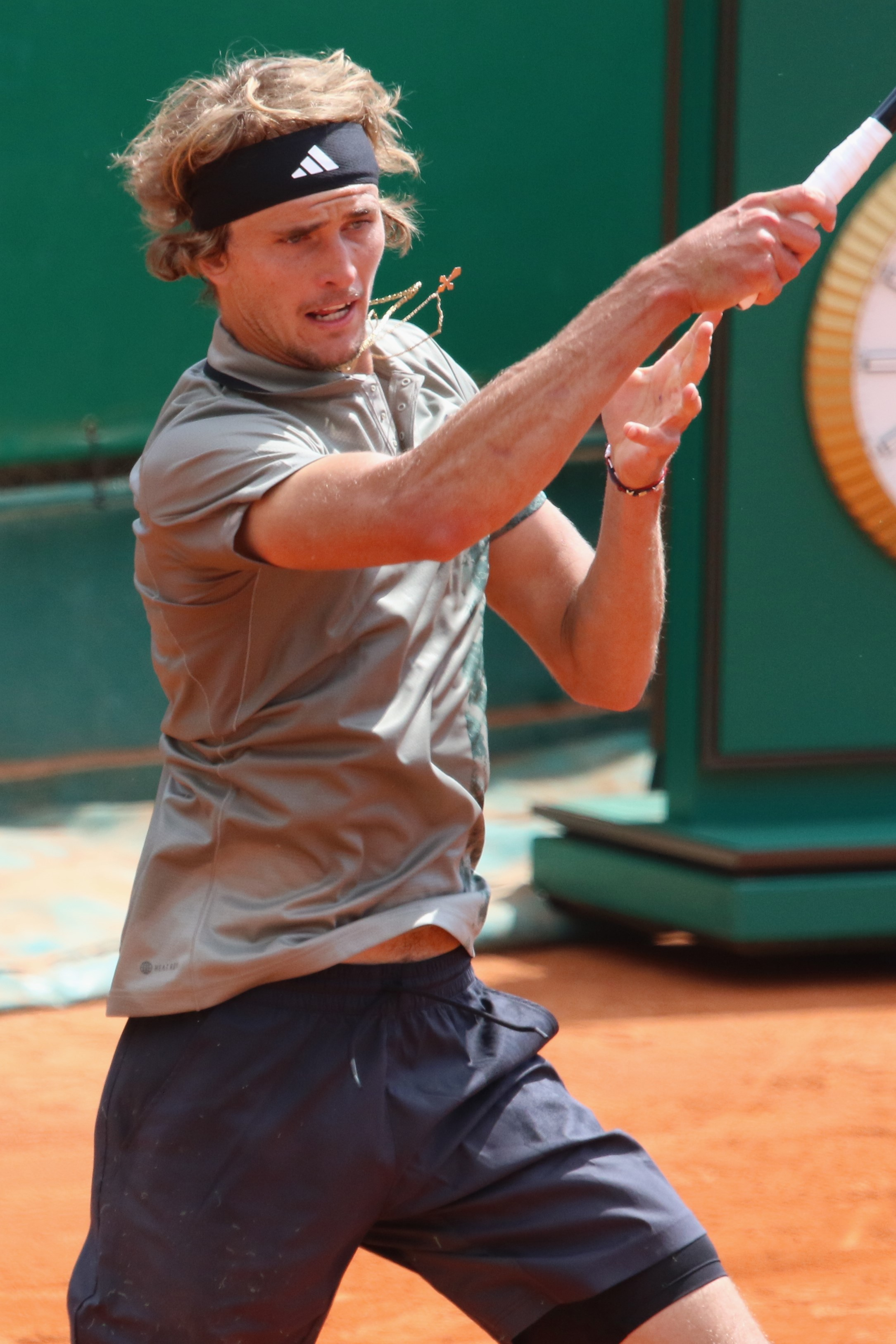
Zverev

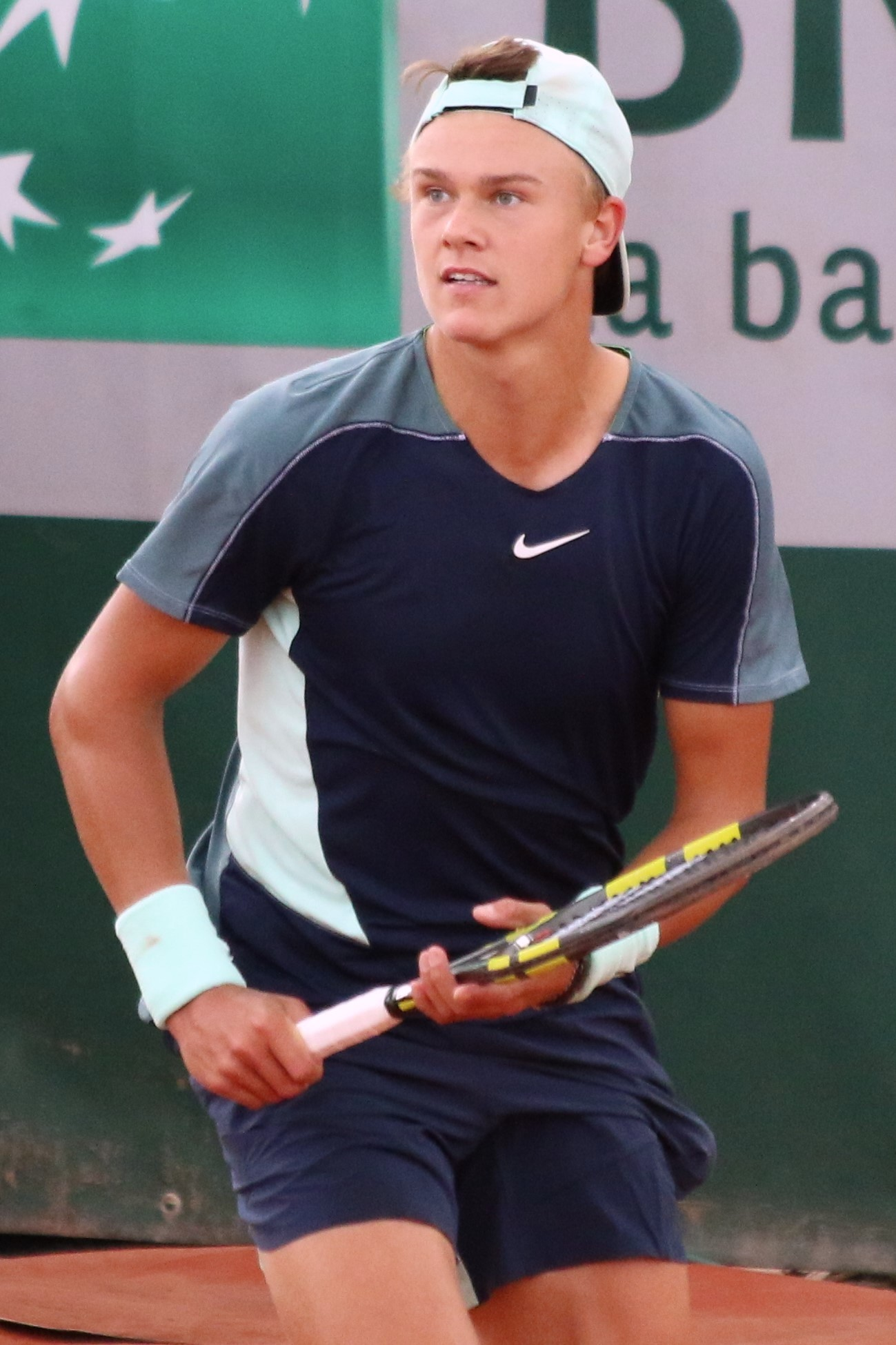
Rune

=== Doubles ===
| # | Players | Points | Date qualified |
|---|---|---|---|
| 1 | (Croatia) Ivan Dodig (United States) Austin Krajicek | 6,330 | 9 October |
| 2 | (Netherlands) Wesley Koolhof (United Kingdom) Neal Skupski | 6,060 | 9 October |
| 3 | (India) Rohan Bopanna (Australia) Matthew Ebden | 5,990 | 14 October |
| 4 | (Mexico) Santiago González (France) Édouard Roger-Vasselin | 5,610 | 2 November |
| 5 | (Spain) Marcel Granollers (Argentina) Horacio Zeballos | 5,127 | 30 October |
| 6 | (United States) Rajeev Ram (United Kingdom) Joe Salisbury | 4,822 | 29 October |
| 7 | (Argentina) Máximo González (Argentina) Andrés Molteni | 4,380 | 3 November |
| 8 | (Australia) Rinky Hijikata (Australia) Jason Kubler | 2,180 | 2 November |

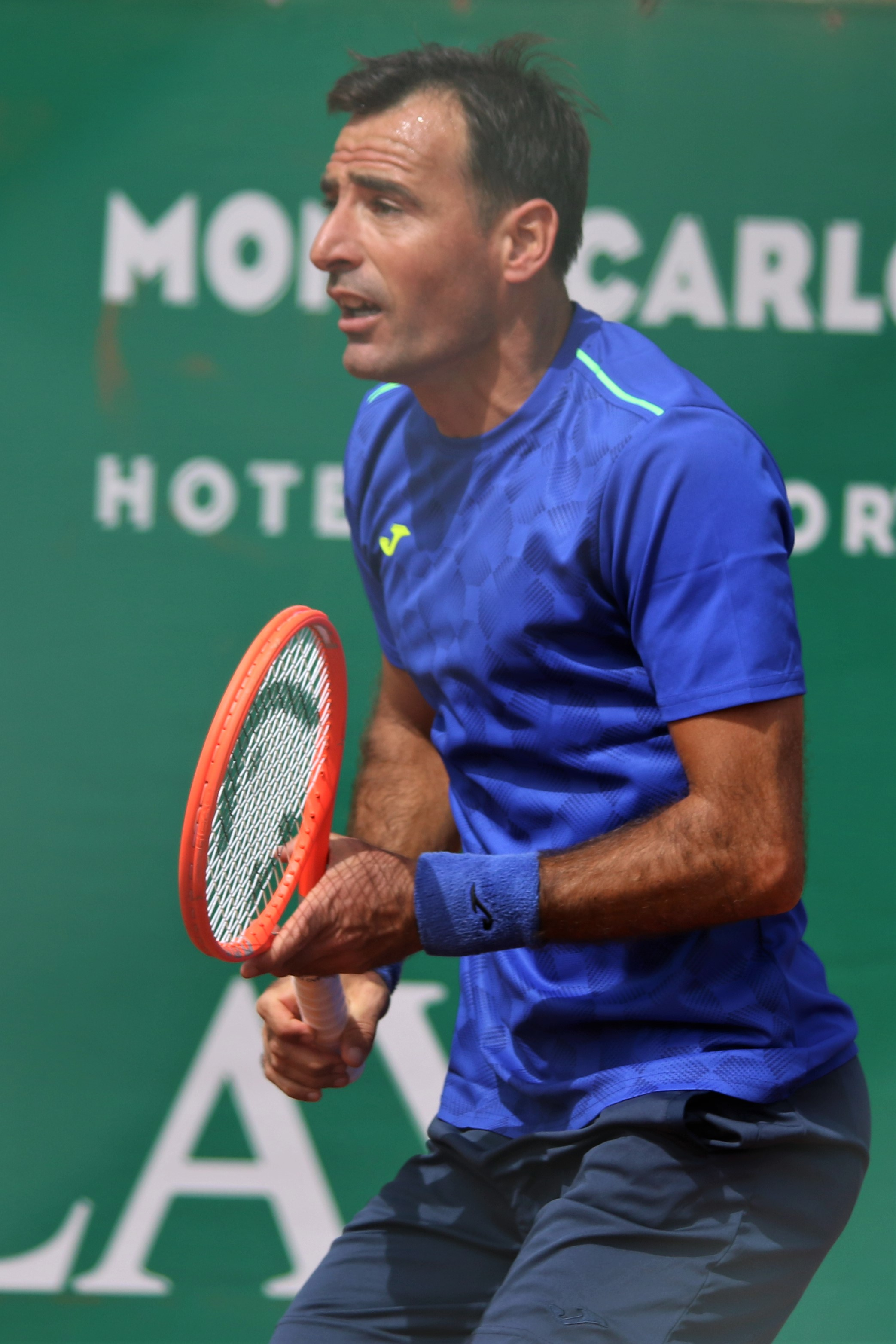
Dodig

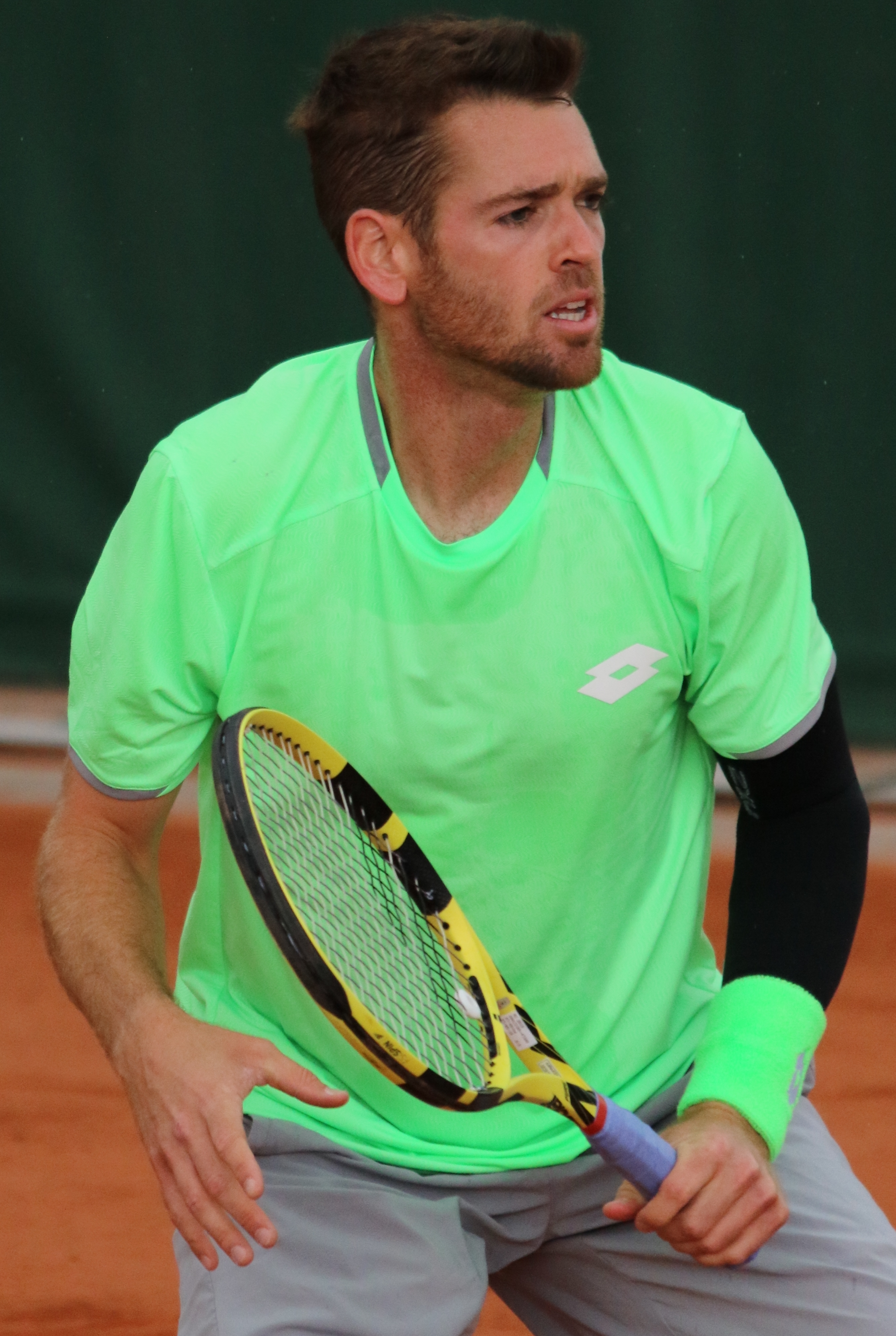
Krajicek

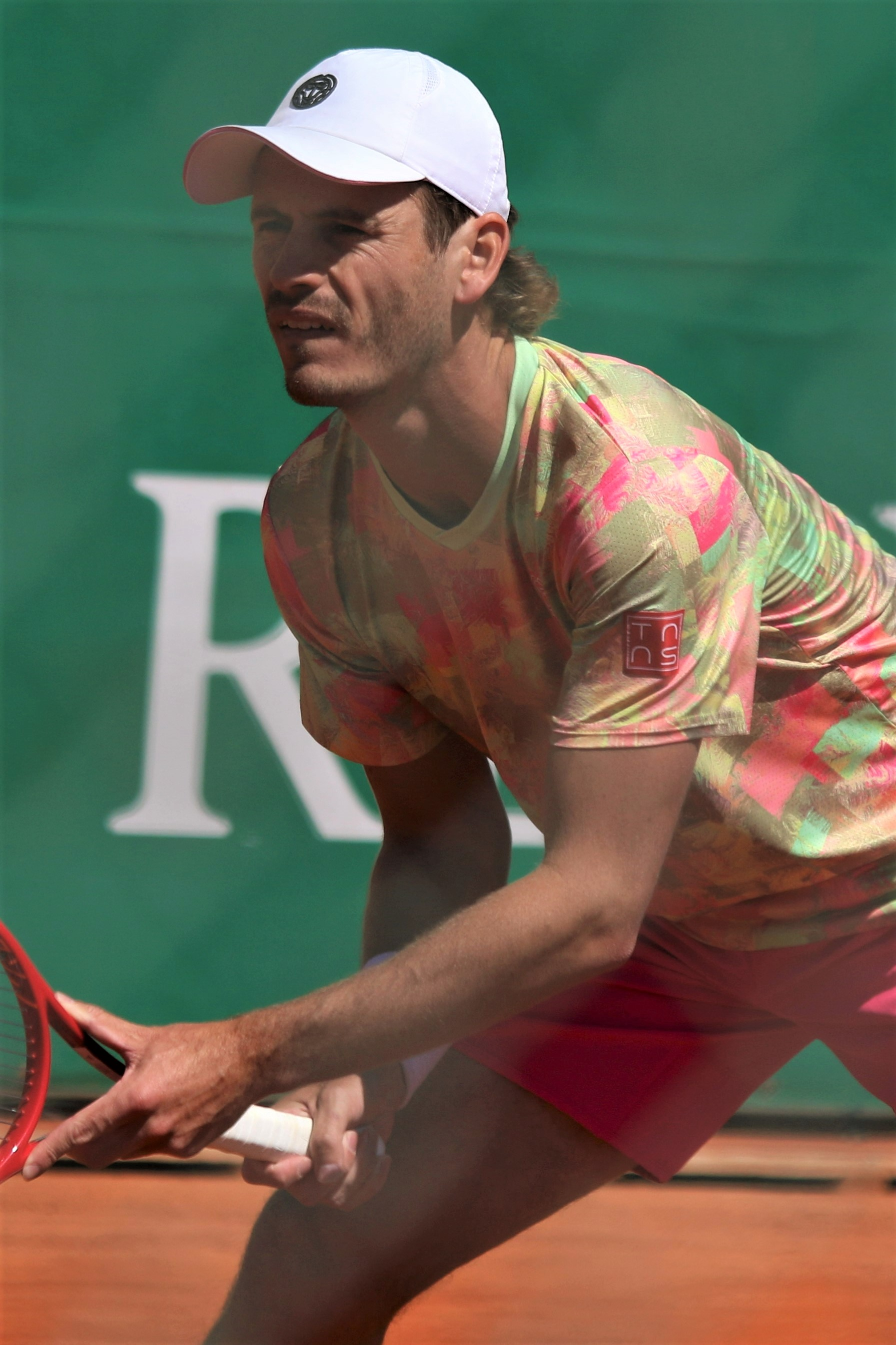
Koolhof

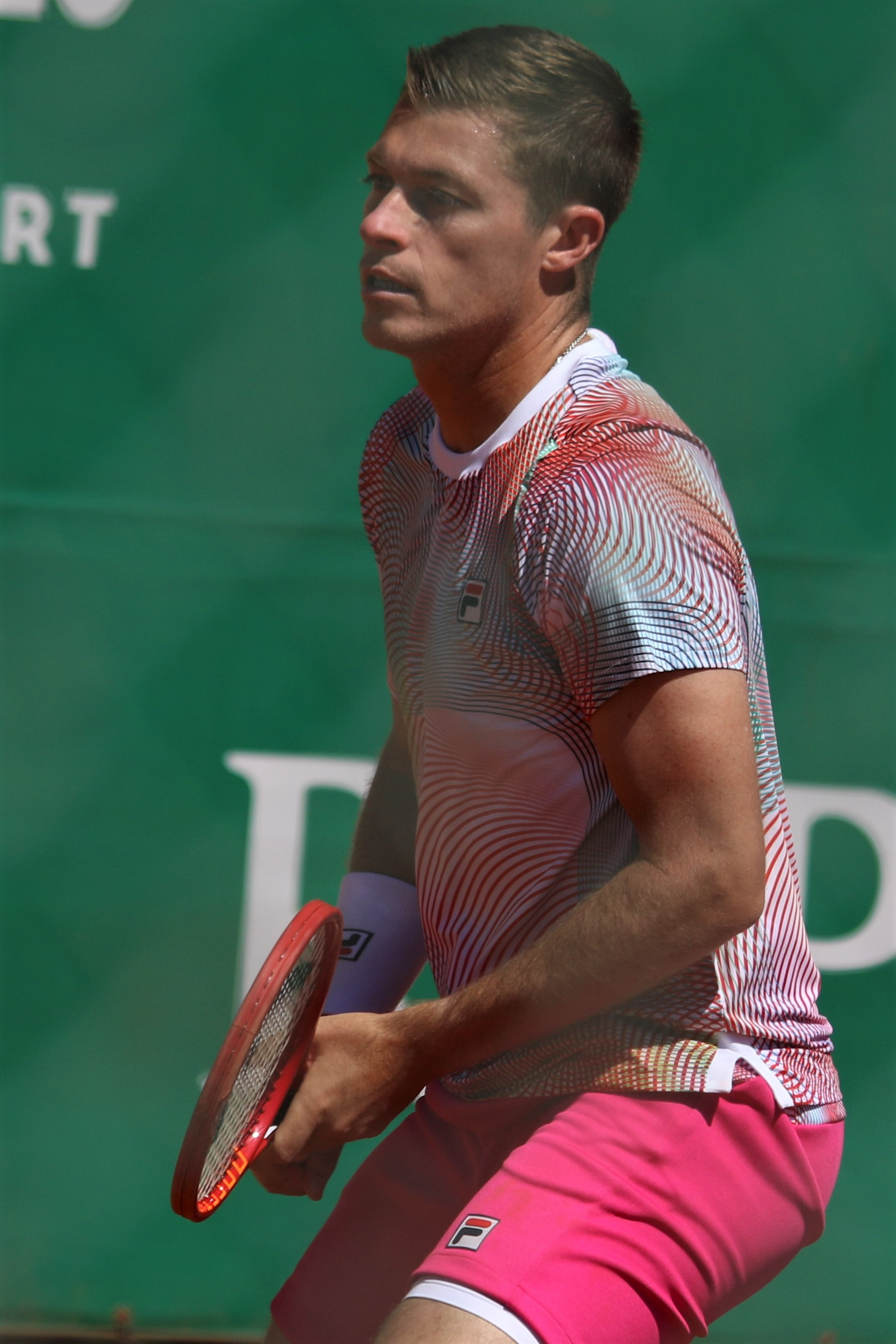
Skupski

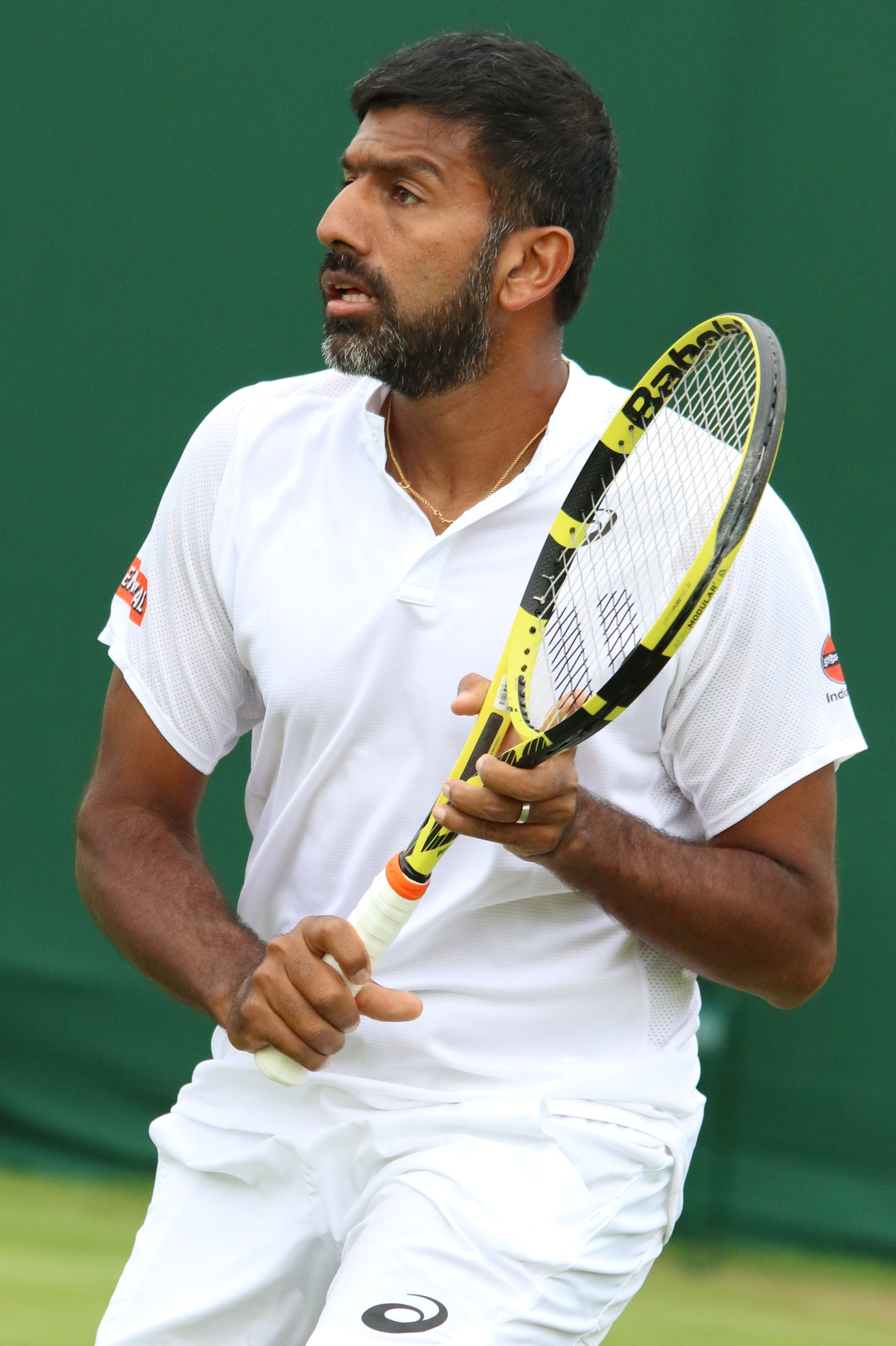
Bopanna

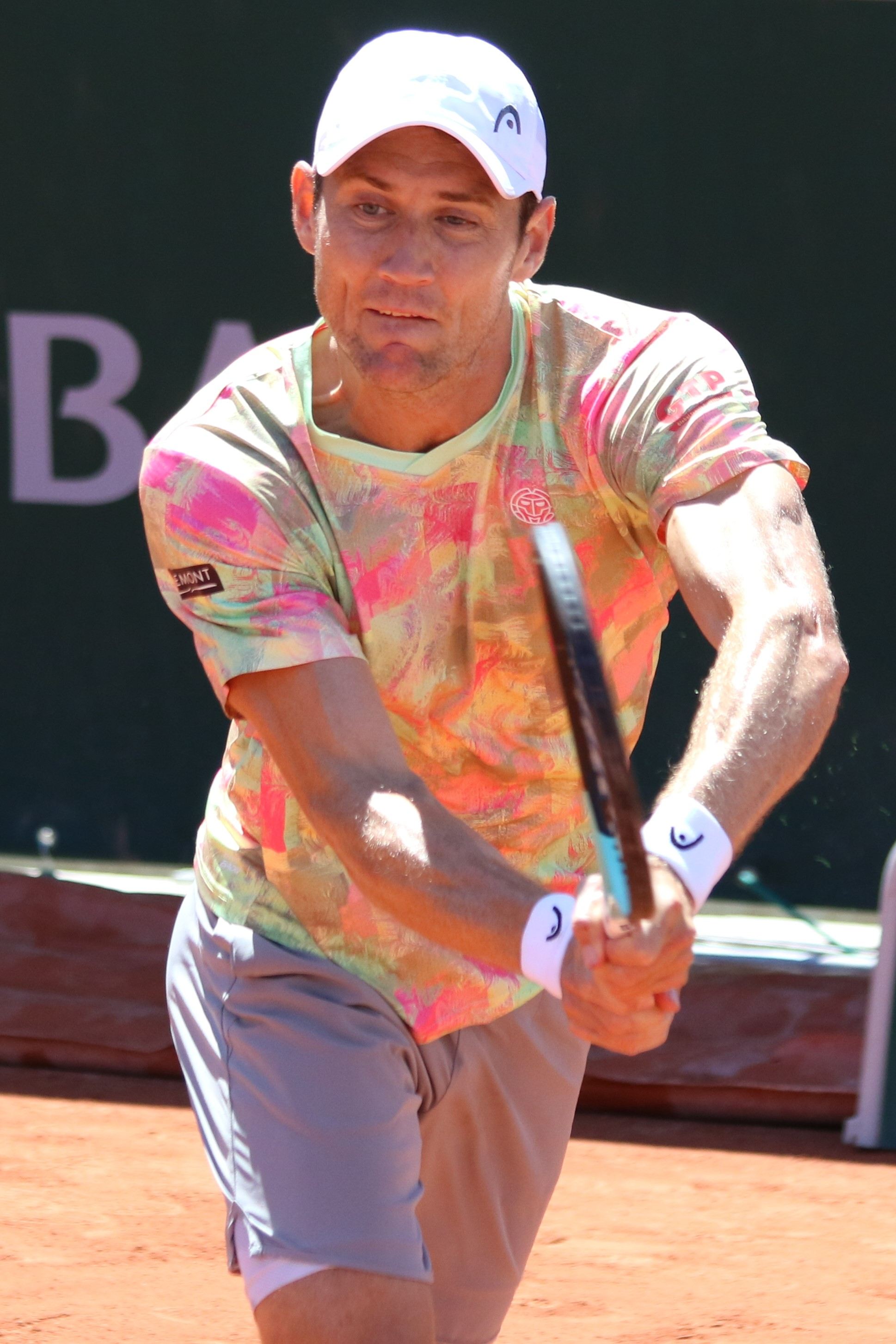
Ebden

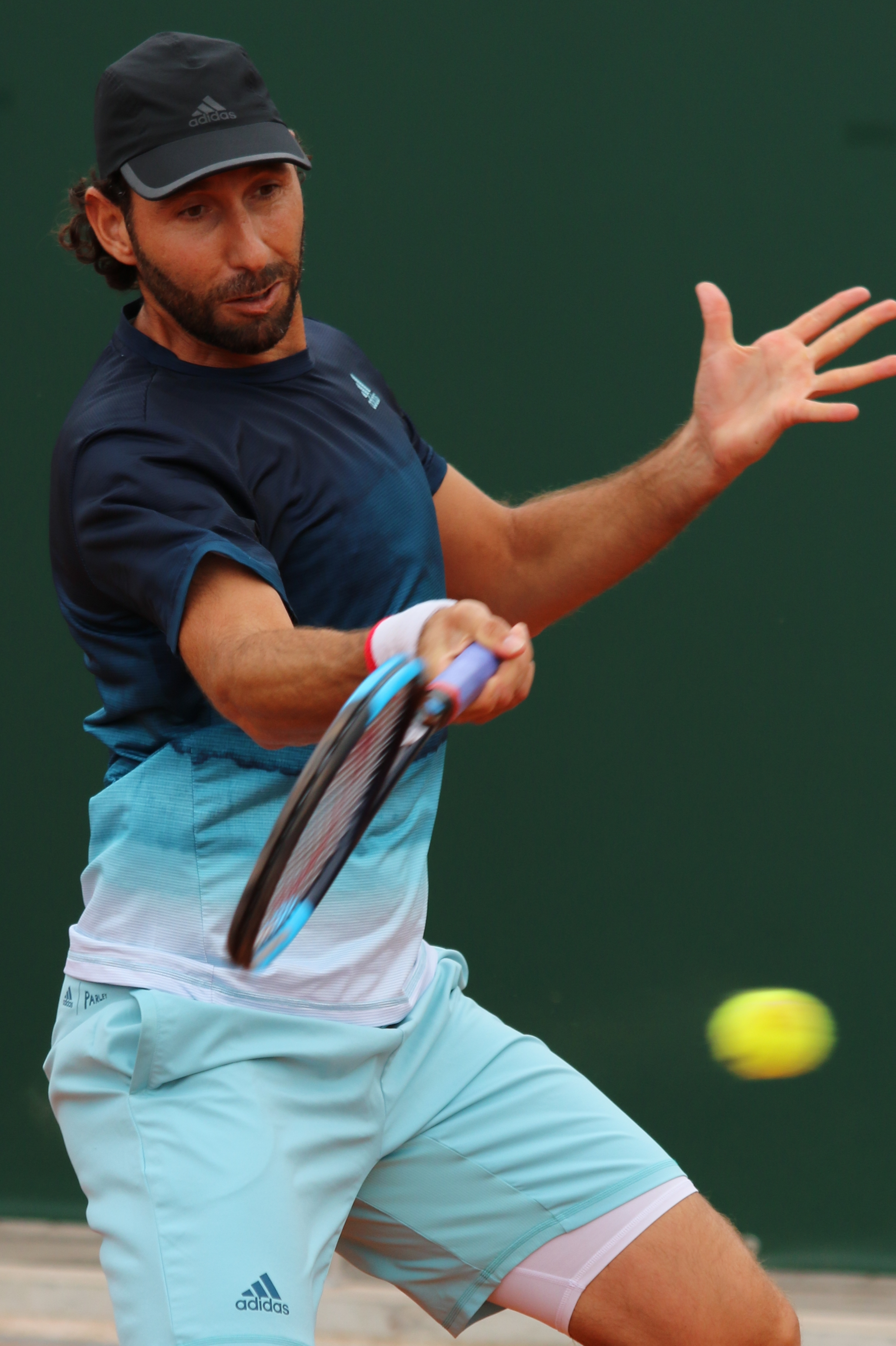
S González

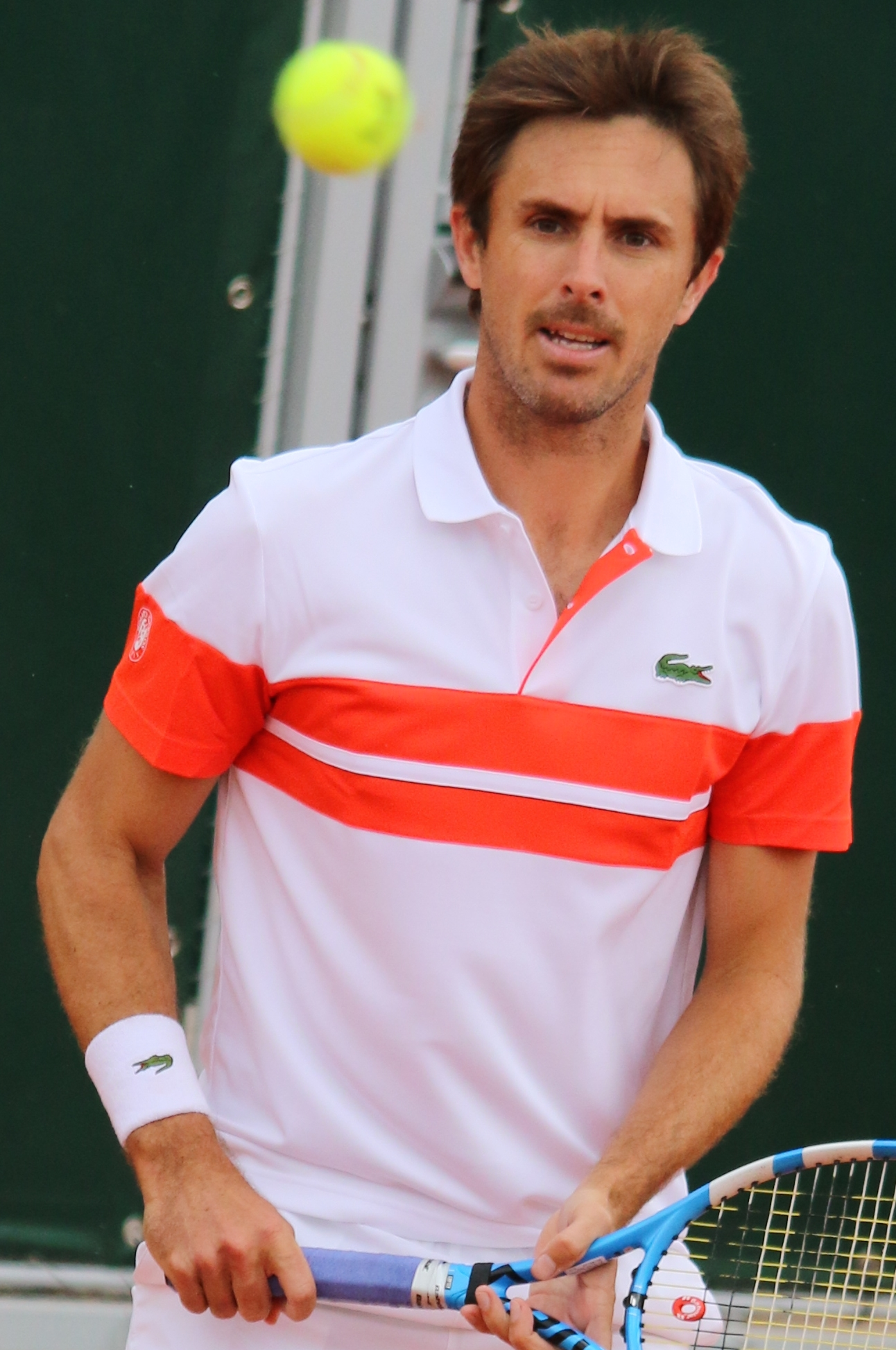
Roger-Vasselin

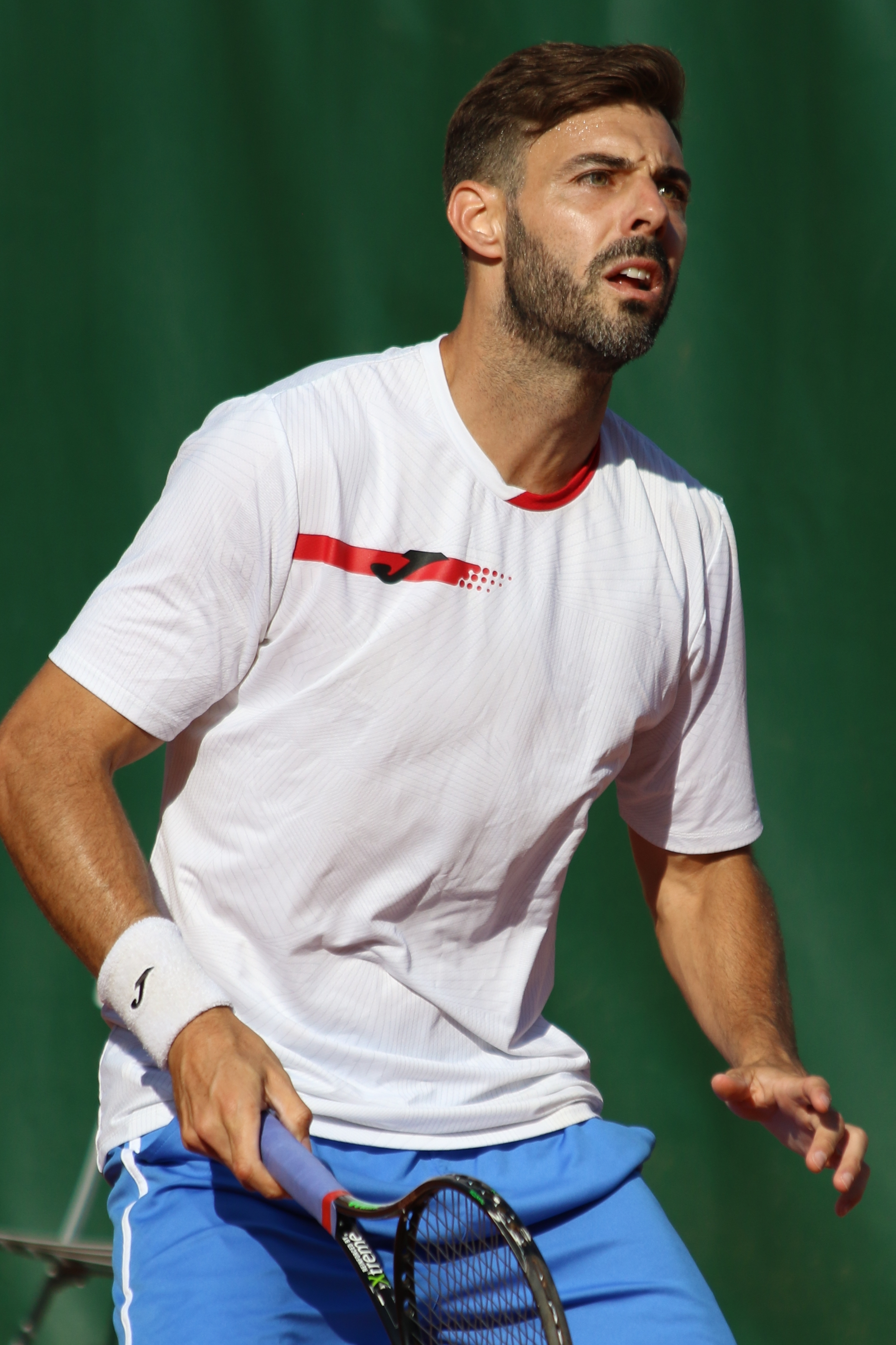
Granollers

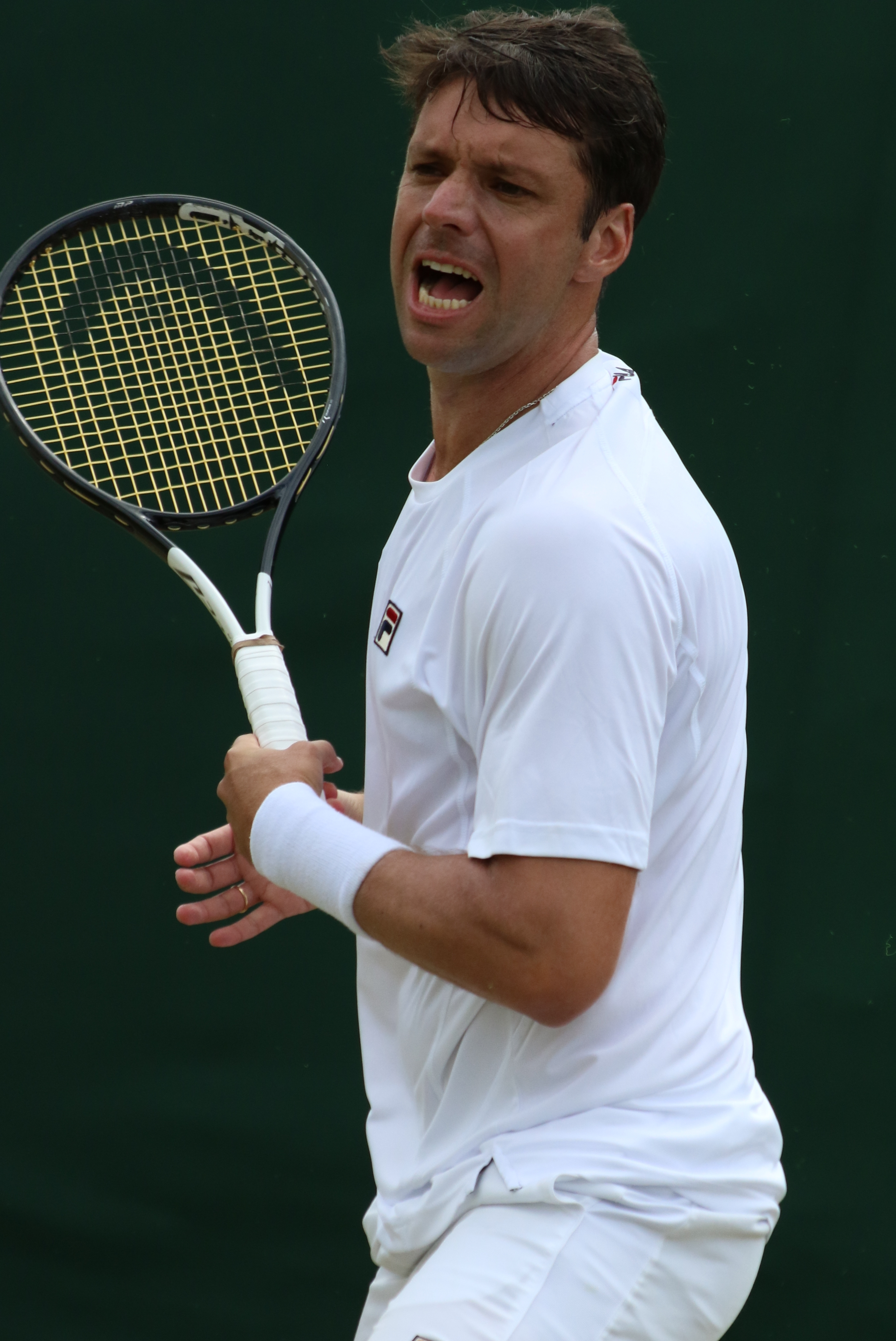
Zeballos

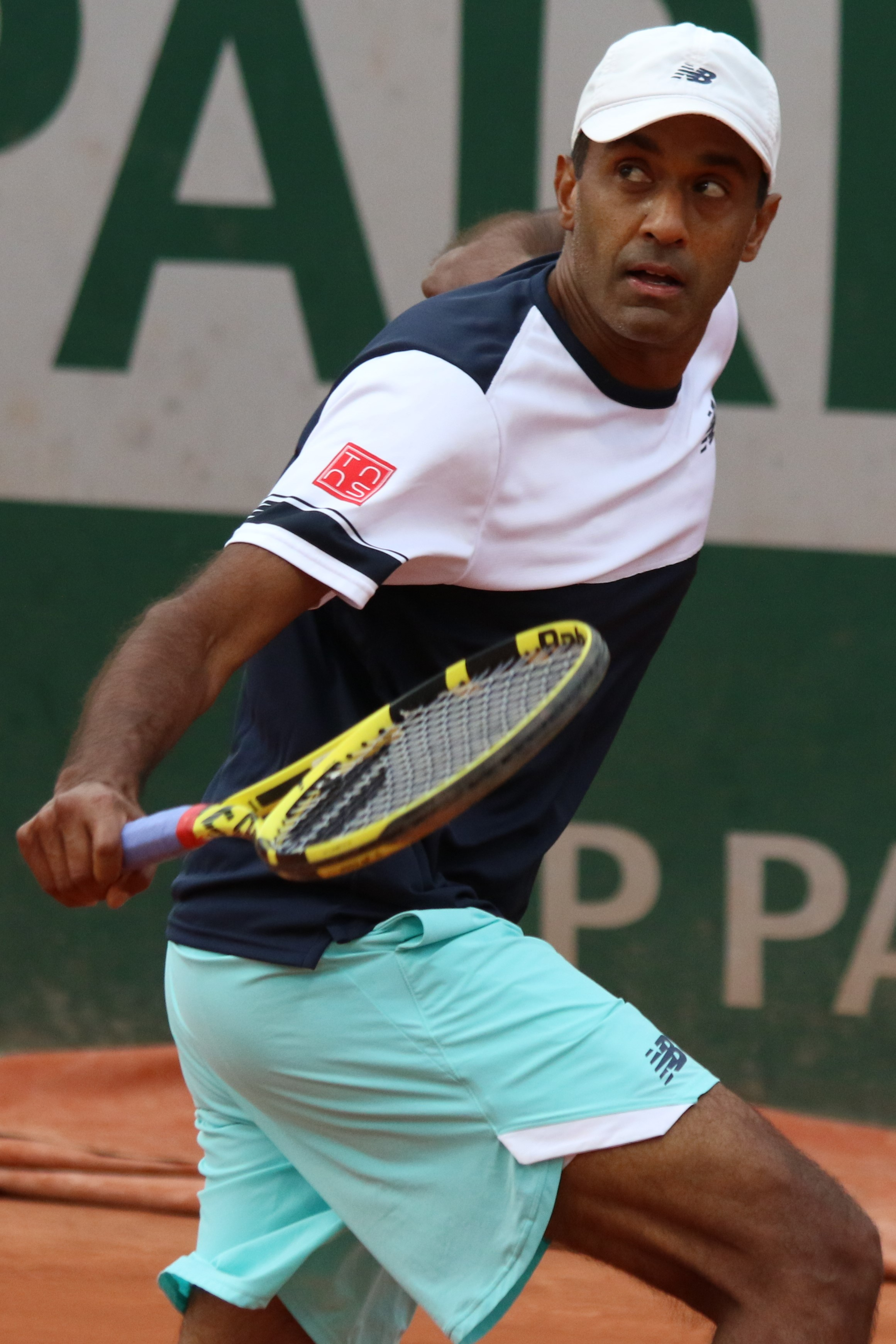
Ram

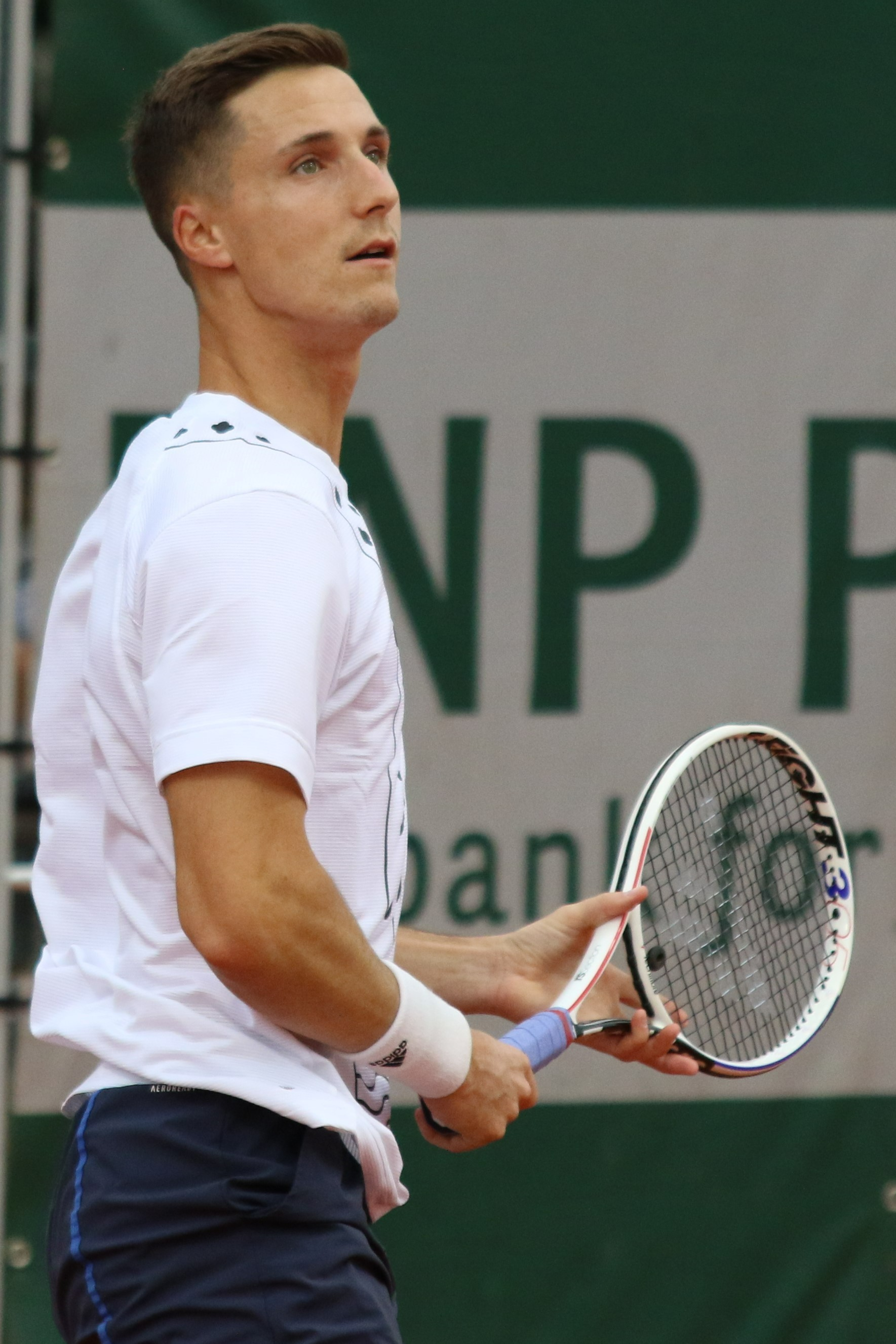
Salisbury

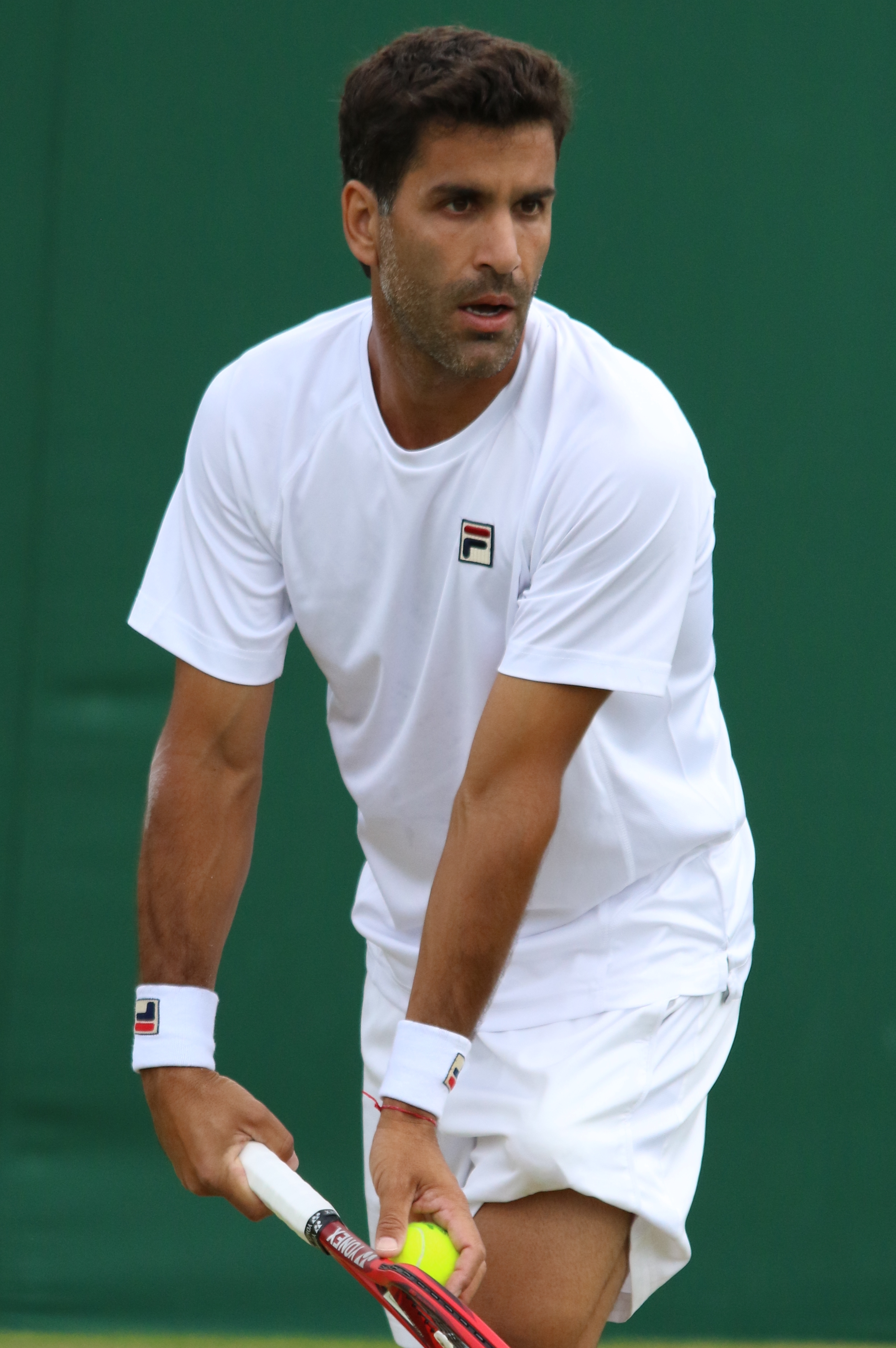
M González

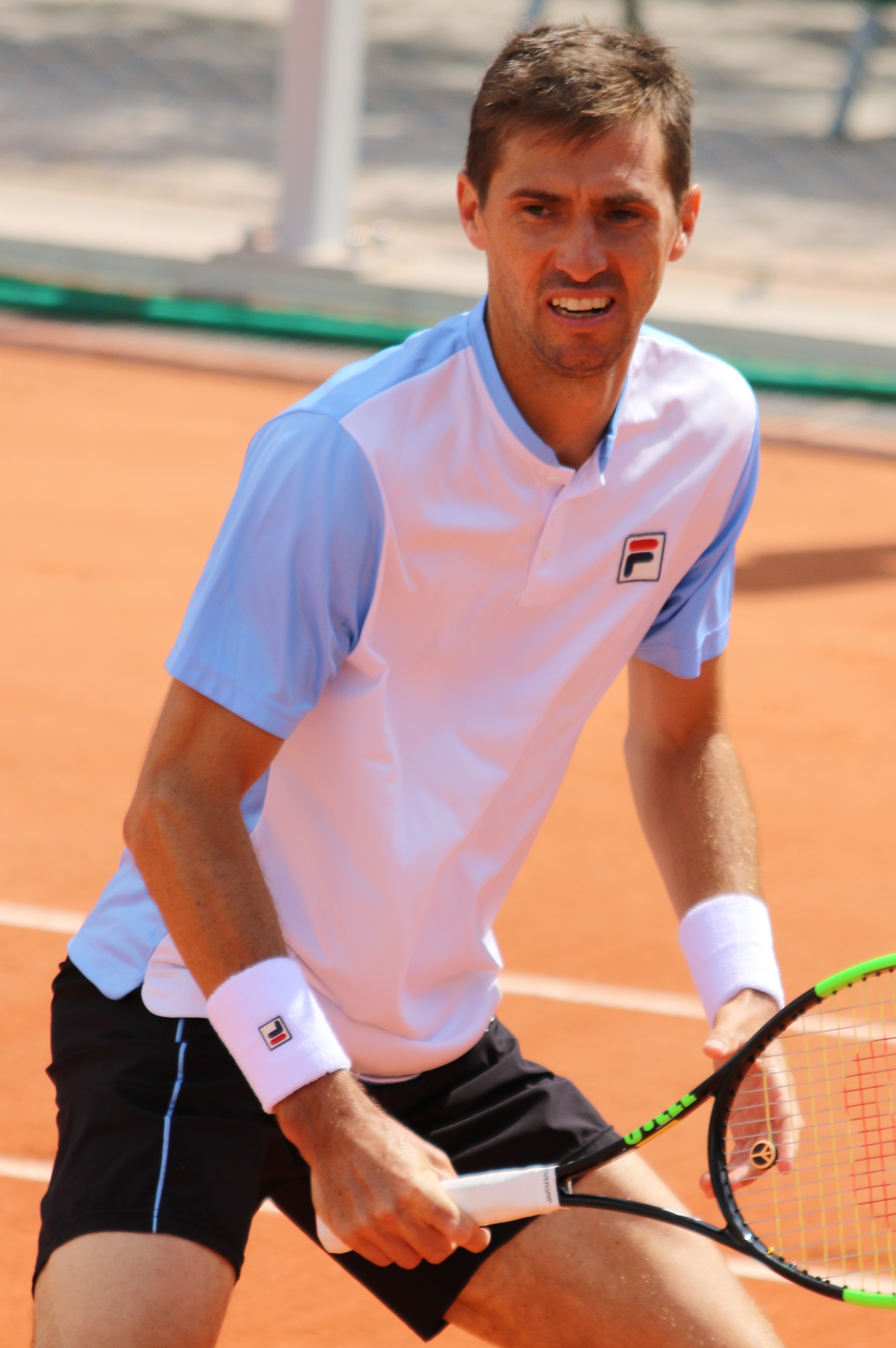
Molteni

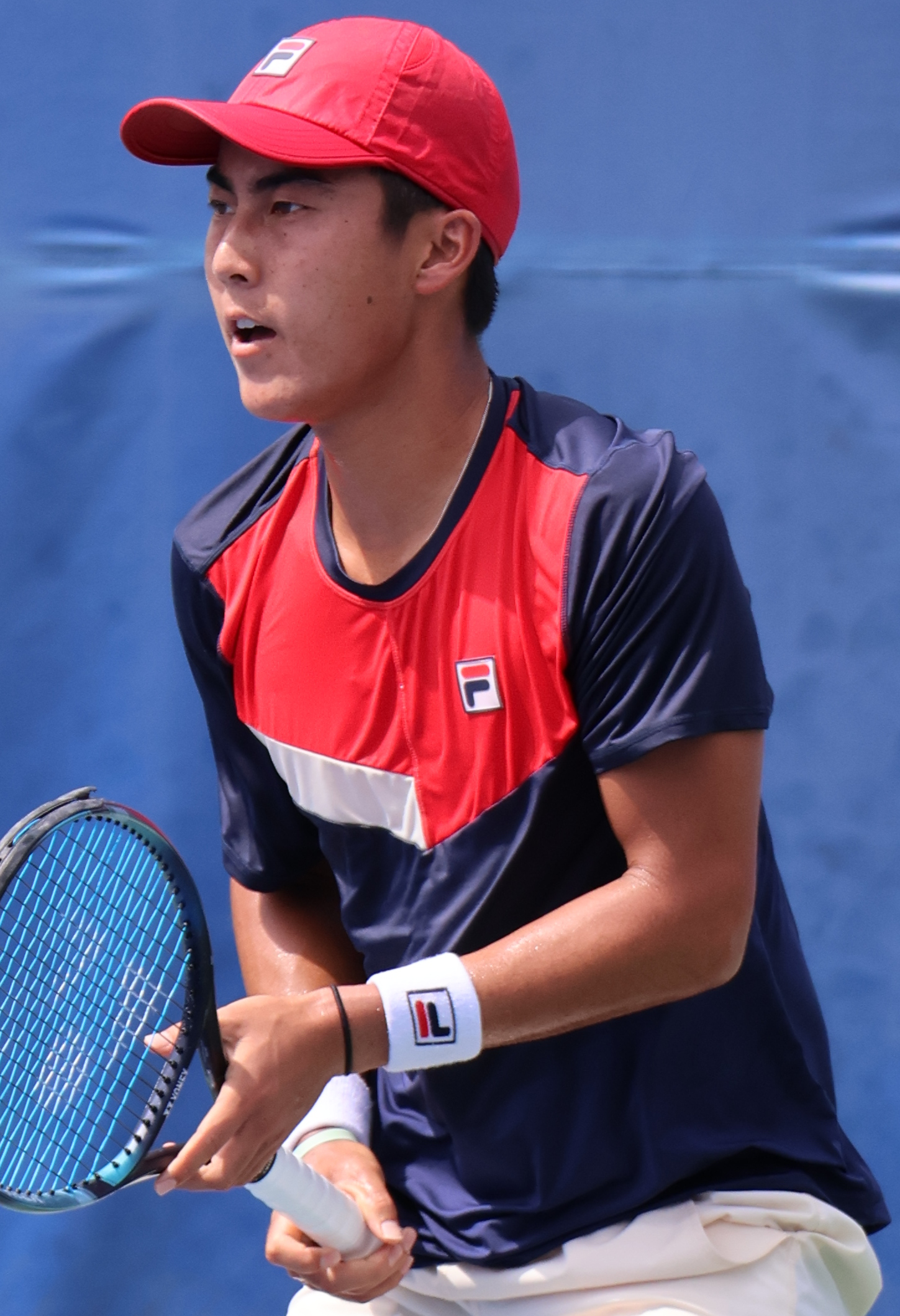
Hijikata

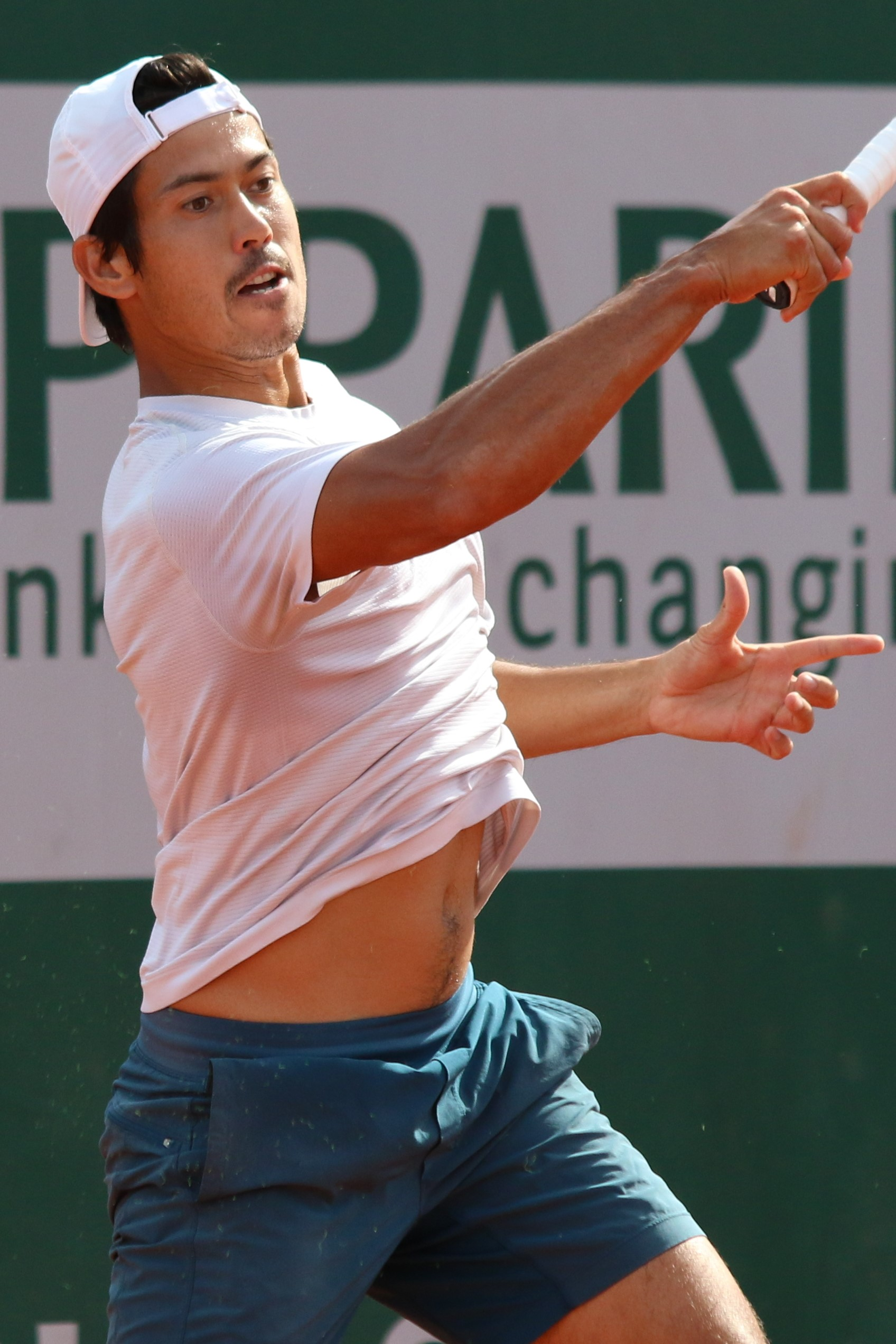
Kubler

== Points breakdown ==
=== Singles ===
† Player qualified for ATP Finals.

| Seed | Player | Grand Slam | | | | ATP Masters 1000 (Note: Player can replace points from up to 3 mandatory Masters 1000 plus Monte Carlo (not mandatory) with other next-best results from tournaments taking place after the replaced tournaments. Ranking points are shown in italics in these cases.) | | | | | | | | | Best other | | | | | | Total points | Tourn | Titles |
| Seed | Player | AUS | FRA | WIM | USO | IW | MI | MC | MA | IT | CA | CI | SH | PA | 1 | 2 | 3 | 4 | 5 | 6 | Total points | Tourn | Titles |
|---|---|---|---|---|---|---|---|---|---|---|---|---|---|---|---|---|---|---|---|---|---|---|---|
| 1^{†} | (Serbia) Novak Djokovic | W 2000 | W 2000 | F 1200 | W 2000 | A 0 | A 0 | R16; 90 | A 0 | QF; 180 | A 0 | W 1000 | A 0 | W 1000 | W 250 | SF; 180 | QF; 45 | | | | 9,945 | 11 | 6 |
| 2^{†} | (Spain) Carlos Alcaraz | A 0 | SF; 720 | W 2000 | SF; 720 | W 1000 | SF; 360 | A 0 | W 1000 | R32; 45 | QF; 180 | F 600 | R16; 90 | R32; 10 | W 500 | W 500 | F 300 | W 250 | SF; 180 | | 8,455 | 16 | 6 |
| 3^{†} | Daniil Medvedev | R32; 90 | R128; 10 | SF; 720 | F 1200 | F 600 | W 1000 | QF; 180 | R16; 90 | W 1000 | QF; 180 | R16; 90 | SF; 90 | R32; 10 | W 500 | W 500 | F 300 | F 300 | W 250 | QF; 90 | 7,200 | 21 | 5 |
| 4^{†} | (Italy) Jannik Sinner | R16; 180 | R64; 45 | SF; 720 | R16; 180 | SF; 360 | F 600 | SF; 360 | A 0 | R16; 90 | W 1000 | QF; 45 | R16; 90 | R16; 90 | W 500 | W 500 | F 300 | W 250 | QF; 90 | QF; 90 | 5,490 | 21 | 4 |
| 5^{†} | Andrey Rublev | QF; 360 | R32; 90 | QF; 360 | QF; 360 | R16; 90 | R16; 90 | W 1000 | R16; 90 | R16; 90 | R16; 45 | QF; 45 | F 600 | SF; 360 | F 300 | F 300 | W 250 | SF; 180 | F 150 | R16; 45 | 4,805 | 24 | 2 |
| 6^{†} | (Greece) Stefanos Tsitsipas | F 1200 | QF; 360 | R16; 180 | R64; 45 | R16; 45 | R16; 90 | QF; 180 | QF; 180 | SF; 360 | R32; 10 | R16; 90 | R32; 45 | SF; 360 | F 300 | W 250 | SF; 225 | SF; 180 | SF; 90 | R16; 45 | 4,235 | 23 | 1 |
| 7^{†} | (Germany) Alexander Zverev | R64; 45 | SF; 720 | R32; 90 | QF; 360 | R16; 90 | SF; 90 | R16; 90 | R16; 90 | R16; 90 | R32; 45 | SF; 360 | R16; 45 | R16; 90 | W 500 | W 250 | SF; 180 | SF; 180 | SF; 180 | QF; 90 | 3,585 | 26 | 2 |
| 8^{†} | (Denmark) Holger Rune | R16; 180 | QF; 360 | QF; 360 | R128; 10 | R32; 45 | R16; 90 | F 600 | R32; 45 | F 600 | R16; 45 | R32; 10 | R64; 10 | QF; 180 | W 250 | SF; 180 | SF; 180 | SF; 180 | SF; 90 | R16; 45 | 3,460 | 22 | 1 |
Alternates
| 9 | (Poland) Hubert Hurkacz | R16; 180 | R32; 90 | R16; 180 | R64; 45 | R32; 45 | R32; 45 | R16; 90 | R32; 45 | R16; 45 | R16; 90 | SF; 360 | W 1000 | QF; 180 | F 300 | W 250 | QF; 90 | SF; 90 | SF; 75 | R16; 45 | 3,245 | 23 | 2 |
| 10 | (United States) Taylor Fritz | R64; 45 | R32; 90 | R64; 45 | QF; 360 | QF; 180 | QF; 180 | SF; 360 | R16; 90 | SF; 90 | R16; 90 | QF; 180 | R32; 45 | R32; 45 | W 350 | W 250 | W 250 | SF; 180 | SF; 180 | SF; 90 | 3,100 | 26 | 3 |

=== Doubles ===
† Team qualified for ATP Finals.

| Seed | Team | Points | | | | | | | | | | | | | | | | | | | Total points | Tourn | Titles |
| Seed | Team | 1 | 2 | 3 | 4 | 5 | 6 | 7 | 8 | 9 | 10 | 11 | 12 | 13 | 14 | 15 | 16 | 17 | 18 | 19 | Total points | Tourn | Titles |
|---|---|---|---|---|---|---|---|---|---|---|---|---|---|---|---|---|---|---|---|---|---|---|---|
| 1^{†} | (Croatia) Ivan Dodig (United States) Austin Krajicek | W 2000 | W 1000 | SF; 720 | W 500 | W 500 | W 500 | SF; 360 | QF; 180 | F 150 | F 150 | R32; 90 | R16; 90 | QF; 90 | R64; 0 | R32; 0 | R16; 0 | R32; 0 | R16; 0 | R16; 0 | 6,330 | 19 | 5 |
| 2^{†} | (Netherlands) Wesley Koolhof (United Kingdom) Neal Skupski | W 2000 | F 600 | QF; 360 | QF; 360 | SF; 360 | F 300 | F 300 | W 250 | R16; 180 | QF; 180 | QF; 180 | QF; 180 | QF; 180 | QF; 180 | SF; 180 | SF; 180 | SF; 90 | R16; 0 | R16; 0 | 6,060 | 22 | 2 |
| 3^{†} | (India) Rohan Bopanna (Australia) Matthew Ebden | F 1200 | W 1000 | SF; 720 | F 600 | F 600 | F 600 | F 300 | W 250 | QF; 180 | SF; 180 | R16; 90 | R16; 90 | QF; 90 | SF; 90 | R64; 0 | R64; 0 | R16; 0 | R32; 0 | R16; 0 | 5,990 | 20 | 2 |
| 4^{†} | (Mexico) Santiago González (France) Édouard Roger-Vasselin | W 1000 | W 1000 | W 500 | SF; 360 | SF; 360 | SF; 360 | W 250 | W 250 | R16; 180 | R16; 180 | R16; 180 | QF; 180 | SF; 180 | SF; 180 | R32; 90 | R16; 90 | QF; 90 | QF; 90 | SF; 90 | 5,610 | 26 | 5 |
| 5^{†} | (Spain) Marcel Granollers (Argentina) Horacio Zeballos | F 1200 | W 1000 | SF; 720 | SF; 720 | SF; 360 | SF; 360 | R16; 180 | QF; 180 | F 150 | QF; 90 | SF; 90 | QF; 45 | QF; 32 | R32; 0 | R32; 0 | R32; 0 | R32; 0 | R32; 0 | R16; 0 | 5,127 | 20 | 1 |
| 6^{†} | (United States) Rajeev Ram (United Kingdom) Joe Salisbury | W 2000 | F 600 | W 500 | SF; 360 | W 250 | R16; 180 | R16; 180 | QF; 180 | R16; 90 | R16; 90 | QF; 90 | QF; 90 | SF; 90 | SF; 90 | QF; 32 | R64; 0 | R16; 0 | R32; 0 | R16; 0 | 4,822 | 22 | 3 |
| 7^{†} | (Argentina) Máximo González (Argentina) Andrés Molteni | W 1000 | W 545 | W 500 | W 500 | QF; 360 | QF; 360 | W 250 | QF; 180 | QF; 180 | F 100 | R32; 90 | R16; 90 | SF; 90 | QF; 45 | QF; 45 | QF; 45 | R64; 0 | R16; 0 | R32; 0 | 4,380 | 25 | 5 |
| 8^{†} | (Australia) Rinky Hijikata (Australia) Jason Kubler (Note: Hijikata/Kubler qualified as one of this year's Grand Slam doubles champions ranked in the top 20 on 13 November 2023.) | W 2000 | R32; 90 | QF; 45 | QF; 45 | R64; 0 | R32; 0 | R32; 0 | R32; 0 | | | | | | | | | | | | 2,180 | 8 | 1 |
Alternates
| 9 | (United States) Nathaniel Lammons (United States) Jackson Withrow | QF; 360 | QF; 360 | SF; 360 | F 300 | F 300 | W 250 | W 250 | W 250 | W 250 | QF; 180 | SF; 180 | W 175 | F 150 | F 150 | F 150 | R16; 90 | R16; 90 | QF; 90 | QF; 90 | 4,025 | 33 | 5 |
| 10 | (Monaco) Hugo Nys (Poland) Jan Zieliński | F 1200 | W 1000 | QF; 360 | F 300 | W 250 | R16; 180 | F 100 | R32; 90 | R16; 90 | QF; 90 | SF; 90 | QF; 45 | QF; 45 | QF; 45 | QF; 32 | R16; 20 | R32; 0 | R32; 0 | R32; 0 | 3,937 | 28 | 2 |

== Head-to-head records ==
Below are the head-to-head records as they approached the tournament.

=== Singles ===
| | | Djokovic | Alcaraz | Medvedev | Sinner | Rublev | Tsitsipas | Zverev | Rune | Overall | YTD W–L |
| 1 | (Serbia) Novak Djokovic | | 2–2 | 10–5 | 3–0 | 5–1 | 11–2 | 8–4 | 2–2 | 41–16 | 51–5 |
| 2 | (Spain) Carlos Alcaraz | 2–2 | | 2–2 | 3–4 | 0–0 | 5–0 | 3–3 | 2–1 | 17–12 | 63–10 |
| 3 | Daniil Medvedev | 5–10 | 2–2 | | 6–2 | 6–2 | 9–4 | 10–7 | 1–1 | 39–28 | 64–16 |
| 4 | (Italy) Jannik Sinner | 0–3 | 4–3 | 2–6 | | 4–2 | 2–5 | 1–4 | 0–2 | 13–25 | 57–14 |
| 5 | Andrey Rublev | 1–5 | 0–0 | 2–6 | 2–4 | | 5–6 | 3–5 | 2–1 | 15–27 | 56–23 |
| 6 | (Greece) Stefanos Tsitsipas | 2–11 | 0–5 | 4–9 | 5–2 | 6–5 | | 9–4 | 0–2 | 26–38 | 51–22 |
| 7 | (Germany) Alexander Zverev | 4–8 | 3–3 | 7–10 | 4–1 | 5–3 | 4–9 | | 0–1 | 27–35 | 53–26 |
| 8 | (Denmark) Holger Rune | 2–2 | 1–2 | 1–1 | 2–0 | 1–2 | 2–0 | 1–0 | | 10–7 | 43–22 |

=== Doubles ===
| | | Dodig; Krajicek | Koolhof; Skupski | Bopanna; Ebden | S González; Roger-Vas. | Granollers; Zeballos | Ram; Salisbury | M González; Molteni | Hijikata; Kubler | Overall | YTD W–L |
| 1 | (Croatia) Ivan Dodig (United States) Austin Krajicek | | 2–2 | 1–0 | 2–0 | 2–1 | 2–2 | 0–1 | 0–0 | 9–6 | 38–13 |
| 2 | (Netherlands) Wesley Koolhof (United Kingdom) Neal Skupski | 2–2 | | 3–2 | 2–3 | 1–2 | 1–3 | 0–1 | 2–1 | 11–14 | 44–20 |
| 3 | (India) Rohan Bopanna (Australia) Matthew Ebden | 0–1 | 2–3 | | 2–1 | 1–2 | 0–1 | 0–0 | 0–0 | 5–8 | 38–18 |
| 4 | (Mexico) Santiago González (France) Édouard Roger-Vasselin | 0–2 | 3–2 | 1–2 | | 2–0 | 2–1 | 0–0 | 0–0 | 8–7 | 51–21 |
| 5 | (Spain) Marcel Granollers (Argentina) Horacio Zeballos | 1–2 | 2–1 | 2–1 | 0–2 | | 3–5 | 2–1 | 0–1 | 10–13 | 34–17 |
| 6 | (United States) Rajeev Ram (United Kingdom) Joe Salisbury | 2–2 | 3–1 | 1–0 | 1–2 | 5–3 | | 0–0 | 0–0 | 12–8 | 32–18 |
| 7 | (Argentina) Máximo González (Argentina) Andrés Molteni | 1–0 | 1–0 | 0–0 | 0–0 | 1–2 | 0–0 | | 0–0 | 3–2 | 38–20 |
| 8 | (Australia) Rinky Hijikata (Australia) Jason Kubler | 0–0 | 1–2 | 0–0 | 0–0 | 1–0 | 0–0 | 0–0 | | 2–2 | 9–6 |

== See also ==
- ATP rankings
- 2023 ATP Tour
- 2023 WTA Finals
- ATP Finals appearances
