= 2023 ATP Finals – Doubles =

2023 tennis tournament

Doubles
- 2023 ATP Finals

Final
- Champions: (United States) Rajeev Ram (United Kingdom) Joe Salisbury
- Runners-up: (Spain) Marcel Granollers (Argentina) Horacio Zeballos
- Score: 6–3, 6–4

Details
- Draw: 8 (round robin)

Events
| Singles | Doubles |
- ATP Finals

Defending champions Rajeev Ram and Joe Salisbury defeated Marcel Granollers and Horacio Zeballos in the final, 6–3, 6–4 to win the doubles tennis title at the 2023 ATP Finals.

Austin Krajicek claimed the individual year-end No. 1 doubles ranking after Rohan Bopanna lost in the semifinals. Wesley Koolhof was also in contention for the top spot at the start of the tournament. Ivan Dodig and Krajicek claimed the team year-end No. 1 doubles ranking after Granollers and Zeballos lost in the final. The top five seeds all had a chance to end the year as the top team.

== Seeds ==
1. (Croatia) Ivan Dodig / (United States) Austin Krajicek (round robin)
2. (Netherlands) Wesley Koolhof / (United Kingdom) Neal Skupski (round robin)
3. (India) Rohan Bopanna / (Australia) Matthew Ebden (semifinals)
4. (Mexico) Santiago González / (France) Édouard Roger-Vasselin (semifinals)
5. (Spain) Marcel Granollers / (Argentina) Horacio Zeballos (final)
6. (United States) Rajeev Ram / (United Kingdom) Joe Salisbury (champions)
7. (Argentina) Máximo González / (Argentina) Andrés Molteni (round robin)
8. (Australia) Rinky Hijikata / (Australia) Jason Kubler (round robin)

== Alternates ==
1. (United States) Nathaniel Lammons / (United States) Jackson Withrow (did not play)
2. (Monaco) Hugo Nys / (Poland) Jan Zieliński (did not play)

== Draw ==
=== Finals ===
Semifinals
5 | (Spain) Marcel Granollers (Argentina) Horacio Zeballos | 7 | 6
3 | (India) Rohan Bopanna (Australia) Matthew Ebden | 5 | 4
6 | (United States) Rajeev Ram (United Kingdom) Joe Salisbury | 7^{7} | 3 | [10]
4 | (Mexico) Santiago González (France) Édouard Roger-Vasselin | 6^{5} | 6 | [7]

Final
5 | (Spain) Marcel Granollers (Argentina) Horacio Zeballos | 3 | 4
6 | (United States) Rajeev Ram (United Kingdom) Joe Salisbury | 6 | 6

=== Green group ===
| | | (Croatia) Dodig (United States) Krajicek | (Mexico) S González (France) Roger-Vasselin | (Spain) Granollers (Argentina) Zeballos | (Argentina) M González (Argentina) Molteni | RR W–L | Set W–L | Game W–L | Standings |
| 1 | (Croatia) Ivan Dodig (United States) Austin Krajicek | | 4–6, 6–3, [13–15] | 4–6, 4–6 | 6–4, 6–2 | 1–2 | 3–4 (43%) | 30–28 (52%) | 3 |
| 4 | (Mexico) Santiago González (France) Édouard Roger-Vasselin | 6–4, 3–6, [15–13] | | 6–2, 3–6, [7–10] | 6–4, 6–4 | 2–1 | 5–3 (63%) | 31–27 (53%) | 2 |
| 5 | (Spain) Marcel Granollers (Argentina) Horacio Zeballos | 6–4, 6–4 | 2–6, 6–3, [10–7] | | 6–3, 6–4 | 3–0 | 6–1 (86%) | 33–24 (58%) | 1 |
| 7 | (Argentina) Máximo González (Argentina) Andrés Molteni | 4–6, 2–6 | 4–6, 4–6 | 3–6, 4–6 | | 0–3 | 0–6 (0%) | 21–36 (37%) | 4 |

=== Red group ===
| | | (Netherlands) Koolhof (United Kingdom) Skupski | (India) Bopanna (Australia) Ebden | (United States) Ram (United Kingdom) Salisbury | (Australia) Hijikata (Australia) Kubler | RR W–L | Set W–L | Game W–L | Standings |
| 2 | (Netherlands) Wesley Koolhof (United Kingdom) Neal Skupski | | 4–6, 6–7^{(5–7)} | 3–6, 6–3, [7–10] | 6–3, 6–4 | 1–2 | 3–4 (43%) | 31–30 (51%) | 3 |
| 3 | (India) Rohan Bopanna (Australia) Matthew Ebden | 6–4, 7–6^{(7–5)} | | 3–6, 4–6 | 6–4, 6–4 | 2–1 | 4–2 (67%) | 32–30 (52%) | 2 |
| 6 | (United States) Rajeev Ram (United Kingdom) Joe Salisbury | 6–3, 3–6, [10–7] | 6–3, 6–4 | | 5–7, 6–1, [10–2] | 3–0 | 6–2 (75%) | 34–24 (59%) | 1 |
| 8 | (Australia) Rinky Hijikata (Australia) Jason Kubler | 3–6, 4–6 | 4–6, 4–6 | 7–5, 1–6, [2–10] | | 0–3 | 1–6 (14%) | 23–36 (39%) | 4 |

Standings are determined by: 1. number of wins; 2. number of matches; 3. in two-teams-ties, head-to-head records; 4. in three-teams-ties, percentage of sets won, then percentage of games won; 5. ATP rankings.
