= 2023 ATP Finals – Singles =

2023 tennis tournament

Singles
- 2023 ATP Finals

Final
- Champion: (Serbia) Novak Djokovic
- Runner-up: (Italy) Jannik Sinner
- Score: 6–3, 6–3

Details
- Draw: 8 (round robin)

Events
Singles	Doubles
- ATP Finals

Defending champion Novak Djokovic defeated Jannik Sinner in the final, 6–3, 6–3 to win the singles tennis title at the 2023 ATP Finals. It was his record seventh ATP Finals title, surpassing Roger Federer's achievement. Djokovic also surpassed his own record as the oldest singles champion in the tournament's history, at 36 years, 181 days old, and extended his record of the longest timespan between first and last Tour Finals titles won, at 15 years (the first being in 2008). Djokovic claimed the year-end No. 1 ranking for a record-extending eighth time after winning his first round-robin match; Carlos Alcaraz was also in contention for the year-end top spot.

Holger Rune and Alcaraz made their debuts at the event. Sinner made his debut as a direct qualifier, after playing two matches as an alternate in 2021.

== Seeds ==
1. (Serbia) Novak Djokovic (champion)
2. (Spain) Carlos Alcaraz (semifinals)
3. Daniil Medvedev (semifinals)
4. (Italy) Jannik Sinner (final)
5. Andrey Rublev (round robin)
6. (Greece) Stefanos Tsitsipas (round robin, withdrew due to back injury)
7. (Germany) Alexander Zverev (round robin)
8. (Denmark) Holger Rune (round robin)

== Alternates ==
1. (Poland) Hubert Hurkacz (replaced Tsitsipas, round robin)
2. (United States) Taylor Fritz (did not play)

== Draw ==
=== Finals ===
Semifinals
4	(Italy) Jannik Sinner	6	6^{4}	6
3	Daniil Medvedev	3	7^{7}	1
2	(Spain) Carlos Alcaraz	3	2
1	(Serbia) Novak Djokovic	6	6

Final
4	(Italy) Jannik Sinner	3	3
1	(Serbia) Novak Djokovic	6	6

=== Green group ===
		(Serbia) Djokovic	(Italy) Sinner	(Greece) Tsitsipas (Poland) Hurkacz	(Denmark) Rune	RR W–L	Set W–L	Game W–L	Standings
1	(Serbia) Novak Djokovic		5–7, 7–6^{(7–5)}, 6–7^{(2–7)}	7–6^{(7–1)}, 4–6, 6–1 (w/ Hurkacz)	7–6^{(7–4)}, 6–7^{(1–7)}, 6–3	2–1	5–4 (56%)	54–49 (52%)	2
4	(Italy) Jannik Sinner	7–5, 6–7^{(5–7)}, 7–6^{(7–2)}		6–4, 6–4 (w/ Tsitsipas)	6–2, 5–7, 6–4	3–0	6–2 (75%)	49–39 (56%)	1
6; 9	(Greece) Stefanos Tsitsipas (Poland) Hubert Hurkacz	6–7^{(1–7)}, 6–4, 1–6 (w/ Hurkacz)	4–6, 4–6 (w/ Tsitsipas)		1–2 ret. (w/ Tsitsipas)	0–2; 0–1	0–4 (0%) (Note: Following ATP rules, Tsitsipas's retirement against Rune was counted as a straight-set loss in determining round robin standings (games 0–0).); 1–2 (33%)	8–12 (40%); 13–17 (43%)	X 4
8	(Denmark) Holger Rune	6–7^{(4–7)}, 7–6^{(7–1)}, 3–6	2–6, 7–5, 4–6	2–1 ret. (w/ Tsitsipas)		1–2	4–4 (50%)	29–36 (45%)	3

=== Red group ===
		(Spain) Alcaraz	Medvedev	Rublev	(Germany) Zverev	RR W–L	Set W–L	Game W–L	Standings
2	(Spain) Carlos Alcaraz		6–4, 6–4	7–5, 6–2	7–6^{(7–3)}, 3–6, 4–6	2–1	5–2 (71%)	39–33 (54%)	1
3	Daniil Medvedev	4–6, 4–6		6–4, 6–2	7–6^{(9–7)}, 6–4	2–1	4–2 (67%)	33–28 (54%)	2
5	Andrey Rublev	5–7, 2–6	4–6, 2–6		4–6, 4–6	0–3	0–6 (0%)	21–37 (36%)	4
7	(Germany) Alexander Zverev	6–7^{(3–7)}, 6–3, 6–4	6–7^{(7–9)}, 4–6	6–4, 6–4		2–1	4–3 (57%)	40–35 (53%)	3

Standings are determined by: 1. number of wins; 2. number of matches played; 3. in two-players-ties, head-to-head records; 4. in three-players-ties, percentage of sets won, then percentage of games won; 5. ATP rankings.
