= 2023 Swiss Indoors =

- Date: 23–29 October
- Edition: 52nd
- Category: ATP Tour 500
- Draw: 32S / 16D
- Prize money: €2,196,000
- Surface: Hard / indoor
- Location: Basel, Switzerland
- Venue: St. Jakobshalle

Champions

Singles
- (Canada) Félix Auger-Aliassime

Doubles
- (Mexico) Santiago González / (France) Édouard Roger-Vasselin
- Swiss Indoors

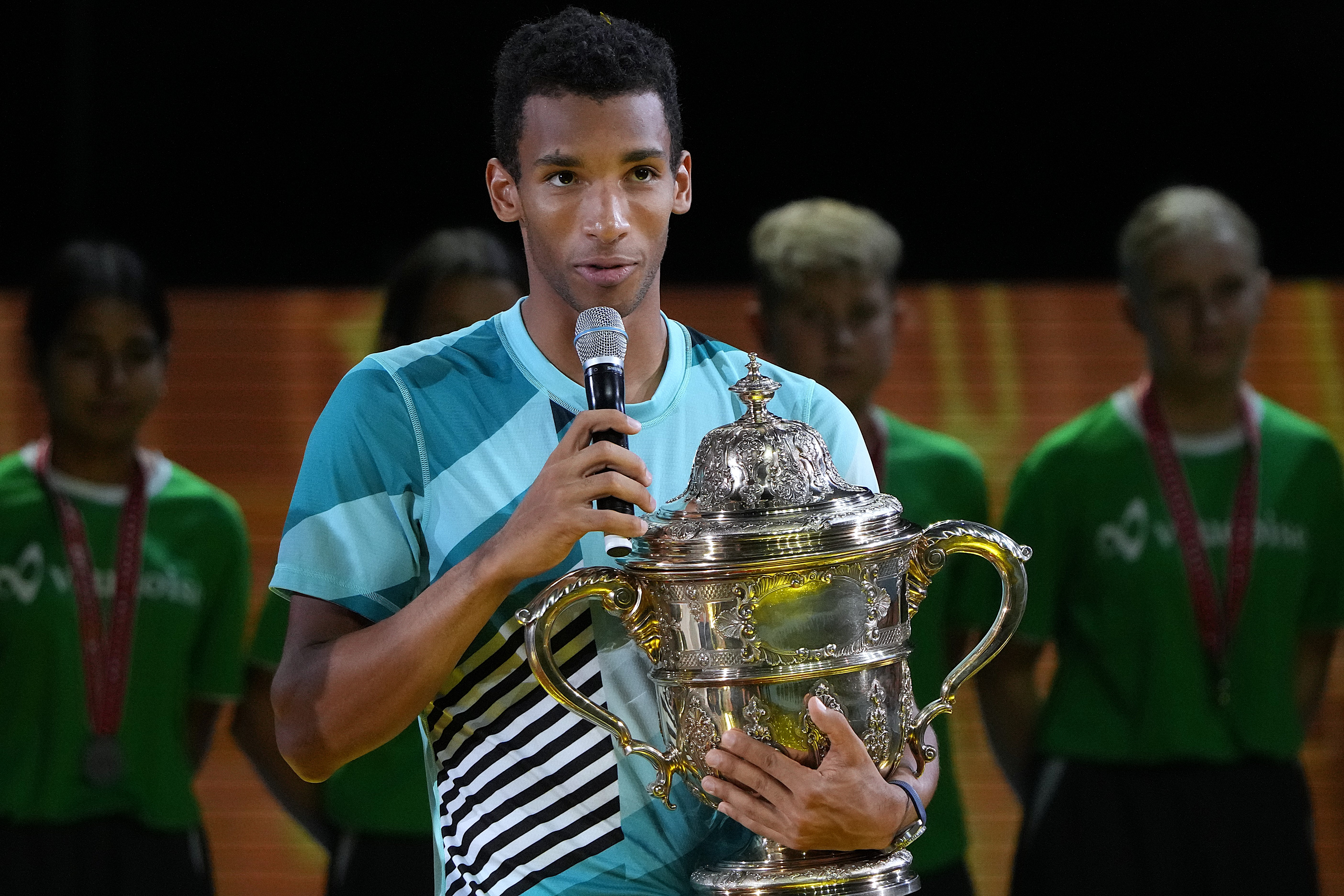
Félix Auger-Aliassime, Swiss Indoors Basel 2023

The 2023 Swiss Indoors was a men's tennis tournament played on indoor hard courts. It was the 52nd edition of the event, and part of the 500 series of the 2023 ATP Tour. It was held at the St. Jakobshalle in Basel, Switzerland, from 23 October until 29 October 2023. Sixth-seeded Félix Auger-Aliassime won his second consecutive singles title at the event.

== Finals ==
=== Singles ===
- (Canada) Félix Auger-Aliassime def. (Poland) Hubert Hurkacz, 7–6^{(7–3)}, 7–6^{(7–5)}

=== Doubles ===
- (Mexico) Santiago González / (France) Édouard Roger-Vasselin def. (Monaco) Hugo Nys / (Poland) Jan Zieliński, 6–7^{(8–10)}, 7–6^{(7–3)}, [10–1]

== Singles main draw entrants ==
=== Seeds ===
Country	Player	Rank^{1}	Seed
DEN	Holger Rune	6	1
NOR	Casper Ruud	8	2
USA	Taylor Fritz	10	3
POL	Hubert Hurkacz	11	4
AUS	Alex de Minaur	13	5
CAN	Félix Auger-Aliassime	17	6
CHI	Nicolás Jarry	21	7
USA	Sebastian Korda	23	8

- Rankings are as of 16 October 2023

=== Other entrants ===
The following players received wildcards into the singles main draw:

- (Canada) Félix Auger-Aliassime
- (Switzerland) Dominic Stricker
- (Switzerland) Leandro Riedi

The following player received entry into the singles main draw as a special exempt:

- (United States) Marcos Giron

The following players received entry from the qualifying draw:

- (Lebanon) Benjamin Hassan
- (Australia) Christopher O'Connell
- Alexander Shevchenko
- (Netherlands) Botic van de Zandschulp

The following player received entry as a lucky loser:

- (Brazil) Thiago Seyboth Wild

=== Withdrawals ===
- (Spain) Carlos Alcaraz → replaced by (Switzerland) Stan Wawrinka
- (Spain) Alejandro Davidovich Fokina → replaced by (Germany) Yannick Hanfmann
- (Serbia) Laslo Djere → replaced by (Brazil) Thiago Seyboth Wild
- (Canada) Milos Raonic → replaced by (Serbia) Miomir Kecmanović

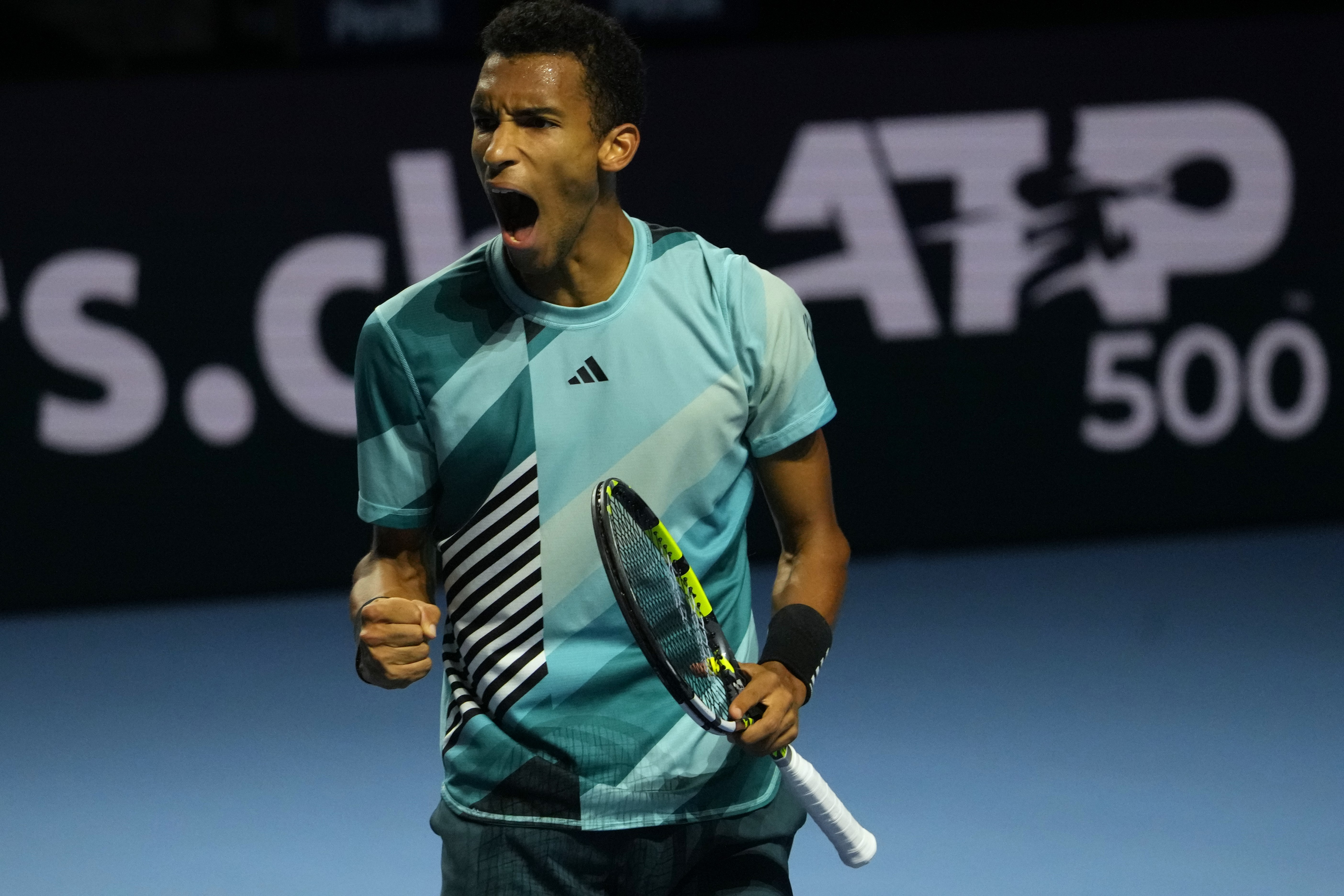
Félix Auger-Aliassime after the final match at Swiss Indoors Basel (Peter Arnold).

== Doubles main draw entrants ==
=== Seeds ===
Country	Player	Country	Player	Rank^{1}	Seed
CRO	Ivan Dodig	USA	Austin Krajicek	3	1
ARG	Máximo González	ARG	Andrés Molteni	23	2
MEX	Santiago González	FRA	Édouard Roger-Vasselin	27	3
GBR	Jamie Murray	NZL	Michael Venus	37	4

- ^{1} Rankings as of 16 October 2023

=== Other entrants ===
The following pairs received wildcards into the doubles main draw:

- (Switzerland) Mika Brunold / (Switzerland) Marc-Andrea Hüsler
- (Switzerland) Leandro Riedi / (Switzerland) Dominic Stricker

The following pair received entry from the qualifying draw:

- (Germany) Constantin Frantzen / (Germany) Hendrik Jebens

The following pair received entry as lucky losers:

- (Serbia) Nikola Ćaćić / (Romania) Victor Vlad Cornea

=== Withdrawals ===
- (Spain) Marcel Granollers / (Argentina) Horacio Zeballos → replaced by (Serbia) Nikola Ćaćić / (Romania) Victor Vlad Cornea
