= 2023 Swiss Indoors – Doubles =

Doubles
- 2023 Swiss Indoors

Final
- Champions: (Mexico) Santiago González (France) Édouard Roger-Vasselin
- Runners-up: (Monaco) Hugo Nys (Poland) Jan Zieliński
- Score: 6–7^{(8–10)}, 7–6^{(7–3)}, [10–1]

Details
- Draw: 16
- Seeds: 4

Events
Singles	Doubles
← 2022 ·	Swiss Indoors	· 2024 →

Santiago González and Édouard Roger-Vasselin defeated Hugo Nys and Jan Zieliński in the final, 6–7^{(8–10)}, 7–6^{(7–3)}, [10–1] to win the doubles tennis title at the 2023 Swiss Indoors.

Ivan Dodig and Austin Krajicek were the defending champions, but lost in the quarterfinals to Nys and Zieliński.

Krajicek retained the ATP No. 1 doubles ranking after Wesley Koolhof lost in the first round in Vienna.

== Seeds ==
1. (Croatia) Ivan Dodig / (United States) Austin Krajicek (quarterfinals)
2. (Argentina) Máximo González / (Argentina) Andrés Molteni (first round)
3. (Mexico) Santiago González / (France) Édouard Roger-Vasselin (champions)
4. (United Kingdom) Jamie Murray / (New Zealand) Michael Venus (semifinals)

== Draw ==
=== Key ===
- Q = Qualifier
- WC = Wild card
- LL = Lucky loser
- Alt = Alternate
- SE = Special exempt
- PR = Protected ranking
- ITF = ITF entry
- JE = Junior exempt
- w/o = Walkover
- r = Retired
- d = Defaulted
- SR = Special ranking

=== Draw ===
First round
1	(Croatia) I Dodig (United States) A Krajicek	6	6
(Canada) F Auger-Aliassime (United States) S Korda	2	4
(Netherlands) T Griekspoor (Netherlands) R Haase	6^{5}	3
(Monaco) H Nys (Poland) J Zieliński	7^{7}	6
4	(United Kingdom) J Murray (New Zealand) M Venus	4	7^{7}	[10]
(Kazakhstan) A Bublik (France) A Mannarino	6	6^{3}	[6]
LL	(Serbia) N Ćaćić (Romania) VV Cornea	6	7^{7}
WC	(Switzerland) M Brunold (Switzerland) M-A Hüsler	3	6^{4}
WC	(Switzerland) L Riedi (Switzerland) D Stricker	4	5
(Finland) H Heliövaara (Croatia) M Pavić	6	7
Q	(Germany) C Frantzen (Germany) H Jebens	5	6^{10}
3	(Mexico) S González (France) É Roger-Vasselin	7	7^{12}
(United Kingdom) L Glasspool (France) N Mahut	5	6^{5}
(Australia) A de Minaur (Australia) M Purcell	7	7^{7}
(Germany) K Krawietz (Germany) T Pütz	6	5	[10]
2	(Argentina) M González (Argentina) A Molteni	2	7	[5]

Quarterfinals
1	(Croatia) I Dodig (United States) A Krajicek	3	6	[7]
(Monaco) H Nys (Poland) J Zieliński	6	3	[10]
4	(United Kingdom) J Murray (New Zealand) M Venus	6	7^{7}
LL	(Serbia) N Ćaćić (Romania) VV Cornea	2	6^{2}
(Finland) H Heliövaara (Croatia) M Pavić	7^{7}	3	[11]
3	(Mexico) S González (France) É Roger-Vasselin	6^{2}	6	[13]
(Australia) A de Minaur (Australia) M Purcell	3	4
(Germany) K Krawietz (Germany) T Pütz	6	6

Semifinals
(Monaco) H Nys (Poland) J Zieliński	4	6	[10]
4	(United Kingdom) J Murray (New Zealand) M Venus	6	4	[7]
3	(Mexico) S González (France) É Roger-Vasselin	6	6
(Germany) K Krawietz (Germany) T Pütz	4	4

Final
(Monaco) H Nys (Poland) J Zieliński	7^{10}	6^{3}	[1]
3	(Mexico) S González (France) É Roger-Vasselin	6^{8}	7^{7}	[10]

== Qualifying ==
=== Seeds ===
1. (Serbia) Nikola Ćaćić / (Romania) Victor Vlad Cornea (qualifying competition, lucky losers)
2. (Germany) Constantin Frantzen / (Germany) Hendrik Jebens (qualified)

=== Qualifiers ===
1. (Germany) Constantin Frantzen / (Germany) Hendrik Jebens

=== Lucky losers ===
1. (Serbia) Nikola Ćaćić / (Romania) Victor Vlad Cornea

=== Qualifying draw ===
First round
1	(Serbia) Nikola Ćaćić (Romania) Victor Vlad Cornea	6	7^{7}
WC	(Switzerland) Rémy Bertola (Switzerland) Jan Sebesta	1	6^{4}
(New Zealand) Finn Reynolds (Israel) Roy Stepanov	3	4
2	(Germany) Constantin Frantzen (Germany) Hendrik Jebens	6	6

Qualifying competition
1	(Serbia) Nikola Ćaćić (Romania) Victor Vlad Cornea	3	4
2	(Germany) Constantin Frantzen (Germany) Hendrik Jebens	6	6
