= 2023 National Bank Open – Men's doubles =

Men's doubles
- 2023 National Bank Open

Final
- Champions: (El Salvador) Marcelo Arévalo (Netherlands) Jean-Julien Rojer
- Runners-up: (United States) Rajeev Ram (United Kingdom) Joe Salisbury
- Score: 6–3, 6–1

Details
- Draw: 28
- Seeds: 8

Events
Singles	men	women
Doubles	men	women
- National Bank Open

Marcelo Arévalo and Jean-Julien Rojer defeated Rajeev Ram and Joe Salisbury in the final, 6–3, 6–1 to win the men's doubles tennis title at the 2023 Canadian Open. It was Arévalo's first ATP Tour Masters 1000 title, and Rojer's fourth.

Wesley Koolhof and Neal Skupski were the defending champions, but lost in the second round to Hubert Hurkacz and Mate Pavić.

== Seeds ==
The top four seeds received a bye into the second round.

1. (Netherlands) Wesley Koolhof / (United Kingdom) Neal Skupski (second round)
2. (Croatia) Ivan Dodig / (United States) Austin Krajicek (second round)
3. (United States) Rajeev Ram / (United Kingdom) Joe Salisbury (final)
4. (India) Rohan Bopanna / (Australia) Matthew Ebden (quarterfinals)
5. (Monaco) Hugo Nys / (Poland) Jan Zieliński (first round)
6. (Germany) Kevin Krawietz / (Germany) Tim Pütz (semifinals)
7. (Spain) Marcel Granollers / (Argentina) Horacio Zeballos (semifinals)
8. (Mexico) Santiago González / (France) Édouard Roger-Vasselin (quarterfinals)

== Draw ==
Key

- Q = Qualifier
- WC = Wild card
- LL = Lucky loser
- Alt = Alternate
- ITF = ITF entry
- PR = Protected ranking
- SR = Special ranking
- SE = Special exempt
- JE = Junior exempt
- JR = Junior Accelerator Programme entrant
- CO = College Accelerator Programme entrant
- NG = Next Gen Accelerator Program entrant
- w/o = Walkover
- r = Retired
- d = Defaulted

=== Finals ===
Semifinals
6	(Germany) Kevin Krawietz (Germany) Tim Pütz	4	4
3	(United States) Rajeev Ram (United Kingdom) Joe Salisbury	6	6
7	(Spain) Marcel Granollers (Argentina) Horacio Zeballos	3	6	[5]
(El Salvador) Marcelo Arévalo (Netherlands) Jean-Julien Rojer	6	3	[10]

Final
3	(United States) Rajeev Ram (United Kingdom) Joe Salisbury	3	1
(El Salvador) Marcelo Arévalo (Netherlands) Jean-Julien Rojer	6	6

=== Top half ===
First round
(Poland) H Hurkacz (Croatia) M Pavić	6	7
(United Kingdom) L Glasspool (Finland) H Heliövaara	2	5
WC	(Canada) B Sigouin (Canada) K Stevenson	5	4
WC	(France) N Mahut (Canada) V Pospisil	7	6
Alt	(Canada) P Polansky (Canada) A Shamasdin	3	2
6	(Germany) K Krawietz (Germany) T Pütz	6	6
(Brazil) M Melo (Australia) J Peers	6^{6}	6	[7]
(Belgium) S Gillé (Belgium) J Vliegen	7^{8}	2	[10]
(United States) N Lammons (United States) J Withrow	6	7^{7}
(Netherlands) R Haase (Croatia) N Mektić	2	6^{5}
(Australia) M Purcell; A Rublev	7	6
5	(Monaco) H Nys (Poland) J Zieliński	5	4

Second round
1	(Netherlands) W Koolhof (United Kingdom) N Skupski	7^{7}	6^{2}	[5]
(Poland) H Hurkacz (Croatia) M Pavić	6^{2}	7^{7}	[10]
WC	(France) N Mahut (Canada) V Pospisil	2	4
6	(Germany) K Krawietz (Germany) T Pütz	6	6
3	(United States) R Ram (United Kingdom) J Salisbury	6^{3}	6	[12]
(Belgium) S Gillé (Belgium) J Vliegen	7^{7}	3	[10]
(United States) N Lammons (United States) J Withrow	6^{5}	6^{7}
(Australia) M Purcell; A Rublev	7^{7}	7^{9}

Quarterfinals
(Poland) H Hurkacz (Croatia) M Pavić	5	3
6	(Germany) K Krawietz (Germany) T Pütz	7	6
3	(United States) R Ram (United Kingdom) J Salisbury	4	6	[10]
(Australia) M Purcell; A Rublev	6	3	[4]

Semifinals
6	(Germany) K Krawietz (Germany) T Pütz	4	4
3	(United States) R Ram (United Kingdom) J Salisbury	6	6

=== Bottom half ===
First round
7	(Spain) M Granollers (Argentina) H Zeballos	6	6
WC	(Canada) G Diallo (Canada) A Galarneau	4	2
(Kazakhstan) A Bublik (France) A Mannarino	3	4
(France) F Martin (Germany) A Mies	6	6
(Argentina) F Cerúndolo (Argentina) TM Etcheverry	6^{5}	3
(United Kingdom) J Murray (New Zealand) M Venus	7^{7}	6
8	(Mexico) S González (France) É Roger-Vasselin	6	6^{6}	[10]
(Netherlands) T Griekspoor (Czech Republic) J Lehečka	2	7^{8}	[6]
(Argentina) M González (Argentina) A Molteni	3	5
Alt	(France) S Doumbia (France) F Reboul	6	7
(Australia) A de Minaur (Italy) J Sinner	6	3	[4]
(El Salvador) M Arévalo (Netherlands) J-J Rojer	4	6	[10]

Second round
7	(Spain) M Granollers (Argentina) H Zeballos	4
(France) F Martin (Germany) A Mies	4^{r}
(United Kingdom) J Murray (New Zealand) M Venus	3	3
4	(India) R Bopanna (Australia) M Ebden	6	6
8	(Mexico) S González (France) É Roger-Vasselin	6	6^{3}	[12]
Alt	(France) S Doumbia (France) F Reboul	3	7^{7}	[10]
(El Salvador) M Arévalo (Netherlands) J-J Rojer	6	7^{7}
2	(Croatia) I Dodig (United States) A Krajicek	3	6^{4}

Quarterfinals
7	(Spain) M Granollers (Argentina) H Zeballos	7	6^{6}	[10]
4	(India) R Bopanna (Australia) M Ebden	5	7^{8}	[8]
8	(Mexico) S González (France) É Roger-Vasselin	0	7^{7}	[8]
(El Salvador) M Arévalo (Netherlands) J-J Rojer	6	6^{4}	[10]

Semifinals
7	(Spain) M Granollers (Argentina) H Zeballos	3	6	[5]
(El Salvador) M Arévalo (Netherlands) J-J Rojer	6	3	[10]

== Seeded teams ==
The following are the seeded teams. Seedings are based on ATP rankings as of 31 July 2023.

Country	Player	Country	Player	Rank^{1}	Seed
NED	Wesley Koolhof	GBR	Neal Skupski	2	1
CRO	Ivan Dodig	USA	Austin Krajicek	7	2
USA	Rajeev Ram	GBR	Joe Salisbury	11	3
IND	Rohan Bopanna	AUS	Matthew Ebden	19	4
MON	Hugo Nys	POL	Jan Zieliński	20	5
GER	Kevin Krawietz	GER	Tim Pütz	24	6
ESP	Marcel Granollers	ARG	Horacio Zeballos	26	7
MEX	Santiago González	FRA	Édouard Roger-Vasselin	26	8

== Other entry information ==
=== Wild cards ===
- (Canada) Gabriel Diallo / (Canada) Alexis Galarneau
- (France) Nicolas Mahut / (Canada) Vasek Pospisil
- (Canada) Benjamin Sigouin / (Canada) Kelsey Stevenson

=== Alternates ===
- (France) Sadio Doumbia / (France) Fabien Reboul
- (Canada) Peter Polansky / (Canada) Adil Shamasdin

=== Withdrawals ===
- (Spain) Alejandro Davidovich Fokina / (Greece) Stefanos Tsitsipas → replaced by (Canada) Peter Polansky / (Canada) Adil Shamasdin
- (Australia) Rinky Hijikata / (Australia) Jason Kubler → replaced by (Netherlands) Tallon Griekspoor / (Czech Republic) Jiří Lehečka
- (United States) Sebastian Korda / (United States) Frances Tiafoe → replaced by (France) Sadio Doumbia / (France) Fabien Reboul
