= 2023 Swiss Indoors – Singles =

Singles
- 2023 Swiss Indoors

Final
- Champion: (Canada) Félix Auger-Aliassime
- Runner-up: (Poland) Hubert Hurkacz
- Score: 7–6^{(7–3)}, 7–6^{(7–5)}

Details
- Draw: 32 (4 Q / 3 WC )
- Seeds: 8

Events
Singles	Doubles
← 2022 ·	Swiss Indoors	· 2024 →

Defending champion Félix Auger-Aliassime defeated Hubert Hurkacz in the final, 7–6^{(7–3)}, 7–6^{(7–5)} to win the singles tennis title at the 2023 Swiss Indoors. He saved a match point en route to his fifth career ATP Tour title (and his first in a year), in the quarterfinals against Alexander Shevchenko.

== Seeds ==
1. (Denmark) Holger Rune (semifinals)
2. (Norway) Casper Ruud (second round)
3. (United States) Taylor Fritz (second round)
4. (Poland) Hubert Hurkacz (final)
5. (Australia) Alex de Minaur (second round)
6. (Canada) Félix Auger-Aliassime (champion)
7. (Chile) Nicolás Jarry (second round)
8. (United States) Sebastian Korda (first round)

== Draw ==
=== Key ===
- Q = Qualifier
- WC = Wild card
- LL = Lucky loser
- Alt = Alternate
- SE = Special exempt
- PR = Protected ranking
- ITF = ITF entry
- JE = Junior exempt
- w/o = Walkover
- r = Retired
- d = Defaulted
- SR = Special ranking

=== Finals ===
Semifinals
1	(Denmark) Holger Rune	3	2
6/WC	(Canada) Félix Auger-Aliassime	6	6
4	(Poland) Hubert Hurkacz	6	3	7^{7}
(France) Ugo Humbert	4	6	6^{5}

Final
6/WC	(Canada) Félix Auger-Aliassime	7^{7}	7^{7}
4	(Poland) Hubert Hurkacz	6^{3}	6^{5}

=== Top half ===
First round
1	(Denmark) H Rune	1	7	6
(Serbia) M Kecmanović	6	5	3
Q	(Australia) C O'Connell	7^{7}	4	3
(Argentina) S Báez	6^{3}	6	6
(United Kingdom) A Murray	7	6
(Germany) Y Hanfmann	5	4
(Argentina) TM Etcheverry	6	1	6
8	(United States) S Korda	3	6	3
3	(United States) T Fritz	7^{9}	7^{7}
(Australia) M Purcell	6^{7}	6^{4}
(Switzerland) S Wawrinka	3	6^{8}
Q	A Shevchenko	6	7^{10}
Q	(Netherlands) B van de Zandschulp	7	6^{3}	6
(Spain) R Bautista Agut	5	7^{7}	2
WC	(Switzerland) L Riedi	3	2
6/WC	(Canada) F Auger-Aliassime	6	6

Second round
1	(Denmark) H Rune	7^{7}	6
(Argentina) S Báez	6^{2}	1
(United Kingdom) A Murray	7^{7}	3	2
(Argentina) TM Etcheverry	6^{5}	6	6
3	(United States) T Fritz	7^{9}	6^{6}	6^{5}
Q	A Shevchenko	6^{7}	7^{8}	7^{7}
Q	(Netherlands) B van de Zandschulp	4	2
6/WC	(Canada) F Auger-Aliassime	6	6

Quarterfinals
1	(Denmark) H Rune	6	3	7^{8}
(Argentina) TM Etcheverry	1	6	6^{6}
Q	A Shevchenko	6^{2}	6	6^{1}
6/WC	(Canada) F Auger-Aliassime	7^{7}	3	7^{7}

Semifinals
1	(Denmark) H Rune	3	2
6/WC	(Canada) F Auger-Aliassime	6	6

=== Bottom half ===
First round
5	(Australia) A de Minaur	6	6
(Argentina) D Schwartzman	4	4
(Netherlands) T Griekspoor	7^{7}	2	6
LL	(Brazil) T Seyboth Wild	6^{4}	6	3
(Germany) J-L Struff	7^{9}	6
(United States) C Eubanks	6^{7}	4
(Serbia) D Lajović	6^{2}	3
4	(Poland) H Hurkacz	7^{7}	6
7	(Chile) N Jarry	7^{8}	6^{2}	6
(France) A Mannarino	6^{6}	7^{7}	4
(France) U Humbert	6	4	7^{7}
SE	(United States) M Giron	3	6	6^{3}
WC	(Switzerland) D Stricker	7^{7}	6
Q	(Lebanon) B Hassan	6^{2}	2
(Kazakhstan) A Bublik	6^{5}	2
2	(Norway) C Ruud	7^{7}	6

Second round
5	(Australia) A de Minaur	4	3
(Netherlands) T Griekspoor	6	6
(Germany) J-L Struff	1	4
4	(Poland) H Hurkacz	6	6
7	(Chile) N Jarry	6^{3}	6^{4}
(France) U Humbert	7^{7}	7^{7}
WC	(Switzerland) D Stricker	6	3	7^{7}
2	(Norway) C Ruud	4	6	6^{1}

Quarterfinals
(Netherlands) T Griekspoor	7^{8}	4	4
4	(Poland) H Hurkacz	6^{6}	6	6
(France) U Humbert	6	2	6
WC	(Switzerland) D Stricker	4	6	2

Semifinals
4	(Poland) H Hurkacz	6	3	7^{7}
(France) U Humbert	4	6	6^{5}

== Qualifying ==
=== Seeds ===
1. (Australia) Christopher O'Connell (qualified)
2. (Australia) Jordan Thompson (withdrew)
3. (Netherlands) Botic van de Zandschulp (qualified)
4. (Argentina) Pedro Cachin (first round)
5. (Brazil) Thiago Seyboth Wild (qualifying competition, lucky loser)
6. (Germany) Dominik Koepfer (qualifying competition)
7. (France) Arthur Rinderknech (qualifying competition)
8. Alexander Shevchenko (qualified)

=== Qualifiers ===
1. (Australia) Christopher O'Connell
2. (Lebanon) Benjamin Hassan
3. (Netherlands) Botic van de Zandschulp
4. Alexander Shevchenko

=== Lucky loser ===
1. (Brazil) Thiago Seyboth Wild

=== Qualifying draw ===
==== First qualifier ====
First round
1	(Australia) Christopher O'Connell	7^{7}	7
(United States) Maxime Cressy	6^{3}	5
(United States) Michael Mmoh	5	6	3
5	(Brazil) Thiago Seyboth Wild	7	4	6

Qualifying competition
1	(Australia) Christopher O'Connell	7^{7}	7^{7}
5	(Brazil) Thiago Seyboth Wild	6^{4}	6^{4}

==== Second qualifier ====
First round
Alt	(Lebanon) Benjamin Hassan	6	5	7^{7}
(Serbia) Hamad Medjedovic	2	7	6^{3}
Alt	(India) Sumit Nagal	6	1	6^{3}
6	(Germany) Dominik Koepfer	3	6	7^{7}

Qualifying competition
Alt	(Lebanon) Benjamin Hassan	6	2	6
6	(Germany) Dominik Koepfer	2	6	4

==== Third qualifier ====
First round
3	(Netherlands) Botic van de Zandschulp	6	7^{7}
WC	(Switzerland) Mika Brunold	1	6^{5}
WC	(Switzerland) Marc-Andrea Hüsler	4	3
7	(France) Arthur Rinderknech	6	6

Qualifying competition
3	(Netherlands) Botic van de Zandschulp	7^{7}	6
7	(France) Arthur Rinderknech	6^{4}	3

==== Fourth qualifier ====
First round
4	(Argentina) Pedro Cachin	3	6	4
WC	(Switzerland) Rémy Bertola	6	3	6
(Italy) Fabio Fognini	4	7	0
8	Alexander Shevchenko	6	5	6

Qualifying competition
WC	(Switzerland) Rémy Bertola	3	5
8	Alexander Shevchenko	6	7
