= 2023 ATP Tour =

Men's tennis circuit

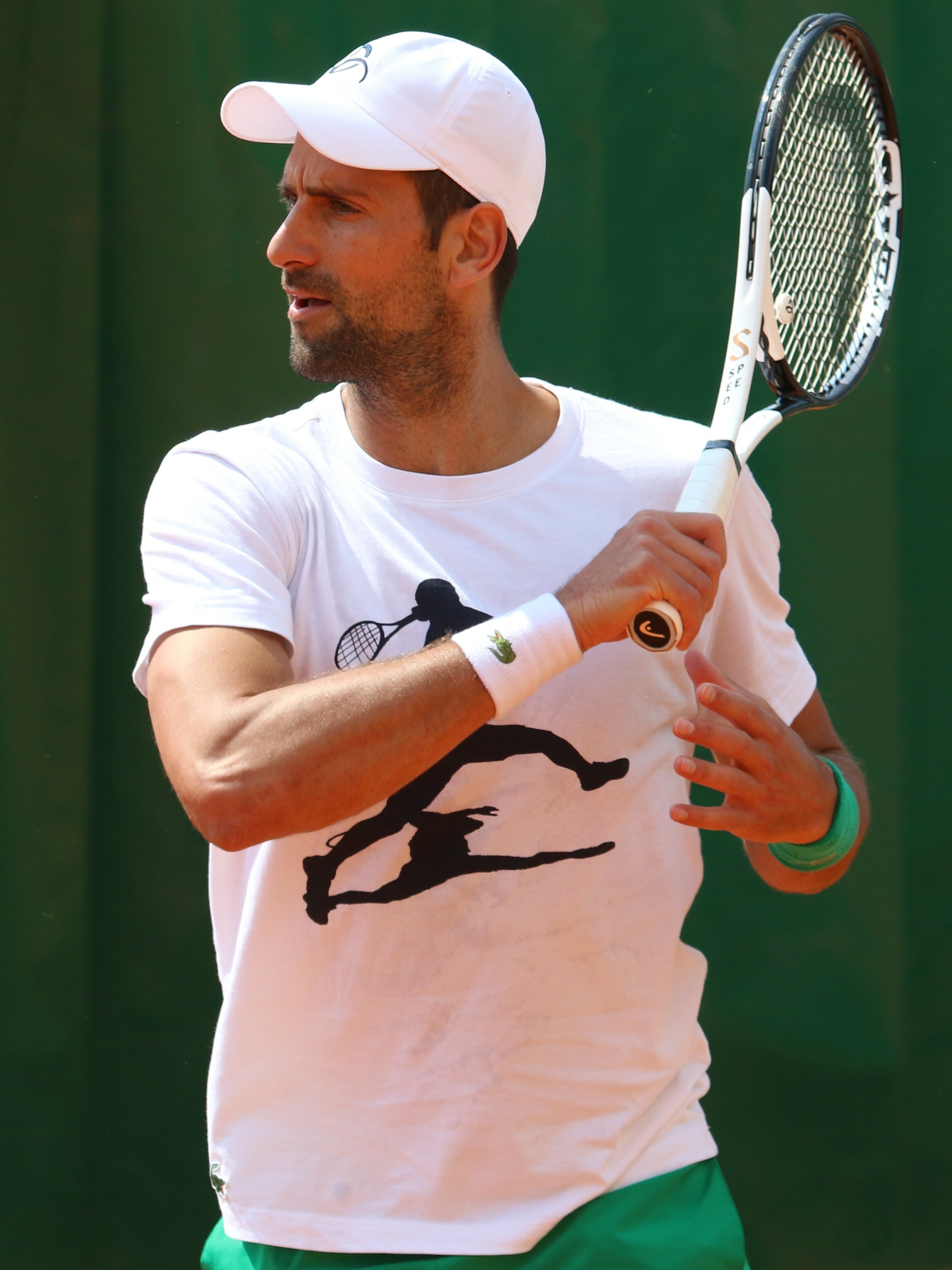
- Novak Djokovic finished the year as world No. 1 for a record-extending eighth time in his career. He won seven tournaments during the season, including three majors at the Australian Open, French Open, and US Open. He also won the ATP Finals and two Masters events, and finished runner-up at the fourth major, the Wimbledon Championships.

Details
- Duration: 29 Dec 2022 – 2 Dec 2023
- Edition: 54th
- Tournaments: 68
- Categories: Grand Slam (4); ATP Finals; ATP Masters 1000 (9); ATP 500 (13); ATP 250 (38); Next Generation finals Davis Cup; United Cup; Laver Cup; Hopman Cup

Achievements (singles)
- Most titles: (Serbia) Novak Djokovic (7)
- Most finals: Daniil Medvedev (9)
- Prize money leader: (Serbia) Novak Djokovic ($15,952,044)
- Points leader: (Serbia) Novak Djokovic (9,945)

Awards
- Player of the year: (Serbia) Novak Djokovic
- Doubles team of the year: (Croatia) Ivan Dodig; (United States) Austin Krajicek
- Most improved player of the year: (Italy) Jannik Sinner
- Newcomer of the year: (France) Arthur Fils
- Comeback player of the year: (Germany) Jan-Lennard Struff

The 2023 ATP Tour was the global elite men's professional tennis circuit organised by the Association of Tennis Professionals (ATP) for the 2023 tennis season. The 2023 ATP Tour calendar comprised the Grand Slam tournaments, supervised by the International Tennis Federation (ITF), the ATP Finals, the ATP Tour Masters 1000, the United Cup, the ATP 500 series, the ATP 250 series. Also included in the 2023 calendar were the Davis Cup (organised by the ITF), Next Gen ATP Finals, Laver Cup, Hopman Cup (sanctioned by the ITF), none of which distributed ranking points. 2023 marked the return of the ATP tournaments in China after strict COVID-19 protocols in the country.

== Schedule ==
This is the schedule of events on the 2023 calendar.

Key
Grand Slam
ATP Finals
ATP Masters 1000
ATP 500
ATP 250
Team events

=== January ===
Week	Tournament	Champions	Runners-up	Semifinalists	Quarterfinalists
2 Jan	United Cup; Brisbane/Perth/Sydney, Australia; United Cup; Hard – $7,500,000 – 18 teams	United States; 4–0	Italy	Poland; Greece	
2 Jan	Adelaide International 1 Adelaide, Australia; ATP 250; Hard – $642,735 – 32S/16Q/24D; Singles – Doubles	(Serbia) Novak Djokovic; 6–7^{(8–10)}, 7–6^{(7–3)}, 6–4	(United States) Sebastian Korda	Daniil Medvedev (Japan) Yoshihito Nishioka	(Canada) Denis Shapovalov; Karen Khachanov (Italy) Jannik Sinner (Australia) Alexei Popyrin
2 Jan	Adelaide International 1 Adelaide, Australia; ATP 250; Hard – $642,735 – 32S/16Q/24D; Singles – Doubles	(United Kingdom) Lloyd Glasspool (Finland) Harri Heliövaara; 6–3, 7–6^{(7–3)}	(United Kingdom) Jamie Murray (New Zealand) Michael Venus	Daniil Medvedev (Japan) Yoshihito Nishioka	(Canada) Denis Shapovalov; Karen Khachanov (Italy) Jannik Sinner (Australia) Alexei Popyrin
2 Jan	Maharashtra Open; Pune, India; ATP 250; Hard – $713,495 – 28S/16Q/16D; Singles – Doubles	(Netherlands) Tallon Griekspoor; 4–6, 7–5, 6–3	(France) Benjamin Bonzi	Aslan Karatsev (Netherlands) Botic van de Zandschulp	(Croatia) Marin Čilić (Spain) Pedro Martínez (Serbia) Filip Krajinović (Germany) Maximilian Marterer
2 Jan	Maharashtra Open; Pune, India; ATP 250; Hard – $713,495 – 28S/16Q/16D; Singles – Doubles	(Belgium) Sander Gillé (Belgium) Joran Vliegen; 6–4, 6–4	(India) Sriram Balaji (India) Jeevan Nedunchezhiyan	Aslan Karatsev (Netherlands) Botic van de Zandschulp	(Croatia) Marin Čilić (Spain) Pedro Martínez (Serbia) Filip Krajinović (Germany) Maximilian Marterer
9 Jan	Adelaide International 2 Adelaide, Australia; ATP 250; Hard – $642,735 – 28S/16Q/24D; Singles – Doubles	(South Korea) Kwon Soon-woo; 6–4, 3–6, 7–6^{(7–4)}	(Spain) Roberto Bautista Agut	(Australia) Thanasi Kokkinakis (United Kingdom) Jack Draper	(Serbia) Miomir Kecmanović (Spain) Alejandro Davidovich Fokina; Karen Khachanov (Sweden) Mikael Ymer
9 Jan	Adelaide International 2 Adelaide, Australia; ATP 250; Hard – $642,735 – 28S/16Q/24D; Singles – Doubles	(El Salvador) Marcelo Arévalo (Netherlands) Jean-Julien Rojer; Walkover	(Croatia) Ivan Dodig (United States) Austin Krajicek	(Australia) Thanasi Kokkinakis (United Kingdom) Jack Draper	(Serbia) Miomir Kecmanović (Spain) Alejandro Davidovich Fokina; Karen Khachanov (Sweden) Mikael Ymer
9 Jan	Auckland Open; Auckland, New Zealand; ATP 250; Hard – $713,495 – 28S/16Q/16D; Singles – Doubles	(France) Richard Gasquet; 4–6, 6–4, 6–4	(United Kingdom) Cameron Norrie	(France) Constant Lestienne (United States) Jenson Brooksby	(Serbia) Laslo Djere (Belgium) David Goffin (France) Quentin Halys (United States) Marcos Giron
9 Jan	Auckland Open; Auckland, New Zealand; ATP 250; Hard – $713,495 – 28S/16Q/16D; Singles – Doubles	(Croatia) Nikola Mektić (Croatia) Mate Pavić; 6–4, 6–7^{(5–7)}, [10–6]	(United States) Nathaniel Lammons (United States) Jackson Withrow	(France) Constant Lestienne (United States) Jenson Brooksby	(Serbia) Laslo Djere (Belgium) David Goffin (France) Quentin Halys (United States) Marcos Giron
16 Jan; 23 Jan	Australian Open; Melbourne, Australia; Grand Slam; Hard – A$34,848,000; 128S/128Q/64D/32X; Singles – Doubles – Mixed	(Serbia) Novak Djokovic; 6–3, 7–6^{(7–4)}, 7–6^{(7–5)}	(Greece) Stefanos Tsitsipas	Karen Khachanov (United States) Tommy Paul	(United States) Sebastian Korda (Czech Republic) Jiří Lehečka; Andrey Rublev (United States) Ben Shelton
16 Jan; 23 Jan	Australian Open; Melbourne, Australia; Grand Slam; Hard – A$34,848,000; 128S/128Q/64D/32X; Singles – Doubles – Mixed	(Australia) Rinky Hijikata (Australia) Jason Kubler; 6–4, 7–6^{(7–4)}	(Monaco) Hugo Nys (Poland) Jan Zieliński	Karen Khachanov (United States) Tommy Paul	(United States) Sebastian Korda (Czech Republic) Jiří Lehečka; Andrey Rublev (United States) Ben Shelton
16 Jan; 23 Jan	Australian Open; Melbourne, Australia; Grand Slam; Hard – A$34,848,000; 128S/128Q/64D/32X; Singles – Doubles – Mixed	(Brazil) Luisa Stefani (Brazil) Rafael Matos; 7–6^{(7–2)}, 6–2	(India) Sania Mirza (India) Rohan Bopanna	Karen Khachanov (United States) Tommy Paul	(United States) Sebastian Korda (Czech Republic) Jiří Lehečka; Andrey Rublev (United States) Ben Shelton
30 Jan	Davis Cup qualifying round Rijeka, Croatia – hard (i); Tatabánya, Hungary – hard (i); Tashkent, Uzbekistan – hard (i); Trier, Germany – hard (i); Cota, Colombia – clay (i); Oslo, Norway – hard (i); La Serena, Chile – clay Seoul, South Korea – hard (i); Stockholm, Sweden – hard (i); Groningen, Netherlands – hard (i); Espoo, Finland – hard (i); Maia, Portugal – clay (i)	Qualifying round winners Croatia 3–1; France 3–2; United States 4–0; Switzerland 3–2; Great Britain 3–1; Serbia 4–0; Chile 3–1; South Korea 3–2; Sweden 3–1; Netherlands 4–0; Finland 3–1; Czech Republic 3–1	Qualifying round losers Austria; Hungary; Uzbekistan; Germany; Colombia; Norway; Kazakhstan; Belgium; Bosnia and Herzegovina; Slovakia; Argentina; Portugal		

=== February ===
Week	Tournament	Champions	Runners-up	Semifinalists	Quarterfinalists
6 Feb	Córdoba Open; Córdoba, Argentina; ATP 250; Clay (red) – $713,495 – 28S/16Q/16D; Singles – Doubles	(Argentina) Sebastián Báez; 6–1, 3–6, 6–3	(Argentina) Federico Coria	(Bolivia) Hugo Dellien (Spain) Albert Ramos Viñolas	(Argentina) Juan Manuel Cerúndolo (Chile) Tomás Barrios Vera (Portugal) João Sousa (Argentina) Francisco Cerúndolo
6 Feb	Córdoba Open; Córdoba, Argentina; ATP 250; Clay (red) – $713,495 – 28S/16Q/16D; Singles – Doubles	(Argentina) Máximo González (Argentina) Andrés Molteni; 6–4, 6–4	(France) Sadio Doumbia (France) Fabien Reboul	(Bolivia) Hugo Dellien (Spain) Albert Ramos Viñolas	(Argentina) Juan Manuel Cerúndolo (Chile) Tomás Barrios Vera (Portugal) João Sousa (Argentina) Francisco Cerúndolo
6 Feb	Open Sud de France; Montpellier, France; ATP 250; Hard (i) – €630,705 – 28S/16Q/16D; Singles – Doubles	(Italy) Jannik Sinner; 7–6^{(7–3)}, 6–3	(United States) Maxime Cressy	(Denmark) Holger Rune (France) Arthur Fils	(France) Grégoire Barrère (Croatia) Borna Ćorić (France) Quentin Halys (Italy) Lorenzo Sonego
6 Feb	Open Sud de France; Montpellier, France; ATP 250; Hard (i) – €630,705 – 28S/16Q/16D; Singles – Doubles	(Netherlands) Robin Haase (Netherlands) Matwé Middelkoop; 7–6^{(7–4)}, 4–6, [10–6]	(United States) Maxime Cressy (France) Albano Olivetti	(Denmark) Holger Rune (France) Arthur Fils	(France) Grégoire Barrère (Croatia) Borna Ćorić (France) Quentin Halys (Italy) Lorenzo Sonego
6 Feb	Dallas Open; Dallas, United States; ATP 250; Hard (i) – $822,175 – 28S/16Q/16D; Singles – Doubles	(China) Wu Yibing; 6–7^{(4–7)}, 7–6^{(7–3)}, 7–6^{(14–12)}	(United States) John Isner	(United States) Taylor Fritz (United States) J. J. Wolf	(United States) Marcos Giron (France) Adrian Mannarino (Ecuador) Emilio Gómez (United States) Frances Tiafoe
6 Feb	Dallas Open; Dallas, United States; ATP 250; Hard (i) – $822,175 – 28S/16Q/16D; Singles – Doubles	(United Kingdom) Jamie Murray (New Zealand) Michael Venus; 1–6, 7–6^{(7–4)}, [10–7]	(United States) Nathaniel Lammons (United States) Jackson Withrow	(United States) Taylor Fritz (United States) J. J. Wolf	(United States) Marcos Giron (France) Adrian Mannarino (Ecuador) Emilio Gómez (United States) Frances Tiafoe
13 Feb	Rotterdam Open; Rotterdam, Netherlands; ATP 500; Hard (i) – €2,224,460 – 32S/16Q/16D; Singles – Doubles	Daniil Medvedev; 5–7, 6–2, 6–2	(Italy) Jannik Sinner	(Netherlands) Tallon Griekspoor (Bulgaria) Grigor Dimitrov	(Switzerland) Stan Wawrinka (Netherlands) Gijs Brouwer (Canada) Félix Auger-Aliassime (Australia) Alex de Minaur
13 Feb	Rotterdam Open; Rotterdam, Netherlands; ATP 500; Hard (i) – €2,224,460 – 32S/16Q/16D; Singles – Doubles	(Croatia) Ivan Dodig (United States) Austin Krajicek; 7–6^{(7–5)}, 2–6, [12–10]	(India) Rohan Bopanna (Australia) Matthew Ebden	(Netherlands) Tallon Griekspoor (Bulgaria) Grigor Dimitrov	(Switzerland) Stan Wawrinka (Netherlands) Gijs Brouwer (Canada) Félix Auger-Aliassime (Australia) Alex de Minaur
13 Feb	Argentina Open; Buenos Aires, Argentina; ATP 250; Clay (red) – $711,600 – 28S/16Q/16D; Singles – Doubles	(Spain) Carlos Alcaraz; 6–3, 7–5	(United Kingdom) Cameron Norrie	(Spain) Bernabé Zapata Miralles (Peru) Juan Pablo Varillas	(Serbia) Dušan Lajović (Argentina) Francisco Cerúndolo (Italy) Lorenzo Musetti (Argentina) Tomás Martín Etcheverry
13 Feb	Argentina Open; Buenos Aires, Argentina; ATP 250; Clay (red) – $711,600 – 28S/16Q/16D; Singles – Doubles	(Italy) Simone Bolelli (Italy) Fabio Fognini; 6–2, 6–4	(Colombia) Nicolás Barrientos (Uruguay) Ariel Behar	(Spain) Bernabé Zapata Miralles (Peru) Juan Pablo Varillas	(Serbia) Dušan Lajović (Argentina) Francisco Cerúndolo (Italy) Lorenzo Musetti (Argentina) Tomás Martín Etcheverry
13 Feb	Delray Beach Open; Delray Beach, United States; ATP 250; Hard – $718,245 – 28S/16Q/16D; Singles – Doubles	(United States) Taylor Fritz; 6–0, 5–7, 6–2	(Serbia) Miomir Kecmanović	(United States) Mackenzie McDonald (Moldova) Radu Albot	(France) Adrian Mannarino (United States) Michael Mmoh (United States) Marcos Giron (United States) Tommy Paul
13 Feb	Delray Beach Open; Delray Beach, United States; ATP 250; Hard – $718,245 – 28S/16Q/16D; Singles – Doubles	(El Salvador) Marcelo Arévalo (Netherlands) Jean-Julien Rojer; 6–3, 6–4	(Australia) Rinky Hijikata (United States) Reese Stalder	(United States) Mackenzie McDonald (Moldova) Radu Albot	(France) Adrian Mannarino (United States) Michael Mmoh (United States) Marcos Giron (United States) Tommy Paul
20 Feb	Rio Open; Rio de Janeiro, Brazil; ATP 500; Clay (red) – $2,013,940 – 32S/16Q/16D; Singles – Doubles	(United Kingdom) Cameron Norrie; 5–7, 6–4, 7–5	(Spain) Carlos Alcaraz	(Chile) Nicolás Jarry (Spain) Bernabé Zapata Miralles	(Serbia) Dušan Lajović (Argentina) Sebastián Báez (Spain) Albert Ramos Viñolas (Bolivia) Hugo Dellien
20 Feb	Rio Open; Rio de Janeiro, Brazil; ATP 500; Clay (red) – $2,013,940 – 32S/16Q/16D; Singles – Doubles	(Argentina) Máximo González (Argentina) Andrés Molteni; 6–1, 7–6^{(7–3)}	(Colombia) Juan Sebastián Cabal (Brazil) Marcelo Melo	(Chile) Nicolás Jarry (Spain) Bernabé Zapata Miralles	(Serbia) Dušan Lajović (Argentina) Sebastián Báez (Spain) Albert Ramos Viñolas (Bolivia) Hugo Dellien
20 Feb	Open 13; Marseille, France; ATP 250; Hard (i) – €707,510 – 28S/16Q/16D; Singles – Doubles	(Poland) Hubert Hurkacz; 6–3, 7–6^{(7–4)}	(France) Benjamin Bonzi	(Kazakhstan) Alexander Bublik (France) Arthur Fils	(Sweden) Mikael Ymer (Bulgaria) Grigor Dimitrov (Australia) Alex de Minaur (Switzerland) Stan Wawrinka
20 Feb	Open 13; Marseille, France; ATP 250; Hard (i) – €707,510 – 28S/16Q/16D; Singles – Doubles	(Mexico) Santiago González (France) Édouard Roger-Vasselin; 4–6, 7–6^{(7–4)}, [10–7]	(France) Nicolas Mahut (France) Fabrice Martin	(Kazakhstan) Alexander Bublik (France) Arthur Fils	(Sweden) Mikael Ymer (Bulgaria) Grigor Dimitrov (Australia) Alex de Minaur (Switzerland) Stan Wawrinka
20 Feb	Qatar Open; Doha, Qatar; ATP 250; Hard – $1,377,025 – 28S/16Q/16D; Singles – Doubles	Todd Daren; 6–4, 6–4	(United Kingdom) Roman Safiullin	(Czech Republic) Jiří Lehečka (Canada) Félix Auger-Aliassime	Andrey Rublev (France) Alexandre Müller (Australia) Christopher O'Connell (Spain) Alejandro Davidovich Fokina
20 Feb	Qatar Open; Doha, Qatar; ATP 250; Hard – $1,377,025 – 28S/16Q/16D; Singles – Doubles	(India) Rohan Bopanna (Australia) Matthew Ebden; 6–7^{(5–7)}, 6–4, [10–6]	(France) Constant Lestienne (Netherlands) Botic van de Zandschulp	(Czech Republic) Jiří Lehečka (Canada) Félix Auger-Aliassime	Andrey Rublev (France) Alexandre Müller (Australia) Christopher O'Connell (Spain) Alejandro Davidovich Fokina
27 Feb	Mexican Open; Acapulco, Mexico; ATP 500; Hard – $2,013,940 – 32S/16Q/16D; Singles – Doubles	(Australia) Alex de Minaur; 3–6, 6–4, 6–1	(United States) Tommy Paul	(United States) Taylor Fritz (Denmark) Holger Rune	(United States) Mackenzie McDonald (United States) Frances Tiafoe (Italy) Matteo Berrettini (Japan) Taro Daniel
27 Feb	Mexican Open; Acapulco, Mexico; ATP 500; Hard – $2,013,940 – 32S/16Q/16D; Singles – Doubles	(Austria) Alexander Erler (Austria) Lucas Miedler; 7–6^{(11–9)}, 7–6^{(7–3)}	(United States) Nathaniel Lammons (United States) Jackson Withrow	(United States) Taylor Fritz (Denmark) Holger Rune	(United States) Mackenzie McDonald (United States) Frances Tiafoe (Italy) Matteo Berrettini (Japan) Taro Daniel
27 Feb	Dubai Tennis Championships; Dubai, United Arab Emirates; ATP 500; Hard – $2,855,495 – 32S/16Q/16D; Singles – Doubles	Daniil Medvedev; 6–2, 6–2	Andrey Rublev	(Serbia) Novak Djokovic (Germany) Alexander Zverev	(Poland) Hubert Hurkacz (Croatia) Borna Ćorić (Italy) Lorenzo Sonego (Netherlands) Botic van de Zandschulp
27 Feb	Dubai Tennis Championships; Dubai, United Arab Emirates; ATP 500; Hard – $2,855,495 – 32S/16Q/16D; Singles – Doubles	(United States) Maxime Cressy (France) Fabrice Martin; 7–6^{(7–2)}, 6–4	(United Kingdom) Lloyd Glasspool (Finland) Harri Heliövaara	(Serbia) Novak Djokovic (Germany) Alexander Zverev	(Poland) Hubert Hurkacz (Croatia) Borna Ćorić (Italy) Lorenzo Sonego (Netherlands) Botic van de Zandschulp
27 Feb	Chile Open; Santiago, Chile; ATP 250; Clay (red) – $642,735 – 28S/16Q/16D; Singles – Doubles	(Chile) Nicolás Jarry; 6–7^{(5–7)}, 7–6^{(7–5)}, 6–2	(Argentina) Tomás Martín Etcheverry	(Spain) Jaume Munar (Argentina) Sebastián Báez	(Brazil) Thiago Monteiro (Germany) Yannick Hanfmann (Serbia) Laslo Djere (Serbia) Dušan Lajović
27 Feb	Chile Open; Santiago, Chile; ATP 250; Clay (red) – $642,735 – 28S/16Q/16D; Singles – Doubles	(Italy) Andrea Pellegrino (Italy) Andrea Vavassori; 6–4, 3–6, [12–10]	(Brazil) Thiago Seyboth Wild (Chile) Matías Soto	(Spain) Jaume Munar (Argentina) Sebastián Báez	(Brazil) Thiago Monteiro (Germany) Yannick Hanfmann (Serbia) Laslo Djere (Serbia) Dušan Lajović

=== March ===
Week	Tournament	Champions	Runners-up	Semifinalists	Quarterfinalists
6 Mar; 13 Mar	Indian Wells Open; Indian Wells, United States; ATP Masters 1000; Hard – $8,800,000 – 96S/48Q/32D; Singles – Doubles	(Spain) Carlos Alcaraz; 6–3, 6–2	Daniil Medvedev	(Italy) Jannik Sinner (United States) Frances Tiafoe	(Canada) Félix Auger-Aliassime (United States) Taylor Fritz (Spain) Alejandro Davidovich Fokina (United Kingdom) Cameron Norrie
6 Mar; 13 Mar	Indian Wells Open; Indian Wells, United States; ATP Masters 1000; Hard – $8,800,000 – 96S/48Q/32D; Singles – Doubles	(India) Rohan Bopanna (Australia) Matthew Ebden; 6–3, 2–6, [10–8]	(Netherlands) Wesley Koolhof (United Kingdom) Neal Skupski	(Italy) Jannik Sinner (United States) Frances Tiafoe	(Canada) Félix Auger-Aliassime (United States) Taylor Fritz (Spain) Alejandro Davidovich Fokina (United Kingdom) Cameron Norrie
20 Mar; 27 Mar	Miami Open; Miami Gardens, United States; ATP Masters 1000; Hard – $8,800,000 – 96S/48Q/32D; Singles – Doubles	Daniil Medvedev; 7–5, 6–3	(Italy) Jannik Sinner	Karen Khachanov (Spain) Carlos Alcaraz	(United States) Taylor Fritz (Finland) Emil Ruusuvuori (United States) Christopher Eubanks (Argentina) Francisco Cerúndolo
20 Mar; 27 Mar	Miami Open; Miami Gardens, United States; ATP Masters 1000; Hard – $8,800,000 – 96S/48Q/32D; Singles – Doubles	(Mexico) Santiago González (France) Édouard Roger-Vasselin; 7–6^{(7–4)}, 7–5	(United States) Austin Krajicek (France) Nicolas Mahut	Karen Khachanov (Spain) Carlos Alcaraz	(United States) Taylor Fritz (Finland) Emil Ruusuvuori (United States) Christopher Eubanks (Argentina) Francisco Cerúndolo

=== April ===
Week	Tournament	Champions	Runners-up	Semifinalists	Quarterfinalists
3 Apr	U.S. Men's Clay Court Championships; Houston, United States; ATP 250; Clay (maroon) – $642,735 – 28S/16Q/16D; Singles – Doubles	(United States) Frances Tiafoe; 7–6^{(7–1)}, 7–6^{(8–6)}	(Argentina) Tomás Martín Etcheverry	(Netherlands) Gijs Brouwer (Germany) Yannick Hanfmann	(Australia) Jason Kubler (United States) J. J. Wolf (Chile) Cristian Garín (Czech Republic) Tomáš Macháč
3 Apr	U.S. Men's Clay Court Championships; Houston, United States; ATP 250; Clay (maroon) – $642,735 – 28S/16Q/16D; Singles – Doubles	(Australia) Max Purcell (Australia) Jordan Thompson; 4–6, 6–4, [10–5]	(United Kingdom) Julian Cash (United Kingdom) Henry Patten	(Netherlands) Gijs Brouwer (Germany) Yannick Hanfmann	(Australia) Jason Kubler (United States) J. J. Wolf (Chile) Cristian Garín (Czech Republic) Tomáš Macháč
3 Apr	Grand Prix Hassan II; Marrakesh, Morocco; ATP 250; Clay (red) – €562,815 – 28S/16Q/16D; Singles – Doubles	(Spain) Roberto Carballés Baena; 4–6, 7–6^{(7–3)}, 6–2	(France) Alexandre Müller	Pavel Kotov (United Kingdom) Dan Evans	(Italy) Lorenzo Musetti (Australia) Christopher O'Connell (Netherlands) Tallon Griekspoor (Italy) Andrea Vavassori
3 Apr	Grand Prix Hassan II; Marrakesh, Morocco; ATP 250; Clay (red) – €562,815 – 28S/16Q/16D; Singles – Doubles	(Brazil) Marcelo Demoliner (Italy) Andrea Vavassori; 6–4, 3–6, [12–10]	(Austria) Alexander Erler (Austria) Lucas Miedler	Pavel Kotov (United Kingdom) Dan Evans	(Italy) Lorenzo Musetti (Australia) Christopher O'Connell (Netherlands) Tallon Griekspoor (Italy) Andrea Vavassori
3 Apr	Estoril Open; Cascais, Portugal; ATP 250; Clay (red) – €562,815 – 28S/16Q/16D; Singles – Doubles	(Norway) Casper Ruud; 6–2, 7–6^{(7–3)}	(Serbia) Miomir Kecmanović	(France) Quentin Halys (Italy) Marco Cecchinato	(Argentina) Sebastián Báez (Austria) Dominic Thiem (Spain) Alejandro Davidovich Fokina (Spain) Bernabé Zapata Miralles
3 Apr	Estoril Open; Cascais, Portugal; ATP 250; Clay (red) – €562,815 – 28S/16Q/16D; Singles – Doubles	(Belgium) Sander Gillé (Belgium) Joran Vliegen; 6–3, 6–4	(Serbia) Nikola Ćaćić (Serbia) Miomir Kecmanović	(France) Quentin Halys (Italy) Marco Cecchinato	(Argentina) Sebastián Báez (Austria) Dominic Thiem (Spain) Alejandro Davidovich Fokina (Spain) Bernabé Zapata Miralles
10 Apr	Monte-Carlo Masters; Roquebrune-Cap-Martin, France; ATP Masters 1000; Clay (red) – €5,779,335 – 56S/28Q/28D; Singles – Doubles	Andrey Rublev; 5–7, 6–2, 7–5	(Denmark) Holger Rune	(Italy) Jannik Sinner (United States) Taylor Fritz	(Italy) Lorenzo Musetti; Daniil Medvedev (Germany) Jan-Lennard Struff (Greece) Stefanos Tsitsipas
10 Apr	Monte-Carlo Masters; Roquebrune-Cap-Martin, France; ATP Masters 1000; Clay (red) – €5,779,335 – 56S/28Q/28D; Singles – Doubles	(Croatia) Ivan Dodig (United States) Austin Krajicek; 6–0, 4–6, [14–12]	(Monaco) Romain Arneodo (Austria) Sam Weissborn	(Italy) Jannik Sinner (United States) Taylor Fritz	(Italy) Lorenzo Musetti; Daniil Medvedev (Germany) Jan-Lennard Struff (Greece) Stefanos Tsitsipas
17 Apr	Barcelona Open; Barcelona, Spain; ATP 500; Clay (red) – €2,722,480 – 48S/24Q/16D; Singles – Doubles	(Spain) Carlos Alcaraz; 6–3, 6–4	(Greece) Stefanos Tsitsipas	(United Kingdom) Dan Evans (Italy) Lorenzo Musetti	(Spain) Alejandro Davidovich Fokina (Argentina) Francisco Cerúndolo (Italy) Jannik Sinner (Australia) Alex de Minaur
17 Apr	Barcelona Open; Barcelona, Spain; ATP 500; Clay (red) – €2,722,480 – 48S/24Q/16D; Singles – Doubles	(Argentina) Máximo González (Argentina) Andrés Molteni; 6–3, 6–7^{(8–10)}, [10–4]	(Netherlands) Wesley Koolhof (United Kingdom) Neal Skupski	(United Kingdom) Dan Evans (Italy) Lorenzo Musetti	(Spain) Alejandro Davidovich Fokina (Argentina) Francisco Cerúndolo (Italy) Jannik Sinner (Australia) Alex de Minaur
17 Apr	Bavarian International Tennis; Championships; Munich, Germany; ATP 250; Clay (red) – €562,815 – 28S/16Q/16D; Singles – Doubles	(Denmark) Holger Rune; 6–4, 1–6, 7–6^{(7–3)}	(Netherlands) Botic van de Zandschulp	(Australia) Christopher O'Connell (United States) Taylor Fritz	(Chile) Cristian Garín (Italy) Flavio Cobolli (United States) Marcos Giron (Austria) Dominic Thiem
17 Apr	Bavarian International Tennis; Championships; Munich, Germany; ATP 250; Clay (red) – €562,815 – 28S/16Q/16D; Singles – Doubles	(Austria) Alexander Erler (Austria) Lucas Miedler; 6–3, 6–4	(Germany) Kevin Krawietz (Germany) Tim Pütz	(Australia) Christopher O'Connell (United States) Taylor Fritz	(Chile) Cristian Garín (Italy) Flavio Cobolli (United States) Marcos Giron (Austria) Dominic Thiem
17 Apr	Srpska Open; Banja Luka, Bosnia and Herzegovina; ATP 250; Clay (red) – €562,815 – 28S/16Q/16D; Singles – Doubles	(Serbia) Dušan Lajović; 6–3, 4–6, 6–4	Andrey Rublev	(Serbia) Miomir Kecmanović (Slovakia) Alex Molčan	(Serbia) Novak Djokovic (Czech Republic) Jiří Lehečka (Serbia) Laslo Djere (Bosnia and Herzegovina) Damir Džumhur
17 Apr	Srpska Open; Banja Luka, Bosnia and Herzegovina; ATP 250; Clay (red) – €562,815 – 28S/16Q/16D; Singles – Doubles	(United Kingdom) Jamie Murray (New Zealand) Michael Venus; 7–5, 6–2	(Portugal) Francisco Cabral (Kazakhstan) Aleksandr Nedovyesov	(Serbia) Miomir Kecmanović (Slovakia) Alex Molčan	(Serbia) Novak Djokovic (Czech Republic) Jiří Lehečka (Serbia) Laslo Djere (Bosnia and Herzegovina) Damir Džumhur
24 Apr; 1 May	Madrid Open; Madrid, Spain; ATP Masters 1000; Clay (red) – €7,705,780 – 96S/48Q/32D; Singles – Doubles	(Spain) Carlos Alcaraz; 6–4, 3–6, 6–3	(Germany) Jan-Lennard Struff	(Croatia) Borna Ćorić; Aslan Karatsev	Karen Khachanov (Germany) Daniel Altmaier (Greece) Stefanos Tsitsipas (China) Zhang Zhizhen
24 Apr; 1 May	Madrid Open; Madrid, Spain; ATP Masters 1000; Clay (red) – €7,705,780 – 96S/48Q/32D; Singles – Doubles	Karen Khachanov; Andrey Rublev; 6–3, 3–6, [10–3]	(India) Rohan Bopanna (Australia) Matthew Ebden	(Croatia) Borna Ćorić; Aslan Karatsev	Karen Khachanov (Germany) Daniel Altmaier (Greece) Stefanos Tsitsipas (China) Zhang Zhizhen

=== May ===
Week	Tournament	Champions	Runners-up	Semifinalists	Quarterfinalists
8 May; 15 May	Italian Open; Rome, Italy; ATP Masters 1000; Clay (red) – €7,705,780 – 96S/48Q/32D; Singles – Doubles	Daniil Medvedev; 7–5, 7–5	(Denmark) Holger Rune	(Norway) Casper Ruud (Greece) Stefanos Tsitsipas	(Serbia) Novak Djokovic (Argentina) Francisco Cerúndolo (Germany) Yannick Hanfmann (Croatia) Borna Ćorić
8 May; 15 May	Italian Open; Rome, Italy; ATP Masters 1000; Clay (red) – €7,705,780 – 96S/48Q/32D; Singles – Doubles	(Monaco) Hugo Nys (Poland) Jan Zieliński; 7–5, 6–1	(Netherlands) Robin Haase (Netherlands) Botic van de Zandschulp	(Norway) Casper Ruud (Greece) Stefanos Tsitsipas	(Serbia) Novak Djokovic (Argentina) Francisco Cerúndolo (Germany) Yannick Hanfmann (Croatia) Borna Ćorić
22 May	Geneva Open; Geneva, Switzerland; ATP 250; Clay (red) – €562,815 – 28S/16Q/16D; Singles – Doubles	(Chile) Nicolás Jarry; 7–6^{(7–1)}, 6–1	(Bulgaria) Grigor Dimitrov	(Germany) Alexander Zverev (United States) Taylor Fritz	(Norway) Casper Ruud (China) Wu Yibing (Australia) Christopher O'Connell; Ilya Ivashka
22 May	Geneva Open; Geneva, Switzerland; ATP 250; Clay (red) – €562,815 – 28S/16Q/16D; Singles – Doubles	(United Kingdom) Jamie Murray (New Zealand) Michael Venus; 7–6^{(8–6)}, 7–6^{(7–3)}	(Spain) Marcel Granollers (Argentina) Horacio Zeballos	(Germany) Alexander Zverev (United States) Taylor Fritz	(Norway) Casper Ruud (China) Wu Yibing (Australia) Christopher O'Connell; Ilya Ivashka
22 May	Lyon Open; Lyon, France; ATP 250; Clay (red) – €562,815 – 28S/16Q/16D; Singles – Doubles	(France) Arthur Fils; 6–3, 7–5	(Argentina) Francisco Cerúndolo	(United States) Brandon Nakashima (United Kingdom) Cameron Norrie	(Canada) Félix Auger-Aliassime (United States) Tommy Paul (United Kingdom) Jack Draper (Argentina) Sebastián Báez
22 May	Lyon Open; Lyon, France; ATP 250; Clay (red) – €562,815 – 28S/16Q/16D; Singles – Doubles	(United States) Rajeev Ram (United Kingdom) Joe Salisbury; 6–0, 6–3	(France) Nicolas Mahut (Netherlands) Matwé Middelkoop	(United States) Brandon Nakashima (United Kingdom) Cameron Norrie	(Canada) Félix Auger-Aliassime (United States) Tommy Paul (United Kingdom) Jack Draper (Argentina) Sebastián Báez
29 May; 5 Jun	French Open; Paris, France; Grand Slam; Clay (red) – €23,115,000; 128S/128Q/64D/32X; Singles – Doubles – Mixed	(Serbia) Novak Djokovic; 7–6^{(7–1)}, 6–3, 7–5	(Norway) Casper Ruud	(Spain) Carlos Alcaraz (Germany) Alexander Zverev	(Greece) Stefanos Tsitsipas; Karen Khachanov (Denmark) Holger Rune (Argentina) Tomás Martín Etcheverry
29 May; 5 Jun	French Open; Paris, France; Grand Slam; Clay (red) – €23,115,000; 128S/128Q/64D/32X; Singles – Doubles – Mixed	(Croatia) Ivan Dodig (United States) Austin Krajicek; 6–3, 6–1	(Belgium) Sander Gillé (Belgium) Joran Vliegen	(Spain) Carlos Alcaraz (Germany) Alexander Zverev	(Greece) Stefanos Tsitsipas; Karen Khachanov (Denmark) Holger Rune (Argentina) Tomás Martín Etcheverry
29 May; 5 Jun	French Open; Paris, France; Grand Slam; Clay (red) – €23,115,000; 128S/128Q/64D/32X; Singles – Doubles – Mixed	(Japan) Miyu Kato (Germany) Tim Pütz; 4–6, 6–4, [10–6]	(Canada) Bianca Andreescu (New Zealand) Michael Venus	(Spain) Carlos Alcaraz (Germany) Alexander Zverev	(Greece) Stefanos Tsitsipas; Karen Khachanov (Denmark) Holger Rune (Argentina) Tomás Martín Etcheverry

=== June ===
Week	Tournament	Champions	Runners-up	Semifinalists	Quarterfinalists
12 Jun	Stuttgart Open; Stuttgart, Germany; ATP 250; Grass – €718,410 – 28S/16Q/16D; Singles – Doubles	(United States) Frances Tiafoe; 4–6, 7–6^{(7–1)}, 7–6^{(10–8)}	(Germany) Jan-Lennard Struff	(Poland) Hubert Hurkacz (Hungary) Márton Fucsovics	(France) Richard Gasquet (Australia) Christopher O'Connell (Italy) Lorenzo Musetti (United States) Taylor Fritz
12 Jun	Stuttgart Open; Stuttgart, Germany; ATP 250; Grass – €718,410 – 28S/16Q/16D; Singles – Doubles	(Croatia) Nikola Mektić (Croatia) Mate Pavić; 7–6^{(7–2)}, 6–3	(Germany) Kevin Krawietz (Germany) Tim Pütz	(Poland) Hubert Hurkacz (Hungary) Márton Fucsovics	(France) Richard Gasquet (Australia) Christopher O'Connell (Italy) Lorenzo Musetti (United States) Taylor Fritz
12 Jun	Rosmalen Grass Court Championships 's-Hertogenbosch, Netherlands; ATP 250; Grass – €673,630 – 28S/16Q/16D; Singles – Doubles	(Netherlands) Tallon Griekspoor; 6–7^{(4–7)}, 7–6^{(7–3)}, 6–3	(Australia) Jordan Thompson	(Australia) Rinky Hijikata (Finland) Emil Ruusuvuori	(France) Adrian Mannarino (United States) Mackenzie McDonald (Australia) Alex de Minaur (Italy) Jannik Sinner
12 Jun	Rosmalen Grass Court Championships 's-Hertogenbosch, Netherlands; ATP 250; Grass – €673,630 – 28S/16Q/16D; Singles – Doubles	(Netherlands) Wesley Koolhof (United Kingdom) Neal Skupski; 7–6^{(7–1)}, 6–2	(Ecuador) Gonzalo Escobar (Kazakhstan) Aleksandr Nedovyesov	(Australia) Rinky Hijikata (Finland) Emil Ruusuvuori	(France) Adrian Mannarino (United States) Mackenzie McDonald (Australia) Alex de Minaur (Italy) Jannik Sinner
19 Jun	Halle Open; Halle, Germany; ATP 500; Grass – €2,195,175 – 32S/16Q/16D; Singles – Doubles	(Kazakhstan) Alexander Bublik; 6–3, 3–6, 6–3	Andrey Rublev	(Spain) Roberto Bautista Agut (Germany) Alexander Zverev	Daniil Medvedev (Netherlands) Tallon Griekspoor (Italy) Jannik Sinner (Chile) Nicolás Jarry
19 Jun	Halle Open; Halle, Germany; ATP 500; Grass – €2,195,175 – 32S/16Q/16D; Singles – Doubles	(Brazil) Marcelo Melo (Australia) John Peers; 7–6^{(7–3)}, 3–6, [10–6]	(Italy) Simone Bolelli (Italy) Andrea Vavassori	(Spain) Roberto Bautista Agut (Germany) Alexander Zverev	Daniil Medvedev (Netherlands) Tallon Griekspoor (Italy) Jannik Sinner (Chile) Nicolás Jarry
19 Jun	Queen's Club Championships; London, United Kingdom; ATP 500; Grass – €2,195,175 – 32S/16Q/16D; Singles – Doubles	(Spain) Carlos Alcaraz; 6–4, 6–4	(Australia) Alex de Minaur	(United States) Sebastian Korda (Denmark) Holger Rune	(Bulgaria) Grigor Dimitrov (United Kingdom) Cameron Norrie (France) Adrian Mannarino (Italy) Lorenzo Musetti
19 Jun	Queen's Club Championships; London, United Kingdom; ATP 500; Grass – €2,195,175 – 32S/16Q/16D; Singles – Doubles	(Croatia) Ivan Dodig (United States) Austin Krajicek; 6–4, 6–7^{(5–7)}, [10–3]	(United States) Taylor Fritz (Czech Republic) Jiří Lehečka	(United States) Sebastian Korda (Denmark) Holger Rune	(Bulgaria) Grigor Dimitrov (United Kingdom) Cameron Norrie (France) Adrian Mannarino (Italy) Lorenzo Musetti
26 Jun	Mallorca Championships; Santa Ponsa, Spain; ATP 250; Grass – €915,630 – 28S/16Q/16D; Singles – Doubles	(United States) Christopher Eubanks; 6–1, 6–4	(France) Adrian Mannarino	(Germany) Yannick Hanfmann (South Africa) Lloyd Harris	(Spain) Feliciano López (France) Corentin Moutet (France) Arthur Rinderknech; Pavel Kotov
26 Jun	Mallorca Championships; Santa Ponsa, Spain; ATP 250; Grass – €915,630 – 28S/16Q/16D; Singles – Doubles	(India) Yuki Bhambri (South Africa) Lloyd Harris; 6–3, 6–4	(Netherlands) Robin Haase (Austria) Philipp Oswald	(Germany) Yannick Hanfmann (South Africa) Lloyd Harris	(Spain) Feliciano López (France) Corentin Moutet (France) Arthur Rinderknech; Pavel Kotov
26 Jun	Eastbourne International; Eastbourne, United Kingdom; ATP 250; Grass – €723,655 – 28S/16Q/16D; Singles – Doubles	(Argentina) Francisco Cerúndolo; 6–4, 1–6, 6–4	(United States) Tommy Paul	(United States) Mackenzie McDonald (France) Grégoire Barrère	(Sweden) Mikael Ymer (China) Zhang Zhizhen (Serbia) Miomir Kecmanović (United States) J. J. Wolf
26 Jun	Eastbourne International; Eastbourne, United Kingdom; ATP 250; Grass – €723,655 – 28S/16Q/16D; Singles – Doubles	(Croatia) Nikola Mektić (Croatia) Mate Pavić; 6–4, 6–2	(Croatia) Ivan Dodig (United States) Austin Krajicek	(United States) Mackenzie McDonald (France) Grégoire Barrère	(Sweden) Mikael Ymer (China) Zhang Zhizhen (Serbia) Miomir Kecmanović (United States) J. J. Wolf

=== July ===
Week	Tournament	Champions	Runners-up	Semifinalists	Quarterfinalists
3 Jul; 10 Jul	Wimbledon; London, United Kingdom; Grand Slam; Grass – £20,747,000; 128S/128Q/64D/32X; Singles – Doubles – Mixed	(Spain) Carlos Alcaraz; 1–6, 7–6^{(8–6)}, 6–1, 3–6, 6–4	(Serbia) Novak Djokovic	Daniil Medvedev (Italy) Jannik Sinner	(Denmark) Holger Rune (United States) Christopher Eubanks; Roman Safiullin; Andrey Rublev
3 Jul; 10 Jul	Wimbledon; London, United Kingdom; Grand Slam; Grass – £20,747,000; 128S/128Q/64D/32X; Singles – Doubles – Mixed	(Netherlands) Wesley Koolhof (United Kingdom) Neal Skupski; 6–4, 6–4	(Spain) Marcel Granollers (Argentina) Horacio Zeballos	Daniil Medvedev (Italy) Jannik Sinner	(Denmark) Holger Rune (United States) Christopher Eubanks; Roman Safiullin; Andrey Rublev
3 Jul; 10 Jul	Wimbledon; London, United Kingdom; Grand Slam; Grass – £20,747,000; 128S/128Q/64D/32X; Singles – Doubles – Mixed	(Croatia) Mate Pavić (Ukraine) Lyudmyla Kichenok; 6–4, 6–7^{(9–11)}, 6–3	(Belgium) Joran Vliegen (China) Xu Yifan	Daniil Medvedev (Italy) Jannik Sinner	(Denmark) Holger Rune (United States) Christopher Eubanks; Roman Safiullin; Andrey Rublev
17 Jul	Hopman Cup; Nice, France; ITF Mixed Teams Championships; Clay (red) – 6 teams (RR)	Croatia; 2–0	Switzerland	Round robin (Group 1) Denmark; France	Round robin (Group 2) Belgium; Spain
17 Jul	Hall of Fame Open; Newport, United States; ATP 250; Grass – $642,735 – 28S/16Q/16D; Singles – Doubles	(France) Adrian Mannarino; 6–2, 6–4	(United States) Alex Michelsen	(United States) John Isner (France) Ugo Humbert	(United States) Tommy Paul (United States) Mackenzie McDonald (South Africa) Kevin Anderson (Australia) Jordan Thompson
17 Jul	Hall of Fame Open; Newport, United States; ATP 250; Grass – $642,735 – 28S/16Q/16D; Singles – Doubles	(United States) Nathaniel Lammons (United States) Jackson Withrow; 6–3, 5–7, [10–5]	(United States) William Blumberg (Australia) Max Purcell	(United States) John Isner (France) Ugo Humbert	(United States) Tommy Paul (United States) Mackenzie McDonald (South Africa) Kevin Anderson (Australia) Jordan Thompson
17 Jul	Swedish Open; Båstad, Sweden; ATP 250; Clay (red) – €562,815 – 28S/16Q/16D; Singles – Doubles	Andrey Rublev; 7–6^{(7–3)}, 6–0	(Norway) Casper Ruud	(Italy) Lorenzo Musetti (Argentina) Francisco Cerúndolo	(Austria) Sebastian Ofner (Austria) Filip Misolic (Argentina) Federico Coria (Germany) Alexander Zverev
17 Jul	Swedish Open; Båstad, Sweden; ATP 250; Clay (red) – €562,815 – 28S/16Q/16D; Singles – Doubles	(Ecuador) Gonzalo Escobar (Kazakhstan) Aleksandr Nedovyesov; 6–2, 6–2	(Portugal) Francisco Cabral (Brazil) Rafael Matos	(Italy) Lorenzo Musetti (Argentina) Francisco Cerúndolo	(Austria) Sebastian Ofner (Austria) Filip Misolic (Argentina) Federico Coria (Germany) Alexander Zverev
17 Jul	Swiss Open; Gstaad, Switzerland; ATP 250; Clay (red) – €562,815 – 28S/16Q/16D; Singles – Doubles	(Argentina) Pedro Cachin; 3–6, 6–0, 7–5	(Spain) Albert Ramos Viñolas	(Serbia) Hamad Medjedovic (Serbia) Miomir Kecmanović	(Spain) Jaume Munar (Germany) Yannick Hanfmann (Peru) Juan Pablo Varillas (Belgium) Zizou Bergs
17 Jul	Swiss Open; Gstaad, Switzerland; ATP 250; Clay (red) – €562,815 – 28S/16Q/16D; Singles – Doubles	(Switzerland) Dominic Stricker (Switzerland) Stan Wawrinka; 7–6^{(10–8)}, 6–2	(Brazil) Marcelo Demoliner (Netherlands) Matwé Middelkoop	(Serbia) Hamad Medjedovic (Serbia) Miomir Kecmanović	(Spain) Jaume Munar (Germany) Yannick Hanfmann (Peru) Juan Pablo Varillas (Belgium) Zizou Bergs
24 Jul	Hamburg Open; Hamburg, Germany; ATP 500; Clay (red) – €1,831,515 – 32S/16Q/16D; Singles – Doubles	(Germany) Alexander Zverev; 7–5, 6–3	(Serbia) Laslo Djere	(France) Arthur Fils (China) Zhang Zhizhen	(Norway) Casper Ruud (France) Luca Van Assche (Italy) Lorenzo Musetti (Germany) Daniel Altmaier
24 Jul	Hamburg Open; Hamburg, Germany; ATP 500; Clay (red) – €1,831,515 – 32S/16Q/16D; Singles – Doubles	(Germany) Kevin Krawietz (Germany) Tim Pütz; 7–6^{(7–4)}, 6–3	(Belgium) Sander Gillé (Belgium) Joran Vliegen	(France) Arthur Fils (China) Zhang Zhizhen	(Norway) Casper Ruud (France) Luca Van Assche (Italy) Lorenzo Musetti (Germany) Daniel Altmaier
24 Jul	Atlanta Open; Atlanta, United States; ATP 250; Hard – $737,170 – 28S/16Q/16D; Singles – Doubles	(United States) Taylor Fritz; 7–5, 6–7^{(5–7)}, 6–4	(Australia) Aleksandar Vukic	(United States) J. J. Wolf (France) Ugo Humbert	(Japan) Kei Nishikori (Germany) Dominik Koepfer (United States) Christopher Eubanks (Australia) Alex de Minaur
24 Jul	Atlanta Open; Atlanta, United States; ATP 250; Hard – $737,170 – 28S/16Q/16D; Singles – Doubles	(United States) Nathaniel Lammons (United States) Jackson Withrow; 7–6^{(7–3)}, 7–6^{(7–4)}	(Australia) Max Purcell (Australia) Jordan Thompson	(United States) J. J. Wolf (France) Ugo Humbert	(Japan) Kei Nishikori (Germany) Dominik Koepfer (United States) Christopher Eubanks (Australia) Alex de Minaur
24 Jul	Croatia Open; Umag, Croatia; ATP 250; Clay (red) – €562,815 – 28S/16Q/16D; Singles – Doubles	(Australia) Alexei Popyrin; 6–7^{(5–7)}, 6–3, 6–4	(Switzerland) Stan Wawrinka	(Italy) Matteo Arnaldi (Italy) Lorenzo Sonego	(Czech Republic) Jiří Lehečka (Croatia) Dino Prižmić (Spain) Roberto Carballés Baena (Spain) Jaume Munar
24 Jul	Croatia Open; Umag, Croatia; ATP 250; Clay (red) – €562,815 – 28S/16Q/16D; Singles – Doubles	(Slovenia) Blaž Rola (Croatia) Nino Serdarušić; 4–6, 7–6^{(7–2)}, [15–13]	(Italy) Simone Bolelli (Italy) Andrea Vavassori	(Italy) Matteo Arnaldi (Italy) Lorenzo Sonego	(Czech Republic) Jiří Lehečka (Croatia) Dino Prižmić (Spain) Roberto Carballés Baena (Spain) Jaume Munar
31 Jul	Washington Open; Washington, D.C., United States; ATP 500; Hard – $2,013,940 – 48S/24Q/16D; Singles – Doubles	(United Kingdom) Dan Evans; 7–5, 6–3	(Netherlands) Tallon Griekspoor	(United States) Taylor Fritz (Bulgaria) Grigor Dimitrov	(Australia) Jordan Thompson (United States) J. J. Wolf (France) Ugo Humbert (United States) Frances Tiafoe
31 Jul	Washington Open; Washington, D.C., United States; ATP 500; Hard – $2,013,940 – 48S/24Q/16D; Singles – Doubles	(Argentina) Máximo González (Argentina) Andrés Molteni; 6–7^{(4–7)}, 6–2, [10–6]	(United States) Mackenzie McDonald (United States) Ben Shelton	(United States) Taylor Fritz (Bulgaria) Grigor Dimitrov	(Australia) Jordan Thompson (United States) J. J. Wolf (France) Ugo Humbert (United States) Frances Tiafoe
31 Jul	Los Cabos Open; Los Cabos, Mexico; ATP 250; Hard – $852,480 – 28S/16Q/16D; Singles – Doubles	(Greece) Stefanos Tsitsipas; 6–3, 6–4	(Australia) Alex de Minaur	(Croatia) Borna Ćorić (Germany) Dominik Koepfer	(Chile) Nicolás Jarry; Ilya Ivashka (United States) Tommy Paul (United States) Aleksandar Kovacevic
31 Jul	Los Cabos Open; Los Cabos, Mexico; ATP 250; Hard – $852,480 – 28S/16Q/16D; Singles – Doubles	(Mexico) Santiago González (France) Édouard Roger-Vasselin; 6–4, 7–5	(Australia) Andrew Harris (Germany) Dominik Koepfer	(Croatia) Borna Ćorić (Germany) Dominik Koepfer	(Chile) Nicolás Jarry; Ilya Ivashka (United States) Tommy Paul (United States) Aleksandar Kovacevic
31 Jul	Austrian Open; Kitzbühel, Austria; ATP 250; Clay (red) – €562,815 – 28S/16Q/16D; Singles – Doubles	(Argentina) Sebastián Báez; 6–3, 6–1	(Austria) Dominic Thiem	(Argentina) Tomás Martín Etcheverry (Serbia) Laslo Djere	(Colombia) Daniel Elahi Galán (Slovakia) Alex Molčan (Argentina) Pedro Cachin (France) Arthur Rinderknech
31 Jul	Austrian Open; Kitzbühel, Austria; ATP 250; Clay (red) – €562,815 – 28S/16Q/16D; Singles – Doubles	(Austria) Alexander Erler (Austria) Lucas Miedler; 6–4, 6–4	(Ecuador) Gonzalo Escobar (Kazakhstan) Aleksandr Nedovyesov	(Argentina) Tomás Martín Etcheverry (Serbia) Laslo Djere	(Colombia) Daniel Elahi Galán (Slovakia) Alex Molčan (Argentina) Pedro Cachin (France) Arthur Rinderknech

=== August ===
Week	Tournament	Champions	Runners-up	Semifinalists	Quarterfinalists
7 Aug	Canadian Open; Toronto, Canada; ATP Masters 1000; Hard – $6,600,000 – 56S/28Q/28D; Singles – Doubles	(Italy) Jannik Sinner; 6–4, 6–1	(Australia) Alex de Minaur	(United States) Tommy Paul (Spain) Alejandro Davidovich Fokina	(Spain) Carlos Alcaraz (France) Gaël Monfils (United States) Mackenzie McDonald; Daniil Medvedev
7 Aug	Canadian Open; Toronto, Canada; ATP Masters 1000; Hard – $6,600,000 – 56S/28Q/28D; Singles – Doubles	(El Salvador) Marcelo Arévalo (Netherlands) Jean-Julien Rojer; 6–3, 6–1	(United States) Rajeev Ram (United Kingdom) Joe Salisbury	(United States) Tommy Paul (Spain) Alejandro Davidovich Fokina	(Spain) Carlos Alcaraz (France) Gaël Monfils (United States) Mackenzie McDonald; Daniil Medvedev
14 Aug	Cincinnati Open; Mason, United States; ATP Masters 1000; Hard – $6,600,000 – 56S/28Q/28D; Singles – Doubles	(Serbia) Novak Djokovic; 5–7, 7–6^{(9–7)}, 7–6^{(7–4)}	(Spain) Carlos Alcaraz	(Poland) Hubert Hurkacz (Germany) Alexander Zverev	(Australia) Max Purcell (Australia) Alexei Popyrin (France) Adrian Mannarino (United States) Taylor Fritz
14 Aug	Cincinnati Open; Mason, United States; ATP Masters 1000; Hard – $6,600,000 – 56S/28Q/28D; Singles – Doubles	(Argentina) Máximo González (Argentina) Andrés Molteni; 3–6, 6–1, [11–9]	(United Kingdom) Jamie Murray (New Zealand) Michael Venus	(Poland) Hubert Hurkacz (Germany) Alexander Zverev	(Australia) Max Purcell (Australia) Alexei Popyrin (France) Adrian Mannarino (United States) Taylor Fritz
21 Aug	Winston-Salem Open; Winston-Salem, United States; ATP 250; Hard – $760,930 – 48S/16Q/16D; Singles – Doubles	(Argentina) Sebastián Báez; 6–4, 6–3	(Czech Republic) Jiří Lehečka	(Croatia) Borna Ćorić (United States) Sebastian Korda	(Argentina) Juan Manuel Cerúndolo (Serbia) Laslo Djere (France) Richard Gasquet (Australia) Max Purcell
21 Aug	Winston-Salem Open; Winston-Salem, United States; ATP 250; Hard – $760,930 – 48S/16Q/16D; Singles – Doubles	(United States) Nathaniel Lammons (United States) Jackson Withrow; 6–3, 6–4	(United Kingdom) Lloyd Glasspool (United Kingdom) Neal Skupski	(Croatia) Borna Ćorić (United States) Sebastian Korda	(Argentina) Juan Manuel Cerúndolo (Serbia) Laslo Djere (France) Richard Gasquet (Australia) Max Purcell
28 Aug; 4 Sep	US Open; New York City, United States; Grand Slam; Hard – $29,148,800; 128S/128Q/64D/32X; Singles – Doubles – Mixed	(Serbia) Novak Djokovic; 6–3, 7–6^{(7–5)}, 6–3	Daniil Medvedev	(Spain) Carlos Alcaraz (United States) Ben Shelton	(Germany) Alexander Zverev; Andrey Rublev (United States) Frances Tiafoe (United States) Taylor Fritz
28 Aug; 4 Sep	US Open; New York City, United States; Grand Slam; Hard – $29,148,800; 128S/128Q/64D/32X; Singles – Doubles – Mixed	(United States) Rajeev Ram (United Kingdom) Joe Salisbury; 2–6, 6–3, 6–4	(India) Rohan Bopanna (Australia) Matthew Ebden	(Spain) Carlos Alcaraz (United States) Ben Shelton	(Germany) Alexander Zverev; Andrey Rublev (United States) Frances Tiafoe (United States) Taylor Fritz
28 Aug; 4 Sep	US Open; New York City, United States; Grand Slam; Hard – $29,148,800; 128S/128Q/64D/32X; Singles – Doubles – Mixed	(Kazakhstan) Anna Danilina (Finland) Harri Heliövaara; 6–3, 6–4	(United States) Jessica Pegula (United States) Austin Krajicek	(Spain) Carlos Alcaraz (United States) Ben Shelton	(Germany) Alexander Zverev; Andrey Rublev (United States) Frances Tiafoe (United States) Taylor Fritz

=== September ===
Week	Tournament	Champions	Runners-up	Semifinalists	Quarterfinalists
11 Sep	Davis Cup Finals group stage Bologna, Italy; Manchester, United Kingdom; Valencia, Spain; Split, Croatia; Hard (i) – 16 teams	Canada (United Kingdom) Great Britain; Czech Republic; Netherlands	Italy; Australia; Serbia; Finland		
18 Sep	Laver Cup; Vancouver, Canada; Hard (i) – $2,250,000	Team World; 13–2	Team Europe		
18 Sep	Chengdu Open; Chengdu, China; ATP 250; Hard – $1,152,805 – 28S/16Q/16D; Singles – Doubles	(Germany) Alexander Zverev; 6–7^{(2–7)}, 7–6^{(7–5)}, 6–3	Roman Safiullin	(Bulgaria) Grigor Dimitrov (Italy) Lorenzo Musetti	(Serbia) Miomir Kecmanović (Australia) Christopher O'Connell (Australia) Jordan Thompson (France) Arthur Rinderknech
18 Sep	Chengdu Open; Chengdu, China; ATP 250; Hard – $1,152,805 – 28S/16Q/16D; Singles – Doubles	(France) Sadio Doumbia (France) Fabien Reboul; 4–6, 7–5, [10–7]	(Portugal) Francisco Cabral (Brazil) Rafael Matos	(Bulgaria) Grigor Dimitrov (Italy) Lorenzo Musetti	(Serbia) Miomir Kecmanović (Australia) Christopher O'Connell (Australia) Jordan Thompson (France) Arthur Rinderknech
18 Sep	Zhuhai Championships; Zhuhai, China; ATP 250; Hard (i) – $981,785 – 28S/16Q/16D; Singles – Doubles	Karen Khachanov; 7–6^{(7–2)}, 6–1	(Japan) Yoshihito Nishioka	(United States) Sebastian Korda; Aslan Karatsev	(United States) Mackenzie McDonald (Argentina) Tomás Martín Etcheverry (Germany) Jan-Lennard Struff (United Kingdom) Cameron Norrie
18 Sep	Zhuhai Championships; Zhuhai, China; ATP 250; Hard (i) – $981,785 – 28S/16Q/16D; Singles – Doubles	(United Kingdom) Jamie Murray (New Zealand) Michael Venus; 6–4, 6–4	(United States) Nathaniel Lammons (United States) Jackson Withrow	(United States) Sebastian Korda; Aslan Karatsev	(United States) Mackenzie McDonald (Argentina) Tomás Martín Etcheverry (Germany) Jan-Lennard Struff (United Kingdom) Cameron Norrie
25 Sep	China Open; Beijing, China; ATP 500; Hard – $3,633,875 – 32S/16Q/16D; Singles – Doubles	(Italy) Jannik Sinner; 7–6^{(7–2)}, 7–6^{(7–2)}	Daniil Medvedev	(Spain) Carlos Alcaraz (Germany) Alexander Zverev	(Norway) Casper Ruud (Bulgaria) Grigor Dimitrov (Chile) Nicolás Jarry (France) Ugo Humbert
25 Sep	China Open; Beijing, China; ATP 500; Hard – $3,633,875 – 32S/16Q/16D; Singles – Doubles	(Croatia) Ivan Dodig (United States) Austin Krajicek; 6–7^{(12–14)}, 6–3, [10–5]	(Netherlands) Wesley Koolhof (United Kingdom) Neal Skupski	(Spain) Carlos Alcaraz (Germany) Alexander Zverev	(Norway) Casper Ruud (Bulgaria) Grigor Dimitrov (Chile) Nicolás Jarry (France) Ugo Humbert
25 Sep	Astana Open; Astana, Kazakhstan; ATP 250; Hard (i) – $1,017,850 – 28S/16Q/16D; Singles – Doubles	(France) Adrian Mannarino; 4–6, 6–3, 6–2	(United States) Sebastian Korda	(Serbia) Hamad Medjedovic (Austria) Sebastian Ofner	(Netherlands) Tallon Griekspoor (Czech Republic) Jiří Lehečka (Austria) Dominic Thiem (Austria) Jurij Rodionov
25 Sep	Astana Open; Astana, Kazakhstan; ATP 250; Hard (i) – $1,017,850 – 28S/16Q/16D; Singles – Doubles	(United States) Nathaniel Lammons (United States) Jackson Withrow; 7–6^{(7–4)}, 7–6^{(9–7)}	(Croatia) Mate Pavić (Australia) John Peers	(Serbia) Hamad Medjedovic (Austria) Sebastian Ofner	(Netherlands) Tallon Griekspoor (Czech Republic) Jiří Lehečka (Austria) Dominic Thiem (Austria) Jurij Rodionov

=== October ===
Week	Tournament	Champions	Runners-up	Semifinalists	Quarterfinalists
2 Oct; 9 Oct	Shanghai Masters; Shanghai, China; ATP Masters 1000; Hard – $8,800,000 – 96S/48Q/32D; Singles – Doubles	(Poland) Hubert Hurkacz; 6–3, 3–6, 7–6^{(10–8)}	Andrey Rublev	(Bulgaria) Grigor Dimitrov (United States) Sebastian Korda	(Chile) Nicolás Jarry (France) Ugo Humbert (Hungary) Fábián Marozsán (United States) Ben Shelton
2 Oct; 9 Oct	Shanghai Masters; Shanghai, China; ATP Masters 1000; Hard – $8,800,000 – 96S/48Q/32D; Singles – Doubles	(Spain) Marcel Granollers (Argentina) Horacio Zeballos; 5–7, 6–2, [10–7]	(India) Rohan Bopanna (Australia) Matthew Ebden	(Bulgaria) Grigor Dimitrov (United States) Sebastian Korda	(Chile) Nicolás Jarry (France) Ugo Humbert (Hungary) Fábián Marozsán (United States) Ben Shelton
16 Oct	Japan Open; Tokyo, Japan; ATP 500; Hard – $2,013,940 – 32S/16Q/16D; Singles – Doubles	(United States) Ben Shelton; 7–5, 6–1	Aslan Karatsev	(Japan) Shintaro Mochizuki (United States) Marcos Giron	(Australia) Alexei Popyrin (Australia) Alex de Minaur (United States) Tommy Paul (Canada) Félix Auger-Aliassime
16 Oct	Japan Open; Tokyo, Japan; ATP 500; Hard – $2,013,940 – 32S/16Q/16D; Singles – Doubles	(Australia) Rinky Hijikata (Australia) Max Purcell; 6–4, 6–1	(United Kingdom) Jamie Murray (New Zealand) Michael Venus	(Japan) Shintaro Mochizuki (United States) Marcos Giron	(Australia) Alexei Popyrin (Australia) Alex de Minaur (United States) Tommy Paul (Canada) Félix Auger-Aliassime
16 Oct	European Open; Antwerp, Belgium; ATP 250; Hard (i) – €673,630 – 28S/16Q/16D; Singles – Doubles	(Kazakhstan) Alexander Bublik; 6–4, 6–4	(France) Arthur Fils	(Greece) Stefanos Tsitsipas (Germany) Maximilian Marterer	(Germany) Yannick Hanfmann (Peru) Juan Pablo Varillas (France) Giovanni Mpetshi Perricard (France) Hugo Gaston
16 Oct	European Open; Antwerp, Belgium; ATP 250; Hard (i) – €673,630 – 28S/16Q/16D; Singles – Doubles	(Greece) Petros Tsitsipas (Greece) Stefanos Tsitsipas; 6–7^{(5–7)}, 6–4, [10–8]	(Uruguay) Ariel Behar (Czech Republic) Adam Pavlásek	(Greece) Stefanos Tsitsipas (Germany) Maximilian Marterer	(Germany) Yannick Hanfmann (Peru) Juan Pablo Varillas (France) Giovanni Mpetshi Perricard (France) Hugo Gaston
16 Oct	Stockholm Open; Stockholm, Sweden; ATP 250; Hard (i) – €673,630 – 28S/16Q/16D; Singles – Doubles	(France) Gaël Monfils; 4–6, 7–6^{(8–6)}, 6–3	Pavel Kotov	(Serbia) Miomir Kecmanović (Serbia) Laslo Djere	(Sweden) Elias Ymer (Netherlands) Tallon Griekspoor (Czech Republic) Tomáš Macháč (France) Adrian Mannarino
16 Oct	Stockholm Open; Stockholm, Sweden; ATP 250; Hard (i) – €673,630 – 28S/16Q/16D; Singles – Doubles	(Kazakhstan) Andrey Golubev (Ukraine) Denys Molchanov; 7–6^{(10–8)}, 6–2	(India) Yuki Bhambri (United Kingdom) Julian Cash	(Serbia) Miomir Kecmanović (Serbia) Laslo Djere	(Sweden) Elias Ymer (Netherlands) Tallon Griekspoor (Czech Republic) Tomáš Macháč (France) Adrian Mannarino
23 Oct	Swiss Indoors; Basel, Switzerland; ATP 500; Hard (i) – €2,196,000 – 32S/16Q/16D; Singles – Doubles	(Canada) Félix Auger-Aliassime; 7–6^{(7–3)}, 7–6^{(7–5)}	(Poland) Hubert Hurkacz	(Denmark) Holger Rune (France) Ugo Humbert	(Argentina) Tomás Martín Etcheverry; Alexander Shevchenko (Netherlands) Tallon Griekspoor (Switzerland) Dominic Stricker
23 Oct	Swiss Indoors; Basel, Switzerland; ATP 500; Hard (i) – €2,196,000 – 32S/16Q/16D; Singles – Doubles	(Mexico) Santiago González (France) Édouard Roger-Vasselin; 6–7^{(8–10)}, 7–6^{(7–3)}, [10–1]	(Monaco) Hugo Nys (Poland) Jan Zieliński	(Denmark) Holger Rune (France) Ugo Humbert	(Argentina) Tomás Martín Etcheverry; Alexander Shevchenko (Netherlands) Tallon Griekspoor (Switzerland) Dominic Stricker
23 Oct	Vienna Open; Vienna, Austria; ATP 500; Hard (i) – €2,409,835 – 32S/16Q/16D; Singles – Doubles	(Italy) Jannik Sinner; 7–6^{(9–7)}, 4–6, 6–3	Daniil Medvedev	(Greece) Stefanos Tsitsipas; Andrey Rublev	Karen Khachanov (Croatia) Borna Gojo (Germany) Alexander Zverev (United States) Frances Tiafoe
23 Oct	Vienna Open; Vienna, Austria; ATP 500; Hard (i) – €2,409,835 – 32S/16Q/16D; Singles – Doubles	(United States) Rajeev Ram (United Kingdom) Joe Salisbury; 6–4, 5–7, [12–10]	(United States) Nathaniel Lammons (United States) Jackson Withrow	(Greece) Stefanos Tsitsipas; Andrey Rublev	Karen Khachanov (Croatia) Borna Gojo (Germany) Alexander Zverev (United States) Frances Tiafoe
30 Oct	Paris Masters; Paris, France; ATP Masters 1000; Hard (i) – €5,779,335 – 56S/28Q/24D; Singles – Doubles	(Serbia) Novak Djokovic; 6–4, 6–3	(Bulgaria) Grigor Dimitrov	Andrey Rublev (Greece) Stefanos Tsitsipas	(Denmark) Holger Rune (Australia) Alex de Minaur (Poland) Hubert Hurkacz; Karen Khachanov
30 Oct	Paris Masters; Paris, France; ATP Masters 1000; Hard (i) – €5,779,335 – 56S/28Q/24D; Singles – Doubles	(Mexico) Santiago González (France) Édouard Roger-Vasselin; 6–2, 5–7, [10–7]	(India) Rohan Bopanna (Australia) Matthew Ebden	Andrey Rublev (Greece) Stefanos Tsitsipas	(Denmark) Holger Rune (Australia) Alex de Minaur (Poland) Hubert Hurkacz; Karen Khachanov

=== November ===
Week	Tournament	Champions	Runners-up	Semifinalists	Quarterfinalists
6 Nov	Moselle Open; Metz, France; ATP 250; Hard (i) – €562,815 – 28S/16Q/16D; Singles – Doubles	(France) Ugo Humbert; 6–3, 6–3	Alexander Shevchenko	(Italy) Fabio Fognini (France) Pierre-Hugues Herbert	(Italy) Lorenzo Sonego (France) Harold Mayot; Karen Khachanov (France) Luca Van Assche
6 Nov	Moselle Open; Metz, France; ATP 250; Hard (i) – €562,815 – 28S/16Q/16D; Singles – Doubles	(Monaco) Hugo Nys (Poland) Jan Zieliński; 6–4, 6–4	(Germany) Constantin Frantzen (Germany) Hendrik Jebens	(Italy) Fabio Fognini (France) Pierre-Hugues Herbert	(Italy) Lorenzo Sonego (France) Harold Mayot; Karen Khachanov (France) Luca Van Assche
6 Nov	Sofia Open; Sofia, Bulgaria; ATP 250; Hard (i) – €562,815 – 28S/16Q/16D; Singles – Doubles	(France) Adrian Mannarino; 7–6^{(8–6)}, 2–6, 6–3	(United Kingdom) Jack Draper	(Germany) Jan-Lennard Struff; Pavel Kotov	(Turkey) Cem İlkel (Hungary) Fábián Marozsán (Hungary) Márton Fucsovics (Austria) Sebastian Ofner
6 Nov	Sofia Open; Sofia, Bulgaria; ATP 250; Hard (i) – €562,815 – 28S/16Q/16D; Singles – Doubles	(Ecuador) Gonzalo Escobar (Kazakhstan) Aleksandr Nedovyesov; 6–3, 3–6, [13–11]	(United Kingdom) Julian Cash (Croatia) Nikola Mektić	(Germany) Jan-Lennard Struff; Pavel Kotov	(Turkey) Cem İlkel (Hungary) Fábián Marozsán (Hungary) Márton Fucsovics (Austria) Sebastian Ofner
13 Nov	ATP Finals; Turin, Italy; ATP Finals; Hard (i) – $15,000,000 – 8S/8D (RR); Singles – Doubles	(Serbia) Novak Djokovic; 6–3, 6–3	(Italy) Jannik Sinner	Daniil Medvedev (Spain) Carlos Alcaraz	Round robin (Denmark) Holger Rune (Poland) Hubert Hurkacz (Greece) Stefanos Tsitsipas (Germany) Alexander Zverev; Andrey Rublev
13 Nov	ATP Finals; Turin, Italy; ATP Finals; Hard (i) – $15,000,000 – 8S/8D (RR); Singles – Doubles	(United States) Rajeev Ram (United Kingdom) Joe Salisbury; 6–3, 6–4	(Spain) Marcel Granollers (Argentina) Horacio Zeballos	Daniil Medvedev (Spain) Carlos Alcaraz	Round robin (Denmark) Holger Rune (Poland) Hubert Hurkacz (Greece) Stefanos Tsitsipas (Germany) Alexander Zverev; Andrey Rublev
20 Nov	Davis Cup Finals knockout stage Málaga, Spain; Hard (i)	Italy; 2–0	Australia	Finland; Serbia	Canada; Czech Republic; Netherlands; Great Britain
27 Nov	Next Gen ATP Finals; Jeddah, Saudi Arabia; Next Generation ATP Finals; Hard (i) – $2,000,000– 8S (RR); Singles	(Serbia) Hamad Medjedovic; 3–4^{(6–8)}, 4–1, 4–2, 3–4^{(9–11)}, 4–1	(France) Arthur Fils	(France) Luca Van Assche (Switzerland) Dominic Stricker	Round robin (Italy) Flavio Cobolli (Italy) Luca Nardi (Jordan) Abdullah Shelbayh (United States) Alex Michelsen

=== December ===
No tournaments were played.

=== Cancelled tournaments ===
Week of	Tournament	Status
16 Oct	Kremlin Cup; Moscow, Russia; ATP 250; Hard (i)	Suspended due to the Russian invasion of Ukraine
6 Nov	Tel Aviv Open; Tel Aviv, Israel; ATP 250; Hard (i)	Cancelled due to the Gaza war

== Statistical information ==
These tables present the number of singles (S), doubles (D), and mixed doubles (X) titles won by each player and each nation during the season, within all the tournament categories of the 2023 calendar : the Grand Slam tournaments, the ATP Finals, the ATP Tour Masters 1000, the ATP Tour 500 tournaments, and the ATP Tour 250 tournaments. The players/nations are sorted by:

1. Total number of titles (a doubles title won by two players representing the same nation counts as only one win for the nation);
2. Cumulated importance of those titles (one Grand Slam win equalling two Masters 1000 wins, one undefeated ATP Finals win equalling one-and-a-half Masters 1000 win, one Masters 1000 win equalling two 500 events wins, one 500 event win equalling two 250 events wins);
3. A singles > doubles > mixed doubles hierarchy;
4. Alphabetical order (by family names for players).

Key
Grand Slam tournaments
ATP Finals
ATP Masters 1000
ATP 500
ATP 250

=== Titles won by player ===
Total	Player	Grand Slam			ATP Finals		ATP Masters 1000		ATP 500		ATP 250		Total		
Total	Player	S	D	X	S	D	S	D	S	D	S	D	S	D	X
7	Novak Djokovic (SRB)	● ● ●			●		● ●				●		7	0	0
6	Carlos Alcaraz (ESP)	●					● ●		● ●		●		6	0	0
5	Ivan Dodig (CRO)		●					●		● ● ●			0	5	0
5	Austin Krajicek (USA)		●					●		● ● ●			0	5	0
5	Daniil Medvedev (Note: As of 1 March 2022, the ATP announced that players from Russia and Belarus will not compete in tournaments under the name or flag of Russia or Belarus due to the Russian invasion of Ukraine.)						● ●		● ●		●		5	0	0
5	Santiago González (MEX)							● ●		●		● ●	0	5	0
5	Édouard Roger-Vasselin (FRA)							● ●		●		● ●	0	5	0
5	Máximo González (ARG)							●		● ● ●		●	0	5	0
5	Andrés Molteni (ARG)							●		● ● ●		●	0	5	0
4	Rajeev Ram (USA)		●			●				●		●	0	4	0
4	Joe Salisbury (GBR)		●			●				●		●	0	4	0
4	Mate Pavić (CRO)			●								● ● ●	0	3	1
4	Jannik Sinner (ITA)						●		● ●		●		4	0	0
4	Jamie Murray (GBR)											● ● ● ●	0	4	0
4	Nathaniel Lammons (USA)											● ● ● ●	0	4	0
4	Michael Venus (NZL)											● ● ● ●	0	4	0
4	Jackson Withrow (USA)											● ● ● ●	0	4	0
3	Andrey Rublev						●	●			●		2	1	0
3	Marcelo Arévalo (ESA)							●				● ●	0	3	0
3	Jean-Julien Rojer (NED)							●				● ●	0	3	0
3	Alexander Erler (AUT)									●		● ●	0	3	0
3	Lucas Miedler (AUT)									●		● ●	0	3	0
3	Sebastián Báez (ARG)										● ● ●		3	0	0
3	Adrian Mannarino (FRA)										● ● ●		3	0	0
3	Nikola Mektić (CRO)											● ● ●	0	3	0
2	Rinky Hijikata (AUS)		●							●			0	2	0
2	Tim Pütz (GER)			●						●			0	1	1
2	Wesley Koolhof (NED)		●									●	0	2	0
2	Neal Skupski (GBR)		●									●	0	2	0
2	Harri Heliövaara (FIN)			●								●	0	1	1
2	Hubert Hurkacz (POL)						●				●		2	0	0
2	Karen Khachanov							●			●		1	1	0
2	Rohan Bopanna (IND)							●				●	0	2	0
2	Matthew Ebden (AUS)							●				●	0	2	0
2	Hugo Nys (MON)							●				●	0	2	0
2	Jan Zieliński (POL)							●				●	0	2	0
2	Alexander Bublik (KAZ)								●		●		2	0	0
2	Alexander Zverev (GER)								●		●		2	0	0
2	Max Purcell (AUS)									●		●	0	2	0
2	Taylor Fritz (USA)										● ●		2	0	0
2	Tallon Griekspoor (NED)										● ●		2	0	0
2	Nicolás Jarry (CHI)										● ●		2	0	0
2	Frances Tiafoe (USA)										● ●		2	0	0
2	Stefanos Tsitsipas (GRE)										●	●	1	1	0
2	Gonzalo Escobar (ECU)											● ●	0	2	0
2	Sander Gillé (BEL)											● ●	0	2	0
2	Aleksandr Nedovyesov (KAZ)											● ●	0	2	0
2	Andrea Vavassori (ITA)											● ●	0	2	0
2	Joran Vliegen (BEL)											● ●	0	2	0
1	Jason Kubler (AUS)		●										0	1	0
1	Rafael Matos (BRA)			●									0	0	1
1	Marcel Granollers (ESP)							●					0	1	0
1	Horacio Zeballos (ARG)							●					0	1	0
1	Félix Auger-Aliassime (CAN)								●				1	0	0
1	Dan Evans (GBR)								●				1	0	0
1	Alex de Minaur (AUS)								●				1	0	0
1	Cameron Norrie (GBR)								●				1	0	0
1	Ben Shelton (USA)								●				1	0	0
1	Maxime Cressy (USA)									●			0	1	0
1	Kevin Krawietz (GER)									●			0	1	0
1	Fabrice Martin (FRA)									●			0	1	0
1	Marcelo Melo (BRA)									●			0	1	0
1	John Peers (AUS)									●			0	1	0
1	Roberto Carballés Baena (ESP)										●		1	0	0
1	Pedro Cachin (ARG)										●		1	0	0
1	Francisco Cerúndolo (ARG)										●		1	0	0
1	Christopher Eubanks (USA)										●		1	0	0
1	Arthur Fils (FRA)										●		1	0	0
1	Richard Gasquet (FRA)										●		1	0	0
1	Ugo Humbert (FRA)										●		1	0	0
1	Kwon Soon-woo (KOR)										●		1	0	0
1	Dušan Lajović (SRB)										●		1	0	0
1	Gaël Monfils (FRA)										●		1	0	0
1	Alexei Popyrin (AUS)										●		1	0	0
1	Holger Rune (DEN)										●		1	0	0
1	Casper Ruud (NOR)										●		1	0	0
1	Wu Yibing (CHN)										●		1	0	0
1	Yuki Bhambri (IND)											●	0	1	0
1	Simone Bolelli (ITA)											●	0	1	0
1	Marcelo Demoliner (BRA)											●	0	1	0
1	Sadio Doumbia (FRA)											●	0	1	0
1	Fabio Fognini (ITA)											●	0	1	0
1	Lloyd Glasspool (GBR)											●	0	1	0
1	Andrey Golubev (KAZ)											●	0	1	0
1	Robin Haase (NED)											●	0	1	0
1	Lloyd Harris (RSA)											●	0	1	0
1	Matwé Middelkoop (NED)											●	0	1	0
1	Denys Molchanov (UKR)											●	0	1	0
1	Andrea Pellegrino (ITA)											●	0	1	0
1	Fabien Reboul (FRA)											●	0	1	0
1	Blaž Rola (SLO)											●	0	1	0
1	Nino Serdarušić (CRO)											●	0	1	0
1	Dominic Stricker (SUI)											●	0	1	0
1	Jordan Thompson (AUS)											●	0	1	0
1	Petros Tsitsipas (GRE)											●	0	1	0
1	Stan Wawrinka (SUI)											●	0	1	0

=== Titles won by nation (russia not included) ===
Total	Nation	Grand Slam			ATP Finals		ATP Masters 1000		ATP 500		ATP 250		Total		
Total	Nation	S	D	X	S	D	S	D	S	D	S	D	S	D	X
20	United States (USA)		2			1		1	1	5	5	5	6	14	0
14	France (FRA)							2		2	7	3	7	7	0
13	Great Britain (GBR)		2			1			2	1		7	2	11	0
11	Argentina (ARG)							2		3	5	1	5	6	0
10	Croatia (CRO)		1	1				1		3		4	0	9	1
8	Serbia (SRB)	3			1		2				2		8	0	0
8	Spain (ESP)	1					2	1	2		2		7	1	0
8	Australia (AUS)		1					1	1	2	1	2	2	6	0
8	Netherlands (NED)		1					1			2	4	2	6	0
7	Italy (ITA)						1		2		1	3	4	3	0
5	Mexico (MEX)							2		1		2	0	5	0
5	Kazakhstan (KAZ)								1		1	3	2	3	0
4	Germany (GER)			1					1	1	1		2	1	1
4	Poland (POL)						1	1			1		2	2	0
4	New Zealand (NZL)											4	0	4	0
3	Brazil (BRA)			1						1		1	0	2	1
3	El Salvador (ESA)							1				2	0	3	0
3	India (IND)							1				2	0	3	0
3	Austria (AUT)									1		2	0	3	0
2	Finland (FIN)			1								1	0	1	1
2	Monaco (MON)							1				1	0	2	0
2	Chile (CHI)										2		2	0	0
2	Greece (GRE)										1	1	1	1	0
2	Belgium (BEL)											2	0	2	0
2	Ecuador (ECU)											2	0	2	0
1	Canada (CAN)								1				1	0	0
1	China (CHN)										1		1	0	0
1	Denmark (DEN)										1		1	0	0
1	Norway (NOR)										1		1	0	0
1	South Korea (KOR)										1		1	0	0
1	Slovenia (SLO)											1	0	1	0
1	South Africa (RSA)											1	0	1	0
1	Switzerland (SWI)											1	0	1	0
1	Ukraine (UKR)											1	0	1	0

=== Titles information ===
The following players won their first main circuit title in singles, doubles or mixed doubles:

Singles

- (Netherlands) Tallon Griekspoor (26 years, 189 days) – Pune (draw)
- (China) Wu Yibing (23 years, 121 days) – Dallas (draw)
- (France) Arthur Fils (18 years, 349 days) – Lyon (draw)
- (United States) Christopher Eubanks (27 years, 57 days) – Mallorca (draw)
- (Argentina) Pedro Cachin (28 years, 102 days) – Gstaad (draw)
- (United States) Ben Shelton (21 years, 13 days) – Tokyo (draw)

Doubles

- (Australia) Rinky Hijikata (21 years, 339 days) – **Australian Open (draw)**
- (Australia) Jason Kubler (29 years, 254 days) – **Australian Open (draw)**
- (United States) Maxime Cressy (25 years, 300 days) – Dubai (draw)
- (Italy) Andrea Pellegrino (25 years, 346 days) – Santiago (draw)
- Karen Khachanov (26 years, 350 days) – Madrid (draw)
- (India) Yuki Bhambri (30 years, 362 days) – Mallorca (draw)
- (South Africa) Lloyd Harris (26 years, 127 days) – Mallorca (draw)
- (Kazakhstan) Aleksandr Nedovyesov (36 years, 158 days) – Båstad (draw)
- (Slovenia) Blaž Rola (32 years, 297 days) – Umag (draw)
- (Croatia) Nino Serdarušić (26 years, 228 days) – Umag (draw)
- (France) Sadio Doumbia (32 years, 287 days) – Chengdu (draw)
- (France) Fabien Reboul (27 years, 290 days) – Chengdu (draw)
- (Kazakhstan) Andrey Golubev (36 years, 92 days) – Stockholm (draw)
- (Greece) Petros Tsitsipas (23 years, 87 days) – Antwerp (draw)

Mixed doubles

- (Brazil) Rafael Matos (27 years, 21 days) – **Australian Open (draw)**
- (Germany) Tim Pütz (35 years, 201 days) – **French Open (draw)**
- (Finland) Harri Heliövaara (34 years, 97 days) – **US Open (draw)**

The following players defended a main circuit title in singles, doubles, or mixed doubles:

Singles

- (Spain) Carlos Alcaraz – Barcelona (draw), Madrid (draw)
- (Denmark) Holger Rune – Munich (draw)
- (Canada) Félix Auger-Aliassime – Basel (draw)
- (Serbia) Novak Djokovic – **ATP Finals** (**draw**)

Doubles

- (Argentina) Andrés Molteni – Córdoba (draw)
- (El Salvador) Marcelo Arévalo – Delray Beach (draw)
- (Netherlands) Jean-Julien Rojer – Delray Beach (draw)
- (Netherlands) Wesley Koolhof – 's-Hertogenbosch (draw)
- (United Kingdom) Neal Skupski – 's-Hertogenbosch (draw)
- (Croatia) Mate Pavić – Stuttgart (draw), Eastbourne (draw)
- (Croatia) Nikola Mektić – Eastbourne (draw)
- (United States) Rajeev Ram – **US Open (draw)**, **ATP Finals** (**draw**)
- (United Kingdom) Joe Salisbury – **US Open (draw)**, **ATP Finals** (**draw**)
- (Croatia) Ivan Dodig – Beijing (draw)
- (Monaco) Hugo Nys – Metz (draw)
- (Poland) Jan Zieliński – Metz (draw)

=== Best ranking ===
The following players achieved their career high ranking in this season inside top 50 (in bold the players who entered the top 10 or became the world No. 1 for the first time): (Note: Name and ranking in bold means the player entered top 10 or became world No. 1 for the first time, and only the ranking in bold means the player had entered the top 10 in a previous season but reached a new career high ranking.)

Singles

- (Serbia) Miomir Kecmanović (reached place No. 27 on January 16)
- (United Kingdom) Jack Draper (reached place No. 38 on January 16)
- (France) Benjamin Bonzi (reached place No. 42 on February 6)
- (France) Constant Lestienne (reached place No. 48 on February 6)
- (United States) J. J. Wolf (reached place No. 39 on February 13)
- (Switzerland) Marc-Andrea Hüsler (reached place No. 47 on February 13)
- (Argentina) Federico Coria (reached place No. 49 on February 13)
- (United States) Taylor Fritz (reached place **No. 5** on February 27)
- (Finland) Emil Ruusuvuori (reached place No. 37 on April 3)
- (Spain) Roberto Carballés Baena (reached place No. 49 on April 10)
- (Sweden) Mikael Ymer (reached place No. 50 on April 17)
- (Spain) Bernabé Zapata Miralles (reached place No. 37 on May 22)
- (China) Wu Yibing (reached place No. 54 on May 29)
- (United States) **Frances Tiafoe** (reached place **No. 10** on June 19)
- (Argentina) Francisco Cerúndolo (reached place No. 19 on June 19)
- (Germany) Jan-Lennard Struff (reached place No. 21 on June 19)
- (Japan) Yoshihito Nishioka (reached place No. 24 on June 19)
- (Argentina) Tomás Martín Etcheverry (reached place No. 30 on June 19)
- (Italy) Lorenzo Musetti (reached place No. 15 on June 26)
- (Germany) Yannick Hanfmann (reached place No. 45 on July 3)
- (France) Grégoire Barrère (reached place No. 49 on July 3)
- (Kazakhstan) Alexander Bublik (reached place No. 25 on July 31)
- (United States) Christopher Eubanks (reached place No. 29 on July 31)
- (United Kingdom) Dan Evans (reached place No. 21 on August 7)
- (Argentina) Pedro Cachín (reached place No. 48 on August 7)
- (Australia) Aleksandar Vukic (reached place No. 48 on August 14)
- (Denmark) Holger Rune (reached place **No. 4** on August 21)
- (Spain) Alejandro Davidovich Fokina (reached place No. 21 on August 21)
- (Czech Republic) Jiří Lehečka (reached place No. 29 on August 28)
- (Argentina) Sebastián Báez (reached place No. 27 on September 25)
- (Italy) Jannik Sinner (reached place **No. 4** on October 2)
- (Australia) Alex de Minaur (reached place No. 11 on October 2)
- (United States) Tommy Paul (reached place No. 12 on October 2)
- (Germany) Daniel Altmaier (reached place No. 47 on October 2)
- (United States) Sebastian Korda (reached place No. 23 on October 16)
- (United States) Mackenzie McDonald (reached place No. 37 on October 16)
- (Australia) Max Purcell (reached place No. 40 on October 16)
- (United States) Ben Shelton (reached place No. 15 on October 23)
- (Australia) Alexei Popyrin (reached place No. 39 on October 23)
- (France) Arthur Fils (reached place No. 36 on October 30)
- (Italy) Matteo Arnaldi (reached place No. 41 on October 30)
- (Chile) Nicolás Jarry (reached place No. 19 on November 6)
- (Netherlands) Tallon Griekspoor (reached place No. 21 on November 6)
- Roman Safiullin (reached place No. 39 on November 6)
- (France) Ugo Humbert (reached place No. 20 on November 13)
- (Austria) Sebastian Ofner (reached place No. 43 on November 13)
- Alexander Shevchenko (reached place No. 49 on November 13)

Doubles

- (Netherlands) Matwé Middelkoop (reached place No. 18 on February 6)
- (Brazil) Rafael Matos (reached place No. 26 on February 6)
- (Spain) David Vega Hernández (reached place No. 28 on February 13)
- (France) Fabrice Martin (reached place No. 19 on April 24)
- (Austria) Alexander Erler (reached place No. 32 on May 8)
- (Austria) Lucas Miedler (reached place No. 33 on May 8)
- (Australia) Jason Kubler (reached place No. 27 on May 22)
- (Netherlands) Robin Haase (reached place No. 29 on May 22)
- (United Kingdom) Henry Patten (reached place No. 50 on May 22)
- (United States) **Austin Krajicek** (reached place **No. 1** on June 12)
- (United Kingdom) **Lloyd Glasspool** (reached place **No. 7** on June 12)
- (Finland) **Harri Heliövaara** (reached place **No. 7** on June 12)
- (Monaco) Hugo Nys (reached place No. 12 on June 12)
- (Poland) **Jan Zieliński** (reached place **No. 7** on June 19)
- (Austria) Sam Weissborn (reached place No. 50 on July 17)
- (Italy) Andrea Vavassori (reached place No. 41 on July 31)
- (Belgium) Joran Vliegen (reached place No. 17 on August 7)
- (Monaco) Romain Arneodo (reached place No. 50 on August 14)
- (Argentina) **Andrés Molteni** (reached place **No. 7** on August 21)
- (Croatia) Ivan Dodig (reached place **No. 2** on September 11)
- (Argentina) **Máximo González** (reached place **No. 10** on September 11)
- (United States) Nathaniel Lammons (reached place No. 27 on September 11)
- (France) Albano Olivetti (reached place No. 49 on September 11)
- (Belgium) Sander Gillé (reached place No. 18 on September 25)
- (United States) Mackenzie McDonald (reached place No. 49 on October 2)
- (Kazakhstan) Aleksandr Nedovyesov (reached place No. 43 on October 16)
- (Australia) Rinky Hijikata (reached place No. 23 on October 30)
- (United States) Robert Galloway (reached place No. 44 on October 30)
- (France) Sadio Doumbia (reached place No. 34 on November 6)
- (France) Fabien Reboul (reached place No. 36 on November 6)
- Andrey Rublev (reached place No. 44 on November 6)
- (United Kingdom) Julian Cash (reached place No. 47 on November 6)
- (Australia) **Matthew Ebden** (reached place **No. 4** on November 13)
- (Mexico) **Santiago González** (reached place **No. 7** on November 13)
- (United States) Jackson Withrow (reached place No. 22 on November 13)

== ATP rankings ==
Below are the tables for the yearly ATP Race rankings (Note: The ATP Race rankings measure the points a player (for singles) or team (for doubles) has accumulated over the season leading up to the year-end ATP Finals.) and the ATP rankings (Note: The ATP rankings are the weekly computer ratings defined by the ATP and are based on a rolling, 52-week cumulative system.) of the top 20 singles players, doubles players, and doubles teams.

=== Singles ===
Final Singles Race rankings
No.	Player	Points	Tourn
1	Novak Djokovic (SRB)	9,945	11
2	Carlos Alcaraz (ESP)	8,455	16
3	Daniil Medvedev	7,200	21
4	Jannik Sinner (ITA)	5,490	21
5	Andrey Rublev	4,805	24
6	Stefanos Tsitsipas (GRE)	4,235	23
7	Alexander Zverev (GER)	3,585	26
8	Holger Rune (DEN)	3,460	22
9	Hubert Hurkacz (POL)	3,245	23
10	Taylor Fritz (USA)	3,100	26
11	Casper Ruud (NOR)	2,825	20
12	Tommy Paul (USA)	2,665	26
13	Alex de Minaur (AUS)	2,605	25
14	Grigor Dimitrov (BUL)	2,570	23
15	Karen Khachanov	2,520	22
16	Frances Tiafoe (USA)	2,310	22
17	Ben Shelton (USA)	2,215	28
18	Cameron Norrie (GBR)	1,940	24
19	Nicolás Jarry (CHI)	1,810	22
20	Ugo Humbert (FRA)	1,765	26

Qualifiers for the 2023 ATP Finals.

Year-end rankings 2023 (26 December 2023)
#	Player	Points	#Trn	'22 Rk	High	Low	'22→'23
1	Novak Djokovic (SRB)	11,245	18	5	1	5	▲4
2	Carlos Alcaraz (ESP)	8,855	18	1	1	2	▼1
3	Daniil Medvedev	7,600	22	7	2	12	▲4
4	Jannik Sinner (ITA)	6,490	23	15	4	17	▲11
5	Andrey Rublev	4,805	25	8	5	8	▲3
6	Stefanos Tsitsipas (GRE)	4,235	26	4	4	7	▼2
7	Alexander Zverev (GER)	3,985	26	12	7	27	▲5
8	Holger Rune (DEN)	3,660	20	11	4	11	▲3
9	Hubert Hurkacz (POL)	3,245	24	10	9	20	▲1
10	Taylor Fritz (USA)	3,100	26	9	5	10	▼1
11	Casper Ruud (NOR)	2,825	24	3	3	11	▼8
12	Alex de Minaur (AUS)	2,740	25	24	12	25	▲12
13	Tommy Paul (USA)	2,665	26	32	12	35	▲19
14	Grigor Dimitrov (BUL)	2,570	23	28	14	33	▲14
15	Karen Khachanov	2,520	22	20	10	20	▲5
16	Frances Tiafoe (USA)	2,310	22	19	10	19	▲3
17	Ben Shelton (USA)	2,145	26	97	16	97	▲80
18	Cameron Norrie (GBR)	1,940	25	14	11	18	▼4
19	Nicolás Jarry (CHI)	1,810	22	153	19	155	▲134
20	Ugo Humbert (FRA)	1,765	28	86	20	108	▲66

==== No. 1 ranking ====
Holder	Date gained	Date forfeited
Carlos Alcaraz (ESP)	Year end 2022	29 January 2023
Novak Djokovic (SRB)	30 January 2023	19 March 2023
Carlos Alcaraz (ESP)	20 March 2023	2 April 2023
Novak Djokovic (SRB)	3 April 2023	21 May 2023
Carlos Alcaraz (ESP)	22 May 2023	11 June 2023
Novak Djokovic (SRB)	12 June 2023	25 June 2023
Carlos Alcaraz (ESP)	26 June 2023	10 September 2023
Novak Djokovic (SRB)	11 September 2023	Year end 2023

=== Doubles ===
Final Doubles Race rankings
No.	Team	Points	Tourn
1	Ivan Dodig (CRO); Austin Krajicek (USA)	6,330	19
2	Wesley Koolhof (NED); Neal Skupski (GBR)	6,060	22
3	Rohan Bopanna (IND); Matthew Ebden (AUS)	5,990	20
4	Santiago González (MEX); Édouard Roger-Vasselin (FRA)	5,610	26
5	Marcel Granollers (ESP); Horacio Zeballos (ARG)	5,127	20
6	Rajeev Ram (USA); Joe Salisbury (GBR)	4,822	22
7	Máximo González (ARG); Andrés Molteni (ARG)	4,380	25
8	Nathaniel Lammons (USA); Jackson Withrow (USA)	4,025	33
9	Jamie Murray (GBR); Michael Venus (NZL)	3,850	28
10	Marcelo Arévalo (ESA); Jean-Julien Rojer (NED)	3,840	23
17 (Note: Hijikata and Kubler clinched the 8th spot by winning a Grand Slam, the Australian Open, and finishing inside the Top 20.)	Rinky Hijikata (AUS); Jason Kubler (AUS)	2,180	8

Qualifiers for the 2023 ATP Finals.

Year-end rankings 2023 (26 December 2023)
#	Player	Points	#Trn	'22 Rank	High	Low	'22→'23
1	Austin Krajicek (USA)	7,130	23	10	1	10	▲9
2	Ivan Dodig (CRO)	6,620	21	9	2	11	▲7
3	Rohan Bopanna (IND)	6,390	22	19	3	20	▲16
4	Matthew Ebden (AUS)	6,390	25	26	4	46	▲22
5	Horacio Zeballos (ARG)	6,307	21	14	5	26	▲9
6	Rajeev Ram (USA)	6,290	24	3	1	11	▼3
7	Joe Salisbury (GBR)	6,290	24	4	2	12	▼3
8	Wesley Koolhof (NED)	6,170	23	1	1	8	▼7
9	Neal Skupski (GBR)	6,170	24	1	1	9	▼8
10	Marcel Granollers (ESP)	6,127	22	17	10	30	▲7
11	Santiago González (MEX)	5,830	28	28	7	37	▲17
11	Édouard Roger-Vasselin (FRA)	5,830	28	32	7	37	▲21
13	Máximo González (ARG)	4,290	26	45	10	48	▲32
13	Andrés Molteni (ARG)	4,290	26	38	7	42	▲25
15	Hugo Nys (MON)	3,885	31	41	12	41	▲26
16	Jamie Murray (GBR)	3,850	28	36	16	40	▲20
16	Michael Venus (NZL)	3,850	28	16	13	27	Steady
18	Jean-Julien Rojer (NED)	3,840	24	6	5	21	▼12
19	Marcelo Arévalo (ESA)	3,840	25	6	5	21	▼13
20	Jan Zieliński (POL)	3,840	28	34	7	36	▲14

==== No. 1 ranking ====
Holder	Date gained	Date forfeited
Wesley Koolhof (NED); Neal Skupski (GBR)	Year end 2022	15 January 2023
Rajeev Ram (USA)	16 January 2023	29 January 2023
Wesley Koolhof (NED); Neal Skupski (GBR)	30 January 2023	19 February 2023
Rajeev Ram (USA)	20 February 2023	5 March 2023
Wesley Koolhof (NED); Neal Skupski (GBR)	6 March 2023	11 June 2023
Austin Krajicek (USA)	12 June 2023	18 June 2023
Wesley Koolhof (NED); Neal Skupski (GBR)	19 June 2023	25 June 2023
Austin Krajicek (USA)	26 June 2023	16 July 2023
Wesley Koolhof (NED); Neal Skupski (GBR)	17 July 2023	27 August 2023
Neal Skupski (GBR)	28 August 2023	10 September 2023
Austin Krajicek (USA)	11 September 2023	Year end 2023

== Point distribution ==
Points are awarded as follows:

Category	W	F	SF	QF	R16	R32	R64	R128	Q	Q3	Q2	Q1
Grand Slam (128S)	2000	1200	720	360	180	90	45	10	25	16	8	0
Grand Slam (64D)	2000	1200	720	360	180	90	0	–	25	–	0	0
ATP Finals (8S/8D)	1500 (max); 1100 (min)	1000 (max); 600 (min)	600 (max); 200 (min)	200 for each round robin match win, +400 for a semifinal win, +500 for the final win.								
ATP Tour Masters 1000 (96S)	1000	600	360	180	90	45	25	10	16	–	8	0
ATP Tour Masters 1000 (56S)	1000	600	360	180	90	45	10	–	25	–	16	0
ATP Tour Masters 1000 (32D/28D)	1000	600	360	180	90	0	–	–	–	–	–	–
ATP Tour 500 (48S)	500	300	180	90	45	20	0	–	10	–	4	0
ATP Tour 500 (32S)	500	300	180	90	45	0	–	–	20	–	10	0
ATP Tour 500 (16D)	500	300	180	90	0	–	–	–	45	–	25	0
ATP Tour 250 (48S)	250	150	90	45	20	10	0	–	5	–	3	0
ATP Tour 250 (32S/28S)	250	150	90	45	20	0	–	–	12	–	6	0
ATP Tour 250 (16D)	250	150	90	45	0	–	–	–	–	–	–	–
United Cup	500 (max)	For details, see 2023 United Cup										

== Prize money leaders ==
Prize money in US$ as of 4 December 2023
#	Player	Singles	Doubles	Year-to-date
1	(Serbia) Novak Djokovic	$15,936,097	$15,947	$15,952,044
2	(Spain) Carlos Alcaraz	$10,753,431	$0	$10,753,431
3	Daniil Medvedev	$9,239,679	$0	$9,239,679
4	(Italy) Jannik Sinner	$8,298,379	$51,013	$8,349,392
5	Andrey Rublev	$5,120,571	$368,363	$5,488,934
6	(Germany) Alexander Zverev	$4,820,664	$104,438	$4,925,102
7	(Greece) Stefanos Tsitsipas	$4,700,015	$152,251	$4,852,266
8	(Denmark) Holger Rune	$4,141,419	$22,511	$4,163,930
9	(Poland) Hubert Hurkacz	$3,805,176	$98,249	$3,903,425
10	(United States) Taylor Fritz	$3,380,455	$95,648	$3,476,103

== Best matches by ATPTour.com ==
=== Best 5 Grand Slam tournament matches ===
	Event	Round	Surface	Winner	Opponent	Result
1.	Wimbledon	F	Grass	(Spain) Carlos Alcaraz	(Serbia) Novak Djokovic	1–6, 7–6^{(8–6)}, 6–1, 3–6, 6–4
2.	Australian Open	R1	Hard	(United Kingdom) Andy Murray	(Italy) Matteo Berrettini	6–3, 6–3, 4–6, 6–7^{(7–9)}, 7–6^{(10–6)}
3.	Australian Open	R2	Hard	(United Kingdom) Andy Murray	(Australia) Thanasi Kokkinakis	4–6, 6–7^{(4–7)}, 7–6^{(7–5)}, 6–3, 7–5
4.	US Open	R4	Hard	(Germany) Alexander Zverev	(Italy) Jannik Sinner	6–4, 3–6, 6–2, 4–6, 6–3
5.	Wimbledon	R1	Grass	(Greece) Stefanos Tsitsipas	(Austria) Dominic Thiem	3–6, 7–6^{(7–1)}, 6–2, 6–7^{(5–7)}, 7–6^{(10–8)}

=== Best 5 ATP Tour matches ===
	Event	Round	Surface	Winner	Opponent	Result
1.	Cincinnati Open	F	Hard	(Serbia) Novak Djokovic	(Spain) Carlos Alcaraz	5–7, 7–6^{(9–7)}, 7–6^{(7–4)}
2.	ATP Finals	RR	Hard (i)	(Italy) Jannik Sinner	(Serbia) Novak Djokovic	7–5, 6–7^{(5–7)}, 7–6^{(7–2)}
3.	Miami Open	SF	Hard	(Italy) Jannik Sinner	(Spain) Carlos Alcaraz	6–7^{(4–7)}, 6–4, 6–2
4.	Adelaide International 1	F	Hard	(Serbia) Novak Djokovic	(United States) Sebastian Korda	6–7^{(8–10)}, 7–6^{(7–3)}, 6–4
5.	Indian Wells Open	R4	Hard	Daniil Medvedev	(Germany) Alexander Zverev	6–7^{(5–7)}, 7–6^{(7–5)}, 7–5

== Retirements ==
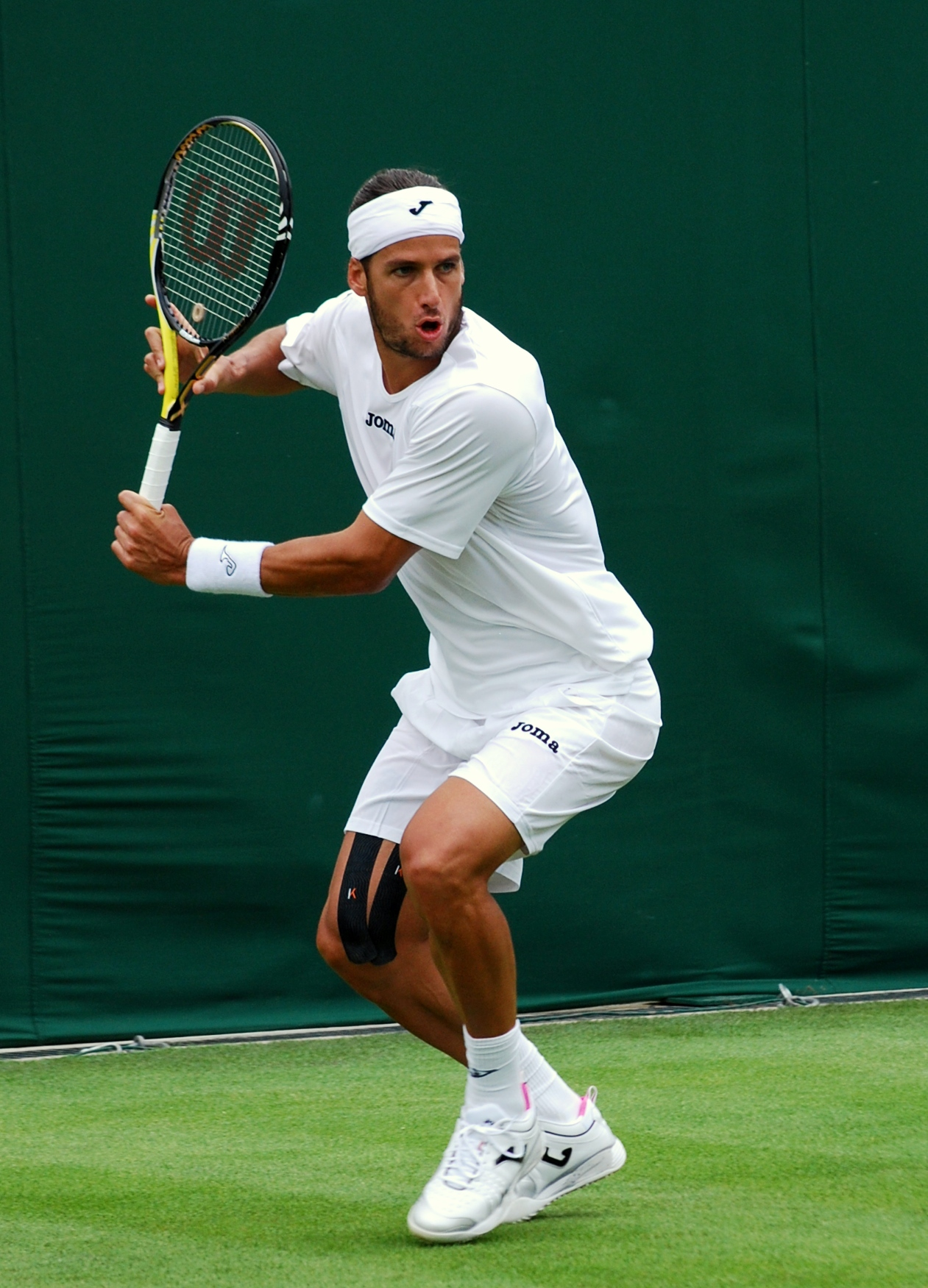
López (pictured in 2011) reached a career-high No. 12 in singles and No. 9 in doubles.

The following is a list of notable players (winners of a main tour title, and/or part of the ATP rankings top 100 in singles, or top 100 in doubles, for at least one week) who announced their retirement from professional tennis, became inactive (after not playing for more than 52 weeks), or were permanently banned from playing, during the 2023 season:

- (Spain) Pablo Andújar joined the professional tour in 2004 and reached career-high rankings of No. 32 in singles in July 2015 and No. 74 in doubles in November 2012. He won four singles titles. Andújar announced on Instagram in December 2022 that the 2023 season would be his last season on tour. He accepted a wildcard for the 2023 Barcelona Open Banc Sabadell and said farewell after his first round loss, hoping to play one more match at the home Challenger in Valencia.
- (Germany) Matthias Bachinger joined the professional tour in 2005 and reached a career-high ranking of No. 85 in singles in August 2011. In April 2023, Bachinger made his final professional appearance at the BMW Open, partnering Dominic Thiem in the doubles.
- (Brazil) Thomaz Bellucci joined the professional tour in 2005 and reached career-high rankings of No. 21 in singles in July 2010 and No. 70 in doubles in July 2013. He won four singles titles and one doubles title. On 12 January, Bellucci announced that he would make his final professional appearance at the Rio Open in February. He played Sebastián Báez in the first round and lost in straight sets.
- Juan Sebastián Cabal joined the professional tour in 2005 and reached a career-high ranking of No. 1 in doubles in July 2019. He won twenty career doubles titles. Cabal has been a Grand Slam champion three times, winning the 2019 Wimbledon Championships and 2019 US Open in men's doubles with Robert Farah, as well as the 2017 Australian Open in mixed doubles with Abigail Spears. He was supposed to retire from professional tennis after his participation at the 2023 Open Bogotá, but eventually withdrew due to a back injury. He will play his last match at the National Games of Colombia.
- (France) Jérémy Chardy joined the professional tour in 2005 and reached career-high rankings of No. 25 in singles in January 2013 and No. 24 in doubles in February 2020. He won one singles title and seven doubles titles. Chardy announced his retirement at the 2023 Wimbledon Championships on July 3.
- (Italy) Thomas Fabbiano joined the professional tour in 2005 and reached a career-high ranking of No. 70 in singles in September 2017. Fabbiano announced his retirement in March 2023.
- Robert Farah joined the professional tour in 2010 and reached a career-high ranking of No. 1 in doubles in July 2019. He won nineteen career doubles titles. Farah has been a Grand Slam champion two times, winning the 2019 Wimbledon Championships and 2019 US Open in men's doubles with Juan Sebastián Cabal. He was supposed to retire from professional tennis after his participation at the 2023 Open Bogotá, but eventually withdrew due to Cabal's back injury. He will play his last match at the National Games of Colombia.
- (United States) Bjorn Fratangelo joined the professional tour in 2012 and reached a career-high ranking of No. 99 in singles in June 2016. Fratangelo retired from professional tennis in August 2023.
- (Germany) Peter Gojowczyk joined the professional tour in 2006 and reached a career-high ranking of No. 39 in singles in June 2018. He won one career singles title. Gojowcyk announced his retirement from professional tennis on 6 November 2023 and made his final professional appearance at the 2023 Moselle Open.
- (Philippines) Treat Huey joined the professional tour in 2008 and reached a career-high ranking of No. 18 in doubles in July 2016. He won eight career doubles titles between 2012 and 2017, and produced his best Grand Slam performance at the 2016 Wimbledon Championships by reaching the semifinals with partner Max Mirnyi, the year in which they also qualified for the 2016 ATP Finals as the eighth-ranked team. Huey played his last professional doubles match at the 2023 Washington Open with partner Marcos Giron in the qualifying tournament, where he lost in the first round.
- (United States) John Isner joined the professional tour in 2007 and reached career-high rankings of No. 8 in singles in July 2018 and No. 14 in doubles in July 2022. He won 16 singles titles and eight doubles titles. Isner retired at the US Open.
- (Tunisia) Malek Jaziri joined the professional tour in 2003. He reached a career-high ranking of No. 42 in singles in January 2019 and No. 73 in August 2019. Jaziri announced he would retire at the Dubai Tennis Championships, where he lost in the first round to Alejandro Davidovich Fokina.
- (United States) Bradley Klahn joined the professional tour in 2012 and reached a career-high ranking of No. 63 in singles in March 2014. In August 2023, Klahn made his final professional appearance at the 2023 Golden Gate Open.
- (South Africa) Raven Klaasen joined the professional tour in 2002 and reached career-high rankings of No. 7 in doubles in August 2019. He won nineteen doubles titles. Klaasen retired from professional tennis in the season.
- (Poland) Łukasz Kubot joined the professional tour in 2002 and reached career-high rankings of No. 41 in singles in April 2010 and No. 1 in doubles in January 2018. He won 27 doubles titles, including two major titles at the 2014 Australian Open and 2017 Wimbledon Championships in men's doubles, both won while partnering Robert Lindstedt and Marcelo Melo respectfully. Kubot retired in this season.
- (Spain) Feliciano López joined the professional tour in 1997. López reached a career-high ranking of No. 12 in singles in March 2015 and has won seven singles titles across all three surfaces. He also reached his career-high ranking in doubles of No. 9 in November 2016 after winning his only major title, the 2016 French Open, with partner Marc López, and has won five additional doubles titles. López was also an integral part of the Spanish Davis Cup team and helped his country win four Davis Cup titles. In 2022, López made his record 79th consecutive Grand Slam appearance at the Australian Open and his 81st overall main draw Grand Slam appearance at Wimbledon, a record he shares with Roger Federer and Djokovic. In January, López announced that the 2023 season would be his last on the tour, and he made his final professional appearance at the Mallorca Championships, where he lost in the quarterfinals to Yannick Hanfmann.
- (China) Gong Maoxin joined the professional tour in 2006 and reached career-high rankings of No. 82 in doubles in March 2019. Maoxin retired from professional tennis in the season.
- (Italy) Alessandro Motti joined the professional tour in 2000 and reached career-high rankings of No. 91 in doubles in September 2009. Motti retired from professional tennis in the season.
- (Argentina) Guido Pella joined the professional tour in 2007. He reached a career-high ranking of No. 20 in singles in August 2019 and has won one singles title. In September 2023, Pella announced his retirement from professional tennis.
- (India) Purav Raja joined the professional tour in 2005 and reached career-high rankings of No. 52 in doubles in July 2017. He won two doubles titles. Raja retired from professional tennis in the season.
- (Canada) Adil Shamasdin joined the professional tour in 2001 and reached career-high rankings of No. 41 in doubles in June 2017. He won three doubles titles. Shamasdin retired from professional tennis in the season.
- (United States) Jack Sock joined the professional tour in 2011 and reached career-high rankings of No. 8 in singles in November 2017 and No. 2 in doubles in September 2018. He won four singles and 17 doubles titles, including three major doubles titles. Sock retired at the US Open.
- Pedro Sousa announced his retirement at the Oeiras Challenger 125 in April 2023. He played his last match against João Sousa at the Del Monte Lisboa Belém Open Challenger 75 in Portugal.
- (Japan) Yūichi Sugita joined the professional tour in 2006and reached a career-high ranking of No. 36 in singles in October 2017. He won one singles titles. In July 2023, Sugita announced his retirement from professional tennis.
- (Sweden) Mikael Ymer announced his retirement in August 2023.
- (China) Zhang Ze joined the professional tour in 2005 and reached career-high rankings of No. 78 in doubles in March 2019. Ze retired from professional tennis in the season after not playing for over a year.
- Nenad Zimonjić (born 4 June 1975 in Belgrade, Yugoslavia, (now Serbia)) joined the professional tour in 1995 and reached a career-high ranking of No. 176 in singles, in March 1999, and of No. 1 in doubles, in November 2008. He won 54 titles in doubles, including 3 major titles. He also won 5 major titles in mixed doubles. With Serbia he won 2010 Davis Cup as a player and 2020 ATP Cup as a captain. He played his last match during this season.

=== Inactivity ===
- (United States) Jenson Brooksby became inactive after missing the majority of the 2023 season due to surgery and receiving a provisional suspension.
- (Poland) Jerzy Janowicz became inactive after not playing for more than a year.
- (Poland) Kamil Majchrzak became inactive after missing the 2023 season due to receiving a provisional suspension.
- (Slovakia) Andrej Martin became inactive after missing the 2023 season due to receiving a provisional suspension.
- (Chile) Julio Peralta became inactive after not playing for more than a year.
- (Slovakia) Filip Polášek became inactive after not playing for more than a year.
- (Australia) Matt Reid became inactive after not playing for more than a year.
- (Croatia) Antonio Šančić became inactive after not playing for more than a year.
- (United States) Max Schnur became inactive after not playing for more than a year.
- Andrei Vasilevski became inactive after not playing for more than a year.

== Comebacks ==
The following is a list of notable players (winners of a main tour title, and/or part of the ATP rankings top 100 in singles, or top 100 in doubles, for at least one week) who returned from retirement during the 2023 season:

- (South Africa) Kevin Anderson returned to the tour at the 2023 Hall of Fame Open in July, after one year of absence.
- (United States) James Blake returned for one tournament at the M15 Rancho Santa Fe, California, partnering Hudson Rivera in the doubles event.
- (New Zealand) Marcus Daniell made a comeback to the tour in December 2023.
- Teymuraz Gabashvili returned to the tour after the expiration of his doping ban, competing in several ITF events beginning with the M15 Monastir in August 2023.
- (Slovakia) Martin Kližan made a comeback to the ITF Men's World Tennis Tour in December 2023, following two and a half years' retirement from the ATP Tour.
- (Japan) Kei Nishikori, having not played on tour since 2021, announced in April 2023 his plans to return in May–June at a Challenger level. In June, after close to two years off the ATP Tour, he returned at the Challenger 75 2023 Caribbean Open in Palmas Del Mar, Puerto Rico.
- (United States) Reilly Opelka returned to the tour at the 2023 Charlottesville Men's Pro Challenger in October.
- (Argentina) Guido Pella returned to the tour at the 2023 Australian Open after one year of absence.
- (Canada) Milos Raonic returned to the tour at the 2023 Libéma Open in June, after two years of absence.

== See also ==
- 2023 WTA Tour
- 2023 ATP Challenger Tour
- 2023 ITF Men's World Tennis Tour
