= 2023 Geneva Open =

ATP tennis tournament

- Date: 21-27 May
- Edition: 20th
- Category: ATP Tour 250
- Draw: 28S /16Q /16D
- Prize money: €562,815
- Surface: Clay
- Location: Geneva, Switzerland
- Venue: Tennis Club de Genève

Champions

Singles
- (Chile) Nicolás Jarry

Doubles
- (United Kingdom) Jamie Murray / (New Zealand) Michael Venus
- Geneva Open

The 2023 Gonet Geneva Open was an ATP 250 tennis tournament played on outdoor clay courts. It was the 20th edition of the Geneva Open and part of the ATP Tour 250 series of the 2023 ATP Tour. It took place at the Tennis Club de Genève in Geneva, Switzerland, from 21 to 27 May 2023.

== Champions ==
=== Singles ===
- (Chile) Nicolás Jarry def. (Bulgaria) Grigor Dimitrov, 7–6^{(7–1)}, 6–1

=== Doubles ===
- (United Kingdom) Jamie Murray / (New Zealand) Michael Venus def. (Spain) Marcel Granollers / (Argentina) Horacio Zeballos, 7–6^{(8–6)}, 7–6^{(7–3)}

== Points and prize money ==
=== Point distribution ===
Event	W	F	SF	QF	Round of 16	Round of 32	Q	Q2	Q1
Singles	250	150	90	45	20	0	12	6	0
Doubles	250	150	90	45	0	—N/a	—N/a	—N/a	—N/a

=== Prize money ===
Event	W	F	SF	QF	Round of 16	Round of 32	Q2	Q1
Singles	€85,605	€49,940	€29,355	€17,010	€9,880	€6,035	€3,020	€1,645
Doubles*	€29,740	€15,910	€9,330	€5,220	€3,070	—N/a	—N/a	—N/a

_{*per team}

== Singles main draw entrants ==
=== Seeds ===
Country	Player	Rank^{1}	Seed
NOR	Casper Ruud	4	1
USA	Taylor Fritz	9	2
GER	Alexander Zverev	22	3
BUL	Grigor Dimitrov	33	4
USA	Ben Shelton	35	5
NED	Tallon Griekspoor	36	6
ESP	Bernabé Zapata Miralles	38	7
FRA	Adrian Mannarino	45	8

- Rankings are as of 8 May 2023.

=== Other entrants ===
The following players received wildcards into the singles main draw:

- (Bulgaria) Grigor Dimitrov
- (France) Benoît Paire
- (Germany) Alexander Zverev

The following players received entry using a protected ranking into the singles main draw:

- (Bolivia) Hugo Dellien
- (Argentina) Guido Pella

The following players received entry from the qualifying draw:

- (Spain) Daniel Rincón
- (Ukraine) Vitaliy Sachko
- (Croatia) Nino Serdarušić
- (Italy) Stefano Travaglia

=== Withdrawals ===
- (United States) John Isner → replaced by (Bolivia) Hugo Dellien
- (France) Constant Lestienne → replaced by (United States) Christopher Eubanks
- (Canada) Denis Shapovalov → replaced by (Argentina) Guido Pella
- (Germany) Jan-Lennard Struff → replaced by (Italy) Marco Cecchinato
- (Netherlands) Botic van de Zandschulp → replaced by (Switzerland) Marc-Andrea Hüsler

== Doubles main draw entrants ==
=== Seeds ===
Country	Player	Country	Player	Rank^{1}	Seed
ESA	Marcelo Arévalo	NED	Jean-Julien Rojer	14	1
CRO	Nikola Mektić	CRO	Mate Pavić	19	2
ESP	Marcel Granollers	ARG	Horacio Zeballos	49	3
GBR	Jamie Murray	NZL	Michael Venus	58	4

- Rankings are as of 8 May 2023.

=== Other entrants ===
The following pairs received wildcards into the doubles main draw:

- (France) Arthur Cazaux / (France) Benoît Paire
- (Serbia) Ivan Sabanov / (Serbia) Matej Sabanov

=== Withdrawals ===
- (India) Rohan Bopanna / (Australia) Matthew Ebden → replaced by (Bolivia) Hugo Dellien / (Argentina) Guido Pella
- (Netherlands) Tallon Griekspoor / (Kazakhstan) Aleksandr Nedovyesov → replaced by (Ecuador) Diego Hidalgo / (United States) Ben Shelton
- (United States) Nathaniel Lammons / (United States) Jackson Withrow → replaced by (Serbia) Nikola Ćaćić / (United States) Nathaniel Lammons
- (Monaco) Hugo Nys / (Poland) Jan Zieliński → replaced by (Uruguay) Ariel Behar / (Brazil) Marcelo Demoliner
