= 2023 Barcelona Open Banc Sabadell =

- Date: 17–23 April
- Edition: 70th
- Category: ATP Tour 500
- Draw: 48S / 16D
- Prize money: €2,722,480
- Surface: Clay
- Location: Barcelona, Spain
- Venue: Real Club de Tenis Barcelona

Champions

Singles
- (Spain) Carlos Alcaraz

Doubles
- (Argentina) Máximo González / (Argentina) Andrés Molteni
- Barcelona Open

The 2023 Barcelona Open Banc Sabadell (also known as the Torneo Godó) was a men's tennis tournament currently played on outdoor clay courts at the Real Club de Tenis Barcelona in Barcelona, Spain, from 17 to 23 April 2023. It was the 70th edition of the event and part of the ATP Tour 500 series of the 2023 ATP Tour.

== Champions ==
=== Singles ===
- (Spain) Carlos Alcaraz def. (Greece) Stefanos Tsitsipas, 6–3, 6–4

=== Doubles ===
- (Argentina) Máximo González / (Argentina) Andrés Molteni def. (Netherlands) Wesley Koolhof / (United Kingdom) Neal Skupski 6–3, 6–7^{(8–10)}, [10–4]

== Points and prize money ==
=== Points distribution ===
Event	W	F	SF	QF	Round of 16	Round of 32	Round of 64	Q	Q2	Q1
Singles	500	300	180	90	45	20	0	10	4	0
Doubles	500	300	180	90	0	—N/a	—N/a	45	25	0

=== Prize money ===
Event	W	F	SF	QF	Round of 16	Round of 32	Round of 64	Q2	Q1
Singles	€477,795	€254,825	€132,190	€69,020	€36,365	€19,910	€10,615	€5,575	€3,185
Doubles*	€167,240	€89,190	€45,120	€22,560	€11,680	—N/a	—N/a	—N/a	—N/a

_{*per team}

== Singles main-draw entrants ==
=== Seeds ===
Country	Player	Rank^{1}	Seed
ESP	Carlos Alcaraz	2	1
GRE	Stefanos Tsitsipas	3	2
NOR	Casper Ruud	4	3
ITA	Jannik Sinner	8	4
USA	Frances Tiafoe	11	5
	Karen Khachanov	12	6
GBR	Cameron Norrie	14	7
AUS	Alex de Minaur	19	8
ITA	Lorenzo Musetti	21	9
ESP	Alejandro Davidovich Fokina	24	10
BUL	Grigor Dimitrov	25	11
GBR	Dan Evans	28	12
ESP	Roberto Bautista Agut	29	13
CAN	Denis Shapovalov	30	14
ARG	Francisco Cerúndolo	33	15
JPN	Yoshihito Nishioka	36	16

- ^{1} Rankings as of April 10, 2023.

=== Other entrants ===
The following players received wildcards into the main draw:

- (Spain) Pablo Andújar
- (Spain) Feliciano López
- (Spain) Daniel Rincón
- (Spain) Fernando Verdasco

The following player received entry using a protected ranking into the main draw:

- (Hungary) Attila Balázs

The following players received entry from the qualifying draw:

- (Italy) Matteo Arnaldi
- (Italy) Lorenzo Giustino
- Pavel Kotov
- (Slovakia) Jozef Kovalík
- (Ukraine) Oleksii Krutykh
- (Argentina) Marco Trungelliti

=== Withdrawals ===
- (Spain) Pablo Carreño Busta → replaced by (Hungary) Attila Balázs
- (United States) Sebastian Korda → replaced by (Ecuador) Emilio Gómez
- Daniil Medvedev → replaced by (Spain) Pedro Martínez
- (Spain) Rafael Nadal → replaced by Alexander Shevchenko
- (United States) Brandon Nakashima → replaced by (Argentina) Tomás Martín Etcheverry
- (Sweden) Mikael Ymer → replaced by (Italy) Francesco Passaro

== Doubles main-draw entrants ==
=== Seeds ===
Country	Player	Country	Player	Rank^{1}	Seed
NED	Wesley Koolhof	GBR	Neal Skupski	2	1
USA	Rajeev Ram	GBR	Joe Salisbury	7	2
CRO	Nikola Mektić	CRO	Mate Pavić	13	3
CRO	Ivan Dodig	USA	Austin Krajicek	19	4

- Rankings are as of April 10, 2023.

=== Other entrants ===
The following pairs received wildcards into the doubles main draw:

- (Italy) Simone Bolelli / (Spain) Marcel Granollers
- (Spain) Jaume Munar / (Spain) Albert Ramos Viñolas

The following pair received entry from the qualifying draw:

- (Argentina) Máximo González / (Argentina) Andrés Molteni

=== Withdrawals ===
- (Spain) Marcel Granollers / (Argentina) Horacio Zeballos → replaced by (Brazil) Rafael Matos / (Spain) David Vega Hernández
