= 2023 BMW Open – Doubles =

Doubles
- 2023 BMW Open

Final
- Champions: (Austria) Alexander Erler (Austria) Lucas Miedler
- Runners-up: (Germany) Kevin Krawietz (Germany) Tim Pütz
- Score: 6–3, 6–4

Events
| Singles | Doubles |
| ← 2022 · | BMW Open | · 2024 → |

Alexander Erler and Lucas Miedler defeated the defending champion Kevin Krawietz and his partner Tim Pütz in the final, 6–3, 6–4 to win the doubles tennis title at the 2023 Bavarian International Tennis Championships.

Krawietz and Andreas Mies were the reigning champions, but Mies chose to defend his title in Barcelona instead.

== Seeds ==
1. (Germany) Kevin Krawietz / (Germany) Tim Pütz (final)
2. (Colombia) Juan Sebastián Cabal / (Colombia) Robert Farah (first round)
3. (United States) Nathaniel Lammons / (United States) Jackson Withrow (first round)
4. (Brazil) Marcelo Melo / (Australia) John Peers (first round)

== Draw ==
=== Key ===
- Q = Qualifier
- WC = Wild card
- LL = Lucky loser
- Alt = Alternate
- SE = Special exempt
- PR = Protected ranking
- ITF = ITF entry
- JE = Junior exempt
- w/o = Walkover
- r = Retired
- d = Defaulted
- SR = Special ranking

=== Draw ===
First round
1 | (Germany) K Krawietz (Germany) T Pütz | 6 | 6
Alt | (Germany) Y Hanfmann (Germany) D Masur | 0 | 3
WC | (Germany) O Otte (Germany) J-L Struff | 6 | 3 | [10]
(United Kingdom) J Cash (United Kingdom) H Patten | 4 | 6 | [5]
4 | (Brazil) M Melo (Australia) J Peers | 6^{3} | 3
Alt | (Australia) C O'Connell (France) A Olivetti | 7^{7} | 6
(Netherlands) R Haase (Austria) P Oswald | 6 | 6
WC | (Germany) M Bachinger (Austria) D Thiem | 4 | 2
PR | (France) J Chardy (France) U Humbert | 6 | 3 | [8]
(Jamaica) D Brown (Czech Republic) A Pavlásek | 3 | 6 | [10]
(India) Y Bhambri (India) S Myneni | 6 | 7^{7}
3 | (United States) N Lammons (United States) J Withrow | 3 | 6^{4}
(Argentina) G Andreozzi (Argentina) G Durán | 2 | 4
(Austria) A Erler (Austria) L Miedler | 6 | 6
(France) Q Halys (Netherlands) D Pel | 6 | 6
2 | (Colombia) JS Cabal (Colombia) R Farah | 1 | 2

Quarterfinals
1 | (Germany) K Krawietz (Germany) T Pütz | 7 | 6
WC | (Germany) O Otte (Germany) J-L Struff | 5 | 4
Alt | (Australia) C O'Connell (France) A Olivetti | 4 | 5
(Netherlands) R Haase (Austria) P Oswald | 6 | 7
(Jamaica) D Brown (Czech Republic) A Pavlásek | 2^{r}
(India) Y Bhambri (India) S Myneni | 5
(Austria) A Erler (Austria) L Miedler | 6 | 6^{7} | [10]
(France) Q Halys (Netherlands) D Pel | 4 | 7^{9} | [7]

Semifinals
1 | (Germany) K Krawietz (Germany) T Pütz | 7^{10} | 6
(Netherlands) R Haase (Austria) P Oswald | 6^{8} | 2
(India) Y Bhambri (India) S Myneni | 6^{4} | 3
(Austria) A Erler (Austria) L Miedler | 7^{7} | 6

Final
1 | (Germany) K Krawietz (Germany) T Pütz | 3 | 4
(Austria) A Erler (Austria) L Miedler | 6 | 6
