= 2023 Geneva Open – Singles =

Singles
- 2023 Geneva Open

Final
- Champion: (Chile) Nicolás Jarry
- Runner-up: (Bulgaria) Grigor Dimitrov
- Score: 7–6^{(7–1)}, 6–1

Details
- Draw: 28 (4 Q / 3 WC )
- Seeds: 8

Events
Singles	Doubles
← 2022 ·	Geneva Open	· 2024 →

Nicolás Jarry defeated Grigor Dimitrov in the final, 7–6^{(7–1)}, 6–1 to win the singles tennis title at the 2023 Geneva Open.

Casper Ruud was the two-time defending champion, but was defeated in the quarterfinals by Jarry.

== Seeds ==
The top four seeds receive a bye into the second round.

1. (Norway) Casper Ruud (quarterfinals)
2. (United States) Taylor Fritz (semifinals)
3. (Germany) Alexander Zverev (semifinals)
4. (Bulgaria) Grigor Dimitrov (final)
5. (United States) Ben Shelton (first round)
6. (Netherlands) Tallon Griekspoor (second round, withdrew)
7. (Spain) Bernabé Zapata Miralles (second round, retired)
8. (France) Adrian Mannarino (second round)

== Draw ==
=== Key ===
- Q = Qualifier
- WC = Wild card
- LL = Lucky loser
- Alt = Alternate
- SE = Special exempt
- PR = Protected ranking
- ITF = ITF entry
- JE = Junior exempt
- w/o = Walkover
- r = Retired
- d = Defaulted
- SR = Special ranking

=== Finals ===
Semifinals
(Chile) Nicolás Jarry	7^{7}	6
3/WC	(Germany) Alexander Zverev	6^{3}	3
4/WC	(Bulgaria) Grigor Dimitrov	3	7	7^{7}
2	(United States) Taylor Fritz	6	5	6^{2}

Final
(Chile) Nicolás Jarry	7^{7}	6
4/WC	(Bulgaria) Grigor Dimitrov	6^{1}	1

=== Top half ===
First round
PR	(Bolivia) H Dellien	4	2
(United States) JJ Wolf	6	6
(Chile) N Jarry	6	6
(Serbia) D Lajović	4	2
Q	(Italy) S Travaglia	5	6^{3}
6	(Netherlands) T Griekspoor	7	7^{7}
(United States) C Eubanks	7^{7}	6
WC	(France) B Paire	6^{2}	3
(China) Y Wu	6	4	7^{8}
(Switzerland) M-A Hüsler	4	6	6^{6}
(Italy) M Cecchinato	7	2	6
5	(United States) B Shelton	5	6	2

Second round
1	(Norway) C Ruud	6	7
(United States) JJ Wolf	3	5
(Chile) N Jarry	w/o
6	(Netherlands) T Griekspoor
3/WC	(Germany) A Zverev	6	6
(United States) C Eubanks	2	3
(China) Y Wu	7^{7}	6
(Italy) M Cecchinato	6^{5}	3

Quarterfinals
1	(Norway) C Ruud	6	6^{2}	5
(Chile) N Jarry	3	7^{7}	7
3/WC	(Germany) A Zverev	4
(China) Y Wu	1^{r}

Semifinals
(Chile) N Jarry	7^{7}	6
3/WC	(Germany) A Zverev	6^{3}	3

=== Bottom half ===
First round
7	(Spain) B Zapata Miralles	6	6
Q	(Ukraine) V Sachko	2	4
Q	(Croatia) N Serdarušić	6^{5}	7^{7}	1
(Australia) C O'Connell	7^{7}	6^{1}	6
Q	(Spain) D Rincón	4	6	0
(Spain) R Carballés Baena	6	4	6
8	(France) A Mannarino	7	6
(Serbia) F Krajinović	5	1
PR	(Argentina) G Pella	4	5
I Ivashka	6	7
(Kazakhstan) A Bublik	0	4
(United States) M Giron	6	6

Second round
7	(Spain) B Zapata Miralles	0	0^{r}
(Australia) C O'Connell	6	3
(Spain) R Carballés Baena	1	4
4/WC	(Bulgaria) G Dimitrov	6	6
8	(France) A Mannarino	4	6	3
I Ivashka	6	4	6
(United States) M Giron	6	2	3
2	(United States) T Fritz	4	6	6

Quarterfinals
(Australia) C O'Connell	7^{7}	5	4
4/WC	(Bulgaria) G Dimitrov	6^{5}	7	6
I Ivashka	1	2
2	(United States) T Fritz	6	6

Semifinals
4/WC	(Bulgaria) G Dimitrov	3	7	7^{7}
2	(United States) T Fritz	6	5	6^{2}

== Qualifying ==
=== Seeds ===
1. (Brazil) Thiago Monteiro (qualifying competition)
2. (France) Arthur Cazaux (qualifying competition)
3. (Italy) Alessandro Giannessi (qualifying competition)
4. (Jordan) Abdullah Shelbayh (first round)
5. (Czech Republic) Marek Gengel (first round)
6. (Ukraine) Vitaliy Sachko (qualified)
7. (Italy) Salvatore Caruso (first round)
8. (Germany) Elmar Ejupovic (first round)

=== Qualifiers ===
1. (Spain) Daniel Rincón
2. (Croatia) Nino Serdarušić
3. (Ukraine) Vitaliy Sachko
4. (Italy) Stefano Travaglia

=== Qualifying draw ===
==== First qualifier ====
First round
1	(Brazil) Thiago Monteiro	6	6
(Spain) Fernando Verdasco	2	2
(Spain) Daniel Rincón	6	5	6
7	(Italy) Salvatore Caruso	4	7	2

Qualifying competition
1	(Brazil) Thiago Monteiro	6	4	3
(Spain) Daniel Rincón	3	6	6

==== Second qualifier ====
First round
2/WC	(France) Arthur Cazaux	7^{7}	6^{5}	6
WC	(Switzerland) Jérôme Kym	6^{2}	7^{7}	4
(Croatia) Nino Serdarušić	6	6
5	(Czech Republic) Marek Gengel	1	4

Qualifying competition
2/WC	(France) Arthur Cazaux	4	6	6^{10}
(Croatia) Nino Serdarušić	6	4	7^{12}

==== Third qualifier ====
First round
3	(Italy) Alessandro Giannessi	3	6	6
(Kazakhstan) Denis Yevseyev	6	4	2
Alt	(Ukraine) Illya Marchenko	5	2
6	(Ukraine) Vitaliy Sachko	7	6

Qualifying competition
3	(Italy) Alessandro Giannessi	5	2
6	(Ukraine) Vitaliy Sachko	7	6

==== Fourth qualifier ====
First round
4	(Jordan) Abdullah Shelbayh	1	1
(Italy) Stefano Travaglia	6	6
(Norway) Viktor Durasovic	4	6	6
8	(Germany) Elmar Ejupovic	6	2	3

Qualifying competition
(Italy) Stefano Travaglia	6	6
(Norway) Viktor Durasovic	4	2
