= 2023 Barcelona Open Banc Sabadell – Doubles =

Doubles
- 2023 Barcelona Open Banc Sabadell

Final
- Champions: (Argentina) Máximo González (Argentina) Andrés Molteni
- Runners-up: (Netherlands) Wesley Koolhof (United Kingdom) Neal Skupski
- Score: 6–3, 6–7^{(8–10)}, [10–4]

Events
Singles	Doubles
← 2022 ·	Barcelona Open Banc Sabadell	· 2024 →

Máximo González and Andrés Molteni defeated Wesley Koolhof and Neal Skupski in the final, 6–3, 6–7^{(8–10)}, [10–4] to win the doubles tennis title at the 2023 Barcelona Open.

Kevin Krawietz and Andreas Mies were the reigning champions, but Krawietz chose to defend his title in Munich instead. Mies partnered with Matwé Middelkoop, but lost in the first round to Nicolas Mahut and Stefanos Tsitsipas.

== Seeds ==
1. (Netherlands) Wesley Koolhof / (United Kingdom) Neal Skupski (final)
2. (United States) Rajeev Ram / (United Kingdom) Joe Salisbury (quarterfinals)
3. (El Salvador) Marcelo Arévalo / (Netherlands) Jean-Julien Rojer (first round)
4. (Croatia) Nikola Mektić / (Croatia) Mate Pavić (first round)

== Draw ==
=== Key ===
- Q = Qualifier
- WC = Wild card
- LL = Lucky loser
- Alt = Alternate
- ITF = ITF entry
- PR = Protected ranking
- SR = Special ranking
- SE = Special exempt
- JE = Junior exempt
- JR = Junior Accelerator Programme entrant
- CO = College Accelerator Programme entrant
- NG = Next Gen Accelerator Program entrant
- w/o = Walkover
- r = Retired
- d = Defaulted

=== Draw ===
First Round
1	(Netherlands) W Koolhof (United Kingdom) N Skupski	7^{7}	6
WC	(Italy) S Bolelli (Spain) M Granollers	6^{3}	2
(Netherlands) M Middelkoop (Germany) A Mies	6^{2}	4
(France) N Mahut (Greece) S Tsitsipas	7^{7}	6
4	(Croatia) N Mektić (Croatia) M Pavić	6^{4}	6	[8]
(India) R Bopanna (Australia) M Ebden	7^{7}	3	[10]
(Australia) A de Minaur (Italy) J Sinner	4	6^{3}
(Mexico) S González (France) É Roger-Vasselin	6	7^{7}
WC	(Spain) J Munar (Spain) A Ramos Viñolas	1	6^{6}
Q	(Argentina) M González (Argentina) A Molteni	6	7^{8}
(Brazil) R Matos (Spain) D Vega Hernández	6	6
3	(El Salvador) M Arévalo (Netherlands) J-J Rojer	4	4
(United Kingdom) L Glasspool (Finland) H Heliövaara	2	7^{7}	[10]
(Monaco) H Nys (Poland) J Zieliński	6	6^{5}	[0]
(Croatia) I Dodig (United States) A Krajicek	3	4
2	(United States) R Ram (United Kingdom) J Salisbury	6	6

Quarterfinals
1	(Netherlands) W Koolhof (United Kingdom) N Skupski	6	3	[10]
(France) N Mahut (Greece) S Tsitsipas	4	6	[7]
(India) R Bopanna (Australia) M Ebden	6	6
(Mexico) S González (France) É Roger-Vasselin	2	4
Q	(Argentina) M González (Argentina) A Molteni	6	6
(Brazil) R Matos (Spain) D Vega Hernández	4	2
(United Kingdom) L Glasspool (Finland) H Heliövaara	7^{9}	7
2	(United States) R Ram (United Kingdom) J Salisbury	6^{7}	5

Semifinals
1	(Netherlands) W Koolhof (United Kingdom) N Skupski	6	7
(India) R Bopanna (Australia) M Ebden	4	5
Q	(Argentina) M González (Argentina) A Molteni	7	4	[10]
(United Kingdom) L Glasspool (Finland) H Heliövaara	5	6	[7]

Final
1	(Netherlands) W Koolhof (United Kingdom) N Skupski	3	7^{10}	[4]
Q	(Argentina) M González (Argentina) A Molteni	6	6^{8}	[10]

== Qualifying ==
=== Seeds ===
1. (Argentina) Máximo González / (Argentina) Andrés Molteni (qualified)
2. (United Kingdom) Dan Evans / (United Kingdom) Jonny O'Mara (first round)

=== Qualifiers ===
1. (Argentina) Máximo González / (Argentina) Andrés Molteni

=== Qualifying draw ===
First round
1	(Argentina) Máximo González (Argentina) Andrés Molteni	3	6	[10]
(Spain) Pedro Martínez (Japan) Yoshihito Nishioka	6	3	[4]
WC	(Spain) Íñigo Cervantes (Spain) Oriol Roca Batalla	4	7	[10]
2	(United Kingdom) Dan Evans (United Kingdom) Jonny O'Mara	6	5	[4]

Qualifying competition
1	(Argentina) Máximo González (Argentina) Andrés Molteni	7^{8}	6^{7}	[10]
WC	(Spain) Íñigo Cervantes (Spain) Oriol Roca Batalla	6^{6}	7^{9}	[8]
