= 2023 Geneva Open – Doubles =

Doubles
- 2023 Geneva Open

Final
- Champions: (United Kingdom) Jamie Murray (New Zealand) Michael Venus
- Runners-up: (Spain) Marcel Granollers (Argentina) Horacio Zeballos
- Score: 7–6^{(8–6)}, 7–6^{(7–3)}

Events
Singles	Doubles
- Geneva Open

Jamie Murray and Michael Venus defeated Marcel Granollers and Horacio Zeballos in the final, 7–6^{(8–6)}, 7–6^{(7–3)} to win the doubles tennis title at the 2023 Geneva Open.

Nikola Mektić and Mate Pavić were the defending champions, but lost in the quarterfinals to Simone Bolelli and Fabrice Martin.

== Seeds ==
1. (El Salvador) Marcelo Arévalo / (Netherlands) Jean-Julien Rojer (semifinals)
2. (Croatia) Nikola Mektić / (Croatia) Mate Pavić (quarterfinals)
3. (Spain) Marcel Granollers / (Argentina) Horacio Zeballos (final)
4. (United Kingdom) Jamie Murray / (New Zealand) Michael Venus (champions)

== Draw ==
Key

- Q = Qualifier
- WC = Wild card
- LL = Lucky loser
- Alt = Alternate
- ITF = ITF entry
- PR = Protected ranking
- SR = Special ranking
- SE = Special exempt
- JE = Junior exempt
- JR = Junior Accelerator Programme entrant
- CO = College Accelerator Programme entrant
- NG = Next Gen Accelerator Program entrant
- w/o = Walkover
- r = Retired
- d = Defaulted

=== Draw ===
First round
1	(El Salvador) M Arévalo (Netherlands) J-J Rojer	6	6
(Brazil) M Melo (Australia) J Peers	3	4
(Serbia) N Ćaćić (United States) N Lammons	7^{7}	6
(Germany) A Mies (Spain) D Vega Hernández	6^{2}	1
3	(Spain) M Granollers (Argentina) H Zeballos	6	6
(Uruguay) A Behar (Brazil) M Demoliner	2	2
PR	(Bolivia) H Dellien (Argentina) G Pella	3	6	[10]
WC	(Serbia) I Sabanov (Serbia) M Sabanov	6	4	[3]
(Austria) A Erler (Austria) L Miedler	5	6	[10]
(Ecuador) D Hidalgo (United States) B Shelton	7	4	[8]
(Spain) R Carballés Baena (Spain) B Zapata Miralles	3	2
4	(United Kingdom) J Murray (New Zealand) M Venus	6	6
WC	(France) A Cazaux (France) B Paire	2	2
(Italy) S Bolelli (France) F Martin	6	6
(United Kingdom) J Cash (United Kingdom) H Patten	6^{4}	3
2	(Croatia) N Mektić (Croatia) M Pavić	7^{7}	6

Quarterfinals
1	(El Salvador) M Arévalo (Netherlands) J-J Rojer	7^{7}	6
(Serbia) N Ćaćić (United States) N Lammons	6^{3}	2
3	(Spain) M Granollers (Argentina) H Zeballos	6	6
PR	(Bolivia) H Dellien (Argentina) G Pella	0	3
(Austria) A Erler (Austria) L Miedler	4	1
4	(United Kingdom) J Murray (New Zealand) M Venus	6	6
(Italy) S Bolelli (France) F Martin	6	6
2	(Croatia) N Mektić (Croatia) M Pavić	4	3

Semifinals
1	(El Salvador) M Arévalo (Netherlands) J-J Rojer	4	5
3	(Spain) M Granollers (Argentina) H Zeballos	6	7
4	(United Kingdom) J Murray (New Zealand) M Venus	6	3	[10]
(Italy) S Bolelli (France) F Martin	1	6	[6]

Final
3	(Spain) M Granollers (Argentina) H Zeballos	6^{6}	6^{3}
4	(United Kingdom) J Murray (New Zealand) M Venus	7^{8}	7^{7}
