= 2023 Novak Djokovic tennis season =

- Full name: Novak Djokovic
- Country: Serbia
- Calendar prize money: $15,952,044

Singles
- Season record: 56–7
- Calendar titles: 7
- Year-end ranking: No. 1
- Ranking change from previous year: ▲4

Grand Slam & significant results
- Australian Open: W
- French Open: W
- Wimbledon: F
- US Open: W
- Other tournaments
- Tour Finals: W

Doubles
- Season record: 1–4
- Year-end ranking: –

Davis Cup
- Davis Cup: SF

The 2023 Novak Djokovic tennis season is considered one of the greatest tennis seasons of all time by an individual tennis player. It began on 1 January 2023, with the start of the Adelaide International, and ended 25 November 2023 after Serbia's defeat by Italy in the semifinals of the Davis Cup Finals.

During this season, Djokovic:

- Extended his men's record of 373 weeks & surpassed Steffi Graf's (all-gender) record of 377 weeks as world No. 1 to 405 (as of 25 December 2023).
- Surpassed Rafael Nadal's record of 22 men's singles major titles at the French Open and then won a record-extending 24th major at the US Open.
- Extended his record of 32 Grand Slam men's singles finals to 36.
- Surpassed Roger Federer's record of 46 Grand Slam men's singles semifinals to 47.
- Became first player to achieve the triple career Grand Slam in men's singles. (Previously tied with Roy Emerson, Rod Laver, and Nadal for the double career Grand Slam)
- Became the first man to win at least three singles majors on each of the three surfaces. (Previously tied with Mats Wilander and Nadal for two majors on each of the three surfaces)
- Improved his record of most singles match wins at each of the four majors to 88 or more.
- Surpassed Federer's record of six ATP Finals singles titles to seven.
- Extended his record of 38 Masters singles titles to 40.
- Extended his record of 56 Masters singles finals to 58.
- Extended his Open Era men's singles record of the highest career winning percentage (minimum 500 wins) from 83.35% to 83.62% (1087–213).
- Extended his Open Era record of 240 wins over top 10 ranked men's singles players to 257.
- Extended his record of 347 (previously tied with Federer) matches played against top 10 ranked men's singles players to 369.
- Extended his record of seven year-end No. 1 men's singles ranking finishes to eight.

== Yearly summary ==
=== Early hard court season ===
==== Adelaide International ====
Djokovic reached the final without dropping a set, then defeated Sebastian Korda in the final, 6–7^{(8–10)}, 7–6^{(7–3)}, 6–4, saving a championship point in the second set. It was Djokovic's 92nd career title, and the first time he won a title in Adelaide since 2007.

==== Australian Open ====
Djokovic defeated Stefanos Tsitsipas in the final, 6–3, 7–6^{(7–4)}, 7–6^{(7–5)}, to win his 10th Australian Open title and 22nd major overall, equaling Nadal's all-time record. He only lost one set during the tournament (to Enzo Couacaud in the second round).

==== Dubai Tennis Championships ====
The World No. 1 was on a roll, extending his winning streak to 15 matches before losing to eventual champion Daniil Medvedev in the semifinals of the Dubai Tennis Championships.

==== Indian Wells and Miami Opens ====
In March, Djokovic withdrew from the Indian Wells Masters and Miami Open after being denied a visa into the United States due to being unvaccinated. Indian Wells tournament director Tommy Haas, Miami Open tournament director James Blake, and Florida Governor Ron DeSantis had lobbied federal government officials for an exemption, but were unsuccessful.

=== Clay court season ===
==== Monte-Carlo Masters ====
Despite leading 6–4, 4–2, two-time champion Djokovic was upset in the round of 16 by Lorenzo Musetti, who came back to win the match 4–6, 7–5, 6–4 for his first ever win against a reigning World No. 1 and first ever win against Djokovic.

==== Srpska Open ====
Djokovic was upset in the quarterfinals 4–6, 6–7^{(6–8)} by compatriot and eventual champion Dusan Lajovic. Djokovic squandered 15 of 16 break point chances and a 6–3 lead in the second set tiebreak.

==== Madrid Open ====
Djokovic withdrew from Madrid Open due to concerns over an elbow injury.

==== Italian Open ====
In his final event before his 36th birthday, defending champion Djokovic reached the quarterfinals for the 17th straight year. In the quarterfinals, following a one-hour rain delay at the end of the second set, Djokovic was defeated by eventual runner-up Holger Rune 6–2, 4–6, 6–2. It was Djokovic's earliest loss in Rome since 2013.

==== French Open ====
After defeating world No. 1 Carlos Alcaraz in the semifinals, Djokovic defeated Casper Ruud in the final, 7–6^{(7–1)}, 6–3, 7–5 to win the men's singles tennis title at the 2023 French Open, an all-time record-breaking 23rd men's singles major. He became the first man to achieve a triple career Grand Slam, and became the oldest French Open champion at the age of 36 years and 20 days.

=== Grass court season ===
==== Wimbledon ====
Djokovic then played at the Wimbledon Championships, where he was bidding to win a fifth consecutive title and a record-equalling eighth title. He reached the semifinals with straight-set victories over Pedro Cachin, Jordan Thompson and Stan Wawrinka, and four set victories over Hubert Hurkacz and Andrey Rublev. In the semifinals, he faced Jannik Sinner in a rematch of their quarterfinal epic the previous year, and Djokovic won in straight sets to reach his fifth consecutive and 9th overall Wimbledon final, as well as his record-extending 35th major final, where he faced Carlos Alcaraz. He subsequently lost an epic final to Alcaraz in five sets, ending his 34-match winning streak at Wimbledon since 2018 and his unbeaten run in both Wimbledon finals and Centre Court matches since his 2013 defeat to Andy Murray.

=== American outdoor hardcourt season ===
==== Cincinnati Open ====
This was Djokovic's first tournament in the United States since the 2021 US Open, following the lifting of COVID-19 vaccination requirements for international air travelers in May 2023. In the third round, Djokovic defeated Gaël Monfils in straight sets to extend his perfect head-to-head record to a record-breaking 19–0 (thus overtaking the previous record hold by Rafael Nadal against Richard Gasquet at 18–0). Djokovic then defeated ninth seed Taylor Fritz and 16th seed Alexander Zverev in straight sets to reach his record-extending 57th Masters 1000 final, doing so without the loss of a set.

In yet another epic final, Djokovic avenged his Wimbledon loss by beating Carlos Alcaraz, 5–7, 7–6^{(9–7)}, 7–6^{(7–4)} to win his third Cincinnati Masters title and record-extending 39th ATP Tour Masters 1000 title overall. He won the match from a set down and down a break in the second set, along with saving a championship point in the second-set tiebreaker. It was the second time he saved a championship point en route to a title in 2023, following his triumph in Adelaide, and it was his ninth career title that he won after saving match points during a tournament. At 3 hours and 49 minutes, this match was the longest best-of-three-sets ATP Tour final and the longest match in the tournament's history. The final between Carlos Alcaraz and Novak Djokovic was later named the ATP Match of the Year. Djokovic called it one of his toughest matches, and said "It did feel like a Grand Slam final, even more than that to be honest". He compared the intensity and toughness of the match to his match against Rafael Nadal in the 2012 Australian Open final.

==== US Open ====
Djokovic then played at the US Open where he dropped only two sets en route to the title, both to his fellow countryman Laslo Djere in a win from two sets down in the third round. In the quarterfinals, Djokovic defeated No. 9 Taylor Fritz to record his 250th career victory over a Top 10 player, making him the first player to accomplish this milestone since the ATP rankings began in 1973. By reaching a 47th men's singles major semifinal, Djokovic surpassed Roger Federer's Open Era record. By reaching the final, Djokovic matched Federer's record of reaching all major finals in a season three times.

In the final, he faced Daniil Medvedev in a rematch of their 2021 US Open final, where Medvedev had triumphed in straight sets for his first major title and to deny Djokovic the Grand Slam. This time, Djokovic defeated Medvedev in straight sets to win his fourth US Open title and a record-extending 24th men's singles major title overall, also equaling Margaret Court's all-time record of major singles titles by either sex. Djokovic became the oldest US Open men's singles champion in the Open Era, at 36 years and 111 days, and the first man to win three majors in a season four times. This triumph also meant that, at the time, Djokovic had won one third of all Grand Slams he had entered (24 out of 72), and had been in the final in half of all Grand Slams he had played (36 out of 72). By winning his first-round match, Djokovic reclaimed the world No. 1 position from Alcaraz at the end of the tournament.

=== European indoor hard court season ===
==== Paris Masters ====
After a six-week break, Djokovic returned to the tour at the Paris Masters, where he won his second-round match over Tomás Martín Etcheverry in his 1069th career match, surpassing Rafael Nadal for the fourth most in the Open Era. In the quarterfinals, Djokovic defeated defending champion Holger Rune in a rematch of the previous year's final. He went on to defeat Grigor Dimitrov in the final to win his record-extending seventh Paris Masters title and 40th Masters overall. Djokovic also played in the doubles event with Krajinovic as a warm-up for the upcoming Davis Cup Finals. They won in the first round, but withdrew the next round.

==== ATP Finals ====
Djokovic was put in the green group along with Stefanos Tsitsipas, Jannik Sinner and Holger Rune. By winning his first round robin match over Rune, he secured the year-end world No. 1 position for a record-extending eighth time. Djokovic then lost to Sinner in a third set tiebreaker, which ended his 19-match winning streak and marked his first loss since the Wimbledon final. Djokovic rebounded quickly, however, and played some of his best tennis of the season to defeat second seed Alcaraz in the semifinals and home favourite Sinner in the final—both in straight sets—to win a record-breaking seventh ATP Finals title. This victory saw him become the first current world No. 1 to win the event since Andy Murray in 2016. Despite playing only 12 tournaments, Djokovic led the tour in titles won with seven, the most he has claimed in a season since 2016. On 20 November, Djokovic became the first player in singles to reach 400 weeks at No. 1.

==== Davis Cup Finals ====
its place in the Davis Cup Final 8 in Malaga in November.

Djokovic played in his final event of the year at the 2023 Davis Cup Finals in December. He had helped Serbia reach the quarterfinals by winning his 20th consecutive Davis Cup singles match against Alejandro Davidovich Fokina in a 3–0 win over Spain in Group C, where they finished in second place. In the quarterfinals against Britain, Djokovic defeated Cameron Norrie in singles to take his nation to the semifinals for the second time in three years and become the outright most successful Serbian player in the history of the Davis Cup with 44 wins in the competition, moving him one ahead of Nenad Zimonjić.

In the semifinals against Italy, Djokovic faced Sinner for the third time in 11 days, losing in three sets despite holding three consecutive match points. This was his first loss in a Davis Cup singles match since he had retired to Juan Martín del Potro in 2011, and his first loss in a completed match since 2009. This was also the fourth time he lost from match points up and the first time that he lost after failing to convert three consecutive match points. Djokovic then teamed up with Miomir Kecmanovic for the decisive doubles match, but lost to Lorenzo Sonego and Sinner, who thus became the first player to ever defeat him twice in the same day.

== All matches ==
This table chronicles all the matches of Novak Djokovic in 2023.

Key
W	F	SF	QF	#R	RR	Q#	P#	DNQ	A	Z#	PO	G	S	B	NMS	NTI	P	NH

(W) winner; (F) finalist; (SF) semifinalist; (QF) quarterfinalist; (#R) rounds 4, 3, 2, 1; (RR) round-robin stage; (Q#) qualification round; (P#) preliminary round; (DNQ) did not qualify; (A) absent; (Z#) Davis/Fed Cup Zonal Group (with number indication) or (PO) play-off; (G) gold, (S) silver or (B) bronze Olympic/Paralympic medal; (NMS) not a Masters tournament; (NTI) not a Tier I tournament; (P) postponed; (NH) not held; (SR) strike rate (events won / competed); (W–L) win–loss record.
To avoid confusion and double counting, these charts are updated at the conclusion of a tournament or when the player's participation has ended.

=== Singles matches ===
Tournament	Match	Round	Opponent (seed or key)	Rank	Result	Score
Adelaide International; Adelaide, Australia; ATP 250; Hard, outdoor 1 – 8 January 2023
Adelaide International; Adelaide, Australia; ATP 250; Hard, outdoor 1 – 8 January 2023	1 / 1238	1R	(France) Constant Lestienne	65	Win	6–3, 6–2
Adelaide International; Adelaide, Australia; ATP 250; Hard, outdoor 1 – 8 January 2023	2 / 1239	2R	(France) Quentin Halys	64	Win	7–6^{(7–3)}, 7–6^{(7–5)}
Adelaide International; Adelaide, Australia; ATP 250; Hard, outdoor 1 – 8 January 2023	3 / 1240	QF	(Canada) Denis Shapovalov (7)	18	Win	6–3, 6–4
Adelaide International; Adelaide, Australia; ATP 250; Hard, outdoor 1 – 8 January 2023	4 / 1241	SF	Daniil Medvedev (3)	7	Win	6–3, 6–4
Adelaide International; Adelaide, Australia; ATP 250; Hard, outdoor 1 – 8 January 2023	5 / 1242	W	(United States) Sebastian Korda	33	Win (1)	6–7^{(8–10)}, 7–6^{(7–3)}, 6–4
Australian Open; Melbourne, Australia; Grand Slam tournament Hard, outdoor 16 – 29 January 2023
Australian Open; Melbourne, Australia; Grand Slam tournament Hard, outdoor 16 – 29 January 2023	6 / 1243	1R	(Spain) Roberto Carballés Baena	75	Win	6–3, 6–4, 6–0
Australian Open; Melbourne, Australia; Grand Slam tournament Hard, outdoor 16 – 29 January 2023	7 / 1244	2R	(France) Enzo Couacaud (Q)	191	Win	6–1, 6–7^{(5–7)}, 6–2, 6–0
Australian Open; Melbourne, Australia; Grand Slam tournament Hard, outdoor 16 – 29 January 2023	8 / 1245	3R	(Bulgaria) Grigor Dimitrov (27)	28	Win	7–6^{(9–7)}, 6–3, 6–4
Australian Open; Melbourne, Australia; Grand Slam tournament Hard, outdoor 16 – 29 January 2023	9 / 1246	4R	(Australia) Alex de Minaur (22)	24	Win	6–2, 6–1, 6–2
Australian Open; Melbourne, Australia; Grand Slam tournament Hard, outdoor 16 – 29 January 2023	10 / 1247	QF	Andrey Rublev (5)	6	Win	6–1, 6–2, 6–4
Australian Open; Melbourne, Australia; Grand Slam tournament Hard, outdoor 16 – 29 January 2023	11 / 1248	SF	(United States) Tommy Paul	35	Win	7–5, 6–1, 6–2
Australian Open; Melbourne, Australia; Grand Slam tournament Hard, outdoor 16 – 29 January 2023	12 / 1249	W	(Greece) Stefanos Tsitsipas (3)	4	Win (2)	6–3, 7–6^{(7–4)}, 7–6^{(7–5)}
Dubai Tennis Championships; Dubai, United Arab Emirates; ATP 500; Hard, outdoor 27 February – 4 March 2023
Dubai Tennis Championships; Dubai, United Arab Emirates; ATP 500; Hard, outdoor 27 February – 4 March 2023	13 / 1250	1R	(Czech Republic) Tomáš Macháč (Q)	130	Win	6–3, 3–6, 7–6^{(7–1)}
Dubai Tennis Championships; Dubai, United Arab Emirates; ATP 500; Hard, outdoor 27 February – 4 March 2023	14 / 1251	2R	(Netherlands) Tallon Griekspoor	39	Win	6–2, 6–3
Dubai Tennis Championships; Dubai, United Arab Emirates; ATP 500; Hard, outdoor 27 February – 4 March 2023	15 / 1252	QF	(Poland) Hubert Hurkacz (5)	11	Win	6–3, 7–5
Dubai Tennis Championships; Dubai, United Arab Emirates; ATP 500; Hard, outdoor 27 February – 4 March 2023	16 / 1253	SF	Daniil Medvedev (3)	7	Loss	4–6, 4–6
Indian Wells Open; Indian Wells, United States; ATP 1000; Hard, outdoor 8 – 19 March 2023
Indian Wells Open; Indian Wells, United States; ATP 1000; Hard, outdoor 8 – 19 March 2023	–					N/A
Miami Open; Miami Gardens, United States; ATP 1000; Hard, outdoor 22 March – 2 April 2023
Miami Open; Miami Gardens, United States; ATP 1000; Hard, outdoor 22 March – 2 April 2023	–					N/A
Monte-Carlo Masters; Roquebrune-Cap-Martin, France; ATP 1000; Clay, outdoor 9 – 16 April 2023
Monte-Carlo Masters; Roquebrune-Cap-Martin, France; ATP 1000; Clay, outdoor 9 – 16 April 2023	–	1R	Bye			
Monte-Carlo Masters; Roquebrune-Cap-Martin, France; ATP 1000; Clay, outdoor 9 – 16 April 2023	17 / 1254	2R	Ivan Gakhov (Q)	198	Win	7–6^{(7–5)}, 6–2
Monte-Carlo Masters; Roquebrune-Cap-Martin, France; ATP 1000; Clay, outdoor 9 – 16 April 2023	18 / 1255	3R	(Italy) Lorenzo Musetti (16)	21	Loss	6–4, 5–7, 4–6
Srpska Open; Banja Luka, Bosnia and Herzegovina; ATP 250; Clay, outdoor 17 – 23 April 2023
Srpska Open; Banja Luka, Bosnia and Herzegovina; ATP 250; Clay, outdoor 17 – 23 April 2023	–	1R	Bye			
Srpska Open; Banja Luka, Bosnia and Herzegovina; ATP 250; Clay, outdoor 17 – 23 April 2023	19 / 1256	2R	(France) Luca Van Assche	87	Win	6–7^{(4–7)}, 6–3, 6–2
Srpska Open; Banja Luka, Bosnia and Herzegovina; ATP 250; Clay, outdoor 17 – 23 April 2023	20 / 1257	QF	(Serbia) Dušan Lajović	70	Loss	4–6, 6–7^{(6–8)}
Madrid Open; Madrid, Spain; ATP 1000; Clay, outdoor 26 April – 7 May 2023
Madrid Open; Madrid, Spain; ATP 1000; Clay, outdoor 26 April – 7 May 2023	Withdrew					
Italian Open; Rome, Italy; ATP 1000; Clay, outdoor 10 – 21 May 2023
Italian Open; Rome, Italy; ATP 1000; Clay, outdoor 10 – 21 May 2023	–	1R	Bye			
Italian Open; Rome, Italy; ATP 1000; Clay, outdoor 10 – 21 May 2023	21 / 1258	2R	(Argentina) Tomás Martín Etcheverry	61	Win	7–6^{(7–5)}, 6–2
Italian Open; Rome, Italy; ATP 1000; Clay, outdoor 10 – 21 May 2023	22 / 1259	3R	(Bulgaria) Grigor Dimitrov (26)	33	Win	6–3, 4–6, 6–1
Italian Open; Rome, Italy; ATP 1000; Clay, outdoor 10 – 21 May 2023	23 / 1260	4R	(United Kingdom) Cameron Norrie (13)	13	Win	6–3, 6–4
Italian Open; Rome, Italy; ATP 1000; Clay, outdoor 10 – 21 May 2023	24 / 1261	QF	(Denmark) Holger Rune (7)	7	Loss	2–6, 6–4, 2–6
French Open; Paris, France; Grand Slam tournament Clay, outdoor 28 May – 11 June 2023
French Open; Paris, France; Grand Slam tournament Clay, outdoor 28 May – 11 June 2023	25 / 1262	1R	(United States) Aleksandar Kovacevic	114	Win	6–3, 6–2, 7–6^{(7–1)}
French Open; Paris, France; Grand Slam tournament Clay, outdoor 28 May – 11 June 2023	26 / 1263	2R	(Hungary) Márton Fucsovics	83	Win	7–6^{(7–2)}, 6–0, 6–3
French Open; Paris, France; Grand Slam tournament Clay, outdoor 28 May – 11 June 2023	27 / 1264	3R	(Spain) Alejandro Davidovich Fokina (29)	34	Win	7–6^{(7–4)}, 7–6^{(7–5)}, 6–2
French Open; Paris, France; Grand Slam tournament Clay, outdoor 28 May – 11 June 2023	28 / 1265	4R	(Peru) Juan Pablo Varillas	94	Win	6–3, 6–2, 6–2
French Open; Paris, France; Grand Slam tournament Clay, outdoor 28 May – 11 June 2023	29 / 1266	QF	Karen Khachanov (11)	11	Win	4–6, 7–6^{(7–0)}, 6–2, 6–4
French Open; Paris, France; Grand Slam tournament Clay, outdoor 28 May – 11 June 2023	30 / 1267	SF	(Spain) Carlos Alcaraz (1)	1	Win	6–3, 5–7, 6–1, 6–1
French Open; Paris, France; Grand Slam tournament Clay, outdoor 28 May – 11 June 2023	31 / 1268	W	(Norway) Casper Ruud (4)	4	Win (3)	7–6^{(7–1)}, 6–3, 7–5
Wimbledon; London, United Kingdom; Grand Slam tournament Grass, outdoor 3 – 16 July 2023
Wimbledon; London, United Kingdom; Grand Slam tournament Grass, outdoor 3 – 16 July 2023	32 / 1269	1R	(Argentina) Pedro Cachin	68	Win	6–3, 6–3, 7–6^{(7–4)}
Wimbledon; London, United Kingdom; Grand Slam tournament Grass, outdoor 3 – 16 July 2023	33 / 1270	2R	(Australia) Jordan Thompson	70	Win	6–3, 7–6^{(7–4)}, 7–5
Wimbledon; London, United Kingdom; Grand Slam tournament Grass, outdoor 3 – 16 July 2023	34 / 1271	3R	(Switzerland) Stan Wawrinka	88	Win	6–3, 6–1, 7–6^{(7–5)}
Wimbledon; London, United Kingdom; Grand Slam tournament Grass, outdoor 3 – 16 July 2023	35 / 1272	4R	(Poland) Hubert Hurkacz (17)	18	Win	7–6^{(8–6)}, 7–6^{(8–6)}, 5–7, 6–4
Wimbledon; London, United Kingdom; Grand Slam tournament Grass, outdoor 3 – 16 July 2023	36 / 1273	QF	Andrey Rublev (7)	7	Win	4–6, 6–1, 6–4, 6–3
Wimbledon; London, United Kingdom; Grand Slam tournament Grass, outdoor 3 – 16 July 2023	37 / 1274	SF	(Italy) Jannik Sinner (8)	8	Win	6–3, 6–4, 7–6^{(7–4)}
Wimbledon; London, United Kingdom; Grand Slam tournament Grass, outdoor 3 – 16 July 2023	38 / 1275	F	(Spain) Carlos Alcaraz (1)	1	Loss (1)	6–1, 6–7^{(6–8)}, 1–6, 6–3, 4–6
Canadian Open; Montreal, Canada; ATP 1000; Hard, outdoor 7 – 13 August 2023
Canadian Open; Montreal, Canada; ATP 1000; Hard, outdoor 7 – 13 August 2023	Withdrew					
Cincinnati Open; Cincinnati, United States; ATP 1000; Hard, outdoor 13 – 20 August 2023
Cincinnati Open; Cincinnati, United States; ATP 1000; Hard, outdoor 13 – 20 August 2023	–	1R	Bye			
Cincinnati Open; Cincinnati, United States; ATP 1000; Hard, outdoor 13 – 20 August 2023	39 / 1276	2R	(Spain) Alejandro Davidovich Fokina	23	Win	6–4, 0–0 ret.
Cincinnati Open; Cincinnati, United States; ATP 1000; Hard, outdoor 13 – 20 August 2023	40 / 1277	3R	(France) Gaël Monfils (PR)	211	Win	6–3, 6–2
Cincinnati Open; Cincinnati, United States; ATP 1000; Hard, outdoor 13 – 20 August 2023	41 / 1278	QF	(United States) Taylor Fritz (9)	9	Win	6–0, 6–4
Cincinnati Open; Cincinnati, United States; ATP 1000; Hard, outdoor 13 – 20 August 2023	42 / 1279	SF	(Germany) Alexander Zverev (16)	17	Win	7–6^{(7–5)}, 7–5
Cincinnati Open; Cincinnati, United States; ATP 1000; Hard, outdoor 13 – 20 August 2023	43 / 1280	W	(Spain) Carlos Alcaraz (1)	1	Win (4)	5–7, 7–6^{(9–7)}, 7–6^{(7–4)}
US Open; New York City, United States; Grand Slam tournament Hard, outdoor 28 August – 10 September 2023
US Open; New York City, United States; Grand Slam tournament Hard, outdoor 28 August – 10 September 2023	44 / 1281	1R	(France) Alexandre Müller	84	Win	6–0, 6–2, 6–3
US Open; New York City, United States; Grand Slam tournament Hard, outdoor 28 August – 10 September 2023	45 / 1282	2R	(Spain) Bernabé Zapata Miralles	76	Win	6–4, 6–1, 6–1
US Open; New York City, United States; Grand Slam tournament Hard, outdoor 28 August – 10 September 2023	46 / 1283	3R	(Serbia) Laslo Djere (32)	38	Win	4–6, 4–6, 6–1, 6–1, 6–3
US Open; New York City, United States; Grand Slam tournament Hard, outdoor 28 August – 10 September 2023	47 / 1284	4R	(Croatia) Borna Gojo (Q)	105	Win	6–2, 7–5, 6–4
US Open; New York City, United States; Grand Slam tournament Hard, outdoor 28 August – 10 September 2023	48 / 1285	QF	(United States) Taylor Fritz (9)	9	Win	6–1, 6–4, 6–4
US Open; New York City, United States; Grand Slam tournament Hard, outdoor 28 August – 10 September 2023	49 / 1286	SF	(United States) Ben Shelton	47	Win	6–3, 6–2, 7–6^{(7–4)}
US Open; New York City, United States; Grand Slam tournament Hard, outdoor 28 August – 10 September 2023	50 / 1287	W	Daniil Medvedev (3)	3	Win (5)	6–3, 7–6^{(7–5)}, 6–3
Davis Cup Finals; Group stage Valencia, Spain; Davis Cup; Hard, indoor 12–17 September 2023
Davis Cup Finals; Group stage Valencia, Spain; Davis Cup; Hard, indoor 12–17 September 2023	51 / 1288	RR	(Spain) Alejandro Davidovich Fokina	25	Win	6–3, 6–4
Shanghai Masters; Shanghai, China; ATP 1000; Hard, outdoor 4 – 15 October 2023
Shanghai Masters; Shanghai, China; ATP 1000; Hard, outdoor 4 – 15 October 2023	Withdrew					
Paris Masters; Paris, France; ATP 1000; Hard, indoor 30 October – 5 November 2023
Paris Masters; Paris, France; ATP 1000; Hard, indoor 30 October – 5 November 2023	–	1R	Bye			
Paris Masters; Paris, France; ATP 1000; Hard, indoor 30 October – 5 November 2023	52 / 1289	2R	(Argentina) Tomás Martín Etcheverry	31	Win	6–3, 6–2
Paris Masters; Paris, France; ATP 1000; Hard, indoor 30 October – 5 November 2023	53 / 1290	3R	(Netherlands) Tallon Griekspoor	23	Win	4–6, 7–6^{(7–2)}, 6–4
Paris Masters; Paris, France; ATP 1000; Hard, indoor 30 October – 5 November 2023	54 / 1291	QF	(Denmark) Holger Rune (6)	7	Win	7–5, 6–7^{(3–7)}, 6–4
Paris Masters; Paris, France; ATP 1000; Hard, indoor 30 October – 5 November 2023	55 / 1292	SF	Andrey Rublev (5)	5	Win	5–7, 7–6^{(7–3)}, 7–5
Paris Masters; Paris, France; ATP 1000; Hard, indoor 30 October – 5 November 2023	56 / 1293	W	(Bulgaria) Grigor Dimitrov	17	Win (6)	6–4, 6–3
ATP Finals; Turin, Italy; ATP Finals; Hard, indoor 12 – 19 November 2023
ATP Finals; Turin, Italy; ATP Finals; Hard, indoor 12 – 19 November 2023	57 / 1294	RR	(Denmark) Holger Rune (8)	8	Win	7–6^{(7–4)}, 6–7^{(1–7)}, 6–3
ATP Finals; Turin, Italy; ATP Finals; Hard, indoor 12 – 19 November 2023	58 / 1295	RR	(Italy) Jannik Sinner (4)	4	Loss	5–7, 7–6^{(7–5)}, 6–7^{(2–7)}
ATP Finals; Turin, Italy; ATP Finals; Hard, indoor 12 – 19 November 2023	59 / 1296	RR	(Poland) Hubert Hurkacz (Alt)	9	Win	7–6^{(7–1)}, 4–6, 6–1
ATP Finals; Turin, Italy; ATP Finals; Hard, indoor 12 – 19 November 2023	60 / 1297	SF	(Spain) Carlos Alcaraz (2)	2	Win	6–3, 6–2
ATP Finals; Turin, Italy; ATP Finals; Hard, indoor 12 – 19 November 2023	61 / 1298	W	(Italy) Jannik Sinner (4)	4	Win (7)	6–3, 6–3
Davis Cup Finals; Knockout stage Málaga, Spain; Davis Cup; Hard, indoor 21 – 26 November 2023
Davis Cup Finals; Knockout stage Málaga, Spain; Davis Cup; Hard, indoor 21 – 26 November 2023	62 / 1299	QF	(United Kingdom) Cameron Norrie	18	Win	6–4, 6–4
Davis Cup Finals; Knockout stage Málaga, Spain; Davis Cup; Hard, indoor 21 – 26 November 2023	63 / 1300	SF	(Italy) Jannik Sinner	4	Loss	2–6, 6–2, 5–7

=== Doubles matches ===
Tournament	Match	Round	Opponents (seed or key)	Ranks	Result	Score
Adelaide International; Adelaide, Australia; ATP 250; Hard, outdoor 1 – 8 January 2023; Partner: (Canada) Vasek Pospisil
Adelaide International; Adelaide, Australia; ATP 250; Hard, outdoor 1 – 8 January 2023; Partner: (Canada) Vasek Pospisil	1 / 139	1R	(Bosnia and Herzegovina) Tomislav Brkić / (Ecuador) Gonzalo Escobar	58 / 40	Loss	6–4, 3–6, [5–10]
Cincinnati Open; Cincinnati, United States; ATP 1000; Hard, outdoor 13 – 20 August 2023; Partner: (Serbia) Nikola Ćaćić
Cincinnati Open; Cincinnati, United States; ATP 1000; Hard, outdoor 13 – 20 August 2023; Partner: (Serbia) Nikola Ćaćić	2 / 140	1R	(United Kingdom) Jamie Murray / (New Zealand) Michael Venus	31 / 26	Loss	4–6, 2–6
Davis Cup Finals; Group stage Valencia, Spain; Davis Cup; Hard, indoor 12–17 September 2023; Partner: (Serbia) Nikola Ćaćić
Davis Cup Finals; Group stage Valencia, Spain; Davis Cup; Hard, indoor 12–17 September 2023; Partner: (Serbia) Nikola Ćaćić	3 / 141	RR	(Czech Republic) Tomáš Macháč / (Czech Republic) Adam Pavlásek	– / 57	Loss	5–7, 7–6^{(9–7)}, [3–10]
Paris Masters; Paris, France; ATP 1000; Hard, indoor 30 October – 5 November 2023; Partner: (Serbia) Miomir Kecmanović
Paris Masters; Paris, France; ATP 1000; Hard, indoor 30 October – 5 November 2023; Partner: (Serbia) Miomir Kecmanović	4 / 142	1R	(Ecuador) Gonzalo Escobar / (Kazakhstan) Aleksandr Nedovyesov	57 / 47	Win	6–4, 6–2
Paris Masters; Paris, France; ATP 1000; Hard, indoor 30 October – 5 November 2023; Partner: (Serbia) Miomir Kecmanović	–	2R	(India) Rohan Bopanna / (Australia) Matthew Ebden (3)	8 / 7	walkover	N/A
Davis Cup Finals; Knockout stage Málaga, Spain; Davis Cup; Hard, indoor 21–26 November 2023; Partner: (Serbia) Dušan Lajović (vs. Great Britain); (Serbia) Miomir Kecmanović (vs. Italy)
Davis Cup Finals; Knockout stage Málaga, Spain; Davis Cup; Hard, indoor 21–26 November 2023; Partner: (Serbia) Dušan Lajović (vs. Great Britain); (Serbia) Miomir Kecmanović (vs. Italy)	–	RR	(United Kingdom) Joe Salisbury / (United Kingdom) Neal Skupski	7 / 9	not played	N/A
Davis Cup Finals; Knockout stage Málaga, Spain; Davis Cup; Hard, indoor 21–26 November 2023; Partner: (Serbia) Dušan Lajović (vs. Great Britain); (Serbia) Miomir Kecmanović (vs. Italy)	5 / 143	SF	(Italy) Jannik Sinner / (Italy) Lorenzo Sonego	500 / 243	Loss	3–6, 4–6

== Exhibition matches ==
=== Singles ===
Tournament	Match	Round	Opponent (seed or key)	Rank	Result	Score
World Tennis League; Dubai, United Arab Emirates Hard, outdoor 19 – 24 December 2022
World Tennis League; Dubai, United Arab Emirates Hard, outdoor 19 – 24 December 2022	1	PO	(Germany) Alexander Zverev	12	Loss	3–6, 4–6
World Tennis League; Dubai, United Arab Emirates Hard, outdoor 19 – 24 December 2022	2	PO	(Austria) Sebastian Ofner	193	Win	6–7^{(5–7)}, 6–0, [10–7]
The Arena Showdown; Melbourne, Australia Hard, outdoor 13 January 2023
The Arena Showdown; Melbourne, Australia Hard, outdoor 13 January 2023	3	PO	(Australia) Nick Kyrgios	21	Loss	3–4^{(3–5)}, 4–2, [9–10]
Hurlingham Tennis Classic; London, United Kingdom Grass, outdoor 27 June – 1 July 2023
Hurlingham Tennis Classic; London, United Kingdom Grass, outdoor 27 June – 1 July 2023	4	PO	(United States) Frances Tiafoe	10	Win	6–3, 3–6, [10–7]

== Schedule ==
Per Novak Djokovic, this is his current 2023 schedule (subject to change).

=== Singles schedule ===
Date	Tournament	Location	Tier	Surface	Prev. result	Prev. points	New points	Result
1 January 2023– 8 January 2023	Adelaide International 1	Adelaide (AUS)	250 Series	Hard	N/A	0	250	Champion (defeated Sebastian Korda, 6–7^{(8–10)}, 7–6^{(7–3)}, 6–4)
16 January 2023– 29 January 2023	Australian Open	Melbourne (AUS)	Grand Slam	Hard	N/A	0	2,000	Champion (defeated Stefanos Tsitsipas, 6–3, 7–6^{(7–4)}, 7–6^{(7–5)})
27 February 2023– 4 March 2023	Dubai Tennis Championships	Dubai (UAE)	500 Series	Hard	QF	90	180	Semifinals (lost to Daniil Medvedev, 4–6, 4–6)
9 April 2023– 16 April 2023	Monte-Carlo Masters	Roquebrune-Cap-Martin (FRA)	Masters 1000	Clay	2R	10	90	Third round (lost to Lorenzo Musetti, 6–4, 5–7, 4–6)
N/A	Serbia Open	Belgrade (SRB)	250 Series	Clay	F	150	0	Not Held
17 April 2023– 23 April 2023	Srpska Open	Banja Luka (BIH)	250 Series	Clay	N/A	0	45	Quarterfinals (lost to Dušan Lajović, 4–6, 6–7^{(6–8)})
26 April 2023– 7 May 2023	Madrid Open	Madrid (ESP)	Masters 1000	Clay	SF	360	0	Withdrew
10 May 2023– 21 May 2023	Italian Open	Rome (ITA)	Masters 1000	Clay	W	1,000	180	Quarterfinals (lost to Holger Rune, 2–6, 6–4, 2–6)
28 May 2023– 11 June 2023	French Open	Paris (FRA)	Grand Slam	Clay	QF	360	2,000	Champion (defeated Casper Ruud, 7–6^{(7–1)}, 6–3, 7–5)
3 July 2023– 17 July 2023	Wimbledon	London (UK)	Grand Slam	Grass	W	0 (Note: Removal Of ATP Rankings Points From 2022 Wimbledon.)	1,200	Final (lost to Carlos Alcaraz, 6–1, 6–7^{(6–8)}, 1–6, 6–3, 4–6)
7 August 2023– 14 August 2023	Canadian Open	Montreal (CAN)	Masters 1000	Hard	A	0	0	Withdrew
14 August 2023– 21 August 2023	Cincinnati Open	Cincinnati (USA)	Masters 1000	Hard	A	0	1000	Champion (defeated Carlos Alcaraz, 5–7, 7–6^{(9–7)}, 7–6^{(7–4)})
28 August 2023– 10 September 2023	US Open	New York (USA)	Grand Slam	Hard	A	0	2000	Champion (defeated Daniil Medvedev, 6–3, 7–6^{(7–5)}, 6–3)
11 September 2023– 17 September 2023	Davis Cup Finals Group stage	Valencia (ESP)	Davis Cup	Hard (i)	N/A	N/A	N/A	Progressed to finals knockout stage
25 September 2023– 1 October 2023	Astana Open	Astana (KAZ)	250 Series	Hard (i)	W	500	0	Withdrew
4 October 2023– 15 October 2023	Shanghai Masters	Shanghai (CHN)	Masters 1000	Hard	N/A	0	0	Withdrew
30 October 2023– 5 November 2023	Paris Masters	Paris (FRA)	Masters 1000	Hard (i)	F	600	1000	Champion (defeated Grigor Dimitrov, 6–4, 6–3)
6 November 2023– 12 November 2023	Tel Aviv Open	Tel Aviv (ISR)	250 Series	Hard (i)	W	250	0	Cancelled due to the ongoing Gaza war
12 November 2023– 19 November 2023	ATP Finals	Turin (ITA)	Tour Finals	Hard (i)	W	1500	1300	Champion (defeated Jannik Sinner, 6–3, 6–3)
21 November 2023– 26 November 2023	Davis Cup Finals Knockout stage	Málaga (ESP)	Davis Cup	Hard (i)	N/A	N/A	N/A	Semifinals ( Serbia lost to Italy, 1–2)
Total year-end points						4820	11245	▲6425 difference

=== Doubles schedule ===
Date	Tournament	Location	Tier	Surface	Prev. result	Prev. points	New points	Result
1 January 2023– 8 January 2023	Adelaide International 1	Adelaide (AUS)	250 Series	Hard	N/A	0	0	1R (lost to Tomislav Brkić / Gonzalo Escobar, 6–4, 3–6, [5–10])
14 August 2023– 21 August 2023	Cincinnati Masters	Cincinnati (USA)	Masters 1000	Hard	N/A	0	0	1R (lost to Jamie Murray / Michael Venus, 4–6, 2–6)
11 September 2023– 17 September 2023	Davis Cup Finals Group stage	Valencia (ESP)	Davis Cup	Hard (i)	N/A	N/A	N/A	Progressed to finals knockout stage
30 October 2023– 5 November 2023	Paris Masters	Paris (FRA)	Masters 1000	Hard (i)	N/A	0	0	2R (walkout to Rohan Bopanna / Matthew Ebden)
21 November 2023– 26 November 2023	Davis Cup Finals Knockout stage	Málaga (ESP)	Davis Cup	Hard (i)	N/A	N/A	N/A	Semifinals ( Serbia lost to Italy, 1–2)
Total year-end points						0	0	0 difference

== Yearly records ==
=== Head-to-head matchups ===
Novak Djokovic has a 56–7 ATP match win–loss record in the 2023 season. His record against players who were part of the ATP rankings Top Ten at the time of their meetings is 17–5. Bold indicates player was ranked top 10 at the time of at least one meeting. The following list is ordered by number of wins:

- (Spain) Alejandro Davidovich Fokina 3–0
- (Bulgaria) Grigor Dimitrov 3–0
- (Poland) **Hubert Hurkacz** 3–0
- **Andrey Rublev** 3–0
- (Spain) **Carlos Alcaraz** 3–1
- (Argentina) Tomás Martín Etcheverry 2–0
- (United States) **Taylor Fritz** 2–0
- (Netherlands) Tallon Griekspoor 2–0
- (United Kingdom) Cameron Norrie 2–0
- **Daniil Medvedev** 2–1
- (Denmark) **Holger Rune** 2–1
- (Italy) **Jannik Sinner** 2–2
- (Argentina) Pedro Cachin 1–0
- (Spain) Roberto Carballés Baena 1–0
- (France) Enzo Couacaud 1–0
- (Serbia) Laslo Djere 1–0
- (Australia) Alex de Minaur 1–0
- (Hungary) Márton Fucsovics 1–0
- Ivan Gakhov 1–0
- (Croatia) Borna Gojo 1–0
- (France) Quentin Halys 1–0
- Karen Khachanov 1–0
- (United States) Sebastian Korda 1–0
- (United States) Aleksandar Kovacevic 1–0
- (France) Constant Lestienne 1–0
- (Czech Republic) Tomáš Macháč 1–0
- (Spain) Bernabé Zapata Miralles 1–0
- (France) Gaël Monfils 1–0
- (France) Alexandre Müller 1–0
- (United States) Tommy Paul 1–0
- (Norway) **Casper Ruud** 1–0
- (Canada) Denis Shapovalov 1–0
- (United States) Ben Shelton 1–0
- (Australia) Jordan Thompson 1–0
- (Greece) **Stefanos Tsitsipas** 1–0
- (France) Luca Van Assche 1–0
- (Peru) Juan Pablo Varillas 1–0
- (Switzerland) Stan Wawrinka 1–0
- (Germany) Alexander Zverev 1–0
- (Serbia) Dušan Lajović 0–1
- (Italy) Lorenzo Musetti 0–1

* Statistics correct as of 25 November 2023.

=== Finals ===
==== Singles: 8 (7 titles, 1 runner-up) ====
Category Grand Slam (3–1) ATP Finals (1–0) Masters 1000 (2–0) 500 Series (0–0) 250 Series (1–0)	Titles by surface Hard (6–0) Clay (1–0) Grass (0–1)	Titles by setting Outdoor (5–1) Indoor (2–0)

Result	W–L	Date	Tournament	Tier	Surface	Opponent	Score
Win	1–0	Jan 2023	Adelaide International 1, Australia	250 Series	Hard	(United States) Sebastian Korda	6–7^{(8–10)}, 7–6^{(7–3)}, 6–4
Win	2–0	Jan 2023	Australian Open, Australia	Grand Slam	Hard	(Greece) Stefanos Tsitsipas	6–3, 7–6^{(7–4)}, 7–6^{(7–5)}
Win	3–0	Jun 2023	French Open, France	Grand Slam	Clay	(Norway) Casper Ruud	7–6^{(7–1)}, 6–3, 7–5
Loss	3–1	Jul 2023	Wimbledon, United Kingdom	Grand Slam	Grass	(Spain) Carlos Alcaraz	6–1, 6–7^{(6–8)}, 1–6, 6–3, 4–6
Win	4–1	Aug 2023	Cincinnati Masters, United States	Masters 1000	Hard	(Spain) Carlos Alcaraz	5–7, 7–6^{(9–7)}, 7–6^{(7–4)}
Win	5–1	Sep 2023	US Open, United States	Grand Slam	Hard	Daniil Medvedev	6–3, 7–6^{(7–5)}, 6–3
Win	6–1	Nov 2023	Paris Masters, France	Masters 1000	Hard (i)	(Bulgaria) Grigor Dimitrov	6–4, 6–3
Win	7–1	Nov 2023	ATP Finals, Italy	Tour Finals	Hard (i)	(Italy) Jannik Sinner	6–3, 6–3

=== Top 10 wins (17–5) ===
Category Grand Slam (8–1) ATP Finals (4–1) Masters 1000 (4–1) 500 Series (0–1) 250 Series (1–0) Davis Cup (0–1)	Wins by surface Hard (13–3) Clay (2–1) Grass (2–1)	Wins by setting Outdoor (11–3) Indoor (6–2)

#	Player	Rank	Event	Surface	Rd	Score	NDR
1/241	Daniil Medvedev	7	Adelaide International 1, Australia	Hard	SF	6–3, 6–4	5
2/242	Andrey Rublev	6	Australian Open, Australia	Hard	QF	6–1, 6–2, 6–4	5
3/243	(Greece) Stefanos Tsitsipas	4	Australian Open, Australia	Hard	F	6–3, 7–6^{(7–4)}, 7–6^{(7–5)}	5
4/244	(Spain) Carlos Alcaraz	1	French Open, France	Clay	SF	6–3, 5–7, 6–1, 6–1	3
5/245	(Norway) Casper Ruud	4	French Open, France	Clay	F	7–6^{(7–1)}, 6–3, 7–5	3
6/246	Andrey Rublev	7	Wimbledon, UK	Grass	QF	4–6, 6–1, 6–4, 6–3	2
7/247	(Italy) Jannik Sinner	8	Wimbledon, UK	Grass	SF	6–3, 6–4, 7–6^{(7–4)}	2
8/248	(United States) Taylor Fritz	9	Cincinnati Masters, USA	Hard	QF	6–0, 6–4	2
9/249	(Spain) Carlos Alcaraz	1	Cincinnati Masters, USA	Hard	F	5–7, 7–6^{(9–7)}, 7–6^{(7–4)}	2
10/250	(United States) Taylor Fritz	9	US Open, USA	Hard	QF	6–1, 6–4, 6–4	2
11/251	Daniil Medvedev	3	US Open, USA	Hard	F	6–3, 7–6^{(7–5)}, 6–3	2
12/252	(Denmark) Holger Rune	7	Paris Masters, France	Hard (i)	QF	7–5, 6–7^{(3–7)}, 6–4	**1**
13/253	Andrey Rublev	6	Paris Masters, France	Hard (i)	SF	5–7, 7–6^{(7–3)}, 7–5	**1**
14/254	(Denmark) Holger Rune	8	ATP Finals, Turin, Italy	Hard (i)	RR	7–6^{(7–4)}, 6–7^{(1–7)}, 6–3	**1**
15/255	(Poland) Hubert Hurkacz	9	ATP Finals, Turin, Italy	Hard (i)	RR	7–6^{(7–1)}, 4–6, 6–1	**1**
16/256	(Spain) Carlos Alcaraz	2	ATP Finals, Turin, Italy	Hard (i)	SF	6–3, 6–2	**1**
17/257	(Italy) Jannik SInner	4	ATP Finals, Turin, Italy	Hard (i)	F	6–3, 6–3	**1**

=== Earnings ===
- **Bold** font denotes tournament win

**Singles**
Event	Prize money	Year-to-date
**Adelaide International 1**	**$94,560**	$94,560
**Australian Open**	**A$2,975,000**	$2,169,622
Dubai Tennis Championships	$153,125	$2,322,747
Monte-Carlo Masters	€77,760	$2,407,482
Srpska Open	€17,010	$2,426,179
Italian Open	€161,525	$2,604,148
**French Open**	**€2,300,000**	$5,070,668
Wimbledon Championships	£1,175,000	$6,562,330
**Cincinnati Masters**	**$1,019,335**	$7,581,665
**US Open**	**$3,000,000**	$10,581,665
**Paris Masters**	**€892,590**	$11,524,597
**ATP Finals**	**$4,411,500**	$15,936,097
		$15,936,097
**Doubles**
Event	Prize money	Year-to-date
Adelaide International 1	$785	$785
Cincinnati Masters	$7,725	$8,510
Paris Masters	€7,040	$15,947
		$15,947
**Total**
		**$15,952,044**

Figures in United States dollars (USD) unless noted.

- source：2023 Singles Activity
- source：2023 Doubles Activity

== See also ==
- 2023 ATP Tour
- 2023 Daniil Medvedev tennis season
- 2023 Carlos Alcaraz tennis season
