= 2023 Carlos Alcaraz tennis season =

Tennis player season

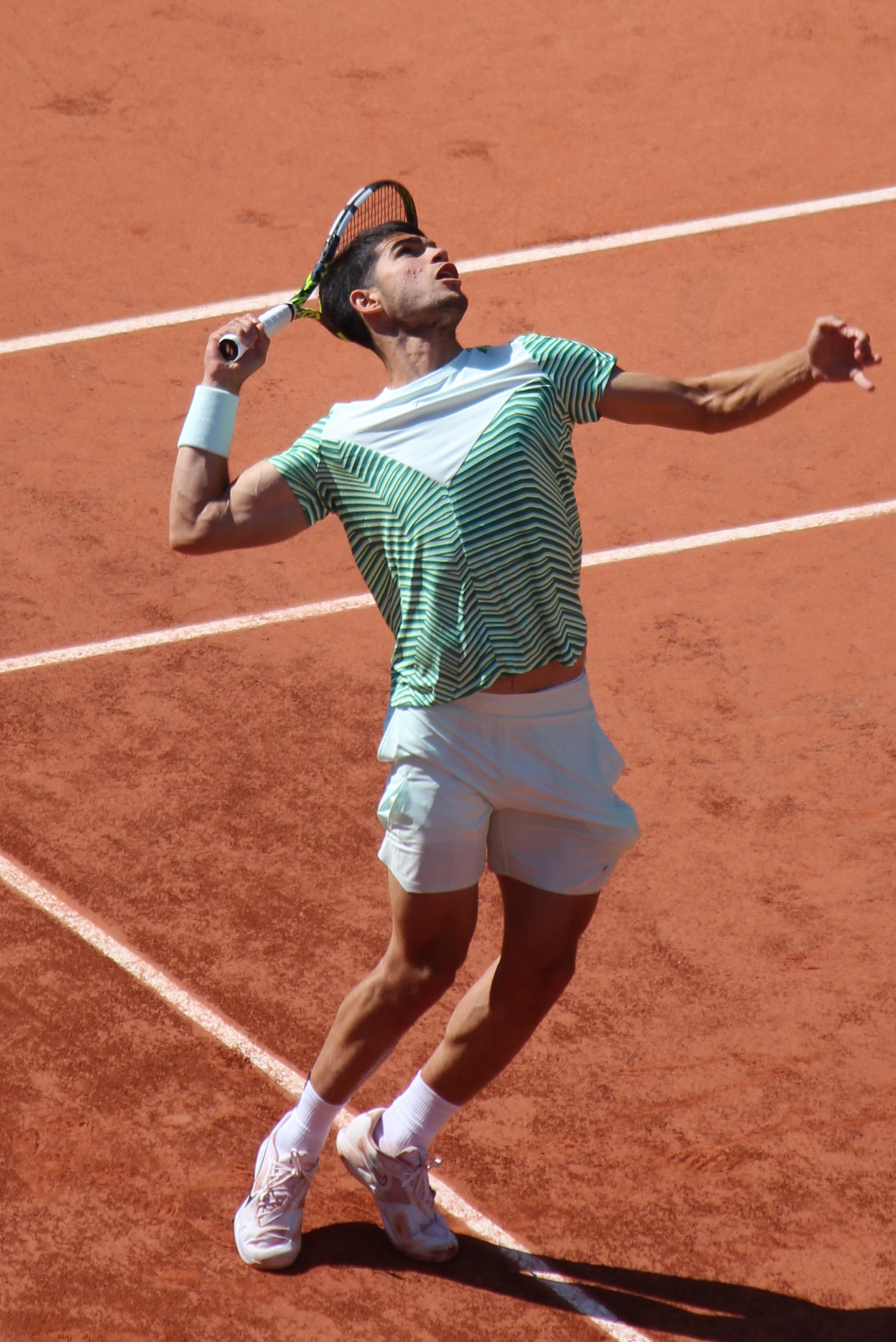
- Alcaraz at the 2023 French Open
- Full name: Carlos Alcaraz Garfia
- Country: Spain
- Calendar prize money: $15,196,504

Singles
- Season record: 65–12 (84.42%)
- Calendar titles: 6
- Year-end ranking: No. 2
- Ranking change from previous year: ▼1

Grand Slam & significant results
- Australian Open: A
- French Open: SF
- Wimbledon: W
- US Open: SF

Doubles
- Season record: 0–0

Injuries
- Injuries: Hamstring injury to right leg (January 6); Arthritis and spinal discomfort (April 4); Left foot injury (October 18)

The 2023 Carlos Alcaraz tennis season officially began on 16 January 2023, with the start of the Australian Open in Melbourne. Due to injury, Alcaraz withdrew from the Australian Open and made his season debut at the Argentina Open instead.

During this season, Alcaraz:

- Won his first Wimbledon title (second major title overall)
- Won his third and fourth Masters 1000 titles (Madrid and Indian Wells)
- Won his first and second grass court tournaments
- Recorded his 100th career victory
- Clinched the world number 1 ranking for a career total of 36 weeks

== Yearly summary ==
=== Early hard court season ===
==== Australian Open withdrawal ====
Alcaraz withdrew from the Australian Open after suffering an injury to the hamstring in his right leg during preseason training. Following the tournament, Alcaraz lost the world No. 1 ranking to Novak Djokovic; he had held it for a total of 20 weeks.

=== Golden Swing ===
==== Argentina Open ====
Alcaraz made his season debut in Buenos Aires, where he was playing for the first time. He defeated second seed Cameron Norrie in the final in straight sets to claim his first title since his first major win at the US Open in 2022.

==== Rio Open ====
The next week, Alcaraz reached the final of the Rio Open, where he was defending champion, also against Norrie; however, he aggravated his leg injury during the match and lost in three sets. Alcaraz then withdrew from the Mexican Open, citing the same injury.

=== Sunshine Double tournaments ===
==== Indian Wells ====
Alcaraz then returned to Indian Wells. He recorded his 100th career win by defeating 31st seed Tallon Griekspoor in the third round, making him the second fastest player to reach this milestone after John McEnroe. He defeated eleventh seed Jannik Sinner in the semifinals, and second seed Daniil Medvedev in the final, to lift the trophy without dropping a single set. This was Alcaraz's eighth career title and third ATP 1000 title. He broke Medvedev's 19-match winning streak, and became the first player to win Indian Wells without dropping a set since Roger Federer in 2017. He also became the ninth and youngest man to win both legs of the Sunshine Double. As a result, he regained the world No. 1 ranking on 20 March 2023.

==== Miami Open ====
Alcaraz hoped to complete the Sunshine Double in Miami, where he was the defending champion. He reached the semifinals without dropping a set, defeating Facundo Bagnis, Dušan Lajović, 16th seed Tommy Paul and ninth seed Taylor Fritz. He then lost to Jannik Sinner in three sets. With the loss of his title points, Alcaraz dropped back to No. 2 in the world rankings.

=== European clay season ===
Alcaraz withdrew from Monte-Carlo, citing "physical discomfort" including post-traumatic arthritis in his left hand and muscular discomfort in his spine.

==== Barcelona Open ====
Alcaraz defended his title in Barcelona without dropping a set. It took him less than eighty minutes to dispatch second seed Stefanos Tsitsipas in the final. This was the first successful title defense of his career.

==== Madrid Open ====
Alcaraz also successfully defended his title in Madrid, beating lucky loser Jan-Lennard Struff in the final in three sets. This was Alcaraz's 21st consecutive match win on Spanish clay.

==== Italian Open ====
Alcaraz played the Italian Open for the first time in his career. He received a bye into the second round, and retrieved the world No. 1 ranking from Novak Djokovic simply by playing that match. He was then upset by world No. 135 Fábián Marozsán in the third round in straight sets. Marozsán became the lowest ranked player to beat Alcaraz since July 2021. Jon Wertheim labelled this the biggest upset of the year.

==== French Open ====
Alcaraz arrived at Roland Garros in red-hot form, and only dropped one set before the semifinals (to Taro Daniel in the second round). In the semifinals, Alcaraz met Novak Djokovic for their second career meeting. This was a highly anticipated showdown, as the two men had not played a match in over a year despite their ongoing fight over the world No. 1 ranking. The match was competitive until Alcaraz faltered at the start of the third set due to cramps from mental pressure and physical intensity; Djokovic won in four sets, going on to win the tournament and regain the No. 1 ranking.

=== Grass season ===
==== Queen's Club Championships ====
Alcaraz elected to play at the Queen's Club for the first time as a warm-up tournament before Wimbledon. Alcaraz had little experience on grass, and as a Spanish clay courter with a relatively weak serve, was not expected to dominate there. Alcaraz dropped the first set of his first match at Queen's to Arthur Rinderknech. He improved his movement on grass as the match progressed to snatch the second set, and then rallied from a break down to win the third set in a tiebreak, 4–6, 7–5, 7–6^{(7-3)}. Alcaraz then sailed through the rest of the tournament without dropping a set, defeating Alex de Minaur in the final. This was Alcaraz's first career title on grass in only his third career tournament on grass. This victory also restored him as world No. 1, and positioned him as top seed for Wimbledon.

==== Wimbledon ====
Despite this victory, expectations remained cautious for Alcaraz at Wimbledon. However, he only dropped two sets en route to the final, where he faced off against seven-time champion and four-time defending champion Novak Djokovic. After being breadsticked in a lopsided first set, Alcaraz regrouped to win the second set in a tiebreak and to breadstick Djokovic back in the third set. He lost the fourth set, but broke early in the fifth to win the match (1–6, 7–6^{(8–6)}, 6–1, 3–6, 6–4). The match had lasted four hours and forty-two minutes, and was instantly acclaimed as a modern epic. This was Alcaraz's first Wimbledon title, and his second major title overall. Alcaraz became the only man outside the Big Four to claim the Wimbledon singles title since 2002, before he himself had been born. With this win, Alcaraz became the second player, after Andy Murray, to defeat Djokovic in a Wimbledon final. Additionally, Alcaraz became the first non-"Big 4" player to win Wimbledon since Lleyton Hewitt's victory in 2002.

Prior to the tournament, Djokovic and Daniil Medvedev had both been in contention to seize the No. 1 ranking. Alcaraz retained the ranking with his victory, and became the first player to qualify for the year-end championships.

=== North American hard court season ===
==== Canadian Open ====
Alcaraz entered the Canadian Open for the second time in his career. He reached the quarterfinals, where he lost to Tommy Paul for the second year in a row. This ended Alcaraz's fourteen-match winning streak.

==== Cincinnati Open ====
Alcaraz then played in Cincinnati. He was taken to three sets in every round but nevertheless reached the final, where he once again faced off against Novak Djokovic. Alcaraz took an initial lead, but Djokovic fought off a championship point in the second set to eventually win in three. The match was the longest best-of-three-sets ATP Tour final in history, as well as the longest match in the tournament's history, at 3 hours and 49 minutes. It was once again immediately heralded as one of the best matches ever. Alcaraz then entered the US Open as defending champion. Having dropped only one set to reach the semifinal, Alcaraz was then upset in four sets by another former champion, third seed Daniil Medvedev. Following the tournament Alcaraz lost the No. 1 ranking once again to eventual champion Djokovic, who had not been defending any points. He additionally withdrew from the Davis Cup Finals, citing tiredness.

=== Asian hard court swing ===
==== China Open ====
Alcaraz entered the autumn-winter hardcourt season with the goal of gaining the year-end No. 1 ranking. He played the Asian swing for the first time, where his results were mixed. In Beijing, he reached the semifinals, where he lost to eventual champion Jannik Sinner in straight sets.

==== Shanghai Open ====
Alcaraz lost in the fourth round of the Shanghai Masters to Grigor Dimitrov in three sets.

=== Indoor hard court season ===
Alcaraz withdrew from Basel, citing a left foot injury and muscle fatigue in his lower back.

==== Paris Masters ====
Alcaraz entered the Paris Masters. He received a bye into the second round, where he was upset by qualifier Roman Safiullin in straight sets. This was Alcaraz's first and only opening round loss of the season.

==== ATP Finals ====
Alcaraz qualified for the ATP Finals for the second year in a row, and played them for the first time. He lost to Alexander Zverev in the round robin stage but defeated Andrey Rublev and Daniil Medvedev to qualify for the semifinals, where he lost decisively to eventual champion Novak Djokovic in straight sets. Alcaraz ended the year ranked No. 2.

== All matches ==
This table chronicles all the matches of Carlos Alcaraz in 2023.

Key
W	F	SF	QF	#R	RR	Q#	P#	DNQ	A	Z#	PO	G	S	B	NMS	NTI	P	NH

(W) winner; (F) finalist; (SF) semifinalist; (QF) quarterfinalist; (#R) rounds 4, 3, 2, 1; (RR) round-robin stage; (Q#) qualification round; (P#) preliminary round; (DNQ) did not qualify; (A) absent; (Z#) Davis/Fed Cup Zonal Group (with number indication) or (PO) play-off; (G) gold, (S) silver or (B) bronze Olympic/Paralympic medal; (NMS) not a Masters tournament; (NTI) not a Tier I tournament; (P) postponed; (NH) not held; (SR) strike rate (events won / competed); (W–L) win–loss record.
To avoid confusion and double counting, these charts are updated at the conclusion of a tournament or when the player's participation has ended.

=== Singles matches ===
Tournament	Match	Round	Opponent (seed or key)	Rank	Result	Score
Australian Open; Melbourne, Australia; Grand Slam tournament Hard, outdoor 16 – 29 January 2023
Australian Open; Melbourne, Australia; Grand Slam tournament Hard, outdoor 16 – 29 January 2023	Withdrew					
Argentina Open; Buenos Aires, Argentina; ATP 250; Clay, outdoor 13 – 19 February 2023
Argentina Open; Buenos Aires, Argentina; ATP 250; Clay, outdoor 13 – 19 February 2023	–	1R	Bye			
Argentina Open; Buenos Aires, Argentina; ATP 250; Clay, outdoor 13 – 19 February 2023	1 / 122	2R	(Serbia) Laslo Đere	57	Win	6–2, 4–6, 6–2
Argentina Open; Buenos Aires, Argentina; ATP 250; Clay, outdoor 13 – 19 February 2023	2 / 123	QF	(Serbia) Dušan Lajović	90	Win	6–4, 6–2
Argentina Open; Buenos Aires, Argentina; ATP 250; Clay, outdoor 13 – 19 February 2023	3 / 124	SF	(Spain) Bernabé Zapata Miralles	74	Win	6–2, 6–2
Argentina Open; Buenos Aires, Argentina; ATP 250; Clay, outdoor 13 – 19 February 2023	4 / 125	W	(United Kingdom) Cameron Norrie (2)	12	Win (1)	6–3, 7–5
Rio Open; Rio de Janeiro, Brazil; ATP 500; Clay, outdoor 20 – 26 February 2023
Rio Open; Rio de Janeiro, Brazil; ATP 500; Clay, outdoor 20 – 26 February 2023	5 / 126	1R	(Brazil) Mateus Alves (WC)	556	Win	6–4, 6–4
Rio Open; Rio de Janeiro, Brazil; ATP 500; Clay, outdoor 20 – 26 February 2023	6 / 127	2R	(Italy) Fabio Fognini	86	Win	6–7^{(5–7)}, 6–2, 6–4
Rio Open; Rio de Janeiro, Brazil; ATP 500; Clay, outdoor 20 – 26 February 2023	7 / 128	QF	(Serbia) Dušan Lajović	80	Win	6–4, 7–6^{(7–0)}
Rio Open; Rio de Janeiro, Brazil; ATP 500; Clay, outdoor 20 – 26 February 2023	8 / 129	SF	(Chile) Nicolás Jarry (Q)	139	Win	6–7^{(2–7)}, 7–5, 6–0
Rio Open; Rio de Janeiro, Brazil; ATP 500; Clay, outdoor 20 – 26 February 2023	9 / 130	F	(United Kingdom) Cameron Norrie (2)	13	Loss	7–5, 4–6, 5–7
Mexican Open; Acapulco, Mexico; ATP 500; Hard, outdoor 27 February – 4 March 2023
Mexican Open; Acapulco, Mexico; ATP 500; Hard, outdoor 27 February – 4 March 2023	Withdrew					
Indian Wells Open; Indian Wells, United States; ATP 1000; Hard, outdoor 8 – 19 March 2023
Indian Wells Open; Indian Wells, United States; ATP 1000; Hard, outdoor 8 – 19 March 2023	–	1R	Bye			
Indian Wells Open; Indian Wells, United States; ATP 1000; Hard, outdoor 8 – 19 March 2023	10 / 131	2R	(Australia) Thanasi Kokkinakis (Q)	94	Win	6–3, 6–3
Indian Wells Open; Indian Wells, United States; ATP 1000; Hard, outdoor 8 – 19 March 2023	11 / 132	3R	(Netherlands) Tallon Griekspoor (31)	36	Win	7–6^{(7–4)}, 6–3
Indian Wells Open; Indian Wells, United States; ATP 1000; Hard, outdoor 8 – 19 March 2023	12 / 133	4R	(United Kingdom) Jack Draper	56	Win	6–2, 2–0 ret.
Indian Wells Open; Indian Wells, United States; ATP 1000; Hard, outdoor 8 – 19 March 2023	13 / 134	QF	(Canada) Félix Auger-Aliassime (8)	10	Win	6–4, 6–4
Indian Wells Open; Indian Wells, United States; ATP 1000; Hard, outdoor 8 – 19 March 2023	14 / 135	SF	(Italy) Jannik Sinner (11)	13	Win	7–6^{(7–4)}, 6–3
Indian Wells Open; Indian Wells, United States; ATP 1000; Hard, outdoor 8 – 19 March 2023	15 / 136	W	Daniil Medvedev (5)	6	Win (2)	6–3, 6–2
Miami Open; Miami Gardens, United States; ATP 1000; Hard, outdoor 22 March – 2 April 2023
Miami Open; Miami Gardens, United States; ATP 1000; Hard, outdoor 22 March – 2 April 2023	–	1R	Bye			
Miami Open; Miami Gardens, United States; ATP 1000; Hard, outdoor 22 March – 2 April 2023	16 / 137	2R	(Argentina) Facundo Bagnis	100	Win	6–0, 6–2
Miami Open; Miami Gardens, United States; ATP 1000; Hard, outdoor 22 March – 2 April 2023	17 / 138	3R	(Serbia) Dušan Lajović	76	Win	6–0, 7–6^{(7–5)}
Miami Open; Miami Gardens, United States; ATP 1000; Hard, outdoor 22 March – 2 April 2023	18 / 139	4R	(United States) Tommy Paul (16)	19	Win	6–4, 6–4
Miami Open; Miami Gardens, United States; ATP 1000; Hard, outdoor 22 March – 2 April 2023	19 / 140	QF	(United States) Taylor Fritz (9)	10	Win	6–4, 6–2
Miami Open; Miami Gardens, United States; ATP 1000; Hard, outdoor 22 March – 2 April 2023	20 / 141	SF	(Italy) Jannik Sinner (10)	11	Loss	7–6^{(7–4)}, 4–6, 2–6
Monte-Carlo Masters; Roquebrune-Cap-Martin, France; ATP 1000; Clay, outdoor 9 – 16 April 2023
Monte-Carlo Masters; Roquebrune-Cap-Martin, France; ATP 1000; Clay, outdoor 9 – 16 April 2023	Withdrew					
Barcelona Open; Barcelona, Spain; ATP 500; Clay, outdoor 17 – 23 April 2023
Barcelona Open; Barcelona, Spain; ATP 500; Clay, outdoor 17 – 23 April 2023	–	1R	Bye			
Barcelona Open; Barcelona, Spain; ATP 500; Clay, outdoor 17 – 23 April 2023	21 / 142	2R	(Portugal) Nuno Borges	79	Win	6–3, 6–1
Barcelona Open; Barcelona, Spain; ATP 500; Clay, outdoor 17 – 23 April 2023	22 / 143	3R	(Spain) Roberto Bautista Agut (13)	25	Win	6–3, 7–5
Barcelona Open; Barcelona, Spain; ATP 500; Clay, outdoor 17 – 23 April 2023	23 / 144	QF	(Spain) Alejandro Davidovich Fokina (10)	38	Win	7–6^{(7–5)}, 6–4
Barcelona Open; Barcelona, Spain; ATP 500; Clay, outdoor 17 – 23 April 2023	24 / 145	SF	(United Kingdom) Dan Evans (12)	26	Win	6–2, 6–2
Barcelona Open; Barcelona, Spain; ATP 500; Clay, outdoor 17 – 23 April 2023	25 / 146	W	(Greece) Stefanos Tsitsipas (2)	5	Win (3)	6–3, 6–4
Madrid Open; Madrid, Spain; ATP 1000; Clay, outdoor 26 April – 7 May 2023
Madrid Open; Madrid, Spain; ATP 1000; Clay, outdoor 26 April – 7 May 2023	–	1R	Bye			
Madrid Open; Madrid, Spain; ATP 1000; Clay, outdoor 26 April – 7 May 2023	26 / 147	2R	(Finland) Emil Ruusuvuori	41	Win	2–6, 6–4, 6–2
Madrid Open; Madrid, Spain; ATP 1000; Clay, outdoor 26 April – 7 May 2023	27 / 148	3R	(Bulgaria) Grigor Dimitrov (26)	32	Win	6–2, 7–5
Madrid Open; Madrid, Spain; ATP 1000; Clay, outdoor 26 April – 7 May 2023	28 / 149	4R	(Germany) Alexander Zverev (13)	16	Win	6–1, 6–2
Madrid Open; Madrid, Spain; ATP 1000; Clay, outdoor 26 April – 7 May 2023	29 / 150	QF	Karen Khachanov (10)	12	Win	6–4, 7–5
Madrid Open; Madrid, Spain; ATP 1000; Clay, outdoor 26 April – 7 May 2023	30 / 151	SF	(Croatia) Borna Ćorić (17)	20	Win	6–4, 6–3
Madrid Open; Madrid, Spain; ATP 1000; Clay, outdoor 26 April – 7 May 2023	31 / 152	W	(Germany) Jan-Lennard Struff (LL)	65	Win (4)	6–4, 3–6, 6–3
Italian Open; Rome, Italy; ATP 1000; Clay, outdoor 10 – 21 May 2023
Italian Open; Rome, Italy; ATP 1000; Clay, outdoor 10 – 21 May 2023	–	1R	Bye			
Italian Open; Rome, Italy; ATP 1000; Clay, outdoor 10 – 21 May 2023	32 / 153	2R	(Spain) Albert Ramos Viñolas	72	Win	6–4, 6–1
Italian Open; Rome, Italy; ATP 1000; Clay, outdoor 10 – 21 May 2023	33 / 154	3R	(Hungary) Fábián Marozsán (Q)	135	Loss	3–6, 6–7^{(4–7)}
French Open; Paris, France; Grand Slam tournament Clay, outdoor 28 May – 11 June 2023
French Open; Paris, France; Grand Slam tournament Clay, outdoor 28 May – 11 June 2023	34 / 155	1R	(Italy) Flavio Cobolli (Q)	159	Win	6–0, 6–2, 7–5
French Open; Paris, France; Grand Slam tournament Clay, outdoor 28 May – 11 June 2023	35 / 156	2R	(Japan) Taro Daniel	112	Win	6–1, 3–6, 6–1, 6–2
French Open; Paris, France; Grand Slam tournament Clay, outdoor 28 May – 11 June 2023	36 / 157	3R	(Canada) Denis Shapovalov (26)	32	Win	6–1, 6–4, 6–2
French Open; Paris, France; Grand Slam tournament Clay, outdoor 28 May – 11 June 2023	37 / 158	4R	(Italy) Lorenzo Musetti (17)	18	Win	6–3, 6–2, 6–2
French Open; Paris, France; Grand Slam tournament Clay, outdoor 28 May – 11 June 2023	38 / 159	QF	(Greece) Stefanos Tsitsipas (5)	5	Win	6–2, 6–1, 7–6^{(7–5)}
French Open; Paris, France; Grand Slam tournament Clay, outdoor 28 May – 11 June 2023	39 / 160	SF	(Serbia) Novak Djokovic (3)	3	Loss	3–6, 7–5, 1–6, 1–6
Queen's Club Championships; London, United Kingdom; ATP 500; Grass, outdoor 19 – 25 June 2023
Queen's Club Championships; London, United Kingdom; ATP 500; Grass, outdoor 19 – 25 June 2023	40 / 161	1R	(France) Arthur Rinderknech (LL)	83	Win	4–6, 7–5, 7–6^{(7–3)}
Queen's Club Championships; London, United Kingdom; ATP 500; Grass, outdoor 19 – 25 June 2023	41 / 162	2R	(Czech Republic) Jiří Lehečka	36	Win	6–2, 6–3
Queen's Club Championships; London, United Kingdom; ATP 500; Grass, outdoor 19 – 25 June 2023	42 / 163	QF	(Bulgaria) Grigor Dimitrov (Q)	26	Win	6–4, 6–4
Queen's Club Championships; London, United Kingdom; ATP 500; Grass, outdoor 19 – 25 June 2023	43 / 164	SF	(United States) Sebastian Korda	32	Win	6–3, 6–4
Queen's Club Championships; London, United Kingdom; ATP 500; Grass, outdoor 19 – 25 June 2023	44 / 165	W	(Australia) Alex de Minaur (7)	18	Win (5)	6–4, 6–4
Wimbledon; London, United Kingdom; Grand Slam tournament Grass, outdoor 3 – 16 July 2023
Wimbledon; London, United Kingdom; Grand Slam tournament Grass, outdoor 3 – 16 July 2023	45 / 166	1R	(France) Jérémy Chardy (PR)	542	Win	6–0, 6–2, 7–5
Wimbledon; London, United Kingdom; Grand Slam tournament Grass, outdoor 3 – 16 July 2023	46 / 167	2R	(France) Alexandre Müller	84	Win	6–4, 7–6^{(7–2)}, 6–3
Wimbledon; London, United Kingdom; Grand Slam tournament Grass, outdoor 3 – 16 July 2023	47 / 168	3R	(Chile) Nicolás Jarry (25)	28	Win	6–3, 6–7^{(6–8)}, 6–3, 7–5
Wimbledon; London, United Kingdom; Grand Slam tournament Grass, outdoor 3 – 16 July 2023	48 / 169	4R	(Italy) Matteo Berrettini	38	Win	3–6, 6–3, 6–3, 6–3
Wimbledon; London, United Kingdom; Grand Slam tournament Grass, outdoor 3 – 16 July 2023	49 / 170	QF	(Denmark) Holger Rune (6)	6	Win	7–6^{(7–3)}, 6–4, 6–4
Wimbledon; London, United Kingdom; Grand Slam tournament Grass, outdoor 3 – 16 July 2023	50 / 171	SF	Daniil Medvedev (3)	3	Win	6–3, 6–3, 6–3
Wimbledon; London, United Kingdom; Grand Slam tournament Grass, outdoor 3 – 16 July 2023	51 / 172	W	(Serbia) Novak Djokovic (2)	2	Win (6)	1–6, 7–6^{(8–6)}, 6–1, 3–6, 6–4
Canadian Open; Toronto, Canada; ATP 1000; Hard, outdoor 7 – 13 August 2023
Canadian Open; Toronto, Canada; ATP 1000; Hard, outdoor 7 – 13 August 2023	–	1R	Bye			
Canadian Open; Toronto, Canada; ATP 1000; Hard, outdoor 7 – 13 August 2023	52 / 173	2R	(United States) Ben Shelton	41	Win	6–3, 7–6^{(7–3)}
Canadian Open; Toronto, Canada; ATP 1000; Hard, outdoor 7 – 13 August 2023	53 / 174	3R	(Poland) Hubert Hurkacz (15)	17	Win	3–6, 7–6^{(7–2)}, 7–6^{(7–3)}
Canadian Open; Toronto, Canada; ATP 1000; Hard, outdoor 7 – 13 August 2023	54 / 175	QF	(United States) Tommy Paul (12)	14	Loss	3–6, 6–4, 3–6
Cincinnati Open; Cincinnati, United States; ATP 1000; Hard, outdoor 13 – 20 August 2023
Cincinnati Open; Cincinnati, United States; ATP 1000; Hard, outdoor 13 – 20 August 2023	–	1R	Bye			
Cincinnati Open; Cincinnati, United States; ATP 1000; Hard, outdoor 13 – 20 August 2023	55 / 176	2R	(Australia) Jordan Thompson (Q)	55	Win	7–5, 4–6, 6–3
Cincinnati Open; Cincinnati, United States; ATP 1000; Hard, outdoor 13 – 20 August 2023	56 / 177	3R	(United States) Tommy Paul (14)	13	Win	7–6^{(8–6)}, 6–7^{(0–7)}, 6–3
Cincinnati Open; Cincinnati, United States; ATP 1000; Hard, outdoor 13 – 20 August 2023	57 / 178	QF	(Australia) Max Purcell (Q)	70	Win	4–6, 6–3, 6–4
Cincinnati Open; Cincinnati, United States; ATP 1000; Hard, outdoor 13 – 20 August 2023	58 / 179	SF	(Poland) Hubert Hurkacz	20	Win	2–6, 7–6^{(7–4)}, 6–3
Cincinnati Open; Cincinnati, United States; ATP 1000; Hard, outdoor 13 – 20 August 2023	59 / 180	F	(Serbia) Novak Djokovic (2)	2	Loss	7–5, 6–7^{(7–9)}, 6–7^{(4–7)}
US Open; New York City, United States; Grand Slam tournament Hard, outdoor 28 August – 10 September 2023
US Open; New York City, United States; Grand Slam tournament Hard, outdoor 28 August – 10 September 2023	60 / 181	1R	(Germany) Dominik Koepfer	75	Win	6–2, 3–2, Ret.
US Open; New York City, United States; Grand Slam tournament Hard, outdoor 28 August – 10 September 2023	61 / 182	2R	(South Africa) Lloyd Harris (PR)	177	Win	6–3, 6–1, 7–6^{(7–4)}
US Open; New York City, United States; Grand Slam tournament Hard, outdoor 28 August – 10 September 2023	62 / 183	3R	(United Kingdom) Dan Evans (26)	28	Win	6–2, 6–3, 4–6, 6–3
US Open; New York City, United States; Grand Slam tournament Hard, outdoor 28 August – 10 September 2023	63 / 184	4R	(Italy) Matteo Arnaldi	61	Win	6–3, 6–3, 6–4
US Open; New York City, United States; Grand Slam tournament Hard, outdoor 28 August – 10 September 2023	64 / 185	QF	(Germany) Alexander Zverev (12)	12	Win	6–3, 6–2, 6–4
US Open; New York City, United States; Grand Slam tournament Hard, outdoor 28 August – 10 September 2023	65 / 186	SF	Daniil Medvedev (3)	3	Loss	6–7^{(3–7)}, 1–6, 6–3, 3–6
China Open; Beijing, China; ATP 500; Hard, outdoor 28 September – 4 October 2023
China Open; Beijing, China; ATP 500; Hard, outdoor 28 September – 4 October 2023	66 / 187	1R	(Germany) Yannick Hanfmann (Q)	53	Win	6–4, 6–3
China Open; Beijing, China; ATP 500; Hard, outdoor 28 September – 4 October 2023	67 / 188	2R	(Italy) Lorenzo Musetti	18	Win	6–2, 6–2
China Open; Beijing, China; ATP 500; Hard, outdoor 28 September – 4 October 2023	68 / 189	QF	(Norway) Casper Ruud (7)	9	Win	6–4, 6–2
China Open; Beijing, China; ATP 500; Hard, outdoor 28 September – 4 October 2023	69 / 190	SF	(Italy) Jannik Sinner (6)	7	Loss	6–7^{(4–7)}, 1–6
Shanghai Masters; Shanghai, China; ATP 1000; Hard, outdoor 4 – 15 October 2023
Shanghai Masters; Shanghai, China; ATP 1000; Hard, outdoor 4 – 15 October 2023	–	1R	Bye			
Shanghai Masters; Shanghai, China; ATP 1000; Hard, outdoor 4 – 15 October 2023	70 / 191	2R	(France) Grégoire Barrère	73	Win	6–2, 7–5
Shanghai Masters; Shanghai, China; ATP 1000; Hard, outdoor 4 – 15 October 2023	71 / 192	3R	(United Kingdom) Dan Evans (30)	33	Win	7–6^{(7–1)}, 6–4
Shanghai Masters; Shanghai, China; ATP 1000; Hard, outdoor 4 – 15 October 2023	72 / 193	4R	(Bulgaria) Grigor Dimitrov (18)	19	Loss	7–5, 2–6, 4–6
Swiss Indoors; Basel, Switzerland; ATP 500; Hard, indoor 23 – 29 October 2023
Swiss Indoors; Basel, Switzerland; ATP 500; Hard, indoor 23 – 29 October 2023	Withdrew					
Paris Masters; Paris, France; ATP 1000; Hard, indoor 30 October – 5 November 2023
Paris Masters; Paris, France; ATP 1000; Hard, indoor 30 October – 5 November 2023	–	1R	Bye			
Paris Masters; Paris, France; ATP 1000; Hard, indoor 30 October – 5 November 2023	73 / 194	2R	Roman Safiullin (Q)	45	Loss	3–6, 4–6
ATP Finals; Turin, Italy; ATP Finals; Hard, indoor 12 – 19 November 2023
ATP Finals; Turin, Italy; ATP Finals; Hard, indoor 12 – 19 November 2023	74 / 195	RR	(Germany) Alexander Zverev (7)	7	Loss	7–6^{(7–3)}, 3–6, 4–6
ATP Finals; Turin, Italy; ATP Finals; Hard, indoor 12 – 19 November 2023	75 / 196	RR	Andrey Rublev (5)	5	Win	7–5, 6–2
ATP Finals; Turin, Italy; ATP Finals; Hard, indoor 12 – 19 November 2023	76 / 197	RR	Daniil Medvedev (3)	3	Win	6–4, 6–4
ATP Finals; Turin, Italy; ATP Finals; Hard, indoor 12 – 19 November 2023	77 / 198	SF	(Serbia) Novak Djokovic (1)	1	Loss	3–6, 2–6

=== Hopman Cup matches ===
==== Singles ====
Tournament	Match	Round	Opponent (seed or key)	Rank	Result	Score
Hopman Cup; Nice, France; Hopman Cup; Clay, outdoor 19 – 23 July 2023
Hopman Cup; Nice, France; Hopman Cup; Clay, outdoor 19 – 23 July 2023	1 / 1	RR	(Belgium) David Goffin	111	Win	4–6, 6–4, [10–8]
Hopman Cup; Nice, France; Hopman Cup; Clay, outdoor 19 – 23 July 2023	3 / 3	RR	(Croatia) Borna Ćorić	15	Win	6–3, 6–7^{(6–8)}, [10–5]

==== Mixed doubles ====
Tournament	Match	Round	Opponents (seed or key)	Ranks	Result	Score
Hopman Cup; Nice, France; Hopman Cup; Clay, outdoor 19 – 23 July 2023; Partner: (Spain) Rebeka Masarova
Hopman Cup; Nice, France; Hopman Cup; Clay, outdoor 19 – 23 July 2023; Partner: (Spain) Rebeka Masarova	2 / 2	RR	(Belgium) David Goffin / (Belgium) Elise Mertens	842 / 6	Loss	3–6, 1–6
Hopman Cup; Nice, France; Hopman Cup; Clay, outdoor 19 – 23 July 2023; Partner: (Spain) Rebeka Masarova	4 / 4	RR	(Croatia) Borna Ćorić / (Croatia) Donna Vekić	– / 910	Loss	6–1, 4–6, [12–14]

== Exhibition matches ==
=== Singles ===
Tournament	Match	Round	Opponent (seed or key)	Rank	Result	Score
Mubadala World Tennis Championship; Abu Dhabi, United Arab Emirates Hard, outdoor 16 – 18 December 2022
Mubadala World Tennis Championship; Abu Dhabi, United Arab Emirates Hard, outdoor 16 – 18 December 2022	–	QF	Bye			
Mubadala World Tennis Championship; Abu Dhabi, United Arab Emirates Hard, outdoor 16 – 18 December 2022	1	SF	Andrey Rublev (4)	8	Loss	2–6, 1–6
Mubadala World Tennis Championship; Abu Dhabi, United Arab Emirates Hard, outdoor 16 – 18 December 2022	2	PO	(Norway) Casper Ruud (2)	3	Loss	1–6, 4–6
Tennis Fest; Plaza México, Mexico City, Mexico Hard, outdoor 29 November 2023
Tennis Fest; Plaza México, Mexico City, Mexico Hard, outdoor 29 November 2023	1	PO	(United States) Tommy Paul		Win	7–6^{(7–3)}, 6–3

== Schedule ==
Per Carlos Alcaraz, this is his current 2023 schedule (subject to change).

=== Singles schedule ===
Date	Tournament	Location	Tier	Surface	Prev. result	Prev. points	New points	Result
16 January 2023– 29 January 2023	Australian Open	Melbourne (AUS)	Grand Slam	Hard	3R	90	0	Withdrew
13 February 2023– 19 February 2023	Argentina Open	Buenos Aires (ARG)	250 Series	Clay	N/A	0	250	Champion (defeated Cameron Norrie, 6–3, 7–5)
20 February 2023– 26 February 2023	Rio Open	Rio de Janeiro (BRA)	500 Series	Clay	W	500	300	Final (lost to Cameron Norrie, 7–5, 4–6, 5–7)
27 February 2023– 4 March 2023	Mexican Open	Acapulco (MEX)	500 Series	Hard	N/A	0	0	Withdrew
8 March 2023– 19 March 2023	Indian Wells Masters	Indian Wells (USA)	Masters 1000	Hard	SF	360	1,000	Champion (defeated Daniil Medvedev, 6–3, 6–2)
22 March 2023– 2 April 2023	Miami Open	Miami (USA)	Masters 1000	Hard	W	1000	360	Semifinal (lost to Jannik Sinner, 7–6^{(7–4)}, 4–6, 2–6)
9 April 2023– 16 April 2023	Monte-Carlo Masters	Roquebrune-Cap-Martin (FRA)	Masters 1000	Clay	2R	10	0	Withdrew
17 April 2023– 23 April 2023	Barcelona Open	Barcelona (ESP)	500 Series	Clay	W	500	500	Champion (defeated Stefanos Tsitsipas, 6–3, 6–4)
26 April 2023– 7 May 2023	Madrid Open	Madrid (ESP)	Masters 1000	Clay	W	1000	1000	Champion (defeated Jan-Lennard Struff, 6–4, 3–6, 6–3)
10 May 2023– 21 May 2023	Italian Open	Rome (ITA)	Masters 1000	Clay	N/A	0	45	Third round (lost to Fábián Marozsán, 3–6, 6–7^{(4–7)})
28 May 2023– 11 June 2023	French Open	Paris (FRA)	Grand Slam	Clay	QF	360	720	Semifinal (lost to Novak Djokovic, 3–6, 7–5, 1–6, 1–6)
19 June 2023– 25 June 2023	Queen's Club Championships	London (UK)	500 Series	Grass	N/A	0	500	Champion (defeated Alex de Minaur, 6–4, 6–4)
3 July 2023– 17 July 2023	Wimbledon	London (UK)	Grand Slam	Grass	4R	0 (Note: Removal Of ATP Rankings Points From 2022 Wimbledon.)	2000	Champion (defeated Novak Djokovic, 1–6, 7–6^{(8–6)}, 6–1, 3–6, 6–4)
24 July 2023– 30 July 2023	Hamburg European Open	Hamburg (GER)	500 Series	Clay	F	300	0	Withdrew
24 July 2023– 30 July 2023	Croatia Open	Umag (CRO)	250 series	Clay	F	150	0	Withdrew
7 August 2023– 13 August 2023	Canadian Open	Toronto (CAN)	Masters 1000	Hard	2R	10	180	Quarterfinals (lost to Tommy Paul, 3–6, 6–4, 3–6)
13 August 2023– 20 August 2023	Cincinnati Masters	Cincinnati (USA)	Masters 1000	Hard	QF	180	600	Final (lost to Novak Djokovic, 7–5, 6–7^{(7–9)}, 6–7^{(4–7)})
28 August 2023– 10 September 2023	US Open	New York (USA)	Grand Slam	Hard	W	2000	720	Semifinal (lost to Daniil Medvedev, 6–7^{(3–7)}, 1–6, 6–2, 3–6)
28 September 2023– 4 October 2023	China Open	Beijing (CHN)	500 Series	Hard	N/A	0	180	Semifinal (lost to Jannik Sinner, 6–7^{(4–7)}, 1–6)
4 October 2023– 15 October 2023	Shanghai Masters	Shanghai (CHN)	Masters 1000	Hard	N/A	0	90	Fourth round (lost to Grigor Dimitrov, 7–5, 2–6, 4–6)
23 October 2023– 29 October 2023	Swiss Indoors	Basel (SUI)	500 Series	Hard (i)	SF	180	0	Withdrew
30 October 2023– 5 November 2023	Paris Masters	Paris (FRA)	Masters 1000	Hard (i)	QF	180	10	Second round (lost to Roman Safiullin, 3–6, 4–6)
12 November 2023– 19 November 2023	ATP Finals	Turin (ITA)	Tour Finals	Hard (i)	N/A	0	400	Semifinals (lost to Novak Djokovic, 3–6, 2–6)
Total year-end points						6820	8855	▲2035 difference

- source：Rankings breakdown

== Yearly records ==
=== Head-to-head matchups ===
Carlos Alcaraz has a 65–12 ATP match win–loss record in the 2023 season. His record against players who were part of the ATP rankings Top Ten at the time of their meetings is 11–6. Bold indicates player was ranked top 10 at the time of at least one meeting. The following list is ordered by number of wins:

- (United Kingdom) Dan Evans 3–0
- (Serbia) Dušan Lajović 3–0
- **Daniil Medvedev** 3–1
- (Poland) Hubert Hurkacz 2–0
- (Chile) Nicolás Jarry 2–0
- (Italy) Lorenzo Musetti 2–0
- **(Greece) Stefanos Tsitsipas** 2–0
- (Bulgaria) Grigor Dimitrov 2–1
- (United States) Tommy Paul 2–1
- (Germany) Alexander Zverev 2–1
- **(Canada) Félix Auger-Aliassime** 1–0
- (Brazil) Mateus Alves 1–0
- (Italy) Matteo Arnaldi 1–0
- (Argentina) Facundo Bagnis 1–0
- (France) Grégoire Barrère 1–0
- (Spain) Roberto Bautista Agut 1–0
- (Italy) Matteo Berrettini 1–0
- (Portugal) Nuno Borges 1–0
- (France) Jérémy Chardy 1–0
- (Italy) Flavio Cobolli 1–0
- (Croatia) Borna Ćorić 1–0
- (Japan) Taro Daniel 1–0
- (Spain) Alejandro Davidovich Fokina 1–0
- (Germany) Yannick Hanfmann 1–0
- (Australia) Alex de Minaur 1–0
- (Serbia) Laslo Đere 1–0
- (United Kingdom) Jack Draper 1–0
- (Italy) Fabio Fognini 1–0
- **(United States) Taylor Fritz** 1–0
- (Netherlands) Tallon Griekspoor 1–0
- (South Africa) Lloyd Harris 1–0
- **(Norway) Casper Ruud** 1–0
- Karen Khachanov 1–0
- (Germany) Dominik Koepfer 1–0
- (Australia) Thanasi Kokkinakis 1–0
- (United States) Sebastian Korda 1–0
- (Czech Republic) Jiří Lehečka 1–0
- (Spain) Bernabé Zapata Miralles 1–0
- (France) Alexandre Müller 1–0
- (Australia) Max Purcell 1–0
- (Spain) Albert Ramos Viñolas 1–0
- (France) Arthur Rinderknech 1–0
- **Andrey Rublev** 1–0
- **(Denmark) Holger Rune** 1–0
- (Finland) Emil Ruusuvuori 1–0
- (Canada) Denis Shapovalov 1–0
- (United States) Ben Shelton 1–0
- (Germany) Jan-Lennard Struff 1–0
- (Australia) Jordan Thompson 1–0
- (United Kingdom) Cameron Norrie 1–1
- **(Italy) Jannik Sinner** 1–2
- **(Serbia) Novak Djokovic** 1–3
- (Hungary) Fábián Marozsán 0–1
- Roman Safiullin 0–1

* Statistics correct as of 18 November 2023.

=== Top 10 record (11–6) ===
Category Grand Slam (4–2) ATP Finals (2–2) Masters 1000 (3–1) 500 Series (2–1) 250 Series (0–0)	Wins by surface Hard (6–5) Clay (2–1) Grass (3–0)	Wins by setting Outdoor (9–4) Indoor (2–2)

Result	W–L	Player	Rk	Event	Surface	Rd	Score	Rk	Ref
Win	1–0	(Canada) Félix Auger-Aliassime	10	Indian Wells Open, United States	Hard	QF	6–4, 6–4	2	
Win	2–0	Daniil Medvedev	6	Indian Wells Open, United States	Hard	F	6–3, 6–2	2	
Win	3–0	(United States) Taylor Fritz	10	Miami Open, United States	Hard	QF	6–4, 6–2	**1**	
Win	4–0	(Greece) Stefanos Tsitsipas	5	Barcelona Open, Spain	Clay	F	6–3, 6–4	2	
Win	5–0	(Greece) Stefanos Tsitsipas	5	French Open, France	Clay	QF	6–2, 6–1, 7–6^{(7–5)}	**1**	
Loss	5–1	(Serbia) Novak Djokovic	3	French Open, France	Clay	SF	3–6, 7–5, 1–6, 1–6	**1**	
Win	6–1	(Denmark) Holger Rune	6	Wimbledon, United Kingdom	Grass	QF	7–6^{(7–3)}, 6–4, 6–4	**1**	
Win	7–1	Daniil Medvedev	3	Wimbledon, United Kingdom	Grass	SF	6–3, 6–3, 6–3	**1**	
Win	8–1	(Serbia) Novak Djokovic	2	Wimbledon, United Kingdom	Grass	F	1–6, 7–6^{(8–6)}, 6–1, 3–6, 6–4	**1**	
Loss	8–2	(Serbia) Novak Djokovic	2	Cincinnati Open, United States	Hard	F	7–5, 6–7^{(7–9)}, 6–7^{(4–7)}	**1**	
Loss	8–3	Daniil Medvedev	3	US Open, United States	Hard	SF	6–7^{(3–7)}, 1–6, 6–3, 3–6	**1**	
Win	9–3	(Norway) Casper Ruud	9	China Open, China	Hard	QF	6–4, 6–2	2	
Loss	9–4	(Italy) Jannik Sinner	7	China Open, China	Hard	SF	6–7^{(4–7)}, 1–6	2	
Loss	9–5	(Germany) Alexander Zverev	7	ATP Finals, Italy	Hard (i)	RR	7–6^{(7–3)}, 3–6, 4–6	2	
Win	10–5	Andrey Rublev	5	ATP Finals, Italy	Hard (i)	RR	7–5, 6–2	2	
Win	11–5	Daniil Medvedev	3	ATP Finals, Italy	Hard (i)	RR	6–4, 6–4	2	
Loss	11–6	(Serbia) Novak Djokovic	**1**	ATP Finals, Italy	Hard (i)	SF	3–6, 2–6	2	

- Key: (Rk) first use, opponent rank; (Rd) round; (Rk) 2nd use, player rank; (Ref) reference; (F) final; (SF) semifinal; (QF) quarterfinal; (#R) rounds 4, 3, 2, 1; (RR) round-robin stage; (Q#) qualifying rounds or stages (3), 2, 1.

=== Finals ===
==== Singles: 8 (6 Titles, 2 Runner-ups) ====
Category Grand Slam (1–0) ATP Finals (0–0) Masters 1000 (2–1) 500 Series (2–1) 250 Series (1–0)	Titles by surface Hard (1–1) Clay (3–1) Grass (2–0)	Titles by setting Outdoor (6–2) Indoor (0–0)

Result	W–L	Date	Tournament	Tier	Surface	Opponent	Score
Win	1–0	Feb 2023	Argentina Open, Argentina	250 Series	Clay	(United Kingdom) Cameron Norrie	6–3, 7–5
Lost	1–1	Feb 2023	Rio Open, Brazil	500 Series	Clay	(United Kingdom) Cameron Norrie	7–5, 4–6, 5–7
Win	2–1	Mar 2023	Indian Wells Masters, United States	Masters 1000	Hard	Daniil Medvedev	6–3, 6–2
Win	3–1	Apr 2023	Barcelona Open, Spain	500 Series	Clay	(Greece) Stefanos Tsitsipas	6–3, 6–4
Win	4–1	May 2023	Madrid Open, Spain	Masters 1000	Clay	(Germany) Jan-Lennard Struff	6–4, 3–6, 6–3
Win	5–1	Jun 2023	Queen's Club, United Kingdom	500 Series	Grass	(Australia) Alex de Minaur	6–4, 6–4
Win	6–1	Jun 2023	Wimbledon, United Kingdom	Grand Slam	Grass	(Serbia) Novak Djokovic	1–6, 7–6^{(8–6)}, 6–1, 3–6, 6–4
Lost	6–2	Aug 2023	Cincinnati Masters, United States	Masters 1000	Hard	(Serbia) Novak Djokovic	7–5, 6–7^{(7–9)}, 6–7^{(4–7)}

=== Earnings ===
- **Bold** font denotes tournament win

**Singles**
Event	Prize money	Year-to-date
**Argentina Open**	**$95,305**	$95,305
Rio Open	$202,640	$297,945
**Indian Wells Masters**	**$1,262,220**	$1,560,165
Miami Open	$352,635	$1,912,800
**Barcelona Open**	**€477,795**	$2,437,992
**Madrid Open**	**€1,105,265**	$3,652,568
Italian Open	€48,835	$3,706,374
French Open	€630,000	$4,381,986
**Queen's Club Championships**	€410,515	$4,831,089
**Wimbledon Championships**	**£2,350,000**	$7,814,414
Canadian Open	$166,020	$7,980,434
Cincinnati Masters	$556,630	$8,537,064
US Open	$775,000	$9,312,064
China Open	$194,860	$9,506,924
Shanghai Masters	$96,955	$9,603,879
Paris Masters	€41,700	$9,647,931
ATP Finals	$1,105,500	$10,753,431
Bonus pool ATP Ranking: 2	$200,000	$10,953,431
Bonus pool ATP Ranking: 2	$4,243,073	$15,196,504
		$15,196,504
**Total**
		**$15,196,504**

Figures in United States dollars (USD) unless noted.

- source：2023 Singles Activity
- source：2023 Doubles Activity

== See also ==
- 2023 ATP Tour
- 2023 Novak Djokovic tennis season
- 2023 Daniil Medvedev tennis season
