= 2023 Wimbledon Championships – Men's singles final =

Tennis Grand Slam final

2023 Wimbledon Men's singles final
- (Spain) Carlos Alcaraz (1) vs. (Serbia) Novak Djokovic (2)
Set	1	2	3	4	5
(Spain) Carlos Alcaraz	1	7^{8}	6	3	6
(Serbia) Novak Djokovic	6	6^{6}	1	6	4
- Date: Sunday, 16 July 2023
- Tournament: The Championships, Wimbledon
- Location: Centre Court, All England Lawn Tennis and Croquet Club, Wimbledon, London, England
- Chair umpire: Fergus Murphy
- Duration: 4 hours 42 minutes

Previous head-to-head results
- Alcaraz 1–1 Djokovic

The 2023 Wimbledon Championships Men's Singles final was the championship tennis match of the men's singles tournament at the 2023 Wimbledon Championships. First seed Carlos Alcaraz defeated second seed and four-time defending champion Novak Djokovic in five sets to win the title, 1–6, 7–6^{(8–6)}, 6–1, 3–6, 6–4. At 4 hours and 42 minutes, it was the third-longest Wimbledon final in history by duration; the longest being the 2019 final (4 hours and 57 minutes), which Djokovic had won, and the second longest being the 2008 final.

Djokovic was aiming to win a fifth consecutive Wimbledon trophy (which would have equalled Björn Borg and Roger Federer's Open Era record), an eighth title overall (matching Federer's all-time record), and complete the third part of a prospective calendar year Grand Slam. Djokovic's loss was his first on Centre Court in a decade, his last defeat being the 2013 final to Andy Murray, and it was his only loss at the majors that year, as he went on to win the US Open in September. Alcaraz retained the world No. 1 ranking with his victory, and became the first player outside the Big Four to win the tournament since Lleyton Hewitt at the 2002 Championships.

== Background ==
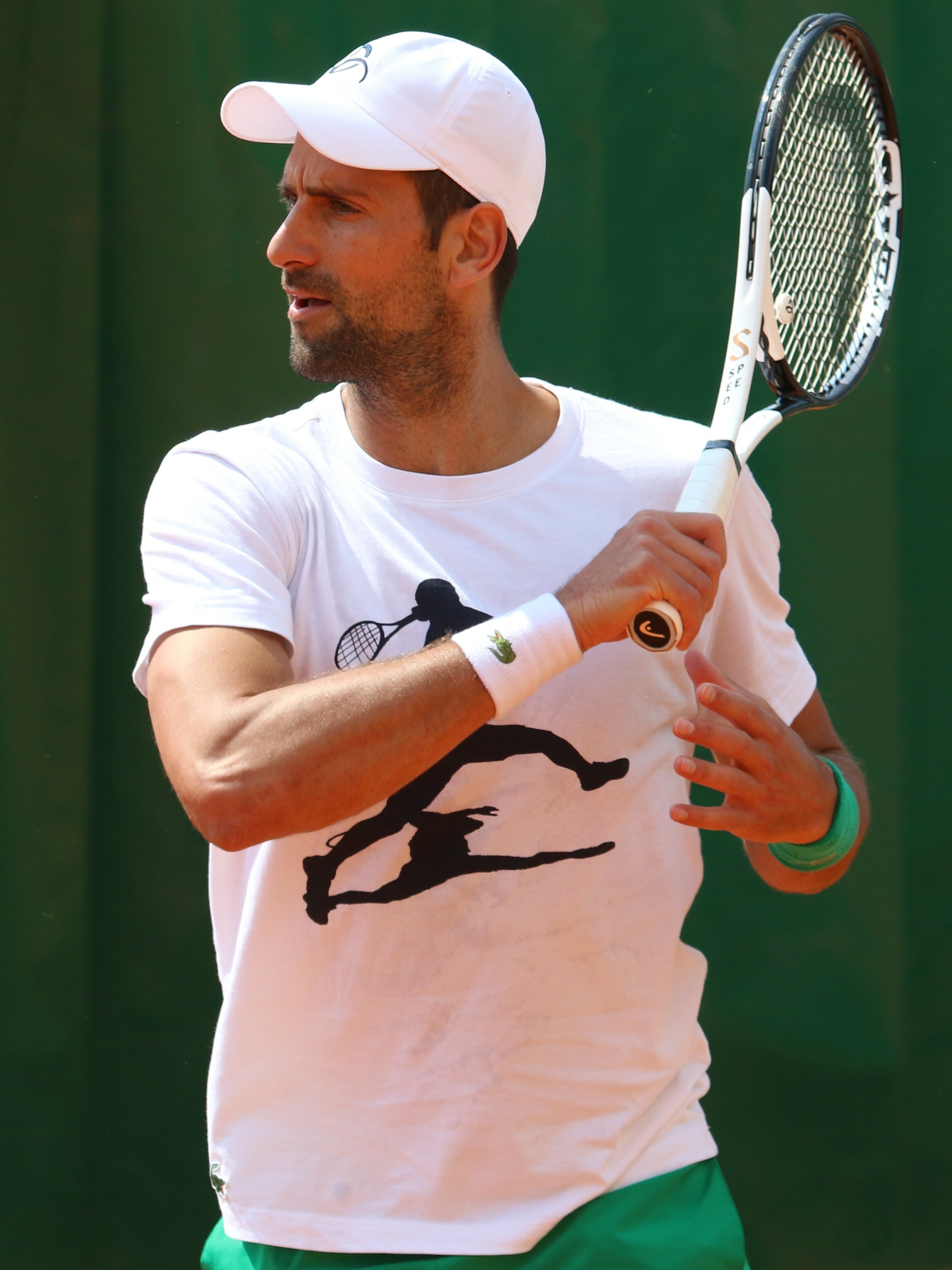
Novak Djokovic

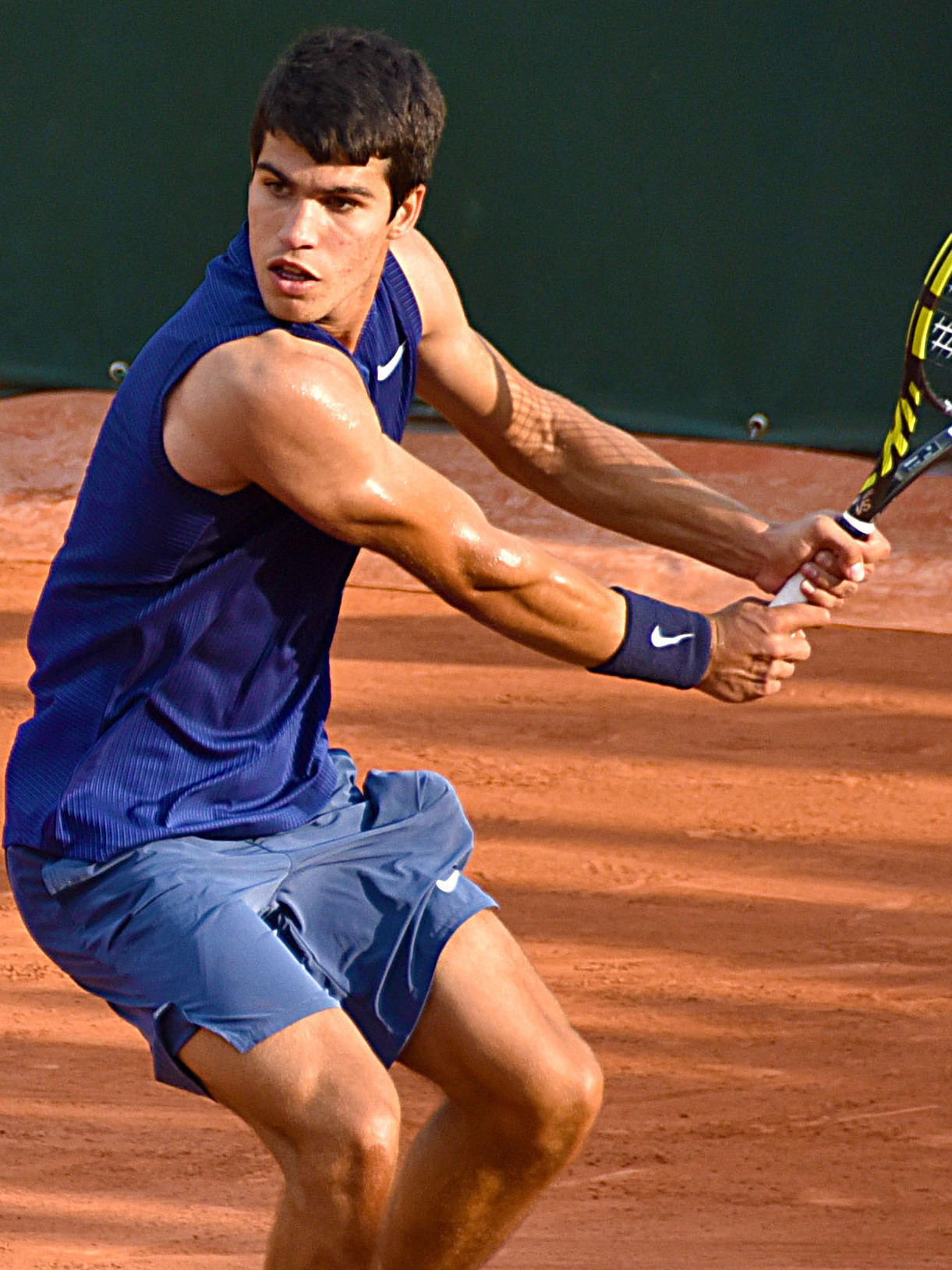
Carlos Alcaraz

Novak Djokovic's start to the 2023 season had been among the strongest of his career, winning the first two majors of the year, the Australian Open and French Open, for only the third time; by winning the latter, he broke Rafael Nadal's record of 22 men's major singles titles. Djokovic entered Wimbledon as the world No. 2, but was in contention for the top ranking if he reached the third round and outperformed Alcaraz.

Carlos Alcaraz was the reigning world No. 1 at the tournament, after swapping ranking positions with Djokovic multiple times earlier throughout the year. Alcaraz held the record for the youngest world No. 1, having claimed the top ranking after winning his first major title at the 2022 US Open. Going into Wimbledon, Alcaraz had not reached a major final since his US Open win; he missed the 2023 Australian Open due to injury, and was defeated by Djokovic in the semifinals of the French Open, after suffering from cramp. His only grass court title was his most recent entry, the 2023 Queen's Club Championships, an ATP 500 event that serves as a warm-up for Wimbledon.

Alcaraz and Djokovic had only met twice before on the ATP Tour: in the semifinals of the 2022 Madrid Open, where Alcaraz won in a best of three sets 6–7^{(5–7)}, 7–5, 7–6^{(8–6)}, and in the semifinals of the 2023 French Open, where Djokovic won 6–3, 5–7, 6–1, 6–1. They had never competed against each other on grass.

== Route to the final ==
Novak Djokovic entered the 2023 Wimbledon Championships as a seven-time overall and four-time defending champion, having won the 2011, 2014, 2015, 2018, 2019, 2021, and 2022 championships (no tournament was held in 2020 due to the COVID-19 pandemic). Widely regarded as one of the greatest players of his generation and of all time, Djokovic was a member of the Big Three group of tennis players who had dominated the Grand Slam tournaments since the mid-2000s—aside from Andy Murray (who was frequently included with the trio as the Big Four), no player outside of the group had won Wimbledon since Lleyton Hewitt in 2002.

Djokovic won his first three matches comfortably, defeating Pedro Cachin, Jordan Thompson, and Stan Wawrinka in straight sets. His fourth round match-up was his first of the tournament against a seeded player, 17th seed Hubert Hurkacz. Djokovic narrwowly won deciding tiebreaks in the first two sets, to lead 7–6^{(8–6)}, 7–6^{(8–6)}. In the third set, Hurkacz made the first break of the match, going on to win the set 7–5. Djokovic made the second and final break of the game at 3–3 in the fourth set, and both players held their serve. Djokovic won the fourth set 6–4, and progressed to the quarterfinals with a score of 7–6^{(8–6)}, 7–6^{(8–6)}, 5–7, 6–4. After losing the first set of the quarterfinal to Andrey Rublev, he won the next three, to set up a semifinal with Jannik Sinner. Djokovic defeated Sinner in straight sets to reach his fifth consecutive Wimbledon final, and his 35th major final overall.

The 2023 tournament was only Carlos Alcaraz's third appearance at Wimbledon, after fourth round and second round exists in 2022 and 2021, respectively. He won his first two matches in straight sets against Jérémy Chardy and Alexandre Müller, dropping his first set of the tournament in his third round match against Nicolás Jarry, whom he defeated 6–3, 6–7^{(6–8)}, 6–3, 7–5. Alcaraz lost the first set in his fourth round match against Matteo Berrettini, runner-up in 2021, but won the next three to progress to the quarterfinals with a score of 3–6, 6–3, 6–3, 6–3. He defeated Holger Rune and Daniil Medvedev in straight sets in the quarterfinals and semifinals respectively, to make his first appearance in a Wimbledon final.

Route to the final
(Spain) Carlos Alcaraz (1)			(Serbia) Novak Djokovic (2)	
Opponent	Score	Round	Opponent	Score
(France) Jérémy Chardy	6–0, 6–2, 7–5	1R	(Argentina) Pedro Cachin	6–3, 6–3, 7–6^{(7–4)}
(France) Alexandre Müller	6–4, 7–6^{(7–2)}, 6–3	2R	(Australia) Jordan Thompson	6–3, 7–6^{(7–4)},7–5
(Chile) Nicolás Jarry (25)	6–3, 6–7^{(6–8)}, 6–3, 7–5	3R	(Switzerland) Stan Wawrinka	6–3, 6–1, 7–6^{(7–5)}
(Italy) Matteo Berrettini	3–6, 6–3, 6–3, 6–3	4R	(Poland) Hubert Hurkacz	7–6^{(8–6)}, 7–6^{(8–6)}, 5–7, 6–4
(Denmark) Holger Rune (6)	7–6^{(7–3)}, 6–4, 6–4	QF	Andrey Rublev (7)	4–6, 6–1, 6–4, 6–3
Daniil Medvedev (3)	6–3, 6–3, 6–3	SF	(Italy) Jannik Sinner (8)	6–3, 6–4, 7–6^{(7–4)}

== Match summary ==
The match began at 14:00 BST (UTC+1). Alcaraz won the coin toss, and chose to receive first. Djokovic took an early lead, breaking Alcaraz's first two service games to take a 5–0 lead in the first set, after 27 minutes. Alcaraz won his next service game to bring the score to 5–1, before Djokovic won the set in the following game.

Having received last in the previous set, Alcaraz opened the serving in the second set. He won the first two games, breaking Djokovic's first service game of the set; however, Djokovic broke back and won his next service game, to level the set at 2–2. Neither player broke the other's serve for the remainder of the set, which was settled at 6–6 via a tiebreak which Alcaraz won 8–6, giving him his first set of the match.

The third set saw Alcaraz break in the first game, eventually climbing to a 3–1 lead. The fifth game of the set lasted 27 minutes with a total of 13 deuces, before Alcaraz eventually converted his seventh break point of the game and established a double break against Djokovic. He proceeded to win the next two games, breaking Djokovic for a third time to close out the set 6–1 and take the lead of the match for the first time.

Both players won their first two service games in the fourth set, before two unforced errors from Alcaraz allowed Djokovic to break his serve and lead the set 3–2. Djokovic would break Alcaraz' serve again and eventually win the set 6–3, levelling the match at 2–2 and forcing a deciding fifth and final set.

Alcaraz failed to convert a break point in the opening game of the final set, allowing Djokovic to defend his serve. The next game, Djokovic was also unable to convert a break point, after a defence from Alcaraz forced him into an error on a volley. At 1–1 with Djokovic serving, Alcaraz was able to set up and win a break point, firing a down-the-line backhand volley to break Djokovic in the final set. Following the break, Djokovic destroyed his racket by striking the net post with it, to the boos of the crowd. This would prove to be the final break point of the match, as both players won their remaining service games comfortably; as a result, Alcaraz won the final set 6–4, thereby winning the gentlemen's singles title, 1–6, 7–6^{(8–6)}, 6–1, 3–6, 6–4.

== Post-match ==
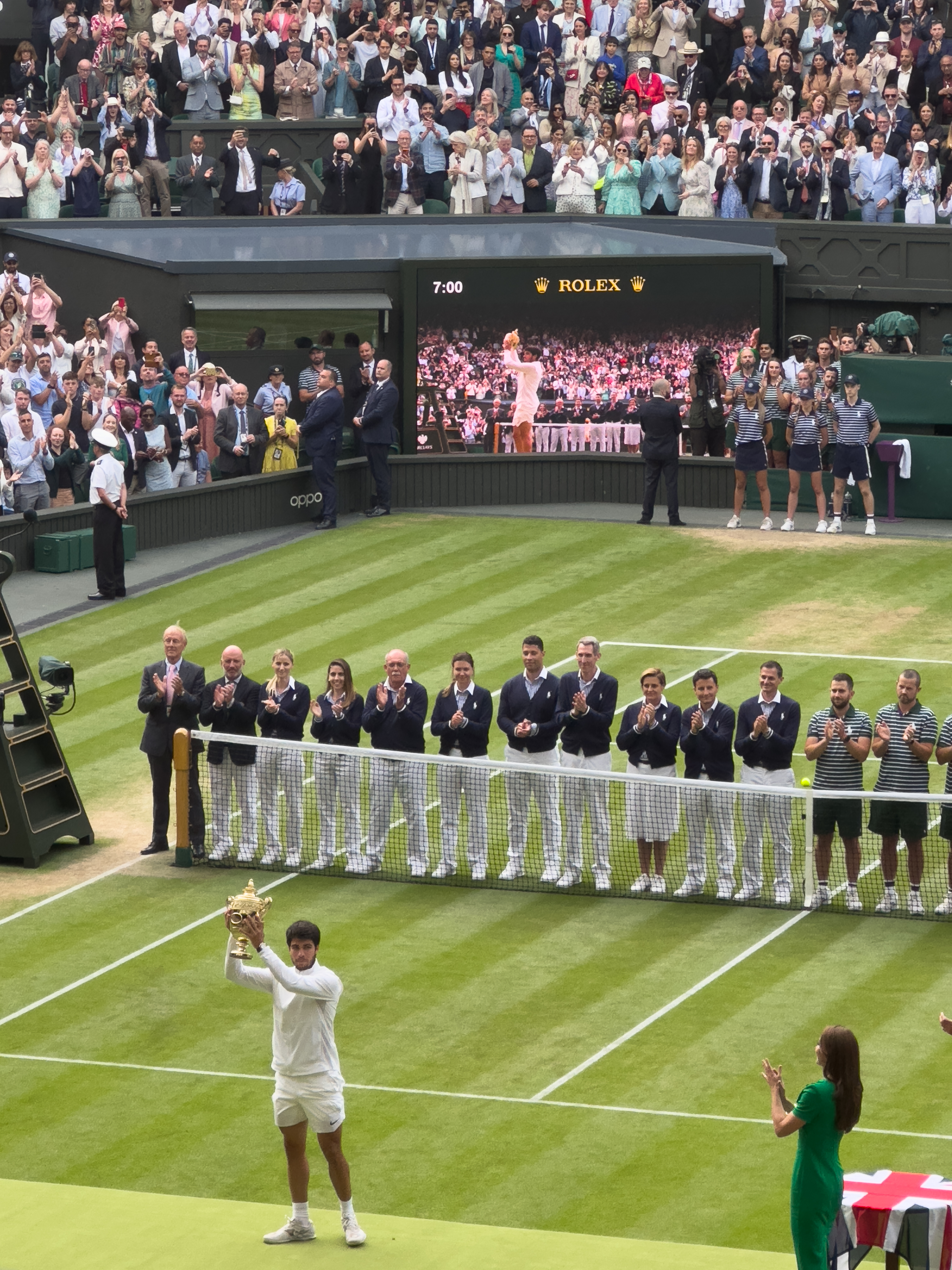
Carlos Alcaraz was presented with the Gentlemen's Singles Trophy by the Princess of Wales.

With his victory, Alcaraz became the first Wimbledon Champion outside of the Big Four since Lleyton Hewitt in 2002, and the third-youngest men's champion, behind Boris Becker and Björn Borg. It was Alcaraz's second Grand Slam title, making him the first man to win multiple Grand Slams since Stan Wawrinka in 2015. In his on-court interview, he called the title "a dream come true", while noting his own surprise at his performance for his age, further stating that "if I lost, I would have been proud of myself". He paid tribute to Djokovic's longevity in the sport, saying that "I started playing tennis watching you", and joked that "36 is the new 26".

Djokovic's loss ended his 45-match winning streak on Centre Court, which had lasted since his 2013 final defeat to Andy Murray. He had been vying for a fifth consecutive Wimbledon title (to match the Open Era record), and an eighth Wimbledon title overall, which would have equalled Roger Federer's all-time record. Djokovic described the loss as "tough one to swallow" in his on-court interview, but acknowledged that he had "lost to the better player" and that "it couldn't be better for our sport". Having only narrowly lost, he referenced his prior experiences of narrowly winning, saying that "this is kind of a fair-and-square deal I guess to lose a match like this for me here".

The match was praised for its competitiveness and quality of play, with various media outlets calling it "stunning" and "a final for the ages", with particularly praise for Alcaraz's recovery after losing the first set and quick adaptation to the grass surface overall. Lasting 4 hours and 42 minutes, it was the third longest Wimbledon final in history by duration, after the 2019 final—which Djokovic won—and the 2008 final.

This would prove to be Djokovic's only loss at the Grand Slam tournaments in 2023, as he went on to win the US Open in September. Djokovic defeated Alcaraz 5–7, 7–6^{(9–7)}, 7–6^{(7–4)} in their next match, the 2023 Cincinnati Open final. A rematch of the Wimbledon final would take place the following year, with Alcaraz successfully defending his title 6–2, 6–2, 7–6^{(7–4)}.

=== Attendance ===
Many celebrities and former tennis professionals attended the match, including King Felipe VI, Daniel Craig, Ariana Grande, Idris Elba, Rachel Weisz, Brad Pitt, Emma Watson, Jonathan Bailey, Priyanka Chopra, Nick Jonas, Shakira, Imogen Poots, James Norton, Stan Smith, Chris Evert, Annabel Croft, and Stefan Edberg.

Catherine, Princess of Wales was in attendance as patron of the All England Lawn Tennis and Croquet Club, along with her husband (William, Prince of Wales) and two of their three children—Prince George and Princess Charlotte. Prince Michael of Kent and a number of other British royal family members were also present.

== Statistics ==
Category	Alcaraz	Djokovic
Aces	9	2
Double faults	7	3
First serve points in	94–56	118–66
First serve points won	66–28	73–45
Second serve points won	28–28	37–29
Net points won	28–18	39–26
Break points won	5–14	5–10
Receiving points won	74–110	56–94
Winners	66	32
Unforced errors	45	40
Winners−UFE	+21	−8
Total points won	168	166
Total games won	23	23

== See also ==
- 2023 Wimbledon Championships – Men's singles
