= 2023 Rolex Paris Masters – Doubles =

Doubles
- 2023 Rolex Paris Masters

Final
- Champions: (Mexico) Santiago González (France) Édouard Roger-Vasselin
- Runners-up: (India) Rohan Bopanna (Australia) Matthew Ebden
- Score: 6–2, 5–7, [10–7]

Details
- Draw: 24
- Seeds: 8

Events
| Singles | Doubles |
- Rolex Paris Masters

Santiago González and Édouard Roger-Vasselin defeated Rohan Bopanna and Matthew Ebden in the final, 6–2, 5–7, [10–7] to win the doubles tennis title at the 2023 Paris Masters.

Wesley Koolhof and Neal Skupski were the defending champions, but lost in the quarterfinals to González and Roger-Vasselin.

Austin Krajicek and Skupski were in contention for the ATP No. 1 doubles ranking. Krajicek retained the top ranking by winning his first match.

== Seeds ==
All seeds received a bye into the second round.

1. (Croatia) Ivan Dodig / (United States) Austin Krajicek (quarterfinals)
2. (Netherlands) Wesley Koolhof / (United Kingdom) Neal Skupski (quarterfinals)
3. (India) Rohan Bopanna / (Australia) Matthew Ebden (final)
4. (United States) Rajeev Ram / (United Kingdom) Joe Salisbury (semifinals)
5. (Spain) Marcel Granollers / (Argentina) Horacio Zeballos (quarterfinals)
6. (Argentina) Máximo González / (Argentina) Andrés Molteni (second round)
7. (Mexico) Santiago González / (France) Édouard Roger-Vasselin (champions)
8. (El Salvador) Marcelo Arévalo / (Netherlands) Jean-Julien Rojer (second round)

== Draw ==
Key

- Q = Qualifier
- WC = Wild card
- LL = Lucky loser
- Alt = Alternate
- ITF = ITF entry
- PR = Protected ranking
- SR = Special ranking
- SE = Special exempt
- JE = Junior exempt
- JR = Junior Accelerator Programme entrant
- CO = College Accelerator Programme entrant
- NG = Next Gen Accelerator Program entrant
- w/o = Walkover
- r = Retired
- d = Defaulted

=== Finals ===
Semifinals
(Finland) Harri Heliövaara (Croatia) Mate Pavić | 7^{7} | 4 | [6]
3 | (India) Rohan Bopanna (Australia) Matthew Ebden | 6^{3} | 6 | [10]
4 | (United States) Rajeev Ram (United Kingdom) Joe Salisbury | 3 | 3
7 | (Mexico) Santiago González (France) Édouard Roger-Vasselin | 6 | 6

Final
3 | (India) Rohan Bopanna (Australia) Matthew Ebden | 2 | 7 | [7]
7 | (Mexico) Santiago González (France) Édouard Roger-Vasselin | 6 | 5 | [10]

=== Top half ===
First round
WC | (France) S Doumbia (France) F Reboul | 6^{8} | 6 | [12]
Alt | (Netherlands) M Middelkoop (Germany) A Mies | 7^{10} | 4 | [10]
(Finland) H Heliövaara (Croatia) M Pavić | 7^{9} | 6
(Monaco) H Nys (Poland) J Zieliński | 6^{7} | 4
Alt | (Ecuador) G Escobar (Kazakhstan) A Nedovyesov | 4 | 2
(Serbia) N Djokovic (Serbia) M Kecmanović | 6 | 6
(Germany) K Krawietz (Germany) T Pütz | 6^{5} | 3
Alt | (Austria) A Erler (Austria) L Miedler | 7^{7} | 6

Second round
1 | (Croatia) I Dodig (United States) A Krajicek | 3 | 6 | [10]
WC | (France) S Doumbia (France) F Reboul | 6 | 3 | [4]
(Finland) H Heliövaara (Croatia) M Pavić | 6 | 6
8 | (El Salvador) M Arévalo (Netherlands) J-J Rojer | 4 | 4
3 | (India) R Bopanna (Australia) M Ebden | w/o
(Serbia) N Djokovic (Serbia) M Kecmanović
Alt | (Austria) A Erler (Austria) L Miedler | 5 | 4
5 | (Spain) M Granollers (Argentina) H Zeballos | 7 | 6

Quarterfinals
1 | (Croatia) I Dodig (United States) A Krajicek | 4 | 4
(Finland) H Heliövaara (Croatia) M Pavić | 6 | 6
3 | (India) R Bopanna (Australia) M Ebden | 6 | 6
5 | (Spain) M Granollers (Argentina) H Zeballos | 3 | 2

Semifinals
(Finland) H Heliövaara (Croatia) M Pavić | 7^{7} | 4 | [6]
3 | (India) R Bopanna (Australia) M Ebden | 6^{3} | 6 | [10]

=== Bottom half ===
First round
(Brazil) M Melo (Germany) A Zverev | 6^{5} | 7 | [5]
(United States) N Lammons (United States) J Withrow | 7^{7} | 5 | [10]
(Canada) F Auger-Aliassime (United States) S Korda | 7 | 6
(Argentina) S Báez (Italy) L Musetti | 5 | 3
(Argentina) F Cerúndolo (Argentina) TM Etcheverry | 3 | 6^{4}
(United Kingdom) J Murray (New Zealand) M Venus | 6 | 7^{7}
(Belgium) S Gillé (Belgium) J Vliegen
K Khachanov; A Rublev | w/o

Second round
6 | (Argentina) M González (Argentina) A Molteni | 5 | 6^{5}
(United States) N Lammons (United States) J Withrow | 7 | 7^{7}
(Canada) F Auger-Aliassime (United States) S Korda
4 | (United States) R Ram (United Kingdom) J Salisbury | w/o
7 | (Mexico) S González (France) É Roger-Vasselin | 6 | 6
(United Kingdom) J Murray (New Zealand) M Venus | 4 | 3
K Khachanov; A Rublev | 4 | 6^{5}
2 | (Netherlands) W Koolhof (United Kingdom) N Skupski | 6 | 7^{7}

Quarterfinals
(United States) N Lammons (United States) J Withrow | 7^{7} | 6^{6} | [4]
4 | (United States) R Ram (United Kingdom) J Salisbury | 6^{4} | 7^{8} | [10]
7 | (Mexico) S González (France) É Roger-Vasselin | 6 | 6
2 | (Netherlands) W Koolhof (United Kingdom) N Skupski | 4 | 4

Semifinals
4 | (United States) R Ram (United Kingdom) J Salisbury | 3 | 3
7 | (Mexico) S González (France) É Roger-Vasselin | 6 | 6
