= 2023 Italian Open (tennis) =

- Date: 9–21 May
- Edition: 80th
- Draw: 96S / 32D
- Prize money: €7,705,780 (men) €3,572,618 (women)
- Surface: Clay / outdoor
- Location: Rome, Italy
- Venue: Foro Italico

Champions

Men's singles
- Daniil Medvedev

Women's singles
- (Kazakhstan) Elena Rybakina

Men's doubles
- (Monaco) Hugo Nys / (Poland) Jan Zieliński

Women's doubles
- (Australia) Storm Hunter / (Belgium) Elise Mertens
← 2022 ·	Italian Open	· 2024 →

The 2023 Italian Open (also known as the Rome Masters or the Internazionali BNL d'Italia for sponsorship reasons) was a professional tennis tournament currently played on outdoor clay courts at the Foro Italico in Rome, Italy. It was the 80th edition of the Italian Open and is classified as an ATP Tour Masters 1000 event on the 2023 ATP Tour and a WTA 1000 event on the 2023 WTA Tour that was non-mandatory but was upgraded from 900 to 1,000 points.

This was the first year that the tournament would be expanded to two weeks and the men's and women's singles draws were expanded to 96 players.

== Finals ==
=== Men's singles ===
- Daniil Medvedev defeated (Denmark) Holger Rune, 7–5, 7–5

=== Women's singles ===
- (Kazakhstan) Elena Rybakina defeated (Ukraine) Anhelina Kalinina, 6–4, 1–0, ret.

This was Rybakina's 5th WTA singles title, and second of the year.

=== Men's doubles ===
- (Monaco) Hugo Nys / (Poland) Jan Zieliński defeated (Netherlands) Robin Haase / (Netherlands) Botic van de Zandschulp, 7–5, 6–1

=== Women's doubles ===
- (Australia) Storm Hunter / (Belgium) Elise Mertens defeated (United States) Coco Gauff / (United States) Jessica Pegula, 6–4, 6–4

== Points and prize money ==
=== Point distribution ===
Event	W	F	SF	QF	Round of 16	Round of 32	Round of 64	Round of 96	Q	Q2	Q1
Men's singles	1000	600	360	180	90	45	25*	10	16	8	0
Men's doubles	1000	600	360	180	90	0	—	—	—	—	—
Women's singles	1000	650	390	215	120	65	35*	10	30	20	2
Women's doubles	1000	650	390	215	120	10	—	—	—	—	—

* Players with byes receive first round points.

=== Prize money ===
Event	W	F	SF	QF	Round of 16	Round of 32	Round of 64	Round of 96	Q2	Q1
Men's singles	€1,105,265	€580,000	€308,790	€161,525	€84,900	€48,835	€27,045	€16,340	€8,265	€4,510
Women's singles	€521,754	€272,200	€143,490	€73,930	€39,130	€22,700	€12,652	€7,828	€5,982	€3,110
Men's doubles*	€382,420	€202,850	€108,190	€54,840	€29,300	€15,780	—	—	—	—
Women's doubles*	€182,170	€96,430	€51,790	€25,900	€13,840	€7,590	—	—	—	—

_{*per team}
