= 2023 Rolex Paris Masters – Singles =

Singles
- 2023 Rolex Paris Masters

Final
- Champion: (Serbia) Novak Djokovic
- Runner-up: (Bulgaria) Grigor Dimitrov
- Score: 6–4, 6–3

Details
- Draw: 56 (7 Q / 4 WC )
- Seeds: 16

Events
Singles	Doubles
← 2022 ·	Rolex Paris Masters	· 2024 →

Novak Djokovic defeated Grigor Dimitrov in the final, 6–4, 6–3 to win the singles tennis title at the 2023 Paris Masters. It was his record-extending seventh Paris Masters title and record-extending 40th Masters title overall, and he extended his winning streak to 18 matches with the win (dating back to the Cincinnati Masters).

Holger Rune was the defending champion, but lost in the quarterfinals to Djokovic in a rematch of the previous year's final.

Djokovic and Carlos Alcaraz were in contention for the ATP No. 1 singles ranking. Djokovic retained the top ranking after Alcaraz lost in the second round.

== Seeds ==
The top eight seeds received a bye into the second round.

1. (Serbia) Novak Djokovic (champion)
2. (Spain) Carlos Alcaraz (second round)
3. Daniil Medvedev (second round)
4. (Italy) Jannik Sinner (third round, withdrew)
5. Andrey Rublev (semifinals)
6. (Denmark) Holger Rune (quarterfinals)
7. (Greece) Stefanos Tsitsipas (semifinals)
8. (Norway) Casper Ruud (second round)
9. (United States) Taylor Fritz (second round, withdrew)
10. (Germany) Alexander Zverev (third round)
11. (Poland) Hubert Hurkacz (quarterfinals)
12. (United States) Tommy Paul (second round)
13. (Australia) Alex de Minaur (quarterfinals)
14. (United States) Frances Tiafoe (first round)
15. (United States) Ben Shelton (first round)
16. Karen Khachanov (quarterfinals)

Click on the seed number of a player to go to their draw section.

== Draw ==
=== Key ===
- Q = Qualifier
- WC = Wild card
- LL = Lucky loser
- Alt = Alternate
- SE = Special exempt
- PR = Protected ranking
- ITF = ITF entry
- JE = Junior exempt
- w/o = Walkover
- r = Retired
- d = Defaulted
- SR = Special ranking

=== Finals ===
Quarterfinals
1	(Serbia) Novak Djokovic	7	6^{3}	6
6	(Denmark) Holger Rune	5	7^{7}	4
13	(Australia) Alex de Minaur	6	3	1
5	Andrey Rublev	4	6	6
11	(Poland) Hubert Hurkacz	1	6	4
(Bulgaria) Grigor Dimitrov	6	4	6
7	(Greece) Stefanos Tsitsipas	6	6
16	Karen Khachanov	3	4

Semifinals
1	(Serbia) Novak Djokovic	5	7^{7}	7
5	Andrey Rublev	7	6^{3}	5
(Bulgaria) Grigor Dimitrov	6	6^{1}	7^{7}
7	(Greece) Stefanos Tsitsipas	3	7^{7}	6^{3}

Final
1	(Serbia) Novak Djokovic	6	6
(Bulgaria) Grigor Dimitrov	4	3

=== Top half ===
==== Section 1 ====
First round
(Serbia) M Kecmanović	6	6^{6}	4
(Argentina) TM Etcheverry	4	7^{8}	6
(Netherlands) T Griekspoor	6^{2}	6	6
(United States) C Eubanks	7^{7}	3	4
(Spain) A Davidovich Fokina	7^{7}	5	6
15	(United States) B Shelton	6^{4}	7	3
9	(United States) T Fritz	6	6
(Argentina) S Báez	1	4
(Germany) D Altmaier	6	6
(France) A Fils	2	4
(Switzerland) S Wawrinka	6	3	5
Q	(Austria) D Thiem	3	6	7

Second round
1	(Serbia) N Djokovic	6	6
(Argentina) TM Etcheverry	3	2
(Netherlands) T Griekspoor	6	6
(Spain) A Davidovich Fokina	2	2
9	(United States) T Fritz
(Germany) D Altmaier	w/o
Q	(Austria) D Thiem	4	2
6	(Denmark) H Rune	6	6

Third round
1	(Serbia) N Djokovic	4	7^{7}	6
(Netherlands) T Griekspoor	6	6^{2}	4
(Germany) D Altmaier	3	3
6	(Denmark) H Rune	6	6

Quarterfinals
1	(Serbia) N Djokovic	7	6^{3}	6
6	(Denmark) H Rune	5	7^{7}	4

==== Section 2 ====
First round
Q	(United States) JJ Wolf	6	4	2
(United States) M McDonald	1	6	6
LL	(Serbia) D Lajović	7	6
WC	(France) B Bonzi	5	3
(United Kingdom) A Murray	6^{5}	6	5
13	(Australia) A de Minaur	7^{7}	4	7
12	(United States) T Paul	0	6	7^{8}
WC	(France) R Gasquet	6	2	6^{6}
Q	(Netherlands) B van de Zandschulp	6	7
(France) A Mannarino	4	5
LL	(Australia) J Thompson	6^{5}	6	2
Q	(Japan) Y Nishioka	7^{7}	4	6

Second round
4	(Italy) J Sinner	6^{6}	7	6
(United States) M McDonald	7^{8}	5	1
LL	(Serbia) D Lajović	6	4	4
13	(Australia) A de Minaur	4	6	6
12	(United States) T Paul	4	6	3
Q	(Netherlands) B van de Zandschulp	6	2	6
Q	(Japan) Y Nishioka	4	3
5	A Rublev	6	6

Third round
4	(Italy) J Sinner
13	(Australia) A de Minaur	w/o
Q	(Netherlands) B van de Zandschulp	3	3
5	A Rublev	6	6

Quarterfinals
13	(Australia) A de Minaur	6	3	1
5	A Rublev	4	6	6

=== Bottom half ===
==== Section 3 ====
First round
PR	(France) G Monfils	6	6^{2}	5
(Argentina) F Cerúndolo	4	7^{7}	7
(Czech Republic) J Lehečka	4	2
(Spain) R Bautista Agut	6	6
(United States) S Korda	3	7^{8}	3
11	(Poland) H Hurkacz	6	6^{6}	6
14	(United States) F Tiafoe	3	4
(Kazakhstan) A Bublik	6	6
(Chile) N Jarry	7	7^{8}
(Australia) A Popyrin	5	6^{6}
(Bulgaria) G Dimitrov	6	6^{4}	6
(Italy) L Musetti	2	7^{7}	3

Second round
8	(Norway) C Ruud	5	4
(Argentina) F Cerúndolo	7	6
(Spain) R Bautista Agut	3	2
11	(Poland) H Hurkacz	6	6
(Kazakhstan) A Bublik	7^{7}	7^{7}
(Chile) N Jarry	6^{3}	6^{3}
(Bulgaria) G Dimitrov	6	6^{4}	7^{7}
3	D Medvedev	3	7^{7}	6^{2}

Third round
(Argentina) F Cerúndolo	4	3
11	(Poland) H Hurkacz	6	6
(Kazakhstan) A Bublik	2	2
(Bulgaria) G Dimitrov	6	6

Quarterfinals
11	(Poland) H Hurkacz	1	6	4
(Bulgaria) G Dimitrov	6	4	6

==== Section 4 ====
First round
(Canada) F Auger-Aliassime	7^{7}	6
(Germany) J-L Struff	6^{3}	4
(France) U Humbert	6	6
Q	(United States) M Giron	4	3
Q	(Hungary) M Fucsovics	6	5	4
10	(Germany) A Zverev	4	7	6
16	K Khachanov	6	6
(Australia) M Purcell	4	4
(Serbia) L Djere	6^{6}	6	6
WC	(France) L Van Assche	7^{8}	4	4
WC	(France) A Müller	6^{4}	3
Q	R Safiullin	7^{7}	6

Second round
7	(Greece) S Tsitsipas	6	7^{7}
(Canada) F Auger-Aliassime	3	6^{4}
(France) U Humbert	4	7^{7}	6^{5}
10	(Germany) A Zverev	6	6^{3}	7^{7}
16	K Khachanov	6	7
(Serbia) L Djere	4	5
Q	R Safiullin	6	6
2	(Spain) C Alcaraz	3	4

Third round
7	(Greece) S Tsitsipas	7^{7}	6
10	(Germany) A Zverev	6^{2}	4
16	K Khachanov	4	6	6
Q	R Safiullin	6	4	2

Quarterfinals
7	(Greece) S Tsitsipas	6	6
16	K Khachanov	3	4

== Qualifying ==
=== Seeds ===
1. Roman Safiullin (qualified)
2. (Austria) Sebastian Ofner (qualifying competition)
3. (Germany) Daniel Altmaier (moved to main draw)
4. (Japan) Yoshihito Nishioka (qualified)
5. (Germany) Yannick Hanfmann (first round)
6. (Italy) Lorenzo Sonego (first round)
7. (Serbia) Dušan Lajović (qualifying competition, lucky loser)
8. (Hungary) Márton Fucsovics (qualified)
9. (Australia) Aleksandar Vukic (withdrew)
10. (United States) Marcos Giron (qualified)
11. (Australia) Jordan Thompson (qualifying competition, lucky loser)
12. (Australia) Christopher O'Connell (qualifying competition)
13. (Spain) Roberto Carballés Baena (qualifying competition)
14. (Netherlands) Botic van de Zandschulp (qualified)

=== Qualifiers ===
1. Roman Safiullin
2. (Netherlands) Botic van de Zandschulp
3. (United States) J. J. Wolf
4. (Japan) Yoshihito Nishioka
5. (Hungary) Márton Fucsovics
6. (Austria) Dominic Thiem
7. (United States) Marcos Giron

=== Lucky losers ===
1. (Serbia) Dušan Lajović
2. (Australia) Jordan Thompson

=== Draw ===
==== First qualifier ====
First round
1	Roman Safiullin	6	6
WC	(France) Arthur Cazaux	4	2
(Brazil) Thiago Seyboth Wild	4	1
11	(Australia) Jordan Thompson	6	6

Qualifying competition
1	Roman Safiullin	3	6	6
11	(Australia) Jordan Thompson	6	4	4

==== Second qualifier ====
First round
2	(Austria) Sebastian Ofner	5	7	6
WC	(France) Térence Atmane	7	5	4
(Argentina) Pedro Cachin	2	4
14	(Netherlands) Botic van de Zandschulp	6	6

Qualifying competition
2	(Austria) Sebastian Ofner	6^{7}	2
14	(Netherlands) Botic van de Zandschulp	7^{9}	6

==== Third qualifier ====
First round
Alt	(United States) J. J. Wolf	6	2
(Spain) Bernabé Zapata Miralles	1	0^{r}
(Peru) Juan Pablo Varillas	4	2
13	(Spain) Roberto Carballés Baena	6	6

Qualifying competition
Alt	(United States) J. J. Wolf	6	6
13	(Spain) Roberto Carballés Baena	3	4

==== Fourth qualifier ====
First round
4	(Japan) Yoshihito Nishioka	3	7^{7}	6
WC	(France) Titouan Droguet	6	6^{4}	2
WC	(France) Giovanni Mpetshi Perricard	4	7^{10}	3
Alt	(Japan) Yosuke Watanuki	6	6^{8}	6

Qualifying competition
4	(Japan) Yoshihito Nishioka	6	6
Alt	(Japan) Yosuke Watanuki	4	4

==== Fifth qualifier ====
First round
5	(Germany) Yannick Hanfmann	4	7^{7}	4
(France) Grégoire Barrère	6	6^{3}	6
(Finland) Emil Ruusuvuori	4	2
8	(Hungary) Márton Fucsovics	6	6

Qualifying competition
(France) Grégoire Barrère	5	2
8	(Hungary) Márton Fucsovics	7	6

==== Sixth qualifier ====
First round
6	(Italy) Lorenzo Sonego	1	6	5
(Austria) Dominic Thiem	6	4	7
(France) Arthur Rinderknech	6	6^{5}	3
12	(Australia) Christopher O'Connell	4	7^{7}	6

Qualifying competition
(Austria) Dominic Thiem	6	6
12	(Australia) Christopher O'Connell	4	3

==== Seventh qualifier ====
First round
7	(Serbia) Dušan Lajović	3	7	7^{7}
(France) Quentin Halys	6	5	6^{0}
(Germany) Dominik Koepfer	6^{5}	3
10/Alt	(United States) Marcos Giron	7^{7}	6

Qualifying competition
7	(Serbia) Dušan Lajović	5	7	6^{4}
10/Alt	(United States) Marcos Giron	7	5	7^{7}
