= 2023 Rolex Paris Masters =

- Date: 30 October – 5 November
- Edition: 51st
- Category: ATP Tour Masters 1000
- Draw: 56S / 24D
- Prize money: €5,779,335
- Surface: Hard (indoor)
- Location: Paris, France
- Venue: Accor Arena

Champions

Singles
- (Serbia) Novak Djokovic

Doubles
- (Mexico) Santiago González / (France) Édouard Roger-Vasselin
- Paris Masters

The 2023 Rolex Paris Masters was a professional men's tennis tournament played on indoor hard courts. It was the 51st edition of this Masters 1000 event on the 2023 ATP Tour. It took place at the Accor Arena in Paris from 30 October to 5 November 2023.

== Champions ==
=== Singles ===
- (Serbia) Novak Djokovic def. (Bulgaria) Grigor Dimitrov, 6–4, 6–3
- It was Djokovic's 6th title of the year and the 97th of his career.

=== Doubles ===
- (Mexico) Santiago González / (France) Édouard Roger-Vasselin def. (India) Rohan Bopanna / (Australia) Matthew Ebden, 6–2, 5–7, [10–7]

== Points and prize money ==
=== Point distribution ===
Event	W	F	SF	QF	Round of 16	Round of 32	Round of 64	Q	Q2	Q1
Men's Singles	1,000	600	360	180	90	45	10	25	16	0
Men's Doubles	1,000	600	360	180	90	0	—N/a	—N/a	—N/a	—N/a

=== Prize money ===
Event	W	F	SF	QF	Round of 16	Round of 32	Round of 64	Q2	Q1
Men's Singles	€892,590	€487,420	€266,530	€145,380	€77,760	€41,700	€23,100	€11,830	€6,200
Men's Doubles*	€301,990	€157,820	€83,400	€46,210	€25,360	€14,080	—N/a	—N/a	—N/a

_{*per team}

== Singles main-draw entrants ==
=== Seeds ===
The following are the seeded players, based on ATP rankings as of 23 October 2023. Rankings and points before are as of 30 October 2023.

Seed	Rank	Player	Points before	Points defending	Points won	Points after	Status
1	1	(Serbia) Novak Djokovic	11,045	600	1,000	11,445	Champion, defeated (Bulgaria) Grigor Dimitrov
2	2	(Spain) Carlos Alcaraz	8,625	180	10	8,455	Second round lost to Roman Safiullin [Q]
3	3	Daniil Medvedev	7,200	10	10	7,200	Second round lost to (Bulgaria) Grigor Dimitrov
4	4	(Italy) Jannik Sinner	5,410	10	90	5,490	Third round withdrew
5	5	Andrey Rublev	4,935	90	360	5,205	Semifinals lost to (Serbia) Novak Djokovic [1]
6	7	(Denmark) Holger Rune	4,280	1,000	180	3,460	Quarterfinals lost to (Serbia) Novak Djokovic [1]
7	6	(Greece) Stefanos Tsitsipas	4,435	360	360	4,435	Semifinals lost to (Bulgaria) Grigor Dimitrov
8	8	(Norway) Casper Ruud	3,705	90	10	3,625	Second round lost to (Argentina) Francisco Cerúndolo
9	10	(United States) Taylor Fritz	3,500	45	45	3,500	Second round withdrew due to abdominal injury
10	9	(Germany) Alexander Zverev	3,540	(45)^{†}	90	3,585	Third round lost to (Greece) Stefanos Tsitsipas [7]
11	11	(Poland) Hubert Hurkacz	3,110	45	180	3,245	Quarterfinals lost to (Bulgaria) Grigor Dimitrov
12	12	(United States) Tommy Paul	2,800	180	45	2,665	Second round lost to (Netherlands) Botic van de Zandschulp [Q]
13	13	(Australia) Alex de Minaur	2,650	90	180	2,740	Quarterfinals lost to Andrey Rublev [5]
14	14	(United States) Frances Tiafoe	2,480	180	10	2,310	First round lost to (Kazakhstan) Alexander Bublik
15	16	(United States) Ben Shelton	2,355	(80)^{‡}	10	2,285	First round lost to (Spain) Alejandro Davidovich Fokina
16	15	Karen Khachanov	2,385	90	180	2,475	Quarterfinals lost to (Greece) Stefanos Tsitsipas [7]

† The player did not play the 2022 tournament due to injury and was not required to count it in his ranking as of 30 October 2023. Accordingly, points from his 19th best tournament has been deducted instead.
‡ The player did not enter to the tournament in 2022. His defending points from a 2022 ATP Challenger Tour event (Charlottesville) has been deducted instead.

=== Other entrants ===
The following players received wildcards into the singles main draw:

- (France) Benjamin Bonzi
- (France) Richard Gasquet
- (France) Alexandre Müller
- (France) Luca Van Assche

The following player received entry using a protected ranking:

- (France) Gaël Monfils

The following players received entry from the qualifying draw:

- (Hungary) Márton Fucsovics
- (United States) Marcos Giron
- (Japan) Yoshihito Nishioka
- Roman Safiullin
- (Austria) Dominic Thiem
- (Netherlands) Botic van de Zandschulp
- (United States) J. J. Wolf

The following players received entry as lucky losers:

- (Serbia) Dušan Lajović
- (Australia) Jordan Thompson

=== Withdrawals ===
- (Italy) Matteo Arnaldi → replaced by (Australia) Jordan Thompson
- (Spain) Pablo Carreño Busta → replaced by (Serbia) Miomir Kecmanović
- (Croatia) Borna Ćorić → replaced by (Australia) Alexei Popyrin
- (United Kingdom) Dan Evans → replaced by (Switzerland) Stan Wawrinka
- (United Kingdom) Cameron Norrie → replaced by (Serbia) Dušan Lajović
- (Canada) Denis Shapovalov → replaced by (France) Arthur Fils

== Doubles main-draw entrants ==
=== Seeds ===
Country	Player	Country	Player	Rank^{1}	Seed
CRO	Ivan Dodig	USA	Austin Krajicek	3	1
NED	Wesley Koolhof	GBR	Neal Skupski	7	2
IND	Rohan Bopanna	AUS	Matthew Ebden	11	3
USA	Rajeev Ram	GBR	Joe Salisbury	15	4
ESP	Marcel Granollers	ARG	Horacio Zeballos	19	5
ARG	Máximo González	ARG	Andrés Molteni	23	6
MEX	Santiago González	FRA	Édouard Roger-Vasselin	27	7
ESA	Marcelo Arévalo	NED	Jean-Julien Rojer	33	8

- Rankings are as of 23 October 2023.

=== Other entrants ===
The following pairs received wildcards into the doubles main draw:

- (France) Sadio Doumbia / (France) Fabien Reboul
- ~~(France) Arthur Fils / (France) Richard Gasquet~~

The following pair received entry as alternates:

- (Austria) Alexander Erler / (Austria) Lucas Miedler
- (Ecuador) Gonzalo Escobar / (Kazakhstan) Aleksandr Nedovyesov
- (Netherlands) Matwé Middelkoop / (Germany) Andreas Mies

=== Withdrawals ===
- (France) Arthur Fils / (France) Richard Gasquet → replaced by (Netherlands) Matwé Middelkoop / (Germany) Andreas Mies
- (Czech Republic) Jiří Lehečka / (United States) Ben Shelton → replaced by (Austria) Alexander Erler / (Austria) Lucas Miedler
- (Italy) Jannik Sinner / (Switzerland) Stan Wawrinka → replaced by (Ecuador) Gonzalo Escobar / (Kazakhstan) Aleksandr Nedovyesov
