= 2023 Daniil Medvedev tennis season =

Tennis tournament

- Full name: Daniil Medvedev
- Country: Russia (not allowed to play under the Russian flag)
- Calendar prize money: $11,548,023

Singles
- Season record: 66–18
- Calendar titles: 5
- Year-end ranking: No. 3
- Ranking change from previous year: ▲4

Grand Slam & significant results
- Australian Open: 3R
- French Open: 1R
- Wimbledon: SF
- US Open: F

Doubles
- Season record: 0–0
- Ranking change from previous year: Steady

The 2023 Daniil Medvedev tennis season officially began on 1 January 2023, with the start of the Adelaide International, and ended 18 November 2023 after defeat by Jannik Sinner in the semifinals of the ATP Finals.

== Yearly summary ==
=== Early hard court season ===
==== Australian Open ====
Medvedev was a defending finalist, he lost to Sebastian Korda on the third round with a dazzling straight-sets upset, falling out of top 10 since August 2019.

==== Rotterdam Open ====
Daniil Medvedev defeated Jannik Sinner in straight sets to win the 2023 Rotterdam Open for the first time.

==== Qatar Open ====
Daniil Medvedev defeated Andy Murray in straight sets to win his second consecutive title of the 2023 season.

==== Dubai Tennis Championships ====
Daniil Medvedev defeated Andrey Rublev to win his third consecutive title of the 2023 season.

==== Indian Wells Masters ====
Medvedev rolled his ankle in his fourth-round victory against Alexander Zverev and then cut his thumb badly in his quarter-final win against Alejandro Davidovich Fokina. After overcoming those challenges and then defeating Frances Tiafoe in semi final, he lost to Carlos Alcaraz in final. He became the first Russian to make it to an Indian Wells final since Andrei Chesnokov in 1992.

==== Miami Open ====
Medvedev defeated Jannik Sinner in straight sets to win his 5th Masters title in Miami Open and the first Russian to win the Miami since Nikolay Davydenko in 2008. Daniil became only the 8th man to win more than 5 different Masters titles on the ATP Tour.

=== Clay Court Season ===
==== Monte-Carlo Masters ====
Daniil Medvedev lost in straight sets to Holger Rune in the Quarter-final of the 2023 Monte-Carlo Masters. He made his sixth consecutive Quarter-final of the season.

==== Barcelona Open ====
Medvedev withdrew from Barcelona Open.

Announcing his withdrawal from the Barcelona Open, Medvedev said:

I’m really sorry I won’t be able to play Barcelona this year. I have amazing memories from the last time I played in 2019. I hope to be back next year and hopefully play good there.

— tennisworldusa

==== Madrid Open ====
He lost in the fourth round to compatriot Aslan Karatsev in straight sets.

==== Italian Open ====
Daniil Medvedev won his sixth career Masters title and his second Masters title of the 2023 season by defeating Holger Rune in straight sets. He became the first Russian man to ever win the Italian Open and only the third man to win both the Miami Open and Italian Open in the same season. He also won his maiden Clay Masters title and first Clay title in general.

With this win Daniil Medvedev reached world No. 2 and continued to lead the ATP race.

==== French Open ====
Daniil Medvedev was knocked out by the Brazilian and world 172 Thiago Seyboth Wild in the first round of Roland Garros.

=== Grass Court Season ===
==== Libéma Open ====
Daniil Medvedev lost to Adrian Mannarino in the second round of the Libéma Open

==== Halle Open ====
Daniil Medvedev lost in the quarterfinals to the Spaniard Roberto Bautista Agut at the 2023 Halle Open.

== All matches ==
This table chronicles all the matches of Daniil Medvedev in 2023.

Key
W	F	SF	QF	#R	RR	Q#	P#	DNQ	A	Z#	PO	G	S	B	NMS	NTI	P	NH

(W) winner; (F) finalist; (SF) semifinalist; (QF) quarterfinalist; (#R) rounds 4, 3, 2, 1; (RR) round-robin stage; (Q#) qualification round; (P#) preliminary round; (DNQ) did not qualify; (A) absent; (Z#) Davis/Fed Cup Zonal Group (with number indication) or (PO) play-off; (G) gold, (S) silver or (B) bronze Olympic/Paralympic medal; (NMS) not a Masters tournament; (NTI) not a Tier I tournament; (P) postponed; (NH) not held; (SR) strike rate (events won / competed); (W–L) win–loss record.
To avoid confusion and double counting, these charts are updated at the conclusion of a tournament or when the player's participation has ended.

=== Singles matches ===
Tournament	Match	Round	Opponent (seed or key)	Rank	Result	Score
Adelaide International 1 Adelaide, Australia; ATP 250; Hard, outdoor 1 – 8 January 2023
Adelaide International 1 Adelaide, Australia; ATP 250; Hard, outdoor 1 – 8 January 2023	1 / 386	1R	(Italy) Lorenzo Sonego	45	Win	7–6^{(8–6)}, 2–1 ret.
Adelaide International 1 Adelaide, Australia; ATP 250; Hard, outdoor 1 – 8 January 2023	2 / 387	2R	(Serbia) Miomir Kecmanović	29	Win	6–0, 6–3
Adelaide International 1 Adelaide, Australia; ATP 250; Hard, outdoor 1 – 8 January 2023	3 / 388	QF	Karen Khachanov (8)	20	Win	6–3, 6–3
Adelaide International 1 Adelaide, Australia; ATP 250; Hard, outdoor 1 – 8 January 2023	4 / 389	SF	(Serbia) Novak Djokovic (1)	5	Loss	3–6, 4–6
Australian Open; Melbourne, Australia; Grand Slam tournament Hard, outdoor 16 – 29 January 2023
Australian Open; Melbourne, Australia; Grand Slam tournament Hard, outdoor 16 – 29 January 2023	5 / 390	1R	(United States) Marcos Giron	56	Win	6–0, 6–1, 6–2
Australian Open; Melbourne, Australia; Grand Slam tournament Hard, outdoor 16 – 29 January 2023	6 / 391	2R	(Australia) John Millman (WC)	140	Win	7–5, 6–2, 6–2
Australian Open; Melbourne, Australia; Grand Slam tournament Hard, outdoor 16 – 29 January 2023	7 / 392	3R	(United States) Sebastian Korda (29)	31	Loss	6–7^{(7–9)}, 3–6, 6–7^{(4–7)}
Rotterdam Open; Rotterdam, Netherlands; ATP 500; Hard, indoor 13 – 19 February 2023
Rotterdam Open; Rotterdam, Netherlands; ATP 500; Hard, indoor 13 – 19 February 2023	8 / 393	1R	(Spain) Alejandro Davidovich Fokina	31	Win	4–6, 6–2, 6–2
Rotterdam Open; Rotterdam, Netherlands; ATP 500; Hard, indoor 13 – 19 February 2023	9 / 394	2R	(Netherlands) Botic van de Zandschulp	35	Win	6–2, 6–2
Rotterdam Open; Rotterdam, Netherlands; ATP 500; Hard, indoor 13 – 19 February 2023	10 / 395	QF	(Canada) Félix Auger-Aliassime (3)	8	Win	6–2, 6–4
Rotterdam Open; Rotterdam, Netherlands; ATP 500; Hard, indoor 13 – 19 February 2023	11 / 396	SF	(Bulgaria) Grigor Dimitrov	28	Win	6–1, 6–2
Rotterdam Open; Rotterdam, Netherlands; ATP 500; Hard, indoor 13 – 19 February 2023	12 / 397	W	(Italy) Jannik Sinner	14	Win (1)	5–7, 6–2, 6–2
Qatar Open; Doha, Qatar; ATP 250; Hard, outdoor 20 – 25 February 2023
Qatar Open; Doha, Qatar; ATP 250; Hard, outdoor 20 – 25 February 2023	–	1R	Bye			
Qatar Open; Doha, Qatar; ATP 250; Hard, outdoor 20 – 25 February 2023	13 / 398	2R	(United Kingdom) Liam Broady (Q)	147	Win	6–4, 6–3
Qatar Open; Doha, Qatar; ATP 250; Hard, outdoor 20 – 25 February 2023	14 / 399	QF	(Australia) Christopher O'Connell	94	Win	6–2, 4–6, 7–5
Qatar Open; Doha, Qatar; ATP 250; Hard, outdoor 20 – 25 February 2023	15 / 400	SF	(Canada) Félix Auger-Aliassime (2)	9	Win	6–4, 7–6^{(9–7)}
Qatar Open; Doha, Qatar; ATP 250; Hard, outdoor 20 – 25 February 2023	16 / 401	W	(United Kingdom) Andy Murray (WC)	70	Win (2)	6–4, 6–4
Dubai Tennis Championships; Dubai, United Arab Emirates; ATP 500; Hard, outdoor 27 February – 4 March 2023
Dubai Tennis Championships; Dubai, United Arab Emirates; ATP 500; Hard, outdoor 27 February – 4 March 2023	17 / 402	1R	(Italy) Matteo Arnaldi (Q)	111	Win	6–4, 6–2
Dubai Tennis Championships; Dubai, United Arab Emirates; ATP 500; Hard, outdoor 27 February – 4 March 2023	18 / 403	2R	(Kazakhstan) Alexander Bublik	46	Win	6–4, 6–2
Dubai Tennis Championships; Dubai, United Arab Emirates; ATP 500; Hard, outdoor 27 February – 4 March 2023	19 / 404	QF	(Croatia) Borna Ćorić (8)	20	Win	6–3, 6–2
Dubai Tennis Championships; Dubai, United Arab Emirates; ATP 500; Hard, outdoor 27 February – 4 March 2023	20 / 405	SF	(Serbia) Novak Djokovic (1)	1	Win	6–4, 6–4
Dubai Tennis Championships; Dubai, United Arab Emirates; ATP 500; Hard, outdoor 27 February – 4 March 2023	21 / 406	W	Andrey Rublev (2)	6	Win (3)	6–2, 6–2
Indian Wells Masters; Indian Wells, United States; ATP 1000; Hard, outdoor 8 – 19 March 2023
Indian Wells Masters; Indian Wells, United States; ATP 1000; Hard, outdoor 8 – 19 March 2023	–	1R	Bye			
Indian Wells Masters; Indian Wells, United States; ATP 1000; Hard, outdoor 8 – 19 March 2023	22 / 407	2R	(United States) Brandon Nakashima	48	Win	6–4, 6–3
Indian Wells Masters; Indian Wells, United States; ATP 1000; Hard, outdoor 8 – 19 March 2023	23 / 408	3R	Ilya Ivashka	85	Win	6–2, 3–6, 6–1
Indian Wells Masters; Indian Wells, United States; ATP 1000; Hard, outdoor 8 – 19 March 2023	24 / 409	4R	(Germany) Alexander Zverev (12)	14	Win	6–7^{(5–7)}, 7–6^{(7–5)}, 7–5
Indian Wells Masters; Indian Wells, United States; ATP 1000; Hard, outdoor 8 – 19 March 2023	25 / 410	QF	(Spain) Alejandro Davidovich Fokina (23)	28	Win	6–3, 7–5
Indian Wells Masters; Indian Wells, United States; ATP 1000; Hard, outdoor 8 – 19 March 2023	26 / 411	SF	(United States) Frances Tiafoe (14)	16	Win	7–5, 7–6^{(7–4)}
Indian Wells Masters; Indian Wells, United States; ATP 1000; Hard, outdoor 8 – 19 March 2023	27 / 412	F	(Spain) Carlos Alcaraz (1)	2	Loss	3–6, 2–6
Miami Open; Miami Gardens, United States; ATP 1000; Hard, outdoor 22 – 2 April 2023
Miami Open; Miami Gardens, United States; ATP 1000; Hard, outdoor 22 – 2 April 2023	–	1R	Bye			
Miami Open; Miami Gardens, United States; ATP 1000; Hard, outdoor 22 – 2 April 2023	28 / 413	2R	(Spain) Roberto Carballés Baena	84	Win	6–1, 6–2
Miami Open; Miami Gardens, United States; ATP 1000; Hard, outdoor 22 – 2 April 2023	–	3R	(Slovakia) Alex Molčan	56	Walkover	N/A
Miami Open; Miami Gardens, United States; ATP 1000; Hard, outdoor 22 – 2 April 2023	29 / 414	4R	(France) Quentin Halys	79	Win	6–4, 6–2
Miami Open; Miami Gardens, United States; ATP 1000; Hard, outdoor 22 – 2 April 2023	30 / 415	QF	(United States) Christopher Eubanks (Q)	119	Win	6–3, 7–5
Miami Open; Miami Gardens, United States; ATP 1000; Hard, outdoor 22 – 2 April 2023	31 / 416	SF	Karen Khachanov (14)	16	Win	7–6^{(7–5)}, 3–6, 6–3
Miami Open; Miami Gardens, United States; ATP 1000; Hard, outdoor 22 – 2 April 2023	32 / 417	W	(Italy) Jannik Sinner (10)	11	Win (4)	7–5, 6–3
Monte-Carlo Masters; Roquebrune-Cap-Martin, France; ATP 1000; Clay, outdoor 9 – 16 April 2023
Monte-Carlo Masters; Roquebrune-Cap-Martin, France; ATP 1000; Clay, outdoor 9 – 16 April 2023	–	1R	Bye			
Monte-Carlo Masters; Roquebrune-Cap-Martin, France; ATP 1000; Clay, outdoor 9 – 16 April 2023	33 / 418	2R	(Italy) Lorenzo Sonego (WC)	45	Win	6–3, 6–2
Monte-Carlo Masters; Roquebrune-Cap-Martin, France; ATP 1000; Clay, outdoor 9 – 16 April 2023	34 / 419	3R	(Germany) Alexander Zverev (13)	16	Win	3–6, 7–5, 7–6^{(9–7)}
Monte-Carlo Masters; Roquebrune-Cap-Martin, France; ATP 1000; Clay, outdoor 9 – 16 April 2023	35 / 420	QF	(Denmark) Holger Rune (6)	9	Loss	3–6, 4–6
Barcelona Open; Barcelona, Spain; ATP 500; Clay, outdoor 17 – 23 April 2023
Barcelona Open; Barcelona, Spain; ATP 500; Clay, outdoor 17 – 23 April 2023	Withdrew					
Madrid Open; Madrid, Spain; ATP 1000; Clay, outdoor 26 April – 7 May 2023
Madrid Open; Madrid, Spain; ATP 1000; Clay, outdoor 26 April – 7 May 2023	–	1R	Bye			
Madrid Open; Madrid, Spain; ATP 1000; Clay, outdoor 26 April – 7 May 2023	36 / 421	2R	(Italy) Andrea Vavassori (Q)	164	Win	6–4, 6–3
Madrid Open; Madrid, Spain; ATP 1000; Clay, outdoor 26 April – 7 May 2023	37 / 422	3R	Alexander Shevchenko (Q)	96	Win	4–6, 6–1, 7–5
Madrid Open; Madrid, Spain; ATP 1000; Clay, outdoor 26 April – 7 May 2023	38 / 423	4R	Aslan Karatsev (Q)	121	Loss	6–7^{(1–7)}, 4–6
Italian Open; Rome, Italy; ATP 1000; Clay, outdoor 10 – 21 May 2023
Italian Open; Rome, Italy; ATP 1000; Clay, outdoor 10 – 21 May 2023	–	1R	Bye			
Italian Open; Rome, Italy; ATP 1000; Clay, outdoor 10 – 21 May 2023	39 / 424	2R	(Finland) Emil Ruusuvuori	43	Win	6–4, 6–2
Italian Open; Rome, Italy; ATP 1000; Clay, outdoor 10 – 21 May 2023	40 / 425	3R	(Spain) Bernabé Zapata Miralles (31)	38	Win	3–6, 6–1, 6–3
Italian Open; Rome, Italy; ATP 1000; Clay, outdoor 10 – 21 May 2023	41 / 426	4R	(Germany) Alexander Zverev (19)	22	Win	6–2, 7–6^{(7–3)}
Italian Open; Rome, Italy; ATP 1000; Clay, outdoor 10 – 21 May 2023	42 / 427	QF	(Germany) Yannick Hanfmann (Q)	101	Win	6–2, 6–2
Italian Open; Rome, Italy; ATP 1000; Clay, outdoor 10 – 21 May 2023	43 / 428	SF	(Greece) Stefanos Tsitsipas (5)	5	Win	7–5, 7–5
Italian Open; Rome, Italy; ATP 1000; Clay, outdoor 10 – 21 May 2023	44 / 429	W	(Denmark) Holger Rune (7)	7	Win (5)	7–5, 7–5
French Open; Paris, France; Grand Slam tournament Clay, outdoor 28 May – 11 June 2023
French Open; Paris, France; Grand Slam tournament Clay, outdoor 28 May – 11 June 2023	45 / 430	1R	(Brazil) Thiago Seyboth Wild (Q)	172	Loss	6–7^{(5–7)}, 7–6^{(8–6)}, 6–2, 3–6, 4–6
Libéma Open 's-Hertogenbosch, Netherlands; ATP 250; Grass, outdoor 12 – 18 June 2023
Libéma Open 's-Hertogenbosch, Netherlands; ATP 250; Grass, outdoor 12 – 18 June 2023	–	1R	Bye			
Libéma Open 's-Hertogenbosch, Netherlands; ATP 250; Grass, outdoor 12 – 18 June 2023	46 / 431	2R	(France) Adrian Mannarino	52	Loss	6–4, 4–6, 2–6
Halle Open; Halle, Germany; ATP 500; Grass, outdoor 19 – 25 June 2023
Halle Open; Halle, Germany; ATP 500; Grass, outdoor 19 – 25 June 2023	47 / 432	1R	(United States) Marcos Giron (Q)	57	Win	6–4, 6–3
Halle Open; Halle, Germany; ATP 500; Grass, outdoor 19 – 25 June 2023	48 / 433	2R	(Serbia) Laslo Djere	65	Win	6–3, 6–7^{(5–7)}, 6–3
Halle Open; Halle, Germany; ATP 500; Grass, outdoor 19 – 25 June 2023	49 / 434	QF	(Spain) Roberto Bautista Agut (8)	23	Loss	5–7, 6–7^{(3–7)}
Wimbledon; London, United Kingdom; Grand Slam tournament Grass, outdoor 3 – 16 July 2023
Wimbledon; London, United Kingdom; Grand Slam tournament Grass, outdoor 3 – 16 July 2023	50 / 435	1R	(United Kingdom) Arthur Fery (WC)	391	Win	7–5, 6–4, 6–3
Wimbledon; London, United Kingdom; Grand Slam tournament Grass, outdoor 3 – 16 July 2023	51 / 436	2R	(France) Adrian Mannarino	35	Win	6–3, 6–3, 7–6^{(7–5)}
Wimbledon; London, United Kingdom; Grand Slam tournament Grass, outdoor 3 – 16 July 2023	52 / 437	3R	(Hungary) Márton Fucsovics	67	Win	4–6, 6–3, 6–4, 6–4
Wimbledon; London, United Kingdom; Grand Slam tournament Grass, outdoor 3 – 16 July 2023	53 / 438	4R	(Czech Republic) Jiří Lehečka	37	Win	6–4, 6–2, 0–0 ret.
Wimbledon; London, United Kingdom; Grand Slam tournament Grass, outdoor 3 – 16 July 2023	54 / 439	QF	(United States) Christopher Eubanks	43	Win	6–4, 1–6, 4–6, 7–6^{(7–4)}, 6–1
Wimbledon; London, United Kingdom; Grand Slam tournament Grass, outdoor 3 – 16 July 2023	55 / 440	SF	(Spain) Carlos Alcaraz (1)	1	Loss	3–6, 3–6, 3–6
Canadian Open; Toronto, Canada; ATP 1000; Hard, outdoor 7 – 13 August 2023
Canadian Open; Toronto, Canada; ATP 1000; Hard, outdoor 7 – 13 August 2023	–	1R	Bye			
Canadian Open; Toronto, Canada; ATP 1000; Hard, outdoor 7 – 13 August 2023	56 / 441	2R	(Italy) Matteo Arnaldi (Q)	66	Win	6–2, 7–5
Canadian Open; Toronto, Canada; ATP 1000; Hard, outdoor 7 – 13 August 2023	57 / 442	3R	(Italy) Lorenzo Musetti (16)	19	Win	6–4, 6–4
Canadian Open; Toronto, Canada; ATP 1000; Hard, outdoor 7 – 13 August 2023	58 / 443	QF	(Australia) Alex de Minaur	18	Loss	6–7^{(7–9)}, 5–7
Cincinnati Masters; Cincinnati, United States; ATP 1000; Hard, outdoor 13 – 20 August 2023
Cincinnati Masters; Cincinnati, United States; ATP 1000; Hard, outdoor 13 – 20 August 2023	–	1R	Bye			
Cincinnati Masters; Cincinnati, United States; ATP 1000; Hard, outdoor 13 – 20 August 2023	59 / 444	2R	(Italy) Lorenzo Musetti	18	Win	6–4, 6–4
Cincinnati Masters; Cincinnati, United States; ATP 1000; Hard, outdoor 13 – 20 August 2023	60 / 445	3R	(Germany) Alexander Zverev (16)	17	Loss	4–6, 7–5, 4–6
US Open; New York City, United States; Grand Slam tournament Hard, outdoor 28 August – 10 September 2023
US Open; New York City, United States; Grand Slam tournament Hard, outdoor 28 August – 10 September 2023	61 / 446	1R	(Hungary) Attila Balázs (PR)	N/A	Win	6–1, 6–1, 6–0
US Open; New York City, United States; Grand Slam tournament Hard, outdoor 28 August – 10 September 2023	62 / 447	2R	(Australia) Christopher O'Connell	69	Win	6–2, 6–2, 6–7^{(6–8)}, 6–2
US Open; New York City, United States; Grand Slam tournament Hard, outdoor 28 August – 10 September 2023	63 / 448	3R	(Argentina) Sebastián Báez	32	Win	6–2, 6–2, 7–6^{(8–6)}
US Open; New York City, United States; Grand Slam tournament Hard, outdoor 28 August – 10 September 2023	64 / 449	4R	(Australia) Alex de Minaur (13)	13	Win	2–6, 6–4, 6–1, 6–2
US Open; New York City, United States; Grand Slam tournament Hard, outdoor 28 August – 10 September 2023	65 / 450	QF	Andrey Rublev (8)	8	Win	6–4, 6–3, 6–4
US Open; New York City, United States; Grand Slam tournament Hard, outdoor 28 August – 10 September 2023	66 / 451	SF	(Spain) Carlos Alcaraz (1)	1	Win	7–6^{(7–3)}, 6–1, 3–6, 6–3
US Open; New York City, United States; Grand Slam tournament Hard, outdoor 28 August – 10 September 2023	67 / 452	F	(Serbia) Novak Djokovic (2)	2	Loss	3–6, 6–7^{(5–7)}, 3–6
China Open; Beijing, China; ATP 500; Hard, outdoor 28 September – 4 October 2023
China Open; Beijing, China; ATP 500; Hard, outdoor 28 September – 4 October 2023	68 / 453	1R	(United States) Tommy Paul	13	Win	6–2, 6–1
China Open; Beijing, China; ATP 500; Hard, outdoor 28 September – 4 October 2023	69 / 454	2R	(Australia) Alex de Minaur	12	Win	7–6^{(7–3)}, 6–3
China Open; Beijing, China; ATP 500; Hard, outdoor 28 September – 4 October 2023	70 / 455	QF	(France) Ugo Humbert	36	Win	6–4, 3–6, 6–1
China Open; Beijing, China; ATP 500; Hard, outdoor 28 September – 4 October 2023	71 / 456	SF	(Germany) Alexander Zverev (8)	10	Win	6–4, 6–3
China Open; Beijing, China; ATP 500; Hard, outdoor 28 September – 4 October 2023	72 / 457	F	(Italy) Jannik Sinner (8)	7	Loss	6–7^{(2–7)}, 6–7^{(2–7)}
Shanghai Masters; Shanghai, China; ATP 1000; Hard, outdoor 4 – 15 October 2023
Shanghai Masters; Shanghai, China; ATP 1000; Hard, outdoor 4 – 15 October 2023	–	1R	Bye			
Shanghai Masters; Shanghai, China; ATP 1000; Hard, outdoor 4 – 15 October 2023	73 / 458	2R	(Chile) Cristian Garín	98	Win	6–3, 6–3
Shanghai Masters; Shanghai, China; ATP 1000; Hard, outdoor 4 – 15 October 2023	74 / 459	3R	(United States) Sebastian Korda (26)	26	Loss	6–7^{(8–10)}, 2–6
Vienna Open; Vienna, Austria; ATP 500; Hard, indoor 23 – 29 October 2023
Vienna Open; Vienna, Austria; ATP 500; Hard, indoor 23 – 29 October 2023	75 / 460	1R	(France) Arthur Fils	38	Win	6–4, 6–2
Vienna Open; Vienna, Austria; ATP 500; Hard, indoor 23 – 29 October 2023	76 / 461	2R	(Bulgaria) Grigor Dimitrov	17	Win	3–6, 6–2, 6–4
Vienna Open; Vienna, Austria; ATP 500; Hard, indoor 23 – 29 October 2023	77 / 462	QF	Karen Khachanov (8)	16	Win	6–3, 3–6, 6–3
Vienna Open; Vienna, Austria; ATP 500; Hard, indoor 23 – 29 October 2023	78 / 463	SF	(Greece) Stefanos Tsitsipas (4)	7	Win	6–4, 7–6^{(8–6)}
Vienna Open; Vienna, Austria; ATP 500; Hard, indoor 23 – 29 October 2023	79 / 464	F	(Italy) Jannik Sinner (2)	4	Loss	6–7^{(7–9)}, 6–4, 3–6
Paris Masters; Paris, France; ATP 1000; Hard, indoor 30 October – 5 November 2023
Paris Masters; Paris, France; ATP 1000; Hard, indoor 30 October – 5 November 2023	–	1R	Bye			
Paris Masters; Paris, France; ATP 1000; Hard, indoor 30 October – 5 November 2023	80 / 465	2R	(Bulgaria) Grigor Dimitrov	17	Loss	3–6, 7–6^{(7–4)}, 6–7^{(2–7)}
ATP Finals; Turin, Italy; ATP Finals; Hard, indoor 12 – 19 November 2023
ATP Finals; Turin, Italy; ATP Finals; Hard, indoor 12 – 19 November 2023	81 / 466	RR	Andrey Rublev (5)	5	Win	6–4, 6–2
ATP Finals; Turin, Italy; ATP Finals; Hard, indoor 12 – 19 November 2023	82 / 467	RR	(Germany) Alexander Zverev (7)	7	Win	7–6^{(9–7)}, 6–4
ATP Finals; Turin, Italy; ATP Finals; Hard, indoor 12 – 19 November 2023	83 / 468	RR	(Spain) Carlos Alcaraz (2)	2	Loss	4–6, 4–6
ATP Finals; Turin, Italy; ATP Finals; Hard, indoor 12 – 19 November 2023	84 / 469	SF	(Italy) Jannik Sinner (4)	4	Loss	3–6, 7–6^{(7–4)}, 1–6

=== Singles schedule ===
Date	Tournament	Location	Tier	Surface	Prev. result	Prev. points	New points	Result
–	ATP Cup	Sydney (AUS)	ATP Cup	Hard	SF	295	0	Event discontinued
1 January 2023– 8 January 2023	Adelaide International 1	Adelaide (AUS)	250 Series	Hard	N/A	0	90	Semifinals (lost to Novak Djokovic, 3–6, 4–6)
16 January 2023– 29 January 2023	Australian Open	Melbourne (AUS)	Grand Slam	Hard	F	1200	90	Third round (lost to Sebastian Korda, 6–7^{(7–9)}, 3–6, 6–7^{(4–7)})
13 February 2023– 19 February 2023	Rotterdam Open	Rotterdam (NED)	500 Series	Hard (i)	N/A	0	500	Champion (defeated Jannik Sinner, 5–7, 6–2, 6–2)
20 February 2023– 25 February 2023	Qatar Open	Doha (QAT)	250 Series	Hard	N/A	0	250	Champion (defeated Andy Murray, 6–4, 6–4)
27 February 2023– 4 March 2023	Dubai Tennis Championships	Dubai (UAE)	500 Series	Hard	N/A	0	500	Champion (defeated Andrey Rublev, 6–2, 6–2)
27 February 2023– 4 March 2023	Mexican Open	Acapulco (MEX)	500 Series	Hard	SF	180	0	Withdrew
8 March 2023– 19 March 2023	Indian Wells Masters	Indian Wells (USA)	Masters 1000	Hard	3R	45	600	Final (lost to Carlos Alcaraz, 3–6, 2–6)
22 March 2023– 2 April 2023	Miami Open	Miami (USA)	Masters 1000	Hard	QF	180	1000	Champion (defeated Jannik Sinner, 7–5, 6–3)
9 April 2023– 16 April 2023	Monte-Carlo Masters	Roquebrune-Cap-Martin (FRA)	Masters 1000	Clay	N/A	0	180	Quarterfinals (lost to Holger Rune, 3–6, 4–6)
17 April 2023– 23 April 2023	Barcelona Open	Barcelona (ESP)	500 Series	Clay	N/A	0	0	Withdrew
26 April 2023– 7 May 2023	Madrid Open	Madrid (ESP)	Masters 1000	Clay	N/A	0	90	Fourth round (lost to Aslan Karatsev, 6–7^{(1–6)}, 4–6)
10 May 2023– 21 May 2023	Italian Open	Rome (ITA)	Masters 1000	Clay	N/A	0	1000	Champion (defeated Holger Rune, 7–5, 7–5)
28 May 2023– 11 June 2023	French Open	Paris (FRA)	Grand Slam	Clay	4R	180	10	First round (lost to Thiago Seyboth Wild, 6–7^{(5–7)}, 7–6^{(8–6)}, 6–2, 3–6, 4–6)
12 June 2023– 18 June 2023	Libéma Open	's-Hertogenbosch (NED)	250 series	Grass	F	150	0	Second round (lost to Adrian Mannarino, 6–4, 4–6, 2–6)
19 June 2023– 25 June 2023	Halle Open	Halle (GER)	500 Series	Grass	F	300	90	Quarterfinals (lost to Roberto Bautista Agut, 5–7, 6–7^{(3–7)})
25 June 2023– 1 July 2023	Mallorca Championships	Mallorca (ESP)	250 series	Grass	QF	45	0	Withdrew
3 July 2023– 16 July 2023	Wimbledon	London (GBR)	Grand Slam	Grass	N/A	0 (Note: Removal Of ATP Rankings Points From 2022 Wimbledon.)	720	Semifinals (lost to Carlos Alcaraz, 3–6, 3–6, 3–6)
31 July 2023– 5 August 2023	Los Cabos Open	Mexico (MEX)	250 series	Hard	W	250	0	Withdrew
7 August 2023– 13 August 2023	Canadian Open	Toronto (CAN)	Masters 1000	Hard	2R	10	180	Quarterfinals (lost to Alex de Minaur, 6–7^{(7–9)}, 5–7)
13 August 2022– 20 August 2023	Cincinnati Masters	Cincinnati (USA)	Masters 1000	Hard	SF	360	90	Third round (lost to Alexander Zverev, 4–6, 7–5, 4–6)
28 August 2023– 10 September 2023	US Open	New York (USA)	Grand Slam	Hard	4R	180	1200	Final (lost to Novak Djokovic, 3–6, 6–7^{(5–7)}, 3–6)
27 September 2023– 3 October 2023	Astana Open	Astana (KAZ)	500 series	Hard (i)	SF	180	0	Withdrew
28 September 2023– 4 October 2023	China Open	Beijing (CHN)	500 Series	Hard	N/A	0	300	Final (lost to Jannik Sinner, 6–7^{(2–7)}, 6–7^{(2–7)})
4 October 2023– 15 October 2023	Shanghai Masters	Shanghai (CHN)	Masters 1000	Hard	N/A	0	45	Third round (lost to Sebastian Korda, 6–7^{(8–10)}, 2–6)
23 October 2023– 29 October 2023	Vienna Open	Vienna (AUT)	500 Series	Hard (i)	W	500	300	Final (lost to Jannik Sinner, 6–7^{(7–9)}, 6–4, 3–6)
30 October 2023– 5 November 2023	Paris Masters	Paris (FRA)	Masters 1000	Hard (i)	2R	10	10	Third round (lost to Grigor Dimitrov, 3–6, 7–6^{(7–4)}, 6–7^{(2–7)})
5 November 2023– 11 November 2023	Moselle Open	Metz (FRA)	250 series	Hard (i)	2R	0	0	Withdrew
12 November 2023– 19 November 2023	ATP Finals	Turin (ITA)	Tour Finals	Hard (i)	RR	0	400	Semifinals (lost to Jannik Sinner, 3–6, 7–6^{(7–4)}, 1–6)
Total year-end points						4065	7600	▲3535 difference

== Yearly records ==
=== Head-to-head matchups ===
Daniil Medvedev has a 66–18 ATP match win–loss record in the 2023 season. His record against players who were part of the ATP rankings Top Ten at the time of their meetings is 12–9. Bold indicates player was ranked top 10 at the time of at least one meeting. The following list is ordered by number of wins:

- (Germany) Alexander Zverev 5–1
- Karen Khachanov 3–0
- **Andrey Rublev** 3–0
- **(Canada) Félix Auger-Aliassime** 2–0
- (Italy) Matteo Arnaldi 2–0
- (United States) Christopher Eubanks 2–0
- (Spain) Alejandro Davidovich Fokina 2–0
- (United States) Marcos Giron 2–0
- (Italy) Lorenzo Musetti 2–0
- (Australia) Christopher O'Connell 2–0
- (Italy) Lorenzo Sonego 2–0
- **(Greece) Stefanos Tsitsipas** 2–0
- (Australia) Alex de Minaur 2–1
- (Bulgaria) Grigor Dimitrov 2–1
- **(Italy) Jannik Sinner** 2–3
- (Spain) Roberto Carballés Baena 1–0
- (Argentina) Sebastián Báez 1–0
- (Hungary) Attila Balázs 1–0
- (United Kingdom) Liam Broady 1–0
- (Kazakhstan) Alexander Bublik 1–0
- (Croatia) Borna Ćorić 1–0
- (Serbia) Laslo Djere 1–0
- (United Kingdom) Arthur Fery 1–0
- (France) Arthur Fils 1–0
- (Hungary) Márton Fucsovics 1–0
- (Chile) Cristian Garín 1–0
- (France) Quentin Halys 1–0
- (Germany) Yannick Hanfmann 1–0
- (France) Ugo Humbert 1–0
- Ilya Ivashka 1–0
- (Serbia) Miomir Kecmanović 1–0
- (Czech Republic) Jiří Lehečka 1–0
- (Australia) John Millman 1–0
- (Spain) Bernabé Zapata Miralles 1–0
- (United Kingdom) Andy Murray 1–0
- (United States) Brandon Nakashima 1–0
- (United States) Tommy Paul 1–0
- (Finland) Emil Ruusuvuori 1–0
- Alexander Shevchenko 1–0
- (United States) Frances Tiafoe 1–0
- (Netherlands) Botic van de Zandschulp 1–0
- (Italy) Andrea Vavassori 1–0
- (France) Adrian Mannarino 1–1
- **(Denmark) Holger Rune** 1–1
- **(Serbia) Novak Djokovic** 1–2
- **(Spain) Carlos Alcaraz** 1–3
- (Spain) Roberto Bautista Agut 0–1
- Aslan Karatsev 0–1
- (Brazil) Thiago Seyboth Wild 0–1
- (United States) Sebastian Korda 0–2

* Statistics correct as of 17 November 2023.

=== Top 10 wins (12–9) ===
Category Grand Slam (2–1) ATP Finals (2–2) Masters 1000 (2–3) 500 Series (5–2) 250 Series (1–1)	Wins by surface Hard (10–7) Clay (2–1) Grass (0–1)	Wins by setting Outdoor (8–6) Indoor (4–3)

#	Player	Rank	Event	Surface	Rd	Score	DMR
1/30	(Canada) Félix Auger-Aliassime	8	Rotterdam Open, Netherlands	Hard (i)	QF	6–2, 6–4	11
2/31	(Canada) Félix Auger-Aliassime	9	Qatar Open, Qatar	Hard	SF	6–4, 7–6^{(9–7)}	8
3/32	(Serbia) Novak Djokovic	**1**	Dubai Championships, UAE	Hard	SF	6–4, 6–4	4
4/33	Andrey Rublev	6	Dubai Championships, UAE	Hard	F	6–2, 6–2	4
5/34	(Greece) Stefanos Tsitsipas	5	Italian Open, Italy	Clay	SF	7–5, 7–5	3
6/35	(Denmark) Holger Rune	7	Italian Open, Italy	Clay	F	7–5, 7–5	3
7/36	Andrey Rublev	8	US Open, United States	Hard	QF	6–4, 6–3, 6–4	3
8/37	(Spain) Carlos Alcaraz	**1**	US Open, United States	Hard	SF	7–6^{(7–3)}, 6–1, 3–6, 6–3	3
9/38	(Germany) Alexander Zverev	10	China Open, China	Hard	SF	6–4, 6–3	3
10/39	(Greece) Stefanos Tsitsipas	7	Vienna Open, Austria	Hard (i)	SF	6–4, 7–6^{(8–6)}	3
11/40	Andrey Rublev	5	ATP Finals, Italy	Hard (i)	RR	6–4, 6–2	3
12/41	(Germany) Alexander Zverev	7	ATP Finals, Italy	Hard (i)	RR	7–6^{(9–7)}, 6–4	3

=== Finals ===
==== Singles: 9 (5 titles, 4 runner-ups) ====
Category Grand Slam (0–1) ATP Finals (0–0) Masters 1000 (2–1) 500 Series (2–1) 250 Series (1–0)	Titles by surface Hard (4–3) Clay (1–0) Grass (0–0)	Titles by setting Outdoor (4–3) Indoor (1–0)

Result	W–L	Date	Tournament	Tier	Surface	Opponent	Score
Win	1–0	Feb 2023	Rotterdam Open, Netherlands	500 Series	Hard (i)	(Italy) Jannik Sinner	5–7, 6–2, 6–2
Win	2–0	Feb 2023	Qatar Open, Qatar	250 Series	Hard	(United Kingdom) Andy Murray	6–4, 6–4
Win	3–0	Feb 2023	Dubai Tennis Championships, Dubai	500 Series	Hard	(Russia) Andrey Rublev	6–2, 6–2
Loss	3–1	Mar 2023	Indian Wells Masters, United States	Masters 1000	Hard	(Spain) Carlos Alcaraz	3–6, 2–6
Win	4–1	Mar 2023	Miami Open, USA	Masters 1000	Hard	(Italy) Jannik Sinner	7–5, 6–3
Win	5–1	May 2023	Italian Open, Italy	Masters 1000	Clay	(Denmark) Holger Rune	7–5, 7–5
Loss	5–2	Sep 2023	US Open, United States	Grand Slam	Hard	(Serbia) Novak Djokovic	3–6, 6–7^{(5–7)}, 3–6
Loss	5–3	Oct 2023	China Open, China	500 Series	Hard	(Italy) Jannik Sinner	6–7^{(2–7)}, 6–7^{(2–7)}
Loss	5–4	Oct 2023	Vienna Open, Austria	500 Series	Hard (i)	(Italy) Jannik Sinner	6–7^{(7–9)}, 6–4, 3–6

=== Earnings ===
- **Bold** font denotes tournament win

**Singles**
Event	Prize money	Year-to-date
Adelaide International	$32,150	$32,150
Australian Open	A$227,925	$191,127
**Rotterdam Open**	**€387,940**	$605,292
**Qatar Open**	**$209,445**	$814,737
**Dubai Tennis Championships**	**$533,990**	$1,348,727
Indian Wells Masters	$662,360	$2,011,087
**Miami Open**	**$1,262,220**	$3,273,307
Monte-Carlo Masters	€145,380	$3,431,728
Madrid Open	€84,900	$3,525,024
**Italian Open**	**€1,105,265**	$4,742,805
French Open	€69,000	$4,816,801
Libéma Open	€11,825	$4,829,510
Halle Open	€60,145	$4,895,309
Wimbledon Championships	£600,000	$5,657,009
Canadian Open	$166,020	$5,823,029
Cincinnati Masters	$88,805	$5,911,834
US Open	$1,500,000	$7,411,834
China Open	$365,640	$7,777,474
Shanghai Masters	$55,770	$7,833,244
Vienna Open	€242,480	$8,090,126
Paris Masters	€41,700	$8,134,179
ATP Finals	$1,105,500	$9,239,679
Bonus pool	$2,308,344	$11,548,023
		$11,548,023
**Doubles**
Event	Prize money	Year-to-date
		$0
**Total**
		**$11,548,023**

Figures in United States dollars (USD) unless noted.

- source：2023 Singles Activity
- source：2023 Doubles Activity

== See also ==
- 2023 ATP Tour
- 2023 Novak Djokovic tennis season
- 2023 Carlos Alcaraz tennis season
