= 2023 Halle Open – Singles =

Singles
- 2023 Halle Open

Final
- Champion: (Kazakhstan) Alexander Bublik
- Runner-up: Andrey Rublev
- Score: 6–3, 3–6, 6–3

Details
- Draw: 32 (4 Q / 3 WC )
- Seeds: 8

Events
Singles	Doubles
← 2022 ·	Halle Open	· 2024 →

Alexander Bublik defeated Andrey Rublev in the final, 6–3, 3–6, 6–3 to win the singles tennis title at the 2023 Halle Open.

Hubert Hurkacz was the defending champion, but lost in the second round to Tallon Griekspoor.

== Seeds ==
1. Daniil Medvedev (quarterfinals)
2. (Greece) Stefanos Tsitsipas (second round)
3. Andrey Rublev (final)
4. (Italy) Jannik Sinner (quarterfinals, retired)
5. (Canada) Félix Auger-Aliassime (withdrew)
6. (Poland) Hubert Hurkacz (second round)
7. (Croatia) Borna Ćorić (first round)
8. (Spain) Roberto Bautista Agut (semifinals)
9. (Germany) Alexander Zverev (semifinals)

== Draw ==
Key

- Q = Qualifier
- WC = Wild card
- LL = Lucky loser
- Alt = Alternate
- ITF = ITF entry
- PR = Protected ranking
- SR = Special ranking
- SE = Special exempt
- JE = Junior exempt
- JR = Junior Accelerator Programme entrant
- CO = College Accelerator Programme entrant
- NG = Next Gen Accelerator Program entrant
- w/o = Walkover
- r = Retired
- d = Defaulted

=== Finals ===
Semifinals
8	(Spain) Roberto Bautista Agut	3	4
3	Andrey Rublev	6	6
(Kazakhstan) Alexander Bublik	6	7
9	(Germany) Alexander Zverev	3	5

Final
3	Andrey Rublev	3	6	3
(Kazakhstan) Alexander Bublik	6	3	6

=== Top half ===
First round
1	D Medvedev	6	6
Q	(United States) M Giron	4	3
WC	(Germany) O Otte	6^{3}	3
(Serbia) L Djere	7^{7}	6
(Sweden) M Ymer	6	4	5
(United States) B Nakashima	4	6	7
LL	(Italy) A Vavassori	3	4
8	(Spain) R Bautista Agut	6	6
3	A Rublev	6	6^{5}	6
(China) Y Wu	4	7^{7}	2
Q	(Germany) L Wessels	4	6	3
WC	(Germany) Y Hanfmann	6	3	6
(Netherlands) T Griekspoor	6	7
(Spain) R Carballés Baena	2	5
Q	(United States) C Eubanks	4	7^{13}	3
6	(Poland) H Hurkacz	6	6^{11}	6

Second round
1	D Medvedev	6	6^{5}	6
(Serbia) L Djere	3	7^{7}	3
(United States) B Nakashima	5	6^{2}
8	(Spain) R Bautista Agut	7	7^{7}
3	A Rublev	7^{8}	6
WC	(Germany) Y Hanfmann	6^{6}	3
(Netherlands) T Griekspoor	6	1	7^{10}
6	(Poland) H Hurkacz	3	6	6^{8}

Quarterfinals
1	D Medvedev	5	6^{3}
8	(Spain) R Bautista Agut	7	7^{7}
3	A Rublev	3	6	6
(Netherlands) T Griekspoor	6	3	4

Semifinals
8	(Spain) R Bautista Agut	3	4
3	A Rublev	6	6

=== Bottom half ===
First round
7	(Croatia) B Ćorić	3	1
(Kazakhstan) A Bublik	6	6
Q	R Safiullin	1	6^{4}
(Germany) J-L Struff	6	7^{7}
(Italy) L Sonego	6	3	6
LL	A Karatsev	2	6	2
(France) R Gasquet	3	7	2
4	(Italy) J Sinner	6	5	6
9	(Germany) A Zverev	6	6
WC	(Austria) D Thiem	3	4
(Canada) D Shapovalov	7^{7}	6
PR	(South Africa) L Harris	6^{1}	4
(Chile) N Jarry	6	7
(France) C Moutet	3	5
(France) G Barrère	7^{8}	4	6^{3}
2/WC	(Greece) S Tsitsipas	6^{6}	6	7^{7}

Second round
(Kazakhstan) A Bublik	6	6^{4}	6
(Germany) J-L Struff	3	7^{7}	3
(Italy) L Sonego	7^{7}	4	4
4	(Italy) J Sinner	6^{4}	6	6
9	(Germany) A Zverev	6	6
(Canada) D Shapovalov	2	4
(Chile) N Jarry	7^{9}	7
2/WC	(Greece) S Tsitsipas	6^{7}	5

Quarterfinals
(Kazakhstan) A Bublik	7	2
4	(Italy) J Sinner	5	0^{r}
9	(Germany) A Zverev	7	6
(Chile) N Jarry	5	3

Semifinals
(Kazakhstan) A Bublik	6	7
9	(Germany) A Zverev	3	5

== Qualifying ==
=== Seeds ===
1. Aslan Karatsev (qualifying competition, lucky loser)
2. (China) Zhang Zhizhen (first round)
3. (United States) Marcos Giron (qualified)
4. (Germany) Daniel Altmaier (qualifying competition, retired)
5. (Australia) Max Purcell (withdrew)
6. (France) Luca Van Assche (first round)
7. (United States) Christopher Eubanks (qualified)
8. (France) Benjamin Bonzi (first round)

=== Qualifiers ===
1. Roman Safiullin
2. (Germany) Louis Wessels
3. (United States) Marcos Giron
4. (United States) Christopher Eubanks

=== Lucky losers ===
1. (Italy) Andrea Vavassori
2. Aslan Karatsev

=== Qualifying draw ===
==== First qualifier ====
First round
1	Aslan Karatsev	4	6	7
WC	(Germany) Maximilian Marterer	6	3	5
Roman Safiullin	6	7
8	(France) Benjamin Bonzi	0	5

Qualifying competition
1	Aslan Karatsev	6^{4}	3
Roman Safiullin	7^{7}	6

==== Second qualifier ====
First round
2	(China) Zhang Zhizhen	4	2
WC	(Germany) Louis Wessels	6	6
WC	(Germany) Henri Squire	6	6
6	(France) Luca Van Assche	2	2

Qualifying competition
WC	(Germany) Louis Wessels	6	3	6
WC	(Germany) Henri Squire	3	6	3

==== Third qualifier ====
First round
3	(United States) Marcos Giron	6	6
Alt	Pavel Kotov	4	4
(Moldova) Radu Albot	4	4
Alt	(Italy) Andrea Vavassori	6	6

Qualifying competition
3	(United States) Marcos Giron	7^{7}	1	6
Alt	(Italy) Andrea Vavassori	6^{2}	6	1

==== Fourth qualifier ====
First round
4	(Germany) Daniel Altmaier	7^{7}	6
(Croatia) Borna Gojo	6^{5}	3
(France) Hugo Gaston	7^{7}	6^{5}	3
7	(United States) Christopher Eubanks	6^{4}	7^{7}	6

Qualifying competition
4	(Germany) Daniel Altmaier	3	3^{r}
7	(United States) Christopher Eubanks	6	2
