= 2023 Dubai Tennis Championships – Women's doubles =

Women's doubles
- 2023 Dubai Tennis Championships

Final
- Champions: Veronika Kudermetova; Liudmila Samsonova
- Runners-up: (Chinese Taipei) Chan Hao-ching (Chinese Taipei) Latisha Chan
- Score: 6–4, 6–7^{(4–7)}, [10–1]

Details
- Draw: 28 (3 WC)
- Seeds: 8

Events
Singles	men	women
Doubles	men	women
- Dubai Tennis Championships

Defending champion Veronika Kudermetova and her partner Liudmila Samsonova defeated Chan Hao-ching and Latisha Chan in the final, 6–4, 6–7^{(4–7)}, [10–1] to win the women's doubles tennis title at the 2023 Dubai Tennis Championships.

Kudermetova and Elise Mertens were the reigning champions, but Mertens chose not to compete this year.

This tournament marked the last professional appearance of former doubles world No. 1 Sania Mirza. Mirza partnered Madison Keys, but lost in the first round to Kudermetova and Samsonova.

== Seeds ==
The top four seeds received a bye into the second round.

1. (United States) Coco Gauff / (United States) Jessica Pegula (quarterfinals)
2. (Ukraine) Lyudmyla Kichenok / (Latvia) Jeļena Ostapenko (semifinals)
3. (United States) Desirae Krawczyk / (Netherlands) Demi Schuurs (semifinals)
4. (Mexico) Giuliana Olmos / (China) Zhang Shuai (second round)
5. (United States) Nicole Melichar-Martinez / (Australia) Ellen Perez (first round)
6. (Kazakhstan) Anna Danilina / (Brazil) Luisa Stefani (first round)
7. (China) Yang Zhaoxuan / Vera Zvonareva (quarterfinals)
8. (Belgium) Kirsten Flipkens / (Germany) Laura Siegemund (first round)

== Draw ==
Key

- Q = Qualifier
- WC = Wild card
- LL = Lucky loser
- Alt = Alternate
- ITF = ITF entry
- PR = Protected ranking
- SR = Special ranking
- SE = Special exempt
- JE = Junior exempt
- JR = Junior Accelerator Programme entrant
- CO = College Accelerator Programme entrant
- NG = Next Gen Accelerator Program entrant
- w/o = Walkover
- r = Retired
- d = Defaulted

=== Finals ===
Semifinals
(Chinese Taipei) Chan Hao-ching (Chinese Taipei) Latisha Chan	6	4	[10]
3	(United States) Desirae Krawczyk (Netherlands) Demi Schuurs	1	6	[4]
Veronika Kudermetova; Liudmila Samsonova	7	6
2	(Ukraine) Lyudmyla Kichenok (Latvia) Jeļena Ostapenko	5	2

Final
(Chinese Taipei) Chan Hao-ching (Chinese Taipei) Latisha Chan	4	7^{7}	[1]
Veronika Kudermetova; Liudmila Samsonova	6	6^{4}	[10]

=== Top half ===
First round
WC	(Romania) A Bogdan; A Gabueva	6^{3}	3
(Japan) M Kato (Indonesia) A Sutjiadi	7^{7}	6
(Georgia (country)) O Kalashnikova; A Panova	1	6^{10}
(Chinese Taipei) H-c Chan (Chinese Taipei) L Chan	6	7^{12}
A Kalinskaya (Czech Republic) M Vondroušová	3	6	[16]
5	(United States) N Melichar-Martinez (Australia) E Perez	6	3	[14]
(Norway) U Eikeri (Poland) A Rosolska	6	7^{7}
(Chile) A Guarachi (New Zealand) E Routliffe	2	6^{3}
Alt	(Czech Republic) L Fruhvirtová (Estonia) K Kanepi	6	4	[9]
(Romania) M Niculescu (Belgium) K Zimmermann	3	6	[11]
A Pavlyuchenkova (Kazakhstan) E Rybakina	6	6
8	(Belgium) K Flipkens (Germany) L Siegemund	2	4

Second round
1	(United States) C Gauff (United States) J Pegula	4	7^{7}	[10]
(Japan) M Kato (Indonesia) A Sutjiadi	6	6^{5}	[2]
(Chinese Taipei) H-c Chan (Chinese Taipei) L Chan	7^{7}	7^{9}
A Kalinskaya (Czech Republic) M Vondroušová	6^{5}	6^{7}
3	(United States) D Krawczyk (Netherlands) D Schuurs	6	6
(Norway) U Eikeri (Poland) A Rosolska	1	2
(Romania) M Niculescu (Belgium) K Zimmermann	w/o
A Pavlyuchenkova (Kazakhstan) E Rybakina

Quarterfinals
1	(United States) C Gauff (United States) J Pegula	1	3
(Chinese Taipei) H-c Chan (Chinese Taipei) L Chan	6	6
3	(United States) D Krawczyk (Netherlands) D Schuurs	6	6
(Romania) M Niculescu (Belgium) K Zimmermann	0	4

Semifinals
(Chinese Taipei) H-c Chan (Chinese Taipei) L Chan	6	4	[10]
3	(United States) D Krawczyk (Netherlands) D Schuurs	1	6	[4]

=== Bottom half ===
First round
6	(Kazakhstan) A Danilina (Brazil) L Stefani	6	3	[9]
PR	(Canada) L Fernandez (United States) B Mattek-Sands	1	6	[11]
A Sasnovich (China) Y Xu	4	6	[10]
WC	(United Kingdom) H Dart (United Kingdom) E Silva	6	1	[6]
V Kudermetova; L Samsonova	6	6
(United States) M Keys (India) S Mirza	4	0
7	(China) Z Yang; V Zvonareva	6	6
(Czech Republic) M Bouzková (Brazil) B Haddad Maia	1	1
(Japan) S Aoyama (Japan) M Ninomiya	6	2	[10]
WC	(United States) S Kenin; E Yashina	1	6	[5]
(Hungary) T Babos (France) K Mladenovic	6	7^{8}
E Alexandrova (Slovakia) T Mihalíková	3	6^{6}

Second round
PR	(Canada) L Fernandez (United States) B Mattek-Sands	3	6	[13]
A Sasnovich (China) Y Xu	6	1	[11]
V Kudermetova; L Samsonova	6	6
4	(Mexico) G Olmos (China) S Zhang	4	2
7	(China) Z Yang; V Zvonareva	2	6	[16]
(Japan) S Aoyama (Japan) M Ninomiya	6	2	[14]
(Hungary) T Babos (France) K Mladenovic	1	6^{4}
2	(Ukraine) L Kichenok (Latvia) J Ostapenko	6	7^{7}

Quarterfinals
PR	(Canada) L Fernandez (United States) B Mattek-Sands	5	5
V Kudermetova; L Samsonova	7	7
7	(China) Z Yang; V Zvonareva	7^{7}	2	[8]
2	(Ukraine) L Kichenok (Latvia) J Ostapenko	6^{3}	6	[10]

Semifinals
V Kudermetova; L Samsonova	7	6
2	(Ukraine) L Kichenok (Latvia) J Ostapenko	5	2
