= 2023 Halle Open – Doubles =

Doubles
- 2023 Halle Open

Final
- Champions: (Brazil) Marcelo Melo (Australia) John Peers
- Runners-up: (Italy) Simone Bolelli (Italy) Andrea Vavassori
- Score: 7–6^{(7–3)}, 3–6, [10–6]

Details
- Draw: 16
- Seeds: 4

Events
Singles	Doubles
← 2022 ·	Halle Open	· 2024 →

Marcelo Melo and John Peers defeated Simone Bolelli and Andrea Vavassori in the final, 7–6^{(7–3)}, 3–6, [10–6] to win the doubles tennis title at the 2023 Halle Open.

Marcel Granollers and Horacio Zeballos were the defending champions, but lost in the first round to Albano Olivetti and David Vega Hernández.

== Seeds ==
1. (El Salvador) Marcelo Arévalo / (Netherlands) Jean-Julien Rojer (quarterfinals)
2. (Spain) Marcel Granollers / (Argentina) Horacio Zeballos (first round)
3. (Belgium) Sander Gillé / (Belgium) Joran Vliegen (first round)
4. (Germany) Kevin Krawietz / (Germany) Tim Pütz (first round)

== Draw ==
Key

- Q = Qualifier
- WC = Wild card
- LL = Lucky loser
- Alt = Alternate
- ITF = ITF entry
- PR = Protected ranking
- SR = Special ranking
- SE = Special exempt
- JE = Junior exempt
- JR = Junior Accelerator Programme entrant
- CO = College Accelerator Programme entrant
- NG = Next Gen Accelerator Program entrant
- w/o = Walkover
- r = Retired
- d = Defaulted

=== Draw ===
First round
1	(El Salvador) M Arévalo (Netherlands) J-J Rojer	6	6
(Netherlands) T Griekspoor (Netherlands) R Haase	4	4
(Poland) H Hurkacz (Italy) J Sinner	7^{7}	2	[7]
WC	(Germany) O Otte (Germany) J-L Struff	6^{5}	6	[10]
3	(Belgium) S Gillé (Belgium) J Vliegen	7^{7}	3	[6]
(Brazil) M Melo (Australia) J Peers	6^{3}	6	[10]
(Chile) N Jarry (Brazil) R Matos	3	6	[13]
(Austria) A Erler (Austria) L Miedler	6	3	[11]
A Rublev (Germany) A Zverev	3	4
(United States) N Lammons (United States) J Withrow	6	6
WC	(Brazil) M Demoliner (Germany) A Mies	6	7
4	(Germany) K Krawietz (Germany) T Pütz	4	5
(Kazakhstan) A Bublik (Croatia) B Ćorić	1	6	[9]
(Italy) S Bolelli (Italy) A Vavassori	6	2	[11]
Q	(France) A Olivetti (Spain) D Vega Hernández	4	7^{7}	[10]
2	(Spain) M Granollers (Argentina) H Zeballos	6	6^{5}	[8]

Quarterfinals
1	(El Salvador) M Arévalo (Netherlands) J-J Rojer	4	7	[7]
WC	(Germany) O Otte (Germany) J-L Struff	6	5	[10]
(Brazil) M Melo (Australia) J Peers	2	6	[10]
(Chile) N Jarry (Brazil) R Matos	6	3	[5]
(United States) N Lammons (United States) J Withrow	6	4	[6]
WC	(Brazil) M Demoliner (Germany) A Mies	3	6	[10]
(Italy) S Bolelli (Italy) A Vavassori	6	6
Q	(France) A Olivetti (Spain) D Vega Hernández	4	4

Semifinals
WC	(Germany) O Otte (Germany) J-L Struff	6^{5}	6^{4}
(Brazil) M Melo (Australia) J Peers	7^{7}	7^{7}
WC	(Brazil) M Demoliner (Germany) A Mies	3	7^{7}	[7]
(Italy) S Bolelli (Italy) A Vavassori	6	6^{0}	[10]

Final
(Brazil) M Melo (Australia) J Peers	7^{7}	3	[10]
(Italy) S Bolelli (Italy) A Vavassori	6^{3}	6	[6]

== Qualifying ==
=== Seeds ===
1. (France) Sadio Doumbia / (France) Fabien Reboul (qualifying competition)
2. (France) Albano Olivetti / (Spain) David Vega Hernández (qualified)

=== Qualifiers ===
1. (France) Albano Olivetti / (Spain) David Vega Hernández

=== Qualifying draw ===
First round
1	(France) Sadio Doumbia (France) Fabien Reboul	6	6
(France) Grégoire Barrère (France) Luca Van Assche	3	2
WC	(Germany) Henri Squire (Germany) Louis Wessels	6	3	[8]
2	(France) Albano Olivetti (Spain) David Vega Hernández	4	6	[10]

Qualifying competition
1	(France) Sadio Doumbia (France) Fabien Reboul	5	6^{5}
2	(France) Albano Olivetti (Spain) David Vega Hernández	7	7^{7}
