= 2023 Dubai Tennis Championships – Women's singles =

Women's singles
- 2023 Dubai Tennis Championships

Final
- Champion: (Czech Republic) Barbora Krejčíková
- Runner-up: (Poland) Iga Świątek
- Score: 6–4, 6–2

Details
- Draw: 56 (8Q / 5WC)
- Seeds: 16

Events
Singles	men	women
Doubles	men	women
- Dubai Tennis Championships

Barbora Krejčíková defeated Iga Świątek in the final, 6–4, 6–2 to win the women's singles tennis title at the 2023 Dubai Tennis Championships. It was her first WTA 1000 title.

In addition to world No. 1 Świątek, Krejčíková also defeated No. 2 Aryna Sabalenka and No. 3 Jessica Pegula, becoming the fifth woman to defeat the top three ranked players in a single tournament, the third to do so outside of the WTA Finals and the first to be ranked (No. 30) outside of the top ten. Krejčíková also saved four match points en route to the title, in the second round against Daria Kasatkina.

Jeļena Ostapenko was the defending champion, but lost in the third round to Sabalenka.

== Seeds ==
The top eight seeds received a bye into the second round.

1. (Poland) Iga Świątek (final)
2. Aryna Sabalenka (quarterfinals)
3. (United States) Jessica Pegula (semifinals)
4. (France) Caroline Garcia (second round)
5. (United States) Coco Gauff (semifinals)
6. (Greece) Maria Sakkari (second round)
7. Daria Kasatkina (second round)
8. (Switzerland) Belinda Bencic (third round)

9. (Kazakhstan) Elena Rybakina (third round, withdrew)
10. Veronika Kudermetova (first round)
11. (Brazil) Beatriz Haddad Maia (first round)
12. (Czech Republic) Petra Kvitová (third round)
13. (Latvia) Jeļena Ostapenko (third round)
14. Liudmila Samsonova (third round)
15. Victoria Azarenka (third round)
16. Ekaterina Alexandrova (withdrew)

Click on the seed number of a player to go to their draw section.

== Draw ==
Key

- Q = Qualifier
- WC = Wild card
- LL = Lucky loser
- Alt = Alternate
- ITF = ITF entry
- PR = Protected ranking
- SR = Special ranking
- SE = Special exempt
- JE = Junior exempt
- JR = Junior Accelerator Programme entrant
- CO = College Accelerator Programme entrant
- NG = Next Gen Accelerator Program entrant
- w/o = Walkover
- r = Retired
- d = Defaulted

=== Finals ===
Quarterfinals
1	(Poland) Iga Świątek	w/o
(Czech Republic) Karolína Plíšková
(United States) Madison Keys	2	5
5	(United States) Coco Gauff	6	7
PR	(Czech Republic) Karolína Muchová
3	(United States) Jessica Pegula	w/o
(Czech Republic) Barbora Krejčíková	0	7^{7}	6
2	Aryna Sabalenka	6	6^{2}	1

Semifinals
1	(Poland) Iga Świątek	6	6
5	(United States) Coco Gauff	4	2
3	(United States) Jessica Pegula	1	7	0
(Czech Republic) Barbora Krejčíková	6	5	6

Final
1	(Poland) Iga Świątek	4	2
(Czech Republic) Barbora Krejčíková	6	6

=== Top half ===
==== Section 1 ====
First round
Q	(Austria) J Grabher	4	2
(Canada) L Fernandez	6	6
(China) Q Zheng	6	6
(China) S Zhang	3	1
(Spain) P Badosa	7^{7}	6^{5}	4
14	L Samsonova	6^{3}	7^{7}	6
10	V Kudermetova	3	7	5
(Ukraine) A Kalinina	6	5	7
Q	(Ukraine) D Yastremska	6	6
(France) A Cornet	2	3
(Czech Republic) Ka Plíšková	6	6
PR	(Czech Republic) M Vondroušová	3	4

Second round
1	(Poland) I Świątek	6	6
(Canada) L Fernandez	1	1
(China) Q Zheng
14	L Samsonova	w/o
(Ukraine) A Kalinina	5	6	6
Q	(Ukraine) D Yastremska	7	2	3
(Czech Republic) Ka Plíšková	6	6
6	(Greece) M Sakkari	1	2

Third round
1	(Poland) I Świątek	6	6
14	L Samsonova	1	0
(Ukraine) A Kalinina	5	7^{8}	2
(Czech Republic) Ka Plíšková	7	6^{6}	6

Quarterfinals
1	(Poland) I Świątek	w/o
(Czech Republic) Ka Plíšková

==== Section 2 ====
First round
Q	(Italy) J Paolini	1	1
(United States) M Keys	6	6
(United States) A Anisimova	6	6
WC	V Zvonareva	3	2
PR	A Pavlyuchenkova	3	5
15	V Azarenka	6	7
9	(Kazakhstan) E Rybakina	6	6
(Canada) B Andreescu	3	4
WC	(United States) S Kenin	1	1
(Czech Republic) M Bouzková	6	6
A Sasnovich	2	6	6
Q	(Spain) R Masarova	6	4	4

Second round
4	(France) C Garcia	5	4
(United States) M Keys	7	6
(United States) A Anisimova	6	4	6^{5}
15	V Azarenka	4	6	7^{7}
9	(Kazakhstan) E Rybakina	7	6
(Czech Republic) M Bouzková	5	2
A Sasnovich	0	4
5	(United States) C Gauff	6	6

Third round
(United States) M Keys	6	6
15	V Azarenka	2	1
9	(Kazakhstan) E Rybakina
5	(United States) C Gauff	w/o

Quarterfinals
(United States) M Keys	2	5
5	(United States) C Gauff	6	7

=== Bottom half ===
==== Section 3 ====
First round
WC	(Turkey) İ Öz	6	4	2
WC	(Ukraine) M Kostyuk	4	6	6
PR	(Czech Republic) K Muchová	6	6
(United States) B Pera	1	4
(Romania) S Cîrstea	4	7^{9}	7
11	(Brazil) B Haddad Maia	6	6^{7}	5
LL	(United States) C Liu	4	4
(United States) S Rogers	6	6
Q	(Germany) L Siegemund	5	3
Q	(Romania) A Bogdan	7	6
(Estonia) K Kanepi	3	1
Q	(Bulgaria) V Tomova	6	6

Second round
8	(Switzerland) B Bencic	6^{7}	7^{7}	6
WC	(Ukraine) M Kostyuk	7^{9}	6^{5}	4
PR	(Czech Republic) K Muchová	6	7^{7}
(Romania) S Cîrstea	4	6^{4}
(United States) S Rogers	6^{3}	3
Q	(Romania) A Bogdan	7^{7}	6
Q	(Bulgaria) V Tomova	2	7	1
3	(United States) J Pegula	6	5	6

Third round
8	(Switzerland) B Bencic	1	4
PR	(Czech Republic) K Muchová	6	6
Q	(Romania) A Bogdan	4	3
3	(United States) J Pegula	6	6

Quarterfinals
PR	(Czech Republic) K Muchová
3	(United States) J Pegula	w/o

==== Section 4 ====
First round
(Romania) I-C Begu	4	2
(Czech Republic) B Krejčíková	6	6
(Croatia) P Martić	4	6	2
(Kazakhstan) Y Putintseva	6	0	6
(Italy) M Trevisan	2	1
12	(Czech Republic) P Kvitová	6	6
13	(Latvia) J Ostapenko	6	6
Q	(Ukraine) K Zavatska	1	4
WC	(Czech Republic) L Fruhvirtová	6	6
(United States) D Collins	3	4
(Switzerland) J Teichmann	4	6	3
LL	(United States) L Davis	6	4	6

Second round
7	D Kasatkina	4	6	5
(Czech Republic) B Krejčíková	6	4	7
(Kazakhstan) Y Putintseva	4	4
12	(Czech Republic) P Kvitová	6	6
13	(Latvia) J Ostapenko	6	6
WC	(Czech Republic) L Fruhvirtová	2	0
LL	(United States) L Davis	0	1
2	A Sabalenka	6	6

Third round
(Czech Republic) B Krejčíková	6	6
12	(Czech Republic) P Kvitová	3	2
13	(Latvia) J Ostapenko	6	1	1
2	A Sabalenka	2	6	6

Quarterfinals
(Czech Republic) B Krejčíková	0	7^{7}	6
2	A Sabalenka	6	6^{2}	1

== Qualifying ==
=== Seeds ===
1. (United States) Lauren Davis (qualifying competition, lucky loser)
2. Anna Kalinskaya (first round)
3. (United States) Claire Liu (qualifying competition, lucky loser)
4. (Montenegro) Danka Kovinić (first round)
5. (Italy) Jasmine Paolini (qualified)
6. (Canada) Rebecca Marino (qualifying competition)
7. (Romania) Ana Bogdan (qualified)
8. (Belgium) Maryna Zanevska (first round)
9. (United States) Madison Brengle (first round)
10. (Spain) Cristina Bucșa (first round)
11. (Austria) Julia Grabher (qualified)
12. (Spain) Rebeka Masarova (qualified)
13. (Czech Republic) Tereza Martincová (qualifying competition)
14. (Ukraine) Dayana Yastremska (qualified)
15. (Bulgaria) Viktoriya Tomova (qualified)
16. (France) Océane Dodin (qualifying competition)

=== Qualifiers ===
1. (Ukraine) Dayana Yastremska
2. (Bulgaria) Viktoriya Tomova
3. (Germany) Laura Siegemund
4. (Ukraine) Katarina Zavatska
5. (Italy) Jasmine Paolini
6. (Spain) Rebeka Masarova
7. (Romania) Ana Bogdan
8. (Austria) Julia Grabher

=== Lucky losers ===
1. (United States) Lauren Davis
2. (United States) Claire Liu

=== Qualifying draw ===
==== First qualifier ====
First round
1	(United States) Lauren Davis	6	6
WC	(Kazakhstan) Anna Danilina	3	1
(Italy) Sara Errani	1	3
14	(Ukraine) Dayana Yastremska	6	6

Qualifying competition
1	(United States) Lauren Davis	3	3
14	(Ukraine) Dayana Yastremska	6	6

==== Second qualifier ====
First round
2	Anna Kalinskaya	6	6^{6}	2
(South Korea) Jang Su-jeong	3	7^{8}	6
WC	(India) Ankita Raina	6	1	4
15	(Bulgaria) Viktoriya Tomova	3	6	6

Qualifying competition
(South Korea) Jang Su-jeong	3	5
15	(Bulgaria) Viktoriya Tomova	6	7

==== Third qualifier ====
First round
3	(United States) Claire Liu	6	6
PR	(Slovakia) Kristína Kučová	3	4
(Germany) Laura Siegemund	6	6
10	(Spain) Cristina Bucșa	2	1

Qualifying competition
3	(United States) Claire Liu	4	4
(Germany) Laura Siegemund	6	6

==== Fourth qualifier ====
First round
4	(Montenegro) Danka Kovinić	3	6^{2}
WC	(Romania) Ștefania Bojică	6	7^{7}
PR	(Ukraine) Katarina Zavatska	3	6	6
9	(United States) Madison Brengle	6	1	4

Qualifying competition
WC	(Romania) Ștefania Bojică	2	1
PR	(Ukraine) Katarina Zavatska	6	6

==== Fifth qualifier ====
First round
5	(Italy) Jasmine Paolini	6	6
PR	Margarita Betova	4	1
(Hungary) Réka Luca Jani	6	2	2
16	(France) Océane Dodin	3	6	6

Qualifying competition
5	(Italy) Jasmine Paolini	6	7
16	(France) Océane Dodin	1	5

==== Sixth qualifier ====
First round
6	(Canada) Rebecca Marino	7^{7}	6^{5}	6
(United Kingdom) Harriet Dart	6^{1}	7^{7}	1
(Serbia) Olga Danilović	3	2
12	(Spain) Rebeka Masarova	6	6

Qualifying competition
6	(Canada) Rebecca Marino	6	3	6^{5}
12	(Spain) Rebeka Masarova	4	6	7^{7}

==== Seventh qualifier ====
First round
7	(Romania) Ana Bogdan	6	6
(France) Clara Burel	0	3
(Poland) Magdalena Fręch	4	4
13	(Czech Republic) Tereza Martincová	6	6

Qualifying competition
7	(Romania) Ana Bogdan	6	7
13	(Czech Republic) Tereza Martincová	4	5

==== Eighth qualifier ====
First round
8	(Belgium) Maryna Zanevska	6	3	2
(France) Kristina Mladenovic	3	6	6
WC	(United Kingdom) Eden Silva	2	3
11	(Austria) Julia Grabher	6	6

Qualifying competition
(France) Kristina Mladenovic	3	2
11	(Austria) Julia Grabher	6	6
