= 2023 Dubai Tennis Championships – Men's doubles =

Men's doubles
- 2023 Dubai Tennis Championships

Final
- Champions: (United States) Maxime Cressy (France) Fabrice Martin
- Runners-up: (United Kingdom) Lloyd Glasspool (Finland) Harri Heliövaara
- Score: 7–6^{(7–2)}, 6–4

Details
- Draw: 16
- Seeds: 4

Events
Singles	men	women
Doubles	men	women
- Dubai Tennis Championships

Maxime Cressy and Fabrice Martin defeated Lloyd Glasspool and Harri Heliövaara in the final, 7–6^{(7–2)}, 6–4 to win the men's doubles tennis title at the 2023 Dubai Tennis Championships.

Tim Pütz and Michael Venus were the reigning champions, but Venus chose to compete in Acapulco instead. Pütz partnered Kevin Krawietz, but lost in the first round to Glasspool and Heliövaara.

== Seeds ==
1. (Croatia) Nikola Mektić / (Croatia) Mate Pavić (semifinals)
2. (Croatia) Ivan Dodig / (United States) Austin Krajicek (first round)
3. (United Kingdom) Lloyd Glasspool / (Finland) Harri Heliövaara (final)
4. (Monaco) Hugo Nys / (Poland) Jan Zieliński (first round)

== Draw ==
Key

- Q = Qualifier
- WC = Wild card
- LL = Lucky loser
- Alt = Alternate
- ITF = ITF entry
- PR = Protected ranking
- SR = Special ranking
- SE = Special exempt
- JE = Junior exempt
- JR = Junior Accelerator Programme entrant
- CO = College Accelerator Programme entrant
- NG = Next Gen Accelerator Program entrant
- w/o = Walkover
- r = Retired
- d = Defaulted

=== Draw ===
First round
1	(Croatia) N Mektić (Croatia) M Pavić	7	4	[10]
(India) R Bopanna (Australia) M Ebden	5	6	[7]
(Bosnia and Herzegovina) T Brkić (Ecuador) G Escobar	6	6
WC	(United States) K Al Allaf (United Arab Emirates) A Al Janahi	1	3
3	(United Kingdom) L Glasspool (Finland) H Heliövaara	7^{7}	6
(Germany) K Krawietz (Germany) T Pütz	6^{3}	2
LL	(India) Y Bhambri (India) S Myneni	6	7
(Brazil) M Melo (Germany) A Zverev	3	5
(Netherlands) R Haase (Netherlands) M Middelkoop	6	6
Q	(Australia) A Harris (Australia) J-P Smith	4	2
(United States) M Cressy (France) F Martin	6	7^{15}
4	(Monaco) H Nys (Poland) J Zieliński	3	6^{13}
LL	(Belgium) S Gillé (Belgium) J Vliegen	6	3	[10]
WC	(Pakistan) A-u-H Qureshi (India) R Ramanathan	4	6	[5]
I Ivashka; A Rublev	7^{7}	2	[10]
2	(Croatia) I Dodig (United States) A Krajicek	6^{3}	6	[8]

Quarterfinals
1	(Croatia) N Mektić (Croatia) M Pavić	3	6	[10]
(Bosnia and Herzegovina) T Brkić (Ecuador) G Escobar	6	3	[7]
3	(United Kingdom) L Glasspool (Finland) H Heliövaara	6	6
LL	(India) Y Bhambri (India) S Myneni	2	2
(Netherlands) R Haase (Netherlands) M Middelkoop	4	3
(United States) M Cressy (France) F Martin	6	6
LL	(Belgium) S Gillé (Belgium) J Vliegen	7^{7}	7^{7}
I Ivashka; A Rublev	6^{4}	6^{3}

Semifinals
1	(Croatia) N Mektić (Croatia) M Pavić	4	2
3	(United Kingdom) L Glasspool (Finland) H Heliövaara	6	6
(United States) M Cressy (France) F Martin	5	7^{7}	[10]
LL	(Belgium) S Gillé (Belgium) J Vliegen	7	6^{5}	[7]

Final
3	(United Kingdom) L Glasspool (Finland) H Heliövaara	6^{2}	4
(United States) M Cressy (France) F Martin	7^{7}	6

== Qualifying ==
=== Seeds ===
1. (Belgium) Sander Gillé / (Belgium) Joran Vliegen (first round, lucky losers)
2. (India) Yuki Bhambri / (India) Saketh Myneni (qualifying competition, lucky losers)

=== Qualifiers ===
1. (Australia) Andrew Harris / (Australia) John-Patrick Smith

=== Lucky losers ===
1. (India) Yuki Bhambri / (India) Saketh Myneni
2. (Belgium) Sander Gillé / (Belgium) Joran Vliegen

=== Qualifying draw ===
First round
1	(Belgium) Sander Gillé (Belgium) Joran Vliegen	5	4
(Australia) Andrew Harris (Australia) John-Patrick Smith	7	6
WC	(Lebanon) Benjamin Hassan (Algeria) Nazim Makhlouf	2	6^{1}
2	(India) Yuki Bhambri (India) Saketh Myneni	6	7^{7}

Qualifying competition
(Australia) Andrew Harris (Australia) John-Patrick Smith	1	7^{7}	[10]
2	(India) Yuki Bhambri (India) Saketh Myneni	6	6^{4}	[8]
