= 2023 ABN AMRO Open – Doubles =

Doubles
- 2023 ABN AMRO Open

Final
- Champions: (Croatia) Ivan Dodig (United States) Austin Krajicek
- Runners-up: (India) Rohan Bopanna (Australia) Matthew Ebden
- Score: 7–6^{(7–5)}, 2–6, [12–10]

Details
- Draw: 16 (1Q, 2WC)
- Seeds: 4

Events
Singles	Doubles
← 2022 ·	ABN AMRO Open	· 2024 →

Ivan Dodig and Austin Krajicek defeated Rohan Bopanna and Matthew Ebden in the final, 7–6^{(7–5)}, 2–6, [12–10] to win the doubles tennis title at the 2023 Rotterdam Open. The pair saved a championship point en route to the title.

Robin Haase and Matwé Middelkoop were the defending champions, but lost in the first round to Santiago González and Édouard Roger-Vasselin.

Wesley Koolhof and Neal Skupski will lose the joint ATP No. 1 doubles ranking at the end of the tournament, as a result of their first-round loss.

== Seeds ==
1. (Netherlands) Wesley Koolhof / (United Kingdom) Neal Skupski (first round)
2. (Croatia) Nikola Mektić / (Croatia) Mate Pavić (first round)
3. (Croatia) Ivan Dodig / (United States) Austin Krajicek (champions)
4. (United Kingdom) Lloyd Glasspool / (Finland) Harri Heliövaara (quarterfinals)

== Draw ==
=== Key ===
- Q = Qualifier
- WC = Wild card
- LL = Lucky loser
- Alt = Alternate
- ITF = ITF entry
- PR = Protected ranking
- SR = Special ranking
- SE = Special exempt
- JE = Junior exempt
- JR = Junior Accelerator Programme entrant
- CO = College Accelerator Programme entrant
- NG = Next Gen Accelerator Program entrant
- w/o = Walkover
- r = Retired
- d = Defaulted

=== Draw ===
First round
1	(Netherlands) W Koolhof (United Kingdom) N Skupski	3	3
(Germany) K Krawietz (Germany) T Pütz	6	6
(Bulgaria) G Dimitrov (France) N Mahut	6	6
(Germany) A Mies (Australia) J Peers	3	3
4	(United Kingdom) L Glasspool (Finland) H Heliövaara	6	6
WC	(Greece) Pe Tsitsipas (Greece) S Tsitsipas	3	4
(India) R Bopanna (Australia) M Ebden	7^{8}	4	[10]
(Monaco) H Nys (Poland) J Zieliński	6^{6}	6	[5]
(Netherlands) R Haase (Netherlands) M Middelkoop	6^{6}	4
(Mexico) S González (France) É Roger-Vasselin	7^{8}	6
(France) F Martin; A Rublev	6	4	[4]
3	(Croatia) I Dodig (United States) A Krajicek	3	6	[10]
Q	(Belgium) S Gillé (Belgium) J Vliegen	6	5	[10]
WC	(Netherlands) T Griekspoor (Netherlands) B van de Zandschulp	3	7	[3]
PR	(Kazakhstan) A Bublik (Switzerland) S Wawrinka	3	7^{7}	[10]
2	(Croatia) N Mektić (Croatia) M Pavić	6	6^{3}	[7]

Quarterfinals
(Germany) K Krawietz (Germany) T Pütz	3	6	[10]
(Bulgaria) G Dimitrov (France) N Mahut	6	3	[8]
4	(United Kingdom) L Glasspool (Finland) H Heliövaara	2	1
(India) R Bopanna (Australia) M Ebden	6	6
(Mexico) S González (France) É Roger-Vasselin	6^{5}	6^{5}
3	(Croatia) I Dodig (United States) A Krajicek	7^{7}	7^{7}
Q	(Belgium) S Gillé (Belgium) J Vliegen	6	6
PR	(Kazakhstan) A Bublik (Switzerland) S Wawrinka	4	4

Semifinals
(Germany) K Krawietz (Germany) T Pütz	4	4
(India) R Bopanna (Australia) M Ebden	6	6
3	(Croatia) I Dodig (United States) A Krajicek	6	7^{7}
Q	(Belgium) S Gillé (Belgium) J Vliegen	4	6^{3}

Final
(India) R Bopanna (Australia) M Ebden	6^{5}	6	[10]
3	(Croatia) I Dodig (United States) A Krajicek	7^{7}	2	[12]

== Qualifying ==
=== Seeds ===
1. (Belgium) Sander Gillé / (Belgium) Joran Vliegen (qualified)
2. (France) Jonathan Eysseric / (Ukraine) Denys Molchanov (first round)

=== Qualifiers ===
1. (Belgium) Sander Gillé / (Belgium) Joran Vliegen

=== Qualifying draw ===
First round
1	(Belgium) Sander Gillé (Belgium) Joran Vliegen	6	6^{5}	[11]
(Italy) Marco Bortolotti (Spain) Sergio Martos Gornés	3	7^{7}	[9]
WC	(Netherlands) Gijs Brouwer (Netherlands) Jesper de Jong	6	6
2	(France) Jonathan Eysseric (Ukraine) Denys Molchanov	3	4

Qualifying competition
1	(Belgium) Sander Gillé (Belgium) Joran Vliegen	6	6
WC	(Netherlands) Gijs Brouwer (Netherlands) Jesper de Jong	4	3
