= 2023 Dubai Tennis Championships – Men's singles =

Men's singles
- 2023 Dubai Tennis Championships

Final
- Champion: Daniil Medvedev
- Runner-up: Andrey Rublev
- Score: 6–2, 6–2

Details
- Draw: 32 (3WC, 4Q)
- Seeds: 8

Events
Singles	men	women
Doubles	men	women
- Dubai Tennis Championships

Daniil Medvedev defeated defending champion Andrey Rublev in the final, 6–2, 6–2 to win the men's singles tennis title at the 2023 Dubai Tennis Championships. It was his third ATP Tour title in as many weeks, following titles in Rotterdam and Doha. He did not drop a set en route to the title.

Novak Djokovic and Carlos Alcaraz were in contention for the world No. 1 singles ranking. Djokovic retained the top ranking after Alcaraz withdrew from Acapulco. Medvedev ended Djokovic's 21-match winning streak in the semifinals, which dated back to the 2022 ATP Finals.

This tournament marked the final professional appearance of former top-50 player Malek Jaziri. He lost in the first round to Alejandro Davidovich Fokina.

== Seeds ==
1. (Serbia) Novak Djokovic (semifinals)
2. Andrey Rublev (final)
3. Daniil Medvedev (champion)
4. (Canada) Félix Auger-Aliassime (second round)
5. (Poland) Hubert Hurkacz (quarterfinals)
6. Karen Khachanov (first round)
7. (Germany) Alexander Zverev (semifinals)
8. (Croatia) Borna Ćorić (quarterfinals)

== Draw ==
Key

- Q = Qualifier
- WC = Wild card
- LL = Lucky loser
- Alt = Alternate
- ITF = ITF entry
- PR = Protected ranking
- SR = Special ranking
- SE = Special exempt
- JE = Junior exempt
- JR = Junior Accelerator Programme entrant
- CO = College Accelerator Programme entrant
- NG = Next Gen Accelerator Program entrant
- w/o = Walkover
- r = Retired
- d = Defaulted

=== Finals ===
Semifinals
1	(Serbia) Novak Djokovic	4	4
3	Daniil Medvedev	6	6
7	(Germany) Alexander Zverev	3	6^{9}
2	Andrey Rublev	6	7^{11}

Final
3	Daniil Medvedev	6	6
2	Andrey Rublev	2	2

=== Top half ===
First round
1	(Serbia) N Djokovic	6	3	7^{7}
Q	(Czech Republic) T Macháč	3	6	6^{1}
(Netherlands) T Griekspoor	6	3	6
(France) C Lestienne	4	6	2
WC	(Australia) A Popyrin	3	7	6^{3}
Q	P Kotov	6	5	7^{7}
LL	A Shevchenko	6	3	6^{7}
5	(Poland) H Hurkacz	3	6	7^{9}
3	D Medvedev	6	6
LL	(Italy) M Arnaldi	4	2
(Kazakhstan) A Bublik	6	1
Q	(Bulgaria) A Lazarov	1	0^{r}
WC	(Australia) T Kokkinakis	6	7^{11}
LL	(France) Q Halys	4	6^{9}
(United Kingdom) D Evans	2^{r}
8	(Croatia) B Ćorić	2

Second round
1	(Serbia) N Djokovic	6	6
(Netherlands) T Griekspoor	2	3
Q	P Kotov	5	1
5	(Poland) H Hurkacz	7	6
3	D Medvedev	6	6
(Kazakhstan) A Bublik	4	2
WC	(Australia) T Kokkinakis	7^{7}	3	5
8	(Croatia) B Ćorić	6^{4}	6	7

Quarterfinals
1	(Serbia) N Djokovic	6	7
5	(Poland) H Hurkacz	3	5
3	D Medvedev	6	6
8	(Croatia) B Ćorić	3	2

Semifinals
1	(Serbia) N Djokovic	4	4
3	D Medvedev	6	6

=== Bottom half ===
First round
7	(Germany) A Zverev	4	6	6
(Czech Republic) J Lehečka	6	3	4
(Finland) E Ruusuvuori	5	4
Q	(Australia) C O'Connell	7	6
(Switzerland) M-A Hüsler	5	3
(Italy) L Sonego	7	6
(United States) M Cressy	6^{4}	6	3
4	(Canada) F Auger-Aliassime	7^{7}	3	6
6	K Khachanov	5	2
(Netherlands) B van de Zandschulp	7	6
LL	(Italy) F Passaro	2	3
(Sweden) M Ymer	6	6
WC	(Tunisia) M Jaziri	2	0
(Spain) A Davidovich Fokina	6	6
(Serbia) F Krajinović	5	2
2	A Rublev	7	6

Second round
7	(Germany) A Zverev	7	6
Q	(Australia) C O'Connell	5	4
(Italy) L Sonego	7^{7}	6
4	(Canada) F Auger-Aliassime	6^{4}	4
(Netherlands) B van de Zandschulp	3	6	6
(Sweden) M Ymer	6	3	3
(Spain) A Davidovich Fokina	6	6^{6}	6^{3}
2	A Rublev	1	7^{8}	7^{7}

Quarterfinals
7	(Germany) A Zverev	7	6
(Italy) L Sonego	5	4
(Netherlands) B van de Zandschulp	3	6^{3}
2	A Rublev	6	7^{7}

Semifinals
7	(Germany) A Zverev	3	6^{9}
2	A Rublev	6	7^{11}

== Qualifying ==
=== Seeds ===
1. (France) Quentin Halys (qualifying competition, lucky loser)
2. (Hungary) Márton Fucsovics (first round)
3. Ilya Ivashka (first round)
4. (China) Zhang Zhizhen (first round)
5. (Australia) Christopher O'Connell (qualified)
6. Roman Safiullin (first round)
7. (Italy) Francesco Passaro (qualifying competition, lucky loser)
8. (Italy) Matteo Arnaldi (qualifying competition, lucky loser)

=== Qualifiers ===
1. (Australia) Christopher O'Connell
2. (Czech Republic) Tomáš Macháč
3. Pavel Kotov
4. (Bulgaria) Alexandar Lazarov

=== Lucky losers ===
1. (France) Quentin Halys
2. (Italy) Matteo Arnaldi
3. (Italy) Francesco Passaro
4. Alexander Shevchenko

=== Qualifying draw ===
==== First qualifier ====
First round
1	(France) Quentin Halys	4	6	3
(Georgia (country)) Nikoloz Basilashvili	6	3	0^{r}
WC	(United States) Kareem Al Allaf	3	4
5	(Australia) Christopher O'Connell	6	6

Qualifying competition
1	(France) Quentin Halys	6^{6}	6^{4}
5	(Australia) Christopher O'Connell	7^{8}	7^{7}

==== Second qualifier ====
First round
2	(Hungary) Márton Fucsovics	6	2	4
(Czech Republic) Tomáš Macháč	4	6	6
WC	(Republic of Ireland) Simon Carr	5	4
8	(Italy) Matteo Arnaldi	7	6

Qualifying competition
(Czech Republic) Tomáš Macháč	6	6
8	(Italy) Matteo Arnaldi	0	1

==== Third qualifier ====
First round
3	Ilya Ivashka	6	6^{2}	2
Alexander Shevchenko	4	7^{7}	6
Pavel Kotov	5	6	6
6	Roman Safiullin	7	2	4

Qualifying competition
Alexander Shevchenko	3	0^{r}
Pavel Kotov	6	2

==== Fourth qualifier ====
First round
4	(China) Zhang Zhizhen	1	6^{5}
WC	(Bulgaria) Alexandar Lazarov	6	7^{7}
PR	(India) Yuki Bhambri	1^{r}
7	(Italy) Francesco Passaro	4

Qualifying competition
WC	(Bulgaria) Alexandar Lazarov	7	7
7	(Italy) Francesco Passaro	5	5
