= 2023 Erste Bank Open – Doubles =

Doubles
- 2023 Erste Bank Open

Final
- Champions: (United States) Rajeev Ram (United Kingdom) Joe Salisbury
- Runners-up: (United States) Nathaniel Lammons (United States) Jackson Withrow
- Score: 6–4, 5–7, [12–10]

Details
- Draw: 16
- Seeds: 4

Events
Singles	Doubles
- Vienna Open

Rajeev Ram and Joe Salisbury defeated Nathaniel Lammons and Jackson Withrow in the final, 6–4, 5–7, [12–10] to win the doubles tennis title at the 2023 Vienna Open.

Alexander Erler and Lucas Miedler were the defending champions, but lost in the first round to Sebastian Ofner and Philipp Oswald.

Wesley Koolhof was in contention to reclaim the ATP No. 1 doubles ranking, but lost in the first round.

== Seeds ==
1. (Netherlands) Wesley Koolhof / (United Kingdom) Neal Skupski (first round)
2. (United States) Rajeev Ram / (United Kingdom) Joe Salisbury (champions)
3. (El Salvador) Marcelo Arévalo / (Netherlands) Jean-Julien Rojer (semifinals)
4. (Belgium) Sander Gillé / (Belgium) Joran Vliegen (first round)

== Draw ==
Key

- Q = Qualifier
- WC = Wild card
- LL = Lucky loser
- Alt = Alternate
- ITF = ITF entry
- PR = Protected ranking
- SR = Special ranking
- SE = Special exempt
- JE = Junior exempt
- JR = Junior Accelerator Programme entrant
- CO = College Accelerator Programme entrant
- NG = Next Gen Accelerator Program entrant
- w/o = Walkover
- r = Retired
- d = Defaulted

=== Draw ===
First round
1	(Netherlands) W Koolhof (United Kingdom) N Skupski	6	6^{5}	[4]
(France) S Doumbia (France) F Reboul	2	7^{7}	[10]
(Netherlands) M Middelkoop (Germany) A Mies	7^{7}	6
(Argentina) F Cerúndolo (Brazil) R Matos	6^{5}	4
4	(Belgium) S Gillé (Belgium) J Vliegen	4	4
(United States) N Lammons (United States) J Withrow	6	6
(United Kingdom) C Norrie (United States) T Paul	6	6
LL	(Ecuador) G Escobar (Kazakhstan) A Nedovyesov	3	0
WC	(Austria) S Ofner (Austria) P Oswald	7^{7}	4	[11]
(Austria) A Erler (Austria) L Miedler	6^{4}	6	[9]
(Croatia) N Mektić (Australia) J Peers	7^{7}	4	[8]
3	(El Salvador) M Arévalo (Netherlands) J-J Rojer	6^{3}	6	[10]
LL	(Austria) N Oberleitner (Austria) J Rodionov	4	3
WC	(Monaco) R Arneodo (Austria) S Weissborn	6	6
Q	(Portugal) F Cabral (United Kingdom) H Patten	3	6	[7]
2	(United States) R Ram (United Kingdom) J Salisbury	6	3	[10]

Quarterfinals
(France) S Doumbia (France) F Reboul	6^{5}	7^{9}	[12]
(Netherlands) M Middelkoop (Germany) A Mies	7^{7}	6^{7}	[10]
(United States) N Lammons (United States) J Withrow	4
(United Kingdom) C Norrie (United States) T Paul	3^{r}
WC	(Austria) S Ofner (Austria) P Oswald	6^{4}	1
3	(El Salvador) M Arévalo (Netherlands) J-J Rojer	7^{7}	6
WC	(Monaco) R Arneodo (Austria) S Weissborn	3	6^{7}
2	(United States) R Ram (United Kingdom) J Salisbury	6	7^{9}

Semifinals
(France) S Doumbia (France) F Reboul	6	6^{1}	[7]
(United States) N Lammons (United States) J Withrow	4	7^{7}	[10]
3	(El Salvador) M Arévalo (Netherlands) J-J Rojer	7^{7}	3	[6]
2	(United States) R Ram (United Kingdom) J Salisbury	6^{2}	6	[10]

Final
(United States) N Lammons (United States) J Withrow	4	7	[10]
2	(United States) R Ram (United Kingdom) J Salisbury	6	5	[12]

== Qualifying ==
=== Seeds ===
1. (Ecuador) Gonzalo Escobar / (Kazakhstan) Aleksandr Nedovyesov (qualifying competition, lucky losers)
2. (Portugal) Francisco Cabral / (United Kingdom) Henry Patten (qualified)

=== Qualifiers ===
1. (Portugal) Francisco Cabral / (United Kingdom) Henry Patten

=== Lucky losers ===
1. (Ecuador) Gonzalo Escobar / (Kazakhstan) Aleksandr Nedovyesov
2. (Austria) Neil Oberleitner / (Austria) Jurij Rodionov

=== Qualifying draw ===
First round
1	(Ecuador) Gonzalo Escobar (Kazakhstan) Aleksandr Nedovyesov	7^{7}	6
WC	(Austria) Neil Oberleitner (Austria) Jurij Rodionov	6^{3}	1
(Czech Republic) Roman Jebavý (Czech Republic) Petr Nouza	6	1	[5]
2	(Portugal) Francisco Cabral (United Kingdom) Henry Patten	4	6	[10]

Qualifying competition
1	(Ecuador) Gonzalo Escobar (Kazakhstan) Aleksandr Nedovyesov	1	6	[3]
2	(Portugal) Francisco Cabral (United Kingdom) Henry Patten	6	3	[10]
