= 2023 Halle Open =

- Date: 19–25 June
- Edition: 30th
- Category: ATP Tour 500
- Draw: 32S / 16D
- Prize money: €2,195,175
- Surface: Grass
- Location: Halle, Germany
- Venue: OWL Arena

Champions

Singles
- (Kazakhstan) Alexander Bublik

Doubles
- (Brazil) Marcelo Melo / (Australia) John Peers
- Halle Open

The 2023 Halle Open (known for sponsorship reasons as the Terra Wortmann Open) was a men's tennis tournament played on outdoor grass courts. It was the 30th edition of the Halle Open and part of the ATP Tour 500 series of the 2023 ATP Tour. It took place at the OWL Arena in Halle, Germany, between 19 June and 25 June 2023. Unseeded Alexander Bublik won the singles title.

== Finals ==
=== Singles ===
- (Kazakhstan) Alexander Bublik def. Andrey Rublev, 6–3, 3–6, 6–3

=== Doubles ===
- (Brazil) Marcelo Melo / (Australia) John Peers def. (Italy) Simone Bolelli / (Italy) Andrea Vavassori, 7–6^{(7–3)}, 3–6, [10–6]

== Points and prize money ==
=== Points distribution ===
Event	W	F	SF	QF	Round of 16	Round of 32	Q	Q2	Q1
Singles	500	300	180	90	45	0	20	10	0
Doubles	500	300	180	90	45	0	45	25	0

=== Prize money ===
Event	W	F	SF	QF	Round of 16	Round of 32	Q2	Q1
Singles	€477,795	€220,800	€117,715	€60,145	€32,105	€17,120	€8,775	€4,925
Doubles*	€134,840	€71,910	€36,380	€18,190	€9,420	€	—N/a	—N/a

_{*per team}

== Singles main draw entrants ==
=== Seeds ===
Country	Player	Rank^{1}	Seed
	Daniil Medvedev	3	1
GRE	Stefanos Tsitsipas	5	2
	Andrey Rublev	7	3
ITA	Jannik Sinner	9	4
~~CAN~~	~~Félix Auger-Aliassime~~	~~11~~	~~5~~
POL	Hubert Hurkacz	14	6
CRO	Borna Ćorić	15	7
ESP	Roberto Bautista Agut	22	8
GER	Alexander Zverev	23	9

- ^{1} Rankings are as of 12 June 2023.

=== Other entrants ===
The following players received wildcards into the main draw:

- (Germany) Yannick Hanfmann
- (Germany) Oscar Otte
- (Austria) Dominic Thiem
- (Greece) Stefanos Tsitsipas

The following player received entry using a protected ranking:

- (South Africa) Lloyd Harris

The following players received entry from the qualifying draw:

- (United States) Christopher Eubanks
- (United States) Marcos Giron
- Roman Safiullin
- (Germany) Louis Wessels

The following player received entry as lucky losers:

- (Italy) Andrea Vavassori
- Aslan Karatsev

=== Withdrawals ===
- (Canada) Félix Auger-Aliassime → replaced by (Italy) Andrea Vavassori
- (Spain) Pablo Carreño Busta → replaced by (Serbia) Laslo Djere
- Karen Khachanov → replaced by (Spain) Roberto Carballés Baena
- (Australia) Nick Kyrgios → replaced by Aslan Karatsev
- (Norway) Casper Ruud → replaced by (China) Wu Yibing

== Doubles main draw entrants ==
=== Seeds ===
Country	Player	Country	Player	Rank^{1}	Seed
ESA	Marcelo Arévalo	NED	Jean-Julien Rojer	26	1
ESP	Marcel Granollers	ARG	Horacio Zeballos	41	2
BEL	Sander Gillé	BEL	Joran Vliegen	51	3
GER	Kevin Krawietz	GER	Tim Pütz	52	4

- ^{1} Rankings are as of 12 June 2023.

=== Other entrants ===
The following pairs received wildcards into the doubles main draw:

- (Brazil) Marcelo Demoliner / (Germany) Andreas Mies
- (Germany) Oscar Otte / (Germany) Jan-Lennard Struff

The following pair received entry from the qualifying draw:

- (France) Albano Olivetti / (Spain) David Vega Hernández

=== Withdrawals ===
- (Argentina) Máximo González / (Argentina) Andrés Molteni → replaced by (Italy) Simone Bolelli / (Italy) Andrea Vavassori
- Karen Khachanov / Andrey Rublev → replaced by Andrey Rublev / (Germany) Alexander Zverev
