= 2023 ABN AMRO Open =

- Date: 13–19 February
- Edition: 50th
- Category: ATP Tour 500
- Draw: 32S / 16D
- Prize money: €2,224,460
- Surface: Hard (indoor)
- Location: Rotterdam, Netherlands
- Venue: Rotterdam Ahoy

Champions

Singles
- Daniil Medvedev

Doubles
- (Croatia) Ivan Dodig / (United States) Austin Krajicek

Wheelchair men's singles
- (United Kingdom) Alfie Hewett

Wheelchair women's singles
- (Netherlands) Diede de Groot

Wheelchair men's doubles
- (United Kingdom) Alfie Hewett / (United Kingdom) Gordon Reid

Wheelchair women's doubles
- (Netherlands) Diede de Groot / (Netherlands) Aniek van Koot
- Rotterdam Open

The 2023 ABN AMRO Open was a men's tennis tournament played on indoor hard courts. It took place at the Rotterdam Ahoy in the Dutch city of Rotterdam, between 13 and 19 February 2023. It was the 50th edition of the Rotterdam Open, and part of the ATP Tour 500 series on the 2023 ATP Tour. The tournament also included a wheelchair tennis singles and doubles draw for both men and women. This was the first year that the women's wheelchair tournament took place.

== Finals ==
=== Singles ===
- Daniil Medvedev defeated (Italy) Jannik Sinner, 5–7, 6–2, 6–2

=== Doubles ===
- (Croatia) Ivan Dodig / (United States) Austin Krajicek defeated (India) Rohan Bopanna / (Australia) Matthew Ebden, 7–6^{(7–5)}, 2–6, [12–10]

== Points and prize money ==
=== Point distribution ===
Event	W	F	SF	QF	Round of 16	Round of 32	Q	Q2	Q1
Singles	500	300	180	90	45	0	20	10	0
Doubles	500	300	180	90	0	—N/a	—N/a	—N/a	—N/a

=== Prize money ===
Event	W	F	SF	QF	Round of 16	Round of 32	Q2	Q1
Singles	€387,940	€208,730	€111,245	€56,835	€30,345	€16,180	€8,295	€4,650
Doubles*	€127,440	€67,960	€34,380	€17,190	€8,900	—N/a	—N/a	—N/a
Doubles prize money per team

== Singles main-draw entrants ==
=== Seeds ===
Country	Player	Ranking^{1}	Seed
GRE	Stefanos Tsitsipas	3	1
	Andrey Rublev	5	2
CAN	Félix Auger-Aliassime	7	3
DEN	Holger Rune	9	4
POL	Hubert Hurkacz	10	5
	Daniil Medvedev	12	6
ESP	Pablo Carreño Busta	15	7
GER	Alexander Zverev	16	8

- ^{1} Rankings are as of 6 February 2023.

=== Other entrants ===
The following players received wildcards into the main draw:

- (Netherlands) Gijs Brouwer
- (Netherlands) Tallon Griekspoor
- (Netherlands) Tim van Rijthoven

The following player received entry using a protected ranking into the singles main draw:

- (Switzerland) Stan Wawrinka

The following players received entry from the qualifying draw:

- (France) Grégoire Barrère
- Aslan Karatsev
- (France) Constant Lestienne
- (Sweden) Mikael Ymer

The following player received entry as lucky loser:

- (France) Quentin Halys

=== Withdrawals ===
- (Croatia) Borna Ćorić → replaced by (France) Quentin Halys
- (United Kingdom) Dan Evans → replaced by (Belgium) David Goffin
- Karen Khachanov → replaced by (France) Benjamin Bonzi

== Doubles main-draw entrants ==
=== Seeds ===
Country	Player	Country	Player	Rank^{1}	Seed
NED	Wesley Koolhof	GBR	Neal Skupski	2	1
CRO	Nikola Mektić	CRO	Mate Pavić	15	2
CRO	Ivan Dodig	USA	Austin Krajicek	20	3
GBR	Lloyd Glasspool	FIN	Harri Heliövaara	22	4

- ^{1} Rankings as of 6 February 2023.

=== Other entrants ===
The following pairs received wildcards into the doubles main draw:

- (Netherlands) Tallon Griekspoor / (Netherlands) Botic van de Zandschulp
- (Greece) Petros Tsitsipas / (Greece) Stefanos Tsitsipas

The following pair received entry from the qualifying draw:

- (Belgium) Sander Gillé / (Belgium) Joran Vliegen

=== Withdrawals ===
- Karen Khachanov / Andrey Rublev → replaced by (France) Fabrice Martin / Andrey Rublev
