= 2023 Erste Bank Open – Singles =

Singles
- 2023 Erste Bank Open

Final
- Champion: (Italy) Jannik Sinner
- Runner-up: Daniil Medvedev
- Score: 7–6^{(9–7)}, 4–6, 6–3

Details
- Draw: 32 (4 Q / 3 WC )
- Seeds: 8

Events
Singles	Doubles
← 2022 ·	Erste Bank Open	· 2024 →

Jannik Sinner defeated the defending champion Daniil Medvedev in the final, 7–6^{(9–7)}, 4–6, 6–3 to win the singles tennis title at the 2023 Vienna Open. It was his tenth ATP Tour singles title.

== Seeds ==
1. Daniil Medvedev (final)
2. (Italy) Jannik Sinner (champion)
3. Andrey Rublev (semifinals)
4. (Greece) Stefanos Tsitsipas (semifinals)
5. (Germany) Alexander Zverev (quarterfinals)
6. (United States) Tommy Paul (second round)
7. (United States) Frances Tiafoe (quarterfinals)
8. Karen Khachanov (quarterfinals)

== Draw ==
=== Key ===
- Q = Qualifier
- WC = Wild card
- LL = Lucky loser
- Alt = Alternate
- SE = Special exempt
- PR = Protected ranking
- ITF = ITF entry
- JE = Junior exempt
- w/o = Walkover
- r = Retired
- d = Defaulted
- SR = Special ranking

=== Finals ===
Semifinals
1	Daniil Medvedev	6	7^{8}
4	(Greece) Stefanos Tsitsipas	4	6^{6}
3	Andrey Rublev	5	6^{5}
2	(Italy) Jannik Sinner	7	7^{7}

Final
1	Daniil Medvedev	6^{7}	6	3
2	(Italy) Jannik Sinner	7^{9}	4	6

=== Top half ===
First round
1	D Medvedev	6	6
(France) A Fils	4	2
(Bulgaria) G Dimitrov	6	6
(Italy) L Musetti	3	4
(United States) JJ Wolf	4	4
(Czech Republic) J Lehečka	6	6
R Safiullin	4	4
8	K Khachanov	6	6
4	(Greece) S Tsitsipas	7^{7}	6
WC	(Austria) D Thiem	6^{5}	4
(Australia) A Vukic	3	1
Q	(Czech Republic) T Macháč	6	6
SE	A Karatsev	3	3
WC	(Croatia) B Gojo	6	6
Q	(France) A Müller	3	1
6	(United States) T Paul	6	6

Second round
1	D Medvedev	3	6	6
(Bulgaria) G Dimitrov	6	2	4
(Czech Republic) J Lehečka	3	1
8	K Khachanov	6	6
4	(Greece) S Tsitsipas	6	4	7
Q	(Czech Republic) T Macháč	3	6	5
WC	(Croatia) B Gojo	6	6
6	(United States) T Paul	3	4

Quarterfinals
1	D Medvedev	6	3	6
8	K Khachanov	3	6	3
4	(Greece) S Tsitsipas	7^{7}	7
WC	(Croatia) B Gojo	6^{4}	5

Semifinals
1	D Medvedev	6	7^{8}
4	(Greece) S Tsitsipas	4	6^{6}

=== Bottom half ===
First round
5	(Germany) A Zverev	6	6
WC	(Austria) S Ofner	4	1
(United Kingdom) C Norrie	7^{9}	4	6
Q	(Austria) F Misolic	6^{7}	6	3
Q	(Spain) A Ramos Viñolas	6^{4}	6^{2}
(Italy) M Arnaldi	7^{7}	7^{7}
(Australia) A Popyrin	6^{5}	4
3	A Rublev	7^{7}	6
7	(United States) F Tiafoe	1
(United Kingdom) D Evans	4^{r}
PR	(France) G Monfils	6	6
(Germany) D Altmaier	4	4
LL	(Italy) L Sonego	6	5	6
(Argentina) F Cerúndolo	4	7	2
(United States) B Shelton	6^{2}	5
2	(Italy) J Sinner	7^{7}	7

Second round
5	(Germany) A Zverev	6	6
(United Kingdom) C Norrie	2	4
(Italy) M Arnaldi	5	3
3	A Rublev	7	6
7	(United States) F Tiafoe	5	6	6
PR	(France) G Monfils	7	1	4
LL	(Italy) L Sonego	2	4
2	(Italy) J Sinner	6	6

Quarterfinals
5	(Germany) A Zverev	1	7^{7}	3
3	A Rublev	6	6^{5}	6
7	(United States) F Tiafoe	3	4
2	(Italy) J Sinner	6	6

Semifinals
3	A Rublev	5	6^{5}
2	(Italy) J Sinner	7	7^{7}

== Qualifying ==
=== Seeds ===
1. (Hungary) Márton Fucsovics (withdrew)
2. (Italy) Lorenzo Sonego (qualifying competition, lucky loser)
3. (Finland) Emil Ruusuvuori (qualifying competition)
4. (Hungary) Fábián Marozsán (qualifying competition, withdrew)
5. (Peru) Juan Pablo Varillas (first round)
6. (Czech Republic) Tomáš Macháč (qualified)
7. (France) Alexandre Müller (qualified)
8. (Spain) Albert Ramos Viñolas (qualified)

=== Qualifiers ===
1. (Austria) Filip Misolic
2. (France) Alexandre Müller
3. (Czech Republic) Tomáš Macháč
4. (Spain) Albert Ramos Viñolas

=== Lucky loser ===
1. (Italy) Lorenzo Sonego

=== Qualifying draw ===
==== First qualifier ====
First round
Alt	(Bosnia and Herzegovina) Damir Džumhur	6^{8}	3
Alt	(Italy) Andrea Vavassori	7^{10}	6
WC	(Austria) Filip Misolic	6	6
5	(Peru) Juan Pablo Varillas	3	2

Qualifying competition
Alt	(Italy) Andrea Vavassori	6	6^{5}	2
WC	(Austria) Filip Misolic	4	7^{7}	6

==== Second qualifier ====
First round
2	(Italy) Lorenzo Sonego	7	6
Alt	(Ukraine) Vitaliy Sachko	5	1
(South Africa) Lloyd Harris	1	4
7	(France) Alexandre Müller	6	6

Qualifying competition
2	(Italy) Lorenzo Sonego	6	3	4
7	(France) Alexandre Müller	1	6	6

==== Third qualifier ====
First round
3	(Finland) Emil Ruusuvuori	6	7
WC	(Austria) Alexander Erler	1	5
(Austria) Jurij Rodionov	3	4
6	(Czech Republic) Tomáš Macháč	6	6

Qualifying competition
3	(Finland) Emil Ruusuvuori	3	3
6	(Czech Republic) Tomáš Macháč	6	6

==== Fourth qualifier ====
First round
4	(Hungary) Fábián Marozsán	6	7^{7}
(Kazakhstan) Timofey Skatov	3	6^{2}
WC	(Croatia) Dino Prižmić	5	6^{3}
8	(Spain) Albert Ramos Viñolas	7	7^{7}

Qualifying competition
4	(Hungary) Fábián Marozsán
8	(Spain) Albert Ramos Viñolas	w/o
