= 2023 Erste Bank Open =

Men's tennis tournament

- Date: 23–29 October
- Edition: 49th
- Category: ATP Tour 500
- Draw: 32S / 16D
- Prize money: €2,409,835
- Surface: Hard (indoor)
- Location: Vienna, Austria
- Venue: Wiener Stadthalle

Champions

Singles
- (Italy) Jannik Sinner

Doubles
- (United States) Rajeev Ram / (United Kingdom) Joe Salisbury
- Vienna Open

The 2023 Erste Bank Open was a men's tennis tournament played on indoor hard courts. It was the 49th edition of the event, and part of the ATP Tour 500 series of the 2023 ATP Tour. It was held at the Wiener Stadthalle in Vienna, Austria, from 23 until 29 October 2023.

== Champions ==
=== Singles ===
- (Italy) Jannik Sinner def. Daniil Medvedev, 7–6^{(9–7)}, 4–6, 6–3
- It was Sinner's 4th title of the year and the 10th of his career.

=== Doubles ===
- (United States) Rajeev Ram / (United Kingdom) Joe Salisbury def. (United States) Nathaniel Lammons / (United States) Jackson Withrow, 6–4, 5–7, [12–10]

== Points and prize money ==
=== Point distribution ===
Event	W	F	SF	QF	Round of 16	Round of 32	Q	Q2	Q1
Singles	500	300	180	90	45	0	20	10	0
Doubles	500	300	180	90		—N/a	—N/a	—N/a	—N/a

=== Prize money ===
Event	W	F	SF	QF	Round of 16	Round of 32	Q2	Q1
Singles	€450,650	€242,480	€129,225	€66,025	€35,245	€18,795	€9,635	€5,405
Doubles*	€148,020	€78,950	€39,940	€19,970	€10,340	—N/a	—N/a	—N/a

_{*per team}

== Singles main-draw entrants ==
=== Seeds ===
Country	Player	Rank^{1}	Seed
	Daniil Medvedev	3	1
ITA	Jannik Sinner	4	2
	Andrey Rublev	5	3
GRE	Stefanos Tsitsipas	7	4
GER	Alexander Zverev	9	5
USA	Tommy Paul	12	6
USA	Frances Tiafoe	14	7
	Karen Khachanov	15	8

- ^{1} Rankings as of 16 October 2023

=== Other entrants ===
The following players received wildcards into the singles main draw:

- (Croatia) Borna Gojo
- (Austria) Sebastian Ofner
- (Austria) Dominic Thiem

The following player received entry into the singles main draw as a special exempt:

- Aslan Karatsev

The following player using a protected ranking into the singles main draw:

- (France) Gaël Monfils

The following players received entry from the qualifying draw:

- (Czech Republic) Tomáš Macháč
- (Austria) Filip Misolic
- (France) Alexandre Müller
- (Spain) Albert Ramos Viñolas

The following player received entry as a lucky loser:

- (Italy) Lorenzo Sonego

=== Withdrawals ===
- (Italy) Matteo Berrettini → replaced by (Germany) Daniel Altmaier
- (Spain) Pablo Carreño Busta → replaced by (Australia) Aleksandar Vukic
- (Croatia) Borna Ćorić → replaced by (Italy) Matteo Arnaldi
- (United States) Mackenzie McDonald → replaced by (Italy) Lorenzo Sonego

== Doubles main draw entrants ==
=== Seeds ===
Country	Player	Country	Player	Rank^{1}	Seed
NED	Wesley Koolhof	GBR	Neal Skupski	7	1
USA	Rajeev Ram	GBR	Joe Salisbury	15	2
ESA	Marcelo Arévalo	NED	Jean-Julien Rojer	33	3
BEL	Sander Gillé	BEL	Joran Vliegen	40	4

- ^{1} Rankings as of 16 October 2023

=== Other entrants ===
The following pairs received wildcards into the doubles main draw:

- (Monaco) Romain Arneodo / (Austria) Sam Weissborn
- (Austria) Sebastian Ofner / (Austria) Philipp Oswald

The following pair received entry from the qualifying draw:

- (Portugal) Francisco Cabral / (United Kingdom) Henry Patten

The following pairs received entry as lucky losers:

- (Ecuador) Gonzalo Escobar / (Kazakhstan) Aleksandr Nedovyesov
- (Austria) Neil Oberleitner / (Austria) Jurij Rodionov

=== Withdrawals ===
- (India) Rohan Bopanna / (Australia) Matthew Ebden → replaced by (France) Sadio Doumbia / (France) Fabien Reboul
- (United Kingdom) Dan Evans / (United States) Ben Shelton → replaced by (Ecuador) Gonzalo Escobar / (Kazakhstan) Aleksandr Nedovyesov
- (United States) Mackenzie McDonald / (Brazil) Marcelo Melo → replaced by (Austria) Neil Oberleitner / (Austria) Jurij Rodionov
