= 2023 Dubai Tennis Championships =

- Date: 19–25 February 2023 (women); 27 February – 4 March 2023 (men)
- Edition: 31st (men) / 23rd (women)
- Category: ATP Tour 500 (men); WTA 1000 (women)
- Draw: 32S / 16D (men); 56S / 28D (women)
- Prize money: $3,020,535 (men) $2,788,468 (women)
- Surface: Hard, Outdoor
- Location: Dubai, United Arab Emirates
- Venue: Aviation Club Tennis Centre

Champions

Men's singles
- Daniil Medvedev

Women's singles
- (Czech Republic) Barbora Krejčíková

Men's doubles
- (United States) Maxime Cressy / (France) Fabrice Martin

Women's doubles
- Veronika Kudermetova / Liudmila Samsonova
- Dubai Tennis Championships

The 2023 Dubai Tennis Championships (also known as the Dubai Duty Free Tennis Championships for sponsorship reasons) was a professional ATP 500 event on the 2023 ATP Tour and a WTA 1000 tournament on the 2023 WTA Tour. Both events were held at the Aviation Club Tennis Centre in Dubai, United Arab Emirates. The women's tournament took place from 19 to 25 February 2023, and the men's tournament from 27 February to 4 March 2023.

== Finals ==
=== Men's singles ===
- Daniil Medvedev def. Andrey Rublev, 6–2, 6–2

=== Women's singles ===
- (Czech Republic) Barbora Krejčíková def. (Poland) Iga Świątek, 6–4, 6–2

=== Men's doubles ===
- (United States) Maxime Cressy / (France) Fabrice Martin def. (United Kingdom) Lloyd Glasspool / (Finland) Harri Heliövaara, 7–6^{(7–2)}, 6–4

=== Women's doubles ===
- Veronika Kudermetova / Liudmila Samsonova def. (Chinese Taipei) Chan Hao-ching / (Chinese Taipei) Latisha Chan, 6–4, 6–7^{(4–7)}, [10–1]

== Points and prize money ==
=== Point distribution ===
Event	W	F	SF	QF	Round of 16	Round of 32	Round of 56	Q	Q2	Q1
Men's singles	500	300	180	90	45	0	—N/a	20	10	0
Men's doubles	500	300	180	90	0	—N/a	—N/a	45	25	0
Women's singles	900	585	350	190	105	60	1	30	20	1
Women's doubles	900	585	350	190	105	1	—N/a	—N/a	—N/a	—N/a

=== Prize money ===
Event	W	F	SF	QF	Round of 16	Round of 32	Round of 56	Q2	Q1
Men's singles	$533,990	$287,320	$153,125	$78,235	$41,765	$22,270	—N/a	$11,415	$6,405
Men's doubles*	$175,400	$93,550	$47,340	$23,660	$12,250	—N/a	—N/a	—N/a	—N/a
Women's singles	$454,500	$267,690	$138,000	$63,350	$31,650	$17,930	$12,848	$7,650	$4,000
Women's doubles*	$148,845	$75,310	$37,275	$18,765	$9,510	$4,695	—N/a	—N/a	—N/a
Doubles prize money per team

== ATP singles main-draw entrants ==
=== Seeds ===
Country	Player	Rank^{1}	Seed
SRB	Novak Djokovic	1	1
	Andrey Rublev	5	2
	Daniil Medvedev	8	3
CAN	Félix Auger-Aliassime	9	4
POL	Hubert Hurkacz	11	5
	Karen Khachanov	14	6
GER	Alexander Zverev	16	7
CRO	Borna Ćorić	20	8

- Rankings are as of February 20, 2023.

=== Other entrants ===
The following players received wildcards into the singles main draw:

- (Tunisia) Malek Jaziri
- (Australia) Thanasi Kokkinakis
- (Australia) Alexei Popyrin

The following players received entry from the qualifying draw:

- Pavel Kotov
- (Bulgaria) Alexandar Lazarov
- (Czech Republic) Tomáš Macháč
- (Australia) Christopher O'Connell

The following players received entry as lucky losers:

- (Italy) Matteo Arnaldi
- (France) Quentin Halys
- (Italy) Francesco Passaro
- Alexander Shevchenko

=== Withdrawals ===
- (Spain) Roberto Bautista Agut → replaced by (France) Quentin Halys
- (France) Benjamin Bonzi → replaced by (Italy) Francesco Passaro
- (Spain) Pablo Carreño Busta → replaced by (Netherlands) Tallon Griekspoor
- (Croatia) Marin Čilić → replaced by (United States) Maxime Cressy
- (United Kingdom) Jack Draper → replaced by (Serbia) Filip Krajinović
- (South Africa) Lloyd Harris → replaced by (Sweden) Mikael Ymer
- (South Korea) Kwon Soon-woo → replaced by (Italy) Matteo Arnaldi
- (United Kingdom) Andy Murray → replaced by Alexander Shevchenko
- (Spain) Rafael Nadal → replaced by (Switzerland) Marc-Andrea Hüsler

== ATP doubles main-draw entrants ==
=== Seeds ===
Country	Player	Country	Player	Rank^{1}	Seed
CRO	Nikola Mektić	CRO	Mate Pavić	15	1
CRO	Ivan Dodig	USA	Austin Krajicek	19	2
GBR	Lloyd Glasspool	FIN	Harri Heliövaara	23	3
MON	Hugo Nys	POL	Jan Zieliński	35	4

- Rankings are as of February 20, 2023.

=== Other entrants ===
The following pairs received wildcards into the doubles main draw:

- (United States) Kareem Al Allaf / (United Arab Emirates) Abdulrahman Al Janahi
- (Pakistan) Aisam-ul-Haq Qureshi / (India) Ramkumar Ramanathan

The following pair received entry from the qualifying draw:

- (Australia) Andrew Harris / (Australia) John-Patrick Smith

The following pairs received entry as lucky losers:

- (India) Yuki Bhambri / (India) Saketh Myneni
- (Belgium) Sander Gillé / (Belgium) Joran Vliegen

=== Withdrawals ===
- (United Kingdom) Dan Evans / (Australia) John Peers → replaced by (Belgium) Sander Gillé / (Belgium) Joran Vliegen
- (France) Constant Lestienne / (Netherlands) Botic van de Zandschulp → replaced by (India) Yuki Bhambri / (India) Saketh Myneni

== WTA singles main-draw entrants ==
=== Seeds ===
Country	Player	Ranking^{1}	Seed
POL	Iga Świątek	1	1
	Aryna Sabalenka	2	2
USA	Jessica Pegula	4	3
FRA	Caroline Garcia	5	4
USA	Coco Gauff	6	5
GRE	Maria Sakkari	7	6
	Daria Kasatkina	8	7
SUI	Belinda Bencic	9	8
KAZ	Elena Rybakina	10	9
	Veronika Kudermetova	11	10
BRA	Beatriz Haddad Maia	12	11
CZE	Petra Kvitová	13	12
LAT	Jeļena Ostapenko	14	13
	Liudmila Samsonova	15	14
	Victoria Azarenka	17	15
	Ekaterina Alexandrova	18	16

- Rankings are as of February 13, 2023.

=== Other entrants ===
The following players received wildcards into the singles main draw:

- (Czech Republic) Linda Fruhvirtová
- (United States) Sofia Kenin
- (Ukraine) Marta Kostyuk
- (Turkey) İpek Öz
- Vera Zvonareva

The following players received entry into the main draw through a protected ranking:

- (Czech Republic) Karolína Muchová
- Anastasia Pavlyuchenkova
- (Czech Republic) Markéta Vondroušová

The following players received entry from the qualifying draw:

- (Romania) Ana Bogdan
- (Austria) Julia Grabher
- (Spain) Rebeka Masarova
- (Italy) Jasmine Paolini
- (Germany) Laura Siegemund
- (Bulgaria) Viktoriya Tomova
- (Ukraine) Dayana Yastremska
- (Ukraine) Katarina Zavatska

The following players received entry into the main draw as lucky losers:

- (United States) Lauren Davis
- (United States) Claire Liu

=== Withdrawals ===
Before the tournament

- Ekaterina Alexandrova → replaced by (United States) Claire Liu
- (Tunisia) Ons Jabeur → replaced by (Kazakhstan) Yulia Putintseva
- (Estonia) Anett Kontaveit → replaced by (United States) Shelby Rogers
- Anastasia Potapova → replaced by (United States) Lauren Davis

During the tournament

- (Kazakhstan) Elena Rybakina (lower back injury)

== WTA doubles main-draw entrants ==
=== Seeds ===
Country	Player	Country	Player	Rank^{1}	Seed
USA	Coco Gauff	USA	Jessica Pegula	6	1
UKR	Lyudmyla Kichenok	LAT	Jeļena Ostapenko	21	2
USA	Desirae Krawczyk	NED	Demi Schuurs	27	3
MEX	Giuliana Olmos	CHN	Zhang Shuai	31	4
USA	Nicole Melichar-Martinez	AUS	Ellen Perez	35	5
KAZ	Anna Danilina	BRA	Luisa Stefani	55	6
CHN	Yang Zhaoxuan		Vera Zvonareva	56	7
BEL	Kirsten Flipkens	GER	Laura Siegemund	57	8

- Rankings are as of February 13, 2023.

=== Other entrants ===
The following pairs received wildcards into the doubles main draw:

- (Romania) Ana Bogdan / Angelina Gabueva
- (United Kingdom) Harriet Dart / (United Kingdom) Eden Silva
- (United States) Sofia Kenin / Ekaterina Yashina

The following pair received entry as alternates:

- (Czech Republic) Linda Fruhvirtová / (Estonia) Kaia Kanepi

=== Withdrawals ===
Before the tournament

- (Czech Republic) Miriam Kolodziejová / (Czech Republic) Markéta Vondroušová → replaced by Ekaterina Alexandrova / (Slovakia) Tereza Mihalíková
- Anastasia Potapova / Yana Sizikova → replaced by (Czech Republic) Linda Fruhvirtová / (Estonia) Kaia Kanepi

During the tournament

- Anastasia Pavlyuchenkova / (Kazakhstan) Elena Rybakina (lower back injury)
