= 2023 ABN AMRO Open – Singles =

Singles
- 2023 ABN AMRO Open

Final
- Champion: Daniil Medvedev
- Runner-up: (Italy) Jannik Sinner
- Score: 5–7, 6–2, 6–2

Details
- Draw: 32 (4 Q / 3 WC )
- Seeds: 8

Events
Singles	Doubles
- ABN AMRO Open

Daniil Medvedev defeated Jannik Sinner in the final, 5–7, 6–2, 6–2 to win the singles tennis title at the 2023 Rotterdam Open.

Félix Auger-Aliassime was the defending champion, but lost in the quarterfinals to Medvedev.

== Seeds ==
1. (Greece) Stefanos Tsitsipas (second round)
2. Andrey Rublev (first round)
3. (Canada) Félix Auger-Aliassime (quarterfinals)
4. (Denmark) Holger Rune (second round, retired)
5. (Poland) Hubert Hurkacz (second round)
6. Daniil Medvedev (champion)
7. (Spain) Pablo Carreño Busta (first round)
8. (Germany) Alexander Zverev (second round)

== Draw ==
Key

- Q = Qualifier
- WC = Wild card
- LL = Lucky loser
- Alt = Alternate
- ITF = ITF entry
- PR = Protected ranking
- SR = Special ranking
- SE = Special exempt
- JE = Junior exempt
- JR = Junior Accelerator Programme entrant
- CO = College Accelerator Programme entrant
- NG = Next Gen Accelerator Program entrant
- w/o = Walkover
- r = Retired
- d = Defaulted

=== Finals ===
Semifinals
(Italy) Jannik Sinner	7	7^{7}
WC	(Netherlands) Tallon Griekspoor	5	6^{5}
6	Daniil Medvedev	6	6
(Bulgaria) Grigor Dimitrov	1	2

Final
(Italy) Jannik Sinner	7	2	2
6	Daniil Medvedev	5	6	6

=== Top half ===
First round
1	(Greece) S Tsitsipas	7	6
(Finland) E Ruusuvuori	5	1
(France) B Bonzi	2	6	1
(Italy) J Sinner	6	3	6
PR	(Switzerland) S Wawrinka	7^{7}	6
(Kazakhstan) A Bublik	6^{5}	4
(France) R Gasquet	2	7^{7}	6
7	(Spain) P Carreño Busta	6	6^{2}	2
4	(Denmark) H Rune	6	6
Q	(France) C Lestienne	4	4
WC	(Netherlands) G Brouwer	6	7
(Switzerland) M-A Hüsler	3	5
Q	(Sweden) M Ymer	6^{7}	5
WC	(Netherlands) T Griekspoor	7^{9}	7
(South Korea) S-w Kwon	4	6^{4}
8	(Germany) A Zverev	6	7^{7}

Second round
1	(Greece) S Tsitsipas	4	3
(Italy) J Sinner	6	6
PR	(Switzerland) S Wawrinka	6	6
(France) R Gasquet	3	3
4	(Denmark) H Rune	4	0^{r}
WC	(Netherlands) G Brouwer	6	4
WC	(Netherlands) T Griekspoor	4	6	6
8	(Germany) A Zverev	6	3	4

Quarterfinals
(Italy) J Sinner	6	6
PR	(Switzerland) S Wawrinka	1	3
WC	(Netherlands) G Brouwer	4	4
WC	(Netherlands) T Griekspoor	6	6

Semifinals
(Italy) J Sinner	7	7^{7}
WC	(Netherlands) T Griekspoor	5	6^{5}

=== Bottom half ===
First round
6	D Medvedev	4	6	6
(Spain) A Davidovich Fokina	6	2	2
(Netherlands) B van de Zandschulp	5	6	7^{7}
LL	(France) Q Halys	7	4	6^{4}
(Belgium) D Goffin	0	6^{3}
Q	(France) G Barrère	6	7^{7}
(Italy) L Sonego	2	3
3	(Canada) F Auger-Aliassime	6	6
5	(Poland) H Hurkacz	7	6^{7}	7^{7}
(Spain) R Bautista Agut	5	7^{9}	6^{4}
(Bulgaria) G Dimitrov	6	6
Q	A Karatsev	1	3
WC	(Netherlands) T van Rijthoven	3	7^{7}	3
(United States) M Cressy	6	6^{2}	6
(Australia) A de Minaur	6	6
2	A Rublev	4	4

Second round
6	D Medvedev	6	6
(Netherlands) B van de Zandschulp	2	2
Q	(France) G Barrère	4	3
3	(Canada) F Auger-Aliassime	6	6
5	(Poland) H Hurkacz	6^{4}	6^{5}
(Bulgaria) G Dimitrov	7^{7}	7^{7}
(United States) M Cressy	5	6	3
(Australia) A de Minaur	7	3	6

Quarterfinals
6	D Medvedev	6	6
3	(Canada) F Auger-Aliassime	2	4
(Bulgaria) G Dimitrov	6	3	7^{8}
(Australia) A de Minaur	3	6	6^{6}

Semifinals
6	D Medvedev	6	6
(Bulgaria) G Dimitrov	1	2

== Qualifying ==
=== Seeds ===
1. (France) Constant Lestienne (qualified)
2. (France) Arthur Rinderknech (first round)
3. (France) Quentin Halys (qualifying competition, lucky loser)
4. (Sweden) Mikael Ymer (qualified)
5. (France) Grégoire Barrère (qualified)
6. Roman Safiullin (qualifying competition)
7. (Georgia (country)) Nikoloz Basilashvili (qualifying competition)
8. Aslan Karatsev (qualified)

=== Qualifiers ===
1. (France) Constant Lestienne
2. Aslan Karatsev
3. (France) Grégoire Barrère
4. (Sweden) Mikael Ymer

=== Lucky loser ===
1. (France) Quentin Halys

=== Qualifying draw ===
==== First qualifier ====
First round
1	(France) Constant Lestienne	7^{7}	7^{7}
Alt	(Germany) Maximilian Marterer	6^{5}	6^{4}
WC	(Netherlands) Max Houkes	4	4
7	(Georgia (country)) Nikoloz Basilashvili	6	6

Qualifying competition
1	(France) Constant Lestienne	7	6
7	(Georgia (country)) Nikoloz Basilashvili	5	4

==== Second qualifier ====
First round
2	(France) Arthur Rinderknech	6^{3}	1
(Austria) Jurij Rodionov	7^{7}	6
WC	(Netherlands) Sidané Pontjodikromo	4	3
8	Aslan Karatsev	6	6

Qualifying competition
(Austria) Jurij Rodionov	5	5
8	Aslan Karatsev	7	7

==== Third qualifier ====
First round
3	(France) Quentin Halys	6	6
(Belgium) Zizou Bergs	3	2
WC	(Netherlands) Jesper de Jong	5	2
5	(France) Grégoire Barrère	7	6

Qualifying competition
3	(France) Quentin Halys	7^{7}	6^{3}	6^{1}
5	(France) Grégoire Barrère	6^{4}	7^{7}	7^{7}

==== Fourth qualifier ====
First round
4	(Sweden) Mikael Ymer	7	7
(Croatia) Borna Gojo	5	5
(Sweden) Elias Ymer	6	2	4
6	Roman Safiullin	3	6	6

Qualifying competition
4	(Sweden) Mikael Ymer	2	6	6
6	Roman Safiullin	6	3	4
