= 2019 Surbiton Trophy – Women's singles =

Women's singles
- 2019 Surbiton Trophy

Final
- Champion: (United States) Alison Riske
- Runner-up: (Slovakia) Magdaléna Rybáriková
- Score: 6–7^{(5–7)}, 6–2, 6–2

Events
Singles	men	women
Doubles	men	women
← 2018 ·	Surbiton Trophy	· 2022 →

Alison Riske was the defending champion. Riske successfully defended the title, by beating 2017 champion Magdaléna Rybáriková 6–7^{(5–7)}, 6–2, 6–2 in the final.

== Seeds ==
1. (Belgium) Alison Van Uytvanck (quarterfinals)
2. (Germany) Tatjana Maria (semifinals)
3. (United States) Alison Riske (champion)
4. (Russia) Evgeniya Rodina (first round)
5. (Slovakia) Magdaléna Rybáriková (final)
6. (Switzerland) Viktorija Golubic (second round)
7. (United States) Jennifer Brady (first round)
8. (Russia) Vitalia Diatchenko (first round)

== Draw ==
Key

- Q = Qualifier
- WC = Wild card
- LL = Lucky loser
- Alt = Alternate
- ITF = ITF entry
- PR = Protected ranking
- SR = Special ranking
- SE = Special exempt
- JE = Junior exempt
- JR = Junior Accelerator Programme entrant
- CO = College Accelerator Programme entrant
- NG = Next Gen Accelerator Program entrant
- w/o = Walkover
- r = Retired
- d = Defaulted

=== Finals ===
Semifinals
Q	(United States) Caty McNally	0	4
3	(United States) Alison Riske	6	6
5	(Slovakia) Magdaléna Rybáriková	6	6
2	(Germany) Tatjana Maria	4	2

Final
3	(United States) Alison Riske	6^{5}	6	6
5	(Slovakia) Magdaléna Rybáriková	7^{7}	2	2

=== Top half ===
First round
1	(Belgium) A Van Uytvanck	6	6
Q	(Australia) L Cabrera	1	4
Q	(United States) C Dolehide	6	6
(Australia) P Hon	2	1
(Russia) N Vikhlyantseva	6	5	5
(China) L Zhu	1	7	7
Q	(United States) C McNally	6	6
7	(United States) J Brady	4	3
3	(United States) A Riske	6	6
Q	(United States) A Li	2	4
WC	(United Kingdom) N Bains	2	6^{4}
(Belgium) G Minnen	6	7^{7}
WC	(United Kingdom) K Dunne	6	6
Q	(India) A Raina	3	3
(Czech Republic) T Smitková	6	6
8	(Russia) V Diatchenko	4	3

Second round
1	(Belgium) A Van Uytvanck	6	3	6
Q	(United States) C Dolehide	4	6	4
(China) L Zhu	2	2
Q	(United States) C McNally	6	6
3	(United States) A Riske	6	6
(Belgium) G Minnen	4	2
WC	(United Kingdom) K Dunne	6	6
(Czech Republic) T Smitková	4	4

Quarterfinals
1	(Belgium) A Van Uytvanck	6^{5}	2
Q	(United States) C McNally	7^{7}	6
3	(United States) A Riske	6^{7}	6	6
WC	(United Kingdom) K Dunne	7^{9}	4	1

Semifinals
Q	(United States) C McNally	0	4
3	(United States) A Riske	6	6

=== Bottom half ===
First round
5	(Slovakia) M Rybáriková	6	6
(Chinese Taipei) E-s Liang	3	1
(Serbia) I Jorović	4	1
Q	(Russia) A Kalinskaya	6	6
(United States) M Brengle	6	6
WC	(United Kingdom) M Lumsden	1	3
(United Kingdom) H Watson	6	6
4	(Russia) E Rodina	4	1
6	(Switzerland) V Golubic	6	2	6
(Russia) A Blinkova	3	6	2
(Belgium) Y Wickmayer	6	3	6
(United States) S Vickery	4	6	4
WC	(United Kingdom) JA Burrage	5	7^{10}	6^{6}
(Belarus) V Lapko	7	6^{8}	7^{8}
(Kazakhstan) Z Diyas	3	6	3
2	(Germany) T Maria	6	3	6

Second round
5	(Slovakia) M Rybáriková	6	4	6
Q	(Russia) A Kalinskaya	2	6	2
(United States) M Brengle	4	2
(United Kingdom) H Watson	6	6
6	(Switzerland) V Golubic	1	6^{5}
(Belgium) Y Wickmayer	6	7^{7}
(Belarus) V Lapko	1	4
2	(Germany) T Maria	6	6

Quarterfinals
5	(Slovakia) M Rybáriková	6	6
(United Kingdom) H Watson	4	4
(Belgium) Y Wickmayer	4	6	3
2	(Germany) T Maria	6	3	6

Semifinals
5	(Slovakia) M Rybáriková	6	6
2	(Germany) T Maria	4	2
