= 2022 Surbiton Trophy – Women's singles =

Women's singles
- 2022 Surbiton Trophy

Final
- Champion: (Belgium) Alison Van Uytvanck
- Runner-up: (Australia) Arina Rodionova
- Score: 7–6^{(7–3)}, 6–2

Events
Singles	men	women
Doubles	men	women
← 2019 ·	Surbiton Trophy	· 2023 →

Alison Riske was the defending champion but chose not to participate.

Alison Van Uytvanck won the title, defeating Arina Rodionova in the final, 7–6^{(7–3)}, 6–2.

== Seeds ==
1. (United States) Madison Brengle (quarterfinals, retired)
2. (Belgium) Alison Van Uytvanck (champion)
3. (China) Zhu Lin (first round)
4. (Germany) Tatjana Maria (quarterfinals)
5. (United Kingdom) Harriet Dart (first round)
6. (Romania) Mihaela Buzărnescu (quarterfinals, retired)
7. (United States) CoCo Vandeweghe (semifinals)
8. (China) Wang Qiang (second round)

== Draw ==
Key

- Q = Qualifier
- WC = Wild card
- LL = Lucky loser
- Alt = Alternate
- ITF = ITF entry
- PR = Protected ranking
- SR = Special ranking
- SE = Special exempt
- JE = Junior exempt
- JR = Junior Accelerator Programme entrant
- CO = College Accelerator Programme entrant
- NG = Next Gen Accelerator Program entrant
- w/o = Walkover
- r = Retired
- d = Defaulted

=== Finals ===
Semifinals
(Australia) Arina Rodionova	6	6
7	(United States) CoCo Vandeweghe	4	1
WC	(United Kingdom) Jodie Burrage	3	4
2	(Belgium) Alison Van Uytvanck	6	6

Final
(Australia) Arina Rodionova	6^{3}	2
2	(Belgium) Alison Van Uytvanck	7^{7}	6

=== Top half ===
First round
1	(United States) M Brengle	7^{7}	6
(Mexico) F Contreras	6^{4}	1
WC	(United Kingdom) Y Miyazaki	3	4
WC	(United Kingdom) S Kartal	6	6
Q	(Poland) U Radwańska	0	2
(Australia) Ar Rodionova	6	6
(Italy) L Stefanini	1	2
8	(China) Q Wang	6	6
4	(Germany) T Maria	7	6
WC	(United Kingdom) SB Grey	5	2
Q	(Switzerland) L Sun	6	6
(United States) K Volynets	4	4
(Spain) C Bucșa	6	6
(Australia) L Cabrera	4	2
Q	(United Kingdom) E Silva	6	2	4
7	(United States) C Vandeweghe	3	6	6

Second round
1	(United States) M Brengle	6	6
WC	(United Kingdom) S Kartal	3	4
(Australia) Ar Rodionova	6	6
8	(China) Q Wang	3	4
4	(Germany) T Maria	6	5	7^{7}
Q	(Switzerland) L Sun	2	7	6^{5}
(Spain) C Bucșa	3	1
7	(United States) C Vandeweghe	6	6

Quarterfinals
1	(United States) M Brengle	3	7	1^{r}
(Australia) Ar Rodionova	6	5	2
4	(Germany) T Maria	7^{7}	3	1
7	(United States) C Vandeweghe	6^{5}	6	6

Semifinals
(Australia) Ar Rodionova	6	6
7	(United States) C Vandeweghe	4	1

=== Bottom half ===
First round
6	(Romania) M Buzărnescu	6	6
PR	(Belgium) Y Wickmayer	3	3
(Georgia (country)) M Bolkvadze	6	6
Q	(United Kingdom) I Lacy	3	2
(Ukraine) K Baindl	6	0	7^{7}
Q	(Germany) S Lisicki	2	6	6^{4}
WC	(United Kingdom) J Burrage	7^{7}	6
3	(China) L Zhu	6^{5}	3
5	(United Kingdom) H Dart	6	6^{5}	5
Q	(Serbia) N Stevanović	2	7^{7}	7
Q	(Australia) A Parnaby	3	0
(Australia) O Gadecki	6	6
(United States) A Parks	6	6
Q	(Croatia) J Fett	3	4
(Netherlands) L Pattinama Kerkhove	3	4
2	(Belgium) A Van Uytvanck	6	6

Second round
6	(Romania) M Buzărnescu	7	6
(Georgia (country)) M Bolkvadze	5	0
(Ukraine) K Baindl	4	4
WC	(United Kingdom) J Burrage	6	6
Q	(Serbia) N Stevanović	6	6
(Australia) O Gadecki	0	2
(United States) A Parks	6	5	5
2	(Belgium) A Van Uytvanck	2	7	7

Quarterfinals
6	(Romania) M Buzărnescu	6	1^{r}
WC	(United Kingdom) J Burrage	3	2
Q	(Serbia) N Stevanović	0	3
2	(Belgium) A Van Uytvanck	6	6

Semifinals
WC	(United Kingdom) J Burrage	3	4
2	(Belgium) A Van Uytvanck	6	6
