= 2019 Surbiton Trophy – Men's doubles =

Men's doubles
- 2019 Surbiton Trophy

Final
- Champions: (Spain) Marcel Granollers (Japan) Ben McLachlan
- Runners-up: (South Korea) Kwon Soon-woo (India) Ramkumar Ramanathan
- Score: 4–6, 6–3, [10–2]

Events
Singles	men	women
Doubles	men	women
← 2018 ·	Surbiton Trophy	· 2022 →

Luke Bambridge and Jonny O'Mara were the defending champions but only Bambridge chose to defend his title, partnering Marcus Daniell. Bambridge lost in the semifinals to Marcel Granollers and Ben McLachlan.

Granollers and McLachlan won the title after defeating Kwon Soon-woo and Ramkumar Ramanathan 4–6, 6–3, [10–2] in the final.

== Seeds ==
1. (Spain) Marcel Granollers / (Japan) Ben McLachlan (champions)
2. (Brazil) Marcelo Demoliner / (India) Divij Sharan (first round)
3. (United Kingdom) Luke Bambridge / (New Zealand) Marcus Daniell (semifinals)
4. (Israel) Jonathan Erlich / (New Zealand) Artem Sitak (quarterfinals)

== Draw ==
=== Key ===
- Q = Qualifier
- WC = Wild card
- LL = Lucky loser
- Alt = Alternate
- SE = Special exempt
- PR = Protected ranking
- ITF = ITF entry
- JE = Junior exempt
- w/o = Walkover
- r = Retired
- d = Defaulted
- SR = Special ranking

First round
1	(Spain) M Granollers (Japan) B McLachlan	6	6
(India) S Balaji (United States) J Cerretani	3	1
(Australia) A de Minaur (Australia) M Reid	3	6	[8]
WC	(United Kingdom) L Broady (United Kingdom) S Clayton	6	4	[10]
3	(United Kingdom) L Bambridge (New Zealand) M Daniell	7^{10}	6
(Canada) P Polansky (Canada) B Schnur	6^{8}	3
(United States) JC Aragone (United States) D Kudla	6^{4}	6^{3}
(Australia) L Saville (Australia) J-P Smith	7^{7}	7^{7}
(India) J Nedunchezhiyan (India) P Raja	4	3
(South Korea) S-w Kwon (India) R Ramanathan	6	6
WC	(Australia) L Hewitt (Australia) J Thompson	3	6^{4}
4	(Israel) J Erlich (New Zealand) A Sitak	6	7^{7}
(Germany) D Köpfer (United States) T Paul	3	7^{7}	[6]
(Australia) T Kokkinakis (Australia) N Kyrgios	6	6^{4}	[10]
WC	(United Kingdom) D Evans (United Kingdom) L Glasspool	7	6^{5}	[10]
2	(Brazil) M Demoliner (India) D Sharan	5	7^{7}	[8]

Quarterfinals
1	(Spain) M Granollers (Japan) B McLachlan	6	6
WC	(United Kingdom) L Broady (United Kingdom) S Clayton	3	4
3	(United Kingdom) L Bambridge (New Zealand) M Daniell	1	7^{7}	[13]
(Australia) L Saville (Australia) J-P Smith	6	6^{4}	[11]
(South Korea) S-w Kwon (India) R Ramanathan	6	7^{7}
4	(Israel) J Erlich (New Zealand) A Sitak	2	6^{5}
(Australia) T Kokkinakis (Australia) N Kyrgios	7^{7}	4	[4]
WC	(United Kingdom) D Evans (United Kingdom) L Glasspool	6^{5}	6	[10]

Semifinals
1	(Spain) M Granollers (Japan) B McLachlan	6	7^{7}
3	(United Kingdom) L Bambridge (New Zealand) M Daniell	4	6^{3}
(South Korea) S-w Kwon (India) R Ramanathan	6	6^{3}	[10]
WC	(United Kingdom) D Evans (United Kingdom) L Glasspool	4	7^{7}	[4]

Final
1	(Spain) M Granollers (Japan) B McLachlan	4	6	[10]
(South Korea) S-w Kwon (India) R Ramanathan	6	3	[2]
