= 2019 Surbiton Trophy – Men's singles =

Men's singles
- 2019 Surbiton Trophy

Final
- Champion: (United Kingdom) Dan Evans
- Runner-up: (Serbia) Viktor Troicki
- Score: 6–2, 6–3

Events
| Singles | men | women |
| Doubles | men | women |
| ← 2018 · | Surbiton Trophy | · 2022 → |

Jérémy Chardy was the defending champion but chose not to defend his title.

Dan Evans won the title after defeating Viktor Troicki 6–2, 6–3 in the final.

== Seeds ==
All seeds receive a bye into the second round.

1. (France) Ugo Humbert (second round)
2. (Australia) Matthew Ebden (quarterfinals)
3. (Australia) Jordan Thompson (withdrew)
4. (United Kingdom) Dan Evans (champion)
5. (United States) Denis Kudla (semifinals)
6. (Romania) Marius Copil (semifinals)
7. (Australia) Bernard Tomic (third round)
8. (Croatia) Ivo Karlović (quarterfinals)
9. (Canada) Brayden Schnur (third round)
10. (Spain) Marcel Granollers (quarterfinals)
11. (Spain) Feliciano López (third round)
12. (Ukraine) Sergiy Stakhovsky (second round)
13. (Germany) Peter Gojowczyk (second round)
14. (Canada) Peter Polansky (third round)
15. (Germany) Matthias Bachinger (quarterfinals)
16. (Australia) Alex Bolt (third round)

== Draw ==
=== Key ===
- Q = Qualifier
- WC = Wild card
- LL = Lucky loser
- Alt = Alternate
- SE = Special exempt
- PR = Protected ranking
- ITF = ITF entry
- JE = Junior exempt
- w/o = Walkover
- r = Retired
- d = Defaulted
- SR = Special ranking

=== Finals ===
Quarterfinals
(Serbia) Viktor Troicki | 6 | 5 | 7^{7}
8 | (Croatia) Ivo Karlović | 2 | 7 | 6^{4}
15 | (Germany) Matthias Bachinger | 6^{4} | 5
5 | (United States) Denis Kudla | 7^{7} | 7
10 | (Spain) Marcel Granollers | 4 | 2
4 | (United Kingdom) Dan Evans | 6 | 6
6 | (Romania) Marius Copil | 6 | 6
2 | (Australia) Matthew Ebden | 3 | 2

Semifinals
(Serbia) Viktor Troicki | 3 | 7^{7} | 7
5 | (United States) Denis Kudla | 6 | 6^{5} | 5
4 | (United Kingdom) Dan Evans | 7^{7} | 6^{4} | 6
6 | (Romania) Marius Copil | 6^{3} | 7^{7} | 4

Final
(Serbia) Viktor Troicki | 2 | 3
4 | (United Kingdom) Dan Evans | 6 | 6

=== Top half ===
==== Section 1 ====
First round
(Austria) J Rodionov | 7^{7} | 3 | 2
(Serbia) V Troicki | 6^{3} | 6 | 6
Q | (United Kingdom) Andrew Watson | 2 | 2
(South Korea) Y-s Chung | 6 | 6
WC | (United Kingdom) R Peniston | 3 | 6 | 3
(Germany) D Brands | 6 | 3 | 6
WC | (United Kingdom) E Hoyt | 4 | 3
(Japan) Y Sugita | 6 | 6

Second round
1 | (France) U Humbert | 7^{7} | 0 | 3
(Serbia) V Troicki | 6^{5} | 6 | 6
(South Korea) Y-s Chung | 3 | 3
14 | (Canada) P Polansky | 6 | 6
11 | (Spain) F López | 5 | 6 | 6
(Germany) D Brands | 7 | 3 | 4
(Japan) Y Sugita | 6^{2} | 7^{7} | 3
8 | (Croatia) I Karlović | 7^{7} | 6^{5} | 6

Third round
(Serbia) V Troicki | 7^{7} | 6
14 | (Canada) P Polansky | 6^{2} | 2
11 | (Spain) F López | 6 | 6^{5} | 6^{4}
8 | (Croatia) I Karlović | 1 | 7^{7} | 7^{7}

Quarterfinals
(Serbia) V Troicki | 6 | 5 | 7^{7}
8 | (Croatia) I Karlović | 2 | 7 | 6^{4}

==== Section 2 ====
First round
(South Korea) S-w Kwon | 6 | 6
(United States) JC Aragone | 4 | 1
(India) R Ramanathan | 6 | 3 | 6
(Germany) T Kamke | 3 | 6 | 1
WC | (United Kingdom) P Jubb | 5 | 6 | 3
(United Kingdom) J Ward | 7 | 4 | 6
(Australia) J Kubler | 4 | 6 | 6
WC | (United Kingdom) L Broady | 6 | 2 | 0

Second round
LL | (United Kingdom) A Gray | 2 | 5
(South Korea) S-w Kwon | 6 | 7
(India) R Ramanathan | 6 | 4 | 3
15 | (Germany) M Bachinger | 4 | 6 | 6
12 | (Ukraine) S Stakhovsky | 7^{7} | 3 | 4
(United Kingdom) J Ward | 6^{4} | 6 | 6
(Australia) J Kubler | 2 | 3
5 | (United States) D Kudla | 6 | 6

Third round
(South Korea) S-w Kwon | 6 | 6^{5} | 6^{4}
15 | (Germany) M Bachinger | 2 | 7^{7} | 7^{7}
(United Kingdom) J Ward | 3 | 6 | 3
5 | (United States) D Kudla | 6 | 4 | 6

Quarterfinals
15 | (Germany) M Bachinger | 6^{4} | 5
5 | (United States) D Kudla | 7^{7} | 7

=== Bottom half ===
==== Section 3 ====
First round
(Slovakia) F Horanský | 4 | 7^{7} | 4
(United States) T Paul | 6 | 6^{1} | 6
WC | (United Kingdom) L Glasspool | 4 | 6^{2}
(Germany) D Köpfer | 6 | 7^{7}
Q | (Australia) L Saville | 4 | 3
(Turkey) C İlkel | 6 | 6
(Australia) J-P Smith | 4 | 6 | 6^{7}
(Belgium) R Bemelmans | 6 | 3 | 7^{9}

Second round
7 | (Australia) B Tomic | 6 | 3 | 6
(United States) T Paul | 4 | 6 | 3
(Germany) D Köpfer | 2 | 6^{2}
10 | (Spain) M Granollers | 6 | 7^{7}
16 | (Australia) A Bolt | 7^{7} | 6
(Turkey) C İlkel | 6^{4} | 1
(Belgium) R Bemelmans | 4 | 4
4 | (United Kingdom) D Evans | 6 | 6

Third round
7 | (Australia) B Tomic | 6^{12} | 3
10 | (Spain) M Granollers | 7^{14} | 6
16 | (Australia) A Bolt | 7 | 2 | 0
4 | (United Kingdom) D Evans | 5 | 6 | 6

Quarterfinals
10 | (Spain) M Granollers | 4 | 2
4 | (United Kingdom) D Evans | 6 | 6

==== Section 4 ====
First round
(Japan) H Moriya | 6^{5} | 4
(Bosnia and Herzegovina) M Bašić | 7^{7} | 6
(Australia) A Harris | 6 | 3 | 4
LL | (United Kingdom) B Klein | 2 | 6 | 6
(Germany) D Brown | 3 | 2
(Slovakia) L Lacko | 6 | 6
(United Kingdom) J Clarke | 5 | 7^{7} | 3
(Russia) E Donskoy | 7 | 6^{5} | 6

Second round
6 | (Romania) M Copil | 6 | 7
(Bosnia and Herzegovina) M Bašić | 2 | 5
LL | (United Kingdom) B Klein | 3 | 3
9 | (Canada) B Schnur | 6 | 6
13 | (Germany) P Gojowczyk | 6^{7} | 6^{4}
(Slovakia) L Lacko | 7^{9} | 7^{7}
(Russia) E Donskoy | 2 | 0
2 | (Australia) M Ebden | 6 | 6

Third round
6 | (Romania) M Copil | 6 | 6
9 | (Canada) B Schnur | 3 | 3
(Slovakia) L Lacko | 5 | 6^{4}
2 | (Australia) M Ebden | 7 | 7^{7}

Quarterfinals
6 | (Romania) M Copil | 6 | 6
2 | (Australia) M Ebden | 3 | 2
