= 2022 Surbiton Trophy – Women's doubles =

Women's doubles
- 2022 Surbiton Trophy

Final
- Champions: (United States) Ingrid Neel (Netherlands) Rosalie van der Hoek
- Runners-up: (Mexico) Fernanda Contreras (United States) Catherine Harrison
- Score: 6–3, 6–3

Events
Singles	men	women
Doubles	men	women
← 2019 ·	Surbiton Trophy	· 2023 →

Jennifer Brady and Caroline Dolehide were the defending champions but chose not to participate.

Ingrid Neel and Rosalie van der Hoek won the title, defeating Fernanda Contreras and Catherine Harrison in the final, 6–3, 6–3.

== Seeds ==
1. (United Kingdom) Alicia Barnett / (United Kingdom) Samantha Murray Sharan (semifinals)
2. (Mexico) Fernanda Contreras / (United States) Catherine Harrison (final)
3. (United States) Ingrid Neel / (Netherlands) Rosalie van der Hoek (champion)
4. (Georgia (country)) Mariam Bolkvadze / (France) Estelle Cascino (first round)

== Draw ==
Key

- Q = Qualifier
- WC = Wild card
- LL = Lucky loser
- Alt = Alternate
- ITF = ITF entry
- PR = Protected ranking
- SR = Special ranking
- SE = Special exempt
- JE = Junior exempt
- JR = Junior Accelerator Programme entrant
- CO = College Accelerator Programme entrant
- NG = Next Gen Accelerator Program entrant
- w/o = Walkover
- r = Retired
- d = Defaulted

=== Draw ===
First round
1	(United Kingdom) A Barnett (United Kingdom) S Murray Sharan	6	7^{7}
(United States) A Parks (Australia) A Parnaby	4	6^{3}
WC	(United Kingdom) D Daley (United Kingdom) E Maloney	1	2
WC	(United Kingdom) N Bains (United Kingdom) F Christie	6	6
3	(United States) I Neel (Netherlands) R van der Hoek	3	6	[10]
(Brazil) I Gamarra Martins (United Kingdom) E Webley-Smith	6	4	[5]
(United Kingdom) H Dart (China) Q Wang	5	6	[10]
WC	(United Kingdom) E Appleton (United Kingdom) A Collins	7	4	[8]
(United Kingdom) SB Grey (United Kingdom) Y Miyazaki	6	6
(United States) K Volynets (Mexico) M Zacarías	4	4
(United Kingdom) J Burrage (United Kingdom) E Silva	6	6
4	(Georgia (country)) M Bolkvadze (France) E Cascino	0	3
(Spain) C Bucșa (Australia) A Osborne	w/o
(Australia) O Gadecki (Serbia) N Stevanović
Alt	(United Kingdom) F Davis (United Kingdom) J Matthews	1	5
2	(Mexico) F Contreras (United States) C Harrison	6	7

Quarterfinals
1	(United Kingdom) A Barnett (United Kingdom) S Murray Sharan	7	6
WC	(United Kingdom) N Bains (United Kingdom) F Christie	5	2
3	(United States) I Neel (Netherlands) R van der Hoek	6	3	[10]
(United Kingdom) H Dart (China) Q Wang	4	6	[6]
(United Kingdom) SB Grey (United Kingdom) Y Miyazaki
(United Kingdom) J Burrage (United Kingdom) E Silva	w/o
(Spain) C Bucșa (Australia) A Osborne
2	(Mexico) F Contreras (United States) C Harrison	w/o

Semifinals
1	(United Kingdom) A Barnett (United Kingdom) S Murray Sharan	6	2	[4]
3	(United States) I Neel (Netherlands) R van der Hoek	4	6	[10]
(United Kingdom) J Burrage (United Kingdom) E Silva
2	(Mexico) F Contreras (United States) C Harrison	w/o

Final
3	(United States) I Neel (Netherlands) R van der Hoek	6	6
2	(Mexico) F Contreras (United States) C Harrison	3	3
