= 2018 Fuzion 100 Surbiton Trophy – Women's doubles =

Women's doubles
- 2018 Fuzion 100 Surbiton Trophy

Final
- Champions: (Australia) Jessica Moore (Australia) Ellen Perez
- Runners-up: (Australia) Arina Rodionova (Belgium) Yanina Wickmayer
- Score: 4–6, 7–5, [10–3]

Events
Singles	men	women
Doubles	men	women
← 2017 ·	Surbiton Trophy	· 2019 →

Monique Adamczak and Storm Sanders were the defending champions, but Sanders chose not to participate. Adamczak partnered Laura Robson but lost in the semifinals to Jessica Moore and Ellen Perez.

Moore and Perez won the title, defeating Arina Rodionova and Yanina Wickmayer in the final, 4–6, 7–5, [10–3].

== Seeds ==
1. (Australia) Monique Adamczak / (United Kingdom) Laura Robson (semifinals)
2. (Australia) Priscilla Hon / (Hungary) Fanny Stollár (semifinals)
3. (Australia) Jessica Moore / (Australia) Ellen Perez (champions)
4. (United States) Desirae Krawczyk / (Mexico) Giuliana Olmos (first round)

== Draw ==
Key

- Q = Qualifier
- WC = Wild card
- LL = Lucky loser
- Alt = Alternate
- ITF = ITF entry
- PR = Protected ranking
- SR = Special ranking
- SE = Special exempt
- JE = Junior exempt
- JR = Junior Accelerator Programme entrant
- CO = College Accelerator Programme entrant
- NG = Next Gen Accelerator Program entrant
- w/o = Walkover
- r = Retired
- d = Defaulted

=== Draw ===
First round
1	(Australia) M Adamczak (United Kingdom) L Robson	1	6	[10]
WC	(United Kingdom) SB Grey (United Kingdom) O Nicholls	6	3	[8]
(United States) A Muhammad (United States) I Neel	6^{7}	7^{7}	[10]
(United States) J Loeb (Belgium) A-S Mestach	7^{9}	6^{5}	[3]
3	(Australia) J Moore (Australia) E Perez	3	6	[10]
(Australia) L Cabrera (Papua New Guinea) A Tere-Apisah	6	2	[8]
(United Kingdom) T Moore (Switzerland) C Perrin	7^{7}	6^{6}	[10]
Alt	(India) A Raina (United Kingdom) E Webley-Smith	6^{3}	7^{8}	[2]
(United States) S Chang (United States) A Mueller	3	6	[10]
WC	(United Kingdom) E Appleton (United Kingdom) S Murray	6	4	[8]
(Australia) Ar Rodionova (Belgium) Y Wickmayer	6	6
4	(United States) D Krawczyk (Mexico) G Olmos	4	1
(United Kingdom) H Dart (United Kingdom) K Dunne	6	6
(United States) M Brengle (Russia) V Savinykh	3	2
(United States) E Bektas (United States) M Sanchez	3	3
2	(Australia) P Hon (Hungary) F Stollár	6	6

Quarterfinals
1	(Australia) M Adamczak (United Kingdom) L Robson	6	7^{7}
(United States) A Muhammad (United States) I Neel	2	6^{4}
3	(Australia) J Moore (Australia) E Perez	7^{7}	7
(United Kingdom) T Moore (Switzerland) C Perrin	6^{0}	5
(United States) S Chang (United States) A Mueller	7	4	[3]
(Australia) Ar Rodionova (Belgium) Y Wickmayer	5	6	[10]
(United Kingdom) H Dart (United Kingdom) K Dunne	3	7^{7}	[6]
2	(Australia) P Hon (Hungary) F Stollár	6	6^{4}	[10]

Semifinals
1	(Australia) M Adamczak (United Kingdom) L Robson	4	4
3	(Australia) J Moore (Australia) E Perez	6	6
(Australia) Ar Rodionova (Belgium) Y Wickmayer	6	6^{2}	[10]
2	(Australia) P Hon (Hungary) F Stollár	4	7^{7}	[7]

Final
3	(Australia) J Moore (Australia) E Perez	4	7	[10]
(Australia) Ar Rodionova (Belgium) Y Wickmayer	6	5	[3]
