= 2018 Fuzion 100 Surbiton Trophy – Men's doubles =

Men's doubles
- 2018 Fuzion 100 Surbiton Trophy

Final
- Champions: (United Kingdom) Luke Bambridge (United Kingdom) Jonny O'Mara
- Runners-up: (United Kingdom) Ken Skupski (United Kingdom) Neal Skupski
- Score: 7–6^{(13–11)}, 4–6, [10–7]

Events
Singles	men	women
Doubles	men	women
← 2017 ·	Fuzion 100 Surbiton Trophy	· 2019 →

Marcus Daniell and Aisam-ul-Haq Qureshi were the defending champions but only Qureshi chose to defend his title, partnering Divij Sharan. Qureshi lost in the quarterfinals to Alex Bolt and Lleyton Hewitt.

Luke Bambridge and Jonny O'Mara won the title after defeating Ken and Neal Skupski 7–6^{(13–11)}, 4–6, [10–7] in the final.

== Seeds ==
1. (Pakistan) Aisam-ul-Haq Qureshi / (India) Divij Sharan (quarterfinals)
2. (United States) Nicholas Monroe / (Australia) John-Patrick Smith (semifinals)
3. (France) Fabrice Martin / (India) Purav Raja (first round)
4. (United Kingdom) Ken Skupski / (United Kingdom) Neal Skupski (final)

== Draw ==
Key

- Q = Qualifier
- WC = Wild card
- LL = Lucky loser
- Alt = Alternate
- ITF = ITF entry
- PR = Protected ranking
- SR = Special ranking
- SE = Special exempt
- JE = Junior exempt
- JR = Junior Accelerator Programme entrant
- CO = College Accelerator Programme entrant
- NG = Next Gen Accelerator Program entrant
- w/o = Walkover
- r = Retired
- d = Defaulted

First round
1	(Pakistan) A-u-H Qureshi (India) D Sharan	6	7^{7}
(Australia) A de Minaur (Australia) M Reid	4	6^{4}
WC	(Australia) A Bolt (Australia) L Hewitt	4	7	[10]
WC	(United Kingdom) J Clarke (United Kingdom) M Willis	6	5	[6]
4	(United Kingdom) K Skupski (United Kingdom) N Skupski	2	7^{7}	[10]
(France) H Nys (Germany) P Petzschner	6	6^{2}	[5]
(India) S Balaji (India) V Vardhan	7^{7}	3	[10]
(Australia) N Kyrgios (United States) J Withrow	6^{2}	6	[6]
(United Kingdom) L Bambridge (United Kingdom) J O'Mara	3	7^{7}	[10]
WC	(United Kingdom) L Broady (United Kingdom) S Clayton	6	6^{2}	[4]
(United Kingdom) J Salisbury (Canada) A Shamasdin	7^{7}	6^{4}	[10]
3	(France) F Martin (India) P Raja	6^{5}	7^{7}	[7]
PR	(Austria) J Melzer (India) R Ramanathan	6^{4}	7^{7}	[10]
(United States) T Fritz (United States) M McDonald	7^{7}	6^{4}	[6]
(India) Y Bhambri (Australia) M Ebden	2	6	[7]
2	(United States) N Monroe (Australia) J-P Smith	6	4	[10]

Quarterfinals
1	(Pakistan) A-u-H Qureshi (India) D Sharan	3	3
WC	(Australia) A Bolt (Australia) L Hewitt	6	6
4	(United Kingdom) K Skupski (United Kingdom) N Skupski	6	7^{7}
(India) S Balaji (India) V Vardhan	4	6^{4}
(United Kingdom) L Bambridge (United Kingdom) J O'Mara	7^{7}	6^{5}	[10]
(United Kingdom) J Salisbury (Canada) A Shamasdin	6^{5}	7^{7}	[8]
PR	(Austria) J Melzer (India) R Ramanathan	6	6^{3}	[2]
2	(United States) N Monroe (Australia) J-P Smith	4	7^{7}	[10]

Semifinals
WC	(Australia) A Bolt (Australia) L Hewitt	3	6^{3}
4	(United Kingdom) K Skupski (United Kingdom) N Skupski	6	7^{7}
(United Kingdom) L Bambridge (United Kingdom) J O'Mara	7	3	[10]
2	(United States) N Monroe (Australia) J-P Smith	5	6	[7]

Final
4	(United Kingdom) K Skupski (United Kingdom) N Skupski	6^{11}	6	[7]
(United Kingdom) L Bambridge (United Kingdom) J O'Mara	7^{13}	4	[10]
