= Connor Thomson =

Scottish tennis player (born 2001)

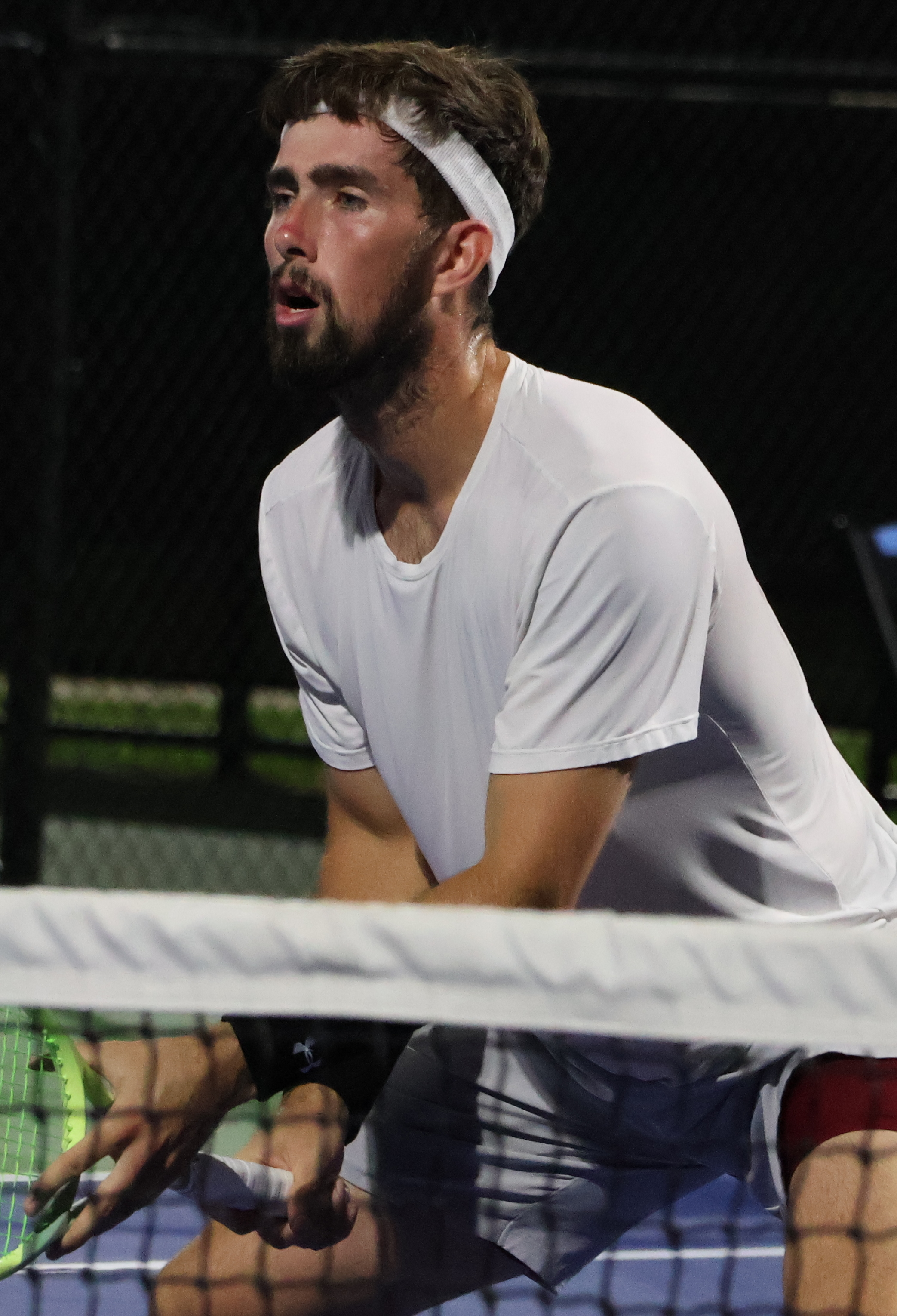
- Thomson at the 2023 Cary Challenger II
- Country (sports): United Kingdom
- Born: 16 January 2001 (age 25) Paisley, Scotland
- Height: 1.85 m (6 ft 1 in)
- Plays: Right-handed (one-handed backhand)
- College: University of South Carolina
- Coach: Josh Goffi
- Prize money: US $47,887

Singles
- Career record: 0–0
- Career titles: 0
- Highest ranking: No. 1,105 (17 November 2025)
- Current ranking: No. 1,153 (29 June 2026)

Doubles
- Career record: 1–2
- Career titles: 0
- Highest ranking: No. 278 (20 April 2026)
- Current ranking: No. 289 (29 June 2026)

Grand Slam doubles results
- Wimbledon: 2R (2023)
- Wimbledon Junior: QF (2019)
- Last updated on: 3 July 2026.

Connor Thomson (born 16 January 2001) is a British tennis player. He has a career high doubles ranking of No. 278 achieved on 20 April 2026 and a singles ranking of No. 1,105 achieved on 17 November 2025.

== Early and personal life ==
The son of former-footballer Malky Thomson, he has a brother called Callum. From Paisley, he attended Gryffe High School in Renfrewshire before attending the University of South Carolina in the United States. In 2023 Thomson received all-American honours for the second consecutive year. In 2023, he and Toby Samuel became the number one ranked doubles team in Collegiate tennis.

== Career ==
A keen footballer in his youth, Thomson was in the football academy of St. Mirren F.C. but opted to concentrate on tennis. In 2019 he reached the quarterfinals of the Boys’ doubles at the 2019 Wimbledon Championships alongside Jacob Fearnley. In 2020 he was included as part of Tennis Scotland’s new national player programme.

In June 2023, Thomson received a wildcard with his partner Toby Samuel for the Men's doubles at the 2023 Surbiton Trophy and the pair beat the second seeds Andre Goransson and Ben McLachlan in straight sets before losing to eventual finalists Alexei Popyrin and Aleksandar Vukic in the quarterfinals. They then reached the semifinals of the 2023 Nottingham Open. He and Samuel were subsequently awarded wildcards into the 2023 Wimbledon Championships. They won their opening match against Pedro Cachin and Yannick Hanfmann. In the second round they had their run ended with a 6-3, 7-6 defeat to experience pair Santiago González of Mexico and Frenchman Edouard Roger-Vasselin.
