= 2023 Surbiton Trophy – Men's doubles =

Men's doubles
- 2023 Surbiton Trophy

Final
- Champions: (United Kingdom) Liam Broady (United Kingdom) Jonny O'Mara
- Runners-up: (Australia) Alexei Popyrin (Australia) Aleksandar Vukic
- Score: 6–4, 5–7, [10–8]

Events
Singles	men	women
Doubles	men	women
- Surbiton Trophy

Julian Cash and Henry Patten were the defending champions but withdrew from their semifinal match against Liam Broady and Jonny O'Mara.

Broady and O'Mara won the title after defeating Alexei Popyrin and Aleksandar Vukic 6–4, 5–7, [10–8] in the final.

== Seeds ==
1. (United Kingdom) Julian Cash / (United Kingdom) Henry Patten (semifinals, withdrew)
2. (Sweden) André Göransson / (Japan) Ben McLachlan (first round)
3. (India) Sriram Balaji / (Ecuador) Gonzalo Escobar (quarterfinals)
4. (United States) William Blumberg / (Australia) Max Purcell (withdrew)

== Draw ==
Key

- Q = Qualifier
- WC = Wild card
- LL = Lucky loser
- Alt = Alternate
- ITF = ITF entry
- PR = Protected ranking
- SR = Special ranking
- SE = Special exempt
- JE = Junior exempt
- JR = Junior Accelerator Programme entrant
- CO = College Accelerator Programme entrant
- NG = Next Gen Accelerator Program entrant
- w/o = Walkover
- r = Retired
- d = Defaulted

First round
1	(United Kingdom) J Cash (United Kingdom) H Patten	7^{7}	6^{5}	[10]
WC	(United Kingdom) L Johnson (United Kingdom) R Peniston	6^{0}	7^{7}	[5]
(Belgium) Z Bergs (Netherlands) G Brouwer	4	6	[10]
Alt	(United Kingdom) C Broom (United Kingdom) M Whitehouse	6	3	[12]
Alt	(United States) A Kovacevic (China) J Shang	3	3
(United Kingdom) L Broady (United Kingdom) J O'Mara	6	6
(France) H Grenier (France) C Lestienne	7^{7}	7
(Pakistan) A-u-H Qureshi (India) D Sharan	6^{2}	5
(Australia) A de Minaur (Australia) R Hijikata	6^{4}	5
(United States) R Galloway (Australia) J-P Smith	7^{7}	7
(Chinese Taipei) Y-h Hsu (Australia) L Saville	6^{4}	5
3	(India) S Balaji (Ecuador) G Escobar	7^{7}	7
(Australia) A Popyrin (Australia) A Vukic	6	7
(United States) C Eubanks (Colombia) N Mejía	4	5
WC	(United Kingdom) T Samuel (United Kingdom) C Thomson	6	7^{7}
2	(Sweden) A Göransson (Japan) B McLachlan	2	6^{3}

Quarterfinals
1	(United Kingdom) J Cash (United Kingdom) H Patten	6^{5}	6	[12]
Alt	(United Kingdom) C Broom (United Kingdom) M Whitehouse	7^{7}	4	[10]
(United Kingdom) L Broady (United Kingdom) J O'Mara	6	6
(France) H Grenier (France) C Lestienne	3	2
(United States) R Galloway (Australia) J-P Smith	7^{7}	3	[10]
3	(India) S Balaji (Ecuador) G Escobar	6^{5}	6	[7]
(Australia) A Popyrin (Australia) A Vukic	6^{6}	7	[12]
WC	(United Kingdom) T Samuel (United Kingdom) C Thomson	7^{8}	5	[10]

Semifinals
1	(United Kingdom) J Cash (United Kingdom) H Patten
(United Kingdom) L Broady (United Kingdom) J O'Mara	w/o
(United States) R Galloway (Australia) J-P Smith	3	6	[11]
(Australia) A Popyrin (Australia) A Vukic	6	0	[13]

Final
(United Kingdom) L Broady (United Kingdom) J O'Mara	6	5	[10]
(Australia) A Popyrin (Australia) A Vukic	4	7	[8]
