= 2017 Aegon Surbiton Trophy – Men's doubles =

Men's doubles
- 2017 Aegon Surbiton Trophy

Final
- Champions: (New Zealand) Marcus Daniell (Pakistan) Aisam-ul-Haq Qureshi
- Runners-up: (Philippines) Treat Huey (United States) Denis Kudla
- Score: 6–3, 7–6^{(7–0)}

Events
Singles	men	women
Doubles	men	women
← 2016 ·	Aegon Surbiton Trophy	· 2018 →

Purav Raja and Divij Sharan were the defending champions but chose not to defend their title.

Marcus Daniell and Aisam-ul-Haq Qureshi won the title after defeating Treat Huey and Denis Kudla 6–3, 7–6^{(7–0)} in the final.

== Seeds ==
1. (New Zealand) Marcus Daniell / (Pakistan) Aisam-ul-Haq Qureshi (champions)
2. (United States) Nicholas Monroe / (New Zealand) Artem Sitak (semifinals)
3. (Australia) Sam Groth / (Brazil) André Sá (quarterfinals)
4. (Israel) Jonathan Erlich / (Austria) Philipp Oswald (quarterfinals)

== Draw ==
=== Key ===
- Q = Qualifier
- WC = Wild card
- LL = Lucky loser
- Alt = Alternate
- SE = Special exempt
- PR = Protected ranking
- ITF = ITF entry
- JE = Junior exempt
- w/o = Walkover
- r = Retired
- d = Defaulted
- SR = Special ranking

First round
1	(New Zealand) M Daniell (Pakistan) A-u-H Qureshi	4	7	[10]
PR	(Australia) M Ebden (Tunisia) M Jaziri	6	5	[6]
(Germany) D Brown (India) J Nedunchezhiyan	7^{7}	6^{3}	[11]
(United Kingdom) K Skupski (United Kingdom) N Skupski	6^{5}	7^{7}	[9]
3	(Australia) S Groth (Brazil) A Sá	6	6
(Romania) M Copil (Australia) J Thompson	3	0
WC	(United Kingdom) B Klein (United Kingdom) J Salisbury	6	3	[10]
(Cyprus) M Baghdatis (Israel) D Sela	4	6	[7]
(Philippines) T Huey (United States) D Kudla	6	6
WC	(United Kingdom) D Evans (United Kingdom) L Glasspool	3	4
(Australia) M Polmans (Australia) A Whittington	6^{3}	5
4	(Israel) J Erlich (Austria) P Oswald	7^{7}	7
(Australia) M Reid (Australia) J-P Smith	6	6
WC	(United Kingdom) L Bambridge (United Kingdom) C Norrie	4	4
(Thailand) Sa Ratiwatana (Thailand) So Ratiwatana	6^{2}	7^{7}	[3]
2	(United States) N Monroe (New Zealand) A Sitak	7^{7}	6^{5}	[10]

Quarterfinals
1	(New Zealand) M Daniell (Pakistan) A-u-H Qureshi	6	7^{7}
(Germany) D Brown (India) J Nedunchezhiyan	2	6^{3}
3	(Australia) S Groth (Brazil) A Sá	7^{7}	5	[3]
WC	(United Kingdom) B Klein (United Kingdom) J Salisbury	6^{4}	7	[10]
(Philippines) T Huey (United States) D Kudla	7^{7}	7^{7}
4	(Israel) J Erlich (Austria) P Oswald	6^{5}	6^{1}
(Australia) M Reid (Australia) J-P Smith	7^{9}	4	[11]
2	(United States) N Monroe (New Zealand) A Sitak	6^{7}	6	[13]

Semifinals
1	(New Zealand) M Daniell (Pakistan) A-u-H Qureshi	5	6	[10]
WC	(United Kingdom) B Klein (United Kingdom) J Salisbury	7	4	[6]
(Philippines) T Huey (United States) D Kudla	4	7^{7}	[10]
2	(United States) N Monroe (New Zealand) A Sitak	6	6^{5}	[5]

Final
1	(New Zealand) M Daniell (Pakistan) A-u-H Qureshi	6	7^{7}
(Philippines) T Huey (United States) D Kudla	3	6^{0}
