= 2022 Surbiton Trophy – Men's singles =

Men's singles
- 2022 Surbiton Trophy

Final
- Champion: (Australia) Jordan Thompson
- Runner-up: (United States) Denis Kudla
- Score: 7–5, 6–3

Events
Singles	men	women
Doubles	men	women
← 2019 ·	Surbiton Trophy	· 2023 →

Dan Evans was the defending champion but chose not to defend his title.

Jordan Thompson won the title after defeating Denis Kudla 7–5, 6–3 in the final.

== Seeds ==
1. (United Kingdom) Andy Murray (semifinals)
2. (France) Adrian Mannarino (first round)
3. (South Korea) Kwon Soon-woo (first round)
4. (Australia) James Duckworth (first round)
5. (United States) Brandon Nakashima (quarterfinals)
6. (Chile) Alejandro Tabilo (withdrew)
7. (United States) Denis Kudla (final)
8. (Australia) Jordan Thompson (champion)
9. (Australia) Thanasi Kokkinakis (first round)

== Draw ==
=== Key ===
- Q = Qualifier
- WC = Wild card
- LL = Lucky loser
- Alt = Alternate
- SE = Special exempt
- PR = Protected ranking
- ITF = ITF entry
- JE = Junior exempt
- w/o = Walkover
- r = Retired
- d = Defaulted
- SR = Special ranking

=== Finals ===
Semifinals
1	(United Kingdom) Andy Murray	7	6^{4}	3
7	(United States) Denis Kudla	5	7^{7}	6
8	(Australia) Jordan Thompson	6	1	6
Q	(Finland) Otto Virtanen	3	6	4

Final
7	(United States) Denis Kudla	5	3
8	(Australia) Jordan Thompson	7	6

=== Top half ===
First round
1	(United Kingdom) A Murray	6	6
(Austria) J Rodionov	2	1
(Moldova) R Albot	4	4
Q	(Netherlands) G Brouwer	6	6
(United States) S Kozlov	6	7^{7}
(Germany) M Moraing	3	6^{4}
(Switzerland) M-A Hüsler	6	6^{10}	2
5	(United States) B Nakashima	4	7^{12}	6
4	(Australia) J Duckworth	7^{7}	1	3
Q	(France) P-H Herbert	6^{5}	6	6
(United States) S Querrey	4	6^{5}
Q	(Australia) M Purcell	6	7^{7}
(United Kingdom) L Broady	4	6	6
Alt	(United Kingdom) J Clarke	6	3	2
(Australia) A Popyrin	5	6	3
7	(United States) D Kudla	7	3	6

Second round
1	(United Kingdom) A Murray	7^{7}	7^{7}
Q	(Netherlands) G Brouwer	6^{4}	6^{3}
(United States) S Kozlov	4	3
5	(United States) B Nakashima	6	6
Q	(France) P-H Herbert	4	4
Q	(Australia) M Purcell	6	6
(United Kingdom) L Broady	6^{5}	3
7	(United States) D Kudla	7^{7}	6

Quarterfinals
1	(United Kingdom) A Murray	6	7^{7}
5	(United States) B Nakashima	4	6^{1}
Q	(Australia) M Purcell	4	6^{4}
7	(United States) D Kudla	6	7^{7}

Semifinals
1	(United Kingdom) A Murray	7	6^{4}	3
7	(United States) D Kudla	5	7^{7}	6

=== Bottom half ===
First round
8	(Australia) J Thompson	6	6
LL	(Romania) M Copil	3	4
PR	(Japan) Y Sugita	6	5	6^{2}
LL	(India) R Ramanathan	4	7	7^{7}
Q	(United Kingdom) M Whitehouse	3	2
WC	(United Kingdom) A Gray	6	6
(Australia) C O'Connell	4	6	6
3	(South Korea) S-w Kwon	6	4	3
9	(Australia) T Kokkinakis	3	6^{5}
Q	(Finland) O Virtanen	6	7^{7}
WC	(United Kingdom) P Jubb	6	7^{11}
Alt	(Kazakhstan) M Kukushkin	4	6^{9}
Q	(United Kingdom) B Harris	2	2
(United Kingdom) J Draper	6	6
WC	(United Kingdom) R Peniston	2	6	6
2	(France) A Mannarino	6	1	4

Second round
8	(Australia) J Thompson	7	6
LL	(India) R Ramanathan	5	3
WC	(United Kingdom) A Gray	3	6^{5}
(Australia) C O'Connell	6	7^{7}
Q	(Finland) O Virtanen	2	7	6
WC	(United Kingdom) P Jubb	6	5	3
(United Kingdom) J Draper	7^{11}	5	4
WC	(United Kingdom) R Peniston	6^{9}	7	6

Quarterfinals
8	(Australia) J Thompson	6	6
(Australia) C O'Connell	2	3
Q	(Finland) O Virtanen	6^{1}	6	7^{8}
WC	(United Kingdom) R Peniston	7^{7}	3	6^{6}

Semifinals
8	(Australia) J Thompson	6	1	6
Q	(Finland) O Virtanen	3	6	4
