= 2023 Surbiton Trophy – Men's singles =

Men's singles
- 2023 Surbiton Trophy

Final
- Champion: (United Kingdom) Andy Murray
- Runner-up: (Austria) Jurij Rodionov
- Score: 6–3, 6–2

Events
Singles	men	women
Doubles	men	women
← 2022 ·	Surbiton Trophy	· 2024 →

Jordan Thompson was the defending champion but lost in the semifinals to Andy Murray.

Murray won the title after defeating Jurij Rodionov 6–3, 6–2 in the final.

== Seeds ==
1. (United Kingdom) Dan Evans (second round)
2. (United Kingdom) Andy Murray (champion)
3. (United States) Mackenzie McDonald (first round)
4. (Australia) Max Purcell (withdrew)
5. (Australia) Jason Kubler (quarterfinals)
6. (France) Constant Lestienne (quarterfinals)
7. Ilya Ivashka (second round)
8. (United States) Christopher Eubanks (second round)

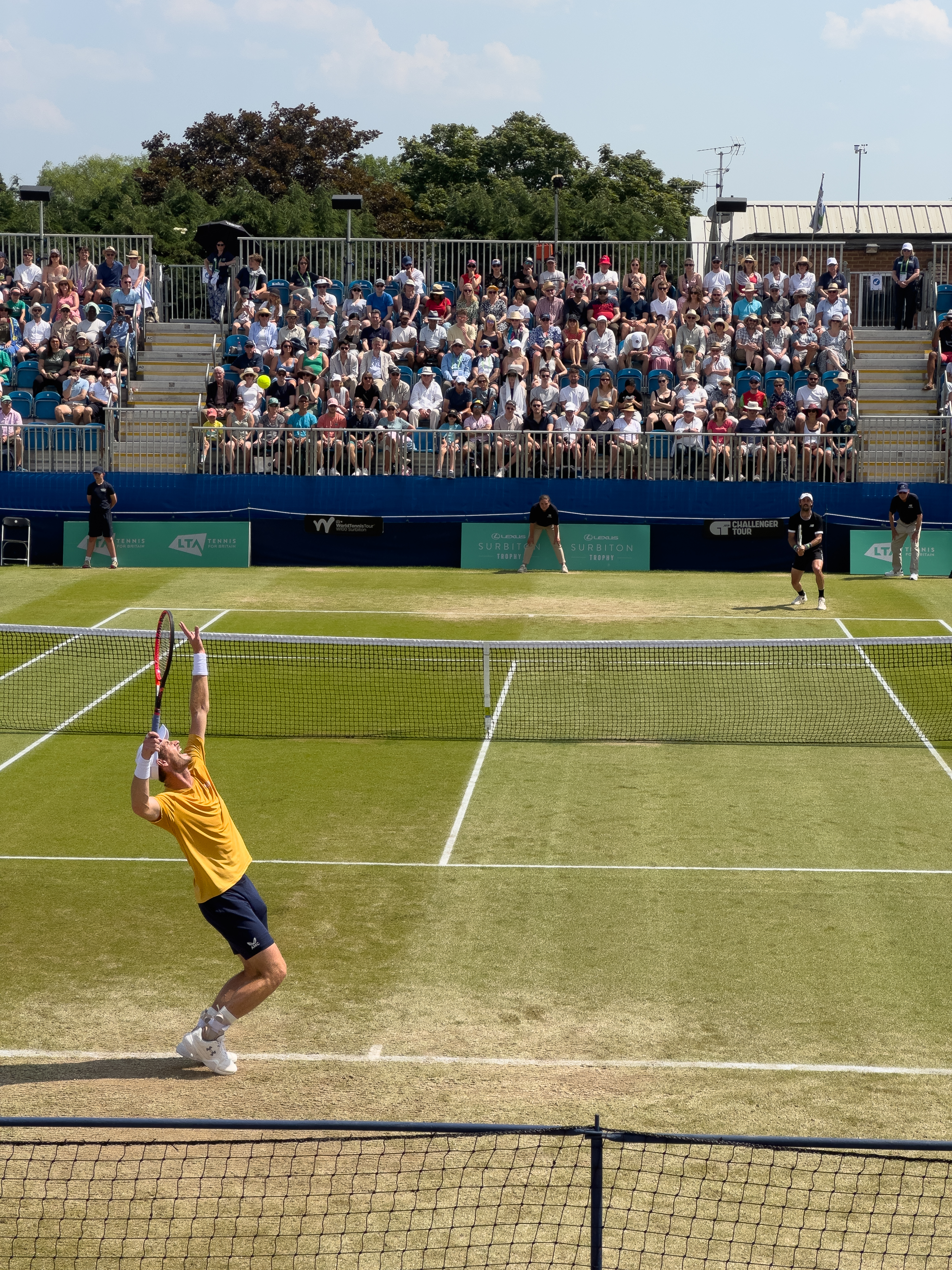
Andy Murray serving in the semi-final of the Surbiton Trophy.

== Draw ==
=== Key ===
- Q = Qualifier
- WC = Wild card
- LL = Lucky loser
- Alt = Alternate
- ITF = ITF entry
- PR = Protected ranking
- SR = Special ranking
- SE = Special exempt
- JE = Junior exempt
- JR = Junior Accelerator Programme entrant
- CO = College Accelerator Programme entrant
- NG = Next Gen Accelerator Program entrant
- w/o = Walkover
- r = Retired
- d = Defaulted

=== Finals ===
Semifinals
(Austria) Jurij Rodionov	6	6
(Belgium) Zizou Bergs	2	4
(Australia) Jordan Thompson	6^{5}	3
2/WC	(United Kingdom) Andy Murray	7^{7}	6

Final
(Austria) Jurij Rodionov	3	2
2/WC	(United Kingdom) Andy Murray	6	6

=== Top half ===
First round
1/WC	(United Kingdom) D Evans	6	6
LL	(Australia) J McCabe	4	4
(United Kingdom) L Broady	4	4
Alt	(Canada) G Diallo	6	6
(Finland) O Virtanen	4	2
(Austria) J Rodionov	6	6
(United States) A Kovacevic	3	7^{9}	3
8	(United States) C Eubanks	6	6^{7}	6
Q	(United Kingdom) M Whitehouse	6^{4}	2
(Belgium) Z Bergs	7^{7}	6
(Australia) A Popyrin	7^{7}	4	6^{6}
Q	(Australia) L Saville	6^{3}	6	7^{8}
(Australia) C O'Connell	3	7	2
(United States) D Kudla	6	5	6
Q	(United Kingdom) D Cox	6	3	5
6	(France) C Lestienne	3	6	7

Second round
1/WC	(United Kingdom) D Evans	5	2
Alt	(Canada) G Diallo	7	6
(Austria) J Rodionov	6	6
8	(United States) C Eubanks	2	4
(Belgium) Z Bergs	6	7^{7}
Q	(Australia) L Saville	2	6^{4}
(United States) D Kudla	6^{4}	4
6	(France) C Lestienne	7^{7}	6

Quarterfinals
Alt	(Canada) G Diallo	4	4
(Austria) J Rodionov	6	6
(Belgium) Z Bergs	7^{7}	6
6	(France) C Lestienne	6^{2}	3

Semifinals
(Austria) J Rodionov	6	6
(Belgium) Z Bergs	2	4

=== Bottom half ===
First round
7	I Ivashka	7	6
(France) H Grenier	5	1
(Australia) R Hijikata	6	7
Q	(United Kingdom) B Harris	3	5
LL	(United States) Z Svajda	7^{8}	6
(Australia) A Vukic	6^{6}	3
(Australia) J Thompson	6	6
3	(United States) M McDonald	4	4
5	(Australia) J Kubler	6	7^{7}
(Netherlands) G Brouwer	1	6^{4}
PR	(Czech Republic) J Veselý	4	2
WC	(United Kingdom) R Peniston	6	6
Q	(China) Y Bu	7^{7}	7
Q	(United Kingdom) H Wendelken	6^{2}	5
PR	(South Korea) H Chung	3	2
2/WC	(United Kingdom) A Murray	6	6

Second round
7	I Ivashka	6^{2}	6^{4}
(Australia) R Hijikata	7^{7}	7^{7}
LL	(United States) Z Svajda	2	5
(Australia) J Thompson	6	7
5	(Australia) J Kubler	6	7^{7}
WC	(United Kingdom) R Peniston	3	6^{5}
Q	(China) Y Bu	6^{1}	4
2/WC	(United Kingdom) A Murray	7^{7}	6

Quarterfinals
(Australia) R Hijikata	6^{1}	2
(Australia) J Thompson	7^{7}	6
5	(Australia) J Kubler	6	3	4
2/WC	(United Kingdom) A Murray	3	6	6

Semifinals
(Australia) J Thompson	6^{5}	3
2/WC	(United Kingdom) A Murray	7^{7}	6
