= 2023 Surbiton Trophy – Women's doubles =

Women's doubles
- 2023 Surbiton Trophy

Final
- Champions: (United States) Sophie Chang (Belgium) Yanina Wickmayer
- Runners-up: (United Kingdom) Alicia Barnett (United Kingdom) Olivia Nicholls
- Score: 6–4, 6–1

Events
Singles	men	women
Doubles	men	women
← 2022 ·	Surbiton Trophy	· 2024 →

Ingrid Neel and Rosalie van der Hoek were the defending champions but chose not to participate.

Sophie Chang and Yanina Wickmayer won the title, defeating Alicia Barnett and Olivia Nicholls in the final, 6–4, 6–1.

== Seeds ==
1. (Switzerland) Viktorija Golubic / (United States) Sabrina Santamaria (first round)
2. (Slovakia) Viktória Hrunčáková / (Slovakia) Tereza Mihalíková (quarterfinals)
3. (United Kingdom) Alicia Barnett / (United Kingdom) Olivia Nicholls (final)
4. (United States) Sophie Chang / (Belgium) Yanina Wickmayer (champions)

== Draw ==
Key

- Q = Qualifier
- WC = Wild card
- LL = Lucky loser
- Alt = Alternate
- ITF = ITF entry
- PR = Protected ranking
- SR = Special ranking
- SE = Special exempt
- JE = Junior exempt
- JR = Junior Accelerator Programme entrant
- CO = College Accelerator Programme entrant
- NG = Next Gen Accelerator Program entrant
- w/o = Walkover
- r = Retired
- d = Defaulted

First round
1	(Switzerland) V Golubic (United States) S Santamaria	6^{5}	6	[6]
(Australia) P Hon (United Kingdom) K Swan	7^{7}	1	[10]
(Australia) O Gadecki (United Kingdom) E Silva	6	6
WC	(United Kingdom) L John-Baptiste (United Kingdom) Y Miyazaki	0	3
4	(United States) S Chang (Belgium) Y Wickmayer	6	6
(United Kingdom) N Bains (United Kingdom) M Lumsden	1	2
(United States) A Krueger (United States) E Mandlik	6	6
(Canada) C Zhao (China) L Zhu	3	4
(Belgium) M Kempen (United Kingdom) E Webley-Smith	4	6	[5]
(United States) Q Gleason (France) E Lechemia	6	3	[10]
(United Kingdom) H Dart (United Kingdom) H Watson	1	6^{4}
3	(United Kingdom) A Barnett (United Kingdom) O Nicholls	6	7^{7}
(United Kingdom) E Appleton (Germany) J Lohoff	6	6
(Australia) K Birrell (Brazil) I Gamarra Martins	0	4
(United Kingdom) F Christie (United Kingdom) A Collins	6	3	[4]
2	(Slovakia) V Hrunčáková (Slovakia) T Mihalíková	4	6	[10]

Quarterfinals
(Australia) P Hon (United Kingdom) K Swan	4	6	[12]
(Australia) O Gadecki (United Kingdom) E Silva	6	3	[14]
4	(United States) S Chang (Belgium) Y Wickmayer	6	6
(United States) A Krueger (United States) E Mandlik	3	2
(United States) Q Gleason (France) E Lechemia	6^{3}	5
3	(United Kingdom) A Barnett (United Kingdom) O Nicholls	7^{7}	7
(United Kingdom) E Appleton (Germany) J Lohoff	7	7^{7}
2	(Slovakia) V Hrunčáková (Slovakia) T Mihalíková	5	6^{1}

Semifinals
(Australia) O Gadecki (United Kingdom) E Silva	2	3
4	(United States) S Chang (Belgium) Y Wickmayer	6	6
3	(United Kingdom) A Barnett (United Kingdom) O Nicholls	6	6
(United Kingdom) E Appleton (Germany) J Lohoff	4	4

Final
4	(United States) S Chang (Belgium) Y Wickmayer	6	6
3	(United Kingdom) A Barnett (United Kingdom) O Nicholls	4	1
