= 2019 Surbiton Trophy – Women's doubles =

Women's doubles
- 2019 Surbiton Trophy

Final
- Champions: (United States) Jennifer Brady (United States) Caroline Dolehide
- Runners-up: (United Kingdom) Heather Watson (Belgium) Yanina Wickmayer
- Score: 6–3, 6–4

Events
Singles	men	women
Doubles	men	women
← 2018 ·	Surbiton Trophy	· 2022 →

Jessica Moore and Ellen Perez were the defending champions, but chose to participate with different partners. Moore partnered alongside Monique Adamczak but lost in the first round to Viktorija Golubic and Ingrid Neel. Perez partnered alongside Arina Rodionova but lost in the first round to Naiktha Bains and Naomi Broady.

Jennifer Brady and Caroline Dolehide won the title, defeating Heather Watson and Yanina Wickmayer in the final, 6–3, 6–4.

== Seeds ==
1. (United States) Asia Muhammad / (Mexico) Giuliana Olmos (quarterfinals)
2. (Australia) Monique Adamczak / (Australia) Jessica Moore (first round)
3. (Russia) Anna Blinkova / (Georgia (country)) Oksana Kalashnikova (first round)
4. (Australia) Ellen Perez / (Australia) Arina Rodionova (first round)

== Draw ==
Key

- Q = Qualifier
- WC = Wild card
- LL = Lucky loser
- Alt = Alternate
- ITF = ITF entry
- PR = Protected ranking
- SR = Special ranking
- SE = Special exempt
- JE = Junior exempt
- JR = Junior Accelerator Programme entrant
- CO = College Accelerator Programme entrant
- NG = Next Gen Accelerator Program entrant
- w/o = Walkover
- r = Retired
- d = Defaulted

=== Draw ===
First round
1	(United States) A Muhammad (Mexico) G Olmos	3	7^{7}	[10]
(United States) S Santamaria (Brazil) L Stefani	6	6^{5}	[6]
(United States) J Brady (United States) C Dolehide	6	6
WC	(United Kingdom) SB Grey (United Kingdom) E Silva	4	4
3	(Russia) A Blinkova (Georgia (country)) O Kalashnikova	3	6^{3}
(United States) M Brengle (United States) S Vickery	6	7^{7}
(Chile) A Guarachi (New Zealand) E Routliffe	6^{4}	6	[4]
WC	(United Kingdom) K Dunne (United Kingdom) E Webley-Smith	7^{7}	2	[10]
(United Kingdom) H Watson (Belgium) Y Wickmayer	6	5	[10]
(United States) Q Gleason (United States) M Sanchez	3	7	[5]
WC	(United Kingdom) N Bains (United Kingdom) N Broady	6	6
4	(Australia) E Perez (Australia) Ar Rodionova	4	1
(Japan) M Kato (China) L Zhu	2	3
(Serbia) I Jorović (Czech Republic) T Smitková	6	6
(Switzerland) V Golubic (United States) I Neel	2	6	[10]
2	(Australia) M Adamczak (Australia) J Moore	6	3	[7]

Quarterfinals
1	(United States) A Muhammad (Mexico) G Olmos	6^{3}	3
(United States) J Brady (United States) C Dolehide	7^{7}	6
(United States) M Brengle (United States) S Vickery	w/o
WC	(United Kingdom) K Dunne (United Kingdom) E Webley-Smith
(United Kingdom) H Watson (Belgium) Y Wickmayer	6	3	[10]
WC	(United Kingdom) N Bains (United Kingdom) N Broady	4	6	[8]
(Serbia) I Jorović (Czech Republic) T Smitková	7^{7}	6
(Switzerland) V Golubic (United States) I Neel	6^{5}	4

Semifinals
(United States) J Brady (United States) C Dolehide	6	6
(United States) M Brengle (United States) S Vickery	2	2
(United Kingdom) H Watson (Belgium) Y Wickmayer	4	6	[11]
(Serbia) I Jorović (Czech Republic) T Smitková	6	3	[9]

Final
(United States) J Brady (United States) C Dolehide	6	6
(United Kingdom) H Watson (Belgium) Y Wickmayer	3	4
