= 2017 Aegon Surbiton Trophy – Women's doubles =

Women's doubles
- 2017 Aegon Surbiton Trophy

Final
- Champion: (Australia) Monique Adamczak (Australia) Storm Sanders
- Runner-up: (Chinese Taipei) Chang Kai-chen (New Zealand) Marina Erakovic
- Score: 7–5, 6–4

Events
Singles	men	women
Doubles	men	women
← 2016 ·	Aegon Surbiton Trophy	· 2018 →

Sanaz Marand and Melanie Oudin were the defending champions, but both players chose not to participate.

Monique Adamczak and Storm Sanders won the title, defeating Chang Kai-chen and Marina Erakovic in the final, 7–5, 6–4.

== Seeds ==
1. (United States) Asia Muhammad / (United Kingdom) Heather Watson (first round)
2. (United Kingdom) Naomi Broady / (United States) Maria Sanchez (quarterfinals)
3. (Poland) Paula Kania / (United Kingdom) Anna Smith (semifinals)
4. (United States) Ashley Weinhold / (United States) Caitlin Whoriskey (first round)

== Draw ==
=== Key ===
- Q = Qualifier
- WC = Wild card
- LL = Lucky loser
- Alt = Alternate
- SE = Special exempt
- PR = Protected ranking
- ITF = ITF entry
- JE = Junior exempt
- w/o = Walkover
- r = Retired
- d = Defaulted
- SR = Special ranking

First round
1	(United States) A Muhammad (United Kingdom) H Watson	4	1
(Australia) M Adamczak (Australia) S Sanders	6	6
WC	(United Kingdom) K Boulter (United Kingdom) G Taylor	4	1
WC	(United Kingdom) H Dart (United Kingdom) K Dunne	6	6
3	(Poland) P Kania (United Kingdom) A Smith	7^{7}	0	[10]
(United Kingdom) J Rae (United Kingdom) L Robson	6^{4}	6	[3]
(United States) J Loeb (Belgium) A-S Mestach	6	2	[11]
(Spain) G García Pérez (Sweden) C Lister	3	6	[9]
(Germany) N Geuer (United Kingdom) T Moore	3	4
(Chinese Taipei) K-c Chang (New Zealand) M Erakovic	6	6
(United States) J Boserup (Australia) Ar Rodionova	6	6
4	(United States) A Weinhold (United States) C Whoriskey	1	2
(Russia) A Blinkova (Russia) A Kudryavtseva	6	7
(India) A Raina (United Kingdom) E Webley-Smith	4	5
WC	(United Kingdom) SB Grey (United Kingdom) O Nicholls	0	4
2	(United Kingdom) N Broady (United States) M Sanchez	6	6

Quarterfinals
(Australia) M Adamczak (Australia) S Sanders	6	7^{7}
WC	(United Kingdom) H Dart (United Kingdom) K Dunne	2	6^{3}
3	(Poland) P Kania (United Kingdom) A Smith	w/o
(United States) J Loeb (Belgium) A-S Mestach
(Chinese Taipei) K-c Chang (New Zealand) M Erakovic	6	6
(United States) J Boserup (Australia) Ar Rodionova	1	2
(Russia) A Blinkova (Russia) A Kudryavtseva	6	6
2	(United Kingdom) N Broady (United States) M Sanchez	4	4

Semifinals
(Australia) M Adamczak (Australia) S Sanders	2	6	[10]
3	(Poland) P Kania (United Kingdom) A Smith	6	4	[7]
(Chinese Taipei) K-c Chang (New Zealand) M Erakovic	6	6
(Russia) A Blinkova (Russia) A Kudryavtseva	1	4

Final
(Australia) M Adamczak (Australia) S Sanders	7	6
(Chinese Taipei) K-c Chang (New Zealand) M Erakovic	5	4
