= 2017 Aegon Surbiton Trophy – Men's singles =

Men's singles
- 2017 Aegon Surbiton Trophy

Final
- Champion: (Japan) Yūichi Sugita
- Runner-up: (Australia) Jordan Thompson
- Score: 7–6^{(9–7)}, 7–6^{(10–8)}

Events
Singles	men	women
Doubles	men	women
- Aegon Surbiton Trophy

Lu Yen-hsun was the defending champion but chose not to defend his title.

Yūichi Sugita won the title after defeating Jordan Thompson 7–6^{(9–7)}, 7–6^{(10–8)} in the final.

== Seeds ==
1. (United Kingdom) Dan Evans (quarterfinals, retired)
2. (Cyprus) Marcos Baghdatis (first round)
3. (Russia) Daniil Medvedev (withdrew)
4. (Tunisia) Malek Jaziri (first round)
5. (Germany) Dustin Brown (semifinals)
6. (Japan) Yūichi Sugita (champion)
7. (Australia) Jordan Thompson (final)
8. (Romania) Marius Copil (semifinals)

== Draw ==
Key

- Q = Qualifier
- WC = Wild card
- LL = Lucky loser
- Alt = Alternate
- ITF = ITF entry
- PR = Protected ranking
- SR = Special ranking
- SE = Special exempt
- JE = Junior exempt
- JR = Junior Accelerator Programme entrant
- CO = College Accelerator Programme entrant
- NG = Next Gen Accelerator Program entrant
- w/o = Walkover
- r = Retired
- d = Defaulted

=== Finals ===
Semifinals
5	(Germany) Dustin Brown	3	5
7	(Australia) Jordan Thompson	6	7
8	(Romania) Marius Copil	5	4
6	(Japan) Yūichi Sugita	7	6

Final
7	(Australia) Jordan Thompson	6^{7}	6^{8}
6	(Japan) Yūichi Sugita	7^{9}	7^{10}

=== Top half ===
First round
1/WC	(United Kingdom) D Evans	6	6
WC	(United Kingdom) J Ward	3	1
Q	(Japan) A Santillan	6	2	6
(United States) S Kozlov	2	6	3
(South Korea) D-h Lee	3	1
PR	(India) Y Bhambri	6	6
(Canada) P Polansky	6^{6}	3
5	(Germany) D Brown	7^{8}	6
LL	(Australia) A Whittington	7^{7}	4	7
(United States) T Fritz	6^{4}	6	5
(United States) R Opelka	6	6^{11}	6
PR	(Australia) M Ebden	3	7^{13}	3
(Germany) T Kamke	6	6
Q	(Ecuador) R Quiroz	4	3
Q	(Canada) D Shapovalov	3	4
7	(Australia) J Thompson	6	6

Second round
1/WC	(United Kingdom) D Evans	7^{7}	6
Q	(Japan) A Santillan	6^{3}	3
PR	(India) Y Bhambri	6^{6}	6	5
5	(Germany) D Brown	7^{8}	2	7
LL	(Australia) A Whittington	3	7^{7}	3
(United States) R Opelka	6	6^{5}	6
(Germany) T Kamke	3	2
7	(Australia) J Thompson	6	6

Quarterfinals
1/WC	(United Kingdom) D Evans	6	4^{r}
5	(Germany) D Brown	3	2
(United States) R Opelka	5	2
7	(Australia) J Thompson	7	6

Semifinals
5	(Germany) D Brown	3	5
7	(Australia) J Thompson	6	7

=== Bottom half ===
First round
8	(Romania) M Copil	6	6
WC	(United Kingdom) J Clarke	4	3
(Slovakia) L Lacko	7	6^{3}	6
(Russia) K Kravchuk	5	7^{7}	4
(Ukraine) S Stakhovsky	6	6
(Belgium) R Bemelmans	2	4
WC	(United Kingdom) C Norrie	2	6	6
4/Alt	(Tunisia) M Jaziri	6	1	3
6	(Japan) Y Sugita	6	6
(Germany) P Gojowczyk	3	2
(Ukraine) I Marchenko	6^{1}	6	3
(France) K de Schepper	7^{7}	3	6
Q	(United States) D Novikov	6^{3}	7^{8}	2
(Australia) J Millman	7^{7}	6^{6}	6
(Israel) D Sela	6	7^{7}
2	(Cyprus) M Baghdatis	4	6^{4}

Second round
8	(Romania) M Copil	6	7^{9}
(Slovakia) L Lacko	3	6^{7}
(Ukraine) S Stakhovsky	6	7^{7}
WC	(United Kingdom) C Norrie	4	6^{2}
6	(Japan) Y Sugita	6	6
(France) K de Schepper	3	1
(Australia) J Millman	2	4
(Israel) D Sela	6	6

Quarterfinals
8	(Romania) M Copil	7	6
(Ukraine) S Stakhovsky	5	4
6	(Japan) Y Sugita	6	7
(Israel) D Sela	3	5

Semifinals
8	(Romania) M Copil	5	4
6	(Japan) Y Sugita	7	6
