= 2022 Surbiton Trophy =

Tennis tournament

- Date: 30 May–5 June 2022
- Edition: 17th (men); 18th (women)
- Category: ATP Challenger Tour; ITF Women's World Tennis Tour
- Prize money: €134,920 (men) $100,000 (women)
- Surface: Grass / Outdoor
- Location: Surbiton, United Kingdom

Champions

Men's singles
- (Australia) Jordan Thompson

Women's singles
- (Belgium) Alison Van Uytvanck

Men's doubles
- (United Kingdom) Julian Cash / (United Kingdom) Henry Patten

Women's doubles
- (United States) Ingrid Neel / (Netherlands) Rosalie van der Hoek
← 2019 ·	Surbiton Trophy	· 2023 →

The 2022 Surbiton Trophy was a professional tennis tournament played on outdoor grass. It was the 17th edition for men and 18th for women, which were respectively part of the 2022 ATP Challenger Tour and the 2022 ITF Women's World Tennis Tour. It took place in Surbiton, United Kingdom between 30 May and 5 June 2022.

== Champions ==
=== Men's singles ===
- (Australia) Jordan Thompson def. (United States) Denis Kudla 7–5, 6–3.

=== Men's doubles ===
- (United Kingdom) Julian Cash / (United Kingdom) Henry Patten def. (Kazakhstan) Aleksandr Nedovyesov / (Pakistan) Aisam-ul-Haq Qureshi 4–6, 6–3, [11–9].

=== Women's singles ===
- (Belgium) Alison Van Uytvanck def. (Australia) Arina Rodionova, 7–6^{(7–3)}, 6–2

=== Women's doubles ===
- (United States) Ingrid Neel / (Netherlands) Rosalie van der Hoek def. (Mexico) Fernanda Contreras / (United States) Catherine Harrison, 6–3, 6–3

== Men's singles main draw entrants ==
=== Seeds ===
Country	Player	Rank^{1}	Seed
GBR	Andy Murray	67	1
FRA	Adrian Mannarino	69	2
KOR	Kwon Soon-woo	71	3
AUS	James Duckworth	72	4
USA	Brandon Nakashima	75	5
~~CHI~~	~~Alejandro Tabilo~~	~~80~~	~~6~~
USA	Denis Kudla	81	7
AUS	Jordan Thompson	82	8
AUS	Thanasi Kokkinakis	86	9

- ^{1} Rankings are as of 23 May 2022.

=== Other entrants ===
The following players received wildcards into the singles main draw:

- (United Kingdom) Alastair Gray
- (United Kingdom) Paul Jubb
- (United Kingdom) Ryan Peniston

The following player received entry into the singles main draw using a protected ranking:

- (Japan) Yūichi Sugita

The following players received entry into the singles main draw as alternates:

- (United Kingdom) Jay Clarke
- (Kazakhstan) Mikhail Kukushkin

The following players received entry from the qualifying draw:

- (Netherlands) Gijs Brouwer
- (United Kingdom) Billy Harris
- (France) Pierre-Hugues Herbert
- (Australia) Max Purcell
- (Finland) Otto Virtanen
- (United Kingdom) Mark Whitehouse

The following players received entry as lucky losers:

- (Romania) Marius Copil
- (India) Ramkumar Ramanathan

== Women's singles main draw entrants ==
=== Seeds ===
Country	Player	Rank^{1}	Seed
USA	Madison Brengle	57	1
BEL	Alison Van Uytvanck	60	2
CHN	Zhu Lin	99	3
GER	Tatjana Maria	105	4
GBR	Harriet Dart	111	5
ROU	Mihaela Buzărnescu	120	6
USA	CoCo Vandeweghe	126	7
CHN	Wang Qiang	129	8

- ^{1} Rankings are as of 23 May 2022.

=== Other entrants ===
The following players received wildcards into the singles main draw:

- (United Kingdom) Jodie Burrage
- (United Kingdom) Sarah Beth Grey
- (United Kingdom) Sonay Kartal
- (United Kingdom) Yuriko Miyazaki

The following player received entry into the singles main draw using a protected ranking:

- (Belgium) Yanina Wickmayer

The following players received entry from the qualifying draw:

- (Croatia) Jana Fett
- (United Kingdom) Isabelle Lacy
- (Germany) Sabine Lisicki
- (Australia) Alana Parnaby
- (Poland) Urszula Radwańska
- (United Kingdom) Eden Silva
- (Serbia) Natalija Stevanović
- (Switzerland) Lulu Sun
