= 2019 Surbiton Trophy =

- Date: 3–9 June 2019
- Edition: 16th (men); 17th (women)
- Category: ATP Challenger Tour; ITF Women's World Tennis Tour
- Prize money: €137,560 (men) $100,000 (women)
- Surface: Grass
- Location: Surbiton, United Kingdom

Champions

Men's singles
- (United Kingdom) Dan Evans

Women's singles
- (United States) Alison Riske

Men's doubles
- (Spain) Marcel Granollers / (Japan) Ben McLachlan

Women's doubles
- (United States) Jennifer Brady / (United States) Caroline Dolehide
← 2018 ·	Surbiton Trophy	· 2022 →

The 2019 Surbiton Trophy was a professional tennis tournament played on outdoor grass courts. It was the seventeenth and sixteenth editions of the tournament which was part of the 2019 ITF Women's World Tennis Tour and the 2019 ATP Challenger Tour. It took place in Surbiton, United Kingdom between 3 and 9 June 2019.

== Men's singles main-draw entrants ==
=== Seeds ===
Country	Player	Rank^{1}	Seed
FRA	Ugo Humbert	61	1
AUS	Matthew Ebden	64	2
~~AUS~~	~~Jordan Thompson~~	~~69~~	~~3~~
GBR	Dan Evans	80	4
USA	Denis Kudla	81	5
ROU	Marius Copil	83	6
AUS	Bernard Tomic	84	7
CRO	Ivo Karlović	94	8
CAN	Brayden Schnur	106	9
ESP	Marcel Granollers	107	10
ESP	Feliciano López	108	11
UKR	Sergiy Stakhovsky	111	12
GER	Peter Gojowczyk	121	13
CAN	Peter Polansky	123	14
GER	Matthias Bachinger	126	15
AUS	Alex Bolt	130	16

- ^{1} Rankings are as of 27 May 2019.

=== Other entrants ===
The following players received wildcards into the singles main draw:

- (United Kingdom) Liam Broady
- (United Kingdom) Lloyd Glasspool
- (United Kingdom) Evan Hoyt
- (United Kingdom) Paul Jubb
- (United Kingdom) Ryan Peniston

The following players received entry from the qualifying draw:

- (Australia) Luke Saville
- (United Kingdom) Andrew Watson

The following players received entry as lucky losers:

- (United Kingdom) Alastair Gray
- (United Kingdom) Brydan Klein

== Women's singles main-draw entrants ==
=== Seeds ===
Country	Player	Rank^{1}	Seed
BEL	Alison Van Uytvanck	54	1
GER	Tatjana Maria	57	2
USA	Alison Riske	62	3
RUS	Evgeniya Rodina	70	4
SVK	Magdaléna Rybáriková	74	5
SUI	Viktorija Golubic	79	6
USA	Jennifer Brady	80	7
RUS	Vitalia Diatchenko	83	8

- ^{1} Rankings are as of 27 May 2019.

=== Other entrants ===
The following players received wildcards into the singles main draw:

- (United Kingdom) Naiktha Bains
- (United Kingdom) Jodie Anna Burrage
- (United Kingdom) Katy Dunne
- (United Kingdom) Maia Lumsden

The following players received entry from the qualifying draw:

- (Australia) Lizette Cabrera
- (United States) Caroline Dolehide
- (Russia) Anna Kalinskaya
- (United States) Ann Li
- (United States) Caty McNally
- (India) Ankita Raina

== Champions ==
=== Men's singles ===
- (United Kingdom) Dan Evans def. (Serbia) Viktor Troicki 6–2, 6–3.

=== Women's singles ===
- (United States) Alison Riske def. (Slovakia) Magdaléna Rybáriková, 6–7^{(5–7)}, 6–2, 6–2

=== Men's doubles ===
- (Spain) Marcel Granollers / (Japan) Ben McLachlan def. (South Korea) Kwon Soon-woo / (India) Ramkumar Ramanathan 4–6, 6–3, [10–2].

=== Women's doubles ===
- (United States) Jennifer Brady / (United States) Caroline Dolehide def. (United Kingdom) Heather Watson / (Belgium) Yanina Wickmayer, 6–3, 6–4
