= 2018 Fuzion 100 Surbiton Trophy – Men's singles =

Men's singles
- 2018 Fuzion 100 Surbiton Trophy

Final
- Champion: (France) Jérémy Chardy
- Runner-up: (Australia) Alex de Minaur
- Score: 6–4, 4–6, 6–2

Events
Singles	men	women
Doubles	men	women
- Fuzion 100 Surbiton Trophy

Yūichi Sugita was the defending champion but chose not to defend his title.

Jérémy Chardy won the title after defeating Alex de Minaur 6–4, 4–6, 6–2 in the final.

== Seeds ==
1. (France) Jérémy Chardy (champion)
2. (Australia) Jordan Thompson (first round)
3. (India) Yuki Bhambri (quarterfinals)
4. (Russia) Mikhail Youzhny (first round)
5. (Slovakia) Lukáš Lacko (second round)
6. (Australia) Alex de Minaur (final)
7. (United States) Mackenzie McDonald (second round)
8. (United States) Bjorn Fratangelo (first round)

== Draw ==
Key

- Q = Qualifier
- WC = Wild card
- LL = Lucky loser
- Alt = Alternate
- ITF = ITF entry
- PR = Protected ranking
- SR = Special ranking
- SE = Special exempt
- JE = Junior exempt
- JR = Junior Accelerator Programme entrant
- CO = College Accelerator Programme entrant
- NG = Next Gen Accelerator Program entrant
- w/o = Walkover
- r = Retired
- d = Defaulted

=== Finals ===
Semifinals
1	(France) Jérémy Chardy	6	7^{7}
Q	(United Kingdom) Dan Evans	4	6^{3}
6	(Australia) Alex de Minaur	6	6
Q	(Australia) Matthew Ebden	4	4

Final
1	(France) Jérémy Chardy	6	4	6
6	(Australia) Alex de Minaur	4	6	2

=== Top half ===
First round
1	(France) J Chardy	7^{12}	6
(United Kingdom) L Broady	6^{10}	3
(Spain) A Menéndez Maceiras	3	6	5
Q	(Germany) D Brands	6	4	7
(Kazakhstan) A Bublik	6	6^{5}	1
(United States) D Kudla	3	7^{7}	6
(United States) D Novikov	6	1	5
5	(Slovakia) L Lacko	4	6	7
4	(Russia) M Youzhny	6^{4}	5
(United States) K King	7^{7}	7
PR	(Austria) J Melzer	6	3	7^{7}
(Australia) M Polmans	4	6	6^{2}
(Italy) T Fabbiano	4	5
Q	(United Kingdom) D Evans	6	7
(Germany) M Moraing	3	6	7^{7}
8	(United States) B Fratangelo	6	3	6^{4}

Second round
1	(France) J Chardy	7^{7}	6
Q	(Germany) D Brands	6^{3}	3
(United States) D Kudla	6	6
5	(Slovakia) L Lacko	4	0
(United States) K King	4	4
PR	(Austria) J Melzer	6	6
Q	(United Kingdom) D Evans	7^{7}	6
(Germany) M Moraing	6^{4}	3

Quarterfinals
1	(France) J Chardy	7^{7}	4	7^{10}
(United States) D Kudla	6^{5}	6	6^{8}
PR	(Austria) J Melzer	6^{3}	4
Q	(United Kingdom) D Evans	7^{7}	6

Semifinals
1	(France) J Chardy	6	7^{7}
Q	(United Kingdom) D Evans	4	6^{3}

=== Bottom half ===
First round
6	(Australia) A de Minaur	6	6
WC	(United Kingdom) A Ward	4	1
WC	(United Kingdom) L Glasspool	6	3	4
Q	(United States) T Fritz	4	6	6
(Australia) A Bolt	6	6^{3}	6
WC	(United Kingdom) J Clarke	1	7^{7}	3
(Australia) T Kokkinakis	4	6^{4}
3	(India) Y Bhambri	6	7^{7}
7	(United States) M McDonald	6^{4}	7	6
(Canada) P Polansky	7^{7}	5	3
Q	(Australia) M Ebden	6^{5}	7	6
(Germany) D Brown	7^{7}	5	3
WC	(United Kingdom) J Ward	6	3	3
(Ukraine) S Stakhovsky	4	6	6
(India) R Ramanathan	6	3	6
2	(Australia) J Thompson	4	6	1

Second round
6	(Australia) A de Minaur	6	7^{7}
Q	(United States) T Fritz	4	6^{4}
(Australia) A Bolt	4	6	1
3	(India) Y Bhambri	6	3	6
7	(United States) M McDonald	3	7^{7}	3
Q	(Australia) M Ebden	6	6^{5}	6
(Ukraine) S Stakhovsky	6	7^{7}
(India) R Ramanathan	4	6^{4}

Quarterfinals
6	(Australia) A de Minaur	6	7
3	(India) Y Bhambri	3	5
Q	(Australia) M Ebden	6	6
(Ukraine) S Stakhovsky	4	4

Semifinals
6	(Australia) A de Minaur	6	6
Q	(Australia) M Ebden	4	4
