= 2017 Aegon Surbiton Trophy – Women's singles =

Women's singles
- 2017 Aegon Surbiton Trophy

Final
- Champion: (Slovakia) Magdaléna Rybáriková
- Runner-up: (United Kingdom) Heather Watson
- Score: 6–4, 7–5

Events
Singles	men	women
Doubles	men	women
- Aegon Surbiton Trophy

Marina Melnikova was the defending champion, but chose not to participate.

Magdaléna Rybáriková won the title defeating Heather Watson in the final, 6–4, 7–5.

== Seeds ==
1. (France) Océane Dodin (semifinals)
2. (Croatia) Donna Vekić (first round)
3. (Russia) Evgeniya Rodina (quarterfinals)
4. (United States) Julia Boserup (first round)
5. (Chinese Taipei) Chang Kai-chen (first round)
6. (United Kingdom) Heather Watson (final)
7. (Russia) Anna Blinkova (first round)
8. (United Kingdom) Naomi Broady (quarterfinals)

== Draw ==
Key

- Q = Qualifier
- WC = Wild card
- LL = Lucky loser
- Alt = Alternate
- ITF = ITF entry
- PR = Protected ranking
- SR = Special ranking
- SE = Special exempt
- JE = Junior exempt
- JR = Junior Accelerator Programme entrant
- CO = College Accelerator Programme entrant
- NG = Next Gen Accelerator Program entrant
- w/o = Walkover
- r = Retired
- d = Defaulted

=== Finals ===
Semifinals
1	(France) Océane Dodin	3	2
PR	(Slovakia) Magdaléna Rybáriková	6	6
WC	(United Kingdom) Harriet Dart	1	2
6	(United Kingdom) Heather Watson	6	6

Final
PR	(Slovakia) Magdaléna Rybáriková	6	7
6	(United Kingdom) Heather Watson	4	5

=== Top half ===
First round
1	(France) O Dodin	7	6
Q	(Ukraine) D Yastremska	5	4
Q	(Poland) P Kania	4	6^{2}
(United States) K Ahn	6	7^{7}
WC	(United Kingdom) K Boulter	3	5
(Czech Republic) T Martincová	6	7
(United Kingdom) T Moore	2	3
8	(United Kingdom) N Broady	6	6
3	(Russia) E Rodina	6	7^{7}
(United States) S Vickery	2	6^{3}
(New Zealand) M Erakovic	6^{5}	6	6
(United Kingdom) L Robson	7^{7}	3	2
PR	(Kazakhstan) Z Diyas	6	6
(Australia) Ar Rodionova	2	4
PR	(Slovakia) M Rybáriková	6	6
5	(Chinese Taipei) K-c Chang	1	3

Second round
1	(France) O Dodin	6	6
(United States) K Ahn	3	4
(Czech Republic) T Martincová	7	6^{9}	6^{4}
8	(United Kingdom) N Broady	5	7^{11}	7^{7}
3	(Russia) E Rodina	6	6
(New Zealand) M Erakovic	3	3
PR	(Kazakhstan) Z Diyas	2	2
PR	(Slovakia) M Rybáriková	6	6

Quarterfinals
1	(France) O Dodin	7	7^{7}
8	(United Kingdom) N Broady	5	6^{1}
3	(Russia) E Rodina	4	4
PR	(Slovakia) M Rybáriková	6	6

Semifinals
1	(France) O Dodin	3	2
PR	(Slovakia) M Rybáriková	6	6

=== Bottom half ===
First round
7	(Russia) A Blinkova	4	3
Q	(United States) D Lao	6	6
Q	(Czech Republic) K Muchová	4	6	7^{7}
(United States) C Dolehide	6	4	6^{5}
WC	(United Kingdom) H Dart	6	2	6
(Spain) G García Pérez	3	6	4
(Australia) L Cabrera	7^{7}	3	6
4	(United States) J Boserup	6^{1}	6	2
6	(United Kingdom) H Watson	7^{7}	6
(Russia) A Kudryavtseva	6^{2}	1
(Belgium) A-S Mestach	1	2
PR	(Croatia) J Fett	6	6
WC	(United Kingdom) K Dunne	3	6	6
WC	(United Kingdom) G Taylor	6	4	3
(United States) J Loeb	7	6^{6}	6
2	(Croatia) D Vekić	5	7^{8}	4

Second round
Q	(United States) D Lao	6^{6}	3
Q	(Czech Republic) K Muchová	7^{8}	6
WC	(United Kingdom) H Dart	6	7
(Australia) L Cabrera	3	5
6	(United Kingdom) H Watson	6	3	6
PR	(Croatia) J Fett	1	6	2
WC	(United Kingdom) K Dunne	6	6
(United States) J Loeb	3	4

Quarterfinals
Q	(Czech Republic) K Muchová	0	2
WC	(United Kingdom) H Dart	6	6
6	(United Kingdom) H Watson	6	7^{8}
WC	(United Kingdom) K Dunne	1	6^{6}

Semifinals
WC	(United Kingdom) H Dart	1	2
6	(United Kingdom) H Watson	6	6
