= 2018 Fuzion 100 Surbiton Trophy =

- Date: 4–10 June
- Edition: 15th (ATP); 16th (ITF)
- Category: ATP Challenger Tour; ITF Women's Circuit
- Prize money: €127,000 (ATP) $100,000 (ITF)
- Surface: Grass
- Location: Surbiton, United Kingdom

Champions

Men's singles
- (France) Jérémy Chardy

Women's singles
- (United States) Alison Riske

Men's doubles
- (United Kingdom) Luke Bambridge / (United Kingdom) Jonny O'Mara

Women's doubles
- (Australia) Jessica Moore / (Australia) Ellen Perez
← 2017 ·	Surbiton Trophy	· 2019 →

The 2018 Fuzion 100 Surbiton Trophy was a professional tennis tournament played on outdoor grass courts. It was the fifteenth (ATP) and sixteenth (ITF) editions of the tournament and was part of the 2018 ATP Challenger Tour and the 2018 ITF Women's Circuit. It took place in Surbiton, United Kingdom, on 4–10 June 2018.

== Men's singles main draw entrants ==
=== Seeds ===
Country	Player	Rank^{1}	Seed
FRA	Jérémy Chardy	86	1
AUS	Jordan Thompson	91	2
IND	Yuki Bhambri	93	3
RUS	Mikhail Youzhny	98	4
SVK	Lukáš Lacko	99	5
AUS	Alex de Minaur	105	6
USA	Mackenzie McDonald	107	7
USA	Bjorn Fratangelo	109	8

- ^{1} Rankings as of 28 May 2018.

=== Other entrants ===
The following players received a wildcard into the singles main draw:

- (United Kingdom) Jay Clarke
- (United Kingdom) Lloyd Glasspool
- (United Kingdom) Alexander Ward
- (United Kingdom) James Ward

The following player received entry into the singles main draw using a protected ranking:

- (Austria) Jürgen Melzer

The following players received entry from the qualifying draw:

- (Germany) Daniel Brands
- (Australia) Matthew Ebden
- (United Kingdom) Dan Evans
- (United States) Taylor Fritz

== Women's singles main draw entrants ==
=== Seeds ===
Country	Player	Rank^{1}	Seed
GBR	Heather Watson	80	1
USA	Alison Riske	83	2
USA	Madison Brengle	101	3
BEL	Yanina Wickmayer	105	4
CRO	Jana Fett	109	5
RUS	Evgeniya Rodina	116	6
AUS	Arina Rodionova	123	7
USA	~~Caroline Dolehide~~	~~125~~	~~8~~
USA	Kristie Ahn	127	9

- ^{1} Rankings as of 28 May 2018.

=== Other entrants ===
The following players received a wildcard into the singles main draw:

- (United Kingdom) Jodie Anna Burrage
- (United Kingdom) Tara Moore
- (United Kingdom) Katie Swan
- (United Kingdom) Heather Watson

The following players received entry using protected rankings:

- (Serbia) Bojana Jovanovski Petrović

The following players received entry from the qualifying draw:

- (Georgia (country)) Mariam Bolkvadze
- (United States) Victoria Duval
- (Russia) Marina Melnikova
- (United States) Asia Muhammad

The following player received entry as a lucky loser:

- (United States) Nadja Gilchrist

== Champions ==
=== Men's singles ===
- (France) Jérémy Chardy def. (Australia) Alex de Minaur 6–4, 4–6, 6–2.

=== Women's singles ===
- (United States) Alison Riske def. (Switzerland) Conny Perrin, 6–2, 6–4

=== Men's doubles ===
- (United Kingdom) Luke Bambridge / (United Kingdom) Jonny O'Mara def. (United Kingdom) Ken Skupski / (United Kingdom) Neal Skupski 7–6^{(13–11)}, 4–6, [10–7].

=== Women's doubles ===
- (Australia) Jessica Moore / (Australia) Ellen Perez def. (Australia) Arina Rodionova / (Belgium) Yanina Wickmayer, 4–6, 7–5, [10–3]
