= 2023 Surbiton Trophy – Women's singles =

Women's singles
- 2023 Surbiton Trophy

Final
- Champion: (Belgium) Yanina Wickmayer
- Runner-up: (United Kingdom) Katie Swan
- Score: 2–6, 6–4, 7–6^{(7–1)}

Events
Singles	men	women
Doubles	men	women
- Surbiton Trophy

The 2023 Surbiton Trophy Women's Singles was an event at the 2023 Surbiton Trophy, a professional tennis tournament played on outdoor grass. Alison Van Uytvanck was the defending champion but chose not to participate.

Yanina Wickmayer won the title, defeating Katie Swan in the final, 2–6, 6–4, 7–6^{(7–1)}.

== Seeds ==
1. (Germany) Tatjana Maria (quarterfinals)
2. (United States) Alison Riske-Amritraj (first round)
3. (United States) Madison Brengle (first round)
4. (Australia) Kimberly Birrell (first round)
5. (United Kingdom) Jodie Burrage (first round)
6. (United States) Elizabeth Mandlik (second round)
7. (France) Océane Dodin (second round, retired)
8. (United Kingdom) Katie Boulter (semifinals)

== Draw ==
Key

- Q = Qualifier
- WC = Wild card
- LL = Lucky loser
- Alt = Alternate
- ITF = ITF entry
- PR = Protected ranking
- SR = Special ranking
- SE = Special exempt
- JE = Junior exempt
- JR = Junior Accelerator Programme entrant
- CO = College Accelerator Programme entrant
- NG = Next Gen Accelerator Program entrant
- w/o = Walkover
- r = Retired
- d = Defaulted

=== Finals ===
Semifinals
(United Kingdom) Katie Swan	6	6
WC	(United Kingdom) Yuriko Miyazaki	1	0
Q	(Belgium) Yanina Wickmayer	6	6
8	(United Kingdom) Katie Boulter	3	2

Final
(United Kingdom) Katie Swan	6	4	6^{1}
Q	(Belgium) Yanina Wickmayer	2	6	7^{7}

=== Top half ===
First round
1	(Germany) T Maria	6	2	6
Q	(France) C Monnet	4	6	3
(United Kingdom) H Dart	2	6	6
Q	(Belgium) M Kempen	6	4	3
(Canada) C Zhao	2	0
(United Kingdom) K Swan	6	6
Q	(United Kingdom) M Lumsden	5	6	3
7	(France) O Dodin	7	3	6
3	(United States) M Brengle	6^{2}	7	1
Q	(United Kingdom) I Lacy	7^{7}	5	6
(United States) A Krueger	6	5	1
(United States) S Vickery	2	7	6
WC	(United Kingdom) E Silva	6	6
(Mexico) M Zacarías	4	4
WC	(United Kingdom) Y Miyazaki	3	6	6
5	(United Kingdom) J Burrage	6	2	4

Second round
1	(Germany) T Maria	6	6^{5}	6
(United Kingdom) H Dart	4	7^{7}	4
(United Kingdom) K Swan	5
7	(France) O Dodin	3^{r}
Q	(United Kingdom) I Lacy	w/o
(United States) S Vickery
WC	(United Kingdom) E Silva	4	5
WC	(United Kingdom) Y Miyazaki	6	7

Quarterfinals
1	(Germany) T Maria	6	3	4
(United Kingdom) K Swan	3	6	6
Q	(United Kingdom) I Lacy	3	0
WC	(United Kingdom) Y Miyazaki	6	6

Semifinals
(United Kingdom) K Swan	6	6
WC	(United Kingdom) Y Miyazaki	1	0

=== Bottom half ===
First round
6	(United States) E Mandlik	6	6
Q	(United Kingdom) E Webley-Smith	3	0
WC	(United Kingdom) N Bains	3	4
Q	(Belgium) Y Wickmayer	6	6
Q	(Turkey) Z Sönmez	7^{7}	6
(Australia) P Hon	6^{1}	3
(Ukraine) D Snigur	6	6
4	(Australia) K Birrell	2	3
8	(United Kingdom) K Boulter	6	6
(Australia) O Gadecki	2	1
WC	(United Kingdom) S Kartal	6	6
(Slovakia) V Hrunčáková	3	2
(United Kingdom) H Watson	6	6^{3}	6^{6}
Q	(Australia) M Inglis	2	7^{7}	7^{8}
(Switzerland) V Golubic	6^{4}	6	6
2	(United States) A Riske-Amritraj	7^{7}	2	4

Second round
6	(United States) E Mandlik	2	1
Q	(Belgium) Y Wickmayer	6	6
Q	(Turkey) Z Sönmez	4	6	1
(Ukraine) D Snigur	6	2	6
8	(United Kingdom) K Boulter	3	6	6
WC	(United Kingdom) S Kartal	6	3	4
Q	(Australia) M Inglis	3	5
(Switzerland) V Golubic	6	7

Quarterfinals
Q	(Belgium) Y Wickmayer	6	4	7^{7}
(Ukraine) D Snigur	4	6	6^{4}
8	(United Kingdom) K Boulter	7	6
(Switzerland) V Golubic	5	2

Semifinals
Q	(Belgium) Y Wickmayer	6	6
8	(United Kingdom) K Boulter	3	2
