= 2018 Fuzion 100 Surbiton Trophy – Women's singles =

Women's singles
- 2018 Fuzion 100 Surbiton Trophy

Final
- Champion: (United States) Alison Riske
- Runner-up: (Switzerland) Conny Perrin
- Score: 6–2, 6–4

Events
Singles	men	women
Doubles	men	women
- Surbiton Trophy

Magdaléna Rybáriková was the defending champion, but chose not to participate.

Alison Riske won the title, defeating Conny Perrin in the final, 6–2, 6–4.

== Seeds ==
1. (United Kingdom) Heather Watson (first round)
2. (United States) Alison Riske (champion)
3. (United States) Madison Brengle (second round, withdrew)
4. (Belgium) Yanina Wickmayer (quarterfinals)
5. (Croatia) Jana Fett (second round)
6. (Russia) Evgeniya Rodina (first round)
7. (Australia) Arina Rodionova (first round)
8. (United States) Caroline Dolehide (withdrew)
9. (United States) Kristie Ahn (quarterfinals)

== Draw ==
Key

- Q = Qualifier
- WC = Wild card
- LL = Lucky loser
- Alt = Alternate
- ITF = ITF entry
- PR = Protected ranking
- SR = Special ranking
- SE = Special exempt
- JE = Junior exempt
- JR = Junior Accelerator Programme entrant
- CO = College Accelerator Programme entrant
- NG = Next Gen Accelerator Program entrant
- w/o = Walkover
- r = Retired
- d = Defaulted

=== Finals ===
Semifinals
(Switzerland) Conny Perrin	3	6	7^{7}
(United Kingdom) Harriet Dart	6	2	6^{5}
(Australia) Priscilla Hon	5	3
2	(United States) Alison Riske	7	6

Final
(Switzerland) Conny Perrin	2	4
2	(United States) Alison Riske	6	6

=== Top half ===
First round
1/WC	(United Kingdom) H Watson	6	4	3
(United Kingdom) G Taylor	3	6	6
(Hungary) F Stollár	6	6^{5}	7
(Australia) D Aiava	2	7^{7}	5
(India) A Raina	1	2
LL	(United States) N Gilchrist	6	6
(Switzerland) C Perrin	6^{4}	6	6
6	(Russia) E Rodina	7^{7}	2	4
4	(Belgium) Y Wickmayer	6	6
PR	(Serbia) B Jovanovski Petrović	3	1
Q	(United States) V Duval	5	6	4
WC	(United Kingdom) T Moore	7	2	1^{r}
Q	(Georgia (country)) M Bolkvadze	3	3
(United Kingdom) H Dart	6	6
WC	(United Kingdom) K Swan	2	6	6
7	(Australia) Ar Rodionova	6	4	3

Second round
(United Kingdom) G Taylor	6	6
(Hungary) F Stollár	2	3
LL	(United States) N Gilchrist	1	6	3
(Switzerland) C Perrin	6	3	6
4	(Belgium) Y Wickmayer	6	3	6
Q	(United States) V Duval	4	6	1
(United Kingdom) H Dart	6	6
WC	(United Kingdom) K Swan	2	4

Quarterfinals
(United Kingdom) G Taylor	7^{7}	4	1
(Switzerland) C Perrin	6^{3}	6	6
4	(Belgium) Y Wickmayer	2	6	0
(United Kingdom) H Dart	6	3	6

Semifinals
(Switzerland) C Perrin	3	6	7^{7}
(United Kingdom) H Dart	6	2	6^{5}

=== Bottom half ===
First round
5	(Croatia) J Fett	6	6
(Australia) L Cabrera	1	4
(United Kingdom) K Boulter	6^{1}	7^{7}	6
Q	(United States) A Muhammad	7^{7}	6^{4}	3
(Australia) P Hon	4	7	6
(United States) J Loeb	6	5	2
Q	(Russia) M Melnikova	6	2	3
3	(United States) M Brengle	3	6	6
9	(United States) K Ahn	7	6
(Ukraine) D Yastremska	5	4
(Australia) O Rogowska	4	4
(United States) D Lao	6	6
WC	(United Kingdom) JA Burrage	6^{8}	3
(United Kingdom) K Dunne	7^{10}	6
(United States) I Falconi	5	1
2	(United States) A Riske	7	6

Second round
5	(Croatia) J Fett	5	4
(United Kingdom) K Boulter	7	6
(Australia) P Hon	w/o
3	(United States) M Brengle
9	(United States) K Ahn	4	6	6
(United States) D Lao	6	2	2
(United Kingdom) K Dunne	5	0
2	(United States) A Riske	7	6

Quarterfinals
(United Kingdom) K Boulter	6	2	3
(Australia) P Hon	4	6	6
9	(United States) K Ahn	0	4
2	(United States) A Riske	6	6

Semifinals
(Australia) P Hon	5	3
2	(United States) A Riske	7	6
