= 2017 Aegon Surbiton Trophy =

- Date: 5–11 June
- Edition: 14th (ATP); 15th (ITF)
- Category: ATP Challenger Tour; ITF Women's Circuit
- Prize money: €127,000 (ATP) $100,000 (ITF)
- Surface: Grass
- Location: Surbiton, United Kingdom

Champions

Men's singles
- (Japan) Yūichi Sugita

Women's singles
- (Slovakia) Magdaléna Rybáriková

Men's doubles
- (New Zealand) Marcus Daniell / (Pakistan) Aisam-ul-Haq Qureshi

Women's doubles
- (Australia) Monique Adamczak / (Australia) Storm Sanders
← 2016 ·	Aegon Surbiton Trophy	· 2018 →

The 2017 Aegon Surbiton Trophy is a professional tennis tournament played on outdoor grass courts. It is the fourteenth edition of the tournament for the men and the fifteenth edition of the tournament for the women. It is part of the 2017 ATP Challenger Tour and the 2017 ITF Women's Circuit, offering a total prize money of €127,000 for men and $100,000 for women. It took place in Surbiton, United Kingdom, on 5–11 June 2017.

== Men's singles main draw entrants ==
=== Seeds ===
Country	Player	Rank^{1}	Seed
GBR	Dan Evans	55	1
CYP	Marcos Baghdatis	62	2
~~RUS~~	~~Daniil Medvedev~~	~~66~~	~~3~~
TUN	Malek Jaziri	71	4
GER	Dustin Brown	76	5
JPN	Yūichi Sugita	78	6
AUS	Jordan Thompson	92	7
ROU	Marius Copil	94	8

- ^{1} Rankings as of 29 May 2017.

=== Other entrants ===
The following players received wildcards into the singles main draw:

- (United Kingdom) Jay Clarke
- (United Kingdom) Dan Evans
- (United Kingdom) Cameron Norrie
- (United Kingdom) James Ward

The following players received entry into the singles main draw using protected rankings:

- (India) Yuki Bhambri
- (Australia) Matthew Ebden

The following player received entry into the singles main draw as an alternate:

- (Tunisia) Malek Jaziri

The following players received entry from the qualifying draw:

- (United States) Dennis Novikov
- (Ecuador) Roberto Quiroz
- (Japan) Akira Santillan
- (Canada) Denis Shapovalov

The following player received entry as a lucky loser:

- (Australia) Andrew Whittington

== Women's singles main draw entrants ==
=== Seeds ===
Country	Player	Rank^{1}	Seed
FRA	Océane Dodin	56	1
CRO	Donna Vekić	75	2
RUS	Evgeniya Rodina	80	3
USA	Julia Boserup	85	4
TPE	Chang Kai-chen	108	5
GBR	Heather Watson	119	6
RUS	Anna Blinkova	122	7
GBR	Naomi Broady	123	8

- ^{1} Rankings as of 29 May 2017.

=== Other entrants ===
The following player received a wildcard into the singles main draw:

- (United Kingdom) Katie Boulter
- (United Kingdom) Harriet Dart
- (United Kingdom) Katy Dunne
- (United Kingdom) Gabriella Taylor

The following players received entry into the singles main draw using protected rankings:

- (Kazakhstan) Zarina Diyas
- (Croatia) Jana Fett
- (Slovakia) Magdaléna Rybáriková

The following players received entry from the qualifying draw:

- (Poland) Paula Kania
- (United States) Danielle Lao
- (Czech Republic) Karolína Muchová
- (Ukraine) Dayana Yastremska

== Champions ==
=== Men's singles ===
- (Japan) Yūichi Sugita def. (Australia) Jordan Thompson 7–6^{(9–7)}, 7–6^{(10–8)}.

=== Women's singles ===
- (Slovakia) Magdaléna Rybáriková def. (United Kingdom) Heather Watson, 6–4, 7–5

=== Men's doubles ===
- (New Zealand) Marcus Daniell / (Pakistan) Aisam-ul-Haq Qureshi def. (Philippines) Treat Huey / (United States) Denis Kudla 6–3, 7–6^{(7–0)}.

=== Women's doubles ===
- (Australia) Monique Adamczak / (Australia) Storm Sanders def. (Chinese Taipei) Chang Kai-chen / (New Zealand) Marina Erakovic, 7–5, 6–4
