= 2022 Surbiton Trophy – Men's doubles =

Men's doubles
- 2022 Surbiton Trophy

Final
- Champions: (United Kingdom) Julian Cash (United Kingdom) Henry Patten
- Runners-up: (Kazakhstan) Aleksandr Nedovyesov (Pakistan) Aisam-ul-Haq Qureshi
- Score: 4–6, 6–3, [11–9]

Events
Singles	men	women
Doubles	men	women
- Surbiton Trophy

Marcel Granollers and Ben McLachlan were the defending champions but chose not to defend their title.

Julian Cash and Henry Patten won the title after defeating Aleksandr Nedovyesov and Aisam-ul-Haq Qureshi 4–6, 6–3, [11–9] in the final.

== Seeds ==
1. (United Kingdom) Jamie Murray / (Slovakia) Filip Polášek (first round)
2. (Australia) Thanasi Kokkinakis / (Australia) Luke Saville (withdrew)
3. (Kazakhstan) Aleksandr Nedovyesov / (Pakistan) Aisam-ul-Haq Qureshi (final)
4. (India) Ramkumar Ramanathan / (Australia) John-Patrick Smith (quarterfinals)

== Draw ==
Key

- Q = Qualifier
- WC = Wild card
- LL = Lucky loser
- Alt = Alternate
- ITF = ITF entry
- PR = Protected ranking
- SR = Special ranking
- SE = Special exempt
- JE = Junior exempt
- JR = Junior Accelerator Programme entrant
- CO = College Accelerator Programme entrant
- NG = Next Gen Accelerator Program entrant
- w/o = Walkover
- r = Retired
- d = Defaulted

First round
1	(United Kingdom) J Murray (Slovakia) F Polášek	6	6^{7}	[7]
(India) D Sharan (New Zealand) A Sitak	2	7^{9}	[10]
(France) A Hoang (Switzerland) M-A Hüsler	6	6
(United States) J Cerretani (Germany) H Jebens	3	4
3	(Kazakhstan) A Nedovyesov (Pakistan) A-u-H Qureshi	6	6
WC	(United Kingdom) C Broom (United Kingdom) A McHugh	3	4
(United States) N Monroe (United Kingdom) K Skupski	4	6^{7}
(United States) B Nakashima (Australia) A Popyrin	6	7^{9}
(United States) S Kozlov (United States) D Kudla	4	2
WC	(United Kingdom) J Cash (United Kingdom) H Patten	6	6
(Moldova) R Albot (Romania) VV Cornea
4	(India) R Ramanathan (Australia) J-P Smith	w/o
(United Kingdom) A Gray (United Kingdom) R Peniston	3	6^{3}
(United Kingdom) L Broady (United Kingdom) J Clarke	6	7^{7}
Alt	(Switzerland) A Bellier (United Kingdom) B Harris	7^{12}	6
Alt	(United Kingdom) Oscar Weightman (United Kingdom) H Wendelken	6^{10}	4

Quarterfinals
(India) D Sharan (New Zealand) A Sitak	6	6^{2}	[10]
(France) A Hoang (Switzerland) M-A Hüsler	2	7^{7}	[5]
3	(Kazakhstan) A Nedovyesov (Pakistan) A-u-H Qureshi	6	6
(United States) B Nakashima (Australia) A Popyrin	3	4
WC	(United Kingdom) J Cash (United Kingdom) H Patten	7^{7}	7^{7}
4	(India) R Ramanathan (Australia) J-P Smith	6^{2}	6^{4}
(United Kingdom) L Broady (United Kingdom) J Clarke	2	7^{8}	[4]
Alt	(Switzerland) A Bellier (United Kingdom) B Harris	6	6^{6}	[10]

Semifinals
(India) D Sharan (New Zealand) A Sitak	5	3
3	(Kazakhstan) A Nedovyesov (Pakistan) A-u-H Qureshi	7	6
WC	(United Kingdom) J Cash (United Kingdom) H Patten	6	6
Alt	(Switzerland) A Bellier (United Kingdom) B Harris	3	3

Final
3	(Kazakhstan) A Nedovyesov (Pakistan) A-u-H Qureshi	6	3	[9]
WC	(United Kingdom) J Cash (United Kingdom) H Patten	4	6	[11]
