= 2023 Wimbledon Championships – Men's doubles =

Men's doubles
- 2023 Wimbledon Championships

Final
- Champions: (Netherlands) Wesley Koolhof (United Kingdom) Neal Skupski
- Runners-up: (Spain) Marcel Granollers (Argentina) Horacio Zeballos
- Score: 6–4, 6–4

Events
Singles	men	women		boys	girls
Doubles	men	women	mixed	boys	girls
WC Singles	men	women	quad
WC Doubles	men	women	quad
14&U Singles	boys	girls
Legends	men	women	mixed
- Wimbledon Championships

Wesley Koolhof and Neal Skupski defeated Marcel Granollers and Horacio Zeballos in the final, 6–4, 6–4 to win the men's doubles tennis title at the 2023 Wimbledon Championships. It was both players' first major title in men's doubles.

Matthew Ebden and Max Purcell were the defending champions, but chose not to defend the title together. Ebden partnered Rohan Bopanna and Purcell partnered Jordan Thompson, but both lost to Koolhof and Skupski in the semifinals and in the third round, respectively.

This marks the first year that men's doubles were played in best-of-three sets instead of best-of-five.

Koolhof and Skupski regained the men's doubles No. 1 ranking at the end of the tournament, after current No. 1 Austin Krajicek lost in the second round. Rajeev Ram was also in contention for the No. 1 ranking at the beginning of the tournament.

== Seeds ==
1. (Netherlands) Wesley Koolhof / (United Kingdom) Neal Skupski (champions)
2. (Croatia) Ivan Dodig / (United States) Austin Krajicek (second round)
3. (United States) Rajeev Ram / (United Kingdom) Joe Salisbury (first round)
4. (Monaco) Hugo Nys / (Poland) Jan Zieliński (third round)
5. (Mexico) Santiago González / (France) Édouard Roger-Vasselin (third round)
6. (India) Rohan Bopanna / (Australia) Matthew Ebden (semifinals)
7. (El Salvador) Marcelo Arévalo / (Netherlands) Jean-Julien Rojer (second round)
8. (France) Fabrice Martin / (Germany) Andreas Mies (second round)
9. (Croatia) Nikola Mektić / (Croatia) Mate Pavić (third round)
10. (Germany) Kevin Krawietz / (Germany) Tim Pütz (semifinals)
11. (United Kingdom) Lloyd Glasspool / (France) Nicolas Mahut (second round)
12. (Belgium) Sander Gillé / (Belgium) Joran Vliegen (third round)
13. (United Kingdom) Jamie Murray / (New Zealand) Michael Venus (quarterfinals)
14. (Argentina) Máximo González / (Argentina) Andrés Molteni (second round)
15. (Spain) Marcel Granollers / (Argentina) Horacio Zeballos (final)
16. (Brazil) Marcelo Melo / (Australia) John Peers (third round)

Click on the seed number of a player to go to their draw section.

== Draw ==
Key

- Q = Qualifier
- WC = Wild card
- LL = Lucky loser
- Alt = Alternate
- ITF = ITF entry
- PR = Protected ranking
- SR = Special ranking
- SE = Special exempt
- JE = Junior exempt
- JR = Junior Accelerator Programme entrant
- CO = College Accelerator Programme entrant
- NG = Next Gen Accelerator Program entrant
- w/o = Walkover
- r = Retired
- d = Defaulted

=== Finals ===
Quarterfinals
1	(Netherlands) Wesley Koolhof (United Kingdom) Neal Skupski	4	6	6
(Uruguay) Ariel Behar (Czech Republic) Adam Pavlásek	6	2	3
Alt	(Netherlands) Tallon Griekspoor (Netherlands) Bart Stevens	7^{7}	5	2
6	(India) Rohan Bopanna (Australia) Matthew Ebden	6^{3}	7	6
10	(Germany) Kevin Krawietz (Germany) Tim Pütz	6	6
13	(United Kingdom) Jamie Murray (New Zealand) Michael Venus	4	3
(United States) Nathaniel Lammons (United States) Jackson Withrow	4	5
15	(Spain) Marcel Granollers (Argentina) Horacio Zeballos	6	7

Semifinals
1	(Netherlands) Wesley Koolhof (United Kingdom) Neal Skupski	7	6
6	(India) Rohan Bopanna (Australia) Matthew Ebden	5	4
10	(Germany) Kevin Krawietz (Germany) Tim Pütz	4	3
15	(Spain) Marcel Granollers (Argentina) Horacio Zeballos	6	6

Final
1	(Netherlands) Wesley Koolhof (United Kingdom) Neal Skupski	6	6
15	(Spain) Marcel Granollers (Argentina) Horacio Zeballos	4	4

=== Top half ===
==== Section 1 ====
First round
1	(Netherlands) W Koolhof (United Kingdom) N Skupski	6	7
(Germany) D Altmaier; A Karatsev	3	5
(Australia) R Hijikata (Australia) J Kubler	6	6
Alt	(Italy) M Cecchinato (Brazil) T Monteiro	2	2
WC	(United States) J Isner (United States) J Sock	5	4
(Australia) M Purcell (Australia) J Thompson	7	6
WC	(United Kingdom) J Cash (United Kingdom) L Johnson	7	4	3
14	(Argentina) M González (Argentina) A Molteni	5	6	6
9	(Croatia) N Mektić (Croatia) M Pavić	7^{7}	6
(Brazil) M Demoliner (Netherlands) M Middelkoop	6^{5}	4
WC	(United Kingdom) L Broady (United Kingdom) J O'Mara	5	4
(Portugal) F Cabral (Brazil) R Matos	7	6
(Uruguay) A Behar (Czech Republic) A Pavlásek	6	7^{7}
(Argentina) G Andreozzi (Argentina) F Cerúndolo	1	6^{5}
PR	(France) J Chardy (France) U Humbert	5	5
8	(France) F Martin (Germany) A Mies	7	7

Second round
1	(Netherlands) W Koolhof (United Kingdom) N Skupski	7^{7}	6
(Australia) R Hijikata (Australia) J Kubler	6^{3}	2
(Australia) M Purcell (Australia) J Thompson	6	5	6
14	(Argentina) M González (Argentina) A Molteni	4	7	4
9	(Croatia) N Mektić (Croatia) M Pavić	7	7^{7}
(Portugal) F Cabral (Brazil) R Matos	5	6^{3}
(Uruguay) A Behar (Czech Republic) A Pavlásek	7^{7}	6
8	(France) F Martin (Germany) A Mies	6^{3}	1

Third round
1	(Netherlands) W Koolhof (United Kingdom) N Skupski	6	7^{7}
(Australia) M Purcell (Australia) J Thompson	3	6^{3}
9	(Croatia) N Mektić (Croatia) M Pavić	4	6	5
(Uruguay) A Behar (Czech Republic) A Pavlásek	6	3	7

Quarterfinals
1	(Netherlands) W Koolhof (United Kingdom) N Skupski	4	6	6
(Uruguay) A Behar (Czech Republic) A Pavlásek	6	2	3

==== Section 2 ====
First round
3	(United States) R Ram (United Kingdom) J Salisbury	7^{7}	3	4
Alt	(Netherlands) T Griekspoor (Netherlands) B Stevens	6^{5}	6	6
(Ecuador) G Escobar (Kazakhstan) A Nedovyesov	4	6^{7}
(Italy) S Bolelli (Italy) A Vavassori	6	7^{9}
(United States) C Eubanks (United States) JJ Wolf	4	2
(France) S Doumbia (France) F Reboul	6	6
(Netherlands) R Haase (Austria) P Oswald	7^{7}	4	4
16	(Brazil) M Melo (Australia) J Peers	6^{4}	6	6
11	(United Kingdom) L Glasspool (France) N Mahut	6	7^{7}
(United States) M Cressy (Kazakhstan) A Golubev	4	6^{4}
Alt	(Netherlands) D Pel (United States) R Stalder	6	6
Alt	(France) C Lestienne (France) C Moutet	3	2
WC	(United Kingdom) J Fearnley (United Kingdom) J Monday	1	7^{7}	6
(Sweden) A Göransson (Japan) B McLachlan	6	6^{2}	4
(Argentina) G Durán (Argentina) TM Etcheverry	2	7^{7}	6^{8}
6	(India) R Bopanna (Australia) M Ebden	6	6^{5}	7^{10}

Second round
Alt	(Netherlands) T Griekspoor (Netherlands) B Stevens	2	7^{7}	7^{10}
(Italy) S Bolelli (Italy) A Vavassori	6	6^{2}	6^{7}
(France) S Doumbia (France) F Reboul	3	2
16	(Brazil) M Melo (Australia) J Peers	6	6
11	(United Kingdom) L Glasspool (France) N Mahut	6	3	6^{7}
Alt	(Netherlands) D Pel (United States) R Stalder	4	6	7^{10}
WC	(United Kingdom) J Fearnley (United Kingdom) J Monday	5	3
6	(India) R Bopanna (Australia) M Ebden	7	6

Third round
Alt	(Netherlands) T Griekspoor (Netherlands) B Stevens	7	6
16	(Brazil) M Melo (Australia) J Peers	5	4
Alt	(Netherlands) D Pel (United States) R Stalder	5	6	6^{5}
6	(India) R Bopanna (Australia) M Ebden	7	4	7^{10}

Quarterfinals
Alt	(Netherlands) T Griekspoor (Netherlands) B Stevens	7^{7}	5	2
6	(India) R Bopanna (Australia) M Ebden	6^{3}	7	6

=== Bottom half ===
==== Section 3 ====
First round
5	(Mexico) S González (France) É Roger-Vasselin	3	6	7^{10}
Alt	(France) G Barrère (France) Q Halys	6	3	6^{5}
(Argentina) P Cachin (Germany) Y Hanfmann	5	3
WC	(United Kingdom) T Samuel (United Kingdom) C Thomson	7	6
(Spain) R Carballés Baena (Colombia) DE Galán	3	2
(United States) W Blumberg (Norway) C Ruud	6	6
(Serbia) N Ćaćić (Mexico) MÁ Reyes-Varela	5	3
10	(Germany) K Krawietz (Germany) T Pütz	7	6
13	(United Kingdom) J Murray (New Zealand) M Venus	6	3	6
(France) A Olivetti (Spain) D Vega Hernández	4	6	4
(Austria) A Erler (Austria) L Miedler	6	6
PR	(France) P-H Herbert (France) A Rinderknech	4	4
Alt	(India) Y Bhambri (India) S Myneni	4	6	4
(Spain) A Davidovich Fokina (France) A Mannarino	6	4	6
(United States) M McDonald (United States) B Shelton	3	4
4	(Monaco) H Nys (Poland) J Zieliński	6	6

Second round
5	(Mexico) S González (France) É Roger-Vasselin	6	7^{7}
WC	(United Kingdom) T Samuel (United Kingdom) C Thomson	3	6^{4}
(United States) W Blumberg (Norway) C Ruud
10	(Germany) K Krawietz (Germany) T Pütz	w/o
13	(United Kingdom) J Murray (New Zealand) M Venus	6^{5}	7^{7}	6
(Austria) A Erler (Austria) L Miedler	7^{7}	6^{3}	3
(Spain) A Davidovich Fokina (France) A Mannarino	6^{3}	4
4	(Monaco) H Nys (Poland) J Zieliński	7^{7}	6

Third round
5	(Mexico) S González (France) É Roger-Vasselin	4	6	3
10	(Germany) K Krawietz (Germany) T Pütz	6	3	6
13	(United Kingdom) J Murray (New Zealand) M Venus	6	6
4	(Monaco) H Nys (Poland) J Zieliński	4	3

Quarterfinals
10	(Germany) K Krawietz (Germany) T Pütz	6	6
13	(United Kingdom) J Murray (New Zealand) M Venus	4	3

==== Section 4 ====
First round
7	(El Salvador) M Arévalo (Netherlands) J-J Rojer	6	7^{9}
(Switzerland) M-A Hüsler (United States) B Nakashima	4	6^{7}
PR	(Argentina) S Báez (Argentina) G Pella	3	5
(United States) N Lammons (United States) J Withrow	6	7
(Monaco) R Arneodo (Austria) S Weissborn	6	6
PR	(Bolivia) H Dellien (Peru) JP Varillas	3	4
(Serbia) L Djere (Australia) C O'Connell	3	2
12	(Belgium) S Gillé (Belgium) J Vliegen	6	6
15	(Spain) M Granollers (Argentina) H Zeballos	6^{6}	7^{7}	7^{11}
(Colombia) JS Cabal (Colombia) R Farah	7^{8}	6^{2}	6^{9}
(Greece) Pe Tsitsipas (Greece) S Tsitsipas	7^{7}	4	2
(France) A Fils (France) L Van Assche	6^{3}	6	6
PR	(United States) R Galloway (South Africa) L Harris	7	6
(United States) M Giron (Netherlands) B van de Zandschulp	5	2
Alt	(India) S Balaji (India) J Nedunchezhiyan	6^{5}	4
2	(Croatia) I Dodig (United States) A Krajicek	7^{7}	6

Second round
7	(El Salvador) M Arévalo (Netherlands) J-J Rojer	3	6^{5}
(United States) N Lammons (United States) J Withrow	6	7^{7}
(Monaco) R Arneodo (Austria) S Weissborn	6^{5}	4
12	(Belgium) S Gillé (Belgium) J Vliegen	7^{7}	6
15	(Spain) M Granollers (Argentina) H Zeballos	7^{7}	6^{6}	6
(France) A Fils (France) L Van Assche	6^{1}	7^{8}	4
PR	(United States) R Galloway (South Africa) L Harris	6^{5}	7^{7}	6
2	(Croatia) I Dodig (United States) A Krajicek	7^{7}	6^{3}	1

Third round
(United States) N Lammons (United States) J Withrow	6	6
12	(Belgium) S Gillé (Belgium) J Vliegen	3	4
15	(Spain) M Granollers (Argentina) H Zeballos	7^{7}	7^{8}
PR	(United States) R Galloway (South Africa) L Harris	6^{5}	6^{6}

Quarterfinals
(United States) N Lammons (United States) J Withrow	4	5
15	(Spain) M Granollers (Argentina) H Zeballos	6	7

== Seeded teams ==
The following are the seeded teams. Seedings are based on ATP rankings as of 26 June 2023.

Country	Player	Country	Player	Rank	Seed
NED	Wesley Koolhof	GBR	Neal Skupski	4	1
CRO	Ivan Dodig	USA	Austin Krajicek	5	2
USA	Rajeev Ram	GBR	Joe Salisbury	11	3
MON	Hugo Nys	POL	Jan Zieliński	19	4
MEX	Santiago González	FRA	Édouard Roger-Vasselin	23	5
IND	Rohan Bopanna	AUS	Matthew Ebden	27	6
ESA	Marcelo Arévalo	NED	Jean-Julien Rojer	28	7
FRA	Fabrice Martin	GER	Andreas Mies	39	8
CRO	Nikola Mektić	CRO	Mate Pavić	44	9
GER	Kevin Krawietz	GER	Tim Pütz	46	10
GBR	Lloyd Glasspool	FRA	Nicolas Mahut	49	11
BEL	Sander Gillé	BEL	Joran Vliegen	49	12
GBR	Jamie Murray	NZL	Michael Venus	51	13
ARG	Máximo González	ARG	Andrés Molteni	53	14
ESP	Marcel Granollers	ARG	Horacio Zeballos	56	15
BRA	Marcelo Melo	AUS	John Peers	63	16

== Other entry information ==
=== Wildcards ===
- (United Kingdom) Liam Broady / (United Kingdom) Jonny O'Mara
- (United Kingdom) Julian Cash / (United Kingdom) Luke Johnson
- (United Kingdom) Jacob Fearnley / (United Kingdom) Johannus Monday
- (United States) John Isner / (United States) Jack Sock
- ~~(United States) Tommy Paul / (United States) Frances Tiafoe~~
- (United Kingdom) Toby Samuel / (United Kingdom) Connor Thomson

=== Protected ranking ===
- (Argentina) Sebastián Báez / (Argentina) Guido Pella
- (France) Jérémy Chardy / (France) Ugo Humbert
- (Bolivia) Hugo Dellien / (Peru) Juan Pablo Varillas
- (United States) Robert Galloway / (South Africa) Lloyd Harris
- (France) Pierre-Hugues Herbert / (France) Arthur Rinderknech

=== Alternates ===
- (India) Sriram Balaji / (India) Jeevan Nedunchezhiyan
- (France) Grégoire Barrère / (France) Quentin Halys
- (India) Yuki Bhambri / (India) Saketh Myneni
- (Italy) Marco Cecchinato / (Brazil) Thiago Monteiro
- (Netherlands) Tallon Griekspoor / (Netherlands) Bart Stevens
- (France) Constant Lestienne / (France) Corentin Moutet
- (Netherlands) David Pel / (United States) Reese Stalder

=== Withdrawals ===
- (Colombia) Nicolás Barrientos / (Portugal) Nuno Borges → replaced by (Netherlands) David Pel / (United States) Reese Stalder
- (Romania) Victor Vlad Cornea / (Serbia) Dušan Lajović → replaced by (France) Grégoire Barrère / (France) Quentin Halys
- (Germany) Hendrik Jebens / (Germany) Jan-Lennard Struff → replaced by (India) Sriram Balaji / (India) Jeevan Nedunchezhiyan
- (Australia) Thanasi Kokkinakis / (Australia) Nick Kyrgios → replaced by (Netherlands) Tallon Griekspoor / (Netherlands) Bart Stevens
- (United States) Tommy Paul / (United States) Frances Tiafoe → replaced by (Italy) Marco Cecchinato / (Brazil) Thiago Monteiro
- (Spain) Albert Ramos Viñolas / (Spain) Bernabé Zapata Miralles → replaced by (France) Constant Lestienne / (France) Corentin Moutet
- (China) Wu Yibing / (China) Zhang Zhizhen → replaced by (India) Yuki Bhambri / (India) Saketh Myneni

Preceded by 2023 French Open – Men's doubles	Grand Slam men's doubles	Succeeded by 2023 US Open – Men's doubles
