= 2023 Surbiton Trophy =

Tennis tournament

- Date: 5–11 June 2023
- Edition: 18th (men); 19th (women)
- Category: ATP Challenger Tour; ITF Women's World Tennis Tour
- Surface: Grass / Outdoor
- Location: Surbiton, United Kingdom

Champions

Men's singles
- (United Kingdom) Andy Murray

Women's singles
- (Belgium) Yanina Wickmayer

Men's doubles
- (United Kingdom) Liam Broady / (United Kingdom) Jonny O'Mara

Women's doubles
- (United States) Sophie Chang / (Belgium) Yanina Wickmayer
← 2022 ·	Surbiton Trophy	· 2024 →

The 2023 Surbiton Trophy was a professional tennis tournament played on outdoor grass. It was the 18th edition for men and 19th for women, which were respectively part of the 2023 ATP Challenger Tour and the 2023 ITF Women's World Tennis Tour. It took place in Surbiton, United Kingdom between 5 and 11 June 2023.

== Champions ==
=== Men's singles ===
- (United Kingdom) Andy Murray def. (Austria) Jurij Rodionov 6–3, 6–2.

=== Men's doubles ===
- (United Kingdom) Liam Broady / (United Kingdom) Jonny O'Mara def. (Australia) Alexei Popyrin / (Australia) Aleksandar Vukic 6–4, 5–7, [10–8].

=== Women's singles ===
- (Belgium) Yanina Wickmayer def. (United Kingdom) Katie Swan 2–6, 6–4, 7–6^{(7–1)}.

=== Women's doubles ===
- (United States) Sophie Chang / (Belgium) Yanina Wickmayer def. (United Kingdom) Alicia Barnett / (United Kingdom) Olivia Nicholls 6–4, 6–1.

== Men's singles main draw entrants ==
=== Seeds ===
Country	Player	Rank^{1}	Seed
GBR	Dan Evans	25	1
GBR	Andy Murray	43	2
USA	Mackenzie McDonald	59	3
~~AUS~~	~~Max Purcell~~	~~68~~	~~4~~
AUS	Jason Kubler	69	5
FRA	Constant Lestienne	70	6
	Ilya Ivashka	73	7
USA	Christopher Eubanks	74	8

- ^{1} Rankings are as of 29 May 2023.

=== Other entrants ===
The following players received wildcards into the singles main draw:

- (United Kingdom) Dan Evans
- (United Kingdom) Andy Murray
- (United Kingdom) Ryan Peniston

The following players received entry into the singles main draw using protected rankings:

- (South Korea) Chung Hyeon
- (Czech Republic) Jiří Veselý

The following player received entry into the singles main draw as an alternate:

- (Canada) Gabriel Diallo

The following players received entry from the qualifying draw:

- (China) Bu Yunchaokete
- (United Kingdom) Daniel Cox
- (United Kingdom) Billy Harris
- (Australia) Luke Saville
- (United Kingdom) Harry Wendelken
- (United Kingdom) Mark Whitehouse

The following players received entry as lucky losers:

- (Australia) James McCabe
- (United States) Zachary Svajda

== Women's singles main draw entrants ==
=== Seeds ===
Country	Player	Rank^{1}	Seed
GER	Tatjana Maria	67	1
USA	Alison Riske-Amritraj	85	2
USA	Madison Brengle	95	3
AUS	Kimberly Birrell	110	4
GBR	Jodie Burrage	111	5
USA	Elizabeth Mandlik	119	6
FRA	Océane Dodin	122	7
GBR	Katie Boulter	125	8

- ^{1} Rankings are as of 29 May 2023.

=== Other entrants ===
The following players received wildcards into the singles main draw:

- (United Kingdom) Naiktha Bains
- (United Kingdom) Sonay Kartal
- (United Kingdom) Yuriko Miyazaki
- (United Kingdom) Eden Silva

The following players received entry from the qualifying draw:

- (Australia) Maddison Inglis
- (Belgium) Magali Kempen
- (United Kingdom) Isabelle Lacy
- (United Kingdom) Maia Lumsden
- (France) Carole Monnet
- (Turkey) Zeynep Sönmez
- (United Kingdom) Emily Webley-Smith
- (Belgium) Yanina Wickmayer
