= Surbiton Trophy =

Grass court tennis tournament in England

Tournament information
- Event name: Surbiton Trophy
- Location: Surbiton, United Kingdom
- Venue: Surbiton Racket and Fitness Club
- Category: ATP Challenger Tour 125; ITF Women's Circuit
- Surface: Grass
- Draw: 32S / 32Q / 16D
- Prize money: €42,500 (ATP 2019), $100,000 (WTA 2019)
- Website: lta.org.uk/surbiton-trophy

Current champions (2024)
- Men's singles: (South Africa) Lloyd Harris
- Women's singles: (Belgium) Alison Van Uytvanck
- Men's doubles: (United Kingdom) Julian Cash (United States) Robert Galloway
- Women's doubles: (United States) Emina Bektas (Serbia) Aleksandra Krunic

The Surbiton Trophy was a tennis tournament for male and female professional players played on grass courts. The event was held annually in Surbiton, England, from 1997 through 2008 as part of the ATP Challenger Series and ITF Women's Circuit. In 2009, it was replaced by the Aegon Trophy in Nottingham. In 2015, the event resumed on both the ATP Challenger Tour and ITF Women's Circuit. It was the successor tournament to the Surrey Championships (1890–1981) also played at the same venue and location. The mixed event came to an end in 2024.

The tournament was not held in 2020 and 2021 because of the COVID-19 pandemic, but returned in 2022.

Jim Thomas is the doubles record holder with four titles, while Kristina Brandi is the singles record holder with three titles, including back to back wins.

As of 2023, Yanina Wickmayer became the first person to win both the singles and doubles titles in the same year.

== Past finals ==
=== Men's singles ===
Year	Champion	Runner-up	Score
2024	(South Africa) Lloyd Harris	(Switzerland) Leandro Riedi	7–6^{(10–8)}, 7–5
2023	(United Kingdom) Andy Murray	(Austria) Jurij Rodionov	6–3, 6–2
2022	(Australia) Jordan Thompson	(United States) Denis Kudla	7–5, 6–3
2021– 2020	Tournaments cancelled due to the COVID-19 pandemic		
2019	(United Kingdom) Dan Evans	(Serbia) Viktor Troicki	6–2, 6–3
2018	(France) Jérémy Chardy	(Australia) Alex de Minaur	6–4, 4–6, 6–2
2017	(Japan) Yūichi Sugita	(Australia) Jordan Thompson	7–6^{(9–7)}, 7–6^{(10–8)}
2016	(Chinese Taipei) Lu Yen-hsun	(Romania) Marius Copil	7–5, 7–6^{(13–11)}
2015	(Australia) Matthew Ebden	(United States) Denis Kudla	6–7^{(4–7)}, 6–4, 7–6^{(7–5)}
2014– 2009	Not held		
2008	(Canada) Frank Dancevic	(South Africa) Kevin Anderson	4–6, 6–3, 7–6^{(7–4)}
2007	(France) Jo-Wilfried Tsonga	(Croatia) Ivo Karlović	6–3, 7–6^{(7–4)}
2006	(United States) Mardy Fish	(South Africa) Wesley Moodie	6–2, 7–6^{(7–1)}
2005	(Italy) Daniele Bracciali	(Croatia) Ivo Karlović	6–7^{(0–7)}, 7–6^{(7–5)}, 7–6^{(7–4)}
2004	(Slovakia) Karol Beck	(South Africa) Wesley Moodie	6–4, 6–4
2003	(South Africa) Wesley Moodie	(United Kingdom) Alex Bogdanovic	6–4, 6–7^{(2–7)}, 6–1
2002	(United States) Jeff Morrison	(South Africa) Wesley Moodie	7–6^{(7–4)}, 5–7, 7–6^{(7–4)}
2001	(United States) Taylor Dent	(South Africa) Neville Godwin	4–6, 7–6^{(7–3)}, 6–2
2000	(Australia) Wayne Arthurs	(Italy) Laurence Tieleman	4–6, 7–6^{(8–6)}, 6–4
1999	(Armenia) Sargis Sargsian	(Czech Republic) Martin Damm	7–6^{(11–9)}, 7–5
1998	(Italy) Gianluca Pozzi	(Zimbabwe) Kevin Ullyett	6–4, 6–3

=== Men's doubles ===
Year	Champions	Runners-up	Score
2024	(United Kingdom) Julian Cash (United States) Robert Galloway	(Colombia) Nicolás Barrientos (Ecuador) Diego Hidalgo	6–4, 6–4
2023	(United Kingdom) Liam Broady (United Kingdom) Jonny O'Mara	(Australia) Alexei Popyrin (Australia) Aleksandar Vukic	6–4, 5–7, [10–8]
2022	(United Kingdom) Julian Cash (United Kingdom) Henry Patten	(Kazakhstan) Aleksandr Nedovyesov (Pakistan) Aisam-ul-Haq Qureshi	4–6, 6–3, [11–9]
2021– 2020	Tournaments cancelled due to the COVID-19 pandemic		
2019	(Spain) Marcel Granollers (Japan) Ben McLachlan	(South Korea) Kwon Soon-woo (India) Ramkumar Ramanathan	4–6, 6–3, [10–2]
2018	(United Kingdom) Luke Bambridge (United Kingdom) Jonny O'Mara	(United Kingdom) Ken Skupski (United Kingdom) Neal Skupski	7–6^{(13–11)}, 4–6, [10–7]
2017	(New Zealand) Marcus Daniell (Pakistan) Aisam-ul-Haq Qureshi	(Philippines) Treat Huey (United States) Denis Kudla	6–3, 7–6^{(7–0)}
2016	(India) Purav Raja (India) Divij Sharan	(United Kingdom) Ken Skupski (United Kingdom) Neal Skupski	6–4, 7–6^{(7–3)}
2015	(United Kingdom) Ken Skupski (United Kingdom) Neal Skupski	(New Zealand) Marcus Daniell (Brazil) Marcelo Demoliner	6–3, 6–4
2014– 2009	Not held		
2008	(France) Arnaud Clément (France) Édouard Roger-Vasselin	(Israel) Harel Levy (United States) Jim Thomas	7–6^{(7–4)}, 6–7^{(3–7)}, [10–7]
2007	(United States) Alex Kuznetsov (Germany) Mischa Zverev	(United Kingdom) James Auckland (Australia) Stephen Huss	2–6, 6–3, [10–6]
2006	(Australia) Jordan Kerr (2) (United States) Jim Thomas (4)	(Australia) Wayne Arthurs (Australia) Chris Guccione	6–2, 6–4
2005	(Australia) Jordan Kerr (1) (United States) Jim Thomas (3)	(United Kingdom) Richard Barker (United Kingdom) William Barker	6–2, 6–4
2004	(Australia) Nathan Healey (United States) Jim Thomas (2)	(Colombia) Alejandro Falla (United States) Glenn Weiner	6–3, 7–6^{(11–9)}
2003	(Australia) Joshua Eagle (Australia) Andrew Kratzmann	(France) Jean-François Bachelot (France) Gregory Carraz	6–3, 6–2
2002	(Brazil) André Sá (United States) Jim Thomas (1)	(South Africa) David Adams (Australia) Joshua Eagle	7–5, 2–6, 6–3
2001	(South Africa) David Adams (Australia) Ben Ellwood	(South Africa) Jeff Coetzee (South Africa) Marcos Ondruska	7–6^{(7–5)}, 6–4
2000	(South Africa) Jeff Coetzee (South Africa) Marcos Ondruska	(United States) Jared Palmer (United States) Jonathan Stark	7–6^{(7–3)}, 7–6^{(8–6)}
1999	(Australia) Scott Draper (Australia) Todd Woodbridge	(United States) Justin Gimelstob (United States) Scott Humphries	walkover
1998	(Australia) Sandon Stolle (Australia) Peter Tramacchi	(The Bahamas) Mark Merklein (United States) Michael Sell	4–6, 7–6^{(7–3)}, 6–4

=== Women's singles ===
Year	Champion	Runner-up	Score
2024	(Belgium) Alison Van Uytvanck	(Germany) Tatjana Maria	6–7^{(5–7)}, 6–1, 6–2
2023	(Belgium) Yanina Wickmayer	(United Kingdom) Katie Swan	2–6, 6–4, 7–6^{(7–1)}
2022	(Belgium) Alison Van Uytvanck	(Australia) Arina Rodionova	7–6^{(7–3)}, 6–2
2021– 2020	Tournaments cancelled due to the COVID-19 pandemic		
2019	(United States) Alison Riske (2)	(Slovakia) Magdaléna Rybáriková	6–7^{(5–7)}, 6–2, 6–2
2018	(United States) Alison Riske (1)	(Switzerland) Conny Perrin	6–2, 6–4
2017	(Slovakia) Magdaléna Rybáriková	(United Kingdom) Heather Watson	6–4, 7–5
2016	(Russia) Marina Melnikova	(France) Stéphanie Foretz	6–3, 7–6^{(8–6)}
2015	(Russia) Vitalia Diatchenko	(Japan) Naomi Osaka	7–6^{(7–5)}, 6–0
2014– 2009	Not held		
2008	(New Zealand) Marina Erakovic	(United Kingdom) Anne Keothavong	6–4, 6–2
2007	(Netherlands) Brenda Schultz-McCarthy	(Japan) Ayumi Morita	4–6, 6–4, 7–6^{(7–5)}
2006	(Puerto Rico) Kristina Brandi (3)	(United States) Laura Granville	7–5, 6–0
2005	(Puerto Rico) Kristina Brandi (2)	(United States) Laura Granville	6–3, 6–1
2004	(Japan) Akiko Morigami	(Russia) Anna Chakvetadze	6–4, 1–6, 6–1
2003	(Puerto Rico) Kristina Brandi (1)	(South Korea) Cho Yoon-jeong	6–1, 6–3
2002	(Chinese Taipei) Janet Lee	(United States) Laura Granville	4–6, 6–4, 6–4
2001	(Japan) Rika Fujiwara	(United States) Kristina Brandi	6–3, 6–3
2000	(United Kingdom) Louise Latimer	(Thailand) Tamarine Tanasugarn	7–5, 6–3
1999	(Thailand) Tamarine Tanasugarn (2)	(South Africa) Surina de Beer	6–4, 5–7, 6–2
1998	(France) Amélie Cocheteux	(Netherlands) Seda Noorlander	6–2, 6–4
1997	(Thailand) Tamarine Tanasugarn (1)	(Poland) Aleksandra Olsza	5–7, 7–6, 5–0 ret.

=== Women's doubles ===
Year	Champions	Runners-up	Score
2024	(United States) Emina Bektas (Serbia) Aleksandra Krunic	(United Kingdom) Sarah Beth Grey (United Kingdom) Tara Moore	6–1, 6–1
2023	(United States) Sophie Chang (Belgium) Yanina Wickmayer	(United Kingdom) Alicia Barnett (United Kingdom) Olivia Nicholls	6–4, 6–1
2022	(United States) Ingrid Neel (Netherlands) Rosalie van der Hoek	(Mexico) Fernanda Contreras (United States) Catherine Harrison	6–3, 6–3
2021– 2020	Tournaments cancelled due to the COVID-19 pandemic		
2019	(United States) Jennifer Brady (United States) Caroline Dolehide	(United Kingdom) Heather Watson (Belgium) Yanina Wickmayer	6–3, 6–4
2018	(Australia) Jessica Moore (Australia) Ellen Perez	(Australia) Arina Rodionova (Belgium) Yanina Wickmayer	4–6, 7–5, [10–3]
2017	(Australia) Monique Adamczak (Australia) Storm Sanders	(Chinese Taipei) Chang Kai-chen (New Zealand) Marina Erakovic	7–5, 6–4
2016	(United States) Sanaz Marand (United States) Melanie Oudin	(United States) Robin Anderson (Australia) Alison Bai	6–4, 7–5
2015	(Ukraine) Lyudmyla Kichenok (Switzerland) Xenia Knoll	(United Kingdom) Tara Moore (United Kingdom) Nicola Slater	7–6^{(8–6)}, 6–3
2014– 2009	Not held		
2008	(United States) Julie Ditty (United States) Abigail Spears	(United Kingdom) Sarah Borwell (United Kingdom) Elizabeth Thomas	7–6^{(7–2)}, 6–2
2007	(United Kingdom) Karen Paterson (United Kingdom) Melanie South	(United Kingdom) Elena Baltacha (United Kingdom) Naomi Cavaday	6–1, 6–4
2006	(Australia) Casey Dellacqua (Australia) Trudi Musgrave	(Chinese Taipei) Hsieh Su-wei (Thailand) Tamarine Tanasugarn	6–3, 6–3
2005	(Japan) Rika Fujiwara (Japan) Saori Obata	(United States) Jennifer Hopkins (United States) Mashona Washington	4–6, 6–4, 6–2
2004	(New Zealand) Leanne Baker (Australia) Nicole Sewell	(South Africa) Surina de Beer (Republic of Ireland) Karen Nugent	2–6, 7–5, 7–6^{(8–6)}
2003	(Japan) Shinobu Asagoe (Japan) Nana Miyagi	(United States) Bethanie Mattek (United States) Lilia Osterloh	7–6^{(13–11)}, 3–6, 6–4
2002	(United Kingdom) Julie Pullin (United Kingdom) Lorna Woodroffe	(South Africa) Esmé de Villiers (Kazakhstan) Irina Selyutina	6–2, 6–2
2001	(United Kingdom) Julie Pullin (United Kingdom) Lorna Woodroffe	(South Africa) Kim Grant (United States) Lilia Osterloh	7–6^{(7–3)}, 7–5
2000	(Australia) Trudi Musgrave (Australia) Bryanne Stewart	(France) Caroline Dhenin (Italy) Francesca Lubiani	3–6, 6–3, 6–1
1999	(Japan) Rika Hiraki / (United States) Linda Wild vs. (United Kingdom) Julie Pullin / (United Kingdom) Lorna Woodroffe		not played
1998	Doubles competition cancelled		
1997	(Australia) Catherine Barclay (Australia) Kerry-Anne Guse	(United States) Debbie Graham (Australia) Kristine Kunce	3–6, 6–4, 7–6

== See also ==
- List of tennis tournaments
