= 2019 ITF Women's World Tennis Tour (April–June) =

The 2019 ITF Women's World Tennis Tour is the 2019 edition of the second tier tour for women's professional tennis. It is organised by the International Tennis Federation and is a tier below the WTA Tour. The ITF Women's World Tennis Tour includes tournaments with prize money ranging from $15,000 up to $100,000.

== Key ==
Category
W100 tournaments
W80 tournaments
W60 tournaments
W25 tournaments
W15 tournaments

== Month ==
=== April ===
Week of	Tournament	Winner	Runners-up	Semifinalists	Quarterfinalists
April 1	Innisbrook Open; Palm Harbor, United States; Clay; W80; Singles Draw – Doubles Draw	(Czech Republic) Barbora Krejčíková; 6–0, 6–1	(United States) Nicole Gibbs	(Montenegro) Danka Kovinić (Hungary) Panna Udvardy	(Australia) Ellen Perez (Bulgaria) Elitsa Kostova (United States) Whitney Osuigwe (Japan) Kurumi Nara
April 1	Innisbrook Open; Palm Harbor, United States; Clay; W80; Singles Draw – Doubles Draw	(United States) Quinn Gleason (United States) Ingrid Neel; 5–7, 7–5, [10–8]	(Uzbekistan) Akgul Amanmuradova (Australia) Lizette Cabrera	(Montenegro) Danka Kovinić (Hungary) Panna Udvardy	(Australia) Ellen Perez (Bulgaria) Elitsa Kostova (United States) Whitney Osuigwe (Japan) Kurumi Nara
April 1	Pula, Italy; Clay; W25; Singles and Doubles Draws	(Slovenia) Kaja Juvan; 6–1, 3–0, ret.	(Romania) Alexandra Cadanțu	(Germany) Lisa Matviyenko (Switzerland) Jil Teichmann	(Netherlands) Arantxa Rus (Netherlands) Richèl Hogenkamp (Liechtenstein) Kathinka von Deichmann (Russia) Liudmila Samsonova
April 1	Pula, Italy; Clay; W25; Singles and Doubles Draws	(Germany) Katharina Hobgarski (Ukraine) Valeriya Strakhova; 6–2, 6–7^{(4–7)}, [13–11]	(Italy) Giorgia Marchetti (Italy) Camilla Rosatello	(Germany) Lisa Matviyenko (Switzerland) Jil Teichmann	(Netherlands) Arantxa Rus (Netherlands) Richèl Hogenkamp (Liechtenstein) Kathinka von Deichmann (Russia) Liudmila Samsonova
April 1	Kashiwa, Japan; Hard; W25; Singles and Doubles Draws	(Ukraine) Daria Snigur; 6–4, 6–2	(Canada) Rebecca Marino	(Japan) Ayano Shimizu (Chinese Taipei) Chang Kai-chen	(Japan) Haruka Kaji (Netherlands) Noa Liauw a Fong (Japan) Mayo Hibi (South Korea) Han Na-lae
April 1	Kashiwa, Japan; Hard; W25; Singles and Doubles Draws	(Japan) Kanako Morisaki (Japan) Minori Yonehara; 4–6, 6–2, [10–5]	(South Korea) Lee So-ra (Chinese Taipei) Lee Ya-hsuan	(Japan) Ayano Shimizu (Chinese Taipei) Chang Kai-chen	(Japan) Haruka Kaji (Netherlands) Noa Liauw a Fong (Japan) Mayo Hibi (South Korea) Han Na-lae
April 1	Óbidos, Portugal; Carpet; W25; Singles and Doubles Draws	(Belgium) Maryna Zanevska; 7–5, 6–2	(Georgia (country)) Mariam Bolkvadze	(Czech Republic) Barbora Štefková (United Kingdom) Eden Silva	(Spain) Georgina García Pérez (United Kingdom) Katy Dunne (Turkey) Pemra Özgen (Serbia) Dejana Radanović
April 1	Óbidos, Portugal; Carpet; W25; Singles and Doubles Draws	(Spain) Cristina Bucșa (Spain) Georgina García Pérez; 7–5, 7–5	(Georgia (country)) Sofia Shapatava (United Kingdom) Emily Webley-Smith	(Czech Republic) Barbora Štefková (United Kingdom) Eden Silva	(Spain) Georgina García Pérez (United Kingdom) Katy Dunne (Turkey) Pemra Özgen (Serbia) Dejana Radanović
April 1	Bolton, United Kingdom; Hard (indoor); W25; Singles and Doubles Draws	(Russia) Vitalia Diatchenko; 6–2, 6–2	(United Kingdom) Jodie Burrage	(Belgium) Greet Minnen (United Kingdom) Emma Raducanu	(Poland) Maja Chwalińska (Netherlands) Lesley Kerkhove (Bulgaria) Isabella Shinikova (Spain) Paula Badosa Gibert
April 1	Bolton, United Kingdom; Hard (indoor); W25; Singles and Doubles Draws	(United Kingdom) Alicia Barnett (United Kingdom) Jodie Burrage; 6–3, 6–3	(Romania) Laura-Ioana Paar (Belgium) Hélène Scholsen	(Belgium) Greet Minnen (United Kingdom) Emma Raducanu	(Poland) Maja Chwalińska (Netherlands) Lesley Kerkhove (Bulgaria) Isabella Shinikova (Spain) Paula Badosa Gibert
April 1	Jackson, United States; Clay; W25; Singles and Doubles Draws	(Poland) Katarzyna Kawa; 6–3, 6–2	(United States) Ann Li	(Italy) Gaia Sanesi (Belarus) Olga Govortsova	(Chinese Taipei) Lee Hua-chen (United States) Katie Volynets (Slovakia) Tereza Mihalíková (Romania) Gabriela Talabă
April 1	Jackson, United States; Clay; W25; Singles and Doubles Draws	(Poland) Katarzyna Kawa (Poland) Katarzyna Piter; 7–5, 6–1	(United States) Hanna Chang (United States) Caitlin Whoriskey	(Italy) Gaia Sanesi (Belarus) Olga Govortsova	(Chinese Taipei) Lee Hua-chen (United States) Katie Volynets (Slovakia) Tereza Mihalíková (Romania) Gabriela Talabă
April 1	Sharm El Sheikh, Egypt; Hard; W15; Singles and Doubles Draws	(Turkey) İpek Soylu; 7–6^{(7–2)}, 6–4	(Belgium) Magali Kempen	(Thailand) Mananchaya Sawangkaew (Switzerland) Arlinda Rushiti	(Russia) Maria Daniels Sierra (Slovakia) Laura Maluniaková (Japan) Ange Oby Kajuru (Germany) Katharina Hering
April 1	Sharm El Sheikh, Egypt; Hard; W15; Singles and Doubles Draws	(Thailand) Thasaporn Naklo (Thailand) Mananchaya Sawangkaew; 6–3, 7–5	(Kazakhstan) Zhibek Kulambayeva (Slovakia) Katarína Kužmová	(Thailand) Mananchaya Sawangkaew (Switzerland) Arlinda Rushiti	(Russia) Maria Daniels Sierra (Slovakia) Laura Maluniaková (Japan) Ange Oby Kajuru (Germany) Katharina Hering
April 1	Tabarka, Tunisia; Clay; W15; Singles and Doubles Draws	(Italy) Camilla Scala; 6–2, 6–1	(United States) Sarah Lee	(France) Alice Ramé (Belarus) Shalimar Talbi	(Slovenia) Pia Čuk (Bulgaria) Ani Vangelova (Russia) Margarita Lazareva (Hong Kong) Adithya Karunaratne
April 1	Tabarka, Tunisia; Clay; W15; Singles and Doubles Draws	(Spain) Ángela Fita Boluda (France) Alice Ramé; 7–5, 6–7^{(5–7)}, [11–9]	(United States) Sarah Lee (Belgium) Chelsea Vanhoutte	(France) Alice Ramé (Belarus) Shalimar Talbi	(Slovenia) Pia Čuk (Bulgaria) Ani Vangelova (Russia) Margarita Lazareva (Hong Kong) Adithya Karunaratne
April 1	Antalya, Turkey; Clay; W15; Singles and Doubles Draws	(Slovenia) Nika Radišič; 6–3, 4–6, 7–6^{(7–5)}	(Japan) Yuki Naito	(Germany) Lisa Ponomar (Serbia) Draginja Vuković	(Czech Republic) Johana Marková (Russia) Valeriya Urzhumova (Switzerland) Fiona Ganz (Belarus) Katyarina Paulenka
April 1	Antalya, Turkey; Clay; W15; Singles and Doubles Draws	(Russia) Victoria Mikhaylova (Romania) Andreea Prisăcariu; 6–2, 6–4	(Switzerland) Marie Mettraux (Switzerland) Joanne Züger	(Germany) Lisa Ponomar (Serbia) Draginja Vuković	(Czech Republic) Johana Marková (Russia) Valeriya Urzhumova (Switzerland) Fiona Ganz (Belarus) Katyarina Paulenka
April 8	Lale Cup; Istanbul, Turkey; Hard; W60; Singles Draw – Doubles Draw	(Russia) Vitalia Diatchenko; 6–4, 6–0	(India) Ankita Raina	(Slovakia) Jana Čepelová (Czech Republic) Marie Bouzková	(Cyprus) Raluca Șerban (Greece) Valentini Grammatikopoulou (Turkey) Çağla Büyükakçay (Belgium) Greet Minnen
April 8	Lale Cup; Istanbul, Turkey; Hard; W60; Singles Draw – Doubles Draw	(Czech Republic) Marie Bouzková (Netherlands) Rosalie van der Hoek; 7–5, 6–7^{(2–7)}, [10–5]	(Belarus) Ilona Kremen (Belarus) Iryna Shymanovich	(Slovakia) Jana Čepelová (Czech Republic) Marie Bouzková	(Cyprus) Raluca Șerban (Greece) Valentini Grammatikopoulou (Turkey) Çağla Büyükakçay (Belgium) Greet Minnen
April 8	Calvi, France; Hard; W25+H; Singles and Doubles Draws	(Russia) Anastasiya Komardina; 6–3, 6–2	(France) Audrey Albié	(France) Alizé Lim (France) Lou Brouleau	(United Kingdom) Katie Swan (France) Elixane Lechemia (France) Manon Léonard (Spain) Andrea Lázaro García
April 8	Calvi, France; Hard; W25+H; Singles and Doubles Draws	(France) Estelle Cascino (France) Elixane Lechemia; 6–3, 6–2	(Russia) Ekaterina Kazionova (Sweden) Linnéa Malmqvist	(France) Alizé Lim (France) Lou Brouleau	(United Kingdom) Katie Swan (France) Elixane Lechemia (France) Manon Léonard (Spain) Andrea Lázaro García
April 8	Hong Kong; Hard; W25; Singles and Doubles Draws	(China) Ma Shuyue; 4–6, 6–3, 6–2	(Australia) Maddison Inglis	(Japan) Momoko Kobori (Japan) Eri Hozumi	(Australia) Kaylah McPhee (Japan) Mai Hontama (Indonesia) Aldila Sutjiadi (Japan) Chihiro Muramatsu
April 8	Hong Kong; Hard; W25; Singles and Doubles Draws	(New Zealand) Paige Hourigan (Indonesia) Aldila Sutjiadi; 6–3, 6–1	(Australia) Maddison Inglis (Australia) Kaylah McPhee	(Japan) Momoko Kobori (Japan) Eri Hozumi	(Australia) Kaylah McPhee (Japan) Mai Hontama (Indonesia) Aldila Sutjiadi (Japan) Chihiro Muramatsu
April 8	Pula, Italy; Clay; W25; Singles and Doubles Draws	Tournament was cancelled after the completion of the second round due to ongoing poor weather			(Belgium) Kimberley Zimmermann (Croatia) Tena Lukas (United Kingdom) Naiktha Bains (Australia) Jaimee Fourlis (Italy) Tatiana Pieri (Bosnia and Herzegovina) Dea Herdželaš (Romania) Miriam Bulgaru (Spain) Olga Sáez Larra
April 8	Osaka, Japan; Hard; W25; Singles and Doubles Draws	(South Korea) Han Na-lae; 7–5, 3–6, 6–3	(China) Wang Xiyu	(Japan) Mayo Hibi (Japan) Akiko Omae	(China) You Xiaodi (Canada) Rebecca Marino (Chinese Taipei) Joanna Garland (Japan) Erika Sema
April 8	Osaka, Japan; Hard; W25; Singles and Doubles Draws	(South Korea) Choi Ji-hee (South Korea) Han Na-lae; 6–4, 5–7, [10–8]	(Chinese Taipei) Hsu Ching-wen (China) Wang Xiyu	(Japan) Mayo Hibi (Japan) Akiko Omae	(China) You Xiaodi (Canada) Rebecca Marino (Chinese Taipei) Joanna Garland (Japan) Erika Sema
April 8	Óbidos, Portugal; Carpet; W25; Singles and Doubles Draws	(Georgia (country)) Mariam Bolkvadze; 6–2, 7–6^{(7–5)}	(Spain) Nuria Párrizas Díaz	(Georgia (country)) Sofia Shapatava (Spain) Eva Guerrero Álvarez	(Ukraine) Anastasiya Shoshyna (Spain) Cristina Bucșa (Belgium) Maryna Zanevska (Hungary) Dalma Gálfi
April 8	Óbidos, Portugal; Carpet; W25; Singles and Doubles Draws	(Georgia (country)) Sofia Shapatava (United Kingdom) Emily Webley-Smith; 6–1, 2–6, [11–9]	(Georgia (country)) Mariam Bolkvadze (Slovenia) Nastja Kolar	(Georgia (country)) Sofia Shapatava (Spain) Eva Guerrero Álvarez	(Ukraine) Anastasiya Shoshyna (Spain) Cristina Bucșa (Belgium) Maryna Zanevska (Hungary) Dalma Gálfi
April 8	Nana Trophy; Tunis, Tunisia; Clay; W25+H; Singles and Doubles Draws	(Romania) Jaqueline Cristian; 6–4, 6–0	(Chile) Daniela Seguel	(France) Margot Yerolymos (Argentina) Paula Ormaechea	(Belgium) Lara Salden (Russia) Victoria Kan (France) Diane Parry (Spain) Irene Burillo Escorihuela
April 8	Nana Trophy; Tunis, Tunisia; Clay; W25+H; Singles and Doubles Draws	(Italy) Martina Colmegna (Italy) Anastasia Grymalska; 6–4, 6–2	(Romania) Jaqueline Cristian (Romania) Andreea Roșca	(France) Margot Yerolymos (Argentina) Paula Ormaechea	(Belgium) Lara Salden (Russia) Victoria Kan (France) Diane Parry (Spain) Irene Burillo Escorihuela
April 8	Sunderland, United Kingdom; Hard (indoor); W25; Singles and Doubles Draws	(Romania) Laura-Ioana Paar; 7–5, 4–6, 6–2	(United Kingdom) Harriet Dart	(United Kingdom) Tara Moore (United States) Robin Anderson	(Switzerland) Simona Waltert (France) Océane Dodin (Poland) Maja Chwalińska (France) Mallaurie Noël
April 8	Sunderland, United Kingdom; Hard (indoor); W25; Singles and Doubles Draws	(Poland) Maja Chwalińska (Norway) Ulrikke Eikeri; 6–4, 3–6, [11–9]	(United States) Emina Bektas (United Kingdom) Tara Moore	(United Kingdom) Tara Moore (United States) Robin Anderson	(Switzerland) Simona Waltert (France) Océane Dodin (Poland) Maja Chwalińska (France) Mallaurie Noël
April 8	Pelham, United States; Clay; W25; Singles and Doubles Draws	(Czech Republic) Barbora Krejčíková; 6–4, 6–3	(United States) Caroline Dolehide	(United States) Hailey Baptiste (Bulgaria) Sesil Karatantcheva	(United States) Ann Li (Japan) Kurumi Nara (Poland) Katarzyna Kawa (United States) Sophie Chang
April 8	Pelham, United States; Clay; W25; Singles and Doubles Draws	(United States) Usue Maitane Arconada (United States) Caroline Dolehide; 6–3, 6–0	(Romania) Oana Georgeta Simion (Romania) Gabriela Talabă	(United States) Hailey Baptiste (Bulgaria) Sesil Karatantcheva	(United States) Ann Li (Japan) Kurumi Nara (Poland) Katarzyna Kawa (United States) Sophie Chang
April 8	Sharm El Sheikh, Egypt; Hard; W15; Singles and Doubles Draws	(Belgium) Magali Kempen; 6–1, 6–2	(Poland) Stefania Rogozińska Dzik	(Slovakia) Laura Maluniaková (Sweden) Susanne Celik	(Russia) Anastasia Zolotareva (Serbia) Barbara Bonić (Belgium) Victoria Kalaitzis (Japan) Ange Oby Kajuru
April 8	Sharm El Sheikh, Egypt; Hard; W15; Singles and Doubles Draws	(United States) Nadja Gilchrist (Canada) Louise Kwong; 6–1, 6–1	(Poland) Marcelina Podlińska (Poland) Stefania Rogozińska Dzik	(Slovakia) Laura Maluniaková (Sweden) Susanne Celik	(Russia) Anastasia Zolotareva (Serbia) Barbara Bonić (Belgium) Victoria Kalaitzis (Japan) Ange Oby Kajuru
April 8	Shymkent, Kazakhstan; Clay; W15; Singles and Doubles Draws	(Russia) Kamilla Rakhimova; 6–2, 7–5	(Serbia) Tamara Čurović	(Kazakhstan) Gozal Ainitdinova (Russia) Daria Kruzhkova	(Russia) Anastasia Zakharova (Israel) Vlada Ekshibarova (Russia) Angelina Zhuravleva (Kazakhstan) Yekaterina Dmitrichenko
April 8	Shymkent, Kazakhstan; Clay; W15; Singles and Doubles Draws	(Russia) Kamilla Rakhimova (Moldova) Vitalia Stamat; 6–3, 7–6^{(7–4)}	(South Korea) Lee Eun-hye (Uzbekistan) Sevil Yuldasheva	(Kazakhstan) Gozal Ainitdinova (Russia) Daria Kruzhkova	(Russia) Anastasia Zakharova (Israel) Vlada Ekshibarova (Russia) Angelina Zhuravleva (Kazakhstan) Yekaterina Dmitrichenko
April 8	Cancún, Mexico; Hard; W15; Singles and Doubles Draws	(Japan) Natsumi Kawaguchi; 7–6^{(7–2)}, 6–7^{(2–7)}, 6–3	(United Kingdom) Emily Appleton	(Mexico) María José Portillo Ramírez (Spain) Alba Carrillo Marín	(Israel) Maya Tahan (United States) Chanelle Van Nguyen (United States) Dasha Kourkina (Israel) Nicole Nadel
April 8	Cancún, Mexico; Hard; W15; Singles and Doubles Draws	(Japan) Natsumi Kawaguchi (Israel) Maya Tahan; 6–1, 6–2	(United Kingdom) Emily Appleton (Mexico) María José Portillo Ramírez	(Mexico) María José Portillo Ramírez (Spain) Alba Carrillo Marín	(Israel) Maya Tahan (United States) Chanelle Van Nguyen (United States) Dasha Kourkina (Israel) Nicole Nadel
April 8	Tabarka, Tunisia; Clay; W15; Singles and Doubles Draws	(Spain) Ana Lantigua de la Nuez; 6–4, 6–4	(France) Marie Témin	(United Kingdom) Amanda Carreras (Czech Republic) Gabriela Horáčková	(Spain) Claudia Hoste Ferrer (Russia) Margarita Lazareva (Sweden) Louise Brunskog (Romania) Andreea Velcea
April 8	Tabarka, Tunisia; Clay; W15; Singles and Doubles Draws	(United Kingdom) Amanda Carreras (Spain) Ángela Fita Boluda; 6–2, 6–3	(United States) Sarah Lee (Belgium) Chelsea Vanhoutte	(United Kingdom) Amanda Carreras (Czech Republic) Gabriela Horáčková	(Spain) Claudia Hoste Ferrer (Russia) Margarita Lazareva (Sweden) Louise Brunskog (Romania) Andreea Velcea
April 8	Antalya, Turkey; Clay; W15; Singles and Doubles Draws	(South Korea) Park So-hyun; 6–2, 4–6, 6–4	(Switzerland) Joanne Züger	(Netherlands) Lexie Stevens (Switzerland) Jenny Dürst	(Czech Republic) Karolína Kubáňová (Slovenia) Manca Pislak (Croatia) Mariana Dražić (Germany) Irina Cantos Siemers
April 8	Antalya, Turkey; Clay; W15; Singles and Doubles Draws	(Switzerland) Marie Mettraux (Russia) Vera Zvonareva; 6–3, 0–6, [12–10]	(Czech Republic) Karolína Kubáňová (Czech Republic) Nikola Tomanová	(Netherlands) Lexie Stevens (Switzerland) Jenny Dürst	(Czech Republic) Karolína Kubáňová (Slovenia) Manca Pislak (Croatia) Mariana Dražić (Germany) Irina Cantos Siemers
April 15	Hardee's Pro Classic; Dothan, United States; Clay; W80; Singles Draw – Doubles Draw	(Slovakia) Kristína Kučová; 3–6, 7–6^{(11–9)}, 6–2	(United States) Lauren Davis	(United States) Francesca Di Lorenzo (Romania) Elena-Gabriela Ruse	(Czech Republic) Lucie Hradecká (Australia) Kimberly Birrell (United States) Usue Maitane Arconada (Russia) Sofya Zhuk
April 15	Hardee's Pro Classic; Dothan, United States; Clay; W80; Singles Draw – Doubles Draw	(United States) Usue Maitane Arconada (United States) Caroline Dolehide; 7–6^{(7–5)}, 6–4	(Australia) Destanee Aiava (Australia) Astra Sharma	(United States) Francesca Di Lorenzo (Romania) Elena-Gabriela Ruse	(Czech Republic) Lucie Hradecká (Australia) Kimberly Birrell (United States) Usue Maitane Arconada (Russia) Sofya Zhuk
April 15	Pula, Italy; Clay; W25; Singles and Doubles Draws	(Netherlands) Arantxa Rus; 6–7^{(2–7)}, 6–3, 6–1	(Ukraine) Daria Lopatetska	(Belgium) Kimberley Zimmermann (Liechtenstein) Kathinka von Deichmann	(Slovenia) Pia Čuk (Austria) Barbara Haas (Italy) Anastasia Grymalska (Spain) Olga Sáez Larra
April 15	Pula, Italy; Clay; W25; Singles and Doubles Draws	(Italy) Federica Di Sarra (Italy) Anastasia Grymalska; 6–4, 6–1	(Italy) Giorgia Marchetti (Italy) Camilla Rosatello	(Belgium) Kimberley Zimmermann (Liechtenstein) Kathinka von Deichmann	(Slovenia) Pia Čuk (Austria) Barbara Haas (Italy) Anastasia Grymalska (Spain) Olga Sáez Larra
April 15	Guayaquil, Ecuador; Clay; W15; Singles and Doubles Draws	(Chile) Fernanda Brito; 7–6^{(7–4)}, 4–6, 7–5	(Colombia) Yuliana Lizarazo	(Argentina) Carla Lucero (Ecuador) Mell Reasco González	(Czech Republic) Laetitia Pulchartová (United States) Sofia Sewing (Colombia) María Paulina Pérez (Chile) Ivania Martinich
April 15	Guayaquil, Ecuador; Clay; W15; Singles and Doubles Draws	(Chile) Fernanda Brito (Colombia) María Paulina Pérez; 6–3, 7–6^{(7–3)}	(United States) Mara Schmidt (Russia) Anastasia Shaulskaya	(Argentina) Carla Lucero (Ecuador) Mell Reasco González	(Czech Republic) Laetitia Pulchartová (United States) Sofia Sewing (Colombia) María Paulina Pérez (Chile) Ivania Martinich
April 15	Cairo, Egypt; Clay; W15; Singles and Doubles Draws	(Greece) Despina Papamichail; 6–3, 4–6, 6–4	(Slovenia) Nastja Kolar	(Austria) Melanie Klaffner (Slovakia) Viktória Morvayová	(Russia) Anastasia Zolotareva (Slovakia) Barbora Matúšová (Australia) Lisa Mays (Egypt) Aya El Sayed
April 15	Cairo, Egypt; Clay; W15; Singles and Doubles Draws	(Austria) Melanie Klaffner (Greece) Despina Papamichail; 6–3, 6–1	(Brazil) Júlia Konishi Camargo Silva (Ukraine) Katya Malikova	(Austria) Melanie Klaffner (Slovakia) Viktória Morvayová	(Russia) Anastasia Zolotareva (Slovakia) Barbora Matúšová (Australia) Lisa Mays (Egypt) Aya El Sayed
April 15	Shymkent, Kazakhstan; Clay; W15; Singles and Doubles Draws	(Russia) Anastasia Zakharova; 6–0, 6–0	(Kazakhstan) Gozal Ainitdinova	(Russia) Kamilla Rakhimova (Serbia) Tamara Čurović	(Russia) Angelina Zhuravleva (Ukraine) Viktoriia Dema (Romania) Ioana Gașpar (Russia) Gyulnara Nazarova
April 15	Shymkent, Kazakhstan; Clay; W15; Singles and Doubles Draws	(Serbia) Tamara Čurović (Russia) Anastasia Zakharova; 7–5, 6–2	(Kazakhstan) Dariya Detkovskaya (Kazakhstan) Zhibek Kulambayeva	(Russia) Kamilla Rakhimova (Serbia) Tamara Čurović	(Russia) Angelina Zhuravleva (Ukraine) Viktoriia Dema (Romania) Ioana Gașpar (Russia) Gyulnara Nazarova
April 15	Cancún, Mexico; Hard; W15; Singles and Doubles Draws	(Mexico) Marcela Zacarías; 6–4, 6–0	(Mexico) Andrea Renée Villarreal	(Mexico) Victoria Rodríguez (Israel) Nicole Nadel	(United States) Madison Westby (United States) Sabastiani León (Japan) Natsumi Kawaguchi (Mexico) María José Portillo Ramírez
April 15	Cancún, Mexico; Hard; W15; Singles and Doubles Draws	(Mexico) Victoria Rodríguez (Mexico) Marcela Zacarías; 6–2, 6–0	(France) Mathilde Armitano (Japan) Yuriko Lily Miyazaki	(Mexico) Victoria Rodríguez (Israel) Nicole Nadel	(United States) Madison Westby (United States) Sabastiani León (Japan) Natsumi Kawaguchi (Mexico) María José Portillo Ramírez
April 15	Tabarka, Tunisia; Clay; W15; Singles and Doubles Draws	(Spain) Rosa Vicens Mas; 6–4, 6–2	(United Kingdom) Amanda Carreras	(France) Alice Tubello (Croatia) Silvia Njirić	(Romania) Oana Gavrilă (Bosnia and Herzegovina) Nefisa Berberović (France) Marie Témin (Spain) Ana Lantigua de la Nuez
April 15	Tabarka, Tunisia; Clay; W15; Singles and Doubles Draws	(Bosnia and Herzegovina) Nefisa Berberović (Slovenia) Veronika Erjavec; 4–6, 6–3, [10–7]	(France) Émeline Dartron (France) Marie Témin	(France) Alice Tubello (Croatia) Silvia Njirić	(Romania) Oana Gavrilă (Bosnia and Herzegovina) Nefisa Berberović (France) Marie Témin (Spain) Ana Lantigua de la Nuez
April 15	Antalya, Turkey; Clay; W15; Singles and Doubles Draws	(South Africa) Chanel Simmonds; 6–2, 6–1	(Germany) Laura Schaeder	(Croatia) Mariana Dražić (Czech Republic) Nikola Tomanová	(Belgium) Eliessa Vanlangendonck (Russia) Aleksandra Pospelova (Germany) Carmen Schultheiss (Belarus) Anna Kubareva
April 15	Antalya, Turkey; Clay; W15; Singles and Doubles Draws	(Czech Republic) Karolína Kubáňová (Czech Republic) Nikola Tomanová; 6–3, 6–2	(Germany) Franziska Kommer (Germany) Laura Schaeder	(Croatia) Mariana Dražić (Czech Republic) Nikola Tomanová	(Belgium) Eliessa Vanlangendonck (Russia) Aleksandra Pospelova (Germany) Carmen Schultheiss (Belarus) Anna Kubareva
April 22	Boar's Head Resort Women's Open; Charlottesville, United States; Clay; W80; Singles Draw – Doubles Draw	(United States) Whitney Osuigwe; 6–4, 1–6, 6–3	(United States) Madison Brengle	(Poland) Katarzyna Kawa (Slovenia) Kaja Juvan	(United States) Taylor Townsend (Ukraine) Anhelina Kalinina (United States) Caty McNally (United States) Quinn Gleason
April 22	Boar's Head Resort Women's Open; Charlottesville, United States; Clay; W80; Singles Draw – Doubles Draw	(United States) Asia Muhammad (United States) Taylor Townsend; 4–6, 7–5, [10–3]	(Czech Republic) Lucie Hradecká (Poland) Katarzyna Kawa	(Poland) Katarzyna Kawa (Slovenia) Kaja Juvan	(United States) Taylor Townsend (Ukraine) Anhelina Kalinina (United States) Caty McNally (United States) Quinn Gleason
April 22	Pula, Italy; Clay; W25; Singles and Doubles Draws	(Netherlands) Arantxa Rus; 6–2, 6–7^{(6–8)}, 6–1	(United States) Elizabeth Halbauer	(France) Margot Yerolymos (Spain) Nuria Párrizas Díaz	(Russia) Victoria Kan (United Kingdom) Naiktha Bains (Belgium) Marie Benoît (Brazil) Carolina Alves
April 22	Pula, Italy; Clay; W25; Singles and Doubles Draws	(France) Manon Arcangioli (France) Elixane Lechemia; Walkover	(Russia) Victoria Kan (Russia) Anna Morgina	(France) Margot Yerolymos (Spain) Nuria Párrizas Díaz	(Russia) Victoria Kan (United Kingdom) Naiktha Bains (Belgium) Marie Benoît (Brazil) Carolina Alves
April 22	Chiasso, Switzerland; Clay; W25; Singles and Doubles Draws	(Russia) Varvara Gracheva; 6–4, 6–2	(Romania) Jaqueline Cristian	(Ukraine) Marta Kostyuk (Hungary) Dalma Gálfi	(Austria) Julia Grabher (Liechtenstein) Kathinka von Deichmann (Spain) María Gutiérrez Carrasco (Switzerland) Conny Perrin
April 22	Chiasso, Switzerland; Clay; W25; Singles and Doubles Draws	(Spain) Cristina Bucșa (Ukraine) Marta Kostyuk; 6–1, 3–6, [10–7]	(Canada) Sharon Fichman (Australia) Jaimee Fourlis	(Ukraine) Marta Kostyuk (Hungary) Dalma Gálfi	(Austria) Julia Grabher (Liechtenstein) Kathinka von Deichmann (Spain) María Gutiérrez Carrasco (Switzerland) Conny Perrin
April 22	The Oaks Club Challenger; Osprey, United States; Clay; W25; Singles and Doubles Draws	(United States) Ann Li; 6–3, 7–5	(United States) Usue Maitane Arconada	(Romania) Elena-Gabriela Ruse (Belarus) Olga Govortsova	(United States) Elizabeth Mandlik (Italy) Gaia Sanesi (Mexico) Renata Zarazúa (United States) Alexa Glatch
April 22	The Oaks Club Challenger; Osprey, United States; Clay; W25; Singles and Doubles Draws	(United States) Pamela Montez (Australia) Belinda Woolcock; 7–6^{(8–6)}, 6–3	(Netherlands) Arianne Hartono (Moldova) Alexandra Perper	(Romania) Elena-Gabriela Ruse (Belarus) Olga Govortsova	(United States) Elizabeth Mandlik (Italy) Gaia Sanesi (Mexico) Renata Zarazúa (United States) Alexa Glatch
April 22	Andijan, Uzbekistan; Hard; W25; Singles and Doubles Draws	(Russia) Kamilla Rakhimova; 0–6, 6–1, 6–3	(India) Pranjala Yadlapalli	(Uzbekistan) Nigina Abduraimova (Ukraine) Maryna Chernyshova	(Kazakhstan) Gozal Ainitdinova (Russia) Anastasia Zakharova (Russia) Anastasia Pribylova (Latvia) Diāna Marcinkēviča
April 22	Andijan, Uzbekistan; Hard; W25; Singles and Doubles Draws	(Hong Kong) Eudice Chong (Serbia) Tamara Čurović; 6–2, 6–3	(Russia) Amina Anshba (Czech Republic) Anastasia Dețiuc	(Uzbekistan) Nigina Abduraimova (Ukraine) Maryna Chernyshova	(Kazakhstan) Gozal Ainitdinova (Russia) Anastasia Zakharova (Russia) Anastasia Pribylova (Latvia) Diāna Marcinkēviča
April 22	Bucaramanga, Colombia; Clay; W15; Singles and Doubles Draws	(Chile) Fernanda Brito; 4–6, 6–3, 6–3	(Argentina) Carla Lucero	(United States) Sofia Sewing (Colombia) Jessica Plazas	(Colombia) Yuliana Lizarazo (Colombia) María Paulina Pérez (Colombia) María Fernanda Padilla Jaimes (United States) Akilah James
April 22	Bucaramanga, Colombia; Clay; W15; Singles and Doubles Draws	(Chile) Fernanda Brito (Colombia) María Paulina Pérez; 6–2, 6–2	(Colombia) Yuliana Lizarazo (Colombia) Antonia Samudio	(United States) Sofia Sewing (Colombia) Jessica Plazas	(Colombia) Yuliana Lizarazo (Colombia) María Paulina Pérez (Colombia) María Fernanda Padilla Jaimes (United States) Akilah James
April 22	Cairo, Egypt; Clay; W15; Singles and Doubles Draws	(Switzerland) Simona Waltert; 7–6^{(8–6)}, 7–5	(Austria) Melanie Klaffner	(Greece) Despina Papamichail (Australia) Seone Mendez	(Ecuador) Charlotte Römer (Japan) Yuka Hosoki (Egypt) Lamis Alhussein Abdel Aziz (Slovakia) Viktória Morvayová
April 22	Cairo, Egypt; Clay; W15; Singles and Doubles Draws	(Greece) Despina Papamichail (Switzerland) Simona Waltert; 6–3, 6–2	(Egypt) Mayar Sherif (Egypt) Rana Sherif Ahmed	(Greece) Despina Papamichail (Australia) Seone Mendez	(Ecuador) Charlotte Römer (Japan) Yuka Hosoki (Egypt) Lamis Alhussein Abdel Aziz (Slovakia) Viktória Morvayová
April 22	Cancún, Mexico; Hard; W15; Singles and Doubles Draws	(Mexico) Marcela Zacarías; 6–0, 7–5	(Mexico) Ana Sofía Sánchez	(United States) Amy Zhu (Mexico) Andrea Renée Villarreal	(Romania) Patricia Maria Țig (United States) Zoë Gwen Scandalis (Australia) Alexandra Osborne (Spain) Alba Carrillo Marín
April 22	Cancún, Mexico; Hard; W15; Singles and Doubles Draws	(Mexico) Andrea Renée Villarreal (Mexico) Marcela Zacarías; Walkover	(Australia) Alicia Smith (United States) Madison Westby	(United States) Amy Zhu (Mexico) Andrea Renée Villarreal	(Romania) Patricia Maria Țig (United States) Zoë Gwen Scandalis (Australia) Alexandra Osborne (Spain) Alba Carrillo Marín
April 22	Tabarka, Tunisia; Clay; W15; Singles and Doubles Draws	(France) Alice Ramé; 6–4, 6–2	(France) Émeline Dartron	(Slovenia) Veronika Erjavec (France) Léa Tholey	(Italy) Angelica Moratelli (Romania) Alexandra Damaschin (Bosnia and Herzegovina) Nefisa Berberović (France) Estelle Cascino
April 22	Tabarka, Tunisia; Clay; W15; Singles and Doubles Draws	(Czech Republic) Karolína Beránková (Italy) Angelica Moratelli; 7–5, 4–6, [10–7]	(United States) Sarah Lee (Belgium) Chelsea Vanhoutte	(Slovenia) Veronika Erjavec (France) Léa Tholey	(Italy) Angelica Moratelli (Romania) Alexandra Damaschin (Bosnia and Herzegovina) Nefisa Berberović (France) Estelle Cascino
April 22	Antalya, Turkey; Clay; W15; Singles and Doubles Draws	(Slovenia) Manca Pislak; 6–4, 2–6, 6–4	(Belarus) Anna Kubareva	(South Africa) Chanel Simmonds (Germany) Sina Herrmann	(Russia) Ekaterina Ovcharenko (Japan) Nana Kawagishi (Germany) Franziska Kommer (Kyrgyzstan) Ksenia Palkina
April 22	Antalya, Turkey; Clay; W15; Singles and Doubles Draws	(Switzerland) Jenny Dürst (Switzerland) Chiara Grimm; Walkover	(Kyrgyzstan) Ksenia Palkina (China) Zhang Ying	(South Africa) Chanel Simmonds (Germany) Sina Herrmann	(Russia) Ekaterina Ovcharenko (Japan) Nana Kawagishi (Germany) Franziska Kommer (Kyrgyzstan) Ksenia Palkina
April 29	LTP Charleston Pro Tennis; Charleston, United States; Clay; W100; Singles Draw – Doubles Draw	(United States) Taylor Townsend; 6–4, 6–4	(United States) Whitney Osuigwe	(Slovenia) Kaja Juvan (United States) Emma Navarro	(United States) Louisa Chirico (United States) Nicole Gibbs (Ukraine) Anhelina Kalinina (United States) Cori Gauff
April 29	LTP Charleston Pro Tennis; Charleston, United States; Clay; W100; Singles Draw – Doubles Draw	(United States) Asia Muhammad (United States) Taylor Townsend; 6–2, 6–2	(United States) Madison Brengle (United States) Lauren Davis	(Slovenia) Kaja Juvan (United States) Emma Navarro	(United States) Louisa Chirico (United States) Nicole Gibbs (Ukraine) Anhelina Kalinina (United States) Cori Gauff
April 29	Kangaroo Cup; Gifu, Japan; Hard; W80; Singles Draw – Doubles Draw	(Kazakhstan) Zarina Diyas; 6–0, 6–2	(Chinese Taipei) Liang En-shuo	(Japan) Kyōka Okamura (Australia) Maddison Inglis	(China) Han Xinyun (Japan) Akiko Omae (Japan) Kurumi Nara (Japan) Risa Ozaki
April 29	Kangaroo Cup; Gifu, Japan; Hard; W80; Singles Draw – Doubles Draw	(China) Duan Yingying (China) Han Xinyun; 6–3, 4–6, [10–4]	(Japan) Akiko Omae (Thailand) Peangtarn Plipuech	(Japan) Kyōka Okamura (Australia) Maddison Inglis	(China) Han Xinyun (Japan) Akiko Omae (Japan) Kurumi Nara (Japan) Risa Ozaki
April 29	Wiesbaden Tennis Open; Wiesbaden, Germany; Clay; W60; Singles Draw – Doubles Draw	(Czech Republic) Barbora Krejčíková; 6–4, 7–6^{(7–2)}	(Ukraine) Katarina Zavatska	(Russia) Anna Blinkova (Chile) Daniela Seguel	(Serbia) Dejana Radanović (Turkey) Çağla Büyükakçay (Australia) Jaimee Fourlis (Netherlands) Arantxa Rus
April 29	Wiesbaden Tennis Open; Wiesbaden, Germany; Clay; W60; Singles Draw – Doubles Draw	(Russia) Anna Blinkova (Belgium) Yanina Wickmayer; 6–3, 4–6, [10–3]	(Australia) Jaimee Fourlis (Liechtenstein) Kathinka von Deichmann	(Russia) Anna Blinkova (Chile) Daniela Seguel	(Serbia) Dejana Radanović (Turkey) Çağla Büyükakçay (Australia) Jaimee Fourlis (Netherlands) Arantxa Rus
April 29	Torneig Internacional Els Gorchs; Les Franqueses del Vallès, Spain; Hard; W60; Singles Draw – Doubles Draw	(United Kingdom) Katy Dunne; 7–5, 6–3	(Spain) Paula Badosa Gibert	(Spain) Cristina Bucșa (United Kingdom) Jodie Burrage	(Switzerland) Susan Bandecchi (Georgia (country)) Mariam Bolkvadze (Serbia) Nina Stojanović (Bulgaria) Elitsa Kostova
April 29	Torneig Internacional Els Gorchs; Les Franqueses del Vallès, Spain; Hard; W60; Singles Draw – Doubles Draw	(France) Jessika Ponchet (United Kingdom) Eden Silva; 6–3, 6–4	(United Kingdom) Jodie Burrage (United Kingdom) Olivia Nicholls	(Spain) Cristina Bucșa (United Kingdom) Jodie Burrage	(Switzerland) Susan Bandecchi (Georgia (country)) Mariam Bolkvadze (Serbia) Nina Stojanović (Bulgaria) Elitsa Kostova
April 29	Pula, Italy; Clay; W25; Singles and Doubles Draws	(Sweden) Mirjam Björklund; 6–3, 7–6^{(7–3)}	(Brazil) Gabriela Cé	(Italy) Jessica Pieri (France) Margot Yerolymos	(Italy) Deborah Chiesa (United Kingdom) Naiktha Bains (Slovenia) Nina Potočnik (United States) Chiara Scholl
April 29	Pula, Italy; Clay; W25; Singles and Doubles Draws	(Brazil) Gabriela Cé (United States) Chiara Scholl; 6–0, 7–5	(United Kingdom) Naiktha Bains (Hungary) Anna Bondár	(Italy) Jessica Pieri (France) Margot Yerolymos	(Italy) Deborah Chiesa (United Kingdom) Naiktha Bains (Slovenia) Nina Potočnik (United States) Chiara Scholl
April 29	RWB Ladies Cup; Khimki, Russia; Hard (indoor); W25; Singles and Doubles Draws	(Russia) Sofya Lansere; 6–1, 4–6, 6–3	(Bosnia and Herzegovina) Dea Herdželaš	(Russia) Anastasia Tikhonova (Russia) Ekaterina Makarova	(Russia) Varvara Gracheva (Ukraine) Daria Snigur (Russia) Oksana Selekhmeteva (Russia) Ekaterina Kazionova
April 29	RWB Ladies Cup; Khimki, Russia; Hard (indoor); W25; Singles and Doubles Draws	(United Kingdom) Freya Christie (Russia) Ekaterina Yashina; 6–3, 6–3	(Russia) Anastasia Frolova (Russia) Sofya Lansere	(Russia) Anastasia Tikhonova (Russia) Ekaterina Makarova	(Russia) Varvara Gracheva (Ukraine) Daria Snigur (Russia) Oksana Selekhmeteva (Russia) Ekaterina Kazionova
April 29	Namangan, Uzbekistan; Hard; W25; Singles and Doubles Draws	(Russia) Valeria Savinykh; 6–0, 4–6, 7–5	(Hong Kong) Eudice Chong	(Belarus) Shalimar Talbi (Russia) Amina Anshba	(Russia) Kamilla Rakhimova (Czech Republic) Anastasia Dețiuc (Bulgaria) Gergana Topalova (India) Rutuja Bhosale
April 29	Namangan, Uzbekistan; Hard; W25; Singles and Doubles Draws	(India) Rutuja Bhosale (Hong Kong) Eudice Chong; 6–4, 6–3	(Russia) Anastasia Pribylova (Belarus) Shalimar Talbi	(Belarus) Shalimar Talbi (Russia) Amina Anshba	(Russia) Kamilla Rakhimova (Czech Republic) Anastasia Dețiuc (Bulgaria) Gergana Topalova (India) Rutuja Bhosale
April 29	Cairo, Egypt; Clay; W15; Singles and Doubles Draws	(Egypt) Mayar Sherif; 6–2, 6–1	(Switzerland) Simona Waltert	(Austria) Melanie Klaffner (Ecuador) Charlotte Römer	(Australia) Seone Mendez (Egypt) Lamis Alhussein Abdel Aziz (Serbia) Elena Milovanović (Russia) Anastasia Zolotareva
April 29	Cairo, Egypt; Clay; W15; Singles and Doubles Draws	(Slovakia) Alica Rusová (Switzerland) Simona Waltert; 7–5, 0–6, [10–6]	(Australia) Seone Mendez (Ecuador) Charlotte Römer	(Austria) Melanie Klaffner (Ecuador) Charlotte Römer	(Australia) Seone Mendez (Egypt) Lamis Alhussein Abdel Aziz (Serbia) Elena Milovanović (Russia) Anastasia Zolotareva
April 29	Tbilisi, Georgia; Hard; W15; Singles and Doubles Draws	(Russia) Anastasia Zakharova; 6–2, 6–1	(Russia) Taisya Pachkaleva	(Georgia (country)) Mariam Dalakishvili (Russia) Daria Kudashova	(Belarus) Hanna Sokal (Greece) Eleni Mtsentlitze (Russia) Maria Timofeeva (Czech Republic) Veronika Vlkovská
April 29	Tbilisi, Georgia; Hard; W15; Singles and Doubles Draws	(Turkey) Melis Sezer (Belgium) Eliessa Vanlangendonck; Walkover	(Canada) Noëlly Longi Nsimba (Russia) Alina Silich	(Georgia (country)) Mariam Dalakishvili (Russia) Daria Kudashova	(Belarus) Hanna Sokal (Greece) Eleni Mtsentlitze (Russia) Maria Timofeeva (Czech Republic) Veronika Vlkovská
April 29	Tabarka, Tunisia; Clay; W15; Singles and Doubles Draws	(France) Estelle Cascino; 7–6^{(7–3)}, 7–6^{(7–3)}	(France) Léa Tholey	(Portugal) Inês Murta (Chile) Bárbara Gatica	(Germany) Lena Lutzeier (Hong Kong) Adithya Karunaratne (Canada) Maria Tanasescu (United States) Elvina Kalieva
April 29	Tabarka, Tunisia; Clay; W15; Singles and Doubles Draws	(Czech Republic) Kristýna Hrabalová (Poland) Joanna Zawadzka; 7–6^{(7–4)}, 6–7^{(7–9)}, [11–9]	(Chile) Bárbara Gatica (Brazil) Rebeca Pereira	(Portugal) Inês Murta (Chile) Bárbara Gatica	(Germany) Lena Lutzeier (Hong Kong) Adithya Karunaratne (Canada) Maria Tanasescu (United States) Elvina Kalieva
April 29	Antalya, Turkey; Clay; W15; Singles and Doubles Draws	(Netherlands) Indy de Vroome; 6–1, 6–0	(India) Jennifer Luikham	(Greece) Sapfo Sakellaridi (Japan) Honoka Kobayashi	(Turkey) İlay Yörük (Turkey) Cemre Anıl (Belgium) Justine Pysson (Russia) Daria Nazarkina
April 29	Antalya, Turkey; Clay; W15; Singles and Doubles Draws	(Hungary) Vanda Lukács (Slovenia) Manca Pislak; 7–5, 5–7, [10–6]	(India) Jennifer Luikham (Japan) Ramu Ueda	(Greece) Sapfo Sakellaridi (Japan) Honoka Kobayashi	(Turkey) İlay Yörük (Turkey) Cemre Anıl (Belgium) Justine Pysson (Russia) Daria Nazarkina

=== May ===
Week of	Tournament	Winner	Runners-up	Semifinalists	Quarterfinalists
May 6	FineMark Women's Pro Tennis Championship; Bonita Springs, United States; Clay; W100; Singles Draw – Doubles Draw	(United States) Lauren Davis; 7–5, 7–5	(United States) Ann Li	(United States) Francesca Di Lorenzo (United States) Whitney Osuigwe	(United States) Louisa Chirico (Paraguay) Verónica Cepede Royg (United States) Sachia Vickery (United States) Taylor Townsend
May 6	FineMark Women's Pro Tennis Championship; Bonita Springs, United States; Clay; W100; Singles Draw – Doubles Draw	(Chile) Alexa Guarachi (New Zealand) Erin Routliffe; 6–3, 7–6^{(7–5)}	(United States) Usue Maitane Arconada (United States) Caroline Dolehide	(United States) Francesca Di Lorenzo (United States) Whitney Osuigwe	(United States) Louisa Chirico (Paraguay) Verónica Cepede Royg (United States) Sachia Vickery (United States) Taylor Townsend
May 6	Open de Cagnes-sur-Mer; Cagnes-sur-Mer, France; Clay; W80; Singles Draw – Doubles Draw	(United States) Christina McHale; 7–6^{(7–4)}, 6–2	(Switzerland) Stefanie Vögele	(Hungary) Tímea Babos (Switzerland) Timea Bacsinszky	(United States) Varvara Lepchenko (Brazil) Beatriz Haddad Maia (Switzerland) Conny Perrin (Italy) Martina Di Giuseppe
May 6	Open de Cagnes-sur-Mer; Cagnes-sur-Mer, France; Clay; W80; Singles Draw – Doubles Draw	(Russia) Anna Blinkova (Switzerland) Xenia Knoll; 4–6, 6–2, [14–12]	(Brazil) Beatriz Haddad Maia (Brazil) Luisa Stefani	(Hungary) Tímea Babos (Switzerland) Timea Bacsinszky	(United States) Varvara Lepchenko (Brazil) Beatriz Haddad Maia (Switzerland) Conny Perrin (Italy) Martina Di Giuseppe
May 6	Jin'an Open; Lu'an, China; Hard; W60; Singles Draw – Doubles Draw	(China) Han Xinyun; 4–6, 6–2, 6–2	(China) Duan Yingying	(China) Zhu Lin (India) Ankita Raina	(United States) Catherine Harrison (Russia) Valeria Savinykh (China) Ma Shuyue (Hong Kong) Eudice Chong
May 6	Jin'an Open; Lu'an, China; Hard; W60; Singles Draw – Doubles Draw	(Indonesia) Beatrice Gumulya (China) You Xiaodi; 6–1, 7–5	(Japan) Mai Minokoshi (Japan) Erika Sema	(China) Zhu Lin (India) Ankita Raina	(United States) Catherine Harrison (Russia) Valeria Savinykh (China) Ma Shuyue (Hong Kong) Eudice Chong
May 6	Fukuoka International Women's Cup; Fukuoka, Japan; Carpet; W60; Singles Draw – Doubles Draw	(United Kingdom) Heather Watson; 7–6^{(7–1)}, 7–6^{(7–4)}	(Kazakhstan) Zarina Diyas	(Canada) Rebecca Marino (United States) Kristie Ahn	(Japan) Risa Ozaki (Japan) Ayano Shimizu (United States) Emina Bektas (Chinese Taipei) Liang En-shuo
May 6	Fukuoka International Women's Cup; Fukuoka, Japan; Carpet; W60; Singles Draw – Doubles Draw	(United Kingdom) Naomi Broady (United Kingdom) Heather Watson; Walkover	(United States) Kristie Ahn (Australia) Alison Bai	(Canada) Rebecca Marino (United States) Kristie Ahn	(Japan) Risa Ozaki (Japan) Ayano Shimizu (United States) Emina Bektas (Chinese Taipei) Liang En-shuo
May 6	Rome, Italy; Clay; W25; Singles and Doubles Draws	(Chile) Daniela Seguel; 6–1, 7–5	(Brazil) Gabriela Cé	(Italy) Camilla Scala (Australia) Jaimee Fourlis	(Serbia) Dejana Radanović (Argentina) Paula Ormaechea (Brazil) Teliana Pereira (United Kingdom) Katie Swan
May 6	Rome, Italy; Clay; W25; Singles and Doubles Draws	(Australia) Arina Rodionova (Australia) Storm Sanders; 6–2, 6–3	(Brazil) Gabriela Cé (Romania) Cristina Dinu	(Italy) Camilla Scala (Australia) Jaimee Fourlis	(Serbia) Dejana Radanović (Argentina) Paula Ormaechea (Brazil) Teliana Pereira (United Kingdom) Katie Swan
May 6	Óbidos, Portugal; Carpet; W25; Singles and Doubles Draws	(Turkey) Pemra Özgen; 7–5, 3–0, ret.	(Poland) Urszula Radwańska	(Greece) Valentini Grammatikopoulou (United Kingdom) Emily Webley-Smith	(Czech Republic) Monika Kilnarová (Switzerland) Susan Bandecchi (United States) Maria Sanchez (Georgia (country)) Mariam Bolkvadze
May 6	Óbidos, Portugal; Carpet; W25; Singles and Doubles Draws	(Georgia (country)) Sofia Shapatava (United Kingdom) Emily Webley-Smith; 6–3, 6–0	(Italy) Martina Colmegna (Colombia) María Herazo González	(Greece) Valentini Grammatikopoulou (United Kingdom) Emily Webley-Smith	(Czech Republic) Monika Kilnarová (Switzerland) Susan Bandecchi (United States) Maria Sanchez (Georgia (country)) Mariam Bolkvadze
May 6	Torneo Conchita Martínez; Monzón, Spain; Hard; W25; Singles and Doubles Draws	(Argentina) Nadia Podoroska; 6–2, 4–6, 6–2	(Spain) Cristina Bucșa	(Czech Republic) Marie Bouzková (Ukraine) Valeriya Strakhova	(Romania) Ioana Loredana Roșca (Spain) Irene Burillo Escorihuela (Hungary) Dalma Gálfi (France) Jessika Ponchet
May 6	Torneo Conchita Martínez; Monzón, Spain; Hard; W25; Singles and Doubles Draws	(Croatia) Jana Fett (Hungary) Dalma Gálfi; 7–6^{(7–2)}, 6–2	(Greece) Despina Papamichail (Serbia) Nina Stojanović	(Czech Republic) Marie Bouzková (Ukraine) Valeriya Strakhova	(Romania) Ioana Loredana Roșca (Spain) Irene Burillo Escorihuela (Hungary) Dalma Gálfi (France) Jessika Ponchet
May 6	Tučepi, Croatia; Clay; W15; Singles and Doubles Draws	(Czech Republic) Johana Marková; 6–4, 6–1	(Slovenia) Veronika Erjavec	(Bosnia and Herzegovina) Nefisa Berberović (Croatia) Antonia Ružić	(Russia) Victoria Borodulina (Czech Republic) Nikola Břečková (Slovenia) Nika Radišič (Romania) Oana Georgeta Simion
May 6	Tučepi, Croatia; Clay; W15; Singles and Doubles Draws	(Bosnia and Herzegovina) Nefisa Berberović (Slovenia) Veronika Erjavec; 6–2, 6–2	(Serbia) Tamara Malešević (Croatia) Antonia Ružić	(Bosnia and Herzegovina) Nefisa Berberović (Croatia) Antonia Ružić	(Russia) Victoria Borodulina (Czech Republic) Nikola Břečková (Slovenia) Nika Radišič (Romania) Oana Georgeta Simion
May 6	Heraklion, Greece; Clay; W15; Singles and Doubles Draws	(Serbia) Draginja Vuković; 6–2, 2–0, ret.	(Hungary) Vanda Lukács	(United States) Isabella Harvison (Austria) Mira Antonitsch	(Bolivia) Noelia Zeballos (Russia) Darya Astakhova (Gabon) Célestine Avomo Ella (Israel) Lina Glushko
May 6	Heraklion, Greece; Clay; W15; Singles and Doubles Draws	(Israel) Maya Tahan (Serbia) Draginja Vuković; Walkover	(Kazakhstan) Zhibek Kulambayeva (Hungary) Vanda Lukács	(United States) Isabella Harvison (Austria) Mira Antonitsch	(Bolivia) Noelia Zeballos (Russia) Darya Astakhova (Gabon) Célestine Avomo Ella (Israel) Lina Glushko
May 6	Cancún, Mexico; Hard; W15; Singles and Doubles Draws	(Mexico) Marcela Zacarías; 6–3, 6–1	(Mexico) María José Portillo Ramírez	(United States) Madison Westby (Canada) Alexandra Vagramov	(Brazil) Eduarda Piai (Switzerland) Pauline Wuarin (Bulgaria) Eleonore Tchakarova (Mexico) Andrea Renée Villarreal
May 6	Cancún, Mexico; Hard; W15; Singles and Doubles Draws	(Mexico) María José Portillo Ramírez (Mexico) Marcela Zacarías; 6–2, 6–2	(Brazil) Eduarda Piai (Guatemala) Kirsten-Andrea Weedon	(United States) Madison Westby (Canada) Alexandra Vagramov	(Brazil) Eduarda Piai (Switzerland) Pauline Wuarin (Bulgaria) Eleonore Tchakarova (Mexico) Andrea Renée Villarreal
May 6	Gothenburg, Sweden; Clay; W15; Singles and Doubles Draws	(Czech Republic) Aneta Laboutková; 2–6, 7–6^{(7–4)}, 6–3	(Sweden) Caijsa Hennemann	(Netherlands) Annick Melgers (Russia) Alina Silich	(Sweden) Marina Yudanov (Slovakia) Ingrid Vojčináková (Denmark) Sofia Samavati (Norway) Astrid Wanja Brune Olsen
May 6	Gothenburg, Sweden; Clay; W15; Singles and Doubles Draws	(Sweden) Caijsa Hennemann (Sweden) Melis Yasar; 6–2, 6–3	(Czech Republic) Klára Hájková (Czech Republic) Aneta Laboutková	(Netherlands) Annick Melgers (Russia) Alina Silich	(Sweden) Marina Yudanov (Slovakia) Ingrid Vojčináková (Denmark) Sofia Samavati (Norway) Astrid Wanja Brune Olsen
May 6	Tabarka, Tunisia; Clay; W15; Singles and Doubles Draws	(Netherlands) Eva Vedder; 6–1, 6–4	(Bulgaria) Ani Vangelova	(Czech Republic) Gabriela Horáčková (Netherlands) Indy de Vroome	(Chile) Bárbara Gatica (Argentina) Agustina Chlpac (Germany) Katharina Hering (Italy) Gloria Ceschi
May 6	Tabarka, Tunisia; Clay; W15; Singles and Doubles Draws	(Chile) Bárbara Gatica (Brazil) Rebeca Pereira; 6–3, 1–6, [10–5]	(Netherlands) Eva Vedder (Netherlands) Stéphanie Visscher	(Czech Republic) Gabriela Horáčková (Netherlands) Indy de Vroome	(Chile) Bárbara Gatica (Argentina) Agustina Chlpac (Germany) Katharina Hering (Italy) Gloria Ceschi
May 6	Antalya, Turkey; Clay; W15; Singles and Doubles Draws	(Luxembourg) Eléonora Molinaro; 7–5, 6–4	(Turkey) Zeynep Sönmez	(Algeria) Inès Ibbou (Ukraine) Anastasiya Poplavska	(Turkey) İlay Yörük (China) Zhang Ying (Netherlands) Noa Liauw a Fong (Ukraine) Viktoriya Gogol
May 6	Antalya, Turkey; Clay; W15; Singles and Doubles Draws	(Turkey) Cemre Anıl (United States) Dasha Ivanova; 6–3, 7–5	(Russia) Yulia Kulikova (Luxembourg) Eléonora Molinaro	(Algeria) Inès Ibbou (Ukraine) Anastasiya Poplavska	(Turkey) İlay Yörük (China) Zhang Ying (Netherlands) Noa Liauw a Fong (Ukraine) Viktoriya Gogol
May 6	Williamsburg, United States; Clay; W15; Singles and Doubles Draws	(United States) Natasha Subhash; 6–2, 6–3	(Switzerland) Nina Stadler	(United States) Joelle Kissell (United States) Elaine Chervinsky	(United States) Vanessa Ong (United States) Reese Brantmeier (United States) Jaedan Brown (United States) Kimmi Hance
May 6	Williamsburg, United States; Clay; W15; Singles and Doubles Draws	(United States) Savannah Broadus (United States) Vanessa Ong; 6–3, 6–1	(United States) Elaine Chervinsky (United States) Kylie Collins	(United States) Joelle Kissell (United States) Elaine Chervinsky	(United States) Vanessa Ong (United States) Reese Brantmeier (United States) Jaedan Brown (United States) Kimmi Hance
May 13	Empire Slovak Open; Trnava, Slovakia; Clay; W100; Singles Draw – Doubles Draw	(United States) Bernarda Pera; 7–5, 7–5	(Russia) Anna Blinkova	(United States) Christina McHale (Paraguay) Verónica Cepede Royg	(Germany) Antonia Lottner (Poland) Magdalena Fręch (Hungary) Anna Bondár (Germany) Laura Siegemund
May 13	Empire Slovak Open; Trnava, Slovakia; Clay; W100; Singles Draw – Doubles Draw	(Russia) Anna Blinkova (Switzerland) Xenia Knoll; 7–5, 7–5	(Sweden) Cornelia Lister (Czech Republic) Renata Voráčová	(United States) Christina McHale (Paraguay) Verónica Cepede Royg	(Germany) Antonia Lottner (Poland) Magdalena Fręch (Hungary) Anna Bondár (Germany) Laura Siegemund
May 13	Open Saint-Gaudens Occitanie; Saint-Gaudens, France; Clay; W60; Singles Draw – Doubles Draw	(Russia) Anna Kalinskaya; 6–3, 6–4	(Romania) Ana Bogdan	(Croatia) Jana Fett (Czech Republic) Tereza Martincová	(Russia) Sofya Zhuk (France) Chloé Paquet (United States) Cori Gauff (Italy) Giulia Gatto-Monticone
May 13	Open Saint-Gaudens Occitanie; Saint-Gaudens, France; Clay; W60; Singles Draw – Doubles Draw	(Italy) Martina Di Giuseppe (Italy) Giulia Gatto-Monticone; 6–1, 6–1	(Russia) Anna Kalinskaya (Russia) Sofya Lansere	(Croatia) Jana Fett (Czech Republic) Tereza Martincová	(Russia) Sofya Zhuk (France) Chloé Paquet (United States) Cori Gauff (Italy) Giulia Gatto-Monticone
May 13	Kurume Cup; Kurume, Japan; Carpet; W60; Singles Draw – Doubles Draw	(Canada) Rebecca Marino; 6–4, 7–6^{(7–0)}	(Japan) Yuki Naito	(Australia) Kaylah McPhee (Japan) Yuuki Tanaka	(United Kingdom) Heather Watson (Turkey) Berfu Cengiz (United States) Ena Shibahara (Serbia) Jovana Jakšić
May 13	Kurume Cup; Kurume, Japan; Carpet; W60; Singles Draw – Doubles Draw	(Japan) Hiroko Kuwata (United States) Ena Shibahara; 0–6, 6–4, [10–5]	(Japan) Erina Hayashi (Japan) Moyuka Uchijima	(Australia) Kaylah McPhee (Japan) Yuuki Tanaka	(United Kingdom) Heather Watson (Turkey) Berfu Cengiz (United States) Ena Shibahara (Serbia) Jovana Jakšić
May 13	Torneig Internacional de Tennis Femení Solgironès; La Bisbal d'Empordà, Spain; Clay; W60+H; Singles Draw – Doubles Draw	(China) Wang Xiyu; 4–6, 6–3, 6–2	(Hungary) Dalma Gálfi	(Spain) Paula Badosa Gibert (Georgia (country)) Ekaterine Gorgodze	(Luxembourg) Mandy Minella (Belgium) Maryna Zanevska (Ukraine) Marta Kostyuk (United Kingdom) Naiktha Bains
May 13	Torneig Internacional de Tennis Femení Solgironès; La Bisbal d'Empordà, Spain; Clay; W60+H; Singles Draw – Doubles Draw	(Australia) Arina Rodionova (Australia) Storm Sanders; 6–4, 6–4	(Hungary) Dalma Gálfi (Spain) Georgina García Pérez	(Spain) Paula Badosa Gibert (Georgia (country)) Ekaterine Gorgodze	(Luxembourg) Mandy Minella (Belgium) Maryna Zanevska (Ukraine) Marta Kostyuk (United Kingdom) Naiktha Bains
May 13	Wuhan World Tennis Tour; Wuhan, China; Hard; W25; Singles and Doubles Draws	(China) Yuan Yue; 6–3, 7–6^{(8–6)}	(Japan) Akiko Omae	(China) Wang Meiling (China) Lu Jingjing	(China) Xun Fangying (China) Wang Danni (Japan) Erika Sema (China) Yang Yidi
May 13	Wuhan World Tennis Tour; Wuhan, China; Hard; W25; Singles and Doubles Draws	(China) Jiang Xinyu (Japan) Erika Sema; 7–6^{(7–3)}, 6–2	(China) Guo Meiqi (China) Wu Meixu	(China) Wang Meiling (China) Lu Jingjing	(China) Xun Fangying (China) Wang Danni (Japan) Erika Sema (China) Yang Yidi
May 13	Óbidos, Portugal; Carpet; W25; Singles and Doubles Draws	(Israel) Deniz Khazaniuk; 6–1, 2–6, 6–1	(Spain) Nuria Párrizas Díaz	(Czech Republic) Anastasia Zarycká (United Kingdom) Amanda Carreras	(Poland) Urszula Radwańska (Bulgaria) Petia Arshinkova (United States) Maria Sanchez (United Kingdom) Emily Webley-Smith
May 13	Óbidos, Portugal; Carpet; W25; Singles and Doubles Draws	(Georgia (country)) Sofia Shapatava (United Kingdom) Emily Webley-Smith; 6–4, 6–1	(Italy) Martina Colmegna (Spain) Nuria Párrizas Díaz	(Czech Republic) Anastasia Zarycká (United Kingdom) Amanda Carreras	(Poland) Urszula Radwańska (Bulgaria) Petia Arshinkova (United States) Maria Sanchez (United Kingdom) Emily Webley-Smith
May 13	Singapore; Hard; W25; Singles and Doubles Draws	(Papua New Guinea) Abigail Tere-Apisah; 6–3, 6–2	(Russia) Valeria Savinykh	(Indonesia) Beatrice Gumulya (Turkey) İpek Soylu	(United States) Jacqueline Cako (India) Riya Bhatia (United States) Catherine Harrison (Thailand) Chompoothip Jundakate
May 13	Singapore; Hard; W25; Singles and Doubles Draws	(Indonesia) Beatrice Gumulya (Indonesia) Jessy Rompies; 6–4, 0–6, [10–6]	(India) Rutuja Bhosale (Papua New Guinea) Abigail Tere-Apisah	(Indonesia) Beatrice Gumulya (Turkey) İpek Soylu	(United States) Jacqueline Cako (India) Riya Bhatia (United States) Catherine Harrison (Thailand) Chompoothip Jundakate
May 13	Changwon, South Korea; Hard; W25; Singles and Doubles Draws	(South Africa) Chanel Simmonds; 6–3, 7–5	(Chinese Taipei) Lee Ya-hsuan	(China) You Xiaodi (Switzerland) Leonie Küng	(United States) Hanna Chang (South Korea) Jang Su-jeong (United Kingdom) Maia Lumsden (South Korea) Lee Eun-hye
May 13	Changwon, South Korea; Hard; W25; Singles and Doubles Draws	(Chinese Taipei) Hsu Chieh-yu (South Africa) Chanel Simmonds; 6–3, 6–4	(South Korea) Choi Ji-hee (Chinese Taipei) Lee Ya-hsuan	(China) You Xiaodi (Switzerland) Leonie Küng	(United States) Hanna Chang (South Korea) Jang Su-jeong (United Kingdom) Maia Lumsden (South Korea) Lee Eun-hye
May 13	Heraklion, Greece; Clay; W15; Singles and Doubles Draws	(Hungary) Vanda Lukács; 7–5, 6–2	(Russia) Darya Astakhova	(France) Alice Tubello (United States) Isabella Harvison	(Croatia) Oleksandra Oliynykova (Israel) Lina Glushko (Georgia (country)) Mariam Dalakishvili (Switzerland) Fiona Ganz
May 13	Heraklion, Greece; Clay; W15; Singles and Doubles Draws	(Greece) Anna Arkadianou (Russia) Elina Nepliy; 6–2, 6–4	(Russia) Darya Astakhova (Croatia) Oleksandra Oliynykova	(France) Alice Tubello (United States) Isabella Harvison	(Croatia) Oleksandra Oliynykova (Israel) Lina Glushko (Georgia (country)) Mariam Dalakishvili (Switzerland) Fiona Ganz
May 13	Barletta, Italy; Clay; W15; Singles and Doubles Draws	(United States) Elizabeth Mandlik; 6–0, 6–2	(Romania) Oana Georgeta Simion	(United States) Alexa Noel (Italy) Federica Arcidiacono	(Italy) Federica Bilardo (France) Kélia Le Bihan (Italy) Beatrice Lombardo (Italy) Angelica Raggi
May 13	Barletta, Italy; Clay; W15; Singles and Doubles Draws	(Italy) Federica Arcidiacono (Italy) Jessica Bertoldo; 6–2, 6–0	(Italy) Beatrice Lombardo (Italy) Angelica Raggi	(United States) Alexa Noel (Italy) Federica Arcidiacono	(Italy) Federica Bilardo (France) Kélia Le Bihan (Italy) Beatrice Lombardo (Italy) Angelica Raggi
May 13	Cancún, Mexico; Hard; W15; Singles and Doubles Draws	(Mexico) Marcela Zacarías; 6–3, 6–3	(Romania) Patricia Maria Țig	(Guatemala) Kirsten-Andrea Weedon (Montenegro) Vladica Babić	(Dominican Republic) Kelly Williford (Mexico) María José Portillo Ramírez (Canada) Alexandra Vagramov (United States) Amy Zhu
May 13	Cancún, Mexico; Hard; W15; Singles and Doubles Draws	(Mexico) María José Portillo Ramírez (Mexico) Marcela Zacarías; 6–3, 7–6^{(12–10)}	(Brazil) Thaisa Grana Pedretti (Brazil) Eduarda Piai	(Guatemala) Kirsten-Andrea Weedon (Montenegro) Vladica Babić	(Dominican Republic) Kelly Williford (Mexico) María José Portillo Ramírez (Canada) Alexandra Vagramov (United States) Amy Zhu
May 13	Varberg, Sweden; Clay; W15; Singles and Doubles Draws	(Sweden) Marina Yudanov; 6–3, 7–5	(Russia) Ekaterina Makarova	(Sweden) Caijsa Hennemann (Denmark) Sofia Samavati	(Sweden) Alexandra Viktorovitch (Poland) Anna Hertel (Sweden) Fanny Östlund (Sweden) Ida Jarlskog
May 13	Varberg, Sweden; Clay; W15; Singles and Doubles Draws	(Sweden) Caijsa Hennemann (Sweden) Maria Petrovic; 7–6^{(7–3)}, 6–3	(Russia) Ekaterina Makarova (Belarus) Sadafmoh Tolibova	(Sweden) Caijsa Hennemann (Denmark) Sofia Samavati	(Sweden) Alexandra Viktorovitch (Poland) Anna Hertel (Sweden) Fanny Östlund (Sweden) Ida Jarlskog
May 13	Tacarigua, Trinidad and Tobago; Hard (indoor); W15; Singles and Doubles Draws	(United Kingdom) Alice Gillan; 6–3, 6–2	(Netherlands) Lexie Stevens	(United States) Akilah James (Colombia) Yuliana Lizarazo	(United States) Amy Kaplan (Switzerland) Pauline Wuarin (Trinidad and Tobago) Breana Stampfli (Venezuela) Nadia Echeverría Alam
May 13	Tacarigua, Trinidad and Tobago; Hard (indoor); W15; Singles and Doubles Draws	(Venezuela) Nadia Echeverría Alam (United States) Sabastiani León; 7–5, 6–4	(Poland) Olga Brózda (Poland) Paulina Jastrzębska	(United States) Akilah James (Colombia) Yuliana Lizarazo	(United States) Amy Kaplan (Switzerland) Pauline Wuarin (Trinidad and Tobago) Breana Stampfli (Venezuela) Nadia Echeverría Alam
May 13	Tabarka, Tunisia; Clay; W15; Singles and Doubles Draws	(Argentina) Julieta Lara Estable; 6–2, 3–6, 7–6^{(7–5)}	(Chile) Bárbara Gatica	(United States) Chiara Scholl (France) Emmanuelle Girard	(France) Agathe Timsit (Spain) Ángela Fita Boluda (Netherlands) Gabriella Mujan (Sweden) Louise Brunskog
May 13	Tabarka, Tunisia; Clay; W15; Singles and Doubles Draws	(Spain) Ángela Fita Boluda (Czech Republic) Gabriela Horáčková; 6–2, 6–3	(Italy) Verena Hofer (Italy) Irene Lavino	(United States) Chiara Scholl (France) Emmanuelle Girard	(France) Agathe Timsit (Spain) Ángela Fita Boluda (Netherlands) Gabriella Mujan (Sweden) Louise Brunskog
May 13	Antalya, Turkey; Clay; W15; Singles and Doubles Draws	(Luxembourg) Eléonora Molinaro; 6–2, 6–4	(Algeria) Inès Ibbou	(Bulgaria) Dia Evtimova (Switzerland) Chiara Grimm	(Russia) Daria Lavrichenko (Turkey) Zeynep Sönmez (Russia) Aleksandra Pospelova (Romania) Cristina Ene
May 13	Antalya, Turkey; Clay; W15; Singles and Doubles Draws	(Switzerland) Jenny Dürst (Switzerland) Chiara Grimm; 3–6, 6–1, [10–3]	(Russia) Ekaterina Kazionova (Russia) Aleksandra Pospelova	(Bulgaria) Dia Evtimova (Switzerland) Chiara Grimm	(Russia) Daria Lavrichenko (Turkey) Zeynep Sönmez (Russia) Aleksandra Pospelova (Romania) Cristina Ene
May 13	Naples, United States; Clay; W15; Singles and Doubles Draws	(United States) Katerina Stewart; 6–4, 6–3	(Australia) Belinda Woolcock	(United States) Kylie Collins (United States) Peyton Stearns	(United States) Mara Schmidt (United States) Reese Brantmeier (Czech Republic) Michaela Bayerlová (United States) Kimmi Hance
May 13	Naples, United States; Clay; W15; Singles and Doubles Draws	(United States) Mara Schmidt (Australia) Belinda Woolcock; 6–3, 5–7, [10–6]	(United States) Reese Brantmeier (United States) Kimmi Hance	(United States) Kylie Collins (United States) Peyton Stearns	(United States) Mara Schmidt (United States) Reese Brantmeier (Czech Republic) Michaela Bayerlová (United States) Kimmi Hance
May 20	Jerusalem, Israel; Hard; W25; Singles and Doubles Draws	(United Kingdom) Jodie Burrage; 2–6, 6–2, 6–3	(Latvia) Daniela Vismane	(United Kingdom) Samantha Murray (Russia) Valeriya Yushchenko	(Slovakia) Tereza Mihalíková (Russia) Ekaterina Yashina (Georgia (country)) Sofia Shapatava (Slovakia) Viktória Morvayová
May 20	Jerusalem, Israel; Hard; W25; Singles and Doubles Draws	(Belarus) Yuliya Hatouka (Slovakia) Tereza Mihalíková; 2–6, 6–4, [10–8]	(United Kingdom) Samantha Murray (Greece) Despina Papamichail	(United Kingdom) Samantha Murray (Russia) Valeriya Yushchenko	(Slovakia) Tereza Mihalíková (Russia) Ekaterina Yashina (Georgia (country)) Sofia Shapatava (Slovakia) Viktória Morvayová
May 20	Caserta, Italy; Clay; W25; Singles and Doubles Draws	(Russia) Varvara Gracheva; 6–3, 7–5	(Kazakhstan) Anna Danilina	(Italy) Cristiana Ferrando (Russia) Victoria Kan	(Belgium) Kimberley Zimmermann (Spain) Nuria Párrizas Díaz (Brazil) Gabriela Cé (Italy) Deborah Chiesa
May 20	Caserta, Italy; Clay; W25; Singles and Doubles Draws	(Australia) Lizette Cabrera (Austria) Julia Grabher; 6–3, 6–4	(Romania) Elena Bogdan (Slovakia) Vivien Juhászová	(Italy) Cristiana Ferrando (Russia) Victoria Kan	(Belgium) Kimberley Zimmermann (Spain) Nuria Párrizas Díaz (Brazil) Gabriela Cé (Italy) Deborah Chiesa
May 20	Karuizawa, Japan; Carpet; W25; Singles and Doubles Draws	(Serbia) Jovana Jakšić; 6–1, 4–6, 7–5	(Japan) Momoko Kobori	(Japan) Erina Hayashi (Switzerland) Leonie Küng	(Japan) Mai Hontama (United Kingdom) Naomi Broady (Japan) Sakura Hondo (United States) Emina Bektas
May 20	Karuizawa, Japan; Carpet; W25; Singles and Doubles Draws	(United Kingdom) Naomi Broady (Japan) Ayaka Okuno; 6–3, 2–6, [10–7]	(Japan) Erina Hayashi (Japan) Momoko Kobori	(Japan) Erina Hayashi (Switzerland) Leonie Küng	(Japan) Mai Hontama (United Kingdom) Naomi Broady (Japan) Sakura Hondo (United States) Emina Bektas
May 20	Singapore; Hard; W25; Singles and Doubles Draws	(Thailand) Nudnida Luangnam; 6–3, 6–2	(Indonesia) Aldila Sutjiadi	(Russia) Valeria Savinykh (New Zealand) Paige Hourigan	(Slovenia) Nastja Kolar (Thailand) Chompoothip Jundakate (United States) Jacqueline Cako (Papua New Guinea) Abigail Tere-Apisah
May 20	Singapore; Hard; W25; Singles and Doubles Draws	(New Zealand) Paige Hourigan (Indonesia) Aldila Sutjiadi; 6–1, 7–6^{(7–5)}	(United Kingdom) Emily Appleton (United States) Catherine Harrison	(Russia) Valeria Savinykh (New Zealand) Paige Hourigan	(Slovenia) Nastja Kolar (Thailand) Chompoothip Jundakate (United States) Jacqueline Cako (Papua New Guinea) Abigail Tere-Apisah
May 20	Goyang, South Korea; Hard; W25; Singles and Doubles Draws	(Serbia) Natalija Kostić; 6–3, 6–2	(United Kingdom) Maia Lumsden	(China) Zhang Yuxuan (United States) Jennifer Elie	(South Korea) Lee Eun-hye (Russia) Anastasia Gasanova (South Africa) Chanel Simmonds (Sweden) Jacqueline Cabaj Awad
May 20	Goyang, South Korea; Hard; W25; Singles and Doubles Draws	(Chinese Taipei) Hsu Chieh-yu (South Africa) Chanel Simmonds; 6–1, 6–3	(South Korea) Kim Na-ri (South Korea) Lee So-ra	(China) Zhang Yuxuan (United States) Jennifer Elie	(South Korea) Lee Eun-hye (Russia) Anastasia Gasanova (South Africa) Chanel Simmonds (Sweden) Jacqueline Cabaj Awad
May 20	Nonthaburi, Thailand; Hard; W25; Singles and Doubles Draws	(Australia) Maddison Inglis; 6–0, 6–2	(Thailand) Peangtarn Plipuech	(Japan) Akiko Omae (Thailand) Anchisa Chanta	(Thailand) Mananchaya Sawangkaew (Japan) Haruka Kaji (Japan) Mari Osaka (Australia) Alexandra Bozovic
May 20	Nonthaburi, Thailand; Hard; W25; Singles and Doubles Draws	(Bulgaria) Aleksandrina Naydenova (Turkey) İpek Soylu; 6–1, 6–3	(Japan) Haruka Kaji (Japan) Risa Ozaki	(Japan) Akiko Omae (Thailand) Anchisa Chanta	(Thailand) Mananchaya Sawangkaew (Japan) Haruka Kaji (Japan) Mari Osaka (Australia) Alexandra Bozovic
May 20	Heraklion, Greece; Clay; W15; Singles and Doubles Draws	(Serbia) Tamara Malešević; 6–3, 7–6^{(7–3)}	(Estonia) Elena Malõgina	(Belarus) Iryna Shymanovich (Sweden) Fanny Östlund	(Germany) Julia Kimmelmann (Croatia) Oleksandra Oliynykova (Romania) Gabriela Duca (France) Maëlys Bougrat
May 20	Heraklion, Greece; Clay; W15; Singles and Doubles Draws	(Japan) Ange Oby Kajuru (Slovakia) Laura Maluniaková; 6–4, 6–2	(Germany) Julia Kimmelmann (Netherlands) Noa Liauw a Fong	(Belarus) Iryna Shymanovich (Sweden) Fanny Östlund	(Germany) Julia Kimmelmann (Croatia) Oleksandra Oliynykova (Romania) Gabriela Duca (France) Maëlys Bougrat
May 20	Cancún, Mexico; Hard; W15; Singles and Doubles Draws	(United States) Sofia Sewing; 6–1, 1–6, 6–1	(United Kingdom) Emilie Lindh	(Guatemala) Kirsten-Andrea Weedon (United States) Zoë Gwen Scandalis	(Czech Republic) Laetitia Pulchartová (Canada) Jada Bui (Argentina) Melany Krywoj (United States) Monica Robinson
May 20	Cancún, Mexico; Hard; W15; Singles and Doubles Draws	(Brazil) Thaisa Grana Pedretti (Brazil) Eduarda Piai; 7–5, 7–5	(Guatemala) Kirsten-Andrea Weedon (United States) Amy Zhu	(Guatemala) Kirsten-Andrea Weedon (United States) Zoë Gwen Scandalis	(Czech Republic) Laetitia Pulchartová (Canada) Jada Bui (Argentina) Melany Krywoj (United States) Monica Robinson
May 20	Cantanhede, Portugal; Carpet; W15; Singles and Doubles Draws	(Germany) Lisa Ponomar; 6–1, 4–6, 6–3	(Czech Republic) Karolína Beránková	(Finland) Anastasia Kulikova (Spain) Alba Carrillo Marín	(Spain) Rebeka Masarova (Switzerland) Bojana Klincov (Russia) Anna Ureke (Portugal) Francisca Jorge
May 20	Cantanhede, Portugal; Carpet; W15; Singles and Doubles Draws	(Spain) Alba Carrillo Marín (Bolivia) Noelia Zeballos; 6–3, 4–6, [10–6]	(Portugal) Francisca Jorge (Russia) Anna Ureke	(Finland) Anastasia Kulikova (Spain) Alba Carrillo Marín	(Spain) Rebeka Masarova (Switzerland) Bojana Klincov (Russia) Anna Ureke (Portugal) Francisca Jorge
May 20	Tacarigua, Trinidad and Tobago; Hard (indoor); W15; Singles and Doubles Draws	(Colombia) Yuliana Lizarazo; 6–7^{(9–11)}, 6–3, 6–1	(United States) Safiya Carrington	(United Kingdom) Alice Gillan (Venezuela) Nadia Echeverría Alam	(Trinidad and Tobago) Breana Stampfli (Poland) Olga Brózda (Netherlands) Lexie Stevens (United States) Sabastiani León
May 20	Tacarigua, Trinidad and Tobago; Hard (indoor); W15; Singles and Doubles Draws	(Venezuela) Nadia Echeverría Alam (United States) Sabastiani León; 6–4, 6–3	(Poland) Olga Brózda (Poland) Paulina Jastrzębska	(United Kingdom) Alice Gillan (Venezuela) Nadia Echeverría Alam	(Trinidad and Tobago) Breana Stampfli (Poland) Olga Brózda (Netherlands) Lexie Stevens (United States) Sabastiani León
May 20	Tabarka, Tunisia; Clay; W15; Singles and Doubles Draws	Tournament was cancelled after the completion of the quarterfinals due to ongoing poor weather		(United States) Chiara Scholl (Switzerland) Joanne Züger (Argentina) Eugenia Ganga (Chile) Bárbara Gatica	(Germany) Lena Lutzeier (Poland) Stefania Rogozińska Dzik (Spain) Noelia Bouzó Zanotti (Sweden) Louise Brunskog
May 20	Tabarka, Tunisia; Clay; W15; Singles and Doubles Draws	(Switzerland) Marie Mettraux / (Switzerland) Joanne Züger vs (Kazakhstan) Dariya Detkovskaya / (Poland) Stefania Rogozińska Dzik		(United States) Chiara Scholl (Switzerland) Joanne Züger (Argentina) Eugenia Ganga (Chile) Bárbara Gatica	(Germany) Lena Lutzeier (Poland) Stefania Rogozińska Dzik (Spain) Noelia Bouzó Zanotti (Sweden) Louise Brunskog
May 20	Antalya, Turkey; Clay; W15; Singles and Doubles Draws	(Australia) Seone Mendez; 6–1, 6–1	(Bulgaria) Gebriela Mihaylova	(Russia) Alina Silich (Serbia) Elena Milovanović	(Bulgaria) Dia Evtimova (Russia) Maria Shusharina (Turkey) Zeynep Sönmez (Kyrgyzstan) Ksenia Palkina
May 20	Antalya, Turkey; Clay; W15; Singles and Doubles Draws	(Switzerland) Chiara Grimm (Russia) Alina Silich; 6–4, 6–2	(Russia) Ekaterina Kazionova (Russia) Angelina Zhuravleva	(Russia) Alina Silich (Serbia) Elena Milovanović	(Bulgaria) Dia Evtimova (Russia) Maria Shusharina (Turkey) Zeynep Sönmez (Kyrgyzstan) Ksenia Palkina
May 27	Luzhou, China; Hard; W25; Singles and Doubles Draws	(China) Guo Hanyu; 6–2, 6–1	(China) Xun Fangying	(Chinese Taipei) Hsu Chieh-yu (China) Sun Ziyue	(Japan) Risa Ushijima (China) You Xiaodi (China) Guo Meiqi (China) Ye Qiuyu
May 27	Luzhou, China; Hard; W25; Singles and Doubles Draws	(China) Feng Shuo (China) Xun Fangying; 6–3, 6–1	(China) Guo Hanyu (China) Ye Qiuyu	(Chinese Taipei) Hsu Chieh-yu (China) Sun Ziyue	(Japan) Risa Ushijima (China) You Xiaodi (China) Guo Meiqi (China) Ye Qiuyu
May 27	Bredeney Ladies Open; Essen, Germany; Clay; W25; Singles and Doubles Draws	(Czech Republic) Tereza Martincová; 6–2, 7–6^{(7–4)}	(Spain) Paula Badosa	(Belgium) Marie Benoît (Italy) Martina Trevisan	(Germany) Anna Zaja (Poland) Maja Chwalińska (Romania) Elena-Gabriela Ruse (Belgium) Lara Salden
May 27	Bredeney Ladies Open; Essen, Germany; Clay; W25; Singles and Doubles Draws	(North Macedonia) Lina Gjorcheska (Russia) Anastasiya Komardina; 6–3, 6–3	(Russia) Alena Fomina (Czech Republic) Anastasia Zarycká	(Belgium) Marie Benoît (Italy) Martina Trevisan	(Germany) Anna Zaja (Poland) Maja Chwalińska (Romania) Elena-Gabriela Ruse (Belgium) Lara Salden
May 27	Hong Kong; Hard; W25; Singles and Doubles Draws	(Japan) Erina Hayashi; 6–3, 3–0, ret.	(China) Lu Jiajing	(Serbia) Jovana Jakšić (Hong Kong) Wu Ho-ching	(United States) Catherine Harrison (New Zealand) Paige Hourigan (Russia) Angelina Gabueva (Japan) Momoko Kobori
May 27	Hong Kong; Hard; W25; Singles and Doubles Draws	(Japan) Junri Namigata (Papua New Guinea) Abigail Tere-Apisah; 6–3, 2–6, [10–6]	(Japan) Erina Hayashi (Japan) Momoko Kobori	(Serbia) Jovana Jakšić (Hong Kong) Wu Ho-ching	(United States) Catherine Harrison (New Zealand) Paige Hourigan (Russia) Angelina Gabueva (Japan) Momoko Kobori
May 27	Grado, Italy; Clay; W25; Singles and Doubles Draws	(Slovakia) Rebecca Šramková; 7–6^{(7–3)}, 3–1, ret.	(Romania) Jaqueline Cristian	(Italy) Cristiana Ferrando (Italy) Martina Di Giuseppe	(Italy) Anastasia Grymalska (Hungary) Réka Luca Jani (China) Zhang Kailin (Turkey) Çağla Büyükakçay
May 27	Grado, Italy; Clay; W25; Singles and Doubles Draws	(Kazakhstan) Anna Danilina (Hungary) Réka Luca Jani; 6–2, 6–3	(Uzbekistan) Akgul Amanmuradova (Romania) Cristina Dinu	(Italy) Cristiana Ferrando (Italy) Martina Di Giuseppe	(Italy) Anastasia Grymalska (Hungary) Réka Luca Jani (China) Zhang Kailin (Turkey) Çağla Büyükakçay
May 27	Incheon, South Korea; Hard; W25; Singles and Doubles Draws	(South Korea) Han Na-lae; 6–3, 6–0	(Russia) Anastasia Gasanova	(Serbia) Natalija Kostić (South Korea) Jang Su-jeong	(United States) Hanna Chang (South Africa) Chanel Simmonds (Russia) Daria Mishina (China) Zhang Yuxuan
May 27	Incheon, South Korea; Hard; W25; Singles and Doubles Draws	(South Korea) Choi Ji-hee (South Korea) Han Na-lae; 6–3, 6–3	(Japan) Kanako Morisaki (Japan) Minori Yonehara	(Serbia) Natalija Kostić (South Korea) Jang Su-jeong	(United States) Hanna Chang (South Africa) Chanel Simmonds (Russia) Daria Mishina (China) Zhang Yuxuan
May 27	Santa Margarida de Montbui, Spain; Hard; W25; Singles and Doubles Draws	(Bulgaria) Elitsa Kostova; 7–5, 6–3	(Australia) Arina Rodionova	(Netherlands) Arantxa Rus (Argentina) Nadia Podoroska	(Spain) Andrea Lázaro García (Mexico) Renata Zarazúa (Spain) Guiomar Maristany (China) Wang Xiyu
May 27	Santa Margarida de Montbui, Spain; Hard; W25; Singles and Doubles Draws	(Georgia (country)) Sofia Shapatava (United Kingdom) Emily Webley-Smith; 6–4, 7–5	(Bulgaria) Elitsa Kostova (United Kingdom) Samantha Murray	(Netherlands) Arantxa Rus (Argentina) Nadia Podoroska	(Spain) Andrea Lázaro García (Mexico) Renata Zarazúa (Spain) Guiomar Maristany (China) Wang Xiyu
May 27	Nonthaburi, Thailand; Hard; W25; Singles and Doubles Draws	(Turkey) İpek Soylu; 7–6^{(7–1)}, 6–1	(China) Yuan Yue	(Uzbekistan) Sabina Sharipova (Russia) Kamilla Rakhimova	(Thailand) Chompoothip Jundakate (Switzerland) Simona Waltert (Thailand) Anchisa Chanta (Belgium) Magali Kempen
May 27	Nonthaburi, Thailand; Hard; W25; Singles and Doubles Draws	(Mexico) Victoria Rodríguez (Uzbekistan) Sabina Sharipova; 6–3, 6–4	(United States) Lorraine Guillermo (United States) Maegan Manasse	(Uzbekistan) Sabina Sharipova (Russia) Kamilla Rakhimova	(Thailand) Chompoothip Jundakate (Switzerland) Simona Waltert (Thailand) Anchisa Chanta (Belgium) Magali Kempen
May 27	Heraklion, Greece; Clay; W15; Singles and Doubles Draws	(Romania) Oana Gavrilă; 6–1, 6–3	(Croatia) Oleksandra Oliynykova	(Georgia (country)) Mariam Dalakishvili (Germany) Carmen Schultheiss	(Serbia) Tamara Malešević (Estonia) Elena Malõgina (Japan) Ange Oby Kajuru (Austria) Mira Antonitsch
May 27	Heraklion, Greece; Clay; W15; Singles and Doubles Draws	(Romania) Oana Gavrilă (Romania) Gabriela Nicole Tătăruș; 2–6, 6–4, [10–5]	(Greece) Anna Arkadianou (Greece) Adreanna Christopoulou	(Georgia (country)) Mariam Dalakishvili (Germany) Carmen Schultheiss	(Serbia) Tamara Malešević (Estonia) Elena Malõgina (Japan) Ange Oby Kajuru (Austria) Mira Antonitsch
May 27	Cancún, Mexico; Hard; W15; Singles and Doubles Draws	(Brazil) Thaisa Grana Pedretti; 6–4, 6–4	(Romania) Patricia Maria Țig	(Argentina) Melany Krywoj (Guatemala) Kirsten-Andrea Weedon	(Israel) Tamara Barad Itzhaki (Germany) Silvia Ambrosio (France) Tiphanie Fiquet (United States) Amy Zhu
May 27	Cancún, Mexico; Hard; W15; Singles and Doubles Draws	(Argentina) Paula Barañano (Argentina) Melany Krywoj; 6–2, 6–4	(Poland) Daria Kuczer (United Kingdom) Emilie Lindh	(Argentina) Melany Krywoj (Guatemala) Kirsten-Andrea Weedon	(Israel) Tamara Barad Itzhaki (Germany) Silvia Ambrosio (France) Tiphanie Fiquet (United States) Amy Zhu
May 27	Montemor-o-Novo, Portugal; Hard; W15; Singles and Doubles Draws	(Spain) Alba Carrillo Marín; 6–0, 4–6, 6–3	(Portugal) Francisca Jorge	(France) Marie Villet (Spain) Ángeles Moreno Barranquero	(Canada) Bianca Fernandez (Switzerland) Bojana Klincov (Portugal) Maria Inês Fonte (France) Amandine Cazeaux
May 27	Montemor-o-Novo, Portugal; Hard; W15; Singles and Doubles Draws	(Netherlands) Suzan Lamens (Russia) Anna Pribylova; 6–2, 2–6, [10–7]	(Portugal) Maria Inês Fonte (Portugal) Francisca Jorge	(France) Marie Villet (Spain) Ángeles Moreno Barranquero	(Canada) Bianca Fernandez (Switzerland) Bojana Klincov (Portugal) Maria Inês Fonte (France) Amandine Cazeaux
May 27	Tabarka, Tunisia; Clay; W15; Singles and Doubles Draws	(Egypt) Mayar Sherif; 6–4, 6–4	(Chile) Bárbara Gatica	(Argentina) Eugenia Ganga (Germany) Lena Lutzeier	(United States) Chiara Scholl (Switzerland) Marie Mettraux (Switzerland) Nina Stadler (Switzerland) Joanne Züger
May 27	Tabarka, Tunisia; Clay; W15; Singles and Doubles Draws	(Slovakia) Alica Rusová (Egypt) Mayar Sherif; 6–4, 4–6, [10–4]	(Germany) Lena Lutzeier (Switzerland) Nina Stadler	(Argentina) Eugenia Ganga (Germany) Lena Lutzeier	(United States) Chiara Scholl (Switzerland) Marie Mettraux (Switzerland) Nina Stadler (Switzerland) Joanne Züger

=== June ===
Week of	Tournament	Winner	Runners-up	Semifinalists	Quarterfinalists
June 3	Surbiton Trophy; Surbiton, United Kingdom; Grass; W100; Singles Draw – Doubles Draw	(United States) Alison Riske; 6–7^{(5–7)}, 6–2, 6–2	(Slovakia) Magdaléna Rybáriková	(United States) Caty McNally (Germany) Tatjana Maria	(Belgium) Alison Van Uytvanck (United Kingdom) Katy Dunne (United Kingdom) Heather Watson (Belgium) Yanina Wickmayer
June 3	Surbiton Trophy; Surbiton, United Kingdom; Grass; W100; Singles Draw – Doubles Draw	(United States) Jennifer Brady (United States) Caroline Dolehide; 6–3, 6–4	(United Kingdom) Heather Watson (Belgium) Yanina Wickmayer	(United States) Caty McNally (Germany) Tatjana Maria	(Belgium) Alison Van Uytvanck (United Kingdom) Katy Dunne (United Kingdom) Heather Watson (Belgium) Yanina Wickmayer
June 3	Internazionali Femminili di Brescia; Brescia, Italy; Clay; W60; Singles Draw – Doubles Draw	(Italy) Jasmine Paolini; 6–2, 6–1	(Latvia) Diāna Marcinkēviča	(Italy) Martina Trevisan (Italy) Deborah Chiesa	(Liechtenstein) Kathinka von Deichmann (United States) Louisa Chirico (Austria) Barbara Haas (Australia) Zoe Hives
June 3	Internazionali Femminili di Brescia; Brescia, Italy; Clay; W60; Singles Draw – Doubles Draw	(Venezuela) Andrea Gámiz (Brazil) Paula Cristina Gonçalves; 6–3, 4–6, [12–10]	(Italy) Anastasia Grymalska (Italy) Giorgia Marchetti	(Italy) Martina Trevisan (Italy) Deborah Chiesa	(Liechtenstein) Kathinka von Deichmann (United States) Louisa Chirico (Austria) Barbara Haas (Australia) Zoe Hives
June 3	Bella Cup; Toruń, Poland; Clay; W60+H; Singles Draw – Doubles Draw	(Slovakia) Rebecca Šramková; 6–1, 6–2	(Ukraine) Marta Kostyuk	(Romania) Irina Bara (United States) Allie Kiick	(Czech Republic) Anastasia Zarycká (Romania) Nicoleta Dascălu (Ukraine) Anhelina Kalinina (Montenegro) Danka Kovinić
June 3	Bella Cup; Toruń, Poland; Clay; W60+H; Singles Draw – Doubles Draw	(Spain) Rebeka Masarova (Slovakia) Rebecca Šramková; 6–4, 3–6, [10–4]	(United States) Robin Anderson (Ukraine) Anhelina Kalinina	(Romania) Irina Bara (United States) Allie Kiick	(Czech Republic) Anastasia Zarycká (Romania) Nicoleta Dascălu (Ukraine) Anhelina Kalinina (Montenegro) Danka Kovinić
June 3	Minsk, Belarus; Clay; W25; Singles and Doubles Draws	(United Kingdom) Francesca Jones; 6–3, 1–6, 6–2	(Germany) Stephanie Wagner	(France) Estelle Cascino (North Macedonia) Lina Gjorcheska	(Italy) Martina Colmegna (Czech Republic) Anastasia Dețiuc (Belarus) Iryna Shymanovich (Romania) Irina Fetecău
June 3	Minsk, Belarus; Clay; W25; Singles and Doubles Draws	(Italy) Martina Colmegna (Norway) Ulrikke Eikeri; 1–6, 6–4, [10–6]	(Russia) Amina Anshba (Czech Republic) Anastasia Dețiuc	(France) Estelle Cascino (North Macedonia) Lina Gjorcheska	(Italy) Martina Colmegna (Czech Republic) Anastasia Dețiuc (Belarus) Iryna Shymanovich (Romania) Irina Fetecău
June 3	Shenzhen, China; Hard; W25; Singles and Doubles Draws	(China) Wang Xinyu; 6–1, 6–0	(China) Xun Fangying	(Thailand) Peangtarn Plipuech (Japan) Chihiro Muramatsu	(United States) Maegan Manasse (Slovakia) Zuzana Zlochová (Serbia) Jovana Jakšić (Japan) Akiko Omae
June 3	Shenzhen, China; Hard; W25; Singles and Doubles Draws	(China) Guo Hanyu (China) Ye Qiuyu; 1–6, 7–6^{(7–4)}, [11–9]	(China) Chen Jiahui (China) Wu Meixu	(Thailand) Peangtarn Plipuech (Japan) Chihiro Muramatsu	(United States) Maegan Manasse (Slovakia) Zuzana Zlochová (Serbia) Jovana Jakšić (Japan) Akiko Omae
June 3	Daegu, South Korea; Hard; W25; Singles and Doubles Draws	(South Korea) Han Na-lae; 6–1, 6–2	(Japan) Haruna Arakawa	(Japan) Mari Osaka (South Korea) Jang Su-jeong	(China) You Xiaodi (South Korea) Kim Da-bin (United States) Jennifer Elie (South Korea) Jeong Su-nam
June 3	Daegu, South Korea; Hard; W25; Singles and Doubles Draws	(Chinese Taipei) Hsieh Yu-chieh (Chinese Taipei) Lee Pei-chi; 6–3, 7–6^{(7–5)}	(South Korea) Choi Ji-hee (South Korea) Han Na-lae	(Japan) Mari Osaka (South Korea) Jang Su-jeong	(China) You Xiaodi (South Korea) Kim Da-bin (United States) Jennifer Elie (South Korea) Jeong Su-nam
June 3	Bethany Beach, United States; Clay; W25; Singles and Doubles Draws	(United States) Usue Maitane Arconada; 6–1, 6–1	(United States) Natasha Subhash	(Bosnia and Herzegovina) Dea Herdželaš (Switzerland) Tess Sugnaux	(United States) Sophie Chang (Bulgaria) Petia Arshinkova (Australia) Belinda Woolcock (United States) Katerina Stewart
June 3	Bethany Beach, United States; Clay; W25; Singles and Doubles Draws	(United States) Usue Maitane Arconada (United States) Hayley Carter; 6–4, 6–4	(Bosnia and Herzegovina) Dea Herdželaš (Slovakia) Tereza Mihalíková	(Bosnia and Herzegovina) Dea Herdželaš (Switzerland) Tess Sugnaux	(United States) Sophie Chang (Bulgaria) Petia Arshinkova (Australia) Belinda Woolcock (United States) Katerina Stewart
June 3	Fergana Challenger; Fergana, Uzbekistan; Hard; W25; Singles and Doubles Draws	(Russia) Kamilla Rakhimova; 6–1, 7–5	(Russia) Valeriya Yushchenko	(Paraguay) Montserrat González (Russia) Anastasia Zakharova	(Uzbekistan) Sabina Sharipova (Kazakhstan) Gozal Ainitdinova (Belarus) Sadafmoh Tolibova (India) Riya Bhatia
June 3	Fergana Challenger; Fergana, Uzbekistan; Hard; W25; Singles and Doubles Draws	(Uzbekistan) Nigina Abduraimova (Turkey) Berfu Cengiz; 4–6, 6–1, [10–3]	(Australia) Isabella Bozicevic (Russia) Ksenia Laskutova	(Paraguay) Montserrat González (Russia) Anastasia Zakharova	(Uzbekistan) Sabina Sharipova (Kazakhstan) Gozal Ainitdinova (Belarus) Sadafmoh Tolibova (India) Riya Bhatia
June 3	Banja Luka, Bosnia and Herzegovina; Clay; W15; Singles and Doubles Draws	(Austria) Mira Antonitsch; 6–3, 6–3	(Czech Republic) Barbora Miklová	(Serbia) Draginja Vuković (Czech Republic) Aneta Laboutková	(Slovenia) Nika Radišič (Bosnia and Herzegovina) Nefisa Berberović (Czech Republic) Denisa Hindová (Israel) Vlada Ekshibarova
June 3	Banja Luka, Bosnia and Herzegovina; Clay; W15; Singles and Doubles Draws	(Bosnia and Herzegovina) Nefisa Berberović (Slovenia) Veronika Erjavec; 6–1, 6–3	(Czech Republic) Barbora Miklová (Serbia) Elena Milovanović	(Serbia) Draginja Vuković (Czech Republic) Aneta Laboutková	(Slovenia) Nika Radišič (Bosnia and Herzegovina) Nefisa Berberović (Czech Republic) Denisa Hindová (Israel) Vlada Ekshibarova
June 3	Cancún, Mexico; Hard; W15; Singles and Doubles Draws	(Romania) Patricia Maria Țig; 6–0, 6–0	(Mexico) Fernanda Contreras	(United States) Solymar Colling (Argentina) Melany Krywoj	(United Kingdom) Tanysha Dissanayake (United Kingdom) Emilie Lindh (United States) Zoë Gwen Scandalis (United States) Alyssa Tobita
June 3	Cancún, Mexico; Hard; W15; Singles and Doubles Draws	(Mexico) Fernanda Contreras (Mexico) Jessica Hinojosa Gómez; 2–6, 6–4, [10–7]	(Argentina) Melany Krywoj (Chile) Fernanda Labraña	(United States) Solymar Colling (Argentina) Melany Krywoj	(United Kingdom) Tanysha Dissanayake (United Kingdom) Emilie Lindh (United States) Zoë Gwen Scandalis (United States) Alyssa Tobita
June 3	Tabarka, Tunisia; Clay; W15; Singles and Doubles Draws	(Egypt) Mayar Sherif; 6–3, 6–2	(Switzerland) Nina Stadler	(Russia) Anna Ukolova (France) Irys Ekani	(Portugal) Inês Murta (Slovakia) Ingrid Vojčináková (France) Léa Tholey (France) Alice Ramé
June 3	Tabarka, Tunisia; Clay; W15; Singles and Doubles Draws	(South Africa) Natasha Fourouclas (Slovakia) Ingrid Vojčináková; 3–6, 6–4, [10–8]	(Chile) Bárbara Gatica (Brazil) Rebeca Pereira	(Russia) Anna Ukolova (France) Irys Ekani	(Portugal) Inês Murta (Slovakia) Ingrid Vojčináková (France) Léa Tholey (France) Alice Ramé
June 10	Manchester Trophy; Manchester, United Kingdom; Grass; W100; Singles Draw – Doubles Draw	(Poland) Magda Linette; 7–6^{(7–1)}, 2–6, 6–3	(Kazakhstan) Zarina Diyas	(United Kingdom) Samantha Murray (United States) Madison Brengle	(Australia) Lizette Cabrera (United Kingdom) Naomi Broady (China) Wang Xiyu (Canada) Katherine Sebov
June 10	Manchester Trophy; Manchester, United Kingdom; Grass; W100; Singles Draw – Doubles Draw	(China) Duan Yingying (China) Zhu Lin; 6–4, 6–3	(United States) Robin Anderson (Romania) Laura Ioana Paar	(United Kingdom) Samantha Murray (United States) Madison Brengle	(Australia) Lizette Cabrera (United Kingdom) Naomi Broady (China) Wang Xiyu (Canada) Katherine Sebov
June 10	Torneo Internazionale Femminile Antico Tiro a Volo; Rome, Italy; Clay; W60+H; Singles Draw – Doubles Draw	(Italy) Sara Errani; 6–1, 6–4	(Austria) Barbara Haas	(Russia) Varvara Flink (Switzerland) Conny Perrin	(Italy) Jessica Pieri (United States) Francesca Di Lorenzo (Japan) Nao Hibino (Norway) Ulrikke Eikeri
June 10	Torneo Internazionale Femminile Antico Tiro a Volo; Rome, Italy; Clay; W60+H; Singles Draw – Doubles Draw	(Italy) Elisabetta Cocciaretto (Romania) Nicoleta Dascălu; 7–5, 4–6, [10–7]	(Brazil) Carolina Alves (Romania) Elena Bogdan	(Russia) Varvara Flink (Switzerland) Conny Perrin	(Italy) Jessica Pieri (United States) Francesca Di Lorenzo (Japan) Nao Hibino (Norway) Ulrikke Eikeri
June 10	Trofeu Internacional Ciutat de Barcelona; Barcelona, Spain; Clay; W60; Singles Draw – Doubles Draw	(United States) Allie Kiick; 7–6^{(7–3)}, 3–6, 6–1	(Turkey) Çağla Büyükakçay	(Netherlands) Richèl Hogenkamp (Australia) Jaimee Fourlis	(Serbia) Nina Stojanović (Spain) Irene Burillo Escorihuela (Romania) Irina Bara (China) Han Xinyun
June 10	Trofeu Internacional Ciutat de Barcelona; Barcelona, Spain; Clay; W60; Singles Draw – Doubles Draw	(Japan) Kyōka Okamura (Japan) Moyuka Uchijima; 7–6^{(9–7)}, 6–4	(Spain) Marina Bassols Ribera (Spain) Yvonne Cavallé Reimers	(Netherlands) Richèl Hogenkamp (Australia) Jaimee Fourlis	(Serbia) Nina Stojanović (Spain) Irene Burillo Escorihuela (Romania) Irina Bara (China) Han Xinyun
June 10	Minsk, Belarus; Clay; W25; Singles and Doubles Draws	(United Kingdom) Francesca Jones; 7–6^{(8–6)}, 4–6, 6–1	(Romania) Jaqueline Cristian	(Belarus) Iryna Shymanovich (Romania) Irina Fetecău	(Romania) Georgia Crăciun (Sweden) Mirjam Björklund (Russia) Anastasiya Komardina (Moldova) Alexandra Perper
June 10	Minsk, Belarus; Clay; W25; Singles and Doubles Draws	(North Macedonia) Lina Gjorcheska (Russia) Anastasiya Komardina; 6–7^{(4–7)}, 6–4, [10–8]	(Belarus) Ilona Kremen (Belarus) Iryna Shymanovich	(Belarus) Iryna Shymanovich (Romania) Irina Fetecău	(Romania) Georgia Crăciun (Sweden) Mirjam Björklund (Russia) Anastasiya Komardina (Moldova) Alexandra Perper
June 10	Hengyang, China; Hard; W25; Singles and Doubles Draws	(China) Wang Xinyu; 6–4, 6–3	(China) Sun Ziyue	(China) Liu Fangzhou (China) Yuan Yue	(China) Wei Sijia (China) Zheng Wushuang (United States) Maegan Manasse (Sweden) Jacqueline Cabaj Awad
June 10	Hengyang, China; Hard; W25; Singles and Doubles Draws	(China) You Xiaodi (China) Zhang Ying; 6–1, 6–0	(China) Sun Xuliu (China) Zhao Qianqian	(China) Liu Fangzhou (China) Yuan Yue	(China) Wei Sijia (China) Zheng Wushuang (United States) Maegan Manasse (Sweden) Jacqueline Cabaj Awad
June 10	Přerov, Czech Republic; Clay; W25; Singles and Doubles Draws	(Ukraine) Anhelina Kalinina; 6–1, 4–6, 6–1	(Bulgaria) Elitsa Kostova	(Romania) Miriam Bulgaru (United Kingdom) Amanda Carreras	(Colombia) Camila Osorio (Romania) Gabriela Talabă (Liechtenstein) Kathinka von Deichmann (Slovakia) Chantal Škamlová
June 10	Přerov, Czech Republic; Clay; W25; Singles and Doubles Draws	(Czech Republic) Karolína Kubáňová (Czech Republic) Nikola Tomanová; 6–4, 7–6^{(7–2)}	(Czech Republic) Kateřina Mandelíková (Russia) Anna Morgina	(Romania) Miriam Bulgaru (United Kingdom) Amanda Carreras	(Colombia) Camila Osorio (Romania) Gabriela Talabă (Liechtenstein) Kathinka von Deichmann (Slovakia) Chantal Škamlová
June 10	Akko, Israel; Hard; W25; Singles and Doubles Draws	(Switzerland) Susan Bandecchi; 6–4, 6–2	(Israel) Julia Glushko	(Mexico) Ana Sofía Sánchez (Switzerland) Leonie Küng	(Ukraine) Daria Snigur (France) Victoria Muntean (Russia) Valeriya Yushchenko (Argentina) Nadia Podoroska
June 10	Akko, Israel; Hard; W25; Singles and Doubles Draws	(Croatia) Silvia Njirić (Turkey) İpek Soylu; 6–2, 6–0	(Israel) Shelly Bereznyak (Kazakhstan) Yekaterina Dmitrichenko	(Mexico) Ana Sofía Sánchez (Switzerland) Leonie Küng	(Ukraine) Daria Snigur (France) Victoria Muntean (Russia) Valeriya Yushchenko (Argentina) Nadia Podoroska
June 10	Sumter, United States; Hard; W25; Singles and Doubles Draws	(United States) Hailey Baptiste; 6–2, 7–5	(United States) Victoria Duval	(United States) Katharine Fahey (United States) Natasha Subhash	(United States) Usue Maitane Arconada (United States) Sophie Chang (Bosnia and Herzegovina) Dea Herdželaš (Mexico) Marcela Zacarías
June 10	Sumter, United States; Hard; W25; Singles and Doubles Draws	(United States) Brynn Boren (United States) Caitlin Whoriskey; 6–4, 6–4	(Montenegro) Vladica Babić (United States) Hayley Carter	(United States) Katharine Fahey (United States) Natasha Subhash	(United States) Usue Maitane Arconada (United States) Sophie Chang (Bosnia and Herzegovina) Dea Herdželaš (Mexico) Marcela Zacarías
June 10	Kaltenkirchen, Germany; Clay; W15; Singles and Doubles Draws	(Japan) Yuki Naito; 4–6, 6–4, 6–0	(Denmark) Clara Tauson	(Japan) Natsumi Kawaguchi (Argentina) Catalina Pella	(Switzerland) Chiara Grimm (Romania) Oana Georgeta Simion (Czech Republic) Michaela Bayerlová (Netherlands) Eva Vedder
June 10	Kaltenkirchen, Germany; Clay; W15; Singles and Doubles Draws	(Australia) Gabriella Da Silva-Fick (Germany) Anna Klasen; 6–4, 7–5	(Uzbekistan) Albina Khabibulina (Romania) Oana Georgeta Simion	(Japan) Natsumi Kawaguchi (Argentina) Catalina Pella	(Switzerland) Chiara Grimm (Romania) Oana Georgeta Simion (Czech Republic) Michaela Bayerlová (Netherlands) Eva Vedder
June 10	Cancún, Mexico; Hard; W15; Singles and Doubles Draws	(Romania) Patricia Maria Țig; 6–2, 4–6, 6–3	(Argentina) Melany Krywoj	(United States) Solymar Colling (Mexico) Fernanda Contreras	(Japan) Yuka Hosoki (United States) Alyssa Tobita (Chile) Fernanda Labraña (France) Tiphanie Fiquet
June 10	Cancún, Mexico; Hard; W15; Singles and Doubles Draws	(Mexico) Fernanda Contreras (Mexico) Nazari Urbina; 3–6, 6–4, [10–3]	(France) Tiphanie Fiquet (Poland) Daria Kuczer	(United States) Solymar Colling (Mexico) Fernanda Contreras	(Japan) Yuka Hosoki (United States) Alyssa Tobita (Chile) Fernanda Labraña (France) Tiphanie Fiquet
June 10	Amarante, Portugal; Hard; W15; Singles and Doubles Draws	(Republic of Ireland) Georgia Drummy; 7–6^{(7–4)}, 6–3	(Lithuania) Justina Mikulskytė	(France) Lou Brouleau (Czech Republic) Karolína Beránková	(United States) Christina Rosca (Spain) Ainhoa Atucha Gómez (Portugal) Maria Inês Fonte (Spain) Alba Carrillo Marín
June 10	Amarante, Portugal; Hard; W15; Singles and Doubles Draws	(Portugal) Francisca Jorge (Spain) Olga Parres Azcoitia; 6–4, 2–6, [12–10]	(Republic of Ireland) Georgia Drummy (United States) Christina Rosca	(France) Lou Brouleau (Czech Republic) Karolína Beránková	(United States) Christina Rosca (Spain) Ainhoa Atucha Gómez (Portugal) Maria Inês Fonte (Spain) Alba Carrillo Marín
June 10	Gimcheon, South Korea; Hard; W15; Singles and Doubles Draws	(South Korea) Lee Eun-hye; 6–3, 6–3	(Japan) Misaki Matsuda	(Japan) Shiori Fukuda (South Korea) Jeong Su-nam	(Russia) Daria Mishina (Japan) Ayumi Koshiishi (South Korea) Kim Da-ye (South Korea) Lee So-ra
June 10	Gimcheon, South Korea; Hard; W15; Singles and Doubles Draws	(Japan) Ayumi Koshiishi (Russia) Daria Mishina; 6–3, 6–2	(Japan) Kanako Morisaki (Japan) Ayaka Okuno	(Japan) Shiori Fukuda (South Korea) Jeong Su-nam	(Russia) Daria Mishina (Japan) Ayumi Koshiishi (South Korea) Kim Da-ye (South Korea) Lee So-ra
June 10	Tabarka, Tunisia; Clay; W15; Singles and Doubles Draws	(France) Margaux Rouvroy; 6–4, 6–3	(Colombia) María Paulina Pérez	(Russia) Maria Marfutina (Argentina) Eugenia Ganga	(Czech Republic) Martina Kudelová (Russia) Yana Mogilnitskaya (France) Léa Tholey (Bolivia) Noelia Zeballos
June 10	Tabarka, Tunisia; Clay; W15; Singles and Doubles Draws	(Spain) Noelia Bouzó Zanotti (Bolivia) Noelia Zeballos; 6–0, 6–3	(Russia) Maria Marfutina (Ukraine) Anastasiya Poplavska	(Russia) Maria Marfutina (Argentina) Eugenia Ganga	(Czech Republic) Martina Kudelová (Russia) Yana Mogilnitskaya (France) Léa Tholey (Bolivia) Noelia Zeballos
June 10	Wesley Chapel, United States; Clay; W15; Singles and Doubles Draws	(Argentina) María Lourdes Carlé; 6–3, 6–1	(United States) Victoria Emma	(United States) Allura Zamarripa (United States) Lauren Proctor	(United States) Tori Kinard (United States) Anna Sinclair Rogers (Australia) Giorgie Jones (United States) Megan McCray
June 10	Wesley Chapel, United States; Clay; W15; Singles and Doubles Draws	(United States) Allura Zamarripa (United States) Maribella Zamarripa; 3–6, 6–4, [13–11]	(United States) Kylie Collins (United States) Sofia Sewing	(United States) Allura Zamarripa (United States) Lauren Proctor	(United States) Tori Kinard (United States) Anna Sinclair Rogers (Australia) Giorgie Jones (United States) Megan McCray
June 17	Ilkley Trophy; Ilkley, United Kingdom; Grass; W100; Singles Draw – Doubles Draw	(Romania) Monica Niculescu; 6–2, 4–6, 6–3	(Hungary) Tímea Babos	(Netherlands) Bibiane Schoofs (Slovakia) Jana Čepelová	(Brazil) Beatriz Haddad Maia (Russia) Anna Blinkova (Paraguay) Verónica Cepede Royg (Czech Republic) Tereza Smitková
June 17	Ilkley Trophy; Ilkley, United Kingdom; Grass; W100; Singles Draw – Doubles Draw	(Brazil) Beatriz Haddad Maia (Brazil) Luisa Stefani; 6–4, 6–7^{(5–7)}, [10–4]	(Australia) Ellen Perez (Australia) Arina Rodionova	(Netherlands) Bibiane Schoofs (Slovakia) Jana Čepelová	(Brazil) Beatriz Haddad Maia (Russia) Anna Blinkova (Paraguay) Verónica Cepede Royg (Czech Republic) Tereza Smitková
June 17	Macha Lake Open; Staré Splavy, Czech Republic; Clay; W60+H; Singles Draw – Doubles Draw	(Czech Republic) Barbora Krejčíková; 6–2, 6–3	(Czech Republic) Denisa Allertová	(Romania) Laura Ioana Paar (Romania) Alexandra Cadanțu	(Argentina) Paula Ormaechea (Ukraine) Anhelina Kalinina (Czech Republic) Lucie Hradecká (Belarus) Olga Govortsova
June 17	Macha Lake Open; Staré Splavy, Czech Republic; Clay; W60+H; Singles Draw – Doubles Draw	(Russia) Natela Dzalamidze (Serbia) Nina Stojanović; 6–3, 6–3	(Japan) Kyōka Okamura (Serbia) Dejana Radanović	(Romania) Laura Ioana Paar (Romania) Alexandra Cadanțu	(Argentina) Paula Ormaechea (Ukraine) Anhelina Kalinina (Czech Republic) Lucie Hradecká (Belarus) Olga Govortsova
June 17	Open Montpellier Méditerranée Métropole Hérault; Montpellier, France; Clay; W25+H; Singles and Doubles Draws	(Russia) Varvara Gracheva; 6–4, 6–2	(United States) Elizabeth Halbauer	(France) Diane Parry (France) Harmony Tan	(France) Irina Ramialison (Russia) Marina Melnikova (Spain) Olga Sáez Larra (Belgium) Lara Salden
June 17	Open Montpellier Méditerranée Métropole Hérault; Montpellier, France; Clay; W25+H; Singles and Doubles Draws	(Russia) Marina Melnikova (Netherlands) Eva Wacanno; 4–6, 6–4, [10–3]	(Uzbekistan) Albina Khabibulina (Germany) Julia Wachaczyk	(France) Diane Parry (France) Harmony Tan	(France) Irina Ramialison (Russia) Marina Melnikova (Spain) Olga Sáez Larra (Belgium) Lara Salden
June 17	Jakarta, Indonesia; Hard; W25; Singles and Doubles Draws	(Japan) Risa Ozaki; 6–4, 6–1	(Netherlands) Arianne Hartono	(Japan) Hiroko Kuwata (Japan) Momoko Kobori	(Japan) Risa Ushijima (Thailand) Nudnida Luangnam (Thailand) Peangtarn Plipuech (Japan) Miharu Imanishi
June 17	Jakarta, Indonesia; Hard; W25; Singles and Doubles Draws	(Japan) Haruka Kaji (Japan) Junri Namigata; 6–2, 4–6, [10–7]	(Indonesia) Beatrice Gumulya (Indonesia) Jessy Rompies	(Japan) Hiroko Kuwata (Japan) Momoko Kobori	(Japan) Risa Ushijima (Thailand) Nudnida Luangnam (Thailand) Peangtarn Plipuech (Japan) Miharu Imanishi
June 17	Padua, Italy; Clay; W25; Singles and Doubles Draws	(Italy) Martina Caregaro; 6–4, 6–4	(Brazil) Paula Cristina Gonçalves	(Italy) Bianca Turati (Italy) Tatiana Pieri	(Italy) Federica Di Sarra (Italy) Martina Colmegna (Brazil) Gabriela Cé (Italy) Lucia Bronzetti
June 17	Padua, Italy; Clay; W25; Singles and Doubles Draws	(Romania) Cristina Dinu (Italy) Angelica Moratelli; 7–6^{(9–7)}, 3–6, [10–8]	(Brazil) Carolina Alves (Brazil) Gabriela Cé	(Italy) Bianca Turati (Italy) Tatiana Pieri	(Italy) Federica Di Sarra (Italy) Martina Colmegna (Brazil) Gabriela Cé (Italy) Lucia Bronzetti
June 17	Figueira da Foz, Portugal; Hard; W25+H; Singles and Doubles Draws	(Turkey) İpek Soylu; 6–7^{(2–7)}, 7–6^{(7–5)}, 6–3	(Canada) Katherine Sebov	(Norway) Ulrikke Eikeri (France) Océane Dodin	(Latvia) Diāna Marcinkēviča (Germany) Katharina Hobgarski (Japan) Mai Hontama (Spain) Cristina Bucșa
June 17	Figueira da Foz, Portugal; Hard; W25+H; Singles and Doubles Draws	(Portugal) Francisca Jorge (Spain) Olga Parres Azcoitia; 6–4, 4–6, [11–9]	(Brazil) Laura Pigossi (Japan) Moyuka Uchijima	(Norway) Ulrikke Eikeri (France) Océane Dodin	(Latvia) Diāna Marcinkēviča (Germany) Katharina Hobgarski (Japan) Mai Hontama (Spain) Cristina Bucșa
June 17	Madrid, Spain; Hard; W25; Singles and Doubles Draws	(Egypt) Mayar Sherif; 6–2, 6–3	(Spain) Eva Guerrero Álvarez	(Japan) Yuriko Lily Miyazaki (Japan) Mari Osaka	(Turkey) Çağla Büyükakçay (Spain) Guiomar Maristany (Mexico) Ana Sofía Sánchez (China) Zheng Qinwen
June 17	Madrid, Spain; Hard; W25; Singles and Doubles Draws	(Russia) Polina Monova (Russia) Yana Sizikova; 6–4, 6–2	(Japan) Ange Oby Kajuru (Slovakia) Laura Maluniaková	(Japan) Yuriko Lily Miyazaki (Japan) Mari Osaka	(Turkey) Çağla Büyükakçay (Spain) Guiomar Maristany (Mexico) Ana Sofía Sánchez (China) Zheng Qinwen
June 17	Ystad, Sweden; Clay; W25; Singles and Doubles Draws	(Montenegro) Danka Kovinić; 2–6, 6–3, 6–3	(Netherlands) Richèl Hogenkamp	(Russia) Anastasiya Komardina (Sweden) Mirjam Björklund	(Denmark) Clara Tauson (North Macedonia) Lina Gjorcheska (Croatia) Iva Primorac (Germany) Jule Niemeier
June 17	Ystad, Sweden; Clay; W25; Singles and Doubles Draws	(United Kingdom) Emily Arbuthnott (Kazakhstan) Anna Danilina; 3–6, 6–2, [10–4]	(North Macedonia) Lina Gjorcheska (Russia) Anastasiya Komardina	(Russia) Anastasiya Komardina (Sweden) Mirjam Björklund	(Denmark) Clara Tauson (North Macedonia) Lina Gjorcheska (Croatia) Iva Primorac (Germany) Jule Niemeier
June 17	Klosters, Switzerland; Clay; W25; Singles and Doubles Draws	(Austria) Julia Grabher; 6–1, 6–3	(Brazil) Nathaly Kurata	(Czech Republic) Michaela Bayerlová (Japan) Yuki Naito	(Switzerland) Lisa Sabino (Bulgaria) Dia Evtimova (Switzerland) Joanne Züger (Italy) Lucrezia Stefanini
June 17	Klosters, Switzerland; Clay; W25; Singles and Doubles Draws	(Switzerland) Lisa Sabino (Italy) Gaia Sanesi; 3–6, 6–1, [10–6]	(Switzerland) Leonie Küng (Bulgaria) Isabella Shinikova	(Czech Republic) Michaela Bayerlová (Japan) Yuki Naito	(Switzerland) Lisa Sabino (Bulgaria) Dia Evtimova (Switzerland) Joanne Züger (Italy) Lucrezia Stefanini
June 17	Denver, United States; Hard; W25; Singles and Doubles Draws	(United States) Usue Maitane Arconada; 6–4, 2–6, 6–3	(United States) Alexa Glatch	(United States) Sophia Whittle (Bulgaria) Gergana Topalova	(United States) Victoria Duval (United States) Hayley Carter (Bulgaria) Petia Arshinkova (United States) Sanaz Marand
June 17	Denver, United States; Hard; W25; Singles and Doubles Draws	(Montenegro) Vladica Babić (United States) Hayley Carter; 6–2, 6–3	(United States) Brynn Boren (United States) Gail Brodsky	(United States) Sophia Whittle (Bulgaria) Gergana Topalova	(United States) Victoria Duval (United States) Hayley Carter (Bulgaria) Petia Arshinkova (United States) Sanaz Marand
June 17	Netanya, Israel; Hard; W15; Singles and Doubles Draws	(Russia) Anastasia Zakharova; 6–2, 2–0, ret.	(Russia) Ekaterina Vishnevskaya	(Israel) Nicole Khirin (Israel) Shahar Biran	(France) Lou Adler (Lithuania) Iveta Dapkutė (Kazakhstan) Yekaterina Dmitrichenko (Israel) Lina Glushko
June 17	Netanya, Israel; Hard; W15; Singles and Doubles Draws	(Kazakhstan) Yekaterina Dmitrichenko (Russia) Anastasia Zakharova; 6–0, 6–4	(Israel) Shelly Bereznyak (Israel) Lina Glushko	(Israel) Nicole Khirin (Israel) Shahar Biran	(France) Lou Adler (Lithuania) Iveta Dapkutė (Kazakhstan) Yekaterina Dmitrichenko (Israel) Lina Glushko
June 17	Gimcheon, South Korea; Hard; W15; Singles and Doubles Draws	(Japan) Shiori Fukuda; 6–2, 4–6, 7–5	(South Korea) Jeong Su-nam	(South Korea) Lee So-ra (South Korea) Kim Da-hye	(Japan) Ayaka Okuno (Denmark) Olga Helmi (South Korea) Lee Eun-hye (Japan) Sakura Hosogi
June 17	Gimcheon, South Korea; Hard; W15; Singles and Doubles Draws	(Japan) Kanako Morisaki (Japan) Ayaka Okuno; 6–7^{(5–7)}, 6–0, [10–2]	(South Korea) Jung So-hee (South Korea) Lee So-ra	(South Korea) Lee So-ra (South Korea) Kim Da-hye	(Japan) Ayaka Okuno (Denmark) Olga Helmi (South Korea) Lee Eun-hye (Japan) Sakura Hosogi
June 17	Tabarka, Tunisia; Clay; W15; Singles and Doubles Draws	(Argentina) Julieta Lara Estable; 4–6, 6–4, 6–4	(Argentina) Eugenia Ganga	(France) Carla Touly (Italy) Anna Turati	(Bulgaria) Julia Stamatova (Serbia) Elena Milovanović (France) Salma Djoubri (Spain) Ángela Fita Boluda
June 17	Tabarka, Tunisia; Clay; W15; Singles and Doubles Draws	(France) Carla Touly (Italy) Anna Turati; 6–2, 6–3	(Argentina) Julieta Lara Estable (Colombia) María Paulina Pérez	(France) Carla Touly (Italy) Anna Turati	(Bulgaria) Julia Stamatova (Serbia) Elena Milovanović (France) Salma Djoubri (Spain) Ángela Fita Boluda
June 17	Orlando, United States; Clay; W15; Singles and Doubles Draws	(United States) Natasha Subhash; 6–1, 6–2	(United States) Tori Kinard	(United States) Grace Min (United States) Karina Miller	(United States) Sofia Sewing (United States) Kimmi Hance (United States) Connie Ma (United States) Eleana Yu
June 17	Orlando, United States; Clay; W15; Singles and Doubles Draws	(United States) Allura Zamarripa (United States) Maribella Zamarripa; 6–3, 6–1	(United States) Kimmi Hance (United States) Ashlyn Krueger	(United States) Grace Min (United States) Karina Miller	(United States) Sofia Sewing (United States) Kimmi Hance (United States) Connie Ma (United States) Eleana Yu
June 24	Naiman, China; Hard; W25; Singles and Doubles Draws	(China) You Xiaodi; 6–3, 6–3	(China) Gao Xinyu	(Bulgaria) Aleksandrina Naydenova (China) Feng Shuo	(Serbia) Jovana Jakšić (Russia) Anastasia Gasanova (China) Sun Ziyue (Japan) Hiroko Kuwata
June 24	Naiman, China; Hard; W25; Singles and Doubles Draws	(China) Guo Meiqi (China) Wu Meixu; 6–4, 7–6^{(7–5)}	(China) Chen Jiahui (China) Zheng Wushuang	(Bulgaria) Aleksandrina Naydenova (China) Feng Shuo	(Serbia) Jovana Jakšić (Russia) Anastasia Gasanova (China) Sun Ziyue (Japan) Hiroko Kuwata
June 24	Périgueux, France; Clay; W25; Singles and Doubles Draws	(France) Tessah Andrianjafitrimo; 6–7^{(5–7)}, 6–2, 6–2	(France) Alice Ramé	(France) Harmony Tan (Russia) Varvara Gracheva	(Latvia) Diāna Marcinkēviča (France) Mallaurie Noël (France) Marine Partaud (Romania) Cristina Ene
June 24	Périgueux, France; Clay; W25; Singles and Doubles Draws	(Chile) Bárbara Gatica (Brazil) Rebeca Pereira; 6–4, 6–2	(Colombia) María Herazo González (Latvia) Diāna Marcinkēviča	(France) Harmony Tan (Russia) Varvara Gracheva	(Latvia) Diāna Marcinkēviča (France) Mallaurie Noël (France) Marine Partaud (Romania) Cristina Ene
June 24	Darmstadt, Germany; Clay; W25; Singles and Doubles Draws	(Belarus) Olga Govortsova; 6–1, 7–6^{(7–3)}	(Denmark) Clara Tauson	(Germany) Stephanie Wagner (Germany) Katharina Hobgarski	(Germany) Yana Morderger (Russia) Anastasiya Komardina (Austria) Julia Grabher (Germany) Jule Niemeier
June 24	Darmstadt, Germany; Clay; W25; Singles and Doubles Draws	(Germany) Vivian Heisen (Germany) Katharina Hobgarski; 6–7^{(4–7)}, 6–2, [10–4]	(Germany) Lena Lutzeier (Germany) Natalia Siedliska	(Germany) Stephanie Wagner (Germany) Katharina Hobgarski	(Germany) Yana Morderger (Russia) Anastasiya Komardina (Austria) Julia Grabher (Germany) Jule Niemeier
June 24	Tarvisio, Italy; Clay; W25; Singles and Doubles Draws	(Italy) Bianca Turati; 6–3, 6–1	(Brazil) Paula Cristina Gonçalves	(Brazil) Gabriela Cé (Hungary) Réka Luca Jani	(Croatia) Tena Lukas (Romania) Miriam Bulgaru (Australia) Jaimee Fourlis (Slovenia) Pia Čuk
June 24	Tarvisio, Italy; Clay; W25; Singles and Doubles Draws	(Brazil) Gabriela Cé (Brazil) Paula Cristina Gonçalves; 6–2, 4–6, [10–3]	(Italy) Gloria Ceschi (United States) Rasheeda McAdoo	(Brazil) Gabriela Cé (Hungary) Réka Luca Jani	(Croatia) Tena Lukas (Romania) Miriam Bulgaru (Australia) Jaimee Fourlis (Slovenia) Pia Čuk
June 24	Budapest, Hungary; Clay; W15; Singles and Doubles Draws	(Hungary) Vanda Lukács; 6–3, 2–6, 6–3	(Slovakia) Chantal Škamlová	(Turkey) İpek Öz (Slovenia) Nika Radišič	(Switzerland) Lisa Sabino (Poland) Anna Hertel (Czech Republic) Nikola Břečková (Japan) Satsuki Takamura
June 24	Budapest, Hungary; Clay; W15; Singles and Doubles Draws	(Turkey) İpek Öz (Turkey) Melis Sezer; 6–3, 4–6, [15–13]	(Czech Republic) Kristýna Hrabalová (Slovakia) Laura Svatíková	(Turkey) İpek Öz (Slovenia) Nika Radišič	(Switzerland) Lisa Sabino (Poland) Anna Hertel (Czech Republic) Nikola Břečková (Japan) Satsuki Takamura
June 24	Jakarta, Indonesia; Hard; W15; Singles and Doubles Draws	(Netherlands) Arianne Hartono; 6–2, 6–3	(Indonesia) Rifanty Kahfiani	(Japan) Michika Ozeki (Indonesia) Aldila Sutjiadi	(Indonesia) Jessy Rompies (China) Ma Yexin (Japan) Ramu Ueda (Japan) Sakura Hondo
June 24	Jakarta, Indonesia; Hard; W15; Singles and Doubles Draws	(Netherlands) Arianne Hartono (Indonesia) Nadia Ravita; 2–6, 6–4, [11–9]	(South Africa) Lee Barnard (South Africa) Zani Barnard	(Japan) Michika Ozeki (Indonesia) Aldila Sutjiadi	(Indonesia) Jessy Rompies (China) Ma Yexin (Japan) Ramu Ueda (Japan) Sakura Hondo
June 24	Cancún, Mexico; Hard; W15; Singles and Doubles Draws	(Canada) Layne Sleeth; 6–2, 6–1	(Brazil) Thaisa Grana Pedretti	(United States) Elle Christensen (Australia) Ramona Mataruga	(United States) Gianna Pielet (United States) Madison Westby (United States) Alyssa Tobita (United States) Jessica Failla
June 24	Cancún, Mexico; Hard; W15; Singles and Doubles Draws	(France) Tiphanie Fiquet (France) Léolia Jeanjean; 6–4, 6–4	(United States) Hind Abdelouahid (United States) Alyssa Tobita	(United States) Elle Christensen (Australia) Ramona Mataruga	(United States) Gianna Pielet (United States) Madison Westby (United States) Alyssa Tobita (United States) Jessica Failla
June 24	Alkmaar, Netherlands; Clay; W15; Singles and Doubles Draws	(Netherlands) Suzan Lamens; 7–5, 6–2	(Sweden) Marina Yudanov	(Russia) Anastasia Pribylova (Netherlands) Eva Vedder	(United Kingdom) Emily Arbuthnott (Norway) Astrid Wanja Brune Olsen (Netherlands) Lexie Stevens (France) Mylène Halemai
June 24	Alkmaar, Netherlands; Clay; W15; Singles and Doubles Draws	(United Kingdom) Emily Arbuthnott (Australia) Gabriella Da Silva-Fick; 6–4, 1–6, [10–8]	(Netherlands) Eva Vedder (Netherlands) Stéphanie Visscher	(Russia) Anastasia Pribylova (Netherlands) Eva Vedder	(United Kingdom) Emily Arbuthnott (Norway) Astrid Wanja Brune Olsen (Netherlands) Lexie Stevens (France) Mylène Halemai
June 24	Madrid, Spain; Hard; W15; Singles and Doubles Draws	(Spain) Yvonne Cavallé Reimers; 7–6^{(7–4)}, 5–7, 7–6^{(7–3)}	(Romania) Ioana Loredana Roșca	(China) Zheng Qinwen (Bulgaria) Julia Terziyska	(Spain) Lidia Moreno Arias (Spain) Alba Rey García (Israel) Vlada Ekshibarova (Sweden) Jacqueline Cabaj Awad
June 24	Madrid, Spain; Hard; W15; Singles and Doubles Draws	(Lithuania) Justina Mikulskytė (United States) Christina Rosca; 6–3, 6–7^{(8–10)}, [10–8]	(Romania) Ioana Loredana Roșca (Bulgaria) Julia Terziyska	(China) Zheng Qinwen (Bulgaria) Julia Terziyska	(Spain) Lidia Moreno Arias (Spain) Alba Rey García (Israel) Vlada Ekshibarova (Sweden) Jacqueline Cabaj Awad
June 24	Tabarka, Tunisia; Clay; W15; Singles and Doubles Draws	(Italy) Anna Turati; 6–2, 6–1	(Sweden) Fanny Östlund	(Italy) Nuria Brancaccio (France) Salma Djoubri	(Russia) Yana Mogilnitskaya (Austria) Yvonne Neuwirth (Argentina) Martina Capurro Taborda (France) Constance Sibille
June 24	Tabarka, Tunisia; Clay; W15; Singles and Doubles Draws	(Sweden) Fanny Östlund (Sweden) Alexandra Viktorovitch; 6–3, 2–6, [10–8]	(Argentina) Martina Capurro Taborda (Italy) Anna Turati	(Italy) Nuria Brancaccio (France) Salma Djoubri	(Russia) Yana Mogilnitskaya (Austria) Yvonne Neuwirth (Argentina) Martina Capurro Taborda (France) Constance Sibille
June 24	Shreveport, United States; Clay; W15; Singles and Doubles Draws	(Chinese Taipei) Hsu Chieh-yu; 6–2, 6–3	(United States) Alycia Parks	(Slovenia) Nastja Kolar (United States) Jennifer Elie	(United States) Alexa Graham (Georgia (country)) Salome Devidze (United States) Peyton Stearns (United States) Chelsea Kung
June 24	Shreveport, United States; Clay; W15; Singles and Doubles Draws	(Montenegro) Vladica Babić (Chinese Taipei) Hsu Chieh-yu; 6–2, 6–0	(United States) Jennifer Elie (Australia) Alexandra Osborne	(Slovenia) Nastja Kolar (United States) Jennifer Elie	(United States) Alexa Graham (Georgia (country)) Salome Devidze (United States) Peyton Stearns (United States) Chelsea Kung
