= 2019 Torneig Internacional Els Gorchs – Doubles =

Doubles
- 2019 Torneig Internacional Els Gorchs

Final
- Champions: (France) Jessika Ponchet (United Kingdom) Eden Silva
- Runners-up: (United Kingdom) Jodie Anna Burrage (United Kingdom) Olivia Nicholls
- Score: 6–3, 6–4

Events
Singles	Doubles
- Torneig Internacional Els Gorchs

Giuliana Olmos and Laura Pigossi were the defending champions, but both players chose not to participate.

Jessika Ponchet and Eden Silva won the title, defeating Jodie Anna Burrage and Olivia Nicholls in the final, 6–3, 6–4.

== Seeds ==
1. (France) Elixane Lechemia / (India) Prarthana Thombare (first round)
2. (Greece) Despina Papamichail / (Serbia) Nina Stojanović (quarterfinals)
3. (Croatia) Jana Fett / (United States) Maria Sanchez (first round)
4. (Venezuela) Andrea Gámiz / (Bulgaria) Elitsa Kostova (first round)

== Draw ==
Key

- Q = Qualifier
- WC = Wild card
- LL = Lucky loser
- Alt = Alternate
- ITF = ITF entry
- PR = Protected ranking
- SR = Special ranking
- SE = Special exempt
- JE = Junior exempt
- JR = Junior Accelerator Programme entrant
- CO = College Accelerator Programme entrant
- NG = Next Gen Accelerator Program entrant
- w/o = Walkover
- r = Retired
- d = Defaulted

=== Draw ===
First round
1	(France) E Lechemia (India) P Thombare	6	4	[10]
WC	(Spain) O Parres Azcoitia (Romania) IL Roșca	2	6	[12]
(Georgia (country)) M Bolkvadze (United Kingdom) E Webley-Smith	6	6
WC	(Spain) F Arrese Mata (Spain) G Lairón Navarro	1	3
3	(Croatia) J Fett (United States) M Sanchez	6	4	[5]
(France) J Ponchet (United Kingdom) E Silva	3	6	[10]
WC	(Spain) A Alegre (Spain) MA Teixidó García	1	3
(Spain) E Guerrero Álvarez (Spain) G Maristany	6	6
(Germany) K Hobgarski (Russia) M Melnikova	5	3
(United Kingdom) JA Burrage (United Kingdom) O Nicholls	7	6
(Spain) C Bucșa (Sweden) L Malmqvist	1	7	[11]
4	(Venezuela) A Gámiz (Bulgaria) E Kostova	6	5	[9]
(Spain) I Burillo Escorihuela (Spain) N Párrizas Díaz	6	4	[8]
(Russia) A Gasanova (Bulgaria) A Naydenova	0	6	[10]
(Spain) Y Cavallé Reimers (Spain) C Hoste Ferrer	2	4
2	(Greece) D Papamichail (Serbia) N Stojanović	6	6

Quarterfinals
WC	(Spain) O Parres Azcoitia (Romania) IL Roșca	3	3
(Georgia (country)) M Bolkvadze (United Kingdom) E Webley-Smith	6	6
(France) J Ponchet (United Kingdom) E Silva	6	6
(Spain) E Guerrero Álvarez (Spain) G Maristany	3	4
(United Kingdom) JA Burrage (United Kingdom) O Nicholls	6	7
(Spain) C Bucșa (Sweden) L Malmqvist	4	5
(Russia) A Gasanova (Bulgaria) A Naydenova	6	6
2	(Greece) D Papamichail (Serbia) N Stojanović	2	2

Semifinals
(Georgia (country)) M Bolkvadze (United Kingdom) E Webley-Smith	4	1
(France) J Ponchet (United Kingdom) E Silva	6	6
(United Kingdom) JA Burrage (United Kingdom) O Nicholls	6	4	[10]
(Russia) A Gasanova (Bulgaria) A Naydenova	3	6	[8]

Final
(France) J Ponchet (United Kingdom) E Silva	6	6
(United Kingdom) JA Burrage (United Kingdom) O Nicholls	3	4
