= 2019 Torneig Internacional Els Gorchs =

- Date: 29 April–5 May 2019
- Edition: 9th
- Category: ITF Women's World Tennis Tour
- Prize money: $60,000
- Surface: Hard
- Location: Les Franqueses del Vallès, Spain

Champions

Singles
- (United Kingdom) Katy Dunne

Doubles
- (France) Jessika Ponchet / (United Kingdom) Eden Silva
- Torneig Internacional Els Gorchs

The 2019 Torneig Internacional Els Gorchs was a professional tennis tournament played on outdoor hard courts. It was the ninth edition of the tournament which was part of the 2019 ITF Women's World Tennis Tour. It took place in Les Franqueses del Vallès, Spain between 29 April and 5 May 2019.

== Singles main-draw entrants ==
=== Seeds ===
Country	Player	Rank^{1}	Seed
ESP	Paula Badosa Gibert	125	1
FRA	Jessika Ponchet	200	2
GEO	Mariam Bolkvadze	222	3
SRB	Nina Stojanović	247	4
BUL	Elitsa Kostova	251	5
GER	Katharina Hobgarski	259	6
RUS	Marina Melnikova	274	7
ESP	Cristina Bucșa	275	8

- ^{1} Rankings are as of 22 April 2019.

=== Other entrants ===
The following players received wildcards into the singles main draw:

- (Spain) Paula Badosa Gibert
- (Spain) Marina Bassols Ribera
- (Spain) Irene Burillo Escorihuela
- (Spain) Marta Custic

The following player received entry using a protected ranking:

- (France) Océane Dodin

The following players received entry from the qualifying draw:

- (Switzerland) Susan Bandecchi
- (France) Lou Brouleau
- (Canada) Gabriela Dabrowski
- (Spain) María Gutiérrez Carrasco
- (Australia) Ivana Popovic
- (Romania) Ioana Loredana Roșca
- (United Kingdom) Eden Silva
- (France) Lucie Wargnier

== Champions ==
=== Singles ===
- (United Kingdom) Katy Dunne def. (Spain) Paula Badosa Gibert, 7–5, 6–3

=== Doubles ===
- (France) Jessika Ponchet / (United Kingdom) Eden Silva def. (United Kingdom) Jodie Anna Burrage / (United Kingdom) Olivia Nicholls, 6–3, 6–4
