= 2019 Torneig Internacional Els Gorchs – Singles =

Singles
- 2019 Torneig Internacional Els Gorchs

Final
- Champion: (United Kingdom) Katy Dunne
- Runner-up: (Spain) Paula Badosa Gibert
- Score: 7–5, 6–3

Events
Singles	Doubles
- Torneig Internacional Els Gorchs

Paula Badosa Gibert was the defending champion, but lost in the final to Katy Dunne, 7–5, 6–3.

== Seeds ==
1. (Spain) Paula Badosa Gibert (final)
2. (France) Jessika Ponchet (first round)
3. (Georgia (country)) Mariam Bolkvadze (quarterfinals)
4. (Serbia) Nina Stojanović (quarterfinals)
5. (Bulgaria) Elitsa Kostova (quarterfinals)
6. (Germany) Katharina Hobgarski (first round)
7. (Russia) Marina Melnikova (first round)
8. (Spain) Cristina Bucșa (semifinals)

== Draw ==
Key

- Q = Qualifier
- WC = Wild card
- LL = Lucky loser
- Alt = Alternate
- ITF = ITF entry
- PR = Protected ranking
- SR = Special ranking
- SE = Special exempt
- JE = Junior exempt
- JR = Junior Accelerator Programme entrant
- CO = College Accelerator Programme entrant
- NG = Next Gen Accelerator Program entrant
- w/o = Walkover
- r = Retired
- d = Defaulted

=== Finals ===
Semifinals
1/WC	(Spain) Paula Badosa Gibert	6	7
8	(Spain) Cristina Bucșa	4	5
(United Kingdom) Katy Dunne	4	7	6
(United Kingdom) Jodie Anna Burrage	6	5	2

Final
1/WC	(Spain) Paula Badosa Gibert	5	3
(United Kingdom) Katy Dunne	7	6

=== Top half ===
First round
1/WC	(Spain) P Badosa Gibert	6	6
Q	(France) L Wargnier	2	3
(Venezuela) A Gámiz	1	1
Q	(Canada) G Dabrowski	6	6
(Russia) A Gasanova	2	6	3
(Croatia) J Fett	6	3	6
Q	(Switzerland) S Bandecchi	6	6
6	(Germany) K Hobgarski	4	2
3	(Georgia (country)) M Bolkvadze	6	6
PR	(France) O Dodin	3	2
(Spain) N Párrizas Díaz	6	6
WC	(Spain) M Bassols Ribera	2	3
(United States) M Sanchez	7^{7}	6
WC	(Spain) I Burillo Escorihuela	6^{5}	3
(Spain) G Maristany	4	6^{2}
8	(Spain) C Bucșa	6	7^{7}

Second round
1/WC	(Spain) P Badosa Gibert	7	7^{7}
Q	(Canada) G Dabrowski	5	6^{5}
(Croatia) J Fett	5	6	6^{5}
Q	(Switzerland) S Bandecchi	7	4	7^{7}
3	(Georgia (country)) M Bolkvadze	6	6
(Spain) N Párrizas Díaz	3	1
(United States) M Sanchez	1	1
8	(Spain) C Bucșa	6	6

Quarterfinals
1/WC	(Spain) P Badosa Gibert	6	0	7
Q	(Switzerland) S Bandecchi	2	6	5
3	(Georgia (country)) M Bolkvadze	3	6	3
8	(Spain) C Bucșa	6	4	6

Semifinals
1/WC	(Spain) P Badosa Gibert	6	7
8	(Spain) C Bucșa	4	5

=== Bottom half ===
First round
7	(Russia) M Melnikova	6^{4}	6	2
Q	(Spain) M Gutiérrez Carrasco	7^{7}	3	6
Q	(United Kingdom) E Silva	3	4
(United Kingdom) K Dunne	6	6
Q	(Romania) IL Roșca	3	6	6
WC	(Spain) M Custic	6	3	3
(Italy) S Rubini	4	1
4	(Serbia) N Stojanović	6	6
5	(Bulgaria) E Kostova	6	6
Q	(Australia) I Popovic	1	3
(Spain) E Guerrero Álvarez	7	6
Q	(France) L Brouleau	5	3
(France) S Reix	2^{r}
(Spain) E Cabeza Candela	2
(United Kingdom) JA Burrage	2	6	6
2	(France) J Ponchet	6	1	4

Second round
Q	(Spain) M Gutiérrez Carrasco	3	2
(United Kingdom) K Dunne	6	6
Q	(Romania) IL Roșca	4	2
4	(Serbia) N Stojanović	6	6
5	(Bulgaria) E Kostova	6	6
(Spain) E Guerrero Álvarez	2	4
(Spain) E Cabeza Candela	2	0^{r}
(United Kingdom) JA Burrage	6	0

Quarterfinals
(United Kingdom) K Dunne	3	6	7
4	(Serbia) N Stojanović	6	2	5
5	(Bulgaria) E Kostova	3	2
(United Kingdom) JA Burrage	6	6

Semifinals
(United Kingdom) K Dunne	4	7	6
(United Kingdom) JA Burrage	6	5	2
