= 2018 Braidy Industries Women's Tennis Classic =

- Date: 23–29 July
- Edition: 6th
- Category: ITF Women's Circuit
- Prize money: $60,000
- Surface: Hard
- Location: Ashland, United States

Champions

Singles
- (United States) Gail Brodsky

Doubles
- (Serbia) Jovana Jakšić / (Mexico) Renata Zarazúa
← 2008 ·	Braidy Industries Women's Tennis Classic	· 2019 →

The 2018 Braidy Industries Women's Tennis Classic was a professional tennis tournament played on outdoor hard courts. It was the sixth edition of the tournament and was part of the 2018 ITF Women's Circuit. It took place in Ashland, United States, on 23–29 July 2018. It was the first edition of the tournament since 2008.

== Singles main draw entrants ==
=== Seeds ===
Country	Player	Rank^{1}	Seed
USA	Caroline Dolehide	102	1
JPN	Nao Hibino	113	2
RUS	Sofya Zhuk	131	3
USA	Kristie Ahn	152	4
AUS	Olivia Rogowska	153	5
USA	Jamie Loeb	154	6
USA	Grace Min	169	7
JPN	Mayo Hibi	187	8

- ^{1} Rankings as of 16 July 2018.

=== Other entrants ===
The following player received a wildcard into the singles main draw:

- (United States) Hayley Carter

The following player received entry by a junior exempt:

- (United States) Whitney Osuigwe

The following players received entry from the qualifying draw:

- (United States) Gail Brodsky
- (United States) Catherine Harrison
- (United States) Maegan Manasse
- (United States) Anastasia Nefedova

The following player received entry as a lucky loser:

- (United States) Amanda Rodgers

== Champions ==
=== Singles ===
- (United States) Gail Brodsky def. (United States) Maegan Manasse, 4–6, 6–1, 6–0

=== Doubles ===
- (Serbia) Jovana Jakšić / (Mexico) Renata Zarazúa def. (United States) Sanaz Marand / (United States) Whitney Osuigwe, 6–3, 5–7, [10–4]
