= 2018 Braidy Industries Women's Tennis Classic – Doubles =

Doubles
- 2018 Braidy Industries Women's Tennis Classic

Final
- Champions: (Serbia) Jovana Jakšić (Mexico) Renata Zarazúa
- Runners-up: (United States) Sanaz Marand (United States) Whitney Osuigwe
- Score: 6–3, 5–7, [10–4]

Events
Singles	Doubles
← 2008 ·	Braidy Industries Women's Tennis Classic	· 2019 →

Līga Dekmeijere and Jelena Pandžić were the defending champions, having won the previous event in 2008. However, Dekmeijere has been inactive on the women's tour since 2015, while Pandžić retired from the professional circuit in 2017.

Jovana Jakšić and Renata Zarazúa won the title after defeating Sanaz Marand and Whitney Osuigwe 6–3, 5–7, [10–4] in the final.

== Seeds ==
1. (United States) Alexandra Mueller / (Brazil) Luisa Stefani (quarterfinals)
2. (South Africa) Chanel Simmonds / (Papua New Guinea) Abigail Tere-Apisah (semifinals)
3. (Serbia) Jovana Jakšić / (Mexico) Renata Zarazúa (champions)
4. (Australia) Alison Bai / (United States) Ashley Weinhold (first round)

== Draw ==
=== Key ===
- Q = Qualifier
- WC = Wild card
- LL = Lucky loser
- Alt = Alternate
- SE = Special exempt
- PR = Protected ranking
- ITF = ITF entry
- JE = Junior exempt
- w/o = Walkover
- r = Retired
- d = Defaulted
- SR = Special ranking

=== Draw ===
First round
(United States) B Boren (United States) G Brodsky	6	6
(United States) A Crump (United States) R Small	0	2
4	(Australia) A Bai (United States) A Weinhold	3	1
(United States) E Bektas (Australia) K Birrell	6	6
(United States) M Kobelt (United States) A Nefedova	5	3
(United States) S Marand (United States) W Osuigwe	7	6
(Russia) A Gabueva (United States) A Rodgers	6	5	[10]
(United States) A Parks (United States) A Smith	4	7	[5]
(United States) K Ahn (United States) L Guillermo	3	6	[6]
3	(Serbia) J Jakšić (Mexico) R Zarazúa	6	1	[10]
(United States) H Carter (United States) E Shibahara	5	2
(United States) J Elbaba (United States) M Manasse	7	6

Quarterfinals
1	(United States) A Mueller (Brazil) L Stefani	6^{5}	4
(United States) B Boren (United States) G Brodsky	7^{7}	6
(United States) E Bektas (Australia) K Birrell	2	5
(United States) S Marand (United States) W Osuigwe	6	7
(Russia) A Gabueva (United States) A Rodgers	1	0
3	(Serbia) J Jakšić (Mexico) R Zarazúa	6	6
(United States) J Elbaba (United States) M Manasse	5	2
2	(South Africa) C Simmonds (Papua New Guinea) A Tere-Apisah	7	6

Semifinals
(United States) B Boren (United States) G Brodsky	5	3
(United States) S Marand (United States) W Osuigwe	7	6
3	(Serbia) J Jakšić (Mexico) R Zarazúa	2	6	[10]
2	(South Africa) C Simmonds (Papua New Guinea) A Tere-Apisah	6	4	[4]

Final
(United States) S Marand (United States) W Osuigwe	3	7	[4]
3	(Serbia) J Jakšić (Mexico) R Zarazúa	6	5	[10]
