= 2019 Braidy Industries Women's Tennis Classic – Doubles =

Women's tennis tournament

Doubles
- 2019 Braidy Industries Women's Tennis Classic

Final
- Champions: (United States) Sanaz Marand (United States) Caitlin Whoriskey
- Runners-up: (Montenegro) Vladica Babić (Sweden) Julia Rosenqvist
- Score: 7–6^{(7–4)}, 6–4

Events
Singles	Doubles
← 2018 ·	Braidy Industries Women's Tennis Classic	· 2020 →

Jovana Jakšić and Renata Zarazúa were the defending champions, but both players chose not to participate.

Sanaz Marand and Caitlin Whoriskey won the title, defeating wildcards Vladica Babić and Julia Rosenqvist in the final, 7–6^{(7–4)}, 6–4.

== Seeds ==
1. (United States) Hayley Carter / (United States) Maegan Manasse (semifinals)
2. (Chinese Taipei) Hsieh Yu-chieh / (China) You Xiaodi (first round)
3. (Chinese Taipei) Chen Pei-hsuan / (Chinese Taipei) Wu Fang-hsien (first round)
4. (United States) Robin Anderson / (United States) Madison Brengle (first round)

== Draw ==
=== Key ===
- Q = Qualifier
- WC = Wild card
- LL = Lucky loser
- Alt = Alternate
- SE = Special exempt
- PR = Protected ranking
- ITF = ITF entry
- JE = Junior exempt
- w/o = Walkover
- r = Retired
- d = Defaulted
- SR = Special ranking

=== Draw ===
First round
1	(United States) H Carter (United States) M Manasse	6	6
(Australia) Z Hives (Romania) G Talabă	1	1
(United States) A Li (United States) J Loeb	4	4
(United States) B Boren (United States) G Brodsky	6	6
4	(United States) R Anderson (United States) M Brengle	6^{5}	2
WC	(Montenegro) V Babić (Sweden) J Rosenqvist	7^{7}	6
(United States) E Bektas (United States) C Harrison	6	6
(United States) L Guillermo (United States) A Nefedova	3	4
(Oman) F Al-Nabhani (Russia) A Gabueva	2	4
(United States) S Marand (United States) C Whoriskey	6	6
(Chinese Taipei) E-s Liang (Japan) A Okuno	7^{7}	3	[11]
3	(Chinese Taipei) P-h Chen (Chinese Taipei) F-h Wu	6^{5}	6	[9]
(United States) M Sanchez (United Kingdom) K Swan	6	6
WC	(United States) A Parks (United States) E Turner	1	4
(South Korea) N-l Han (South Korea) D-b Kim	7	7^{7}
2	(Chinese Taipei) Y-c Hsieh (China) X You	5	6^{1}

Quarterfinals
1	(United States) H Carter (United States) M Manasse	6	6^{5}	[10]
(United States) B Boren (United States) G Brodsky	2	7^{7}	[8]
WC	(Montenegro) V Babić (Sweden) J Rosenqvist	w/o
(United States) E Bektas (United States) C Harrison
(United States) S Marand (United States) C Whoriskey	7^{7}	6
(Chinese Taipei) E-s Liang (Japan) A Okuno	6^{4}	4
(United States) M Sanchez (United Kingdom) K Swan	7^{7}	6
(South Korea) N-l Han (South Korea) D-b Kim	6^{2}	3

Semifinals
1	(United States) H Carter (United States) M Manasse	6^{5}	1
WC	(Montenegro) V Babić (Sweden) J Rosenqvist	7^{7}	6
(United States) S Marand (United States) C Whoriskey	6	6
(United States) M Sanchez (United Kingdom) K Swan	2	2

Final
WC	(Montenegro) V Babić (Sweden) J Rosenqvist	6^{4}	4
(United States) S Marand (United States) C Whoriskey	7^{7}	6
