= 2018 Braidy Industries Women's Tennis Classic – Singles =

Singles
- 2018 Braidy Industries Women's Tennis Classic

Final
- Champion: (United States) Gail Brodsky
- Runner-up: (United States) Maegan Manasse
- Score: 4–6, 6–1, 6–0

Events
Singles	Doubles
← 2008 ·	Braidy Industries Women's Tennis Classic	· 2019 →

Varvara Lepchenko was the defending champion, having won the previous event in 2008, but decided not to participate this year.

Gail Brodsky won the title, defeating fellow qualifier Maegan Manasse in the final, 4–6, 6–1, 6–0.

== Seeds ==
1. (United States) Caroline Dolehide (quarterfinals, withdrew)
2. (Japan) Nao Hibino (quarterfinals, retired)
3. (Russia) Sofya Zhuk (second round)
4. (United States) Kristie Ahn (second round)
5. (Australia) Olivia Rogowska (first round)
6. (United States) Jamie Loeb (second round)
7. (United States) Grace Min (second round)
8. (Japan) Mayo Hibi (first round)

== Draw ==
=== Key ===
- Q = Qualifier
- WC = Wild card
- LL = Lucky loser
- Alt = Alternate
- SE = Special exempt
- PR = Protected ranking
- ITF = ITF entry
- JE = Junior exempt
- w/o = Walkover
- r = Retired
- d = Defaulted
- SR = Special ranking

=== Finals ===
Semifinals
(Japan) Misaki Doi	6^{3}	6	2
Q	(United States) Maegan Manasse	7^{7}	4	6
(Serbia) Jovana Jakšić	2	4
Q	(United States) Gail Brodsky	6	6

Final
Q	(United States) Maegan Manasse	6	1	0
Q	(United States) Gail Brodsky	4	6	6

=== Top half ===
First round
1	(United States) C Dolehide	2	6	6
(United States) V Duval	6	2	1
(United States) L Chirico	2	3
(Canada) F Abanda	6	6
(Japan) M Doi	6	6
(Australia) K Birrell	2	2
WC	(United States) H Carter	0	6	1
7	(United States) G Min	6	4	6
4	(United States) K Ahn	6	4	6
(United States) A Muhammad	2	6	4
(United States) H Chang	0	3
(United States) S Marand	6	6
(Australia) A Bai	2	1
LL	(United States) A Rodgers	6	6
Q	(United States) M Manasse	7^{7}	6
8	(Japan) M Hibi	6^{2}	0

Second round
1	(United States) C Dolehide	6^{3}	6	6
(Canada) F Abanda	7^{7}	3	3
(Japan) M Doi	6	3	6
7	(United States) G Min	3	6	4
4	(United States) K Ahn	6	4	5
(United States) S Marand	4	6	7
LL	(United States) A Rodgers	5	6	1
Q	(United States) M Manasse	7	3	6

Quarterfinals
1	(United States) C Dolehide
(Japan) M Doi	w/o
(United States) S Marand	6	3	1
Q	(United States) M Manasse	4	6	6

Semifinals
(Japan) M Doi	6^{3}	6	2
Q	(United States) M Manasse	7^{7}	4	6

=== Bottom half ===
First round
6	(United States) J Loeb	3	6	6
(United States) A Li	6	4	2
(Serbia) J Jakšić	6	6
(South Africa) C Simmonds	2	1
(Mexico) R Zarazúa	5
Q	(United States) C Harrison	2^{r}
Q	(United States) A Nefedova	6	3	3
3	(Russia) S Zhuk	3	6	6
5	(Australia) O Rogowska	3	6	5
Q	(United States) G Brodsky	6	4	7
(United States) J Elbaba	6	4	6
(Papua New Guinea) A Tere-Apisah	4	6	4
JE	(United States) W Osuigwe	6	3	7^{7}
(United States) E Bektas	2	6	6^{3}
(Colombia) E Arango	2	1
2	(Japan) N Hibino	6	6

Second round
6	(United States) J Loeb	2	1
(Serbia) J Jakšić	6	6
(Mexico) R Zarazúa	4	6	6
3	(Russia) S Zhuk	6	3	3
Q	(United States) G Brodsky	6	6
(United States) J Elbaba	4	4
JE	(United States) W Osuigwe	2	4
2	(Japan) N Hibino	6	6

Quarterfinals
(Serbia) J Jakšić	6	6
(Mexico) R Zarazúa	2	3
Q	(United States) G Brodsky	2
2	(Japan) N Hibino	1^{r}

Semifinals
(Serbia) J Jakšić	2	4
Q	(United States) G Brodsky	6	6
