= 2019 Braidy Industries Women's Tennis Classic – Singles =

Singles
- 2019 Braidy Industries Women's Tennis Classic

Final
- Champion: (Australia) Ellen Perez
- Runner-up: (Australia) Zoe Hives
- Score: 6–2, 3–2, ret.

Events
Singles	Doubles
← 2018 ·	Braidy Industries Women's Tennis Classic	· 2020 →

Gail Brodsky was the defending champion, but lost in the second round to Katie Swan.

Ellen Perez won the title after her compatriot Zoe Hives retired in the final at 6–2, 3–2.

== Seeds ==
1. (United States) Madison Brengle (second round, retired)
2. (Russia) Anna Kalinskaya (first round)
3. (United States) Ann Li (quarterfinals)
4. (South Korea) Han Na-lae (second round)
5. (United States) Robin Anderson (semifinals)
6. (Chinese Taipei) Liang En-shuo (first round)
7. (Australia) Ellen Perez (champion)
8. (Australia) Zoe Hives (final, retired)

== Draw ==
=== Key ===
- Q = Qualifier
- WC = Wild card
- LL = Lucky loser
- Alt = Alternate
- SE = Special exempt
- PR = Protected ranking
- ITF = ITF entry
- JE = Junior exempt
- w/o = Walkover
- r = Retired
- d = Defaulted
- SR = Special ranking

=== Finals ===
Semifinals
7	(Australia) Ellen Perez	7^{8}	0	6
(United Kingdom) Katie Swan	6^{6}	6	3
8	(Australia) Zoe Hives	6	4	6
5	(United States) Robin Anderson	2	6	2

Final
7	(Australia) Ellen Perez	6	3
8	(Australia) Zoe Hives	2	2^{r}

=== Top half ===
First round
1	(United States) M Brengle	6	6
WC	(United States) J Elie	3	3
Q	(United States) L Guillermo	3	1
(United States) M Manasse	6	6
Q	(Japan) A Okuno	4	2
(United States) C Harrison	6	6
Q	(United States) A Nefedova	5	3
7	(Australia) E Perez	7	6
3	(United States) A Li	6	6
WC	(United States) H Carter	3	2
(United States) M Sanchez	6	6
Q	(Oman) F Al-Nabhani	4	0
(United Kingdom) K Swan	6	4	7
(Poland) M Fręch	2	6	5
(United States) G Brodsky	6	6
6	(Chinese Taipei) E-s Liang	0	4

Second round
1	(United States) M Brengle	1^{r}
(United States) M Manasse	5
(United States) C Harrison	6	3	2
7	(Australia) E Perez	1	6	6
3	(United States) A Li	6	6
(United States) M Sanchez	1	2
(United Kingdom) K Swan	6	6
(United States) G Brodsky	1	2

Quarterfinals
(United States) M Manasse	2	3
7	(Australia) E Perez	6	6
3	(United States) A Li	2	6	4
(United Kingdom) K Swan	6	4	6

Semifinals
7	(Australia) E Perez	7^{8}	0	6
(United Kingdom) K Swan	6^{6}	6	3

=== Bottom half ===
First round
8	(Australia) Z Hives	6	0
(United States) K Day	0	0^{r}
(China) Y Zhang	5	6	3
Q	(Australia) A Myers	7	3	6
(Romania) G Talabă	4	7	0
Q	(United States) H Chang	6	5	6
WC	(United States) V Duval	4	6	3
4	(South Korea) N-l Han	6	3	6
5	(United States) R Anderson	6	6
LL	(Russia) A Gabueva	1	2
(China) X You	6	7
WC	(United States) P Stearns	2	5
(United States) J Loeb	2	4
Q	(Montenegro) V Babić	6	6
Q	(United States) A Glatch	6	6
2	(Russia) A Kalinskaya	4	4

Second round
8	(Australia) Z Hives	6	6
Q	(Australia) A Myers	3	4
Q	(United States) H Chang	6^{2}	6	6
4	(South Korea) N-l Han	7^{7}	2	1
5	(United States) R Anderson	6	6
(China) X You	4	0
Q	(Montenegro) V Babić	1	2
Q	(United States) A Glatch	6	6

Quarterfinals
8	(Australia) Z Hives	6	6
Q	(United States) H Chang	1	3
5	(United States) R Anderson	6	6
Q	(United States) A Glatch	3	3

Semifinals
8	(Australia) Z Hives	6	4	6
5	(United States) R Anderson	2	6	2
