= 2019 Innisbrook Open – Doubles =

Doubles
- 2019 Innisbrook Open

Final
- Champions: (United States) Quinn Gleason (United States) Ingrid Neel
- Runners-up: (Uzbekistan) Akgul Amanmuradova (Australia) Lizette Cabrera
- Score: 5–7, 7–5, [10–8]

Events
Singles	Doubles
← 2015 ·	Innisbrook Open	· 2022 →

Paula Cristina Gonçalves and Petra Krejsová were the defending champions, having won the previous edition in 2015, but chose not to participate.

Quinn Gleason and Ingrid Neel won the title, defeating Akgul Amanmuradova and Lizette Cabrera in the final, 5–7, 7–5, [10–8].

== Seeds ==
1. (Kazakhstan) Anna Danilina / (Australia) Ellen Perez (semifinals)
2. (Montenegro) Danka Kovinić / (Brazil) Laura Pigossi (semifinals)
3. (United States) Sophie Chang / (United States) Alexandra Mueller (first round)
4. (United States) Quinn Gleason / (United States) Ingrid Neel (champions)

== Draw ==
=== Key ===
- Q = Qualifier
- WC = Wild card
- LL = Lucky loser
- Alt = Alternate
- SE = Special exempt
- PR = Protected ranking
- ITF = ITF entry
- JE = Junior exempt
- w/o = Walkover
- r = Retired
- d = Defaulted
- SR = Special ranking

=== Draw ===
First round
1	(Kazakhstan) A Danilina (Australia) E Perez	6	6
(United States) UM Arconada (United States) S Marand	2	2
(United States) A Nefedova (United States) A Riley	0	0^{r}
(United States) R McAdoo (Moldova) A Perper	6	0
3	(United States) S Chang (United States) A Mueller	4	6^{7}
(Japan) H Arakawa (United States) C Harrison	6	7^{9}
(Uzbekistan) A Amanmuradova (Australia) L Cabrera	6	6
(United States) R Newborn (Czech Republic) L Pulchartová	3	4
(Indonesia) B Gumulya (Venezuela) A Uzcátegui	6	6
(United States) J Leslie (United States) A Parks	3	2
(Slovakia) M Hončová (Hungary) P Udvardy	2	3
4	(United States) Q Gleason (United States) I Neel	6	6
(United States) P Montez (United States) C Van Nguyen	5	6	[10]
(Czech Republic) M Kilnarová (United States) W Osuigwe	7	3	[8]
(United States) AA Blakely (United States) J Kissell	2	1
2	(Montenegro) D Kovinić (Brazil) L Pigossi	6	6

Quarterfinals
1	(Kazakhstan) A Danilina (Australia) E Perez	6	6
(United States) R McAdoo (Moldova) A Perper	2	3
(Japan) H Arakawa (United States) C Harrison	6	3	[12]
(Uzbekistan) A Amanmuradova (Australia) L Cabrera	4	6	[14]
(Indonesia) B Gumulya (Venezuela) A Uzcátegui	6^{4}	3
4	(United States) Q Gleason (United States) I Neel	7^{7}	6
(United States) P Montez (United States) C Van Nguyen	1	4
2	(Montenegro) D Kovinić (Brazil) L Pigossi	6	6

Semifinals
1	(Kazakhstan) A Danilina (Australia) E Perez	1	5
(Uzbekistan) A Amanmuradova (Australia) L Cabrera	6	7
4	(United States) Q Gleason (United States) I Neel	6	6
2	(Montenegro) D Kovinić (Brazil) L Pigossi	2	4

Final
(Uzbekistan) A Amanmuradova (Australia) L Cabrera	7	5	[8]
4	(United States) Q Gleason (United States) I Neel	5	7	[10]
