= 2022 U.S. Pro Women's Clay Court Championships – Doubles =

Doubles
- 2022 U.S. Pro Women's Clay Court Championships

Final
- Champions: (United States) Sophie Chang (United States) Angela Kulikov
- Runners-up: (Romania) Irina Bara (Italy) Lucrezia Stefanini
- Score: 6–4, 3–6, [10–8]

Events
Singles	Doubles
← 2019 ·	U.S. Pro Women's Clay Court Championships	· 2023 →

Quinn Gleason and Ingrid Neel were the defending champions but Gleason chose not to participate. Neel partnered alongside Alycia Parks but lost in the first round to Irina Bara and Lucrezia Stefanini.

Sophie Chang and Angela Kulikov won the title, defeating Bara and Stefanini in the final, 6–4, 3–6, [10–8].

== Seeds ==
1. (Germany) Julia Lohoff / (United Kingdom) Samantha Murray Sharan (semifinals)
2. (United States) Emina Bektas / (United Kingdom) Tara Moore (first round, retired)
3. (United States) Ingrid Neel / (United States) Alycia Parks (first round)
4. (United States) Hailey Baptiste / (United States) Whitney Osuigwe (quarterfinals)

== Draw ==
=== Key ===
- Q = Qualifier
- WC = Wild card
- LL = Lucky loser
- Alt = Alternate
- SE = Special exempt
- PR = Protected ranking
- ITF = ITF entry
- JE = Junior exempt
- w/o = Walkover
- r = Retired
- d = Defaulted
- SR = Special ranking

=== Draw ===
First round
1	(Germany) J Lohoff (United Kingdom) S Murray Sharan	6	6
A Gasanova (Greece) V Grammatikopoulou	2	3
WC	(United States) A Guichard (United States) V Ray	3	1
WC	(United States) H Chang (United States) E Mandlik	6	6
4	(United States) H Baptiste (United States) W Osuigwe	7^{7}	2	[10]
(Romania) A Cadanțu-Ignatik (Romania) G Lee	6^{3}	6	[4]
(United States) S Chang (United States) A Kulikov	2	7^{7}	[10]
(United States) F Di Lorenzo (United States) R McAdoo	6	6^{4}	[8]
(United States) R Anderson (United States) T Townsend	6	7^{7}
(United States) C Harrison (United States) M Manasse	3	6^{4}
(Romania) I Bara (Italy) L Stefanini	7^{7}	6
3	(United States) I Neel (United States) A Parks	6^{5}	1
(United States) L Chirico (United States) G Min	6	6
(Japan) N Hibino (Georgia (country)) S Shapatava	3	3
WC	(United States) K Day (United States) E Douglas	7	1
2	(United States) E Bektas (United Kingdom) T Moore	5	0^{r}

Quarterfinals
1	(Germany) J Lohoff (United Kingdom) S Murray Sharan	6	7^{7}
WC	(United States) H Chang (United States) E Mandlik	1	6^{4}
4	(United States) H Baptiste (United States) W Osuigwe	7	3	[7]
(United States) S Chang (United States) A Kulikov	5	6	[10]
(United States) R Anderson (United States) T Townsend	6^{6}	2
(Romania) I Bara (Italy) L Stefanini	7^{8}	6
(United States) L Chirico (United States) G Min	4	6^{3}
WC	(United States) K Day (United States) E Douglas	6	7^{7}

Semifinals
1	(Germany) J Lohoff (United Kingdom) S Murray Sharan	3	4
(United States) S Chang (United States) A Kulikov	6	6
(Romania) I Bara (Italy) L Stefanini	6	6
WC	(United States) K Day (United States) E Douglas	3	1

Final
(United States) S Chang (United States) A Kulikov	6	3	[10]
(Romania) I Bara (Italy) L Stefanini	4	6	[8]
