= 2019 Innisbrook Open – Singles =

Singles
- 2019 Innisbrook Open

Final
- Champion: (Czech Republic) Barbora Krejčíková
- Runner-up: (United States) Nicole Gibbs
- Score: 6–0, 6–1

Events
Singles	Doubles
← 2015 ·	Innisbrook Open	· 2022 →

Katerina Stewart was the defending champion, having won the previous edition 2015, but chose not to participate.

Barbora Krejčíková won the title, defeating Nicole Gibbs in the final, 6–0, 6–1.

== Seeds ==
1. (United States) Nicole Gibbs (final)
2. (Japan) Kurumi Nara (quarterfinals)
3. (Montenegro) Danka Kovinić (semifinals)
4. (United States) Whitney Osuigwe (quarterfinals)
5. (Czech Republic) Barbora Krejčíková (champion)
6. (Australia) Ellen Perez (quarterfinals)
7. (Italy) Jasmine Paolini (first round)
8. (Bulgaria) Elitsa Kostova (quarterfinals)

== Draw ==
=== Key ===
- Q = Qualifier
- WC = Wild card
- LL = Lucky loser
- Alt = Alternate
- SE = Special exempt
- PR = Protected ranking
- ITF = ITF entry
- JE = Junior exempt
- w/o = Walkover
- r = Retired
- d = Defaulted
- SR = Special ranking

=== Finals ===
Semifinals
1	(United States) Nicole Gibbs	6	4	6
3	(Montenegro) Danka Kovinić	1	6	2
5	(Czech Republic) Barbora Krejčíková	7	6
(Hungary) Panna Udvardy	5	2

Final
1	(United States) Nicole Gibbs	0	1
5	(Czech Republic) Barbora Krejčíková	6	6

=== Top half ===
First round
1	(United States) N Gibbs	6	7^{7}
(Australia) A Myers	2	6^{5}
(United States) Q Gleason	6	2	3
(Canada) G Dabrowski	4	6	6
(Australia) I Wallace	0^{r}
Q	(Brazil) L Pigossi	3
Q	(Uzbekistan) A Amanmuradova	0	2
6	(Australia) E Perez	6	6
3	(Montenegro) D Kovinić	6^{5}	7	6
(United States) S Chang	7^{7}	5	2
WC	(United States) P Montez	7^{7}	4	7
(Australia) L Cabrera	6^{5}	6	5
Q	(New Zealand) E Fanning	2	4
(Slovakia) M Hončová	6	6
Q	(United States) S Carrington	0	3
8	(Bulgaria) E Kostova	6	6

Second round
1	(United States) N Gibbs	6	3	7
(Canada) G Dabrowski	4	6	5
Q	(Brazil) L Pigossi	4	4
6	(Australia) E Perez	6	6
3	(Montenegro) D Kovinić	6	6
WC	(United States) P Montez	3	1
(Slovakia) M Hončová	2	5
8	(Bulgaria) E Kostova	6	7

Quarterfinals
1	(United States) N Gibbs	6	6
6	(Australia) E Perez	1	3
3	(Montenegro) D Kovinić	7^{7}	3	6
8	(Bulgaria) E Kostova	6^{4}	6	2

Semifinals
1	(United States) N Gibbs	6	4	6
3	(Montenegro) D Kovinić	1	6	2

=== Bottom half ===
First round
5	(Czech Republic) B Krejčíková	5	6	6
Q	(United States) I Neel	7	2	0
(United States) S Marand	6	7
(Kazakhstan) A Danilina	1	5
WC	(United States) A Parks	4	7^{7}	3
(Czech Republic) M Kilnarová	6	6^{3}	6
LL	(Japan) H Arakawa	2	4
4	(United States) W Osuigwe	6	6
7	(Italy) J Paolini	6^{2}	3
(France) C Paquet	7^{7}	6
(Hungary) P Udvardy	6	6
Q	(United States) A Nefedova	3	4
(Japan) M Osaka	6	7^{8}
(Poland) U Radwańska	1	6^{6}
(United States) UM Arconada	4	6	2
2	(Japan) K Nara	6	4	6

Second round
5	(Czech Republic) B Krejčíková	6	6
(United States) S Marand	2	2
(Czech Republic) M Kilnarová	0	3
4	(United States) W Osuigwe	6	6
(France) C Paquet	1	4
(Hungary) P Udvardy	6	6
(Japan) M Osaka	6^{5}	4
2	(Japan) K Nara	7^{7}	6

Quarterfinals
5	(Czech Republic) B Krejčíková	6	6
4	(United States) W Osuigwe	2	4
(Hungary) P Udvardy	6	6
2	(Japan) K Nara	2	3

Semifinals
5	(Czech Republic) B Krejčíková	7	6
(Hungary) P Udvardy	5	2
