= 2022 U.S. Pro Women's Clay Court Championships =

Tennis tournament

- Date: 11–17 April 2022
- Edition: 7th
- Category: ITF Women's World Tennis Tour
- Prize money: $100,000
- Surface: Clay / Outdoor
- Location: Palm Harbor, Florida, United States

Champions

Singles
- (United States) Katie Volynets

Doubles
- (United States) Sophie Chang / (United States) Angela Kulikov
← 2019 ·	U.S. Pro Women's Clay Court Championships	· 2023 →

The 2022 U.S. Pro Women's Clay Court Championships was a professional tennis tournament played on outdoor clay courts. It was the seventh edition of the tournament which was part of the 2022 ITF Women's World Tennis Tour. It took place in Palm Harbor, Florida, United States between 11 and 17 April 2022.

== Singles main draw entrants ==
=== Seeds ===
Country	Player	Rank^{1}	Seed
CHN	Wang Xinyu	88	1
~~AUS~~	~~Astra Sharma~~	~~92~~	~~2~~
ROU	Irina Bara	118	3
USA	Hailey Baptiste	124	4
CHN	Wang Xiyu	149	5
USA	Alycia Parks	150	6
	Anastasia Gasanova	153	7
USA	Katie Volynets	154	8

- ^{1} Rankings are as of 4 April 2022.

=== Other entrants ===
The following players received wildcards into the singles main draw:

- (United States) Hailey Baptiste
- (United States) Sophie Chang
- (United States) Peyton Stearns
- (United States) Taylor Townsend

The following players received entry from the qualifying draw:

- (United States) Hanna Chang
- (France) Salma Djoubri
- (United States) Elvina Kalieva
- (Romania) Gabriela Lee
- (United States) Maegan Manasse
- (Australia) Seone Mendez
- (United States) Whitney Osuigwe
- (Mexico) María José Portillo Ramírez

The following player received entry as a lucky loser:

- (United States) Catherine Harrison

== Champions ==
=== Singles ===
- (United States) Katie Volynets def. (China) Wang Xiyu 6–4, 6–3

=== Doubles ===
- (United States) Sophie Chang / (United States) Angela Kulikov def. (Romania) Irina Bara / (Italy) Lucrezia Stefanini 6–4, 3–6, [10–8]
