= 2016 Aegon Surbiton Trophy – Women's doubles =

Women's doubles
- 2016 Aegon Surbiton Trophy

Final
- Champions: (United States) Sanaz Marand (United States) Melanie Oudin
- Runners-up: (United States) Robin Anderson (Australia) Alison Bai
- Score: 6–4, 7–5

Events
Singles	men	women
Doubles	men	women
← 2015 ·	Aegon Surbiton Trophy	· 2017 →

Lyudmyla Kichenok and Xenia Knoll were the defending champions, but chose not to participate.

Sanaz Marand and Melanie Oudin won the title, defeating Robin Anderson and Alison Bai in the final, 6–4, 7–5.

== Seeds ==
1. (Belgium) An-Sophie Mestach / (United States) Maria Sanchez (semifinals)
2. (Bulgaria) Elitsa Kostova / (Mexico) Renata Zarazúa (first round, withdrew)
3. (Argentina) Catalina Pella / (France) Shérazad Reix (quarterfinals, withdrew)
4. (United States) Robin Anderson / (Australia) Alison Bai (final)

== Draw ==
=== Key ===
- Q = Qualifier
- WC = Wild card
- LL = Lucky loser
- Alt = Alternate
- SE = Special exempt
- PR = Protected ranking
- ITF = ITF entry
- JE = Junior exempt
- w/o = Walkover
- r = Retired
- d = Defaulted
- SR = Special ranking

First round
(United Kingdom) N Hepburn (United Kingdom) L Phillips	6	0	[10]
(United Kingdom) L Ghodrati (United Kingdom) L Harrington	1	6	[6]
4	(United States) R Anderson (Australia) A Bai	7^{7}	6
(Japan) Y Miyazaki (United Kingdom) K Weymouth	6^{2}	4
(United Kingdom) S Murray (United Kingdom) G Taylor
(Italy) M Caregaro (Croatia) T Mrdeža	w/o
(Finland) M Eklund (United States) A Stevenson	3	4
(United States) S Marand (United States) M Oudin	6	6
(United Kingdom) A Pitak (United Kingdom) K Pitak	1	2
3	(Argentina) C Pella (France) S Reix	6	6
(United Kingdom) SB Grey (Bulgaria) J Terziyska	1	6^{3}
(United Kingdom) H Dart (United Kingdom) K Dunne	6	7^{7}
(United Kingdom) E Appleton (United Kingdom) E Arbuthnott	w/o
2	(Bulgaria) E Kostova (Mexico) R Zarazúa

Quarterfinals
1	(Belgium) A-S Mestach (United States) M Sanchez	6	6
(United Kingdom) N Hepburn (United Kingdom) L Phillips	0	2
4	(United States) R Anderson (Australia) A Bai	6	6
(Italy) M Caregaro (Croatia) T Mrdeža	3	3
(United States) S Marand (United States) M Oudin	w/o
3	(Argentina) C Pella (France) S Reix
(United Kingdom) H Dart (United Kingdom) K Dunne	4	6^{6}
(United Kingdom) E Appleton (United Kingdom) E Arbuthnott	6	7^{8}

Semifinals
1	(Belgium) A-S Mestach (United States) M Sanchez	5	6	[8]
4	(United States) R Anderson (Australia) A Bai	7	2	[10]
(United States) S Marand (United States) M Oudin	6	6^{2}	[10]
(United Kingdom) E Appleton (United Kingdom) E Arbuthnott	2	7^{7}	[7]

Final
4	(United States) R Anderson (Australia) A Bai	4	5
(United States) S Marand (United States) M Oudin	6	7
