= 2022 U.S. Pro Women's Clay Court Championships – Singles =

Singles
- 2022 U.S. Pro Women's Clay Court Championships

Final
- Champion: (United States) Katie Volynets
- Runner-up: (China) Wang Xiyu
- Score: 6–4, 6–3

Events
Singles	Doubles
← 2019 ·	U.S. Pro Women's Clay Court Championships	· 2023 →

Barbora Krejčíková was the defending champion but chose not to participate.

Katie Volynets won the title, defeating Wang Xiyu in the final, 6–4, 6–3.

== Seeds ==
1. (China) Wang Xinyu (first round)
2. (Australia) Astra Sharma (withdrew)
3. (Romania) Irina Bara (semifinals)
4. (United States) Hailey Baptiste (first round)
5. (China) Wang Xiyu (final)
6. (United States) Alycia Parks (second round)
7. Anastasia Gasanova (first round)
8. (United States) Katie Volynets (champion)

== Draw ==
=== Key ===
- Q = Qualifier
- WC = Wild card
- LL = Lucky loser
- Alt = Alternate
- SE = Special exempt
- PR = Protected ranking
- ITF = ITF entry
- JE = Junior exempt
- w/o = Walkover
- r = Retired
- d = Defaulted
- SR = Special ranking

=== Finals ===
Semifinals
5	(China) Wang Xiyu	6	6
LL	(United States) Louisa Chirico	3	2
3	(Romania) Irina Bara	3	2
8	(United States) Katie Volynets	6	6

Final
5	(China) Wang Xiyu	4	3
8	(United States) Katie Volynets	6	6

=== Top half ===
First round
1	(China) Xin Wang	6^{3}	6	3
WC	(United States) S Chang	7^{7}	3	6
(United States) R Anderson	4	4
Q	(Australia) S Mendez	6	6
(Japan) N Hibino	4	2
(Romania) A Cadanțu-Ignatik	6	6
(Italy) L Stefanini	5	0
5	(China) Xiy Wang	7	6
4/WC	(United States) H Baptiste	3	3
LL	(United States) L Chirico	6	6
WC	(United States) P Stearns	6	6^{2}	7
Q	(Mexico) MJ Portillo Ramírez	3	7^{7}	5
Q	(Romania) G Lee	7	0
(United States) C Vandeweghe	5	0^{r}
(United States) C Dolehide	4	1
6	(United States) A Parks	6	6

Second round
WC	(United States) S Chang	6	6
Q	(Australia) S Mendez	0	4
(Romania) A Cadanțu-Ignatik	5	1
5	(China) Xiy Wang	7	6
LL	(United States) L Chirico	4	6	6
WC	(United States) P Stearns	6	4	4
Q	(Romania) G Lee	7^{7}	6
6	(United States) A Parks	6^{4}	3

Quarterfinals
WC	(United States) S Chang	7	4	4
5	(China) Xiy Wang	5	6	6
LL	(United States) L Chirico	5	6	6
Q	(Romania) G Lee	7	4	2

Semifinals
5	(China) Xiy Wang	6	6
LL	(United States) L Chirico	3	2

=== Bottom half ===
First round
7	A Gasanova	2	7	4
(United States) G Min	6	5	6
(Greece) V Grammatikopoulou	4	6	6
Q	(United States) W Osuigwe	6	2	4
Q	(United States) E Kalieva	0	6	6
O Govortsova	6	3	4
(United States) F Di Lorenzo	3	3
3	(Romania) I Bara	6	6
8	(United States) K Volynets	6	6
Q	(France) S Djoubri	1	2
(Japan) K Nara	7^{7}	1	6
LL	(United States) C Harrison	6^{2}	6	4
WC	(United States) T Townsend	6	6
Q	(United States) H Chang	2	2
(Sweden) M Björklund	6	6
Q	(United States) M Manasse	1	2

Second round
(United States) G Min	7	6
(Greece) V Grammatikopoulou	5	2
Q	(United States) E Kalieva	3	2
3	(Romania) I Bara	6	6
8	(United States) K Volynets	6	6
(Japan) K Nara	4	4
WC	(United States) T Townsend	7^{7}	6
(Sweden) M Björklund	6^{5}	4

Quarterfinals
(United States) G Min	3	4
3	(Romania) I Bara	6	6
8	(United States) K Volynets	7	4	6
WC	(United States) T Townsend	5	6	0

Semifinals
3	(Romania) I Bara	3	2
8	(United States) K Volynets	6	6
