= 2019 Innisbrook Open =

- Date: 1–7 April 2019
- Edition: 6th
- Category: ITF Women's World Tennis Tour
- Prize money: $80,000
- Surface: Clay
- Location: Palm Harbor, Florida, United States

Champions

Singles
- (Czech Republic) Barbora Krejčíková

Doubles
- (United States) Quinn Gleason / (United States) Ingrid Neel
← 2015 ·	Innisbrook Open	· 2022 →

The 2019 Innisbrook Open was a professional tennis tournament played on outdoor clay courts. It was the sixth edition of the tournament which was part of the 2019 ITF Women's World Tennis Tour. It took place in Palm Harbor, Florida, United States between 1 and 7 April 2019.

== Singles main-draw entrants ==
=== Seeds ===
Country	Player	Rank^{1}	Seed
USA	Nicole Gibbs	125	1
JPN	Kurumi Nara	178	2
MNE	Danka Kovinić	192	3
USA	Whitney Osuigwe	205	4
CZE	Barbora Krejčíková	209	5
AUS	Ellen Perez	210	6
ITA	Jasmine Paolini	215	7
BUL	Elitsa Kostova	217	8

- ^{1} Rankings are as of 18 March 2019.

=== Other entrants ===
The following players received wildcards into the singles main draw:

- (United States) Pamela Montez
- (United States) Alycia Parks

The following players received entry from the qualifying draw:

- (Uzbekistan) Akgul Amanmuradova
- (United States) Safiya Carrington
- (New Zealand) Emily Fanning
- (United States) Ingrid Neel
- (United States) Anastasia Nefedova
- (Brazil) Laura Pigossi

The following player received entry as a lucky loser:

- (Japan) Haruna Arakawa

== Champions ==
=== Singles ===
- (Czech Republic) Barbora Krejčíková def. (United States) Nicole Gibbs, 6–0, 6–1

=== Doubles ===
- (United States) Quinn Gleason / (United States) Ingrid Neel def. (Uzbekistan) Akgul Amanmuradova / (Australia) Lizette Cabrera, 5–7, 7–5, [10–8]
