= 2019 Braidy Industries Women's Tennis Classic =

- Date: 22–28 July 2019
- Edition: 7th
- Category: ITF Women's World Tennis Tour
- Prize money: $60,000
- Surface: Hard
- Location: Ashland, United States

Champions

Singles
- (Australia) Ellen Perez

Doubles
- (United States) Sanaz Marand / (United States) Caitlin Whoriskey
← 2018 ·	Braidy Industries Women's Tennis Classic	· 2020 →

The 2019 Braidy Industries Women's Tennis Classic was a professional tennis tournament played on outdoor hard courts. It was the seventh edition of the tournament, which was part of the 2019 ITF Women's World Tennis Tour. It took place in Ashland, United States between 22 and 28 July 2019.

== Singles main-draw entrants ==
=== Seeds ===
Country	Player	Rank^{1}	Seed
USA	Madison Brengle	83	1
RUS	Anna Kalinskaya	159	2
USA	Ann Li	173	3
KOR	Han Na-lae	174	4
USA	Robin Anderson	176	5
TPE	Liang En-shuo	177	6
AUS	Ellen Perez	197	7
AUS	Zoe Hives	201	8

- ^{1} Rankings are as of 15 July 2019.

=== Other entrants ===
The following players received wildcards into the singles main draw:

- (United States) Hayley Carter
- (United States) Victoria Duval
- (United States) Jennifer Elie
- (United States) Peyton Stearns

The following players received entry from the qualifying draw:

- (Oman) Fatma Al-Nabhani
- (Montenegro) Vladica Babić
- (United States) Hanna Chang
- (United States) Alexa Glatch
- (United States) Lorraine Guillermo
- (Australia) Abbie Myers
- (United States) Anastasia Nefedova
- (Japan) Ayaka Okuno

The following player received entry as a Lucky Loser:

- (Russia) Angelina Gabueva

== Champions ==
=== Singles ===
- (Australia) Ellen Perez def. (Australia) Zoe Hives, 6–2, 3–2, ret.

=== Doubles ===
- (United States) Sanaz Marand / (United States) Caitlin Whoriskey def. (Montenegro) Vladica Babić / (Sweden) Julia Rosenqvist, 7–6^{(7–4)}, 6–4
