= 2016 Aegon Surbiton Trophy – Women's singles =

Women's singles
- 2016 Aegon Surbiton Trophy

Final
- Champion: (Russia) Marina Melnikova
- Runner-up: (France) Stéphanie Foretz
- Score: 6–3, 7–6^{(8–6)}

Events
Singles	men	women
Doubles	men	women
- Aegon Surbiton Trophy

Vitalia Diatchenko was the defending champion, but chose not to participate.

Marina Melnikova won the title, defeating Stéphanie Foretz in the final, 6–3, 7–6^{(8–6)}.

== Seeds ==
1. (China) Duan Yingying (second round)
2. (Chinese Taipei) Chang Kai-chen (first round)
3. (Netherlands) Lesley Kerkhove (second round)
4. (Belgium) An-Sophie Mestach (first round)
5. (Japan) Mayo Hibi (second round)
6. (Tunisia) Ons Jabeur (first round)
7. (United States) Robin Anderson (quarterfinals)
8. (Bulgaria) Elitsa Kostova (quarterfinals)

== Main draw ==
Key

- Q = Qualifier
- WC = Wild card
- LL = Lucky loser
- Alt = Alternate
- ITF = ITF entry
- PR = Protected ranking
- SR = Special ranking
- SE = Special exempt
- JE = Junior exempt
- JR = Junior Accelerator Programme entrant
- CO = College Accelerator Programme entrant
- NG = Next Gen Accelerator Program entrant
- w/o = Walkover
- r = Retired
- d = Defaulted

=== Finals ===
Semifinals
(Russia) Marina Melnikova	3	6	7^{7}
(Argentina) Catalina Pella	6	3	6^{2}
(France) Stéphanie Foretz	4	6	6
PR	(United States) Melanie Oudin	6	3	2

Final
(Russia) Marina Melnikova	6	7^{8}
(France) Stéphanie Foretz	3	6^{6}

=== Top half ===
First round
1	(China) Y Duan	6	7^{7}
(United States) S Marand	4	6^{1}
(Australia) J Fourlis	4	3
(Russia) M Melnikova	6	6
(Italy) M Caregaro	4	6	6
(France) S Reix	6	4	3
WC	(United Kingdom) H Dart	7^{7}	1	2
7	(United States) R Anderson	6^{3}	6	6
3	(Netherlands) L Kerkhove	7^{7}	6
(United States) M Sanchez	6^{2}	4
(Argentina) C Pella	7	5	6
(Croatia) T Mrdeža	5	7	2
(Australia) S Sanders	6	6
(Bulgaria) J Terziyska	3	3
Q	(United Kingdom) E Arbuthnott	4	1
8	(Bulgaria) E Kostova	6	6

Second round
1	(China) Y Duan	6^{7}	6^{5}
(Russia) M Melnikova	7^{9}	7^{7}
(Italy) M Caregaro	3	4
7	(United States) R Anderson	6	6
3	(Netherlands) L Kerkhove	6	2	0
(Argentina) C Pella	4	6	6
(Australia) S Sanders	7	4	6^{2}
8	(Bulgaria) E Kostova	5	6	7^{7}

Quarterfinals
(Russia) M Melnikova	6	6^{5}	6
7	(United States) R Anderson	4	7^{7}	1
(Argentina) C Pella	6	7
8	(Bulgaria) E Kostova	4	5

Semifinals
(Russia) M Melnikova	3	6	7^{7}
(Argentina) C Pella	6	3	6^{2}

=== Bottom half ===
First round
5	(Japan) M Hibi	6	6
Q	(United Kingdom) G Axon	1	3
(United Kingdom) K Dunne	5	1
(France) S Foretz	7	6
LL	(United Kingdom) E Hurst	0	2
(Australia) A Bai	6	6
Q	(Poland) M Fręch	1	6	7
4	(Belgium) A-S Mestach	6	4	5
6	(Tunisia) O Jabeur	6	0	3
PR	(United States) M Oudin	4	6	6
Q	(United States) A Stevenson	4	5
WC	(United Kingdom) E Appleton	6	7
WC	(United Kingdom) G Taylor	6	6
(Mexico) R Zarazúa	1	0
WC	(United Kingdom) S Murray	6^{3}	7	6
2	(Chinese Taipei) K-c Chang	7^{7}	5	4

Second round
5	(Japan) M Hibi	7^{7}	5	2
(France) S Foretz	6^{5}	7	6
(Australia) A Bai	3	2
Q	(Poland) M Fręch	6	6
PR	(United States) M Oudin	6	6
WC	(United Kingdom) E Appleton	0	2
WC	(United Kingdom) G Taylor	3	0
WC	(United Kingdom) S Murray	6	6

Quarterfinals
(France) S Foretz	3	6	7
Q	(Poland) M Fręch	6	3	5
PR	(United States) M Oudin	7	6
WC	(United Kingdom) S Murray	5	2

Semifinals
(France) S Foretz	4	6	6
PR	(United States) M Oudin	6	3	2
