= 2015 Aegon Surbiton Trophy =

Tennis tournament in England

- Date: 8–14 June
- Edition: 12th (ATP); 13th (ITF)
- Category: ATP Challenger Tour; ITF Women's Circuit
- Prize money: €42,500 (ATP) $50,000 (ITF)
- Surface: Grass
- Location: Surbiton, United Kingdom

Champions

Men's singles
- (Australia) Matthew Ebden

Women's singles
- (Russia) Vitalia Diatchenko

Men's doubles
- (United Kingdom) Ken Skupski / (United Kingdom) Neal Skupski

Women's doubles
- (Ukraine) Lyudmyla Kichenok / (Switzerland) Xenia Knoll
← 2008 ·	Aegon Surbiton Trophy	· 2016 →

The 2015 Aegon Surbiton Trophy was a professional tennis tournament played on outdoor grass courts. It was the twelfth edition for the men and thirteenth edition for the women of the tournament and part of the 2015 ATP Challenger Tour and 2015 ITF Women's Circuit, offering a total of €42,500 (ATP) and $50,000 (ITF) in prize money. It took place in Surbiton, United Kingdom, on 8–14 June 2015.

== Men's singles main draw entrants ==
=== Seeds ===
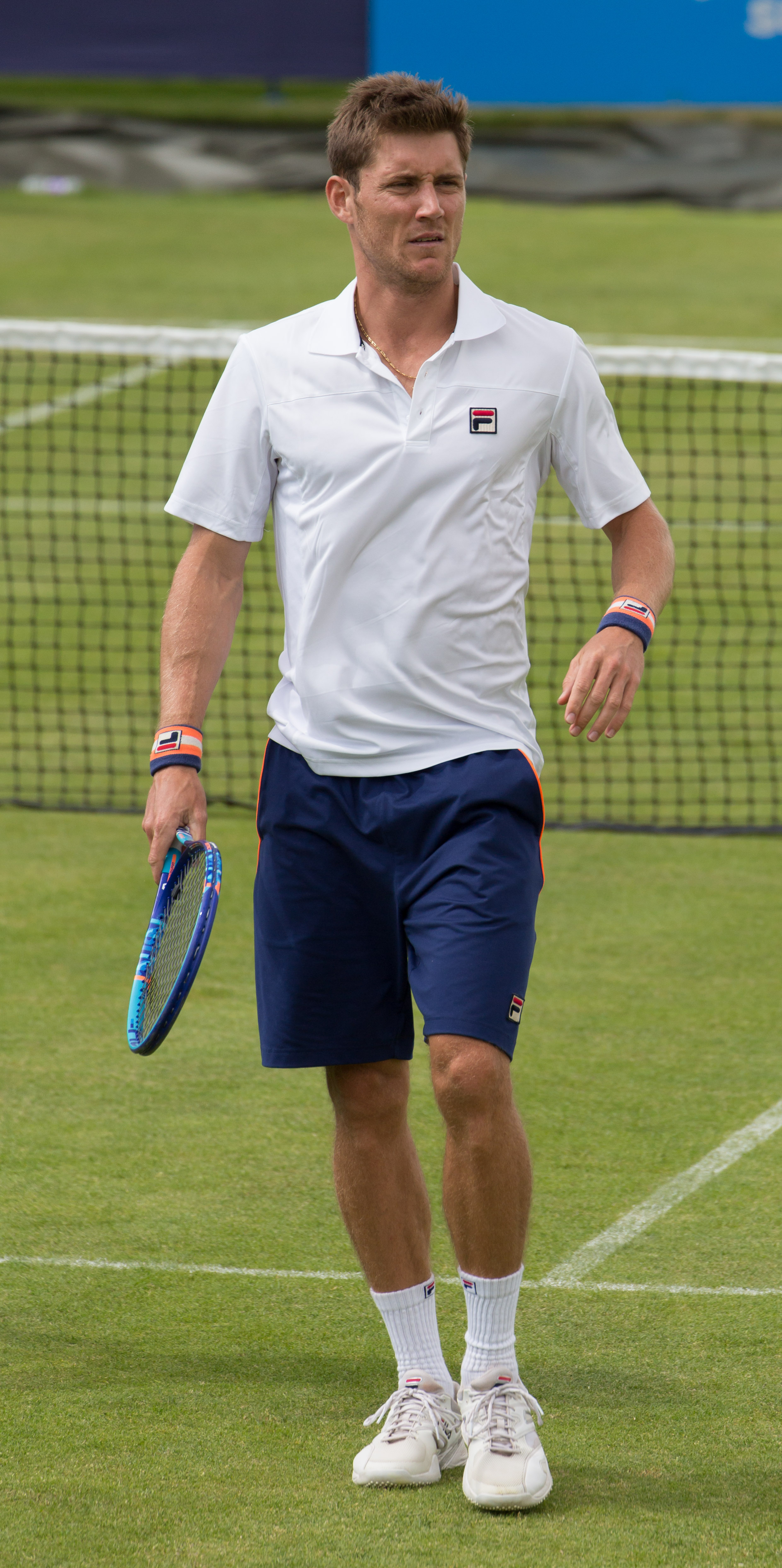
Matthew Ebden, Men's singles champion for 2015

Country	Player	Rank^{1}	Seed
ITA	Luca Vanni	102	1
GBR	James Ward	104	2
USA	Ryan Harrison	126	3
USA	Denis Kudla	136	4
JPN	Yoshihito Nishioka	146	5
USA	Jared Donaldson	153	6
IND	Yuki Bhambri	156	7
IRL	James McGee	159	8

- ^{1} Rankings as of 25 May 2015

=== Other entrants ===
The following players received wildcards into the singles main draw:

- (United Kingdom) Edward Corrie
- (United Kingdom) Daniel Cox
- (United Kingdom) Joshua Milton
- (United Kingdom) David Rice

The following player gain entry as special exempt into the singles main draw:

- (Australia) Luke Saville
- (United States) Connor Smith

The following players received entry from the qualifying draw:

- (Australia) Alex Bolt
- (Bulgaria) Dimitar Kutrovsky
- (Denmark) Frederik Nielsen
- (United Kingdom) Daniel Smethurst

== Women's singles main draw entrants ==
=== Seeds ===
Country	Player	Rank^{1}	Seed
RUS	Vitalia Diatchenko	91	1
TPE	Hsieh Su-wei	125	2
CZE	Petra Cetkovská	147	3
LUX	Mandy Minella	170	4
PAR	Verónica Cepede Royg	173	5
EST	Anett Kontaveit	185	6
FRA	Stéphanie Foretz	194	7
JPN	Naomi Osaka	197	8

- ^{1} Rankings as of 25 May 2015

=== Other entrants ===
The following players received wildcards into the singles main draw:

- (United Kingdom) Georgina Axon
- (United Kingdom) Laura Deigman
- (United Kingdom) Francesca Stephenson
- (United Kingdom) Gabriella Taylor

The following players received entry from the qualifying draw:

- (Australia) Naiktha Bains
- (United Kingdom) Jazzamay Drew
- (United Kingdom) Lucy Brown
- (Brazil) Luisa Stefani

The following player received entry by a protected ranking:

- (Romania) Mihaela Buzărnescu

== Men's doubles main draw entrants ==
=== Seeds ===
Country	Player	Country	Player	Rank^{1}	Seed
USA	Eric Butorac	GBR	Colin Fleming	122	1
SWE	Johan Brunström	ISR	Jonathan Erlich	154	2
NZL	Marcus Daniell	BRA	Marcelo Demoliner	175	3
FRA	Fabrice Martin	IND	Purav Raja	218	4

- ^{1} Rankings as of May 25, 2015.

=== Other entrants ===
The following pairs received wildcards into the doubles main draw:

- (United Kingdom) Luke Bambridge / (United Kingdom) Liam Broady
- (United Kingdom) Sean Thornley / (United Kingdom) Darren Walsh

The following pairs gained entry into the doubles main draw as an alternate:

- (Japan) Hiroki Moriya / (China) Zhang Ze

== Champions ==
=== Men's singles ===
- (Australia) Matthew Ebden def. (United States) Denis Kudla 6–7^{(4–7)}, 6–4, 7–6^{(7–5)}

=== Women's singles ===
- (Russia) Vitalia Diatchenko def. (Japan) Naomi Osaka, 7–6^{(7–5)}, 6–0

=== Men's doubles ===
- (United Kingdom) Ken Skupski / (United Kingdom) Neal Skupski def. (New Zealand) Marcus Daniell / (Brazil) Marcelo Demoliner 6–3, 6–4

=== Women's doubles ===
- (Ukraine) Lyudmyla Kichenok / (Switzerland) Xenia Knoll def. (United Kingdom) Tara Moore / (United Kingdom) Nicola Slater, 7–6^{(8–6)}, 6–3
