= 2016 Aegon Surbiton Trophy – Men's singles =

Men's singles
- 2016 Aegon Surbiton Trophy

Final
- Champion: (Chinese Taipei) Lu Yen-hsun
- Runner-up: (Romania) Marius Copil
- Score: 7–5, 7–6^{(13–11)}

Events
Singles	men	women
Doubles	men	women
- Aegon Surbiton Trophy

Matthew Ebden was the defending champion, but chose not to defend his title.

Lu Yen-hsun won the title after defeating Marius Copil 7–5, 7–6^{(13–11)} in the final.

== Seeds ==
1. (United Kingdom) Daniel Evans (second round)
2. (Australia) Jordan Thompson (semifinals)
3. (Chinese Taipei) Lu Yen-hsun (champion)
4. (United States) Bjorn Fratangelo (semifinals)
5. (Germany) Dustin Brown (quarterfinals)
6. (United States) Tim Smyczek (first round)
7. (China) Wu Di (second round)
8. (India) Saketh Myneni (second round)

== Draw ==
Key

- Q = Qualifier
- WC = Wild card
- LL = Lucky loser
- Alt = Alternate
- ITF = ITF entry
- PR = Protected ranking
- SR = Special ranking
- SE = Special exempt
- JE = Junior exempt
- JR = Junior Accelerator Programme entrant
- CO = College Accelerator Programme entrant
- NG = Next Gen Accelerator Program entrant
- w/o = Walkover
- r = Retired
- d = Defaulted

=== Finals ===
Semifinals
Q	(Romania) Marius Copil	6	6
4	(United States) Bjorn Fratangelo	3	4
3	(Chinese Taipei) Lu Yen-hsun	6^{5}	6	7^{7}
2	(Australia) Jordan Thompson	7^{7}	3	6^{4}

Final
Q	(Romania) Marius Copil	5	6^{11}
3	(Chinese Taipei) Lu Yen-hsun	7	7^{13}

=== Top half ===
First round
1	(United Kingdom) D Evans	6	6
(United States) A Sarkissian	2	4
Q	(Romania) M Copil	6	6
LL	(United Kingdom) J Milton	4	2
SE	(Germany) T Kamke	6	6
Q	(Poland) M Przysiężny	3	3
(Australia) J Duckworth	4	6	3
8	(India) S Myneni	6	3	6
4	(United States) B Fratangelo	6	7^{7}
WC	(United Kingdom) L Glasspool	2	6^{4}
(China) Z Li	2	4
Q	(United Kingdom) J O'Mara	6	6
(Slovenia) G Žemlja	4	7^{7}	5
(United States) F Tiafoe	6	6^{4}	7
WC	(United Kingdom) A Ward	1	6^{5}
7	(China) D Wu	6	7^{7}

Second round
1	(United Kingdom) D Evans	4	2
Q	(Romania) M Copil	6	6
SE	(Germany) T Kamke	6	6
8	(India) S Myneni	0	4
4	(United States) B Fratangelo	6	6
Q	(United Kingdom) J O'Mara	3	2
(United States) F Tiafoe	4	7^{7}	6
7	(China) D Wu	6	6^{3}	4

Quarterfinals
Q	(Romania) M Copil	6	2	6
SE	(Germany) T Kamke	4	6	3
4	(United States) B Fratangelo	6	6
(United States) F Tiafoe	3	4

Semifinals
Q	(Romania) M Copil	6	6
4	(United States) B Fratangelo	3	4

=== Bottom half ===
First round
6	(United States) T Smyczek	6	2	6^{2}
WC	(United Kingdom) L Broady	3	6	7^{7}
(Australia) L Saville	6	7^{8}
(Spain) A Menéndez-Maceiras	4	6^{6}
(United States) D Nguyen	7	5	6
Q	(Australia) B Mousley	5	7	1
(Japan) H Moriya	3	4
3	(Chinese Taipei) Y-h Lu	6	6
5	(Germany) D Brown	7^{7}	6
(Colombia) E Struvay	6^{2}	4
(Bosnia and Herzegovina) A Šetkić	3	4
WC	(United Kingdom) E Corrie	6	6
(United Kingdom) B Klein	2	4
(Australia) J-P Smith	6	6
(Germany) P Gojowczyk	2	3
2	(Australia) J Thompson	6	6

Second round
WC	(United Kingdom) L Broady	6	2	6^{5}
(Australia) L Saville	3	6	7^{7}
(United States) D Nguyen	3	4
3	(Chinese Taipei) Y-h Lu	6	6
5	(Germany) D Brown	6	6
WC	(United Kingdom) E Corrie	3	3
(Australia) J-P Smith	6	6^{5}	3
2	(Australia) J Thompson	2	7^{7}	6

Quarterfinals
(Australia) L Saville	4	1
3	(Chinese Taipei) Y-h Lu	6	6
5	(Germany) D Brown	2	2
2	(Australia) J Thompson	6	6

Semifinals
3	(Chinese Taipei) Y-h Lu	6^{5}	6	7^{7}
2	(Australia) J Thompson	7^{7}	3	6^{4}
