= Braidy Industries Women's Tennis Classic =

- 2019 Braidy Industries Women's Tennis Classic

ITF Women's Tour
- Event name: Braidy Industries Women's Tennis Classic (2018–); Our Lady of Bellefonte Hospital Tennis Classic (2004–08)
- Location: Ashland, United States
- Venue: Ashland Tennis Center
- Category: ITF Women's Circuit
- Surface: Hard
- Draw: 32S/32Q/16D
- Prize money: $60,000
- Website: www.ashlandprotennis.com

The Braidy Industries Women's Tennis Classic (formerly known as the Our Lady of Bellefonte Hospital Tennis Classic) is a tournament for professional female tennis players played on outdoor hardcourts. The event is classified as a $60k ITF Women's Circuit tournament and has been held in Ashland, United States, since 2004. The tournament was not held from 2009 to 2017 due to unsuitable courts.

== Past finals ==
=== Singles ===
Year	Champion	Runner-up	Score
2019	(Australia) Ellen Perez	(Australia) Zoe Hives	6–3, 3–2 ret.
2018	(United States) Gail Brodsky	(United States) Maegan Manasse	4–6, 6–1, 6–0
2009–17	not held		
2008	(United States) Varvara Lepchenko	(United States) Carly Gullickson	5–7, 6–0, 6–2
2007	(Hungary) Melinda Czink	(United States) Varvara Lepchenko	6–1, 2–6, 6–4
2006	(Canada) Aleksandra Wozniak	(Hungary) Ágnes Szávay	6–1, 7–6^{(7–2)}
2005	(Thailand) Napaporn Tongsalee	(Puerto Rico) Kristina Brandi	6–4, 2–6, 6–4
2004	(Argentina) María Emilia Salerni	(United States) Kelly McCain	6–4, 6–4

=== Doubles ===
Year	Champions	Runners-up	Score
2019	(United States) Sanaz Marand (United States) Caitlin Whoriskey	(Montenegro) Vladica Babić (Sweden) Julia Rosenqvist	7–6^{(7–4)}, 6–4
2018	(Serbia) Jovana Jakšić (Mexico) Renata Zarazúa	(United States) Sanaz Marand (United States) Whitney Osuigwe	6–3, 5–7, [10–4]
2009–17	not held		
2008	(Latvia) Līga Dekmeijere (Croatia) Jelena Pandžić	(United States) Julie Ditty (United States) Carly Gullickson	6–3, 3–6, [10–8]
2007	(Brazil) Maria Fernanda Alves (Czech Republic) Eva Hrdinová	(Estonia) Maret Ani (Germany) Sandra Klösel	7–6^{(7–5)}, 6–2
2006	(United States) Julie Ditty (Venezuela) Milagros Sequera	(United States) Ashley Harkleroad (Hungary) Ágnes Szávay	6–3, 5–7, 6–2
2005	(United States) Teryn Ashley (United States) Amy Frazier	(Brazil) Maria Fernanda Alves (United States) Ahsha Rolle	6–1, 6–4
2004	(Germany) Sandra Klösel (Argentina) María Emilia Salerni	(United States) Cory Ann Avants (United States) Kristen Schlukebir	6–3, 6–3
