= 2016 Aegon Surbiton Trophy =

- Date: 6–12 June
- Edition: 13th (ATP); 14th (ITF)
- Category: ATP Challenger Tour; ITF Women's Circuit
- Prize money: €42,500 (ATP) $50,000 (ITF)
- Surface: Grass
- Location: Surbiton, United Kingdom

Champions

Men's singles
- (Chinese Taipei) Lu Yen-hsun

Women's singles
- (Russia) Marina Melnikova

Men's doubles
- (India) Purav Raja / (India) Divij Sharan

Women's doubles
- (United States) Sanaz Marand / (United States) Melanie Oudin
← 2015 ·	Aegon Surbiton Trophy	· 2017 →

The 2016 Aegon Surbiton Trophy was a professional tennis tournament played on outdoor grass courts. It was the thirteenth edition of the tournament for the men and the fourteenth edition of the tournament for the women. It was part of the 2016 ATP Challenger Tour and the 2016 ITF Women's Circuit, offering a total prize money of €42,500 for men and $50,000 for women. It took place in Surbiton, United Kingdom, on 6–12 June 2016.

== Men's singles main draw entrants ==
=== Seeds ===
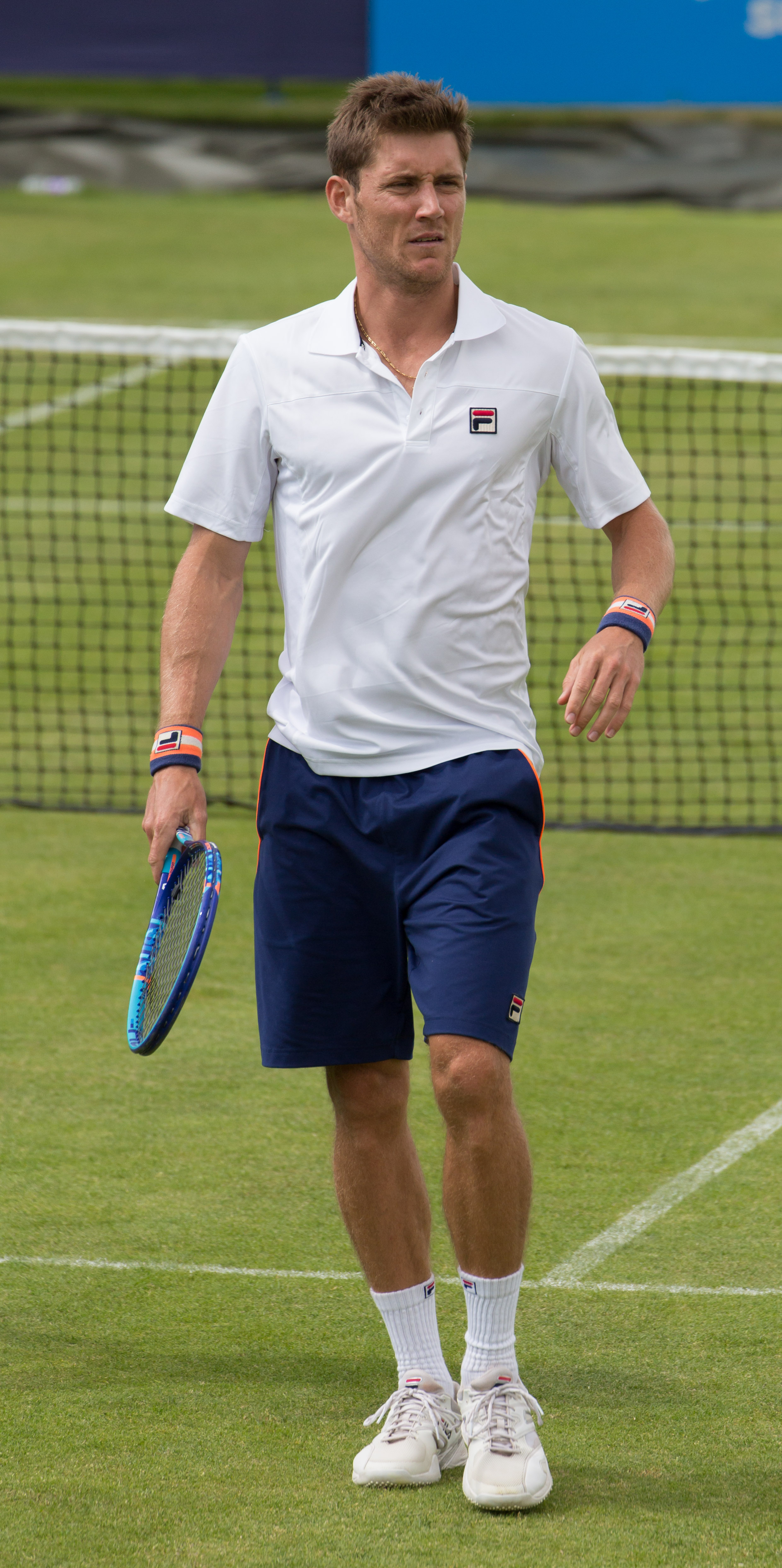
Matthew Ebden, Men's singles champion for 2015

Country	Player	Rank^{1}	Seed
GBR	Daniel Evans	91	1
AUS	Jordan Thompson	94	2
TPE	Lu Yen-hsun	95	3
USA	Bjorn Fratangelo	103	4
GER	Dustin Brown	116	5
USA	Tim Smyczek	121	6
CHN	Wu Di	148	7
IND	Saketh Myneni	149	8

- ^{1} Rankings as of 23 May 2016

=== Other entrants ===
The following players received wildcards into the singles main draw:

- (United Kingdom) Liam Broady
- (United Kingdom) Edward Corrie
- (United Kingdom) Lloyd Glasspool
- (United Kingdom) Alexander Ward

The following players received entry into the singles main draw as a special exempt:

- (Germany) Tobias Kamke

The following players received entry from the qualifying draw:

- (Romania) Marius Copil
- (Australia) Bradley Mousley
- (United Kingdom) Jonny O'Mara
- (Poland) Michał Przysiężny

The following player entered as lucky loser:

- (United Kingdom) Joshua Milton

== Women's singles main draw entrants ==
=== Seeds ===
Country	Player	Rank^{1}	Seed
CHN	Duan Yingying	133	1
TPE	Chang Kai-chen	158	2
NED	Lesley Kerkhove	169	3
BEL	An-Sophie Mestach	174	4
JPN	Mayo Hibi	175	5
TUN	Ons Jabeur	176	6
USA	Robin Anderson	198	7
BUL	Elitsa Kostova	200	8

- ^{1} Rankings as of 23 May 2016.

=== Other entrants ===
The following player received a wildcard into the singles main draw:

- (United Kingdom) Emily Appleton
- (United Kingdom) Harriet Dart
- (United Kingdom) Samantha Murray
- (United Kingdom) Gabriella Taylor

The following players received entry from the qualifying draw:

- (United Kingdom) Emily Arbuthnott
- (United Kingdom) Georgina Axon
- (Poland) Magdalena Fręch
- (United States) Alexandra Stevenson

The following player received entry by a lucky loser spot:

- (United Kingdom) Emma Hurst

The following player received entry by a protected ranking:

- (United States) Melanie Oudin

== Champions ==
=== Men's singles ===
- (Chinese Taipei) Lu Yen-hsun def. (Romania) Marius Copil, 7–5, 7–6^{(13–11)}

=== Women's singles ===
- (Russia) Marina Melnikova def. (France) Stéphanie Foretz, 6–3, 7–6^{(8–6)}

=== Men's doubles ===
- (India) Purav Raja / (India) Divij Sharan def. (United Kingdom) Ken Skupski / (United Kingdom) Neal Skupski, 6–4, 7–6^{(7–3)}

=== Women's doubles ===
- (United States) Sanaz Marand / (United States) Melanie Oudin def. (United States) Robin Anderson / (Australia) Alison Bai, 6–4, 7–5
