= 2016 Aegon Surbiton Trophy – Men's doubles =

Men's doubles
- 2016 Aegon Surbiton Trophy

Final
- Champions: (India) Purav Raja (India) Divij Sharan
- Runners-up: (United Kingdom) Ken Skupski (United Kingdom) Neal Skupski
- Score: 6–4, 7–6^{(7–3)}

Events
Singles	men	women
Doubles	men	women
← 2015 ·	Aegon Surbiton Trophy	· 2017 →

Ken Skupski and Neal Skupski were the defending champions but failed to defend their title, losing in the finals to Purav Raja and Divij Sharan 6–4, 7–6^{(7–3)}.

== Seeds ==
1. (United Kingdom) Ken Skupski / (United Kingdom) Neal Skupski (final)
2. (Thailand) Sanchai Ratiwatana / (Thailand) Sonchat Ratiwatana (first round)
3. (United Kingdom) Jonathan Marray / (Canada) Adil Shamasdin (semifinals)
4. (India) Purav Raja / (India) Divij Sharan (champions)

== Draw ==
=== Key ===
- Q = Qualifier
- WC = Wild card
- LL = Lucky loser
- Alt = Alternate
- SE = Special exempt
- PR = Protected ranking
- ITF = ITF entry
- JE = Junior exempt
- w/o = Walkover
- r = Retired
- d = Defaulted
- SR = Special ranking

First round
1	(United Kingdom) K Skupski (United Kingdom) N Skupski	7^{8}	6
WC	(United Kingdom) J Milton (United Kingdom) D Smethurst	6^{6}	4
(Republic of Ireland) D O'Hare (Australia) J-P Smith	7^{7}	4	[5]
(United Kingdom) L Bambridge (United Kingdom) J Salisbury	6^{4}	6	[10]
3	(United Kingdom) J Marray (Canada) A Shamasdin	w/o
(Australia) M Matosevic (Australia) B Mousley
(United Kingdom) D Evans (United Kingdom) L Glasspool	6	6^{6}	[5]
(Germany) D Brown (Chinese Taipei) Y-h Lu	3	7^{8}	[10]
(United Kingdom) B Klein (United Kingdom) A Ward	2	6	[11]
(United Kingdom) L Broady (United Kingdom) D Walsh	6	1	[9]
(Japan) H Moriya (Bosnia and Herzegovina) A Šetkić	4	4
4	(India) P Raja (India) D Sharan	6	6
(China) Z Li (China) D Wu	2	4
(Australia) L Saville (Australia) J Thompson	6	6
(Spain) A Menéndez-Maceiras (India) J Nedunchezhiyan	6	6
2	(Thailand) Sa Ratiwatana (Thailand) So Ratiwatana	4	4

Quarterfinals
1	(United Kingdom) K Skupski (United Kingdom) N Skupski	6	7^{7}
(United Kingdom) L Bambridge (United Kingdom) J Salisbury	4	6^{5}
3	(United Kingdom) J Marray (Canada) A Shamasdin	7^{7}	7^{7}
(Germany) D Brown (Chinese Taipei) Y-h Lu	6^{4}	6^{0}
(United Kingdom) B Klein (United Kingdom) A Ward	4	2
4	(India) P Raja (India) D Sharan	6	6
(Australia) L Saville (Australia) J Thompson	6	6
(Spain) A Menéndez-Maceiras (India) J Nedunchezhiyan	3	4

Semifinals
1	(United Kingdom) K Skupski (United Kingdom) N Skupski	6	6
3	(United Kingdom) J Marray (Canada) A Shamasdin	4	4
4	(India) P Raja (India) D Sharan	6	6
(Australia) L Saville (Australia) J Thompson	3	3

Final
1	(United Kingdom) K Skupski (United Kingdom) N Skupski	4	6^{3}
4	(India) P Raja (India) D Sharan	6	7^{7}
