= 2015 Aegon Surbiton Trophy – Men's singles =

Men's singles
- 2015 Aegon Surbiton Trophy

Final
- Champion: (Australia) Matthew Ebden
- Runner-up: (United States) Denis Kudla
- Score: 6–7^{(4–7)}, 6–4, 7–6^{(7–5)}

Events
Singles	men	women
Doubles	men	women
- Aegon Surbiton Trophy

This was the first edition of the tournament since 2008.

Matthew Ebden won the tournament defeating Denis Kudla in the final, 6–7^{(4–7)}, 6–4, 7–6^{(7–5)}.

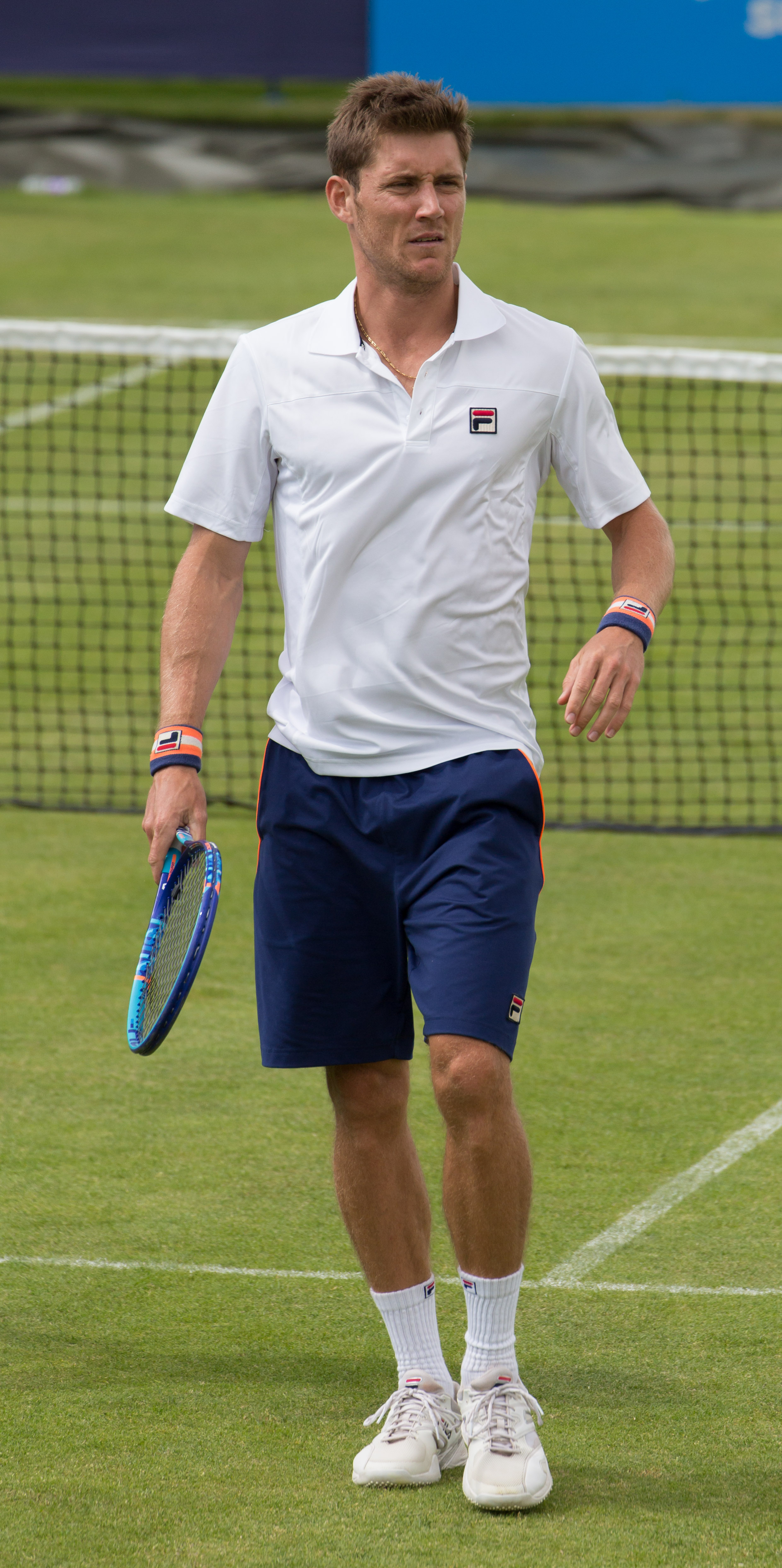
Matthew Ebden, 2015 men's singles champion

== Seeds ==
1. (Italy) Luca Vanni (first round)
2. (United Kingdom) James Ward (first round)
3. (United States) Ryan Harrison (quarterfinals)
4. (United States) Denis Kudla (final)
5. (Japan) Yoshihito Nishioka (quarterfinals)
6. (United States) Jared Donaldson (second round)
7. (India) Yuki Bhambri (first round)
8. (Republic of Ireland) James McGee (semifinals)

== Draw ==
Key

- Q = Qualifier
- WC = Wild card
- LL = Lucky loser
- Alt = Alternate
- ITF = ITF entry
- PR = Protected ranking
- SR = Special ranking
- SE = Special exempt
- JE = Junior exempt
- JR = Junior Accelerator Programme entrant
- CO = College Accelerator Programme entrant
- NG = Next Gen Accelerator Program entrant
- w/o = Walkover
- r = Retired
- d = Defaulted

=== Finals ===
Semifinals
8	(Republic of Ireland) James McGee	2	3
(Australia) Matthew Ebden	6	6
4	(United States) Denis Kudla	6	6
(United Kingdom) Brydan Klein	4	4

Final
(Australia) Matthew Ebden	6^{4}	6	7^{7}
4	(United States) Denis Kudla	7^{7}	4	6^{5}

=== Top half ===
First round
1	(Italy) L Vanni	6^{2}	2
SE	(Australia) L Saville	7^{7}	6
WC	(United Kingdom) E Corrie	7^{7}	0^{r}
WC	(United Kingdom) J Milton	6^{1}	2
WC	(United Kingdom) D Cox	3	6^{8}
(Belgium) M Authom	6	7^{10}
Q	(Australia) A Bolt	6	6^{9}	5
8	(Republic of Ireland) J McGee	4	7^{11}	7
3	(United States) R Harrison	6^{6}	6	6
(United Kingdom) L Broady	7^{8}	3	0
(United States) J Jung	6	6
(China) Z Zhang	3	3
(United States) C Buchanan	3	2
(Australia) M Ebden	6	6
Q	(Bulgaria) D Kutrovsky	2	7^{7}	4
6	(United States) J Donaldson	6	6^{3}	6

Second round
SE	(Australia) L Saville	4	6^{3}
WC	(United Kingdom) J Milton	6	7^{7}
(Belgium) M Authom	3	4
8	(Republic of Ireland) J McGee	6	6
3	(United States) R Harrison	4	6	6
(United States) J Jung	6	4	4
(Australia) M Ebden	6	6
6	(United States) J Donaldson	2	3

Quarterfinals
WC	(United Kingdom) J Milton	2	2
8	(Republic of Ireland) J McGee	6	6
3	(United States) R Harrison	0	2
(Australia) M Ebden	6	6

Semifinals
8	(Republic of Ireland) J McGee	2	3
(Australia) M Ebden	6	6

=== Bottom half ===
First round
5	(Japan) Y Nishioka	4	6	6
(Belgium) N Desein	6	2	3
(Italy) T Fabbiano	6	6
SE	(United States) Connor Smith	1	0
WC	(United Kingdom) D Rice	7	3	6
(India) S Myneni	5	6	3
Q	(United Kingdom) D Smethurst	1	1
4	(United States) D Kudla	6	6
7	(India) Y Bhambri	3	2
(Australia) J-P Smith	6	6
(Netherlands) I Sijsling	6	6
(Japan) H Moriya	4	4
Q	(Denmark) F Nielsen	6	6
(United States) J Jenkins	2	1
(United Kingdom) B Klein	6	6
2	(United Kingdom) J Ward	2	4

Second round
5	(Japan) Y Nishioka	5	6	6
(Italy) T Fabbiano	7	4	4
WC	(United Kingdom) D Rice	2	4
4	(United States) D Kudla	6	6
(Australia) J-P Smith	6	7^{7}
(Netherlands) I Sijsling	1	6^{3}
Q	(Denmark) F Nielsen	6^{5}	6^{3}
(United Kingdom) B Klein	7^{7}	7^{7}

Quarterfinals
5	(Japan) Y Nishioka	2	1
4	(United States) D Kudla	6	6
(Australia) J-P Smith	7^{7}	1	3
(United Kingdom) B Klein	6^{4}	6	6

Semifinals
4	(United States) D Kudla	6	6
(United Kingdom) B Klein	4	4
