= 2015 Aegon Surbiton Trophy – Women's singles =

Women's singles
- 2015 Aegon Surbiton Trophy

Final
- Champion: (Russia) Vitalia Diatchenko
- Runner-up: (Japan) Naomi Osaka
- Score: 7–6^{(7–5)}, 6–0

Events
Singles	men	women
Doubles	men	women
- Aegon Surbiton Trophy

This was the first edition of the tournament since 2008.

Vitalia Diatchenko won the title, defeating Naomi Osaka in the final, 7–6^{(7–5)}, 6–0.

== Seeds ==
1. (Russia) Vitalia Diatchenko (champion)
2. (Chinese Taipei) Hsieh Su-wei (quarterfinals)
3. (Czech Republic) Petra Cetkovská (second round)
4. (Luxembourg) Mandy Minella (first round)
5. (Paraguay) Verónica Cepede Royg (first round)
6. (Estonia) Anett Kontaveit (semifinals)
7. (France) Stéphanie Foretz (second round)
8. (Japan) Naomi Osaka (final)

== Main draw ==
Key

- Q = Qualifier
- WC = Wild card
- LL = Lucky loser
- Alt = Alternate
- ITF = ITF entry
- PR = Protected ranking
- SR = Special ranking
- SE = Special exempt
- JE = Junior exempt
- JR = Junior Accelerator Programme entrant
- CO = College Accelerator Programme entrant
- NG = Next Gen Accelerator Program entrant
- w/o = Walkover
- r = Retired
- d = Defaulted

=== Finals ===
Semifinals
1	(Russia) Vitalia Diatchenko	6	6
(United Kingdom) Naomi Broady	1	3
6	(Estonia) Anett Kontaveit	4	7^{7}	2
8	(Japan) Naomi Osaka	6	6^{5}	6

Final
1	(Russia) Vitalia Diatchenko	7^{7}	6
8	(Japan) Naomi Osaka	6^{5}	0

=== Top half ===
First round
1	(Russia) V Diatchenko	7	1	6
Q	(Australia) N Bains	5	6	1
Q	(United Kingdom) L Brown	5	0^{r}
(United Kingdom) T Moore	7	5
(Russia) M Sirotkina	4	6	6
(Ukraine) A Kalinina	6	3	4
(Austria) T Paszek	6	6
5	(Paraguay) V Cepede Royg	3	3
3	(Czech Republic) P Cetkovská	6	6
WC	(United Kingdom) L Deigman	1	3
(United Kingdom) N Broady	6	2	6
WC	(United Kingdom) G Taylor	4	6	3
(United Kingdom) A Carreras	3	6	6
WC	(United Kingdom) F Stephenson	6	3	3
(France) J Coin	3	2
7	(France) S Foretz	6	6

Second round
1	(Russia) V Diatchenko	3	6	6
(United Kingdom) T Moore	6	2	4
(Russia) M Sirotkina	2	3
(Austria) T Paszek	6	6
3	(Czech Republic) P Cetkovská	1	5
(United Kingdom) N Broady	6	7
(United Kingdom) A Carreras	6	2	6
7	(France) S Foretz	4	6	3

Quarterfinals
1	(Russia) V Diatchenko	6	6
(Austria) T Paszek	4	4
(United Kingdom) N Broady	6	6
(United Kingdom) A Carreras	1	4

Semifinals
1	(Russia) V Diatchenko	6	6
(United Kingdom) N Broady	1	3

=== Bottom half ===
First round
6	(Estonia) A Kontaveit	6	6
Q	(United Kingdom) J Drew	1	2
(United Kingdom) N Cavaday	7^{8}	0	3
(United Kingdom) E Webley-Smith	6^{6}	6	6
(Spain) G García Pérez	7^{7}	6
(Republic of Ireland) A Bowtell	6^{2}	2
PR	(Romania) M Buzărnescu	7	6
4	(Luxembourg) M Minella	5	1
8	(Japan) N Osaka	6	6
Q	(Brazil) L Stefani	4	4
(Switzerland) X Knoll	6	6
WC	(United Kingdom) G Axon	1	1
(United Kingdom) H Dart	6	6
(Ukraine) L Kichenok	4	1
(Australia) A Bai	1	3
2	(Chinese Taipei) S-w Hsieh	6	6

Second round
6	(Estonia) A Kontaveit	6	6
(United Kingdom) E Webley-Smith	0	2
(Spain) G García Pérez	6	6
PR	(Romania) M Buzărnescu	2	4
8	(Japan) N Osaka	0	7^{7}	6
(Switzerland) X Knoll	6	6^{4}	0
(United Kingdom) H Dart	5	5
2	(Chinese Taipei) S-w Hsieh	7	7

Quarterfinals
6	(Estonia) A Kontaveit	6	6
(Spain) G García Pérez	3	3
8	(Japan) N Osaka	6	6^{5}	6
2	(Chinese Taipei) S-w Hsieh	4	7^{7}	3

Semifinals
6	(Estonia) A Kontaveit	4	7^{7}	2
8	(Japan) N Osaka	6	6^{5}	6
