= 2015 Aegon Surbiton Trophy – Men's doubles =

Men's doubles
- 2015 Aegon Surbiton Trophy

Final
- Champion: (United Kingdom) Ken Skupski (United Kingdom) Neal Skupski
- Runner-up: (New Zealand) Marcus Daniell (Brazil) Marcelo Demoliner
- Score: 6–3, 6–4

Events
Singles	men	women
Doubles	men	women
← 2008 ·	Aegon Surbiton Trophy	· 2016 →

This was the first edition of the tournament since 2008.

The brothers Ken and Neal Skupski won the tournament, defeating Marcus Daniell and Marcelo Demoliner in the final, 6–3, 6–4.

== Seeds ==
1. (United States) Eric Butorac / (United Kingdom) Colin Fleming (semifinals)
2. (Sweden) Johan Brunström / (Israel) Jonathan Erlich (first round)
3. (New Zealand) Marcus Daniell / (Brazil) Marcelo Demoliner (final)
4. (France) Fabrice Martin / (India) Purav Raja (first round)

== Draw ==
=== Key ===
- Q = Qualifier
- WC = Wild card
- LL = Lucky loser
- Alt = Alternate
- SE = Special exempt
- PR = Protected ranking
- ITF = ITF entry
- JE = Junior exempt
- w/o = Walkover
- r = Retired
- d = Defaulted
- SR = Special ranking

=== Draw ===
First round
1	(United States) E Butorac (United Kingdom) C Fleming	6	6
Alt	(Japan) H Moriya (China) Z Zhang	2	1
(India) Y Bhambri (India) D Sharan	7^{7}	6
WC	(United Kingdom) L Bambridge (United Kingdom) L Broady	6^{5}	4
3	(New Zealand) M Daniell (Brazil) M Demoliner	3	7^{7}	[10]
(Australia) A Bolt (Australia) A Whittington	6	6^{2}	[7]
(Italy) T Fabbiano (Italy) L Vanni	6	7
(China) M Gong (India) S Myneni	2	5
(Russia) K Kravchuk (United States) D Kudla	2	1
(Belgium) N Desein (Netherlands) I Sijsling	6	6
(Australia) M Ebden (United Kingdom) J Ward	5	6	[10]
4	(France) F Martin (India) P Raja	7	4	[6]
WC	(United Kingdom) S Thornley (United Kingdom) D Walsh	4	6	[5]
(India) S Devvarman (Chinese Taipei) J Wang	6	3	[10]
(United Kingdom) K Skupski (United Kingdom) N Skupski	0	6	[10]
2	(Sweden) J Brunström (Israel) J Erlich	6	4	[4]

Quarterfinals
1	(United States) E Butorac (United Kingdom) C Fleming	6	7^{7}
(India) Y Bhambri (India) D Sharan	4	6^{3}
3	(New Zealand) M Daniell (Brazil) M Demoliner	6	6
(Italy) T Fabbiano (Italy) L Vanni	3	4
(Belgium) N Desein (Netherlands) I Sijsling
(Australia) M Ebden (United Kingdom) J Ward	w/o
(India) S Devvarman (Chinese Taipei) J Wang	1	4
(United Kingdom) K Skupski (United Kingdom) N Skupski	6	6

Semifinals
1	(United States) E Butorac (United Kingdom) C Fleming	4	2
3	(New Zealand) M Daniell (Brazil) M Demoliner	6	6
(Belgium) N Desein (Netherlands) I Sijsling	3	4
(United Kingdom) K Skupski (United Kingdom) N Skupski	6	6

Final
3	(New Zealand) M Daniell (Brazil) M Demoliner	4	3
(United Kingdom) K Skupski (United Kingdom) N Skupski	6	6
