= 2015 Aegon Surbiton Trophy – Women's doubles =

Women's doubles
- 2015 Aegon Surbiton Trophy

Final
- Champions: (Ukraine) Lyudmyla Kichenok (Switzerland) Xenia Knoll
- Runners-up: (United Kingdom) Tara Moore (United Kingdom) Nicola Slater
- Score: 7–6^{(8–6)}, 6–3

Events
Singles	men	women
Doubles	men	women
← 2008 ·	Aegon Surbiton Trophy	· 2016 →

This was the first edition of the tournament since 2008.

Lyudmyla Kichenok and Xenia Knoll won the title, defeating Tara Moore and Nicola Slater in the final, 7–6^{(8–6)}, 6–3.

== Seeds ==
1. (Ukraine) Lyudmyla Kichenok / (Switzerland) Xenia Knoll (champions)
2. (Paraguay) Verónica Cepede Royg / (Luxembourg) Mandy Minella (semifinals)
3. (Brazil) Beatriz Haddad Maia / (Croatia) Petra Martić (quarterfinals)
4. (France) Julie Coin / (France) Stéphanie Foretz (semifinals)

== Draw ==
=== Key ===
- Q = Qualifier
- WC = Wild card
- LL = Lucky loser
- Alt = Alternate
- SE = Special exempt
- PR = Protected ranking
- ITF = ITF entry
- JE = Junior exempt
- w/o = Walkover
- r = Retired
- d = Defaulted
- SR = Special ranking

First round
1	(Ukraine) L Kichenok (Switzerland) X Knoll	6	6
(Romania) M Buzărnescu (Serbia) A Krunić	1	4
(United Kingdom) L Brown (United Kingdom) L Deigman	w/o
(United Kingdom) A Carreras (Spain) G García Pérez
4	(France) J Coin (France) S Foretz	6	6
WC	(United Kingdom) G Axon (United Kingdom) H Dart	4	1
(United Kingdom) N Cavaday (United Kingdom) F Stephenson	6	6
WC	(United Kingdom) JA Ashgar (United Kingdom) E Van Heuvelen	2	2
(United Kingdom) SB Askew (United Kingdom) A Gibson	1	4
(United Kingdom) T Moore (United Kingdom) N Slater	6	6
WC	(United Kingdom) M Crouch (United Kingdom) E Hurst	1	0
3	(Brazil) B Haddad Maia (Croatia) P Martić	6	6
(Czech Republic) P Cetkovská (Austria) T Paszek	2	6	[16]
(United Kingdom) N Broady (United Kingdom) E Webley-Smith	6	2	[14]
(Australia) A Bai (Australia) N Bains	4	2
2	(Paraguay) V Cepede Royg (Luxembourg) M Minella	6	6

Quarterfinals
1	(Ukraine) L Kichenok (Switzerland) X Knoll	4	6	[10]
(United Kingdom) A Carreras (Spain) G García Pérez	6	3	[5]
4	(France) J Coin (France) S Foretz	7^{7}	6
(United Kingdom) N Cavaday (United Kingdom) F Stephenson	6^{1}	2
(United Kingdom) T Moore (United Kingdom) N Slater	6	6
3	(Brazil) B Haddad Maia (Croatia) P Martić	3	4
(Czech Republic) P Cetkovská (Austria) T Paszek	7^{7}	3	[6]
2	(Paraguay) V Cepede Royg (Luxembourg) M Minella	6^{3}	6	[10]

Semifinals
1	(Ukraine) L Kichenok (Switzerland) X Knoll	6	6
4	(France) J Coin (France) S Foretz	3	2
(United Kingdom) T Moore (United Kingdom) N Slater	6	6
2	(Paraguay) V Cepede Royg (Luxembourg) M Minella	4	3

Final
1	(Ukraine) L Kichenok (Switzerland) X Knoll	7^{8}	6
(United Kingdom) T Moore (United Kingdom) N Slater	6^{6}	3
