= U.S. Pro Women's Clay Court Championships =

- 2022 U.S. Pro Women's Clay Court Championships

ITF Women's Tour
- Event name: U.S. Pro Women's Clay Court Championships (2022–); Innisbrook Open (2012–19)
- Location: Palm Harbor, Florida, United States
- Venue: Innisbrook Resort and Golf Club
- Category: ITF Women's Circuit
- Surface: Clay
- Draw: 32S/24Q/16D
- Prize money: $100,000
- Website: www.springtennisfestival.com

The U.S. Pro Women's Clay Court Championships is a tournament for professional female tennis players played on outdoor clay courts. The event is classified as a $100,000 ITF Women's Circuit tournament and has been held in Palm Harbor, Florida, United States, since 2012.

== Past finals ==
=== Singles ===
Year	Champion	Runner-up	Score
2022	(United States) Katie Volynets	(China) Wang Xiyu	6–4, 6–3
2020–21	tournament cancelled due to the COVID-19 pandemic		
2019	(Czech Republic) Barbora Krejčíková	(United States) Nicole Gibbs	6–0, 6–1
2016–18	not held		
2015	(United States) Katerina Stewart	(Ukraine) Maryna Zanevska	1–6, 6–3, 2–0 ret.
2014	(United States) Grace Min	(United States) Nicole Gibbs	7–5, 6–0
2013 (2)	(Israel) Julia Glushko	(Austria) Patricia Mayr-Achleitner	2–6, 6–0, 6–4
2013 (1)	(Slovenia) Tadeja Majerič	(Croatia) Ajla Tomljanović	6–2, 6–3
2012	(United States) Grace Min	(United States) Gail Brodsky	2–6, 6–2, 6–4

=== Doubles ===
Year	Champions	Runners-up	Score
2022	(United States) Sophie Chang (United States) Angela Kulikov	(Romania) Irina Bara (Italy) Lucrezia Stefanini	6–4, 3–6, [10–8]
2020–21	tournament cancelled due to the COVID-19 pandemic		
2019	(United States) Quinn Gleason (United States) Ingrid Neel	(Uzbekistan) Akgul Amanmuradova (Australia) Lizette Cabrera	5–7, 7–5, [10–8]
2016–18	not held		
2015	(Brazil) Paula Cristina Gonçalves (Czech Republic) Petra Krejsová	(Argentina) María Irigoyen (Argentina) Paula Ormaechea	6–2, 6–4
2014	(Italy) Gioia Barbieri (United States) Julia Cohen	(United States) Allie Kiick (United States) Sachia Vickery	7–6^{(7–5)}, 6–0
2013 (2)	(Australia) Ashleigh Barty (France) Alizé Lim	(Brazil) Paula Cristina Gonçalves (Argentina) María Irigoyen	6–1, 6–3
2013 (1)	(Norway) Ulrikke Eikeri (United States) Chieh-Yu Hsu	(Argentina) Florencia Molinero (Venezuela) Adriana Pérez	6–3, 6–0
2012	(Belarus) Darya Kustova (Romania) Raluca Olaru	(Italy) Gioia Barbieri (Russia) Nadejda Guskova	6–3, 6–1
