= Jovana Jović =

Serbian tennis player (born 1993)

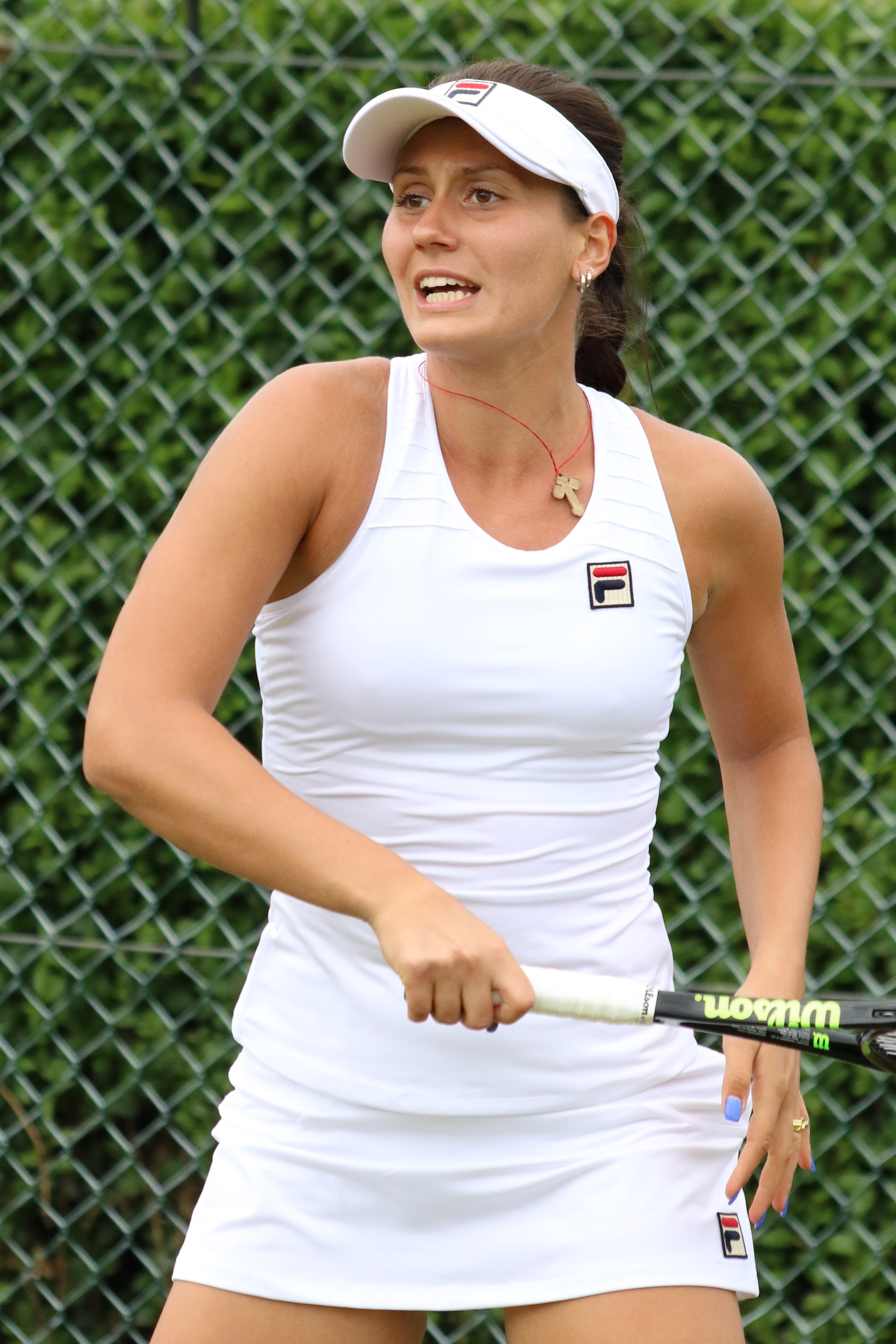
- Jović at the 2016 Wimbledon
- Full name: Jovana Jović
- Country (sports): Serbia
- Born: 30 September 1993 (age 32) Belgrade, Serbia, FR Yugoslavia (now Serbia)
- Height: 1.80 m (5 ft 11 in)
- Turned pro: 2009
- Retired: March 2022 (last match played in March 2021)
- Plays: Right-handed (two-handed backhand)
- Prize money: US$ 512,978

Singles
- Career record: 311–233
- Career titles: 17 ITF
- Highest ranking: No. 102 (12 May 2014)

Grand Slam singles results
- Australian Open: Q2 (2014)
- French Open: 1R (2014)
- Wimbledon: 1R (2014)
- US Open: Q2 (2014, 2016, 2019)

Doubles
- Career record: 79–101
- Career titles: 4 ITF
- Highest ranking: No. 204 (31 July 2017)

Team competitions
- Fed Cup: 2–3

Jovana Jović (née Jakšić; 30 September 1993) is a Serbian former professional tennis player. Jović won 17 singles titles and four doubles titles on the ITF Women's Circuit. On 12 May 2014, she reached her best singles ranking of world No. 102, after getting into the WTA tournament final in Monterrey. On 31 July 2017, she peaked at No. 204 in the doubles rankings.

Playing for Serbia Fed Cup team, Jović has a win–loss record of 2–3. She made her Fed Cup debut in February 2014, losing to Canada's Eugenie Bouchard in straight sets in their World Group II tie, but winning the dead doubles rubber the following day.

On 17 November 2019, she married her long-time boyfriend Vujadin Jović.

Jović stepped away from professional tennis in March 2021 and announced her retirement on 5 March 2022.

== Career ==
=== 2013 ===
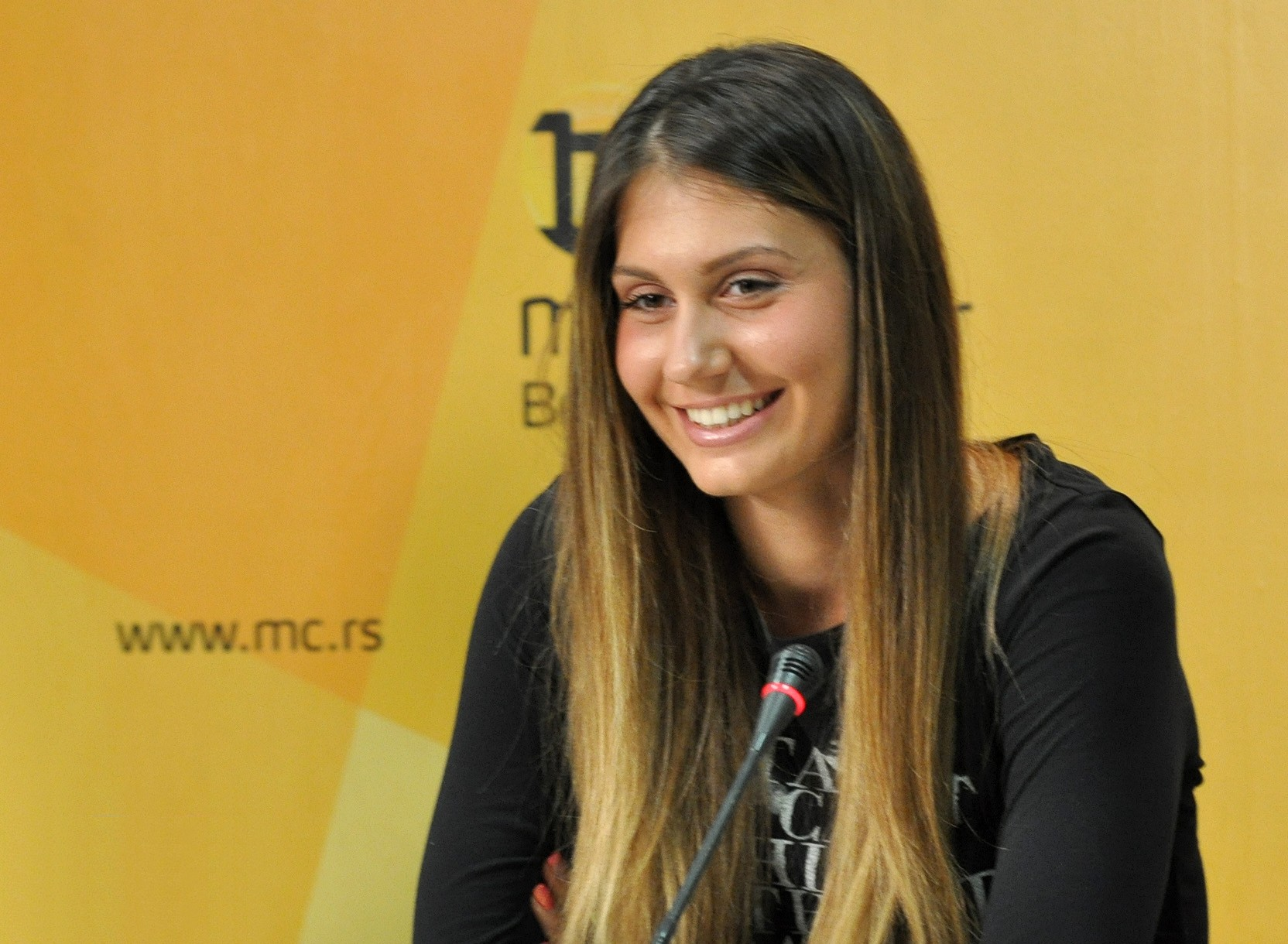
Jović in 2013

Jović made her debut on the WTA Tour, qualifying for the main draw of the Monterrey Open and defeating Vera Dushevina in the first round. She lost in the second round to the third seed Maria Kirilenko in three sets.

=== 2014 ===
Jović reached her first career WTA final at the Monterrey Open, losing to fellow Serb Ana Ivanovic in straight sets. In May, she made her Grand Slam main-draw debut at the French Open, losing in the first round to 31st seed Daniela Hantuchová, in three sets. At Wimbledon, she lost to Petra Cetkovská in the first round, in three sets as well.

== Performance timelines ==
Key
W	F	SF	QF	#R	RR	Q#	DNQ	A	NH

(W) winner; (F) finalist; (SF) semifinalist; (QF) quarterfinalist; (#R) rounds 4, 3, 2, 1; (RR) round-robin stage; (Q#) qualification round; (DNQ) did not qualify; (A) absent; (NH) not held; (SR) strike rate (events won / competed); (W–L) win–loss record.
To avoid confusion and double counting, these charts are updated at the conclusion of a tournament or when the player's participation has ended.

Only main-draw results in WTA Tour, Grand Slam tournaments, Olympic Games and Fed Cup/Billie Jean King Cup are included in win–loss records.

=== Singles ===
Tournament	2013	2014	2015	2016	2017	2018	2019	2020	2021	SR	W–L	Win%
Grand Slam
Australian Open	A	Q2	Q1	Q1	A	A	A	Q1	Q1	0 / 0	0–0	–
French Open	A	1R	Q1	Q1	A	A	A	Q1	A	0 / 1	0–1	0%
Wimbledon	Q1	1R	A	Q2	A	A	A	NH	A	0 / 1	0–1	0%
US Open	Q1	Q2	A	Q2	A	A	Q2	A	A	0 / 0	0–0	–
Win–loss	0–0	0–2	0–0	0–0	0–0	0–0	0–0	0–0	0–0	0 / 2	0–2	0%
National representation
Billie Jean King Cup	A	WG2	A	PO	Absent					0 / 2	0–2	0%
WTA 1000
Indian Wells Open	A	A	Q1	A	A	A	A	NH	A	0 / 0	0–0	–
Miami Open	A	A	Q1	A	A	A	A	NH	A	0 / 0	0–0	–
Canadian Open	A	A	A	A	A	A	Q1	A	A	0 / 0	0–0	–
Career statistics
Tournaments	2	8	1	1	0	0	0	0	0	Career total: 12		
Titles	0	0	0	0	0	0	0	0	0	Career total: 0		
Finals	0	1	0	0	0	0	0	0	0	Career total: 1		
Overall win–loss	1–2	4–9	0–1	0–2	0–0	0–0	0–0	0–0	0–0	0 / 12	5–14	26%
Win%	33%	31%	0%	0%	–	–	–	–	–	Career total: 26%		
Year-end ranking (Note: 2009: WTA ranking–1023, tournaments–0, 2010: WTA ranking–1073, tournaments–0, 2011: WTA ranking–600, tournaments–0 and 2012: WTA ranking–420, tournaments–0.)	167	115	179	263	312	291	227	240	399	$512,978		

== WTA career finals ==
=== Singles: 1 (runner–up) ===
Legend Grand Slam WTA 1000 WTA 500 WTA 250 (0–1)	Finals by surface Hard (0–1) Clay (0–0) Grass (0–0) Carpet (0–0)

Result	Date	Tournament	Tier	Surface	Opponent	Score
Loss	Apr 2014	Monterrey Open, Mexico	International (Note: In 2021, the WTA Premier tournaments were reclassified as WTA 500 tournaments and WTA International tournaments as WTA 250 tournaments.)	Hard	(Serbia) Ana Ivanovic	2–6, 1–6

== ITF Circuit finals ==
=== Singles: 28 (17 titles, 11 runner–ups) ===
Legend $50,000 tournaments $25,000 tournaments $10,000 tournaments	Finals by surface Hard (7–6) Clay (9–5) Carpet (1–0)

Result	W–L	Date	Tournament	Tier	Surface	Opponent	Score
Win	1–0	Jul 2011	ITF Prokuplje, Serbia	10,000	Clay	(Hungary) Zsófia Susányi	6–2, 6–3
Loss	1–1	Aug 2011	ITF Vinkovci, Croatia	10,000	Clay	(Croatia) Indire Akiki	6–3, 0–6, 2–6
Loss	1–2	Oct 2011	ITF Plovdiv, Bulgaria	10,000	Clay	(Germany) Dinah Pfizenmaier	4–6, 4–6
Loss	1–3	Oct 2011	ITF Pirot, Serbia	10,000	Clay	(Serbia) Natalija Kostić	3–6, 3–6
Win	2–3	Nov 2011	ITF Antalya, Turkey	10,000	Clay	(Ukraine) Ganna Poznikhirenko	6–4, 6–2
Win	3–3	Mar 2012	ITF Mumbai, India	10,000	Hard	(Israel) Keren Shlomo	6–3, 7–6^{(5)}
Win	4–3	Sep 2012	ITF Antalya, Turkey	10,000	Clay	(Czech Republic) Zuzana Zálabská	7–5, 7–5
Win	5–3	Oct 2012	ITF Antalya, Turkey	10,000	Clay	(Germany) Lena-Marie Hofmann	6–2, 6–3
Win	6–3	Nov 2012	ITF Antalya, Turkey	10,000	Clay	(Ukraine) Ganna Poznikhirenko	6–2, 7–6^{(3)}
Win	7–3	Nov 2012	ITF Antalya, Turkey	10,000	Clay	(Croatia) Ana Konjuh	6–3, 6–1
Win	8–3	Nov 2012	ITF Antalya, Turkey	10,000	Clay	(Romania) Laura-Ioana Paar	6–2, 6–0
Win	9–3	Feb 2013	ITF Antalya, Turkey	10,000	Clay	(Bosnia and Herzegovina) Jasmina Tinjić	5–2 ret.
Win	10–3	Feb 2013	ITF Antalya, Turkey	10,000	Clay	(Romania) Ioana Ducu	6–2, 7–5
Loss	10–4	Mar 2013	ITF Antalya, Turkey	10,000	Clay	(Romania) Raluca Olaru	3–6, 5–7
Win	11–4	Apr 2013	ITF Poza Rica, Mexico	25,000	Hard	(United States) Julia Cohen	2–6, 6–3, 6–4
Win	12–4	May 2013	ITF Balikpapan, Indonesia	25,000	Hard	(China) Yang Zi	6–3, 6–2
Win	13–4	May 2013	ITF Tarakan, Indonesia	25,000	Hard (i)	(China) Li Ting	6–3, 6–2
Loss	13–5	Jul 2013	ITF Wrexham, United Kingdom	25,000	Hard	(Latvia) Diāna Marcinkēviča	7–5, 5–7, 2–6
Win	14–5	Feb 2014	ITF Surprise, United States	25,000	Hard	(Austria) Tamira Paszek	4–6, 7–6^{(13)}, 7–5
Loss	14–6	May 2014	Anning Open, China	50,000 (Note: The $50,000 tournaments were reclassified as $60,000 in 2017.)	Clay	(China) Zheng Saisai	2–6, 3–6
Loss	14–7	Oct 2014	Challenger de Saguenay, Canada	50,000	Hard (i)	(France) Julie Coin	5–7, 3–6
Win	15–7	Oct 2015	Challenger de Saguenay, Canada	50,000	Hard (i)	(Switzerland) Amra Sadiković	6–3, 6–7^{(5)}, 6–1
Loss	15–8	Nov 2015	Toronto Challenger, Canada	50,000	Hard (i)	(Germany) Tatjana Maria	3–6, 2–6
Win	16–8	Jun 2017	ITF Wuhan, China	25,000	Hard	(China) Liu Fangzhou	6–0, 3–6, 6–2
Loss	16–9	Jun 2018	ITF Singapore	25,000	Hard	(Japan) Hiroko Kuwata	6–7^{(4)}, 0–6
Loss	16–10	Aug 2018	ITF Guiyang, China	25,000	Hard	(Russia) Anastasia Gasanova	3–6, 4–6
Win	17–10	May 2019	ITF Karuizawa, Japan	25,000	Carpet	(Japan) Momoko Kobori	6–1, 4–6, 7–5
Loss	17–11	Jul 2019	ITF Tianjin, China	25,000	Hard	(China) Wang Xinyu	4–6, 2–6

=== Doubles: 8 (4 titles, 4 runner–ups) ===
Legend $60,000 tournaments $25,000 tournaments $10,000 tournaments	Finals by surface Hard (3–4) Clay (1–0) Carpet (0–0)

Result	W–L	Date	Tournament	Tier	Surface	Partner	Opponents	Score
Loss	0–1	Oct 2010	ITF Monastir, Tunisia	10,000	Hard	(Belarus) Sasha Khabibulina	(Russia) Irina Glimakova (Russia) Polina Monova	2–6, 6–1, [7–10]
Win	1–1	Aug 2015	ITF Winnipeg, Canada	25,000	Hard	(Canada) Sharon Fichman	(United States) Kristie Ahn (United States) Lorraine Guillermo	6–2, 6–1
Win	2–1	Apr 2017	ITF Charlottesville, United States	60,000	Clay	(Argentina) Catalina Pella	(United States) Madison Brengle (United States) Danielle Collins	6–4, 7–6^{(5)}
Loss	2–2	Jul 2017	Gold River Challenger, U.S.	60,000	Hard	(Belarus) Vera Lapko	(United States) Desirae Krawczyk (Mexico) Giuliana Olmos	1–6, 2–6
Win	3–2	Sep 2017	ITF Stillwater, United States	25,000	Hard	(United States) Caitlin Whoriskey	(United Kingdom) Harriet Dart (Belgium) An-Sophie Mestach	4–6, 6–4, [10–3]
Win	4–2	Jul 2018	Ashland Classic, United States	60,000	Clay	(Mexico) Renata Zarazúa	(United States) Sanaz Marand (United States) Whitney Osuigwe	6–3, 5–7, [10–4]
Loss	4–3	Mar 2020	Las Vegas Open, United States	25,000	Hard	(Switzerland) Conny Perrin	(United States) Lorraine Guillermo (United States) Maegan Manasse	6–0, 2–6, [4–10]
Loss	4–4	Jan 2021	Georgia's Rome Open, U.S.	60,000	Hard	(Belarus) Olga Govortsova	(United States) Emina Bektas (United Kingdom) Tara Moore	7–5, 2–6, [8–10]
