= Gail Brodsky =

American tennis player

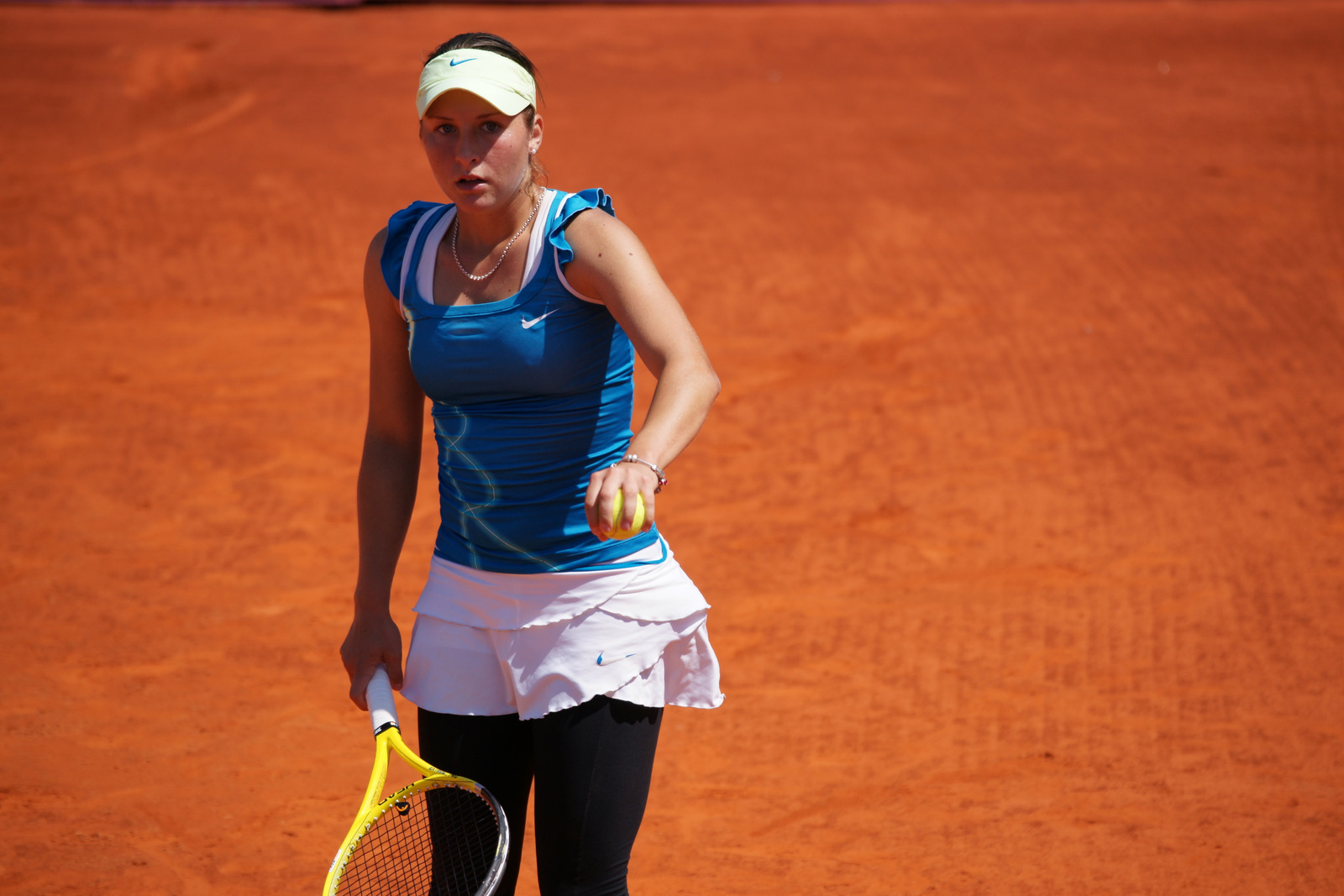
- Brodsky at the 2011 Open de Cagnes-sur-Mer
- Native name: Гейл Бродскі
- Country (sports): United States
- Residence: Brooklyn, New York
- Born: June 5, 1991 (age 35) Zaporizhzhia, Ukraine
- Height: 1.65 m (5 ft 5 in)
- Turned pro: 2007
- Plays: Right (two-handed backhand)
- Prize money: $179,263

Singles
- Career record: 188–136
- Career titles: 6 ITF
- Highest ranking: No. 182 (March 19, 2012)

Grand Slam singles results
- French Open: Q1 (2012)
- Wimbledon: Q1 (2012)
- US Open: 1R (2008, 2009)

Doubles
- Career record: 47–73
- Career titles: 2 ITF
- Highest ranking: No. 348 (May 2, 2011)

Grand Slam doubles results
- US Open: 1R (2008, 2009)

Gail Brodsky (Note: Ukrainian: Гейл Бродскі, romanized: Heil Brodski) (born June 5, 1991) is an American former professional tennis player. Her career-high WTA singles ranking is 182, reached in March 2012. On 2 May 2011, she peaked at No. 348 in the doubles rankings. On the ITF Circuit, she won six singles and two doubles titles. In 2008, she won the USTA Girls’ 18s national title.

== Career ==
Brodsky was born in Zaporizhzhia, Ukraine, to Eduard and Julia, moved to Ocean Parkway across the street from Coney Island Hospital in Brighton Beach, Brooklyn, when she was six, and is Jewish. As a youth, she trained on public courts in Manhattan Beach, Brooklyn. She and her husband and two children live in Kirkland, Washington.

She won the 2008 USTA Girls’ 18s national title, defeating Sloane Stephens, the 2017 US Open champion, and CoCo Vandeweghe, the 2017 US Open semifinalist, at 17 years of age. She thus earned a wildcard to the 2008 US Open, where she lost in the first round to world No. 14, Agnes Szavay. She was also given a wildcard into the 2009 US Open, where she lost in the first round to Anabel Medina Garrigues, in straight sets.

She said: “I grew up with a lot of pressure and not a lot of passion for the sport.” Her parents were strict about her diet and other aspects of her life; it was only after she broke all contact with them (she says: “it wasn't a healthy situation”), at age 17, that she tasted her first French fry.

In 2007 and 2010, she won the Ojai Tennis Tournament in women's singles. She also won the 2010 Porto, 2011 Gosier and La Coruna, 2015 Victoria, and 2018 Victoria and $60k Ashland singles titles.

She also won the 2010 Landisville (w/Alexandra Mueller) and the 2018 Victoria (w/Brynn Boren) doubles titles.

== ITF Circuit finals ==
Legend
$60,000 tournaments
$25,000 tournaments
$10/15,000 tournaments

=== Singles: 9 (6 titles, 3 runner-ups) ===
Result	W–L	Date	Tournament	Tier	Surface	Opponent	Score
Loss	0–1	Jul 2010	ITF Gausdal, Norway	10,000	Hard	(France) Victoria Larrière	3–6, 4–6
Win	1–1	Oct 2010	ITF Porto, Portugal	10,000	Clay	(Germany) Karolina Nowak	7–5, 6–1
Win	2–1	Jan 2011	ITF Gosier, France	10,000	Hard (i)	(United States) Sachia Vickery	6–3, 2–6, 6–2
Win	3–1	Jul 2011	ITF La Coruña, Spain	25,000	Clay	(Russia) Alexandra Panova	6–3, 6–4
Loss	3–2	Jan 2012	U.S. Clay Court Championships	25,000	Hard	(United States) Grace Min	6–2, 2–6, 4–6
Loss	3–3	Jan 2012	ITF Plantation, United States	25,000	Clay	(United States) Lauren Davis	4–6, 1–6
Win	4–3	Jun 2015	ITF Victoria, Canada	10,000	Hard (i)	(Hungary) Naomi Totka	3–6, 6–2, 7–6^{(3)}
Win	5–3	Jun 2018	ITF Victoria, Canada	10,000	Hard (i)	(United States) Maegan Manasse	3–6, 6–2, 6–3
Win	6–3	Jul 2018	Ashland Tennis Classic, US	60,000	Hard	(United States) Maegan Manasse	4–6, 6–1, 6–0

=== Doubles: 4 (2 titles, 2 runner-ups) ===
Result	W–L	Date	Tournament	Tier	Surface	Partner	Opponents	Score
Win	1–0	23 May 2010	ITF Landisville, United States	10,000	Hard	(United States) Alexandra Mueller	(New Zealand) Dianne Hollands (Australia) Tiffany Welford	4–6, 7–5, [10–2]
Loss	1–1	2 October 2010	ITF Porto, Portugal	10,000	Clay	(United States) Alexandra Riley	(Norway) Ulrikke Eikeri (Germany) Lena-Marie Hofmann	7–6^{(4)}, 6–7^{(5)}, [5–10]
Win	2–1	24 June 2018	ITF Victoria, Canada	15,000	Hard (i)	(United States) Brynn Boren	(United States) Safiya Carrington (United States) Alana Smith	6–1, 6–2
Loss	2–2	23 June 2019	ITF Denver, United States	25,000	Hard	(United States) Brynn Boren	(Montenegro) Vladica Babić (United States) Hayley Carter	2–6, 3–6

== See also ==
- List of notable Jewish tennis players
