= Maegan Manasse =

American tennis player

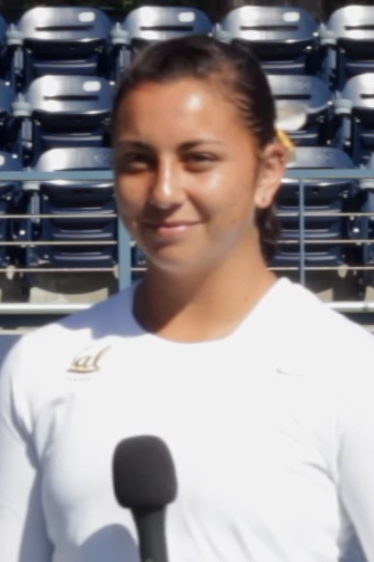
- Maegan Manasse in 2016
- Country (sports): United States
- Born: April 16, 1995 (age 31) Redondo Beach, California
- Height: 1.68 m (5 ft 6 in)
- Plays: Right (two-handed backhand)
- Prize money: $60,920

Singles
- Career record: 102–68
- Career titles: 0 WTA, 1 ITF
- Highest ranking: No. 327 (July 15, 2019)

Doubles
- Career record: 63–31
- Career titles: 1 WTA Challenger
- Highest ranking: No. 175 (July 29, 2019)

Maegan Manasse (born April 16, 1995) is an American former tennis player.

== Career ==
She has career-high WTA rankings of 327 in singles, reached on July 15, 2019, and 175 in doubles, achieved on July 29, 2019.

Manasse won a WTA 125 title at the 2018 Houston Challenger, in the doubles draw, partnering Jessica Pegula. She has also won seven doubles titles on the ITF Women's Circuit.

Her last appearance on the circuit was at Berkeley, California, where she won her eighth ITF doubles title.

== WTA Challenger finals ==
=== Doubles: 1 (title) ===
Result	Date	Tournament	Surface	Partner	Opponents	Score
Win	Nov 2018	Houston Challenger, United States	Hard	(United States) Jessica Pegula	(United States) Desirae Krawczyk (Mexico) Giuliana Olmos	1–6, 6–4, [10–8]

== ITF Circuit finals ==
=== Singles: 3 (1 title, 2 runner-ups) ===
Legend W60 tournaments W15 tournaments	Finals by surface Hard (1–2)

Result	W–L	Date	Tournament	Tier	Surface	Opponent	Score
Loss	0–1	Jun 2018	ITF Victoria, Canada	W15	Hard (i)	(United States) Gail Brodsky	6–3, 2–6, 3–6
Loss	0–2	Jul 2018	Ashland Tennis Classic, United States	W60	Hard	(United States) Gail Brodsky	6–4, 1–6, 0–6
Win	1–2	Mar 2024	ITF Hinode, Japan	W15	Hard	(Japan) Aoi Ito	6–3, 6–2

=== Doubles: 11 (8 titles, 3 runner-ups) ===
Legend W50 tournaments W25/35 tournaments W10/15 tournaments	Finals by surface Hard (6–3) Clay (2–0)

Result	W–L	Date	Tournament	Tier	Surface	Partner	Opponents	Score
Loss	0–1	Jul 2015	ITF El Paso, US	25k	Hard	(United States) Robin Anderson	(United States) Jennifer Brady (Chile) Alexa Guarachi	6–3, 3–6, [7–10]
Win	1–1	Aug 2015	ITF Fort Worth, US	10k	Hard	(United States) Josie Kuhlman	(United States) Jessica Ho (Mexico) Giuliana Olmos	6–4, 6–4
Loss	1–2	Jul 2016	Stockton Challenger, US	50k	Hard	(United States) Robin Anderson	(Czech Republic) Kristýna Plíšková (Belgium) Alison Van Uytvanck	2–6, 3–6
Win	2–2	Jun 2018	ITF Bethany Beach, US	25k	Clay	(United States) Robin Anderson	(United States) Quinn Gleason (United States) Sanaz Marand	2–6, 7–6^{(6)}, [10–3]
Win	3–2	Mar 2019	ITF Osaka, Japan	W25	Hard	(United States) Robin Anderson	(Japan) Risa Ushijima (Japan) Minori Yonehara	7–6^{(2)}, 6–3
Loss	3–3	Jun 2019	ITF Nonthaburi, Thailand	W25	Hard	(United States) Lorraine Guillermo	(Mexico) Victoria Rodríguez (Uzbekistan) Sabina Sharipova	3–6, 4–6
Win	4–3	Mar 2020	Las Vegas Open, US	W25	Hard	(United States) Lorraine Guillermo	(Serbia) Jovana Jović (Switzerland) Conny Perrin	0–6, 6–2, [10–4]
Win	5–3	Mar 2021	ITF Newport Beach, US	W25	Hard	(United States) Vania King	(United States) Emina Bektas (United Kingdom) Tara Moore	6–4, 6–2
Win	6–3	Oct 2021	ITF Austin, US	W25	Hard	(United States) Elysia Bolton	(United States) Rasheeda McAdoo (United States) Chanelle Van Nguyen	6–1, 7–5
Win	7–3	Apr 2022	ITF Orlando, US	W25	Clay	(United States) Catherine Harrison	(Chinese Taipei) Hsieh Yu-chieh (Chinese Taipei) Hsu Chieh-yu	6–1, 6–0
Win	8–3	Sep 2024	Berkeley Tennis Club Challenge, US	W35	Hard	(Australia) Elysia Bolton	(India) Rutuja Bhosale (United States) Ema Burgić	6–7^{(3)}, 6–2, [10–6]
