= Sanaz Marand =

American tennis player

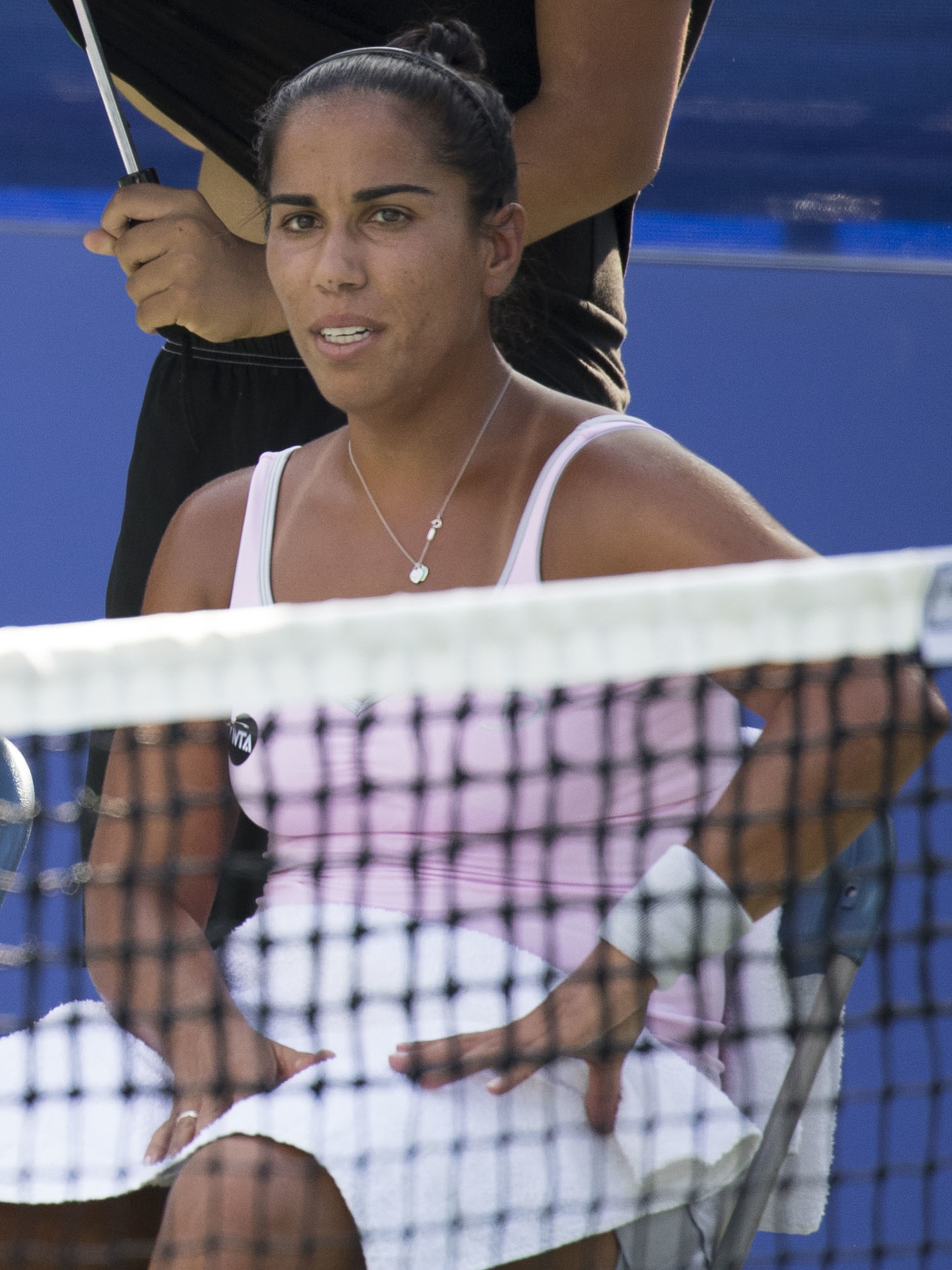
- Country (sports): United States
- Born: June 21, 1988 (age 38) Katy, Texas, U.S.
- Plays: Left-handed (two-handed backhand)
- Prize money: $158,037

Singles
- Career record: 232–204
- Career titles: 2 ITF
- Highest ranking: No. 242 (October 27, 2014)

Doubles
- Career record: 229–170
- Career titles: 20 ITF
- Highest ranking: No. 119 (November 9, 2015)

Sanaz Marand (Persian: ساناز مرند; born June 21, 1988) is an American former tennis player.

In her career, she won two singles titles and 20 doubles titles on the ITF Women's Circuit. In October 2014, she reached her best singles ranking of world No. 242. In November 2015, she peaked at No. 119 in the doubles rankings.

Marand made her WTA Tour debut at the 2014 Washington Open in doubles, partnering with Louisa Chirico; they lost to Arina Rodionova and Olivia Rogowska in the first round.

Marand played collegiate tennis at the University of North Carolina at Chapel Hill, where she received All American honors and graduated in 2010.

== ITF Circuit finals ==
=== Singles: 5 (2 titles, 3 runner–ups) ===
Legend $25,000 tournaments $10/15,000 tournaments	Finals by surface Hard (1–1) Clay (1–2)

Result	W–L	Date	Tournament	Tier	Surface	Opponent	Score
Loss	0–1	Jun 2012	ITF Bethany Beach, United States	10,000	Clay	(Serbia) Vojislava Lukić	2–6, 5–7
Win	1–1	May 2013	ITF El Paso, United States	25,000	Hard	(Japan) Naomi Osaka	6–4, 6–4
Loss	1–2	Feb 2015	ITF Surprise, United States	25,000	Hard	(Sweden) Sofia Arvidsson	2–6, 1–6
Win	2–2	Jul 2017	ITF Istanbul, Turkey	15,000	Clay	(Turkey) Ayla Aksu	6–1, 6–4
Loss	2–3	Jul 2017	ITF Istanbul, Turkey	15,000	Clay	(Georgia (country)) Ekaterine Gorgodze	2–6, 1–6

=== Doubles: 37 (20 titles, 17 runner–ups) ===
Legend $100,000 tournaments $75/80,000 tournaments $50/60,000 tournaments $25,000 tournaments $10/15,000 tournaments	Finals by surface Hard (9–9) Clay (10–8) Grass (1–0)

Outcome	No.	Date	Tournament	Surface	Partner	Opponents	Score
Winner	1.	July 14, 2008	ITF Atlanta, United States	Hard	(United States) Kristi Miller	(United States) Whitney Jones (United States) Tiya Rolle	6–2, 6–4
Winner	2.	June 21, 2010	ITF Cleveland, United States	Clay	(United States) Caitlin Whoriskey	(United States) Emily Harman (United States) Eleanor Peters	6–4, 6–0
Runner-up	1.	October 18, 2010	ITF Rock Hill, United States	Hard	(United States) Caitlin Whoriskey	(Brazil) Maria Fernanda Alves (Colombia) Mariana Duque	1–6, 6–4, 4–6
Runner-up	2.	February 27, 2012	ITF Antalya, Turkey	Clay	(United Kingdom) Nicola Slater	(Italy) Claudia Giovine (Germany) Anne Schäfer	3–6, 6–3, [7–10]
Runner-up	3.	March 12, 2012	ITF Antalya, Turkey	Clay	(Italy) Claudia Giovine	(Italy) Gioia Barbieri (Italy) Anastasia Grymalska	4–6, 6–1, [9–11]
Winner	3.	June 4, 2012	ITF El Paso, United States	Hard	(United States) Ashley Weinhold	(Oman) Fatma Al-Nabhani (Bolivia) María Fernanda Álvarez Terán	6–4, 6–3
Winner	4.	June 11, 2012	ITF Bethany Beach, United States	Clay	(United States) Jacqueline Cako	(Ukraine) Anastasia Kharchenko (Russia) Nika Kukharchuk	6–1, 6–2
Winner	5.	September 10, 2012	ITF Redding, United States	Hard	(United States) Jacqueline Cako	(United States) Macall Harkins (Chinese Taipei) Hsu Chieh-yu	7–6^{(5)}, 7–5
Runner-up	4.	May 20, 2013	ITF Sumter, United States	Hard	(United States) Jamie Loeb	(United States) Kristy Frilling (United States) Alexandra Mueller	4–6, 3–6
Runner-up	5.	July 15, 2013	ITF Portland, United States	Clay	(United States) Ashley Weinhold	(United States) Irina Falconi (United States) Nicole Melichar	6–4, 3–6, [8–10]
Runner-up	6.	January 6, 2014	ITF Vero Beach, United States	Clay	(United States) Jacqueline Cako	(Russia) Irina Khromacheva (United States) Allie Will	5–7, 3–6
Runner-up	7.	February 17, 2014	ITF Surprise, United States	Hard (i)	(United States) Ashley Weinhold	(Japan) Shuko Aoyama (Japan) Eri Hozumi	3–6, 5–7
Runner-up	8.	April 28, 2014	ITF Indian Harbour Beach, United States	Clay	(United States) Jan Abaza	(United States) Asia Muhammad (United States) Taylor Townsend	2–6, 1–6
Winner	6.	June 2, 2014	ITF Brescia, Italy	Clay	(Argentina) Florencia Molinero	(United States) Louisa Chirico (United States) Asia Muhammad	6–4, 4–6, [10–8]
Winner	7.	June 22, 2014	ITF Lenzerheide, Switzerland	Clay	(United States) Louisa Chirico	(South Korea) Jang Su-jeong (Poland) Justyna Jegiołka	6–3, 6–4
Winner	8.	August 10, 2014	ITF Landisville, United States	Hard	(United States) Jamie Loeb	(United States) Lena Litvak (United States) Alexandra Mueller	7–6^{(5)}, 6–1
Winner	9.	October 13, 2014	ITF Florence, United States	Hard	(United States) Jamie Loeb	(United States) Danielle Lao (United States) Keri Wong	6–3, 7–6^{(5)}
Runner-up	9.	January 17, 2015	ITF Plantation, United States	Clay	(United States) Jan Abaza	(Russia) Irina Khromacheva (United States) Asia Muhammad	2–6, 2–6
Winner	10.	January 25, 2015	ITF Daytona Beach, United States	Clay	(United States) Jan Abaza	(Belgium) Elise Mertens (Netherlands) Arantxa Rus	6–4, 3–6, [10–6]
Winner	11.	July 13, 2015	Stockton Challenger, United States	Hard	(United States) Jamie Loeb	(United States) Kaitlyn Christian (United States) Danielle Lao	6–3, 6–4
Winner	12.	September 21, 2015	ITF Albuquerque, United States	Hard	(Brazil) Paula Cristina Gonçalves	(Austria) Tamira Paszek (United States) Anna Tatishvili	4–6, 6–2, [10–3]
Runner-up	10.	September 28, 2015	Las Vegas Open, United States	Clay	(Brazil) Paula Cristina Gonçalves	(United States) Julia Boserup (United States) Nicole Gibbs	3–6, 4–6
Runner-up	11.	October 31, 2015	Classic of Macon, United States	Hard (i)	(Brazil) Paula Cristina Gonçalves	(United States) Jan Abaza (Switzerland) Viktorija Golubic	6–7^{(3)}, 5–7
Winner	13.	June 11, 2016	Surbiton Trophy, UK	Grass	(United States) Melanie Oudin	(United States) Robin Anderson (Australia) Alison Bai	6–4, 7–5
Winner	14.	March 12, 2017	ITF Orlando, United States	Hard	(United States) Emina Bektas	(United States) Chiara Scholl (Mexico) Marcela Zacarías	6–1, 6–3
Runner-up	12.	March 19, 2017	ITF Tampa, United States	Hard (i)	(United States) Emina Bektas	(Chile) Alexa Guarachi (Chinese Taipei) Hsu Chieh-yu	3–6, 6–4, [4–10]
Winner	15.	April 15, 2017	ITF Pelham, United States	Clay	(United States) Emina Bektas	(United Kingdom) Amanda Carreras (Croatia) Tena Lukas	w/o
Winner	16.	April 23, 2017	ITF Dothan, United States	Clay	(United States) Emina Bektas	(United States) Kristie Ahn (Australia) Lizette Cabrera	6–3, 1–6, [10–2]
Winner	17.	May 12, 2017	ITF Naples, United States	Clay	(United States) Emina Bektas	(United States) Danielle Collins (United States) Taylor Townsend	7–6^{(1)}, 6–1
Winner	18.	July 1, 2017	ITF Istanbul, Turkey	Clay	(Turkey) Melis Sezer	(Croatia) Ena Kajević (Turkey) İpek Öz	6–2, 7–6^{(1)}
Runner-up	13.	October 28, 2017	Classic of Macon, United States	Hard	(Brazil) Paula Cristina Gonçalves	(United States) Kaitlyn Christian (United States) Sabrina Santamaria	1–6, 0–6
Winner	19.	April 8, 2018	ITF Jackson, United States	Clay	(United States) Whitney Osuigwe	(Italy) Gaia Sanesi (South Africa) Chanel Simmonds	6–1, 6–3
Runner-up	14.	June 9, 2018	ITF Bethany Beach, United States	Clay	(United States) Quinn Gleason	(United States) Robin Anderson (United States) Maegan Manasse	6–2, 6–7^{(6)}
Runner-up	15.	July 14, 2018	ITF Winnipeg, Canada	Hard	(Israel) Julia Glushko	(Japan) Akiko Omae (Mexico) Victoria Rodriguez	6–7^{(2)}, 3–6
Runner-up	16.	July 28, 2018	Ashland Classic, United States	Hard	(United States) Whitney Osuigwe	(Serbia) Jovana Jakšić (Mexico) Renata Zarazúa	3–6, 7–5, [4–10]
Runner-up	17.	August 4, 2018	Lexington Challenger, United States	Hard	(Mexico) Victoria Rodriguez	(United States) Hayley Carter (United States) Ena Shibahara	3–6, 1–6
Winner	20.	July 27, 2019	Ashland Classic, United States	Hard	(United States) Caitlin Whoriskey	(Montenegro) Vladica Babić (Sweden) Julia Rosenqvist	7–6^{(4)}, 6–4
