= 2026 Qatar ExxonMobil Open =

- Date: 16–21 February 2026
- Edition: 34th
- Category: ATP Tour 500
- Draw: 32S / 16D
- Surface: Hard / outdoor
- Location: Doha, Qatar
- Venue: Khalifa International Tennis and Squash Complex

Champions

Singles
- (Spain) Carlos Alcaraz

Doubles
- (Finland) Harri Heliövaara / (United Kingdom) Henry Patten
- Qatar ExxonMobil Open

The 2026 Qatar Open, also known as Qatar ExxonMobil Open for sponsorship reasons, was the 34th edition of the Qatar Open, a men's tennis tournament played on outdoor hard courts. It was part of the ATP 500 tournaments of the 2026 ATP Tour and took place at the Khalifa International Tennis and Squash Complex in Doha, Qatar from 16 to 21 February 2026.

== Champions ==
=== Singles ===
- (Spain) Carlos Alcaraz def. (France) Arthur Fils, 6–2, 6–1

=== Doubles ===
- (Finland) Harri Heliövaara / (United Kingdom) Henry Patten def. (United Kingdom) Julian Cash / (United Kingdom) Lloyd Glasspool, 6–3, 6–3

== Singles main-draw entrants ==
=== Seeds ===
Country	Player	Rank^{1}	Seed
ESP	Carlos Alcaraz	1	1
ITA	Jannik Sinner	2	2
~~KAZ~~	~~Alexander Bublik~~	~~10~~	~~3~~
	Daniil Medvedev	11	4
	Andrey Rublev	15	5
CZE	Jakub Menšík	16	6
	Karen Khachanov	18	7
CZE	Jiří Lehečka	21	8

- ^{1} Rankings are as of 9 February 2026.

=== Other entrants ===
The following players received wildcards into the singles main draw:

- (Tunisia) Moez Echargui
- (Lebanon) Hady Habib
- (Qatar) Mubarak Shannan Zayid

The following players received entry using a protected ranking:

- (China) Shang Juncheng
- (China) Zhang Zhizhen

The following players received entry from the qualifying draw:

- (Spain) Roberto Carballés Baena
- (Spain) Pablo Carreño Busta
- (United Kingdom) Jan Choinski
- (France) Pierre-Hugues Herbert

The following players received entry as lucky losers:

- (France) Quentin Halys
- (Japan) Shintaro Mochizuki

=== Withdrawals ===
- (Canada) Félix Auger-Aliassime → replaced by (Poland) Kamil Majchrzak
- (Kazakhstan) Alexander Bublik → replaced by (France) Quentin Halys (LL)
- (Serbia) Novak Djokovic → replaced by (France) Valentin Royer
- (Spain) Jaume Munar → replaced by (Japan) Shintaro Mochizuki (LL)
- (Canada) Denis Shapovalov → replaced by (China) Zhang Zhizhen

== Doubles main-draw entrants ==
=== Seeds ===
Country	Player	Country	Player	Rank^{1}	Seed
GBR	Julian Cash	GBR	Lloyd Glasspool	5	1
ESA	Marcelo Arévalo	CRO	Mate Pavić	12	2
FIN	Harri Heliövaara	GBR	Henry Patten	18	3
POR	Francisco Cabral	AUT	Lucas Miedler	39	4

- ^{1} Rankings are as of 9 February 2026.

=== Other entrants ===
The following pairs received wildcards into the doubles main draw:

- (Morocco) Reda Bennani / (Spain) Pablo Carreño Busta
- (Tunisia) Moez Echargui / (Qatar) Mubarak Shannan Zayid

The following pair received entry from the qualifying draw:

- (France) Quentin Halys / (France) Pierre-Hugues Herbert

The following pairs received entry as lucky losers:

- (Romania) Victor Cornea / (Poland) Szymon Walków
- (Czech Republic) Petr Nouza / (Czech Republic) Patrik Rikl

=== Withdrawals ===
- (Kazakhstan) Alexander Bublik / (China) Shang Juncheng → replaced by (Czech Republic) Petr Nouza / (Czech Republic) Patrik Rikl
- (Czech Republic) Tomáš Macháč / (Spain) Jaume Munar → replaced by (Romania) Victor Cornea / (Poland) Szymon Walków
