= 2024 Delray Beach Open =

- Date: February 12–18
- Edition: 32nd
- Draw: 28S / 16D
- Prize money: $661,585
- Surface: Hard
- Location: Delray Beach, United States
- Venue: Delray Beach Tennis Center

Champions

Singles
- (United States) Taylor Fritz

Doubles
- (United Kingdom) Julian Cash / (United States) Robert Galloway
- Delray Beach Open

The 2024 Delray Beach Open was a professional men's tennis tournament played on hard courts. It was the 32nd edition of the tournament and part of the 2024 ATP Tour. It took place in Delray Beach, United States between February 12 and February 18, 2024.

== Finals ==
=== Singles ===
- (United States) Taylor Fritz def. (United States) Tommy Paul, 6–2, 6–3

=== Doubles ===
- (United Kingdom) Julian Cash / (United States) Robert Galloway def. (Mexico) Santiago González / (United Kingdom) Neal Skupski 5–7, 7–5, [10–2]

== Singles main-draw entrants ==
=== Seeds ===
Country	Player	Rank^{1}	Seed
USA	Taylor Fritz	9	1
USA	Frances Tiafoe	14	2
USA	Tommy Paul	15	3
FRA	Adrian Mannarino	17	4
SRB	Miomir Kecmanović	40	5
ITA	Matteo Arnaldi	41	6
GBR	Dan Evans	42	7
AUS	Max Purcell	43	8

^{†} Rankings are as of 5 February 2024.

=== Other entrants ===
The following players received wildcards into the main draw:

- (United States) Aleksandar Kovacevic
- (United States) Patrick Kypson
- (United States) Emilio Nava

The following player received a Late Entry into the main draw:

- (United States) Frances Tiafoe

The following player received entry into the singles main draw under the ATP Next Gen programme for players aged under 20 and ranked in the top 250:

- (China) Shang Juncheng

The following players received entry from the qualifying draw:

- (Moldova) Radu Albot
- (Australia) Thanasi Kokkinakis
- (United States) Nicolas Moreno de Alboran
- (United States) Zachary Svajda

The following players received entry as lucky losers:

- (Italy) Flavio Cobolli
- (Canada) Gabriel Diallo

=== Withdrawals ===
- (Germany) Dominik Koepfer → replaced by (Canada) Gabriel Diallo
- (United States) Mackenzie McDonald → replaced by (Italy) Flavio Cobolli
- (United States) J. J. Wolf → replaced by (United States) Alex Michelsen

== Doubles main-draw entrants ==
=== Seeds ===
Country	Player	Country	Player	Rank^{1}	Seed
MEX	Santiago González	GBR	Neal Skupski	17	1
MON	Hugo Nys	POL	Jan Zieliński	51	2
GBR	Julian Cash	USA	Robert Galloway	102	3
ECU	Gonzalo Escobar	KAZ	Aleksandr Nedovyesov	104	4

- ^{1} Rankings are as of 5 February 2024.

=== Other entrants ===
The following pairs received wildcards into the main draw:

- (United States) William Blumberg / (Australia) Rinky Hijikata
- (United States) Nicholas Godsick / (United States) Ethan Quinn

The following pairs received entry as alternates:

- (Moldova) Radu Albot / (France) Constant Lestienne
- (United Kingdom) Liam Broady / (Mexico) Hans Hach Verdugo

=== Withdrawals ===
- (Italy) Flavio Cobolli / (United States) Aleksander Kovacevic → replaced by (United Kingdom) Liam Broady / (Mexico) Hans Hach Verdugo
- (Brazil) Marcelo Demoliner / (Sweden) André Göransson → replaced by (Sweden) André Göransson / (Venezuela) Luis David Martínez
- (Australia) James Duckworth / (United States) Alex Michelsen → replaced by (Moldova) Radu Albot / (France) Constant Lestienne
