= 2026 Mubadala DC Open =

Sports tournament

- Date: July 27–August 3, 2026
- Edition: 57th (men); 14th (women)
- Category: ATP 500 (men); WTA 500 (women)
- Draw: 32S/16D (men); 28S/16D (women)
- Prize money: $2,469,450 (men) $1,637,982 (women)
- Surface: Hard (outdoor)
- Location: Washington, D.C., U.S.
- Venue: William H.G. FitzGerald Tennis Center

Champions

Men's singles
- (United States) Taylor Fritz

Women's singles
- (Philippines) Alexandra Eala

Men's doubles
- (United Kingdom) Julian Cash / (United Kingdom) Lloyd Glasspool

Women's doubles
- (New Zealand) Erin Routliffe / (Indonesia) Aldila Sutjiadi
- Washington Open

The 2026 Washington Open (branded as the Mubadala DC Open for sponsorship reasons) was a tennis tournament played on outdoor hard courts. It was the 57th edition of the Washington Open for the men, and the 14th edition for the women. The event was an ATP 500 tournament on the 2026 ATP Tour and a WTA 500 tournament on the 2026 WTA Tour. The tournament took place at the William H.G. FitzGerald Tennis Center in Washington, D.C. from July 27 to August 3, 2026. The men's draw was reduced from 48 players to 32 players this year.

== Champions ==
=== Men's singles ===
- (United States) Taylor Fritz def. (Spain) Rafael Jódar, 7–6^{(7–2)}, 6–4

=== Women's singles ===
- (Philippines) Alexandra Eala def. (United States) Jessica Pegula 4–6, 6–4, 6–0

=== Men's doubles ===
- (United Kingdom) Julian Cash / (United Kingdom) Lloyd Glasspool def. (United States) Austin Krajicek / (Croatia) Nikola Mektić, 6–3, 6–4

=== Women's doubles ===
- (New Zealand) Erin Routliffe / (Indonesia) Aldila Sutjiadi def. (Slovenia) Andreja Klepač / (Japan) Makoto Ninomiya, 6–4, 6–1

== ATP singles main draw entrants ==
=== Seeds ===
Country	Player	Rank^{†}	Seed
AUS	Alex de Minaur	5	1
USA	Ben Shelton	6	2
USA	Taylor Fritz	10	3
ITA	Lorenzo Musetti	15	4
USA	Learner Tien	16	5
USA	Frances Tiafoe	17	6
CZE	Jakub Menšík	18	7
FRA	Arthur Fils	23	8

^{†} Rankings are as of July 20, 2026.

=== Other entrants ===
The following players received wildcards into the singles main draw:

- ~~(United Kingdom) Jack Draper~~
- (Japan) Kei Nishikori
- (United States) Ben Shelton
- (Greece) Stefanos Tsitsipas

The following player received entry using a protected ranking:

- (China) Shang Juncheng

The following players received entry from the qualifying draw:

- (United States) Martin Damm
- (United States) Marcos Giron
- (Australia) Cruz Hewitt
- (United States) Andres Martin
- (United States) Trevor Svajda
- (Australia) Aleksandar Vukic

The following players received entry as lucky losers:

- (United States) Mackenzie McDonald
- (United States) Zachary Svajda

=== Withdrawals ===
- (Canada) Félix Auger-Aliassime → replaced by (United States) Zachary Svajda
- (United Kingdom) Jack Draper → replaced by (United States) Mackenzie McDonald
- Daniil Medvedev → replaced by (France) Térence Atmane
- (France) Arthur Rinderknech → replaced by (China) Shang Juncheng

== ATP doubles main draw entrants ==
=== Seeds ===
Country	Player	Country	Player	Rank^{†}	Seed
ITA	Simone Bolelli	ITA	Andrea Vavassori	13	1
USA	Christian Harrison	GBR	Neal Skupski	19	2
GBR	Julian Cash	GBR	Lloyd Glasspool	24	3
ARG	Guido Andreozzi	FRA	Manuel Guinard	31	4

^{†} Rankings are as of July 20, 2026.

=== Other entrants ===
The following pairs received wildcard entry into the doubles main draw:

- (Ecuador) Diego Hidalgo / (United States) Ben Shelton
- ~~(Australia) Nick Kyrgios / (United States) Frances Tiafoe~~

The following pair received entry from the qualifying draw:

- (Brazil) Fernando Romboli / (Australia) John-Patrick Smith

The following pair received entry as lucky losers:

- (Uruguay) Ariel Behar / (India) Anirudh Chandrasekar

=== Withdrawals ===
- (Australia) Nick Kyrgios / (United States) Frances Tiafoe → replaced by (Uruguay) Ariel Behar / (India) Anirudh Chandrasekar

== WTA singles main draw entrants ==
=== Seeds ===
Country	Player	Rank^{†}	Seed
USA	Jessica Pegula	3	1
UKR	Elina Svitolina	10	2
JPN	Naomi Osaka	13	3
	Diana Shnaider	18	4
	Anna Kalinskaya	20	5
USA	Madison Keys	23	6
CAN	Leylah Fernandez	25	7
USA	Emma Navarro	27	8

^{†} Rankings are as of July 20, 2026.

=== Other entrants ===
The following players received wildcards into the singles main draw:

- (United States) Sofia Kenin
- (United States) Ashlyn Krueger
- (United States) Venus Williams
- (China) Zheng Qinwen

The following player received entry as a replacement Top 30 player:

- (United States) Jessica Pegula

The following players received entry from the qualifying draw:

- (Australia) Daria Kasatkina
- (Uzbekistan) Polina Kudermetova
- (United States) Julieta Pareja
- (Slovakia) Rebecca Šramková

=== Withdrawals ===
- (Romania) Jaqueline Cristian → replaced by (United Kingdom) Katie Boulter
- (United States) Iva Jovic → replaced by (Poland) Magdalena Fręch
- (Ukraine) Marta Kostyuk → replaced by (Italy) Elisabetta Cocciaretto
- (Italy) Jasmine Paolini → replaced by (United States) Jessica Pegula
- (Czech Republic) Kateřina Siniaková → replaced by (Poland) Magda Linette

== WTA doubles main draw entrants ==
=== Seeds ===
Country	Player	Country	Player	Rank^{†}	Seed
ITA	Sara Errani	USA	Nicole Melichar-Martinez	22	1
NZL	Erin Routliffe	INA	Aldila Sutjiadi	45	2
INA	Janice Tjen	CHN	Zhang Shuai	51	3
KAZ	Anna Danilina	CAN	Leylah Fernandez	73	4

^{†} Rankings are as of July 20, 2026.

=== Other entrants ===
The following pair received a wildcard into the doubles main draw:

- Diana Shnaider / (United States) Venus Williams
