= 2024 Surbiton Trophy – Women's singles =

Women's singles
- 2024 Surbiton Trophy

Final
- Champion: (Belgium) Alison Van Uytvanck
- Runner-up: (Germany) Tatjana Maria
- Score: 6–7^{(5–7)}, 6–1, 6–2

Events
Singles	men	women
Doubles	men	women
← 2023 ·	Surbiton Trophy	· 2025 →

Yanina Wickmayer was the reigning champion, but chose not to participate this year.

Alison Van Uytvanck won the title for the second time, after her 2022 triumph, defeating Tatjana Maria in the final, 6–7^{(5–7)}, 6–1, 6–2.

== Seeds ==
1. (China) Zhu Lin (first round)
2. (Germany) Tatjana Maria (final)
3. (Switzerland) Viktorija Golubic (first round)
4. (Belgium) Greet Minnen (quarterfinals)
5. (United Kingdom) Harriet Dart (second round)
6. (Germany) Jule Niemeier (second round)
7. (United States) Emina Bektas (first round)
8. (United States) Kayla Day (first round)

== Draw ==
Key

- Q = Qualifier
- WC = Wild card
- LL = Lucky loser
- Alt = Alternate
- ITF = ITF entry
- PR = Protected ranking
- SR = Special ranking
- SE = Special exempt
- JE = Junior exempt
- JR = Junior Accelerator Programme entrant
- CO = College Accelerator Programme entrant
- NG = Next Gen Accelerator Program entrant
- w/o = Walkover
- r = Retired
- d = Defaulted

=== Finals ===
Semifinals
SR	(Belgium) Alison Van Uytvanck	6	6
Q	(France) Harmony Tan	2	4
Q	(Australia) Olivia Gadecki	4	3
2	(Germany) Tatjana Maria	6	6

Final
SR	(Belgium) Alison Van Uytvanck	6^{5}	6	6
2	(Germany) Tatjana Maria	7^{7}	1	2

=== Top half ===
First round
1	(China) L Zhu	4	6	3
(Australia) T Preston	6	4	6
Q	(United Kingdom) E Appleton	6	6
(Czech Republic) L Fruhvirtová	4	4
SR	(Belgium) A Van Uytvanck	6	6
Q	(United States) A Smith	3	3
(United Kingdom) L Miyazaki	2	6	0
5	(United Kingdom) H Dart	6	4	6
4	(Belgium) G Minnen	6	6
WC	(United Kingdom) F Jones	3	4
(Ukraine) D Snigur	6^{4}	6^{4}
(United States) E Mandlik	7^{7}	7^{7}
Q	(Canada) C Zhao	4	4
WC	(United Kingdom) K Dunne	6	6
Q	(France) H Tan	4	6	6
8	(United States) K Day	6	3	4

Second round
(Australia) T Preston	3	2
Q	(United Kingdom) E Appleton	6	6
SR	(Belgium) A Van Uytvanck	6	3	6
5	(United Kingdom) H Dart	2	6	3
4	(Belgium) G Minnen	6	6
(United States) E Mandlik	2	2
WC	(United Kingdom) K Dunne	1	2
Q	(France) H Tan	6	6

Quarterfinals
Q	(United Kingdom) E Appleton	4	3
SR	(Belgium) A Van Uytvanck	6	6
4	(Belgium) G Minnen	4	6	2
Q	(France) H Tan	6	4	6

Semifinals
SR	(Belgium) A Van Uytvanck	6	6
Q	(France) H Tan	2	4

=== Bottom half ===
First round
7	(United States) E Bektas	6	4	4
Q	(Australia) A Tomljanović	4	6	6
(Australia) Ar Rodionova	6	7^{7}
(France) J Ponchet	4	6^{4}
Q	(Australia) O Gadecki	6	6
(Slovakia) V Hrunčáková	2	1
Q	(United Kingdom) N Bains	6	7
3	(Switzerland) V Golubic	2	5
6	(Germany) J Niemeier	6	6
(Switzerland) C Naef	3	1
Q	(Australia) K Birrell	6	6
(United States) S Vickery	2	3
(Canada) R Marino	6	6
WC	(United Kingdom) SB Grey	4	3
WC	(United Kingdom) S Kartal	4	7^{7}	4
2	(Germany) T Maria	6	6^{1}	6

Second round
Q	(Australia) A Tomljanović	7^{7}	0
(Australia) Ar Rodionova	6^{4}	0^{r}
Q	(Australia) O Gadecki	6	2	6
Q	(United Kingdom) N Bains	3	6	4
6	(Germany) J Niemeier	6	3	2
Q	(Australia) K Birrell	1	6	6
(Canada) R Marino	6^{2}	6	3
2	(Germany) T Maria	7^{7}	4	6

Quarterfinals
Q	(Australia) A Tomljanović	4	5
Q	(Australia) O Gadecki	6	7
Q	(Australia) K Birrell	1	4
2	(Germany) T Maria	6	6

Semifinals
Q	(Australia) O Gadecki	4	3
2	(Germany) T Maria	6	6
