= 2023 Sofia Open – Doubles =

Doubles
- 2023 Sofia Open

Final
- Champions: (Ecuador) Gonzalo Escobar (Kazakhstan) Aleksandr Nedovyesov
- Runners-up: (United Kingdom) Julian Cash (Croatia) Nikola Mektić
- Score: 6–3, 3–6, [13–11]

Details
- Draw: 16
- Seeds: 4

Events
Singles	Doubles
- ATP Sofia Open

Gonzalo Escobar and Aleksandr Nedovyesov defeated Julian Cash and Nikola Mektić in the final, 6–3, 3–6, [13–11] to win the doubles tennis title at the 2023 Sofia Open.

Rafael Matos and David Vega Hernández were the reigning champions, but Matos chose to compete in Metz instead. Vega Hernández partnered Íñigo Cervantes but lost in the first round to Yanaki Milev and Petr Nesterov.

== Seeds ==
1. (Belgium) Sander Gillé / (Belgium) Joran Vliegen (first round)
2. (United States) Nathaniel Lammons / (United States) Jackson Withrow (first round)
3. (United Kingdom) Julian Cash / (Croatia) Nikola Mektić (final)
4. (Austria) Alexander Erler / (Austria) Lucas Miedler (first round)

== Draw ==
Key

- Q = Qualifier
- WC = Wild card
- LL = Lucky loser
- Alt = Alternate
- ITF = ITF entry
- PR = Protected ranking
- SR = Special ranking
- SE = Special exempt
- JE = Junior exempt
- JR = Junior Accelerator Programme entrant
- CO = College Accelerator Programme entrant
- NG = Next Gen Accelerator Program entrant
- w/o = Walkover
- r = Retired
- d = Defaulted

=== Draw ===
First round
1	(Belgium) S Gillé (Belgium) J Vliegen	6^{9}	1
(Uruguay) A Behar (Czech Republic) A Pavlásek	7^{11}	6
(Italy) S Bolelli (Netherlands) M Middelkoop	6	6
WC	(Bulgaria) A Donski (Bulgaria) A Lazarov	4	4
3	(United Kingdom) J Cash (Croatia) N Mektić	4	6	[10]
(Serbia) N Ćaćić (Austria) P Oswald	6	1	[7]
(United States) E King (United States) R Stalder	7^{7}	4	[10]
(Portugal) F Cabral (United Kingdom) H Patten	6^{4}	6	[7]
Alt	(Spain) Í Cervantes (Spain) D Vega Hernández	3	4
WC	(Bulgaria) Y Milev (Bulgaria) P Nesterov	6	6
(Ecuador) G Escobar (Kazakhstan) A Nedovyesov	7	6
4	(Austria) A Erler (Austria) L Miedler	5	2
(Australia) A Harris (Australia) R Hijikata	6	1	[4]
(Australia) M Purcell (Australia) J-P Smith	4	6	[10]
(Kazakhstan) A Golubev (Ukraine) D Molchanov	7^{8}	2	[10]
2	(United States) N Lammons (United States) J Withrow	6^{6}	6	[7]

Quarterfinals
(Uruguay) A Behar (Czech Republic) A Pavlásek	7^{7}	7
(Italy) S Bolelli (Netherlands) M Middelkoop	6^{2}	5
3	(United Kingdom) J Cash (Croatia) N Mektić	6	6
(United States) E King (United States) R Stalder	3	3
WC	(Bulgaria) Y Milev (Bulgaria) P Nesterov	6	3	[5]
(Ecuador) G Escobar (Kazakhstan) A Nedovyesov	4	6	[10]
(Australia) M Purcell (Australia) J-P Smith	6	3	[10]
(Kazakhstan) A Golubev (Ukraine) D Molchanov	4	6	[8]

Semifinals
(Uruguay) A Behar (Czech Republic) A Pavlásek	5	4
3	(United Kingdom) J Cash (Croatia) N Mektić	7	6
(Ecuador) G Escobar (Kazakhstan) A Nedovyesov	6	6
(Australia) M Purcell (Australia) J-P Smith	3	2

Final
3	(United Kingdom) J Cash (Croatia) N Mektić	3	6	[11]
(Ecuador) G Escobar (Kazakhstan) A Nedovyesov	6	3	[13]
