= 2026 Qatar ExxonMobil Open – Doubles =

Doubles
- 2026 Qatar ExxonMobil Open

Final
- Champions: (Finland) Harri Heliövaara (United Kingdom) Henry Patten
- Runners-up: (United Kingdom) Julian Cash (United Kingdom) Lloyd Glasspool
- Score: 6–3, 6–3

Details
- Draw: 16
- Seeds: 4

Events
| Singles | Doubles |
- ATP Qatar Open

Harri Heliövaara and Henry Patten defeated defending champions Julian Cash and Lloyd Glasspool in the final, 6–3, 6–3 to win the doubles tennis title at the 2026 Qatar ExxonMobil Open.

== Seeds ==
1. (United Kingdom) Julian Cash / (United Kingdom) Lloyd Glasspool (final)
2. (El Salvador) Marcelo Arévalo / (Croatia) Mate Pavić (quarterfinals)
3. (Finland) Harri Heliövaara / (United Kingdom) Henry Patten (champions)
4. (Portugal) Francisco Cabral / (Austria) Lucas Miedler (quarterfinals)

== Draw ==
Key

- Q = Qualifier
- WC = Wild card
- LL = Lucky loser
- Alt = Alternate
- ITF = ITF entry
- PR = Protected ranking
- SR = Special ranking
- SE = Special exempt
- JE = Junior exempt
- JR = Junior Accelerator Programme entrant
- CO = College Accelerator Programme entrant
- NG = Next Gen Accelerator Program entrant
- w/o = Walkover
- r = Retired
- d = Defaulted

=== Draw ===
First round
1 | (United Kingdom) J Cash (United Kingdom) L Glasspool | 6 | 6
(France) U Humbert (France) A Rinderknech | 1 | 3
WC | (Tunisia) M Echargui (Qatar) MS Zayid | 2 | 3
(India) Y Bhambri (Sweden) A Göransson | 6 | 6
4 | (Portugal) F Cabral (Austria) L Miedler | 6 | 7^{7}
(Netherlands) S Arends (Monaco) R Arneodo | 3 | 6^{4}
WC | (Morocco) R Bennani (Spain) P Carreño Busta | 2 | 0
Q | (France) Q Halys (France) P-H Herbert | 6 | 6
(Australia) A Popyrin (Greece) S Tsitsipas | 6 | 6
LL | (Romania) V Cornea (Poland) S Walków | 3 | 0
K Khachanov; A Rublev | 5 | 3
3 | (Finland) H Heliövaara (United Kingdom) H Patten | 7 | 6
(Italy) S Bolelli (Italy) A Vavassori | 4 | 6 | [10]
(Czech Republic) A Pavlásek (Australia) J-P Smith | 6 | 3 | [4]
LL | (Czech Republic) P Nouza (Czech Republic) P Rikl | 6^{5} | 6^{6}
2 | (El Salvador) M Arévalo (Croatia) M Pavić | 7^{7} | 7^{8}

Quarterfinals
1 | (United Kingdom) J Cash (United Kingdom) L Glasspool | 6 | 6
(India) Y Bhambri (Sweden) A Göransson | 4 | 4
4 | (Portugal) F Cabral (Austria) L Miedler | 4 | 6^{3}
Q | (France) Q Halys (France) P-H Herbert | 6 | 7^{7}
(Australia) A Popyrin (Greece) S Tsitsipas | 6^{8} | 6^{5}
3 | (Finland) H Heliövaara (United Kingdom) H Patten | 7^{10} | 7^{7}
(Italy) S Bolelli (Italy) A Vavassori | 7^{7} | 3 | [10]
2 | (El Salvador) M Arévalo (Croatia) M Pavić | 6^{2} | 6 | [7]

Semifinals
1 | (United Kingdom) J Cash (United Kingdom) L Glasspool | 6 | 6
Q | (France) Q Halys (France) P-H Herbert | 2 | 3
3 | (Finland) H Heliövaara (United Kingdom) H Patten | 7 | 6
(Italy) S Bolelli (Italy) A Vavassori | 5 | 4

Final
1 | (United Kingdom) J Cash (United Kingdom) L Glasspool | 3 | 3
3 | (Finland) H Heliövaara (United Kingdom) H Patten | 6 | 6

== Qualifying ==
=== Seeds ===
1. (Czech Republic) Petr Nouza / (Czech Republic) Patrik Rikl (qualifying competition, lucky losers)
2. (France) Quentin Halys / (France) Pierre-Hugues Herbert (qualified)

=== Qualifiers ===
1. (France) Quentin Halys / (France) Pierre-Hugues Herbert

=== Lucky losers ===
1. (Czech Republic) Petr Nouza / (Czech Republic) Patrik Rikl
2. (Romania) Victor Cornea / (Poland) Szymon Walków

=== Qualifying draw ===
First round
1 | (Czech Republic) Petr Nouza (Czech Republic) Patrik Rikl | 7 | 7^{7}
(Romania) Victor Cornea (Poland) Szymon Walków | 5 | 6^{3}
WC | (Qatar) Ghanim Al Sulaiti (Turkey) Mert Alkaya | 2 | 1
2 | (France) Quentin Halys (France) Pierre-Hugues Herbert | 6 | 6

Qualifying competition
1 | (Czech Republic) Petr Nouza (Czech Republic) Patrik Rikl | 6^{7} | 4
2 | (France) Quentin Halys (France) Pierre-Hugues Herbert | 7^{9} | 6
