= 2024 Surbiton Trophy – Men's singles =

Men's singles
- 2024 Surbiton Trophy

Final
- Champion: (South Africa) Lloyd Harris
- Runner-up: (Switzerland) Leandro Riedi
- Score: 7–6^{(10–8)}, 7–5

Events
Singles	men	women
Doubles	men	women
← 2023 ·	Surbiton Trophy	· 2025 →

Andy Murray was the reigning champion but withdrew before the tournament began.

Lloyd Harris won the title after defeating Leandro Riedi 7–6^{(10–8)}, 7–5 in the final.

== Seeds ==
1. (United States) Alex Michelsen (first round)
2. (United Kingdom) Dan Evans (second round)
3. (Finland) Emil Ruusuvuori (first round)
4. (Australia) Christopher O'Connell (withdrew)
5. (United States) Mackenzie McDonald (second round)
6. (United States) Brandon Nakashima (semifinals)
7. (Australia) Aleksandar Vukic (second round)
8. (China) Shang Juncheng (first round)

== Draw ==
=== Key ===
- Q = Qualifier
- WC = Wild card
- LL = Lucky loser
- Alt = Alternate
- SE = Special exempt
- PR = Protected ranking
- ITF = ITF entry
- JE = Junior exempt
- w/o = Walkover
- r = Retired
- d = Defaulted
- SR = Special ranking

=== Finals ===
Semifinals
WC	(United Kingdom) Billy Harris	4	4
(South Africa) Lloyd Harris	6	6
Alt	(Switzerland) Leandro Riedi	6	3	6
6	(United States) Brandon Nakashima	4	6	1

Final
(South Africa) Lloyd Harris	7^{10}	7
Alt	(Switzerland) Leandro Riedi	6^{8}	5

=== Top half ===
First round
1	(United States) A Michelsen	4	6	2
Q	(United Kingdom) P Jubb	6	2	6
WC	(United Kingdom) A Fery	3	2
(Kazakhstan) M Kukushkin	6	6
(United States) E Nava	6	3	6^{3}
Q	(Australia) T Schoolkate	2	6	7^{7}
WC	(United Kingdom) B Harris	6	7^{10}
8	(China) J Shang	3	6^{8}
LL	(Australia) O Jasika	6	6^{3}	0
(Australia) J Duckworth	3	7^{7}	6
Alt	(United States) M Cressy	4	3
Alt	(Kazakhstan) B Zhukayev	6	6
Q	(Switzerland) M-A Hüsler	5	7^{7}	3
(South Africa) L Harris	7	6^{5}	6
(Canada) D Shapovalov	3	6^{0}
7	(Australia) A Vukic	6	7^{7}

Second round
Q	(United Kingdom) P Jubb	6	3	2
(Kazakhstan) M Kukushkin	1	6	6
Q	(Australia) T Schoolkate	4	6^{4}
WC	(United Kingdom) B Harris	6	7^{7}
(Australia) J Duckworth	4	6^{4}
Alt	(Kazakhstan) B Zhukayev	6	7^{7}
(South Africa) L Harris	6	7^{10}
7	(Australia) A Vukic	1	6^{8}

Quarterfinals
(Kazakhstan) M Kukushkin	7	6^{5}	6^{4}
WC	(United Kingdom) B Harris	5	7^{7}	7^{7}
Alt	(Kazakhstan) B Zhukayev	6	3	1
(South Africa) L Harris	3	6	6

Semifinals
WC	(United Kingdom) B Harris	4	4
(South Africa) L Harris	6	6

=== Bottom half ===
First round
5	(United States) M McDonald	7^{7}	6
Q	(Australia) A Bolt	6^{3}	0
Alt	(Japan) S Mochizuki	6^{4}	6	6
(France) T Atmane	7^{7}	1	4
Alt	(Switzerland) L Riedi	7	6
(Switzerland) D Stricker	5	3
Alt	(Japan) S Shimabukuro	6	6
3	(Finland) E Ruusuvuori	3	4
6	(United States) B Nakashima	6^{4}	7	7^{7}
Alt	(Italy) M Bellucci	7^{7}	5	6^{4}
(Brazil) J Fonseca	6	6
Q	(United Kingdom) K Edmund	2	1
(United States) Z Svajda	6	1	7^{7}
Q	(Netherlands) G Brouwer	1	6	6^{4}
(Australia) A Walton	4	7	6^{8}
2/WC	(United Kingdom) D Evans	6	5	7^{10}

Second round
5	(United States) M McDonald	6	4	2
Alt	(Japan) S Mochizuki	2	6	6
Alt	(Switzerland) L Riedi	5	6	6
Alt	(Japan) S Shimabukuro	7	4	4
6	(United States) B Nakashima	6	6^{4}	6
(Brazil) J Fonseca	2	7^{7}	0
(United States) Z Svajda	4	7^{7}	6
2/WC	(United Kingdom) D Evans	6	6^{5}	3

Quarterfinals
Alt	(Japan) S Mochizuki	4	1
Alt	(Switzerland) L Riedi	6	6
6	(United States) B Nakashima	7^{9}	6
(United States) Z Svajda	6^{7}	3

Semifinals
Alt	(Switzerland) L Riedi	6	3	6
6	(United States) B Nakashima	4	6	1
