= 2023 Sofia Open =

- Date: 6–11 November
- Edition: 8th
- Category: ATP 250 tournaments
- Draw: 28S / 16D
- Prize money: €597,900
- Surface: Hard (indoor)
- Location: Sofia, Bulgaria
- Venue: Arena Sofia

Champions

Singles
- (France) Adrian Mannarino

Doubles
- (Ecuador) Gonzalo Escobar / (Kazakhstan) Aleksandr Nedovyesov
- Sofia Open

The 2023 Sofia Open was a men's tennis tournament to be played on indoor hard courts. It was the eighth edition of the event and it was part of the ATP 250 tournaments on the 2023 ATP Tour. It was played at the Arena Sofia in Sofia, Bulgaria, from 6 November to 11 November 2023. The tournament replaced the 2023 edition of the Tel Aviv Open, which was canceled due to the Gaza war.

== Champions ==
=== Singles ===
- (France) Adrian Mannarino def. (United Kingdom) Jack Draper, 7–6^{(8–6)}, 2–6, 6–3

=== Doubles ===
- (Ecuador) Gonzalo Escobar / (Kazakhstan) Aleksandr Nedovyesov def. (United Kingdom) Julian Cash / (Croatia) Nikola Mektić 6–3, 3–6, [13–11]

== Singles main-draw entrants ==
=== Seeds ===
Country	Player	Rank^{1}	Seed
ITA	Lorenzo Musetti	22	1
FRA	Adrian Mannarino	25	2
GER	Jan-Lennard Struff	27	3
ARG	Sebastián Báez	29	4
~~AUS~~	~~Alexei Popyrin~~	~~39~~	~~5~~
AUS	Max Purcell	43	6
AUT	Sebastian Ofner	44	7
HUN	Márton Fucsovics	52	8
SRB	Miomir Kecmanović	53	9

- ^{1} Rankings are as of 30 October 2023.

=== Other entrants ===
The following players received wildcards into the main draw:

- (Turkey) Cem İlkel
- (Bulgaria) Alexandar Lazarov
- (Bulgaria) Dimitar Kuzmanov

The following players received entry from the qualifying draw:

- (France) Térence Atmane
- (United Kingdom) Billy Harris
- (Switzerland) Marc-Andrea Hüsler
- (Ukraine) Vitaliy Sachko

The following player received entry as a lucky loser:

- (United States) Nicolas Moreno de Alboran

=== Withdrawals ===
- (Spain) Alejandro Davidovich Fokina → replaced by (Hungary) Fábián Marozsán
- (Serbia) Laslo Djere → replaced by (Austria) Jurij Rodionov
- (Argentina) Tomás Martín Etcheverry → replaced by (Serbia) Hamad Medjedovic
- (United States) Taylor Fritz → replaced by (Hungary) Zsombor Piros
- (United States) Sebastian Korda → replaced by (United Kingdom) Jack Draper
- (United States) Mackenzie McDonald → replaced by (Spain) Albert Ramos Viñolas
- (Australia) Alexei Popyrin → replaced by (United States) Nicolas Moreno de Alboran
- (United States) Ben Shelton → replaced by (Australia) Christopher O'Connell
- (United States) Frances Tiafoe → replaced by (Germany) Maximilian Marterer
- (Australia) Aleksandar Vukic → replaced by (Spain) Roberto Carballés Baena

== Doubles main-draw entrants ==
=== Seeds ===
Country	Player	Country	Player	Rank^{1}	Seed
BEL	Sander Gillé	BEL	Joran Vliegen	50	1
USA	Nathaniel Lammons	USA	Jackson Withrow	51	2
GBR	Julian Cash	CRO	Nikola Mektić	80	3
AUT	Alexander Erler	AUT	Lucas Miedler	83	4

- ^{1} Rankings are as of 30 October 2023.

=== Other entrants ===
The following pairs received wildcards into the doubles main draw:

- (Bulgaria) Alexander Donski / (Bulgaria) Alexandar Lazarov
- (Bulgaria) Petr Nesterov / (Bulgaria) Yanaki Milev

The following pair received entry as alternates:

- (Spain) Íñigo Cervantes / (Spain) David Vega Hernández

=== Withdrawals ===
- (Argentina) Máximo González / (Argentina) Andrés Molteni → replaced by (Spain) Íñigo Cervantes / (Spain) David Vega Hernández
- (Spain) Marcel Granollers / (Argentina) Horacio Zeballos → replaced by (Serbia) Nikola Ćaćić / (Austria) Philipp Oswald
- (United States) Mackenzie McDonald / (Brazil) Marcelo Melo → replaced by (United States) Evan King / (United States) Reese Stalder
- (Australia) Max Purcell / (Australia) Jordan Thompson → replaced by (Australia) Max Purcell / (Australia) John-Patrick Smith
