= 2024 Delray Beach Open – Singles =

Singles
- 2024 Delray Beach Open

Final
- Champion: (United States) Taylor Fritz
- Runner-up: (United States) Tommy Paul
- Score: 6–2, 6–3

Details
- Draw: 28 (4 Q / 3 WC )
- Seeds: 8

Events
Singles	Doubles
- Delray Beach Open

Defending champion Taylor Fritz defeated Tommy Paul in the final, 6–2, 6–3 to win the singles tennis title at the 2024 Delray Beach Open. It was his seventh ATP Tour singles title, and he did not lose a set en route. Paul was seeking his second ATP Tour title in as many weeks, having won Dallas the week prior.

== Seeds ==
The top four seeds received a bye into the second round.

1. (United States) Taylor Fritz (champion)
2. (United States) Frances Tiafoe (semifinals)
3. (United States) Tommy Paul (final)
4. (France) Adrian Mannarino (second round)
5. (Serbia) Miomir Kecmanović (first round)
6. (Italy) Matteo Arnaldi (second round)
7. (United Kingdom) Dan Evans (first round)
8. (Australia) Max Purcell (first round)

== Draw ==
Key

- Q = Qualifier
- WC = Wild card
- LL = Lucky loser
- Alt = Alternate
- ITF = ITF entry
- PR = Protected ranking
- SR = Special ranking
- SE = Special exempt
- JE = Junior exempt
- JR = Junior Accelerator Programme entrant
- CO = College Accelerator Programme entrant
- NG = Next Gen Accelerator Program entrant
- w/o = Walkover
- r = Retired
- d = Defaulted

=== Finals ===
Semifinals
1	(United States) Taylor Fritz	7^{10}	6
(United States) Marcos Giron	6^{8}	2
3	(United States) Tommy Paul	6	6
2	(United States) Frances Tiafoe	2	2

Final
1	(United States) Taylor Fritz	6	6
3	(United States) Tommy Paul	2	3

=== Top half ===
First round
LL	(Canada) G Diallo	4	6^{1}
(Portugal) N Borges	6	7^{7}
(Australia) R Hijikata	6	1	6
(United Kingdom) L Broady	2	6	1
(Japan) Y Nishioka	6	4	3
6	(Italy) M Arnaldi	4	6	6
(United States) M Giron	6	7^{7}
WC	(United States) E Nava	4	6^{5}
(France) C Lestienne	6	6
(Australia) A Vukic	4	4
WC	(United States) P Kypson	6	7^{7}
5	(Serbia) M Kecmanović	4	6^{3}

Second round
1	(United States) T Fritz	7^{7}	6
(Portugal) N Borges	6^{5}	4
(Australia) R Hijikata	6	3	6
6	(Italy) M Arnaldi	2	6	4
4	(France) A Mannarino	0	7^{7}	1
(United States) M Giron	6	6^{5}	6
(France) C Lestienne	4	4
WC	(United States) P Kypson	6	6

Quarterfinals
1	(United States) T Fritz	6	6
(Australia) R Hijikata	3	3
(United States) M Giron	6	6
WC	(United States) P Kypson	4	4

Semifinals
1	(United States) T Fritz	7^{10}	6
(United States) M Giron	6^{8}	2

=== Bottom half ===
First round
7	(United Kingdom) D Evans	5	0
(Australia) J Thompson	7	6
WC	(United States) A Kovacevic	2	6^{3}
Q	(United States) N Moreno de Alboran	6	7^{7}
(United States) A Michelsen	6	6
Q	(Australia) T Kokkinakis	1	2
8	(Australia) M Purcell	5	3
Q	(United States) Z Svajda	7	6
LL	(Italy) F Cobolli	1	6	7^{7}
(Japan) T Daniel	6	2	6^{1}
Q	(Moldova) R Albot	4	6	6
(China) J Shang	6	4	2

Second round
(Australia) J Thompson	6	6
Q	(United States) N Moreno de Alboran	2	2
(United States) A Michelsen	7	4	6^{4}
3	(United States) T Paul	5	6	7^{7}
Q	(United States) Z Svajda	4	7^{7}	4
LL	(Italy) F Cobolli	6	6^{1}	6
Q	(Moldova) R Albot	6^{5}	6^{4}
2	(United States) F Tiafoe	7^{7}	7^{7}

Quarterfinals
(Australia) J Thompson	4	3
3	(United States) T Paul	6	6
LL	(Italy) F Cobolli	4	2
2	(United States) F Tiafoe	6	6

Semifinals
3	(United States) T Paul	6	6
2	(United States) F Tiafoe	2	2

== Qualifying ==
=== Seeds ===
1. (Italy) Flavio Cobolli (qualifying competition, lucky loser)
2. (Australia) Thanasi Kokkinakis (qualified)
3. (Moldova) Radu Albot (qualified)
4. (Canada) Gabriel Diallo (qualifying competition, lucky loser)
5. (Japan) Shintaro Mochizuki (qualifying competition)
6. (France) Térence Atmane (qualifying competition)
7. (United States) Zachary Svajda (qualified)
8. (United States) Nicolas Moreno de Alboran (qualified)

=== Qualifiers ===
1. (United States) Nicolas Moreno de Alboran
2. (Australia) Thanasi Kokkinakis
3. (Moldova) Radu Albot
4. (United States) Zachary Svajda

=== Lucky losers ===
1. (Italy) Flavio Cobolli
2. (Canada) Gabriel Diallo

=== Qualifying draw ===
==== First qualifier ====
First round
1	(Italy) Flavio Cobolli	6	6
Alt	(Ukraine) Illya Marchenko	4	2
Alt	(Japan) Sho Shimabukuro	6^{2}	7^{7}	6^{2}
8	(United States) Nicolas Moreno de Alboran	7^{7}	6^{4}	7^{7}

Qualifying competition
1	(Italy) Flavio Cobolli	7	2	3
8	(United States) Nicolas Moreno de Alboran	5	6	6

==== Second qualifier ====
First round
2	(Australia) Thanasi Kokkinakis	6	6
Alt	(United States) Brandon Holt	4	3
WC	(United States) Stefan Kozlov	3	6^{2}
5	(Japan) Shintaro Mochizuki	6	7^{7}

Qualifying competition
2	(Australia) Thanasi Kokkinakis	6	6
5	(Japan) Shintaro Mochizuki	3	0

==== Third qualifier ====
First round
3	(Moldova) Radu Albot	6	6
Alt	(Denmark) August Holmgren	3	4
Alt	(United States) Preston Brown	2	2
6	(France) Térence Atmane	6	6

Qualifying competition
3	(Moldova) Radu Albot	7	6
6	(France) Térence Atmane	5	4

==== Fourth qualifier ====
First round
4	(Canada) Gabriel Diallo	6	6
Alt	(Monaco) Valentin Vacherot	4	4
WC	(United States) Ethan Quinn	3	3
7	(United States) Zachary Svajda	6	6

Qualifying competition
4	(Canada) Gabriel Diallo	4	6	3
7	(United States) Zachary Svajda	6	4	6
