= 2024 Surbiton Trophy =

Tennis tournament

- Date: 3–9 June 2024
- Edition: 19th (men); 20th (women)
- Category: ATP Challenger Tour; ITF Women's World Tennis Tour
- Surface: Grass / Outdoor
- Location: Surbiton, United Kingdom

Champions

Men's singles
- (South Africa) Lloyd Harris

Women's singles
- (Belgium) Alison Van Uytvanck

Men's doubles
- (United Kingdom) Julian Cash / (United States) Robert Galloway

Women's doubles
- (United States) Emina Bektas / (Serbia) Aleksandra Krunić
← 2023 ·	Surbiton Trophy	· 2025 →

The 2024 Surbiton Trophy (also known as the Lexus Surbiton Trophy for sponsorship reasons) was a professional tennis tournament played on outdoor grass courts. The event was part of the 2024 ATP Challenger Tour and the 2024 ITF Women's World Tennis Tour. It took place in Surbiton, United Kingdom between 3 and 9 June 2024. This was the 19th edition of the tournament for the men, and the 20th edition for the women.

== Champions ==
=== Men's singles ===
- (South Africa) Lloyd Harris def. (Switzerland) Leandro Riedi 7–6^{(10–8)}, 7–5.

=== Men's doubles ===
- (United Kingdom) Julian Cash / (United States) Robert Galloway def. (Colombia) Nicolás Barrientos / (Ecuador) Diego Hidalgo 6–4, 6–4.

=== Women's singles ===
- (Belgium) Alison Van Uytvanck def. (Germany) Tatjana Maria, 6–7^{(5–7)}, 6–1, 6–2

=== Women's doubles ===
- (United States) Emina Bektas / (Serbia) Aleksandra Krunić def. (United Kingdom) Sarah Beth Grey / (United Kingdom) Tara Moore 6–1, 6–1

== Men's singles main draw entrants ==
=== Seeds ===
Country	Player	Rank^{1}	Seed
USA	Alex Michelsen	60	1
GBR	Dan Evans	62	2
FIN	Emil Ruusuvuori	67	3
~~AUS~~	~~Christopher O'Connell~~	~~68~~	~~4~~
USA	Mackenzie McDonald	74	5
USA	Brandon Nakashima	84	6
AUS	Aleksandar Vukic	89	7
CHN	Shang Juncheng	92	8

- ^{1} Rankings are as of 27 May 2024.

=== Other entrants ===
The following players received wildcards into the singles main draw:

- (United Kingdom) Dan Evans
- (United Kingdom) Arthur Fery
- (United Kingdom) Billy Harris

The following players received entry into the singles main draw as alternates:

- (Italy) Mattia Bellucci
- (United States) Maxime Cressy
- (Japan) Shintaro Mochizuki
- (Switzerland) Leandro Riedi
- (Japan) Sho Shimabukuro
- (Kazakhstan) Beibit Zhukayev

The following players received entry from the qualifying draw:

- (Australia) Alex Bolt
- (Netherlands) Gijs Brouwer
- (United Kingdom) Kyle Edmund
- (Switzerland) Marc-Andrea Hüsler
- (United Kingdom) Paul Jubb
- (Australia) Tristan Schoolkate

The following player received entry as a lucky loser:

- (Australia) Omar Jasika

== Women's singles main draw entrants ==
=== Seeds ===
Country	Player	Rank^{1}	Seed
CHN	Zhu Lin	54	1
GER	Tatjana Maria	65	2
SUI	Viktorija Golubic	76	3
BEL	Greet Minnen	85	4
GBR	Harriet Dart	90	5
GER	Jule Niemeier	97	6
USA	Emina Bektas	98	7
USA	Kayla Day	99	8

- ^{1} Rankings are as of 27 May 2024.

=== Other entrants ===
The following players received wildcards into the singles main draw:

- (United Kingdom) Katy Dunne
- (United Kingdom) Sarah Beth Grey
- (United Kingdom) Francesca Jones
- (United Kingdom) Sonay Kartal

The following player received entry using a protected ranking:

- (Belgium) Alison Van Uytvanck

The following players received entry from the qualifying draw:

- (United Kingdom) Emily Appleton
- (United Kingdom) Naiktha Bains
- (Australia) Kimberly Birrell
- (Australia) Olivia Gadecki
- (United States) Alana Smith
- (France) Harmony Tan
- (Australia) Ajla Tomljanović
- (Canada) Carol Zhao
