= 2026 Qatar ExxonMobil Open – Singles =

Singles
- 2026 Qatar ExxonMobil Open

Final
- Champion: (Spain) Carlos Alcaraz
- Runner-up: (France) Arthur Fils
- Score: 6–2, 6–1

Details
- Draw: 32 (4 Q / 3 WC )
- Seeds: 8

Events
Singles	Doubles
- ATP Qatar Open

Carlos Alcaraz defeated Arthur Fils in the final, 6–2, 6–1 to win the singles tennis title at the 2026 Qatar Open. It was his 26th ATP Tour level title.

Andrey Rublev was the defending champion but lost in the semifinals to Alcaraz.

== Seeds ==
1. (Spain) Carlos Alcaraz (champion)
2. (Italy) Jannik Sinner (quarterfinals)
3. (Kazakhstan) Alexander Bublik (withdrew)
4. Daniil Medvedev (second round)
5. Andrey Rublev (semifinals)
6. (Czech Republic) Jakub Menšík (semifinals)
7. Karen Khachanov (quarterfinals)
8. (Czech Republic) Jiří Lehečka (quarterfinals)

== Draw ==
Key

- Q = Qualifier
- WC = Wild card
- LL = Lucky loser
- Alt = Alternate
- ITF = ITF entry
- PR = Protected ranking
- SR = Special ranking
- SE = Special exempt
- JE = Junior exempt
- JR = Junior Accelerator Programme entrant
- CO = College Accelerator Programme entrant
- NG = Next Gen Accelerator Program entrant
- w/o = Walkover
- r = Retired
- d = Defaulted

=== Finals ===
Semifinals
1	(Spain) Carlos Alcaraz	7^{7}	6
5	Andrey Rublev	6^{3}	4
(France) Arthur Fils	6	7^{7}
6	(Czech Republic) Jakub Menšík	4	6^{4}

Final
1	(Spain) Carlos Alcaraz	6	6
(France) Arthur Fils	2	1

=== Top half ===
First round
1	(Spain) C Alcaraz	6	7^{7}
(France) A Rinderknech	4	6^{5}
(France) V Royer	6	6
Q	(France) P-H Herbert	0	3
(Hungary) M Fucsovics	6	6
WC	(Lebanon) H Habib	3	3
LL	(Japan) S Mochizuki	1	6	4
7	K Khachanov	6	3	6
4	D Medvedev	6	6
PR	(China) J Shang	4	2
WC	(Tunisia) M Echargui	4	4
(Greece) S Tsitsipas	6	6
(France) U Humbert	3	1
(Hungary) F Marozsán	6	6
(Netherlands) J de Jong	4	3
5	A Rublev	6	6

Second round
1	(Spain) C Alcaraz	6	7
(France) V Royer	2	5
(Hungary) M Fucsovics	2	6	4
7	K Khachanov	6	4	6
4	D Medvedev	3	4
(Greece) S Tsitsipas	6	6
(Hungary) F Marozsán	2	4
5	A Rublev	6	6

Quarterfinals
1	(Spain) C Alcaraz	6^{3}	6	6
7	K Khachanov	7^{7}	4	3
(Greece) S Tsitsipas	3	6^{2}
5	A Rublev	6	7^{7}

Semifinals
1	(Spain) C Alcaraz	7^{7}	6
5	A Rublev	6^{3}	4

=== Bottom half ===
First round
8	(Czech Republic) J Lehečka	6	6
(United States) J Brooksby	3	3
(Belgium) Z Bergs	6	6^{5}	6
(France) G Mpetshi Perricard	3	7^{7}	4
(France) A Fils	6^{5}	6	6
(Poland) K Majchrzak	7^{7}	3	4
Q	(Spain) P Carreño Busta	6	5	3
LL	(France) Q Halys	4	7	6
6	(Czech Republic) J Menšík	6^{6}	6	6
Q	(United Kingdom) J Choinski	7^{8}	2	4
PR	(China) Z Zhang	6	6
Q	(Spain) R Carballés Baena	4	4
WC	(Qatar) MS Zayid	0	2
(Australia) A Popyrin	6	6
(Czech Republic) T Macháč	1	4
2	(Italy) J Sinner	6	6

Second round
8	(Czech Republic) J Lehečka	6	6
(Belgium) Z Bergs	2	1
(France) A Fils	6	7^{9}
LL	(France) Q Halys	1	6^{7}
6	(Czech Republic) J Menšík	6	6
PR	(China) Z Zhang	3	2
(Australia) A Popyrin	3	5
2	(Italy) J Sinner	6	7

Quarterfinals
8	(Czech Republic) J Lehečka	3	3
(France) A Fils	6	6
6	(Czech Republic) J Menšík	7^{7}	2	6
2	(Italy) J Sinner	6^{3}	6	3

Semifinals
(France) A Fils	6	7^{7}
6	(Czech Republic) J Menšík	4	6^{4}

== Qualifying ==
=== Seeds ===
1. (France) Quentin Halys (qualifying competition, lucky loser)
2. (Australia) Aleksandar Vukic (first round)
3. (Spain) Pablo Carreño Busta (qualified)
4. (Japan) Shintaro Mochizuki (qualifying competition, lucky loser)
5. (Finland) Otto Virtanen (withdrew)
6. (Australia) Christopher O'Connell (withdrew)
7. (United Kingdom) Jan Choinski (qualified)
8. (United Kingdom) Billy Harris (qualifying competition)

=== Qualifiers ===
1. (United Kingdom) Jan Choinski
2. (France) Pierre-Hugues Herbert
3. (Spain) Pablo Carreño Busta
4. (Spain) Roberto Carballés Baena

=== Lucky losers ===
1. (France) Quentin Halys
2. (Japan) Shintaro Mochizuki

=== Qualifying draw ===
==== First qualifier ====
First round
1	(France) Quentin Halys	6	6
WC	(Turkey) Mert Alkaya	3	4
(Australia) James McCabe	4	4
7	(United Kingdom) Jan Choinski	6	6

Qualifying competition
1	(France) Quentin Halys	6	3	6^{5}
7	(United Kingdom) Jan Choinski	1	6	7^{7}

==== Second qualifier ====
First round
2	(Australia) Aleksandar Vukic	4	4
(France) Pierre-Hugues Herbert	6	6
(Georgia (country)) Nikoloz Basilashvili	3	5^{r}
Alt	(Sweden) Elias Ymer	6	6

Qualifying competition
(France) Pierre-Hugues Herbert	6	3	6
Alt	(Sweden) Elias Ymer	4	6	3

==== Third qualifier ====
First round
3	(Spain) Pablo Carreño Busta	6	6
WC	(Morocco) Reda Bennani	4	2
(Argentina) Marco Trungelliti	6	4	4
8	(United Kingdom) Billy Harris	3	6	6

Qualifying competition
3	(Spain) Pablo Carreño Busta	7	6
8	(United Kingdom) Billy Harris	5	3

==== Fourth qualifier ====
First round
4	(Japan) Shintaro Mochizuki	6	6
WC	(Qatar) Ghanim Al Sulaiti	0	1
(Spain) Roberto Carballés Baena	6	6
Alt	(Austria) Lucas Miedler	3	1

Qualifying competition
4	(Japan) Shintaro Mochizuki	0	3
(Spain) Roberto Carballés Baena	6	6
