= 2024 Delray Beach Open – Doubles =

Doubles
- 2024 Delray Beach Open

Final
- Champions: (United Kingdom) Julian Cash (United States) Robert Galloway
- Runners-up: (Mexico) Santiago González (United Kingdom) Neal Skupski
- Score: 5–7, 7–5, [10–2]

Events
Singles	Doubles
- Delray Beach Open

Julian Cash and Robert Galloway defeated Santiago González and Neal Skupski in the final, 5–7, 7–5, [10–2] to win the doubles tennis title at the 2024 Delray Beach Open. It was both players' first ATP Tour title.

Marcelo Arévalo and Jean-Julien Rojer were the two-time reigning champions, but they chose to compete with different partners in Rotterdam instead.

== Seeds ==
1. (Mexico) Santiago González / (United Kingdom) Neal Skupski (final)
2. (Monaco) Hugo Nys / (Poland) Jan Zieliński (semifinals)
3. (United Kingdom) Julian Cash / (United States) Robert Galloway (champions)
4. (Ecuador) Gonzalo Escobar / (Kazakhstan) Aleksandr Nedovyesov (first round)

== Draw ==
Key

- Q = Qualifier
- WC = Wild card
- LL = Lucky loser
- Alt = Alternate
- ITF = ITF entry
- PR = Protected ranking
- SR = Special ranking
- SE = Special exempt
- JE = Junior exempt
- JR = Junior Accelerator Programme entrant
- CO = College Accelerator Programme entrant
- NG = Next Gen Accelerator Program entrant
- w/o = Walkover
- r = Retired
- d = Defaulted

=== Draw ===
First round
1	(Mexico) S González (United Kingdom) N Skupski	6	6
Alt	(United Kingdom) L Broady (Mexico) H Hach Verdugo	2	3
WC	(United States) W Blumberg (Australia) R Hijikata	6	6
(Portugal) F Cabral (United Kingdom) H Patten	4	2
4	(Ecuador) G Escobar (Kazakhstan) A Nedovyesov	6^{5}	6^{5}
(Australia) A Harris (Germany) D Koepfer	7^{7}	7^{7}
(Ecuador) D Hidalgo (Colombia) C Rodríguez	6	6
WC	(United States) N Godsick (United States) E Quinn	4	2
(Sweden) A Göransson (Venezuela) LD Martínez	2	6	[13]
(United States) E King (United States) R Stalder	6	3	[11]
(Australia) M Purcell (Australia) J Thompson	3	4
3	(United Kingdom) J Cash (United States) R Galloway	6	6
(India) A Chandrasekar (India) VS Prashanth	3	6^{5}
(Argentina) G Andreozzi (Mexico) MÁ Reyes-Varela	6	7^{7}
Alt	(Moldova) R Albot (France) C Lestienne	3	2
2	(Monaco) H Nys (Poland) J Zieliński	6	6

Quarterfinals
1	(Mexico) S González (United Kingdom) N Skupski	5	7	[10]
WC	(United States) W Blumberg (Australia) R Hijikata	7	5	[7]
(Australia) A Harris (Germany) D Koepfer	6^{2}	6^{4}
(Ecuador) D Hidalgo (Colombia) C Rodríguez	7^{7}	7^{7}
(Sweden) A Göransson (Venezuela) LD Martínez	5	4
3	(United Kingdom) J Cash (United States) R Galloway	7	6
(Argentina) G Andreozzi (Mexico) MÁ Reyes-Varela	2	2
2	(Monaco) H Nys (Poland) J Zieliński	6	6

Semifinals
1	(Mexico) S González (United Kingdom) N Skupski	7^{11}	7^{7}
(Ecuador) D Hidalgo (Colombia) C Rodríguez	6^{9}	6^{5}
3	(United Kingdom) J Cash (United States) R Galloway	6	7
2	(Monaco) H Nys (Poland) J Zieliński	4	5

Final
1	(Mexico) S González (United Kingdom) N Skupski	7	5	[2]
3	(United Kingdom) J Cash (United States) R Galloway	5	7	[10]
