= 2022 Internazionali di Tennis Castel del Monte =

- Date: 21 – 27 November
- Edition: 7th
- Surface: Hard (indoor)
- Location: Andria, Italy

Champions

Singles
- (Switzerland) Leandro Riedi

Doubles
- (United Kingdom) Julian Cash / (United Kingdom) Henry Patten
- Internazionali di Tennis Castel del Monte

The 2022 Internazionali di Tennis Castel del Monte was a professional tennis tournament played on indoor hard courts. It was the seventh edition of the tournament which was part of the 2022 ATP Challenger Tour. It took place in Andria, Italy between 21 and 27 November 2022.

== Singles main-draw entrants ==
=== Seeds ===
Country	Player	Rank^{1}	Seed
HUN	Márton Fucsovics	97	1
FRA	Hugo Gaston	106	2
CZE	Tomáš Macháč	112	3
~~USA~~	~~Michael Mmoh~~	~~118~~	~~4~~
AUT	Jurij Rodionov	122	5
SWE	Elias Ymer	128	6
NED	Jelle Sels	133	7
BEL	Zizou Bergs	135	8

- ^{1} Rankings are as of 14 November 2022.

=== Other entrants ===
The following players received wildcards into the singles main draw:

- (Italy) Federico Arnaboldi
- (Italy) Gianmarco Ferrari
- (Italy) Stefano Travaglia

The following players received entry from the qualifying draw:

- (France) Mathys Erhard
- (France) Arthur Fils
- Alibek Kachmazov
- (Ukraine) Illya Marchenko
- (United Kingdom) Stuart Parker
- (Czech Republic) Andrew Paulson

The following players received entry as lucky losers:

- Evgeny Karlovskiy
- (Czech Republic) David Poljak

== Champions ==
=== Singles ===
- (Switzerland) Leandro Riedi def. (Kazakhstan) Mikhail Kukushkin 7–6^{(7–4)}, 6–3.

=== Doubles ===
- (United Kingdom) Julian Cash / (United Kingdom) Henry Patten def. (Italy) Francesco Forti / (Italy) Marcello Serafini 6–7^{(3–7)}, 6–4, [10–4].
