= 2026 Mubadala DC Open – Women's doubles =

Women's doubles
- 2026 Mubadala DC Open

Final
- Champions: (New Zealand) Erin Routliffe (Indonesia) Aldila Sutjiadi
- Runners-up: (Slovenia) Andreja Klepač (Japan) Makoto Ninomiya
- Score: 6–4, 6–1
- Date: 1st Aug 2026

Details
- Draw: 16
- Seeds: 4

Events
Singles	men	women
Doubles	men	women
- Washington Open

Erin Routliffe and Aldila Sutjiadi defeated Andreja Klepač and Makoto Ninomiya in the final, 6–4, 6–1 to win the women's doubles tennis title at the 2026 Washington Open.

Taylor Townsend and Zhang Shuai were the reigning champions, but Townsend did not participate this year. Zhang partnered Janice Tjen, but lost in the semifinals to Klepač and Ninomiya.

== Seeds ==
1. (Italy) Sara Errani / (United States) Nicole Melichar-Martinez (quarterfinals)
2. (New Zealand) Erin Routliffe / (Indonesia) Aldila Sutjiadi (champions)
3. (Indonesia) Janice Tjen / (China) Zhang Shuai (semifinals)
4. (Kazakhstan) Anna Danilina / (Canada) Leylah Fernandez (first round)

== Draw ==
Key

- Q = Qualifier
- WC = Wild card
- LL = Lucky loser
- Alt = Alternate
- ITF = ITF entry
- PR = Protected ranking
- SR = Special ranking
- SE = Special exempt
- JE = Junior exempt
- JR = Junior Accelerator Programme entrant
- CO = College Accelerator Programme entrant
- NG = Next Gen Accelerator Program entrant
- w/o = Walkover
- r = Retired
- d = Defaulted

=== Draw ===
First round
1	(Italy) S Errani (United States) N Melichar-Martinez	6	6
(United Kingdom) K Boulter; P Iatcenko	1	0
(United States) C Ansari (United States) L Ma	3	7^{8}	[6]
(Slovenia) A Klepač (Japan) M Ninomiya	6	6^{6}	[10]
3	(Indonesia) J Tjen (China) S Zhang	6	6
(Uzbekistan) K Rakhimova (Chinese Taipei) F-h Wu	3	4
(Japan) M Kato (Mexico) G Olmos	1	6	[11]
(Slovakia) T Mihalíková (United Kingdom) H Watson	6	1	[9]
WC	D Shnaider (United States) V Williams	6	6
(Norway) U Eikeri (United States) Q Gleason	3	4
(China) Q Tang (China) Y Xu	6	6
4	(Kazakhstan) A Danilina (Canada) L Fernandez	2	4
(United States) C Ngounoue (United States) A Smith	6	4	[10]
(United States) A Li (Denmark) C Tauson	2	6	[3]
(United States) S Kenin (Austria) A Potapova	3	5
2	(New Zealand) E Routliffe (Indonesia) A Sutjiadi	6	7

Quarterfinals
1	(Italy) S Errani (United States) N Melichar-Martinez	6	6^{3}	[10]
(Slovenia) A Klepač (Japan) M Ninomiya	1	7^{7}	[12]
3	(Indonesia) J Tjen (China) S Zhang	4	6	[10]
(Japan) M Kato (Mexico) G Olmos	6	2	[0]
WC	D Shnaider (United States) V Williams	4	2
(China) Q Tang (China) Y Xu	6	6
(United States) C Ngounoue (United States) A Smith	3	2
2	(New Zealand) E Routliffe (Indonesia) A Sutjiadi	6	6

Semifinals
(Slovenia) A Klepač (Japan) M Ninomiya	6	5	[10]
3	(Indonesia) J Tjen (China) S Zhang	4	7	[7]
(China) Q Tang (China) Y Xu	1	1
2	(New Zealand) E Routliffe (Indonesia) A Sutjiadi	6	6

Final
(Slovenia) A Klepač (Japan) M Ninomiya	4	1
2	(New Zealand) E Routliffe (Indonesia) A Sutjiadi	6	6
