= 2026 Mubadala DC Open – Men's singles =

Men's singles
- 2026 Mubadala DC Open

Final
- Champion: (United States) Taylor Fritz
- Runner-up: (Spain) Rafael Jódar
- Score: 7–6^{(7–2)}, 6–4
- Date: 3rd August 2026

Details
- Draw: 32 (6Q / 4WC)
- Seeds: 8

Events
Singles	men	women
Doubles	men	women
- Washington Open

Taylor Fritz defeated Rafael Jódar in the final, 7–6^{(7–2)}, 6–4 to win the men's singles tennis title at the 2026 Washington Open. He saved a match point (against Alex Michelsen in the quarterfinals) en route his eleventh ATP Tour singles title. Fritz was the second American man to win Washington since it became an ATP 500 event in 2009, after Sebastian Korda in 2024.

Alex de Minaur was the defending champion, but lost in the quarterfinals to Brandon Nakashima.

Cruz Hewitt was the youngest player to win a main-draw match at the tournament since Kei Nishikori in 2007.

== Seeds ==
1. (Australia) Alex de Minaur (quarterfinals)
2. (United States) Ben Shelton (quarterfinals)
3. (United States) Taylor Fritz (champion)
4. (Italy) Lorenzo Musetti (quarterfinals)
5. (United States) Learner Tien (first round)
6. (United States) Frances Tiafoe (first round)
7. (Czech Republic) Jakub Menšík (second round)
8. (France) Arthur Fils (first round)

== Draw ==
Key

- Q = Qualifier
- WC = Wild card
- LL = Lucky loser
- Alt = Alternate
- ITF = ITF entry
- PR = Protected ranking
- SR = Special ranking
- SE = Special exempt
- JE = Junior exempt
- JR = Junior Accelerator Programme entrant
- CO = College Accelerator Programme entrant
- NG = Next Gen Accelerator Program entrant
- w/o = Walkover
- r = Retired
- d = Defaulted

=== Finals ===
Semifinals
(United States) Brandon Nakashima	3	6	3
3	(United States) Taylor Fritz	6	3	6
(Spain) Rafael Jódar	6^{6}	6	6
(Chile) Alejandro Tabilo	7^{8}	4	4

Final
3	(United States) Taylor Fritz	7^{7}	6
(Spain) Rafael Jódar	6^{2}	4

=== Top half ===
First round
1	(Australia) A de Minaur	6	3	6
WC	(Greece) S Tsitsipas	4	6	3
Q	(United States) M Giron	3	4
Q	(Australia) C Hewitt	6	6
(United States) B Nakashima	6	6
(Argentina) TM Etcheverry	3	4
Q	(United States) T Svajda	2	7^{7}	3
7	(Czech Republic) J Menšík	6	6^{5}	6
3	(United States) T Fritz	6	6
(Belgium) Z Bergs	3	4
(Poland) K Majchrzak	7	7^{7}
(United States) T Paul	5	6^{4}
(United States) A Michelsen	6	7
LL	(United States) M McDonald	4	5
(France) A Mannarino	7	6
5	(United States) L Tien	5	4

Second round
1	(Australia) A de Minaur	6	6
Q	(Australia) C Hewitt	2	3
(United States) B Nakashima	7^{7}	3	6
7	(Czech Republic) J Menšík	6^{5}	6	4
3	(United States) T Fritz	6	6
(Poland) K Majchrzak	3	4
(United States) A Michelsen	6	7^{7}
(France) A Mannarino	4	6^{3}

Quarterfinals
1	(Australia) A de Minaur	6^{5}	4
(United States) B Nakashima	7^{7}	6
3	(United States) T Fritz	6	3	7^{8}
(United States) A Michelsen	1	6	6^{6}

Semifinals
(United States) B Nakashima	3	6	3
3	(United States) T Fritz	6	3	6

=== Bottom half ===
First round
8	(France) A Fils	6^{5}	3
(Spain) R Jódar	7^{7}	6
WC	(Japan) K Nishikori	6^{3}	6	6
PR	(China) J Shang	7^{7}	3	4
Q	(Australia) A Vukic	6	6
LL	(United States) Z Svajda	3	1
(Italy) M Arnaldi	0	1^{r}
4	(Italy) L Musetti	6	3
6	(United States) F Tiafoe	6	3	4
(France) T Atmane	4	6	6
(Chile) A Tabilo	7^{7}	4	6
(Netherlands) T Griekspoor	6^{3}	6	4
(France) U Humbert	6	7
Q	(United States) A Martin	2	5
Q	(United States) M Damm	4	6	4
2/WC	(United States) B Shelton	6	4	6

Second round
(Spain) R Jódar	6	6
WC	(Japan) K Nishikori	3	2
Q	(Australia) A Vukic	3	7	3
4	(Italy) L Musetti	6	5	6
(France) T Atmane	3	6^{6}
(Chile) A Tabilo	6	7^{8}
(France) U Humbert	7^{7}	3	4
2/WC	(United States) B Shelton	6^{3}	6	6

Quarterfinals
(Spain) R Jódar	1	6	6
4	(Italy) L Musetti	6	1	4
(Chile) A Tabilo	4	7	6
2/WC	(United States) B Shelton	6	5	4

Semifinals
(Spain) R Jódar	6^{6}	6	6
(Chile) A Tabilo	7^{8}	4	4

== Qualifying ==
=== Seeds ===
1. (United States) Zachary Svajda (qualifying competition, retired, lucky loser)
2. (United States) Marcos Giron (qualified)
3. (Australia) Aleksandar Vukic (qualified)
4. (United States) Martin Damm (qualified)
5. (Australia) Christopher O'Connell (first round)
6. (United States) Mackenzie McDonald (qualifying competition, lucky loser)
7. (Tunisia) Moez Echargui (qualifying competition)
8. (Serbia) Dušan Lajović (first round, retired)
9. (United Kingdom) Billy Harris (first round)
10. (Australia) Alex Bolt (qualifying competition)
11. (Switzerland) Rémy Bertola (first round)
12. (Sweden) Elias Ymer (first round)

=== Qualifiers ===
1. (Australia) Cruz Hewitt
2. (United States) Marcos Giron
3. (Australia) Aleksandar Vukic
4. (United States) Martin Damm
5. (United States) Andres Martin
6. (United States) Trevor Svajda

=== Lucky losers ===
1. (United States) Zachary Svajda
2. (United States) Mackenzie McDonald

=== Qualifying draw ===
==== First qualifier ====
First round
1	(United States) Zachary Svajda	7	6
Alt	(United States) Stefan Kozlov	5	1
WC	(Australia) Cruz Hewitt	5
8	(Serbia) Dušan Lajović	2^{r}

Qualifying competition
1	(United States) Zachary Svajda	6	6^{3}	0^{r}
WC	(Australia) Cruz Hewitt	1	7^{7}	2

==== Second qualifier ====
First round
2	(United States) Marcos Giron	7	6
WC	(India) Aryan Shah	5	4
(United States) Andre Ilagan	7	7^{7}
11	(Switzerland) Rémy Bertola	5	6^{2}

Qualifying competition
2	(United States) Marcos Giron	6	7^{7}
(United States) Andre Ilagan	3	6^{2}

==== Third qualifier ====
First round
3	(Australia) Aleksandar Vukic	6	6
PR	(Tunisia) Aziz Dougaz	3	3
(Australia) James McCabe	6^{6}	6^{2}
10	(Australia) Alex Bolt	7^{8}	7^{7}

Qualifying competition
3	(Australia) Aleksandar Vukic	6	6
10	(Australia) Alex Bolt	0	1

==== Fourth qualifier ====
First round
4	(United States) Martin Damm	6	6
(Belgium) Kimmer Coppejans	2	0
(Jordan) Abdullah Shelbayh	6	7^{7}
9	(United Kingdom) Billy Harris	4	6^{2}

Qualifying competition
4	(United States) Martin Damm	4	7	7^{7}
(Jordan) Abdullah Shelbayh	6	5	6^{4}

==== Fifth qualifier ====
First round
5	(Australia) Christopher O'Connell	3	6	2
(United States) Andres Martin	6	4	6
WC	(United States) Jordan Lee	5	1
7	(Tunisia) Moez Echargui	7	6

Qualifying competition
(United States) Andres Martin	6	7
7	(Tunisia) Moez Echargui	2	5

==== Sixth qualifier ====
First round
6	(United States) Mackenzie McDonald	3	6	6
(Lithuania) Edas Butvilas	6	3	4
WC	(United States) Trevor Svajda	6	7^{7}
12	(Sweden) Elias Ymer	0	6^{5}

Qualifying competition
6	(United States) Mackenzie McDonald	4	4
WC	(United States) Trevor Svajda	6	6
