= 2026 Mubadala DC Open – Women's singles =

Women's singles
- 2026 Mubadala DC Open

Final
- Champion: (Philippines) Alexandra Eala
- Runner-up: (United States) Jessica Pegula
- Score: 4−6, 6−4, 6−0
- Date: 3 August 2026

Details
- Draw: 28 (4Q / 4WC)
- Seeds: 8

Events
Singles	men	women
Doubles	men	women
- Washington Open

Alexandra Eala defeated Jessica Pegula in the final, 4–6, 6–4, 6–0 to win the women's singles tennis title at the 2026 Washington Open. It was her first WTA Tour title, becoming the first Filipino to win a tour-level singles title. Eala was also the first Southeast Asian player to win a singles title at the WTA 500 level or higher.

Leylah Fernandez was the defending champion, but lost in the second round to Eala.

== Seeds ==
The top four seeds received a bye into the second round.

1. (United States) Jessica Pegula (final)
2. (Ukraine) Elina Svitolina (quarterfinals)
3. (Japan) Naomi Osaka (semifinals)
4. Diana Shnaider (semifinals)
5. Anna Kalinskaya (quarterfinals)
6. (United States) Madison Keys (first round)
7. (Canada) Leylah Fernandez (second round)
8. (United States) Emma Navarro (second round)

== Draw ==
Key

- Q = Qualifier
- WC = Wild card
- LL = Lucky loser
- Alt = Alternate
- ITF = ITF entry
- PR = Protected ranking
- SR = Special ranking
- SE = Special exempt
- JE = Junior exempt
- JR = Junior Accelerator Programme entrant
- CO = College Accelerator Programme entrant
- NG = Next Gen Accelerator Program entrant
- w/o = Walkover
- r = Retired
- d = Defaulted

=== Finals ===
Semifinals
1	(United States) Jessica Pegula	7	6
4	Diana Shnaider	5	4
3	(Japan) Naomi Osaka	4	2
(Philippines) Alexandra Eala	6	6

Final
1	(United States) Jessica Pegula	6	4	0
(Philippines) Alexandra Eala	4	6	6

=== Top half ===
First round
(Poland) M Fręch	6	6
(United States) A Li	4	3
(Indonesia) J Tjen	6	6
Q	(Slovakia) R Šramková	4	2
Q	(Australia) D Kasatkina	4	1
5	A Kalinskaya	6	6
(Austria) A Potapova	6	6
WC	(United States) V Williams	3	3
Q	(United States) J Pareja	6^{3}	3
(China) Xin Wang	7^{7}	6
L Samsonova	3	6	6
6	(United States) M Keys	6	4	4

Second round
1	(United States) J Pegula	3	6	6
(Poland) M Fręch	6	3	0
(Indonesia) J Tjen	6	3	6^{7}
5	A Kalinskaya	1	6	7^{9}
4	D Shnaider	6	6
(Austria) A Potapova	1	2
(China) Xin Wang	2	2
L Samsonova	6	6

Quarterfinals
1	(United States) J Pegula	6	7
5	A Kalinskaya	3	5
4	D Shnaider	6	6
L Samsonova	3	4

Semifinals
1	(United States) J Pegula	7	6
4	D Shnaider	5	4

=== Bottom half ===
First round
8	(United States) E Navarro	6	7
WC	(United States) S Kenin	0	5
(Italy) E Cocciaretto	4	7^{7}	7^{7}
(Denmark) C Tauson	6	6^{2}	6^{2}
WC	(United States) A Krueger	3	6	6
(United Kingdom) K Boulter	6	2	2
7	(Canada) L Fernandez	6	6
(Poland) M Linette	1	4
(Philippines) A Eala	4	6	6
WC	(China) Q Zheng	6	4	1
(Spain) C Bucșa	7	6^{4}	0
Q	(Uzbekistan) P Kudermetova	5	7^{7}	6

Second round
8	(United States) E Navarro	3	6	3
(Italy) E Cocciaretto	6	4	6
WC	(United States) A Krueger	3	1^{r}
3	(Japan) N Osaka	6	3
7	(Canada) L Fernandez	2	6^{1}
(Philippines) A Eala	6	7^{7}
Q	(Uzbekistan) P Kudermetova	6^{4}	4
2	(Ukraine) E Svitolina	7^{7}	6

Quarterfinals
(Italy) E Cocciaretto	6	4	3
3	(Japan) N Osaka	4	6	6
(Philippines) A Eala	6	6
2	(Ukraine) E Svitolina	3	4

Semifinals
3	(Japan) N Osaka	4	2
(Philippines) A Eala	6	6

== Qualifying ==
=== Seeds ===
1. (China) Zhang Shuai (first round)
2. (Australia) Daria Kasatkina (qualified)
3. (Uzbekistan) Kamilla Rakhimova (first round)
4. (Uzbekistan) Polina Kudermetova (qualified)
5. (Slovakia) Rebecca Šramková (qualified)
6. Polina Iatcenko (first round)
7. (United States) Varvara Lepchenko (qualifying competition)
8. (United Kingdom) Katie Swan (withdrew)

=== Qualifiers ===
1. (Slovakia) Rebecca Šramková
2. (Australia) Daria Kasatkina
3. (United States) Julieta Pareja
4. (Uzbekistan) Polina Kudermetova

=== Qualifying draw ===
==== First qualifier ====
First round
1	(China) Zhang Shuai	4	6	1
(Czech Republic) Gabriela Knutson	6	1	6
(United States) Carolyn Ansari	4	2
5	(Slovakia) Rebecca Šramková	6	6

Qualifying competition
(Czech Republic) Gabriela Knutson	3	2
5	(Slovakia) Rebecca Šramková	6	6

==== Second qualifier ====
First round
2	(Australia) Daria Kasatkina	6^{3}	6	6
PR	(Georgia (country)) Mariam Bolkvadze	7^{7}	4	0
(United States) Lea Ma	4	6^{5}
Alt	(United States) Alana Smith	6	7^{7}

Qualifying competition
2	(Australia) Daria Kasatkina	4	6	6
Alt	(United States) Alana Smith	6	4	0

==== Third qualifier ====
First round
3	(Uzbekistan) Kamilla Rakhimova	6^{2}	6^{5}
PR	(United Kingdom) Heather Watson	7^{7}	7^{7}
WC	(United States) Julieta Pareja	6	6
6	Polina Iatcenko	4	2

Qualifying competition
PR	(United Kingdom) Heather Watson	4	6	5
WC	(United States) Julieta Pareja	6	3	7

==== Fourth qualifier ====
First round
4	(Uzbekistan) Polina Kudermetova	7^{8}	6
(Japan) Mei Yamaguchi	6^{6}	4
WC	(United States) Clervie Ngounoue	1	6	4
7	(United States) Varvara Lepchenko	6	4	6

Qualifying competition
4	(Uzbekistan) Polina Kudermetova	4	7^{9}	6
7	(United States) Varvara Lepchenko	6	6^{7}	4
