= 2024 Surbiton Trophy – Women's doubles =

Women's doubles
- 2024 Surbiton Trophy

Final
- Champions: (United States) Emina Bektas (Serbia) Aleksandra Krunić
- Runners-up: (United Kingdom) Sarah Beth Grey (United Kingdom) Tara Moore
- Score: 6–1, 6–1

Events
Singles	men	women
Doubles	men	women
← 2023 ·	Surbiton Trophy	· 2025 →

Sophie Chang and Yanina Wickmayer were the reigning champions, but chose not to participate this year.

Emina Bektas and Aleksandra Krunić won the title, defeating Sarah Beth Grey and Tara Moore in the final, 6–1, 6–1.

== Seeds ==
1. (United Kingdom) Naiktha Bains / (United Kingdom) Maia Lumsden (first round)
2. (Brazil) Ingrid Martins / (China) Zhu Lin (first round)
3. (United Kingdom) Harriet Dart / (Belgium) Greet Minnen (semifinals)
4. (France) Jessika Ponchet / (Netherlands) Bibiane Schoofs (first round)

== Draw ==
Key

- Q = Qualifier
- WC = Wild card
- LL = Lucky loser
- Alt = Alternate
- ITF = ITF entry
- PR = Protected ranking
- SR = Special ranking
- SE = Special exempt
- JE = Junior exempt
- JR = Junior Accelerator Programme entrant
- CO = College Accelerator Programme entrant
- NG = Next Gen Accelerator Program entrant
- w/o = Walkover
- r = Retired
- d = Defaulted

=== Draw ===
First round
1	(United Kingdom) N Bains (United Kingdom) M Lumsden	5	2
(United Kingdom) E Appleton (United Kingdom) L Miyazaki	7	6
WC	(United Kingdom) L John-Baptiste (United Kingdom) R Stoiber	6^{1}	1
(United States) E Bektas (Serbia) A Krunić	7^{7}	6
3	(United Kingdom) H Dart (Belgium) G Minnen	6	6
(United Kingdom) A Barnett (United Kingdom) F Christie	3	3
WC	(United Kingdom) M Brooks (United Kingdom) A Rajecki	6^{4}	1
(United Kingdom) S Murray Sharan (United Kingdom) E Silva	7^{7}	6
(United States) C Corley (United States) I Corley	3	6^{7}
(Australia) D Aiava (United States) A Smith	6	7^{9}
WC	(United Kingdom) SB Grey (United Kingdom) T Moore	6	5	[10]
4	(France) J Ponchet (Netherlands) B Schoofs	3	7	[7]
(Australia) K Birrell (Sweden) M Björklund	3	2
(Switzerland) V Golubic (Switzerland) C Naef	6	6
(United States) E Mandlik (Canada) R Marino	6	4	[10]
2	(Brazil) I Martins (China) L Zhu	3	6	[5]

Quarterfinals
(United Kingdom) E Appleton (United Kingdom) L Miyazaki	6^{6}	4
(United States) E Bektas (Serbia) A Krunić	7^{8}	6
3	(United Kingdom) H Dart (Belgium) G Minnen	6	6
(United Kingdom) S Murray Sharan (United Kingdom) E Silva	3	3
(Australia) D Aiava (United States) A Smith	4	5
WC	(United Kingdom) SB Grey (United Kingdom) T Moore	6	7
(Switzerland) V Golubic (Switzerland) C Naef	6	6
(United States) E Mandlik (Canada) R Marino	2	3

Semifinals
(United States) E Bektas (Serbia) A Krunić	6	6
3	(United Kingdom) H Dart (Belgium) G Minnen	1	3
WC	(United Kingdom) SB Grey (United Kingdom) T Moore	7^{7}	2	[13]
(Switzerland) V Golubic (Switzerland) C Naef	6^{5}	6	[11]

Final
(United States) E Bektas (Serbia) A Krunić	6	6
WC	(United Kingdom) SB Grey (United Kingdom) T Moore	1	1
