= 2022 Internazionali di Tennis Castel del Monte – Doubles =

Doubles
- 2022 Internazionali di Tennis Castel del Monte

Final
- Champions: (United Kingdom) Julian Cash (United Kingdom) Henry Patten
- Runners-up: (Italy) Francesco Forti (Italy) Marcello Serafini
- Score: 6–7^{(3–7)}, 6–4, [10–4]

Events
Singles	Doubles
- Internazionali di Tennis Castel del Monte

Karol Drzewiecki and Szymon Walków were the defending champions but only Walków chose to defend his title, partnering Łukasz Kubot. Walków lost in the semifinals to Julian Cash and Henry Patten.

Cash and Patten won the title after defeating Francesco Forti and Marcello Serafini 6–7^{(3–7)}, 6–4, [10–4] in the final, setting a record for Challenger doubles titles in a calendar year with nine.

== Seeds ==
1. (United Kingdom) Julian Cash / (United Kingdom) Henry Patten (champions)
2. (Netherlands) Robin Haase / (Netherlands) Sem Verbeek (quarterfinals)
3. (Monaco) Romain Arneodo / (Austria) Tristan-Samuel Weissborn (first round)
4. (Germany) Fabian Fallert / (Germany) Hendrik Jebens (quarterfinals)

== Draw ==
Key

- Q = Qualifier
- WC = Wild card
- LL = Lucky loser
- Alt = Alternate
- ITF = ITF entry
- PR = Protected ranking
- SR = Special ranking
- SE = Special exempt
- JE = Junior exempt
- JR = Junior Accelerator Programme entrant
- CO = College Accelerator Programme entrant
- NG = Next Gen Accelerator Program entrant
- w/o = Walkover
- r = Retired
- d = Defaulted

First round
1	(United Kingdom) J Cash (United Kingdom) H Patten	6	6
Alt	(Bulgaria) A Lazarov (Bulgaria) R Shandarov	3	1
WC	(Italy) F Arnaboldi (Italy) G Ferrari	7^{7}	6
(Canada) K Stevenson (Ukraine) Eric Vanshelboim	6^{1}	4
4	(Germany) F Fallert (Germany) H Jebens	3	6	[13]
(United Kingdom) S Parker (United Kingdom) R Peniston	6	4	[11]
(Turkey) K Kırcı (Kazakhstan) D Yevseyev	6^{4}	4
(Poland) Ł Kubot (Poland) S Walków	7^{7}	6
(Czech Republic) D Poljak (Czech Republic) D Svrčina	0	3
(Latvia) M Lībietis (Switzerland) L Margaroli	6	6
(Sweden) F Bergevi (Germany) Niklas Schell	6	2	[10]
3	(Monaco) R Arneodo (Austria) T-S Weissborn	1	6	[6]
WC	(Italy) F Forti (Italy) Marcello Serafini	6	7^{9}
Kirill Kivattsev (Italy) Augusto Virgili	4	6^{7}
(Uzbekistan) D Istomin; E Karlovskiy	3	6	[7]
2	(Netherlands) R Haase (Netherlands) S Verbeek	6	3	[10]

Quarterfinals
1	(United Kingdom) J Cash (United Kingdom) H Patten	6	6
WC	(Italy) F Arnaboldi (Italy) G Ferrari	1	3
4	(Germany) F Fallert (Germany) H Jebens	6	5	[8]
(Poland) Ł Kubot (Poland) S Walków	2	7	[10]
(Latvia) M Lībietis (Switzerland) L Margaroli	7^{7}	3	[5]
(Sweden) F Bergevi (Germany) N Schell	6^{5}	6	[10]
WC	(Italy) F Forti (Italy) M Serafini	6^{4}	7^{7}	[10]
2	(Netherlands) R Haase (Netherlands) S Verbeek	7^{7}	6^{5}	[7]

Semifinals
1	(United Kingdom) J Cash (United Kingdom) H Patten	6	7^{7}
(Poland) Ł Kubot (Poland) S Walków	3	6^{3}
(Sweden) F Bergevi (Germany) N Schell	6^{9}	2
WC	(Italy) F Forti (Italy) M Serafini	7^{11}	6

Final
1	(United Kingdom) J Cash (United Kingdom) H Patten	6^{3}	6	[10]
WC	(Italy) F Forti (Italy) M Serafini	7^{7}	4	[4]
