= 2022 Internazionali di Tennis Castel del Monte – Singles =

Singles
- 2022 Internazionali di Tennis Castel del Monte

Final
- Champion: (Switzerland) Leandro Riedi
- Runner-up: (Kazakhstan) Mikhail Kukushkin
- Score: 7–6^{(7–4)}, 6–3

Events
Singles	Doubles
- Internazionali di Tennis Castel del Monte

Ugo Humbert was the defending champion but chose not to defend his title.

Leandro Riedi won the title after defeating Mikhail Kukushkin 7–6^{(7–4)}, 6–3 in the final.

== Seeds ==
1. (Hungary) Márton Fucsovics (semifinals)
2. (France) Hugo Gaston (first round)
3. (Czech Republic) Tomáš Macháč (quarterfinals)
4. (United States) Michael Mmoh (withdrew)
5. (Austria) Jurij Rodionov (quarterfinals)
6. (Sweden) Elias Ymer (first round)
7. (Netherlands) Jelle Sels (second round, retired)
8. (Belgium) Zizou Bergs (second round)

== Draw ==
Key

- Q = Qualifier
- WC = Wild card
- LL = Lucky loser
- Alt = Alternate
- ITF = ITF entry
- PR = Protected ranking
- SR = Special ranking
- SE = Special exempt
- JE = Junior exempt
- JR = Junior Accelerator Programme entrant
- CO = College Accelerator Programme entrant
- NG = Next Gen Accelerator Program entrant
- w/o = Walkover
- r = Retired
- d = Defaulted

=== Finals ===
Semifinals
1	(Hungary) Márton Fucsovics	4	4
(Kazakhstan) Mikhail Kukushkin	6	6
(Ukraine) Vitaliy Sachko	4	3
(Switzerland) Leandro Riedi	6	6

Final
(Kazakhstan) Mikhail Kukushkin	6^{4}	3
(Switzerland) Leandro Riedi	7^{7}	6

=== Top half ===
First round
1	(Hungary) M Fucsovics	6	7^{7}
Q	(France) A Fils	4	6^{5}
(United Kingdom) R Peniston	6	6
(United Kingdom) J Clarke	2	1
Q	(France) Mathys Erhard	3	2
Q	(Czech Republic) A Paulson	6	6
WC	(Italy) S Travaglia	7	7^{7}
6	(Sweden) E Ymer	5	6^{5}
Q	(United Kingdom) S Parker	6	3	6^{4}
(Belgium) M Geerts	1	6	7^{7}
(Kazakhstan) M Kukushkin	6	6
LL	(Czech Republic) D Poljak	4	4
Q	A Kachmazov	6	6
Q	(Ukraine) I Marchenko	2	1
WC	(Italy) F Arnaboldi	2	4
5	(Austria) J Rodionov	6	6

Second round
1	(Hungary) M Fucsovics	7^{7}	6^{5}	6
(United Kingdom) R Peniston	6^{3}	7^{7}	3
Q	(Czech Republic) A Paulson	3	6^{6}
WC	(Italy) S Travaglia	6	7^{8}
(Belgium) M Geerts	1	3
(Kazakhstan) M Kukushkin	6	6
Q	A Kachmazov	4	7^{7}	4
5	(Austria) J Rodionov	6	6^{4}	6

Quarterfinals
1	(Hungary) M Fucsovics	4	6	7
WC	(Italy) S Travaglia	6	4	5
(Kazakhstan) M Kukushkin	6	7
5	(Austria) J Rodionov	0	5

Semifinals
1	(Hungary) M Fucsovics	4	4
(Kazakhstan) M Kukushkin	6	6

=== Bottom half ===
First round
7	(Netherlands) J Sels	6	6
A Vatutin	1	3
(Bulgaria) A Lazarov	6	3	2
(Ukraine) V Sachko	3	6	6
(Italy) M Bellucci	6	6^{9}	2^{r}
(Czech Republic) D Svrčina	4	7^{11}	4
(Italy) F Cobolli	6^{3}	2
3	(Czech Republic) T Macháč	7^{7}	6
8	(Belgium) Z Bergs	6	3	6
WC	(Italy) G Ferrari	3	6	2
(Australia) A Vukic	3	7^{8}	4
LL	E Karlovskiy	6	6^{6}	6
(Poland) K Żuk	2	4
(Netherlands) R Haase	6	6
(Switzerland) L Riedi	7^{7}	7^{7}
2	(France) H Gaston	6^{2}	6^{4}

Second round
7	(Netherlands) J Sels	1^{r}
(Ukraine) V Sachko	2
(Czech Republic) D Svrčina
3	(Czech Republic) T Macháč	w/o
8	(Belgium) Z Bergs	2	5
LL	E Karlovskiy	6	7
(Netherlands) R Haase	5	1
(Switzerland) L Riedi	7	6

Quarterfinals
(Ukraine) V Sachko	7	6
3	(Czech Republic) T Macháč	5	2
LL	E Karlovskiy	3	1
(Switzerland) L Riedi	6	6

Semifinals
(Ukraine) V Sachko	4	3
(Switzerland) L Riedi	6	6
