= 2023 Sofia Open – Singles =

Singles
- 2023 Sofia Open

Final
- Champion: (France) Adrian Mannarino
- Runner-up: (United Kingdom) Jack Draper
- Score: 7–6^{(8–6)}, 2–6, 6–3

Details
- Draw: 28 (4 Q / 3 WC )
- Seeds: 8

Events
Singles	Doubles
← 2022 ·	ATP Sofia Open	· 2024 →

Adrian Mannarino defeated Jack Draper in the final, 7–6^{(8–6)}, 2–6, 6–3 to win the singles tennis title at the 2023 Sofia Open. It was his third ATP Tour singles title of the season and the fifth of his career.

Marc-Andrea Hüsler was the defending champion, but lost in the first round to Billy Harris after qualifying into the main draw.

== Seeds ==
The top four seeds received a bye into the second round.

1. (Italy) Lorenzo Musetti (second round)
2. (France) Adrian Mannarino (champion)
3. (Germany) Jan-Lennard Struff (semifinals)
4. (Argentina) Sebastián Báez (second round, retired)
5. (Australia) Alexei Popyrin (withdrew)
6. (Australia) Max Purcell (second round)
7. (Austria) Sebastian Ofner (quarterfinals)
8. (Hungary) Márton Fucsovics (quarterfinals)
9. (Serbia) Miomir Kecmanović (first round)

== Draw ==
=== Key ===
- Q = Qualifier
- WC = Wild card
- LL = Lucky loser
- Alt = Alternate
- SE = Special exempt
- PR = Protected ranking
- ITF = ITF entry
- JE = Junior exempt
- w/o = Walkover
- r = Retired
- d = Defaulted
- SR = Special ranking

=== Finals ===
Semifinals
(United Kingdom) Jack Draper	6	6
3	(Germany) Jan-Lennard Struff	3	4
Pavel Kotov	2	6^{2}
2	(France) Adrian Mannarino	6	7^{7}

Final
(United Kingdom) Jack Draper	6^{6}	6	3
2	(France) Adrian Mannarino	7^{8}	2	6

=== Top half ===
First round
(United Kingdom) J Draper	6	6
(Germany) M Marterer	3	2
WC	(Turkey) C İlkel	6	6
WC	(Bulgaria) D Kuzmanov	0	3
(Australia) R Hijikata	3	3
6	(Australia) M Purcell	6	6
Q	(United Kingdom) B Harris	6	3	7^{7}
Q	(Switzerland) M-A Hüsler	4	6	6^{5}
(Hungary) Z Piros	3	1
(Hungary) F Marozsán	6	6
(Spain) R Bautista Agut	7^{11}	6^{2}	7^{7}
9	(Serbia) M Kecmanović	6^{9}	7^{7}	6^{5}

Second round
1	(Italy) L Musetti	5	2
(United Kingdom) J Draper	7	6
WC	(Turkey) C İlkel	6	4	6
6	(Australia) M Purcell	3	6	4
3	(Germany) J-L Struff	7^{7}	6
Q	(United Kingdom) B Harris	6^{5}	4
(Hungary) F Marozsán	6	3	7^{7}
(Spain) R Bautista Agut	3	6	6^{4}

Quarterfinals
(United Kingdom) J Draper	6	6
WC	(Turkey) C İlkel	2	2
3	(Germany) J-L Struff	7^{7}	4	6
(Hungary) F Marozsán	6^{3}	6	4

Semifinals
(United Kingdom) J Draper	6	6
3	(Germany) J-L Struff	3	4

=== Bottom half ===
First round
8	(Hungary) M Fucsovics	7^{7}	6
Q	(France) T Atmane	6^{4}	3
(Austria) J Rodionov	7^{7}	6^{4}	6
LL	(United States) N Moreno de Alboran	6^{4}	7^{7}	4
WC	(Bulgaria) A Lazarov	6	1	2
P Kotov	3	6	6
7	(Austria) S Ofner	6	3	6
Q	(Ukraine) V Sachko	4	6	2
(Serbia) H Medjedovic	7^{7}	1	6^{2}
(Australia) C O'Connell	6^{3}	6	7^{7}
(Spain) R Carballés Baena	5	6	3
(Spain) A Ramos Viñolas	7	4	6

Second round
8	(Hungary) M Fucsovics	3	6	6
(Austria) J Rodionov	6	4	1
P Kotov	3	7^{7}	0
4	(Argentina) S Báez	6	6^{4}	0^{r}
7	(Austria) S Ofner	6^{6}	6	6
(Australia) C O'Connell	7^{8}	4	2
(Spain) A Ramos Viñolas	4	4
2	(France) A Mannarino	6	6

Quarterfinals
8	(Hungary) M Fucsovics	3	6^{3}
P Kotov	6	7^{7}
7	(Austria) S Ofner	7^{9}	4	3
2	(France) A Mannarino	6^{7}	6	6

Semifinals
P Kotov	2	6^{2}
2	(France) A Mannarino	6	7^{7}

== Qualifying ==
=== Seeds ===
1. (France) Térence Atmane (qualified)
2. (United States) Nicolas Moreno de Alboran (qualifying competition, lucky loser)
3. (Ukraine) Vitaliy Sachko (qualified)
4. (Switzerland) Marc-Andrea Hüsler (qualified)
5. (Ukraine) Illya Marchenko (qualifying competition)
6. (Italy) Francesco Passaro (qualifying competition)
7. (Bosnia and Herzegovina) Nerman Fatić (qualifying competition)
8. (United Kingdom) Billy Harris (qualified)

=== Qualifiers ===
1. (France) Térence Atmane
2. (United Kingdom) Billy Harris
3. (Ukraine) Vitaliy Sachko
4. (Switzerland) Marc-Andrea Hüsler

=== Lucky loser ===
1. (United States) Nicolas Moreno de Alboran

=== Qualifying draw ===
==== First qualifier ====
First round
1	(France) Térence Atmane	7^{7}	7^{7}
Evgeny Donskoy	6^{2}	6^{4}
(Italy) Lorenzo Giustino	6^{0}	7^{7}	3
5	(Ukraine) Illya Marchenko	7^{7}	6^{5}	6

Qualifying competition
1	(France) Térence Atmane	7^{7}	7
5	(Ukraine) Illya Marchenko	6^{3}	5

==== Second qualifier ====
First round
2	(United States) Nicolas Moreno de Alboran	6	6
WC	(Bulgaria) Alexander Donski	3	4
(Turkey) Yankı Erel	6^{3}	6	6^{3}
8	(United Kingdom) Billy Harris	7^{7}	4	7^{7}

Qualifying competition
2	(United States) Nicolas Moreno de Alboran	2	1
8	(United Kingdom) Billy Harris	6	6

==== Third qualifier ====
First round
3	(Ukraine) Vitaliy Sachko	2	7^{8}	6
(Turkey) Altuğ Çelikbilek	6	6^{6}	1
WC	(Bulgaria) Yanaki Milev	3	1
7	(Bosnia and Herzegovina) Nerman Fatić	6	6

Qualifying competition
3	(Ukraine) Vitaliy Sachko	6^{2}	6	7^{9}
7	(Bosnia and Herzegovina) Nerman Fatić	7^{7}	3	6^{7}

==== Fourth qualifier ====
First round
4	(Switzerland) Marc-Andrea Hüsler	6	7
Alt	(Austria) Alexander Erler	1	5
(Turkey) Ergi Kırkın	7	3	1
6	(Italy) Francesco Passaro	5	6	6

Qualifying competition
4	(Switzerland) Marc-Andrea Hüsler	6	7
6	(Italy) Francesco Passaro	4	5
