= 2024 Surbiton Trophy – Men's doubles =

Men's doubles
- 2024 Surbiton Trophy

Final
- Champions: (United Kingdom) Julian Cash (United States) Robert Galloway
- Runners-up: (Colombia) Nicolás Barrientos (Ecuador) Diego Hidalgo
- Score: 6–4, 6–4

Events
Singles	men	women
Doubles	men	women
← 2023 ·	Surbiton Trophy	· 2025 →

Liam Broady and Jonny O'Mara were the defending champions but chose not to defend their title.

Julian Cash and Robert Galloway won the title after defeating Nicolás Barrientos and Diego Hidalgo 6–4, 6–4 in the final.

== Seeds ==
1. (France) Sadio Doumbia / (France) Fabien Reboul (withdrew)
2. (India) Yuki Bhambri / (United Kingdom) Lloyd Glasspool (semifinals)
3. (United Kingdom) Julian Cash / (United States) Robert Galloway (champions)
4. (Colombia) Nicolás Barrientos / (Ecuador) Diego Hidalgo (final)
5. (Sweden) André Göransson / (United States) Reese Stalder (first round)

== Draw ==
=== Key ===
- Q = Qualifier
- WC = Wild card
- LL = Lucky loser
- Alt = Alternate
- ITF = ITF entry
- PR = Protected ranking
- SR = Special ranking
- SE = Special exempt
- JE = Junior exempt
- JR = Junior Accelerator Programme entrant
- CO = College Accelerator Programme entrant
- NG = Next Gen Accelerator Program entrant
- w/o = Walkover
- r = Retired
- d = Defaulted

=== Draw ===
First round
5	(Sweden) A Göransson (United States) R Stalder	6	3	[9]
(Estonia) M Lajal (Australia) A Popyrin	4	6	[11]
(United States) B Nakashima (United States) Z Svajda	6	6^{5}	[10]
(Australia) T Schoolkate (Australia) A Walton	2	7^{7}	[6]
3	(United Kingdom) J Cash (United States) R Galloway	6	6
(United States) A Michelsen (United States) E Nava	4	2
(United States) R Seggerman (United States) P Trhac	3	6	[11]
(United Kingdom) B Harris (United Kingdom) L Johnson	6	3	[9]
Alt	(Switzerland) L Riedi (Switzerland) D Stricker	6^{4}	3
WC	(United Kingdom) A Fery (United Kingdom) M Willis	7^{7}	6
(India) RC Bollipalli (India) N Kaliyanda Poonacha	6	6^{3}	[5]
4	(Colombia) N Barrientos (Ecuador) D Hidalgo	1	7^{7}	[10]
(India) A Chandrasekar (India) A Kadhe	6^{4}	6	[10]
WC	(United Kingdom) C Broom (United Kingdom) B Jones	7^{7}	4	[2]
(United States) M McDonald (China) J Shang	6^{5}	3
2	(India) Y Bhambri (United Kingdom) L Glasspool	7^{7}	6

Quarterfinals
(Estonia) M Lajal (Australia) A Popyrin	6	3	[11]
(United States) B Nakashima (United States) Z Svajda	4	6	[9]
3	(United Kingdom) J Cash (United States) R Galloway	7	7^{14}
(United States) R Seggerman (United States) P Trhac	5	6^{12}
WC	(United Kingdom) A Fery (United Kingdom) M Willis	2	6	[9]
4	(Colombia) N Barrientos (Ecuador) D Hidalgo	6	3	[11]
(India) A Chandrasekar (India) A Kadhe	2	3
2	(India) Y Bhambri (United Kingdom) L Glasspool	6	6

Semifinals
(Estonia) M Lajal (Australia) A Popyrin
3	(United Kingdom) J Cash (United States) R Galloway	w/o
4	(Colombia) N Barrientos (Ecuador) D Hidalgo	6	7^{9}
2	(India) Y Bhambri (United Kingdom) L Glasspool	3	6^{7}

Final
3	(United Kingdom) J Cash (United States) R Galloway	6	6
4	(Colombia) N Barrientos (Ecuador) D Hidalgo	4	4
