= 2026 Mubadala DC Open – Men's doubles =

Men's doubles
- 2026 Mubadala DC Open

Final
- Champions: (United Kingdom) Julian Cash (United Kingdom) Lloyd Glasspool
- Runners-up: (United States) Austin Krajicek (Croatia) Nikola Mektić
- Score: 6–3, 6–4
- Date: 2nd August 2026

Details
- Draw: 16
- Seeds: 4

Events
Singles	men	women
Doubles	men	women
- Washington Open

Julian Cash and Lloyd Glasspool defeated Austin Krajicek and Nikola Mektić in the final, 6–3, 6–4 to win the men's doubles tennis title at the 2026 Washington Open.

Simone Bolelli and Andrea Vavassori were the defending champions, but lost in the quarterfinals to Ariel Behar and Anirudh Chandrasekar.

== Seeds ==
1. (Italy) Simone Bolelli / (Italy) Andrea Vavassori (quarterfinals)
2. (United States) Christian Harrison / (United Kingdom) Neal Skupski (quarterfinals)
3. (United Kingdom) Julian Cash / (United Kingdom) Lloyd Glasspool (champions)
4. (Argentina) Guido Andreozzi / (France) Manuel Guinard (quarterfinals)

== Draw ==
Key

- Q = Qualifier
- WC = Wild card
- LL = Lucky loser
- Alt = Alternate
- ITF = ITF entry
- PR = Protected ranking
- SR = Special ranking
- SE = Special exempt
- JE = Junior exempt
- JR = Junior Accelerator Programme entrant
- CO = College Accelerator Programme entrant
- NG = Next Gen Accelerator Program entrant
- w/o = Walkover
- r = Retired
- d = Defaulted

=== Draw ===
First round
1	(Italy) S Bolelli (Italy) A Vavassori	6	6
(United States) R Cash (Austria) A Erler	4	4
LL	(Uruguay) A Behar (India) A Chandrasekar	3	7^{7}	[10]
(Portugal) F Cabral (United States) JJ Tracy	6	6^{2}	[8]
3	(United Kingdom) J Cash (United Kingdom) L Glasspool	6	6
PR	(India) Y Bhambri (New Zealand) M Venus	3	4
(France) S Doumbia (France) F Reboul	6	6
Q	(Brazil) F Romboli (Australia) J-P Smith	3	4
(Monaco) H Nys (France) É Roger-Vasselin	3	7^{7}	[10]
(France) T Arribagé (France) A Olivetti	6	6^{3}	[7]
(Austria) L Miedler (Australia) M Polmans	6^{7}	6^{6}
4	(Argentina) G Andreozzi (France) M Guinard	7^{9}	7^{8}
(United States) A Krajicek (Croatia) N Mektić	6	6
(Spain) R Jódar (United States) B Nakashima	4	4
WC	(Ecuador) D Hidalgo (United States) B Shelton	2	6	[7]
2	(United States) C Harrison (United Kingdom) N Skupski	6	3	[10]

Quarterfinals
1	(Italy) S Bolelli (Italy) A Vavassori	4	7	[9]
LL	(Uruguay) A Behar (India) A Chandrasekar	6	5	[11]
3	(United Kingdom) J Cash (United Kingdom) L Glasspool	w/o
(France) S Doumbia (France) F Reboul
(Monaco) H Nys (France) É Roger-Vasselin	2	6	[10]
4	(Argentina) G Andreozzi (France) M Guinard	6	3	[8]
(United States) A Krajicek (Croatia) N Mektić	7^{7}	6
2	(United States) C Harrison (United Kingdom) N Skupski	6^{4}	4

Semifinals
LL	(Uruguay) A Behar (India) A Chandrasekar	3	4
3	(United Kingdom) J Cash (United Kingdom) L Glasspool	6	6
(Monaco) H Nys (France) É Roger-Vasselin	6^{3}	6^{5}
(United States) A Krajicek (Croatia) N Mektić	7^{7}	7^{7}

Final
3	(United Kingdom) J Cash (United Kingdom) L Glasspool	6	6
(United States) A Krajicek (Croatia) N Mektić	3	4

== Qualifying ==
=== Seeds ===
1. (Brazil) Fernando Romboli / (Australia) John-Patrick Smith (qualified)
2. (Uruguay) Ariel Behar / (India) Anirudh Chandrasekar (first round, lucky losers)

=== Qualifiers ===
1. (Brazil) Fernando Romboli / (Australia) John-Patrick Smith

=== Lucky losers ===
1. (Uruguay) Ariel Behar / (India) Anirudh Chandrasekar

=== Qualifying draw ===
First round
1	(Brazil) Fernando Romboli (Australia) John-Patrick Smith	7^{7}	6
(Romania) Victor Cornea (Israel) Daniel Cukierman	6^{2}	2
WC	(United States) Stefan Kozlov (United States) Jordan Lee	6	6
2	(Uruguay) Ariel Behar (India) Anirudh Chandrasekar	3	2

Qualifying competition
1	(Brazil) Fernando Romboli (Australia) John-Patrick Smith	6	1	[10]
WC	(United States) Stefan Kozlov (United States) Jordan Lee	4	6	[7]
