= Julian Cash =

British tennis player (born 1996)

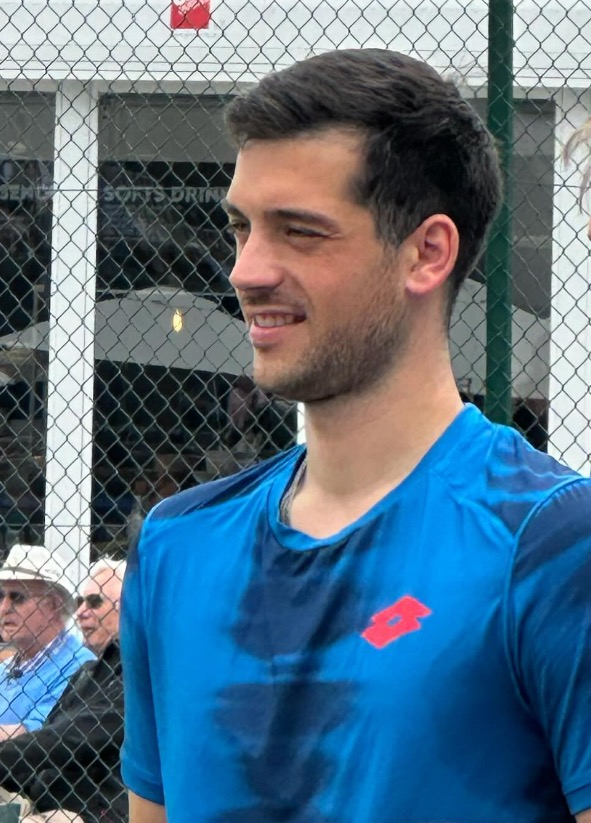
- Julian Cash at the 2024 Surbiton Trophy
- Country (sports): United Kingdom
- Born: 29 August 1996 (age 30) Brighton, England
- Height: 1.88 m (6 ft 2 in)
- Plays: Right-handed (two-handed backhand)
- College: Mississippi State; Oklahoma State
- Coach: Barry Fulcher, Luke Hammond
- Prize money: US $3,240,141

Singles
- Career record: 0–0
- Career titles: 0
- Highest ranking: No. 786 (1 August 2022)

Doubles
- Career record: 147–85
- Career titles: 14
- Highest ranking: No. 2 (18 August 2025)
- Current ranking: No. 21 (9 November 2026)

Grand Slam doubles results
- Australian Open: QF (2025)
- French Open: 3R (2025)
- Wimbledon: W (2025)
- US Open: 3R (2023, 2026)

Other doubles tournaments
- Tour Finals: SF (2025)

Mixed doubles
- Career record: 0–4
- Career titles: 0

Grand Slam mixed doubles results
- Australian Open: 2R (2026)
- French Open: 1R (2025, 2026)
- Wimbledon: 1R (2023, 2024, 2025, 2026)
- Last updated on: 9 November 2026.

Julian Cash (born 29 August 1996) is a British tennis player who specialises in doubles. He has a career high ATP doubles ranking of world No. 2 achieved on 18 August 2025. Cash won the 2025 Wimbledon title with Lloyd Glasspool becoming the first all-British team to win the title in 89 years. He has won an additional 13 ATP Tour doubles titles.

He has also won 17 ATP Challenger doubles titles, 11 with Henry Patten. Ten of the titles came in 2022, a record for most Challenger doubles titles in a single season. He also has a career high singles ranking of No. 786 achieved on 1 August 2022.

== Early life ==
Born in Brighton, Cash grew up in Burgess Hill and was privately educated at Bede's School in Eastbourne. He began playing tennis as a 7-year-old.

== Career ==
=== 2013: Juniors ===
As a junior he reached a highest ranking of No. 68 and participated in the boys' singles at the 2013 Wimbledon Championships, where he lost in the second round to Alexander Zverev. His favourite player growing up was Jo-Wilfried Tsonga.

=== 2014–2018: College years, No. 1 in NCAA doubles rankings ===
Cash played college tennis at Mississippi State University but transferred to Oklahoma State University following his freshman year. He reached No. 1 in the NCAA doubles rankings and No. 18 in singles. Most impressive is his result in the doubles victory while playing for Oklahoma State alongside partner Aarjun Kadhe against Bryant's top team of Michael Plutt and Nick Lamart.

=== 2022: Record ATP Challenger doubles titles in a season ===
Cash won ten titles in 2022, breaking the record for most ATP Challenger doubles titles in a single season with Henry Patten.

=== 2023: Three ATP finals, Top 50 ===
Cash reached his first ATP semifinal at the Tata Open Maharashtra partnering with Patten.

At the U.S. Men's Clay Court Championships Cash and Patten reached an ATP semifinal for a second time in the season and as a pair. Next they reached their first career final defeating Miguel Ángel Reyes-Varela and Robert Galloway. They lost to Max Purcell and Jordan Thompson. Cash reached the top 50 on 8 May 2023.

He reached his second ATP final partnering Yuki Bhambri at the Stockholm Open and his third at the 2023 Sofia Open partnering Nikola Mektic.

=== 2024: Three ATP titles, new partnership with Glasspool ===
He reached his fourth final with new partner Robert Galloway at the Delray Beach Open. Cash won his maiden ATP title defeating defending champion Santiago Gonzalez and his partner Neal Skupski.

Returning to the ATP Challenger Tour, Cash and Galloway followed up their victory by winning a clay court event in Bordeaux, France, in May and then claiming the title at the Surbiton Trophy on grass the following month. He reached his fifth final, and second for the season with Galloway, at the 2024 BOSS Open but they were defeated by Brazilians Marcelo Melo and Rafael Matos. Cash won his second title with Galloway at the Mallorca Championships, defeating Diego Hidalgo and Alejandro Tabilo in the final in straight sets. As a result, Cash reached the top 40 at world No. 39 on 1 July 2024. He reached his fourth final of the season with Galloway, at the 2024 Winston-Salem Open, defeating John Peers and Jamie Murray.

With new partner fellow Briton Lloyd Glasspool, he won the Japan Open, defeating Ariel Behar and Robert Galloway in the final.

=== 2025: Wimbledon champion, Masters title, World No. 2 ===
Playing alongside Lloyd Glasspool, Cash won the doubles title at the Brisbane International, defeating Jiří Lehečka and Jakub Menšík in the final. Cash and Glasspool defeated Ariel Behar and Robert Galloway in a deciding set tiebreak to reach the quarterfinals at the Australian Open, where they lost to fourth seeds Kevin Krawietz and Tim Pütz.

In February, Cash and Glasspool defeated fellow Britons Joe Salisbury and Neal Skupski in straight sets to win their second title of the year at the Qatar Open.

At the Miami Open Cash reached the final with Glasspool defeating Pedro Martinez and Giovanni Mpetshi Perricard, Yuki Bhambri and Nuno Borges, and then second seeded pair Harri Heliövaara and former partner Henry Patten, before losing to top seeds Marcelo Arévalo and Mate Pavić.

In April, Cash and Glasspool were runners-up at the Monte-Carlo Masters, losing to Romain Arneodo and Manuel Guinard in the final which went to a deciding champions tiebreak.

Seeded second on the grass-courts at 's-Hertogenbosch in June, they reached the final, but again lost in a deciding champions tiebreak to third seeds Matthew Ebden and Jordan Thompson. The following week, Cash and Glasspool became the first all-British pairing to win the doubles title at the Queen's Club Championships in the Open Era, defeating Nikola Mektić and Michael Venus in the final. Five days later, they made it back-to-back titles by defeating Ariel Behar and Joran Vliegen in the final at the Eastbourne Open. At Wimbledon, Glasspool and Cash defeated defending champions Harri Heliövaara and Henry Patten in the quarterfinals, then fourth seeds Marcel Granollers and Horacio Zeballos in the semifinals to become the first all-British pair to reach the final in the Open Era. In the final they defeated Rinky Hijikata and David Pel, becoming the first all-British team to win the title in 89 years.

In August at the Canadian Open, Cash and Glasspool extended their winning streak to 19 matches by defeating Joe Salisbury and Neal Skupski in the final to win their first ATP Masters 1000 title and in the process becoming the first team to qualify for the 2025 ATP Finals. Following reaching the semifinals at the Cincinnati Open, defeating Matthew Ebden/Jordan Thompson and Simone Bolelli/Andrea Vavassori, Cash claimed the world No. 2 in the doubles rankings on 18 August 2025. Their loss to Rajeev Ram and Nikola Mektić ended their 22 match winning streak.

The following month, Cash and Glasspool made their debuts for the Great Britain Davis Cup team together against Poland in their World Group I tie in Gdynia, losing to Karol Drzewiecki and Jan Zieliński.

In October, Cash and Glasspool won the Vienna Open, defeating Lucas Miedler and Francisco Cabral in the final. They were runners-up at the Paris Masters, losing to Harri Heliövaara and Henry Patten in the final.

After defeating Kevin Krawietz and Tim Pütz in their second group match at the ATP Finals, Cash and Glasspool secured the year-end ATP No. 1 doubles team ranking, becoming the first all British pair to achieve the feat. They went on to reach the semifinals at the season-ending showpiece event, but lost to Joe Salisbury and Neal Skupski in a match which went to a deciding champions tiebreak.

=== 2026: 10th title with Glasspool, first Davis Cup match win ===
Cash and Glasspool began their 2026 season by reaching the final at the Brisbane International, losing to Francisco Cabral and Lucas Miedler. In February they defeated Nicolai Budkov Kjær and Viktor Durasovic to claim their first Davis Cup match win and help Great Britain to a 4–0 overall tie victory against Norway in the first round qualifier in Oslo. Two weeks later at the Qatar Open, Cash and Glasspool made it through to their second final of the year, but they again had to settle for being runners-up as they lost to Harri Heliövaara and Henry Patten.

In April at the Barcelona Open, Cash and Glasspool defeated Pierre-Hugues Herbert and Andrea Vavassori in the final to claim their first title of the season.

Defending their title at Wimbledon, they lost in the quarterfinals to sixth seeds Marcelo Arévalo and Mate Pavić.

Seeded third at the Washington Open, Cash and Glasspool won their second ATP Tour title of the season and 10th as a partnership overall, defeating Austin Krajicek and Nikola Mektić in the final. In October, they won the China Open, overcoming Sander Arends and David Pel in the final. Three weeks later, as top seeds Cash and Glasspool won the Lyon Open, defeating second seeds Théo Arribagé and Albano Olivetti in the final.

== Doubles performance timeline ==
Key
W	F	SF	QF	#R	RR	Q#	DNQ	A	NH

(W) winner; (F) finalist; (SF) semifinalist; (QF) quarterfinalist; (#R) rounds 4, 3, 2, 1; (RR) round-robin stage; (Q#) qualification round; (DNQ) did not qualify; (A) absent; (NH) not held; (SR) strike rate (events won / competed); (W–L) win–loss record.
To avoid confusion and double counting, these charts are updated at the conclusion of a tournament or when the player's participation has ended.

=== Men's doubles ===
Current through the 2026 Washington Open.

Tournament	2021	2022	2023	2024	2025	2026	SR	W–L
Grand Slam tournaments
Australian Open	A	A	2R	1R	QF	2R	0 / 4	5–4
French Open	A	A	1R	1R	3R	2R	0 / 4	3–4
Wimbledon	A	1R	1R	2R	W	QF	1 / 5	10–4
US Open	A	A	3R	2R	1R	3R	0 / 4	5–4
Win–loss	0–0	0–1	3–4	2–4	11–3	7–4	1 / 17	23–16
Year-end championship
ATP Finals	Did not qualify				SF		0 / 1	2–2
National representation
Davis Cup	A	A	A	A	G1		0 / 1	1–1
ATP Tour Masters 1000
Indian Wells Open	A	A	A	A	2R	1R	0 / 2	1–2
Miami Open	A	A	A	1R	F	2R	0 / 3	5–3
Monte-Carlo Masters	A	A	A	A	F	QF	0 / 2	5–2
Madrid Open	A	A	A	A	A	1R	0 / 1	0–1
Italian Open	A	A	A	A	1R	1R	0 / 2	0–2
Canadian Open	A	A	A	A	W	1R	1 / 2	5–1
Cincinnati Open	A	A	A	1R	SF	1R	0 / 3	3–3
Shanghai Masters	NH		A	2R	A	F	0 / 2	4–3
Paris Masters	A	A	A	A	F		0 / 1	3–1
Win–loss	0–0	0–0	0–0	1–3	20–6	2–8	1 / 18	26–18
Career statistics
Tournaments	0	2	19	28	24	17	90	
Titles	0	0	0	3	7	2	12	
Finals	0	0	3	5	11	4	23	
Overall win–loss	0–0	0–2	19–19	31–25	60–18	25–15	135–79	
Win %	0%	0%	50%	55%	77%	63%	63%	
Year-end ranking	563	70	50	37	2			

=== Mixed doubles ===
Tournament	2021	2022	2023	2024	2025	SR	W–L
Australian Open	A	A	A	A	A	0 / 0	0–0
French Open	A	A	A	A	1R	0 / 1	0–1
Wimbledon	A	A	1R	1R	1R	0 / 3	0–3
US Open	A	A	A	A	A	0 / 0	0–0
Win–loss	0–0	0–0	0–1	0–1	0–2	0 / 4	0–4

== Significant finals ==
=== Grand Slam tournaments ===
==== Doubles: 1 (1 title) ====
Result	Year	Tournament	Surface	Partner	Opponents	Score
Win	2025	Wimbledon	Grass	(United Kingdom) Lloyd Glasspool	(Australia) Rinky Hijikata (Netherlands) David Pel	6–2, 7–6^{(7–3)}

=== Masters 1000 finals ===
==== Doubles: 4 (1 title, 3 runner-ups) ====
Outcome	Year	Championship	Surface	Partner	Opponents	Score
Loss	2025	Miami Open	Hard	(United Kingdom) Lloyd Glasspool	(El Salvador) Marcelo Arévalo (Croatia) Mate Pavić	6–7^{(3–7)}, 3–6
Loss	2025	Monte-Carlo Masters	Clay	(United Kingdom) Lloyd Glasspool	(Monaco) Romain Arneodo (France) Manuel Guinard	6–1, 6–7^{(8–10)}, [8–10]
Win	2025	Canadian Open	Hard	(United Kingdom) Lloyd Glasspool	(United Kingdom) Joe Salisbury (United Kingdom) Neal Skupski	6–3, 6–7^{(5–7)}, [13–11]
Loss	2025	Paris Masters	Hard (i)	(United Kingdom) Lloyd Glasspool	(Finland) Harri Heliövaara (United Kingdom) Henry Patten	4–6, 4–6

== ATP career finals ==
=== Doubles: 25 (14 titles, 11 runner-ups) ===
Legend Grand Slam (1–0) ATP Masters 1000 (1–2) ATP 500 Series (7–1) ATP 250 Series (5–7)	Finals by surface Hard (9–7) Clay (1–2) Grass (4–2)	Titles by setting Outdoor (12–8) Indoor (2–3)

Result	W–L	Date	Tournament	Tier	Surface	Partner	Opponents	Score
Loss	0–1	Apr 2023	US Clay Court Championships, United States	250 Series	Clay	(United Kingdom) Henry Patten	(Australia) Max Purcell (Australia) Jordan Thompson	6–4, 4–6, [5–10]
Loss	0–2	Oct 2023	Stockholm Open, Sweden	250 Series	Hard (i)	(India) Yuki Bhambri	(Kazakhstan) Andrey Golubev (Ukraine) Denys Molchanov	6–7^{(8–10)}, 2–6
Loss	0–3	Nov 2023	Sofia Open, Bulgaria	250 Series	Hard (i)	(Croatia) Nikola Mektić	(Ecuador) Gonzalo Escobar (Kazakhstan) Aleksandr Nedovyesov	3–6, 6–3, [11–13]
Win	1–3	Feb 2024	Delray Beach Open, United States	250 Series	Hard	(United States) Robert Galloway	(Mexico) Santiago González (United Kingdom) Neal Skupski	5–7, 7–5, [10–2]
Loss	1–4	Jun 2024	Stuttgart Open, Germany	250 Series	Grass	(United States) Robert Galloway	(Brazil) Rafael Matos (Brazil) Marcelo Melo	6–3, 3–6, [8–10]
Win	2–4	Jun 2024	Mallorca Championships, Spain	250 Series	Grass	(United States) Robert Galloway	(Ecuador) Diego Hidalgo (Chile) Alejandro Tabilo	6–4, 6–4
Loss	2–5	Aug 2024	Winston-Salem Open, United States	250 Series	Hard	(United States) Robert Galloway	(United States) Nathaniel Lammons (United States) Jackson Withrow	4–6, 3–6
Win	3–5	Oct 2024	Japan Open, Japan	500 Series	Hard	(United Kingdom) Lloyd Glasspool	(Uruguay) Ariel Behar (United States) Robert Galloway	6–4, 4–6, [12–10]
Win	4–5	Jan 2025	Brisbane International, Australia	250 Series	Hard	(United Kingdom) Lloyd Glasspool	(Czech Republic) Jiří Lehečka (Czech Republic) Jakub Menšík	6–3, 6–7^{(2–7)}, [10–6]
Win	5–5	Feb 2025	Qatar Open, Qatar	500 Series	Hard	(United Kingdom) Lloyd Glasspool	(United Kingdom) Joe Salisbury (United Kingdom) Neal Skupski	6–3, 6–2
Loss	5–6	Mar 2025	Miami Open, United States	Masters 1000	Hard	(United Kingdom) Lloyd Glasspool	(El Salvador) Marcelo Arévalo (Croatia) Mate Pavić	6–7^{(3–7)}, 3–6
Loss	5–7	Apr 2025	Monte-Carlo Masters, Monaco	Masters 1000	Clay	(United Kingdom) Lloyd Glasspool	(Monaco) Romain Arneodo (France) Manuel Guinard	6–1, 6–7^{(8–10)}, [8–10]
Loss	5–8	Jun 2025	Rosmalen Championships, Netherlands	250 Series	Grass	(United Kingdom) Lloyd Glasspool	(Australia) Matthew Ebden (Australia) Jordan Thompson	4–6, 6–3, [7–10]
Win	6–8	Jun 2025	Queen's Club Championships, United Kingdom	500 Series	Grass	(United Kingdom) Lloyd Glasspool	(Croatia) Nikola Mektić (New Zealand) Michael Venus	6–3, 6–7^{(5–7)}, [10–6]
Win	7–8	Jun 2025	Eastbourne International, United Kingdom	250 Series	Grass	(United Kingdom) Lloyd Glasspool	(Uruguay) Ariel Behar (Belgium) Joran Vliegen	6–4, 7–6^{(7–5)}
Win	8–8	Jul 2025	Wimbledon Championships, United Kingdom	Grand Slam	Grass	(United Kingdom) Lloyd Glasspool	(Australia) Rinky Hijikata (Netherlands) David Pel	6–2, 7–6^{(7–3)}
Win	9–8	Aug 2025	Canadian Open, Canada	Masters 1000	Hard	(United Kingdom) Lloyd Glasspool	(United Kingdom) Joe Salisbury (United Kingdom) Neal Skupski	6–3, 6–7^{(5–7)}, [13–11]
Win	10–8	Oct 2025	Vienna Open, Austria	500 Series	Hard (i)	(United Kingdom) Lloyd Glasspool	(Portugal) Francisco Cabral (Austria) Lucas Miedler	6–1, 7–6^{(8–6)}
Loss	10–9	Nov 2025	Paris Masters, France	Masters 1000	Hard (i)	(United Kingdom) Lloyd Glasspool	(Finland) Harri Heliövaara (United Kingdom) Henry Patten	3–6, 4–6
Loss	10–10	Jan 2026	Brisbane International, Australia	250 Series	Hard	(United Kingdom) Lloyd Glasspool	(Portugal) Francisco Cabral (Austria) Lucas Miedler	3–6, 6–3, [8–10]
Loss	10–11	Feb 2026	Qatar Open, Qatar	500 Series	Hard	(United Kingdom) Lloyd Glasspool	(Finland) Harri Heliövaara (United Kingdom) Henry Patten	3–6, 3–6
Win	11–11	Apr 2026	Barcelona Open, Spain	500 Series	Clay	(United Kingdom) Lloyd Glasspool	(France) Pierre-Hugues Herbert (Italy) Andrea Vavassori	6–3, 6–4
Win	12–11	Aug 2026	Washington Open, United States	500 Series	Hard	(United Kingdom) Lloyd Glasspool	(United States) Austin Krajicek (Croatia) Nikola Mektić	6–3, 6–4
Win	13–11	Oct 2026	China Open, China	500 Series	Hard	(United Kingdom) Lloyd Glasspool	(Netherlands) Sander Arends (Netherlands) David Pel	6–3, 3–6, [10–6]
Win	14–11	Oct 2026	ATP Lyon Open, France	250 Series	Hard (i)	(United Kingdom) Lloyd Glasspool	(France) Théo Arribagé (France) Albano Olivetti	4–6, 6–3, [10–8]

== ATP Challenger and ITF Futures finals ==
=== Singles: 2 (0–2) ===
Legend ATP Challenger (0–0) ITF Futures (0–2)	Finals by surface Hard (0–2) Clay (0–0) Grass (0–0) Carpet (0–0)

Result	W–L	Date	Tournament	Tier	Surface	Opponent	Score
Loss	0–1	Jul 2017	Egypt F21, Sharm El Sheikh	Futures	Hard	(Italy) Lorenzo Frigerio	4–6, 3–6
Loss	0–2	Oct 2021	M15 Doha, Qatar	World Tennis Tour	Hard	(China) Hanwen Li	4–6, 3–6

=== Doubles: 41 (32 titles, 9 runner-ups) ===
Legend ATP Challenger (18–3) ITF Futures/World Tour (14–6)	Finals by surface Hard (25–7) Clay (3–1) Grass (4–1) Carpet (0–0)

Result	W–L	Date	Tournament	Tier	Surface	Partner	Opponents	Score
Loss	0–1	Nov 2014	USA F32, Pensacola	Futures	Clay	(France) Florian Lakat	(New Zealand) Ben McLachlan (United States) Justin S Shane	6–7^{(2–7)}, 2–6
Loss	0–2	Jul 2017	Egypt F21, Sharm El Sheikh	Futures	Hard	(United States) Tyler Mercier	(United States) Junior Alexander Ore (United States) Michael Zhu	2–6, 3–6
Win	1–2	Jan 2019	M15 Monastir, Tunisia	World Tour	Hard	(Tunisia) Anis Ghorbel	(Germany) Valentin Guenther (Austria) Philipp Schroll	7–5, 6–4
Loss	1–3	Feb 2019	M25 Barnstaple, United Kingdom	World Tour	Hard	(United Kingdom) Andrew Watson	(United Kingdom) Evan Hoyt (United Kingdom) Luke Johnson	6–3, 6–7^{(4–7)}, [6–10]
Win	2–3	Apr 2019	M15 Cancun, Mexico	World Tour	Hard	(United States) George Goldhoff	(Republic of Ireland) Julian Bradley (United States) Austin Rapp	6–3, 6–7^{(8–10)}, [10–6]
Win	3–3	Oct 2019	M15 Sharm El Sheikh, Egypt	World Tour	Hard	(Poland) Jan Zielinski	(Poland) Piotr Matuszewski (Poland) Daniel Michalski	7–6^{(7–2)}, 7–6^{(7–3)}
Loss	3–4	May 2021	M15 Jerusalem, Israel	World Tour	Hard	(United States) Felix Corwin	(Moldova) Alexander Cozbinov (Ukraine) Marat Deviatiarov	walkover
Win	4–4	May 2021	M15 Heraklion, Greece	World Tour	Hard	(United States) Reese Stalder	(United Kingdom) Billy Harris (United Kingdom) George Houghton	6–7^{(6–8)}, 6–0, [10–8]
Win	5–4	Jun 2021	M15 Monastir, Tunisia	World Tour	Hard	(United Kingdom) Mark Whitehouse	(New Zealand) Ajeet Rai (Spain) Benjamín Winter López	7–6^{(7–1)}, 6–3
Win	6–4	Oct 2021	M15 Doha, Qatar	World Tour	Hard	(Denmark) Christian Sigsgaard	(India) Saketh Myneni (Finland) Patrik Niklas-Salminen	6–4, 6–4
Win	7–4	Oct 2021	M15 Doha, Qatar	World Tour	Hard	(Denmark) Christian Sigsgaard	(China) Hanwen Li (Kazakhstan) Beibit Zhukayev	6–3, 6–3
Loss	7–5	Nov 2021	M15 New Delhi, India	World Tour	Hard	(Hungary) Zsombor Velcz	(India) Saketh Myneni (India) Vishnu Vardhan	3–6, 6–3, [11–13]
Loss	7–6	Dec 2021	M15 Monastir, Tunisia	World Tour	Hard	(Belgium) Loic Cloes	(France) Arthur Bouquier (France) Martin Breysach	3–6, 5–7
Win	8–6	Jan 2022	M25 Loughborough, United Kingdom	World Tour	Hard	(Germany) Lucas Gerch	(United Kingdom) Anton Matusevich (United Kingdom) Joshua Paris	6–4, 6–3
Win	9–6	Mar 2022	M15 Bengaluru, India	World Tour	Hard	(India) Arjun Kadhe	(India) Sasikumar Mukund (India) Vishnu Vardhan	7–6^{(7–5)}, 3–6, [10–7]
Win	10–6	Apr 2022	M25 Nottingham, United Kingdom	World Tour	Hard	(United Kingdom) Henry Patten	(India) Anirudh Chandrasekar (India) Vijay Sundar Prashanth	6–1, 6–4
Win	11–6	May 2022	M25 Nottingham, United Kingdom	World Tour	Hard	(United Kingdom) Henry Patten	(United Kingdom) Charles Broom (United Kingdom) Jan Choinski	7–6^{(7–5)}, 6–2
Win	12–6	May 2022	M25 Nottingham, United Kingdom	World Tour	Hard	(United Kingdom) Henry Patten	(Australia) Omar Jasika (Israel) Edan Leshem	6–3, 5–7, [10–2]
Win	13–6	May 2022	M15 Heraklion, Greece	World Tour	Hard	(United Kingdom) Charles Broom	(Italy) Gabriele Bosio (United Kingdom) Mark Whitehouse	7–5, 6–4
Win	14–6	Jun 2022	Surbiton, United Kingdom	Challenger	Grass	(United Kingdom) Henry Patten	(Kazakhstan) Aleksandr Nedovyesov (Pakistan) Aisam Qureshi	4–6, 6–3, [11–9]
Loss	14–7	Jun 2022	Nottingham, United Kingdom	Challenger	Grass	(United Kingdom) Henry Patten	(United Kingdom) Jonny O'Mara (United Kingdom) Ken Skupski	6–3, 2–6, [14–16]
Win	15–7	Jun 2022	Ilkley, United Kingdom	Challenger	Grass	(United Kingdom) Henry Patten	(India) Ramkumar Ramanathan (Australia) John-Patrick Smith	7–5, 6–4
Win	16–7	Jul 2022	M25 Roehampton, United Kingdom	World Tour	Grass	(United Kingdom) Henry Patten	(Switzerland) Luca Castelnuovo (Tunisia) Skander Mansouri	walkover
Win	17–7	Aug 2022	Granby, Canada	Challenger	Hard	(United Kingdom) Henry Patten	(France) Jonathan Eysseric (New Zealand) Artem Sitak	6–3, 6–2
Win	18–7	Sep 2022	Columbus, United States	Challenger	Hard (i)	(United Kingdom) Henry Patten	(United Kingdom) Charles Broom (Germany) Constantin Frantzen	6–2, 7–5
Win	19–7	Oct 2022	Fairfield, United States	Challenger	Hard	(United Kingdom) Henry Patten	(India) Anirudh Chandrasekar (India) Vijay Sundar Prashanth	6–3, 6–1
Win	20–7	Oct 2022	Las Vegas, United States	Challenger	Hard	(United Kingdom) Henry Patten	(Germany) Constantin Frantzen (United States) Reese Stalder	6–4, 7–6^{(7–1)}
Win	21–7	Oct 2022	Charlottesville, United States	Challenger	Hard (i)	(United Kingdom) Henry Patten	(United States) Alex Lawson (New Zealand) Artem Sitak	6–2, 6–4
Win	22–7	Nov 2022	Drummondville, Canada	Challenger	Hard (i)	(United Kingdom) Henry Patten	(United Kingdom) Arthur Fery (United Kingdom) Giles Hussey	6–3, 6–3
Win	23–7	Nov 2022	Andria, Italy	Challenger	Hard (i)	(United Kingdom) Henry Patten	(Italy) Francesco Forti (Italy) Marcello Serafini	6–7^{(3–7)}, 6–4, [10–4]
Win	24–7	Dec 2022	Maia, Portugal	Challenger	Clay (i)	(United Kingdom) Henry Patten	(Portugal) Nuno Borges (Portugal) Francisco Cabral	6–3, 3–6, [10–8]
Loss	24–8	Feb 2023	Pau, France	Challenger	Hard (i)	(Germany) Constantin Frantzen	(France) Albano Olivetti (France) Dan Added	3–6, 6–1, [10–8]
Win	25–8	Apr 2023	Sarasota, United States	Challenger	Clay	(United Kingdom) Henry Patten	(Argentina) Guido Andreozzi (Argentina) Guillermo Durán	7–6^{(7–4)}, 6–4
Loss	25–9	Aug 2023	Stanford, United States	Challenger	Hard	(United Kingdom) Henry Patten	(Ecuador) Diego Hidalgo (Colombia) Cristian Rodríguez	7–6^{(7–1)}, 4–6, [8-10]
Win	26–9	Oct 2023	Mouilleron-le-Captif, France	Challenger	Hard (i)	(United States) Robert Galloway	(United States) Maxime Cressy (Finland) Otto Virtanen	6–4, 5–7, [12–10]
Win	27–9	Oct 2023	Málaga, Spain	Challenger	Hard	(United States) Robert Galloway	(Australia) Andrew Harris (Australia) John-Patrick Smith	7–5, 6–2
Win	28–9	Oct 2023	Brest, France	Challenger	Hard (i)	(India) Yuki Bhambri	(United States) Robert Galloway (France) Albano Olivetti	6–7^{(5–7)}, 6–3, [10–5]
Win	29–9	Nov 2023	Danderyd, Sweden	Challenger	Hard (i)	(Netherlands) Bart Stevens	(India) Jeevan Nedunchezhiyan (India) Vijay Sundar Prashanth	6–7^{(7–9)}, 6–4, [10–7]
Win	30–9	May 2024	Bordeaux, France	Challenger	Clay	(United States) Robert Galloway	(France) Quentin Halys (France) Nicolas Mahut	6–3, 7–6^{(7–2)}
Win	31–9	Jun 2024	Surbiton, United Kingdom (2)	Challenger	Grass	(United States) Robert Galloway	(Colombia) Nicolas Barrientos (Ecuador) Diego Hidalgo	6–4, 6–4
Win	32–9	Nov 2024	Bratislava, Slovakia	Challenger	Hard (i)	(Colombia) Nicolás Barrientos	(Sweden) André Göransson (Netherlands) Sem Verbeek	6–3, 6–4
