= 2013 Challenger Banque Nationale de Saguenay – Singles =

Singles
- 2013 Challenger Banque Nationale de Saguenay

Final
- Champion: (Tunisia) Ons Jabeur
- Runner-up: (United States) Coco Vandeweghe
- Score: 6–7^{(0–7)}, 6–3, 6–3

Events
Singles	Doubles
← 2012 ·	Challenger de Saguenay	· 2014 →

Madison Keys was the defending champion, having won the event in 2012, but decided not to participate in 2013.

Ons Jabeur won the tournament, defeating Coco Vandeweghe in the final, 6–7^{(0–7)}, 6–3, 6–3.

== Seeds ==
1. (Hungary) Tímea Babos (semifinals)
2. (United States) Coco Vandeweghe (final)
3. (United States) Melanie Oudin (semifinals)
4. (United States) Maria Sanchez (first round)
5. (Czech Republic) Andrea Hlaváčková (first round)
6. (France) Alizé Lim (quarterfinals)
7. (Tunisia) Ons Jabeur (champion)
8. (United States) Sachia Vickery (second round)

== Main draw ==
=== Key ===
- Q = Qualifier
- WC = Wild card
- LL = Lucky loser
- Alt = Alternate
- SE = Special exempt
- PR = Protected ranking
- ITF = ITF entry
- JE = Junior exempt
- w/o = Walkover
- r = Retired
- d = Defaulted
- SR = Special ranking

=== Finals ===
Semifinals
1	(Hungary) Tímea Babos	6^{4}	6	1
7	(Tunisia) Ons Jabeur	7^{7}	4	6
3	(United States) Melanie Oudin	2	2
2	(United States) Coco Vandeweghe	6	6

Final
7	(Tunisia) Ons Jabeur	6^{0}	6	6
2	(United States) Coco Vandeweghe	7^{7}	3	3

=== Top half ===
First round
1	(Hungary) T Babos	6	6
Q	(Canada) É Fournier	3	3
(United States) J Boserup	7^{10}	6
Q	(United States) L Litvak	6^{8}	3
(United States) J Pegula	7	3	6
(United States) C-Y Hsu	5	6	3
(United States) V Duval	6	4	6
5	(Czech Republic) A Hlaváčková	3	6	4
4	(United States) M Sanchez	6	3	4
(Poland) M Domachowska	4	6	6
WC	(Canada) J O'Neill	7^{7}	5	4
WC	(Canada) M-A Leduc	6^{3}	7	6
(United States) J Abaza	1	1
Q	(United States) T Kinard	6	6
(United States) A Stevenson	4	3^{r}
7	(Tunisia) O Jabeur	6	4

Second round
1	(Hungary) T Babos	6	4	6
(United States) J Boserup	2	6	3
(United States) J Pegula	1	7^{7}	6
(United States) V Duval	6	6^{5}	2
(Poland) M Domachowska	6	6
WC	(Canada) M-A Leduc	2	2
Q	(United States) T Kinard	2	3
7	(Tunisia) O Jabeur	6	6

Quarterfinals
1	(Hungary) T Babos	7	6
(United States) J Pegula	5	3
(Poland) M Domachowska	6^{4}	6	3
7	(Tunisia) O Jabeur	7^{7}	2	6

Semifinals
1	(Hungary) T Babos	6^{4}	6	1
7	(Tunisia) O Jabeur	7^{7}	4	6

=== Bottom half ===
First round
8	(United States) S Vickery	6	6
(Canada) H El Tabakh	1	3
WC	(Canada) F Abanda	6	6
(United States) E Lumpkin	2	3
WC	(Canada) S Molnar	2	4
(Canada) G Dabrowski	6	6
(Portugal) B Luz	1	0
3	(United States) M Oudin	6	6
6	(France) A Lim	6	6
(Austria) N Rottmann	2	2
(Poland) J Jegiołka	5	6	3
(Japan) M Minokoshi	7	2	0^{r}
Q	(United States) C Whoriskey	6	4	3
(Switzerland) A Sadiković	2	6	6
(Netherlands) L van Riet	4	1
2	(United States) C Vandeweghe	6	6

Second round
8	(United States) S Vickery	6^{3}	2
WC	(Canada) F Abanda	7^{7}	6
(Canada) G Dabrowski	5	6	2
3	(United States) M Oudin	7	4	6
6	(France) A Lim	5	6	6
(Poland) J Jegiołka	7	2	2
(Switzerland) A Sadiković	1	0^{r}
2	(United States) C Vandeweghe	6	0

Quarterfinals
WC	(Canada) F Abanda	6^{5}	0
3	(United States) M Oudin	7^{7}	6
6	(France) A Lim	4	3
2	(United States) C Vandeweghe	6	6

Semifinals
3	(United States) M Oudin	2	2
2	(United States) C Vandeweghe	6	6
