= 2015 Challenger Banque Nationale de Saguenay – Doubles =

Doubles
- 2015 Challenger Banque Nationale de Saguenay

Final
- Champions: (Romania) Mihaela Buzărnescu (Poland) Justyna Jegiołka
- Runners-up: (Canada) Sharon Fichman (United States) Maria Sanchez
- Score: 7–6^{(8–6)}, 4–6, [10–7]

Events
Singles	Doubles
← 2014 ·	Challenger de Saguenay	· 2016 →

Ysaline Bonaventure and Nicola Slater were the defending champions, but decided not to participate this year.

Mihaela Buzărnescu and Justyna Jegiołka won the title, defeating Sharon Fichman and Maria Sanchez 7–6^{(8–6)}, 4–6, [10–7] in the final.

== Seeds ==
1. (Canada) Sharon Fichman / (United States) Maria Sanchez (final)
2. (Czech Republic) Barbora Krejčíková / (Canada) Carol Zhao (first round)
3. (United States) Ashley Weinhold / (United States) Caitlin Whoriskey (semifinals)
4. (Belgium) Marie Benoît / (United States) Samantha Crawford (quarterfinals)

== Draw ==
=== Key ===
- Q = Qualifier
- WC = Wild card
- LL = Lucky loser
- Alt = Alternate
- ITF = ITF entry
- PR = Protected ranking
- SR = Special ranking
- SE = Special exempt
- JE = Junior exempt
- JR = Junior Accelerator Programme entrant
- CO = College Accelerator Programme entrant
- NG = Next Gen Accelerator Program entrant
- w/o = Walkover
- r = Retired
- d = Defaulted

First round
1	(Canada) S Fichman (United States) M Sanchez	6	6
(Oman) F Al-Nabhani (India) KK Thandi	0	1
(Canada) M-A Leduc (Canada) C Robillard-Millette	7^{7}	6
(Serbia) J Jakšić (United States) M Oudin	6^{5}	3
3	(United States) A Weinhold (United States) C Whoriskey	6	6
(Germany) K Grajdek (United States) E Halbauer	2	3
WC	(Canada) R Cruickshank (Canada) S Peterson-Paul	1	3
(Mexico) S León (United States) J Pegula	6	6
(Romania) M Buzărnescu (Poland) J Jegiołka	6	6
WC	(Canada) P Januskova (Canada) A Wozniak	4	3
(Germany) A Lottner (Switzerland) A Sadiković	4	3
4	(Belgium) M Benoît (United States) S Crawford	6	6
WC	(Canada) I Boulais (Canada) M Drake	3	2
(United States) K Ahn (Hungary) F Stollár	6	6
(Netherlands) Q Lemoine (Netherlands) E Wacanno	7	6
2	(Czech Republic) B Krejčíková (Canada) C Zhao	5	4

Quarterfinals
1	(Canada) S Fichman (United States) M Sanchez	7	6
(Canada) M-A Leduc (Canada) C Robillard-Millette	5	0
3	(United States) A Weinhold (United States) C Whoriskey	6	6
(Mexico) S León (United States) J Pegula	2	1
(Romania) M Buzărnescu (Poland) J Jegiołka	1	6	[10]
4	(Belgium) M Benoît (United States) S Crawford	6	4	[5]
(United States) K Ahn (Hungary) F Stollár	4	6	[8]
(Netherlands) Q Lemoine (Netherlands) E Wacanno	6	4	[10]

Semifinals
1	(Canada) S Fichman (United States) M Sanchez	6	6
3	(United States) A Weinhold (United States) C Whoriskey	3	0
(Romania) M Buzărnescu (Poland) J Jegiołka	3	7^{7}	[10]
(Netherlands) Q Lemoine (Netherlands) E Wacanno	6	6^{4}	[6]

Final
1	(Canada) S Fichman (United States) M Sanchez	6^{6}	6	[7]
(Romania) M Buzărnescu (Poland) J Jegiołka	7^{8}	4	[10]
