= 2013 Challenger Banque Nationale de Saguenay – Doubles =

Doubles
- 2013 Challenger Banque Nationale de Saguenay

Final
- Champions: (Poland) Marta Domachowska (Czech Republic) Andrea Hlaváčková
- Runners-up: (Canada) Françoise Abanda (United States) Victoria Duval
- Score: 7–5, 6–3

Events
Singles	Doubles
← 2012 ·	Challenger de Saguenay	· 2014 →

Gabriela Dabrowski and Alla Kudryavtseva were the defending champions, but Kudryavtseva decided not to participate. Dabrowski partnered with Maria Sanchez but lost in the first round.

Second seeds Marta Domachowska and Andrea Hlaváčková won the title, defeating Françoise Abanda and Victoria Duval in the final, 7–5, 6–3.

== Seeds ==
1. (Canada) Gabriela Dabrowski / (United States) Maria Sanchez (first round)
2. (Poland) Marta Domachowska / (Czech Republic) Andrea Hlaváčková (champions)
3. (United States) Melanie Oudin / (United States) Jessica Pegula (first round)
4. (United States) Chieh-Yu Hsu / (Poland) Justyna Jegiołka (quarterfinals)

== Draw ==
=== Key ===
- Q = Qualifier
- WC = Wild card
- LL = Lucky loser
- Alt = Alternate
- SE = Special exempt
- PR = Protected ranking
- ITF = ITF entry
- JE = Junior exempt
- w/o = Walkover
- r = Retired
- d = Defaulted
- SR = Special ranking

First round
1	(Canada) G Dabrowski (United States) M Sanchez	6	6^{3}	[7]
(United States) E Harman (United States) E Lumpkin	2	7^{7}	[10]
(France) A Lim (Austria) N Rottmann
(Canada) F Abanda (United States) V Duval	w/o
3	(United States) M Oudin (United States) J Pegula	2	6	[9]
(United States) R Ellison (United States) S Ellison	6	4	[11]
(Portugal) B Luz (Netherlands) L van Riet	6^{7}	4
(Canada) É Fournier (Canada) P Januskova	7^{9}	6
(United States) J Abaza (United States) S Vickery	5	3
(United States) L Litvak (United States) C Whoriskey	7	6
(Canada) S Molnar (Canada) J O'Neill	4	7^{7}	[6]
4	(United States) C-Y Hsu (Poland) J Jegiołka	6	6^{3}	[10]
(United States) J Boserup (Switzerland) A Sadiković	4	6^{5}
(United States) M Kobelt (Mexico) V Salazar	6	7^{7}
(Canada) M-A Leduc (Canada) G Liang	2	2
2	(Poland) M Domachowska (Czech Republic) A Hlaváčková	6	6

Quarterfinals
(United States) E Harman (United States) E Lumpkin	3	4
(Canada) F Abanda (United States) V Duval	6	6
(United States) R Ellison (United States) S Ellison	7^{7}	6
(Canada) É Fournier (Canada) P Januskova	6^{4}	3
(United States) L Litvak (United States) C Whoriskey	7	2	[10]
4	(United States) C-Y Hsu (Poland) J Jegiołka	5	6	[4]
(United States) M Kobelt (Mexico) V Salazar	4	0
2	(Poland) M Domachowska (Czech Republic) A Hlaváčková	6	6

Semifinals
(Canada) F Abanda (United States) V Duval	6	6
(United States) R Ellison (United States) S Ellison	1	2
(United States) L Litvak (United States) C Whoriskey	4	2
2	(Poland) M Domachowska (Czech Republic) A Hlaváčková	6	6

Final
(Canada) F Abanda (United States) V Duval	5	3
2	(Poland) M Domachowska (Czech Republic) A Hlaváčková	7	6
