= 2015 Challenger Banque Nationale de Saguenay – Singles =

Singles
- 2015 Challenger Banque Nationale de Saguenay

Final
- Champion: (Serbia) Jovana Jakšić
- Runner-up: (Switzerland) Amra Sadiković
- Score: 6–3, 6–7^{(5–7)}, 6–1

Events
| Singles | Doubles |
| ← 2014 · | Challenger de Saguenay | · 2016 → |

Julie Coin was the defending champion, but decided not to participate this year.

Jovana Jakšić won the title, defeating Amra Sadiković 6–3, 6–7^{(5–7)}, 6–1 in the final.

== Seeds ==
1. (Switzerland) Romina Oprandi (withdrew)
2. (United States) Jessica Pegula (second round)
3. (Czech Republic) Barbora Krejčíková (first round)
4. (Israel) Shahar Pe'er (second round)
5. (United States) Samantha Crawford (quarterfinals)
6. (United States) Maria Sanchez (semifinals)
7. (Netherlands) Michaëlla Krajicek (second round)
8. (United States) Kristie Ahn (first round)

== Draw ==
=== Key ===
- Q = Qualifier
- WC = Wild card
- LL = Lucky loser
- Alt = Alternate
- ITF = ITF entry
- PR = Protected ranking
- SR = Special ranking
- SE = Special exempt
- JE = Junior exempt
- JR = Junior Accelerator Programme entrant
- CO = College Accelerator Programme entrant
- NG = Next Gen Accelerator Program entrant
- w/o = Walkover
- r = Retired
- d = Defaulted

=== Finals ===
Semifinals
(Switzerland) Amra Sadiković | 1 | 7^{7} | 6
6 | (United States) Maria Sanchez | 6 | 6^{2} | 1
Q | (United States) Nadja Gilchrist | 5 | 5
(Serbia) Jovana Jakšić | 7 | 7

Final
(Switzerland) Amra Sadiković | 3 | 7^{7} | 1
(Serbia) Jovana Jakšić | 6 | 6^{5} | 6

=== Top half ===
First round
LL | (India) KK Thandi | 4 | 6 | 1
Q | (Hungary) F Stollár | 6 | 4 | 6
(Switzerland) A Sadiković | 6 | 6
Q | (Japan) M Osaka | 3 | 3
(United States) C Whoriskey | 0 | 6^{2}
(Canada) C Zhao | 6 | 7^{7}
(Czech Republic) M Bouzková | 6^{6} | 2^{r}
7 | (Netherlands) M Krajicek | 7^{8} | 3
4 | (Israel) S Pe'er | 3 | 6 | 6
WC | (Canada) M-A Leduc | 6 | 2 | 2
(United States) E Halbauer | 3 | 4
WC | (Canada) C Robillard-Millette | 6 | 6
WC | (Canada) A Wozniak | 6^{4} | 6 | 3
(Netherlands) Q Lemoine | 7^{7} | 2 | 6
(Australia) O Rogowska | 1 | 7^{7} | 4
6 | (United States) M Sanchez | 6 | 6^{3} | 6

Second round
Q | (Hungary) F Stollár | 1 | 4
(Switzerland) A Sadiković | 6 | 6
(Canada) C Zhao | 1 | 7^{7} | 7^{7}
7 | (Netherlands) M Krajicek | 6 | 6^{1} | 6^{4}
4 | (Israel) S Pe'er | 1 | 6 | 3
WC | (Canada) C Robillard-Millette | 6 | 4 | 6
(Netherlands) Q Lemoine | 3 | 2
6 | (United States) M Sanchez | 6 | 6

Quarterfinals
(Switzerland) A Sadiković | 6 | 6
(Canada) C Zhao | 4 | 4
WC | (Canada) C Robillard-Millette | 5 | 0
6 | (United States) M Sanchez | 7 | 6

Semifinals
(Switzerland) A Sadiković | 1 | 7^{7} | 6
6 | (United States) M Sanchez | 6 | 6^{2} | 1

=== Bottom half ===
First round
8 | (United States) K Ahn | 4 | 4
Q | (United States) N Gilchrist | 6 | 6
WC | (Canada) I Boulais | 3 | 5
(Canada) S Fichman | 6 | 7
(Belgium) M Benoît | 5 | 3
Q | (United States) A Weinhold | 7 | 6
(Oman) F Al-Nabhani | 7^{7} | 4 | 7
3 | (Czech Republic) B Krejčíková | 6^{4} | 6 | 5
5 | (United States) S Crawford | 6 | 6
(United States) M Oudin | 1 | 4
(Belgium) K Liebens | 6 | 4 | 2
(Romania) M Buzărnescu | 4 | 6 | 6
(Poland) J Jegiołka | 0 | 6 | 2
(Serbia) J Jakšić | 6 | 4 | 6
(Germany) A Lottner | 4 | 4
2 | (United States) J Pegula | 6 | 6

Second round
Q | (United States) N Gilchrist | 6 | 6
(Canada) S Fichman | 4 | 2
Q | (United States) A Weinhold | 6 | 6
(Oman) F Al-Nabhani | 4 | 1
5 | (United States) S Crawford | 7^{7} | 6
(Romania) M Buzărnescu | 6^{5} | 3
(Serbia) J Jakšić | 3 | 7^{9} | 6
2 | (United States) J Pegula | 6 | 6^{7} | 4

Quarterfinals
Q | (United States) N Gilchrist | 3 | 7^{7} | 6
Q | (United States) A Weinhold | 6 | 6^{3} | 3
5 | (United States) S Crawford | 6^{0} | 3
(Serbia) J Jakšić | 7^{7} | 6

Semifinals
Q | (United States) N Gilchrist | 5 | 5
(Serbia) J Jakšić | 7 | 7
