= 2016 Challenger Banque Nationale de Saguenay – Singles =

Singles
- 2016 Challenger Banque Nationale de Saguenay

Final
- Champion: (United States) Catherine Bellis
- Runner-up: (Canada) Bianca Andreescu
- Score: 6–4, 6–2

Events
Singles	Doubles
- Challenger de Saguenay

Jovana Jakšić was the defending champion, but lost in the first round to Bianca Andreescu.

Catherine Bellis won the title, defeating Andreescu 6–4, 6–2 in the final.

== Seeds ==
1. (United States) Catherine Bellis (champion)
2. (United States) Jennifer Brady (semifinals)
3. (United States) Grace Min (first round)
4. (United States) Sachia Vickery (semifinals, withdrew)
5. (United States) Jessica Pegula (first round)
6. (Serbia) Jovana Jakšić (first round)
7. (Canada) Françoise Abanda (second round)
8. (Japan) Mayo Hibi (second round)

== Draw ==
Key

- Q = Qualifier
- WC = Wild card
- LL = Lucky loser
- Alt = Alternate
- ITF = ITF entry
- PR = Protected ranking
- SR = Special ranking
- SE = Special exempt
- JE = Junior exempt
- JR = Junior Accelerator Programme entrant
- CO = College Accelerator Programme entrant
- NG = Next Gen Accelerator Program entrant
- w/o = Walkover
- r = Retired
- d = Defaulted

=== Finals ===
Semifinals
1	(United States) Catherine Bellis	w/o
4	(United States) Sachia Vickery
JE	(Canada) Bianca Andreescu	7^{7}	3	7^{7}
2	(United States) Jennifer Brady	6^{4}	6	6^{5}

Final
1	(United States) Catherine Bellis	6	6
JE	(Canada) Bianca Andreescu	4	2

=== Top half ===
First round
1	(United States) C Bellis	6	6
(Germany) A Zaja	3	4
(Czech Republic) M Bouzková	6	6
WC	(Canada) V Wong	0	0
(United Kingdom) K Boulter	3	4
(Canada) A Wozniak	6	6
(United States) N Coopersmith	6^{2}	0
7	(Canada) F Abanda	7^{7}	6
4	(United States) S Vickery	7	3	6
Q	(United States) D Collins	5	6	2
(Hungary) N Totka	2	3
Q	(Canada) K Sebov	6	6
WC	(Canada) G Dabrowski	7^{7}	3	6^{10}
(United States) M Sanchez	6^{1}	6	7^{12}
(United Kingdom) K Swan	4	4
8	(Japan) M Hibi	6	6

Second round
1	(United States) C Bellis	6	6
(Czech Republic) M Bouzková	4	4
(Canada) A Wozniak	6	3	6
7	(Canada) F Abanda	0	6	3
4	(United States) S Vickery	4	7^{7}	7^{7}
Q	(Canada) K Sebov	6	6^{4}	6^{5}
(United States) M Sanchez	6	6
8	(Japan) M Hibi	3	1

Quarterfinals
1	(United States) C Bellis	6	6
(Canada) A Wozniak	2	4
4	(United States) S Vickery	6	7^{7}
(United States) M Sanchez	1	6^{0}

Semifinals
1	(United States) C Bellis	w/o
4	(United States) S Vickery

=== Bottom half ===
First round
6	(Serbia) J Jakšić	4	2
JE	(Canada) B Andreescu	6	6
(United States) L Albanese	6	7^{7}
(Austria) P König	3	6^{2}
(Romania) M Buzărnescu	2	6	1
(United Kingdom) H Dart	6	4	6
(United Kingdom) F Christie	6	7
3	(United States) G Min	2	5
5	(United States) J Pegula	1	6	1
Q	(Canada) C Robillard-Millette	6	3	6
WC	(Canada) L Chypyha	4	1
(United States) J Wacnik	6	6
(Germany) L Schaeder	6	6
WC	(Canada) C Leduc	3	0
Q	(Russia) E Bovina	2	3
2	(United States) J Brady	6	6

Second round
JE	(Canada) B Andreescu	6	6^{3}	6
(United States) L Albanese	2	7^{7}	4
(United Kingdom) H Dart	6	7^{8}
(United Kingdom) F Christie	4	6^{6}
Q	(Canada) C Robillard-Millette	6	7^{7}
(United States) J Wacnik	3	6^{3}
(Germany) L Schaeder	3	2
2	(United States) J Brady	6	6

Quarterfinals
JE	(Canada) B Andreescu	7^{7}	6
(United Kingdom) H Dart	6^{4}	4
Q	(Canada) C Robillard-Millette	3	6^{5}
2	(United States) J Brady	6	7^{7}

Semifinals
JE	(Canada) B Andreescu	7^{7}	3	7^{7}
2	(United States) J Brady	6^{4}	6	6^{5}
