= 2013 Challenger Banque Nationale de Saguenay =

- Date: October 21–27
- Edition: 8th
- Category: ITF Women's Circuit
- Prize money: US$50,000
- Surface: Hard – indoors
- Location: Saguenay, Quebec, Canada
- Venue: Club de tennis intérieur Saguenay

Champions

Singles
- (Tunisia) Ons Jabeur

Doubles
- (Poland) Marta Domachowska / (Czech Republic) Andrea Hlaváčková
← 2012 ·	Challenger de Saguenay	· 2014 →

The 2013 Challenger Banque Nationale de Saguenay was a professional tennis tournament played on indoor hard courts. It was the 8th edition of the tournament and part of the 2013 ITF Women's Circuit, offering a total of $50,000 in prize money. It took place in Saguenay, Quebec, Canada between October 21 and October 27, 2013.

== Singles main-draw entrants ==
=== Seeds ===
Country	Player	Rank^{1}	Seed
HUN	Tímea Babos	103	1
USA	CoCo Vandeweghe	116	2
USA	Melanie Oudin	122	3
USA	Maria Sanchez	139	4
CZE	Andrea Hlaváčková	142	5
FRA	Alizé Lim	159	6
TUN	Ons Jabeur	162	7
USA	Sachia Vickery	184	8

- ^{1} Rankings are as of October 14, 2013

=== Other entrants ===
The following players received wildcards into the singles main draw:

- (Canada) Françoise Abanda
- (Canada) Marie-Alexandre Leduc
- (Canada) Sonja Molnar
- (Canada) Jillian O'Neill

The following players received entry from the qualifying draw:

- (Canada) Élisabeth Fournier
- (United States) Tori Kinard
- (United States) Lena Litvak
- (United States) Caitlin Whoriskey

== Champions ==
=== Singles ===
- (Tunisia) Ons Jabeur def. (United States) CoCo Vandeweghe, 6–7^{(0–7)}, 6–3, 6–3

=== Doubles ===
- (Poland) Marta Domachowska / (Czech Republic) Andrea Hlaváčková def. (Canada) Françoise Abanda / (United States) Victoria Duval, 7–5, 6–3
