= 2015 Challenger Banque Nationale de Saguenay =

- Date: October 19–25
- Edition: 10th
- Category: ITF Women's Circuit
- Prize money: US$50,000
- Surface: Hard – indoors
- Location: Saguenay, Quebec, Canada
- Venue: Club de tennis intérieur Saguenay

Champions

Singles
- (Serbia) Jovana Jakšić

Doubles
- (Romania) Mihaela Buzărnescu / (Poland) Justyna Jegiołka
← 2014 ·	Challenger de Saguenay	· 2016 →

The 2015 Challenger Banque Nationale de Saguenay was a professional tennis tournament played on indoor hard courts. It was the 10th edition of the tournament and part of the 2015 ITF Women's Circuit, offering a total of $50,000 in prize money. It took place in Saguenay, Quebec, Canada between October 19 and October 25, 2015.

== Singles main-draw entrants ==
=== Seeds ===
Country	Player	Rank^{1}	Seed
~~SUI~~	~~Romina Oprandi~~	~~119~~	~~1~~
USA	Jessica Pegula	151	2
CZE	Barbora Krejčíková	161	3
ISR	Shahar Pe'er	174	4
USA	Samantha Crawford	178	5
USA	Maria Sanchez	182	6
NED	Michaëlla Krajicek	189	7
USA	Kristie Ahn	223	8

- ^{1} Rankings are as of October 12, 2015

=== Other entrants ===
The following players received wildcards into the singles main draw:

- (Canada) Isabelle Boulais
- (Canada) Marie-Alexandre Leduc
- (Canada) Charlotte Robillard-Millette
- (Canada) Aleksandra Wozniak

The following players received entry from the qualifying draw:

- (United States) Nadja Gilchrist
- (Japan) Mari Osaka
- (Hungary) Fanny Stollár
- (United States) Ashley Weinhold

The following player received entry as a lucky loser:

- (India) Karman Kaur Thandi

== Champions ==
=== Singles ===
- (Serbia) Jovana Jakšić def. (Switzerland) Amra Sadiković, 6–3, 6–7^{(5–7)}, 6–1

=== Doubles ===
- (Romania) Mihaela Buzărnescu / (Poland) Justyna Jegiołka def. (Canada) Sharon Fichman / (United States) Maria Sanchez, 7–6^{(8–6)}, 4–6, [10–7]
