= 2014 Challenger Banque Nationale de Saguenay – Singles =

Singles
- 2014 Challenger Banque Nationale de Saguenay

Final
- Champion: (France) Julie Coin
- Runner-up: (Serbia) Jovana Jakšić
- Score: 7–5, 6–3

Events
Singles	Doubles
- Challenger de Saguenay

Ons Jabeur was the defending champion, but chose to participate in Poitiers instead.

Julie Coin won the tournament, defeating Jovana Jakšić in the final, 7–5, 6–3.

== Seeds ==
1. (United States) Taylor Townsend (first round)
2. (Serbia) Jovana Jakšić (final)
3. (Switzerland) Romina Oprandi (quarterfinals)
4. (Belgium) An-Sophie Mestach (second round)
5. (Israel) Julia Glushko (first round)
6. (Canada) Françoise Abanda (first round)
7. (Japan) Miharu Imanishi (second round; retired)
8. (Liechtenstein) Stephanie Vogt (semifinals)

== Main draw ==
Key

- Q = Qualifier
- WC = Wild card
- LL = Lucky loser
- Alt = Alternate
- ITF = ITF entry
- PR = Protected ranking
- SR = Special ranking
- SE = Special exempt
- JE = Junior exempt
- JR = Junior Accelerator Programme entrant
- CO = College Accelerator Programme entrant
- NG = Next Gen Accelerator Program entrant
- w/o = Walkover
- r = Retired
- d = Defaulted

=== Finals ===
Semifinals
(France) Julie Coin	6	2	7^{8}
8	(Liechtenstein) Stephanie Vogt	3	6	6^{6}
(Belgium) Ysaline Bonaventure	2	6	3
2	(Serbia) Jovana Jakšić	6	1	6

Final
(France) Julie Coin	7	6
2	(Serbia) Jovana Jakšić	5	3

=== Top half ===
First round
1	(United States) T Townsend	4	2
(France) J Coin	6	6
(Canada) S Molnar	6	6
WC	(Canada) P Januskova	3	3
(Belgium) K Liebens	6	0	6
(Poland) J Jegiołka	2	6	3
(Austria) P König	6	7
6	(Canada) F Abanda	3	5
3	(Switzerland) R Oprandi	6	6
WC	(Canada) M Patrascu	1	0
(Germany) N Zander	6	6
Q	(Canada) R Johanson	0	2
Q	(United States) N Gilchrist	1	2
(United Kingdom) E Webley-Smith	6	6
(Netherlands) C Burger	4	6^{5}
8	(Liechtenstein) S Vogt	6	7^{7}

Second round
(France) J Coin	6	6
(Canada) S Molnar	2	2
(Belgium) K Liebens	7^{7}	1	2
(Austria) P König	6^{4}	6	6
3	(Switzerland) R Oprandi	6	3	6
(Germany) N Zander	4	6	4
(United Kingdom) E Webley-Smith	1	0^{r}
8	(Liechtenstein) S Vogt	6	1

Quarterfinals
(France) J Coin	6	6
(Austria) P König	4	2
3	(Switzerland) R Oprandi	3	2
8	(Liechtenstein) S Vogt	6	6

Semifinals
(France) J Coin	6	2	7^{8}
8	(Liechtenstein) S Vogt	3	6	6^{6}

=== Bottom half ===
First round
7	(Japan) M Imanishi	1	6	7
(Austria) L-M Moser	6	4	5
(France) C Sibille	2	6	1
(United States) M Sanchez	6	4	6
(Belgium) Y Bonaventure	6	6
Q	(Germany) K Grajdek	1	2
WC	(Canada) C Robillard-Millette	1	3
4	(Belgium) A-S Mestach	6	6
5	(Israel) J Glushko	6	3	6^{3}
(Russia) V Savinykh	2	6	7^{7}
(United States) C Whoriskey	7	7^{7}
(United States) A Stevenson	5	6^{0}
Q	(Canada) A Broomfield	2	6	6
LL	(United States) L Albanese	6	1	1
WC	(Canada) M-A Leduc	4	4
2	(Serbia) J Jakšić	6	6

Second round
7	(Japan) M Imanishi	2	0^{r}
(United States) M Sanchez	6	1
(Belgium) Y Bonaventure	3	6	6
4	(Belgium) A-S Mestach	6	3	2
(Russia) V Savinykh	4	4
(United States) C Whoriskey	6	6
Q	(Canada) A Broomfield	4	4
2	(Serbia) J Jakšić	6	6

Quarterfinals
(United States) M Sanchez	1	2
(Belgium) Y Bonaventure	6	6
(United States) C Whoriskey	3	7	2
2	(Serbia) J Jakšić	6	5	6

Semifinals
(Belgium) Y Bonaventure	2	6	3
2	(Serbia) J Jakšić	6	1	6
