= 2012 Challenger Banque Nationale de Saguenay – Doubles =

Doubles
- 2012 Challenger Banque Nationale de Saguenay

Final
- Champions: (Canada) Gabriela Dabrowski (Russia) Alla Kudryavtseva
- Runners-up: (Canada) Sharon Fichman (Canada) Marie-Ève Pelletier
- Score: 6–2, 6–2

Events
Singles	Doubles
- Challenger de Saguenay

Tímea Babos and Jessica Pegula were the defending champions, but Babos chose not to participate. Pegula partnered up with Eugenie Bouchard, but they lost in the Quarterfinals to Macall Harkins and Nicole Rottmann.

Gabriela Dabrowski and Alla Kudryavtseva won the title with a 6–2, 6–2 win over Sharon Fichman and Marie-Ève Pelletier.

== Seeds ==
1. (United States) Irina Falconi / (United States) Maria Sanchez (quarterfinals, withdrew)
2. (Canada) Gabriela Dabrowski / (Russia) Alla Kudryavtseva (champions)
3. (Canada) Sharon Fichman / (Canada) Marie-Ève Pelletier (final)
4. (Canada) Eugenie Bouchard / (United States) Jessica Pegula (quarterfinals)

== Draw ==
Key

- Q = Qualifier
- WC = Wild card
- LL = Lucky loser
- Alt = Alternate
- ITF = ITF entry
- PR = Protected ranking
- SR = Special ranking
- SE = Special exempt
- JE = Junior exempt
- JR = Junior Accelerator Programme entrant
- CO = College Accelerator Programme entrant
- NG = Next Gen Accelerator Program entrant
- w/o = Walkover
- r = Retired
- d = Defaulted

First round
1	(United States) I Falconi (United States) M Sanchez	6	6
(United States) E Clark (United States) N Echeverria Alam	2	1
WC	(Canada) F Abanda (Canada) R Marino	w/o
(Germany) K Grajdek (Poland) J Jegiołka
3	(Canada) S Fichman (Canada) M-È Pelletier	6	6
WC	(Canada) M-A Leduc (Canada) C Petrick	3	2
(Oman) F Al Nabhani (Germany) K Wörle	6	7
(United States) L Litvak (United Kingdom) S Murray	3	5
(United States) A Mueller (United States) A Will	6^{2}	2
(United States) M Harkins (Austria) N Rottmann	7^{7}	6
(France) S Benamar (United States) J Elie	4	5
4	(Canada) E Bouchard (United States) J Pegula	6	7
(Canada) E Routliffe (Canada) C Zhao	6	6
WC	(Canada) G Liang (Canada) A Prokopuik	3	2
(Slovakia) M Hončová (France) V Larrière	0	0
2	(Canada) G Dabrowski (Russia) A Kudryavtseva	6	6

Quarterfinals
1	(United States) I Falconi (United States) M Sanchez
WC	(Canada) F Abanda (Canada) R Marino	w/o
3	(Canada) S Fichman (Canada) M-È Pelletier	4	6	[10]
(Oman) F Al Nabhani (Germany) K Wörle	6	2	[3]
(United States) M Harkins (Austria) N Rottmann	6	3	[10]
4	(Canada) E Bouchard (United States) J Pegula	3	6	[6]
(Canada) E Routliffe (Canada) C Zhao	4	2
2	(Canada) G Dabrowski (Russia) A Kudryavtseva	6	6

Semifinals
WC	(Canada) F Abanda (Canada) R Marino	3	4
3	(Canada) S Fichman (Canada) M-È Pelletier	6	6
(United States) M Harkins (Austria) N Rottmann	6	4	[9]
2	(Canada) G Dabrowski (Russia) A Kudryavtseva	0	6	[11]

Finals
3	(Canada) S Fichman (Canada) M-È Pelletier	2	2
2	(Canada) G Dabrowski (Russia) A Kudryavtseva	6	6
