= 2016 Challenger Banque Nationale de Saguenay =

- Date: October 17–23
- Edition: 11th
- Category: ITF Women's Circuit
- Prize money: US$50,000
- Surface: Hard – indoors
- Location: Saguenay, Quebec, Canada
- Venue: Club de tennis intérieur Saguenay

Champions

Singles
- (United States) Catherine Bellis

Doubles
- (Romania) Elena Bogdan / (Romania) Mihaela Buzărnescu
- Challenger de Saguenay

The 2016 Challenger Banque Nationale de Saguenay was a professional tennis tournament played on indoor hard courts. It was the 11th edition of the tournament and part of the 2016 ITF Women's Circuit, offering a total of $50,000 in prize money. It took place in Saguenay, Quebec, Canada between October 17 and October 23, 2016.

== Singles main-draw entrants ==
=== Seeds ===
Country	Player	Rank^{1}	Seed
USA	Catherine Bellis	111	1
USA	Jennifer Brady	112	2
USA	Grace Min	132	3
USA	Sachia Vickery	156	4
USA	Jessica Pegula	165	5
SRB	Jovana Jakšić	178	6
CAN	Françoise Abanda	186	7
JPN	Mayo Hibi	209	8

- ^{1} Rankings are as of October 10, 2016

=== Other entrants ===
The following players received wildcards into the singles main draw:

- (Canada) Lauren Chypyha
- (Canada) Gabriela Dabrowski
- (Canada) Catherine Leduc
- (Canada) Vanessa Wong

The following players received entry from the qualifying draw:

- (Russia) Elena Bovina
- (United States) Danielle Collins
- (Canada) Charlotte Robillard-Millette
- (Canada) Katherine Sebov

The following player received entry by junior exempt:

- (Canada) Bianca Andreescu

== Champions ==
=== Singles ===
- (United States) Catherine Bellis def. (Canada) Bianca Andreescu, 6–4, 6–2

=== Doubles ===
- (Romania) Elena Bogdan / (Romania) Mihaela Buzărnescu def. (Canada) Bianca Andreescu / (Canada) Charlotte Robillard-Millette, 6–4, 6–7^{(4–7)}, [10–6]
