= 2016 Challenger Banque Nationale de Saguenay – Doubles =

Doubles
- 2016 Challenger Banque Nationale de Saguenay

Final
- Champions: (Romania) Elena Bogdan (Romania) Mihaela Buzărnescu
- Runners-up: (Canada) Bianca Andreescu (Canada) Charlotte Robillard-Millette
- Score: 6–4, 6–7^{(4–7)}, [10–6]

Events
Singles	Doubles
- Challenger de Saguenay

Mihaela Buzărnescu and Justyna Jegiołka were the defending champions, but Jegiołka decided not to participate this year.

Buzărnescu partnered with Elena Bogdan and successfully defended her title, defeating Bianca Andreescu and Charlotte Robillard-Millette 6–4, 6–7^{(4–7)}, [10–6] in the final.

== Seeds ==
1. (Romania) Elena Bogdan / (Romania) Mihaela Buzărnescu (champions)
2. (Austria) Pia König / (Germany) Anna Zaja (semifinals)
3. (Germany) Laura Schaeder / (United States) Jessica Wacnik (quarterfinals)
4. (United States) Julia Elbaba / (Serbia) Jovana Jakšić (quarterfinals)

== Draw ==
Key

- Q = Qualifier
- WC = Wild card
- LL = Lucky loser
- Alt = Alternate
- ITF = ITF entry
- PR = Protected ranking
- SR = Special ranking
- SE = Special exempt
- JE = Junior exempt
- JR = Junior Accelerator Programme entrant
- CO = College Accelerator Programme entrant
- NG = Next Gen Accelerator Program entrant
- w/o = Walkover
- r = Retired
- d = Defaulted

First round
1	(Romania) E Bogdan (Romania) M Buzărnescu	6	6
(Russia) E Bovina (Canada) K Sebov	2	1
(Canada) L Chypyha (Canada) C Leduc	3	3
(Samoa) S Carruthers (United States) J Ho	6	6
3	(Germany) L Schaeder (United States) J Wacnik	4	6	[10]
(United States) B Boren (Hungary) N Totka	6	4	[7]
(Canada) I Boulais (United States) J Pegula	6	6
(United States) A Okuda (Canada) S Peterson-Paul	3	3
(Japan) M Hibi (Japan) M Osaka	1	2
(Canada) B Andreescu (Canada) C Robillard-Millette	6	6
(Canada) L Sleeth (Canada) V Wong	3	2
4	(United States) J Elbaba (Serbia) J Jakšić	6	6
(Poland) K Kubicz (Trinidad and Tobago) Y Leacock	6	6
(United States) G Leake (Canada) T Susen	4	3
(Canada) A-S Courteau (Canada) S Dynka	2	0
2	(Austria) P König (Germany) A Zaja	6	6

Quarterfinals
1	(Romania) E Bogdan (Romania) M Buzărnescu	6	6
(Samoa) S Carruthers (United States) J Ho	4	4
3	(Germany) L Schaeder (United States) J Wacnik	6	4	[12]
(Canada) I Boulais (United States) J Pegula	3	6	[14]
(Canada) B Andreescu (Canada) C Robillard-Millette	7^{7}	2	[10]
4	(United States) J Elbaba (Serbia) J Jakšić	6^{0}	6	[3]
(Poland) K Kubicz (Trinidad and Tobago) Y Leacock	3	0
2	(Austria) P König (Germany) A Zaja	6	6

Semifinals
1	(Romania) E Bogdan (Romania) M Buzărnescu	6	6
(Canada) I Boulais (United States) J Pegula	4	3
(Canada) B Andreescu (Canada) C Robillard-Millette	6	6
2	(Austria) P König (Germany) A Zaja	4	4

Final
1	(Romania) E Bogdan (Romania) M Buzărnescu	6	6^{4}	[10]
(Canada) B Andreescu (Canada) C Robillard-Millette	4	7^{7}	[6]
