= 2012 Challenger Banque Nationale de Saguenay – Singles =

Singles
- 2012 Challenger Banque Nationale de Saguenay

Final
- Champion: (United States) Madison Keys
- Runner-up: (Canada) Eugenie Bouchard
- Score: 6–4, 6–2

Events
Singles	Doubles
- Challenger de Saguenay

Tímea Babos was the defending champion, but chose not to participate.

Madison Keys won the title defeating Eugenie Bouchard in the final 6–4, 6–2.

== Seeds ==
1. (United States) Melanie Oudin (semifinals)
2. (United States) Irina Falconi (withdrew)
3. (Canada) Heidi El Tabakh (withdrew)
4. (United States) Maria Sanchez (second round)
5. (United States) Jessica Pegula (second round)
6. (Canada) Eugenie Bouchard (final)
7. (United States) Madison Keys (champion)
8. (Canada) Marie-Ève Pelletier (first round)

== Main draw ==
Key

- Q = Qualifier
- WC = Wild card
- LL = Lucky loser
- Alt = Alternate
- ITF = ITF entry
- PR = Protected ranking
- SR = Special ranking
- SE = Special exempt
- JE = Junior exempt
- JR = Junior Accelerator Programme entrant
- CO = College Accelerator Programme entrant
- NG = Next Gen Accelerator Program entrant
- w/o = Walkover
- r = Retired
- d = Defaulted

=== Finals ===
Semifinals
1	(United States) Melanie Oudin	2	2
6	(Canada) Eugenie Bouchard	6	6
(Russia) Alla Kudryavtseva	6	3	4
7	(United States) Madison Keys	4	6	6

Final
6	(Canada) Eugenie Bouchard	4	2
7	(United States) Madison Keys	6	6

=== Top half ===
First round
1	(United States) M Oudin	7	6
WC	(Canada) E Routliffe	5	2
(United States) J Elie	6	6
(United States) A Kiick	4	0
(Slovakia) M Hončová	3	6	7^{7}
(Canada) G Dabrowski	6	3	6^{3}
(United Kingdom) S Murray	6	6
8	(Canada) M-È Pelletier	3	4
LL	(Canada) F Abanda	6	6
Q	(United States) A Mueller	1	3
(United States) A Will	3	0
(Canada) S Fichman	6	6
WC	(Canada) C Petrick	1	2
(United States) S Crawford	6	6
(United States) J Boserup	4	4
6	(Canada) E Bouchard	6	6

Second round
1	(United States) M Oudin	6	6^{3}	6
(United States) J Elie	3	7^{7}	2
(Slovakia) M Hončová	2	4
(United Kingdom) S Murray	6	6
LL	(Canada) F Abanda	4	2
(Canada) S Fichman	6	6
(United States) S Crawford	2	2
6	(Canada) E Bouchard	6	6

Quarterfinals
1	(United States) M Oudin	6	6
(United Kingdom) S Murray	2	2
(Canada) S Fichman	3	3
6	(Canada) E Bouchard	6	6

Semifinals
1	(United States) M Oudin	2	2
6	(Canada) E Bouchard	6	6

=== Bottom half ===
First round
5	(United States) J Pegula	6	6
WC	(Canada) C Zhao	1	2
Q	(Finland) P Suomalainen	2	2
(Russia) A Kudryavtseva	6	6
(United States) S Vickery	2	7	6
Q	(United States) J Abaza	6	5	2
WC	(Canada) R Marino	6^{5}	6^{6}
4	(United States) M Sanchez	7^{7}	7^{8}
7	(United States) M Keys	7^{7}	6
(United States) L Litvak	6^{5}	2
(Poland) J Jegiołka	4	5
Q	(United States) V Duval	6	7
(France) V Larrière	6	6
(Germany) K Wörle	2	2
(Austria) N Rottmann	6	6
LL	(United States) M Harkins	2	2

Second round
5	(United States) J Pegula	3	6^{3}
(Russia) A Kudryavtseva	6	7^{7}
(United States) S Vickery	6	5	6
4	(United States) M Sanchez	4	7	3
7	(United States) M Keys	6	6
Q	(United States) V Duval	4	2
(France) V Larrière	6	3	6^{5}
(Austria) N Rottmann	4	6	7^{7}

Quarterfinals
(Russia) A Kudryavtseva	3	6	6
(United States) S Vickery	6	3	1
7	(United States) M Keys	6	6
(Austria) N Rottmann	0	4

Semifinals
(Russia) A Kudryavtseva	6	3	4
7	(United States) M Keys	4	6	6
