= 2012 Challenger Banque Nationale de Saguenay =

- Date: October 22 – October 28
- Edition: 7th
- Category: ITF Women's Circuit
- Prize money: US$50,000
- Surface: Hard – indoors
- Location: Saguenay, Quebec, Canada
- Venue: Club de tennis intérieur Saguenay

Champions

Singles
- (United States) Madison Keys

Doubles
- (Canada) Gabriela Dabrowski / (Russia) Alla Kudryavtseva
← 2011 ·	Challenger de Saguenay	· 2013 →

The 2012 Challenger Banque Nationale de Saguenay was a professional tennis tournament played on indoor hard courts. It was the 7th edition of the tournament and part of the 2012 ITF Women's Circuit, offering a total of $50,000 in prize money. It took place in Saguenay, Quebec, Canada between October 22 and October 28, 2012.

== Singles main-draw entrants ==
=== Seeds ===
Country	Player	Rank^{1}	Seed
USA	Melanie Oudin	98	1
USA	Irina Falconi	143	2
CAN	Heidi El Tabakh	149	3
USA	Maria Sanchez	151	4
USA	Jessica Pegula	153	5
CAN	Eugenie Bouchard	167	6
USA	Madison Keys	171	7
CAN	Marie-Ève Pelletier	200	8

- ^{1} Rankings are as of October 15, 2012

=== Other entrants ===
The following players received wildcards into the singles main draw:

- (Canada) Rebecca Marino
- (Canada) Charlotte Petrick
- (Canada) Erin Routliffe
- (Canada) Carol Zhao

The following players received entry from the qualifying draw:

- (United States) Jan Abaza
- (United States) Victoria Duval
- (United States) Alexandra Mueller
- (Finland) Piia Suomalainen

The following players received entry as lucky losers:

- (United States) Macall Harkins
- (Canada) Françoise Abanda

== Champions ==
=== Singles ===
- (United States) Madison Keys def. (Canada) Eugenie Bouchard, 6–4, 6–2

=== Doubles ===
- (Canada) Gabriela Dabrowski / (Russia) Alla Kudryavtseva def. (Canada) Sharon Fichman / (Canada) Marie-Ève Pelletier, 6–2, 6–2
