= Bianca Andreescu =

Canadian tennis player (born 2000)

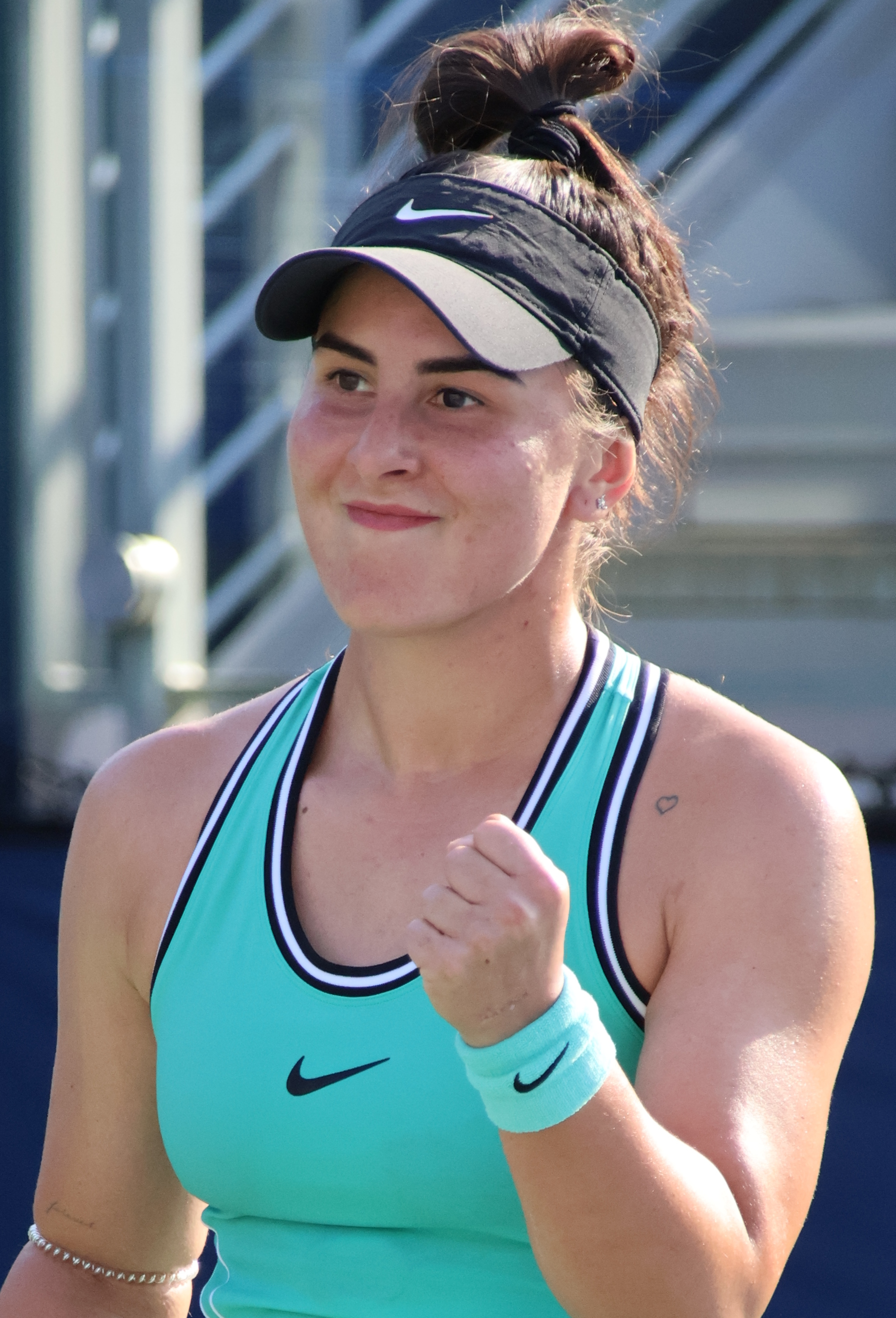
- Andreescu at the 2026 US Open
- Country (sports): Canada
- Residence: Thornhill, Ontario, Canada
- Born: June 16, 2000 (age 26) Mississauga, Ontario, Canada
- Height: 1.70 m (5 ft 7 in)
- Turned pro: 2017
- Plays: Right-handed (two-handed backhand)
- Coach: James Nishimura, Christophe Lambert (2023), Sven Groeneveld (2021–2022)
- Prize money: US$ 10,215,996

Singles
- Career record: 258–131
- Career titles: 3
- Highest ranking: No. 4 (October 21, 2019)
- Current ranking: No. 77 (November 16, 2026)

Grand Slam singles results
- Australian Open: 2R (2019, 2021, 2023)
- French Open: 3R (2023, 2024)
- Wimbledon: 3R (2023, 2024)
- US Open: W (2019)

Other tournaments
- Tour Finals: RR (2019)
- Olympic Games: 2R (2024)

Doubles
- Career record: 38–24
- Career titles: 0
- Highest ranking: No. 147 (July 16, 2018)
- Current ranking: No. 773 (November 16, 2026)

Grand Slam doubles results
- US Open: 1R (2019)

Grand Slam mixed doubles results
- French Open: F (2023)

Team competitions
- BJK Cup: RR (2022), record 11–4
- Hopman Cup: W (2025)
- Last updated on: November 16, 2026.

Bianca Vanessa Andreescu (/andreˈesku/; born June 16, 2000) is a Canadian professional tennis player. She has been ranked world No. 4 in women's singles by the WTA. Andreescu has won three WTA Tour–level singles titles: the 2019 Indian Wells Open, the 2019 Canadian Open, and a major title at the 2019 US Open. She is the first Canadian, male or female, to win a major singles title, (Note: Canadian-born Mary Pierce won two major singles titles while representing France.) and the first to win the Canadian Open in 50 years.

Andreescu began playing tennis in her parents' home country of Romania before returning to Canada, the country of her birth. She had success as a junior, winning the Orange Bowl and two major doubles titles with compatriot Carson Branstine en route to reaching a career-best junior ranking of No. 3 in the world. After not playing any matches at the WTA Tour level in 2018, Andreescu had a breakout year in 2019. She rose to prominence by winning the Indian Wells Open, and later swept the Canadian Open and US Open events, defeating Serena Williams in both finals, and finishing the year ranked world No. 5. However, in the years since she has struggled with injuries and inconsistent results.

Andreescu's style of play combines power with variety and has been widely regarded as "fun to watch" by tennis commentators and journalists.

== Early life and background ==
Bianca Vanessa Andreescu was born in Mississauga, Ontario to Nicu and Maria Andreescu. Her parents emigrated from Romania to Canada in 1994 when her father accepted a job in the country. Andreescu's father works as a mechanical engineer at an automotive company, while her mother had worked at a bank in Romania. Her family moved back to Romania when Bianca was six years old so that her mother could start a business in their home country. After two and a half years, they closed the business and returned to Canada. Her mother has since worked as the chief compliance officer at a financial services company. Andreescu began playing tennis in Pitești at the age of seven. She was initially coached by Gabriel Hristache, a friend of her father. When she returned to Canada, she trained at the Ontario Racquet Club in Mississauga before moving to the U14 National Training Centre in Toronto operated by Tennis Canada. She began training more seriously at the age of 12.

== Juniors ==
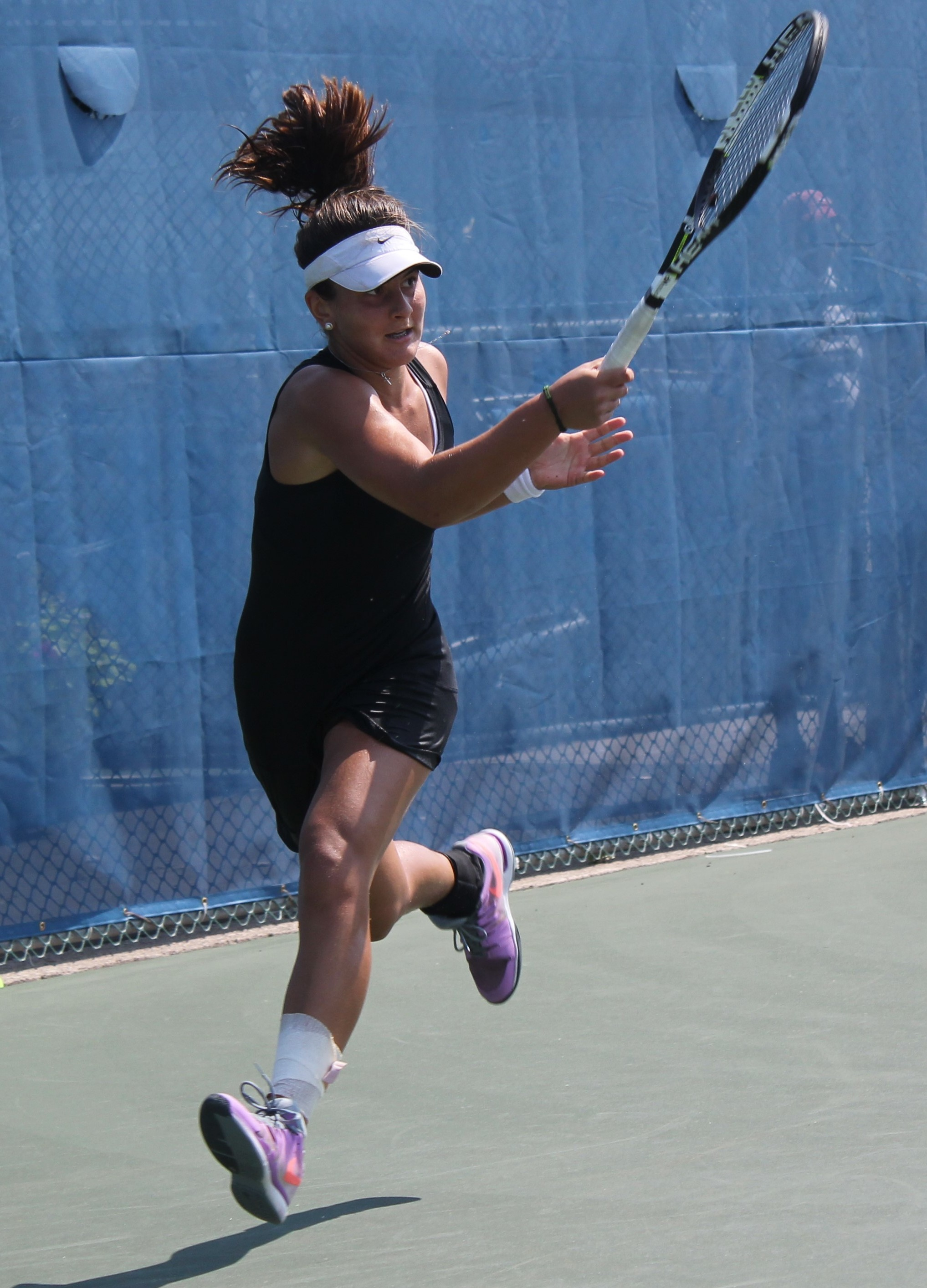
Andreescu in 2015

Andreescu had a career-high junior ranking of No. 3 in world, which she achieved in early 2016. She had early success as a junior, winning Les Petits As, a prestigious 14-and-under tournament, in 2014. She also won the 16-and-under Orange Bowl at the end of the year, becoming the fourth Canadian in a row to win that event. Andreescu began playing 18-and-under events on the ITF Junior Circuit in late 2013. She won her first titles in 2014, three in singles and one in doubles, at Grade-4 and Grade-5 tournaments, the two lowest levels.

Andreescu moved up to higher-level events in early 2015, winning both the singles and doubles titles at the Condor de Plata tournament in Bolivia, her first Grade-2 tournament. She finished runner-up to compatriot Charlotte Robillard-Millette at the Open International Junior de Beaulieu-sur-Mer, her first Grade-1 tournament. Andreescu had less immediate success at the highest-level Grade-A tournaments, losing her opening round matches at her first four such events, which included the last three major events of the year. Nonetheless, she defeated Robillard-Millette in their home country to win the Canadian Open Junior Championships during the summer, her first Grade 1 title. Late in the year, Andreescu reached both the singles and doubles final at the Yucatán Cup, finishing runner-up to Kayla Day in singles while winning her first doubles title at the Grade-1 level. At her last tournament of the year, Andreescu defeated Day to win the Orange Bowl, her first Grade-A title. She was the first player to win the girls' under-16 and under-18 titles in back-to-back years since Mary Joe Fernández in 1984 and 1985. During the season, Andreescu also represented Canada at the Junior Fed Cup with Robillard-Millette and Vanessa Wong. Andreescu and Robillard-Millette lost the decisive doubles rubber in the semifinals against the Czech Republic. However, they recovered to win both of their singles rubbers against Russia to take third place. Andreescu was named Outstanding Junior Female by Tennis Canada at the end of the year.

Andreescu had more success at the Grand Slam tournaments in 2016, but did not win any titles in singles or doubles at any level. As the top seed at the Australian Open in both singles and doubles, she withdrew from both events after two matches each because of recurring injuries involving her left adductor and right ankle, as well as a stress fracture in her foot. These injuries kept her out for six months. Andreescu returned to competition at Wimbledon, where she lost in the third round. At the US Open, she had her best run at a major event to date, reaching the semifinals in singles where she lost to Day. The last two junior events of Andreescu's career came in 2017 at the Grand Slam tournaments. She matched her best Grand Slam result in singles at the Australian Open, where she was defeated by Rebeka Masarova in the semifinals. She then made it to the quarterfinals of the French Open at her last singles event, losing to Claire Liu. Nonetheless, Andreescu won the major doubles titles at both of these tournaments with Carson Branstine. The pair defeated the Polish team of Maja Chwalińska and Iga Świątek in the Australian Open final, and the Russian pair of Olesya Pervushina and Anastasia Potapova in the French Open final. With their French Open title, Andreescu and Branstine became the first Canadian team to win a major girls' doubles title. (Note: Branstine represented the United States at the Australian Open and Canada at the French Open, having switched federations in-between the two tournaments.)

== Professional ==
=== 2015–18: ITF titles, WTA Tour doubles final ===
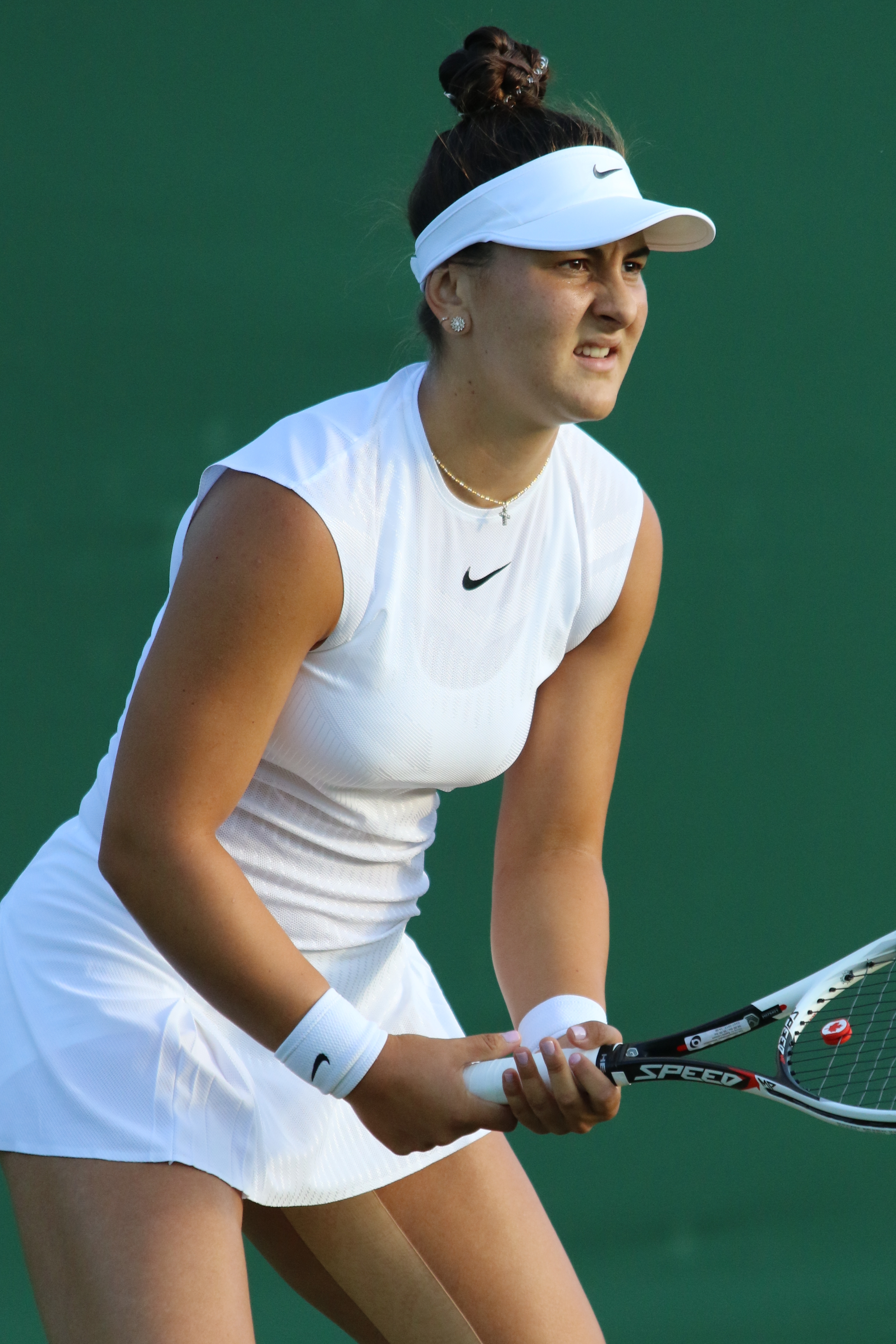
Andreescu at Wimbledon in 2017

Andreescu began playing on the ITF Circuit in July 2015. She finished runner-up to No. 155 Alexa Glatch in her professional tournament, a 25k event in Gatineau. She was given wildcards into qualifying at the Canadian Open in 2015 and 2016, but was unable to qualify. Andreescu missed most of the first half of 2016 due to injury. When she returned, she had success at ITF events in Canada. She won her first ITF titles in singles and doubles at the August 2016 event in Gatineau, winning the doubles with junior rival Robillard-Millette. In October, she finished runner-up in both the singles and doubles events at the higher-level 50k Challenger de Saguenay, again partnering with Robillard-Millette. During the singles event, she defeated No. 113 Jennifer Brady in a third-set tiebreak in the semifinals, before losing to No. 111, CiCi Bellis, in the final.

Andreescu won two more 25k titles in early 2017, which helped her break into the top 200 of the WTA rankings. After losing in qualifying at the French Open, she was able to qualify for the main draw at Wimbledon. She lost her Grand Slam debut to No. 105 Kristína Kučová. Later in the month, she was awarded a wildcard into the main draw of the Washington Open. She defeated Camila Giorgi in the opening round, her first win on the WTA Tour. In her next match, she upset world No. 13, Kristina Mladenovic, to advance to the quarterfinals, where she lost to Andrea Petkovic. A few weeks later, she made her Canadian Open main-draw debut as a wildcard entrant, losing to No. 55 Tímea Babos. Andreescu entered qualifying at the US Open, but lost her opening match. In the last stage of the season, she had more success in doubles. She reached her first WTA final in doubles with compatriot Carson Branstine at the Tournoi de Québec. They finished runners-up to top seeds Tímea Babos and Andrea Hlaváčková. She then partnered with compatriot Carol Zhao to win the doubles title at the $60k Challenger de Saguenay. Andreescu's best ranking during the year was No. 143, and she finished the season at No. 182.

Andreescu did not play any tour-level matches in 2018. She entered qualifying for all four majors, but did not qualify for any of them. She came the closest at the French Open and Wimbledon, falling one match short at both. Andreescu played primarily at the 25k level, reaching four finals. She had two runner-up finishes in April and two titles late in the season. One of her best results at higher-level events was a quarterfinal at the 100k Midland Tennis Classic. She also reached the semifinals of the 60k Challenger de Granby, where she withdrew due to a back injury. This injury kept her out of the Canadian Open. After attempting to qualify at the US Open, she did not return to competition until late October. Andreescu's two late-season titles helped her finish the year at No. 152 in the world.

=== 2019: US Open champion, world No. 4 ===
Despite entering the year having not played a WTA Tour match in over 14 months, Andreescu had a breakthrough season that took her from well outside the top 100 into the upper echelon of women's tennis. She began the season by qualifying for the main draw at the Auckland Open, where she made her first WTA Tour singles final. During the tournament, she upset top seed and world No. 3, Caroline Wozniacki, and defeated three top 40 players, before finishing runner-up to defending champion and second seed, Julia Görges. She also qualified for the Australian Open and won one match against Whitney Osuigwe, her first win in the main draw of a Grand Slam tournament. Before the end of the month, Andreescu won a WTA 125 title at the Newport Beach Challenger. With these three results, she rose from No. 152 at the start of the year to No. 107 after the Auckland runner-up, to No. 68 after the Australian Open and WTA 125 title, a large enough ascent to become Canada's top-ranked player on the tour.

Andreescu continued her hot streak with a semifinal at the Mexican Open. She then had an even larger breakthrough at the Premier Mandatory Indian Wells Open, where she won her first career title. Andreescu defeated four top 20 players in the last four rounds, including No. 6 Elina Svitolina and No. 8 Angelique Kerber in the semifinals and final, respectively, both in three sets. She became the first wildcard women's singles champion in tournament history and was the first 18-year-old to win the event since Serena Williams in 1999. This title also took her to No. 24 in the WTA rankings. Andreescu defeated Kerber again at the Miami Open a week later. However, she then suffered a right shoulder injury in the fourth round of the event that forced her to retire from the match. Andreescu's injury kept her out of all but one tournament until August. She attempted an early comeback at the French Open, but ultimately withdrew after one match. Andreescu made her next return at her home tournament, the Canadian Open, where she won her second high-level Premier tournament of the year. She won her first four matches in three sets, including the last two over top-ten opponents in No. 5 Kiki Bertens and No. 3 Karolína Plíšková. She defeated tenth seed Serena Williams in the final, who needed to retire due to back spasms down 1–3 in the first set. With these three top ten victories, Andreescu improved her record against top ten opponents to 7–0 to open her career. With the title, she moved up to No. 14 in the world. She also became the first Canadian to win the tournament since Faye Urban in 1969.

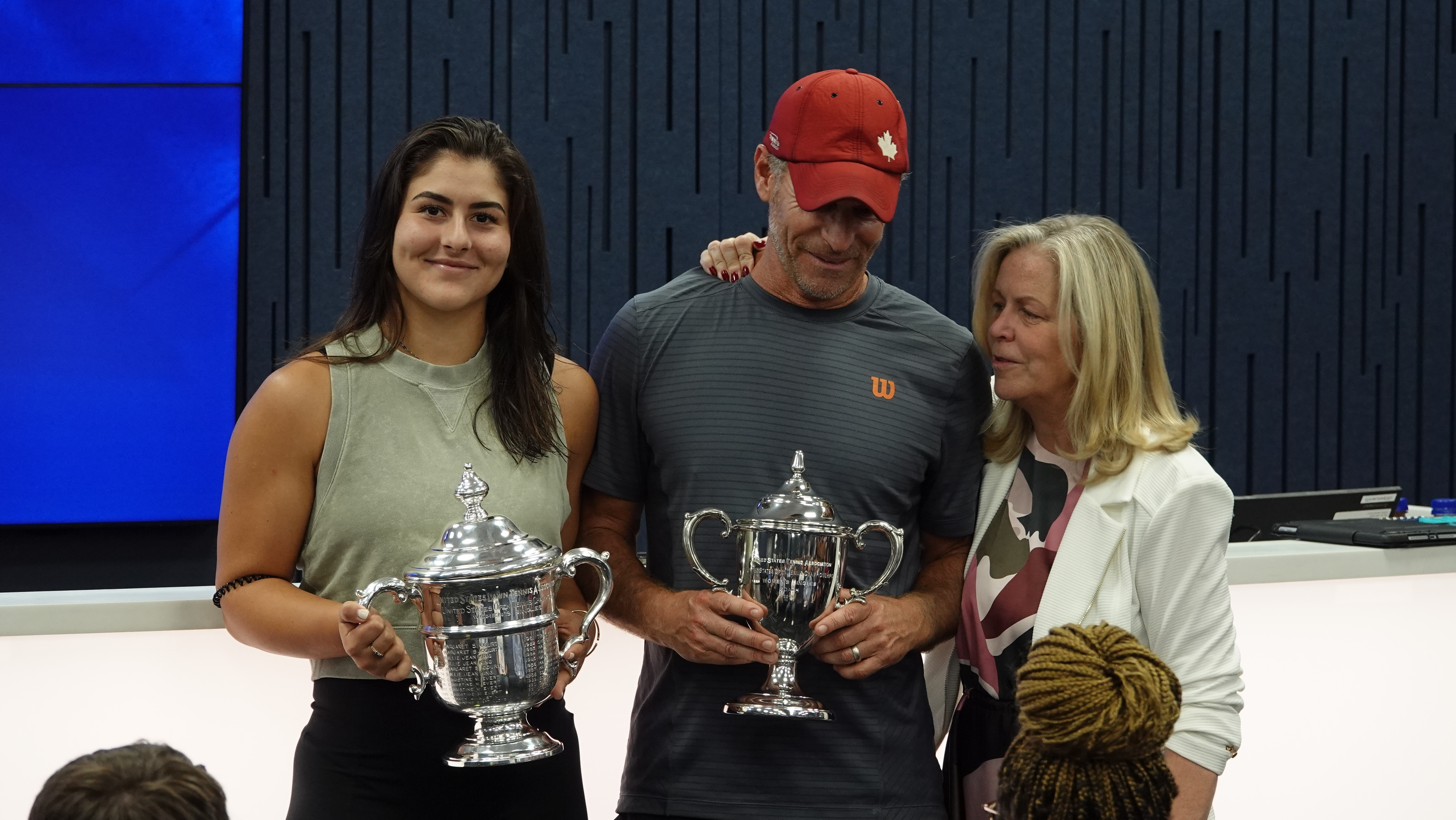
Bianca Andreescu poses with her coach, Sylvain Bruneau, and a USTA official following her press conference, after winning the 2019 US Open title at Arthur Ashe Stadium in Queens, New York.

Andreescu's best result of the year came at the US Open, where she won her first major title. She advanced to the final without facing a top-ten opponent, with her biggest wins coming against No. 19, Caroline Wozniacki, in the third round and No. 12 Belinda Bencic in the semifinals. Her opponent in the final was again Serena Williams. Andreescu defeated Williams in straight sets to win the title. She became the first Canadian tennis player to win a major singles title, and the first teenage major singles champion since Maria Sharapova won the 2006 US Open. She also became the first player to win the US Open in their main-draw debut, and was at the time tied with Monica Seles for being the quickest to win a major singles title by doing so in her fourth main-draw appearance, a record since broken by Emma Raducanu. She also rose to No. 5 in the world. Andreescu's 17-match win streak was ended in the quarterfinals of the China Open by No. 4 Naomi Osaka, which was also her first career loss against a top-ten opponent. She reached a career-high ranking of world No. 4 on 21 October, making her the highest ranked Canadian woman in the history of the WTA. She closed out the year at the WTA Finals, where she withdrew after two losses to Simona Halep and Plíšková due to a knee injury. At the end of the season, Andreescu was awarded the Lou Marsh Trophy as Canada's top athlete of the year. She was the first tennis player to win the award.

=== 2020–21: WTA 1000 final and injuries ===
Andreescu missed the first few months of the 2020 season, including the Australian Open, due to her knee injury. She was unable to defend her title at the Indian Wells Open until the tournament and the next several months of the season were canceled due to the COVID-19 pandemic.

Andreescu returned to competition for the first time in 15 months at the 2021 Australian Open, the first major tournament since her run at the 2019 US Open. Seeded eighth, she opened with a three-set victory over Mihaela Buzărnescu in the first round but then was upset by Hsieh Su-wei in straight sets. She also participated in the Phillip Island Trophy, another new event in Australia, where she lost in the semifinals to Marie Bouzková.

In late March, Andreescu participated in the Miami Open, again seeded eighth. Receiving a first round bye, she defeated Tereza Martincová in straight sets. Andreescu would go on to record three-set wins over Amanda Anisimova, Garbiñe Muguruza, Sara Sorribes Tormo, and Maria Sakkari to set up a clash with world No. 1, Ashleigh Barty, in the final. However, she was ultimately forced to retire due to an ankle injury, while trailing by a set and two breaks of serve.

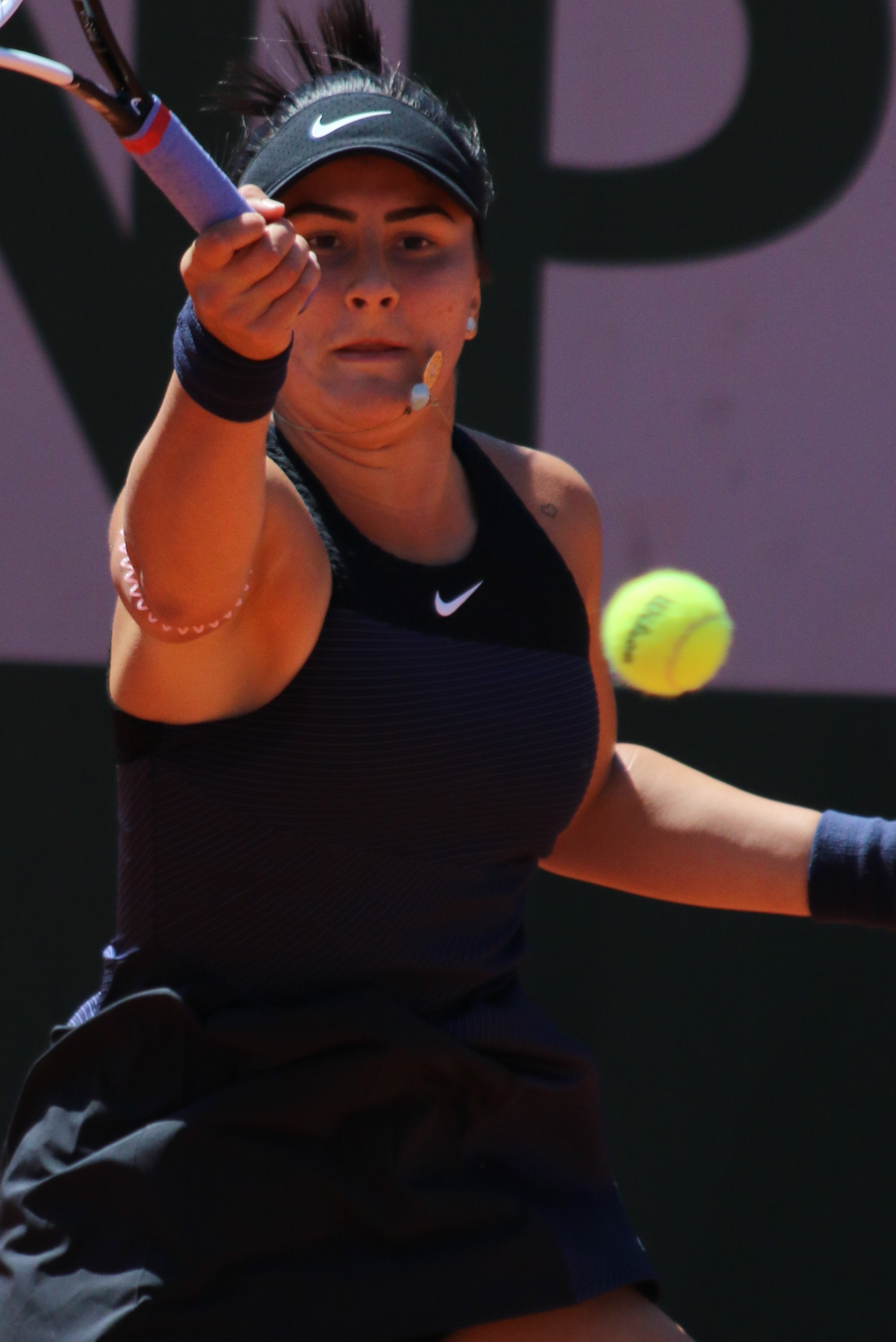
Andreescu at the 2021 French Open

Bianca tested positive for COVID-19 on April 25, 2021, and was forced to withdraw from the Madrid Open. She went into the French Open as the sixth seed, however she was upset in the first round by eventual semifinalist Tamara Zidanšek.

She went into the Wimbledon Championships as the fifth seed and was upset in the first round in straight sets, this time by Alizé Cornet. She then withdrew from the Tokyo Olympics and returned to action at the Canadian Open, as the defending champion. There, she lost to Ons Jabeur in the third round.

Seeded sixth at the US Open, she reached the fourth round but lost to Maria Sakkari in a three and a half hour battle that ended after 2AM, making it latest women's singles match in tournament history. Because she did not defend her 2019 title, she fell to No. 20 in the rankings. At Indian Wells, she was also the defending champion but lost in the third round to Anett Kontaveit. As a result, she finished the year at No. 46 in the singles rankings.

=== 2022: First grass court final ===
Andreescu missed many big tournaments in the first three months of 2022, including the Australian Open, Indian Wells, and the Miami Open due to her injury.

She made her comeback at Stuttgart as a wildcard entrant in April. However, she lost to Aryna Sabalenka in the round of 16. In her next event at the Madrid Open, she lost to Jessica Pegula in the round of 16, after defeating Alison Riske and world No. 8, Danielle Collins.

In Rome, she won her first-round match after Emma Raducanu retired because of a lower back injury. Then she defeated lucky loser Nuria Párrizas Díaz and qualifier Petra Martić to reach her first WTA 1000 quarterfinals since the 2021 Miami Open. She lost to world No. 1 and eventual champion, Iga Świątek.

At the French Open, she reached the second round defeating qualifier Ysaline Bonaventure, but lost in straight sets to Belinda Bencic.

In Berlin, Andreescu started her grass-court season, and participated in both disciplines. In singles, she played two tough matches against Czech players, beating Kateřina Siniaková in three sets,but losing in the second round to fourth seed Karolína Plíšková, in three sets. In doubles, Andreescu partnered Sabine Lisicki. They reached the semifinals but lost to top seeds Storm Sanders and Siniaková.

In Bad Homburg, Andreescu defeated seventh seed Martina Trevisan, Katie Swan and top seed Daria Kasatkina to reach her first grass court semifinal. She reached the final when Simona Halep withdrew from semifinals due to a neck injury, but lost the final to Caroline Garcia. She won her first match at Wimbledon defeating qualifier Emina Bektas in 55 minutes. In the second round, Andreescu lost to eventual champion Elena Rybakina, in straight sets.

At the Silicon Valley Classic, she lost to Shelby Rogers in two sets, although Andreescu was visibly struggling with a back injury throughout the match. At the Canadian Open, Andreescu reached the third round after defeating Alizé Cornet. In the third round, she lost to Zheng Qinwen in three sets. At the US Open, Andreescu lost in the third round to Caroline Garcia, in straight sets.

=== 2023: French mixed-doubles final, hiatus ===
In Miami, she reached the fourth round defeating Emma Raducanu, seventh seed Maria Sakkari for her first top-10 win for the season, and Sofia Kenin. She suffered an ankle injury in the fourth round against Ekaterina Alexandrova and had to be taken off the court in a wheelchair.

At the French Open, she reached the final in mixed doubles as alternate pair with Michael Venus with a win over compatriot Gabriela Dabrowski and American Nathaniel Lammons. In singles at the same tournament, she reached the third round but lost to Lesia Tsurenko, in straight sets. At Wimbledon, she reached the third round for the first time in her career, defeating Anna Bondár and 26th seed Anhelina Kalinina. In the third round, she fell to sixth seed Ons Jabeur.

=== 2024: French Open and Wimbledon third rounds ===
She returned to the WTA Tour, after nine months of hiatus at the 2024 French Open, where she entered using protected ranking, and reached the third round with wins over Sara Sorribes Tormo and 23rd seed Anna Kalinskaya before falling to eventual finalist Jasmine Paolini.

At the beginning of the grass-court season, competing as a wildcard at the Rosmalen Open, she also won two matches and reached her first grass quarterfinal since 2022, with wins over Dutch qualifier Eva Vedder, and sixth seed Yuan Yue. Next, she defeated fellow wildcard Naomi Osaka to reach her first WTA Tour semifinal since 2023 Hua Hin and her first on grass since 2022 in Bad Homburg. She reached the final defeating qualifier Dalma Galfi, before losing to second seed Liudmila Samsonova.

At Wimbledon, Andreescu defeated Jaqueline Cristian and 26th seed Linda Nosková, before losing in the third round to eventual tournament runner-up, Jasmine Paolini.

At the Paris Summer Olympics, Andreescu defeated Denmark's Clara Tauson in her opening match to reach the second round, where she fell to Croatia's eventual silver medalist Donna Vekić.

Andreescu lost to fifth seed Jasmine Paolini in the first round at the US Open, the third successive Grand Slam tournament that she had been knocked out by the Italian.

=== 2025: Catalonia doubles title, Italian Open fourth round ===
Andreescu missed the first three months of the 2025 season due to injury and illness including having emergency surgery to remove her appendix. She returned to competitive action in April at the Rouen Open, losing to Suzan Lamens in the first round.

At the Madrid Open, she defeated McCartney Kessler, before losing to 10th seed Elena Rybakina in the second round. The following week, Andreescu won the doubles title at the WTA 125 Catalonia Open, partnering Aldila Sutjiadi to defeat Leylah Fernandez and Lulu Sun in the final. At the Italian Open, Andreescu reached the fourth round, eventually losing to eighth seed Qinwen Zheng. En route, she defeated 11th seed Elena Rybakina in a rematch of their Madrid Open match two weeks prior.

Given a wildcard entry into the main-draw at the Libéma Open, Andreescu recorded wins over qualifier Joanna Garland and seventh seed Lulu Sun to make it through to the quarterfinals, at which point her run was ended by qualifier and eventual runner-up Elena-Gabriela Ruse. She lost in the second round of qualifying at Wimbledon to fellow Canadian Carson Branstine.

In July, Andreescu suffered an ankle injury on match point in her first round win over Barbora Krejčíková at the Canadian Open and subsequently withdrew from the tournament. The injury kept her out of action until the China Open at the end of September, where she entered using her protected ranking but lost to qualifier Anna Bondár in the first round. Andreescu also lost in the first round at the Japan Women's Open to Viktorija Golubic and the Pan Pacific Open to ninth seed Victoria Mboko.

=== 2026: Three WTA 125 titles, return to top 100 ===
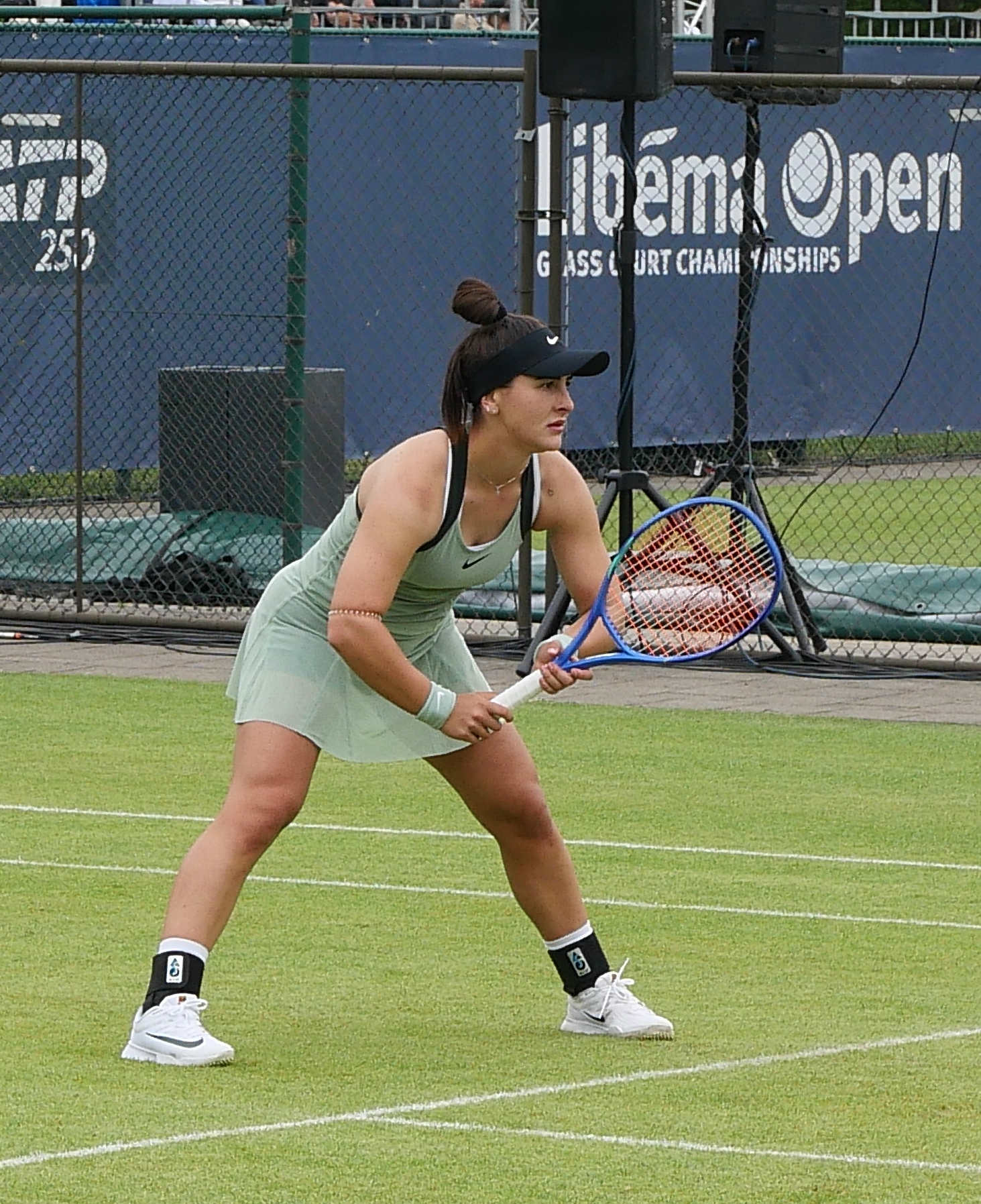
Aandreescu at the 2026 Libéma Open

Having started the 2026 season ranked at world No. 228, Andreescu spent January playing on the ITF Circuit, winning 13 of her 14 matches including claiming titles at Bradenton and Vero Beach.

Now back up to world No. 161, she returned to the WTA Tour at the end of February, making her first appearance at that level in four months at the ATX Open, where she was given a wildcard entry into the main-draw but lost to Dalma Gálfi in the opening round. Also playing in the main-draw courtesy of a wildcard at Indian Wells, Andreescu lost in the first round to qualifier Kamilla Rakhimova in three sets. The following week she reached the final at the WTA 125 Austin Challenger, but lost to Lanlana Tararudee in three sets.

Entering as a wildcard at the Charleston Open, Andreescu won her first WTA Tour main-draw match in eight months when she defeated Dalma Gálfi in three sets in the opening round. She lost in the second round to 16th seed Sofia Kenin. Benefitting from another wildcard, Andreescu entered the main-draw at the Italian Open and overcame Sofia Kenin to reach the second round, where she lost to 12th seed Belinda Bencic.

In June, Andreescu qualified for Wimbledon to make her first main-draw appearance at a major since the 2024 US Open. She lost in the first round to Zhang Shuai in two tiebreak sets.

Given a wildcard entry into the main-draw at the Canadian Open, Andreescu lost to Nikola Bartůňková in the first round. She made it into the third qualifying round at the US Open, but was eliminated by Tamara Zidanšek after letting slip a lead of a set and a break of serve.

In October at the WTA 125 Rovereto Open, Andreescu won her highest level singles title since her 2019 US Open triumph, defeating sixth seed Dominika Šalková in the final. Two weeks later in her next tournament, she made it back-to-back WTA 125 titles by winning the Querétaro Open, defeating top seed Tatjana Maria in the final. The following week she reached the final at the Cali Open, but lost to Leyre Romero Gormaz, bringing an end to her 14 match winning run. Despite her defeat, Andreescu moved up to world No. 100 on 9 November 2026, the first time she had been in the top 100 of the WTA singles rankings since June 2025. At the Cundinamarca Open, she won her third WTA 125 title in the space of six weeks, defeating Elizabeth Mandlik in the final. As a result, Andreescu climbed 23 spots in the WTA singles rankings to world No. 77 on 16 November 2026, which represented her highest position since October 2023.

== National representation ==
Having led Canada to third and fifth places at the Junior Fed Cup in 2015 and 2016 respectively, Andreescu made her senior Fed Cup debut in 2017 when Canada was in the third-tier Americas Zone Group I. In this group, they needed to finish first in their round robin pool, win a tie against the other round robin pool winner, and then win another tie in the play-off round to get promoted to the second tier the following year. Canada achieved all three of those objectives in 2017. They first swept their round robin pool of Paraguay, Bolivia, and Venezuela, with Andreescu winning all five of her rubbers without dropping a set. Canada then defeated Chile, the winners of the other round robin pool, as Katherine Sebov and Andreescu won the two singles rubbers to clinch the tie. In the World Group II play-offs, Canada faced Kazakhstan. Andreescu and Françoise Abanda were selected to play singles. After Andreescu lost her opening singles rubber to No. 31 Yulia Putintseva, Abanda won both of her singles rubbers. Andreescu then clinched the tie for Canada with a win against No. 51 Yaroslava Shvedova, the highest-ranked player she defeated to date. As a result, Canada earned promotion to World Group II in 2018.

Canada were drawn against Romania in the 2018 World Group II. They lost the first three singles rubbers and the tie, with Andreescu losing the second rubber to No. 37 Irina-Camelia Begu. Canada faced Ukraine in the World Group II play-offs. Although Andreescu lost her only singles rubber to No. 40 Lesia Tsurenko, Eugenie Bouchard won both of her singles rubbers to help set up a decisive doubles rubber. Andreescu and Gabriela Dabrowski won the doubles match in three sets over Kateryna Bondarenko and Olga Savchuk to clinch the tie for Canada and keep them in World Group II for the following year. In 2019, Andreescu won both of her singles rubbers as Canada swept the Netherlands 4–0 to advance to the World Group play-offs. Due to a shoulder injury, she missed the next tie against Czech Republic. Although Canada were swept 0–4 in this tie, the change in the Fed Cup format announced a few months after the tie allowed them to advance to the qualifying round for the top-tier Fed Cup Finals in 2020.

== Playing style ==
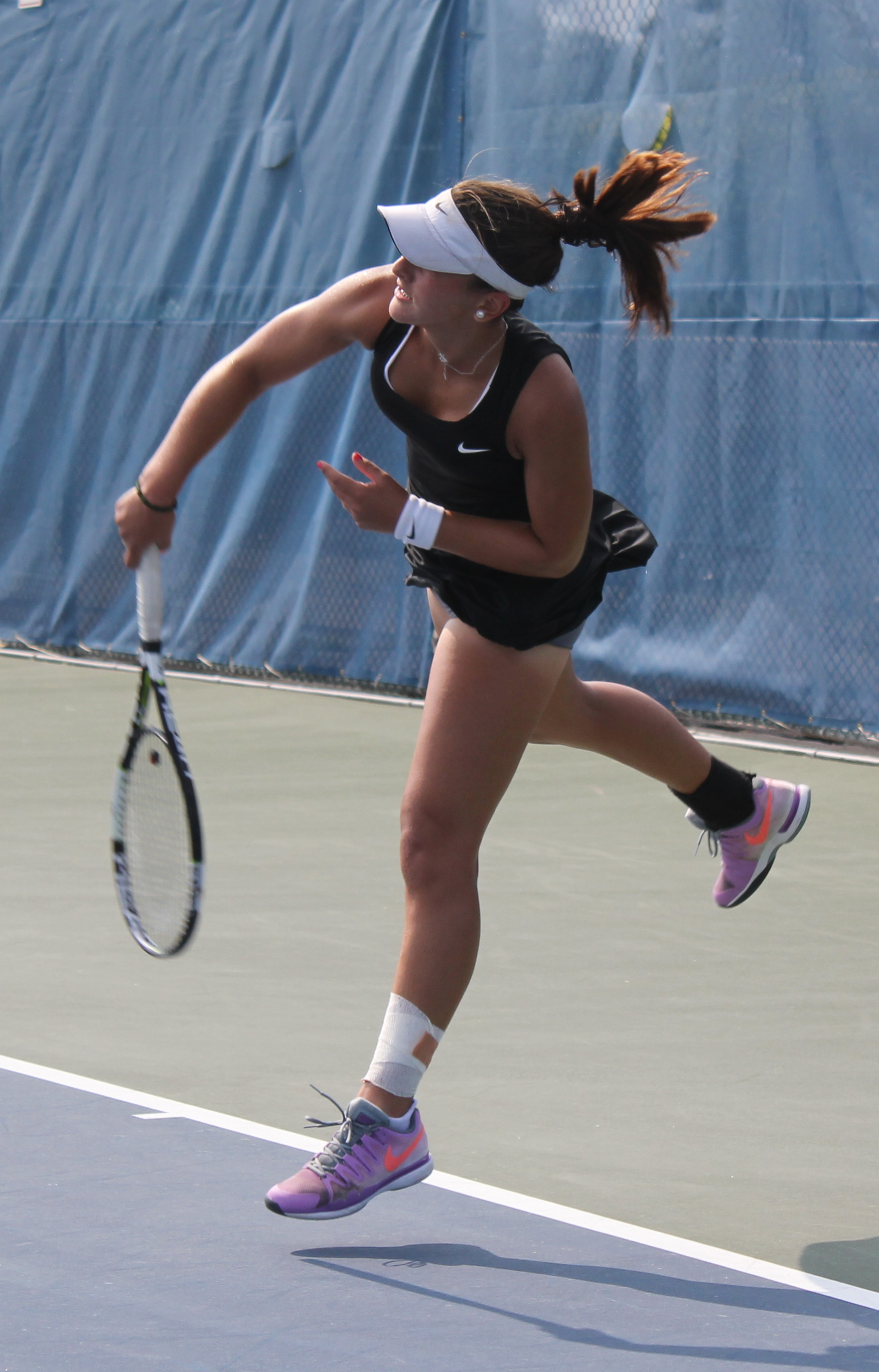
Andreescu serving

Andreescu employs a wide variety of shots into her style of play that is set apart by the level of power she incorporates into her game. Martina Navratilova in particular has noted, "Everyone knows how to bang the ball; it's when you bring something extra to the table that it makes all the difference, and Andreescu brings a lot of extra to the table. Think the variety (almost) of [former world No. 1] Martina Hingis, but with more power." One of the keys is to her style of play is having good shot selection, which she excelled at in particular when she won her first career WTA title at the 2019 Indian Wells Open. She rarely hits two shots in a row in the same way, and her opponents can find it difficult to read her shots. The power and variety in her style have received wide praise as both entertaining and effective. Former world No. 1 Tracy Austin, Sportsnet Canada, and The Wall Street Journal all have stated she is "fun to watch". Gerald Marzorati of The New Yorker declared, "For me, this kind of play is tennis."

Andreescu has multiple options with her forehand, including hitting it flat, with slice, or with heavy topspin to push her opponents further back behind the baseline. She also has multiple options with her two-handed backhand, and is capable of hitting it flat at sharp angles, with power, or one-handed with slice. Andreescu can hit large numbers of winners, most of which are typically from the forehand side. She hit 19 winners in the 2019 US Open final and 44 in the 2019 Indian Wells final, 37 of which were forehand winners. Andreescu frequently incorporates well-disguised drop shots to change pace and keep her opponents out of rhythm. She also can hit moonballs on occasion for the same purpose. Following a loss to Andreescu at the 2019 US Open, Caroline Wozniacki likened her style to that of Kim Clijsters, one of Andreescu's childhood tennis idols, saying "I think because [Andreescu] moves well and she can stretch out and get to some balls and also play the aggressive and using the angles. Obviously she prefers the forehand just like Kim... But she can move around the backhand and put the angle on it."

== Coaches ==
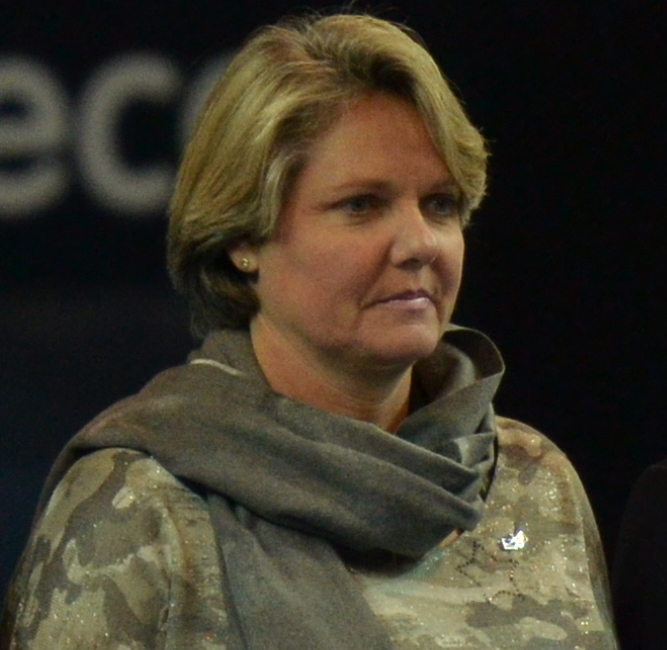
Nathalie Tauziat, one of Andreescu's junior coaches

Andreescu began playing tennis under Gabriel Hristache in Romania. When training with Tennis Canada at the U14 National Training Centre, she worked with Lan Yao-Gallop for two years starting at the age of twelve. Yao-Gallop, who played professionally for five years, remarked that Andreescu always played with power, but initially lacked control. Andreescu also worked with Aref Jallali at this time. Later on at the age of fourteen, she was coached by Nathalie Tauziat and André Labelle, both of whom also worked with Tennis Canada. Tauziat is a former French professional player who was ranked as high as No. 3 in the world and finished runner-up at Wimbledon in 1998. She served as Andreescu's primary coach at the time and focused on having her improve at taking the ball early, which Andreescu viewed as having an immediate impact on her success as a junior player. Labelle travelled from Montreal to Toronto so that Andreescu did not need to leave home to train. In March 2018, Andreescu switched from Tauziat to Sylvain Bruneau, another Tennis Canada coach, so that she could have a full-time traveling coach. In 2024, Andreescu appointed her hitting partner of three years, J.T. Nishimura, as coach.

== Personal life ==
Andreescu is supported by both Canadian and Romanian fans due to her Romanian heritage. She has said, "I've definitely got a lot of love from all the Romanian media, which is nice. It's nice to have two fan bases, Canada and Romania". Andreescu lived in Romania for two and a half years as a child. She speaks fluent Romanian, and she travels with her parents back to Romania annually to visit the rest of her family. She was raised in part by her Romanian grandparents. Andreescu has stated she did not have a favorite tennis player while growing up. However, Simona Halep has been her favorite player at times due to the two having a similar style of play and also because she is Romanian. Andreescu has said she tried to model her game after that of Halep. She first met Halep at the 2016 Canadian Open, where Halep advised her to turn professional. Andreescu also stated she looked up to Kim Clijsters and the Williams sisters.

She has been regularly practicing a form of meditation called creative visualization since she was 12 years old. She also practices yoga. She has said, "I don't only work on my physical aspect. I also work on the mental, because that's also very, very important. It's definitely showing through my matches where I'm staying in the present moment a lot of the time. I don't like to focus on what just happened or in the future." While she used to practice creative visualization for a few hours a day, she has since limited this type of meditation to 15 minutes per day due to her busy schedule. Andreescu's former coach Aref Jallali credited her mental fortitude to her mother, while another of her former coaches attributed her ability to manage stress to her father.

Bianca is nicknamed Bibi. Her middle name of Vanessa was inspired by American actress and singer Vanessa Williams.

Bianca's dog Coco, a Poodle, is an occasional addition to her box. During her US Open success, Coco was allowed into the venue.

== Career statistics ==
=== Grand Slam singles performance timeline ===
Key
W	F	SF	QF	#R	RR	Q#	DNQ	A	NH

(W) winner; (F) finalist; (SF) semifinalist; (QF) quarterfinalist; (#R) rounds 4, 3, 2, 1; (RR) round-robin stage; (Q#) qualification round; (DNQ) did not qualify; (A) absent; (NH) not held; (SR) strike rate (events won / competed); (W–L) win–loss record.
To avoid confusion and double counting, these charts are updated at the conclusion of a tournament or when the player's participation has ended.

Tournament	2017	2018	2019	2020	2021	2022	2023	2024	2025	2026	SR	W–L	Win %
Australian Open	A	Q1	2R	A	2R	A	2R	A	A	A	0 / 3	3–3	50%
French Open	Q1	Q3	2R	A	1R	2R	3R	3R	Q2	Q2	0 / 5	6–4	60%
Wimbledon	1R	Q3	A	NH	1R	2R	3R	3R	Q2	1R	0 / 6	5–6	45%
US Open	Q1	Q1	W	A	4R	3R	A	1R	A	Q3	1 / 4	12–3	80%
Win–loss	0–1	0–0	9–1	0–0	4–4	4–3	5–3	4–3	0–0	0–1	1 / 18	26–16	62%

=== Grand Slam tournament finals ===
==== Singles: 1 (title) ====
Result	Year	Championship	Surface	Opponent	Score
Win	2019	US Open	Hard	(United States) Serena Williams	6–3, 7–5

==== Mixed doubles: 1 (runner-up) ====
Result	Year	Championship	Surface	Partner	Opponents	Score
Loss	2023	French Open	Clay	(New Zealand) Michael Venus	(Japan) Miyu Kato (Germany) Tim Pütz	6–4, 4–6, [6–10]

=== Open era records ===
Tournament	Year	Record accomplished	Player tied	Ref
US Open	2019	Singles title in first US Open main-draw appearance	Emma Raducanu	

== Awards ==
WTA awards

- WTA Newcomer of the Year – 2019

ITF awards

- Fed Cup Heart Award – 2017

Tennis Canada awards

- Outstanding Junior Female – 2015, 2016
- Female Player of the Year – 2017

Canadian Sport awards

- Lou Marsh Trophy (Canada's top athlete) – 2019
- Bobbie Rosenfeld Award (Canada's female athlete of the year) – 2019
- Performance of the Year – 2019
- Female Summer Athlete of the Year – 2019

== See also ==
- List of Canadian sports personalities

== Notes ==
Sporting positions
Preceded by (Canada) Charlotte Robillard-Millette	Orange Bowl Girls' Singles Champion; Category: 14 and under 2014	Succeeded by (Argentina) María Lourdes Carlé
Preceded by (United States) Sofia Kenin	Orange Bowl Girls' Singles Champion; Category: 18 and under 2015	Succeeded by (Slovenia) Kaja Juvan
