= 2014 Challenger Banque Nationale de Saguenay – Doubles =

Doubles
- 2014 Challenger Banque Nationale de Saguenay

Final
- Champions: (Belgium) Ysaline Bonaventure (United Kingdom) Nicola Slater
- Runners-up: (Canada) Sonja Molnar (United States) Caitlin Whoriskey
- Score: 6–4, 6–4

Events
Singles	Doubles
- Challenger de Saguenay

Marta Domachowska and Andrea Hlaváčková were the defending champions, but Domachowska chose not to participate, whilst Hlaváčková chose to participate in Poitiers instead.

The top seeds Ysaline Bonaventure and Nicola Slater won the title, defeating Sonja Molnar and Caitlin Whoriskey in the final, 6–4, 6–4.

== Seeds ==
1. (Belgium) Ysaline Bonaventure / (United Kingdom) Nicola Slater (champions)
2. (United States) Anamika Bhargava / (United Kingdom) Emily Webley-Smith (first round)
3. (Belgium) An-Sophie Mestach / (Liechtenstein) Stephanie Vogt (semifinals)
4. (Netherlands) Cindy Burger / (Poland) Justyna Jegiołka (quarterfinals)

== Draw ==
Key

- Q = Qualifier
- WC = Wild card
- LL = Lucky loser
- Alt = Alternate
- ITF = ITF entry
- PR = Protected ranking
- SR = Special ranking
- SE = Special exempt
- JE = Junior exempt
- JR = Junior Accelerator Programme entrant
- CO = College Accelerator Programme entrant
- NG = Next Gen Accelerator Program entrant
- w/o = Walkover
- r = Retired
- d = Defaulted

First round
1	(Belgium) Y Bonaventure (United Kingdom) N Slater	7^{7}	6
(Russia) E Bovina (Russia) V Savinykh	6^{5}	2
(United States) E Harman (United States) M Kobelt	4	6	[10]
(United States) D Mills (Australia) K Wlodarczak	6	3	[5]
4	(Netherlands) C Burger (Poland) J Jegiołka	6	7^{7}
(Germany) K Grajdek (Germany) N Zander	4	6^{5}
(Canada) R Johanson (Canada) M Patrascu	2	4
(Israel) J Glushko (Serbia) J Jakšić	6	6
(France) J Coin (France) C Sibille	7^{7}	1	[6]
(Canada) M-A Leduc (Canada) C Robillard-Millette	6^{1}	6	[10]
(United States) E Clark (Canada) P Januskova	2	2
3	(Belgium) A-S Mestach (Liechtenstein) S Vogt	6	6
(Canada) A Broomfield (United States) T Sadler	6	6
(United States) A Morozova (United States) A Riley	4	3
(Canada) S Molnar (United States) C Whoriskey	6	7
2	(United States) A Bhargava (United Kingdom) E Webley-Smith	2	5

Quarterfinals
1	(Belgium) Y Bonaventure (United Kingdom) N Slater	6	4	[10]
(United States) E Harman (United States) M Kobelt	1	6	[8]
4	(Netherlands) C Burger (Poland) J Jegiołka	5	6	[7]
(Israel) J Glushko (Serbia) J Jakšić	7	1	[10]
(Canada) M-A Leduc (Canada) C Robillard-Millette	6^{1}	1
3	(Belgium) A-S Mestach (Liechtenstein) S Vogt	7^{7}	6
(Canada) A Broomfield (United States) T Sadler	0	1
(Canada) S Molnar (United States) C Whoriskey	6	6

Semifinals
1	(Belgium) Y Bonaventure (United Kingdom) N Slater	7^{9}	6^{6}	[13]
(Israel) J Glushko (Serbia) J Jakšić	6^{7}	7^{8}	[11]
3	(Belgium) A-S Mestach (Liechtenstein) S Vogt	2	1
(Canada) S Molnar (United States) C Whoriskey	6	6

Final
1	(Belgium) Y Bonaventure (United Kingdom) N Slater	6	6
(Canada) S Molnar (United States) C Whoriskey	4	4
