= 2014 Challenger Banque Nationale de Saguenay =

- Date: October 20–26
- Edition: 9th
- Category: ITF Women's Circuit
- Prize money: US$50,000
- Surface: Hard – indoors
- Location: Saguenay, Quebec, Canada
- Venue: Club de tennis intérieur Saguenay

Champions

Singles
- (France) Julie Coin

Doubles
- (Belgium) Ysaline Bonaventure / (United Kingdom) Nicola Slater
- Challenger de Saguenay

The 2014 Challenger Banque Nationale de Saguenay was a professional tennis tournament played on indoor hard courts. It was the 9th edition of the tournament and part of the 2014 ITF Women's Circuit, offering a total of $50,000 in prize money. It took place in Saguenay, Quebec, Canada between October 20 and October 26, 2014.

== Singles main-draw entrants ==
=== Seeds ===
Country	Player	Rank^{1}	Seed
USA	Taylor Townsend	104	1
SRB	Jovana Jakšić	121	2
SUI	Romina Oprandi	122	3
BEL	An-Sophie Mestach	139	4
ISR	Julia Glushko	159	5
CAN	Françoise Abanda	180	6
JPN	Miharu Imanishi	203	7
LIE	Stephanie Vogt	215	8

- ^{1} Rankings are as of October 13, 2014

=== Other entrants ===
The following players received wildcards into the singles main draw:

- (Canada) Petra Januskova
- (Canada) Marie-Alexandre Leduc
- (Canada) Maria Patrascu
- (Canada) Charlotte Robillard-Millette

The following players received entry from the qualifying draw:

- (Canada) Ayan Broomfield
- (United States) Nadja Gilchrist
- (Germany) Kim Grajdek
- (Canada) Rosie Johanson

The following player received entry as a lucky loser:

- (United States) Lauren Albanese

== Champions ==
=== Singles ===
- (France) Julie Coin def. (Serbia) Jovana Jakšić, 7–5, 6–3

=== Doubles ===
- (Belgium) Ysaline Bonaventure / (United Kingdom) Nicola Slater def. (Canada) Sonja Molnar / (United States) Caitlin Whoriskey, 6–4, 6–4
