= Sonja Molnar =

Canadian tennis player

Sonja Molnar-Palmer
- Country (sports): Canada
- Residence: Guelph, Ontario, Canada
- Born: April 29, 1990 (age 35) Brampton, Ontario
- Height: 1.65 m (5 ft 5 in)
- Turned pro: 2012
- Retired: 2015
- Plays: Right (two-handed backhand)
- College: Iowa Hawkeyes
- Prize money: $28,639

Singles
- Career record: 68–62
- Career titles: 3 ITF
- Highest ranking: No. 488 (January 6, 2014)

Doubles
- Career record: 44–48
- Career titles: 1 ITF
- Highest ranking: No. 274 (October 27, 2014)

Sonja Molnar-Palmer (born April 29, 1990) is a Canadian former professional tennis player. She reached a career- high singles ranking of 488 by the WTA in January 2014. She played for the Iowa Hawkeyes from 2009 to 2012 and turned professional after. Molnar played her last match in August 2015 at the Challenger de Gatineau.

== Tennis career ==
=== 2008–12 ===
Molnar made her debut in July 2008 at the $25k event in Waterloo, reaching the second round in singles and the quarterfinals in doubles. Molnar decided to go to College instead of turning professional in 2009 and was a four-time All-Big Ten performer for the Iowa Hawkeyes until 2012. She was also named Big Ten Freshman of the Year in 2009 and finished her career with 100 singles victories for only 32 losses, the third highest total in program history. She also amassed a 69–44 record in doubles. In August 2012, Molnar was awarded a wildcard to play qualifying at the WTA tournament in Montreal, but lost to Mirjana Lučić-Baroni in the first round.

=== 2013 ===
Molnar won her first professional singles title at the beginning of January at the $10k event in Fort-de-France with a victory over Shérazad Reix. She also reached a week later her first professional doubles final at the $10k tournament in Saint Martin. In October, Molnar made it to semifinals in doubles of the $25k event in Tampico. Molnar reached at the end of October the semifinals in doubles of the $50k Toronto Challenger.

=== 2014–15 ===
In mid-January 2014 at the $10k event in Saint Martin, Molnar made it to the second professional singles final of her career, but was defeated by Hsu Ching-wen. At the Sumter $10k event in May 2014, she reached the second professional doubles final of her career, but lost to Sophie Chang and Andie Daniell. A week later at the $10k event in Hilton Head, Molnar won her first pro doubles title with a straight-sets win over Lauren Albanese and Macall Harkins. At the end of June 2014, Molnar won the second singles title of her career with a victory over Tori Kinard at the $10k event in Victoria. In September 2014 at the Coupe Banque Nationale, she was awarded a wildcard in doubles which was her first WTA Tour main draw. She lost in the quarterfinals to Barbora Krejčíková and Tatjana Maria. In late October 2014, Molnar reached her biggest doubles final to date at the $50k Saguenay Challenger where she was eliminated by Ysaline Bonaventure and Nicola Slater. In late January 2015, Molnar reached the doubles final of the $10k event in Saint Martin but lost in straight sets to Alexa Guarachi and Ayaka Okuno. In June 2015, she won her third pro singles title after defeating Alexa Graham at the $10k event in Bethany Beach. She played her last match in August 2015 at the Challenger de Gatineau

== ITF Circuit finals ==
Legend
$100,000 tournaments
$75,000 tournaments
$50,000 tournaments
$25,000 tournaments
$10,000 tournaments

=== Singles: 4 (3 titles, 1 runner-up) ===
Result	W–L	Date	Tournament	Tier	Surface	Opponent	Score
Win	1–0	Jan 2013	Fort-de-France, France	10,000	Hard	(France) Shérazad Reix	6–2, 6–0
Loss	1–1	Jan 2014	Saint Martin, France	10,000	Hard	(Chinese Taipei) Hsu Ching-wen	6–4, 4–6, 0–6
Win	2–1	Jun 2014	Victoria, Canada	10,000	Hard (i)	(United States) Tori Kinard	6–4, 7–5
Win	3–1	Jun 2015	Bethany Beach, United States	10,000	Clay	(United States) Alexa Graham	6–1, 7–5

=== Doubles: 5 (1 title, 4 runner-ups) ===
Result	W–L	Date	Tournament	Tier	Surface	Partner	Opponents	Score
Loss	0–1	Jan 2013	ITF Saint Martin, France	10,000	Hard	(United States) Erin Clark	(France) Estelle Cascino (France) Léa Tholey	3–6, 3–6
Loss	0–2	May 2014	ITF Sumter, United States	10,000	Hard	(United States) Caitlin Whoriskey	(United States) Sophie Chang (United States) Andie Daniell	1–6, 3–6
Win	1–2	Jun 2014	ITF Hilton Head, United States	10,000	Hard	(United States) Caitlin Whoriskey	(United States) Lauren Albanese (United States) Macall Harkins	6–3, 6–4
Loss	1–3	Oct 2014	Challenger de Saguenay, Canada	50,000	Hard (i)	(United States) Caitlin Whoriskey	(Belgium) Ysaline Bonaventure (United Kingdom) Nicola Slater	4–6, 4–6
Loss	1–4	Jan 2015	ITF Saint Martin, France	10,000	Hard	(United States) Lena Litvak	(United States) Alexa Guarachi (Japan) Ayaka Okuno	5–7, 3–6

== Record against top 100 players ==
Molnar's win–loss record against players who were ranked world No. 100 or higher when played is as follows:

- (United States) Madison Keys 0–1
- (Croatia) Mirjana Lučić-Baroni 0–1
