= Charlotte Robillard-Millette =

Canadian tennis player (born 1999)

- Country (sports): Canada
- Residence: Blainville, Québec
- Born: January 12, 1999 (age 27) Montreal, Québec
- Height: 1.80 m (5 ft 11 in)
- Turned pro: 2016
- Plays: Left (two-handed backhand)
- Prize money: US$ 32,536

Singles
- Career record: 43–50
- Career titles: 0
- Highest ranking: No. 532 (September 25, 2017)

Doubles
- Career record: 44–36
- Career titles: 2 ITF
- Highest ranking: No. 231 (May 15, 2017)

Team competitions
- Fed Cup: 4–1

Charlotte Robillard-Millette (born January 12, 1999) is a Canadian former professional tennis player. She reached a career-high singles ranking of world No. 532 September 2017 and a career-high WTA doubles ranking of 231 on 15 May 2017. She achieved her best junior ranking of No. 4 June 2015. Since the beginning of the COVID-19 pandemic in early 2020, she has not played professional tennis once again.

== Early life ==
Robillard-Millette started playing tennis at age four, inspired by her big brother. She has been a member of Tennis Canada's National Training Centre in Montreal since the fall of 2013.

== Tennis career ==
=== 2013–14 ===
In October 2013, Robillard-Millette won her first junior title in doubles at the G5 in Burlington, Ontario. A week later, she made her professional debut at the $50k Toronto Challenger where she was defeated in the qualifying second round in singles and the quarterfinals in doubles. In December 2013, she won the Orange Bowl in the U16 category with a three-set win over Alexis Nelson in the final.

In May 2014, Robillard-Millette captured her first junior singles title when she defeated Júlia Payola at the G4 in Budapest. In August 2014 at a $25k event in Winnipeg, she made it to the quarterfinals in singles and doubles. She won her second junior doubles title in October 2014 at the GB1 in Tulsa, Oklahoma. Also in October 2014, Robillard-Millette reached the quarterfinals of the doubles draw at the $50k Challenger de Saguenay.

=== 2015 ===
In January at the junior Australian Open, her first Grand Slam, Robillard-Millette reached the quarterfinals in singles where she was defeated by eventual winner Tereza Mihalíková. She was eliminated in the first round in doubles. In February, she was selected to represent Canada in the World Group first round tie against Czech Republic. In April, she won back-to-back ITF junior singles titles, respectively at the G2 in Istres and at the G1 in Beaulieu-sur-Mer. At the junior draw of the French Open in May, Robillard-Millette reached the third round in singles and the second round in doubles. At the junior event of Wimbledon, she made it to the second round in both singles and doubles. In July at the $50k Challenger de Granby, Robillard-Millette scored an upset when she defeated world No. 224, Amandine Hesse, to reach the quarterfinals. She was defeated by world No. 194, Stéphanie Foretz, in the next round. At the junior US Open in September, she made it to the second round in singles but was forced to withdraw with an abdominal injury. In October at the $50k Challenger de Saguenay, she defeated world No. 176, Shahar Pe'er, in the second round, her biggest win so far, but lost to Maria Sanchez in the quarterfinals.

=== 2016 ===
In January at the junior Australian Open, Robillard-Millette lost in the opening round in singles and in the quarterfinals in doubles. In April, she made her Fed Cup debut playing doubles with Sharon Fichman in the World Group II Play-offs. At the junior French Open in May, she lost in the first round in singles and in the second round in doubles. Robillard-Millette was defeated in the second round in both singles and doubles at Wimbledon. In July at the $25k Winnipeg Challenger, she reached the first professional doubles final of her career with compatriot Marie-Alexandre Leduc. They were defeated by Francesca Di Lorenzo and Ronit Yurovsky. Robillard-Millette captured in August her first professional doubles title with fellow Canadian Bianca Andreescu at the Challenger de Gatineau. In October, she reached quarterfinals in singles and final in doubles at the $50k Challenger de Saguenay. She advanced to the semifinals in doubles at the $50k Tevlin Women's Challenger in November.

=== 2017 ===
In January, Robillard-Millette reached the final of the $15k tournament in Petit-Bourg with Emilie Francati. In February, she was selected to represent Canada at the Fed Cup Americas Zone Group I with Bianca Andreescu, Katherine Sebov and Carol Zhao. She helped Canada reach the World Group II playoffs with a 3–1 overall record. In March, she reached final of the doubles draw at a $15k event in Heraklion with fellow Canadian Carol Zhao. Two weeks later, again with Zhao, she captured the title at the third $15k event in Heraklion, her second doubles crown. In September, she qualified for her first WTA tournament at the Coupe Banque Nationale beating Camilla Rosatello and Conny Perrin, respectively, both top 250 players. She was defeated by Caroline Dolehide in the opening round.

== ITF Circuit finals ==
=== Doubles: 6 (2 titles, 4 runner-ups) ===
Legend
$50,000 tournaments (0–1)
$25,000 tournaments (1–1)
$15,000 tournaments (1–2)

Result	W–L	Date	Tournament	Tier	Surface	Partner	Opponents	Score
Loss	0–1	Jul 2016	Winnipeg Challenger, Canada	25,000	Hard	(Canada) Marie-Alexandre Leduc	(United States) Francesca Di Lorenzo (United States) Ronit Yurovsky	6–1, 5–7, [6–10]
Win	1–1	Aug 2016	Challenger de Gatineau, Canada	25,000	Hard	(Canada) Bianca Andreescu	(Japan) Mana Ayukawa (United Kingdom) Samantha Murray	4–6, 6–4, [10–6]
Loss	1–2	Oct 2016	Challenger de Saguenay, Canada	50,000	Hard (i)	(Canada) Bianca Andreescu	(Romania) Elena Bogdan (Romania) Mihaela Buzărnescu	4–6, 7–6^{(4)}, [6–10]
Loss	1–3	Jan 2017	ITF Petit-Bourg, France	15,000	Hard	(Denmark) Emilie Francati	(Japan) Mayo Hibi (Canada) Carol Zhao	6–2, 6–7^{(6)}, [9–11]
Loss	1–4	Mar 2017	ITF Heraklion, Greece	15,000	Clay	(Canada) Carol Zhao	(Romania) Raluca Șerban (Romania) Oana Georgeta Simion	6–3, 6–7^{(2)}, [2–10]
Win	2–4	Apr 2017	ITF Heraklion, Greece	15,000	Clay	(Canada) Carol Zhao	(Russia) Angelina Gabueva (Russia) Olga Puchkova	7–6^{(2)}, 4–6, [10–5]
