= Françoise Abanda =

Canadian tennis player (born 1997)

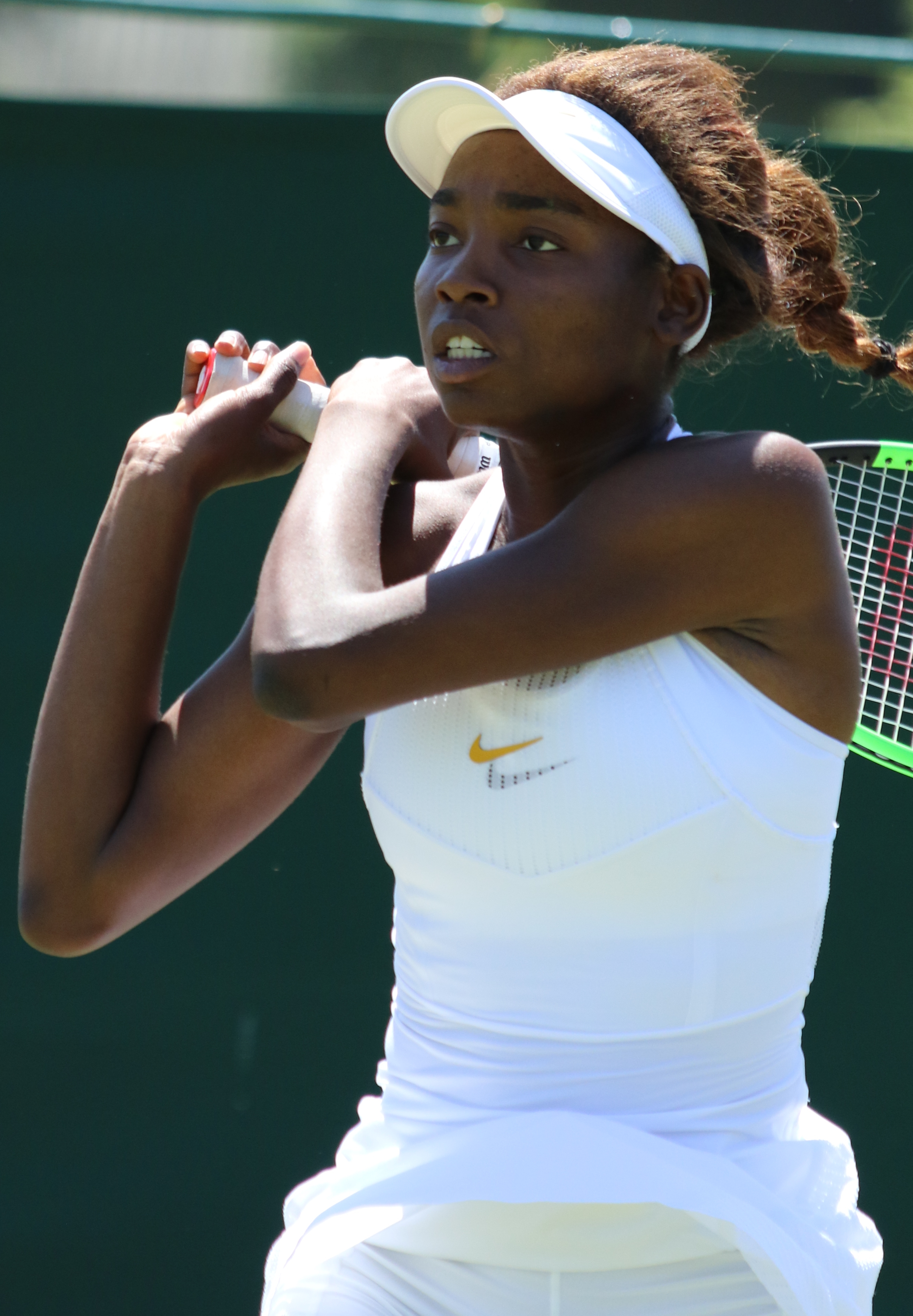
- Abanda in the 2018 Wimbledon qualifying
- Country (sports): Canada
- Residence: Montreal, Quebec
- Born: February 5, 1997 (age 29) Montreal
- Height: 1.78 m (5 ft 10 in)
- Turned pro: 2015
- Plays: Right (two-handed backhand)
- Prize money: $556,922

Singles
- Career record: 225–162
- Career titles: 3 ITF
- Highest ranking: No. 111 (October 9, 2017)
- Current ranking: No. 910 (June 29, 2026)

Grand Slam singles results
- Australian Open: Q2 (2017, 2018)
- French Open: 2R (2017)
- Wimbledon: 2R (2017)
- US Open: 1R (2014)

Doubles
- Career record: 35–36
- Career titles: 3 ITF
- Highest ranking: No. 197 (September 8, 2014)
- Current ranking: No. 858 (June 29, 2026)

Team competitions
- Fed Cup: 7–5
- Last updated on: July 8, 2026.

Françoise Abanda (born February 5, 1997) is a Canadian professional tennis player. She reached her highest WTA singles ranking of 111 on October 9, 2017, and her highest WTA doubles ranking of 197 in September 2014. She achieved a career-high combined junior rank of No. 4 on April 29, 2013.

== Early life ==
Françoise started playing tennis at age seven, after her elder-by-three-years sister Élisabeth started playing two years earlier. She has been a member of Canada's National Training Centre in Montreal since 2009. Her parents, Blaise Abanda and Cecile Essono Ahibena, are from Cameroon. Her sister Élisabeth also played tennis professionally and studied at Barry University.

== Tennis career ==
=== 2011–12 ===
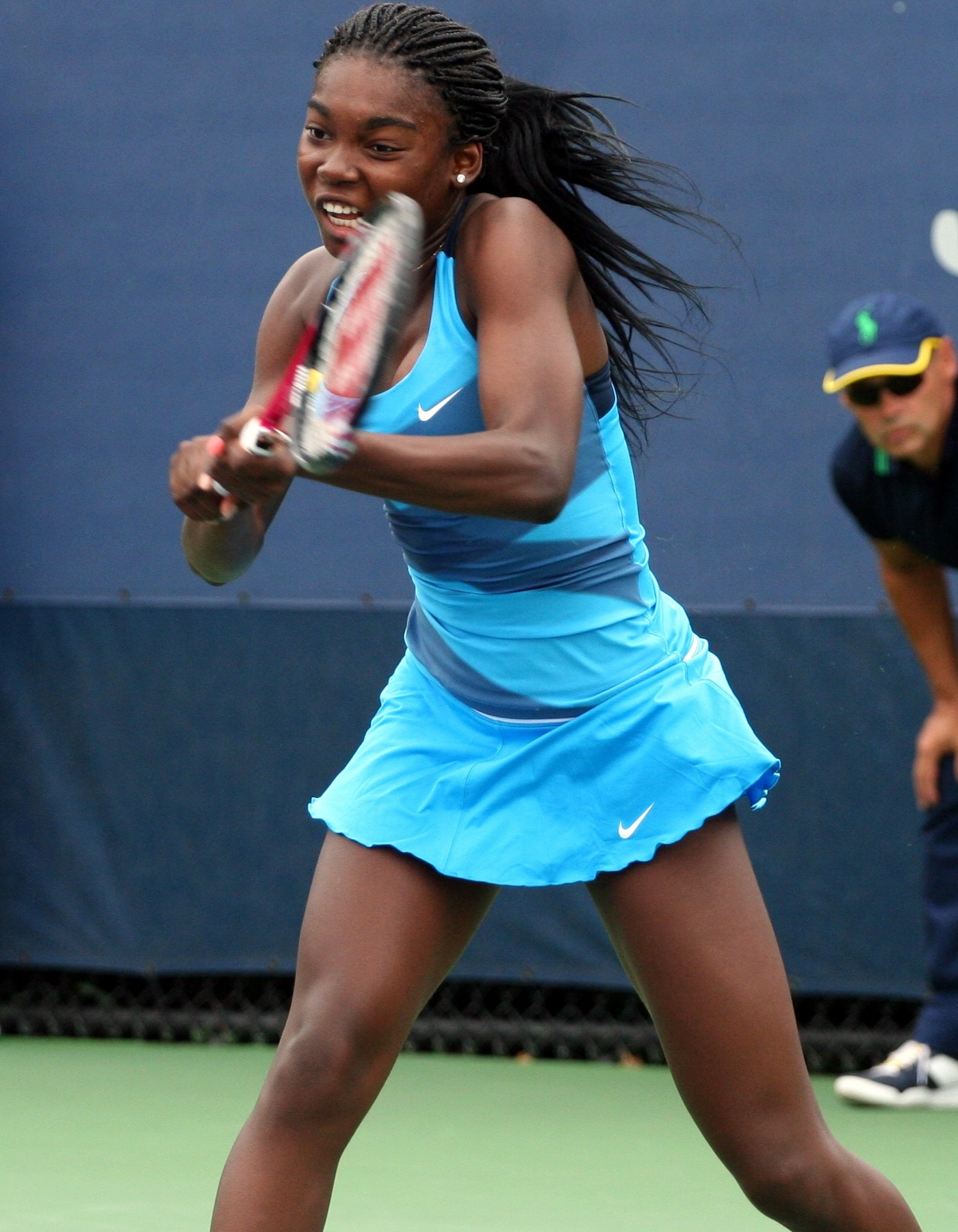
Abanda at the junior 2012 US Open

In 2011, Abanda reached the third round of the junior US Open in singles. In May 2012, she was eliminated in the third round of the junior French Open in singles, and in the quarterfinals in doubles. She lost in the semifinals of the Junior Wimbledon in June 2012 in both singles and doubles. She played and won her first professional match at the $25k event in Granby in July, defeating world No. 331, Jennifer Elie, in the first round before losing to compatriot Eugenie Bouchard in the second. She also reached the doubles semifinals. In August, she reached last round qualifiers at the Rogers Cup as a wildcard, with a win over world No. 104, Irina Falconi, in the second round.

Abanda then won in September the G1 tournament in Repentigny, becoming only the second Québécoise (after Eugenie Bouchard in 2011), and fourth Canadian to win the title there. She made it to the quarterfinals of the junior US Open in doubles at the beginning of September. Also in 2012, she won the GB1 Pan American Closed ITF Championships, with a win over fellow Canadian Carol Zhao in the final. In October 2012, Abanda reached the doubles semifinals at the $50k event in Saguenay. She reached a week later her second straight doubles semifinals, this time at the $50k Toronto Challenger.

=== 2013 ===
Abanda made a first return following her shoulder's injury at an ITF tournament in March but lost in the first round. She made a second return in August at the US Open and reached the second round of the junior event. The following week, she was awarded a wildcard (with fellow Canadian Carol Zhao) in the doubles main draw at the Challenge Bell. This was the first WTA Tour main draw of her career, but lost to Alla Kudryavtseva and Anastasia Rodionova in the quarterfinals.

During the first two weeks of October, Abanda played two back-to-back ITFs in Mexico. In the first, a $15k held in Victoria, Abanda reached the quarterfinals in singles and the semifinals in doubles, with Victoria Rodríguez. The second, a $25k tournament held in Tampico, saw Abanda beat Ana Sofía Sánchez in straight sets in the first round but ultimately lost in the second round. In doubles, she reached the quarterfinals partnering with Indy de Vroome. As a result, she broke the top 400 in doubles for the first time, at world No. 397.

In mid-October, Abanda made it to the quarterfinals in singles at the $25k in Rock Hill. At the end of October, Abanda reached her first professional doubles final at the $50k Saguenay Challenger, but was defeated (with partner Victoria Duval) by Marta Domachowska and Andrea Hlaváčková. She also made it to the quarterfinals in singles. A week later at the $50k Toronto Challenger, Abanda (with Duval again) won her first professional title with a win over Melanie Oudin and Jessica Pegula. At the beginning of December and the last tournament of her season, Abanda reached the quarterfinals at the 25k event in Mérida.

=== 2014 ===
In mid-January, Abanda won her first professional singles title with a victory over compatriot Heidi El Tabakh at the $25k tournament in Port St. Lucie. In February, she qualified for the $100k event in Midland, but was defeated by Sofia Arvidsson in the second round. In March, Abanda made it to the last round of qualifying at the Premier Mandatory Sony Open Tennis, where she was awarded a wildcard, before losing in three sets to Kimiko Date-Krumm. She also reached in April the last round of qualifying at the WTA event in Bogotá. In late April, Abanda made it through to the quarterfinals of the $50k Charlottesville Classic as a qualifier, but was eliminated by Montserrat González in three sets. In May at the Internationaux de Strasbourg, she reached her second WTA quarterfinal in doubles, but was eliminated by third seeds Chan Hao-ching and Chan Yung-jan. In the last week of May, Abanda made it to the semifinals of the $25k event in Maribor where she was eliminated by Yvonne Neuwirth.

At the beginning of June at the French Open, Abanda reached her second junior Grand Slam semifinal, but was defeated by the top seed Ivana Jorović. At Wimbledon a month later, she was eliminated by Markéta Vondroušová in the third round. In July at the inaugural $25k in Gatineau, Abanda made it to her second professional singles final where she was eliminated by Stéphanie Foretz in three sets. The next week, she reached the semifinals of the $25k Granby Challenger. At the Citi Open at the end of July, Abanda was awarded a wildcard for the main draw but was defeated by Vania King in the first round. In August, Abanda was awarded a wildcard for the Rogers Cup main draw in her hometown of Montreal but lost in three sets to world No. 12, Dominika Cibulková. At the US Open in late August, she qualified for her first Grand Slam after losing only six games in the three rounds. She lost to world No. 27, Sabine Lisicki, in the first round. In September at the Coupe Banque Nationale, she was awarded a wildcard for the main draw where she was defeated by world No. 19 and childhood idol, Venus Williams.

=== 2015–16 ===
In February 2015, Abanda was selected for the first time to represent Canada at the Fed Cup. She lost her two matches of the World Group first round tie against the defending champion the Czech Republic. A week later, she reached the semifinals of the $25k event in Surprise. In March 2015, she was awarded a wildcard for the Miami Open main draw, but was defeated by world No. 51, Kaia Kanepi, in the opening round. In April 2015 at the Fed Cup World Group play-offs, Abanda scored her first win over a top-100 player when she upset world No. 33, Irina-Camelia Begu, in the first match against Romania. She lost her second match in three sets to world No. 69, Alexandra Dulgheru. In May 2015, she won her second professional doubles title after defeating Olga Ianchuk and Irina Khromacheva with partner Maria Sanchez at the $50k Charlottesville Classic. At the Rogers Cup in August 2015, Abanda was awarded a wildcard for the main draw in singles but lost in the opening round to world No. 16, Andrea Petkovic, in three sets. She also advanced to the doubles second round with compatriot Heidi El Tabakh.

In March 2016, Abanda won the second singles title of her career after defeating Lesley Kerkhove in straight sets at the $25k in Irapuato. In July 2016, she started working with Canadian tennis coach Alain Humblet and received a wildcard into the Washington Open where she lost to Usue Maitane Arconada in the first round. In August 2016, she advanced to the second round of the Premier-5 Rogers Cup with a win over world No. 66, Zheng Saisai, but was defeated by world No. 20, Elina Svitolina in the next round. In September 2016, she reached the second round of the WTA tournament in Quebec City for the first time. She captured in October 2016 her third singles title with a victory over Sachia Vickery at the $25k tournament in Redding.

=== 2017 ===
In April at the Fed Cup World Group II play-offs against Kazakhstan, Abanda won her two singles matches, respectively over world No. 51, Yaroslava Shvedova and world No. 31, Yulia Putintseva. Canada went on to win the tie 3–2 and secured its place in the World Group II in 2018. In May, Abanda qualified for the French Open for the first time in her career and defeated local Tessah Andrianjafitrimo in the opening round. She lost to world No. 12, Caroline Wozniacki, in her next match, without winning a single game. At Wimbledon, she qualified for her second straight Grand Slam main draw and won her first-round match over world No. 94, Kurumi Nara. She was defeated by reigning French Open champion and world No. 13 Jeļena Ostapenko in the second round in three sets. In August at the Premier 5 Western & Southern Open, she qualified for the main draw with wins over world No. 79, Misaki Doi, and world No. 60, Natalia Vikhlyantseva, respectively. In the first round, she defeated her third straight top-100 player, world No. 84 Magda Linette, but was defeated by world No. 37, Julia Görges, in her next match. In September at the Coupe Banque Nationale, Abanda reached her first WTA quarterfinal defeating Asia Muhammad and world No. 74, Varvara Lepchenko, respectively in the first two rounds, before falling to world No. 63, Tímea Babos.

== Performance timeline ==
Key
W	F	SF	QF	#R	RR	Q#	P#	DNQ	A	Z#	PO	G	S	B	NMS	NTI	P	NH

(W) winner; (F) finalist; (SF) semifinalist; (QF) quarterfinalist; (#R) rounds 4, 3, 2, 1; (RR) round-robin stage; (Q#) qualification round; (P#) preliminary round; (DNQ) did not qualify; (A) absent; (Z#) Davis/Fed Cup Zonal Group (with number indication) or (PO) play-off; (G) gold, (S) silver or (B) bronze Olympic/Paralympic medal; (NMS) not a Masters tournament; (NTI) not a Tier I tournament; (P) postponed; (NH) not held; (SR) strike rate (events won / competed); (W–L) win–loss record.
To avoid confusion and double counting, these charts are updated at the conclusion of a tournament or when the player's participation has ended.

=== Singles ===
Current through the 2021 Billie Jean King Cup.

Tournament	2012	2013	2014	2015	2016	2017	2018	2019	2020	2021	SR	W–L
Grand Slam tournaments
Australian Open	A	A	A	Q1	A	Q2	Q2	A	A	A	0 / 0	0–0
French Open	A	A	A	A	A	2R	Q1	A	A	A	0 / 1	1–1
Wimbledon	A	A	A	A	A	2R	Q1	A	NH	A	0 / 1	1–1
US Open	A	A	1R	A	Q3	Q3	Q3	Q1	A	A	0 / 1	0–1
Win–loss	0–0	0–0	0–1	0–0	0–0	2–2	0–0	0–0	0–0	0–0	0 / 3	2–3
WTA 1000
Dubai / Qatar Open	A	A	A	A	A	A	A	A	A	A	0 / 0	0–0
Indian Wells Open	A	A	A	A	A	Q1	Q1	A	NH	A	0 / 0	0–0
Miami Open	A	A	Q2	1R	A	Q2	Q2	A	NH	A	0 / 1	0–1
Madrid Open	A	A	A	A	A	A	A	A	NH	A	0 / 0	0–0
Italian Open	A	A	A	A	A	A	A	A	A	A	0 / 0	0–0
Canadian Open	Q3	A	1R	1R	2R	1R	2R	Q1	NH	Q1	0 / 5	2–5
Cincinnati Open	A	A	A	A	A	2R	A	A	A	A	0 / 1	1–1
Wuhan Open	NH	NH	A	A	A	A	A	A	NH		0 / 0	0–0
China Open	A	A	A	A	A	A	A	A	NH		0 / 0	0–0
Career statistics
Tournaments	0	0	4	3	3	6	2	0	0	1	Career total: 19	
Titles	0	0	0	0	0	0	0	0	0	0	Career total: 0	
Finals	0	0	0	0	0	0	0	0	0	0	Career total: 0	
Overall win–loss	0–0	0–0	0–4	0–3	2–3	5–6	1–2	0–0	0–0	2–1	8 / 19	
Year-end ranking	606	563	193	384	164	123	224	350	306	349	$538,435	

== ITF Circuit finals ==
Legend
W75 tournaments
W25/35 tournaments
W15 tournaments

=== Singles: 6 (3 titles, 3 runner-ups) ===
Result	W–L	Date	Tournament	Tier	Surface	Opponent	Score
Win	1–0	Jan 2014	ITF Port St. Lucie, United States	W25	Clay	(Canada) Heidi El Tabakh	6–3, 6–4
Loss	1–1	Jul 2014	Challenger de Gatineau, Canada	W25	Hard	(France) Stéphanie Foretz	3–6, 6–3, 3–6
Win	2–1	Mar 2016	Guanajuato Open, Mexico	W25	Hard	(Netherlands) Lesley Kerkhove	6–2, 6–4
Win	3–1	Oct 2016	ITF Redding, United States	W25	Hard	(United States) Sachia Vickery	3–6, 6–4, 6–4
Loss	3–2	Jan 2019	ITF Daytona Beach, United States	W25	Clay	(Hungary) Anna Bondar	7–6^{(3)}, 6–7^{(5)}, 5–7
Loss	3–3	Mar 2026	ITF Gonesse, France	W15	Clay (i)	(Spain) María García Cid	5–7, 1–6

=== Doubles: 6 (3 titles, 3 runner-ups) ===
Result	W–L	Date	Tournament	Tier	Surface	Partner	Opponents	Score
Loss	0–1	Oct 2013	Challenger de Saguenay, Canada	W75	Hard (i)	(United States) Victoria Duval	(Poland) Marta Domachowska (Czech Republic) Andrea Hlaváčková	5–7, 3–6
Win	1–1	Nov 2013	Toronto Challenger, Canada	W75	Hard (i)	(United States) Victoria Duval	(United States) Melanie Oudin (United States) Jessica Pegula	7–6^{(7–5)}, 2–6, [11–9]
Win	2–1	May 2015	Charlottesville Open, United States	W75	Clay	(United States) Maria Sanchez	(Ukraine) Olga Ianchuk (Russia) Irina Khromacheva	6–1, 6–3
Loss	2–2	Jun 2025	ITF Périgueux, France	W35	Clay	(France) Marie Mattel	(Spain) Lucía Cortez Llorca (Spain) Alicia Herrero Liñana	1–6, 4–6
Win	3–2	Mar 2026	ITF Gonesse, France	W15	Clay (i)	(France) Lucie Nguyen Tan	(France) Océane Babel (Czech Republic) Amelie Justine Hejtmanek	6–3, 6–3
Loss	3–3	Nov 2026	ITF Paris, France	W15	Clay (i)	(France) Marie Mattel	(Switzerland) Chelsea Fontenel (Germany) Marie Vogt	4–6, 5–7

== Head-to-head record ==
=== Record against top-100 players ===
Abanda's win–loss record (12–23, 35%) against players who were ranked world No. 100 or higher when played is as follows:
Players who have been ranked world No. 1 are in boldface.

- (Belgium) Yanina Wickmayer 1–0
- (United States) Varvara Lepchenko 1–0
- (Kazakhstan) Yulia Putintseva 1–0
- (Romania) Irina-Camelia Begu 1–0
- (Kazakhstan) Yaroslava Shvedova 1–0
- (Japan) Misaki Doi 1–0
- (Japan) Kurumi Nara 1–0
- (Belarus) Olga Govortsova 1–0
- (Japan) Nao Hibino 1–0 (Note: Has a 2–0 overall record vs. Hibino)
- (China) Zheng Saisai 1–0
- (Russia) Natalia Vikhlyantseva 1–0 (Note: Has a 2–0 overall record vs. Vikhlyantseva)
- (Poland) Magda Linette 1–0
- (Czech Republic) **Karolína Plíšková** 0–1
- (United States) **Venus Williams** 0–1
- (Denmark) **Caroline Wozniacki** 0–1
- (Japan) Kimiko Date-Krumm 0–1
- (Czech Republic) Lucie Šafářová 0–1
- (Ukraine) Elina Svitolina 0–1
- (Germany) Andrea Petkovic 0–1
- (Latvia) Jeļena Ostapenko 0–1
- (Germany) Sabine Lisicki 0–1
- (Estonia) Kaia Kanepi 0–1
- (Hungary) Tímea Babos 0–1
- (Romania) Alexandra Dulgheru 0–1
- (Romania) Monica Niculescu 0–1
- (France) Kristina Mladenovic 0–1
- (United States) Vania King 0–1
- (Germany) Tatjana Maria 0–1 (Note: has a 0–2 overall record vs. Maria)
- (Belarus) Aliaksandra Sasnovich 0–1
- (United States) Jennifer Brady 0–1
- (Russia) Evgeniya Rodina 0–1
- (Slovakia) Dominika Cibulková 0–2
- (Germany) Julia Görges 0–2

* as of August 25, 2021
