= 2019 Tevlin Women's Challenger =

- Date: 28 October–3 November 2019
- Edition: 15th
- Category: ITF Women's World Tennis Tour
- Prize money: $60,000
- Surface: Hard / Indoor
- Location: Toronto, Canada

Champions

Singles
- (United States) Francesca Di Lorenzo

Doubles
- (United States) Robin Anderson / (France) Jessika Ponchet
← 2018 ·	Tevlin Women's Challenger	· 2022 →

The 2019 Tevlin Women's Challenger was a professional tennis tournament played on indoor hard courts. It was the fifteenth edition of the tournament which was part of the 2019 ITF Women's World Tennis Tour. It took place in Toronto, Canada between 28 October and 3 November 2019.

== Singles main-draw entrants ==
=== Seeds ===
Country	Player	Rank^{1}	Seed
BEL	Kirsten Flipkens	99	1
USA	Francesca Di Lorenzo	137	2
NED	Bibiane Schoofs	156	3
USA	Sachia Vickery	160	4
USA	Robin Anderson	177	5
FRA	Jessika Ponchet	182	6
BUL	Elitsa Kostova	199	7
SRB	Jovana Jakšić	229	8

- ^{1} Rankings are as of 21 October 2019.

=== Other entrants ===
The following players received wildcards into the singles main draw:

- (Canada) Françoise Abanda
- (Canada) Ariana Arseneault
- (Canada) Jada Bui
- (Canada) Mélodie Collard

The following players received entry from the qualifying draw:

- (Czech Republic) Michaela Bayerlová
- (United Kingdom) Naomi Broady
- (United States) Hayley Carter
- (Netherlands) Arianne Hartono
- (United States) Dalayna Hewitt
- (Canada) Raphaëlle Lacasse
- (Russia) Anna Morgina
- (United States) Kennedy Shaffer

== Champions ==
=== Singles ===
- (United States) Francesca Di Lorenzo def. (Belgium) Kirsten Flipkens, 7–6^{(7–3)}, 6–4

=== Doubles ===
- (United States) Robin Anderson / (France) Jessika Ponchet def. (Canada) Mélodie Collard / (Canada) Leylah Annie Fernandez, 7–6^{(9–7)}, 6–2
