= 2022 Tevlin Women's Challenger =

Tennis tournament

- Date: 24–30 October 2022
- Edition: 16th
- Category: ITF Women's World Tennis Tour
- Prize money: $60,000
- Surface: Hard / Indoor
- Location: Toronto, Canada

Champions

Singles
- (United States) Robin Anderson

Doubles
- (Czech Republic) Michaela Bayerlová / (South Korea) Jang Su-jeong
← 2019 ·	Tevlin Women's Challenger	· 2023 →

The 2022 Tevlin Women's Challenger was a professional tennis tournament played on indoor hard courts. It was the sixteenth edition of the tournament which was part of the 2022 ITF Women's World Tennis Tour. It took place in Toronto, Canada between 24 and 30 October 2022.

== Champions ==
=== Singles ===
- (United States) Robin Anderson def. (South Korea) Jang Su-jeong, 6–2, 6–4

=== Doubles ===
- (Czech Republic) Michaela Bayerlová / (South Korea) Jang Su-jeong def. (Australia) Elysia Bolton / (United States) Jamie Loeb, 6–3, 6–2

== Singles main draw entrants ==
=== Seeds ===
Country	Player	Rank^{1}	Seed
KOR	Jang Su-jeong	133	1
SWE	Mirjam Björklund	136	2
USA	Louisa Chirico	155	3
USA	Robin Anderson	164	4
NED	Arianne Hartono	207	5
USA	Jamie Loeb	240	6
HKG	Eudice Chong	242	7
USA	Francesca Di Lorenzo	251	8

- ^{1} Rankings are as of 17 October 2022.

=== Other entrants ===
The following players received wildcards into the singles main draw:

- (Canada) Kayla Cross
- (Canada) Stacey Fung
- (Canada) Marina Stakusic
- (Canada) Annabelle Xu

The following players received entry from the qualifying draw:

- (Canada) Ariana Arseneault
- (Australia) Elysia Bolton
- (United States) Dalayna Hewitt
- (Serbia) Katarina Jokić
- (United States) Raveena Kingsley
- (Mexico) María Portillo Ramírez
- (Poland) Urszula Radwańska
- ~~(Canada) Layne Sleeth~~

The following players received entry as lucky losers:

- (United States) Paris Corley
- (Poland) Olivia Lincer
