= 2019 Tevlin Women's Challenger – Singles =

Singles
- 2019 Tevlin Women's Challenger

Final
- Champion: (United States) Francesca Di Lorenzo
- Runner-up: (Belgium) Kirsten Flipkens
- Score: 7–6^{(7–3)}, 6–4

Events
Singles	Doubles
← 2018 ·	Tevlin Women's Challenger	· 2022 →

Quirine Lemoine was the defending champion, but chose not to participate.

Francesca Di Lorenzo won the title, defeating Kirsten Flipkens in the final, 7–6^{(7–3)}, 6–4.

== Seeds ==
1. (Belgium) Kirsten Flipkens (final)
2. (United States) Francesca Di Lorenzo (champion)
3. (Netherlands) Bibiane Schoofs (semifinals)
4. (United States) Sachia Vickery (first round)
5. (United States) Robin Anderson (first round)
6. (France) Jessika Ponchet (quarterfinals)
7. (Bulgaria) Elitsa Kostova (quarterfinals)
8. (Serbia) Jovana Jakšić (first round)

== Draw ==
=== Key ===
- Q = Qualifier
- WC = Wild card
- LL = Lucky loser
- Alt = Alternate
- SE = Special exempt
- PR = Protected ranking
- ITF = ITF entry
- JE = Junior exempt
- w/o = Walkover
- r = Retired
- d = Defaulted
- SR = Special ranking

=== Finals ===
Semifinals
1	(Belgium) Kirsten Flipkens	2	6	6
(United Kingdom) Samantha Murray	6	2	3
3	(Netherlands) Bibiane Schoofs	5	6	2
2	(United States) Francesca Di Lorenzo	7	0	6

Final
1	(Belgium) Kirsten Flipkens	6^{3}	4
2	(United States) Francesca Di Lorenzo	7^{7}	6

=== Top half ===
First round
1	(Belgium) K Flipkens	6	6
WC	(Canada) A Arseneault	2	1
(Hungary) F Stollár	6	6^{5}	6
Q	(Canada) R Lacasse	3	7^{7}	1
Q	(United Kingdom) N Broady	6	6
Q	(United States) K Shaffer	3	3
WC	(Canada) M Collard	2	6	1
7	(Bulgaria) E Kostova	6	4	6
4	(United States) S Vickery	3	3
WC	(Canada) F Abanda	6	6
Q	(Czech Republic) M Bayerlová	4	5
(Netherlands) I de Vroome	6	7
(United States) Q Gleason	2	4
(United Kingdom) S Murray	6	6
Q	(United States) H Carter	1	7^{7}	7
8	(Serbia) J Jakšić	6	6^{4}	5

Second round
1	(Belgium) K Flipkens	6	6
(Hungary) F Stollár	2	2
Q	(United Kingdom) N Broady	3	3
7	(Bulgaria) E Kostova	6	6
WC	(Canada) F Abanda	2	0^{r}
(Netherlands) I de Vroome	6	0
(United Kingdom) S Murray	7	7
Q	(United States) H Carter	5	5

Quarterfinals
1	(Belgium) K Flipkens	6	6
7	(Bulgaria) E Kostova	3	2
(Netherlands) I de Vroome	5	6	1
(United Kingdom) S Murray	7	3	6

Semifinals
1	(Belgium) K Flipkens	2	6	6
(United Kingdom) S Murray	6	2	3

=== Bottom half ===
First round
6	(France) J Ponchet	6	7^{7}
(Belgium) K Zimmermann	1	6^{4}
(Thailand) P Plipuech	6^{5}	2
WC	(Canada) J Bui	7^{7}	6
(Switzerland) L Küng	3	0
(Norway) U Eikeri	6	6
(Canada) LA Fernandez	6	5	4
3	(Netherlands) B Schoofs	2	7	6
5	(United States) R Anderson	6	6^{4}	5
(United States) C Harrison	1	7^{7}	7
Q	(Netherlands) A Hartono	6	2	7
Q	(Russia) A Morgina	3	6	5
(Sweden) M Björklund	6	6^{4}	7^{7}
(United States) E Bektas	4	7^{7}	6^{1}
Q	(United States) D Hewitt	6^{6}	4
2	(United States) F Di Lorenzo	7^{8}	6

Second round
6	(France) J Ponchet	6	7^{7}
WC	(Canada) J Bui	3	6^{3}
(Norway) U Eikeri	7^{7}	1	0
3	(Netherlands) B Schoofs	6^{5}	6	6
(United States) C Harrison	6	6
Q	(Netherlands) A Hartono	4	1
(Sweden) M Björklund	4	6	3
2	(United States) F Di Lorenzo	6	2	6

Quarterfinals
6	(France) J Ponchet	4	4
3	(Netherlands) B Schoofs	6	6
(United States) C Harrison	7^{9}	1	4
2	(United States) F Di Lorenzo	6^{7}	6	6

Semifinals
3	(Netherlands) B Schoofs	5	6	2
2	(United States) F Di Lorenzo	7	0	6
