= 2016 Tevlin Women's Challenger =

- Date: October 31 – November 6
- Edition: 12th
- Category: ITF Women's Circuit
- Prize money: US$50,000
- Surface: Hard – indoors
- Location: Toronto, Ontario, Canada
- Venue: Aviva Centre

Champions

Singles
- (United States) Catherine Bellis

Doubles
- (Canada) Gabriela Dabrowski / (Netherlands) Michaëlla Krajicek
| ← 2015 · | Tevlin Women's Challenger | · 2017 → |

The 2016 Tevlin Women's Challenger was a professional tennis tournament played on indoor hard courts. It was the 12th edition of the tournament and part of the 2016 ITF Women's Circuit, offering a total of $50,000 in prize money. It took place in Toronto, Ontario, Canada between October 31 and November 6, 2016.

== Singles main-draw entrants ==
=== Seeds ===
| Country | Player | Rank^{1} | Seed |
|---|---|---|---|
| USA | Catherine Bellis | 101 | 1 |
| BEL | Elise Mertens | 132 | 2 |
| CAN | Françoise Abanda | 169 | 3 |
| CZE | Jesika Malečková | 220 | 4 |
| GBR | Laura Robson | 221 | 5 |
| SRB | Jovana Jakšić | 224 | 6 |
| USA | Lauren Albanese | 249 | 7 |
| NED | Michaëlla Krajicek | 258 | 8 |

- ^{1} Rankings are as of October 24, 2016

=== Other entrants ===
The following players received wildcards into the singles main draw:

- (United States) Carson Branstine
- (Canada) Gabriela Dabrowski
- (Canada) Charlotte Robillard-Millette
- (Canada) Layne Sleeth

The following players received entry from the qualifying draw:

- (United States) Emina Bektas
- (United States) Julia Elbaba
- (Canada) Katherine Sebov
- (United States) Ronit Yurovsky

The following player received entry by junior exempt:

- (Canada) Bianca Andreescu

== Champions ==
=== Singles ===
- (United States) Catherine Bellis def. (Czech Republic) Jesika Malečková, 6–2, 1–6, 6–3

=== Doubles ===
- (Canada) Gabriela Dabrowski / (Netherlands) Michaëlla Krajicek def. (United States) Ashley Weinhold / (United States) Caitlin Whoriskey, 6–4, 6–3
