= 2022 Tevlin Women's Challenger – Singles =

Singles
- 2022 Tevlin Women's Challenger

Final
- Champion: (United States) Robin Anderson
- Runner-up: (South Korea) Jang Su-jeong
- Score: 6–2, 6–4

Events
Singles	Doubles
← 2019 ·	Tevlin Women's Challenger	· 2023 →

Francesca Di Lorenzo was the defending champion, but lost in the quarterfinals to Robin Anderson.

Anderson went on to win the title, defeating Jang Su-jeong in the final, 6–2, 6–4.

== Seeds ==
1. (South Korea) Jang Su-jeong (final)
2. (Sweden) Mirjam Björklund (quarterfinals)
3. (United States) Louisa Chirico (first round)
4. (United States) Robin Anderson (champion)
5. (Netherlands) Arianne Hartono (first round)
6. (United States) Jamie Loeb (quarterfinals)
7. (Hong Kong) Eudice Chong (semifinals)
8. (United States) Francesca Di Lorenzo (quarterfinals)

== Draw ==
Key

- Q = Qualifier
- WC = Wild card
- LL = Lucky loser
- Alt = Alternate
- ITF = ITF entry
- PR = Protected ranking
- SR = Special ranking
- SE = Special exempt
- JE = Junior exempt
- JR = Junior Accelerator Programme entrant
- CO = College Accelerator Programme entrant
- NG = Next Gen Accelerator Program entrant
- w/o = Walkover
- r = Retired
- d = Defaulted

=== Finals ===
Semifinals
1	(South Korea) Jang Su-jeong	7^{10}	6
Q	(Poland) Urszula Radwańska	6^{8}	3
4	(United States) Robin Anderson	7^{7}	6
7	(Hong Kong) Eudice Chong	6^{2}	4

Final
1	(South Korea) Jang Su-jeong	2	4
4	(United States) Robin Anderson	6	6

=== Top half ===
First round
1	(South Korea) S-j Jang	6	6
(Czech Republic) M Bayerlová	2	0
Q	(United States) R Kingsley	6	6^{2}	3
Q	(United States) D Hewitt	1	7^{7}	6
(India) K Thandi	7	7^{13}
(Chinese Taipei) E-s Liang	5	6^{11}
Q	(Mexico) M Portillo Ramírez	2	4
6	(United States) J Loeb	6	6
3	(United States) L Chirico	3	6	1
Q	(Poland) U Radwańska	6	3	6
WC	(Canada) A Xu	1	3
(United Kingdom) SB Grey	6	6
LL	(Poland) O Lincer	6	5	6
(Australia) O Tjandramulia	4	7	3
(United States) R Montgomery	6	6
5	(Netherlands) A Hartono	0	0

Second round
1	(South Korea) S-j Jang	5	6	6
Q	(United States) D Hewitt	7	2	3
(India) K Thandi	1^{r}
6	(United States) J Loeb	5
Q	(Poland) U Radwańska	6	6
(United Kingdom) SB Grey	0	2
LL	(Poland) O Lincer	4	2
(United States) R Montgomery	6	6

Quarterfinals
1	(South Korea) S-j Jang	6	6
6	(United States) J Loeb	2	3
Q	(Poland) U Radwańska	7^{7}	6
(United States) R Montgomery	6^{4}	4

Semifinals
1	(South Korea) S-j Jang	7^{10}	6
Q	(Poland) U Radwańska	6^{8}	3

=== Bottom half ===
First round
8	(United States) F Di Lorenzo	6	6
WC	(Canada) K Cross	4	3
(United States) W Osuigwe	4	6	6
(Czech Republic) A Sisková	6	3	2
WC	(Canada) M Stakusic	6	6
LL	(United States) P Corley	2	2
Q	(Australia) E Bolton	4	2
4	(United States) R Anderson	6	6
7	(Hong Kong) E Chong	6	6
(United States) E Bektas	4	2
WC	(Canada) S Fung	6	6
Q	(Canada) A Arseneault	2	4
Q	(Serbia) K Jokić	1	3
(United States) V Duval	6	6
(Slovakia) V Morvayová	1	3
2	(Sweden) M Björklund	6	6

Second round
8	(United States) F Di Lorenzo	6	6
(United States) W Osuigwe	3	4
WC	(Canada) M Stakusic	2	5
4	(United States) R Anderson	6	7
7	(Hong Kong) E Chong	6	6
WC	(Canada) S Fung	1	0
(United States) V Duval	1	0^{r}
2	(Sweden) M Björklund	6	1

Quarterfinals
8	(United States) F Di Lorenzo	4	1
4	(United States) R Anderson	6	6
7	(Hong Kong) E Chong	6	7^{7}
2	(Sweden) M Björklund	1	6^{5}

Semifinals
4	(United States) R Anderson	7^{7}	6
7	(Hong Kong) E Chong	6^{2}	4
