= 2016 Tevlin Women's Challenger – Doubles =

Doubles
- 2016 Tevlin Women's Challenger

Final
- Champions: (Canada) Gabriela Dabrowski (Netherlands) Michaëlla Krajicek
- Runners-up: (United States) Ashley Weinhold (United States) Caitlin Whoriskey
- Score: 6–4, 6–3

Events
Singles	Doubles
← 2015 ·	Tevlin Women's Challenger	· 2017 →

Sharon Fichman and Maria Sanchez were the defending champions, but decided not to participate this year.

Gabriela Dabrowski and Michaëlla Krajicek won the title, defeating Ashley Weinhold and Caitlin Whoriskey 6–4, 6–3 in the final.

== Seeds ==
1. (Canada) Gabriela Dabrowski / (Netherlands) Michaëlla Krajicek (champions)
2. (United States) Ashley Weinhold / (United States) Caitlin Whoriskey (final)
3. (Romania) Elena Bogdan / (Romania) Mihaela Buzărnescu (first round)
4. (Serbia) Jovana Jakšić / (Mexico) Renata Zarazúa (first round)

== Draw ==
=== Key ===
- Q = Qualifier
- WC = Wild card
- LL = Lucky loser
- Alt = Alternate
- SE = Special exempt
- PR = Protected ranking
- ITF = ITF entry
- JE = Junior exempt
- w/o = Walkover
- r = Retired
- d = Defaulted
- SR = Special ranking

First round
1	(Canada) G Dabrowski (Netherlands) M Krajicek	6	6
(France) V Muntean (United States) A Riley	1	0
WC	(Canada) L Chypyha (Canada) L Sleeth	6	6
WC	(Canada) A Craciun (Canada) M Drca	3	4
4	(Serbia) J Jakšić (Mexico) R Zarazúa	6^{7}	6	[0]
(United States) A Stevenson (Hungary) F Stollár	7^{9}	2	[10]
(Samoa) S Carruthers (United States) J Ho	1	6	[6]
(Canada) B Andreescu (Canada) C Robillard-Millette	6	3	[10]
(Czech Republic) J Malečková (United States) J Wacnik	6	2	[7]
(Austria) P König (Germany) L Schaeder	3	6	[10]
WC	(Russia) E Bovina (United States) C Branstine	4	7	[10]
3	(Romania) E Bogdan (Romania) M Buzărnescu	6	5	[6]
(France) T Andrianjafitrimo (United States) M Gordon	3	5
(United States) E Bektas (United States) R Yurovsky	6	7
(United States) J Elbaba (Belgium) E Mertens	6	2	[5]
2	(United States) A Weinhold (United States) C Whoriskey	4	6	[10]

Quarterfinals
1	(Canada) G Dabrowski (Netherlands) M Krajicek	6	6
WC	(Canada) L Chypyha (Canada) L Sleeth	0	1
(United States) A Stevenson (Hungary) F Stollár	5	4
(Canada) B Andreescu (Canada) C Robillard-Millette	7	6
(Austria) P König (Germany) L Schaeder	6^{7}	5
WC	(Russia) E Bovina (United States) C Branstine	7^{9}	7
(United States) E Bektas (United States) R Yurovsky	7^{7}	3	[8]
2	(United States) A Weinhold (United States) C Whoriskey	6^{3}	6	[10]

Semifinals
1	(Canada) G Dabrowski (Netherlands) M Krajicek	6	6
(Canada) B Andreescu (Canada) C Robillard-Millette	3	4
WC	(Russia) E Bovina (United States) C Branstine	7^{7}	1	[6]
2	(United States) A Weinhold (United States) C Whoriskey	6^{5}	6	[10]

Final
1	(Canada) G Dabrowski (Netherlands) M Krajicek	6	6
2	(United States) A Weinhold (United States) C Whoriskey	4	3
