= 2023 Tevlin Women's Challenger – Doubles =

Doubles
- 2023 Tevlin Women's Challenger

Final
- Champions: (United States) Carmen Corley (United States) Ivana Corley
- Runners-up: (Canada) Kayla Cross (United States) Liv Hovde
- Score: 6–7^{(6–8)}, 6–3, [10–3]

Events
Singles	Doubles
← 2022 ·	Tevlin Women's Challenger	· 2024 →

Michaela Bayerlová and Jang Su-jeong were the defending champions but chose not to participate.

Carmen Corley and Ivana Corley won the title, defeating Kayla Cross and Liv Hovde in the final, 6–7^{(6–8)}, 6–3, [10–3].

== Seeds ==
1. (United Kingdom) Sarah Beth Grey / (United Kingdom) Eden Silva (quarterfinals)
2. (United States) Robin Anderson / (United States) Dalayna Hewitt (first round)
3. (United States) Carmen Corley / (United States) Ivana Corley (champions)
4. (United States) Rasheeda McAdoo / (France) Marine Partaud (first round)

== Draw ==
=== Key ===
- Q = Qualifier
- WC = Wild card
- LL = Lucky loser
- Alt = Alternate
- ITF = ITF entry
- PR = Protected ranking
- SR = Special ranking
- SE = Special exempt
- JE = Junior exempt
- JR = Junior Accelerator Programme entrant
- CO = College Accelerator Programme entrant
- NG = Next Gen Accelerator Program entrant
- w/o = Walkover
- r = Retired
- d = Defaulted

First round
1	(United Kingdom) SB Grey (United Kingdom) E Silva	6	6
WC	(Canada) N Akinbiyi (Canada) A Grubor	1	0
(Canada) C Brace; K Pavlova	6	1	[4]
(United States) J Daniel (United States) A Markham	3	6	[10]
3	(United States) C Corley (United States) I Corley	6	4	[10]
(United States) A Zamarripa (United States) M Zamarripa	3	6	[8]
WC	(Canada) S Nicholson (Canada) R Verma	6	6
(Japan) N Hanatani (United States) S Leon	1	1
(Netherlands) L Pattinama Kerkhove (Poland) U Radwańska	6	7^{7}
(Germany) J Jebawy (United States) K McKenzie	3	6^{2}
WC	(Canada) L Kwong (United States) A Ulyashchenko	6	7^{7}
4	(United States) R McAdoo (France) M Partaud	3	6^{5}
(Croatia) J Fett (Lithuania) J Mikulskytė	1	4
(Serbia) K Jokić (Denmark) J Svendsen	6	6
(Canada) K Cross (United States) L Hovde	7^{7}	1	[13]
2	(United States) R Anderson (United States) D Hewitt	6^{5}	6	[11]

Quarterfinals
1	(United Kingdom) SB Grey (United Kingdom) E Silva	4	3
(United States) J Daniel (United States) A Markham	6	6
3	(United States) C Corley (United States) I Corley	6	6
WC	(Canada) S Nicholson (Canada) R Verma	2	3
(Netherlands) L Pattinama Kerkhove (Poland) U Radwańska	6^{5}	6	[8]
WC	(Canada) L Kwong (United States) A Ulyashchenko	7^{7}	3	[10]
(Serbia) K Jokić (Denmark) J Svendsen	1	6	[7]
(Canada) K Cross (United States) L Hovde	6	4	[10]

Semifinals
(United States) J Daniel (United States) A Markham	4	2
3	(United States) C Corley (United States) I Corley	6	6
WC	(Canada) L Kwong (United States) A Ulyashchenko	1	1
(Canada) K Cross (United States) L Hovde	6	6

Final
3	(United States) C Corley (United States) I Corley	6^{6}	6	[10]
(Canada) K Cross (United States) L Hovde	7^{8}	3	[3]
