= 2015 Tevlin Women's Challenger =

Professional tennis tournament

- Date: October 26 – November 1
- Edition: 11th
- Category: ITF Women's Circuit
- Prize money: US$50,000
- Surface: Hard – indoors
- Location: Toronto, Ontario, Canada
- Venue: Aviva Centre

Champions

Singles
- (Germany) Tatjana Maria

Doubles
- (Canada) Sharon Fichman / (United States) Maria Sanchez
← 2014 ·	Tevlin Women's Challenger	· 2016 →

The 2015 Tevlin Women's Challenger was a professional tennis tournament played on indoor hard courts. It was the 11th edition of the tournament and part of the 2015 ITF Women's Circuit, offering a total of $50,000 in prize money. It took place in Toronto, Ontario, Canada between October 26 and November 1, 2015.

== Singles main-draw entrants ==
=== Seeds ===
Country	Player	Rank^{1}	Seed
GER	Tatjana Maria	73	1
USA	Jessica Pegula	151	2
LIE	Stephanie Vogt	162	3
USA	Samantha Crawford	175	4
ISR	Shahar Pe'er	176	5
USA	Maria Sanchez	180	6
NED	Michaëlla Krajicek	185	7
USA	Kristie Ahn	224	8

- ^{1} Rankings are as of October 19, 2015

=== Other entrants ===
The following players received wildcards into the singles main draw:

- (Canada) Bianca Andreescu
- (Canada) Charlotte Robillard-Millette
- (Hungary) Fanni Stollár
- (Canada) Carol Zhao

The following players received entry from the qualifying draw:

- (Canada) Isabelle Boulais
- (Norway) Ulrikke Eikeri
- (Japan) Mari Osaka
- (Netherlands) Eva Wacanno

The following player received entry as a lucky loser:

- (India) Karman Kaur Thandi

== Champions ==
=== Singles ===
- (Germany) Tatjana Maria def. (Serbia) Jovana Jakšić, 6–3, 6–2

=== Doubles ===
- (Canada) Sharon Fichman / (United States) Maria Sanchez def. (United States) Kristie Ahn / (Hungary) Fanny Stollár, 6–2, 6–7^{(6–8)}, [10–6]
