= 2025 Tevlin Women's Challenger – Doubles =

Doubles
- 2025 Tevlin Women's Challenger

Final
- Champions: (Slovakia) Viktória Hrunčáková; Anastasia Tikhonova
- Runners-up: (United States) Fiona Crawley (United States) Jaeda Daniel
- Score: 6–4, 6–2

Events
Singles	Doubles
← 2024 ·	Tevlin Women's Challenger	· 2026 →

Jamie Loeb and Justina Mikulskyte were the defending champions but chose not to participate.

Viktória Hrunčáková and Anastasia Tikhonova won the title, defeating Fiona Crawley and Jaeda Daniel in the final, 6–4, 6–2.

== Seeds ==
1. (United States) Carmen Corley / (United States) Ivana Corley (first round)
2. (Canada) Kayla Cross / (United Kingdom) Amelia Rajecki (semifinals)
3. (Turkey) Ayla Aksu / (Netherlands) Jasmijn Gimbrère (first round)
4. (Slovakia) Viktória Hrunčáková / Anastasia Tikhonova (champions)

== Draw ==
Key

- Q = Qualifier
- WC = Wild card
- LL = Lucky loser
- Alt = Alternate
- ITF = ITF entry
- PR = Protected ranking
- SR = Special ranking
- SE = Special exempt
- JE = Junior exempt
- JR = Junior Accelerator Programme entrant
- CO = College Accelerator Programme entrant
- NG = Next Gen Accelerator Program entrant
- w/o = Walkover
- r = Retired
- d = Defaulted

=== Draw ===
First round
1	(United States) C Corley (United States) I Corley	4	6	[6]
(United States) R McAdoo (United States) M Zampardo	6	4	[10]
(Japan) A Koshiishi (United States) A Reami	1	7	[2]
(United Kingdom) E Adeshina (United Kingdom) V Allen	6	5	[10]
4	(Slovakia) V Hrunčáková; A Tikhonova	6	6
(Canada) N Lagaev (Canada) C Mercier	4	4
(Canada) A Arseneault (Canada) R Lacasse	7	6
(United States) K Collins (Switzerland) J Dürst	5	0
(United States) F Crawley (United States) J Daniel	6	6
(United States) O Lincer (United States) M Rapolu	2	0
(Canada) T Chavez (Canada) S Nicholson	6	4	[10]
3	(Turkey) A Aksu (Netherlands) J Gimbrère	3	6	[8]
(Australia) E Bolton (United States) C Harrison	6	4	[10]
(Canada) M Collard (Canada) A Vagramov	0	6	[6]
(Japan) H Arakawa (Japan) N Arakawa	3	5
2	(Canada) K Cross (United Kingdom) A Rajecki	6	7

Quarterfinals
(United States) R McAdoo (United States) M Zampardo	7^{7}	7^{7}
(United Kingdom) E Adeshina (United Kingdom) V Allen	6^{5}	6^{4}
4	(Slovakia) V Hrunčáková; A Tikhonova	6	6
(Canada) A Arseneault (Canada) R Lacasse	4	4
(United States) F Crawley (United States) J Daniel	2	6	[10]
(Canada) T Chavez (Canada) S Nicholson	6	0	[8]
(Australia) E Bolton (United States) C Harrison	3	5
2	(Canada) K Cross (United Kingdom) A Rajecki	6	7

Semifinals
(United States) R McAdoo (United States) M Zampardo	2	4
4	(Slovakia) V Hrunčáková; A Tikhonova	6	6
(United States) F Crawley (United States) J Daniel	6	6
2	(Canada) K Cross (United Kingdom) A Rajecki	4	4

Final
4	(Slovakia) V Hrunčáková; A Tikhonova	6	6
(United States) F Crawley (United States) J Daniel	4	2
