= 2023 Tevlin Women's Challenger =

Tennis tournament

- Date: 23–29 October 2023
- Edition: 17th
- Category: ITF Women's World Tennis Tour
- Prize money: $60,000
- Surface: Hard / Indoor
- Location: Toronto, Canada

Champions

Singles
- (Canada) Marina Stakusic

Doubles
- (United States) Carmen Corley / (United States) Ivana Corley
← 2022 ·	Tevlin Women's Challenger	· 2024 →

The 2023 Tevlin Women's Challenger was a professional tennis tournament played on indoor hard courts. It was the seventeenth edition of the tournament which was part of the 2023 ITF Women's World Tennis Tour. It took place in Toronto, Canada between 23 and 29 October 2023.

== Champions ==
=== Singles ===
- (Canada) Marina Stakusic def. (Croatia) Jana Fett, 3–6, 7–5, 6–3

=== Doubles ===
- (United States) Carmen Corley / (United States) Ivana Corley def. (Canada) Kayla Cross / (United States) Liv Hovde, 6–7^{(6–8)}, 6–3, [10–3]

== Singles main draw entrants ==
=== Seeds ===
Country	Player	Rank^{1}	Seed
~~CAN~~	~~Katherine Sebov~~	~~155~~	~~1~~
AUS	Arina Rodionova	159	2
CRO	Jana Fett	198	3
SUI	Lulu Sun	218	4
NED	Lesley Pattinama Kerkhove	231	5
JPN	Haruka Kaji	245	6
USA	Louisa Chirico	256	7
LTU	Justina Mikulskytė	274	8

- ^{1} Rankings are as of 16 October 2023.

=== Other entrants ===
The following players received wildcards into the singles main draw:

- (Canada) Ariana Arseneault
- (Canada) Isabelle Boulais
- (Canada) Kayla Cross
- (Canada) Layne Sleeth

The following player received entry using a junior exempt:

- (United States) Liv Hovde

The following players received entry from the qualifying draw:

- (United States) Dalayna Hewitt
- (Serbia) Katarina Jokić
- (United States) Tori Kinard
- (Poland) Olivia Lincer
- (United States) Ava Markham
- (France) Caroline Romeo
- (United States) Anna Ulyashchenko
- (United Kingdom) Tiffany William

The following player received entry as a lucky loser:

- (United States) Paris Corley
