= 2022 Tevlin Women's Challenger – Doubles =

Doubles
- 2022 Tevlin Women's Challenger

Final
- Champions: (Czech Republic) Michaela Bayerlová (South Korea) Jang Su-jeong
- Runners-up: (Australia) Elysia Bolton (United States) Jamie Loeb
- Score: 6–3, 6–2

Events
Singles	Doubles
← 2019 ·	Tevlin Women's Challenger	· 2023 →

Robin Anderson and Jessika Ponchet were the defending champions but both players chose not to participate.

Michaela Bayerlová and Jang Su-jeong won the title, defeating Elysia Bolton and Jamie Loeb in the final, 6–3, 6–2.

== Seeds ==
1. (Netherlands) Arianne Hartono / (Australia) Olivia Tjandramulia (semifinals)
2. (Czech Republic) Michaela Bayerlová / (South Korea) Jang Su-jeong (champions)
3. (Australia) Elysia Bolton / (United States) Jamie Loeb (final)
4. (Hong Kong) Eudice Chong / (Chinese Taipei) Liang En-shuo (semifinals)

== Draw ==
=== Key ===
- Q = Qualifier
- WC = Wild card
- LL = Lucky loser
- Alt = Alternate
- SE = Special exempt
- PR = Protected ranking
- ITF = ITF entry
- JE = Junior exempt
- w/o = Walkover
- r = Retired
- d = Defaulted
- SR = Special ranking

=== Draw ===
First round
1	(Netherlands) A Hartono (Australia) O Tjandramulia	6	6
(Mexico) MF Navarro (United States) A Ulyashchenko	2	3
(United States) P Corley (Slovakia) A Rusová	6^{5}	7^{7}	[13]
(Canada) K Cross (Canada) A Xu	7^{7}	6^{5}	[11]
3	(Australia) E Bolton (United States) J Loeb	6	6
(Serbia) K Jokić (United States) R McAdoo	3	3
(Canada) S Nicholson (Canada) A Xie	0	6^{2}
(United States) J Hart (United States) D Hewitt	6	7^{7}
(Canada) N Akinbiyi (Canada) A Grubor	2	2
(Canada) E Daniels (Canada) L Sleeth	6	6
(Slovakia) V Morvayová (Czech Republic) A Sisková	4	6	[9]
4	(Hong Kong) E Chong (Chinese Taipei) E-s Liang	6	2	[11]
(United States) F Di Lorenzo (United Kingdom) SB Grey	6	6
(United States) C Ansari (Canada) A Arseneault	3	3
(Poland) O Lincer (Denmark) J Svendsen	4	2
2	(Czech Republic) M Bayerlová (South Korea) S-j Jang	6	6

Quarterfinals
1	(Netherlands) A Hartono (Australia) O Tjandramulia	7	6
(United States) P Corley (Slovakia) A Rusová	5	0
3	(Australia) E Bolton (United States) J Loeb	6	6
(United States) J Hart (United States) D Hewitt	2	4
(Canada) E Daniels (Canada) L Sleeth
4	(Hong Kong) E Chong (Chinese Taipei) E-s Liang	w/o
(United States) F Di Lorenzo (United Kingdom) SB Grey	3	6	[3]
2	(Czech Republic) M Bayerlová (South Korea) S-j Jang	6	4	[10]

Semifinals
1	(Netherlands) A Hartono (Australia) O Tjandramulia	6^{4}	6	[3]
3	(Australia) E Bolton (United States) J Loeb	7^{7}	4	[10]
4	(Hong Kong) E Chong (Chinese Taipei) E-s Liang	4	4
2	(Czech Republic) M Bayerlová (South Korea) S-j Jang	6	6

Final
3	(Australia) E Bolton (United States) J Loeb	3	2
2	(Czech Republic) M Bayerlová (South Korea) S-j Jang	6	6
