= 2014 Tevlin Women's Challenger =

- Date: October 27 – November 2
- Edition: 10th
- Category: ITF Women's Circuit
- Prize money: US$50,000
- Surface: Hard – indoors
- Location: Toronto, Ontario, Canada
- Venue: Rexall Centre

Champions

Singles
- (Canada) Gabriela Dabrowski

Doubles
- (United States) Maria Sanchez / (United States) Taylor Townsend
← 2013 ·	Tevlin Women's Challenger	· 2015 →

The 2014 Tevlin Women's Challenger was a professional tennis tournament played on indoor hard courts. It was the 10th edition of the tournament and part of the 2014 ITF Women's Circuit, offering a total of $50,000 in prize money. It took place in Toronto, Ontario, Canada between October 27 and November 2, 2014.

== Singles main-draw entrants ==
=== Seeds ===
Country	Player	Rank^{1}	Seed
USA	Taylor Townsend	108	1
SRB	Jovana Jakšić	122	2
SUI	Romina Oprandi	123	3
BEL	An-Sophie Mestach	131	4
ISR	Julia Glushko	156	5
CAN	Françoise Abanda	178	6
CAN	Heidi El Tabakh	186	7
CAN	Gabriela Dabrowski	198	8

- ^{1} Rankings are as of October 20, 2014

=== Other entrants ===
The following players received wildcards into the singles main draw:

- (Canada) Ayan Broomfield
- (Canada) Rosie Johanson
- (Canada) Katherine Sebov
- (Hungary) Fanni Stollár

The following players received entry from the qualifying draw:

- (Czech Republic) Marie Bouzková
- (Germany) Kim Grajdek
- (Serbia) Marina Kačar
- (United States) Alexandra Stevenson

== Champions ==
=== Singles ===
- (Canada) Gabriela Dabrowski def. (United States) Maria Sanchez, 6–4, 2–6, 7–6^{(9–7)}

=== Doubles ===
- (United States) Maria Sanchez / (United States) Taylor Townsend def. (Canada) Gabriela Dabrowski / (Germany) Tatjana Maria, 7–5, 4–6, [15–13]
