= 2016 Tevlin Women's Challenger – Singles =

Singles
- 2016 Tevlin Women's Challenger

Final
- Champion: (United States) Catherine Bellis
- Runner-up: (Czech Republic) Jesika Malečková
- Score: 6–2, 1–6, 6–3

Events
Singles	Doubles
← 2015 ·	Tevlin Women's Challenger	· 2017 →

Tatjana Maria was the defending champion, but decided not to participate this year.

Catherine Bellis won the title, defeating Jesika Malečková 6–2, 1–6, 6–3 in the final

== Seeds ==
1. (United States) Catherine Bellis (champion)
2. (Belgium) Elise Mertens (semifinals)
3. (Canada) Françoise Abanda (second round)
4. (Czech Republic) Jesika Malečková (final)
5. (United Kingdom) Laura Robson (first round)
6. (Serbia) Jovana Jakšić (first round)
7. (United States) Lauren Albanese (first round)
8. (Netherlands) Michaëlla Krajicek (first round)

== Draw ==
=== Key ===
- Q = Qualifier
- WC = Wild card
- LL = Lucky loser
- Alt = Alternate
- SE = Special exempt
- PR = Protected ranking
- ITF = ITF entry
- JE = Junior exempt
- w/o = Walkover
- r = Retired
- d = Defaulted
- SR = Special ranking

=== Finals ===
Semifinals
1	(United States) Catherine Bellis	6	1	6
(United States) Raveena Kingsley	3	6	1
4	(Czech Republic) Jesika Malečková	6	6
2	(Belgium) Elise Mertens	2	3

Final
1	(United States) Catherine Bellis	6	1	6
4	(Czech Republic) Jesika Malečková	2	6	3

=== Top half ===
First round
1	(United States) C Bellis	6	6
(United States) UM Arconada	4	2
Q	(Canada) K Sebov	6	6
WC	(United States) C Branstine	1	3
(United States) M Sanchez	0	3
(France) T Andrianjafitrimo	6	6
(Germany) L Schaeder	6	6
6	(Serbia) J Jakšić	4	4
3	(Canada) F Abanda	7^{9}	6
Q	(United States) E Bektas	6^{7}	3
JE	(Canada) B Andreescu	6^{3}	6	6
WC	(Canada) G Dabrowski	7^{7}	3	4
(Austria) P König	2	4
(United States) R Kingsley	6	6
(Czech Republic) M Bouzková	4	6	7^{9}
8	(Netherlands) M Krajicek	6	4	6^{7}

Second round
1	(United States) C Bellis	5	6	6
Q	(Canada) K Sebov	7	1	1
(France) T Andrianjafitrimo	6	6
(Germany) L Schaeder	2	4
3	(Canada) F Abanda	3	6	2
JE	(Canada) B Andreescu	6	3	6
(United States) R Kingsley	2	6	7
(Czech Republic) M Bouzková	6	3	5

Quarterfinals
1	(United States) C Bellis	4	6	6
(France) T Andrianjafitrimo	6	4	1
JE	(Canada) B Andreescu	1	4
(United States) R Kingsley	6	6

Semifinals
1	(United States) C Bellis	6	1	6
(United States) R Kingsley	3	6	1

=== Bottom half ===
First round
7	(United States) L Albanese	4	6	4
(United States) N Frenkel	6	4	6
WC	(Canada) L Sleeth	6	4	1
(Mexico) R Zarazúa	2	6	6
WC	(Canada) C Robillard-Millette	2	4
(Hungary) F Stollár	6	6
(United Kingdom) K Swan	6	2^{r}
4	(Czech Republic) J Malečková	4	5
5	(United Kingdom) L Robson	3	6	4
(United States) J Wacnik	6	2	6
Q	(United States) R Yurovsky	6	2	6
(Canada) C Zhao	1	6	2
(Romania) M Buzărnescu	2	5
Q	(United States) J Elbaba	6	7
(United States) C Whoriskey	0	4
2	(Belgium) E Mertens	6	6

Second round
(United States) N Frenkel	4	6	7^{7}
(Mexico) R Zarazúa	6	4	6^{4}
(Hungary) F Stollár	5	1
4	(Czech Republic) J Malečková	7	6
(United States) J Wacnik	2	6^{5}
Q	(United States) R Yurovsky	6	7^{7}
Q	(United States) J Elbaba	3	3
2	(Belgium) E Mertens	6	6

Quarterfinals
(United States) N Frenkel	1	2
4	(Czech Republic) J Malečková	6	6
Q	(United States) R Yurovsky	6	3	1
2	(Belgium) E Mertens	2	6	6

Semifinals
4	(Czech Republic) J Malečková	6	6
2	(Belgium) E Mertens	2	3
