= 2018 Tevlin Women's Challenger – Doubles =

Doubles
- 2018 Tevlin Women's Challenger

Final
- Champions: (Canada) Sharon Fichman (United States) Maria Sanchez
- Runners-up: (Poland) Maja Chwalińska (Bulgaria) Elitsa Kostova
- Score: 6–0, 6–4

Events
Singles	Doubles
← 2017 ·	Tevlin Women's Challenger	· 2019 →

Alexa Guarachi and Erin Routliffe were the defending champions, but both players chose not to participate.

Sharon Fichman and Maria Sanchez won the title after defeating Maja Chwalińska and Elitsa Kostova 6–0, 6–4 in the final.

== Seeds ==
1. (United Kingdom) Naomi Broady / (Japan) Ayaka Okuno (semifinals)
2. (United States) Usue Maitane Arconada / (United States) Jacqueline Cako (first round, retired)
3. (United Kingdom) Tara Moore / (Switzerland) Conny Perrin (quarterfinals)
4. (France) Jessika Ponchet / (Belgium) Kimberley Zimmermann (first round)

== Draw ==
=== Key ===
- Q = Qualifier
- WC = Wild card
- LL = Lucky loser
- Alt = Alternate
- SE = Special exempt
- PR = Protected ranking
- ITF = ITF entry
- JE = Junior exempt
- w/o = Walkover
- r = Retired
- d = Defaulted
- SR = Special ranking

=== Draw ===
First round
1	(United Kingdom) N Broady (Japan) A Okuno	6	6
WC	(Canada) N Akinbiyi (Canada) A Chang	1	2
(United States) L Guillermo (United States) J Ho	7	6
(Canada) P Januskova (United States) R McAdoo	5	1
4	(France) J Ponchet (Belgium) K Zimmermann	5	6^{3}
(France) M Arcangioli (France) S Reix	7	7^{7}
(Poland) M Chwalińska (Bulgaria) E Kostova	6	6
(United States) C Harrison (South Africa) C Simmonds	3	3
WC	(Canada) A Mikhailuk (Canada) L Sleeth	2	1
(Romania) E Bogdan (Romania) A Cadanțu	6	6
WC	(Canada) A Arseneault (Canada) L Kwong	1	4
3	(United Kingdom) T Moore (Switzerland) C Perrin	6	6
(United States) A Parks (United States) A Riley	2	1
(United States) R Anderson (United States) E Bektas	6	6
(Canada) S Fichman (United States) M Sanchez	6	0
2	(United States) UM Arconada (United States) J Cako	3	0^{r}

Quarterfinals
1	(United Kingdom) N Broady (Japan) A Okuno	6	4	[10]
(United States) L Guillermo (United States) J Ho	4	6	[8]
(France) M Arcangioli (France) S Reix	1	4
(Poland) M Chwalińska (Bulgaria) E Kostova	6	6
(Romania) E Bogdan (Romania) A Cadanțu	6	7^{7}
3	(United Kingdom) T Moore (Switzerland) C Perrin	3	6^{5}
(United States) R Anderson (United States) E Bektas	4	4
(Canada) S Fichman (United States) M Sanchez	6	6

Semifinals
1	(United Kingdom) N Broady (Japan) A Okuno	1	1
(Poland) M Chwalińska (Bulgaria) E Kostova	6	6
(Romania) E Bogdan (Romania) A Cadanțu	3	4
(Canada) S Fichman (United States) M Sanchez	6	6

Final
(Poland) M Chwalińska (Bulgaria) E Kostova	0	4
(Canada) S Fichman (United States) M Sanchez	6	6
