= 2014 Tevlin Women's Challenger – Doubles =

Doubles
- 2014 Tevlin Women's Challenger

Final
- Champions: (United States) Maria Sanchez (United States) Taylor Townsend
- Runners-up: (Canada) Gabriela Dabrowski (Germany) Tatjana Maria
- Score: 7–5, 4–6, [15–13]

Events
Singles	Doubles
- Tevlin Women's Challenger

Françoise Abanda and Victoria Duval were the defending champions, however Duval is still recovering after being diagnosed with Hodgkin's Lymphoma in July. Abanda partnered Marie-Alexandre Leduc, but lost in the quarterfinals to Gabriela Dabrowski and Tatjana Maria.

American-duo Maria Sanchez and Taylor Townsend won the title, defeating Dabrowski and Maria in the final, 7–5, 4–6, [15–13].

== Seeds ==
1. (Canada) Gabriela Dabrowski / (Germany) Tatjana Maria (final)
2. (United States) Maria Sanchez / (United States) Taylor Townsend (champions)
3. (Belgium) Ysaline Bonaventure / (United Kingdom) Nicola Slater (semifinals)
4. (United States) Anamika Bhargava / (United Kingdom) Emily Webley-Smith (quarterfinals)

== Draw ==
Key

- Q = Qualifier
- WC = Wild card
- LL = Lucky loser
- Alt = Alternate
- ITF = ITF entry
- PR = Protected ranking
- SR = Special ranking
- SE = Special exempt
- JE = Junior exempt
- JR = Junior Accelerator Programme entrant
- CO = College Accelerator Programme entrant
- NG = Next Gen Accelerator Program entrant
- w/o = Walkover
- r = Retired
- d = Defaulted

First round
1	(Canada) G Dabrowski (Germany) T Maria	6	6
(Canada) S Molnar (Canada) C Petrick	3	0
(Belgium) A-S Mestach (Brazil) L Pigossi	3^{r}
(Canada) F Abanda (Canada) M-A Leduc	4
3	(Belgium) Y Bonaventure (United Kingdom) N Slater	6	6
(United States) D Mills (Russia) V Savinykh	3	4
(Canada) P Januskova (Canada) M Patrascu	4	2
(Netherlands) C Burger (Poland) J Jegiołka	6	6
WC	(Canada) A Broomfield (Hungary) F Stollár	6	7
WC	(Canada) M Drake (United States) A Stevenson	3	5
WC	(Canada) R Johanson (Canada) K Sebov	2	4
4	(United States) A Bhargava (United Kingdom) E Webley-Smith	6	6
(United States) D Muresan (United States) C Whoriskey	6	7
(France) J Coin (France) C Sibille	4	5
(Israel) J Glushko (Serbia) J Jakšić	0	6	[11]
2	(United States) M Sanchez (United States) T Townsend	6	2	[13]

Quarterfinals
1	(Canada) G Dabrowski (Germany) T Maria	6	6
(Canada) F Abanda (Canada) M-A Leduc	3	4
3	(Belgium) Y Bonaventure (United Kingdom) N Slater	7^{7}	5	[10]
(Netherlands) C Burger (Poland) J Jegiołka	6^{2}	7	[7]
WC	(Canada) A Broomfield (Hungary) F Stollár	6	6^{6}	[11]
4	(United States) A Bhargava (United Kingdom) E Webley-Smith	3	7^{8}	[9]
(United States) D Muresan (United States) C Whoriskey	4	1
2	(United States) M Sanchez (United States) T Townsend	6	6

Semifinals
1	(Canada) G Dabrowski (Germany) T Maria	6	6
3	(Belgium) Y Bonaventure (United Kingdom) N Slater	2	2
WC	(Canada) A Broomfield (Hungary) F Stollár	0	1
2	(United States) M Sanchez (United States) T Townsend	6	6

Final
1	(Canada) G Dabrowski (Germany) T Maria	5	6	[13]
2	(United States) M Sanchez (United States) T Townsend	7	4	[15]
