= 2015 Tevlin Women's Challenger – Singles =

Singles
- 2015 Tevlin Women's Challenger

Final
- Champion: (Germany) Tatjana Maria
- Runner-up: (Serbia) Jovana Jakšić
- Score: 6–3, 6–2

Events
| Singles | Doubles |
| ← 2014 · | Tevlin Women's Challenger | · 2016 → |

Gabriela Dabrowski was the defending champion, but decided not to participate this year.

Tatjana Maria won the title, defeating Jovana Jakšić 6–3, 6–2 in the final.

== Seeds ==
1. (Germany) Tatjana Maria (champion)
2. (United States) Jessica Pegula (first round)
3. (Liechtenstein) Stephanie Vogt (second round)
4. (United States) Samantha Crawford (second round)
5. (Israel) Shahar Pe'er (second round)
6. (United States) Maria Sanchez (quarterfinals)
7. (Netherlands) Michaëlla Krajicek (quarterfinals)
8. (United States) Kristie Ahn (quarterfinals)

== Draw ==
=== Key ===
- Q = Qualifier
- WC = Wild card
- LL = Lucky loser
- Alt = Alternate
- SE = Special exempt
- PR = Protected ranking
- ITF = ITF entry
- JE = Junior exempt
- w/o = Walkover
- r = Retired
- d = Defaulted
- SR = Special ranking

=== Finals ===
Semi-finals
1 | (Germany) Tatjana Maria | 6 | 7
WC | (Canada) Carol Zhao | 2 | 5
(Serbia) Jovana Jakšić | 2 | 7^{11} | 6
(Switzerland) Amra Sadiković | 6 | 6^{9} | 0

Final
1 | (Germany) Tatjana Maria | 6 | 6
(Serbia) Jovana Jakšić | 3 | 2

=== Top half ===
First round
1 | (Germany) T Maria | 6 | 6
WC | (Canada) C Robillard-Millette | 1 | 3
(United States) C Whoriskey | 1 | 3
LL | (India) KK Thandi | 6 | 6
(Belgium) M Benoît | 7^{7} | 6
(Germany) A Lottner | 6^{2} | 2
(Netherlands) Q Lemoine | 6 | 6^{2} | 5
6 | (United States) M Sanchez | 4 | 7^{7} | 7
3 | (Liechtenstein) S Vogt | 6 | 6
(Oman) F Al-Nabhani | 4 | 0
(Canada) H El Tabakh | 6 | 6
(United States) D Lao | 4 | 3
Q | (Japan) M Osaka | 1 | 5
WC | (Canada) C Zhao | 6 | 7
(Canada) S Fichman | 1 | 2
5 | (Israel) S Peer | 6 | 6

Second round
1 | (Germany) T Maria | 6 | 6
LL | (India) KK Thandi | 4 | 3
(Belgium) M Benoît | 7^{7} | 3 | 1
6 | (United States) M Sanchez | 6^{4} | 6 | 6
3 | (Liechtenstein) S Vogt | 4 | 5
(Canada) H El Tabakh | 6 | 7
WC | (Canada) C Zhao | 6 | 6
5 | (Israel) S Peer | 4 | 3

Quarter-finals
1 | (Germany) T Maria | 6 | 6
6 | (United States) M Sanchez | 4 | 3
(Canada) H El Tabakh | 5 | 3
WC | (Canada) C Zhao | 7 | 6

Semi-finals
1 | (Germany) T Maria | 6 | 7
WC | (Canada) C Zhao | 2 | 5

=== Bottom half ===
First round
8 | (United States) K Ahn | 6 | 6
Q | (Norway) U Eikeri | 3 | 2
(Canada) F Abanda | 6 | 6
Q | (Canada) I Boulais | 2 | 1
(Australia) O Rogowska | 0 | 6 | 1
(Serbia) J Jakšić | 6 | 3 | 6
(Belgium) K Liebens | 2 | 2
4 | (United States) S Crawford | 6 | 6
7 | (Netherlands) M Krajicek | 6^{4} | 6 | 6
(Czech Republic) B Štefková | 7^{7} | 4 | 4
WC | (Canada) B Andreescu | 0 | 2
(Romania) M Buzărnescu | 6 | 6
(Switzerland) A Sadiković | 6 | 6
WC | (Hungary) F Stollár | 1 | 4
Q | (Netherlands) E Wacanno | 7^{7} | 7
2 | (United States) J Pegula | 6^{4} | 5

Second round
8 | (United States) K Ahn | 7 | 6
(Canada) F Abanda | 5 | 1
(Serbia) J Jakšić | 7^{7} | 6
4 | (United States) S Crawford | 6^{4} | 3
7 | (Netherlands) M Krajicek | 6 | 6
(Romania) M Buzărnescu | 0 | 3
(Switzerland) A Sadiković | 6 | 7^{7}
Q | (Netherlands) E Wacanno | 3 | 6^{2}

Quarter-finals
8 | (United States) K Ahn | 3 | 0
(Serbia) J Jakšić | 6 | 6
7 | (Netherlands) M Krajicek | 3 | 2
(Switzerland) A Sadiković | 6 | 6

Semi-finals
(Serbia) J Jakšić | 2 | 7^{11} | 6
(Switzerland) A Sadiković | 6 | 6^{9} | 0
