= 2023 Tevlin Women's Challenger – Singles =

Singles
- 2023 Tevlin Women's Challenger

Final
- Champion: (Canada) Marina Stakusic
- Runner-up: (Croatia) Jana Fett
- Score: 3–6, 7–5, 6–3

Events
Singles	Doubles
← 2022 ·	Tevlin Women's Challenger	· 2024 →

Robin Anderson was the defending champion but lost in the first round to Louisa Chirico.

Marina Stakusic won the title, defeating Jana Fett in the final, 3–6, 7–5, 6–3.

== Seeds ==
1. (Canada) Katherine Sebov (withdrew)
2. (Australia) Arina Rodionova (quarterfinals)
3. (Croatia) Jana Fett (final)
4. (Switzerland) Lulu Sun (quarterfinals)
5. (Netherlands) Lesley Pattinama Kerkhove (first round)
6. (Japan) Haruka Kaji (quarterfinals)
7. (United States) Louisa Chirico (quarterfinals)
8. (Lithuania) Justina Mikulskytė (semifinals)

== Draw ==
Key

- Q = Qualifier
- WC = Wild card
- LL = Lucky loser
- Alt = Alternate
- ITF = ITF entry
- PR = Protected ranking
- SR = Special ranking
- SE = Special exempt
- JE = Junior exempt
- JR = Junior Accelerator Programme entrant
- CO = College Accelerator Programme entrant
- NG = Next Gen Accelerator Program entrant
- w/o = Walkover
- r = Retired
- d = Defaulted

=== Finals ===
Semifinals
(Canada) Victoria Mboko	2	0
3	(Croatia) Jana Fett	6	6
(Canada) Marina Stakusic	6	6
8	(Lithuania) Justina Mikulskytė	3	3

Final
3	(Croatia) Jana Fett	6	5	3
(Canada) Marina Stakusic	3	7	6

=== Top half ===
First round
Q	(United States) D Hewitt	6^{3}	6	1
(Canada) V Mboko	7^{7}	3	6
(Canada) C Brace	5	7^{7}	6^{4}
(Denmark) J Svendsen	7	6^{3}	7^{7}
(Poland) U Radwańska	3	6	6
Q	(United States) A Markham	6	0	4
WC	(Canada) K Cross	4	3
6	(Japan) H Kaji	6	6
3	(Croatia) J Fett	6	3	6
WC	(Canada) A Arseneault	2	6	3
(United States) M Sieg	6	1	6
Q	(United States) A Ulyashchenko	1	6	0
Q	(United States) T Kinard	2	7	1
WC	(Canada) L Sleeth	6	5	6
(United States) R Anderson	6^{3}	4
7	(United States) L Chirico	7^{7}	6

Second round
(Canada) V Mboko	7^{7}	6
(Denmark) J Svendsen	6^{4}	1
(Poland) U Radwańska	6	2	3
6	(Japan) H Kaji	4	6	6
3	(Croatia) J Fett	6	6
(United States) M Sieg	0	2
WC	(Canada) L Sleeth	2	4
7	(United States) L Chirico	6	6

Quarterfinals
(Canada) V Mboko	4	7^{7}	6
6	(Japan) H Kaji	6	6^{4}	2
3	(Croatia) J Fett	7^{7}	6
7	(United States) L Chirico	6^{5}	4

Semifinals
(Canada) V Mboko	2	0
3	(Croatia) J Fett	6	6

=== Bottom half ===
First round
5	(Netherlands) L Pattinama Kerkhove	5	4
(United Kingdom) E Silva	7	6
(Canada) M Stakusic	6	6
Q	(United Kingdom) T William	0	0
(Hungary) F Stollár	6	6
LL	(United States) P Corley	1	2
Q	(Serbia) K Jokić	2	1
4	(Switzerland) L Sun	6	6
8	(Lithuania) J Mikulskytė	6	6
(Japan) N Hanatani	1	2
Q	(France) C Roméo	6	3	4
JE	(United States) L Hovde	4	6	6
Q	(Poland) O Lincer	2	6^{7}
(United Kingdom) SB Grey	6	7^{9}
WC	(Canada) I Boulais	6	6^{5}	4
2	(Australia) Ar Rodionova	3	7^{7}	6

Second round
(United Kingdom) E Silva	6	1	4
(Canada) M Stakusic	4	6	6
(Hungary) F Stollár	4	2
4	(Switzerland) L Sun	6	6
8	(Lithuania) J Mikulskytė	4	6	7
JE	(United States) L Hovde	6	0	5
(United Kingdom) SB Grey	4	6^{4}
2	(Australia) Ar Rodionova	6	7^{7}

Quarterfinals
(Canada) M Stakusic	4	7^{7}	6
4	(Switzerland) L Sun	6	6^{5}	4
8	(Lithuania) J Mikulskytė	6	6
2	(Australia) Ar Rodionova	3	3

Semifinals
(Canada) M Stakusic	6	6
8	(Lithuania) J Mikulskytė	3	3
