= 2025 Tevlin Women's Challenger – Singles =

Singles
- 2025 Tevlin Women's Challenger

Final
- Champion: (United Kingdom) Harriet Dart
- Runner-up: (United States) Fiona Crawley
- Score: 6–2, 6–2

Events
Singles	Doubles
← 2024 ·	Tevlin Women's Challenger	· 2026 →

Harriet Dart won the title, defeating Fiona Crawley in the final, 6–2, 6–2.

Louisa Chirico was the defending champion, but lost in the quarterfinals to Crawley.

== Seeds ==
1. (United States) Louisa Chirico (quarterfinals)
2. (Netherlands) Anouk Koevermans (second round)
3. (United Kingdom) Harriet Dart (champion)
4. (Canada) Kayla Cross (semifinals)
5. (Slovakia) Viktória Hrunčáková (quarterfinals)
6. (France) Julie Belgraver (second round)
7. (United States) Kayla Day (first round)
8. (Canada) Katherine Sebov (semifinals)

== Draw ==
Key

- Q = Qualifier
- WC = Wild card
- LL = Lucky loser
- Alt = Alternate
- ITF = ITF entry
- PR = Protected ranking
- SR = Special ranking
- SE = Special exempt
- JE = Junior exempt
- JR = Junior Accelerator Programme entrant
- CO = College Accelerator Programme entrant
- NG = Next Gen Accelerator Program entrant
- w/o = Walkover
- r = Retired
- d = Defaulted

=== Finals ===
Semifinals
(United States) Fiona Crawley	7	3	6
4	(Canada) Kayla Cross	5	6	2
3	(United Kingdom) Harriet Dart	6	6
8	(Canada) Katherine Sebov	4	0

Final
(United States) Fiona Crawley	2	2
3	(United Kingdom) Harriet Dart	6	6

=== Top half ===
First round
1	(United States) L Chirico	6	7^{7}
Q	(United States) K Collins	3	6^{3}
WC	(Canada) T Chavez	3	0
(United States) O Lincer	6	6
Q	(United States) R McAdoo	7^{7}	6
A Tikhonova	6^{5}	4
(United States) F Crawley	6	6
7	(United States) K Day	1	2
4	(Canada) K Cross	2	6	6
(Japan) A Koshiishi	6	2	3
WC	(Canada) D Plekhanova	6	1	4
Q	(Canada) A Vagramov	4	6	6
Q	(Netherlands) J Gimbrère	2	2
Q	(United Kingdom) V Allen	6	6
(United States) M Sieg	4	6	1
6	(France) J Belgraver	6	4	6

Second round
1	(United States) L Chirico	6	6
(United States) O Lincer	4	0
Q	(United States) R McAdoo	4	3
(United States) F Crawley	6	6
4	(Canada) K Cross	6	6
Q	(Canada) A Vagramov	3	4
Q	(United Kingdom) V Allen	6	7^{7}
6	(France) J Belgraver	4	6^{5}

Quarterfinals
1	(United States) L Chirico	4	6	4
(United States) F Crawley	6	3	6
4	(Canada) K Cross	6	6
Q	(United Kingdom) V Allen	4	2

Semifinals
(United States) F Crawley	7	3	6
4	(Canada) K Cross	5	6	2

=== Bottom half ===
First round
5	(Slovakia) V Hrunčáková	6	6
Q	(United Kingdom) E Adeshina	3	4
WC	(Canada) A Arseneault	6	6
Q	(United States) D Ivanova	3	2
(United Kingdom) A Rajecki	6	7
(Japan) M Crossley	2	5
(Switzerland) J Dürst	1	3
3	(United Kingdom) H Dart	6	6
8	(Canada) K Sebov	4	6	6
LL	(Canada) A Tabunshchyk	6	1	4
(Japan) H Arakawa	6	4	7
WC	(Canada) N Lagaev	0	6	5
Q	(United States) A Markham	6	3
(United States) M Rapolu	0	0^{r}
(Turkey) A Aksu	3	1
2	(Netherlands) A Koevermans	6	6

Second round
5	(Slovakia) V Hrunčáková	6	6
WC	(Canada) A Arseneault	1	4
(United Kingdom) A Rajecki	2	0
3	(United Kingdom) H Dart	6	6
8	(Canada) K Sebov	6	6
(Japan) H Arakawa	1	1
Q	(United States) A Markham	6	6
2	(Netherlands) A Koevermans	1	4

Quarterfinals
5	(Slovakia) V Hrunčáková	4	6	3
3	(United Kingdom) H Dart	6	2	6
8	(Canada) K Sebov	6	6
Q	(United States) A Markham	2	3

Semifinals
3	(United Kingdom) H Dart	6	6
8	(Canada) K Sebov	4	0
