= 2018 Tevlin Women's Challenger =

- Date: 29 October–4 November
- Edition: 14th
- Category: ITF Women's Circuit
- Prize money: $60,000
- Surface: Hard / Indoor
- Location: Toronto, Canada

Champions

Singles
- (Netherlands) Quirine Lemoine

Doubles
- (Canada) Sharon Fichman / (United States) Maria Sanchez
- Tevlin Women's Challenger

The 2018 Tevlin Women's Challenger was a professional tennis tournament played on indoor hard courts. It was the fourteenth edition of the tournament and was part of the 2018 ITF Women's Circuit. It took place in Toronto, Canada, on 29 October–4 November 2018.

== Singles main draw entrants ==
=== Seeds ===
Country	Player	Rank^{1}	Seed
UKR	Kateryna Kozlova	106	1
SUI	Conny Perrin	134	2
NED	Richèl Hogenkamp	159	3
BUL	Elitsa Kostova	200	4
GBR	Naomi Broady	204	5
FRA	Jessika Ponchet	221	6
~~CAN~~	~~Françoise Abanda~~	~~223~~	~~7~~
CAN	Bianca Andreescu	243	8

- ^{1} Rankings as of 22 October 2018.

=== Other entrants ===
The following players received a wildcard into the singles main draw:

- (Canada) Ariana Arseneault
- (Canada) ~~Carson Branstine~~
- (Canada) Louise Kwong
- (Canada) Catherine Leduc

The following player received entry using a protected ranking:

- (Netherlands) Quirine Lemoine

The following player received entry as a special exempt:

- (Ukraine) Daria Lopatetska

The following players received entry from the qualifying draw:

- (Romania) Andreea Ghițescu
- (United States) Nadja Gilchrist
- (United States) ~~Kennedy Shaffer~~
- (Germany) Natalia Siedliska

The following players received entry as lucky losers:

- (Romania) Alexandra Damaschin
- (United States) Tori Kinard
- (United States) Pamela Montez

== Champions ==
=== Singles ===
- (Netherlands) Quirine Lemoine def. (Ukraine) Kateryna Kozlova, 6–2, 6–3

=== Doubles ===
- (Canada) Sharon Fichman / (United States) Maria Sanchez def. (Poland) Maja Chwalińska / (Bulgaria) Elitsa Kostova, 6–0, 6–4
