= 2025 Tevlin Women's Challenger =

Tennis tournament

- Date: October 27–November 2, 2025
- Edition: 19th
- Category: ITF Women's World Tennis Tour
- Prize money: $60,000
- Surface: Hard / Indoor
- Location: Toronto, Canada

Champions

Singles
- (United Kingdom) Harriet Dart

Doubles
- (Slovakia) Viktória Hrunčáková / Anastasia Tikhonova
- Tevlin Women's Challenger

The 2025 Tevlin Women's Challenger was a professional tennis tournament played on indoor hard courts. It was the nineteenth edition of the tournament which is part of the 2025 ITF Women's World Tennis Tour. It took place in Toronto, Canada between October 27 and November 2, 2025.

== Champions ==
=== Singles ===
- (United Kingdom) Harriet Dart def. (United States) Fiona Crawley, 6–2, 6–2

=== Doubles ===
- (Slovakia) Viktória Hrunčáková / Anastasia Tikhonova def. (United States) Fiona Crawley / (United States) Jaeda Daniel, 6–4, 6–2

== Singles main draw entrants ==
=== Seeds ===
| Country | Player | Rank^{1} | Seed |
|---|---|---|---|
| USA | Louisa Chirico | 158 | 1 |
| NED | Anouk Koevermans | 184 | 2 |
| GBR | Harriet Dart | 220 | 3 |
| CAN | Kayla Cross | 226 | 4 |
| SVK | Viktória Hrunčáková | 227 | 5 |
| FRA | Julie Belgraver | 272 | 6 |
| USA | Kayla Day | 275 | 7 |
| CAN | Katherine Sebov | 276 | 8 |

- ^{1} Rankings are as of 20 October 2025.

=== Other entrants ===
The following players received wildcards into the singles main draw:

- (Canada) Ariana Arseneault
- (Canada) Teah Chavez
- (Canada) Nadia Lagaev
- (Canada) Dasha Plekhanova

The following players received entry from the qualifying draw:

- (United Kingdom) Esther Adeshina
- (United Kingdom) Victoria Allen
- (United States) Kylie Collins
- (Netherlands) Jasmijn Gimbrère
- (United States) Dasha Ivanova
- (United States) Ava Markham
- (United States) Rasheeda McAdoo
- (Canada) Alexandra Vagramov

The following player received entry as a lucky loser:

- (Canada) Anna Tabunshchyk
