= 2014 Tevlin Women's Challenger – Singles =

Singles
- 2014 Tevlin Women's Challenger

Final
- Champion: (Canada) Gabriela Dabrowski
- Runner-up: (United States) Maria Sanchez
- Score: 6–4, 2–6, 7–6^{(9–7)}

Events
Singles	Doubles
← 2013 ·	Tevlin Women's Challenger	· 2015 →

Victoria Duval was the defending champion, but was still recovering after being diagnosed with Hodgkin's Lymphoma in July.

Gabriela Dabrowski won the title, defeating Maria Sanchez in the final, 6–4, 2–6, 7–6^{(9–7)}.

== Seeds ==
1. (United States) Taylor Townsend (semifinals)
2. (Serbia) Jovana Jakšić (first round)
3. (Switzerland) Romina Oprandi (quarterfinals)
4. (Belgium) An-Sophie Mestach (first round)
5. (Israel) Julia Glushko (quarterfinals)
6. (Canada) Françoise Abanda (first round)
7. (Canada) Heidi El Tabakh (second round; retired)
8. (Canada) Gabriela Dabrowski (champion)

== Main draw ==
Key

- Q = Qualifier
- WC = Wild card
- LL = Lucky loser
- Alt = Alternate
- ITF = ITF entry
- PR = Protected ranking
- SR = Special ranking
- SE = Special exempt
- JE = Junior exempt
- JR = Junior Accelerator Programme entrant
- CO = College Accelerator Programme entrant
- NG = Next Gen Accelerator Program entrant
- w/o = Walkover
- r = Retired
- d = Defaulted

=== Finals ===
Semifinals
1	(United States) Taylor Townsend	6^{3}	3
(United States) Maria Sanchez	7^{7}	6
8	(Canada) Gabriela Dabrowski	6	6
(Germany) Tatjana Maria	4	3

Final
(United States) Maria Sanchez	4	6	6^{7}
8	(Canada) Gabriela Dabrowski	6	2	7^{9}

=== Top half ===
First round
1	(United States) T Townsend	6	6
WC	(Hungary) F Stollár	2	2
(United Kingdom) E Webley-Smith	6	7
(Belgium) K Liebens	3	5
(Austria) L-M Moser	4	2
(Belgium) Y Bonaventure	6	6
(Brazil) L Pigossi	0	2
5	(Israel) J Glushko	6	6
3	(Switzerland) R Oprandi	7^{7}	6^{4}	6
Q	(Serbia) M Kačar	6^{1}	7^{7}	2
Q	(United States) A Stevenson	4	6^{5}
(France) J Coin	6	7^{7}
WC	(Canada) A Broomfield	7^{8}	1	1
(United States) M Sanchez	6^{6}	6	6
(Italy) J Paolini	6	6
6	(Canada) F Abanda	3	1

Second round
1	(United States) T Townsend	6	6
(United Kingdom) E Webley-Smith	3	1
(Belgium) Y Bonaventure	1	2
5	(Israel) J Glushko	6	6
3	(Switzerland) R Oprandi	5	6	6
(France) J Coin	7	1	1
(United States) M Sanchez	6	6
(Italy) J Paolini	4	3

Quarterfinals
1	(United States) T Townsend	6	6
5	(Israel) J Glushko	1	1
3	(Switzerland) R Oprandi	2	0^{r}
(United States) M Sanchez	6	0

Semifinals
1	(United States) T Townsend	6^{3}	3
(United States) M Sanchez	7^{7}	6

=== Bottom half ===
First round
8	(Canada) G Dabrowski	6	7^{7}
WC	(Canada) K Sebov	2	6^{4}
(Germany) N Zander	4	3
(Russia) V Savinykh	6	6
WC	(Canada) R Johanson	3	4
(France) C Sibille	6	6
(United States) C Whoriskey	7	4	6
4	(Belgium) A-S Mestach	5	6	4
7	(Canada) H El Tabakh	6	2
Q	(Germany) K Grajdek	0	1^{r}
Q	(Czech Republic) M Bouzková	4	6	6
(Poland) J Jegiołka	6	2	4
(Liechtenstein) S Vogt	6	3	6
(Netherlands) C Burger	4	6	4
(Germany) T Maria	7	6
2	(Serbia) J Jakšić	5	1

Second round
8	(Canada) G Dabrowski	6	5	6
(Russia) V Savinykh	3	7	1
(France) C Sibille	3	4
(United States) C Whoriskey	6	6
7	(Canada) H El Tabakh	1	0^{r}
Q	(Czech Republic) M Bouzková	6	3
(Liechtenstein) S Vogt	4	4
(Germany) T Maria	6	6

Quarterfinals
8	(Canada) G Dabrowski	7^{8}	6
(United States) C Whoriskey	6^{6}	3
Q	(Czech Republic) M Bouzková	4	4
(Germany) T Maria	6	6

Semifinals
8	(Canada) G Dabrowski	6	6
(Germany) T Maria	4	3
