= 2017 Tevlin Women's Challenger =

- Date: October 30 – November 5
- Edition: 13th
- Category: ITF Women's Circuit
- Prize money: US$60,000
- Surface: Hard – indoors
- Location: Toronto, Ontario, Canada
- Venue: Aviva Centre

Champions

Singles
- (Belgium) Ysaline Bonaventure

Doubles
- (Chile) Alexa Guarachi / (New Zealand) Erin Routliffe
- Tevlin Women's Challenger

The 2017 Tevlin Women's Challenger was a professional tennis tournament played on indoor hard courts. It was the 13th edition of the tournament and part of the 2017 ITF Women's Circuit, offering a total of $50,000 in prize money. It took place in Toronto, Ontario, Canada between October 30 and November 5, 2017.

== Singles main-draw entrants ==
=== Seeds ===
Country	Player	Rank^{1}	Seed
JPN	Risa Ozaki	96	1
SUI	Patty Schnyder	160	2
CAN	Bianca Andreescu	177	3
NED	Bibiane Schoofs	227	4
CAN	Carol Zhao	229	5
MEX	Victoria Rodríguez	234	6
SUI	Amra Sadiković	254	7
BEL	Ysaline Bonaventure	255	8

- ^{1} Rankings are as of October 23, 2017

=== Other entrants ===
The following players received wildcards into the singles main draw:

- (Canada) Petra Januskova
- (Canada) Catherine Leduc
- (United States) Ann Li
- (New Zealand) Erin Routliffe

The following player entered the singles main draw with a protected ranking:

- (Belgium) Ysaline Bonaventure

The following players received entry into the singles main draw by special exempts:

- (Hungary) Gréta Arn
- (China) Xu Shilin

The following players received entry from the qualifying draw:

- (Russia) Elena Bovina
- (United States) Safiya Carrington
- (Belgium) Tamaryn Hendler
- (United States) Kennedy Shaffer

== Champions ==
=== Singles ===
- (Belgium) Ysaline Bonaventure def. (Switzerland) Patty Schnyder, 7–6^{(7–3)}, 6–3

=== Doubles ===
- (Chile) Alexa Guarachi / (New Zealand) Erin Routliffe def. (Belgium) Ysaline Bonaventure / (Mexico) Victoria Rodríguez, 7–6^{(7–4)}, 3–6, [10–4]
