= 2019 Tevlin Women's Challenger – Doubles =

Doubles
- 2019 Tevlin Women's Challenger

Final
- Champions: (United States) Robin Anderson (France) Jessika Ponchet
- Runners-up: (Canada) Mélodie Collard (Canada) Leylah Annie Fernandez
- Score: 7–6^{(9–7)}, 6–2

Events
Singles	Doubles
← 2018 ·	Tevlin Women's Challenger	· 2022 →

Sharon Fichman and Maria Sanchez were the defending champions, but chose not to participate.

Robin Anderson and Jessika Ponchet won the title, defeating Mélodie Collard and Leylah Annie Fernandez 7–6^{(9–7)}, 6–2 in the final.

== Seeds ==
1. (United Kingdom) Naomi Broady / (United States) Hayley Carter (quarterfinals, retired)
2. (Netherlands) Bibiane Schoofs / (Hungary) Fanny Stollár (quarterfinals)
3. (United States) Quinn Gleason / (United Kingdom) Samantha Murray (first round)
4. (United States) Robin Anderson / (France) Jessika Ponchet (champions)

== Draw ==
=== Key ===
- Q = Qualifier
- WC = Wild card
- LL = Lucky loser
- Alt = Alternate
- SE = Special exempt
- PR = Protected ranking
- ITF = ITF entry
- JE = Junior exempt
- w/o = Walkover
- r = Retired
- d = Defaulted
- SR = Special ranking

=== Draw ===
First round
1	(United Kingdom) N Broady (United States) H Carter	6	5	[11]
(United States) F Di Lorenzo (New Zealand) E Routliffe	4	7	[9]
(Netherlands) A Hartono (Australia) O Tjandramulia	2	5
(United States) E Bektas (United Kingdom) T Moore	6	7
4	(United States) R Anderson (France) J Ponchet	7	6
Alt	(United States) M Kobelt (United States) S Lee	5	4
(Switzerland) T Sugnaux (Belgium) K Zimmermann	1	6	[9]
(Canada) F Abanda (United States) S Vickery	6	4	[11]
WC	(Canada) A Arseneault (Canada) J Bui	2	6	[7]
WC	(Canada) M Kupres (Canada) M Stakusic	6	4	[10]
(United States) C Harrison (Thailand) P Plipuech	6	6^{1}	[10]
3	(United States) Q Gleason (United Kingdom) S Murray	0	7^{7}	[6]
WC	(Canada) M Collard (Canada) LA Fernandez	6	6
(Switzerland) L Küng (Russia) A Morgina	2	3
(Serbia) J Jakšić (United States) R McAdoo	3	1
2	(Netherlands) B Schoofs (Hungary) F Stollár	6	6

Quarterfinals
1	(United Kingdom) N Broady (United States) H Carter	3	7^{7}	[11]^{r}
(United States) E Bektas (United Kingdom) T Moore	6	6^{4}	[11]
4	(United States) R Anderson (France) J Ponchet	w/o
(Canada) F Abanda (United States) S Vickery
WC	(Canada) M Kupres (Canada) M Stakusic
(United States) C Harrison (Thailand) P Plipuech	w/o
WC	(Canada) M Collard (Canada) LA Fernandez	7	3	[10]
2	(Netherlands) B Schoofs (Hungary) F Stollár	5	6	[7]

Semifinals
(United States) E Bektas (United Kingdom) T Moore	2	4
4	(United States) R Anderson (France) J Ponchet	6	6
(United States) C Harrison (Thailand) P Plipuech	3	2
WC	(Canada) M Collard (Canada) LA Fernandez	6	6

Final
4	(United States) R Anderson (France) J Ponchet	7^{9}	6
WC	(Canada) M Collard (Canada) LA Fernandez	6^{7}	2
