= 2015 Tevlin Women's Challenger – Doubles =

Doubles
- 2015 Tevlin Women's Challenger

Final
- Champions: (Canada) Sharon Fichman (United States) Maria Sanchez
- Runners-up: (United States) Kristie Ahn (Hungary) Fanny Stollár
- Score: 6–2, 6–7^{(6–8)}, [10–6]

Events
Singles	Doubles
- Tevlin Women's Challenger

Maria Sanchez and Taylor Townsend were the defending champions, but Townsend decided not to participate this year.

Sanchez partnered with Sharon Fichman and successfully defended her title, defeating Kristie Ahn and Fanny Stollár 6–2, 6–7^{(6–8)}, [10–6] in the final.

== Seeds ==
1. (Canada) Sharon Fichman / (United States) Maria Sanchez (champions)
2. (United States) Samantha Crawford / (United States) Danielle Lao (quarterfinals)
3. (Romania) Mihaela Buzărnescu / (Poland) Justyna Jegiołka (first round)
4. (United States) Jessica Pegula / (Canada) Carol Zhao (semifinals)

== Draw ==
Key

- Q = Qualifier
- WC = Wild card
- LL = Lucky loser
- Alt = Alternate
- ITF = ITF entry
- PR = Protected ranking
- SR = Special ranking
- SE = Special exempt
- JE = Junior exempt
- JR = Junior Accelerator Programme entrant
- CO = College Accelerator Programme entrant
- NG = Next Gen Accelerator Program entrant
- w/o = Walkover
- r = Retired
- d = Defaulted

First round
1	(Canada) S Fichman (United States) M Sanchez	6	6
(Germany) K-A Grajdek (Israel) S Pe'er	3	4
(United States) B Boren (United States) C Whoriskey	1	0
(Oman) F Al-Nabhani (Switzerland) A Sadiković	6	6
4	(United States) J Pegula (Canada) C Zhao	6	6
(Canada) P Januskova (Canada) C Petrick	4	1
WC	(Canada) B Andreescu (Canada) C Robillard-Millette	6	6^{2}	[13]
Alt	(United States) E Clark (Russia) N Kukharchuk	2	7^{7}	[11]
(Canada) F Abanda (Canada) H El Tabakh	6	6
WC	(Canada) I Boulais (Canada) M Patrascu	3	4
(Netherlands) Q Lemoine (Netherlands) E Wacanno	6	6
3	(Romania) M Buzărnescu (Poland) J Jegiołka	3	3
(Belgium) M Benoît (Czech Republic) B Štefková	3	4
(United States) K Ahn (Hungary) F Stollár	6	6
(United States) M Kobelt (Moldova) A Perper	7	2	[10]
2	(United States) S Crawford (United States) D Lao	5	6	[12]

Quarterfinals
1	(Canada) S Fichman (United States) M Sanchez	6	6
(Oman) F Al-Nabhani (Switzerland) A Sadiković	2	1
4	(United States) J Pegula (Canada) C Zhao	6	6
WC	(Canada) B Andreescu (Canada) C Robillard-Millette	1	0
(Canada) F Abanda (Canada) H El Tabakh	6	6
(Netherlands) Q Lemoine (Netherlands) E Wacanno	0	2
(United States) K Ahn (Hungary) F Stollár	7^{7}	6
2	(United States) S Crawford (United States) D Lao	6^{4}	2

Semifinals
1	(Canada) S Fichman (United States) M Sanchez	7^{7}	3	[10]
4	(United States) J Pegula (Canada) C Zhao	6^{5}	6	[2]
(Canada) F Abanda (Canada) H El Tabakh	3	4
(United States) K Ahn (Hungary) F Stollár	6	6

Final
1	(Canada) S Fichman (United States) M Sanchez	6	6^{6}	[10]
(United States) K Ahn (Hungary) F Stollár	2	7^{8}	[6]
