= 2017 Tevlin Women's Challenger – Singles =

Singles
- 2017 Tevlin Women's Challenger

Final
- Champion: (Belgium) Ysaline Bonaventure
- Runner-up: (Switzerland) Patty Schnyder
- Score: 7–6^{(7–3)}, 6–3

Events
| Singles | Doubles |
- Tevlin Women's Challenger

Catherine Bellis was the defending champion, but decided not to participate this year.

Ysaline Bonaventure won the title, defeating Patty Schnyder 7–6^{(7–3)}, 6–3 in the final.

== Seeds ==
1. (Japan) Risa Ozaki (first round)
2. (Switzerland) Patty Schnyder (final)
3. (Canada) Bianca Andreescu (quarterfinals)
4. (Netherlands) Bibiane Schoofs (first round)
5. (Canada) Carol Zhao (second round)
6. (Mexico) Victoria Rodríguez (second round)
7. (Switzerland) Amra Sadiković (first round, retired)
8. (Belgium) Ysaline Bonaventure (champion)

== Draw ==
Key

- Q = Qualifier
- WC = Wild card
- LL = Lucky loser
- Alt = Alternate
- ITF = ITF entry
- PR = Protected ranking
- SR = Special ranking
- SE = Special exempt
- JE = Junior exempt
- JR = Junior Accelerator Programme entrant
- CO = College Accelerator Programme entrant
- NG = Next Gen Accelerator Program entrant
- w/o = Walkover
- r = Retired
- d = Defaulted

=== Finals ===
Semifinals
(France) Jessika Ponchet | 2 | 4
8/PR | (Belgium) Ysaline Bonaventure | 6 | 6
(United States) Francesca Di Lorenzo | 4 | 6 | 3
2 | (Switzerland) Patty Schnyder | 6 | 3 | 6

Final
8/PR | (Belgium) Ysaline Bonaventure | 7^{7} | 6
2 | (Switzerland) Patty Schnyder | 6^{3} | 3

=== Top half ===
First round
1 | (Japan) R Ozaki | 4 | 6 | 2
(Slovakia) M Hončová | 6 | 4 | 6
(United States) R Yurovsky | 6^{2} | 6 | 6
WC | (Canada) C Leduc | 7^{7} | 2 | 2
(France) J Ponchet | 6 | 7^{7}
WC | (New Zealand) E Routliffe | 2 | 6^{5}
(United Kingdom) T Moore | 0 | 4
6 | (Mexico) V Rodríguez | 6 | 6
3 | (Canada) B Andreescu | 3 | 7^{7} | 6
Q | (United States) S Carrington | 6 | 6^{2} | 1
(Belgium) K Zimmermann | 6 | 6
(Belgium) A-S Mestach | 0 | 1
(Russia) V Savinykh | 6 | 6
SE | (China) S Xu | 2 | 0
(Chile) A Guarachi | 6 | 3 | 4
8/PR | (Belgium) Y Bonaventure | 3 | 6 | 6

Second round
(Slovakia) M Hončová | 6 | 6
(United States) R Yurovsky | 0 | 2
(France) J Ponchet | 6 | 6
6 | (Mexico) V Rodríguez | 2 | 2
3 | (Canada) B Andreescu | 6 | 6
(Belgium) K Zimmermann | 4 | 4
(Russia) V Savinykh | 6 | 2 | 3
8/PR | (Belgium) Y Bonaventure | 3 | 6 | 6

Quarterfinals
(Slovakia) M Hončová | 1 | 3
(France) J Ponchet | 6 | 6
3 | (Canada) B Andreescu | 4 | 6 | 3
8/PR | (Belgium) Y Bonaventure | 6 | 3 | 6

Semifinals
(France) J Ponchet | 2 | 4
8/PR | (Belgium) Y Bonaventure | 6 | 6

=== Bottom half ===
First round
5 | (Canada) C Zhao | 6 | 6
(Chinese Taipei) C-y Hsu | 4 | 2
Q | (Belgium) T Hendler | 6 | 6
Q | (United States) K Shaffer | 4 | 3
SE | (Hungary) G Arn | 7^{7} | 6
(Serbia) J Jakšić | 6^{2} | 2
(United States) F Di Lorenzo | 6 | 6
4 | (Netherlands) B Schoofs | 3 | 4
7 | (Switzerland) A Sadiković | 6 | 4 | 0^{r}
(Canada) K Sebov | 4 | 6 | 0
WC | (Canada) P Januskova | 4 | 1
Q | (Russia) E Bovina | 6 | 6
(United States) R Anderson | 6 | 2 | 0^{r}
WC | (United States) A Li | 3 | 6 | 0
(United States) M Sanchez | 6 | 1 | 0
2 | (Switzerland) P Schnyder | 4 | 6 | 6

Second round
5 | (Canada) C Zhao | 6 | 2 | 3
Q | (Belgium) T Hendler | 3 | 6 | 6
SE | (Hungary) G Arn | 4 | 0
(United States) F Di Lorenzo | 6 | 6
(Canada) K Sebov | 3 | 7^{7} | 2
Q | (Russia) E Bovina | 6 | 6^{5} | 6
WC | (United States) A Li | 3 | 7 | 1
2 | (Switzerland) P Schnyder | 6 | 5 | 6

Quarterfinals
Q | (Belgium) T Hendler | 0^{r}
(United States) F Di Lorenzo | 4
Q | (Russia) E Bovina | 2 | 4
2 | (Switzerland) P Schnyder | 6 | 6

Semifinals
(United States) F Di Lorenzo | 4 | 6 | 3
2 | (Switzerland) P Schnyder | 6 | 3 | 6
