= 2018 Tevlin Women's Challenger – Singles =

Singles
- 2018 Tevlin Women's Challenger

Final
- Champion: (Netherlands) Quirine Lemoine
- Runner-up: (Ukraine) Kateryna Kozlova
- Score: 6–2, 6–3

Events
| Singles | Doubles |
- Tevlin Women's Challenger

Ysaline Bonaventure was the defending champion, but chose not to participate.

Quirine Lemoine won the title after defeating Kateryna Kozlova 6–2, 6–3 in the final.

== Seeds ==
1. (Ukraine) Kateryna Kozlova (final)
2. (Switzerland) Conny Perrin (second round)
3. (Netherlands) Richèl Hogenkamp (first round)
4. (Bulgaria) Elitsa Kostova (second round)
5. (United Kingdom) Naomi Broady (second round)
6. (France) Jessika Ponchet (semifinals)
7. (Canada) Françoise Abanda (withdrew)
8. (Canada) Bianca Andreescu (semifinals)

== Draw ==
Key

- Q = Qualifier
- WC = Wild card
- LL = Lucky loser
- Alt = Alternate
- ITF = ITF entry
- PR = Protected ranking
- SR = Special ranking
- SE = Special exempt
- JE = Junior exempt
- JR = Junior Accelerator Programme entrant
- CO = College Accelerator Programme entrant
- NG = Next Gen Accelerator Program entrant
- w/o = Walkover
- r = Retired
- d = Defaulted

=== Finals ===
Semifinals
1 | (Ukraine) Kateryna Kozlova | 7^{7} | 2 | 6
6 | (France) Jessika Ponchet | 6^{3} | 6 | 3
8 | (Canada) Bianca Andreescu | 6 | 4 | 2
PR | (Netherlands) Quirine Lemoine | 3 | 6 | 6

Final
1 | (Ukraine) Kateryna Kozlova | 2 | 3
PR | (Netherlands) Quirine Lemoine | 6 | 6

=== Top half ===
First round
1 | (Ukraine) K Kozlova | 6 | 6
Q | (United States) N Gilchrist | 0 | 0
LL | (United States) T Kinard | 4 | 2
(Romania) A Cadanțu | 6 | 6
(France) S Reix | 6 | 6
WC | (Canada) L Kwong | 3 | 3
(Switzerland) A Sadiković | 6 | 4 | 0^{r}
LL | (United States) P Montez | 4 | 6 | 2
4 | (Bulgaria) E Kostova | 7 | 4 | 6
(Poland) M Chwalińska | 5 | 6 | 3
(United States) E Bektas | 4 | 7 | 3
(Belgium) K Zimmermann | 6 | 5 | 6
(United States) J Cako | 7 | 6
WC | (Canada) A Arseneault | 5 | 4
(United States) M Sanchez | 0 | 1
6 | (France) J Ponchet | 6 | 6

Second round
1 | (Ukraine) K Kozlova | 6 | 3 | 6
(Romania) A Cadanțu | 4 | 6 | 2
(France) S Reix | 0 | 6 | 6
LL | (United States) P Montez | 6 | 3 | 0
4 | (Bulgaria) E Kostova | 2 | 4
(Belgium) K Zimmermann | 6 | 6
(United States) J Cako | 0 | 3
6 | (France) J Ponchet | 6 | 6

Quarterfinals
1 | (Ukraine) K Kozlova | 6 | 4 | 6
(France) S Reix | 2 | 6 | 2
(Belgium) K Zimmermann | 2 | 3
6 | (France) J Ponchet | 6 | 6

Semifinals
1 | (Ukraine) K Kozlova | 7^{7} | 2 | 6
6 | (France) J Ponchet | 6^{3} | 6 | 3

=== Bottom half ===
First round
8 | (Canada) B Andreescu | 6 | 6
(Japan) M Osaka | 1 | 1
(Canada) K Sebov | 6 | 6
Q | (Germany) N Siedliska | 3 | 2
(United States) UM Arconada | 6 | 7
Q | (Romania) A Ghițescu | 3 | 5
(United States) R Anderson | 6 | 4 | 6
3 | (Netherlands) R Hogenkamp | 4 | 6 | 0
5 | (United Kingdom) N Broady | 7 | 6
(France) M Arcangioli | 5 | 2
LL | (Romania) A Damaschin | 6 | 5 | 3
SE | (Ukraine) D Lopatetska | 2 | 7 | 6
PR | (Netherlands) Q Lemoine | 6 | 1
(South Africa) C Simmonds | 1 | 0^{r}
WC | (Canada) C Leduc | 0 | 1
2 | (Switzerland) C Perrin | 6 | 6

Second round
8 | (Canada) B Andreescu | 6 | 2
(Canada) K Sebov | 1 | 0^{r}
(United States) UM Arconada | 1 | 1
(United States) R Anderson | 6 | 6
5 | (United Kingdom) N Broady | 6 | 1 | 4
SE | (Ukraine) D Lopatetska | 1 | 6 | 6
PR | (Netherlands) Q Lemoine | 7^{8} | 7
2 | (Switzerland) C Perrin | 6^{6} | 5

Quarterfinals
8 | (Canada) B Andreescu | 6 | 7^{7}
(United States) R Anderson | 4 | 6^{5}
SE | (Ukraine) D Lopatetska | 0 | 0^{r}
PR | (Netherlands) Q Lemoine | 6 | 2

Semifinals
8 | (Canada) B Andreescu | 6 | 4 | 2
PR | (Netherlands) Q Lemoine | 3 | 6 | 6
