= Jang Su-jeong =

South Korean tennis player (born 1995)

Jang Su-jeong 장수정
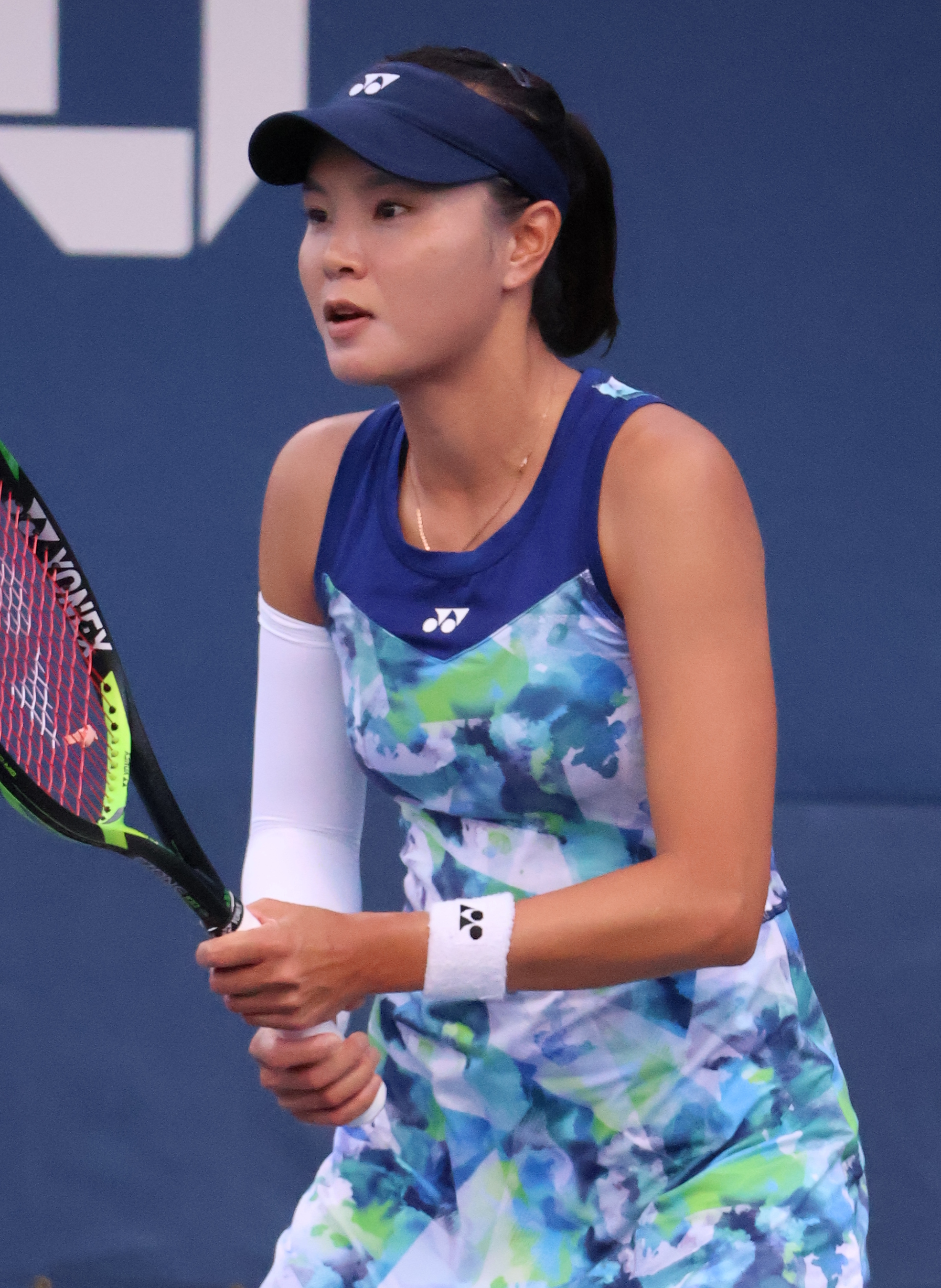
- Jang at the 2023 US Open
- Country (sports): South Korea
- Born: 13 March 1995 (age 31) Busan, South Korea
- Turned pro: 2013
- Retired: 2026
- Plays: Right (two-handed backhand)
- Prize money: $903,043

Singles
- Career record: 431–312
- Career titles: 1 WTA Challenger, 12 ITF
- Highest ranking: No. 114 (11 July 2022)
- Current ranking: No. 659 (29 June 2026)

Grand Slam singles results
- Australian Open: 1R (2022)
- French Open: Q3 (2017)
- Wimbledon: Q3 (2022)
- US Open: Q3 (2017, 2024)

Doubles
- Career record: 194–136
- Career titles: 1 WTA Challenger, 17 ITF
- Highest ranking: No. 82 (22 May 2023)
- Current ranking: No. 945 (29 June 2026)

Team competitions
- Fed Cup: 18–11
- Last updated on: 30 June 2026.

Jang Su-jeong (Korean: 장수정; Hanja: 張修貞; born 13 March 1995) is a South Korean former professional tennis player. On 11 July 2022, she achieved a career-high singles ranking of world No. 114. On 22 May 2023, she peaked at No. 82 in the WTA doubles rankings.

Jang has won one singles and one doubles title on the WTA Challenger Tour. She has also won 12 tournaments in singles and 17 in doubles on the ITF Circuit.

Playing for South Korea in the Billie Jean King Cup, Jang has a win-loss record of 18–11 as of February 2025.

== Career ==
Jang won her first ITF Circuit title in Bundaberg, Australia in March 2013, winning the doubles tournament alongside Lee So-ra, defeating Miki Miyamura and Varatchaya Wongteanchai in the final in three sets.

At the 2013 Korea Open she reached the quarterfinals with a three-set win over Ons Jabeur Jang lost in the last eight to Lara Arruabarrena.

Jang reached her maiden WTA 125 final at the 2017 Hawaii Open, losing to top seed Zhang Shuai in three sets.

She qualified into the singles main draw of the 2022 Australian Open for her major debut, losing in the first round to Danka Kovinić.

Jang won her first WTA 125 title at the 2022 Swedish Open when she defeated Rebeka Masarova in the final.

Alongside You Xiaodi, Jang reached the final at the WTA 125 2022 Argentina Open, losing to Sara Errani and Irina Bara.

Playing with Han Na-lae, she won the doubles title at the WTA 125 2023 Veneto Open, defeating Weronika Falkowska and Katarzyna Piter in the final.

With Eri Hozumi, Jang was runner-up in the doubles at the 2023 Swedish Open, losing to Misaki Doi and Rebecca Peterson in the final.

At the 2023 Korea Open, she defeated fifth seed Sofia Kenin in the first round to record her first win against a top 30 ranked player. She lost her next match to Emina Bektas.

Jang announced her retirement from professional tennis in November 2026.

== Performance timeline ==
Key
W	F	SF	QF	#R	RR	Q#	P#	DNQ	A	Z#	PO	G	S	B	NMS	NTI	P	NH

(W) winner; (F) finalist; (SF) semifinalist; (QF) quarterfinalist; (#R) rounds 4, 3, 2, 1; (RR) round-robin stage; (Q#) qualification round; (P#) preliminary round; (DNQ) did not qualify; (A) absent; (Z#) Davis/Fed Cup Zonal Group (with number indication) or (PO) play-off; (G) gold, (S) silver or (B) bronze Olympic/Paralympic medal; (NMS) not a Masters tournament; (NTI) not a Tier I tournament; (P) postponed; (NH) not held; (SR) strike rate (events won / competed); (W–L) win–loss record.
To avoid confusion and double counting, these charts are updated at the conclusion of a tournament or when the player's participation has ended.

Only main-draw results in WTA Tour, Grand Slam tournaments, Billie Jean King Cup, United Cup, Hopman Cup and Olympic Games are included in win–loss records.

=== Singles ===
Current through the 2024 US Open.

Tournament	2013	2014	2015	2016	2017	2018	2019	2020	2021	2022	2023	2024	W–L
Grand Slam tournaments
Australian Open	A	A	A	Q1	Q2	Q1	A	A	A	1R	Q2	Q2	0–1
French Open	A	A	A	A	Q3	Q1	A	A	A	Q1	Q1	A	0–0
Wimbledon	A	A	Q1	A	Q1	A	A	A	A	Q3	Q1	A	0–0
US Open	A	Q1	A	Q1	Q3	Q1	A	A	A	Q1	Q2	Q3	0–0
Win–loss	0–0	0–0	0–0	0–0	0–0	0–0	0–0	0–0	0–0	0–1	0–0	0–0	0–1
WTA 1000
Qatar Open (Note: The first Premier 5 event of the year has switched back and forth between the Dubai Tennis Championships and the Qatar Ladies Open since 2009 until 2024. Dubai was classified as a Premier 5 event from 2009 to 2011 before being succeeded by Doha for the 2012–2014 period. In 2015, Dubai regained its Premier 5 status while Doha was demoted to Premier status. The Premier 5 tournaments were reclassified as WTA 1000 tournaments in 2021.)	A	A	A	A	A	A	A	A	A	A	A	A	0–0
Dubai Open	A	A	A	A	A	A	A	A	A	A	Q2	A	0–0
Career statistics
Tournaments	1	1	2	3	4	2	0 (Note: During the season, she did not play in the main draw of any tour-level tournaments. However, she played in the Billie Jean King Cup, which is not counted as a played tournament but matches are counted.)	0	0	2	1		16
Overall win-loss	2–1	1–2	1–4	3–6	2–4	0–2	2–1	3–2	0–0	3–2	1–1		18–25

== WTA 125 finals ==
=== Singles: 2 (1 title, 1 runner-up) ===
Result	W–L	Date	Tournament	Surface	Opponent	Score
Loss	0–1	Nov 2017	Hawaii Open, United States	Hard	(China) Zhang Shuai	6–0, 2–6, 3–6
Win	1–1	Jul 2022	Bastad Open, Sweden	Clay	(Spain) Rebeka Masarova	3–6, 6–3, 6–1

=== Doubles: 3 (1 title, 2 runner-ups) ===
Result	W–L	Date	Tournament	Surface	Partner	Opponents	Score
Loss	0–1	Nov 2022	Buenos Aires Open, Argentina	Clay	(China) You Xiaodi	(Romania) Irina Bara (Italy) Sara Errani	1–6, 5–7
Win	1–1	Jun 2023	Veneto Open, Italy	Grass	(South Korea) Han Na-lae	(Poland) Weronika Falkowska (Poland) Katarzyna Piter	6–3, 3–6, [10–6]
Loss	1–2	Jul 2023	Bastad Open, Sweden	Clay	(Japan) Eri Hozumi	Irina Khromacheva (Hungary) Panna Udvardy	6–4, 3–6, [5–10]

== ITF Circuit finals ==
=== Singles: 31 (12 titles, 19 runner-ups) ===
Legend $50/60,000 tournaments (2–5) $40/50,000 tournaments $25,000 tournaments (5–9) $10/15,000 tournaments (5–5)	Finals by surface Hard (7–14) Clay (3–4) Grass (2–0) Carpet (0–1)

Result	W–L	Date	Tournament	Tier	Surface	Opponent	Score
Loss	0–1	Apr 2012	ITF Andijan, Uzbekistan	10,000	Hard	(Uzbekistan) Sabina Sharipova	2–6, 4–6
Loss	0–2	Jul 2012	ITF Pattaya, Thailand	10,000	Hard	(Thailand) Nungnadda Wannasuk	4–6, 6–4, 4–6
Win	1–2	Feb 2014	ITF Salisbury, Australia	15,000	Hard	(China) Wang Yafan	6–3, 7–6^{(6)}
Win	2–2	Mar 2014	ITF Mildura, Australia	15,000	Grass	(Australia) Alison Bai	6–1, 6–3
Win	3–2	May 2014	ITF Karuizawa, Japan	25,000	Grass	(Australia) Arina Rodionova	6–3, 6–4
Win	4–2	Feb 2015	ITF Clare, Australia	15,000	Hard	(Austria) Pia König	6–3, 6–3
Loss	4–3	Mar 2015	ITF Port Pirie, Australia	15,000	Hard	(South Korea) Han Na-lae	6–3, 4–6, 2–6
Win	5–3	Mar 2015	ITF Bangkok, Thailand	15,000	Hard	(Japan) Miyabi Inoue	6–2, 6–4
Loss	5–4	May 2015	ITF Nanning, China	25,000	Hard	(Chinese Taipei) Hsieh Su-wei	2–6, 3–6
Loss	5–5	May 2015	Seoul Open, South Korea	50,000	Hard	(Japan) Riko Sawayanagi	4–6, 4–6
Loss	5–6	Aug 2015	ITF Tsukuba, Japan	25,000	Hard	(Chinese Taipei) Lee Ya-hsuan	3–6, 3–6
Loss	5–7	Feb 2016	ITF Perth, Australia	25,000	Hard	(Australia) Jaimee Fourlis	4–6, 6–2, 6–7^{(1)}
Win	6–7	Apr 2016	ITF Kashiwa, Japan	25,000	Hard	(China) Wang Yafan	6–4, 1–6, 6–3
Loss	6–8	Jun 2016	ITF Tokyo, Japan	25,000	Hard	(Japan) Akiko Omae	2–6, 1–6
Loss	6–9	Oct 2016	ITF Iizuka Japan	25,000	Hard	(Chinese Taipei) Chang Kai-chen	3–6, 4–6
Loss	6–10	Oct 2016	Liuzhou Open, China	50,000	Hard	(Serbia) Nina Stojanović	3–6, 4–6
Loss	6–11	Apr 2017	ITF Kashiwa, Japan	25,000	Hard	(Japan) Mai Minokoshi	6–3, 2–6, 4–6
Loss	6–12	May 2017	Fukuoka International, Japan	60,000	Carpet	(Slovakia) Magdaléna Rybáriková	2–6, 3–6
Win	7–12	Jul 2019	ITF Nonthaburi, Thailand	25,000	Hard	(China) Xun Fangying	6–1, 2–6, 6–4
Loss	7–13	Aug 2019	ITF Guiyang, China	25,000	Hard	(Bulgaria) Aleksandrina Naydenova	4–6, 2–6
Loss	7–14	Mar 2021	ITF Antalya, Turkey	W15	Clay	(Italy) Nuria Brancaccio	5–7, 4–6
Win	8–14	Mar 2021	ITF Antalya, Turkey	W15	Clay	(Japan) Mai Hontama	4–6, 6–3, 6–2
Loss	8–15	Apr 2021	ITF Oeiras, Portugal	W25	Clay	(Ukraine) Anhelina Kalinina	4–6, 6–4, 4–6
Win	9–15	Aug 2021	ITF Oldenzaal, Netherlands	W25	Clay	(Norway) Malene Helgø	6–3, 6–2
Win	10–15	Apr 2022	Clay Court International, Australia	W60	Clay	(Japan) Yuki Naito	6–7^{(3)}, 6–1, 6–4
Loss	10–16	Oct 2022	Toronto Challenger, Canada	W60	Clay	(United States) Robin Anderson	2–6, 4–6
Win	11–16	Mar 2023	Nur-Sultan Challenger, Kazakhstan	W60	Hard (i)	(Japan) Moyuka Uchijima	6–1, 6–4
Win	12–16	Apr 2023	Kōfu International Open, Japan	W25	Hard	(South Korea) Han Na-lae	2–6, 6–3, 6–2
Loss	12–17	Apr 2023	ITF Kashiwa, Japan	W25	Hard	(Japan) Nao Hibino	4–6, 3–6
Loss	12–18	Jun 2024	ITS Cup Olomouc, Czech Republic	W75	Clay	(Hungary) Anna Bondár	3–6, 6–7^{(4)}
Loss	12–19	Aug 2026	ITF Astana, Kazakhstan	W15	Hard	(Kazakhstan) Asylzhan Arystanbekova	3–6, 1–6

=== Doubles: 30 (18 titles, 12 runner-ups) ===
Legend $100,000 tournaments (2–1) $80,000 tournaments (1–0) $60/75,000 tournaments (3–2) $40,000 tournaments (0–1) $25/35,000 tournaments (8–3) $10/15,000 tournaments (4–5)	Finals by surface Hard (12–9) Clay (4–3) Grass (2–0)

Result	W–L	Date	Tournament	Tier	Surface	Partner	Opponents	Score
Loss	0–1	Sep 2012	ITF Yeongwol, South Korea	10,000	Hard	(South Korea) Han Na-lae	(South Korea) Kim Sun-jung (South Korea) Yu Min-hwa	3–6, 5–7
Win	1–1	Mar 2013	ITF Bundaberg, Australia	25,000	Clay	(South Korea) Lee So-ra	(Japan) Miki Miyamura (Thailand) Varatchaya Wongteanchai	7–6^{(4)}, 4–6, [10–8]
Loss	1–2	Jun 2013	ITF Gimcheon, South Korea	10,000	Hard	(Japan) Riko Sawayanagi	(South Korea) Kim Na-ri (South Korea) Lee Ye-ra	3–6, 3–6
Loss	1–3	Jun 2013	ITF Gimcheon, South Korea	10,000	Hard	(Japan) Riko Sawayanagi	(South Korea) Kang Seo-kyung (South Korea) Kim Ji-young	5–7, 1–6
Loss	1–4	Feb 2014	ITF Salisbury, Australia	15,000	Hard	(South Korea) Lee So-ra	(Japan) Misa Eguchi (Japan) Miki Miyamura	2–6, 1–6
Win	2–4	Mar 2014	ITF Mildura, Australia	15,000	Grass	(South Korea) Lee So-ra	(Australia) Jessica Moore (Bulgaria) Aleksandrina Naydenova	6–1, 1–6, [10–4]
Loss	2–5	Jun 2014	ITF Lenzerheide, Switzerland	25,000	Clay	(Poland) Justyna Jegiołka	(United States) Louisa Chirico (United States) Sanaz Marand	3–6, 4–6
Win	3–5	Mar 2015	ITF Bangkok, Thailand	15,000	Hard	(Serbia) Vojislava Lukić	(South Africa) Chanel Simmonds (United Kingdom) Emily Webley-Smith	6–4, 6–4
Loss	3–6	Apr 2015	ITF Shenzhen, China	25,000	Hard	(South Korea) Han Na-lae	(Thailand) Noppawan Lertcheewakarn (China) Lu Jiajing	4–6, 5–7
Win	4–6	Jul 2015	ITF Zhengzhou, China	25,000	Hard	(South Korea) Han Na-lae	(China) Liu Chang (Hong Kong) Zhang Ling	6–3, 6–0
Win	5–6	Sep 2015	ITF Noto, Japan	25,000	Hard	(South Korea) Lee So-ra	(Japan) Chiaki Okadaue (Japan) Kyōka Okamura	6–3, 2–6, [10–8]
Loss	5–7	Feb 2016	ITF Perth, Australia	25,000	Hard	(South Korea) Han Na-lae	(Australia) Tammi Patterson (Poland) Katarzyna Piter	6–4, 2–6, [3–10]
Win	6–7	Apr 2017	ITF Kashiwa, Japan	25,000	Hard	(Chinese Taipei) Lee Ya-hsuan	(South Korea) Han Na-lae (Thailand) Peangtarn Plipuech	6–3, 3–6, [10–4]
Win	7–7	Aug 2019	ITF Huangshan, China	25,000	Hard	(South Korea) Kim Na-ri	(Hong Kong) Eudice Chong (China) Ye Qiuyu	7–5, 6–1
Loss	7–8	Mar 2021	ITF Antalya, Turkey	W15	Clay	(South Korea) Park So-hyun	(United States) Jessie Aney (Brazil) Ingrid Martins	2–6, 2–6
Win	8–8	Mar 2021	ITF Antalya, Turkey	W15	Clay	(Germany) Sina Herrmann	(Czech Republic) Anastasia Dețiuc (Czech Republic) Darja Viďmanová	w/o
Win	9–8	Apr 2021	ITF Antalya, Turkey	W15	Clay	(South Korea) Lee So-ra	(Colombia) María Paulina Pérez (Mexico) María Portillo Ramírez	6–2, 2–6, [10–7]
Win	10–8	Jul 2021	ITF Kyiv, Ukraine	W25	Hard	(Serbia) Bojana Marinković	(United Kingdom) Ali Collins (Venezuela) Andrea Gámiz	3–6, 6–4, [10–7]
Loss	10–9	Aug 2021	Kozerki Open, Poland	W60	Clay	(Chinese Taipei) Lee Ya-hsuan	(Chile) Bárbara Gatica (Brazil) Rebeca Pereira	3–6, 1–6
Win	11–9	Mar 2022	Clay Court International, Australia	W60	Clay	(South Korea) Han Na-lae	(Japan) Yuki Naito (Japan) Moyuka Uchijima	3–6, 6–2, [10–5]
Win	12–9	Jun 2022	Ilkley Trophy, UK	W100	Grass	(Australia) Lizette Cabrera	(United Kingdom) Naiktha Bains (United Kingdom) Maia Lumsden	6–7^{(7)}, 6–0, [11–9]
Loss	12–10	Aug 2022	Landisville Challenge, US	W100	Hard	(South Korea) Han Na-lae	(United States) Sophie Chang (Kazakhstan) Anna Danilina	6–2, 6–7^{(4)}, [9–11]
Win	13–10	Oct 2022	Toronto Challenger, Canada	W60	Hard (i)	(Czech Republic) Michaela Bayerlová	(Australia) Elysia Bolton (United States) Jamie Loeb	6–3, 6–2
Loss	13–11	Mar 2023	Nur-Sultan Challenger, Kazakhstan	W40	Hard (i)	(South Korea) Han Na-lae	(Kazakhstan) Anna Danilina (Belarus) Iryna Shymanovich	4–6, 7–6^{(8)}, [7–10]
Loss	13–12	Mar 2023	Nur-Sultan Challenger 2	W60	Hard (i)	(South Korea) Han Na-lae	(Russia) Polina Kudermetova (Russia) Anastasia Tikhonova	6–2, 3–6, [7–10]
Win	14–12	Apr 2023	Kōfu International Open, Japan	W25	Hard	(South Korea) Han Na-lae	(Spain) Georgina García Pérez (Japan) Eri Hozumi	6–0, 6–4
Win	15–12	May 2023	Kangaroo Cup, Japan	W80	Hard	(South Korea) Han Na-lae	(Chinese Taipei) Lee Ya-hsuan (Chinese Taipei) Wu Fang-hsien	7–6^{(3)}, 2–6, [10–8]
Win	16–12	Apr 2024	Tokyo Open, Japan	W100	Hard	(Australia) Kimberly Birrell	(Serbia) Aleksandra Krunić (Australia) Arina Rodionova	7–5, 3–6, [10–8]
Win	17–12	Jan 2025	ITF Nonthaburi, Thailand	W75	Hard	(China) Zheng Wushuang	(India) Rutuja Bhosale (Hong Kong) Eudice Chong	4–6, 6–0, [10–6]
Win	18–12	May 2026	ITF Andong, South Korea	W35	Hard	(South Korea) Back Da-yeon	(South Korea) Jeong Bo-young (South Korea) Park So-hyun	6–4, 6–3
