= 2017 Tevlin Women's Challenger – Doubles =

Doubles
- 2017 Tevlin Women's Challenger

Final
- Champions: (Chile) Alexa Guarachi (New Zealand) Erin Routliffe
- Runners-up: (Belgium) Ysaline Bonaventure (Mexico) Victoria Rodríguez
- Score: 7–6^{(7–4)}, 3–6, [10–4]

Events
Singles	Doubles
- Tevlin Women's Challenger

Gabriela Dabrowski and Michaëlla Krajicek were the defending champions, but decided not to participate this year.

Alexa Guarachi and Erin Routliffe won the title, defeating Ysaline Bonaventure and Victoria Rodríguez 7–6^{(7–4)}, 3–6, [10–4] in the final.

== Seeds ==
1. (United States) Maria Sanchez / (Russia) Valeria Savinykh (semifinals)
2. (Belgium) An-Sophie Mestach / (United Kingdom) Tara Moore (quarterfinals)
3. (Slovakia) Michaela Hončová / (Netherlands) Bibiane Schoofs (first round, withdrew)
4. (Canada) Bianca Andreescu / (Canada) Carol Zhao (first round)

== Draw ==
Key

- Q = Qualifier
- WC = Wild card
- LL = Lucky loser
- Alt = Alternate
- ITF = ITF entry
- PR = Protected ranking
- SR = Special ranking
- SE = Special exempt
- JE = Junior exempt
- JR = Junior Accelerator Programme entrant
- CO = College Accelerator Programme entrant
- NG = Next Gen Accelerator Program entrant
- w/o = Walkover
- r = Retired
- d = Defaulted

First round
1	(United States) M Sanchez (Russia) V Savinykh	7^{7}	6
(United States) C Van Nguyen (United States) R Yurovsky	6^{3}	1
(United States) F Di Lorenzo (United States) K Shaffer	2	6^{3}
(Chinese Taipei) C-y Hsu (United States) J Wacnik	6	7^{7}
4	(Canada) B Andreescu (Canada) C Zhao	2	4
(Chile) A Guarachi (New Zealand) E Routliffe	6	6
(Spain) A Bolsova Zadoinov (China) S Xu
(Russia) N Kukharchuk (Switzerland) L Küng	w/o
(Belgium) Y Bonaventure (Mexico) V Rodríguez	7	7
(Canada) P Januskova (United States) M Kobelt	5	5
(Canada) A Craciun (Trinidad and Tobago) Y Leacock	w/o
3	(Slovakia) M Hončová (Netherlands) B Schoofs
(France) J Ponchet (Belgium) K Zimmermann	6	6
(United States) K Daniel (Canada) C Leduc	4	3
(Serbia) J Jakšić (United States) R McAdoo	2^{r}
2	(Belgium) A-S Mestach (United Kingdom) T Moore	1

Quarterfinals
1	(United States) M Sanchez (Russia) V Savinykh	6	2	[10]
(Chinese Taipei) C-y Hsu (United States) J Wacnik	2	6	[8]
(Chile) A Guarachi (New Zealand) E Routliffe	7	6
(Russia) N Kukharchuk (Switzerland) L Küng	5	2
(Belgium) Y Bonaventure (Mexico) V Rodríguez	6	6
(Canada) A Craciun (Trinidad and Tobago) Y Leacock	2	1
(France) J Ponchet (Belgium) K Zimmermann	0	6	[10]
2	(Belgium) A-S Mestach (United Kingdom) T Moore	6	3	[7]

Semifinals
1	(United States) M Sanchez (Russia) V Savinykh	6	3	[6]
(Chile) A Guarachi (New Zealand) E Routliffe	2	6	[10]
(Belgium) Y Bonaventure (Mexico) V Rodríguez	2	6	[10]
(France) J Ponchet (Belgium) K Zimmermann	6	3	[1]

Final
(Chile) A Guarachi (New Zealand) E Routliffe	7^{7}	3	[10]
(Belgium) Y Bonaventure (Mexico) V Rodríguez	6^{4}	6	[4]
