= Elysia Bolton =

American tennis player

- Country (sports): Australia (present); United States
- Born: 24 March 2000 (age 26) Sydney, Australia
- Plays: Right-handed
- College: UCLA
- Prize money: $74,338

Singles
- Career record: 100–94
- Career titles: 1 ITF
- Highest ranking: No. 517 (2 August 2021)

Doubles
- Career record: 101–59
- Career titles: 10 ITF
- Highest ranking: No. 167 (17 July 2023)
- Current ranking: No. 681 (13 October 2025)
- Last updated on: 2 June 2026.

Elysia Bolton (born 24 March 2000) is an Australian tennis player.

Bolton has a career-high singles ranking by the WTA of 517, reached on 2 August 2021. She also has a career-high WTA doubles ranking of 167, achieved on 17 July 2023.

In May 2024, Bolton played her last singles match on the circuit. Since then, she has specialized in doubles; her biggest title up to date she won at the 2023 Clay Court International in Canberra, partnering Alexandra Bozovic.

Bolton played college tennis at UCLA.

== ITF Circuit finals ==
=== Singles: 1 (title) ===
Legend
W15 tournaments

| Result | Date | Tournament | Tier | Surface | Opponent | Score |
|---|---|---|---|---|---|---|
| Win | Jul 2018 | ITF Evansville, United States | W15 | Hard | (United States) Connie Ma | 6–3, 4–6, 6–3 |

=== Doubles: 17 (10 titles, 7 runner-ups) ===
Legend
W60 tournaments
W40/50 tournaments
W25/35 tournaments

| Result | W–L | Date | Tournament | Tier | Surface | Partner | Opponents | Score |
|---|---|---|---|---|---|---|---|---|
| Loss | 0–1 | Aug 2019 | ITF Fort Worth, US | W25 | Hard | (United States) Jada Hart | (Romania) Gabriela Lee (Chinese Taipei) Hsu Chieh-yu | 6–7^{(8)}, 5–7 |
| Loss | 0–2 | Oct 2021 | ITF Florence, US | W25 | Hard | (United States) Robin Anderson | (United Kingdom) Emily Appleton (Japan) Lily Miyazaki | 3–6, 6–1, [8–10] |
| Win | 1–2 | Oct 2021 | ITF Austin, US | W25 | Hard | (United States) Maegan Manasse | (United States) Rasheeda McAdoo (United States) Chanelle Van Nguyen | 6–1, 7–5 |
| Win | 2–2 | Nov 2021 | ITF Daytona Beach, US | W25 | Clay | (United States) Kylie Collins | (Australia) Alexandra Osborne (United States) Alycia Parks | 6–4, 6–7^{(4)}, [10–5] |
| Loss | 2–3 | Sep 2022 | Caldas da Rainha Open, Portugal | W60+H | Hard | (United States) Jamie Loeb | (United States) Adriana Reami (United States) Anna Rogers | 4–6, 5–7 |
| Win | 3–3 | Oct 2022 | ITF Austin, US | W25 | Hard | (United States) Jamie Loeb | (Poland) Martyna Kubka (United States) Ashley Lahey | 6–3, 6–3 |
| Loss | 3–4 | Oct 2022 | Toronto Challenger, Canada | W60 | Hard (i) | (United States) Jamie Loeb | (Czech Republic) Michaela Bayerlová (South Korea) Jang Su-jeong | 3–6, 2–6 |
| Win | 4–4 | Mar 2023 | ITF Swan Hill, Australia | W25 | Grass | (Australia) Alexandra Bozovic | (Australia) Olivia Gadecki (Australia) Petra Hule | 7–6^{(3)}, 2–6, [10–7] |
| Win | 5–4 | Mar 2023 | Clay Court International, Australia | W60 | Clay | (Australia) Alexandra Bozovic | (Australia) Priscilla Hon (Slovenia) Dalila Jakupović | 4–6, 7–5, [13–11] |
| Loss | 5–5 | May 2023 | ITF Pelham, US | W60 | Clay | (United States) Robin Anderson | (United States) Makenna Jones (United States) Jamie Loeb | 4–6, 5–7 |
| Win | 6–5 | Jun 2023 | ITF Setúbal, US | W25 | Hard | (Australia) Alexandra Bozovic | (Australia) Gabriella Da Silva-Fick (Australia) Petra Hule | 6–7^{(6)}, 7–6^{(3)}, [10–8] |
| Loss | 6–6 | Jun 2023 | ITF Palma del Río, Spain | W40 | Hard | (United States) Robin Anderson | (Venezuela) Andrea Gámiz (United States) Sofia Sewing | 3–6, 2–6 |
| Loss | 6–7 | Sep 2023 | ITF Berkeley, US | W60 | Hard | (Australia) Alexandra Bozovic | (United States) Jessie Aney (Colombia) María Herazo González | 5–7, 5–7 |
| Win | 7–7 | Apr 2024 | ITF Boca Raton, United States | W35 | Clay | (United States) Robin Anderson | (United States) Rasheeda McAdoo (United States) Maribella Zamarripa | 3–6, 6–4, [10–8] |
| Win | 8–7 | May 2024 | ITF Lopota, Georgia | W50 | Hard | (United States) Catherine Harrison | (Russia) Anastasia Zolotareva (Russia) Rada Zolotareva | 6–4, 6–2 |
| Win | 9–7 | Sep 2024 | ITF Berkeley, US | W35 | Hard | (United States) Maegan Manasse | (India) Rutuja Bhosale (United States) Ema Burgić | 6–7^{(3)}, 6–2, [10–6] |
| Win | 10–7 | Oct 2025 | ITF Redding, US | W35 | Hard | (United States) Jaeda Daniel | (United States) Kolie Allen (United States) Rasheeda McAdoo | 7–5, 7–5 |
