= Michaela Bayerlová =

Czech tennis player (born 1998)

- Country (sports): Czech Republic
- Born: 14 December 1998 (age 27)
- Plays: Right-handed
- College: Washington State
- Prize money: US$ 149,541

Singles
- Career record: 218–190
- Career titles: 5 ITF
- Highest ranking: No. 317 (26 June 2023)
- Current ranking: No. 798 (21 September 2026)

Doubles
- Career record: 186–163
- Career titles: 16 ITF
- Highest ranking: No. 198 (3 August 2026)
- Current ranking: No. 225 (21 September 2026)
- Last updated on: 26 September 2026.

Michaela Bayerlová (born 14 December 1998) is a Czech tennis player.

Bayerlová has a career-high singles ranking by the WTA of No. 317, reached in June 2023 and a best doubles ranking of No. 199, achieved on 27 July 2026.

She won her first bigger ITF title at the 2022 Tevlin Women's Challenger in Toronto, in the doubles draw, partnering Jang Su-jeong.

Bayerlová played college tennis at the Washington State University.

== Performance timeline ==
Key
W	F	SF	QF	#R	RR	Q#	P#	DNQ	A	Z#	PO	G	S	B	NMS	NTI	P	NH

(W) winner; (F) finalist; (SF) semifinalist; (QF) quarterfinalist; (#R) rounds 4, 3, 2, 1; (RR) round-robin stage; (Q#) qualification round; (P#) preliminary round; (DNQ) did not qualify; (A) absent; (Z#) Davis/Fed Cup Zonal Group (with number indication) or (PO) play-off; (G) gold, (S) silver or (B) bronze Olympic/Paralympic medal; (NMS) not a Masters tournament; (NTI) not a Tier I tournament; (P) postponed; (NH) not held; (SR) strike rate (events won / competed); (W–L) win–loss record.
To avoid confusion and double counting, these charts are updated at the conclusion of a tournament or when the player's participation has ended.

Only main-draw results in WTA Tour, Grand Slam tournaments, Billie Jean King Cup, United Cup, Hopman Cup and Olympic Games are included in win–loss records.

=== Doubles ===
Current after the 2026 SP Open.

Tournament	2023	2024	2025	2026	SR	W–L	Win%
Grand Slam tournaments
Australian Open	A	A	A	A	0 / 0	0–0	–
French Open	A	A	A	A	0 / 0	0–0	–
Wimbledon	A	A	A	A	0 / 0	0–0	–
US Open	A	A	A	A	0 / 0	0–0	–
Win–loss	0–0	0–0	0–0	0–0	0 / 0	0–0	–
Career statistics
Tournaments	1	0	1	1	Career total: 3		
Overall win–loss	0–1	0–0	0–1	0–1	0 / 3	0–3	0%

== ITF Circuit finals ==
=== Singles: 11 (5 titles, 6 runner-ups) ===
Legend
W25 tournaments (0–2)
15K / W15 tournaments (5–4)

Result	W–L	Date	Tournament	Tier	Surface	Opponent	Score
Win	1–0	Jun 2017	ITF Alkmaar, Netherlands	15K	Clay	(Germany) Laura Heinrichs	6–4, 6–2
Win	2–0	Oct 2017	ITF Charleston, United States	15K	Clay	(Paraguay) Montserrat González	2–6, 6–3, 6–3
Win	3–0	Jun 2018	ITF Banja Luka, Bosnia and Herzegovina	15K	Clay	(Japan) Satsuki Takamura	6–2, 6–1
Loss	3–1	Jul 2018	ITF Dijon, France	15K	Hard	(United States) Katharine Fahey	6–7^{(3–7)}, 4–6
Loss	3–2	Sep 2018	ITF Hilton Head, United States	15K	Clay	(Italy) Bianca Turati	6–7^{(0–7)}, 2–6
Win	4–2	Jul 2019	ITF Sandefjord, Norway	W15	Clay	(Norway) Malene Helgø	5–7, 6–3, 6–3
Loss	4–3	Jun 2021	ITF Heraklion, Greece	W15	Clay	(Russia) Darya Astakhova	3–6, 2–6
Win	5–3	Aug 2021	ITF Frederiksberg, Denmark	W15	Clay	(Israel) Nicole Khirin	6–1, 6–1
Loss	5–4	Jun 2022	ITF Klosters, Switzerland	W25	Clay	(Czech Republic) Brenda Fruhvirtová	5–7, 5–7
Loss	5–5	Dec 2022	ITF Tauranga, New Zealand	W25	Hard	(Canada) Katherine Sebov	0–6, 4–6
Loss	5–6	Aug 2026	ITF Cap d'Agde, France	W15	Clay	(South Africa) Jahnie van Zyl	5–7, 0–6

=== Doubles: 28 (16 titles, 12 runner-ups) ===
Legend
W60/75 tournaments (3–5)
W50 tournaments (1–0)
W25/35 tournaments (3–5)
15K / W15 tournaments (9–2)

Result	W–L	Date	Tournament	Tier	Surface	Partner	Opponents	Score
Win	1–0	Jun 2018	ITF Maribor, Slovenia	15K	Clay	(Kosovo) Adrijana Lekaj	(France) Irina Ramialison (France) Constance Sibille	7–6^{(7–2)}, 7–5
Win	2–0	Jul 2018	ITF Jablonec nad Nisou, Czech Republic	15K	Clay	(Germany) Eva Marie Voracek	(Czech Republic) Radka Bužková (Czech Republic) Aneta Laboutková	7–5, 4–6, [13–11]
Win	3–0	Nov 2020	ITF Sharm El Sheikh, Egypt	W15	Hard	(Czech Republic) Laetitia Pulchartová	(Russia) Elina Avanesyan (Belarus) Iryna Shymanovich	6–4, 7–5
Win	4–0	Jun 2021	ITF Heraklion, Greece	W15	Clay	(United States) Jessie Aney	(Israel) Nicole Khirin (Israel) Shavit Kimchi	6–4, 6–4
Loss	4–1	Jun 2021	ITF L'Aquila, Italy	W15	Clay	(Germany) Emily Seibold	(Serbia) Tamara Čurović (Germany) Natalia Siedliska	2–6, 3–6
Win	5–1	Jun 2022	ITF Pörtschach, Austria	W25	Clay	(Slovenia) Tina Cvetkovič	(Sweden) Caijsa Hennemann (Poland) Martyna Kubka	6–3, 6–3
Loss	5–2	Jul 2022	Amstelveen Open, Netherlands	W60	Clay	(Czech Republic) Aneta Laboutková	(Spain) Aliona Bolsova (Spain) Guiomar Maristany	2–6, 2–6
Loss	5–3	Aug 2022	Verbier Open, Switzerland	W25	Clay	(Italy) Nicole Fossa Huergo	(Japan) Erina Hayashi (Japan) Kanako Morisaki	2–6, 1–6
Loss	5–4	Sep 2022	Collonge-Bellerive Open, Switzerland	W60	Clay	(Sweden) Jacqueline Cabaj Awad	(Switzerland) Jenny Dürst (Poland) Weronika Falkowska	6–7^{(5–7)}, 1–6
Win	6–4	Oct 2022	Toronto Challenger, Canada	W60	Hard (i)	(South Korea) Jang Su-jeong	(Australia) Elysia Bolton (United States) Jamie Loeb	6–3, 6–2
Loss	6–5	Jun 2023	ITF Annenheim, Austria	W25	Clay	(Switzerland) Jenny Dürst	(Hungary) Amarissa Tóth; Anna Zyryanova	4–6, 6–2, [8–10]
Win	7–5	Jul 2023	ITF Darmstadt, Germany	W25	Clay	(Australia) Alana Parnaby	(Romania) Arina Gabriela Vasilescu; Anastasia Zolotareva	7–5, 6–4
Loss	7–6	Dec 2023	ITF Papamoa, New Zealand	W25	Hard	(Australia) Alana Parnaby	(Japan) Mio Mushika (Japan) Hikaru Sato	4–6, 7–5, [8–10]
Win	8–6	Apr 2024	ITF Telde, Spain	W15	Clay	(Netherlands) Stéphanie Visscher	(Belgium) Tilwith Di Girolami (Netherlands) Sarah van Emst	6–4, 6–2
Loss	8–7	May 2024	ITF Kuršumlijska Banja, Serbia	W35	Clay	(Bulgaria) Lia Karatancheva	Ksenia Laskutova (Slovakia) Radka Zelníčková	7–5, 6–7^{(7–3)}, [9–11]
Loss	8–8	Jul 2024	ITF Kuršumlijska Banja	W15	Clay	(Australia) Jelena Cvijanovic	(Australia) Valentina Ivanov (Sweden) Lisa Zaar	4–6, 7–6^{(7–1)}, [8–10]
Win	9–8	Aug 2024	Ladies Open Hechingen, Germany	W75	Clay	(Georgia (country)) Sofia Shapatava	(Germany) Anna Gabric (Germany) Mia Mack	6–2, 5–7, [10–6]
Win	10–8	Sep 2024	ITF Kuršumlijska Banja, Serbia	W15	Clay	(Romania) Ștefania Bojică	(Poland) Zuzanna Pawlikowska (Switzerland) Katerina Tsygourova	6–2, 6–2
Loss	10–9	Jan 2025	ITF Buenos Aires, Argentina	W35	Clay	(Romania) Briana Szabó	(Mexico) Victoria Rodríguez (Mexico) Ana Sofía Sánchez	7–5, 2–6, [8–10]
Win	11–9	Mar 2025	Vacaria Open, Brazil	W50	Clay (i)	(Italy) Miriana Tona	(United States) Robin Anderson (Spain) Alicia Herrero Liñana	6–7^{(4–7)}, 7–6^{(7–5)}, [10–7]
Win	12–9	Apr 2025	ITF Kuršumlijska Banja, Serbia	W15	Clay	(Romania) Ștefania Bojică	(Germany) Chantal Sauvant (Serbia) Anja Stanković	6–2, 6–3
Win	13–9	Jun 2025	ITF Kuršumlijska Banja	W15	Clay	(Czech Republic) Denisa Hindová	(Serbia) Draginja Vuković; Milana Zhabrailova	2–6, 7–6^{(7–3)}, [10–7]
Loss	13–10	Sep 2025	ITF Kuršumlijska Banja	W75	Clay	(Greece) Martha Matoula	(Poland) Weronika Falkowska (Czech Republic) Anna Sisková	0–6, 5–7
Loss	13–11	Apr 2026	ITF Calvi, France	W75	Hard	(Australia) Tenika McGiffin	(Czech Republic) Aneta Kučmová (Czech Republic) Aneta Laboutková	4–6, 6–3, [3–10]
Win	14–11	May 2026	ITF Kuršumlijska Banja	W15	Clay	(Czech Republic) Laetitia Pulchartová	(France) Nina Radovanović (Serbia) Anja Stanković	7–6^{(7–0)}, 7–6^{(7–4)}
Win	15–11	May 2026	ITF Kuršumlijska Banja	W75	Clay	(Serbia) Elena Milovanović	(Kazakhstan) Zhibek Kulambayeva (Sweden) Lisa Zaar	6–3, 6–4
Win	16–11	Jun 2026	ITF Klosters, Switzerland	W35	Clay	(Germany) Eva Marie Voracek	(Netherlands) Merel Hoedt (Hungary) Adrienn Nagy	4–6, 7–6^{(7–1)}, [10–5]
Loss	16–12	Oct 2026	Challenger de Saguenay, Canada	W75	Hard (i)	(Netherlands) Jasmijn Gimbrère	(United States) Reese Brantmeier (United States) Carson Tanguilig	2–6, 6–7^{(3)}

== Junior finals ==
=== ITF Junior Circuit ===
==== Singles: 4 (4 runner-ups) ====
Legend
Grade 3 (0–1)
Grade 4 (0–3)

Result	W–L	Date	Tournament	Tier	Surface	Opponent	Score
Loss	0–1	Sep 2014	ITF Veli Lošinj, Croatia	Grade 4	Clay	(Slovenia) Nika Kozar	2–6, 5–7
Loss	0–2	Jul 2015	ITF Mönchengladbach, Germany	Grade 4	Clay	(Germany) Anastazja Rosnowska	2–6, 3–6
Loss	0–3	Aug 2015	ITF Schifflange, Luxembourg	Grade 4	Clay	(Germany) Katharina Hobgarski	4–6, 6–2, 5–7
Loss	0–4	Jul 2016	ITF Lviv, Ukraine	Grade 3	Clay	(Ukraine) Oleksandra Andrieieva	3–6, 4–6

==== Doubles: 7 (6 titles, 1 runner-up) ====
Legend
Grade 2 (1–0)
Grade 3 (1–0)
Grade 4 (3–1)
Grade 5 (1–0)

Result	W–L	Date	Tournament	Tier	Surface	Partner	Opponents	Score
Win	1–0	Sep 2014	ITF Mostar, Bosnia and Herzegovina	Grade 5	Clay	(Austria) Caroline Ilowska	(Hungary) Csenge Furak (Serbia) Kristina Miletic	6–3, 6–4
Loss	1–1	Sep 2014	ITF Veli Lošinj, Croatia	Grade 4	Clay	(Austria) Caroline Ilowska	(Slovenia) Zala Dovnik (Slovenia) Nika Kozar	5–7, 3–6
Win	2–1	Apr 2015	ITF Florence, Italy	Grade 2	Clay	(Czech Republic) Barbora Miklova	(Austria) Mira Antonitsch (Ukraine) Anastasiya Fedoryshyn	4–6, 6–3, [10–6]
Win	3–1	Jul 2015	ITF Mönchengladbach, Germany	Grade 4	Clay	(Uzbekistan) Komola Umarova	(Germany) Shaline-Doreen Pipa (Germany) Anastazja Rosnowska	0–6, 6–4, [10–5]
Win	4–1	Aug 2015	ITF Schifflange, Luxembourg	Grade 4	Clay	(Germany) Eva Marie Voracek	(France) Carla Hassaine (France) Juliette Loliee	6–4, 5–7, [10–6]
Win	5–1	Feb 2016	ITF Cadolzburg, Germany	Grade 4	Carpet	(Switzerland) Tamara Arnold	(Germany) Shaline-Doreen Pipa (Germany) Anastazja Rosnowska	6–4, 3–6, [10–4]
Win	6–1	Jul 2016	ITF Lviv, Ukraine	Grade 3	Clay	(Ukraine) Margaryta Bilokin	(Ukraine) Maryna Chernyshova (Ukraine) Kateryna Popova	2–1 ret.
