= Tevlin Women's Challenger =

- 2025 Tevlin Women's Challenger

Women's World Tennis Tour
- Founded: 2005; 21 years ago
- Location: Toronto, Ontario, Canada
- Venue: Aviva Centre
- Category: ITF Women's Circuit
- Surface: Hard – indoors
- Draw: 32S (32Q) / 16D (0Q)
- Prize money: US$ 60,000
- Website: www.tenniscanada.com

The Tevlin Women's Challenger is a professional tennis tournament played on indoor hardcourts. The event is classified as a $60,000 ITF Circuit tournament and has been held in Toronto, Canada since 2005.

== Past finals ==
=== Singles ===
Year	Champion	Runner-up	Score
2026	(United States) Reese Brantmeier	(Canada) Katherine Sebov	6–3, 6–1
2025	(United Kingdom) Harriet Dart	(United States) Fiona Crawley	6–2, 6–2
2024	(United States) Louisa Chirico	(Canada) Kayla Cross	7–6^{(7–5)}, 6–3
2023	(Canada) Marina Stakusic	(Croatia) Jana Fett	3–6, 7–5, 6–3
2022	(United States) Robin Anderson	(South Korea) Jang Su-jeong	6–2, 6–4
2020–21	Cancelled due to the COVID-19 pandemic		
2019	(United States) Francesca Di Lorenzo	(Belgium) Kirsten Flipkens	7–6^{(7–3)}, 6–4
2018	(Netherlands) Quirine Lemoine	(Ukraine) Kateryna Kozlova	6–2, 6–3
2017	(Belgium) Ysaline Bonaventure	(Switzerland) Patty Schnyder	7–6^{(7–3)}, 6–3
2016	(United States) Catherine Bellis	(Czech Republic) Jesika Malečková	6–2, 1–6, 6–3
2015	(Germany) Tatjana Maria	(Serbia) Jovana Jakšić	6–3, 6–2
2014	(Canada) Gabriela Dabrowski	(United States) Maria Sanchez	6–4, 2–6, 7–6^{(9–7)}
2013	(United States) Victoria Duval	(Hungary) Tímea Babos	7–5, retired
2012	(Canada) Eugenie Bouchard	(Canada) Sharon Fichman	6–1, 6–2
2011	(Switzerland) Amra Sadiković	(Canada) Gabriela Dabrowski	6–4, 6–2
2010	(United Kingdom) Heather Watson	(France) Alizé Lim	6–3, 6–3
2009	(Italy) Camila Giorgi	(Hungary) Anikó Kapros	4–6, 6–4, 6–0
2008	(United States) Alexa Glatch	(Canada) Stéphanie Dubois	6–4, 6–3
2007	(Germany) Sabine Lisicki	(Argentina) María José Argeri	6–4, 6–4
2006	(Romania) Ioana Raluca Olaru	(United States) Carly Gullickson	6–3, 6–1
2005	(Canada) Aleksandra Wozniak	(Ukraine) Olena Antypina	6–4, 6–3

=== Doubles ===
Year	Champions	Runners-up	Score
2026	(Canada) Ariana Arseneault (Canada) Raphaëlle Lacasse	(United States) Ayana Akli (United States) Madison Sieg	6–1, 7–6^{(7–3)}
2025	(Slovakia) Viktória Hrunčáková; Anastasia Tikhonova	(United States) Fiona Crawley (United States) Jaeda Daniel	6–4, 6–2
2024	(United States) Jamie Loeb (Lithuania) Justina Mikulskyte	(France) Julie Belgraver (Netherlands) Jasmijn Gimbrere	6–2, 6–1
2023	(United States) Carmen Corley (United States) Ivana Corley	(Canada) Kayla Cross (United States) Liv Hovde	6–7^{(6–8)}, 6–3, [10–3]
2022	(Czech Republic) Michaela Bayerlová (South Korea) Jang Su-jeong	(Australia) Elysia Bolton (United States) Jamie Loeb	6–3, 6–2
2020–21	Cancelled due to the COVID-19 pandemic		
2019	(United States) Robin Anderson (France) Jessika Ponchet	(Canada) Mélodie Collard (Canada) Leylah Fernandez	7–6^{(9–7)}, 6–2
2018	(Canada) Sharon Fichman (United States) Maria Sanchez	(Poland) Maja Chwalińska (Bulgaria) Elitsa Kostova	6–0, 6–4
2017	(Chile) Alexa Guarachi (New Zealand) Erin Routliffe	(Belgium) Ysaline Bonaventure (Mexico) Victoria Rodríguez	7–6^{(7–4)}, 3–6, [10–4]
2016	(Canada) Gabriela Dabrowski (Netherlands) Michaëlla Krajicek	(United States) Ashley Weinhold (United States) Caitlin Whoriskey	6–4, 6–3
2015	(Canada) Sharon Fichman (United States) Maria Sanchez	(United States) Kristie Ahn (Hungary) Fanny Stollár	6–2, 6–7^{(6–8)}, [10–6]
2014	(United States) Maria Sanchez (United States) Taylor Townsend	(Canada) Gabriela Dabrowski (Germany) Tatjana Maria	7–5, 4–6, [15–13]
2013	(Canada) Françoise Abanda (United States) Victoria Duval	(United States) Melanie Oudin (United States) Jessica Pegula	7–6^{(7–5)}, 2–6, [11–9]
2012	(Canada) Gabriela Dabrowski (Russia) Alla Kudryavtseva	(Canada) Eugenie Bouchard (United States) Jessica Pegula	6–2, 7–6^{(7–2)}
2011	(Canada) Gabriela Dabrowski (Canada) Marie-Ève Pelletier	(Hungary) Tímea Babos (United States) Jessica Pegula	7–5, 6–7^{(4–7)}, [10–4]
2010	(Canada) Gabriela Dabrowski (Canada) Sharon Fichman	(United States) Brittany Augustine (United States) Alexandra Mueller	6–4, 6–0
2009	(Canada) Maureen Drake (Canada) Marianne Jodoin	(Canada) Sharon Fichman (United States) Mashona Washington	2–3 retired
2008	(Canada) Stéphanie Dubois (Canada) Marie-Ève Pelletier	(Czech Republic) Nikola Fraňková (Germany) Carmen Klaschka	6–4, 6–3
2007	(Canada) Gabriela Dabrowski (Canada) Sharon Fichman	(Brazil) Maria Fernanda Alves (Australia) Christina Wheeler	6–3, 6–0
2006	(Germany) Angelika Bachmann (Czech Republic) Hana Šromová	(Canada) Heidi El Tabakh (Romania) Raluca Olaru	6–4, 6–1
2005	(Ukraine) Olena Antypina (Germany) Martina Müller	(United States) Lauren Barnikow (United States) Kristen Schlukebir	6–3, 6–1
