= 2018 ITF Women's Circuit (October–December) =

Tennis circuit

The 2018 ITF Women's Circuit is the 2018 edition of the second tier tour for women's professional tennis. It is organised by the International Tennis Federation and is a tier below the WTA Tour. The ITF Women's Circuit includes tournaments with prize money ranging from $15,000 up to $100,000.

== Key ==
Category
$100,000 tournaments
$80,000 tournaments
$60,000 tournaments
$25,000 tournaments
$15,000 tournaments

== Month ==
=== October ===
Week of	Tournament	Winner	Runners-up	Semifinalists	Quarterfinalists
October 1	Stockton Challenger; Stockton, United States; Hard $60,000; Singles – Doubles	(United States) Madison Brengle; 7–5, 7–6^{(12–10)}	(United States) Danielle Lao	(Russia) Sofya Zhuk (United States) Jessica Pegula	(United States) Ann Li (United States) Robin Anderson (United States) Whitney Osuigwe (Switzerland) Amra Sadiković
October 1	Stockton Challenger; Stockton, United States; Hard $60,000; Singles – Doubles	(United States) Hayley Carter (United States) Ena Shibahara; 7–5, 5–7, [10–7]	(United States) Quinn Gleason (Brazil) Luisa Stefani	(Russia) Sofya Zhuk (United States) Jessica Pegula	(United States) Ann Li (United States) Robin Anderson (United States) Whitney Osuigwe (Switzerland) Amra Sadiković
October 1	Brisbane, Australia; Hard $25,000; Singles and doubles draws	(China) Xu Shilin; 6–4, 6–3	(Australia) Ellen Perez	(Australia) Kimberly Birrell (Germany) Vivian Heisen	(Australia) Olivia Rogowska (United Kingdom) Katy Dunne (India) Rutuja Bhosale (Hungary) Dalma Gálfi
October 1	Brisbane, Australia; Hard $25,000; Singles and doubles draws	(Australia) Maddison Inglis (Australia) Kaylah McPhee; 7–5, 6–4	(India) Rutuja Bhosale (China) Xu Shilin	(Australia) Kimberly Birrell (Germany) Vivian Heisen	(Australia) Olivia Rogowska (United Kingdom) Katy Dunne (India) Rutuja Bhosale (Hungary) Dalma Gálfi
October 1	Pula, Italy; Clay $25,000; Singles and doubles draws	(Romania) Raluca Georgiana Șerban; 7–6^{(7–2)}, 6–4	(Italy) Anastasia Grymalska	(Italy) Jasmine Paolini (United Kingdom) Francesca Jones	(Brazil) Carolina Alves (Russia) Amina Anshba (Venezuela) Andrea Gámiz (Canada) Carson Branstine
October 1	Pula, Italy; Clay $25,000; Singles and doubles draws	(Russia) Amina Anshba (Georgia (country)) Sofia Shapatava; 7–6^{(7–5)}, 2–6, [10–6]	(Italy) Martina Di Giuseppe (Italy) Anna-Giulia Remondina	(Italy) Jasmine Paolini (United Kingdom) Francesca Jones	(Brazil) Carolina Alves (Russia) Amina Anshba (Venezuela) Andrea Gámiz (Canada) Carson Branstine
October 1	Lagos, Nigeria; Hard $25,000; Singles and doubles draws	(India) Pranjala Yadlapalli; 2–6, 7–5, 6–0	(Switzerland) Conny Perrin	(Slovakia) Tereza Mihalíková (Argentina) Victoria Bosio	(Slovenia) Nastja Kolar (Ukraine) Valeriya Strakhova (France) Estelle Cascino (Israel) Deniz Khazaniuk
October 1	Lagos, Nigeria; Hard $25,000; Singles and doubles draws	(Slovakia) Tereza Mihalíková (Bulgaria) Julia Terziyska; 6–7^{(4–7)}, 6–2, [10–7]	(France) Estelle Cascino (Israel) Deniz Khazaniuk	(Slovakia) Tereza Mihalíková (Argentina) Victoria Bosio	(Slovenia) Nastja Kolar (Ukraine) Valeriya Strakhova (France) Estelle Cascino (Israel) Deniz Khazaniuk
October 1	Óbidos, Portugal; Carpet $25,000; Singles and doubles draws	(Turkey) Pemra Özgen; 5–7, 6–4, 6–2	(Italy) Gaia Sanesi	(Sweden) Mirjam Björklund (Belgium) Greet Minnen	(Bulgaria) Aleksandrina Naydenova (Spain) Cristina Bucșa (United Kingdom) Sarah Beth Grey (Italy) Dalila Spiteri
October 1	Óbidos, Portugal; Carpet $25,000; Singles and doubles draws	(Serbia) Natalija Kostić (Japan) Akiko Omae; 6–3, 4–6, [10–7]	(Latvia) Diāna Marcinkēviča (Hungary) Panna Udvardy	(Sweden) Mirjam Björklund (Belgium) Greet Minnen	(Bulgaria) Aleksandrina Naydenova (Spain) Cristina Bucșa (United Kingdom) Sarah Beth Grey (Italy) Dalila Spiteri
October 1	Charleston, United States; Hard $25,000; Singles and doubles draws	(Romania) Gabriela Talabă; 6–4, 6–7^{(5–7)}, 6–2	(United States) Elizabeth Halbauer	(United States) Hailey Baptiste (United States) Emma Navarro	(France) Shérazad Reix (United States) Kennedy Shaffer (United States) Nadja Gilchrist (Kazakhstan) Anna Danilina
October 1	Charleston, United States; Hard $25,000; Singles and doubles draws	(United States) Sophie Chang (United States) Alexandra Mueller; 6–4, 6–4	(Chinese Taipei) Hsu Chieh-yu (Romania) Gabriela Talabă	(United States) Hailey Baptiste (United States) Emma Navarro	(France) Shérazad Reix (United States) Kennedy Shaffer (United States) Nadja Gilchrist (Kazakhstan) Anna Danilina
October 1	Sozopol, Bulgaria; Hard $15,000; Singles and doubles draws	(Romania) Georgia Crăciun; 6–2, 6–1	(Turkey) İlay Yörük	(Germany) Franziska Kommer (Russia) Anna Ukolova	(Bulgaria) Julia Stamatova (Romania) Oana Smaranda Corneanu (Bulgaria) Gebriela Mihaylova (Romania) Oana Gavrilă
October 1	Sozopol, Bulgaria; Hard $15,000; Singles and doubles draws	(Russia) Alina Silich (Russia) Anna Ukolova; 6–3, 6–1	(Romania) Gabriela Duca (Romania) Maria Victoria Negoiță	(Germany) Franziska Kommer (Russia) Anna Ukolova	(Bulgaria) Julia Stamatova (Romania) Oana Smaranda Corneanu (Bulgaria) Gebriela Mihaylova (Romania) Oana Gavrilă
October 1	Sharm El Sheikh, Egypt; Hard $15,000; Singles and doubles draws	(Russia) Anastasia Sukhotina; 6–3, 6–0	(Russia) Viktoriia Kalinina	(Japan) Akiho Kakuya (Croatia) Ivana Topčić	(Sweden) Jacqueline Cabaj Awad (Russia) Ekaterina Makarova (United Kingdom) Aleksandra Pitak (United Kingdom) Katarzyna Pitak
October 1	Sharm El Sheikh, Egypt; Hard $15,000; Singles and doubles draws	(United Kingdom) Aleksandra Pitak (United Kingdom) Katarzyna Pitak; 6–2, 6–1	(Czech Republic) Nikola Břečková (Slovakia) Martina Fričová	(Japan) Akiho Kakuya (Croatia) Ivana Topčić	(Sweden) Jacqueline Cabaj Awad (Russia) Ekaterina Makarova (United Kingdom) Aleksandra Pitak (United Kingdom) Katarzyna Pitak
October 1	Herzliya, Israel; Hard $15,000; Singles and doubles draws	(Bulgaria) Dia Evtimova; 6–0, 6–3	(Israel) Tamara Barad Itzhaki	(Belarus) Sadafmoh Tolibova (Israel) Lina Glushko	(Israel) Shelly Bereznyak (Israel) Maya Tahan (United States) Haley Giavara (Israel) Nicole Nadel
October 1	Herzliya, Israel; Hard $15,000; Singles and doubles draws	(United States) Madeleine Kobelt (Israel) Maya Tahan; 6–4, 6–3	(Germany) Anastasia Reimchen (United States) Aimee Tarun	(Belarus) Sadafmoh Tolibova (Israel) Lina Glushko	(Israel) Shelly Bereznyak (Israel) Maya Tahan (United States) Haley Giavara (Israel) Nicole Nadel
October 1	Telde, Spain; Clay $15,000; Singles and doubles draws	(Spain) Claudia Hoste Ferrer; 6–4, 6–2	(Spain) Isabel Adrover Gallego	(Belgium) Catherine Chantraine (Czech Republic) Aneta Laboutková	(Spain) Ana Lantigua de la Nuez (Italy) Nuria Brancaccio (Spain) Carlota Molina Megías (Switzerland) Svenja Ochsner
October 1	Telde, Spain; Clay $15,000; Singles and doubles draws	(Czech Republic) Klára Hájková (Czech Republic) Aneta Laboutková; 1–6, 7–5, [10–5]	(Spain) Carlota Molina Megías (Belarus) Anastasiya Yakimova	(Belgium) Catherine Chantraine (Czech Republic) Aneta Laboutková	(Spain) Ana Lantigua de la Nuez (Italy) Nuria Brancaccio (Spain) Carlota Molina Megías (Switzerland) Svenja Ochsner
October 1	Monastir, Tunisia; Hard $15,000; Singles and doubles draws	(France) Constance Sibille; 6–4, 6–4	(Croatia) Silvia Njirić	(Germany) Natalia Siedliska (Italy) Miriana Tona	(Venezuela) Nadia Echeverría Alam (France) Yasmine Mansouri (Russia) Polina Kozyreva (Italy) Lisa Pigato
October 1	Monastir, Tunisia; Hard $15,000; Singles and doubles draws	(France) Loudmilla Bencheikh (France) Yasmine Mansouri; 6–4, 6–1	(Germany) Natalia Siedliska (Italy) Miriana Tona	(Germany) Natalia Siedliska (Italy) Miriana Tona	(Venezuela) Nadia Echeverría Alam (France) Yasmine Mansouri (Russia) Polina Kozyreva (Italy) Lisa Pigato
October 1	Antalya, Turkey; Hard $15,000; Singles and doubles draws	(Finland) Oona Orpana; 6–3, 2–6, 7–5	(Sweden) Alexandra Viktorovitch	(Turkey) Melis Sezer (Norway) Lilly Elida Håseth	(Serbia) Draginja Vuković (Russia) Alena Fomina (Poland) Paula Kania (Switzerland) Bojana Klincov
October 1	Antalya, Turkey; Hard $15,000; Singles and doubles draws	(Latvia) Alise Čerņecka (Finland) Oona Orpana; 6–4, 7–6^{(8–6)}	(Sweden) Alexandra Viktorovitch (Sweden) Lisa Zaar	(Turkey) Melis Sezer (Norway) Lilly Elida Håseth	(Serbia) Draginja Vuković (Russia) Alena Fomina (Poland) Paula Kania (Switzerland) Bojana Klincov
October 1	Chornomorsk, Ukraine; Clay $15,000; Singles and doubles draws	(Ukraine) Anastasiya Shoshyna; 6–3, 6–3	(Ukraine) Lyubov Kostenko	(Ukraine) Daria Snigur (Moldova) Anastasia Vdovenco	(Belarus) Kseniya Yersh (France) Carole Monnet (Serbia) Tamara Čurović (Ukraine) Mariia Bergen
October 1	Chornomorsk, Ukraine; Clay $15,000; Singles and doubles draws	(Poland) Weronika Falkowska (Ukraine) Anastasiya Shoshyna; 6–2, 6–1	(Belarus) Anastasiya Komar (Ukraine) Lyubov Kostenko	(Ukraine) Daria Snigur (Moldova) Anastasia Vdovenco	(Belarus) Kseniya Yersh (France) Carole Monnet (Serbia) Tamara Čurović (Ukraine) Mariia Bergen
October 8	Toowoomba, Australia; Hard $25,000; Singles and doubles draws	(Australia) Zoe Hives; 6–0, 6–2	(Australia) Ellen Perez	(Papua New Guinea) Abigail Tere-Apisah (Chinese Taipei) Lee Ya-hsuan	(Japan) Chihiro Muramatsu (Australia) Destanee Aiava (Australia) Astra Sharma (Australia) Abbie Myers
October 8	Toowoomba, Australia; Hard $25,000; Singles and doubles draws	(United Kingdom) Freya Christie (New Zealand) Erin Routliffe; 7–5, 6–4	(Australia) Samantha Harris (Australia) Astra Sharma	(Papua New Guinea) Abigail Tere-Apisah (Chinese Taipei) Lee Ya-hsuan	(Japan) Chihiro Muramatsu (Australia) Destanee Aiava (Australia) Astra Sharma (Australia) Abbie Myers
October 8	Cherbourg-en-Cotentin, France; Hard (indoor) $25,000; Singles and doubles draws	(France) Harmony Tan; 7–6^{(7–5)}, 6–3	(France) Loudmilla Bencheikh	(France) Myrtille Georges (United Kingdom) Maia Lumsden	(Turkey) Çağla Büyükakçay (France) Margot Yerolymos (France) Mallaurie Noël (United Kingdom) Eden Silva
October 8	Cherbourg-en-Cotentin, France; Hard (indoor) $25,000; Singles and doubles draws	(Poland) Katarzyna Piter (Czech Republic) Barbora Štefková; 6–2, 6–1	(United Kingdom) Alicia Barnett (United Kingdom) Eden Silva	(France) Myrtille Georges (United Kingdom) Maia Lumsden	(Turkey) Çağla Büyükakçay (France) Margot Yerolymos (France) Mallaurie Noël (United Kingdom) Eden Silva
October 8	Pula, Italy; Clay $25,000; Singles and doubles draws	(Italy) Martina Di Giuseppe; 6–4, 6–3	(Brazil) Gabriela Cé	(Germany) Stephanie Wagner (Hungary) Réka Luca Jani	(Egypt) Sandra Samir (Croatia) Lea Bošković (Ukraine) Maryna Chernyshova (Montenegro) Danka Kovinić
October 8	Pula, Italy; Clay $25,000; Singles and doubles draws	(Romania) Cristina Dinu (Hungary) Réka Luca Jani; 3–6, 6–1, [13–11]	(Italy) Giorgia Marchetti (Italy) Camilla Rosatello	(Germany) Stephanie Wagner (Hungary) Réka Luca Jani	(Egypt) Sandra Samir (Croatia) Lea Bošković (Ukraine) Maryna Chernyshova (Montenegro) Danka Kovinić
October 8	Makinohara, Japan; Carpet $25,000; Singles and doubles draws	(Japan) Momoko Kobori; 6–2, 6–3	(Japan) Junri Namigata	(Japan) Ayumi Miyamoto (Japan) Mana Ayukawa	(Japan) Shiho Akita (Japan) Michika Ozeki (Switzerland) Susan Bandecchi (Japan) Hiromi Abe
October 8	Makinohara, Japan; Carpet $25,000; Singles and doubles draws	(Japan) Kanako Morisaki (Japan) Minori Yonehara; 6–3, 6–1	(Japan) Chinatsu Shimizu (Japan) Ramu Ueda	(Japan) Ayumi Miyamoto (Japan) Mana Ayukawa	(Japan) Shiho Akita (Japan) Michika Ozeki (Switzerland) Susan Bandecchi (Japan) Hiromi Abe
October 8	Lagos, Nigeria; Hard $25,000; Singles and doubles draws	(India) Pranjala Yadlapalli; 6–1, 7–6^{(7–2)}	(Switzerland) Conny Perrin	(India) Riya Bhatia (Bulgaria) Julia Terziyska	(Slovakia) Tereza Mihalíková (Slovenia) Nastja Kolar (Sweden) Susanne Celik (Israel) Deniz Khazaniuk
October 8	Lagos, Nigeria; Hard $25,000; Singles and doubles draws	(Bulgaria) Julia Terziyska (Netherlands) Rosalie van der Hoek; 6–4, 6–4	(Netherlands) Merel Hoedt (Netherlands) Noa Liauw a Fong	(India) Riya Bhatia (Bulgaria) Julia Terziyska	(Slovakia) Tereza Mihalíková (Slovenia) Nastja Kolar (Sweden) Susanne Celik (Israel) Deniz Khazaniuk
October 8	Óbidos, Portugal; Carpet $25,000; Singles and doubles draws	(Czech Republic) Tereza Martincová; 7–6^{(7–3)}, 6–3	(Poland) Katarzyna Kawa	(Switzerland) Lisa Sabino (Netherlands) Michaëlla Krajicek	(Spain) Cristina Bucșa (Serbia) Natalija Kostić (Romania) Elena-Gabriela Ruse (Slovenia) Manca Pislak
October 8	Óbidos, Portugal; Carpet $25,000; Singles and doubles draws	(Netherlands) Michaëlla Krajicek (United States) Ingrid Neel; 6–2, 6–2	(Spain) Cristina Bucșa (Latvia) Diāna Marcinkēviča	(Switzerland) Lisa Sabino (Netherlands) Michaëlla Krajicek	(Spain) Cristina Bucșa (Serbia) Natalija Kostić (Romania) Elena-Gabriela Ruse (Slovenia) Manca Pislak
October 8	Riba-roja de Túria, Spain; Clay $25,000; Singles and doubles draws	(Belgium) Marie Benoît; 6–0, 7–6^{(7–2)}	(Spain) Aliona Bolsova Zadoinov	(Hungary) Anna Bondár (Romania) Irina Fetecău	(Romania) Miriam Bulgaru (Spain) Andrea Lázaro García (Mexico) Renata Zarazúa (Spain) Estrella Cabeza Candela
October 8	Riba-roja de Túria, Spain; Clay $25,000; Singles and doubles draws	(Spain) Aliona Bolsova Zadoinov (Greece) Despina Papamichail; 6–2, 6–2	(Spain) Marina Bassols Ribera (Spain) Ángela Fita Boluda	(Hungary) Anna Bondár (Romania) Irina Fetecău	(Romania) Miriam Bulgaru (Spain) Andrea Lázaro García (Mexico) Renata Zarazúa (Spain) Estrella Cabeza Candela
October 8	Sharm El Sheikh, Egypt; Hard $15,000; Singles and doubles draws	(Sweden) Jacqueline Cabaj Awad; 7–5, 6–3	(Egypt) Lamis Alhussein Abdel Aziz	(Czech Republic) Karolína Beránková (Czech Republic) Barbora Miklová	(Croatia) Ivana Topčić (Australia) Jelena Stojanovic (Serbia) Barbara Bonić (Russia) Anastasia Sukhotina
October 8	Sharm El Sheikh, Egypt; Hard $15,000; Singles and doubles draws	(Serbia) Barbara Bonić (Australia) Jelena Stojanovic; 6–4, 6–1	(Egypt) Ola Abou Zekry (Romania) Elena-Teodora Cadar	(Czech Republic) Karolína Beránková (Czech Republic) Barbora Miklová	(Croatia) Ivana Topčić (Australia) Jelena Stojanovic (Serbia) Barbara Bonić (Russia) Anastasia Sukhotina
October 8	Ashkelon, Israel; Hard $15,000; Singles and doubles draws	(Israel) Maya Tahan; 6–4, 6–3	(Russia) Anna Pribylova	(Israel) Lina Glushko (Slovakia) Katarína Kužmová	(Russia) Anastasia Pribylova (Hungary) Adrienn Nagy (Belarus) Sadafmoh Tolibova (Bulgaria) Dia Evtimova
October 8	Ashkelon, Israel; Hard $15,000; Singles and doubles draws	(Russia) Anastasia Pribylova (Russia) Anna Pribylova; 7–5, 6–4	(Hungary) Dorka Drahota-Szabó (Hungary) Adrienn Nagy	(Israel) Lina Glushko (Slovakia) Katarína Kužmová	(Russia) Anastasia Pribylova (Hungary) Adrienn Nagy (Belarus) Sadafmoh Tolibova (Bulgaria) Dia Evtimova
October 8	Monastir, Tunisia; Hard $15,000; Singles and doubles draws	(Romania) Ilona Georgiana Ghioroaie; 6–3, 4–1, ret.	(Belgium) Magali Kempen	(Italy) Miriana Tona (France) Constance Sibille	(Croatia) Silvia Njirić (United States) Jessica Ho (France) Emmanuelle Girard (France) Kélia Le Bihan
October 8	Monastir, Tunisia; Hard $15,000; Singles and doubles draws	(Croatia) Silvia Njirić (Italy) Miriana Tona; 1–6, 7–6^{(7–2)}, [10–4]	(Algeria) Amira Benaïssa (Malta) Elaine Genovese	(Italy) Miriana Tona (France) Constance Sibille	(Croatia) Silvia Njirić (United States) Jessica Ho (France) Emmanuelle Girard (France) Kélia Le Bihan
October 8	Antalya, Turkey; Hard $15,000; Singles and doubles draws	(Romania) Georgia Crăciun; 7–5, 5–7, 7–6^{(11–9)}	(Czech Republic) Magdaléna Pantůčková	(Serbia) Draginja Vuković (Belgium) Eliessa Vanlangendonck	(Czech Republic) Johana Marková (Turkey) Melis Sezer (Turkey) İpek Öz (Russia) Daria Nazarkina
October 8	Antalya, Turkey; Hard $15,000; Singles and doubles draws	(Romania) Georgia Crăciun (Russia) Alena Fomina; 7–5, 7–6^{(7–4)}	(Turkey) Cemre Anıl (Turkey) Melis Sezer	(Serbia) Draginja Vuković (Belgium) Eliessa Vanlangendonck	(Czech Republic) Johana Marková (Turkey) Melis Sezer (Turkey) İpek Öz (Russia) Daria Nazarkina
October 15	Suzhou Ladies Open; Suzhou, China; Hard $100,000; Singles – Doubles	(China) Zheng Saisai; 7–5, 6–1	(Slovakia) Jana Čepelová	(Bulgaria) Viktoriya Tomova (Ukraine) Anhelina Kalinina	(Australia) Arina Rodionova (United Kingdom) Katie Boulter (Japan) Nao Hibino (China) Han Xinyun
October 15	Suzhou Ladies Open; Suzhou, China; Hard $100,000; Singles – Doubles	(Japan) Misaki Doi (Japan) Nao Hibino; 6–2, 6–3	(Thailand) Luksika Kumkhum (Thailand) Peangtarn Plipuech	(Bulgaria) Viktoriya Tomova (Ukraine) Anhelina Kalinina	(Australia) Arina Rodionova (United Kingdom) Katie Boulter (Japan) Nao Hibino (China) Han Xinyun
October 15	Open de Touraine; Joué-lès-Tours, France; Hard (indoor) $25,000; Singles and doubles draws	(France) Chloé Paquet; 7–6^{(7–5)}, 6–2	(France) Myrtille Georges	(France) Tessah Andrianjafitrimo (France) Amandine Hesse	(Latvia) Diāna Marcinkēviča (France) Julie Gervais (Netherlands) Bibiane Schoofs (Poland) Magdalena Fręch
October 15	Open de Touraine; Joué-lès-Tours, France; Hard (indoor) $25,000; Singles and doubles draws	(Poland) Magdalena Fręch (Netherlands) Bibiane Schoofs; 5–7, 6–2, [10–3]	(Czech Republic) Miriam Kolodziejová (Czech Republic) Jesika Malečková	(France) Tessah Andrianjafitrimo (France) Amandine Hesse	(Latvia) Diāna Marcinkēviča (France) Julie Gervais (Netherlands) Bibiane Schoofs (Poland) Magdalena Fręch
October 15	Pula, Italy; Clay $25,000; Singles and doubles draws	(Spain) Sara Sorribes Tormo; 6–4, 6–3	(Russia) Amina Anshba	(Italy) Anastasia Grymalska (China) Ma Shuyue	(Switzerland) Ylena In-Albon (Montenegro) Danka Kovinić (Brazil) Carolina Alves (Romania) Cristina Dinu
October 15	Pula, Italy; Clay $25,000; Singles and doubles draws	(Italy) Martina Colmegna (Italy) Federica Di Sarra; 6–4, 7–6^{(7–1)}	(Croatia) Lea Bošković (Romania) Cristina Dinu	(Italy) Anastasia Grymalska (China) Ma Shuyue	(Switzerland) Ylena In-Albon (Montenegro) Danka Kovinić (Brazil) Carolina Alves (Romania) Cristina Dinu
October 15	Hamamatsu, Japan; Carpet $25,000; Singles and doubles draws	(Japan) Ayano Shimizu; 6–3, 6–4	(Japan) Mana Ayukawa	(Japan) Junri Namigata (Japan) Riko Sawayanagi	(Japan) Mei Yamaguchi (United States) Naomi Cheong (Switzerland) Susan Bandecchi (Sweden) Marina Yudanov
October 15	Hamamatsu, Japan; Carpet $25,000; Singles and doubles draws	(Japan) Erina Hayashi (Japan) Miharu Imanishi; 7–5, 6–4	(Japan) Momoko Kobori (Japan) Ayano Shimizu	(Japan) Junri Namigata (Japan) Riko Sawayanagi	(Japan) Mei Yamaguchi (United States) Naomi Cheong (Switzerland) Susan Bandecchi (Sweden) Marina Yudanov
October 15	Seville, Spain; Clay $25,000; Singles and doubles draws	(Hungary) Anna Bondár; 6–2, 5–7, 6–2	(Turkey) Başak Eraydın	(France) Jade Suvrijn (Spain) Nuria Párrizas Díaz	(Argentina) Paula Ormaechea (Russia) Daria Mishina (Spain) Andrea Lázaro García (Venezuela) Andrea Gámiz
October 15	Seville, Spain; Clay $25,000; Singles and doubles draws	(Venezuela) Andrea Gámiz (Argentina) Paula Ormaechea; 7–5, 7–6^{(7–5)}	(Turkey) Başak Eraydın (Russia) Anastasiya Komardina	(France) Jade Suvrijn (Spain) Nuria Párrizas Díaz	(Argentina) Paula Ormaechea (Russia) Daria Mishina (Spain) Andrea Lázaro García (Venezuela) Andrea Gámiz
October 15	Florence, United States; Hard $25,000; Singles and doubles draws	(Canada) Bianca Andreescu; 6–4, 2–6, 6–3	(Japan) Mari Osaka	(United States) Katie Volynets (United States) Maria Mateas	(France) Shérazad Reix (Brazil) Paula Cristina Gonçalves (United States) Robin Anderson (Canada) Françoise Abanda
October 15	Florence, United States; Hard $25,000; Singles and doubles draws	(Kazakhstan) Anna Danilina (Norway) Ulrikke Eikeri; 6–7^{(9–11)}, 6–2, [10–8]	(United Kingdom) Tara Moore (Switzerland) Conny Perrin	(United States) Katie Volynets (United States) Maria Mateas	(France) Shérazad Reix (Brazil) Paula Cristina Gonçalves (United States) Robin Anderson (Canada) Françoise Abanda
October 15	Sharm El Sheikh, Egypt; Hard $15,000; Singles and doubles draws	(Slovenia) Nastja Kolar; 6–1, 6–1	(Russia) Anastasia Sukhotina	(Russia) Ekaterina Makarova (Sweden) Linnéa Malmqvist	(Czech Republic) Barbora Miklová (United Kingdom) Katarzyna Pitak (Australia) Jelena Stojanovic (Czech Republic) Karolína Beránková
October 15	Sharm El Sheikh, Egypt; Hard $15,000; Singles and doubles draws	(Belgium) Chelsea Vanhoutte (United States) Amber Washington; 6–4, 7–6^{(7–5)}	(India) Ashmitha Easwaramurthi (Chinese Taipei) Hsieh Yu-ting	(Russia) Ekaterina Makarova (Sweden) Linnéa Malmqvist	(Czech Republic) Barbora Miklová (United Kingdom) Katarzyna Pitak (Australia) Jelena Stojanovic (Czech Republic) Karolína Beránková
October 15	Ofakim, Israel; Hard $15,000; Singles and doubles draws	(Bulgaria) Dia Evtimova; 6–4, 3–6, 7–6^{(8–6)}	(Russia) Anastasia Pribylova	(Israel) Maya Tahan (Greece) Galateia Mesochoritou	(Israel) Yuval Keren (United States) Haley Giavara (Israel) Shahar Biran (Slovakia) Romana Čisovská
October 15	Ofakim, Israel; Hard $15,000; Singles and doubles draws	(Russia) Anastasia Pribylova (Russia) Anna Pribylova; Walkover	(Russia) Anna Iakovleva (Belarus) Sadafmoh Tolibova	(Israel) Maya Tahan (Greece) Galateia Mesochoritou	(Israel) Yuval Keren (United States) Haley Giavara (Israel) Shahar Biran (Slovakia) Romana Čisovská
October 15	Cantanhede, Portugal; Carpet $15,000; Singles and doubles draws	(Slovenia) Manca Pislak; 6–2, 6–1	(France) Carole Monnet	(Hungary) Dorka Drahota-Szabó (Spain) Gemma Lairón Navarro	(Portugal) Francisca Jorge (Slovenia) Kristina Novak (United Kingdom) Anna Popescu (France) Aminata Sall
October 15	Cantanhede, Portugal; Carpet $15,000; Singles and doubles draws	(Germany) Katharina Hering (Slovenia) Manca Pislak; 6–4, 2–6, [10–8]	(Portugal) Francisca Jorge (United Kingdom) Anna Popescu	(Hungary) Dorka Drahota-Szabó (Spain) Gemma Lairón Navarro	(Portugal) Francisca Jorge (Slovenia) Kristina Novak (United Kingdom) Anna Popescu (France) Aminata Sall
October 15	Monastir, Tunisia; Hard $15,000; Singles and doubles draws	(Romania) Ilona Georgiana Ghioroaie; 6–3, 4–6, 6–1	(Czech Republic) Nikola Tomanová	(Netherlands) Dominique Karregat (Italy) Federica Prati	(France) Manon Peral (Poland) Joanna Zawadzka (Czech Republic) Kristýna Hrabalová (Algeria) Amira Benaïssa
October 15	Monastir, Tunisia; Hard $15,000; Singles and doubles draws	(Romania) Ilona Georgiana Ghioroaie (Italy) Miriana Tona; 6–2, 6–2	(Netherlands) Dominique Karregat (Netherlands) Annick Melgers	(Netherlands) Dominique Karregat (Italy) Federica Prati	(France) Manon Peral (Poland) Joanna Zawadzka (Czech Republic) Kristýna Hrabalová (Algeria) Amira Benaïssa
October 15	Antalya, Turkey; Hard $15,000; Singles and doubles draws	(United Kingdom) Emma Raducanu; 6–4, 6–2	(Czech Republic) Johana Marková	(Slovakia) Timea Jarušková (Russia) Alena Fomina	(Czech Republic) Magdaléna Pantůčková (Slovenia) Nika Radišič (Belgium) Eliessa Vanlangendonck (Romania) Georgia Crăciun
October 15	Antalya, Turkey; Hard $15,000; Singles and doubles draws	(Czech Republic) Johana Marková (Czech Republic) Magdaléna Pantůčková; 6–1, 6–0	(Ukraine) Polina Gubina (Ukraine) Anastasiya Vasylyeva	(Slovakia) Timea Jarušková (Russia) Alena Fomina	(Czech Republic) Magdaléna Pantůčková (Slovenia) Nika Radišič (Belgium) Eliessa Vanlangendonck (Romania) Georgia Crăciun
October 22	Internationaux Féminins de la Vienne; Poitiers, France; Hard (indoor) $80,000; Singles – Doubles	(Switzerland) Viktorija Golubic; 3–6, 6–1, 7–5	(Russia) Natalia Vikhlyantseva	(Romania) Monica Niculescu (Czech Republic) Tereza Smitková	(France) Pauline Parmentier (Russia) Anna Blinkova (Poland) Magdalena Fręch (Netherlands) Arantxa Rus
October 22	Internationaux Féminins de la Vienne; Poitiers, France; Hard (indoor) $80,000; Singles – Doubles	(Russia) Anna Blinkova (Russia) Alexandra Panova; 6–1, 6–1	(Switzerland) Viktorija Golubic (Netherlands) Arantxa Rus	(Romania) Monica Niculescu (Czech Republic) Tereza Smitková	(France) Pauline Parmentier (Russia) Anna Blinkova (Poland) Magdalena Fręch (Netherlands) Arantxa Rus
October 22	Mercer Tennis Classic; Macon, United States; Hard $80,000; Singles – Doubles	(United States) Varvara Lepchenko; 6–4, 6–4	(Paraguay) Verónica Cepede Royg	(United States) Allie Kiick (Czech Republic) Marie Bouzková	(United States) Danielle Lao (United States) Kayla Day (United States) Hailey Baptiste (United States) Jessica Pegula
October 22	Mercer Tennis Classic; Macon, United States; Hard $80,000; Singles – Doubles	(United States) Caty McNally (United States) Jessica Pegula; 6–1, 5–7, [11–9]	(Kazakhstan) Anna Danilina (United States) Ingrid Neel	(United States) Allie Kiick (Czech Republic) Marie Bouzková	(United States) Danielle Lao (United States) Kayla Day (United States) Hailey Baptiste (United States) Jessica Pegula
October 22	Bendigo Women's International; Bendigo, Australia; Hard $60,000; Singles – Doubles	(Australia) Priscilla Hon; 6–4, 4–6, 7–5	(Australia) Ellen Perez	(Australia) Lizette Cabrera (United Kingdom) Gabriella Taylor	(Papua New Guinea) Abigail Tere-Apisah (Australia) Destanee Aiava (Australia) Astra Sharma (Australia) Olivia Rogowska
October 22	Bendigo Women's International; Bendigo, Australia; Hard $60,000; Singles – Doubles	(Australia) Ellen Perez (Australia) Arina Rodionova; 7–5, 6–1	(Japan) Eri Hozumi (Japan) Risa Ozaki	(Australia) Lizette Cabrera (United Kingdom) Gabriella Taylor	(Papua New Guinea) Abigail Tere-Apisah (Australia) Destanee Aiava (Australia) Astra Sharma (Australia) Olivia Rogowska
October 22	Challenger de Saguenay; Saguenay, Canada; Hard (indoor) $60,000; Singles – Doubles	(Canada) Katherine Sebov; 7–6^{(12–10)}, 7–6^{(7–4)}	(Netherlands) Quirine Lemoine	(Ukraine) Daria Lopatetskaya (Canada) Bianca Andreescu	(Ukraine) Kateryna Kozlova (France) Jessika Ponchet (Netherlands) Richèl Hogenkamp (Switzerland) Conny Perrin
October 22	Challenger de Saguenay; Saguenay, Canada; Hard (indoor) $60,000; Singles – Doubles	(United Kingdom) Tara Moore (Switzerland) Conny Perrin; 6–0, 5–7, [10–7]	(Canada) Sharon Fichman (United States) Maria Sanchez	(Ukraine) Daria Lopatetskaya (Canada) Bianca Andreescu	(Ukraine) Kateryna Kozlova (France) Jessika Ponchet (Netherlands) Richèl Hogenkamp (Switzerland) Conny Perrin
October 22	Nanning, China; Hard $25,000; Singles and doubles draws	(China) Han Xinyun; 6–4, 2–6, 6–4	(India) Karman Thandi	(South Korea) Jang Su-jeong (Israel) Julia Glushko	(China) Zhang Kailin (Thailand) Peangtarn Plipuech (United Kingdom) Katie Swan (Kazakhstan) Elena Rybakina
October 22	Nanning, China; Hard $25,000; Singles and doubles draws	(South Korea) Kim Na-ri (China) Ye Qiuyu; 6–3, 6–0	(China) Feng Shuo (China) Guo Hanyu	(South Korea) Jang Su-jeong (Israel) Julia Glushko	(China) Zhang Kailin (Thailand) Peangtarn Plipuech (United Kingdom) Katie Swan (Kazakhstan) Elena Rybakina
October 22	Pula, Italy; Clay $25,000; Singles and doubles draws	(Slovenia) Kaja Juvan; 3–6, 6–1, 6–2	(Russia) Polina Leykina	(Switzerland) Ylena In-Albon (Chile) Fernanda Brito	(Slovenia) Nina Potočnik (Czech Republic) Anastasia Zarycká (United States) Chiara Scholl (Italy) Anastasia Grymalska
October 22	Pula, Italy; Clay $25,000; Singles and doubles draws	(Russia) Valentina Ivakhnenko (Czech Republic) Anastasia Zarycká; 6–2, 6–4	(Romania) Cristina Dinu (Italy) Camilla Rosatello	(Switzerland) Ylena In-Albon (Chile) Fernanda Brito	(Slovenia) Nina Potočnik (Czech Republic) Anastasia Zarycká (United States) Chiara Scholl (Italy) Anastasia Grymalska
October 22	Oslo, Norway; Hard (indoor) $25,000; Singles and doubles draws	(United Kingdom) Harriet Dart; 6–2, 1–0, ret.	(Spain) Paula Badosa Gibert	(Netherlands) Lesley Kerkhove (Russia) Valeria Savinykh	(Poland) Katarzyna Piter (France) Chloé Paquet (Russia) Varvara Gracheva (Belgium) Hélène Scholsen
October 22	Oslo, Norway; Hard (indoor) $25,000; Singles and doubles draws	(United Kingdom) Harriet Dart (Sweden) Cornelia Lister; 7–6^{(7–3)}, 7–5	(Romania) Laura-Ioana Andrei (Belgium) Hélène Scholsen	(Netherlands) Lesley Kerkhove (Russia) Valeria Savinykh	(Poland) Katarzyna Piter (France) Chloé Paquet (Russia) Varvara Gracheva (Belgium) Hélène Scholsen
October 22	Istanbul, Turkey; Hard (indoor) $25,000; Singles and doubles draws	(Romania) Raluca Șerban; 6–2, 7–5	(Serbia) Nina Stojanović	(North Macedonia) Lina Gjorcheska (Romania) Elena-Gabriela Ruse	(Russia) Daria Kruzhkova (Croatia) Ana Vrljić (Russia) Polina Monova (Turkey) Çağla Büyükakçay
October 22	Istanbul, Turkey; Hard (indoor) $25,000; Singles and doubles draws	(Russia) Ekaterina Kazionova (Russia) Polina Monova; 6–3, 6–7^{(5–7)}, [10–6]	(Croatia) Tereza Mrdeža (Serbia) Nina Stojanović	(North Macedonia) Lina Gjorcheska (Romania) Elena-Gabriela Ruse	(Russia) Daria Kruzhkova (Croatia) Ana Vrljić (Russia) Polina Monova (Turkey) Çağla Büyükakçay
October 22	Sharm El Sheikh, Egypt; Hard $15,000; Singles and doubles draws	(Romania) Elena-Teodora Cadar; 6–4, 3–6, 6–0	(Russia) Anna Morgina	(India) Vaidehi Chaudhari (Germany) Jantje Tilbürger	(Moldova) Anastasia Vdovenco (Sweden) Linnéa Malmqvist (Czech Republic) Ivana Šebestová (Switzerland) Jenny Dürst
October 22	Sharm El Sheikh, Egypt; Hard $15,000; Singles and doubles draws	(Russia) Anna Morgina (Australia) Jelena Stojanovic; 6–3, 6–3	(Russia) Ulyana Ayzatulina (Romania) Elena-Teodora Cadar	(India) Vaidehi Chaudhari (Germany) Jantje Tilbürger	(Moldova) Anastasia Vdovenco (Sweden) Linnéa Malmqvist (Czech Republic) Ivana Šebestová (Switzerland) Jenny Dürst
October 22	Lousada, Portugal; Hard (indoor) $15,000; Singles and doubles draws	(Portugal) Francisca Jorge; 6–3, 3–6, 7–6^{(7–4)}	(France) Aubane Droguet	(Germany) Katharina Hering (Germany) Carmen Schultheiss	(Italy) Valentina Losciale (France) Marie Mattel (Denmark) Olga Helmi (Bolivia) Noelia Zeballos
October 22	Lousada, Portugal; Hard (indoor) $15,000; Singles and doubles draws	(Germany) Katharina Hering (Spain) Olga Parres Azcoitia; 6–2, 6–2	(Portugal) Francisca Jorge (Estonia) Maileen Nuudi	(Germany) Katharina Hering (Germany) Carmen Schultheiss	(Italy) Valentina Losciale (France) Marie Mattel (Denmark) Olga Helmi (Bolivia) Noelia Zeballos
October 22	Stockholm, Sweden; Hard (indoor) $15,000; Singles and doubles draws	(Finland) Anastasia Kulikova; 7–5, 6–3	(United Kingdom) Tiffany William	(Russia) Ekaterina Reyngold (Sweden) Lisa Zaar	(United Kingdom) Alice Gillan (Finland) Mariella Minetti (Sweden) Melis Yasar (Russia) Angelina Zhuravleva
October 22	Stockholm, Sweden; Hard (indoor) $15,000; Singles and doubles draws	(Sweden) Alexandra Viktorovitch (Sweden) Lisa Zaar; 7–5, 7–5	(Finland) Anastasia Kulikova (Estonia) Elena Malõgina	(Russia) Ekaterina Reyngold (Sweden) Lisa Zaar	(United Kingdom) Alice Gillan (Finland) Mariella Minetti (Sweden) Melis Yasar (Russia) Angelina Zhuravleva
October 22	Monastir, Tunisia; Hard $15,000; Singles and doubles draws	(Czech Republic) Nikola Tomanová; 7–5, 6–3	(Croatia) Silvia Njirić	(Czech Republic) Denisa Hindová (Netherlands) Merel Hoedt	(Tunisia) Chiraz Bechri (Malta) Elaine Genovese (Belgium) Catherine Chantraine (Italy) Angelica Raggi
October 22	Monastir, Tunisia; Hard $15,000; Singles and doubles draws	(Czech Republic) Kristýna Hrabalová (Czech Republic) Nikola Tomanová; 6–2, 3–6, [11–9]	(Croatia) Silvia Njirić (Poland) Joanna Zawadzka	(Czech Republic) Denisa Hindová (Netherlands) Merel Hoedt	(Tunisia) Chiraz Bechri (Malta) Elaine Genovese (Belgium) Catherine Chantraine (Italy) Angelica Raggi
October 29	RBC Pro Challenge; Tyler, United States; Hard $80,000; Singles – Doubles	(United States) Whitney Osuigwe; 6–3, 6–4	(Brazil) Beatriz Haddad Maia	(Switzerland) Belinda Bencic (United States) Danielle Lao	(United States) Kayla Day (United States) Caty McNally (Bulgaria) Sesil Karatantcheva (United States) Lauren Davis
October 29	RBC Pro Challenge; Tyler, United States; Hard $80,000; Singles – Doubles	(United States) Nicole Gibbs (United States) Asia Muhammad; 3–6, 6–3, [14–12]	(United States) Desirae Krawczyk (Mexico) Giuliana Olmos	(Switzerland) Belinda Bencic (United States) Danielle Lao	(United States) Kayla Day (United States) Caty McNally (Bulgaria) Sesil Karatantcheva (United States) Lauren Davis
October 29	Canberra Tennis International; Canberra, Australia; Hard $60,000; Singles – Doubles	(Australia) Zoe Hives; 6–4, 6–2	(Australia) Olivia Rogowska	(Australia) Astra Sharma (Australia) Isabelle Wallace	(Japan) Risa Ozaki (France) Irina Ramialison (Australia) Naiktha Bains (Australia) Kaylah McPhee
October 29	Canberra Tennis International; Canberra, Australia; Hard $60,000; Singles – Doubles	(Australia) Ellen Perez (Australia) Arina Rodionova; 6–7^{(5–7)}, 6–3, [10–7]	(Australia) Destanee Aiava (Australia) Naiktha Bains	(Australia) Astra Sharma (Australia) Isabelle Wallace	(Japan) Risa Ozaki (France) Irina Ramialison (Australia) Naiktha Bains (Australia) Kaylah McPhee
October 29	Tevlin Women's Challenger; Toronto, Canada; Hard (indoor) $60,000; Singles – Doubles	(Netherlands) Quirine Lemoine; 6–2, 6–3	(Ukraine) Kateryna Kozlova	(France) Jessika Ponchet (Canada) Bianca Andreescu	(France) Shérazad Reix (Belgium) Kimberley Zimmermann (United States) Robin Anderson (Ukraine) Daria Lopatetskaya
October 29	Tevlin Women's Challenger; Toronto, Canada; Hard (indoor) $60,000; Singles – Doubles	(Canada) Sharon Fichman (United States) Maria Sanchez; 6–0, 6–4	(Poland) Maja Chwalińska (Bulgaria) Elitsa Kostova	(France) Jessika Ponchet (Canada) Bianca Andreescu	(France) Shérazad Reix (Belgium) Kimberley Zimmermann (United States) Robin Anderson (Ukraine) Daria Lopatetskaya
October 29	Liuzhou International Challenger; Liuzhou, China; Hard $60,000; Singles – Doubles	(China) Wang Yafan; 6–4, 6–2	(South Korea) Han Na-lae	(United Kingdom) Katie Swan (China) Wang Xinyu	(China) Zhang Kailin (China) You Xiaodi (China) Liu Fangzhou (Germany) Sarah-Rebecca Sekulic
October 29	Liuzhou International Challenger; Liuzhou, China; Hard $60,000; Singles – Doubles	(Hong Kong) Eudice Chong (China) Ye Qiuyu; 7–5, 6–3	(China) Kang Jiaqi (South Korea) Lee So-ra	(United Kingdom) Katie Swan (China) Wang Xinyu	(China) Zhang Kailin (China) You Xiaodi (China) Liu Fangzhou (Germany) Sarah-Rebecca Sekulic
October 29	Open Nantes Atlantique; Nantes, France; Hard (indoor) $25,000; Singles and doubles draws	(Switzerland) Timea Bacsinszky; 6–4, 3–6, 6–1	(France) Amandine Hesse	(Russia) Polina Monova (Uzbekistan) Akgul Amanmuradova	(United States) Jamie Loeb (France) Mallaurie Noël (Switzerland) Tess Sugnaux (France) Lou Adler
October 29	Open Nantes Atlantique; Nantes, France; Hard (indoor) $25,000; Singles and doubles draws	(France) Estelle Cascino (France) Elixane Lechemia; 7–5, 6–4	(Uzbekistan) Akgul Amanmuradova (Russia) Alina Silich	(Russia) Polina Monova (Uzbekistan) Akgul Amanmuradova	(United States) Jamie Loeb (France) Mallaurie Noël (Switzerland) Tess Sugnaux (France) Lou Adler
October 29	Pula, Italy; Clay $25,000; Singles and doubles draws	(Russia) Valentina Ivakhnenko; 6–2, 6–1	(Slovenia) Pia Čuk	(Italy) Martina Trevisan (Croatia) Lea Bošković	(Ukraine) Ganna Poznikhirenko (Italy) Martina Caregaro (France) Diane Parry (Romania) Cristina Ene
October 29	Pula, Italy; Clay $25,000; Singles and doubles draws	(Romania) Cristina Dinu (Romania) Andreea Mitu; Walkover	(Italy) Federica Di Sarra (Italy) Anastasia Grymalska	(Italy) Martina Trevisan (Croatia) Lea Bošković	(Ukraine) Ganna Poznikhirenko (Italy) Martina Caregaro (France) Diane Parry (Romania) Cristina Ene
October 29	Pétange, Luxembourg; Hard (indoor) $25,000; Singles and doubles draws	(Luxembourg) Mandy Minella; 6–2, 6–1	(Belgium) Hélène Scholsen	(Serbia) Nina Stojanović (Russia) Ekaterina Yashina	(Bulgaria) Isabella Shinikova (Netherlands) Michaëlla Krajicek (Czech Republic) Johana Marková (Luxembourg) Eléonora Molinaro
October 29	Pétange, Luxembourg; Hard (indoor) $25,000; Singles and doubles draws	(Russia) Anastasia Pribylova (Serbia) Nina Stojanović; 2–6, 6–2, [10–8]	(Poland) Katarzyna Piter (Slovakia) Chantal Škamlová	(Serbia) Nina Stojanović (Russia) Ekaterina Yashina	(Bulgaria) Isabella Shinikova (Netherlands) Michaëlla Krajicek (Czech Republic) Johana Marková (Luxembourg) Eléonora Molinaro
October 29	Sant Cugat del Vallès, Spain; Clay $25,000; Singles and doubles draws	(Spain) Olga Sáez Larra; 6–1, 1–0, ret.	(Romania) Andreea Roșca	(Spain) Rebeka Masarova (Spain) Marina Bassols Ribera	(France) Jade Suvrijn (Spain) Cristina Bucșa (Spain) Yvonne Cavallé Reimers (Venezuela) Andrea Gámiz
October 29	Sant Cugat del Vallès, Spain; Clay $25,000; Singles and doubles draws	(Romania) Miriam Bulgaru (Romania) Nicoleta Dascălu; 6–1, 4–6, [10–7]	(Romania) Andreea Roșca (Mexico) Renata Zarazúa	(Spain) Rebeka Masarova (Spain) Marina Bassols Ribera	(France) Jade Suvrijn (Spain) Cristina Bucșa (Spain) Yvonne Cavallé Reimers (Venezuela) Andrea Gámiz
October 29	Wirral, United Kingdom; Hard (indoor) $25,000; Singles and doubles draws	(Latvia) Diāna Marcinkēviča; 7–6^{(7–2)}, 0–6, 7–6^{(7–4)}	(Netherlands) Arantxa Rus	(Russia) Valeria Savinykh (United Kingdom) Emma Raducanu	(Romania) Laura-Ioana Andrei (France) Harmony Tan (Turkey) Çağla Büyükakçay (Belgium) Greet Minnen
October 29	Wirral, United Kingdom; Hard (indoor) $25,000; Singles and doubles draws	(United Kingdom) Freya Christie (Russia) Valeria Savinykh; 6–4, 7–5	(United Kingdom) Sarah Beth Grey (United Kingdom) Olivia Nicholls	(Russia) Valeria Savinykh (United Kingdom) Emma Raducanu	(Romania) Laura-Ioana Andrei (France) Harmony Tan (Turkey) Çağla Büyükakçay (Belgium) Greet Minnen
October 29	Sharm El Sheikh, Egypt; Hard $15,000; Singles and doubles draws	(Russia) Anna Morgina; 6–2, 6–7^{(6–8)}, 6–1	(Switzerland) Sandy Marti	(Bosnia and Herzegovina) Jelena Simić (Ukraine) Anastasiya Shoshyna	(Romania) Elena-Teodora Cadar (Argentina) Agustina Chlpac (Moldova) Anastasia Vdovenco (Russia) Ekaterina Makarova
October 29	Sharm El Sheikh, Egypt; Hard $15,000; Singles and doubles draws	(Egypt) Ola Abou Zekry (Germany) Linda Prenkovic; 6–4, 6–1	(Netherlands) Gabriella Mujan (Netherlands) Margriet Timmermans	(Bosnia and Herzegovina) Jelena Simić (Ukraine) Anastasiya Shoshyna	(Romania) Elena-Teodora Cadar (Argentina) Agustina Chlpac (Moldova) Anastasia Vdovenco (Russia) Ekaterina Makarova
October 29	Heraklion, Greece; Clay $15,000; Singles and doubles draws	(Switzerland) Xenia Knoll; 6–2, 7–5	(Bulgaria) Ani Vangelova	(United States) Haley Giavara (United States) Josie Kuhlman	(Israel) Maya Tahan (Russia) Darya Astakhova (Greece) Galateia Mesochoritou (Greece) Eleni Mtsentlitze
October 29	Heraklion, Greece; Clay $15,000; Singles and doubles draws	(Romania) Oana Gavrilă (Israel) Maya Tahan; 6–3, 1–6, [10–3]	(Poland) Anna Hertel (Switzerland) Xenia Knoll	(United States) Haley Giavara (United States) Josie Kuhlman	(Israel) Maya Tahan (Russia) Darya Astakhova (Greece) Galateia Mesochoritou (Greece) Eleni Mtsentlitze
October 29	Mexico City, Mexico; Hard $15,000; Singles and doubles draws	(Russia) Anastasiya Rychagova; 6–3, 7–5	(United States) Charlotte Chavatipon	(Brazil) Alice Garcia (Guatemala) Melissa Morales	(Guatemala) Kirsten-Andrea Weedon (United States) Rushri Wijesundera (Canada) Raphaëlle Lacasse (Mexico) María Fernanda Carvajal Altamirano
October 29	Mexico City, Mexico; Hard $15,000; Singles and doubles draws	(Mexico) Jessica Hinojosa Gómez (Russia) Anastasiya Rychagova; 6–1, 6–4	(Mexico) María Fernanda Carvajal Altamirano (Canada) Raphaëlle Lacasse	(Brazil) Alice Garcia (Guatemala) Melissa Morales	(Guatemala) Kirsten-Andrea Weedon (United States) Rushri Wijesundera (Canada) Raphaëlle Lacasse (Mexico) María Fernanda Carvajal Altamirano
October 29	Lousada, Portugal; Hard (indoor) $15,000; Singles and doubles draws	(Portugal) Francisca Jorge; 7–6^{(7–3)}, 6–0	(Spain) Alba Carrillo Marín	(Romania) Ioana Loredana Roșca (Poland) Paula Kania	(Switzerland) Katerina Tsygourova (Portugal) Maria Inês Fonte (Bolivia) Noelia Zeballos (France) Aubane Droguet
October 29	Lousada, Portugal; Hard (indoor) $15,000; Singles and doubles draws	(Spain) Olga Parres Azcoitia (Romania) Ioana Loredana Roșca; 6–2, 6–2	(Spain) Alba Carrillo Marín (Bolivia) Noelia Zeballos	(Romania) Ioana Loredana Roșca (Poland) Paula Kania	(Switzerland) Katerina Tsygourova (Portugal) Maria Inês Fonte (Bolivia) Noelia Zeballos (France) Aubane Droguet
October 29	Stockholm, Sweden; Hard (indoor) $15,000; Singles and doubles draws	(Finland) Anastasia Kulikova; 6–7^{(5–7)}, 6–2, 6–4	(Sweden) Jacqueline Cabaj Awad	(United Kingdom) Tiffany William (Russia) Angelina Zhuravleva	(Estonia) Elena Malõgina (Russia) Ekaterina Reyngold (Russia) Elina Vikhrianova (Finland) Oona Orpana
October 29	Stockholm, Sweden; Hard (indoor) $15,000; Singles and doubles draws	(Russia) Anna Makhorkina (Finland) Oona Orpana; Walkover	(Sweden) Anette Munozova (Germany) Shaline-Doreen Pipa	(United Kingdom) Tiffany William (Russia) Angelina Zhuravleva	(Estonia) Elena Malõgina (Russia) Ekaterina Reyngold (Russia) Elina Vikhrianova (Finland) Oona Orpana
October 29	Nonthaburi, Thailand; Hard $15,000; Singles and doubles draws	(Chinese Taipei) Lee Hua-chen; 6–4, 6–4	(Thailand) Nudnida Luangnam	(Thailand) Anchisa Chanta (Chinese Taipei) Lee Ya-hsin	(Thailand) Watsachol Sawatdee (South Korea) Kim Se-hyun (Thailand) Chanikarn Silakul (Thailand) Tamachan Momkoonthod
October 29	Nonthaburi, Thailand; Hard $15,000; Singles and doubles draws	(Thailand) Chompoothip Jundakate (Chinese Taipei) Lee Hua-chen; 6–1, 6–3	(Kazakhstan) Dariya Detkovskaya (Thailand) Supapitch Kuearum	(Thailand) Anchisa Chanta (Chinese Taipei) Lee Ya-hsin	(Thailand) Watsachol Sawatdee (South Korea) Kim Se-hyun (Thailand) Chanikarn Silakul (Thailand) Tamachan Momkoonthod
October 29	Monastir, Tunisia; Hard $15,000; Singles and doubles draws	(Italy) Angelica Raggi; 5–7, 6–1, 6–3	(Italy) Giulia Crescenzi	(Serbia) Tamara Čurović (Czech Republic) Denisa Hindová	(France) Caroline Roméo (Hungary) Zita Kovács (Russia) Polina Kozyreva (Belgium) Eliessa Vanlangendonck
October 29	Monastir, Tunisia; Hard $15,000; Singles and doubles draws	(Serbia) Tamara Čurović (Belgium) Eliessa Vanlangendonck; 6–0, 6–3	(United States) Jessie Aney (United Kingdom) Olivia Sonnekus-Williams	(Serbia) Tamara Čurović (Czech Republic) Denisa Hindová	(France) Caroline Roméo (Hungary) Zita Kovács (Russia) Polina Kozyreva (Belgium) Eliessa Vanlangendonck
October 29	Antalya, Turkey; Hard $15,000; Singles and doubles draws	(Poland) Marta Leśniak; 6–1, 6–1	(Germany) Franziska Sziedat	(Russia) Polina Golubovskaya (Romania) Ioana Gașpar	(Turkey) Zeynep Sönmez (Turkey) İpek Öz (Turkey) Cemre Anıl (Italy) Nuria Brancaccio
October 29	Antalya, Turkey; Hard $15,000; Singles and doubles draws	(Romania) Ioana Gașpar (Romania) Gabriela Nicole Tătăruș; 6–7^{(3–7)}, 7–5, [10–4]	(Turkey) İpek Öz (Turkey) Melis Sezer	(Russia) Polina Golubovskaya (Romania) Ioana Gașpar	(Turkey) Zeynep Sönmez (Turkey) İpek Öz (Turkey) Cemre Anıl (Italy) Nuria Brancaccio

=== November ===
Week of	Tournament	Winner	Runners-up	Semifinalists	Quarterfinalists
November 5	Shenzhen Longhua Open; Shenzhen, China; Hard $100,000; Singles – Doubles	(Serbia) Ivana Jorović; 6–3, 2–6, 6–4	(China) Zheng Saisai	(Japan) Misaki Doi (Montenegro) Danka Kovinić	(Greece) Valentini Grammatikopoulou (Thailand) Luksika Kumkhum (Canada) Carol Zhao (China) Wang Yafan
November 5	Shenzhen Longhua Open; Shenzhen, China; Hard $100,000; Singles – Doubles	(Japan) Shuko Aoyama (China) Yang Zhaoxuan; 6–2, 6–3	(South Korea) Choi Ji-hee (Thailand) Luksika Kumkhum	(Japan) Misaki Doi (Montenegro) Danka Kovinić	(Greece) Valentini Grammatikopoulou (Thailand) Luksika Kumkhum (Canada) Carol Zhao (China) Wang Yafan
November 5	Red Rock Pro Open; Las Vegas, United States; Hard $80,000; Singles – Doubles	(Switzerland) Belinda Bencic; 7–5, 6–1	(United States) Nicole Gibbs	(Japan) Kurumi Nara (Mexico) Giuliana Olmos	(Czech Republic) Marie Bouzková (Paraguay) Verónica Cepede Royg (Hungary) Fanny Stollár (United States) Danielle Lao
November 5	Red Rock Pro Open; Las Vegas, United States; Hard $80,000; Singles – Doubles	(United States) Asia Muhammad (United States) Maria Sanchez; 6–3, 6–4	(United States) Sophie Chang (United States) Alexandra Mueller	(Japan) Kurumi Nara (Mexico) Giuliana Olmos	(Czech Republic) Marie Bouzková (Paraguay) Verónica Cepede Royg (Hungary) Fanny Stollár (United States) Danielle Lao
November 5	Copa LP Chile Hacienda Chicureo; Colina, Chile; Clay $60,000; Singles – Doubles	(China) Xu Shilin; 7–5, 6–3	(Argentina) Paula Ormaechea	(Chile) Bárbara Gatica (Brazil) Luisa Stefani	(Germany) Katharina Hobgarski (Chile) Fernanda Brito (Hungary) Panna Udvardy (Chile) Alexa Guarachi
November 5	Copa LP Chile Hacienda Chicureo; Colina, Chile; Clay $60,000; Singles – Doubles	(United States) Quinn Gleason (Brazil) Luisa Stefani; 6–0, 4–6, [10–7]	(Chile) Bárbara Gatica (Brazil) Rebeca Pereira	(Chile) Bárbara Gatica (Brazil) Luisa Stefani	(Germany) Katharina Hobgarski (Chile) Fernanda Brito (Hungary) Panna Udvardy (Chile) Alexa Guarachi
November 5	Minsk, Belarus; Hard (indoor) $25,000; Singles and doubles draws	(Belarus) Yuliya Hatouka; 7–5, 7–5	(Romania) Raluca Șerban	(Poland) Katarzyna Piter (Russia) Polina Monova	(Switzerland) Susan Bandecchi (Turkey) Berfu Cengiz (Poland) Katarzyna Kawa (Georgia (country)) Mariam Bolkvadze
November 5	Minsk, Belarus; Hard (indoor) $25,000; Singles and doubles draws	(Belarus) Ilona Kremen (Belarus) Iryna Shymanovich; 6–3, 7–6^{(7–3)}	(Russia) Polina Monova (Russia) Yana Sizikova	(Poland) Katarzyna Piter (Russia) Polina Monova	(Switzerland) Susan Bandecchi (Turkey) Berfu Cengiz (Poland) Katarzyna Kawa (Georgia (country)) Mariam Bolkvadze
November 5	GB Pro-Series Shrewsbury; Shrewsbury, United Kingdom; Hard (indoor) $25,000; Singles and doubles draws	(United Kingdom) Maia Lumsden; 6–1, 4–6, 6–3	(Russia) Valeria Savinykh	(Belgium) Greet Minnen (Turkey) Pemra Özgen	(Netherlands) Arantxa Rus (Austria) Barbara Haas (Spain) Guiomar Maristany (Romania) Laura-Ioana Andrei
November 5	GB Pro-Series Shrewsbury; Shrewsbury, United Kingdom; Hard (indoor) $25,000; Singles and doubles draws	(United Kingdom) Sarah Beth Grey (United Kingdom) Olivia Nicholls; 0–6, 6–3, [10–4]	(Germany) Tayisiya Morderger (Germany) Yana Morderger	(Belgium) Greet Minnen (Turkey) Pemra Özgen	(Netherlands) Arantxa Rus (Austria) Barbara Haas (Spain) Guiomar Maristany (Romania) Laura-Ioana Andrei
November 5	Lawrence, United States; Hard (indoor) $25,000; Singles and doubles draws	(United States) Caty McNally; 6–2, 6–2	(United States) Catherine Harrison	(Germany) Romy Kölzer (United States) Ena Shibahara	(Canada) Bianca Andreescu (United States) Emma Navarro (United States) Katie Volynets (Chinese Taipei) Hsu Chieh-yu
November 5	Lawrence, United States; Hard (indoor) $25,000; Singles and doubles draws	(Montenegro) Vladica Babić (United States) Ena Shibahara; 6–4, 6–2	(Kazakhstan) Anna Danilina (Russia) Ksenia Laskutova	(Germany) Romy Kölzer (United States) Ena Shibahara	(Canada) Bianca Andreescu (United States) Emma Navarro (United States) Katie Volynets (Chinese Taipei) Hsu Chieh-yu
November 5	Cúcuta, Colombia; Clay $15,000; Singles and doubles draws	(Colombia) Camila Osorio; 6–3, 7–6^{(7–2)}	(Colombia) Yuliana Lizarazo	(Colombia) Jessica Plazas (Colombia) María Paulina Pérez	(United States) Shelby Talcott (Canada) Raphaëlle Lacasse (United States) Audrey Ann Blakely (United States) Nikita Uberoi
November 5	Cúcuta, Colombia; Clay $15,000; Singles and doubles draws	(Colombia) María Paulina Pérez (Colombia) Paula Andrea Pérez; 6–1, 6–1	(Colombia) Ana María Becerra (Colombia) Daniela Carrillo	(Colombia) Jessica Plazas (Colombia) María Paulina Pérez	(United States) Shelby Talcott (Canada) Raphaëlle Lacasse (United States) Audrey Ann Blakely (United States) Nikita Uberoi
November 5	Sharm El Sheikh, Egypt; Hard $15,000; Singles and doubles draws	(Ukraine) Anastasiya Shoshyna; 7–5, 7–5	(Russia) Anna Morgina	(Egypt) Sandra Samir (Moldova) Anastasia Vdovenco	(Bosnia and Herzegovina) Jelena Simić (Belgium) Victoria Kalaitzis (United Kingdom) Aleksandra Pitak (United Kingdom) Katarzyna Pitak
November 5	Sharm El Sheikh, Egypt; Hard $15,000; Singles and doubles draws	(Russia) Anna Morgina (Ukraine) Anastasiya Shoshyna; 3–6, 6–3, [10–5]	(Romania) Elena-Teodora Cadar (Bosnia and Herzegovina) Jelena Simić	(Egypt) Sandra Samir (Moldova) Anastasia Vdovenco	(Bosnia and Herzegovina) Jelena Simić (Belgium) Victoria Kalaitzis (United Kingdom) Aleksandra Pitak (United Kingdom) Katarzyna Pitak
November 5	Heraklion, Greece; Clay $15,000; Singles and doubles draws	(Russia) Anna Ureke; 6–2, 1–6, 6–2	(Russia) Darya Astakhova	(Switzerland) Xenia Knoll (Israel) Maya Tahan	(Russia) Elina Nepliy (Romania) Oana Gavrilă (Austria) Mira Antonitsch (Belgium) Michaela Boev
November 5	Heraklion, Greece; Clay $15,000; Singles and doubles draws	(Greece) Anna Arkadianou (Russia) Elina Nepliy; 6–3, 7–6^{(7–3)}	(Austria) Mira Antonitsch (Germany) Sarah Nikocevic	(Switzerland) Xenia Knoll (Israel) Maya Tahan	(Russia) Elina Nepliy (Romania) Oana Gavrilă (Austria) Mira Antonitsch (Belgium) Michaela Boev
November 5	Cordenons, Italy; Clay (indoor) $15,000; Singles and doubles draws	(Italy) Anastasia Grymalska; 6–1, 6–2	(Italy) Anastasia Piangerelli	(Germany) Anne Schäfer (Slovenia) Nika Radišič	(Germany) Laura Schaeder (Italy) Verena Hofer (Italy) Camilla Scala (Italy) Isabella Tcherkes Zade
November 5	Cordenons, Italy; Clay (indoor) $15,000; Singles and doubles draws	(Italy) Lucia Bronzetti (Italy) Anastasia Grymalska; 7–5, 7–5	(Italy) Veren Hofer (Italy) Maria Vittoria Viviani	(Germany) Anne Schäfer (Slovenia) Nika Radišič	(Germany) Laura Schaeder (Italy) Verena Hofer (Italy) Camilla Scala (Italy) Isabella Tcherkes Zade
November 5	Vinaròs, Spain; Clay $15,000; Singles and doubles draws	(Russia) Alina Charaeva; 6–1, 6–2	(Spain) Júlia Payola	(Spain) Gemma Lairón Navarro (Spain) Paula Arias Manjón	(Romania) Ioana Loredana Roșca (Germany) Julyette Steur (United Kingdom) Amanda Carreras (Malta) Helene Pellicano
November 5	Vinaròs, Spain; Clay $15,000; Singles and doubles draws	(Spain) Gemma Lairón Navarro (Spain) Rosa Vicens Mas; 7–6^{(9–7)}, 6–3	(Spain) Noelia Bouzó Zanotti (Romania) Ioana Loredana Roșca	(Spain) Gemma Lairón Navarro (Spain) Paula Arias Manjón	(Romania) Ioana Loredana Roșca (Germany) Julyette Steur (United Kingdom) Amanda Carreras (Malta) Helene Pellicano
November 5	Nonthaburi, Thailand; Hard $15,000; Singles and doubles draws	(Chinese Taipei) Lee Hua-chen; 6–4, 6–1	(Thailand) Anchisa Chanta	(Thailand) Bunyawi Thamchaiwat (Japan) Mana Ayukawa	(India) Zeel Desai (Netherlands) Suzan Lamens (Hong Kong) Maggie Ng (Chinese Taipei) Joanna Garland
November 5	Nonthaburi, Thailand; Hard $15,000; Singles and doubles draws	(Thailand) Chompoothip Jundakate (Thailand) Tamachan Momkoonthod; 6–3, 6–4	(Netherlands) Suzan Lamens (Switzerland) Nina Stadler	(Thailand) Bunyawi Thamchaiwat (Japan) Mana Ayukawa	(India) Zeel Desai (Netherlands) Suzan Lamens (Hong Kong) Maggie Ng (Chinese Taipei) Joanna Garland
November 5	Monastir, Tunisia; Hard $15,000; Singles and doubles draws	(Sweden) Jacqueline Cabaj Awad; 5–7, 6–3, 6–4	(United States) Sarah Lee	(Italy) Miriana Tona (Serbia) Tamara Čurović	(Spain) Nora Ayala Serra (Belgium) Eliessa Vanlangendonck (Serbia) Bojana Marinković (Croatia) Adriana Rajković
November 5	Monastir, Tunisia; Hard $15,000; Singles and doubles draws	(Finland) Mia Eklund (Serbia) Bojana Marinković; 6–1, 7–6^{(10–8)}	(Serbia) Tamara Čurović (Belgium) Eliessa Vanlangendonck	(Italy) Miriana Tona (Serbia) Tamara Čurović	(Spain) Nora Ayala Serra (Belgium) Eliessa Vanlangendonck (Serbia) Bojana Marinković (Croatia) Adriana Rajković
November 5	Antalya, Turkey; Hard $15,000; Singles and doubles draws	(Ukraine) Daria Snigur; 3–6, 7–6^{(7–3)}, 6–3	(Turkey) Zeynep Sönmez	(Hungary) Ágnes Bukta (Turkey) İlay Yörük	(Turkey) Melis Sezer (Poland) Marta Leśniak (Turkey) İpek Öz (Bulgaria) Dia Evtimova
November 5	Antalya, Turkey; Hard $15,000; Singles and doubles draws	(Hungary) Ágnes Bukta (Bulgaria) Dia Evtimova; 6–3, 3–6, [11–9]	(Russia) Veronika Pepelyaeva (Russia) Anastasia Tikhonova	(Hungary) Ágnes Bukta (Turkey) İlay Yörük	(Turkey) Melis Sezer (Poland) Marta Leśniak (Turkey) İpek Öz (Bulgaria) Dia Evtimova
November 12	Muzaffarnagar, India; Grass $25,000; Singles and doubles draws	(Serbia) Natalija Kostić; 6–2, 3–1, ret.	(Slovakia) Tereza Mihalíková	(Japan) Hiroko Kuwata (Slovenia) Nastja Kolar	(Indonesia) Aldila Sutjiadi (Germany) Sarah-Rebecca Sekulic (Bulgaria) Aleksandrina Naydenova (Japan) Kyōka Okamura
November 12	Muzaffarnagar, India; Grass $25,000; Singles and doubles draws	(Indonesia) Aldila Sutjiadi (China) Wang Danni; 7–6^{(8–6)}, 7–5	(Japan) Kyōka Okamura (Japan) Michika Ozeki	(Japan) Hiroko Kuwata (Slovenia) Nastja Kolar	(Indonesia) Aldila Sutjiadi (Germany) Sarah-Rebecca Sekulic (Bulgaria) Aleksandrina Naydenova (Japan) Kyōka Okamura
November 12	Norman, United States; Hard $25,000; Singles and doubles draws	(Canada) Bianca Andreescu; 6–1, 6–0	(Colombia) Camila Osorio	(Japan) Yuriko Lily Miyazaki (United States) Katie Volynets	(United States) Jessica Ho (United States) Lorraine Guillermo (Japan) Miharu Imanishi (Japan) Mai Hontama
November 12	Norman, United States; Hard $25,000; Singles and doubles draws	(Montenegro) Vladica Babić (United States) Ena Shibahara; 6–2, 6–3	(Mexico) María José Portillo Ramírez (United States) Sofia Sewing	(Japan) Yuriko Lily Miyazaki (United States) Katie Volynets	(United States) Jessica Ho (United States) Lorraine Guillermo (Japan) Miharu Imanishi (Japan) Mai Hontama
November 12	Villa del Dique, Argentina; Clay $15,000; Singles and doubles draws	(Chile) Fernanda Brito; 6–3, 6–3	(Argentina) Carla Lucero	(Chile) Eugenia Ganga (Argentina) Melina Ferrero	(Argentina) Julia Riera (Argentina) Jazmín Ortenzi (Argentina) Julieta Lara Estable (Chile) Bárbara Gatica
November 12	Villa del Dique, Argentina; Clay $15,000; Singles and doubles draws	(Chile) Bárbara Gatica (Brazil) Rebeca Pereira; 6–3, 6–3	(Chile) Fernanda Brito (Argentina) Carla Lucero	(Chile) Eugenia Ganga (Argentina) Melina Ferrero	(Argentina) Julia Riera (Argentina) Jazmín Ortenzi (Argentina) Julieta Lara Estable (Chile) Bárbara Gatica
November 12	Sharm El Sheikh, Egypt; Hard $15,000; Singles and doubles draws	(Russia) Anastasia Pribylova; 4–6, 7–5, 6–2	(Slovakia) Barbora Matúšová	(Switzerland) Susan Bandecchi (Ukraine) Anastasiya Shoshyna	(Bosnia and Herzegovina) Jelena Simić (Egypt) Ola Abou Zekry (United Kingdom) Aleksandra Pitak (Egypt) Sandra Samir
November 12	Sharm El Sheikh, Egypt; Hard $15,000; Singles and doubles draws	(Poland) Weronika Falkowska (Poland) Daria Kuczer; 6–3, 3–6, [10–5]	(Russia) Anastasia Pribylova (Russia) Anna Pribylova	(Switzerland) Susan Bandecchi (Ukraine) Anastasiya Shoshyna	(Bosnia and Herzegovina) Jelena Simić (Egypt) Ola Abou Zekry (United Kingdom) Aleksandra Pitak (Egypt) Sandra Samir
November 12	Heraklion, Greece; Clay $15,000; Singles and doubles draws	(Croatia) Oleksandra Oliynykova; 7–6^{(7–3)}, 7–6^{(7–4)}	(Poland) Anna Hertel	(Russia) Anna Ureke (Russia) Anna Ukolova	(Serbia) Tamara Malešević (United States) Haley Giavara (Austria) Mira Antonitsch (United States) Kimmy Guerin
November 12	Heraklion, Greece; Clay $15,000; Singles and doubles draws	(Russia) Anna Iakovleva (Bulgaria) Ani Vangelova; Walkover	(United States) Mary Closs (United States) Kimmy Guerin	(Russia) Anna Ureke (Russia) Anna Ukolova	(Serbia) Tamara Malešević (United States) Haley Giavara (Austria) Mira Antonitsch (United States) Kimmy Guerin
November 12	Castellón, Spain; Clay $15,000; Singles and doubles draws	Singles and doubles competition cancelled due to bad weather		(Spain) Marina Bassols Ribera (Spain) Claudia Hoste Ferrer (Spain) Rebeka Masarova (Spain) Andrea Lázaro García	(Spain) Rosa Vicens Mas (Spain) Alba Carrillo Marín (Italy) Michele Alexandra Zmău (Italy) Martina Spigarelli
November 12	Castellón, Spain; Clay $15,000; Singles and doubles draws	(Spain) Noelia Bouzó Zanotti / (Bolivia) Noelia Zeballos vs (Spain) Claudia Hoste Ferrer / (Italy) Michele Alexandra Zmău		(Spain) Marina Bassols Ribera (Spain) Claudia Hoste Ferrer (Spain) Rebeka Masarova (Spain) Andrea Lázaro García	(Spain) Rosa Vicens Mas (Spain) Alba Carrillo Marín (Italy) Michele Alexandra Zmău (Italy) Martina Spigarelli
November 12	Nonthaburi, Thailand; Hard $15,000; Singles and doubles draws	(Thailand) Nudnida Luangnam; 7–6^{(7–3)}, 2–6, 6–2	(Japan) Misaki Matsuda	(Thailand) Watsachol Sawatdee (Thailand) Anchisa Chanta	(Thailand) Punnin Kovapitukted (Kazakhstan) Zhibek Kulambayeva (Switzerland) Nina Stadler (South Korea) Lee Eun-hye
November 12	Nonthaburi, Thailand; Hard $15,000; Singles and doubles draws	(Thailand) Nudnida Luangnam (Thailand) Varunya Wongteanchai; 2–6, 6–4, [10–7]	(Thailand) Bunyawi Thamchaiwat (Japan) Ramu Ueda	(Thailand) Watsachol Sawatdee (Thailand) Anchisa Chanta	(Thailand) Punnin Kovapitukted (Kazakhstan) Zhibek Kulambayeva (Switzerland) Nina Stadler (South Korea) Lee Eun-hye
November 12	Monastir, Tunisia; Hard $15,000; Singles and doubles draws	(Romania) Ilona Georgiana Ghioroaie; 7–6^{(7–3)}, 6–1	(Sweden) Linnéa Malmqvist	(Slovakia) Timea Jarušková (India) Bhuvana Kalva	(United States) Chiara Scholl (Italy) Melania Delai (Serbia) Tamara Čurović (Sweden) Louise Brunskog
November 12	Monastir, Tunisia; Hard $15,000; Singles and doubles draws	(Serbia) Tamara Čurović (Netherlands) Dominique Karregat; 7–6^{(8–6)}, 6–1	(Finland) Mia Eklund (Sweden) Linnéa Malmqvist	(Slovakia) Timea Jarušková (India) Bhuvana Kalva	(United States) Chiara Scholl (Italy) Melania Delai (Serbia) Tamara Čurović (Sweden) Louise Brunskog
November 12	Antalya, Turkey; Clay $15,000; Singles and doubles draws	(Japan) Naho Sato; 3–6, 6–4, 7–6^{(7–3)}	(Romania) Oana Georgeta Simion	(France) Carole Monnet (Russia) Kamilla Rakhimova	(Russia) Sofia Dmitrieva (Turkey) Zeynep Sera Sarıoğlan (Romania) Ioana Gașpar (Bulgaria) Julia Stamatova
November 12	Antalya, Turkey; Clay $15,000; Singles and doubles draws	(Germany) Lisa Ponomar (Japan) Naho Sato; 6–4, 6–2	(Romania) Ioana Gașpar (Romania) Oana Georgeta Simion	(France) Carole Monnet (Russia) Kamilla Rakhimova	(Russia) Sofia Dmitrieva (Turkey) Zeynep Sera Sarıoğlan (Romania) Ioana Gașpar (Bulgaria) Julia Stamatova
November 19	Sharm El Sheikh, Egypt; Hard $15,000; Singles and doubles draws	(Romania) Arina Gabriela Vasilescu; 6–1, 6–4	(Russia) Anna Pribylova	(Russia) Anastasia Pribylova (Poland) Daria Kuczer	(Slovenia) Nastja Kolar (Poland) Weronika Falkowska (Switzerland) Jenny Dürst (Switzerland) Susan Bandecchi
November 19	Sharm El Sheikh, Egypt; Hard $15,000; Singles and doubles draws	(Switzerland) Jenny Dürst (Switzerland) Fiona Ganz; Walkover	(Poland) Weronika Falkowska (Poland) Daria Kuczer	(Russia) Anastasia Pribylova (Poland) Daria Kuczer	(Slovenia) Nastja Kolar (Poland) Weronika Falkowska (Switzerland) Jenny Dürst (Switzerland) Susan Bandecchi
November 19	Solarino, Italy; Carpet $15,000; Singles and doubles draws	(United Kingdom) Amanda Carreras; 6–4, 3–6, 7–5	(Argentina) Catalina Pella	(Italy) Miriana Tona (Italy) Verena Hofer	(Greece) Sapfo Sakellaridi (Italy) Costanza Traversi (Slovenia) Manca Pislak (Italy) Alessia Truden
November 19	Solarino, Italy; Carpet $15,000; Singles and doubles draws	(Argentina) Catalina Pella (Italy) Miriana Tona; 6–4, 6–2	(Russia) Ekaterina Reyngold (Russia) Iuliia Sokolovskaia	(Italy) Miriana Tona (Italy) Verena Hofer	(Greece) Sapfo Sakellaridi (Italy) Costanza Traversi (Slovenia) Manca Pislak (Italy) Alessia Truden
November 19	Stellenbosch, South Africa; Hard $15,000; Singles and doubles draws	(Russia) Ekaterina Makarova; 6–4, 6–4	(Russia) Anastasia Shaulskaya	(Israel) Maya Tahan (Austria) Lisa-Maria Moser	(South Africa) Megan Basson (Israel) Shahar Biran (Netherlands) Gabriella Mujan (Netherlands) Dewi Dijkman
November 19	Stellenbosch, South Africa; Hard $15,000; Singles and doubles draws	(Israel) Maya Tahan (Netherlands) Eva Vedder; 6–3, 6–0	(United States) Stephanie Kent (Russia) Anastasia Shaulskaya	(Israel) Maya Tahan (Austria) Lisa-Maria Moser	(South Africa) Megan Basson (Israel) Shahar Biran (Netherlands) Gabriella Mujan (Netherlands) Dewi Dijkman
November 19	Nules, Spain; Clay $15,000; Singles and doubles draws	(Italy) Elisabetta Cocciaretto; 6–2, 7–6^{(7–2)}	(Spain) Cristina Bucșa	(Italy) Michele Alexandra Zmău (Spain) Marina Bassols Ribera	(Spain) Alicia Herrero Liñana (Spain) Paula Arias Manjón (Spain) Claudia Hoste Ferrer (Spain) Júlia Payola
November 19	Nules, Spain; Clay $15,000; Singles and doubles draws	(Spain) Cristina Bucșa (Spain) Claudia Hoste Ferrer; 7–6^{(7–3)}, 6–3	(Spain) Marina Bassols Ribera (Spain) Júlia Payola	(Italy) Michele Alexandra Zmău (Spain) Marina Bassols Ribera	(Spain) Alicia Herrero Liñana (Spain) Paula Arias Manjón (Spain) Claudia Hoste Ferrer (Spain) Júlia Payola
November 19	Monastir, Tunisia; Hard $15,000; Singles and doubles draws	(Romania) Ilona Georgiana Ghioroaie; 6–1, 6–3	(United States) Chiara Scholl	(Croatia) Silvia Njirić (France) Irys Ekani	(Finland) Mia Eklund (Russia) Natalia Orlova (Japan) Chinatsu Shimizu (Australia) Jelena Stojanovic
November 19	Monastir, Tunisia; Hard $15,000; Singles and doubles draws	(Switzerland) Chiara Grimm (United States) Chiara Scholl; 6–2, 6–1	(France) Irys Ekani (France) Kélia Le Bihan	(Croatia) Silvia Njirić (France) Irys Ekani	(Finland) Mia Eklund (Russia) Natalia Orlova (Japan) Chinatsu Shimizu (Australia) Jelena Stojanovic
November 19	Antalya, Turkey; Hard $15,000; Singles and doubles draws	(Turkey) Ayla Aksu; 7–5, 6–1	(Guatemala) Kirsten-Andrea Weedon	(Switzerland) Bojana Klincov (Switzerland) Nadine Keller	(Turkey) İlay Yörük (Bosnia and Herzegovina) Anita Husarić (Romania) Andreea Prisăcariu (Romania) Ioana Gașpar
November 19	Antalya, Turkey; Hard $15,000; Singles and doubles draws	(Romania) Georgia Crăciun (Romania) Oana Georgeta Simion; 6–1, 6–3	(Romania) Ioana Gașpar (Romania) Andreea Prisăcariu	(Switzerland) Bojana Klincov (Switzerland) Nadine Keller	(Turkey) İlay Yörük (Bosnia and Herzegovina) Anita Husarić (Romania) Andreea Prisăcariu (Romania) Ioana Gașpar
November 26	Pune, India; Hard $25,000; Singles and doubles draws	(Slovenia) Tamara Zidanšek; 6–3, 6–4	(India) Karman Thandi	(Spain) Eva Guerrero Álvarez (India) Ankita Raina	(Russia) Marina Melnikova (Romania) Jaqueline Cristian (Ukraine) Valeriya Strakhova (China) Zhang Kailin
November 26	Pune, India; Hard $25,000; Singles and doubles draws	(India) Ankita Raina (India) Karman Thandi; 6–2, 6–7^{(5–7)}, [11–9]	(Bulgaria) Aleksandrina Naydenova (Slovenia) Tamara Zidanšek	(Spain) Eva Guerrero Álvarez (India) Ankita Raina	(Russia) Marina Melnikova (Romania) Jaqueline Cristian (Ukraine) Valeriya Strakhova (China) Zhang Kailin
November 26	Milovice, Czech Republic; Hard (indoor) $15,000; Singles and doubles draws	(Belgium) Lara Salden; 4–6, 6–4, 7–5	(Bosnia and Herzegovina) Nefisa Berberović	(Czech Republic) Denisa Hindová (Russia) Daria Kruzhkova	(Czech Republic) Miriam Kolodziejová (Germany) Natalie Pröse (Czech Republic) Veronika Vlkovská (Latvia) Daniela Vismane
November 26	Milovice, Czech Republic; Hard (indoor) $15,000; Singles and doubles draws	(Russia) Daria Kruzhkova (Belgium) Lara Salden; 6–0, 6–2	(Czech Republic) Dagmar Dudláková (Poland) Joanna Zawadzka	(Czech Republic) Denisa Hindová (Russia) Daria Kruzhkova	(Czech Republic) Miriam Kolodziejová (Germany) Natalie Pröse (Czech Republic) Veronika Vlkovská (Latvia) Daniela Vismane
November 26	Cairo, Egypt; Hard $15,000; Singles and doubles draws	(Egypt) Sandra Samir; 6–2, 3–6, 6–3	(Italy) Michele Alexandra Zmău	(Slovenia) Nika Radišič (Switzerland) Joanne Züger	(Egypt) Lamis Alhussein Abdel Aziz (Spain) Ana Lantigua de la Nuez (Russia) Viktoriia Kalinina (Romania) Cristina Ene
November 26	Cairo, Egypt; Hard $15,000; Singles and doubles draws	(Slovenia) Nika Radišič (Switzerland) Joanne Züger; 6–3, 6–3	(Romania) Cristina Ene (Italy) Michele Alexandra Zmău	(Slovenia) Nika Radišič (Switzerland) Joanne Züger	(Egypt) Lamis Alhussein Abdel Aziz (Spain) Ana Lantigua de la Nuez (Russia) Viktoriia Kalinina (Romania) Cristina Ene
November 26	Solarino, Italy; Carpet $15,000; Singles and doubles draws	(Argentina) Catalina Pella; 6–1, 6–2	(Italy) Federica Bilardo	(Switzerland) Sandy Marti (France) Lou Adler	(Slovenia) Manca Pislak (Italy) Sara Gambogi (Switzerland) Xenia Knoll (Italy) Miriana Tona
November 26	Solarino, Italy; Carpet $15,000; Singles and doubles draws	(France) Lou Adler (Bolivia) Noelia Zeballos; 2–6, 6–4, [10–6]	(Italy) Maria Masini (Slovenia) Manca Pislak	(Switzerland) Sandy Marti (France) Lou Adler	(Slovenia) Manca Pislak (Italy) Sara Gambogi (Switzerland) Xenia Knoll (Italy) Miriana Tona
November 26	Stellenbosch, South Africa; Hard $15,000; Singles and doubles draws	(Russia) Ekaterina Makarova; 6–2, 6–2	(United Kingdom) Alice Gillan	(Israel) Shahar Biran (United States) Amy Zhu	(United Kingdom) Emilie Lindh (Germany) Katharina Hering (Russia) Anastasia Shaulskaya (Austria) Lisa-Maria Moser
November 26	Stellenbosch, South Africa; Hard $15,000; Singles and doubles draws	(Israel) Maya Tahan (Netherlands) Eva Vedder; 6–0, 6–4	(Russia) Ekaterina Makarova (South Africa) Sari Stegmann	(Israel) Shahar Biran (United States) Amy Zhu	(United Kingdom) Emilie Lindh (Germany) Katharina Hering (Russia) Anastasia Shaulskaya (Austria) Lisa-Maria Moser
November 26	Hua Hin, Thailand; Hard $15,000; Singles and doubles draws	(Thailand) Nudnida Luangnam; 6–1, 3–6, 6–3	(Indonesia) Aldila Sutjiadi	(Thailand) Mananchaya Sawangkaew (China) Guo Shanshan	(Thailand) Bunyawi Thamchaiwat (Thailand) Tamachan Momkoonthod (Russia) Mariya Krasakova (Japan) Haine Ogata
November 26	Hua Hin, Thailand; Hard $15,000; Singles and doubles draws	(Thailand) Nudnida Luangnam (Thailand) Bunyawi Thamchaiwat; 6–4, 6–2	(Japan) Ayaka Okuno (Indonesia) Aldila Sutjiadi	(Thailand) Mananchaya Sawangkaew (China) Guo Shanshan	(Thailand) Bunyawi Thamchaiwat (Thailand) Tamachan Momkoonthod (Russia) Mariya Krasakova (Japan) Haine Ogata
November 26	Monastir, Tunisia; Hard $15,000; Singles and doubles draws	(Switzerland) Leonie Küng; 6–2, 6–1	(United States) Chiara Scholl	(Italy) Claudia Giovine (Russia) Daria Lodikova	(Russia) Maria Titova (Italy) Angelica Raggi (France) Kélia Le Bihan (Australia) Jelena Stojanovic
November 26	Monastir, Tunisia; Hard $15,000; Singles and doubles draws	(Serbia) Tamara Čurović (Croatia) Silvia Njirić; 7–6^{(7–2)}, 4–6, [10–6]	(Switzerland) Nicole Gadient (United States) Chiara Scholl	(Italy) Claudia Giovine (Russia) Daria Lodikova	(Russia) Maria Titova (Italy) Angelica Raggi (France) Kélia Le Bihan (Australia) Jelena Stojanovic
November 26	Antalya, Turkey; Hard $15,000; Singles and doubles draws	(Ukraine) Daria Snigur vs (Finland) Oona Orpana Singles and doubles competition cancelled due to bad weather		(Romania) Georgia Crăciun (Romania) Ioana Gașpar	(Guatemala) Kirsten-Andrea Weedon (Russia) Aleksandra Pospelova (Belarus) Katyarina Paulenka (Bulgaria) Dia Evtimova

=== December ===
Week of	Tournament	Winner	Runners-up	Semifinalists	Quarterfinalists
December 3	Solapur, India; Hard $25,000; Singles and doubles draws	(Russia) Marina Melnikova; 6–1, 6–2	(China) Lu Jiajing	(India) Rutuja Bhosale (Netherlands) Quirine Lemoine	(Slovenia) Tamara Zidanšek (Israel) Deniz Khazaniuk (Poland) Katarzyna Piter (China) Zhang Kailin
December 3	Solapur, India; Hard $25,000; Singles and doubles draws	(Japan) Miyabi Inoue (China) Lu Jiajing; 6–3, 6–3	(United Kingdom) Sarah Beth Grey (Russia) Ekaterina Yashina	(India) Rutuja Bhosale (Netherlands) Quirine Lemoine	(Slovenia) Tamara Zidanšek (Israel) Deniz Khazaniuk (Poland) Katarzyna Piter (China) Zhang Kailin
December 3	Bogotá, Colombia; Clay $15,000; Singles and doubles draws	(United States) Allura Zamarripa; 6–3, 6–3	(Mexico) Andrea Renée Villarreal	(Colombia) María Paulina Pérez (Colombia) María Juliana Parra Romero	(Colombia) Mariana Carvajal (Colombia) Daniela Carrillo (United States) Rushri Wijesundera (Colombia) Gabriela Giraldo
December 3	Bogotá, Colombia; Clay $15,000; Singles and doubles draws	(United States) Allura Zamarripa (United States) Maribella Zamarripa; 7–5, 6–4	(Colombia) María Paulina Pérez (Colombia) Paula Andrea Pérez	(Colombia) María Paulina Pérez (Colombia) María Juliana Parra Romero	(Colombia) Mariana Carvajal (Colombia) Daniela Carrillo (United States) Rushri Wijesundera (Colombia) Gabriela Giraldo
December 3	Jablonec nad Nisou, Czech Republic; Hard (indoor) $15,000; Singles and doubles draws	(Belgium) Lara Salden; 6–3, 3–6, 6–4	(Czech Republic) Magdaléna Pantůčková	(Slovakia) Timea Jarušková (Czech Republic) Karolína Beránková	(Poland) Joanna Zawadzka (Latvia) Daniela Vismane (Bosnia and Herzegovina) Nefisa Berberović (Czech Republic) Barbora Miklová
December 3	Jablonec nad Nisou, Czech Republic; Hard (indoor) $15,000; Singles and doubles draws	(Czech Republic) Karolína Beránková (Czech Republic) Barbora Miklová; 7–5, 6–4	(Czech Republic) Karolína Kubáňová (Czech Republic) Nikola Tomanová	(Slovakia) Timea Jarušková (Czech Republic) Karolína Beránková	(Poland) Joanna Zawadzka (Latvia) Daniela Vismane (Bosnia and Herzegovina) Nefisa Berberović (Czech Republic) Barbora Miklová
December 3	Cairo, Egypt; Clay $15,000; Singles and doubles draws	(Ukraine) Viktoriia Dema; 6–2, 7–5	(Romania) Cristina Ene	(Hungary) Vanda Lukács (Ukraine) Anastasiya Shoshyna	(Egypt) Sandra Samir (Germany) Julyette Steur (Ecuador) Charlotte Römer (Romania) Gabriela Nicole Tătăruș
December 3	Cairo, Egypt; Clay $15,000; Singles and doubles draws	(Japan) Minami Akiyama (Ukraine) Viktoriia Dema; 6–2, 6–7^{(2–7)}, [10–6]	(Egypt) Sandra Samir (Ukraine) Anastasiya Shoshyna	(Hungary) Vanda Lukács (Ukraine) Anastasiya Shoshyna	(Egypt) Sandra Samir (Germany) Julyette Steur (Ecuador) Charlotte Römer (Romania) Gabriela Nicole Tătăruș
December 3	Solarino, Italy; Carpet $15,000; Singles and doubles draws	(France) Lou Adler; 6–3, 6–4	(Argentina) Catalina Pella	(Guatemala) Kirsten-Andrea Weedon (Greece) Eleni Daniilidou	(Spain) Júlia Payola (Switzerland) Sandy Marti (Italy) Maria Masini (Italy) Miriana Tona
December 3	Solarino, Italy; Carpet $15,000; Singles and doubles draws	(Argentina) Catalina Pella (Italy) Miriana Tona; 7–5, 6–3	(Slovenia) Veronika Erjavec (Slovenia) Kristina Novak	(Guatemala) Kirsten-Andrea Weedon (Greece) Eleni Daniilidou	(Spain) Júlia Payola (Switzerland) Sandy Marti (Italy) Maria Masini (Italy) Miriana Tona
December 3	Stellenbosch, South Africa; Hard $15,000; Singles and doubles draws	(Russia) Ekaterina Makarova; 6–4, 6–4	(United Kingdom) Alice Gillan	(United Kingdom) Emilie Lindh (Germany) Katharina Hering	(Netherlands) Eva Vedder (United States) Madison Westby (Russia) Anastasia Shaulskaya (United States) Amy Zhu
December 3	Stellenbosch, South Africa; Hard $15,000; Singles and doubles draws	(United States) Madison Westby (United States) Amy Zhu; 6–4, 6–2	(Germany) Patricia Böntgen (Germany) Katharina Hering	(United Kingdom) Emilie Lindh (Germany) Katharina Hering	(Netherlands) Eva Vedder (United States) Madison Westby (Russia) Anastasia Shaulskaya (United States) Amy Zhu
December 3	Hua Hin, Thailand; Hard $15,000; Singles and doubles draws	(Thailand) Nudnida Luangnam; 6–3, 1–6, 6–1	(Indonesia) Aldila Sutjiadi	(Thailand) Bunyawi Thamchaiwat (Denmark) Olga Helmi	(Thailand) Tamachan Momkoonthod (China) Sun Ziyue (Chinese Taipei) Cho Yi-tsen (Japan) Sakura Hosogi
December 3	Hua Hin, Thailand; Hard $15,000; Singles and doubles draws	(Indonesia) Nadia Ravita (Indonesia) Aldila Sutjiadi; 6–2, 6–4	(Chinese Taipei) Joanna Garland (Thailand) Mananchaya Sawangkaew	(Thailand) Bunyawi Thamchaiwat (Denmark) Olga Helmi	(Thailand) Tamachan Momkoonthod (China) Sun Ziyue (Chinese Taipei) Cho Yi-tsen (Japan) Sakura Hosogi
December 3	Monastir, Tunisia; Hard $15,000; Singles and doubles draws	(Switzerland) Leonie Küng; 6–2, 6–4	(Serbia) Bojana Marinković	(United States) Chiara Scholl (France) Émeline Dartron	(Russia) Margarita Lazareva (Croatia) Silvia Njirić (France) Juliette Loliée (Hong Kong) Adithya Karunaratne
December 3	Monastir, Tunisia; Hard $15,000; Singles and doubles draws	(Serbia) Tamara Čurović (United States) Chiara Scholl; 7–6^{(7–5)}, 6–4	(United Kingdom) Ali Collins (Italy) Claudia Giovine	(United States) Chiara Scholl (France) Émeline Dartron	(Russia) Margarita Lazareva (Croatia) Silvia Njirić (France) Juliette Loliée (Hong Kong) Adithya Karunaratne
December 3	Antalya, Turkey; Hard $15,000; Singles and doubles draws	(Romania) Ioana Gașpar; 6–1, 6–2	(France) Carole Monnet	(Turkey) Zeynep Sönmez (Bulgaria) Dia Evtimova	(Turkey) İlay Yörük (Georgia (country)) Mariam Dalakishvili (Russia) Angelina Zhuravleva (South Korea) Jeong Yeong-won
December 3	Antalya, Turkey; Hard $15,000; Singles and doubles draws	(Russia) Evgeniya Burdina / (Russia) Ekaterina Ovcharenko vs (Latvia) Alise Čerņecka / (Finland) Oona Orpana Doubles final cancelled due to bad weather		(Turkey) Zeynep Sönmez (Bulgaria) Dia Evtimova	(Turkey) İlay Yörük (Georgia (country)) Mariam Dalakishvili (Russia) Angelina Zhuravleva (South Korea) Jeong Yeong-won
December 10	Al Habtoor Tennis Challenge; Dubai, United Arab Emirates; Hard $100,000+H; Singles – Doubles	(China) Peng Shuai; 6–3, 6–0	(Slovakia) Viktória Kužmová	(Switzerland) Stefanie Vögele (Russia) Evgeniya Rodina	(France) Kristina Mladenovic (Germany) Tatjana Maria (Slovenia) Tamara Zidanšek (Germany) Mona Barthel
December 10	Al Habtoor Tennis Challenge; Dubai, United Arab Emirates; Hard $100,000+H; Singles – Doubles	(Russia) Alena Fomina (Russia) Valentina Ivakhnenko; 7–5, 6–2	(Hungary) Réka Luca Jani (Sweden) Cornelia Lister	(Switzerland) Stefanie Vögele (Russia) Evgeniya Rodina	(France) Kristina Mladenovic (Germany) Tatjana Maria (Slovenia) Tamara Zidanšek (Germany) Mona Barthel
December 10	NECC–ITF Women's Tennis Championships; Pune, India; Hard $25,000; Singles and doubles draws	(Russia) Valeria Savinykh; 3–6, 6–2, 7–6^{(9–7)}	(China) Lu Jiajing	(Georgia (country)) Mariam Bolkvadze (Poland) Katarzyna Kawa	(Russia) Ekaterina Yashina (Latvia) Diāna Marcinkēviča (Chinese Taipei) Hsu Chieh-yu (Russia) Marina Melnikova
December 10	NECC–ITF Women's Tennis Championships; Pune, India; Hard $25,000; Singles and doubles draws	(Indonesia) Beatrice Gumulya (Montenegro) Ana Veselinović; 7–6^{(7–4)}, 1–6, [11–9]	(Canada) Sharon Fichman (Russia) Valeria Savinykh	(Georgia (country)) Mariam Bolkvadze (Poland) Katarzyna Kawa	(Russia) Ekaterina Yashina (Latvia) Diāna Marcinkēviča (Chinese Taipei) Hsu Chieh-yu (Russia) Marina Melnikova
December 10	Djibouti, Djibouti; Hard $15,000; Singles and doubles draws	(Netherlands) Noa Liauw a Fong; 6–2, 6–2	(Hong Kong) Maggie Ng	(Russia) Anzhelika Isaeva (Croatia) Mariana Dražić	(Hong Kong) Wu Ho-ching (China) Wang Danni (Germany) Katharina Hering (Netherlands) Merel Hoedt
December 10	Djibouti, Djibouti; Hard $15,000; Singles and doubles draws	(Gabon) Célestine Avomo Ella (Serbia) Elena Gemović; 6–4, 6–1	(Germany) Patricia Böntgen (Hong Kong) Maggie Ng	(Russia) Anzhelika Isaeva (Croatia) Mariana Dražić	(Hong Kong) Wu Ho-ching (China) Wang Danni (Germany) Katharina Hering (Netherlands) Merel Hoedt
December 10	Cairo, Egypt; Clay $15,000; Singles and doubles draws	(Ukraine) Anastasiya Shoshyna; 6–4, 1–6, 6–4	(Egypt) Sandra Samir	(Germany) Julyette Steur (Spain) Ana Lantigua de la Nuez	(Romania) Oana Gavrilă (Romania) Gabriela Nicole Tătăruș (Kazakhstan) Yekaterina Dmitrichenko (Egypt) Lamis Alhussein Abdel Aziz
December 10	Cairo, Egypt; Clay $15,000; Singles and doubles draws	(Romania) Selma Ștefania Cadar (Slovenia) Nika Radišič; 6–3, 0–6, [14–12]	(Romania) Oana Gavrilă (Romania) Gabriela Nicole Tătăruș	(Germany) Julyette Steur (Spain) Ana Lantigua de la Nuez	(Romania) Oana Gavrilă (Romania) Gabriela Nicole Tătăruș (Kazakhstan) Yekaterina Dmitrichenko (Egypt) Lamis Alhussein Abdel Aziz
December 10	Solarino, Italy; Carpet $15,000; Singles and doubles draws	(Spain) Júlia Payola; 6–2, 2–6, 7–6^{(7–4)}	(Bosnia and Herzegovina) Jelena Simić	(Italy) Sara Gambogi (Malta) Elaine Genovese	(France) Lou Adler (Italy) Miriana Tona (Slovenia) Veronika Erjavec (Slovenia) Kristina Novak
December 10	Solarino, Italy; Carpet $15,000; Singles and doubles draws	(Slovenia) Veronika Erjavec (Slovenia) Kristina Novak; 6–3, 7–6^{(7–4)}	(Guatemala) Melissa Morales (Guatemala) Kirsten-Andrea Weedon	(Italy) Sara Gambogi (Malta) Elaine Genovese	(France) Lou Adler (Italy) Miriana Tona (Slovenia) Veronika Erjavec (Slovenia) Kristina Novak
December 10	Monastir, Tunisia; Hard $15,000; Singles and doubles draws	(Italy) Claudia Giovine; 6–0, 6–0	(United States) Chiara Scholl	(Serbia) Bojana Marinković (France) Emma Léné	(Belgium) Eliessa Vanlangendonck (France) Caroline Roméo (Russia) Daria Lodikova (Norway) Malene Helgø
December 10	Monastir, Tunisia; Hard $15,000; Singles and doubles draws	(Italy) Angelica Raggi (Italy) Aurora Zantedeschi; 6–4, 6–4	(Serbia) Bojana Marinković (Belgium) Eliessa Vanlangendonck	(Serbia) Bojana Marinković (France) Emma Léné	(Belgium) Eliessa Vanlangendonck (France) Caroline Roméo (Russia) Daria Lodikova (Norway) Malene Helgø
December 10	Antalya, Turkey; Hard $15,000; Singles and doubles draws	(Russia) Evgeniya Burdina; 6–4, 3–6, 7–5	(Israel) Vlada Ekshibarova	(Sweden) Lisa Zaar (South Korea) Jeong Yeong-won	(Turkey) Melis Sezer (Russia) Victoria Kan (Turkey) İpek Soylu (United States) Monica Robinson
December 10	Antalya, Turkey; Hard $15,000; Singles and doubles draws	(Russia) Daria Mishina (Russia) Anastasia Sukhotina; 7–6^{(7–4)}, 6–2	(Russia) Ekaterina Vishnevskaya (Russia) Angelina Zhuravleva	(Sweden) Lisa Zaar (South Korea) Jeong Yeong-won	(Turkey) Melis Sezer (Russia) Victoria Kan (Turkey) İpek Soylu (United States) Monica Robinson
December 17	Navi Mumbai, India; Hard $25,000; Singles and doubles draws	(Austria) Barbara Haas; 0–6, 6–3, 7–5	(Latvia) Diāna Marcinkēviča	(Georgia (country)) Mariam Bolkvadze (India) Mahak Jain	(France) Julie Gervais (United States) Jacqueline Cako (France) Tessah Andrianjafitrimo (Poland) Katarzyna Kawa
December 17	Navi Mumbai, India; Hard $25,000; Singles and doubles draws	(Uzbekistan) Albina Khabibulina (Russia) Ekaterina Yashina; 6–2, 6–1	(Turkey) Berfu Cengiz (Indonesia) Jessy Rompies	(Georgia (country)) Mariam Bolkvadze (India) Mahak Jain	(France) Julie Gervais (United States) Jacqueline Cako (France) Tessah Andrianjafitrimo (Poland) Katarzyna Kawa
December 17	Djibouti, Djibouti; Hard $15,000; Singles and doubles draws	(Netherlands) Noa Liauw a Fong; 6–3, 7–6^{(7–2)}	(Belarus) Katsiaryna Skachkova	(Germany) Katharina Hering (Croatia) Mariana Dražić	(Hong Kong) Wu Ho-ching (United Kingdom) Destinee Martins (India) Bhuvana Kalva (Netherlands) Merel Hoedt
December 17	Djibouti, Djibouti; Hard $15,000; Singles and doubles draws	(Netherlands) Merel Hoedt (Netherlands) Noa Liauw a Fong; 7–6^{(8–6)}, 6–4	(Germany) Patricia Böntgen (Germany) Katharina Hering	(Germany) Katharina Hering (Croatia) Mariana Dražić	(Hong Kong) Wu Ho-ching (United Kingdom) Destinee Martins (India) Bhuvana Kalva (Netherlands) Merel Hoedt
December 17	Internazionali Tennis Val Gardena Südtirol; Ortisei, Italy; Hard (indoor) $15,000; Singles and doubles draws	(Switzerland) Simona Waltert; 6–4, 6–2	(Chinese Taipei) Joanna Garland	(Germany) Natalia Siedliska (Germany) Nora Niedmers	(Croatia) Iva Zelić (Slovenia) Veronika Erjavec (Italy) Verena Hofer (Czech Republic) Michaela Bayerlová
December 17	Internazionali Tennis Val Gardena Südtirol; Ortisei, Italy; Hard (indoor) $15,000; Singles and doubles draws	(Slovenia) Veronika Erjavec (Slovenia) Kristina Novak; 6–4, 7–5	(Italy) Verena Hofer (Switzerland) Simona Waltert	(Germany) Natalia Siedliska (Germany) Nora Niedmers	(Croatia) Iva Zelić (Slovenia) Veronika Erjavec (Italy) Verena Hofer (Czech Republic) Michaela Bayerlová
December 17	Monastir, Tunisia; Hard $15,000; Singles and doubles draws	(Italy) Claudia Giovine; 6–1, 7–6^{(8–6)}	(United States) Chiara Scholl	(Italy) Angelica Raggi (Belgium) Eliessa Vanlangendonck	(France) Emma Léné (Italy) Giorgia Marchetti (Russia) Ekaterina Shalimova (France) Caroline Roméo
December 17	Monastir, Tunisia; Hard $15,000; Singles and doubles draws	(United States) Chiara Scholl (Australia) Alicia Smith; 6–1, 6–3	(Italy) Giorgia Marchetti (Italy) Angelica Raggi	(Italy) Angelica Raggi (Belgium) Eliessa Vanlangendonck	(France) Emma Léné (Italy) Giorgia Marchetti (Russia) Ekaterina Shalimova (France) Caroline Roméo
December 17	Antalya, Turkey; Hard $15,000; Singles and doubles draws	(Russia) Daria Mishina; 6–3, 6–1	(Russia) Ekaterina Vishnevskaya	(Croatia) Ivana Topčić (Ukraine) Anastasiya Shoshyna	(Romania) Ioana Gașpar (Bulgaria) Dia Evtimova (Turkey) Melis Sezer (Russia) Angelina Zhuravleva
December 17	Antalya, Turkey; Hard $15,000; Singles and doubles draws	(Russia) Anastasia Pribylova (Russia) Anna Pribylova; 6–7^{(5–7)}, 6–3, [10–7]	(Russia) Ekaterina Vishnevskaya (Russia) Angelina Zhuravleva	(Croatia) Ivana Topčić (Ukraine) Anastasiya Shoshyna	(Romania) Ioana Gașpar (Bulgaria) Dia Evtimova (Turkey) Melis Sezer (Russia) Angelina Zhuravleva
