= 2019 Challenger Banque Nationale de Saguenay – Singles =

Singles
- 2019 Challenger Banque Nationale de Saguenay

Final
- Champion: (Netherlands) Indy de Vroome
- Runner-up: (United States) Robin Anderson
- Score: 3–6, 6–4, 7–5

Events
Singles	Doubles
← 2018 ·	Challenger de Saguenay	· 2022 →

Katherine Sebov was the defending champion, but chose not to participate.

Indy de Vroome won the title, defeating Robin Anderson in the final, 3–6, 6–4, 7–5.

== Seeds ==
1. (United States) Francesca Di Lorenzo (second round)
2. (Netherlands) Bibiane Schoofs (quarterfinals)
3. (United States) Robin Anderson (final)
4. (France) Jessika Ponchet (second round)
5. (Canada) Leylah Annie Fernandez (quarterfinals)
6. (United Kingdom) Samantha Murray (semifinals)
7. (Thailand) Peangtarn Plipuech (first round)
8. (Sweden) Mirjam Björklund (first round)

== Draw ==
=== Key ===
- Q = Qualifier
- WC = Wild card
- LL = Lucky loser
- Alt = Alternate
- SE = Special exempt
- PR = Protected ranking
- ITF = ITF entry
- JE = Junior exempt
- w/o = Walkover
- r = Retired
- d = Defaulted
- SR = Special ranking

=== Finals ===
Semifinals
(Netherlands) Indy de Vroome	6^{4}	7^{8}	7^{7}
(Canada) Françoise Abanda	7^{7}	6^{6}	6^{5}
3	(United States) Robin Anderson	6	6
6	(United Kingdom) Samantha Murray	1	1

Final
(Netherlands) Indy de Vroome	3	6	7
3	(United States) Robin Anderson	6	4	5

=== Top half ===
First round
1	(United States) F Di Lorenzo	4	6	7^{7}
(United States) E Bektas	6	0	6^{4}
LL	(United States) S Carrington	7^{7}	0	1
(Netherlands) I de Vroome	6^{2}	6	6
(Netherlands) A Hartono	4	6	6
Q	(Russia) A Morgina	6	4	4
Q	(United States) J Livianu	7	6
8	(Sweden) M Björklund	5	3
4	(France) J Ponchet	6	6
(Czech Republic) M Bayerlová	3	2
(Canada) F Abanda	6	6
Q	(Canada) S-M Fortin	3	3
(United Kingdom) T Moore	7^{7}	6
Q	(Canada) M Stakusic	6^{4}	1
(Belgium) K Zimmermann	6	6
7	(Thailand) P Plipuech	1	0

Second round
1	(United States) F Di Lorenzo	4	0
(Netherlands) I de Vroome	6	6
(Netherlands) A Hartono	6	2	6^{6}
Q	(United States) J Livianu	3	6	7^{8}
4	(France) J Ponchet	5	2
(Canada) F Abanda	7	6
(United Kingdom) T Moore	6	2	4
(Belgium) K Zimmermann	3	6	6

Quarterfinals
(Netherlands) I de Vroome	6	4	6
Q	(United States) J Livianu	2	6	4
(Canada) F Abanda	6	5	6
(Belgium) K Zimmermann	4	7	3

Semifinals
(Netherlands) I de Vroome	6^{4}	7^{8}	7^{7}
(Canada) F Abanda	7^{7}	6^{6}	6^{5}

=== Bottom half ===
First round
5	(Canada) LA Fernandez	6	6
Q	(Canada) A Arseneault	3	1
WC	(Canada) M Collard	6	6
Q	(Canada) A Broomfield	2	0
Q	(United States) K Shaffer	6	6
WC	(Canada) M Tanasescu	4	4
WC	(Canada) J Bui	6^{6}	6	1
3	(United States) R Anderson	7^{8}	2	6
6	(United Kingdom) S Murray	6	1	6
(Slovakia) V Morvayová	3	6	3
Q	(Germany) J Jebawy	0	5
(Switzerland) T Sugnaux	6	7
(United States) Q Gleason	6	1
(India) R Bhosale	1	1^{r}
WC	(Canada) R Lacasse	3	1
2	(Netherlands) B Schoofs	6	6

Second round
5	(Canada) LA Fernandez	6	6
WC	(Canada) M Collard	4	3
Q	(United States) K Shaffer	2	4
3	(United States) R Anderson	6	6
6	(United Kingdom) S Murray	6^{6}	7^{7}	6
(Switzerland) T Sugnaux	7^{8}	6^{3}	4
(United States) Q Gleason	3	1
2	(Netherlands) B Schoofs	6	6

Quarterfinals
5	(Canada) LA Fernandez	6	4	3
3	(United States) R Anderson	3	6	6
6	(United Kingdom) S Murray	7^{8}	6
2	(Netherlands) B Schoofs	6^{6}	3

Semifinals
3	(United States) R Anderson	6	6
6	(United Kingdom) S Murray	1	1
