= Ecaterina Visnevscaia =

Russian–Moldovan tennis player

Ecaterina Visnevscaia Ekaterina Vishnevskaya
- Full name: Ecaterina Sergeyevna Visnevscaia
- Country (sports): Russia (2016–2021); Moldova (2022–)
- Born: 27 November 1999 (age 26)
- Plays: Right (two-handed backhand)
- Prize money: $33,520

Singles
- Career record: 108–106
- Career titles: 1 ITF
- Highest ranking: No. 523 (22 October 2018)

Doubles
- Career record: 74–69
- Career titles: 4 ITF
- Highest ranking: No. 477 (1 October 2018)

Team competitions
- Fed Cup: 4–3

Ecaterina Sergeyevna Visnevscaia or Ekaterina Vishnevskaya (Russian: Екатерина Сергеевна Вишневская, romanized: Ekaterina Sergeevna Vishnevskaya; born 27 November 1999) is a Russian-Moldovan inactive tennis player. She represented Russia from 2016 to 2021, until she gained Moldovan citizenship in 2022.

Visnevscaia has won one singles title and four doubles titles on the ITF Women's Circuit. On 22 October 2018, she reached her best singles ranking of world No. 523. On 1 October 2018, she peaked at No. 477 in the doubles rankings.

Visnevscaia made her Billie Jean King Cup debut for Moldova in 2022.

== ITF Circuit finals ==
=== Singles: 3 (1 title, 2 runner-ups) ===
Legend
W35 tournaments
W15 tournaments

Result	W–L	Date	Tournament	Tier	Surface	Opponent	Score
Win	1–0	Oct 2017	ITF Antalya, Turkey	W15	Clay	(Bulgaria) Dia Evtimova	6–3, 0–6, 7–5
Loss	1–1	Dec 2018	ITF Antalya, Turkey	W15	Clay	(Russia) Daria Mishina	3–6, 1–6
Loss	1–2	Jun 2019	ITF Netanya, Israel	W15	Hard	(Russia) Anastasia Zakharova	2–6, 0–2 ret.

=== Doubles: 8 (4 titles, 4 runner-ups) ===
Result	W–L	Date	Tournament	Tier	Surface	Partner	Opponents	Score
Win	1–0	Oct 2017	ITF Antalya, Turkey	15,000	Clay	(Russia) Daria Nazarkina	(Czech Republic) Gabriela Horáčková (Bulgaria) Ani Vangelova	6–2, 6–2
Win	2–0	Nov 2017	ITF Antalya, Turkey	15,000	Clay	(Moldova) Vitalia Stamat	(Turkey) İpek Öz (Czech Republic) Gabriela Pantůčková	6–3, 7–5
Loss	2–1	Jan 2018	ITF Antalya, Turkey	15,000	Clay	(Turkey) İpek Öz	(Romania) Oana Gavrilă (Romania) Andreea Roșca	4–6, 2–6
Loss	2–2	Dec 2018	ITF Antalya, Turkey	15,000	Hard	(Russia) Angelina Zhuravleva	(Russia) Daria Mishina (Russia) Anastasia Sukhotina	6–7^{(4)}, 2–6
Loss	2–3	Dec 2018	ITF Antalya, Turkey	15,000	Hard	(Russia) Angelina Zhuravleva	(Russia) Anastasia Pribylova (Russia) Anna Pribylova	7–6^{(5)}, 3–6, [7–10]
Loss	2–4	Oct 2020	ITF Monastir, Tunisia	W15	Hard	(Russia) Anna Ureke	(Poland) Weronika Falkowska (Germany) Lisa Ponomar	1–6, 0–6
Win	3–4	Jun 2021	ITF Prokuplje, Serbia	W15	Clay	(Romania) Ioana Gașpar	(France) Alice Robbe (Czech Republic) Draginja Vuković	6–4, 6–3
Win	4–4	Sep 2021	ITF Cairo, Egypt	W15	Clay	(Russia) Anastasia Zolotareva	(Thailand) Punnin Kovapitukted (Russia) Anna Ureke	7–5, 0–6, [10–3]

== Fed Cup participation ==
=== Doubles (1–0) ===
Edition	Stage	Date	Location	Against	Surface	Partner	Opponents	W/L	Score
2022	Z1 P/O	11 June 2022	Ulcinj, Montenegro	Montenegro	Clay	Arina Gamretkaia	(Montenegro) Iva Lakić (Montenegro) Petra Mirković	W	4–6, 7–6^{(3)}, 6–2
