= 2019 Challenger Banque Nationale de Saguenay =

- Date: 21–27 October 2019
- Edition: 14th
- Category: ITF Women's World Tennis Tour
- Prize money: $60,000
- Surface: Hard / Indoor
- Location: Saguenay, Quebec, Canada

Champions

Singles
- (Netherlands) Indy de Vroome

Doubles
- (Canada) Mélodie Collard / (Canada) Leylah Annie Fernandez
← 2018 ·	Challenger de Saguenay	· 2022 →

The 2019 Challenger Banque Nationale de Saguenay was a professional tennis tournament played on indoor hard courts. It was the fourteenth edition of the tournament which was part of the 2019 ITF Women's World Tennis Tour. It took place in Saguenay, Quebec, Canada between 21 and 27 October 2019.

== Singles main-draw entrants ==
=== Seeds ===
Country	Player	Rank^{1}	Seed
USA	Francesca Di Lorenzo	138	1
NED	Bibiane Schoofs	157	2
USA	Robin Anderson	176	3
FRA	Jessika Ponchet	184	4
CAN	Leylah Annie Fernandez	248	5
GBR	Samantha Murray	278	6
THA	Peangtarn Plipuech	312	7
SWE	Mirjam Björklund	345	8

- ^{1} Rankings are as of 14 October 2019.

=== Other entrants ===
The following players received wildcards into the singles main draw:

- (Canada) Jada Bui
- (Canada) Mélodie Collard
- (Canada) Raphaëlle Lacasse
- (Canada) Maria Tanasescu

The following players received entry from the qualifying draw:

- (Canada) Ariana Arseneault
- (Canada) Ayan Broomfield
- (Canada) Sarah-Maude Fortin
- (Germany) Jasmin Jebawy
- (United States) Jessica Livianu
- (Russia) Anna Morgina
- (United States) Kennedy Shaffer
- (Canada) Marina Stakusic

The following player received entry as a lucky loser:

- (United States) Safiya Carrington

== Champions ==
=== Singles ===
- (Netherlands) Indy de Vroome def. (United States) Robin Anderson, 3–6, 6–4, 7–5

=== Doubles ===
- (Canada) Mélodie Collard / (Canada) Leylah Annie Fernandez def. (United Kingdom) Samantha Murray / (Netherlands) Bibiane Schoofs, 7–6^{(7–3)}, 6–2
