= 2019 Challenger Banque Nationale de Saguenay – Doubles =

Doubles
- 2019 Challenger Banque Nationale de Saguenay

Final
- Champions: (Canada) Mélodie Collard (Canada) Leylah Annie Fernandez
- Runners-up: (United Kingdom) Samantha Murray (Netherlands) Bibiane Schoofs
- Score: 7–6^{(7–3)}, 6–2

Events
Singles	Doubles
- Challenger de Saguenay

Tara Moore and Conny Perrin were the defending champions, but Perrin chose not to participate. Moore partnered Emina Bektas, but lost to Samantha Murray and Bibiane Schoofs in the semifinals.

Mélodie Collard and Leylah Annie Fernandez won the title, defeating Murray and Schoofs in the final, 7–6^{(7–3)}, 6–2.

== Seeds ==
1. (United Kingdom) Samantha Murray / (Netherlands) Bibiane Schoofs (final)
2. (India) Rutuja Bhosale / (Thailand) Peangtarn Plipuech (quarterfinals, retired)
3. (United States) Emina Bektas / (United Kingdom) Tara Moore (semifinals)
4. (United States) Francesca Di Lorenzo / (United States) Quinn Gleason (first round)

== Draw ==
Key

- Q = Qualifier
- WC = Wild card
- LL = Lucky loser
- Alt = Alternate
- ITF = ITF entry
- PR = Protected ranking
- SR = Special ranking
- SE = Special exempt
- JE = Junior exempt
- JR = Junior Accelerator Programme entrant
- CO = College Accelerator Programme entrant
- NG = Next Gen Accelerator Program entrant
- w/o = Walkover
- r = Retired
- d = Defaulted

=== Draw ===
First round
1	(United Kingdom) S Murray (Netherlands) B Schoofs	6	7
WC	(Canada) S-M Fortin (Canada) C Leduc	3	5
(United States) S Carrington (United States) D Hewitt	6	6
(Canada) L Kwong (United States) K Shaffer	4	2
3	(United States) E Bektas (United Kingdom) T Moore	6	6^{9}	[10]
(Canada) A Arseneault (Canada) J Bui	3	7^{11}	[6]
(United States) S Mohamad (Canada) NL Nsimba	3	5
(Switzerland) T Sugnaux (Belgium) K Zimmermann	6	7
WC	(Canada) M Collard (Canada) LA Fernandez	6	7
(United States) J Livianu (Canada) M Tanasescu	2	5
(Czech Republic) M Bayerlová (Netherlands) A Hartono	6	6
4	(United States) F Di Lorenzo (United States) Q Gleason	4	2
(Germany) J Jebawy (Canada) R Lacasse	6	2	[8]
(Russia) A Morgina (United States) H Verner	3	6	[10]
WC	(Canada) M Kupres (Canada) M Stakusic	2	3
2	(India) R Bhosale (Thailand) P Plipuech	6	6

Quarterfinals
1	(United Kingdom) S Murray (Netherlands) B Schoofs	6	6
(United States) S Carrington (United States) D Hewitt	4	3
3	(United States) E Bektas (United Kingdom) T Moore	6	6
(Switzerland) T Sugnaux (Belgium) K Zimmermann	4	2
WC	(Canada) M Collard (Canada) LA Fernandez	6	7
(Czech Republic) M Bayerlová (Netherlands) A Hartono	1	5
(Russia) A Morgina (United States) H Verner	6	3
2	(India) R Bhosale (Thailand) P Plipuech	3	0^{r}

Semifinals
1	(United Kingdom) S Murray (Netherlands) B Schoofs	6	6
3	(United States) E Bektas (United Kingdom) T Moore	4	3
WC	(Canada) M Collard (Canada) LA Fernandez	6	6
(Russia) A Morgina (United States) H Verner	4	1

Final
1	(United Kingdom) S Murray (Netherlands) B Schoofs	6^{3}	2
WC	(Canada) M Collard (Canada) LA Fernandez	7^{7}	6
