= Mélodie Collard =

Canadian tennis player (born 2003)

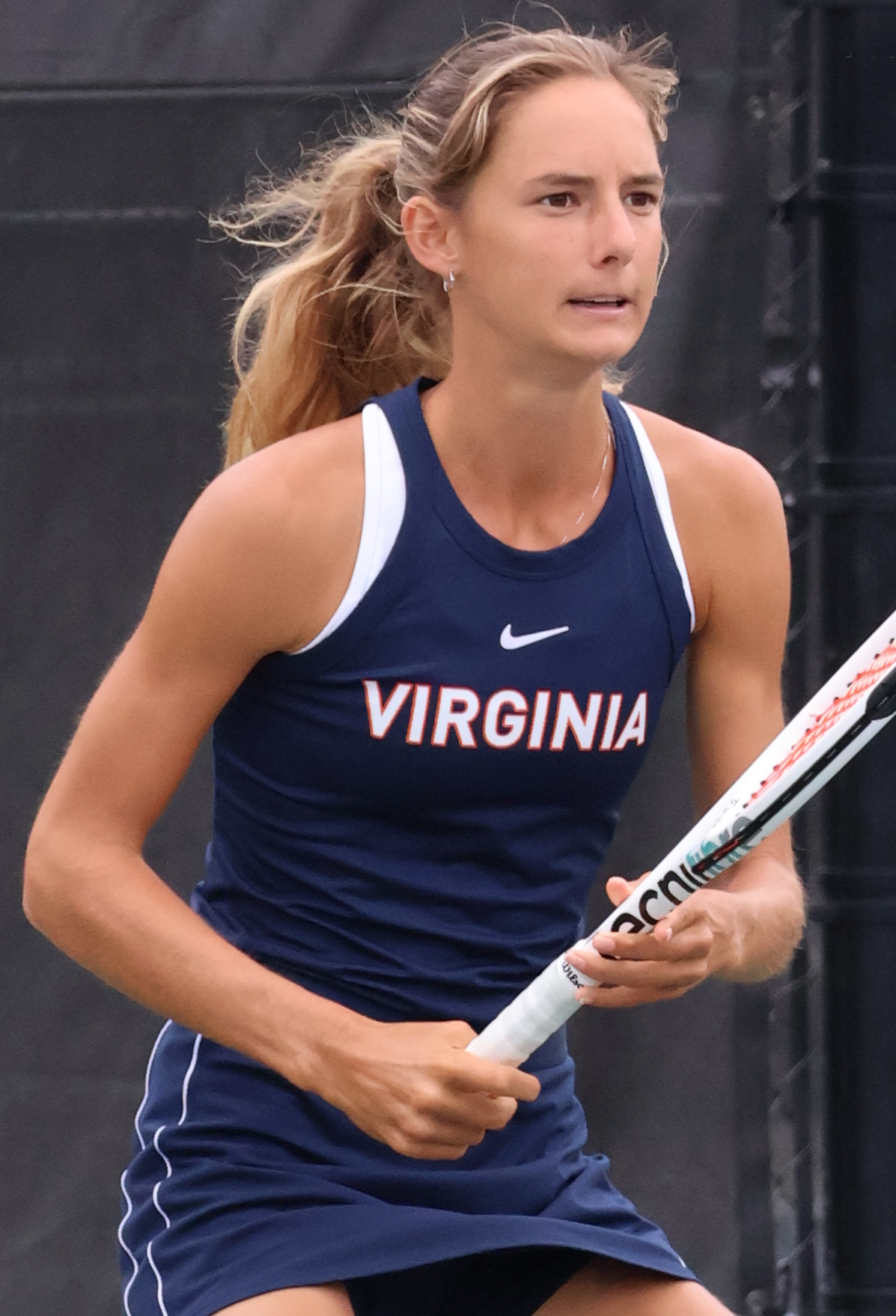
- Collard in 2023
- Country (sports): Canada
- Born: 29 June 2003 (age 23) Gatineau, Quebec
- Plays: Right (two-handed backhand)
- Prize money: $15,032

Singles
- Career record: 8–13
- Highest ranking: No. 989 (19 April 2021)

Doubles
- Career record: 12–9
- Career titles: 1 ITF
- Highest ranking: No. 336 (16 August 2021)
- Current ranking: No. 849 (29 June 2026)
- Last updated on: 10 July 2026.

Mélodie Collard (born 29 June 2003) is a Canadian tennis player. She plays college tennis for the Virginia Cavaliers.

On the ITF Junior Circuit, Collard has a career-high combined ranking of 36, achieved on 16 September 2019.

She won her first ITF pro title at the 2019 Challenger de Saguenay, in the doubles draw, partnering Leylah Fernandez.

After August 2021, Collard was (besides college tennis) inactive on ITF tournaments most of the time. Until October 2025, she participated only in the doubles draw of the Charlottesville Open in April 2023.

== ITF Circuit ==
=== Doubles: 2 (1 title, 1 runner-up) ===
Legend
$60,000 tournaments

Result	Date	Tournament	Tier	Surface	Partner	Opponents	Score
Win	Oct 2019	Challenger de Saguenay, Canada	60,000	Hard (i)	(Canada) Leylah Fernandez	(United Kingdom) Samantha Murray (Netherlands) Bibiane Schoofs	7–6^{(3)}, 6–2
Loss	Nov 2019	Toronto Challenger, Canada	60,000	Hard (i)	(Canada) Leylah Fernandez	(United States) Robin Anderson (France) Jessika Ponchet	6–7^{(7)}, 2–6
