= 2018 Challenger Banque Nationale de Saguenay – Singles =

Singles
- 2018 Challenger Banque Nationale de Saguenay

Final
- Champion: (Canada) Katherine Sebov
- Runner-up: (Netherlands) Quirine Lemoine
- Score: 7–6^{(12–10)}, 7–6^{(7–4)}

Events
Singles	Doubles
← 2017 ·	Challenger de Saguenay	· 2019 →

Gréta Arn was the defending champion, but chose not to participate.

Katherine Sebov won the title, defeating Quirine Lemoine in the final, 7–6^{(12–10)}, 7–6^{(7–4)}.

== Seeds ==
1. (Ukraine) Kateryna Kozlova (quarterfinals)
2. (Switzerland) Conny Perrin (quarterfinals)
3. (Netherlands) Richèl Hogenkamp (quarterfinals)
4. (United Kingdom) Naomi Broady (first round)
5. (Bulgaria) Elitsa Kostova (first round)
6. (France) Jessika Ponchet (quarterfinals)
7. (Canada) Bianca Andreescu (semifinals, retired)
8. (Belgium) Kimberley Zimmermann (first round)

== Draw ==
=== Key ===
- Q = Qualifier
- WC = Wild card
- LL = Lucky loser
- Alt = Alternate
- SE = Special exempt
- PR = Protected ranking
- ITF = ITF entry
- JE = Junior exempt
- w/o = Walkover
- r = Retired
- d = Defaulted
- SR = Special ranking

=== Finals ===
Semifinals
(Canada) Katherine Sebov	6	1	6
Q	(Ukraine) Daria Lopatetska	2	6	2
7	(Canada) Bianca Andreescu	6^{4}	0^{r}
(Netherlands) Quirine Lemoine	7^{7}	2

Final
(Canada) Katherine Sebov	7^{12}	7^{7}
(Netherlands) Quirine Lemoine	6^{10}	6^{4}

=== Top half ===
First round
1	(Ukraine) K Kozlova	6	4
(France) S Reix	4	0^{r}
(United States) J Cako	6^{3}	6	5
WC	(Canada) A Vagramov	7^{7}	1	7
Q	(United States) K Shaffer	6	6
(Switzerland) A Sadiković	2	1
(Canada) K Sebov	0	6	6
8	(Belgium) K Zimmermann	6	1	4
4	(United Kingdom) N Broady	3	2
Q	(Ukraine) D Lopatetska	6	6
(France) M Arcangioli	1	5
(Japan) M Osaka	6	2^{r}
(United States) UM Arconada	6	4	1
(United States) R Anderson	4	6	6
(United Kingdom) T Moore	1	1
6	(France) J Ponchet	6	6

Second round
1	(Ukraine) K Kozlova	6	6
WC	(Canada) A Vagramov	2	0
Q	(United States) K Shaffer	2	2
(Canada) K Sebov	6	6
Q	(Ukraine) D Lopatetska	6	5	6
(France) M Arcangioli	0	7	2
(United States) R Anderson	2	6	3
6	(France) J Ponchet	6	3	6

Quarterfinals
1	(Ukraine) K Kozlova	1	1
(Canada) K Sebov	6	6
Q	(Ukraine) D Lopatetska	7	6
6	(France) J Ponchet	5	4

Semifinals
(Canada) K Sebov	6	1	6
Q	(Ukraine) D Lopatetska	2	6	2

=== Bottom half ===
First round
7	(Canada) B Andreescu	6	6
WC	(Canada) P Januskova	1	0
Q	(United States) H Carter	6	3	6
Q	(United States) J Ho	1	6	4
WC	(Canada) C Branstine	2	6^{6}
(United Kingdom) F Jones	6	7^{8}
(Poland) M Chwalińska	6	6^{5}	3
3	(Netherlands) R Hogenkamp	4	7^{7}	6
5	(Bulgaria) E Kostova	4	3
WC	(Canada) J Bui	6	6
(Netherlands) Q Lemoine	6	6
(Romania) A Cadanțu	1	1
(United States) M Sanchez	6	6
(United States) M Mateas	2	4
(United States) M Manasse	1	2
2	(Switzerland) C Perrin	6	6

Second round
7	(Canada) B Andreescu	7	7
Q	(United States) H Carter	5	5
(United Kingdom) F Jones	2	5
3	(Netherlands) R Hogenkamp	6	7
WC	(Canada) J Bui	1	1
(Netherlands) Q Lemoine	6	6
(United States) M Sanchez	6	5	2
2	(Switzerland) C Perrin	4	7	6

Quarterfinals
7	(Canada) B Andreescu	4	6	6
3	(Netherlands) R Hogenkamp	6	3	1
(Netherlands) Q Lemoine	6	7
2	(Switzerland) C Perrin	4	5

Semifinals
7	(Canada) B Andreescu	6^{4}	0^{r}
(Netherlands) Q Lemoine	7^{7}	2
