= 2018 Challenger Banque Nationale de Saguenay =

- Date: 22–28 October
- Edition: 13th
- Category: ITF Women's Circuit
- Prize money: $60,000
- Surface: Hard / Indoor
- Location: Saguenay, Quebec, Canada

Champions

Singles
- (Canada) Katherine Sebov

Doubles
- (United Kingdom) Tara Moore / (Switzerland) Conny Perrin
← 2017 ·	Challenger de Saguenay	· 2019 →

The 2018 Challenger Banque Nationale de Saguenay was a professional tennis tournament played on indoor hard courts. It was the thirteenth edition of the tournament and was part of the 2018 ITF Women's Circuit. It took place in Saguenay, Quebec, Canada, on 22–28 October 2018.

== Singles main draw entrants ==
=== Seeds ===
Country	Player	Rank^{1}	Seed
UKR	Kateryna Kozlova	106	1
SUI	Conny Perrin	135	2
NED	Richèl Hogenkamp	160	3
GBR	Naomi Broady	164	4
BUL	Elitsa Kostova	210	5
FRA	Jessika Ponchet	229	6
CAN	Bianca Andreescu	242	7
BEL	Kimberley Zimmermann	248	8

- ^{1} Rankings as of 15 October 2018.

=== Other entrants ===
The following players received a wildcard into the singles main draw:

- (Canada) Carson Branstine
- (Canada) Jada Bui
- (Canada) Petra Januskova
- (Canada) Alexandra Vagramov

The following players received entry from the qualifying draw:

- (United States) Hayley Carter
- (United States) Jessica Ho
- (Ukraine) Daria Lopatetska
- (United States) Kennedy Shaffer

== Champions ==
=== Singles ===
- (Canada) Katherine Sebov def. (Netherlands) Quirine Lemoine, 7–6^{(12–10)}, 7–6^{(7–4)}

=== Doubles ===
- (United Kingdom) Tara Moore / (Switzerland) Conny Perrin def. (Canada) Sharon Fichman / (United States) Maria Sanchez, 6–0, 5–7, [10–7]
