= Shahar Biran =

Israeli tennis player

Shahar Biran שחר בירן
- Country (sports): Israel
- Born: 13 September 1998 (age 28) Hod HaSharon, Israel
- Height: 5-9
- Plays: Right-handed (two-handed backhand)
- Prize money: $11,418

Singles
- Career record: 62–65
- Career titles: 0
- Highest ranking: 805 (August 5, 2019)
- Current ranking: 999 (March 16, 2020)

Doubles
- Career record: 23–39
- Career titles: 0
- Highest ranking: 793 (August 5, 2019)
- Current ranking: 1021 (March 16, 2020)

Team competitions
- Fed Cup: 0–1
- Last updated on: March 16, 2020.

Shahar Biran (Hebrew: שחר בירן; born 13 September 1998) is an Israeli tennis player.

Biran has a career-high WTA singles ranking of 805, achieved on August 5, 2019. Her career-high WTA doubles ranking of 793, was achieved on August 5, 2019.

== Biography ==
Biran's hometown is Hod HaSharon, Israel.

She plays tennis for Old Dominion University in Norfolk, Virginia. In June 2020 Biran was named Conference USA Singles Second Team and Doubles Second Team after a spring season in which she was 7–0 in singles and 7–3 in doubles.

Biran made her Fed Cup debut for Israel in 2019.
