= 2018 Challenger Banque Nationale de Saguenay – Doubles =

Doubles
- 2018 Challenger Banque Nationale de Saguenay

Final
- Champions: (United Kingdom) Tara Moore (Switzerland) Conny Perrin
- Runners-up: (Canada) Sharon Fichman (United States) Maria Sanchez
- Score: 6–0, 5–7, [10–7]

Events
Singles	Doubles
- Challenger de Saguenay

Bianca Andreescu and Carol Zhao were the defending champions, but Zhao chose not to participate. Andreescu played alongside Carson Branstine, but lost in the quarterfinals to Elitsa Kostova and Katherine Sebov.

Tara Moore and Conny Perrin won the title after defeating Sharon Fichman and Maria Sanchez 6–0, 5–7, [10–7] in the final.

== Seeds ==
1. (United Kingdom) Naomi Broady / (Japan) Ayaka Okuno (first round)
2. (United States) Usue Maitane Arconada / (United States) Jacqueline Cako (first round)
3. (United Kingdom) Tara Moore / (Switzerland) Conny Perrin (champions)
4. (France) Manon Arcangioli / (France) Shérazad Reix (quarterfinals)

== Draw ==
Key

- Q = Qualifier
- WC = Wild card
- LL = Lucky loser
- Alt = Alternate
- ITF = ITF entry
- PR = Protected ranking
- SR = Special ranking
- SE = Special exempt
- JE = Junior exempt
- JR = Junior Accelerator Programme entrant
- CO = College Accelerator Programme entrant
- NG = Next Gen Accelerator Program entrant
- w/o = Walkover
- r = Retired
- d = Defaulted

=== Draw ===
First round
1	(United Kingdom) N Broady (Japan) A Okuno	6	3	[6]
(Bulgaria) E Kostova (Canada) K Sebov	4	6	[10]
(United States) H Carter (United States) C Harrison	7^{7}	6^{2}	[4]
(Canada) B Andreescu (Canada) C Branstine	6^{5}	7^{7}	[10]
3	(United Kingdom) T Moore (Switzerland) C Perrin	6	6
(United States) D Ivanova (Canada) P Januskova	4	3
(United States) R McAdoo (United States) A Parks	4	4
(United States) R Anderson (United States) M Manasse	6	6
(France) J Ponchet (Belgium) K Zimmermann	6	6
WC	(Canada) J Bui (Canada) A Vagramov	3	2
WC	(Canada) L Kwong (Canada) C Leduc	2	2
4	(France) M Arcangioli (France) S Reix	6	6
(Romania) E Bogdan (Romania) A Cadanțu	4	6	[8]
(United States) L Guillermo (United States) J Ho	6	4	[10]
(Canada) S Fichman (United States) M Sanchez	6	6
2	(United States) UM Arconada (United States) J Cako	1	3

Quarterfinals
(Bulgaria) E Kostova (Canada) K Sebov	6	6^{5}	[10]
(Canada) B Andreescu (Canada) C Branstine	2	7^{7}	[4]
3	(United Kingdom) T Moore (Switzerland) C Perrin	3	7^{7}	[10]
(United States) R Anderson (United States) M Manasse	6	6^{3}	[6]
(France) J Ponchet (Belgium) K Zimmermann	6	6
4	(France) M Arcangioli (France) S Reix	3	4
(United States) L Guillermo (United States) J Ho	6	6^{4}	[6]
(Canada) S Fichman (United States) M Sanchez	1	7^{7}	[10]

Semifinals
(Bulgaria) E Kostova (Canada) K Sebov	3	1
3	(United Kingdom) T Moore (Switzerland) C Perrin	6	6
(France) J Ponchet (Belgium) K Zimmermann	5	6^{11}
(Canada) S Fichman (United States) M Sanchez	7	7^{13}

Final
3	(United Kingdom) T Moore (Switzerland) C Perrin	6	5	[10]
(Canada) S Fichman (United States) M Sanchez	0	7	[7]
