= 2023 Challenger Banque Nationale de Saguenay =

Tennis tournament

- Date: 16–22 October 2023
- Edition: 16th
- Category: ITF Women's World Tennis Tour
- Prize money: $60,000
- Surface: Hard / Indoor
- Location: Saguenay, Quebec, Canada

Champions

Singles
- (Canada) Katherine Sebov

Doubles
- (United States) Robin Anderson / (United States) Dalayna Hewitt
| ← 2022 · | Challenger de Saguenay | · 2024 → |

The 2023 Challenger Banque Nationale de Saguenay was a professional tennis tournament played on indoor hard courts. It was the sixteenth edition of the tournament which was part of the 2023 ITF Women's World Tennis Tour. It took place in Saguenay, Quebec, Canada between 16 and 22 October 2023.

== Champions ==
=== Singles ===
- (Canada) Katherine Sebov def. (Hungary) Fanny Stollár, 6–4, 6–4

=== Doubles ===
- (United States) Robin Anderson / (United States) Dalayna Hewitt def. (Canada) Mia Kupres / (Denmark) Johanne Svendsen, 6–1, 6–4

== Singles main draw entrants ==
=== Seeds ===
| Country | Player | Rank^{1} | Seed |
|---|---|---|---|
| CAN | Katherine Sebov | 153 | 1 |
| AUS | Arina Rodionova | 163 | 2 |
| NED | Lesley Pattinama Kerkhove | 229 | 3 |
| JPN | Haruka Kaji | 245 | 4 |
| ~~SUI~~ | ~~Lulu Sun~~ | ~~247~~ | ~~5~~ |
| LTU | Justina Mikulskytė | 276 | 6 |
| CAN | Marina Stakusic | 299 | 7 |
| HUN | Fanny Stollár | 304 | 8 |

- ^{1} Rankings are as of 9 October 2023.

=== Other entrants ===
The following players received wildcards into the singles main draw:

- (Canada) Isabelle Boulais
- (Canada) Mia Kupres
- (Canada) Nadia Lagaev
- (Canada) Rhea Verma

The following players received entry from the qualifying draw:

- (United States) Carolyn Campana
- (United States) Paris Corley
- (Canada) Louise Kwong
- (Canada) Scarlett Nicholson
- (Thailand) Natasha Sengphrachanh
- (Canada) Layne Sleeth
- (United States) Anna Ulyashchenko
- (United States) Amy Zhu

The following player received entry as a lucky loser:

- (Germany) Jasmin Jebawy
