= 2024 Challenger Banque Nationale de Saguenay =

Tennis tournament

- Date: 21–27 October 2024
- Edition: 17th
- Category: ITF Women's World Tennis Tour
- Prize money: $60,000
- Surface: Hard / Indoor
- Location: Saguenay, Quebec, Canada

Champions

Singles
- (Croatia) Petra Marčinko

Doubles
- (United States) Dalayna Hewitt / (United States) Anna Rogers
← 2023 ·	Challenger de Saguenay	· 2025 →

The 2024 Challenger Banque Nationale de Saguenay was a professional tennis tournament played on indoor hard courts. It was the seventeenth edition of the tournament which was part of the 2024 ITF Women's World Tennis Tour. It took place in Saguenay, Quebec, Canada between 21 and 27 October 2024.

== Champions ==
=== Singles ===
- (Croatia) Petra Marčinko def. (Netherlands) Anouk Koevermans 6–3, 4–6, 7–6^{(7–3)}

=== Doubles ===
- (United States) Dalayna Hewitt / (United States) Anna Rogers def. (Belgium) Magali Kempen / (Belgium) Lara Salden 6–1, 7–5

== Singles main draw entrants ==
=== Seeds ===
Country	Player	Rank^{1}	Seed
CRO	Lucija Ćirić Bagarić	201	1
LTU	Justina Mikulskytė	214	2
CZE	Gabriela Knutson	218	3
NED	Anouk Koevermans	229	4
USA	Robin Anderson	255	5
CAN	Katherine Sebov	263	6
SVK	Viktória Hrunčáková	270	7
CAN	Carson Branstine	272	8

- ^{1} Rankings are as of 14 October 2024.

=== Other entrants ===
The following players received wildcards into the singles main draw:

- (Canada) Ariana Arseneault
- (Canada) Emma Dong
- (Canada) Ana Grubor
- (Canada) Nadia Lagaev

The following player received entry into the main draw as a special exempt:

- (United States) Anna Rogers

The following player received entry into the singles main draw using a special ranking:

- (United Kingdom) Tara Moore

The following players received entry from the qualifying draw:

- (United States) Sara Daavettila
- (Netherlands) Jasmijn Gimbrère
- (Japan) Mana Kawamura
- (Japan) Ayumi Koshiishi
- (Slovakia) Viktória Morvayová
- (Japan) Rinon Okuwaki
- ~~(Sweden) Rebecca Peterson~~
- (United States) Jada Robinson

The following player received entry as a lucky loser:

- (United States) Paris Corley
