= 2023 Challenger Banque Nationale de Saguenay – Singles =

Singles
- 2023 Challenger Banque Nationale de Saguenay

Final
- Champion: (Canada) Katherine Sebov
- Runner-up: (Hungary) Fanny Stollár
- Score: 6–4, 6–4

Events
Singles	Doubles
← 2022 ·	Challenger de Saguenay	· 2024 →

Karman Thandi is the defending champion but chose not to participate.

Katherine Sebov won the title, defeating Fanny Stollár in the final, 6–4, 6–4.

== Seeds ==
1. (Canada) Katherine Sebov (champion)
2. (Australia) Arina Rodionova (semifinals)
3. (Netherlands) Lesley Pattinama Kerkhove (first round)
4. (Japan) Haruka Kaji (first round)
5. (Switzerland) Lulu Sun (withdrew)
6. (Lithuania) Justina Mikulskytė (quarterfinals)
7. (Canada) Marina Stakusic (second round)
8. (Hungary) Fanny Stollár (final)

== Draw ==
=== Key ===
- Q = Qualifier
- WC = Wild card
- LL = Lucky loser
- Alt = Alternate
- SE = Special exempt
- PR = Protected ranking
- ITF = ITF entry
- JE = Junior exempt
- w/o = Walkover
- r = Retired
- d = Defaulted
- SR = Special ranking

=== Finals ===
Semifinals
1	(Canada) Katherine Sebov	6	6
WC	(Canada) Isabelle Boulais	1	0
8	(Hungary) Fanny Stollár	2	6	6
2	(Australia) Arina Rodionova	6	1	3

Final
1	(Canada) Katherine Sebov	6	6
8	(Hungary) Fanny Stollár	4	4

=== Top half ===
First round
1	(Canada) K Sebov	7	6
Q	(Thailand) N Sengphrachanh	5	2
WC	(Canada) R Verma	1	4
Q	(Canada) S Nicholson	6	6
(Canada) V Mboko	6	7^{7}
(United Kingdom) E Silva	4	6^{5}
(Japan) N Hanatani	3	5
7	(Canada) M Stakusic	6	7
4	(Japan) H Kaji	2	4
(United States) D Hewitt	6	6
(United States) M Sieg	6	6
LL	(Germany) J Jebawy	2	2
Q	(United States) A Zhu	4	2
(United Kingdom) SB Grey	6	6
WC	(Canada) I Boulais	6	6
Q	(United States) A Ulyashchenko	3	2

Second round
1	(Canada) K Sebov	6	6
Q	(Canada) S Nicholson	4	3
(Canada) V Mboko	4	6	6
7	(Canada) M Stakusic	6	4	3
(United States) D Hewitt	3	3
(United States) M Sieg	6	6
(United Kingdom) SB Grey	6	4	6^{2}
WC	(Canada) I Boulais	4	6	7^{7}

Quarterfinals
1	(Canada) K Sebov	6	6
(Canada) V Mboko	2	4
(United States) M Sieg	3	6^{7}
WC	(Canada) I Boulais	6	7^{9}

Semifinals
1	(Canada) K Sebov	6	6
WC	(Canada) I Boulais	1	0

=== Bottom half ===
First round
8	(Hungary) F Stollár	7^{7}	2	6
Q	(United States) C Campana	6^{3}	6	3
(Poland) U Radwańska	6	4	7
(Canada) C Brace	2	6	5
Q	(United States) P Corley	4	4
(Serbia) K Kozarov	6	6
(United States) R Anderson	6	4	6
3	(Netherlands) L Pattinama Kerkhove	4	6	3
6	(Lithuania) J Mikulskytė	6	6
WC	(Canada) M Kupres	3	2
WC	(Canada) N Lagaev	6	6
Q	(Canada) L Kwong	0	2
(France) C Roméo	3	6	7
Q	(Canada) L Sleeth	6	3	5
(Denmark) J Svendsen	6	3	4
2	(Australia) A Rodionova	1	6	6

Second round
8	(Hungary) F Stollár	6	7^{10}
(Poland) U Radwańska	3	6^{8}
(Serbia) K Kozarov	3	7^{10}	0
(United States) R Anderson	6	6^{8}	6
6	(Lithuania) J Mikulskytė	6	6
WC	(Canada) N Lagaev	4	0
(France) C Roméo	4	4
2	(Australia) A Rodionova	6	6

Quarterfinals
8	(Hungary) F Stollár	6^{5}	6	6
(United States) R Anderson	7^{7}	1	3
6	(Lithuania) J Mikulskytė	1	4
2	(Australia) A Rodionova	6	6

Semifinals
8	(Hungary) F Stollár	2	6	6
2	(Australia) A Rodionova	6	1	3
