= 2022 Challenger Banque Nationale de Saguenay =

Tennis tournament

- Date: 17–23 October 2022
- Edition: 15th
- Category: ITF Women's World Tennis Tour
- Prize money: $60,000
- Surface: Hard / Indoor
- Location: Saguenay, Quebec, Canada

Champions

Singles
- (India) Karman Thandi

Doubles
- (Netherlands) Arianne Hartono / (Australia) Olivia Tjandramulia
← 2019 ·	Challenger de Saguenay	· 2023 →

The 2022 Challenger Banque Nationale de Saguenay was a professional tennis tournament played on indoor hard courts. It was the fifteenth edition of the tournament which was part of the 2022 ITF Women's World Tennis Tour. It took place in Saguenay, Quebec, Canada between 17 and 23 October 2022.

== Champions ==
=== Singles ===
- (India) Karman Thandi def. (Canada) Katherine Sebov, 3–6, 6–4, 6–3

=== Doubles ===
- (Netherlands) Arianne Hartono / (Australia) Olivia Tjandramulia def. (United States) Catherine Harrison / (Belgium) Yanina Wickmayer, 5–7, 7–6^{(7–3)}, [10–8]

== Singles main draw entrants ==
=== Seeds ===
Country	Player	Rank^{1}	Seed
JPN	Moyuka Uchijima	113	1
USA	Robin Anderson	170	2
NED	Arianne Hartono	206	3
USA	Catherine Harrison	217	4
HKG	Eudice Chong	249	5
USA	Emina Bektas	251	6
SUI	Lulu Sun	253	7
USA	Francesca Di Lorenzo	258	8

- ^{1} Rankings are as of 10 October 2022.

=== Other entrants ===
The following players received wildcards into the singles main draw:

- (Canada) Cadence Brace
- (Canada) Jada Bui
- (Canada) Ana Grubor
- (Canada) Marina Stakusic

The following player received entry as a special exempt:

- (Canada) Stacey Fung

The following players received entry from the qualifying draw:

- (Poland) Weronika Baszak
- (Canada) Kayla Cross
- (United States) Raveena Kingsley
- (Mexico) María Fernanda Navarro
- (United States) Taylor Ng
- (Japan) Ena Shibahara
- (Denmark) Johanne Svendsen
- (United States) Amy Zhu
