= 2025 Challenger Banque Nationale de Saguenay – Doubles =

Doubles
- 2025 Challenger Banque Nationale de Saguenay

Final
- Champions: (Canada) Ariana Arseneault (Canada) Raphaëlle Lacasse
- Runners-up: (Netherlands) Jasmijn Gimbrère (United States) Anna Rogers
- Score: 5–7, 6–3, [10–5]

Events
Singles	Doubles
- Challenger de Saguenay

Ariana Arseneault and Raphaëlle Lacasse won the title, defeating Jasmijn Gimbrère and Anna Rogers in the final, 5–7, 6–3, [10–5].

Dalayna Hewitt and Rogers were the defending champions, but Hewitt chose to compete in Tyler instead.

== Seeds ==
1. (Netherlands) Jasmijn Gimbrère / (United States) Anna Rogers (final)
2. (Switzerland) Jenny Dürst / (United States) Jessica Failla (semifinals)
3. (Canada) Kayla Cross / (Slovakia) Viktória Hrunčáková (semifinals)
4. (Canada) Ariana Arseneault / (Canada) Raphaëlle Lacasse (champions)

== Draw ==
Key

- Q = Qualifier
- WC = Wild card
- LL = Lucky loser
- Alt = Alternate
- ITF = ITF entry
- PR = Protected ranking
- SR = Special ranking
- SE = Special exempt
- JE = Junior exempt
- JR = Junior Accelerator Programme entrant
- CO = College Accelerator Programme entrant
- NG = Next Gen Accelerator Program entrant
- w/o = Walkover
- r = Retired
- d = Defaulted

=== Draw ===
First round
1	(Netherlands) J Gimbrère (United States) A Rogers	2	6	[10]
(Denmark) E Kamper (Italy) CE Tiglea	6	3	[2]
(United Kingdom) E Adeshina (United Kingdom) V Allen	6	6
(Turkey) A Aksu (United States) D Ivanova	4	4
3	(Canada) K Cross (Slovakia) V Hrunčáková	6	6
(Japan) Y Kitahara (Japan) A Koshiishi	0	1
(United States) J McBride (United States) L Poling	3	6^{3}
(Canada) F Abanda (United States) S Vickery	6	7^{7}
(Haiti) L-S Alexis (Canada) CI Denysiewicz Slowek	1	1
(Canada) M Collard (Canada) A Vagramov	6	6
(United States) M Iyengar (Canada) N Lagaev	1	1
4	(Canada) A Arseneault (Canada) R Lacasse	6	6
(United States) K Collins (United Kingdom) A Rajecki	6	6
(Japan) H Arakawa (Japan) N Arakawa	4	2
(United States) A Sysoeva (United States) M Wojcik	0	4
2	(Switzerland) J Dürst (United States) J Failla	6	6

Quarterfinals
1	(Netherlands) J Gimbrère (United States) A Rogers	7	6
(United Kingdom) E Adeshina (United Kingdom) V Allen	5	4
3	(Canada) K Cross (Slovakia) V Hrunčáková	6	6
(Canada) F Abanda (United States) S Vickery	3	2
(Canada) M Collard (Canada) A Vagramov	5	6	[8]
4	(Canada) A Arseneault (Canada) R Lacasse	7	2	[10]
(United States) K Collins (United Kingdom) A Rajecki	5	3
2	(Switzerland) J Dürst (United States) J Failla	7	6

Semifinals
1	(Netherlands) J Gimbrère (United States) A Rogers	6	5	[13]
3	(Canada) K Cross (Slovakia) V Hrunčáková	4	7	[11]
4	(Canada) A Arseneault (Canada) R Lacasse	7^{7}	7
2	(Switzerland) J Dürst (United States) J Failla	6^{4}	5

Final
1	(Netherlands) J Gimbrère (United States) A Rogers	7	3	[5]
4	(Canada) A Arseneault (Canada) R Lacasse	5	6	[10]
