= 2024 Challenger Banque Nationale de Saguenay – Singles =

Singles
- 2024 Challenger Banque Nationale de Saguenay

Final
- Champion: (Croatia) Petra Marčinko
- Runner-up: (Netherlands) Anouk Koevermans
- Score: 6–3, 4–6, 7–6^{(7–3)}

Events
Singles	Doubles
← 2023 ·	Challenger de Saguenay	· 2025 →

Katherine Sebov was the defending champion, but lost in the second round to Petra Marčinko.

Marčinko went on to win the title, defeating Anouk Koevermans in the final, 6–3, 4–6, 7–6^{(7–3)}.

== Seeds ==
1. (Croatia) Lucija Ćirić Bagarić (first round)
2. (Lithuania) Justina Mikulskytė (second round)
3. (Czech Republic) Gabriela Knutson (second round)
4. (Netherlands) Anouk Koevermans (final)
5. (United States) Robin Anderson (first round)
6. (Canada) Katherine Sebov (second round)
7. (Slovakia) Viktória Hrunčáková (semifinals)
8. (Canada) Carson Branstine (second round)

== Draw ==
=== Key ===
- Q = Qualifier
- WC = Wild card
- LL = Lucky loser
- Alt = Alternate
- SE = Special exempt
- PR = Protected ranking
- ITF = ITF entry
- JE = Junior exempt
- w/o = Walkover
- r = Retired
- d = Defaulted
- SR = Special ranking

=== Finals ===
Semifinals
(Croatia) Petra Marčinko	7	7^{7}
7	(Slovakia) Viktória Hrunčáková	5	6^{5}
4	(Netherlands) Anouk Koevermans	7^{7}	6
(Sweden) Kajsa Rinaldo Persson	6^{1}	3

Final
(Croatia) Petra Marčinko	6	4	7^{7}
4	(Netherlands) Anouk Koevermans	3	6	6^{3}

=== Top half ===
First round
1	(Croatia) L Ćirić Bagarić	6	4	6^{6}
Q	(Japan) A Koshiishi	3	6	7^{8}
Q	(Netherlands) J Gimbrère	6	4	3
(Canada) S Fung	3	6	6
(Croatia) P Marčinko	7	6
(United States) D Hewitt	5	0
Q	(Japan) M Kawamura	2	4
6	(Canada) K Sebov	6	6
3	(Czech Republic) G Knutson	1	6	6
(Belgium) C Vlasselaer	6	3	4
WC	(Canada) E Dong	4	3
WC	(Canada) N Lagaev	6	6
WC	(Canada) A Grubor	4	2
SE	(United States) A Rogers	6	6
(United States) J Loeb	4	6^{3}
7	(Slovakia) V Hrunčáková	6	7^{7}

Second round
Q	(Japan) A Koshiishi	1	2
(Canada) S Fung	6	6
(Croatia) P Marčinko	6	6
6	(Canada) K Sebov	3	2
3	(Czech Republic) G Knutson	6	6^{4}	5
WC	(Canada) N Lagaev	3	7^{7}	7
SE	(United States) A Rogers	2	4
7	(Slovakia) V Hrunčáková	6	6

Quarterfinals
(Canada) S Fung	3	2
(Croatia) P Marčinko	6	6
WC	(Canada) N Lagaev	4	6	1
7	(Slovakia) V Hrunčáková	6	1	6

Semifinals
(Croatia) P Marčinko	7	7^{7}
7	(Slovakia) V Hrunčáková	5	6^{5}

=== Bottom half ===
First round
5	(United States) R Anderson	4	6	4
(Canada) C Brace	6	4	6
LL	(United States) P Corley	1	2
WC	(Canada) A Arseneault	6	6
Q	(Slovakia) V Morvayová	6	7
(Australia) K McPhee	1	5
Q	(United States) J Robinson	6^{4}	6^{4}
4	(Netherlands) A Koevermans	7^{7}	7^{7}
8	(Canada) C Branstine	6	6
Q	(Japan) R Okuwaki	2	1
(Sweden) K Rinaldo Persson	6	6
(Poland) U Radwańska	3	4
SR	(United Kingdom) T Moore	0^{r}
(Canada) K Cross	4
Q	(United States) S Daavettila	0	6	1
2	(Lithuania) J Mikulskytė	6	4	6

Second round
(Canada) C Brace	w/o
WC	(Canada) A Arseneault
Q	(Slovakia) V Morvayová	6^{3}	3
4	(Netherlands) A Koevermans	7^{7}	6
8	(Canada) C Branstine	6^{3}	2
(Sweden) K Rinaldo Persson	7^{7}	6
(Canada) K Cross	6	6
2	(Lithuania) J Mikulskytė	4	4

Quarterfinals
(Canada) C Brace	4	1
4	(Netherlands) A Koevermans	6	6
(Sweden) K Rinaldo Persson	6	6
(Canada) K Cross	2	1

Semifinals
4	(Netherlands) A Koevermans	7^{7}	6
(Sweden) K Rinaldo Persson	6^{1}	3
