= 2022 Challenger Banque Nationale de Saguenay – Singles =

Singles
- 2022 Challenger Banque Nationale de Saguenay

Final
- Champion: (India) Karman Thandi
- Runner-up: (Canada) Katherine Sebov
- Score: 3–6, 6–4, 6–3

Events
| Singles | Doubles |
| ← 2019 · | Challenger de Saguenay | · 2023 → |

Indy de Vroome was the defending champion but chose not to participate.

Karman Thandi won the title, defeating Katherine Sebov in the final, 3–6, 6–4, 6–3.

== Seeds ==
1. (Japan) Moyuka Uchijima (second round)
2. (United States) Robin Anderson (first round)
3. (Netherlands) Arianne Hartono (semifinals)
4. (United States) Catherine Harrison (quarterfinals)
5. (Hong Kong) Eudice Chong (quarterfinals)
6. (United States) Emina Bektas (first round)
7. (Switzerland) Lulu Sun (second round)
8. (United States) Francesca Di Lorenzo (semifinals)

== Draw ==
=== Key ===
- Q = Qualifier
- WC = Wild card
- LL = Lucky loser
- Alt = Alternate
- SE = Special exempt
- PR = Protected ranking
- ITF = ITF entry
- JE = Junior exempt
- w/o = Walkover
- r = Retired
- d = Defaulted
- SR = Special ranking

=== Finals ===
Semifinals
(Canada) Katherine Sebov | 6 | 3 | 6
3 | (Netherlands) Arianne Hartono | 4 | 6 | 3
8 | (United States) Francesca Di Lorenzo | 4 | 2
(India) Karman Thandi | 6 | 6

Final
(Canada) Katherine Sebov | 6 | 4 | 3
(India) Karman Thandi | 3 | 6 | 6

=== Top half ===
First round
1 | (Japan) M Uchijima | 1 | 7^{7} | 7^{7}
(Belgium) Y Wickmayer | 6 | 6^{4} | 6^{5}
(Canada) K Sebov | 6 | 6
Q | (Mexico) MF Navarro | 2 | 1
Q | (United States) A Zhu | 2 | 2
(Chinese Taipei) E-s Liang | 6 | 6
(Czech Republic) A Sisková | 5 | 1
5 | (Hong Kong) E Chong | 7 | 6
3 | (Netherlands) A Hartono | 6 | 6
Q | (United States) T Ng | 0 | 4
SE | (Canada) S Fung | 6^{4} | 3
WC | (Canada) C Brace | 7^{7} | 6
(United States) V Duval | 6 | 0 | 6
Q | (United States) R Kingsley | 2 | 6 | 4
WC | (Canada) M Stakusic | 6 | 6^{6} | 7^{7}
6 | (United States) E Bektas | 3 | 7^{8} | 6^{4}

Second round
1 | (Japan) M Uchijima | 3 | 6 | 3
(Canada) K Sebov | 6 | 1 | 6
(Chinese Taipei) E-s Liang | 6 | 2 | 0^{r}
5 | (Hong Kong) E Chong | 1 | 6 | 4
3 | (Netherlands) A Hartono | 6 | 6
WC | (Canada) C Brace | 2 | 1
(United States) V Duval | 0 | 6 | 1
WC | (Canada) M Stakusic | 6 | 3 | 6

Quarterfinals
(Canada) K Sebov | 6 | 6
5 | (Hong Kong) E Chong | 1 | 2
3 | (Netherlands) A Hartono | 6 | 6
WC | (Canada) M Stakusic | 1 | 2

Semifinals
(Canada) K Sebov | 6 | 3 | 6
3 | (Netherlands) A Hartono | 4 | 6 | 3

=== Bottom half ===
First round
8 | (United States) F Di Lorenzo | 4 | 6 | 6
(Slovakia) V Morvayová | 6 | 3 | 2
Q | (Canada) K Cross | 2 | 7^{7} | 2
(Australia) O Tjandramulia | 6 | 6^{3} | 6
(Czech Republic) M Bayerlová | 4 | 3
Q | (Denmark) J Svendsen | 6 | 6
WC | (Canada) A Grubor | 5 | 3
4 | (United States) C Harrison | 7 | 6
7 | (Switzerland) L Sun | 6 | 6^{7} | 6
WC | (Canada) J Bui | 1 | 7^{9} | 2
(Poland) U Radwańska | 4 | 7^{7} | 3
(United Kingdom) SB Grey | 6 | 6^{4} | 6
Q | (Poland) W Baszak | 4 | 6 | 2
Q | (Japan) E Shibahara | 6 | 4 | 6
(India) K Thandi | 6 | 6
2 | (United States) R Anderson | 4 | 2

Second round
8 | (United States) F Di Lorenzo | 6 | 7
(Australia) O Tjandramulia | 1 | 5
Q | (Denmark) J Svendsen | 2 | 3
4 | (United States) C Harrison | 6 | 6
7 | (Switzerland) L Sun | 5 | 6 | 4
(United Kingdom) SB Grey | 7 | 1 | 6
Q | (Japan) E Shibahara | 2 | 4
(India) K Thandi | 6 | 6

Quarterfinals
8 | (United States) F Di Lorenzo | 2 | 7^{7} | 7^{7}
4 | (United States) C Harrison | 6 | 6^{5} | 6^{5}
(United Kingdom) SB Grey | 2 | 1
(India) K Thandi | 6 | 6

Semifinals
8 | (United States) F Di Lorenzo | 4 | 2
(India) K Thandi | 6 | 6
