= 2022 Challenger Banque Nationale de Saguenay – Doubles =

Doubles
- 2022 Challenger Banque Nationale de Saguenay

Final
- Champions: (Netherlands) Arianne Hartono (Australia) Olivia Tjandramulia
- Runners-up: (United States) Catherine Harrison (Belgium) Yanina Wickmayer
- Score: 5–7, 7–6^{(7–3)}, [10–8]

Events
Singles	Doubles
← 2019 ·	Challenger de Saguenay	· 2023 →

Mélodie Collard and Leylah Fernandez were the defending champions but both players chose not to participate.

Arianne Hartono and Olivia Tjandramulia won the title, defeating Catherine Harrison and Yanina Wickmayer in the final, 5–7, 7–6^{(7–3)}, [10–8].

== Seeds ==
1. (United States) Catherine Harrison / (Belgium) Yanina Wickmayer (final)
2. (Netherlands) Arianne Hartono / (Australia) Olivia Tjandramulia (champions)
3. (Hong Kong) Eudice Chong / (Japan) Moyuka Uchijima (quarterfinals)
4. (Chinese Taipei) Liang En-shuo / (Czech Republic) Anna Sisková (semifinals)

== Draw ==
=== Key ===
- Q = Qualifier
- WC = Wild card
- LL = Lucky loser
- Alt = Alternate
- SE = Special exempt
- PR = Protected ranking
- ITF = ITF entry
- JE = Junior exempt
- w/o = Walkover
- r = Retired
- d = Defaulted
- SR = Special ranking

=== Draw ===
First round
1	(United States) C Harrison (Belgium) Y Wickmayer	6	7^{7}
(Mexico) MF Navarro (United States) K Shaffer	3	6^{3}
(Australia) E Bolton (United States) F Di Lorenzo	7^{7}	6
WC	(Canada) C Mercier (Canada) N Rahimkhani	6^{3}	1
3	(Hong Kong) E Chong (Japan) M Uchijima	6	6
(Canada) L Kwong (United States) A Ulyashchenko	2	3
Alt	(United States) S Atturu (United States) B Collens	2	0
(United Kingdom) SB Grey (Canada) K Sebov	6	6
(United States) S León (Japan) E Shibahara	4	6	[10]
(Canada) S Fung (Slovakia) A Rusová	6	1	[5]
WC	(Canada) R Leroux (Canada) A Xie	6^{3}	0
4	(Chinese Taipei) E-s Liang (Czech Republic) A Sisková	7^{7}	6
(Serbia) K Jokić (United States) T Ng	7^{9}	6
(Canada) K Cross (Denmark) J Svendsen	6^{7}	2
(Czech Republic) M Bayerlová (United States) A Zhu	6^{4}	3
2	(Netherlands) A Hartono (Australia) O Tjandramulia	7^{7}	6

Quarterfinals
1	(United States) C Harrison (Belgium) Y Wickmayer	6	6
(Australia) E Bolton (United States) F Di Lorenzo	2	4
3	(Hong Kong) E Chong (Japan) M Uchijima	6	6^{5}	[8]
(United Kingdom) SB Grey (Canada) K Sebov	1	7^{7}	[10]
(United States) S León (Japan) E Shibahara	2	2
4	(Chinese Taipei) E-s Liang (Czech Republic) A Sisková	6	6
(Serbia) K Jokić (United States) T Ng	4	1
2	(Netherlands) A Hartono (Australia) O Tjandramulia	6	6

Semifinals
1	(United States) C Harrison (Belgium) Y Wickmayer	6	4	[10]
(United Kingdom) SB Grey (Canada) K Sebov	3	6	[8]
4	(Chinese Taipei) E-s Liang (Czech Republic) A Sisková	7^{7}	2	[5]
2	(Netherlands) A Hartono (Australia) O Tjandramulia	6^{2}	6	[10]

Final
1	(United States) C Harrison (Belgium) Y Wickmayer	7	6^{3}	[8]
2	(Netherlands) A Hartono (Australia) O Tjandramulia	5	7^{7}	[10]
