= 2025 Challenger Banque Nationale de Saguenay – Singles =

Singles
- 2025 Challenger Banque Nationale de Saguenay

Final
- Champion: Anastasia Tikhonova
- Runner-up: (Slovakia) Viktória Hrunčáková
- Score: 6–3, 6–2

Events
Singles	Doubles
← 2024 ·	Challenger de Saguenay	· 2026 →

Petra Marčinko was the defending champion, but chose to compete in Tyler instead.

Anastasia Tikhonova won the title, defeating Viktória Hrunčáková in the final, 6–3, 6–2.

== Seeds ==
1. (Canada) Kayla Cross (second round)
2. (Slovakia) Viktória Hrunčáková (final)
3. (United States) Anna Rogers (semifinals)
4. Anastasia Tikhonova (champion)
5. (Turkey) Ayla Aksu (second round)
6. (Switzerland) Jenny Dürst (second round)
7. (United Kingdom) Amelia Rajecki (second round)
8. (Japan) Ayumi Koshiishi (quarterfinals)

== Draw ==
=== Key ===
- Q = Qualifier
- WC = Wild card
- LL = Lucky loser
- Alt = Alternate
- ITF = ITF entry
- PR = Protected ranking
- SR = Special ranking
- SE = Special exempt
- JE = Junior exempt
- JR = Junior Accelerator Programme entrant
- CO = College Accelerator Programme entrant
- NG = Next Gen Accelerator Program entrant
- w/o = Walkover
- r = Retired
- d = Defaulted

=== Finals ===
Semifinals
(Japan) Yuno Kitahara	1	0
4	Anastasia Tikhonova	6	6
3	(United States) Anna Rogers	2	6	2
2	(Slovakia) Viktória Hrunčáková	6	4	6

Final
4	Anastasia Tikhonova	6	6
2	(Slovakia) Viktória Hrunčáková	3	2

=== Top half ===
First round
1	(Canada) K Cross	6	6
(Netherlands) J Gimbrère	3	1
Q	(Slovakia) I Balus	6	6^{3}	6
(United States) J Failla	4	7^{7}	2
(Japan) Y Kitahara	6	6
WC	(Canada) R Lacasse	1	4
(Japan) H Arakawa	1	4
7	(United Kingdom) A Rajecki	6	6
4	A Tikhonova	6	6
(United States) D Ivanova	1	2
Q	(United States) A Sysoeva	6	7
Q	(Sweden) J Saner	3	5
SR	(United States) A Markham	6	6
(United States) S Vickery	4	3
Q	(United States) K Collins	5	3
6	(Switzerland) J Dürst	7	6

Second round
1	(Canada) K Cross	2	6	3
Q	(Slovakia) I Balus	6	2	6
(Japan) Y Kitahara	2	6	6
7	(United Kingdom) A Rajecki	6	4	4
4	A Tikhonova	6	6
Q	(United States) A Sysoeva	0	2
SR	(United States) A Markham	6	4	7
6	(Switzerland) J Dürst	3	6	5

Quarterfinals
Q	(Slovakia) I Balus	6	4	5
(Japan) Y Kitahara	2	6	7
4	A Tikhonova	6	6
SR	(United States) A Markham	1	2

Semifinals
(Japan) Y Kitahara	1	0
4	A Tikhonova	6	6

=== Bottom half ===
First round
8	(Japan) A Koshiishi	6	3	6
WC	(Canada) A Vagramov	4	6	3
Q	(United States) A Reami	4	2
WC	(Canada) T Chavez	6	6
(United Kingdom) V Allen	6	6
(United Kingdom) E Adeshina	4	2
Q	(United States) M Iyengar	2	2
3	(United States) A Rogers	6	6
5	(Turkey) A Aksu	6	5	7^{10}
(Canada) A Arseneault	3	7	6^{8}
(Germany) C Kuhl	6	3	6
Q	(United States) L Poling	1	6	1
(Belgium) C Vlasselaer	3	6	1
WC	(Canada) N Lagaev	6	3	6
Q	(Canada) A Alexander	0	7^{7}	2
2	(Slovakia) V Hrunčáková	6	6^{3}	6

Second round
8	(Japan) A Koshiishi	7^{7}	2	6
WC	(Canada) T Chavez	6^{5}	6	2
(United Kingdom) V Allen	6^{1}	6	6^{10}
3	(United States) A Rogers	7^{7}	4	7^{12}
5	(Turkey) A Aksu	3	7	5
(Germany) C Kuhl	6	5	7
WC	(Canada) N Lagaev	4	3
2	(Slovakia) V Hrunčáková	6	6

Quarterfinals
8	(Japan) A Koshiishi	2	4
3	(United States) A Rogers	6	6
(Germany) C Kuhl	4	2
2	(Slovakia) V Hrunčáková	6	6

Semifinals
3	(United States) A Rogers	2	6	2
2	(Slovakia) V Hrunčáková	6	4	6
