= 2017 Challenger Banque Nationale de Saguenay =

- Date: October 23–29
- Edition: 12th
- Category: ITF Women's Circuit
- Prize money: US$60,000
- Surface: Hard – indoors
- Location: Saguenay, Quebec, Canada
- Venue: Club de tennis intérieur Saguenay

Champions

Singles
- (Hungary) Gréta Arn

Doubles
- (Canada) Bianca Andreescu / (Canada) Carol Zhao
- Challenger de Saguenay

The 2017 Challenger Banque Nationale de Saguenay was a professional tennis tournament played on indoor hard courts. It was the 12th edition of the tournament and part of the 2017 ITF Women's Circuit, offering a total of $60,000 in prize money. It took place in Saguenay, Quebec, Canada between October 23 and October 29, 2017.

== Singles main-draw entrants ==
=== Seeds ===
Country	Player	Rank^{1}	Seed
JPN	Risa Ozaki	97	1
CAN	Bianca Andreescu	154	2
NED	Bibiane Schoofs	229	3
CAN	Carol Zhao	233	4
MEX	Victoria Rodríguez	243	5
USA	Emina Bektas	245	6
SUI	Amra Sadiković	259	7
BEL	Ysaline Bonaventure	271	8

- ^{1} Rankings are as of October 16, 2017

=== Other entrants ===
The following players received wildcards into the singles main draw:

- (Canada) Isabelle Boulais
- (Canada) Leylah Annie Fernandez
- (Canada) Catherine Leduc
- (Canada) Charlotte Robillard-Millette

The following player entered the singles main draw with a protected ranking:

- (Belgium) Ysaline Bonaventure

The following players received entry from the qualifying draw:

- (Russia) Elena Bovina
- (United States) Quinn Gleason
- (United States) Alexandra Stevenson
- (China) Xu Shilin

== Champions ==
=== Singles ===
- (Hungary) Gréta Arn def. (Netherlands) Bibiane Schoofs, 6–1, 6–2

=== Doubles ===
- (Canada) Bianca Andreescu / (Canada) Carol Zhao def. (United States) Francesca Di Lorenzo / (New Zealand) Erin Routliffe by walkover
