= 2024 Challenger Banque Nationale de Saguenay – Doubles =

Doubles
- 2024 Challenger Banque Nationale de Saguenay

Final
- Champions: (United States) Dalayna Hewitt (United States) Anna Rogers
- Runners-up: (Belgium) Magali Kempen (Belgium) Lara Salden
- Score: 6–1, 7–5

Events
Singles	Doubles
← 2023 ·	Challenger de Saguenay	· 2025 →

Robin Anderson and Dalayna Hewitt were the defending champions, but they chose to play with different partners. Anderson partnered with Tara Moore, but lost in the quarterfinals to Hewitt and Anna Rogers.

Hewitt and Rogers went on to win the title, defeating Magali Kempen and Lara Salden in the final, 6–1, 7–5.

== Seeds ==
1. (Belgium) Magali Kempen / (Belgium) Lara Salden (final)
2. (United States) Dalayna Hewitt / (United States) Anna Rogers (champions)
3. (Canada) Ariana Arseneault / (Canada) Kayla Cross (semifinals, withdrew)
4. (Lithuania) Justina Mikulskytė / (United States) Christina Rosca (semifinals)

== Draw ==
=== Key ===
- Q = Qualifier
- WC = Wild card
- LL = Lucky loser
- Alt = Alternate
- SE = Special exempt
- PR = Protected ranking
- ITF = ITF entry
- JE = Junior exempt
- w/o = Walkover
- r = Retired
- d = Defaulted
- SR = Special ranking

=== Draw ===
First round
1	(Belgium) M Kempen (Belgium) L Salden	7	6
(Canada) Z Chulak (Canada) A Malysheva	5	1
(France) J Belgraver (Netherlands) J Gimbrère	6	6
(Canada) E Dong (Canada) N Lagaev	1	2
4	(Lithuania) J Mikulskytė (United States) C Rosca	6	5	[10]
(United States) C Campana (United States) S Daavettila	0	7	[7]
(Canada) C Brace (United States) P Corley	1	6	[5]
(Japan) M Ayukawa (Japan) M Kawamura	6	4	[10]
(Japan) A Koshiishi (Japan) R Okuwaki	7	6
(Haiti) L-S Alexis (Canada) GV Lindgren	5	1
(Slovakia) V Hrunčáková (Czech Republic) G Knutson	7	6^{6}	[8]
3	(Canada) A Arseneault (Canada) K Cross	5	7^{8}	[10]
(Slovakia) V Morvayová (Netherlands) D Tran	3	7	[5]
(United States) R Anderson (United Kingdom) T Moore	6	5	[10]
(United States) S Alicea (Canada) R Lacasse	3	6^{2}
2	(United States) D Hewitt (United States) A Rogers	6	7^{7}

Quarterfinals
1	(Belgium) M Kempen (Belgium) L Salden	6	7
(France) J Belgraver (Netherlands) J Gimbrère	4	5
4	(Lithuania) J Mikulskytė (United States) C Rosca	6	3	[10]
(Japan) M Ayukawa (Japan) M Kawamura	2	6	[6]
(Japan) A Koshiishi (Japan) R Okuwaki	2	2
3	(Canada) A Arseneault (Canada) K Cross	6	6
(United States) R Anderson (United Kingdom) T Moore	6^{10}	1
2	(United States) D Hewitt (United States) A Rogers	7^{12}	6

Semifinals
1	(Belgium) M Kempen (Belgium) L Salden	2	7	[10]
4	(Lithuania) J Mikulskytė (United States) C Rosca	6	5	[3]
3	(Canada) A Arseneault (Canada) K Cross
2	(United States) D Hewitt (United States) A Rogers	w/o

Final
1	(Belgium) M Kempen (Belgium) L Salden	1	5
2	(United States) D Hewitt (United States) A Rogers	6	7
