= 2017 Challenger Banque Nationale de Saguenay – Singles =

Singles
- 2017 Challenger Banque Nationale de Saguenay

Final
- Champion: (Hungary) Gréta Arn
- Runner-up: (Netherlands) Bibiane Schoofs
- Score: 6–1, 6–2

Events
Singles	Doubles
- Challenger de Saguenay

Catherine Bellis was the defending champion, but decided not to participate this year.

Gréta Arn won the title, defeating Bibiane Schoofs 6–1, 6–2 in the final.

== Seeds ==
1. (Japan) Risa Ozaki (first round)
2. (Canada) Bianca Andreescu (first round)
3. (Netherlands) Bibiane Schoofs (final)
4. (Canada) Carol Zhao (quarterfinals)
5. (Mexico) Victoria Rodríguez (first round)
6. (United States) Emina Bektas (first round)
7. (Switzerland) Amra Sadiković (first round)
8. (Belgium) Ysaline Bonaventure (first round)

== Draw ==
Key

- Q = Qualifier
- WC = Wild card
- LL = Lucky loser
- Alt = Alternate
- ITF = ITF entry
- PR = Protected ranking
- SR = Special ranking
- SE = Special exempt
- JE = Junior exempt
- JR = Junior Accelerator Programme entrant
- CO = College Accelerator Programme entrant
- NG = Next Gen Accelerator Program entrant
- w/o = Walkover
- r = Retired
- d = Defaulted

=== Finals ===
Semifinals
(France) Jessika Ponchet	7^{7}	5	3
3	(Netherlands) Bibiane Schoofs	6^{3}	7	6
(Hungary) Gréta Arn	6	6
Q	(China) Xu Shilin	1	4

Final
3	(Netherlands) Bibiane Schoofs	1	2
(Hungary) Gréta Arn	6	6

=== Top half ===
First round
1	(Japan) R Ozaki	3	3
(United States) F Di Lorenzo	6	6
(United Kingdom) T Moore	6	6
(United States) R Anderson	4	3
Q	(United States) Q Gleason	4	3
(France) J Ponchet	6	6
(Belgium) K Zimmermann	6	6^{6}	6
5	(Mexico) V Rodríguez	3	7^{8}	4
3	(Netherlands) B Schoofs	6	6
(Serbia) J Jakšić	4	3
(United States) M Sanchez	3	6	6
(Chile) A Guarachi	6	2	1
WC	(Canada) C Robillard-Millette	6	6
(Chinese Taipei) C-y Hsu	4	2
(Slovakia) M Hončová	6	6
7	(Switzerland) A Sadiković	4	3

Second round
(United States) F Di Lorenzo	6	6
(United Kingdom) T Moore	2	4
(France) J Ponchet	6	6
(Belgium) K Zimmermann	0	3
3	(Netherlands) B Schoofs	3	6	7^{8}
(United States) M Sanchez	6	3	6^{6}
WC	(Canada) C Robillard-Millette	6	7
(Slovakia) M Hončová	3	5

Quarterfinals
(United States) F Di Lorenzo	3	4
(France) J Ponchet	6	6
3	(Netherlands) B Schoofs	3	7^{7}	6
WC	(Canada) C Robillard-Millette	6	6^{1}	2

Semifinals
(France) J Ponchet	7^{7}	5	3
3	(Netherlands) B Schoofs	6^{3}	7	6

=== Bottom half ===
First round
6	(United States) E Bektas	7	3	1
(United States) J Elbaba	5	6	6
(Germany) S-R Sekulic	3	0
(Hungary) G Arn	6	6
WC	(Canada) C Leduc	3	2
(Belgium) A-S Mestach	6	6
Q	(Russia) E Bovina	6	3	6^{3}
4	(Canada) C Zhao	1	6	7^{7}
8/PR	(Belgium) Y Bonaventure	7^{7}	4	5
(United States) M Mateas	6^{5}	6	7
WC	(Canada) LA Fernandez	7	6
WC	(Canada) I Boulais	5	2
Q	(United States) A Stevenson	6	4	6
(United States) R Yurovsky	3	6	2
Q	(China) S Xu	7	0	7^{7}
2	(Canada) B Andreescu	5	6	6^{3}

Second round
(United States) J Elbaba	0	4
(Hungary) G Arn	6	6
(Belgium) A-S Mestach	4	2
4	(Canada) C Zhao	6	6
(United States) M Mateas	1	4
WC	(Canada) LA Fernandez	6	6
Q	(United States) A Stevenson	0	3
Q	(China) S Xu	6	6

Quarterfinals
(Hungary) G Arn	6	6
4	(Canada) C Zhao	0	1
WC	(Canada) LA Fernandez	5	4
Q	(China) S Xu	7	6

Semifinals
(Hungary) G Arn	6	6
Q	(China) S Xu	1	4
