= 2024 Dow Tennis Classic – Doubles =

Doubles
- 2024 Dow Tennis Classic

Final
- Champions: (United Kingdom) Emily Appleton (United Kingdom) Maia Lumsden
- Runners-up: (Canada) Ariana Arseneault (Canada) Mia Kupres
- Score: 6–2, 4–6, [10–5]

Events
| Singles | Doubles |
| ← 2023 · | Dow Tennis Classic | · 2025 → |

Hailey Baptiste and Whitney Osuigwe were the defending champions but lost to second seeded British pairing, Emily Appleton and Maia Lumsden in the semifinals.

Appleton and Lumsden went on to win the title, defeating Ariana Arseneault and Mia Kupres 6–2, 4–6, [10–5] in the final. This was Appleton's first WTA 125 title and Lumsden's second.

== Seeds ==
1. (Poland) Katarzyna Kawa / (United States) Sabrina Santamaria (quarterfinals)
2. (United Kingdom) Emily Appleton / (United Kingdom) Maia Lumsden (champions)
3. (United States) Hailey Baptiste / (United States) Whitney Osuigwe (semifinals)
4. (United States) Carmen Corley / (United States) Quinn Gleason (quarterfinals)

== Draw ==
Key

- Q = Qualifier
- WC = Wild card
- LL = Lucky loser
- Alt = Alternate
- ITF = ITF entry
- PR = Protected ranking
- SR = Special ranking
- SE = Special exempt
- JE = Junior exempt
- JR = Junior Accelerator Programme entrant
- CO = College Accelerator Programme entrant
- NG = Next Gen Accelerator Program entrant
- w/o = Walkover
- r = Retired
- d = Defaulted

=== Draw ===
First round
(Canada) A Arseneault (Canada) M Kupres | 7 | 6
(United States) J Loeb (United States) C Rosca | 5 | 1
4 | (United States) C Corley (United States) Q Gleason | 6 | 6
WC | (United States) E Coleman (United States) K Miller | 4 | 4
(Australia) M Joint (Australia) A Sharma | 6 | 3 | [4]
(United States) M Mateas (United States) A Parks | 2 | 6 | [10]
A Korneeva; P Kudermetova | 7^{7} | 6
(Canada) R Marino (United Kingdom) T Moore | 6^{4} | 3
(United States) R Anderson (United States) A Smith | 3 | 6^{3}
3 | (United States) H Baptiste (United States) W Osuigwe | 6 | 7^{7}
(United States) S Chang (United States) R McAdoo | 7^{8} | 7^{7}
(India) P Thombare; A Tikhonova | 6^{6} | 6^{5}
(Switzerland) L Küng (Australia) A Osborne | 2 | 4
2 | (United Kingdom) E Appleton (United Kingdom) M Lumsden | 6 | 6

Quarterfinals
1 | (Poland) K Kawa (United States) S Santamaria | 2 | 2
(Canada) A Arseneault (Canada) M Kupres | 6 | 6
4 | (United States) C Corley (United States) Q Gleason | 4 | 6 | [7]
(United States) M Mateas (United States) A Parks | 6 | 3 | [10]
A Korneeva; P Kudermetova | 3 | 6^{4}
3 | (United States) H Baptiste (United States) W Osuigwe | 6 | 7^{7}
(United States) S Chang (United States) R McAdoo | 4 | 4
2 | (United Kingdom) E Appleton (United Kingdom) M Lumsden | 6 | 6

Semifinals
(Canada) A Arseneault (Canada) M Kupres | 6 | 6
(United States) M Mateas (United States) A Parks | 4 | 3
3 | (United States) H Baptiste (United States) W Osuigwe | 6^{7} | 2
2 | (United Kingdom) E Appleton (United Kingdom) M Lumsden | 7^{9} | 6

Final
(Canada) A Arseneault (Canada) M Kupres | 2 | 6 | [5]
2 | (United Kingdom) E Appleton (United Kingdom) M Lumsden | 6 | 4 | [10]
