= Emily Appleton (tennis) =

British tennis player (born 1999)

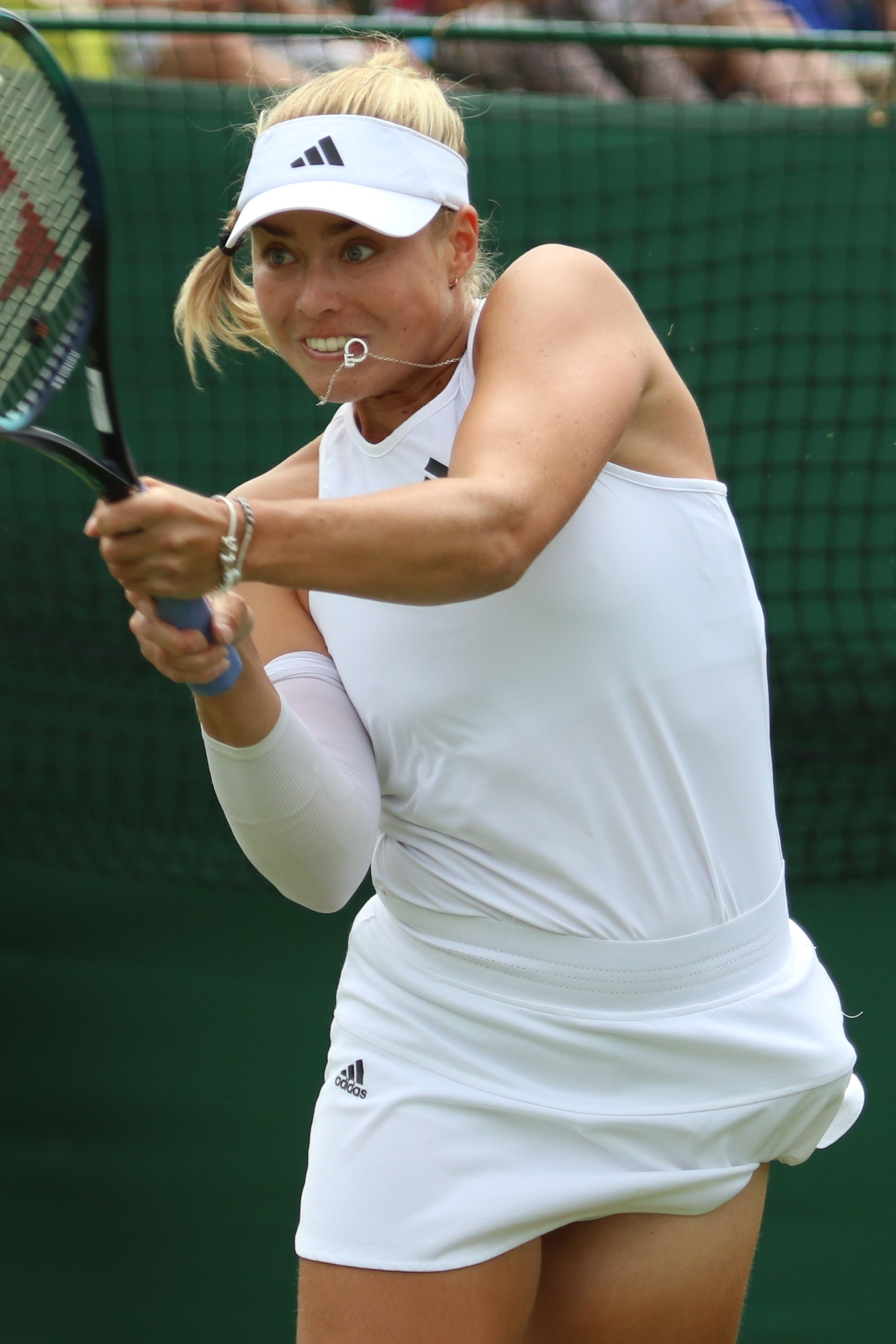
- Appleton at the 2023 Wimbledon Championships
- Country (sports): Great Britain
- Born: 1 September 1999 (age 27) Chertsey, Surrey
- Plays: Right-handed
- Coach: David Collins
- Prize money: $411,014

Singles
- Career record: 252–239
- Career titles: 4 ITF
- Highest ranking: No. 347 (6 October 2025)
- Current ranking: No. 428 (14 September 2026)

Grand Slam singles results
- Wimbledon: Q3 (2025)

Doubles
- Career record: 314–218
- Career titles: 1 WTA 125, 22 ITF
- Highest ranking: No. 77 (15 September 2025)
- Current ranking: No. 172 (14 September 2026)

Grand Slam doubles results
- French Open: 1R (2025)
- Wimbledon: 2R (2024)

Grand Slam mixed doubles results
- Wimbledon: 1R (2024, 2025, 2026)
- Last updated on: 16 September 2026.

Emily Appleton (born 1 September 1999) is a British tennis player. She has career-high rankings by the WTA of No. 347 in singles, reached on 6 October 2025 and No. 77 in doubles, achieved on 15 September 2025.

== Career ==
Appleton made her WTA Tour main-draw debut in doubles at the 2022 Birmingham Classic, partnering with Ali Collins.In June 2023, she qualified for the Nottingham Open for her singles main-draw debut. She lost to British No. 1, Katie Boulter.

Partnering with Lily Miyazaki after being given a wildcard entry, Appleton reached the second round in the doubles at Wimbledon in 2024, defeating Wang Xiyu and Zhu Lin in a deciding set tie-break in the first round, before bowing out against top seeds Elise Mertens and Hsieh Su-wei in round two.

Alongside Maia Lumsden, she won her first WTA 125 title at the 2024 Dow Tennis Classic, defeating Ariana Arseneault and Mia Kupres in the final which went to a deciding champions tiebreak.

Partnering with Yvonne Cavallé Reimers, she made her French Open debut in May 2025, losing in the first round to Alexandra Eala and Renata Zarazúa.

== Performance timelines ==
Key
W	F	SF	QF	#R	RR	Q#	DNQ	A	NH

(W) winner; (F) finalist; (SF) semifinalist; (QF) quarterfinalist; (#R) rounds 4, 3, 2, 1; (RR) round-robin stage; (Q#) qualification round; (DNQ) did not qualify; (A) absent; (NH) not held; (SR) strike rate (events won / competed); (W–L) win–loss record.
To avoid confusion and double counting, these charts are updated at the conclusion of a tournament or when the player's participation has ended.

== WTA 125 finals ==
=== Doubles: 3 (1 title, 2 runner-ups) ===
Result	W–L	Date	Tournament	Surface	Partner	Opponents	Score
Win	1–0	Nov 2024	Midland Classic, United States	Hard (i)	(United Kingdom) Maia Lumsden	(Canada) Ariana Arseneault (Canada) Mia Kupres	6–2, 4–6, [10–5]
Loss	1–1	Jul 2025	Contrexéville Open, France	Clay	(Netherlands) Isabelle Haverlag	(United States) Quinn Gleason (Brazil) Ingrid Martins	1–6, 6–7^{(4–7)}
Loss	1–2	Feb 2026	Oeiras Indoors, Portugal	Hard (i)	(Japan) Makoto Ninomiya	(United States) Carmen Corley (United States) Ivana Corley	6–2, 0–6, [4–10]

== ITF Circuit finals ==
=== Singles: 12 (4 titles, 8 runner-ups) ===
Legend W60 tournaments W25/35 tournaments (1–3) W15 tournaments (3–5)	Finals by surface Hard (3–7) Clay (0–1) Carpet (1–0)

Result	W–L	Date	Tournament	Tier	Surface	Opponent	Score
Loss	0–1	Nov 2017	ITF Pereira, Colombia	W15	Clay	(Colombia) María Herazo González	5–7, 5–7
Loss	0–2	Jan 2018	ITF Fort-de-France, Martinique	W15	Hard	(Switzerland) Leonie Küng	4–6, 6–2, 4–6
Win	1–2	Aug 2018	ITF Dublin, Ireland	W15	Carpet	(United Kingdom) Sasha Hill	6–4, 6–3
Win	2–2	Aug 2018	ITF Gimcheon, South Korea	W15	Hard	(South Korea) Ahn Yu-jin	6–4, 3–6, 6–2
Loss	2–3	Mar 2019	ITF Cancún, Mexico	W15	Hard	(Paraguay) Montserrat González	7–6^{(2)}, 1–6, 3–6
Loss	2–4	Apr 2019	ITF Cancún, Mexico	W15	Hard	(Japan) Natsumi Kawaguchi	6–7^{(2)}, 7–6^{(2)}, 3–6
Win	3–4	Oct 2022	GB Pro-Series Loughborough, United Kingdom	W25	Hard (i)	(Uzbekistan) Nigina Abduraimova	6–4, 6–4
Loss	3–5	Jan 2025	ITF Esch-sur-Alzette, Luxembourg	W35	Hard (i)	(Germany) Anna-Lena Friedsam	6–3, 0–6, 5–7
Win	4–5	Mar 2025	ITF Trois-Rivières, Canada	W15	Hard (i)	(United States) Malaika Rapolu	6–3, 3–6, 6–3
Loss	4–6	Mar 2025	ITF Montreal, Canada	W15	Hard (i)	(United States) Christasha McNeil	4–6, 4–6
Loss	4–7	May 2026	ITF Nottingham, UK	W35	Hard	(United Kingdom) Lily Miyazaki	3–6, 3–6
Loss	4–8	May 2026	ITF Nottingham, UK	W35	Hard	(United Kingdom) Alicia Dudeney	3–6, 5–7

=== Doubles: 52 (22 titles, 30 runner-ups) ===
Legend W100 tournaments (0–1) W60/75 tournaments (7–5) W40/50 tournaments (1–3) W25/35 tournaments (4–9) W10/15 tournaments (10–12)	Finals by surface Hard (10–18) Clay (11–9) Carpet (1–3)

Result	W–L	Date	Tournament	Tier	Surface	Partner	Opponents	Score
Loss	0–1	Aug 2016	ITF Cali, Colombia	W10	Clay	(Hungary) Naomi Totka	(Chile) Fernanda Brito (Paraguay) Camila Giangreco Campiz	1–6, 4–6
Loss	0–2	Jul 2017	ITF Dublin, Ireland	W15	Carpet	(United States) Quinn Gleason	(Italy) Giorgia Marchetti (Netherlands) Rosalie van der Hoek	5–7, 4–6
Win	1–2	Sep 2017	ITF Buenos Aires, Argentina	W15	Clay	(Argentina) María Carlé	(Argentina) Julieta Estable (Argentina) Melina Ferrero	6–3, 6–1
Win	2–2	Oct 2017	ITF Hilton Head, United States	W15	Clay	(United States) Caty McNally	(United States) Kylie Collins (United States) Meg Kowalski	7–5, 6–3
Win	3–2	Nov 2017	ITF Pereira, Colombia	W15	Clay	(Colombia) María Herazo González	(The Bahamas) Kerrie Cartwright (United States) Kariann Pierre-Louis	7–5, 2–6, [10–7]
Win	4–2	Nov 2017	ITF Cúcuta, Colombia	W15	Clay	(Mexico) María Portillo Ramírez	(Colombia) Sofía Múnera Sánchez (Bolivia) Noelia Zeballos	6–3, 7–6^{(2)}
Loss	4–3	Dec 2017	ITF Manta, Ecuador	W15	Hard	(Colombia) María Herazo González	(Mexico) María Portillo Ramírez (United States) Sofia Sewing	1–6, 3–6
Loss	4–4	Jan 2018	ITF Fort-de-France, Martinique	W15	Hard	(United States) Caty McNally	(United States) Rasheeda McAdoo (United States) Amy Zhu	5–7, 6–7^{(5)}
Win	5–4	Jan 2018	ITF Petit-Bourg, Guadeloupe	W15	Hard	(United States) Caty McNally	(United States) Shelby Talcott (United States) Amy Zhu	6–3, 6–0
Win	6–4	Feb 2018	ITF Solarino, Italy	W15	Carpet	(United States) Quinn Gleason	(France) Mathilde Armitano (Italy) Maria Masini	3–6, 7–5, [10–8]
Loss	6–5	Mar 2018	ITF Heraklion, Greece	W15	Clay	(Finland) Mia Eklund	(Denmark) Emilie Francati (Denmark) Maria Jespersen	5–7, 6–4, [8–10]
Win	7–5	May 2018	ITF Tacarigua, Trinidad and Tobago	W15	Hard	(Mexico) María Portillo Ramírez	(The Bahamas) Kerrie Cartwright (United States) Kariann Pierre-Louis	6–4, 6–3
Win	8–5	Jul 2018	ITF Den Haag, Netherlands	W15	Clay	(Sweden) Ida Jarlskog	(United States) Dasha Ivanova (Germany) Julyette Steur	6–4, 6–0
Loss	8–6	Jul 2018	ITF Amstelveen, Netherlands	W15	Clay	(United States) Dasha Ivanova	(Austria) Marlies Szupper (Netherlands) Eva Vedder	3–6, 4–6
Loss	8–7	Aug 2018	ITF Dublin, Ireland	W15	Carpet	(Germany) Lisa Ponomar	(Romania) Karola Bejenaru (Germany) Julia Kimmelmann	3–6, 6–2, [7–10]
Loss	8–8	Aug 2018	ITF Gimcheon, South Korea	W15	Hard	(Chinese Taipei) Joanna Garland	(South Korea) Jung So-hee (South Korea) Kim Mi-ok	7–6^{(5)}, 6–7^{(5)}, [12–14]
Loss	8–9	Jan 2019	ITF Fort-de-France, Martinique	W15	Hard	(United States) Dalayna Hewitt	(Greece) Eleni Kordolaimi (France) Alice Tubello	3–6, 7–5, [4–10]
Win	9–9	Mar 2019	ITF Cancún, Mexico	W15	Hard	(Mexico) María Portillo Ramírez	(United States) Dasha Ivanova (Moldova) Alexandra Perper	7–6^{(4)}, 6–4
Loss	9–10	Apr 2019	ITF Cancún, Mexico	W15	Hard	(Mexico) María Portillo Ramírez	(Japan) Natsumi Kawaguchi (Israel) Maya Tahan	1–6, 2–6
Loss	9–11	May 2019	ITF Singapore	W25	Hard	(United States) Catherine Harrison	(New Zealand) Paige Hourigan (Indonesia) Aldila Sutjiadi	1–6, 6–7^{(5)}
Loss	9–12	Oct 2019	ITF Andrézieux-Bouthéon, France	W15	Hard	(Japan) Yuriko Miyazaki	(Italy) Valentina Losciale (France) Carla Touly	5–7, 3–6
Loss	9–13	Oct 2019	ITF Dallas, United States	W25	Hard	(United States) Jamie Loeb	(Australia) Olivia Tjandramulia (Mexico) Marcela Zacarías	3–6, 4–6
Loss	9–14	Nov 2020	ITF Haabneeme, Estonia	W15	Hard	(Poland) Martyna Kubka	(Lithuania) Justina Mikulskytė (Netherlands) Lexie Stevens	2–6, 1–6
Win	10–14	May 2021	ITF Jerusalem, Israel	W15	Hard	(United Kingdom) Alicia Barnett	(Switzerland) Jenny Dürst (Switzerland) Nina Stadler	6–4, 2–6, [11–9]
Win	11–14	Oct 2021	ITF Florence, United States	W25	Hard	(Japan) Yuriko Miyazaki	(United States) Robin Anderson (United States) Elysia Bolton	6–3, 1–6, [10–8]
Loss	11–15	Jan 2022	GB Pro-Series Loughborough, United Kingdom	W25	Hard (i)	(United Kingdom) Ali Collins	(Germany) Anna Gabric (Romania) Arina Vasilescu	4–6, 5–7
Loss	11–16	Feb 2022	ITF Mâcon, France	W25	Hard (i)	(United Kingdom) Ali Collins	(Switzerland) Xenia Knoll (Romania) Andreea Mitu	1–6, 1–6
Win	12–16	Mar 2022	Open de Touraine, France	W25	Hard (i)	(United Kingdom) Ali Collins	(Germany) Mona Barthel (Belgium) Yanina Wickmayer	2–6, 6–4, [10–6]
Loss	12–17	Jun 2022	ITF Périgueux, France	W25	Clay	(Australia) Alexandra Osborne	(Brazil) Rebeca Pereira (Chile) Daniela Seguel	4–6, 1–6
Loss	12–18	Jul 2022	Liepāja Open, Latvia	W60	Clay	(India) Prarthana Thombare	(Slovenia) Dalila Jakupović (Serbia) Ivana Jorović	4–6, 3–6
Loss	12–19	Aug 2022	ITF Vrnjačka Banja, Serbia	W25	Clay	(India) Prarthana Thombare	(Romania) Cristina Dinu (Ukraine) Valeriya Strakhova	1–6, 6–4, [8–10]
Loss	12–20	Jan 2023	ITF Naples, United States	W25	Clay	(United States) Quinn Gleason	(United States) Reese Brantmeier (United States) Makenna Jones	4–6, 2–6
Loss	12–21	Feb 2023	GB Pro-Series Bath, UK	W25	Hard (i)	(Netherlands) Isabelle Haverlag	(United Kingdom) Lauryn John-Baptiste (Slovakia) Katarína Strešnaková	6–7^{(4)}, 4–6
Win	13–21	Apr 2023	Chiasso Open, Switzerland	W60	Clay	(Germany) Julia Lohoff	(Romania) Andreea Mitu (Argentina) Nadia Podoroska	6–1, 6–2
Win	14–21	Apr 2023	ITF Nottingham, UK	W25	Hard	(United Kingdom) Lauryn John-Baptiste	(India) Rutuja Bhosale (Netherlands) Arianne Hartono	6–4, 6–3
Loss	14–22	May 2023	Wiesbaden Open, Germany	W100	Clay	(Germany) Julia Lohoff	(Australia) Jaimee Fourlis (Australia) Olivia Gadecki	1–6, 4–6
Win	15–22	May 2023	Grado Tennis Cup, Italy	W60	Clay	(Germany) Julia Lohoff	Sofya Lansere (Czech Republic) Anna Sisková	3–6, 6–4, [11–9]
Win	16–22	Sep 2023	ITF Saint-Palais-sur-Mer, France	W40	Clay	(Ukraine) Valeriya Strakhova	(France) Victoria Muntean (India) Vasanti Shinde	6–1, 6–2
Loss	16–23	Oct 2023	Open Nantes Atlantique, France	W60	Hard (i)	(Netherlands) Isabelle Haverlag	(United Kingdom) Ali Collins (United Kingdom) Lily Miyazaki	6–7^{(4)}, 2–6
Loss	16–24	Jan 2024	Open Andrézieux-Bouthéon, France	W75	Hard (i)	(United Kingdom) Freya Christie	Alevtina Ibragimova; Ekaterina Ovcharenko	6–3, 3–6, [5–10]
Win	17–24	Feb 2024	Grenoble Open, France	W75	Hard (i)	(United Kingdom) Freya Christie	(United Kingdom) Sarah Beth Grey (United Kingdom) Eden Silva	3–6, 6–1, [11–9]
Win	18–24	Apr 2024	Chiasso Open, Switzerland	W75	Clay	(Germany) Lena Papadakis	(Greece) Despina Papamichail (Switzerland) Simona Waltert	4–6, 6–4, [10–6]
Win	19–24	Apr 2024	Charlottesville Open, United States	W75	Clay	(United States) Quinn Gleason	Maria Kononova; Maria Kozyreva	7–6^{(5)}, 6–1
Loss	19–25	May 2024	Zagreb Ladies Open, Croatia	W75	Clay	(India) Prarthana Thombare	(Brazil) Laura Pigossi (Switzerland) Céline Naef	6–4, 1–6, [8–10]
Win	20–25	Sep 2024	Ladies Open Vienna, Austria	W75	Clay	(France) Estelle Cascino	(Ukraine) Maryna Kolb (Ukraine) Nadiia Kolb	6–4, 7–6^{(1)}
Loss	20–26	Feb 2025	AK Ladies Open, Germany	W75	Carpet (i)	(Netherlands) Isabelle Haverlag	(Belgium) Marie Benoît (Slovenia) Dalila Jakupović	5–7, 6–7^{(6)}
Win	21–26	Nov 2025	Kyotec Open, Luxembourg	W75	Hard (i)	(Belgium) Magali Kempen	(Belgium) Yvonne Cavallé Reimers (Italy) Angelica Moratelli	6–3, 3–6, [10–6]
Loss	21–27	Jan 2026	ITF Manchester, UK	W50	Hard (i)	(Poland) Weronika Falkowska	(United Kingdom) Alicia Dudeney (Estonia) Elena Malõgina	6–1, 6–7^{(6)}, [7–10]
Loss	21–28	Mar 2026	ITF Helsinki, Finland	W50	Hard (i)	(Slovakia) Viktória Hrunčáková	(Sweden) Caijsa Hennemann (Sweden) Lisa Zaar	6–2, 3–6, [8–10]
Loss	21–29	Apr 2026	ITF Roehampton, UK	W50	Hard	(Slovakia) Viktória Hrunčáková	(United Kingdom) Freya Christie (United Kingdom) Eden Silva	6–7^{(7)}, 6–3, [6–10]
Loss	21–30	Jul 2026	ITF Aldershot, UK	W35	Hard	(Slovakia) Katarína Kužmová	(United Kingdom) Savannah Dada-Mascoll (United Kingdom) Kristina Paskauskas	4–6, 3–6
Win	22–30	Aug 2026	ITF Roehampton, UK	W35	Hard	(United Kingdom) Ella McDonald	(United Kingdom) Brooke Black (Kenya) Angella Okutoyi	7–5, 7–6^{(2)}
