= 2023 Challenger Banque Nationale de Saguenay – Doubles =

Doubles
- 2023 Challenger Banque Nationale de Saguenay

Final
- Champions: (United States) Robin Anderson (United States) Dalayna Hewitt
- Runners-up: (Canada) Mia Kupres (Denmark) Johanne Svendsen
- Score: 6–1, 6–4

Events
Singles	Doubles
← 2022 ·	Challenger de Saguenay	· 2024 →

Arianne Hartono and Olivia Tjandramulia are the defending champions but both players chose not to participate.

Robin Anderson and Dalayna Hewitt won the title, defeating Mia Kupres and Johanne Svendsen in the final, 6–1, 6–4.

== Seeds ==
1. (United Kingdom) Sarah Beth Grey / (United Kingdom) Eden Silva (quarterfinals)
2. (United States) Robin Anderson / (United States) Dalayna Hewitt (champions)
3. (Serbia) Katarina Jokić / (Lithuania) Justina Mikulskytė (first round)
4. (Hungary) Fanny Stollár / (Switzerland) Lulu Sun (withdrew)

== Draw ==
=== Key ===
- Q = Qualifier
- WC = Wild card
- LL = Lucky loser
- Alt = Alternate
- SE = Special exempt
- PR = Protected ranking
- ITF = ITF entry
- JE = Junior exempt
- w/o = Walkover
- r = Retired
- d = Defaulted
- SR = Special ranking

=== Draw ===
First round
1	(United Kingdom) SB Grey (United Kingdom) E Silva	6	6
(Japan) N Hanatani (United States) S León	1	3
(Canada) L Kwong (United States) A Ulyashchenko	6	6^{2}	[5]
(Canada) I Boulais (Canada) L Sleeth	4	7^{7}	[10]
3	(Serbia) K Jokić (Lithuania) J Mikulskytė	4	4
(Canada) M Kupres (Denmark) J Svendsen	6	6
(United States) M Lewis (United States) B Walker	3	3
WC	(Canada) C Brace (Canada) N Lagaev	6	6
(Canada) C Branstine (Poland) O Lincer	6	6
(United States) Z Hitt (Germany) J Jebawy	3	1
(Netherlands) L Pattinama Kerkhove (Poland) U Radwańska	7^{8}	1	[8]
Alt	(United States) C Campana (United States) I Corley	6^{6}	6	[10]
(United States) P Corley (France) V Muntean	6	6
WC	(Canada) L-S Alexis (Canada) R Leroux	4	3
(Canada) S Nicholson (Canada) R Verma	3	3
2	(United States) R Anderson (United States) D Hewitt	6	6

Quarterfinals
1	(United Kingdom) SB Grey (United Kingdom) E Silva	3	2
(Canada) I Boulais (Canada) L Sleeth	6	6
(Canada) M Kupres (Denmark) J Svendsen	6	6
WC	(Canada) C Brace (Canada) N Lagaev	0	0
(Canada) C Branstine (Poland) O Lincer	2	6	[6]
Alt	(United States) C Campana (United States) I Corley	6	4	[10]
(United States) P Corley (France) V Muntean	2	7^{8}	[6]
2	(United States) R Anderson (United States) D Hewitt	6	6^{6}	[10]

Semifinals
(Canada) I Boulais (Canada) L Sleeth	5	4
(Canada) M Kupres (Denmark) J Svendsen	7	6
Alt	(United States) C Campana (United States) I Corley	4	0
2	(United States) R Anderson (United States) D Hewitt	6	6

Final
(Canada) M Kupres (Denmark) J Svendsen	1	4
2	(United States) R Anderson (United States) D Hewitt	6	6
