= 2017 Challenger Banque Nationale de Saguenay – Doubles =

Doubles
- 2017 Challenger Banque Nationale de Saguenay

Final
- Champions: (Canada) Bianca Andreescu (Canada) Carol Zhao
- Runners-up: (United States) Francesca Di Lorenzo (New Zealand) Erin Routliffe
- Score: Walkover

Events
Singles	Doubles
- Challenger de Saguenay

Elena Bogdan and Mihaela Buzărnescu were the defending champions, but decided not to participate this year.

Bianca Andreescu and Carol Zhao won the title after Francesca Di Lorenzo and Erin Routliffe gave them a walkover in the final because of an injury.

== Seeds ==
1. (United States) Emina Bektas / (Chile) Alexa Guarachi (semifinals)
2. (Belgium) An-Sophie Mestach / (United Kingdom) Tara Moore (quarterfinals)
3. (Slovakia) Michaela Hončová / (Netherlands) Bibiane Schoofs (first round)
4. (Serbia) Jovana Jakšić / (Switzerland) Amra Sadiković (first round)

== Draw ==
Key

- Q = Qualifier
- WC = Wild card
- LL = Lucky loser
- Alt = Alternate
- ITF = ITF entry
- PR = Protected ranking
- SR = Special ranking
- SE = Special exempt
- JE = Junior exempt
- JR = Junior Accelerator Programme entrant
- CO = College Accelerator Programme entrant
- NG = Next Gen Accelerator Program entrant
- w/o = Walkover
- r = Retired
- d = Defaulted

First round
1	(United States) E Bektas (Chile) A Guarachi	6	7
(United States) C Van Nguyen (United States) J Wacnik	2	5
(United States) S Carrington (United States) A Smith	6^{4}	0^{r}
(United States) J Elbaba (Canada) C Robillard-Millette	7^{7}	2
4	(Serbia) J Jakšić (Switzerland) A Sadiković	1	0
(Belgium) Y Bonaventure (Mexico) V Rodríguez	6	6
(United States) F Di Lorenzo (New Zealand) E Routliffe	7^{7}	2
(United States) Q Gleason (Chinese Taipei) C-y Hsu	6^{1}	1^{r}
(United States) K Shaffer (United States) R Yurovsky	2	6	[4]
WC	(Canada) A Craciun (Canada) P Januskova	6	2	[10]
(Canada) B Andreescu (Canada) C Zhao	7^{7}	6
3	(Slovakia) M Hončová (Netherlands) B Schoofs	6^{3}	4
WC	(Canada) LA Fernandez (Canada) C Leduc	1	6	[4]
(France) J Ponchet (Belgium) K Zimmermann	6	4	[10]
WC	(United States) M Mateas (United States) A Morozova	1	1
2	(Belgium) A-S Mestach (United Kingdom) T Moore	6	6

Quarterfinals
1	(United States) E Bektas (Chile) A Guarachi	6	6
(United States) J Elbaba (Canada) C Robillard-Millette	1	0
(Belgium) Y Bonaventure (Mexico) V Rodríguez	6^{3}	6	[9]
(United States) F Di Lorenzo (New Zealand) E Routliffe	7^{7}	3	[11]
WC	(Canada) A Craciun (Canada) P Januskova	4	4
(Canada) B Andreescu (Canada) C Zhao	6	6
(France) J Ponchet (Belgium) K Zimmermann	6	6
2	(Belgium) A-S Mestach (United Kingdom) T Moore	4	3

Semifinals
1	(United States) E Bektas (Chile) A Guarachi	6	3	[2]
(United States) F Di Lorenzo (New Zealand) E Routliffe	2	6	[10]
(Canada) B Andreescu (Canada) C Zhao	6	7
(France) J Ponchet (Belgium) K Zimmermann	2	5

Final
(United States) F Di Lorenzo (New Zealand) E Routliffe
(Canada) B Andreescu (Canada) C Zhao	w/o
