= Mia Kupres =

Canadian tennis player (born 2004)

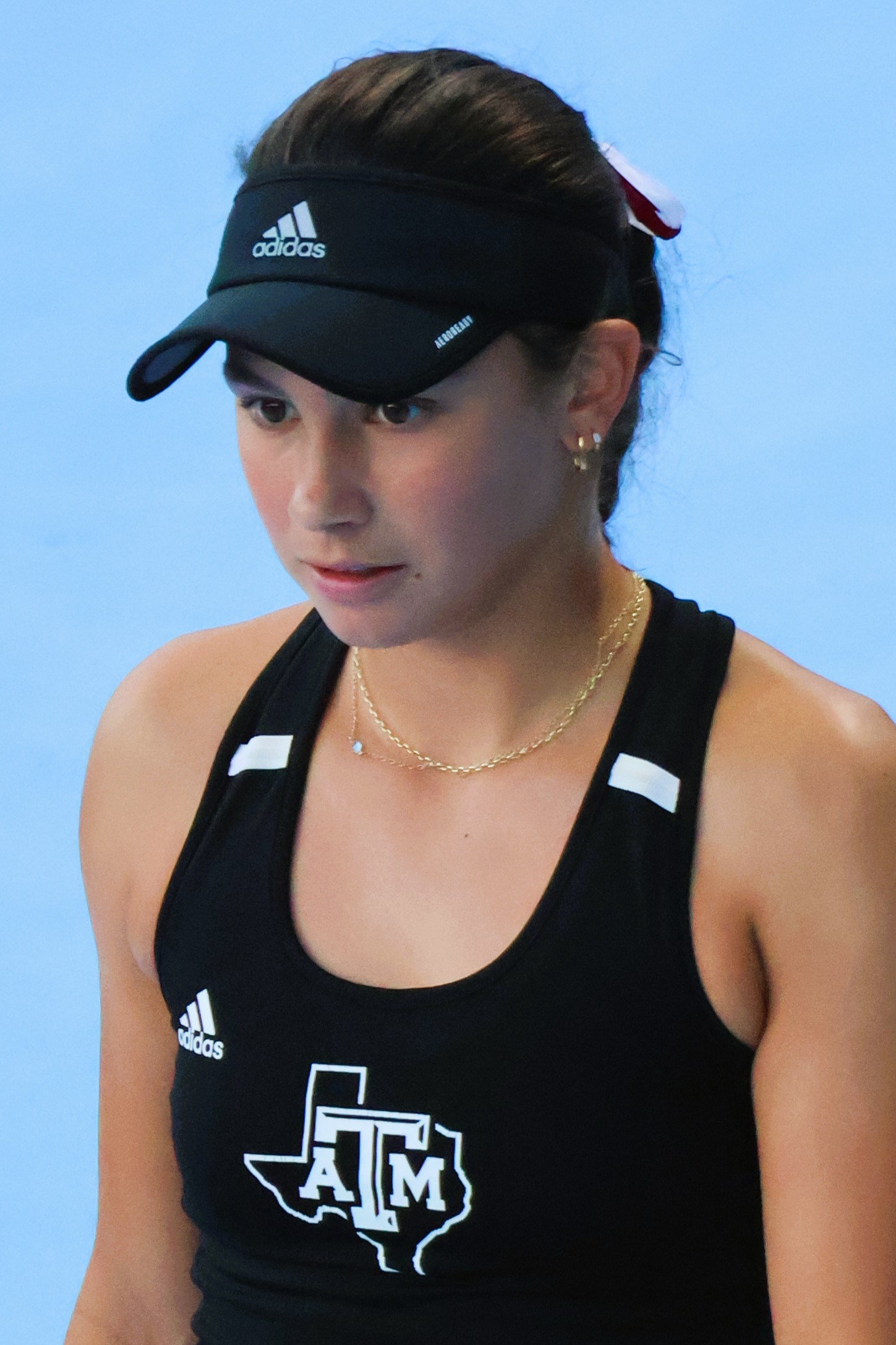
- Kupres with Texas A&M in 2024
- Country (sports): Canada
- Residence: Montreal, Quebec
- Born: January 12, 2004 (age 22) Edmonton, Alberta
- Height: 5 ft 7 in (170 cm)
- Plays: Right (two-handed backhand)
- College: Texas A&M (2023–)
- Prize money: $41,019

Singles
- Career record: 33–33
- Career titles: 0
- Highest ranking: No. 756 (October 21, 2024)
- Current ranking: No. 1,306 (June 29, 2026)

Grand Slam singles results
- Australian Open Junior: 2R (2022)
- French Open Junior: 1R (2022)
- Wimbledon Junior: 2R (2022)
- US Open Junior: 3R (2022)

Doubles
- Career record: 35–21
- Career titles: 3 ITF
- Highest ranking: No. 170 (July 14, 2025)
- Current ranking: No. 839 (June 29, 2026)

Grand Slam doubles results
- Australian Open Junior: 2R (2022)
- French Open Junior: 2R (2022)
- US Open Junior: QF (2022)
- Last updated on: July 7, 2026.

Mia Kupres (born January 12, 2004) is a Canadian inactive tennis player. She has a career-high doubles ranking by the WTA of No. 170, achieved on 14 July 2025.

Kupres has won three doubles titles on the ITF Women's World Tennis Tour.

She plays college tennis for the Texas A&M Aggies.

== Early life ==
Kupres was born in Edmonton, Canada, in 2004. Her parents emigrated from Serbia in 1998. She took up tennis at age six and trained at the Saville Community Sports Centre. At age 15, she moved to Montreal to practice at the National Training Centre.

== College ==
Kupres began playing for the Texas A&M Aggies in the spring of 2023. She went 19–4 in singles mostly at court three and four, which led the Southeastern Conference (SEC) in dual match singles wins. She began her doubles partnership with Mary Stoiana in March. She clinched the win over No. 4 Georgia to help the No. 2 Aggies go undefeated in conference play that season. She was a record five-time SEC Freshman of the Week and named to the All-SEC second team and SEC All-Freshman team.

Kupres went 23–9 in singles in the 2024 season, earning first-team All-SEC honors. Kupres and Stoiana were ranked as high as No. 3 in doubles and made the quarterfinals of the 2024 NCAA Championships, earning All-American honors. Kupres helped the Aggies win their first NCAA team championship that season.

== Career ==
=== Juniors ===
Kupres won the Outdoor Junior National Championships in singles at the under-14 and under-18 levels. She competed on the ITF Junior Circuit from 2017 to 2022, winning two singles titles and two doubles titles, and reached a peak ranking of No. 33. She was one of the top prospects of her age in Canada and signed a letter of intent to play at Texas A&M University in 2021. She played all of the junior Grand Slam tournaments in 2022, reaching the third round in singles and doubles at the US Open.

=== Professional ===
Kupres made her debut on the ITF Women's World Tennis Tour in doubles at the W25 event in Gatineau, Quebec, in July 2019. She qualified for the singles main draw for the first time at the W15 event in Prokuplje, Serbia, in July 2021. She won her first ITF doubles title at the W15 event in Oberpullendorf, Austria, in December 2022.

Partnering Ariana Arseneault, Kupres won the 2024 Championnats de Granby, defeating Liang En-shuo and Park So-hyun in the final. The pair were also runners-up at the 2024 Dow Tennis Classic, losing to second seeds Emily Appleton and Maia Lumsden in the final.

== WTA 125 finals ==
=== Doubles: 1 (runner-up) ===
Result	W–L	Date	Tournament	Surface	Partner	Opponents	Score
Loss	0–1	Nov 2024	Midland Classic, United States	Hard (i)	(Canada) Ariana Arseneault	(United Kingdom) Emily Appleton (United Kingdom) Maia Lumsden	2–6, 6–4, [5–10]

== ITF Circuit finals ==
=== Singles: 2 (1 title, 1 runner-up) ===
Legend W35 tournaments W15 tournaments	Finals by surface Hard (1–1)

Result	W–L	Date	Tournament	Tier	Surface	Opponent	Score
Loss	0–1	Aug 2024	Saskatoon Challenger, Canada	W35	Hard	(Canada) Kayla Cross	6–4, 4–6, 4–6
Win	1–1	Nov 2026	ITF Lincoln, United States	W15	Hard (i)	(United Kingdom) Kristina Paskauskas	6–2, 6–2

=== Doubles: 5 (3 titles, 2 runner-up) ===
Legend
W60/75 tournaments (1–2)
W35 tournaments (1–0)
W15 tournaments (1–0)

Result	W–L	Date	Tournament	Tier	Surface	Partner	Opponents	Score
Win	1–0	Dec 2022	ITF Oberpullendorf, Austria	W15	Hard (i)	Ksenia Laskutova	(Austria) Arabella Koller (Austria) Mavie Österreicher	7–5, 7–5
Loss	1–1	Oct 2023	Challenger de Saguenay, Canada	W60	Hard (i)	(Denmark) Johanne Svendsen	(United States) Robin Anderson (United States) Dalayna Hewitt	1–6, 4–6
Win	2–1	Jul 2024	Championnats de Granby, Canada	W75	Hard	(Canada) Ariana Arseneault	(Chinese Taipei) Liang En-shuo (South Korea) Park So-hyun	6–4, 2–6, [10–6]
Win	3–1	Aug 2024	Saskatoon Challenger, Canada	W35	Hard	(Canada) Ariana Arseneault	(Japan) Hiroko Kuwata (United States) Maribella Zamarripa	6–4, 6–3
Loss	3–2	Jul 2026	Championnats de Granby, Canada	W75	Hard	(Canada) Alexandra Vagramov	(United States) Kylie Collins (United States) Olivia Lincer	2–6, 2–6
