= 2025 Challenger Banque Nationale de Saguenay =

Tennis tournament

- Date: 20–26 October 2025
- Edition: 18th
- Category: ITF Women's World Tennis Tour
- Prize money: $60,000
- Surface: Hard / Indoor
- Location: Saguenay, Quebec, Canada

2024 Champions

Singles
- Anastasia Tikhonova

Doubles
- (Canada) Ariana Arseneault / (Canada) Raphaëlle Lacasse
- Challenger de Saguenay

The 2025 Challenger Banque Nationale de Saguenay is a professional tennis tournament played on indoor hard courts. It was the nineteenth edition of the tournament which was part of the 2025 ITF Women's World Tennis Tour. It took place in Saguenay, Quebec, Canada between 20 and 26 October 2025.

== Champions ==
=== Singles ===
- Anastasia Tikhonova def. (Slovakia) Viktória Hrunčáková, 6–3, 6–2

=== Doubles ===
- (Canada) Ariana Arseneault / (Canada) Raphaëlle Lacasse def. (Netherlands) Jasmijn Gimbrère / (United States) Anna Rogers, 5–7, 6–3, [10–5]

== Singles main draw entrants ==
=== Seeds ===
Country	Player	Rank^{1}	Seed
CAN	Kayla Cross	223	1
SVK	Viktória Hrunčáková	226	2
USA	Anna Rogers	253	3
	Anastasia Tikhonova	335	4
TUR	Ayla Aksu	345	5
SUI	Jenny Dürst	346	6
GBR	Amelia Rajecki	413	7
JPN	Ayumi Koshiishi	436	8

- ^{1} Rankings are as of 13 October 2025.

=== Other entrants ===
The following players received wildcards into the singles main draw:

- (Canada) Raphaëlle Lacasse
- (Canada) Alexandra Vagramov
- (Canada) Teah Chavez
- (Canada) Nadia Lagaev

The following player received entry into the singles main draw using a special ranking:

- (United States) Ava Markham

The following players received entry from the qualifying draw:

- (Canada) Avery Alexander
- (Slovakia) Irina Balus
- (United States) Kylie Collins
- (United States) Maya Iyengar
- (United States) Lilian Poling
- (United States) Adriana Reami
- (Sweden) Julita Saner
- (United States) Anastasia Sysoeva
