= Challenger de Saguenay =

Tennis tournament in Canada

Challenger Banque Nationale de Saguenay
- 2025 Challenger Banque Nationale de Saguenay

Women's World Tennis Tour
- Founded: 2006; 20 years ago
- Location: Saguenay, Quebec, Canada
- Venue: Club de tennis intérieur Saguenay
- Category: ITF Women's Circuit
- Surface: Hard – indoors
- Draw: 32S (32Q) / 16D (0Q)
- Prize money: US$ 60,000
- Website: Official website

The Challenger de Saguenay, currently sponsored as Challenger Banque Nationale de Saguenay, is a professional tennis tournament played on indoor hardcourts. The event is classified as a $60,000 ITF Women's Circuit tournament and has been held in Saguenay, Quebec, since 2006.

== Past finals ==
=== Singles ===
Year	Champion	Runner-up	Score
2026	(United States) Reese Brantmeier	(Japan) Yuki Naito	7–6^{(10–8)}, 7–6^{(9–7)}
2025	Anastasia Tikhonova	(Slovakia) Viktória Hrunčáková	6–3, 6–2
2024	(Croatia) Petra Marčinko	(Netherlands) Anouk Koevermans	6–3, 4–6, 7–6^{(7–3)}
2023	(Canada) Katherine Sebov	(Hungary) Fanny Stollár	6–4, 6–4
2022	(India) Karman Thandi	(Canada) Katherine Sebov	3–6, 6–4, 6–3
2020–21	Cancelled due to the COVID-19 pandemic		
2019	(Netherlands) Indy de Vroome	(United States) Robin Anderson	3–6, 6–4, 7–5
2018	(Canada) Katherine Sebov	(Netherlands) Quirine Lemoine	7–6^{(12–10)}, 7–6^{(7–4)}
2017	(Hungary) Gréta Arn	(Netherlands) Bibiane Schoofs	6–1, 6–2
2016	(United States) Catherine Bellis	(Canada) Bianca Andreescu	6–4, 6–2
2015	(Serbia) Jovana Jakšić	(Switzerland) Amra Sadiković	6–3, 6–7^{(5–7)}, 6–1
2014	(France) Julie Coin	(Serbia) Jovana Jakšić	7–5, 6–3
2013	(Tunisia) Ons Jabeur	(United States) CoCo Vandeweghe	6–7^{(0–7)}, 6–3, 6–3
2012	(United States) Madison Keys	(Canada) Eugenie Bouchard	6–4, 6–2
2011	(Hungary) Tímea Babos	(United States) Julia Boserup	7–6^{(9–7)}, 6–3
2010	(Canada) Rebecca Marino	(United States) Alison Riske	6–4, 6–7^{(4–7)}, 7–6^{(7–5)}
2009	(Sweden) Sofia Arvidsson	(France) Séverine Brémond Beltrame	5–7, 6–4, 7–6^{(7–1)}
2008	(United States) Alexa Glatch	(Italy) Alberta Brianti	6–3, 6–1
2007	(Germany) Angelique Kerber	(Germany) Sabine Lisicki	6–3, 6–4
2006	(Germany) Angelique Kerber	(Canada) Valérie Tétreault	5–7, 7–5, 7–6^{(8–6)}

=== Doubles ===
Year	Champions	Runners-up	Score
2026	(United States) Reese Brantmeier (United States) Carson Tanguilig	(Czech Republic) Michaela Bayerlová (Netherlands) Jasmijn Gimbrère	6–2, 7–6^{(7–3)}
2025	(Canada) Ariana Arseneault (Canada) Raphaëlle Lacasse	(Netherlands) Jasmijn Gimbrère (United States) Anna Rogers	5–7, 6–3, [10–5]
2024	(United States) Dalayna Hewitt (United States) Anna Rogers	(Belgium) Magali Kempen (Belgium) Lara Salden	6–1, 7–5
2023	(United States) Robin Anderson (United States) Dalayna Hewitt	(Canada) Mia Kupres (Denmark) Johanne Svendsen	6–1, 6–4
2022	(Netherlands) Arianne Hartono (Australia) Olivia Tjandramulia	(United States) Catherine Harrison (Belgium) Yanina Wickmayer	5–7, 7–6^{(7–3)}, [10–8]
2020–21	Cancelled due to the COVID-19 pandemic		
2019	(Canada) Mélodie Collard (Canada) Leylah Fernandez	(United Kingdom) Samantha Murray (Netherlands) Bibiane Schoofs	7–6^{(7–3)}, 6–2
2018	(United Kingdom) Tara Moore (Switzerland) Conny Perrin	(Canada) Sharon Fichman (United States) Maria Sanchez	6–0, 5–7, [10–7]
2017	(Canada) Bianca Andreescu (Canada) Carol Zhao	(United States) Francesca Di Lorenzo (New Zealand) Erin Routliffe	walkover
2016	(Romania) Elena Bogdan (Romania) Mihaela Buzărnescu	(Canada) Bianca Andreescu (Canada) Charlotte Robillard-Millette	6–4, 6–7^{(4–7)}, [10–6]
2015	(Romania) Mihaela Buzărnescu (Poland) Justyna Jegiołka	(Canada) Sharon Fichman (United States) Maria Sanchez	7–6^{(8–6)}, 4–6, [10–7]
2014	(Belgium) Ysaline Bonaventure (United Kingdom) Nicola Slater	(Canada) Sonja Molnar (United States) Caitlin Whoriskey	6–4, 6–4
2013	(Poland) Marta Domachowska (Czech Republic) Andrea Hlaváčková	(Canada) Françoise Abanda (United States) Victoria Duval	7–5, 6–3
2012	(Canada) Gabriela Dabrowski (Russia) Alla Kudryavtseva	(Canada) Sharon Fichman (Canada) Marie-Ève Pelletier	6–2, 6–2
2011	(Hungary) Tímea Babos (United States) Jessica Pegula	(Canada) Gabriela Dabrowski (Canada) Marie-Ève Pelletier	6–4, 6–3
2010	(Argentina) Jorgelina Cravero (France) Stéphanie Foretz Gacon	(Canada) Heidi El Tabakh (Canada) Rebecca Marino	6–3, 6–4
2009	(Sweden) Sofia Arvidsson (France) Séverine Brémond Beltrame	(Canada) Stéphanie Dubois (Canada) Rebecca Marino	6–3, 6–1
2008	(Hungary) Katalin Marosi (Brazil) Marina Tavares	(Canada) Gabriela Dabrowski (Canada) Sharon Fichman	2–6, 6–4, [10–4]
2007	(Germany) Angelique Kerber (Romania) Ágnes Szatmári	(Germany) Sabine Klaschka (Germany) Angelika Rösch	6–1, 6–4
2006	(Italy) Alberta Brianti (Italy) Giulia Casoni	(United States) Raquel Kops-Jones (United States) Aleke Tsoubanos	6–4, 7–6^{(7–4)}
