= Katherine Sebov =

Canadian tennis player (born 1999)

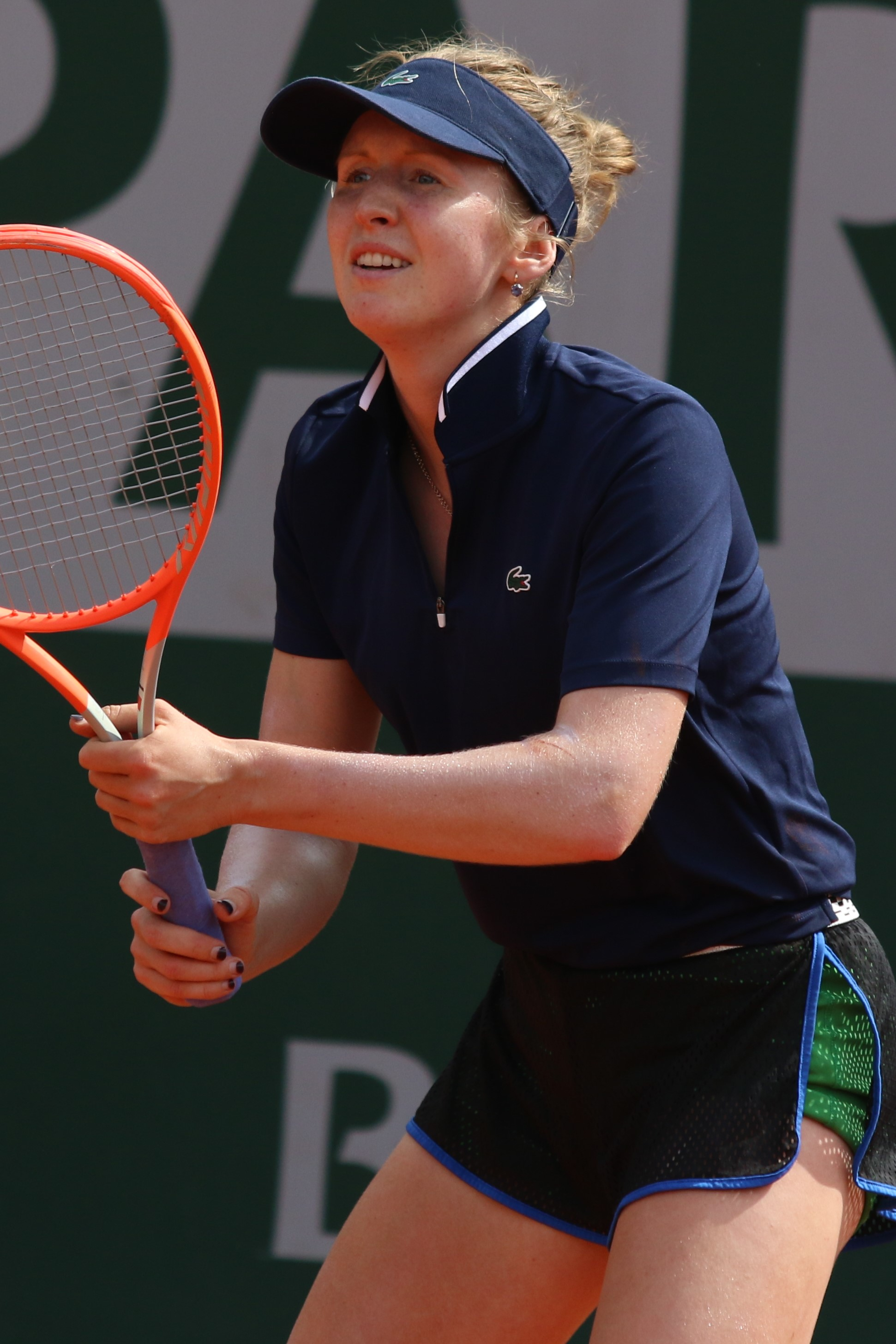
- Sebov at the 2023 French Open
- Country (sports): Canada
- Residence: Kleinburg, Ontario, CA
- Born: January 5, 1999 (age 27) Toronto, Ontario, CA
- Height: 1.73 m (5 ft 8 in)
- Turned pro: 2016
- Plays: Right (two-handed backhand)
- Prize money: $715,269

Singles
- Career record: 316–229
- Career titles: 6 ITF
- Highest ranking: No. 136 (April 10, 2023)
- Current ranking: No. 228 (October 12, 2026)

Grand Slam singles results
- Australian Open: 1R (2023)
- French Open: Q1 (2023, 2026)
- Wimbledon: Q3 (2026)
- US Open: Q1 (2019, 2023, 2026)

Doubles
- Career record: 36–55
- Career titles: 1 ITF
- Highest ranking: No. 433 (May 27, 2019)
- Current ranking: No. 586 (October 12, 2026)

Team competitions
- Fed Cup: 4–2
- Last updated on: October 18, 2026.

Katherine Sebov (born January 5, 1999) is a Canadian professional tennis player. She reached a career-high WTA singles ranking of No. 136, on 10 April 2023.

== Early life ==
Sebov was born in Toronto and is of Ukrainian descent. Her coaches are Simon Bartram in Toronto and Robert Lansdorp in Los Angeles.

== Tennis career ==
=== 2013–14 ===
Sebov made her professional debut in November 2013 at the $50k Toronto Challenger but was defeated in the qualifying second round in singles and in the first round in doubles. In July 2013, she had won her first junior singles title at the G-4 in Vancouver. In July 2014 at Wimbledon, she qualified for her junior Grand Slam main-draw debut where she lost in the first round in singles and in the quarterfinals in the doubles. In September 2014, Sebov advanced to the third round in singles as a qualifier at the junior US Open and was defeated in the first round in doubles.

=== 2015 ===
In January, Sebov won her second singles junior title, this time at the G-1 in Traralgon. A week later, she reached the second round in singles and the quarterfinals in doubles at the junior event of the Australian Open. In March, she qualified for the main draw of the $25k event in Rancho Santa Fe, but fell in the first round to CiCi Bellis. Sebov made it to the second round in singles and to the first round in doubles at the junior French Open in May. Sebov reached a career-high combined junior ranking of No. 22, achieved on 20 July 2015. In June at the junior competition of Wimbledon, she was eliminated in the first round in singles and in the second in doubles. In July, she qualified for the main draw of the $50k Challenger de Granby , defeating compatriot Catherine Leduc (world No. 155), Julia Glushko, and fellow Canadian Petra Januskova. She was eliminated by Amandine Hesse (No. 224) in the opening round. At the US Open junior singles tournament, she fell in the first round.

=== 2016 ===
At the Australian Open, Sebov advanced to the third round of the junior event in singles but was defeated in the first round in doubles. She decided to focus on the pro circuit for the rest of the season and did not play any other junior tournaments. In May, she reached back-to-back semifinals at $10ks in Antalya. In October, she qualified at the $50k in Saguenay where she was defeated by Sachia Vickery in the second round. Two weeks later in Toronto, she qualified for her second straight $50k main draw, but was once again stopped in the second round, by eventual winner CiCi Bellis.

=== 2017 ===
In January, Sebov qualified and reached the semifinals of the $25k tournament in Orlando. Two weeks later, she qualified for the $100k Midland Classic and defeated world No. 121, Verónica Cepede Royg, in the opening round. She next played Sofya Zhuk and defeated her in straight sets. In the quarterfinals, Sebov scored the biggest win of her career so far with a victory over world No. 97, Varvara Lepchenko, her first top-100 win. She lost to world No. 98, Naomi Broady, in the next round. Sebov was selected to represent Canada at the Fed Cup Americas Zone Group I in early February, along with Bianca Andreescu, Charlotte Robillard-Millette and Carol Zhao, and made her debut with wins over María Fernanda Álvarez Terán of Bolivia, Montserrat González of Paraguay and Bárbara Gatica of Chile. She ended the ties with a 4–0 overall record and helped Canada reach the World Group II Play-offs. In late February, at the $25k event in Rancho Santa Fe, she advanced to the semifinals where she lost to the first seed Kayla Day. In July, she reached her first professional final at the $60k Challenger de Granby but was defeated by Cristiana Ferrando.

=== 2018 ===
In March, at a $25k tournament in Toyota, Sebov reached her second final losing to Dejana Radanović, in three sets.

=== 2021–25: WTA Tour debut, top 150 ===
Sebov made her WTA Tour main-draw debut as a qualifier at the 2021 Chicago Open, losing to Marta Kostyuk in the first round. She made her WTA 1000 debut at the 2022 Canadian Open as a wildcard.

She qualified for her major main-draw debut at the 2023 Australian Open. Ranked No. 172, she made her debut at the 2023 Miami Open also as a qualifier, and defeated Linda Fruhvirtová for her first WTA 1000 and top-50 win, before losing to third seed Jessica Pegula in the second round.

Sebov qualified for the 2025 Charleston Open but was double bageled by Katie Volynets in the first round.

== Performance timelines ==
Key
W	F	SF	QF	#R	RR	Q#	DNQ	A	NH

(W) winner; (F) finalist; (SF) semifinalist; (QF) quarterfinalist; (#R) rounds 4, 3, 2, 1; (RR) round-robin stage; (Q#) qualification round; (DNQ) did not qualify; (A) absent; (NH) not held; (SR) strike rate (events won / competed); (W–L) win–loss record.
To avoid confusion and double counting, these charts are updated at the conclusion of a tournament or when the player's participation has ended.

Only main-draw results in WTA Tour, Grand Slam tournaments, Fed Cup/Billie Jean King Cup and Olympic Games are included in win–loss records.

=== Singles ===
Current through the 2025 Canadian Open.

Tournament	2015	2016	2017	2018	2019	2020	2021	2022	2023	2024	2025	W–L
Grand Slam tournaments
Australian Open	A	A	A	A	Q1	A	A	A	1R	Q3	A	0–1
French Open	A	A	A	A	A	A	A	A	Q1	A	A	0–0
Wimbledon	A	A	A	A	A	NH	A	A	Q2	A	A	0–0
US Open	A	A	A	A	Q1	A	A	A	Q1	A	A	0–0
Win–Loss	0–0	0–0	0–0	0–0	0–0	0–0	0–0	0–0	0–1	0–0	0–0	0–1
WTA 1000
Miami Open	A	A	A	A	A	NH	A	A	2R	A	A	1–1
Italian Open	A	A	A	A	A	NH	A	A	Q1	A	A	0–0
Canadian Open	Q1	A	Q1	Q1	Q1	NH	Q1	1R	Q1	Q1	Q1	0–1
Career statistics
Tournaments	0 (Note: During the season, she did not play in the main draw of any WTA Tour-level tournaments. However, she played in the Billie Jean King Cup, which is not counted as a tournament but matches count.)	0	0	0	0	0	1	2	3			Total: 6
Overall win-loss	3–0	0–0	0–0	0–1	0–0	0–0	0–1	1–2	2–3			6–7

== ITF Circuit finals ==
=== Singles: 15 (6 titles, 9 runner-ups) ===
Legend W100 tournaments (0–1) W60/75 tournaments (2–4) W25/35 tournaments (4–4)	Finals by surface Hard (6–9)

Result	W–L	Date	Tournament	Tier	Surface	Opponent	Score
Loss	0–1	Jul 2017	Challenger de Granby, Canada	60,000	Hard	(Italy) Cristiana Ferrando	2–6, 3–6
Loss	0–2	Mar 2018	ITF Toyota, Japan	25,000	Hard	(Serbia) Dejana Radanović	4–6, 6–3, 4–6
Win	1–2	Oct 2018	Challenger de Saguenay, Canada	60,000	Hard (i)	(Netherlands) Quirine Lemoine	7–6^{(10)}, 7–6^{(4)}
Loss	1–3	Jun 2019	ITF Figueira da Foz, Portugal	W25+H	Hard	(Turkey) İpek Soylu	7–6^{(2)}, 6–7^{(5)}, 3–6
Loss	1–4	Jul 2019	ITF Saskatoon, Canada	W25	Hard	(Australia) Maddison Inglis	4–6, 6–2, 4–6
Loss	1-5	Jan 2022	ITF Monastir, Tunisia	W25	Hard	(South Korea) Han Na-lae	3–6, 2–6
Loss	1–6	Oct 2022	Challenger de Saguenay, Canada	W60	Hard (i)	(India) Karman Thandi	6–3, 4–6, 3–6
Win	2–6	Dec 2022	ITF Tauranga, New Zealand	W25	Hard	(Czech Republic) Michaela Bayerlová	6–0, 6–4
Win	3–6	Mar 2023	ITF Toronto, Canada	W25	Hard (i)	(Japan) Himeno Sakatsume	6–4, 7–6^{(4)}
Loss	3–7	Jul 2023	Championnats de Granby, Canada	W100	Hard	(United States) Kayla Day	4–6, 6–2, 5–7
Win	4–7	Oct 2023	Challenger de Saguenay, Canada	W60	Hard (i)	(Hungary) Fanny Stollár	6–4, 6–4
Win	5–7	Jan 2025	ITF Naples, United States	W35	Hard	(Italy) Jessica Pieri	6–2, 6–0
Win	6–7	Dec 2025	ITF Monastir, Tunisia	W35	Hard	(France) Nahia Berecoechea	6–4, 6–1
Loss	6–8	Apr 2026	ITF Calvi, France	W75	Hard	(Belgium) Jeline Vandromme	0–6, 0–6
Loss	6–9	Oct 2026	Tevlin Women's Challenger, Canada	W75	Hard (i)	(United States) Reese Brantmeier	3–6, 1–6

=== Doubles: 1 (title) ===
Legend W25 tournaments (1–0)	Finals by surface Carpet (1–0)

Result	W–L	Date	Tournament	Tier	Partner	Surface	Opponents	Score
Win	1–0	Dec 2021	ITF Jablonec nad Nisou, Czech Republic	W25	(Poland) Maja Chwalińska	Carpet (i)	(Czech Republic) Lucie Havlíčková (Czech Republic) Linda Klimovičová	7–5, 6–4
