= Dalayna Hewitt =

American tennis player (born 2000)

- Country (sports): United States
- Born: December 16, 2000 (age 25)
- Plays: Right (two-handed backhand)
- Prize money: $140,124

Singles
- Career record: 145–149
- Career titles: 2 ITF
- Highest ranking: No. 383 (May 6, 2024)
- Current ranking: No. 605 (May 18, 2026)

Doubles
- Career record: 165–103
- Career titles: 16 ITF
- Highest ranking: No. 106 (August 10, 2026)
- Current ranking: No. 106 (August 10, 2026)
- Last updated on: 19 August 2026.

Dalayna Hewitt (born December 16, 2000) is an American tennis player.

Hewitt has a career-high singles ranking by the WTA of 383, reached on May 6, 2024. She also has a career-high WTA doubles ranking of 130, achieved on August 10, 2026.

Hewitt made her WTA Tour main-draw debut at the 2022 Tennis in the Land in Cleveland, after qualifying for the singles tournament, losing to Sofia Kenin in the first round. She also received a wildcard for the doubles main draw with Peyton Stearns.

Partnering Robin Anderson, Hewitt was runner-up at the 2024 Calgary Challenger, a W75 event, losing in the final to Kayla Cross and Maribella Zamarripa in a champions tiebreak.

== WTA 125 finals ==
=== Doubles: 2 (1 title, 1 runner-up) ===
Result	W–L	Date	Tournament	Surface	Partner	Opponents	Score
Loss	0–1	Sep 2026	Barranquilla Open, Colombia	Hard	(United States) Alana Smith	(United States) Rasheeda McAdoo (United States) Anna Rogers	6–7^{(3–7)}, 3–6
Win	1–1	Oct 2026	Courmayeur Ladies Open, Italy	Hard {i}	(United States) Catherine Harrison	(United Kingdom) Madeleine Brooks (Sweden) Lisa Zaar	6–4, 6–4

== ITF Circuit finals ==
=== Singles: 6 (2 titles, 4 runner-ups) ===
Legend W50 tournaments W25 tournaments W15 tournaments	Finals by surface Hard (2–3) Clay (0–1)

Result	W–L	Date	Tournament	Tier	Surface	Opponent	Score
Loss	0–1	Sep 2019	ITF Lubbock, US	W15	Hard	(United States) Jessica Livianu	4–6, 6–1, 3–6
Loss	0–2	Oct 2019	ITF Norman, US	W15	Hard	(Italy) Anna Turati	2–6, 3–6
Win	1–2	Jul 2021	ITF Monastir, Tunisia	W15	Hard	(Japan) Ayumi Koshilshi	6–4, 6–4
Loss	1–3	May 2023	ITF Orlando, US	W25	Clay	(Hungary) Fanny Stollár	6–7^{(4)}, 2–6
Loss	1–4	Feb 2024	ITF Mexico City, Mexico	W50	Hard	(United States) Jamie Loeb	2–6, 2–6
Win	2–4	Jul 2025	ITF Huamantla, Mexico	W15	Hard	(United States) Ava Rodriguez	6–2, 6–2

=== Doubles: 31 (16 titles, 15 runner-ups) ===
Legend W100 tournaments W60/75 tournaments W40/50 tournaments W25/35 tournaments W15 tournaments	Finals by surface Hard (16–14) Clay (0–1)

Result	W–L	Date	Tournament	Tier	Surface	Partner	Opponents	Score
Loss	0–1	Jan 2019	ITF Fort de France, Martinique	W15	Hard	(United Kingdom) Emily Appleton	(Greece) Eleni Kordolaimi (France) Alice Tubello	3–6, 7–5, [4–10]
Win	1–1	May 2021	ITF Monastir, Tunisia	W15	Hard	(United States) Chiara Scholl	(United States) Emma Davis (Colombia) María Paulina Pérez	6–4, 6–2
Loss	1–2	Jun 2021	ITF Monastir, Tunisia	W15	Hard	(United States) Kariann Pierre-Louis	(Japan) Miharu Imanishi (Japan) Haine Ogata	5–7, 6–7^{(0)}
Win	2–2	Jul 2021	ITF Monastir, Tunisia	W15	Hard	(United States) Alana Smith	(United Kingdom) Emilie Lindh (Switzerland) Valentina Ryser	6–4, 6–3
Win	3–2	Jul 2021	ITF Monastir, Tunisia	W15	Hard	(United States) Alana Smith	(Japan) Ayumi Koshilshi (Japan) Michika Ozeki	6–4, 6–2
Loss	3–3	Sep 2021	ITF Monastir, Tunisia	W15	Hard	(Serbia) Elena Milovanovic	(India) Sharamda Balu (India) Sravya Shivani Chilakalapudi	5–7, 3–6
Loss	3–4	Aug 2022	Lexington Challenger, US	W60	Hard	(United States) Jada Hart	(Ukraine) Kateryna Bondarenko (Indonesia) Aldila Sutjiadi	5–7, 3–6
Win	4–4	Mar 2023	ITF Fredericton, Canada	W25	Hard (i)	(United States) Jessie Aney	(United States) Quinn Gleason (United States) Jamie Loeb	7–6^{(2)}, 6–4
Loss	4–5	May 2023	ITF Orlando, US	W25	Clay	(Serbia) Katarina Jokić	(United States) Makenna Jones (United States) Maria Mateas	4–6, 2–6
Win	5–5	Jun 2023	ITF Madrid, Spain	W25	Hard	(United States) Alana Smith	(China) Li Zongyu (India) Vasanti Shinde	4–6, 6–2, [10–6]
Loss	5–6	Aug 2023	Lexington Challenger, US	W60	Hard	(Australia) Olivia Gadecki	(United States) Alexis Blokhina (United States) Ava Markham	4–6, 6–7^{(1)}
Win	6–6	Sep 2023	ITF Santarém, Portugal	W25	Hard	(United States) Madison Sieg	(Ukraine) Maryna Kolb (Ukraine) Nadiia Kolb	4–6, 6–2, [12–10]
Win	7–6	Oct 2023	Challenger de Saguenay, Canada	W60	Hard (i)	(United States) Robin Anderson	(Canada) Mia Kupres (Denmark) Johanne Svendsen	6–1, 6–4
Win	8–6	Nov 2023	ITF Veracruz, Mexico	W40	Hard	(Russia) Veronika Miroshnichenko	(United States) Victoria Hu (Argentina) Melany Krywoj	2–6, 6–3, [10–8]
Loss	8–7	Apr 2024	ITF Osaka, Japan	W35	Hard	(Australia) Lizette Cabrera	(Japan) Natsuho Arakawa (Japan) Miho Kuramochi	4–6, 6–3, [7–10]
Loss	8–8	Jun 2024	Sumter Open, US	W75	Hard	(United States) Sophie Chang	(Spain) Alicia Herrero Liñana (Argentina) Melany Krywoj	3–6, 3–6
Loss	8–9	Oct 2024	Calgary Challenger, Canada	W75	Hard (i)	(United States) Robin Anderson	(Canada) Kayla Cross (United States) Maribella Zamarripa	7–6^{(3)}, 5–7, [10–12]
Win	9–9	Oct 2024	Challenger de Saguenay, Canada	W75+H	Hard (i)	(United States) Anna Rogers	(Belgium) Magali Kempen (Belgium) Lara Salden	6–1, 7–5
Win	10–9	Nov 2024	ITF Veracruz, Mexico	W50	Hard	(United States) Hanna Chang	(Mexico) Jéssica Hinojosa Gómez (Japan) Hiroko Kuwata	6–4, 7–5
Win	11–9	Nov 2024	ITF Chihuahua City, Mexico	W50	Hard	(United States) Haley Giavara	(Czech Republic) Laura Samson (Mexico) Ana Sofía Sánchez	6–1, 6–3
Loss	11–10	Jan 2025	ITF Monastir, Tunisia	W15	Hard	(Serbia) Elena Milovanović	(Greece) Sapfo Sakellaridi (Slovakia) [Radka Zelníčková	1–6, 3–6
Win	12–10	Jul 2025	ITF Huamantla, Mexico	W15	Hard	(United States) Dasha Ivanova	(Mexico) Jéssica Hinojosa Gómez (Mexico) Fernanda Navarro	7–5, 4–6, [10–7]
Loss	12–11	Jul 2025	ITF Huamantla, Mexico	W15	Hard	(United States) Dasha Ivanova	(United States) Kianah Motosono (Colombia) María Torres Murcia	4–6, 4–6
Win	13–11	Oct 2025	Tyler Pro Challenge, US	W100	Hard	(Poland) Weronika Falkowska	(United States) Eryn Cayetano (United States) Victoria Hu	6–2, 6–3
Win	14–11	Oct 2025	Guanajuato Open, Mexico	W100	Hard	(United States) Victoria Hu	(Mexico) Victoria Rodríguez (Mexico) Ana Sofía Sánchez	6–4, 6–4
Win	15–11	Nov 2025	ITF Chihuahua, Mexico	W50	Hard	(United States) Anna Rogers	(Canada) Ariana Arseneault (Canada) Raphaëlle Lacasse	6–3, 6–0
Loss	15–12	Jan 2026	ITF Bradenton, US	W35	Hard	(United States) Jaeda Daniel	(United States) Carmen Corley (United States) Ivana Corley	6–4, 3–6, [5–10]
Loss	15–13	Jan 2026	San Diego Open, US	W100	Hard	(United States) Catherine Harrison	(Canada) Kayla Cross (United States) Alana Smith	2–6, 3–6
Loss	15–14	Apr 2026	Kangaroo Cup, Japan	W100	Hard	(United States) Catherine Harrison	(United Kingdom) Harriet Dart (United Kingdom) Heather Watson	6–3, 3–6, [4–10]
Win	16–14	Jun 2026	Cary Tennis Classic, US	W100	Hard	(United States) Catherine Harrison	(Japan) Hiroko Kuwata (India) Ankita Raina	6–4, 6–2
Loss	16–15	Oct 2026	ITF Lexington, US	W50	Hard	(Ukraine) Valeriya Strakhova	(Morocco) Diae El Jardi (India) Sahaja Yamalapalli	6–2, 5–7, [10–12]

=== Junior Grand Slam tournament finals ===
==== Doubles: 1 (runner-up) ====
Result	Year	Tournament	Surface	Partner	Opponents	Score
Loss	2018	US Open	Hard	(United States) Hailey Baptiste	(United States) Coco Gauff (United States) Caty McNally	3–6, 2–6
