= Johanne Svendsen =

Danish tennis player (born 2004)

- Full name: Johanne Christine Svendsen
- Country (sports): Denmark
- Born: 15 May 2004 (age 22)
- Plays: Right-handed (two-handed backhand)
- Prize money: $47,298

Singles
- Career record: 110–73
- Career titles: 3 ITF
- Highest ranking: No. 361 (12 June 2023)
- Current ranking: No. 658 (18 May 2026)

Doubles
- Career record: 33–18
- Career titles: 4 ITF
- Highest ranking: No. 516 (6 November 2023)
- Current ranking: No. 990 (18 May 2026)

Team competitions
- Fed Cup: 12–24
- Last updated on: 19 May 2026.

Johanne Christine Svendsen (born 15 May 2004) is a Danish tennis player.

Svendsen has a career-high singles ranking by the Women's Tennis Association (WTA) of 361, achieved on 12 June 2023. She has won three singles titles and four doubles titles on the ITF Circuit. On the junior tour, she has reached a career-high combined ranking of 14, achieved on 3 January 2022.

Svendsen has competed for Denmark in the Billie Jean King Cup, where she has a win-loss record of 12–24 (as of April 2026).

== Junior Grand Slam performance ==
Singles:

- Australian Open: 1R (2022)
- French Open: 3R (2022)
- Wimbledon: 2R (2022)
- US Open: 2R (2022)

Doubles:

- Australian Open: SF (2022)
- French Open: QF (2022)
- Wimbledon: 2R (2022)
- US Open: 1R (2021, 2022)

== ITF Circuit finals ==
=== Singles: 6 (3 titles, 3 runners-up) ===
Legend W25/35 tournaments W15 tournaments	Finals by surface Hard (0–3) Clay (3–0)

Result	W–L	Date	Tournament	Tier	Surface	Opponent	Score
Win	1–0	Aug 2021	ITF Vejle, Denmark	W15	Clay	(South Korea) Park So-hyun	2–6, 6–4, 6–1
Win	2–0	Jul 2022	ITF Vejle, Denmark	W15	Clay	(Denmark) Hannah Viller Møller	6–1, 6–0
Loss	2–1	Jun 2023	ITF Tokyo, Japan	W25	Hard	(China) Wang Yafan	1–6, 0–6
Loss	2–2	Apr 2025	ITF Monastir, Tunisia	W15	Hard	(United States) Hina Inoue	2–6, 0–6
Win	3–2	Jun 2025	ITF Gdańsk, Poland	W15	Clay	(Germany) Luisa Meyer auf der Heide	6–4, 2–6, 7–6^{(11)}
Loss	3–3	Sep 2025	ITF Berkeley, United States	W35	Hard	(Egypt) Merna Refaat	6–4, 5–7, 1–6

=== Doubles: 7 (4 titles, 3 runners-up) ===
Legend W60 tournaments W25 tournaments W15 tournaments	Finals by surface Hard (2–2) Clay (2–1)

Result	W–L	Date	Tournament	Tier	Surface	Partner	Opponents	Score
Win	1–0	Aug 2022	ITF Frederiksberg, Denmark	W15	Clay	(Canada) Jessica Luisa Alsola	(Denmark) Vilma Krebs Hyllested (Denmark) Rebecca Munk Mortensen	6–4, 3–6, [10–7]
Loss	1–1	Jan 2023	ITF Petit-Bourg, Guadeloupe	W25	Hard	(United States) Clervie Ngounoue	(Switzerland) Jenny Dürst (Sweden) Fanny Östlund	4–6, 3–6
Loss	1–2	Oct 2023	Challenger de Saguenay, Canada	W60	Hard (i)	(Canada) Mia Kupres	(United States) Robin Anderson (United States) Dalayna Hewitt	1–6, 4–6
Win	2–2	Sep 2024	ITF Trnava, Slovakia	W15	Hard (i)	(Denmark) Rebecca Munk Mortensen	(Hungary) Adrienn Nagy (Czech Republic) Ivana Šebestová	7–5, 7–6^{(2)}
Win	3–2	Apr 2025	ITF Monastir, Tunisia	W15	Hard	(Denmark) Vilma Krebs Hyllested	(India) Zeel Desai (Russia) Anastasiia Gureva	6–0, 5–7, [10–5]
Win	4–2	Jun 2025	ITF Gdańsk, Poland	W15	Clay	(New Zealand) Valentina Ivanov	(Poland) Nadia Affelt (Poland) Inka Wawrzkiewicz	7–5, 3–6, [12–10]
Loss	4–3	Sep 2025	ITF Haren, Netherlands	W15	Clay	(Denmark) Rebecca Munk Mortensen	(Netherlands) Joy de Zeeuw (Netherlands) Sarah van Emst	2–6, 6–3, [10–12]
