= Robin Anderson (tennis) =

American tennis player (born 1993)

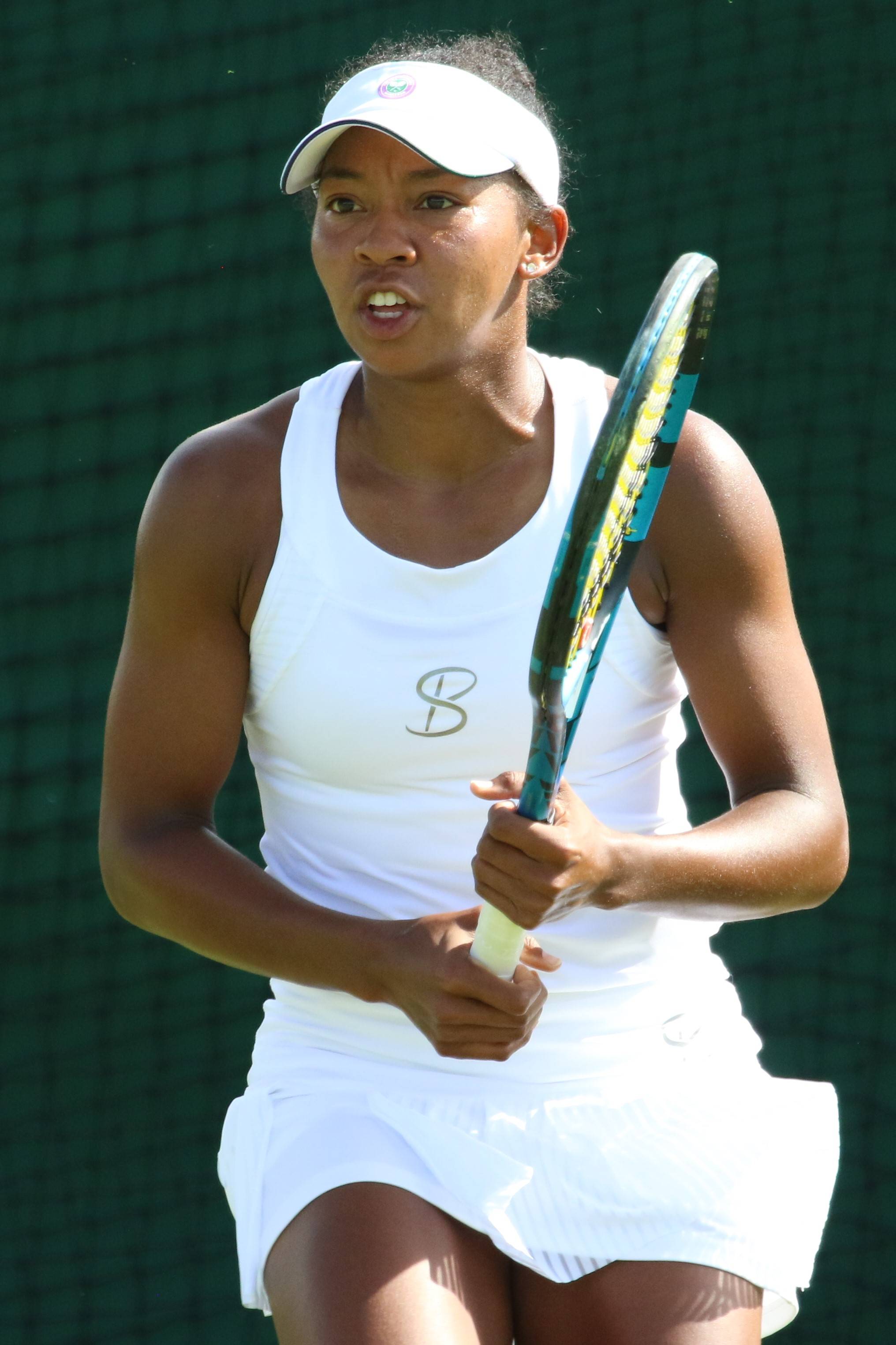
- Anderson at the 2022 Wimbledon Championships
- Full name: Robin Kimberly Anderson
- Country (sports): United States
- Residence: Matawan, New Jersey
- Born: April 12, 1993 (age 33) Long Branch, New Jersey
- Plays: Right (two-handed backhand)
- College: UCLA
- Prize money: $657,453

Singles
- Career record: 315–231
- Career titles: 6 ITF
- Highest ranking: No. 137 (June 6, 2022)
- Current ranking: No. 607 (May 18, 2026)

Grand Slam singles results
- Australian Open: 1R (2022)
- French Open: Q2 (2019)
- Wimbledon: Q2 (2016, 2022)
- US Open: Q2 (2019, 2021)

Doubles
- Career record: 165–116
- Career titles: 11 ITF
- Highest ranking: No. 181 (May 7, 2022)
- Current ranking: No. 750 (May 18, 2026)
- Last updated on: May 21, 2026.

Robin Kimberly Anderson (born April 12, 1993) is an inactive American tennis player.

== Personal life ==
Anderson's parents are Denom and Trudy Anderson, and she has two siblings, Matthew and Samantha.

== Career ==
=== College ===
Anderson attended UCLA from 2011 to 2015, where she was on the tennis team each year, leading the Bruins to the NCAA championship in 2014. She won the Honda Sports Award as the nation's best collegiate female tennis player in 2014, and earned the award as well in the following year, 2015.

=== Professional ===
Anderson reached her first WTA 125 singles final at the 2021 Midland Tennis Classic, losing to top seed Madison Brengle.

She received a wildcard into the main draw of the 2022 Australian Open on her Grand Slam tournament debut, after winning the USTA's Australian Open Wildcard Challenge, but lost in the first round to Sam Stosur.

Partnering Dalayna Hewitt, Anderson was runner-up at the 2024 W75 Calgary National Bank Challenger, losing to Kayla Cross and Maribella Zamarripa in a champions tiebreak in the final.

== WTA 125 finals ==
=== Singles: 1 (runner-up) ===
Result	W–L	Date	Tournament	Surface	Opponent	Score
Loss	0–1	Nov 2021	Midland Tennis Classic, United States	Hard (i)	(United States) Madison Brengle	2–6, 4–6

== ITF Circuit finals ==
=== Singles: 19 (6 titles, 13 runner-ups) ===
Legend W100 tournaments (0–1) W60 tournaments (2–2) W50 tournaments (0–2) W25/35 tournaments (3–8) W10 tournaments (1–0)	Finals by surface Hard (6–11) Clay (0–1) Carpet (0–1)

Result	W–L	Date	Tournament	Tier	Surface	Opponent	Score
Win	1–0	May 2011	Landisville Tennis Challenge, United States	10,000	Hard	(Australia) Bojana Bobusic	6–2, 6–3
Loss	1–1	Sep 2013	ITF Redding, US	25,000	Hard	(Venezuela) Adriana Pérez	6–2, 2–6, 1–6
Loss	1–2	Aug 2015	Landisville Challenge, US	25,000	Hard	(United Kingdom) Naomi Broady	6–4, 4–6, 6–7^{(5)}
Loss	1–3	Feb 2016	Midland Classic, US	100,000	Hard (i)	(United Kingdom) Naomi Broady	7–6^{(6)}, 0–6, 2–6
Win	2–3	Sep 2017	ITF Redding, US	25,000	Hard	(South Africa) Chanel Simmonds	6–1, 6–4
Loss	2–4	Aug 2018	ITF Fort Worth, US	25,000	Hard	(United States) Maria Mateas	3–6, 5–7
Loss	2–5	Sep 2018	ITF Lubbock, US	25,000	Hard	(Canada) Rebecca Marino	4–6, 1–6
Loss	2–6	Mar 2019	Open de Seine-et-Marne, France	W60	Hard (i)	(Russia) Vitalia Diatchenko	2–6, 3–6
Loss	2–7	Oct 2019	Challenger de Saguenay, Canada	W60	Hard (i)	(Netherlands) Indy de Vroome	6–3, 4–6, 5–7
Loss	2–8	Feb 2021	ITF Orlando, US	W25	Hard	(United Kingdom) Katie Swan	1–6, 3–6
Win	3–8	Jun 2021	ITF Madrid, Spain	W25	Hard	(Australia) Olivia Gadecki	6–3, 6–7^{(3)}, 7–6^{(8)}
Win	4–8	May 2022	ITF Orlando Pro, US	W60	Hard	(United States) Sachia Vickery	7–5, 6–4
Win	5–8	Oct 2022	Toronto Challenger, Canada	W60	Hard (i)	(South Korea) Jang Su-jeong	6–2, 6–4
Loss	5–9	Nov 2023	ITF Lousada, Portugal	W25	Hard (i)	(Australia) Arina Rodionova	6–1, 3–6, 4–6
Loss	5–10	Mar 2024	ITF Solarino, Italy	W35	Carpet	(Slovakia) Viktória Hrunčáková	2–6, 3–6
Loss	5–11	Jul 2024	Dallas Summer Series, US	W50	Hard (i)	(United States) Clervie Ngounoue	6–2, 3–6, 5–7
Win	6–11	Sep 2024	ITF San Rafael, US	W35	Hard	(United States) Ashley Kratzer	7–6^{(6)}, 6–2
Loss	6–12	May 2025	ITF Pelham, US	W50	Clay	(Romania) Gabriela Lee	3–6, 1–6
Loss	6–13	Jul 2025	ITF Florence, US	W35	Hard	(United States) Amelia Honer	3–6, 6–7^{(3)}

=== Doubles: 24 (11 titles, 13 runner-ups) ===
Legend W100 tournaments (0–1) W80 tournaments (1–0) W50/60/75 tournaments (4–8) W40/50 tournaments (0–2) W25/35 tournaments (6–2)	Finals by surface Hard (8–8) Clay (3–3) Grass (0–2)

Result	W–L	Date	Tournament	Tier	Surface	Partner	Opponents	Score
Loss	0–1	Jul 2013	Sacramento Challenger, United States	50,000	Hard	(United States) Lauren Embree	(United Kingdom) Naomi Broady (Australia) Storm Sanders	3–6, 4–6
Win	1–1	Sep 2013	ITF Redding, US	25,000	Hard	(United States) Lauren Embree	(United States) Jacqueline Cako (United States) Allie Kiick	6–4, 5–7, [10–7]
Loss	1–2	Jul 2015	ITF El Paso, US	25,000	Hard	(United States) Maegan Manasse	(United States) Jennifer Brady (Chile) Alexa Guarachi	6–3, 3–6, [7–10]
Loss	1–3	Jun 2016	Surbiton Trophy, United Kingdom	50,000	Grass	(Australia) Alison Bai	(United States) Sanaz Marand (United States) Melanie Oudin	4–6, 5–7
Loss	1–4	Jul 2016	Stockton Challenger, US	50,000	Hard	(United States) Maegan Manasse	(Czech Republic) Kristýna Plíšková (Belgium) Alison Van Uytvanck	2–6, 3–6
Win	2–4	Jan 2017	ITF Daytona Beach, US	25,000	Clay	(Ukraine) Anhelina Kalinina	(Poland) Paula Kania (Poland) Katarzyna Piter	6–4, 6–1
Win	3–4	June 2018	ITF Bethany Beach, US	25,000	Clay	(United States) Maegan Manasse	(United States) Quinn Gleason (United States) Sanaz Marand	2–6, 7–6^{(6)}, [10–3]
Win	4–4	Mar 2019	ITF Osaka, Japan	W25	Hard	(United States) Maegan Manasse	(Japan) Risa Ushijima (Japan) Minori Yonehara	7–6^{(2)}, 6–3
Loss	4–5	Jun 2019	Bella Cup Toruń, Poland	W60	Clay	(Ukraine) Anhelina Kalinina	(Spain) Rebeka Masarova (Slovakia) Rebecca Šramková	4–6, 6–3, [4–10]
Loss	4–6	Jun 2019	Manchester Trophy, UK	W100	Grass	(Romania) Laura Ioana Paar	(China) Duan Yingying (China) Zhu Lin	4–6, 3–6
Win	5–6	Aug 2019	Lexington Challenger, US	W60	Hard	(France) Jessika Ponchet	(United States) Ann Li (United States) Jamie Loeb	7–6^{(4)}, 6–7^{(5)}, [10–7]
Win	6–6	Nov 2019	Toronto Challenger, Canada	W60	Hard (i)	(France) Jessika Ponchet	(Canada) Mélodie Collard (Canada) Leylah Fernandez	7–6^{(7)}, 6–2
Win	7–6	Oct 2020	ITF Cherbourg, France	W25	Hard (i)	(France) Jessika Ponchet	(United Kingdom) Harriet Dart (United Kingdom) Sarah Beth Grey	4–6, 6–4, [10–8]
Win	8–6	Oct 2021	ITF Le Neubourg, France	W80+H	Hard	(France) Amandine Hesse	(France) Estelle Cascino (United Kingdom) Sarah Beth Grey	6–3, 7–6^{(2)}
Loss	8–7	Oct 2021	ITF Florence, US	W25	Hard	(Australia) Elysia Bolton	(United Kingdom) Emily Appleton (Japan) Yuriko Miyazaki	3–6, 6–1, [8–10]
Loss	8–8	Jan 2023	Canberra International, Australia	W60	Hard	(United States) Hailey Baptiste	(Russia) Irina Khromacheva (Russia) Anastasia Tikhonova	4–6, 5–7
Loss	8–9	May 2023	ITF Pelham, US	W60	Clay	(Australia) Elysia Bolton	(United States) Makenna Jones (United States) Jamie Loeb	4–6, 5–7
Loss	8–10	Jun 2023	ITF Palma del Río, Spain	W40	Hard	(Australia) Elysia Bolton	(Venezuela) Andrea Gámiz (United States) Sofia Sewing	3–6, 2–6
Loss	8–11	Oct 2023	Georgia's Rome Open, US	W60	Hard (i)	(Mexico) Fernanda Contreras Gómez	(United States) Sofia Sewing (Russia) Anastasia Tikhonova	6–4, 3–6, [7–10]
Win	9–11	Oct 2023	Challenger de Saguenay, Canada	W60	Hard (i)	(United States) Dalayna Hewitt	(Canada) Mia Kupres (Denmark) Johanne Svendsen	6–1, 6–4
Win	10–11	Sep 2024	ITF San Rafael, US	W35	Hard	(United States) Alana Smith	(United States) Makenna Jones (United States) Jamie Loeb	7–5, 6–2
Loss	10–12	Oct 2024	Calgary Challenger, Canada	W75	Hard (i)	(United States) Dalayna Hewitt	(Canada) Kayla Cross (United States) Maribella Zamarripa	7–6^{(3)}, 5–7, [10–12]
Loss	10–13	Mar 2025	Vacaria Open, Brazil	W50	Clay (i)	(Spain) Alicia Herrero Liñana	(Czech Republic) Michaela Bayerlová (Italy) Miriana Tona	7–6^{(4)}, 6–7^{(5)}, [7–10]
Win	11–13	Mar 2025	Vacaria Open, Brazil	W75	Clay (i)	(Spain) Alicia Herrero Liñana	(Greece) Despina Papamichail (Argentina) Julia Riera	7–5, 6–4
