= Jessica Pegula career statistics =

Career finals
Discipline	Type	Won	Lost	Total
Singles	Grand Slam	–	1	1
Singles	WTA Finals	–	1	1
Singles	WTA 1000 (Note: Formerly known as: Category 4 & 5 & 6 (until 1990); Tier I (until 2009); WTA Premier Mandatory and 5 (until 2021))	4	5	9
Singles	WTA 500 (Note: Formerly known as: Category 3 (until 1990); Tier II (until 2009); WTA Premier (until 2021))	4	5	9
Singles	WTA 250 (Note: Formerly known as: Category 1 & 2 (until 1990); Tier III & IV & V (until 2009); WTA International (until 2021))	3	2	5
Singles	Olympics	–	–	–
Singles	Total	11	14	25
Doubles	Grand Slam	–	1	1
Doubles	WTA Finals	–	–	–
Doubles	WTA 1000	3	3	6
Doubles	WTA 500	2	1	3
Doubles	WTA 250	2	–	2
Doubles	Olympics	–	–	–
Doubles	Total	7	5	12
Mixed	Grand Slam	–	1	1
Mixed	Total	0	1	1

This is a list of the main career statistics of American tennis player Jessica Pegula.

== Performance timelines ==
Key
W	F	SF	QF	#R	RR	Q#	P#	DNQ	A	Z#	PO	G	S	B	NMS	NTI	P	NH

(W) winner; (F) finalist; (SF) semifinalist; (QF) quarterfinalist; (#R) rounds 4, 3, 2, 1; (RR) round-robin stage; (Q#) qualification round; (P#) preliminary round; (DNQ) did not qualify; (A) absent; (Z#) Davis/Fed Cup Zonal Group (with number indication) or (PO) play-off; (G) gold, (S) silver or (B) bronze Olympic/Paralympic medal; (NMS) not a Masters tournament; (NTI) not a Tier I tournament; (P) postponed; (NH) not held; (SR) strike rate (events won / competed); (W–L) win–loss record.
To avoid confusion and double counting, these charts are updated at the conclusion of a tournament or when the player's participation has ended.

Only main-draw results in WTA Tour, Grand Slam tournaments, Billie Jean King Cup (Fed Cup), United Cup, Hopman Cup and Olympic Games are included in Win–Loss records.

=== Singles ===
Current through the 2026 China Open.

Tournament	2011	2012	2013	2014	2015	2016	2017	2018	2019	2020	2021	2022	2023	2024	2025	2026	SR	W–L	Win %
Grand Slam tournaments
Australian Open	A	A	Q1	A	A	Q2	A	A	A	1R	QF	QF	QF	2R	3R	SF	0 / 7	20–7	74%
French Open	A	A	Q2	A	Q3	Q1	A	A	1R	1R	3R	QF	3R	A	4R	1R	0 / 7	11–7	61%
Wimbledon	A	A	Q1	A	Q3	Q2	A	A	1R	NH	2R	3R	QF	2R	1R	QF	0 / 7	12–7	63%
US Open	Q2	Q2	A	A	2R	1R	Q1	Q3	1R	3R	3R	QF	4R	F	SF	SF	0 / 10	28–10	74%
Win–Loss	0–0	0–0	0–0	0–0	1–1	0–1	0–0	0–0	0–3	2–3	9–4	14–4	13–4	8–3	10–4	14–4	0 / 31	71–31	70%
Year-end championships
WTA Finals	Did not qualify									NH	Alt	RR	F	RR	SF	SF	0 / 5	8–10	44%
National representation
Billie Jean King Cup	A	A	A	A	A	A	A	A	QF	A (Note: Edition is split into two years due to COVID-19.)		RR	RR	1R	F		0 / 5	8–3	73%
Summer Olympics	NH	A	Not Held			A	Not Held				1R	Not Held		2R	Not Held		0 / 2	1–2	33%
WTA 1000 tournaments
Qatar Open	NTI	A	A	A	NTI	A	NTI	A	NTI	A	NTI	3R	NTI	A	QF	A	0 / 2	4–2	67%
Dubai Championships	A	Not Tier I			A	NTI	A	NTI	A	NTI	QF	NTI	SF	A	3R	W	1 / 4	11–3	79%
Indian Wells Open	A	1R	Q1	A	Q1	Q1	A	A	2R	NH	QF	2R	4R	2R	4R	QF	0 / 8	11–8	58%
Miami Open	A	A	A	A	A	A	A	A	1R	NH	4R	SF	SF	QF	F	QF	0 / 7	21–7	75%
Madrid Open	A	A	A	A	A	A	A	A	Q2	NH	3R	F	QF	A	3R	3R	0 / 5	11–5	69%
Italian Open	A	A	A	A	A	A	A	A	A	A	QF	3R	2R	A	3R	QF	0 / 5	8–5	62%
Canadian Open	A	A	Q1	A	A	A	A	A	A	NH	SF	SF	W	W	3R	4R	2 / 6	20–4	83%
Cincinnati Open	A	A	A	A	A	Q1	A	A	1R	QF	3R	QF	3R	F	3R	F	0 / 8	17–8	68%
China Open	A	A	A	A	A	A	A	A	1R	Not Held			3R	4R	SF	A	0 / 4	7–4	64%
Wuhan Open	Not Held			A	A	A	A	A	1R	Not Held				3R	F	2R	0 / 4	5–4	56%
Guadalajara Open	Not Held											W	A	Not Tier I			1 / 1	5–0	100%
Win–Loss	0–0	0–1	0–0	0–0	0–0	0–0	0–0	0–0	1–5	3–1	17–7	22–7	18–7	15–5	22–10	22–7	4 / 53	120–50	71%
Career statistics
	2011	2012	2013	2014	2015	2016	2017	2018	2019	2020	2021	2022	2023	2024	2025	2026	SR	W–L	Win %
Tournaments		2	4	0	4	3	1	1	14	6	19	19	19	19	23	17	Career total: 150		
Titles		0	0	0	0	0	0	0	1	0	0	1	2	2	3	2	Career total: 11		
Finals		0	0	0	0	0	0	1	1	1	0	2	5	4	6	5	Career total: 25		
Hard win–loss		0–2	0–2	0–0	2–2	5–3	0–1	4–1	6–7	10–5	26–12	29–16	45–12	31–12	38–16	36–11	7 / 102	232–102	69%
Clay win–loss		0–0	2–2	0–0	0–1	0–0	0–0	0–0	3–4	0–1	6–4	11–4	8–4	4–2	11–5	9–3	2 / 32	54–30	64%
Grass win–loss		0–0	0–0	0–0	0–1	0–0	0–0	0–0	0–2	NH	4–3	2–1	6–2	6–3	4–2	7–2	2 / 18	29–16	64%
Overall win–loss		0–2	2–4	0–0	2–4	5–3	0–1	4–1	9–13	10–6	36–19	42–21	59–18	41–17	53–23	52–16	11 / 152	315–148	68%
Win %		0%	33%	–	33%	63%	0%	80%	41%	63%	65%	67%	77%	71%	70%	76%	Career total: 68%		
Year-end ranking (Note: 2009: WTA ranking–922, 2010: WTA ranking–855.)		147	206	775	151	165	632	125	76	62	18	3	5	7	6	5	$23,837,508		

=== Doubles ===
Current through the 2026 China Open.

Tournament	2011	2012	2013	2014	2015	2016	...	2019	2020	2021	2022	2023	2024	2025	2026	SR	W–L	Win%
Grand Slam tournaments
Australian Open	A	A	A	A	A	A		A	2R	1R	2R	SF	A	A	1R	0 / 5	6–5	55%
French Open	A	A	A	A	A	A		3R	QF	2R	F	SF	A	A	A	0 / 5	15–5	75%
Wimbledon	A	A	A	A	A	A		1R	NH	3R	A	3R	QF	A	A	0 / 4	7–4	64%
US Open	3R	2R	A	A	1R	1R		1R	2R	1R	1R	QF	A	A	A	0 / 9	7–9	44%
Win–Loss	2–1	1–1	0–0	0–0	0–1	0–1		2–3	5–3	3–4	6–3	13–4	3–1	0–0	0–1	0 / 23	35–23	60%
Year-end championships
WTA Finals	Did not qualify							DNQ	NH	DNQ	RR	RR	DNQ			0 / 2	0–6	0%
National representation
Billie Jean King Cup	A	A	A	A	A	A		QF	A		RR	A	1R	F		0 / 3	2–1	67%
Summer Olympics	NH	A	Not Held			A		Not Held		QF	Not Held		2R	Not Held		0 / 2	3–2	60%
WTA 1000 tournaments
Qatar Open	NTI	A	A	A	NTI	A		NTI	A	NTI	W	NTI	A	1R	A	1 / 2	4–1	80%
Dubai Championships	A	Not Tier I			A	NTI		A	NTI	SF	NTI	QF	A	A	QF	0 / 3	6–3	67%
Indian Wells Open	A	A	A	A	A	A		A	NH	2R	2R	2R	QF	1R	1R	0 / 6	5–6	45%
Miami Open	A	A	A	A	A	A		A	NH	QF	1R	W	1R	2R	QF	1 / 6	9–5	64%
Madrid Open	A	A	A	A	A	A		A	NH	2R	QF	F	A	A	1R	0 / 4	6–4	60%
Italian Open	A	A	A	A	A	A		A	NH	1R	1R	F	A	A	SF	0 / 4	7–4	64%
Canadian Open	A	A	A	A	A	A		A	NH	1R	W	QF	QF	1R	1R	1 / 6	6–5	55%
Cincinnati Open	A	A	A	A	A	A		2R	QF	2R	A	A	A	2R	A	0 / 4	5–4	56%
China Open	A	A	A	A	A	A		A	Not Held			2R	1R	1R	A	0 / 3	0–3	0%
Wuhan Open	Not Held			A	A	A		A	Not Held				F	1R	1R	0 / 3	4–3	57%
Guadalajara Open	Not Held										QF	A	Not Tier I			0 / 1	1–1	50%
Win–Loss	0–0	0–0	0–0	0–0	0–0	0–0		1–1	2–1	8–7	10–5	16–5	6–4	2–7	6–7	3 / 42	53–38	58%
Career statistics
	2011	2012	2013	2014	2015	2016	...	2019	2020	2021	2022	2023	2024	2025	2026	SR	W–L	Win%
Tournaments	1	3	5	0	2	3		5	5	17	16	14	10	10	9	Career total: 97		
Titles	0	0	0	0	0	0		0	0	0	5	2	0	0	0	Career total: 7		
Finals	0	0	0	0	0	0		0	0	0	6	4	2	0	0	Career total: 12		
Hard Win–Loss	2–1	2–3	5–3	0–0	0–2	1–3		2–4	5–4	10–12	24–9	19–9	11–6	4–7	3–6	7 / 73	88–69	56%
Clay Win–Loss	0–0	0–0	0–2	0–0	0–0	0–0		2–1	3–1	2–3	7–4	12–3	1–1	0–1	3–3	0 / 21	30–17	64%
Grass Win–Loss	0–0	0–0	0–0	0–0	0–0	0–0		0–1	NH	3–2	0–0	4–1	3–3	1–1	0–0	0 / 9	11–8	58%
Overall Win–Loss	2–1	2–3	5–5	0–0	0–2	1–3		4–6	8–5	15–17	31–13	35–13	15–10	5–9	6–9	7 / 101	129–96	57%
Win %	67%	40%	50%	–	0%	25%		40%	62%	47%	70%	73%	60%	36%	40%	Career total: 57%		
Year-end ranking (Note: 2017: WTA ranking–318, 2018: WTA ranking–148.)	162	114	154	907	350	189		120	87	50	6	3	48	154				

== Grand Slam tournament finals ==
=== Singles: 1 (runner-up) ===
Result	Year	Tournament	Surface	Opponent	Score
Loss	2024	US Open	Hard	Aryna Sabalenka	5–7, 5–7

=== Doubles: 1 (runner-up) ===
Result	Year	Tournament	Surface	Partner	Opponents	Score
Loss	2022	French Open	Clay	(United States) Coco Gauff	(France) Caroline Garcia (France) Kristina Mladenovic	6–2, 3–6, 2–6

=== Mixed doubles: 1 (runner-up) ===
Result	Year	Tournament	Surface	Partner	Opponents	Score
Loss	2023	US Open	Hard	(United States) Austin Krajicek	(Kazakhstan) Anna Danilina (Finland) Harri Heliövaara	3–6, 4–6

== Other significant finals ==
=== Year-end championships ===
==== Singles: 1 (runner-up) ====
Result	Year	Tournament	Surface	Opponent	Score
Loss	2023	WTA Finals, Mexico	Hard	(Poland) Iga Świątek	1–6, 0–6

=== WTA 1000 tournaments ===
==== Singles: 9 (4 titles, 5 runner-ups) ====
Result	Year	Tournament	Surface	Opponent	Score
Loss	2022	Madrid Open	Clay	(Tunisia) Ons Jabeur	5–7, 6–0, 2–6
Win	2022	Guadalajara Open	Hard	(Greece) Maria Sakkari	6–2, 6–3
Win	2023	Canadian Open	Hard	Liudmila Samsonova	6–1, 6–0
Win	2024	Canadian Open (2)	Hard	(United States) Amanda Anisimova	6–3, 2–6, 6–1
Loss	2024	Cincinnati Open	Hard	Aryna Sabalenka	3–6, 5–7
Loss	2025	Miami Open	Hard	Aryna Sabalenka	5–7, 2–6
Loss	2025	Wuhan Open	Hard	(United States) Coco Gauff	4–6, 5–7
Win	2026	Dubai Championships	Hard	(Ukraine) Elina Svitolina	6–2, 6–4
Loss	2026	Cincinnati Open	Hard	(United States) Coco Gauff	2–6, 4–6

==== Doubles: 6 (3 titles, 3 runner-ups) ====
Result	Year	Tournament	Surface	Partner	Opponents	Score
Win	2022	Qatar Ladies Open	Hard	(United States) Coco Gauff	(Russia) Veronika Kudermetova (Belgium) Elise Mertens	3–6, 7–5, [10–5]
Win	2022	Canadian Open	Hard	(United States) Coco Gauff	(United States) Nicole Melichar-Martinez (Australia) Ellen Perez	6–4, 6–7^{(5–7)}, [10–5]
Win	2023	Miami Open	Hard	(United States) Coco Gauff	(Canada) Leylah Fernandez (United States) Taylor Townsend	7–6^{(8–6)}, 6–2
Loss	2023	Madrid Open	Clay	(United States) Coco Gauff	Victoria Azarenka (Brazil) Beatriz Haddad Maia	1–6, 4–6
Loss	2023	Italian Open	Clay	(United States) Coco Gauff	(Australia) Storm Hunter (Belgium) Elise Mertens	4–6, 4–6
Loss	2024	Wuhan Open	Hard	(United States) Asia Muhammad	Irina Khromacheva (Kazakhstan) Anna Danilina	3–6, 6–7^{(6–8)}

== WTA Tour finals ==
=== Singles: 25 (11 titles, 14 runner-ups) ===
Legend Grand Slam (0–1) WTA Finals (0–1) WTA 1000 (4–5) WTA 500 (4–5) International / WTA 250 (3–2)	Finals by surface Hard (7–11) Clay (2–1) Grass (2–1) Carpet (0–1)	Finals by setting Outdoor (11–13) Indoor (0–1)

Result	W–L	Date	Tournament	Tier	Surface	Opponent	Score
Loss	0–1	Sep 2018	Tournoi de Québec, Canada	International	Carpet (i)	(France) Pauline Parmentier	5–7, 2–6
Win	1–1	Aug 2019	Washington Open, United States	International	Hard	(Italy) Camila Giorgi	6–2, 6–2
Loss	1–2	Jan 2020	Auckland Open, New Zealand	International	Hard	(United States) Serena Williams	3–6, 4–6
Loss	1–3	May 2022	Madrid Open, Spain	WTA 1000	Clay	(Tunisia) Ons Jabeur	5–7, 6–0, 2–6
Win	2–3	Oct 2022	Guadalajara Open, Mexico	WTA 1000	Hard	(Greece) Maria Sakkari	6–2, 6–3
Loss	2–4	Feb 2023	Qatar Ladies Open, Qatar	WTA 500	Hard	(Poland) Iga Świątek	3–6, 0–6
Win	3–4	Aug 2023	Canadian Open, Canada	WTA 1000	Hard	Liudmila Samsonova	6–1, 6–0
Loss	3–5	Oct 2023	Pan Pacific Open, Japan	WTA 500	Hard	Veronika Kudermetova	5–7, 1–6
Win	4–5	Oct 2023	Korea Open, South Korea	WTA 250	Hard	(China) Yuan Yue	6–2, 6–3
Loss	4–6	Nov 2023	WTA Finals, Mexico	Finals	Hard	(Poland) Iga Świątek	1–6, 0–6
Win	5–6	Jun 2024	Berlin Open, Germany	WTA 500	Grass	Anna Kalinskaya	6–7^{(0–7)}, 6–4, 7–6^{(7–3)}
Win	6–6	Aug 2024	Canadian Open, Canada (2)	WTA 1000	Hard	(United States) Amanda Anisimova	6–3, 2–6, 6–1
Loss	6–7	Aug 2024	Cincinnati Open, United States	WTA 1000	Hard	Aryna Sabalenka	3–6, 5–7
Loss	6–8	Sep 2024	US Open, United States	Grand Slam	Hard	Aryna Sabalenka	5–7, 5–7
Loss	6–9	Jan 2025	Adelaide International, Australia	WTA 500	Hard	(United States) Madison Keys	3–6, 6–4, 1–6
Win	7–9	Mar 2025	ATX Open, United States	WTA 250	Hard	(United States) McCartney Kessler	7–5, 6–2
Loss	7–10	Mar 2025	Miami Open, United States	WTA 1000	Hard	Aryna Sabalenka	5–7, 2–6
Win	8–10	Apr 2025	Charleston Open, United States	WTA 500	Clay	(United States) Sofia Kenin	6–3, 7–5
Win	9–10	Jun 2025	Bad Homburg Open, Germany	WTA 500	Grass	(Poland) Iga Świątek	6–4, 7–5
Loss	9–11	Oct 2025	Wuhan Open, China	WTA 1000	Hard	(United States) Coco Gauff	4–6, 5–7
Win	10–11	Feb 2026	Dubai Open, UAE	WTA 1000	Hard	(Ukraine) Elina Svitolina	6–2, 6–4
Win	11–11	Apr 2026	Charleston Open, United States (2)	WTA 500	Clay	(Ukraine) Yuliia Starodubtseva	6–2, 6–2
Loss	11–12	Jun 2026	Berlin Open, Germany	WTA 500	Grass	(Czech Republic) Linda Nosková	4–6, 6–4, 3–6
Loss	11–13	Jul 2026	Washington Open, United States	WTA 500	Hard	(Philippines) Alexandra Eala	6–4, 4–6, 0–6
Loss	11–14	Aug 2026	Cincinnati Open, United States	WTA 1000	Hard	(United States) Coco Gauff	2–6, 4–6

=== Doubles: 12 (7 titles, 5 runner-ups) ===
Legend Grand Slam (0–1) WTA 1000 (3–3) WTA 500 (2–1) WTA 250 (2–0)	Finals by surface Hard (7–2) Clay (0–3)	Finals by setting Outdoor (7–5)

Result	W–L	Date	Tournament	Tier	Surface	Partner	Opponents	Score
Win	1–0	Jan 2022	Melbourne Summer Set, Australia	WTA 250	Hard	(United States) Asia Muhammad	(Italy) Sara Errani (Italy) Jasmine Paolini	6–3, 6–1
Win	2–0	Feb 2022	Qatar Ladies Open, Qatar	WTA 1000	Hard	(United States) Coco Gauff	(Russia) Veronika Kudermetova (Belgium) Elise Mertens	3–6, 7–5, [10–5]
Loss	2–1	Jun 2022	French Open, France	Grand Slam	Clay	(United States) Coco Gauff	(France) Caroline Garcia (France) Kristina Mladenovic	6–2, 3–6, 2–6
Win	3–1	Aug 2022	Washington Open, US	WTA 250	Hard	(New Zealand) Erin Routliffe	Anna Kalinskaya (United States) Caty McNally	6–3, 5–7, [12–10]
Win	4–1	Aug 2022	Canadian Open, Canada	WTA 1000	Hard	(United States) Coco Gauff	(United States) Nicole Melichar-Martinez (Australia) Ellen Perez	6–4, 6–7^{(5–7)}, [10–5]
Win	5–1	Oct 2022	San Diego Open, US	WTA 500	Hard	(United States) Coco Gauff	(Canada) Gabriela Dabrowski (Mexico) Giuliana Olmos	1–6, 7–5, [10–4]
Win	6–1	Feb 2023	Qatar Ladies Open (2)	WTA 500	Hard	(United States) Coco Gauff	(Ukraine) Lyudmyla Kichenok (Latvia) Jeļena Ostapenko	6–4, 2–6, [10–7]
Win	7–1	Mar 2023	Miami Open, United States	WTA 1000	Hard	(United States) Coco Gauff	(Canada) Leylah Fernandez (United States) Taylor Townsend	7–6^{(8–6)}, 6–2
Loss	7–2	May 2023	Madrid Open, Spain	WTA 1000	Clay	(United States) Coco Gauff	Victoria Azarenka (Brazil) Beatriz Haddad Maia	1–6, 4–6
Loss	7–3	May 2023	Italian Open, Italy	WTA 1000	Clay	(United States) Coco Gauff	(Australia) Storm Hunter (Belgium) Elise Mertens	4–6, 4–6
Loss	7–4	Mar 2024	San Diego Open, US	WTA 500	Hard	(United States) Desirae Krawczyk	(United States) Nicole Melichar-Martinez (Australia) Ellen Perez	1–6, 2–6
Loss	7–5	Oct 2024	Wuhan Open, China	WTA 1000	Hard	(United States) Asia Muhammad	Irina Khromacheva (Kazakhstan) Anna Danilina	3–6, 6–7^{(6–8)}

== WTA 125 finals ==
=== Singles: 1 (runner-up) ===
Result	Date	Tournament	Surface	Opponent	Score
Loss	Jan 2019	Newport Beach Challenger, US	Hard	(Canada) Bianca Andreescu	6–0, 4–6, 2–6

=== Doubles: 2 (1 title, 1 runner-up) ===
Result	W–L	Date	Tournament	Surface	Partner	Opponents	Score
Win	1–0	Nov 2018	Houston Challenger, US	Hard	(United States) Maegan Manasse	(United States) Desirae Krawczyk (Mexico) Giuliana Olmos	1–6, 6–4, [10–8]
Loss	1–1	Mar 2020	Indian Wells Challenger, US	Hard	(United States) Caty McNally	(United States) Asia Muhammad (United States) Taylor Townsend	4–6, 4–6

== ITF Circuit finals ==
=== Singles: 6 (6 runner-ups) ===
Legend $100,000 tournaments (0–2) $50/60,000 tournaments (0–2) $25,000 tournaments (0–1) $15,000 tournaments (0–1)	Finals by surface Hard (0–4) Clay (0–2)

Result	W–L	Date	Tournament	Tier	Surface	Opponent	Score
Loss	0–1	Jan 2011	ITF Lutz, United States	25,000	Clay	(Germany) Laura Siegemund	7–6^{(7–4)}, 1–6, 2–6
Loss	0–2	May 2012	Sacramento Challenger, US	50,000	Hard	(United States) Maria Sanchez	6–4, 3–6, 1–6
Loss	0–3	Aug 2012	Vancouver Open, Canada	100,000	Hard	(United States) Mallory Burdette	3–6, 0–6
Loss	0–4	Mar 2018	ITF Tampa, United States	15,000	Clay	(United States) Katerina Stewart	2–6, 3–6
Loss	0–5	Jul 2018	Championships of Honolulu, US	60,000	Hard	(Japan) Nao Hibino	0–6, 2–6
Loss	0–6	Feb 2019	Midland Tennis Classic, US	100,000	Hard (i)	(United States) Caty McNally	2–6, 4–6

=== Doubles: 17 (7 titles, 10 runner-ups) ===
Legend $100,000 tournaments (0–1) $75/80,000 tournaments (2–2) $50/60,000 tournaments (4–5) $25,000 tournaments (1–2)	Finals by surface Hard (6–8) Clay (1–2)

Result	W–L	Date	Tournament	Tier	Surface	Partner	Opponents	Score
Win	1–0	Oct 2011	Challenger de Saguenay, Canada	50,000	Hard (i)	(Hungary) Tímea Babos	(Canada) Gabriela Dabrowski (Canada) Marie-Ève Pelletier	6–4, 6–3
Loss	1–1	Nov 2011	Toronto Challenger, Canada	50,000	Hard (i)	(Hungary) Tímea Babos	(Canada) Gabriela Dabrowski (Canada) Marie-Ève Pelletier	5–7, 7–6^{(5)}, [4–10]
Loss	1–2	Jan 2012	ITF Plantation, United States	25,000	Clay	(United States) Ahsha Rolle	(Colombia) Catalina Castaño (France) Laura Thorpe	4–6, 2–6
Win	2–2	Apr 2012	Dothan Classic, United States	50,000	Clay	(Canada) Eugenie Bouchard	(Canada) Sharon Fichman (Canada) Marie-Ève Pelletier	6–4, 4–6, [10–5]
Win	3–2	May 2012	Kangaroo Cup Gifu, Japan	50,000	Hard	(China) Zheng Saisai	(Chinese Taipei) Chan Chin-wei (Chinese Taipei) Hsu Wen-hsin	6–4, 3–6, [10–4]
Loss	3–3	Nov 2012	Toronto Challenger, Canada	50,000	Hard (i)	(Canada) Eugenie Bouchard	(Canada) Gabriela Dabrowski (Russia) Alla Kudryavtseva	2–6, 6–7^{(2)}
Loss	3–4	Nov 2013	Toronto Challenger, Canada	50,000	Hard (i)	(United States) Melanie Oudin	(United States) Victoria Duval (Canada) Françoise Abanda	6–7^{(5)}, 6–2, [9–11]
Loss	3–5	Jan 2016	Championships of Maui, United States	50,000	Hard	(United States) Taylor Townsend	(United States) Asia Muhammad (United States) Maria Sanchez	2–6, 6–3, [6–10]
Loss	3–6	Feb 2016	Rancho Santa Fe Open, United States	25,000	Hard	(Canada) Carol Zhao	(United States) Asia Muhammad (United States) Taylor Townsend	3–6, 4–6
Loss	3–7	May 2016	ITF Indian Harbour Beach, United States	75,000	Clay	(United States) Maria Sanchez	(Israel) Julia Glushko (Russia) Alexandra Panova	5–7, 4–6
Win	4–7	Oct 2017	ITF Sumter, US	25,000	Hard	(United States) Taylor Townsend	(United States) Alexandra Mueller (United States) Caitlin Whoriskey	4–6, 7–5, [10–5]
Win	5–7	Nov 2017	Tyler Pro Challenge, US	80,000	Hard	(United States) Taylor Townsend	(United States) Jamie Loeb (Sweden) Rebecca Peterson	6–4, 6–1
Loss	5–8	Nov 2017	Waco Showdown, US	80,000	Hard	(United States) Taylor Townsend	(United States) Sofia Kenin (Russia) Anastasiya Komardina	5–7, 7–5, [9–11]
Loss	5–9	Feb 2018	Midland Tennis Classic, United States	100,000	Hard (i)	(United States) Maria Sanchez	(United States) Kaitlyn Christian (United States) Sabrina Santamaria	5–7, 6–4, [8–10]
Loss	5–10	Apr 2018	ITF Indian Harbour Beach, United States	60,000	Hard	(United States) Maria Sanchez	(Romania) Irina Bara (Spain) Sílvia Soler Espinosa	4–6, 2–6
Win	6–10	Jul 2018	Championships of Honolulu, US	60,000	Hard	(Japan) Misaki Doi	(United States) Taylor Johnson (United States) Ashley Lahey	7–6^{(4)}, 6–3
Win	7–10	Oct 2018	Tennis Classic of Macon, United States	80,000	Hard	(United States) Caty McNally	(Kazakhstan) Anna Danilina (United States) Ingrid Neel	6–1, 5–7, [11–9]

== WTA Tour career earnings ==
Current through the 2026 Wuhan Open.

Year	Titles			Earnings ($)	Rank
Year	Grand Slam	WTA	Total	Earnings ($)	Rank
2013	–	–	–	54,288	NA
2014	–	–	–	196	2,277
2015	–	–	–	135,912	162
2016	–	–	–	111,141	179
2017	–	–	–	16,659	443
2018	–	–	–	85,622	240
2019	–	1	1	394,451	108
2020	–	–	–	455,531	46
2021	–	–	–	1,439,421	17
2022	–	6	6	3,611,716	5
2023	–	4	4	4,320,890	5
2024	–	2	2	4,186,622	7
2025	–	3	3	5,262,311	6
2026	–	2	2	5,765,219	6
Career	0	18	18	27,632,854	15

- Note: Title counts include singles, doubles and mixed doubles titles.

== Career Grand Slam statistics ==
=== Best Grand Slam results details ===
Grand Slam winners are in boldface, and runner–ups are in italics.

==== Singles ====
**Australian Open**
**2026 (6th)**
Round	Opponent	Rank	Score
1R	Anastasia Zakharova	105	6–2, 6–1
2R	(United States) McCartney Kessler	37	6–0, 6–2
3R	Oksana Selekhmeteva	101	6–3, 6–2
4R	(United States) Madison Keys (9)	9	6–3, 6–4
QF	(United States) Amanda Anisimova (4)	4	6–2, 7–6^{(7–1)}
SF	**(Kazakhstan) Elena Rybakina (5)**	5	3–6, 6–7^{(7–9)}

**Wimbledon**
**2023 (4th)**
Round	Opponent	Rank	Score
1R	(United States) Lauren Davis	46	6–2, 6–7^{(8–10)}, 6–3
2R	(Spain) Cristina Bucșa	78	6–1, 6–4
3R	(Italy) Elisabetta Cocciaretto	43	6–4, 6–0
4R	(Ukraine) Lesia Tsurenko	60	6–1, 6–3
QF	**(Czech Republic) Markéta Vondroušová**	42	4–6, 6–2, 4–6

**French Open**
**2022 (11th)**
Round	Opponent	Rank	Score
1R	(China) Wang Qiang	129	6–2, 6–4
2R	(Ukraine) Anhelina Kalinina	36	6–1, 5–7, 6–4
3R	(Slovenia) Tamara Zidanšek (24)	25	6–1, 7–6^{(7–2)}
4R	(Romania) Irina-Camelia Begu	63	4–6, 6–2, 6–3
QF	**(Poland) Iga Świątek (1)**	1	3–6, 2–6

**US Open**
**2024 (6th)**
Round	Opponent	Rank	Score
1R	(United States) Shelby Rogers (PR)	356	6–4, 6–3
2R	(United States) Sofia Kenin	54	7–6^{(7–4)}, 6–3
3R	(Spain) Jéssica Bouzas Maneiro	74	6–3, 6–3
4R	Diana Shnaider (18)	18	6–4, 6–2
QF	(Poland) Iga Świątek (1)	1	6–2, 6–4
SF	(Czech Republic) Karolína Muchová	52	1–6, 6–4, 6–2
F	**Aryna Sabalenka (2)**	2	5–7, 5–7

=== Grand Slam tournament seedings ===
The tournaments won by Pegula are in boldface, and advanced into finals by Pegula are in italics.

==== Singles ====
Legend seeded No. 3 (0 / 5) seeded No. 4–10 (0 / 11) seeded No. 11–32 (0 / 5) unseeded (0 / 7) qualifier (0 / 2)	Longest streak 2 3 5 7 1

Year	Australian Open	French Open	Wimbledon	US Open
2011	A	A	A	DNQ
2012	A	A	A	DNQ
2013	DNQ	DNQ	DNQ	A
2014	A	A	A	A
2015	A	DNQ	DNQ	Q
2016	DNQ	DNQ	DNQ	Q
2017	A	A	A	DNQ
2018	A	A	A	DNQ
2019	A	–	–	–
2020	–	–	cancelled	–
2021	–	28th	22nd	23rd
2022	21st	11th	8th	8th
2023	3rd	3rd	4th	3rd
2024	5th	A	5th	6th (1)
2025	7th	3rd	3rd	4th
2026	6th	5th	4th	

- Key: (A) absent; (Q) qualifier; (DNQ) did not qualify; (RT) retired; (NH) Not Held; (–) unseeded; (LL) lucky looser; (PR) protect ranking.

==== Doubles ====
Legend seeded No. 1 (0 / 1) (Note: Pegula was seeded first but withdrew right before the tournament.) seeded No. 2 (0 / 4) seeded No. 3 (0 / 1) seeded No. 4–10 (0 / 1) seeded No. 11–32 (0 / 4) unseeded (0 / 7) wild card (0 / 5)	Longest streak 1 4 1 1 3 4 (Note: 2020 US Open was played before the 2020 French Open due to schedule change caused by COVID-19 outbreak) 1

Year	Australian Open	French Open	Wimbledon	US Open
2011	A	A	A	WC
2012	A	A	A	WC
...
2015	A	A	A	WC
2016	A	A	A	WC
2017	A	A	A	A
2019	A	–	–	–
2020	–	–	cancelled	WC
2021	–	–	14th	13th
2022	13th	8th (1)	A	2nd
2023	2nd	2nd	2nd	3rd
2024	~~1st~~	A	11th	A
2025	A	A	A	A
2026	–	A		

- Key: (A) absent; (Q) qualifier; (DNQ) did not qualify; (RT) retired; (NH) Not Held; (–) unseeded; (LL) lucky looser; (PR) protect ranking.

== Wins against top 10 players ==
- Pegula has a 35–38 record against players who were, at the time the match was played, ranked in the top 10.

No.	Player	Rk	Event	Surface	Rd	Score	Rk	Years	Ref
1.	(Ukraine) Elina Svitolina	5	Australian Open, Australia	Hard	4R	6–4, 3–6, 6–3	61	2021	
2.	(Czech Republic) Karolína Plíšková	6	Qatar Open, Qatar	Hard	QF	6–3, 6–1	44	2021	
3.	(Czech Republic) Karolína Plíšková	6	Dubai Championships, UAE	Hard	3R	6–0, 6–2	36	2021	
4.	(Czech Republic) Karolína Plíšková	6	Miami Open, United States	Hard	3R	6–1, 4–6, 6–4	33	2021	
5.	(Japan) Naomi Osaka	2	Italian Open, Italy	Clay	2R	7–6^{(7–2)}, 6–2	31	2021	
6.	(Czech Republic) Karolína Plíšková	10	Berlin Open, Germany	Grass	2R	7–5, 6–2	26	2021	
7.	(Ukraine) Elina Svitolina	7	Indian Wells Open, US	Hard	4R	6–1, 6–1	24	2021	
8.	(Greece) Maria Sakkari	8	Australian Open, Australia	Hard	4R	7–6^{(7–0)}, 6–3	21	2022	
9.	(Spain) Paula Badosa	6	Miami Open, United States	Hard	QF	4–1, ret.	21	2022	
10.	(Greece) Maria Sakkari	6	Guadalajara Open, Mexico	Hard	F	6–2, 6–3	5	2022	
11.	(Poland) Iga Świątek	1	United Cup, Australia	Hard	SF	6–2, 6–2	3	2023	
12.	(Greece) Maria Sakkari	7	Qatar Open, Qatar	Hard	SF	6–2, 4–6, 6–1	4	2023	
13.	(United States) Coco Gauff	7	Canadian Open	Hard	QF	6–2, 5–7, 7–5	3	2023	
14.	(Poland) Iga Świątek	1	Canadian Open, Canada	Hard	SF	6–2, 6–7^{(4–7)}, 6–4	3	2023	
15.	(Greece) Maria Sakkari	6	Pan Pacific Open, Japan	Hard	SF	6–2, 6–3	4	2023	
16.	(Kazakhstan) Elena Rybakina	4	WTA Finals, Mexico	Hard	RR	7–5, 6–2	5	2023	
17.	Aryna Sabalenka	1	WTA Finals, Mexico	Hard	RR	6–4, 6–3	5	2023	
18.	(Greece) Maria Sakkari	9	WTA Finals, Mexico	Hard	RR	6–3, 6–2	5	2023	
19.	(United States) Coco Gauff	3	WTA Finals, Mexico	Hard	SF	6–2, 6–1	5	2023	
20.	(United States) Coco Gauff	2	Berlin Open, Germany	Grass	SF	7–5, 7–6^{(7–2)}	5	2024	
21.	(Poland) Iga Świątek	1	US Open, United States	Hard	QF	6–2, 6–4	6	2024	
22.	(United States) Emma Navarro	10	Bad Homburg Open, Germany	Grass	QF	6–4, 1–6, 6–3	3	2025	
23.	(Poland) Iga Świątek	8	Bad Homburg Open, Germany	Grass	F	6–4, 7–5	3	2025	
24.	Aryna Sabalenka	1	Wuhan Open, China	Hard	SF	2–6, 6–4, 7–6^{(7–2)}	6	2025	
25.	(United States) Coco Gauff	3	WTA Finals, Saudi Arabia	Hard	RR	6–3, 6–7^{(4–7)}, 6–2	5	2025	
26.	(Italy) Jasmine Paolini	8	WTA Finals, Saudi Arabia	Hard	RR	6–2, 6–3	5	2025	
27.	(United States) Madison Keys	9	Australian Open	Hard	4R	6–3, 6–4	6	2026	
28.	(United States) Amanda Anisimova	4	Australian Open	Hard	QF	6–2, 7–6^{(7–1)}	6	2026	
29.	(United States) Amanda Anisimova	6	Dubai Championships, UAE	Hard	SF	1–6, 6–4, 6–3	5	2026	
30.	(Ukraine) Elina Svitolina	9	Dubai Championships, UAE	Hard	F	6–2, 6–4	5	2026	
31.	Aryna Sabalenka	1	Berlin Open, Germany	Grass	SF	6–4, 6–7^{(4–7)}, 6–0	4	2026	
32.	(United States) Amanda Anisimova	10	Cincinnati Open, United States	Hard	QF	6–4, 2–6, 7–6^{(7–4)}	3	2026	
33.	(Poland) Iga Świątek	5	Cincinnati Open, United States	Hard	SF	7–5, 4–6, 6–4	3	2026	
34	(Ukraine) Marta Kostyuk	10	WTA Finals, Indian Wells	Hard	RR	6–2, 7–5	5	2026	
35	(Czech Republic) Linda Noskova	8	WTA Finals, Indian Wells	Hard	RR	7–6^{(7–2)}, 4–6, 7–5	5	2026	

- Key: (Rk) first use, opponent rank; (Rd) round; (Rk) 2nd use, player rank; (Ref) reference; (F) final; (SF) semifinal; (QF) quarterfinal; (#R) rounds 4, 3, 2, 1; (RR) round-robin stage; (Q#) qualifying rounds or stages (3), 2, 1.

== Longest winning streaks ==
=== 9–match singles winning streak (2023) ===
#	Tournament	Tier	Start date	Surface	Round	Opponent	vsRank	Score	Rank
–	China Open, China	WTA 1000	30 September 2023	Hard	3R	(Latvia) Jeļena Ostapenko (13)	17	4–6, 2–6	4
1	Korea Open, South Korea	WTA 250	9 October 2023	Hard	1R	(Slovakia) Viktória Hrunčáková	112	6–2, 6–4	4
2	Korea Open, South Korea	WTA 250	9 October 2023	Hard	2R	(United States) Ashlyn Krueger	80	6–3, 6–1	4
3	Korea Open, South Korea	WTA 250	9 October 2023	Hard	QF	(United States) Claire Liu	98	4–6, 6–3, 6–0	4
4	Korea Open, South Korea	WTA 250	9 October 2023	Hard	SF	(Belgium) Yanina Wickmayer	83	6–4, 6–3	4
5	Korea Open, South Korea	WTA 250	9 October 2023	Hard	F	(China) Yuan Yue	128	6–2, 6–3	4
6	WTA Finals, Mexico	WTA Finals	29 October 2023	Hard	RR	(Greece) Maria Sakkari (8)	9	6–3, 6–2	5
7	WTA Finals, Mexico	WTA Finals	29 October 2023	Hard	RR	(Kazakhstan) Elena Rybakina (4)	4	7–5, 6–2	5
8	WTA Finals, Mexico	WTA Finals	29 October 2023	Hard	RR	Aryna Sabalenka (1)	1	6–4, 6–3	5
9	WTA Finals, Mexico	WTA Finals	29 October 2023	Hard	SF	(United States) Coco Gauff (3)	3	6–2, 6–1	5
–	WTA Finals, Mexico	WTA Finals	29 October 2023	Hard	F	(Poland) Iga Świątek (2)	2	1–6, 0–6	5

=== 9–match singles winning streak (2024) ===
#	Tournament	Tier	Start date	Surface	Round	Opponent	vsRank	Score	Rank
–	Paris Olympics	Olympics	27 July 2024	Clay	2R	(Ukraine) Elina Svitolina	31	6–4, 1–6, 3–6	6
1	Canadian Open	WTA 1000	6 August 2024	Hard	2R	(Czech Republic) Karolína Plíšková	45	7–5, 6–4	6
2	Canadian Open	WTA 1000	6 August 2024	Hard	3R	(United States) Ashlyn Krueger (Q)	82	6–2, 6–4	6
3	Canadian Open	WTA 1000	6 August 2024	Hard	QF	(United States) Peyton Stearns	53	6–4, 7–5	6
4	Canadian Open	WTA 1000	6 August 2024	Hard	SF	Diana Shnaider (14)	24	6–4, 6–3	6
5	Canadian Open	WTA 1000	6 August 2024	Hard	F	(United States) Amanda Anisimova (PR)	132	6–3, 2–6, 6–1	6
6	Cincinnati Open, US	WTA 1000	13 August 24	Hard	2R	(Czech Republic) Karolína Muchová	35	5–7, 6–4, 6–2	6
7	Cincinnati Open, US	WTA 1000	13 August 24	Hard	3R	(United States) Taylor Townsend (Q)	51	6–2, 6–3	6
8	Cincinnati Open, US	WTA 1000	13 August 24	Hard	QF	(Canada) Leylah Fernandez	26	7–5, 6–7^{(1–7)}, 7–6^{(7–3)}	6
9	Cincinnati Open, US	WTA 1000	13 August 24	Hard	SF	(Spain) Paula Badosa (PR)	36	6–2, 3–6, 6–3	6
–	Cincinnati Open, US	WTA 1000	13 August 24	Hard	F	Aryna Sabalenka (3)	3	3–6, 5–7	6

- Key: (Rk) first use, opponent rank; (Rd) round; (Rk) 2nd use, player rank; (Ref) reference; (F) final; (SF) semifinal; (QF) quarterfinal; (#R) rounds 4, 3, 2, 1; (RR) round-robin stage; (Q#) qualifying rounds or stages (3), 2, 1.

=== 9–match doubles winning streak (2023) ===
#	Tournament	Tier	Start date	Surface	Partner	Round	Opponent	vsRank	Score	Rank
–	Indian Wells Open, US	WTA 1000	6 March 2023	Hard	(United States) Coco Gauff	2R	(Japan) Miyu Kato (Indonesia) Aldila Sutjiadi	38; 32	4–6, 6–4, [10–12]	5
1	Miami Open, US	WTA 1000	20 March 2023	Hard	(United States) Coco Gauff	1R	(Czech Republic) Brenda Fruhvirtová (WC) (Czech Republic) Linda Fruhvirtová (WC)	616; 252	6–3, 4–6, [10–4]	5
2	Miami Open, US	WTA 1000	20 March 2023	Hard	(United States) Coco Gauff	2R	(Kazakhstan) Anna Danilina (United States) Asia Muhammad	27; 34	6–4, 7–6^{(7–4)}	5
3	Miami Open, US	WTA 1000	20 March 2023	Hard	(United States) Coco Gauff	QF	(Australia) Storm Hunter (6) (Belgium) Elise Mertens (6)	13; 10	6–7^{(4–7)}, 7–5, [10–2]	5
4	Miami Open, US	WTA 1000	20 March 2023	Hard	(United States) Coco Gauff	SF	(United States) Nicole Melichar-Martinez (8) (Australia) Ellen Perez (8)	15; 17	7–6^{(7–5)}, 7–6^{(7–4)}	5
5	Miami Open, US	WTA 1000	20 March 2023	Hard	(United States) Coco Gauff	F	(Canada) Leylah Fernandez (United States) Taylor Townsend	83; 19	7–6^{(8–6)}, 6–2	5
6	Madrid Open, Spain	WTA 1000	24 April 2023	Clay	(United States) Coco Gauff	1R	(Chile) Alexa Guarachi (New Zealand) Erin Routliffe	45; 33	7–6^{(7–5)}, 7–6^{(7–1)}	3
7	Madrid Open, Spain	WTA 1000	24 April 2023	Clay	(United States) Coco Gauff	2R	(Mexico) Giuliana Olmos; Alexandra Panova	6; 58	7–6^{(10–8)}, 6–3	3
8	Madrid Open, Spain	WTA 1000	24 April 2023	Clay	(United States) Coco Gauff	QF	(Canada) Gabriela Dabrowski (6) (Brazil) Luisa Stefani (6)	7; 25	6–4, 3–6, [10–5]	3
9	Madrid Open, Spain	WTA 1000	24 April 2023	Clay	(United States) Coco Gauff	SF	(Ukraine) Marta Kostyuk (Romania) Elena-Gabriela Ruse	32; 39	7–5, 7–6^{(7–5)}	3
–	Madrid Open, Spain	WTA 1000	24 April 2023	Clay	(United States) Coco Gauff	F	Victoria Azarenka (Brazil) Beatriz Haddad Maia	380; 20	1–6, 4–6	3
