= 2011 Tevlin Women's Challenger – Singles =

Singles
- 2011 Tevlin Women's Challenger

Final
- Champion: (Switzerland) Amra Sadiković
- Runner-up: (Canada) Gabriela Dabrowski
- Score: 6–4, 6–2

Events
| Singles | Doubles |
| ← 2010 · | Tevlin Women's Challenger | · 2012 → |

Heather Watson was the defending champion, but chose not to participate.

Amra Sadiković won the title defeating Gabriela Dabrowski in the final 6–4, 6–2.

== Seeds ==
1. (Croatia) Mirjana Lučić (first round)
2. (Luxembourg) Mandy Minella (quarterfinals)
3. (United States) Alexa Glatch (first round)
4. (United States) Julia Cohen (first round)
5. ~~(Canada) Sharon Fichman~~ (withdrew)
6. (Hungary) Tímea Babos (semifinals)
7. (Portugal) Michelle Larcher de Brito (first round)
8. (Slovenia) Petra Rampre (semifinals)

== Main draw ==
=== Key ===
- Q = Qualifier
- WC = Wild card
- LL = Lucky loser
- Alt = Alternate
- SE = Special exempt
- PR = Protected ranking
- ITF = ITF entry
- JE = Junior exempt
- w/o = Walkover
- r = Retired
- d = Defaulted
- SR = Special ranking

=== Finals ===
Semifinals
WC | (Canada) Gabriela Dabrowski | 6 | 4 | 6
8 | (Slovenia) Petra Rampre | 2 | 6 | 4
Q | (Switzerland) Amra Sadiković | 6 | 7
6 | (Hungary) Tímea Babos | 3 | 5

Final
WC | (Canada) Gabriela Dabrowski | 4 | 2
Q | (Switzerland) Amra Sadiković | 6 | 6

=== Top half ===
First round
1 | (Croatia) M Lučić | 6 | 3 | 1
(Slovenia) A Klepač | 3 | 6 | 6
(China) S Sun | 1 | 4
(Russia) E Bovina | 6 | 6
(France) A Lim | 4 | 3
WC | (Canada) G Dabrowski | 6 | 6
LL | (Russia) N Kukharchuk | 1 | 1
LL | (France) C Cattaneo | 6 | 6
4 | (United States) J Cohen | 3 | 4
(United States) J Boserup | 6 | 6
(United States) A Mueller | 6 | 6
(Brazil) MF Alves | 4 | 3
Q | (Croatia) M Abramović | 6 | 6
WC | (Canada) E Abanda | 4 | 3
WC | (Canada) K-A Surin | 2 | 2
8 | (Slovenia) P Rampre | 6 | 6

Second round
(Slovenia) A Klepač | 6 | 1 | 6
(Russia) E Bovina | 1 | 6 | 3
WC | (Canada) G Dabrowski | 6 | 6
LL | (France) C Cattaneo | 4 | 3
(United States) J Boserup | 3 | 3^{r}
(United States) A Mueller | 6 | 5
Q | (Croatia) M Abramović | 1 | 4
8 | (Slovenia) P Rampre | 6 | 6

Quarterfinals
(Slovenia) A Klepač | 3 | 0
WC | (Canada) G Dabrowski | 6 | 6
(United States) A Mueller | 4 | 3
8 | (Slovenia) P Rampre | 6 | 6

Semifinals
WC | (Canada) G Dabrowski | 6 | 4 | 6
8 | (Slovenia) P Rampre | 2 | 6 | 4

=== Bottom half ===
First round
7 | (Portugal) M Larcher de Brito | 3 | 3
Q | (Switzerland) A Sadiković | 6 | 6
Q | (United States) D Ospina | 3 | 2
(Canada) M-È Pelletier | 6 | 6
(United States) J Pegula | 4 | 2
(United States) A Fink | 6 | 6
(Canada) E Bouchard | 6 | 6
3 | (United States) A Glatch | 0 | 2
6 | (Hungary) T Babos | 6 | 6
(Brazil) N Rossi | 2 | 1
(Ukraine) I Buryachok | 5 | 1^{r}
(Austria) N Rottmann | 7 | 4
WC | (Canada) E Routliffe | 3 | 1
Q | (Canada) C Zhao | 6 | 6
LL | (United States) E Peters | 0 | 6^{7}
2 | (Luxembourg) M Minella | 6 | 7^{9}

Second round
Q | (Switzerland) A Sadiković | 3 | 7^{7} | 6
(Canada) M-È Pelletier | 6 | 6^{4} | 2
(United States) A Fink | 2 | 6^{6}
(Canada) E Bouchard | 6 | 7^{8}
6 | (Hungary) T Babos | 6 | 6
(Austria) N Rottmann | 3 | 3
Q | (Canada) C Zhao | 2 | 1
2 | (Luxembourg) M Minella | 6 | 6

Quarterfinals
Q | (Switzerland) A Sadiković | 6 | 6
(Canada) E Bouchard | 1 | 1
6 | (Hungary) T Babos | 6 | 6
2 | (Luxembourg) M Minella | 4 | 1

Semifinals
Q | (Switzerland) A Sadiković | 6 | 7
6 | (Hungary) T Babos | 3 | 5
