= 2022 Miami Open – Men's doubles =

Men's doubles
- 2022 Miami Open

Final
- Champions: (Poland) Hubert Hurkacz (United States) John Isner
- Runners-up: (Netherlands) Wesley Koolhof (United Kingdom) Neal Skupski
- Score: 7–6^{(7–5)}, 6–4

Events
Singles	men	women
Doubles	men	women
- Miami Open

Hubert Hurkacz and John Isner defeated Wesley Koolhof and Neal Skupski in the final, 7–6^{(7–5)}, 6–4 to win the men's doubles title at the 2022 Miami Open. Isner completed the Sunshine Double, having won the title at Indian Wells alongside Jack Sock. He became the first player to achieve the Sunshine Double in men's doubles since Pierre-Hugues Herbert and Nicolas Mahut in 2016.

Nikola Mektić and Mate Pavić were the defending champions, but lost in the second round to Rohan Bopanna and Denis Shapovalov.

Pavić and Joe Salisbury were in contention for the ATP No. 1 doubles ranking. Salisbury became the new world No. 1, after Pavić lost in the second round.

== Seeds ==
1. (Croatia) Nikola Mektić / (Croatia) Mate Pavić (second round)
2. (United States) Rajeev Ram / (United Kingdom) Joe Salisbury (quarterfinals)
3. (Spain) Marcel Granollers / (Argentina) Horacio Zeballos (quarterfinals)
4. (Australia) John Peers / (Slovakia) Filip Polášek (first round)
5. (Colombia) Juan Sebastián Cabal / (Colombia) Robert Farah (first round)
6. (Netherlands) Wesley Koolhof / (United Kingdom) Neal Skupski (final)
7. (United Kingdom) Jamie Murray / (Brazil) Bruno Soares (first round)
8. (France) Nicolas Mahut / (France) Fabrice Martin (first round)

== Draw ==
Key

- Q = Qualifier
- WC = Wild card
- LL = Lucky loser
- Alt = Alternate
- ITF = ITF entry
- PR = Protected ranking
- SR = Special ranking
- SE = Special exempt
- JE = Junior exempt
- JR = Junior Accelerator Programme entrant
- CO = College Accelerator Programme entrant
- NG = Next Gen Accelerator Program entrant
- w/o = Walkover
- r = Retired
- d = Defaulted

=== Finals ===
Semifinals
6	(Netherlands) Wesley Koolhof (United Kingdom) Neal Skupski	6	3	[10]
(Italy) Simone Bolelli (Italy) Fabio Fognini	1	6	[5]
WC	(Australia) Thanasi Kokkinakis (Australia) Nick Kyrgios	4	3
WC	(Poland) Hubert Hurkacz (United States) John Isner	6	6

Final
6	(Netherlands) Wesley Koolhof (United Kingdom) Neal Skupski	6^{5}	4
WC	(Poland) Hubert Hurkacz (United States) John Isner	7^{7}	6

=== Top half ===
First round
1	(Croatia) N Mektić (Croatia) M Pavić	7^{7}	6
(Georgia (country)) N Basilashvili (Serbia) L Đere	6^{3}	1
(India) R Bopanna (Canada) D Shapovalov	6^{5}	6	[10]
(El Salvador) M Arévalo (Netherlands) J-J Rojer	7^{7}	2	[3]
(Uruguay) A Behar (Ecuador) G Escobar	3	4
(Spain) P Martínez (Italy) L Sonego	6	6
(South Africa) L Harris (Netherlands) M Middelkoop	6^{6}	5
6	(Netherlands) W Koolhof (United Kingdom) N Skupski	7^{8}	7
4	(Australia) J Peers (Slovakia) F Polášek	2	4
(Italy) S Bolelli (Italy) F Fognini	6	6
(Belgium) S Gillé (Belgium) J Vliegen	4	1
(Croatia) I Dodig (Brazil) M Melo	6	6
(Australia) M Ebden (Australia) M Purcell	6	6
(Australia) A de Minaur (Spain) A Ramos Viñolas	3	0
(Argentina) F Delbonis (Argentina) M González	6^{4}	6	[10]
7	(United Kingdom) J Murray (Brazil) B Soares	7^{7}	4	[8]

Second round
1	(Croatia) N Mektić (Croatia) M Pavić	3	6^{3}
(India) R Bopanna (Canada) D Shapovalov	6	7^{7}
(Spain) P Martínez (Italy) L Sonego	3	6^{8}
6	(Netherlands) W Koolhof (United Kingdom) N Skupski	6	7^{10}
(Italy) S Bolelli (Italy) F Fognini	2	7^{7}	[10]
(Croatia) I Dodig (Brazil) M Melo	6	6^{4}	[8]
(Australia) M Ebden (Australia) M Purcell	1	6	[13]
(Argentina) F Delbonis (Argentina) M González	6	3	[15]

Quarterfinals
(India) R Bopanna (Canada) D Shapovalov	2	1
6	(Netherlands) W Koolhof (United Kingdom) N Skupski	6	6
(Italy) S Bolelli (Italy) F Fognini	4	6	[10]
(Argentina) F Delbonis (Argentina) M González	6	3	[7]

Semifinals
6	(Netherlands) W Koolhof (United Kingdom) N Skupski	6	3	[10]
(Italy) S Bolelli (Italy) F Fognini	1	6	[5]

=== Bottom half ===
First round
5	(Colombia) JS Cabal (Colombia) R Farah	5	7	[6]
K Khachanov; A Rublev	7	5	[10]
WC	(Australia) T Kokkinakis (Australia) N Kyrgios	6	6^{5}	[10]
(Mexico) S González (Argentina) A Molteni	2	7^{7}	[6]
(Bosnia and Herzegovina) T Brkić (Serbia) N Ćaćić	6	6
Alt	(Croatia) M Čilić (Poland) Ł Kubot	2	1
(South Africa) R Klaasen (Japan) B McLachlan	2	2
3	(Spain) M Granollers (Argentina) H Zeballos	6	6
8	(France) N Mahut (France) F Martin	3	4
PR	(United States) A Krajicek (France) É Roger-Vasselin	6	6
WC	(Poland) H Hurkacz (United States) J Isner	6	7^{7}
(Germany) K Krawietz (Germany) A Mies	3	6^{3}
WC	(Spain) F López (Greece) S Tsitsipas	7^{7}	6
(Kazakhstan) A Bublik (Kazakhstan) A Golubev	6^{2}	4
(United Kingdom) L Glasspool (New Zealand) M Venus	5	4
2	(United States) R Ram (United Kingdom) J Salisbury	7	6

Second round
K Khachanov; A Rublev
WC	(Australia) T Kokkinakis (Australia) N Kyrgios	w/o
(Bosnia and Herzegovina) T Brkić (Serbia) N Ćaćić	3	4
3	(Spain) M Granollers (Argentina) H Zeballos	6	6
PR	(United States) A Krajicek (France) É Roger-Vasselin	6	3	[6]
WC	(Poland) H Hurkacz (United States) J Isner	4	6	[10]
WC	(Spain) F López (Greece) S Tsitsipas	5	6^{2}
2	(United States) R Ram (United Kingdom) J Salisbury	7	7^{7}

Quarterfinals
WC	(Australia) T Kokkinakis (Australia) N Kyrgios	7	6
3	(Spain) M Granollers (Argentina) H Zeballos	5	2
WC	(Poland) H Hurkacz (United States) J Isner	7^{9}	6
2	(United States) R Ram (United Kingdom) J Salisbury	6^{7}	3

Semifinals
WC	(Australia) T Kokkinakis (Australia) N Kyrgios	4	3
WC	(Poland) H Hurkacz (United States) J Isner	6	6

== Seeded teams ==
The following are the seeded teams, based on ATP rankings as of March 21, 2022.

Country	Player	Country	Player	Rank	Seed
CRO	Nikola Mektić	CRO	Mate Pavić	4	1
USA	Rajeev Ram	GBR	Joe Salisbury	6	2
ESP	Marcel Granollers	ARG	Horacio Zeballos	11	3
AUS	John Peers	SVK	Filip Polášek	21	4
COL	Juan Sebastián Cabal	COL	Robert Farah	26	5
NED	Wesley Koolhof	GBR	Neal Skupski	33	6
GBR	Jamie Murray	BRA	Bruno Soares	38	7
FRA	Nicolas Mahut	FRA	Fabrice Martin	48	8

== Other entry information ==
=== Wildcards ===
- (Poland) Hubert Hurkacz / (United States) John Isner
- (Australia) Thanasi Kokkinakis / (Australia) Nick Kyrgios
- (Spain) Feliciano López / (Greece) Stefanos Tsitsipas

=== Alternates ===
- (Croatia) Marin Čilić / (Poland) Łukasz Kubot

=== Protected ranking ===
- (United States) Austin Krajicek / (France) Édouard Roger-Vasselin

=== Withdrawals ===
- Ilya Ivashka / Karen Khachanov → replaced by Karen Khachanov / Andrey Rublev
- (United States) Reilly Opelka / (Italy) Jannik Sinner → replaced by (Croatia) Marin Čilić / (Poland) Łukasz Kubot
- (Germany) Tim Pütz / (New Zealand) Michael Venus → replaced by (United Kingdom) Lloyd Glasspool / (New Zealand) Michael Venus
