= 2022 Miami Open – Men's singles =

Men's singles
- 2022 Miami Open

Final
- Champion: (Spain) Carlos Alcaraz
- Runner-up: (Norway) Casper Ruud
- Score: 7–5, 6–4

Details
- Draw: 96 (12 Q / 5 WC )
- Seeds: 32

Events
Singles	men	women
Doubles	men	women
- Miami Open

Carlos Alcaraz defeated Casper Ruud in the final, 7–5, 6–4 to win the men's singles tennis title at the 2022 Miami Open. It was his first Masters 1000 title, becoming the first Spaniard to win the Miami Open. At 18 years and 333 days old, Alcaraz became the youngest men's singles champion in tournament history (surpassing Novak Djokovic's record from 2007), and the youngest Masters 1000 champion overall since Rafael Nadal at the 2005 Monte Carlo Masters. Ruud was the first Norwegian to reach a Masters 1000 final, and the first Scandinavian to do so since Robin Söderling at the 2010 Paris Masters.

Hubert Hurkacz was the defending champion, but lost in the semifinals to Alcaraz.

By reaching the semifinals on his Masters 1000 debut, Francisco Cerúndolo was the first player to achieve the feat since Jerzy Janowicz at the 2012 Paris Masters. Ranked No. 103, Cerúndolo was the lowest-ranked semifinalist in tournament history.

Novak Djokovic and Daniil Medvedev were in contention for the world No. 1 singles ranking. Djokovic retained the top ranking after Medvedev lost in the quarterfinals to Hurkacz.

At the time, this tournament marked the final professional appearance of former world No. 5 and two-time major finalist Kevin Anderson, who lost in the second round to Juan Manuel Cerúndolo. Anderson returned to professional tennis 14 months later at the 2023 Hall of Fame Open.

== Seeds ==
All seeds received a bye into the second round.

1. Daniil Medvedev (quarterfinals)
2. (Germany) Alexander Zverev (quarterfinals)
3. (Greece) Stefanos Tsitsipas (fourth round)
4. (Italy) Matteo Berrettini (withdrew)
5. Andrey Rublev (second round)
6. (Norway) Casper Ruud (final)
7. (Canada) Félix Auger-Aliassime (second round)
8. (Poland) Hubert Hurkacz (semifinals)
9. (Italy) Jannik Sinner (quarterfinals, retired)
10. (United Kingdom) Cameron Norrie (fourth round)
11. (United States) Taylor Fritz (fourth round)
12. (Canada) Denis Shapovalov (second round)
13. (Argentina) Diego Schwartzman (second round)
14. (Spain) Carlos Alcaraz (champion)
15. (Spain) Roberto Bautista Agut (third round)
16. (United States) Reilly Opelka (second round, retired)

17. (Spain) Pablo Carreño Busta (third round)
18. (Georgia (country)) Nikoloz Basilashvili (second round)
19. (Italy) Lorenzo Sonego (second round)
20. (United States) John Isner (second round)
21. (Croatia) Marin Čilić (third round)
22. (France) Gaël Monfils (third round)
23. Karen Khachanov (second round)
24. (United Kingdom) Dan Evans (second round)
25. (Australia) Alex de Minaur (third round)
26. (Bulgaria) Grigor Dimitrov (second round)
27. (Chile) Cristian Garín (second round)
28. (United States) Frances Tiafoe (fourth round)
29. Aslan Karatsev (third round)
30. (Kazakhstan) Alexander Bublik (third round)
31. (Italy) Fabio Fognini (third round)
32. (Spain) Albert Ramos Viñolas (second round)

Click on the seed number of a player to go to their draw section.

== Draw ==
Key

- Q = Qualifier
- WC = Wild card
- LL = Lucky loser
- Alt = Alternate
- ITF = ITF entry
- PR = Protected ranking
- SR = Special ranking
- SE = Special exempt
- JE = Junior exempt
- JR = Junior Accelerator Programme entrant
- CO = College Accelerator Programme entrant
- NG = Next Gen Accelerator Program entrant
- w/o = Walkover
- r = Retired
- d = Defaulted

=== Finals ===
Quarterfinals
1	Daniil Medvedev	6^{7}	3
8	(Poland) Hubert Hurkacz	7^{9}	6
14	(Spain) Carlos Alcaraz	6^{5}	6	7^{7}
(Serbia) Miomir Kecmanović	7^{7}	3	6^{5}
9	(Italy) Jannik Sinner	1^{r}
(Argentina) Francisco Cerúndolo	4
6	(Norway) Casper Ruud	6	1	6
2	(Germany) Alexander Zverev	3	6	3

Semifinals
8	(Poland) Hubert Hurkacz	6^{5}	6^{2}
14	(Spain) Carlos Alcaraz	7^{7}	7^{7}
(Argentina) Francisco Cerúndolo	4	1
6	(Norway) Casper Ruud	6	6

Final
14	(Spain) Carlos Alcaraz	7	6
6	(Norway) Casper Ruud	5	4

=== Top half ===
==== Section 1 ====
First round
(Argentina) F Delbonis	6^{4}	1
WC	(United Kingdom) A Murray	7^{7}	6
(Spain) P Martínez	6	2
(Germany) J-L Struff	3	0^{r}
(United States) J Brooksby	3	6	6
(Argentina) F Coria	6	2	3
(Argentina) S Báez	4	3
(Poland) K Majchrzak	6	6

Second round
1	D Medvedev	6	6
WC	(United Kingdom) A Murray	4	2
(Spain) P Martínez	7^{7}	6
27	(Chile) C Garín	6^{2}	2
18	(Georgia (country)) N Basilashvili	3	1
(United States) J Brooksby	6	6
(Poland) K Majchrzak	3	3
15	(Spain) R Bautista Agut	6	6

Third round
1	D Medvedev	6	6
(Spain) P Martínez	3	4
(United States) J Brooksby	6	5	6
15	(Spain) R Bautista Agut	3	7	4

Fourth round
1	D Medvedev	7	6
(United States) J Brooksby	5	1

==== Section 2 ====
First round
(South Africa) L Harris	6	6
(Argentina) F Bagnis	3	3
Q	(Ecuador) E Gómez	2	7^{7}	1
Q	(Japan) Y Nishioka	6	6^{2}	6
PR	(Slovenia) A Bedene	3	6	3
(France) U Humbert	6	3	6
(Serbia) L Djere	2	6^{6}
(France) A Rinderknech	6	7^{8}

Second round
12	(Canada) D Shapovalov	3	4
(South Africa) L Harris	6	6
Q	(Japan) Y Nishioka	3	6	6
24	(United Kingdom) D Evans	6	4	3
29	A Karatsev	7	6
(France) U Humbert	5	2
(France) A Rinderknech	6^{5}	2
8	(Poland) H Hurkacz	7^{7}	6

Third round
(South Africa) L Harris	7^{7}	4	7
Q	(Japan) Y Nishioka	6^{5}	6	5
29	A Karatsev	5	6	3
8	(Poland) H Hurkacz	7	4	6

Fourth round
(South Africa) L Harris	6^{3}	2
8	(Poland) H Hurkacz	7^{7}	6

==== Section 3 ====
First round
(Germany) D Altmaier	4	4
Q	(United States) JJ Wolf	6	6
PR	(France) J-W Tsonga	7^{7}	4	4
(Australia) J Thompson	6^{1}	6	6
(Italy) L Musetti	5	6^{5}
(Australia) A Popyrin	7	7^{7}
(Hungary) M Fucsovics	6	6
(United States) M Giron	3	4

Second round
3	(Greece) S Tsitsipas	6	6^{5}	6
Q	(United States) JJ Wolf	4	7^{7}	1
(Australia) J Thompson	2	3
25	(Australia) A de Minaur	6	6
21	(Croatia) M Čilić	6	6
(Australia) A Popyrin	0	3
(Hungary) M Fucsovics	3	2
14	(Spain) C Alcaraz	6	6

Third round
3	(Greece) S Tsitsipas	6	6
25	(Australia) A de Minaur	4	3
21	(Croatia) M Čilić	4	4
14	(Spain) C Alcaraz	6	6

Fourth round
3	(Greece) S Tsitsipas	5	3
14	(Spain) C Alcaraz	7	6

==== Section 4 ====
First round
Q	(Kazakhstan) M Kukushkin	6	6
(Netherlands) B van de Zandschulp	4	4
(United States) T Paul	6	6
(France) B Bonzi	4	4
(United States) S Korda	6	6
(Spain) A Davidovich Fokina	1	1
Q	(United States) J Sock	6^{3}	4
(Serbia) M Kecmanović	7^{7}	6

Second round
11	(United States) T Fritz	6	5	6
Q	(Kazakhstan) M Kukushkin	3	7	3
(United States) T Paul	6	3	7^{7}
23	K Khachanov	4	6	6^{3}
32	(Spain) A Ramos Viñolas	6	6^{6}	3
(United States) S Korda	4	7^{8}	6
(Serbia) M Kecmanović	6	6
7	(Canada) F Auger-Aliassime	4	2

Third round
11	(United States) T Fritz	7^{7}	6
(United States) T Paul	6^{2}	4
(United States) S Korda	6^{4}	3
(Serbia) M Kecmanović	7^{7}	6

Fourth round
11	(United States) T Fritz	6	1	4
(Serbia) M Kecmanović	3	6	6

=== Bottom half ===
==== Section 5 ====
First round
WC	(Australia) N Kyrgios	7^{7}	6
(France) A Mannarino	6^{3}	3
Q	(Spain) J Munar	3	4
Q	(Japan) T Daniel	6	6
(Spain) R Carballés Baena	2	3
(Belgium) D Goffin	6	6
(United States) M Cressy	3	2
(Finland) E Ruusuvuori	6	6

Second round
5	A Rublev	3	0
WC	(Australia) N Kyrgios	6	6
Q	(Japan) T Daniel	7^{7}	2	6^{5}
31	(Italy) F Fognini	6^{1}	6	7^{7}
17	(Spain) P Carreño Busta	6	6
(Belgium) D Goffin	3	2
(Finland) E Ruusuvuori	4	6	6^{8}
9	(Italy) J Sinner	6	3	7^{10}

Third round
WC	(Australia) N Kyrgios	6	6
31	(Italy) F Fognini	2	4
17	(Spain) P Carreño Busta	7	5	5
9	(Italy) J Sinner	5	7	7

Fourth round
WC	(Australia) N Kyrgios	6^{3}	3
9	(Italy) J Sinner	7^{7}	6

==== Section 6 ====
First round
(Netherlands) T Griekspoor	5	6	3
(Argentina) F Cerúndolo	7	4	6
(Germany) O Otte	6	6
Q	(United States) M Krueger	3	4
(South Korea) S-w Kwon	1	5
(United States) B Nakashima	6	7
(Argentina) JM Cerúndolo	6	7
(Serbia) D Lajović	3	5

Second round
16	(United States) R Opelka	1	1^{r}
(Argentina) F Cerúndolo	6	3
(Germany) O Otte	6^{9}	1
22	(France) G Monfils	7^{11}	6
28	(United States) F Tiafoe	3	7^{7}	6
(United States) B Nakashima	6	6^{5}	4
(Argentina) JM Cerúndolo	7^{9}	3	6
LL	(South Africa) K Anderson	6^{7}	6	3

Third round
(Argentina) F Cerúndolo	6	6
22	(France) G Monfils	2	3
28	(United States) F Tiafoe	6	6
(Argentina) JM Cerúndolo	3	2

Fourth round
(Argentina) F Cerúndolo	6^{2}	7^{7}	6
28	(United States) F Tiafoe	7^{7}	6^{3}	2

==== Section 7 ====
First round
(Switzerland) H Laaksonen	7^{10}	1	6
(France) B Paire	6^{8}	6	4
Q	(Colombia) DE Galán	6	6
(Australia) J Millman	4	2
WC	(United States) E Nava	2	1
(France) H Gaston	6	6
PR	(France) G Simon	5	1
WC	(United Kingdom) J Draper	7	6

Second round
6	(Norway) C Ruud	6	6
(Switzerland) H Laaksonen	1	2
Q	(Colombia) DE Galán	7^{9}	3	4
30	(Kazakhstan) A Bublik	6^{7}	6	6
20	(United States) J Isner	6^{5}	4
(France) H Gaston	7^{7}	6
WC	(United Kingdom) J Draper	6^{5}	4
10	(United Kingdom) C Norrie	7^{7}	6

Third round
6	(Norway) C Ruud	6	6
30	(Kazakhstan) A Bublik	3	2
(France) H Gaston	3	5
10	(United Kingdom) C Norrie	6	7

Fourth round
6	(Norway) C Ruud	6	6
10	(United Kingdom) C Norrie	3	4

==== Section 8 ====
First round
Q	(Australia) T Kokkinakis	6	6
(France) R Gasquet	4	2
WC	(China) J Shang	7^{7}	5	4
Q	(United States) D Kudla	6^{3}	7	6
(United States) M McDonald	6^{8}	6	6
(Germany) D Koepfer	7^{10}	4	4
PR	(Croatia) B Ćorić	6	7
Q	(Spain) F Verdasco	4	5

Second round
13	(Argentina) D Schwartzman	6	6^{3}	4
Q	(Australia) T Kokkinakis	4	7^{7}	6
Q	(United States) D Kudla	3	7^{7}	6
19	(Italy) L Sonego	6	6^{5}	4
26	(Bulgaria) G Dimitrov	1	4
(United States) M McDonald	6	6
PR	(Croatia) B Ćorić	4	6	3
2	(Germany) A Zverev	6	3	6

Third round
Q	(Australia) T Kokkinakis	7^{7}	4	7^{7}
Q	(United States) D Kudla	6^{5}	6	6^{4}
(United States) M McDonald	2	2
2	(Germany) A Zverev	6	6

Fourth round
Q	(Australia) T Kokkinakis	4	4
2	(Germany) A Zverev	6	6

== Seeded players ==
The following are the seeded players. Seedings are based on ATP rankings as of March 21, 2022. Rankings and points before are as of March 21, 2022.

As a result of special ranking adjustment rules due to the COVID-19 pandemic, players are defending the higher of (i) their points from the 2021 tournament or (ii) the remaining 50% of their points from the 2019 tournament. Those points were not mandatory and are included in the table below only if they counted towards the player's ranking as of March 21, 2022. Players who are not defending points from the 2021 or 2019 tournaments will instead have their 19th best result replaced by their points from the 2022 tournament.

Seed	Rank	Player	Points before	Points defending (or 19th best result)^{†}	Points won	Points after	Status
1	2	Daniil Medvedev	8,410	180	180	8,410	Quarterfinals lost to (Poland) Hubert Hurkacz [8]
2	4	(Germany) Alexander Zverev	7,025	10	180	7,195	Quarterfinals lost to (Norway) Casper Ruud [6]
3	5	(Greece) Stefanos Tsitsipas	6,070	180	90	5,980	Fourth round lost to (Spain) Carlos Alcaraz [14]
4	6	(Italy) Matteo Berrettini	4,955	(10)	0	4,945	Withdrew due to right hand injury
5	7	Andrey Rublev	4,725	360	10	4,375	Second round lost to (Australia) Nick Kyrgios [WC]
6	8	(Norway) Casper Ruud	3,870	(90)	600	4,380	Runner-up, lost to (Spain) Carlos Alcaraz [14]
7	9	(Canada) Félix Auger-Aliassime	3,803	188	10	3,625	Second round lost to (Serbia) Miomir Kecmanović
8	10	(Poland) Hubert Hurkacz	3,513	1,000	360	2,873	Semifinals lost to (Spain) Carlos Alcaraz [14]
9	11	(Italy) Jannik Sinner	3,474	600	180	3,054	Quarterfinals retired against (Argentina) Francisco Cerúndolo
10	12	(United Kingdom) Cameron Norrie	3,395	45	90	3,440	Fourth round lost to (Norway) Casper Ruud [6]
11	13	(United States) Taylor Fritz	2,920	90	90	2,920	Fourth round lost to (Serbia) Miomir Kecmanović
12	14	(Canada) Denis Shapovalov	2,863	180	10	2,693	Second round lost to (South Africa) Lloyd Harris
13	15	(Argentina) Diego Schwartzman	2,660	90	10	2,580	Second round lost to (Australia) Thanasi Kokkinakis [Q]
14	16	(Spain) Carlos Alcaraz	2,414	(3)	1000	3,411	Champion, defeated (Norway) Casper Ruud [6]
15	17	(Spain) Roberto Bautista Agut	2,375	360	45	2,060	Third round lost to (United States) Jenson Brooksby
16	18	(United States) Reilly Opelka	2,246	31	10	2,225	Second round retired against (Argentina) Francisco Cerúndolo
17	19	(Spain) Pablo Carreño Busta	2,220	(10)	45	2,255	Third round lost to (Italy) Jannik Sinner [9]
18	20	(Georgia (country)) Nikoloz Basilashvili	1,916	45	10	1,881	Second round lost to (United States) Jenson Brooksby
19	21	(Italy) Lorenzo Sonego	1,902	90	10	1,822	Second round lost to (United States) Denis Kudla [Q]
20	22	(United States) John Isner	1,846	300	10	1,556	Second round lost to (France) Hugo Gaston
21	23	(Croatia) Marin Čilić	1,785	90	45	1,740	Third round lost to (Spain) Carlos Alcaraz [14]
22	24	(France) Gaël Monfils	1,723	(0)	45	1,768	Third round lost to (Argentina) Francisco Cerúndolo
23	25	Karen Khachanov	1,623	45	10	1,588	Second round lost to (United States) Tommy Paul
24	27	(United Kingdom) Daniel Evans	1,567	(20)	10	1,557	Second round lost to (Japan) Yoshihito Nishioka [Q]
25	28	(Australia) Alex de Minaur	1,531	(10)	45	1,566	Third round lost to (Greece) Stefanos Tsitsipas [3]
26	29	(Bulgaria) Grigor Dimitrov	1,471	23	10	1,458	Second round lost to (United States) Mackenzie McDonald
27	30	(Chile) Cristian Garín	1,466	(23)	10	1,453	Second round lost to (Spain) Pedro Martínez
28	31	(United States) Frances Tiafoe	1,453	90	90	1,453	Fourth round lost to (Argentina) Francisco Cerúndolo
29	32	Aslan Karatsev	1,428	45	45	1,428	Third round lost to (Poland) Hubert Hurkacz [8]
30	33	(Kazakhstan) Alexander Bublik	1,416	180+63^{‡}	45+20	1,238	Third round lost to (Norway) Casper Ruud [6]
31	34	(Italy) Fabio Fognini	1,339	23	45	1,361	Third round lost to (Australia) Nick Kyrgios [WC]
32	35	(Spain) Albert Ramos Viñolas	1,314	23	10	1,301	Second round lost to (United States) Sebastian Korda

† This column shows either (a) the higher of (1) the player's points from the 2021 tournament or (2) 50% of his points from the 2019 tournament, or (b) his 19th best result (shown in brackets). Only ranking points counting towards the player's ranking as of March 21, 2022, are reflected in the column.
‡ The player is also defending points from a 2019 ATP Challenger Tour tournament (Monterrey)

=== Withdrawn players ===
The following players would have been seeded, but withdrew before the tournament began.

Rank	Player	Points before	Points defending	Points after	Withdrawal reason
1	(Serbia) Novak Djokovic	8,465	45	8,420	Failure to meet vaccine requirements
3	(Spain) Rafael Nadal	7,115	0	7,115	Schedule change
26	(Switzerland) Roger Federer	1,620	500	1,120	Right knee surgery

== Other entry information ==
=== Wildcards ===
- (United Kingdom) Jack Draper
- (Australia) Nick Kyrgios
- (United Kingdom) Andy Murray
- (United States) Emilio Nava
- (China) Shang Juncheng

=== Protected ranking ===
- (Slovenia) Aljaž Bedene
- (Croatia) Borna Ćorić
- (France) Gilles Simon
- (France) Jo-Wilfried Tsonga

=== Qualifiers ===
- (Japan) Taro Daniel
- (Colombia) Daniel Elahi Galán
- (Ecuador) Emilio Gómez
- (Australia) Thanasi Kokkinakis
- (United States) Mitchell Krueger
- (United States) Denis Kudla
- (Kazakhstan) Mikhail Kukushkin
- (Spain) Jaume Munar
- (Japan) Yoshihito Nishioka
- (United States) Jack Sock
- (Spain) Fernando Verdasco
- (United States) J. J. Wolf

=== Lucky loser ===
- (South Africa) Kevin Anderson

=== Withdrawals ===
- (Spain) Pablo Andújar → replaced by (Spain) Roberto Carballés Baena
- (Italy) Matteo Berrettini → replaced by (South Africa) Kevin Anderson
- (Serbia) Novak Djokovic → replaced by (Switzerland) Henri Laaksonen
- (Australia) James Duckworth → replaced by (Argentina) Sebastián Báez
- (Switzerland) Roger Federer → replaced by (Argentina) Francisco Cerúndolo
- Ilya Ivashka → replaced by (Germany) Daniel Altmaier
- (Serbia) Filip Krajinović → replaced by (Australia) Jordan Thompson
- (Slovakia) Alex Molčan → replaced by (Germany) Oscar Otte
- (Spain) Rafael Nadal → replaced by (Australia) John Millman
- (Japan) Kei Nishikori → replaced by (Poland) Kamil Majchrzak
- (Austria) Dominic Thiem → replaced by (Argentina) Juan Manuel Cerúndolo

== Qualifying ==
=== Seeds ===
1. (Portugal) João Sousa (first round)
2. (Denmark) Holger Rune (first round, retired)
3. (South Africa) Kevin Anderson (qualifying competition, lucky loser)
4. (Japan) Yoshihito Nishioka (qualified)
5. (Germany) Peter Gojowczyk (qualifying competition)
6. (Australia) Thanasi Kokkinakis (qualified)
7. (Spain) Jaume Munar (qualified)
8. (United States) Denis Kudla (qualified)
9. (Colombia) Daniel Elahi Galán (qualified)
10. (Japan) Taro Daniel (qualified)
11. (United States) Sam Querrey (first round)
12. (United States) Steve Johnson (qualifying competition)
13. (Brazil) Thiago Monteiro (first round)
14. (Moldova) Radu Albot (first round)
15. (United States) Stefan Kozlov (first round)
16. (Italy) Andreas Seppi (qualifying competition)
17. (United Kingdom) Liam Broady (first round)
18. (Australia) Aleksandar Vukic (first round)
19. (Germany) Mats Moraing (first round, retired)
20. (Canada) Vasek Pospisil (first round)
21. (Sweden) Elias Ymer (qualifying competition)
22. (United States) Ernesto Escobedo (withdrew)
23. (Ecuador) Emilio Gómez (qualified)
24. (United States) Bjorn Fratangelo (qualifying competition)

=== Qualifiers ===
1. (Spain) Fernando Verdasco
2. (Kazakhstan) Mikhail Kukushkin
3. (United States) Mitchell Krueger
4. (Japan) Yoshihito Nishioka
5. (Ecuador) Emilio Gómez
6. (Australia) Thanasi Kokkinakis
7. (Spain) Jaume Munar
8. (United States) Denis Kudla
9. (Colombia) Daniel Elahi Galán
10. (Japan) Taro Daniel
11. (United States) J. J. Wolf
12. (United States) Jack Sock

=== Lucky loser ===
1. (South Africa) Kevin Anderson

=== Qualifying draw ===
==== First qualifier ====
First round
1	(Portugal) João Sousa	4	6	4
(Spain) Fernando Verdasco	6	4	6
(France) Hugo Grenier	6	7^{7}
20	(Canada) Vasek Pospisil	4	6^{5}

Qualifying competition
(Spain) Fernando Verdasco	6	7^{10}
(France) Hugo Grenier	3	6^{8}

==== Second qualifier ====
First round
2	(Denmark) Holger Rune	1	0^{r}
WC	(Japan) Shintaro Mochizuki	6	0
(Kazakhstan) Mikhail Kukushkin	4	7^{9}	6
14	(Moldova) Radu Albot	6	6^{7}	2

Qualifying competition
WC	(Japan) Shintaro Mochizuki	6^{6}	2
(Kazakhstan) Mikhail Kukushkin	7^{8}	6

==== Third qualifier ====
First round
3	(South Africa) Kevin Anderson	6	6
(Australia) Alex Bolt	3	4
(United States) Mitchell Krueger	6	6
15	(United States) Stefan Kozlov	2	2

Qualifying competition
3	(South Africa) Kevin Anderson	6^{5}	5
(United States) Mitchell Krueger	7^{7}	7

==== Fourth qualifier ====
First round
4	(Japan) Yoshihito Nishioka	6	6
Egor Gerasimov	4	2
(United States) Christopher Eubanks	6	6
17	(United Kingdom) Liam Broady	4	2

Qualifying competition
4	(Japan) Yoshihito Nishioka	2	7^{7}	6
(United States) Christopher Eubanks	6	6^{1}	1

==== Fifth qualifier ====
First round
5	(Germany) Peter Gojowczyk	6	6
PR	(Germany) Cedrik-Marcel Stebe	2	2
(Argentina) Thiago Agustín Tirante	6^{4}	6	3
23	(Ecuador) Emilio Gómez	7^{7}	4	6

Qualifying competition
5	(Germany) Peter Gojowczyk	6	6^{4}	2
23	(Ecuador) Emilio Gómez	3	7^{7}	6

==== Sixth qualifier ====
First round
6	(Australia) Thanasi Kokkinakis	6	6
(Italy) Thomas Fabbiano	1	3
(Czech Republic) Tomáš Macháč	6	3	2
16	(Italy) Andreas Seppi	2	6	6

Qualifying competition
6	(Australia) Thanasi Kokkinakis	6	6
16	(Italy) Andreas Seppi	3	4

==== Seventh qualifier ====
First round
7	(Spain) Jaume Munar	6	6
Alt	(Brazil) Thiago Seyboth Wild	3	2
(United States) Tennys Sandgren	7^{9}	2	2
21	(Sweden) Elias Ymer	6^{7}	6	6

Qualifying competition
7	(Spain) Jaume Munar	7	6
21	(Sweden) Elias Ymer	5	3

==== Eighth qualifier ====
First round
8	(United States) Denis Kudla	6^{5}	6	6
WC	(Brazil) Gustavo Heide	7^{7}	4	3
WC	(United States) Ulises Blanch	6	3
19	(Germany) Mats Moraing	4	1^{r}

Qualifying competition
8	(United States) Denis Kudla	7^{10}	2	6
WC	(United States) Ulises Blanch	6^{8}	6	3

==== Ninth qualifier ====
First round
9	(Colombia) Daniel Elahi Galán	6	6
WC	(United States) Martin Damm	3	4
(Argentina) Nicolás Kicker	6	6
Alt	(Australia) Matthew Ebden	2	1

Qualifying competition
9	(Colombia) Daniel Elahi Galán	5	6	6
(Argentina) Nicolás Kicker	7	3	4

==== Tenth qualifier ====
First round
10	(Japan) Taro Daniel	6	6
(Australia) Max Purcell	2	2
(United Kingdom) Jay Clarke	2	1
24	(United States) Bjorn Fratangelo	6	6

Qualifying competition
10	(Japan) Taro Daniel	6	7^{7}
24	(United States) Bjorn Fratangelo	1	6^{4}

==== Eleventh qualifier ====
First round
11	(United States) Sam Querrey	4	3
PR	(United States) J. J. Wolf	6	6
(Kazakhstan) Dmitry Popko	6	4	6
13	(Brazil) Thiago Monteiro	4	6	4

Qualifying competition
PR	(United States) J. J. Wolf	6	6
(Kazakhstan) Dmitry Popko	4	4

==== Twelfth qualifier ====
First round
12	(United States) Steve Johnson	6	6
WC	(United States) Michael Mmoh	3	3
(United States) Jack Sock	6	2	6
18	(Australia) Aleksandar Vukic	4	6	4

Qualifying competition
12	(United States) Steve Johnson	2	2
(United States) Jack Sock	6	6
