= 2012 Tevlin Women's Challenger =

- Date: October 29 – November 4
- Edition: 8th
- Category: ITF Women's Circuit
- Prize money: US$50,000
- Surface: Hard – indoors
- Location: Toronto, Ontario, Canada
- Venue: Rexall Centre

Champions

Singles
- (Canada) Eugenie Bouchard

Doubles
- (Canada) Gabriela Dabrowski / (Russia) Alla Kudryavtseva
← 2011 ·	Tevlin Women's Challenger	· 2013 →

The 2012 Tevlin Women's Challenger was a professional tennis tournament played on indoor hard courts. It was the 8th edition of the tournament and part of the 2012 ITF Women's Circuit, offering a total of $50,000 in prize money. It took place in Toronto, Ontario, Canada between October 29 and November 4, 2012.

== Singles main-draw entrants ==
=== Seeds ===
Country	Player	Rank^{1}	Seed
USA	Maria Sanchez	151	1
CAN	Stéphanie Dubois	153	2
USA	Jessica Pegula	156	3
CAN	Eugenie Bouchard	169	4
CAN	Sharon Fichman	193	5
GER	Kathrin Wörle	213	6
RUS	Alla Kudryavtseva	245	7
USA	Julia Boserup	255	8

- ^{1} Rankings are as of October 22, 2012

=== Other entrants ===
The following players received wildcards into the singles main draw:

- (Canada) Françoise Abanda
- (Canada) Gloria Liang
- (Canada) Rebecca Marino
- (Canada) Erin Routliffe

The following players received entry from the qualifying draw:

- (France) Sherazad Benamar
- (Canada) Elisabeth Fournier
- (Canada) Sonja Molnar
- (Canada) Carol Zhao

== Champions ==
=== Singles ===
- (Canada) Eugenie Bouchard def. (Canada) Sharon Fichman, 6–1, 6–2

=== Doubles ===
- (Canada) Gabriela Dabrowski / (Russia) Alla Kudryavtseva def. (Canada) Eugenie Bouchard / (United States) Jessica Pegula, 6–2, 7–6^{(7–2)}
