= 2011 Tevlin Women's Challenger =

- Date: October 31 – November 6
- Edition: 7th
- Category: ITF Women's Circuit
- Prize money: US$50,000
- Surface: Hard – indoors
- Location: Toronto, Ontario, Canada
- Venue: Rexall Centre

Champions

Singles
- (Switzerland) Amra Sadiković

Doubles
- (Canada) Gabriela Dabrowski / (Canada) Marie-Ève Pelletier
← 2010 ·	Tevlin Women's Challenger	· 2012 →

The 2011 Tevlin Women's Challenger was a professional tennis tournament played on indoor hard courts. It was the 7th edition of the tournament and part of the 2011 ITF Women's Circuit, offering a total of $50,000 in prize money. It took place in Toronto, Ontario, Canada between October 31 and November 6, 2011.

== Singles main-draw entrants ==
=== Seeds ===
Country	Player	Rank^{1}	Seed
CRO	Mirjana Lučić	117	1
LUX	Mandy Minella	120	2
USA	Alexa Glatch	145	3
USA	Julia Cohen	159	4
CAN	Sharon Fichman	160	5
HUN	Tímea Babos	181	6
POR	Michelle Larcher de Brito	187	7
SLO	Petra Rampre	201	8

- ^{1} Rankings are as of October 24, 2011

=== Other entrants ===
The following players received wildcards into the singles main draw:

- (Canada) Elisabeth Abanda
- (Canada) Gabriela Dabrowski
- (Canada) Erin Routliffe
- (Canada) Kimberley-Ann Surin

The following players received entry from the qualifying draw:

- (Croatia) Maria Abramović
- (United States) Diana Ospina
- (Switzerland) Amra Sadiković
- (Canada) Carol Zhao

The following players received entry as lucky losers:

- (France) Céline Cattaneo
- (Russia) Nika Kukharchuk
- (United States) Eleanor Peters

== Champions ==
=== Singles ===
(Switzerland) Amra Sadiković def. (Canada) Gabriela Dabrowski, 6–4, 6–2

=== Doubles ===
(Canada) Gabriela Dabrowski / (Canada) Marie-Ève Pelletier def. (Hungary) Tímea Babos / (United States) Jessica Pegula, 7–5, 6–7^{(5–7)}, [10–4]
