= 2011 Tevlin Women's Challenger – Doubles =

Doubles
- 2011 Tevlin Women's Challenger

Final
- Champions: (Canada) Gabriela Dabrowski (Canada) Marie-Ève Pelletier
- Runners-up: (Hungary) Tímea Babos (United States) Jessica Pegula
- Score: 7–5, 6–7^{(5–7)}, [10–4]

Events
Singles	Doubles
← 2010 ·	Tevlin Women's Challenger	· 2012 →

Gabriela Dabrowski and Sharon Fichman were the defending champions, but both competed with different partners. Dabrowski competed with Marie-Ève Pelletier, while Fichman competed with Sun Shengnan and both faced each other in the semifinals with Dabrowski and Pelletier winning.

Dabrowski then successfully defended her title partnering up with Pelletier and defeating Tímea Babos and Jessica Pegula in the final 7–5, 6–7^{(5–7)}, [10–4].

== Seeds ==
1. (Canada) Sharon Fichman / (China) Sun Shengnan (semifinals)
2. (Slovenia) Andreja Klepač / (Luxembourg) Mandy Minella (first round)
3. (United States) Alexa Glatch / (United States) Alexandra Mueller (quarterfinals)
4. (Croatia) Maria Abramović / (Brazil) Maria Fernanda Alves (quarterfinals)

== Draw ==
=== Key ===
- Q = Qualifier
- WC = Wild card
- LL = Lucky loser
- Alt = Alternate
- SE = Special exempt
- PR = Protected ranking
- ITF = ITF entry
- JE = Junior exempt
- w/o = Walkover
- r = Retired
- d = Defaulted
- SR = Special ranking

=== Draw ===
First round
1	(Canada) S Fichman (China) S Sun	6	6
(United States) J Cohen (United States) C-y Hsu	1	1
(France) C Cattaneo (Switzerland) A Sadiković	4	6	[6]
(Austria) N Rottmann (Germany) S Werner	6	4	[10]
3	(United States) A Glatch (United States) A Mueller	6	6
WC	(Canada) D Chypyha (Canada) L Chypyha	1	3
(Canada) G Dabrowski (Canada) M-È Pelletier	6	6
(Belarus) V Kisialeva (Brazil) N Rossi	4	1
(Canada) E Abanda (Canada) K-A Surin	6^{0}	0
(Hungary) T Babos (United States) J Pegula	7^{7}	6
(Russia) N Kukharchuk (United States) E Peters	1	1
4	(Croatia) M Abramović (Brazil) MF Alves	6	6
(United States) S Kalhorn (United States) M Kobelt	3	4
(Canada) E Routliffe (Canada) C Zhao	6	6
(Canada) E Bouchard (United States) A Fink	6	0	[10]
2	(Slovenia) A Klepač (Luxembourg) M Minella	3	6	[5]

Quarterfinals
1	(Canada) S Fichman (China) S Sun	w/o
(Austria) N Rottmann (Germany) S Werner
3	(United States) A Glatch (United States) A Mueller
(Canada) G Dabrowski (Canada) M-È Pelletier	w/o
(Hungary) T Babos (United States) J Pegula	6	6
4	(Croatia) M Abramović (Brazil) MF Alves	3	3
(Canada) E Routliffe (Canada) C Zhao	2	2
(Canada) E Bouchard (United States) A Fink	6	6

Semifinals
1	(Canada) S Fichman (China) S Sun	3	6^{6}
(Canada) G Dabrowski (Canada) M-È Pelletier	6	7^{8}
(Hungary) T Babos (United States) J Pegula	7	6
(Canada) E Bouchard (United States) A Fink	5	1

Finals
(Canada) G Dabrowski (Canada) M-È Pelletier	7	6^{5}	[10]
(Hungary) T Babos (United States) J Pegula	5	7^{7}	[4]
