= 2022 Miami Open =

- Date: March 22 – April 3
- Edition: 37th
- Category: ATP Masters 1000 (ATP); WTA 1000 (WTA)
- Draw: 96S / 48Q / 32D
- Prize money: $9,554,920 (ATP) $8,369,455 (WTA)
- Surface: Hard - outdoor
- Location: Miami Gardens, Florida, United States
- Venue: Hard Rock Stadium

Champions

Men's singles
- (Spain) Carlos Alcaraz

Women's singles
- (Poland) Iga Świątek

Men's doubles
- (Poland) Hubert Hurkacz / (United States) John Isner

Women's doubles
- (Germany) Laura Siegemund / Vera Zvonareva
- Miami Open

The 2022 Miami Open was a professional hardcourt tennis tournament played from March 22 to April 3, 2022 on the grounds of Hard Rock Stadium in Miami Gardens, Florida in the United States. It was the 37th edition of the men's and women's event and was classified as an ATP Masters 1000 event on the 2022 ATP Tour and a WTA 1000 event on the 2022 WTA Tour.

Hubert Hurkacz and Ashleigh Barty were the defending champions in the men's and women's singles draw, respectively. However, Barty withdrew before the tournament began and later announced her retirement from professional tennis. Hurkacz lost in the semifinals to Carlos Alcaraz.

== Finals ==
=== Men's singles ===
- (Spain) Carlos Alcaraz defeated (Norway) Casper Ruud, 7–5, 6–4

This was Alcaraz's first ATP Tour Masters 1000 singles title.

=== Women's singles ===
- (Poland) Iga Świątek defeated (Japan) Naomi Osaka, 6–4, 6–0

This was Świątek's sixth WTA Tour singles title, and third WTA 1000 title of the year. She became the fourth woman in history to win the Sunshine Double in singles, following her victory at Indian Wells a fortnight prior, and the youngest to do so. Świątek became the first woman in history to win the first three WTA 1000 titles of the year in succession, and the first player since Serena Williams in 2013 to win three consecutive WTA 1000 titles.

=== Men's doubles ===
- (Poland) Hubert Hurkacz / (United States) John Isner defeated (Netherlands) Wesley Koolhof / (United Kingdom) Neal Skupski, 7–6^{(7–5)}, 6–4

Isner won the Sunshine Double in doubles, following his victory in Indian Wells two weeks previously.

=== Women's doubles ===
- (Germany) Laura Siegemund / Vera Zvonareva defeated Veronika Kudermetova / (Belgium) Elise Mertens, 7–6^{(7–3)}, 7–5.

== Points and prize money ==
=== Point distribution ===
Event	W	F	SF	QF	R16	R32	R64	R128	Q	Q2	Q1
Men's singles	1000	600	360	180	90	45	25*	10	16	8	0
Men's doubles	1000	600	360	180	90	0	—N/a	—N/a	—N/a	—N/a	—N/a
Women's singles	1000	650	390	215	120	65	35*	10	30	20	2
Women's doubles	1000	650	390	215	120	10	—N/a	—N/a	—N/a	—N/a	—N/a

* Players with byes receive first round points.

=== Prize money ===
The prize money for the 2022 Miami Open is $9,554,920. All prize money is in US Dollars.

Event	W	F	SF	QF	R16	R32	R64	R128	Q2	Q1
Men's singles	$1,231,245	$646,110	$343,985	$179,940	$94,575	$54,400	$30,130	$18,200	$9,205	$5,025
Women's singles	$1,231,245	$646,110	$343,985	$179,940	$94,575	$54,400	$30,130	$18,200	$9,205	$5,025
Men's doubles*	$426,010	$225,980	$120,520	$61,100	$32,630	$17,580	—N/a	—N/a	—N/a	—N/a
Women's doubles*	$426,010	$225,980	$120,520	$61,100	$32,630	$17,580	—N/a	—N/a	—N/a	—N/a

*per team

== See also ==
- 2022 ATP Tour
- ATP Tour Masters 1000
- List of ATP Tour top-level tournament singles champions
- Tennis Masters Series records and statistics
- 2022 WTA Tour
- WTA 1000 tournaments
- WTA Premier Mandatory/5
- List of WTA Tour top-level tournament singles champions
