= 2022 Miami Open – Women's singles =

Women's singles
- 2022 Miami Open

Final
- Champion: (Poland) Iga Świątek
- Runner-up: (Japan) Naomi Osaka
- Score: 6–4, 6–0

Details
- Draw: 96 (12 Q / 8 WC )
- Seeds: 32

Events
Singles	men	women
Doubles	men	women
← 2021 ·	Miami Open	· 2023 →

Iga Świątek defeated Naomi Osaka in the final, 6–4, 6–0 to win the women's singles tennis title at the 2022 Miami Open. She was the fourth woman (after Steffi Graf, Kim Clijsters, and Victoria Azarenka) to complete the Sunshine Double in singles, having won Indian Wells two weeks earlier. It was Świątek's first Miami Open title, her third consecutive WTA 1000 title, and her fourth WTA 1000-level title overall. Świątek became the first woman in history to win the first three WTA 1000 titles of the year in succession, the first player since Serena Williams in 2013 to win three consecutive WTA 1000 titles, and extended her winning streak to 17 matches. She lost no sets and just 26 games en route to the title, the fewest since Martina Hingis dropped 21 games in 2000.

Ranked as the world No. 77, Osaka was the lowest-ranked finalist in tournament history, surpassing Clijsters' 2005 achievement as the then-world No. 38.

Ashleigh Barty was the two-time reigning champion, but withdrew from the tournament citing health issues. She later announced her retirement from professional tennis.

Świątek and Paula Badosa were in contention for the WTA No. 1 singles ranking at the start of the tournament after Barty requested to be removed from the WTA rankings following her retirement. Świątek became the new world No. 1 after winning her second round match, making her the 28th player and the first Pole to hold the top singles position since the computer rankings began in 1975. Świątek also became the first player born in the 21st century (male or female) to hold a world No. 1 singles ranking.

Like at Indian Wells, the international governing bodies of tennis (WTA, ATP, ITF, Australian Open, French Open, Wimbledon, US Open) allowed players from Russia and Belarus to continue to participate in tennis events on tour and at the majors, but not under the name or flag of Russia or Belarus until further notice, due to the 2022 Russian invasion of Ukraine.

== Seeds ==
All seeds received a bye into the second round.

1. Aryna Sabalenka (second round)
2. (Poland) Iga Świątek (champion)
3. (Estonia) Anett Kontaveit (second round)
4. (Greece) Maria Sakkari (second round)
5. (Spain) Paula Badosa (quarterfinals, retired)
6. (Czech Republic) Karolína Plíšková (second round)
7. (Spain) Garbiñe Muguruza (withdrew)
8. (Tunisia) Ons Jabeur (fourth round)
9. (United States) Danielle Collins (quarterfinals)
10. (Latvia) Jeļena Ostapenko (second round)
11. (United Kingdom) Emma Raducanu (second round)
12. Victoria Azarenka (third round, retired)
13. (Germany) Angelique Kerber (second round)
14. (United States) Coco Gauff (fourth round)
15. (Ukraine) Elina Svitolina (second round)
16. (United States) Jessica Pegula (semifinals)

17. (Kazakhstan) Elena Rybakina (third round)
18. (Canada) Leylah Fernandez (second round)
19. (Slovenia) Tamara Zidanšek (second round)
20. (Belgium) Elise Mertens (second round)
21. Veronika Kudermetova (fourth round)
22. (Switzerland) Belinda Bencic (semifinals)
23. (Romania) Simona Halep (withdrew)
24. (Romania) Sorana Cîrstea (second round)
25. Daria Kasatkina (second round)
26. (United States) Madison Keys (second round)
27. (Italy) Camila Giorgi (withdrew)
28. (Czech Republic) Petra Kvitová (quarterfinals)
29. Liudmila Samsonova (second round)
30. (Czech Republic) Markéta Vondroušová (withdrew)
31. (France) Alizé Cornet (second round)
32. (Spain) Sara Sorribes Tormo (second round)

Click on the seed number of a player to go to their draw section.

== Draw ==
=== Key ===
- Q = Qualifier
- WC = Wild card
- LL = Lucky loser
- Alt = Alternate
- ITF = ITF entry
- PR = Protected ranking
- SR = Special ranking
- SE = Special exempt
- JE = Junior exempt
- JR = Junior Accelerator Programme entrant
- CO = College Accelerator Programme entrant
- NG = Next Gen Accelerator Program entrant
- w/o = Walkover
- r = Retired
- d = Defaulted

=== Finals ===
Quarterfinals
22	(Switzerland) Belinda Bencic	6	6
WC	(Australia) Daria Saville	1	2
(Japan) Naomi Osaka	6	6
9	(United States) Danielle Collins	2	1
5	(Spain) Paula Badosa	1^{r}
16	(United States) Jessica Pegula	4
28	(Czech Republic) Petra Kvitová	3	3
2	(Poland) Iga Świątek	6	6

Semifinals
22	(Switzerland) Belinda Bencic	6	3	4
(Japan) Naomi Osaka	4	6	6
16	(United States) Jessica Pegula	2	5
2	(Poland) Iga Świątek	6	7

Final
(Japan) Naomi Osaka	4	0
2	(Poland) Iga Świątek	6	6

=== Top half ===
==== Section 1 ====
First round
WC	(United States) H Baptiste	7^{8}	1	1
(Romania) I-C Begu	6^{6}	6	6
Q	(China) Xin Wang	6^{6}	4
A Sasnovich	7^{8}	6
(Belgium) A Van Uytvanck	6	2	1
(Ukraine) M Kostyuk	4	6	6
(United Kingdom) H Watson	6^{5}	7	6
(Netherlands) A Rus	7^{7}	5	4

Second round
1	A Sabalenka	4	4
(Romania) I-C Begu	6	6
A Sasnovich	7^{7}	6
25	D Kasatkina	6^{5}	4
22	(Switzerland) B Bencic	6	6
(Ukraine) M Kostyuk	3	1
(United Kingdom) H Watson	4	6	7^{7}
15	(Ukraine) E Svitolina	6	3	6^{4}

Third round
(Romania) I-C Begu	5	7^{7}	4
A Sasnovich	7	6^{4}	6
22	(Switzerland) B Bencic	6	6
(United Kingdom) H Watson	4	1

Fourth round
A Sasnovich	2	3
22	(Switzerland) B Bencic	6	6

==== Section 2 ====
First round
Q	(Canada) R Marino	6	2	1
(Czech Republic) K Siniaková	3	6	6
(Belgium) G Minnen	5	3
WC	(Australia) D Saville	7	6
LL	(Italy) L Bronzetti	4	7^{8}	6
(Australia) A Tomljanović	6	6^{6}	2
WC	(United States) R Montgomery	6	4	6^{4}
Q	A Kalinskaya	4	6	7^{7}

Second round
11	(United Kingdom) E Raducanu	6	4	5
(Czech Republic) K Siniaková	3	6	7
WC	(Australia) D Saville	6	6
LL	(France) H Tan	4	2
LL	(Switzerland) S Vögele	2	1
LL	(Italy) L Bronzetti	6	6
Q	A Kalinskaya	6	6
6	(Czech Republic) Ka Plíšková	3	3

Third round
(Czech Republic) K Siniaková	0	0^{r}
WC	(Australia) D Saville	6	1
LL	(Italy) L Bronzetti	w/o
Q	A Kalinskaya

Fourth round
WC	(Australia) D Saville	5	6	7
LL	(Italy) L Bronzetti	7	4	5

==== Section 3 ====
First round
(United States) A Li	2	6	6
(Egypt) M Sherif	6	3	4
(Switzerland) J Teichmann	6^{5}	3
(United States) A Riske	7^{7}	6
(Czech Republic) K Muchová	7^{7}	7^{7}
(Czech Republic) T Martincová	6^{3}	6^{3}
(Japan) N Osaka	6	6
(Australia) A Sharma	3	4

Second round
3	(Estonia) A Kontaveit	0	6	4
(United States) A Li	6	3	6
(United States) A Riske	6	6
31	(France) A Cornet	2	2
18	(Canada) L Fernandez	4	6^{3}
(Czech Republic) K Muchová	6	7^{7}
(Japan) N Osaka	6	6
13	(Germany) A Kerber	2	3

Third round
(United States) A Li	2	6	3
(United States) A Riske	6	3	6
(Czech Republic) K Muchová
(Japan) N Osaka	w/o

Fourth round
(United States) A Riske	3	4
(Japan) N Osaka	6	6

==== Section 4 ====
First round
(France) C Garcia	5	0^{r}
(Hungary) A Bondár	7	0
(Japan) M Doi	4	1
Q	V Zvonareva	6	6
(Estonia) K Kanepi	6	0
(Belgium) M Zanevska	2	0^{r}
(Poland) M Linette	7^{7}	6
(China) Q Zheng	6^{4}	4

Second round
9	(United States) D Collins	6	3	6
(Hungary) A Bondár	3	6	4
Q	V Zvonareva	6	6
19	(Slovenia) T Zidanšek	3	2
32	(Spain) S Sorribes Tormo	6	5	0
(Estonia) K Kanepi	3	7	6
(Poland) M Linette	6^{1}	2
8	(Tunisia) O Jabeur	7^{7}	6

Third round
9	(United States) D Collins	6	6
Q	V Zvonareva	1	4
(Estonia) K Kanepi	3	0
8	(Tunisia) O Jabeur	6	6

Fourth round
9	(United States) D Collins	6	6
8	(Tunisia) O Jabeur	2	4

=== Bottom half ===
==== Section 5 ====
First round
PR	(Germany) L Siegemund	1	2
Q	(Czech Republic) M Bouzková	6	6
(Kazakhstan) Y Putintseva	4	6	6
WC	(Germany) N Schunk	6	3	1
WC	(Czech Republic) L Fruhvirtová	6	6
(Montenegro) D Kovinić	0	4
E Alexandrova	6	6
(Italy) J Paolini	1	2

Second round
5	(Spain) P Badosa	7	7
Q	(Czech Republic) M Bouzková	5	5
(Kazakhstan) Y Putintseva	6	4	7
LL	(Ukraine) L Tsurenko	3	6	5
20	(Belgium) E Mertens	5	6	1
WC	(Czech Republic) L Fruhvirtová	7	2	6
E Alexandrova	4	6	6^{5}
12	V Azarenka	6	2	7^{7}

Third round
5	(Spain) P Badosa	6	6
(Kazakhstan) Y Putintseva	3	2
WC	(Czech Republic) L Fruhvirtová	6	3
12	V Azarenka	2	0^{r}

Fourth round
5	(Spain) P Badosa	6	6
WC	(Czech Republic) L Fruhvirtová	2	3

==== Section 6 ====
First round
(Hungary) P Udvardy	4	3
(United States) S Stephens	6	6
(Romania) E-G Ruse	6	6
(Croatia) A Konjuh	3	4
Q	(Georgia (country)) E Gorgodze	2	6	3
(Ukraine) A Kalinina	6	3	6
(Brazil) B Haddad Maia	7^{7}	6
(Spain) N Párrizas Díaz	6^{2}	2

Second round
16	(United States) J Pegula	6	6
(United States) S Stephens	1	4
(Romania) E-G Ruse	4	5
17	(Kazakhstan) E Rybakina	6	7
26	(United States) M Keys	6	3	4
(Ukraine) A Kalinina	3	6	6
(Brazil) B Haddad Maia	4	6	6
4	(Greece) M Sakkari	6	1	2

Third round
16	(United States) J Pegula	6	6
17	(Kazakhstan) E Rybakina	3	4
(Ukraine) A Kalinina	2	6	6
(Brazil) B Haddad Maia	6	4	2

Fourth round
16	(United States) J Pegula	6	0
(Ukraine) A Kalinina	0	0^{r}

==== Section 7 ====
First round
Q	(China) Y Yuan	4	1
Q	(United States) L Davis	6	6
(France) C Burel	6	7
Q	(Poland) M Fręch	3	5
Q	(Hungary) D Gálfi	6	6
(Slovakia) K Kučová	0	0
(United States) A Anisimova	6	0	3
(United States) S Rogers	3	6	6

Second round
LL	(Australia) S Sanders	4	1
Q	(United States) L Davis	6	6
(France) C Burel	1	6	3
28	(Czech Republic) P Kvitová	6	3	6
21	V Kudermetova	5
Q	(Hungary) D Gálfi	1^{r}
(United States) S Rogers	6	7^{7}
10	(Latvia) J Ostapenko	3	6^{0}

Third round
Q	(United States) L Davis	5	1
28	(Czech Republic) P Kvitová	7	6
21	V Kudermetova	6	7
(United States) S Rogers	1	5

Fourth round
28	(Czech Republic) P Kvitová	7^{7}	6
21	V Kudermetova	6^{5}	4

==== Section 8 ====
First round
WC	(United States) A Krueger	6	5	2
Q	(China) Q Wang	4	7	6
(China) S Zhang	6	4	2
(Denmark) C Tauson	4	6	1^{r}
WC	(Philippines) A Eala	2	1
(United States) M Brengle	6	6
Q	(Belgium) K Flipkens	4	6	4
(Switzerland) V Golubic	6	4	6

Second round
14	(United States) C Gauff	7	6
Q	(China) Q Wang	5	4
(China) S Zhang	6	6
24	(Romania) S Cîrstea	1	1
29	L Samsonova	4	0
(United States) M Brengle	6	6
(Switzerland) V Golubic	2	0
2	(Poland) I Świątek	6	6

Third round
14	(United States) C Gauff	7^{7}	7
(China) S Zhang	6^{1}	5
(United States) M Brengle	0	3
2	(Poland) I Świątek	6	6

Fourth round
14	(United States) C Gauff	3	1
2	(Poland) I Świątek	6	6

== Seeded players ==
The following are the seeded players. Seedings are based on WTA rankings as of March 7, 2022. Rankings and points before are as of March 21, 2022.

Because points from the 2021 tournament were not mandatory, they are included in the table below only if they counted towards the player's ranking as of March 21, 2022. Players who are not defending points from the 2021 tournament will instead have their 16th best result replaced by their points from the 2022 tournament.

Seed	Rank	Player	Points before	Points defending (or 16th best result)	Points won	Points after	Status
1	5	Aryna Sabalenka	4,862	215	10	4,657	Second round lost to (Romania) Irina-Camelia Begu
2	2	(Poland) Iga Świątek	5,776	65	1000	6,711	Champion, defeated (Japan) Naomi Osaka
3	7	(Estonia) Anett Kontaveit	4,686	(185)	10	4,511	Second round lost to (United States) Ann Li
4	3	(Greece) Maria Sakkari	5,085	390	10	4,705	Second round lost to (Brazil) Beatriz Haddad Maia
5	6	(Spain) Paula Badosa	4,790	35	215	4,970	Quarterfinals retired against (United States) Jessica Pegula [16]
6	8	(Czech Republic) Karolína Plíšková	4,252	65	10	4,197	Second round lost to Anna Kalinskaya [Q]
7	9	(Spain) Garbiñe Muguruza	3,190	120	0	3,070	Withdrew due to left shoulder injury
8	10	(Tunisia) Ons Jabeur	2,975	120	120	2,975	Fourth round lost to (United States) Danielle Collins [9]
9	11	(United States) Danielle Collins	2,971	35	215	3,151	Quarterfinals lost to (Japan) Naomi Osaka
10	12	(Latvia) Jeļena Ostapenko	2,860	65	10	2,805	Second round lost to (United States) Shelby Rogers
11	13	(United Kingdom) Emma Raducanu	2,699	3^{†}	10	2,706	Second round lost to (Czech Republic) Kateřina Siniaková
12	16	Victoria Azarenka	2,336	120	65	2,281	Third round retired against (Czech Republic) Linda Fruhvirtová [WC]
13	15	(Germany) Angelique Kerber	2,352	65	10	2,297	Second round lost to (Japan) Naomi Osaka
14	17	(United States) Cori Gauff	2,280	(55)	120	2,345	Fourth round lost to (Poland) Iga Świątek [2]
15	20	(Ukraine) Elina Svitolina	2,216	390	10	1,836	Second round lost to (United Kingdom) Heather Watson
16	21	(United States) Jessica Pegula	2,215	120	390	2,485	Semifinals lost to (Poland) Iga Świątek [2]
17	18	(Kazakhstan) Elena Rybakina	2,261	65	65	2,261	Third round lost to (United States) Jessica Pegula [16]
18	22	(Canada) Leylah Fernandez	2,171	(25)	10	2,156	Second round lost to (Czech Republic) Karolína Muchová
19	25	(Slovenia) Tamara Zidanšek	1,931	20	10	1,921	Second round lost to Vera Zvonareva [Q]
20	24	(Belgium) Elise Mertens	1,950	120	10	1,840	Second round lost to (Czech Republic) Linda Fruhvirtová [WC]
21	23	Veronika Kudermetova	2,035	65	120	2,090	Fourth round lost to (Czech Republic) Petra Kvitová [28]
22	28	(Switzerland) Belinda Bencic	1,826	65	390	2,151	Semifinals lost to (Japan) Naomi Osaka
23	19	(Romania) Simona Halep	2,221	65	0	2,156	Withdrew due to left thigh injury
24	27	(Romania) Sorana Cîrstea	1,865	35	10	1,840	Second round lost to (China) Zhang Shuai
25	29	Daria Kasatkina	1,790	(30)	10	1,770	Second round lost to Aliaksandra Sasnovich
26	26	(United States) Madison Keys	1,904	10	10	1,904	Second round lost to (Ukraine) Anhelina Kalinina
27	31	(Italy) Camila Giorgi	1,613	10	0	1,603	Withdrew due to right wrist injury
28	32	(Czech Republic) Petra Kvitová	1,595	120	215	1,690	Quarterfinals lost to (Poland) Iga Świątek [2]
29	30	Liudmila Samsonova	1,632	95	10	1,547	Second round lost to (United States) Madison Brengle
30	33	(Czech Republic) Markéta Vondroušová	1,577	120	0	1,457	Withdrew due to viral illness
31	36	(France) Alizé Cornet	1,340	35	10	1,315	Second round lost to (United States) Alison Riske
32	35	(Spain) Sara Sorribes Tormo	1,340	215	10	1,135	Second round lost to (Estonia) Kaia Kanepi

† The player is defending points from a 2019 ITF Women's World Tennis Tour tournament.

=== Withdrawn players ===
The following players would have been seeded, but withdrew before the tournament began.

Rank	Player	Points before	Points defending (or 16th best result)	Points after	Withdrawal reason
1	(Australia) Ashleigh Barty	7,980	7,980	0^{†}	Fatigue
4	(Czech Republic) Barbora Krejčíková	5,033	58^{‡}	4,975	Elbow injury
14	Anastasia Pavlyuchenkova	2,473	0	2,473	Knee injury
34	(Colombia) Camila Osorio	1,349	(15)	1,334	Injury

† The player retired from professional tennis and requested to be removed from the WTA rankings at the end of the tournament.
‡ The player is defending points from a 2019 ITF Women's World Tennis Tour tournament.

== Other entry information ==
=== Wildcards ===
- (United States) Hailey Baptiste
- (Philippines) Alex Eala
- (Czech Republic) Linda Fruhvirtová
- ~~(United States) Sofia Kenin~~
- (United States) Ashlyn Krueger
- (United States) Robin Montgomery
- (Australia) Daria Saville
- (Germany) Nastasja Schunk

=== Protected ranking ===
- (Germany) Laura Siegemund

=== Qualifiers ===
- (Czech Republic) Marie Bouzková
- (United States) Lauren Davis
- (Belgium) Kirsten Flipkens
- (Poland) Magdalena Fręch
- (Hungary) Dalma Gálfi
- (Georgia (country)) Ekaterine Gorgodze
- Anna Kalinskaya
- (Canada) Rebecca Marino
- (China) Wang Qiang
- (China) Wang Xinyu
- (China) Yuan Yue
- Vera Zvonareva

=== Lucky losers ===
- (Italy) Lucia Bronzetti
- (Australia) Storm Sanders
- (France) Harmony Tan
- (Ukraine) Lesia Tsurenko
- (Switzerland) Stefanie Vögele

=== Withdrawals ===
- (Australia) Ashleigh Barty → replaced by (Japan) Misaki Doi
- (Romania) Jaqueline Cristian → replaced by (France) Caroline Garcia
- (Italy) Camila Giorgi → replaced by (Switzerland) Stefanie Vögele
- Varvara Gracheva → replaced by (Belgium) Greet Minnen
- (Romania) Simona Halep → replaced by (France) Harmony Tan
- (United States) Sofia Kenin → replaced by (Italy) Lucia Bronzetti
- (Czech Republic) Barbora Krejčíková → replaced by (Hungary) Panna Udvardy
- (Spain) Garbiñe Muguruza → replaced by (Australia) Storm Sanders
- (Colombia) Camila Osorio → replaced by (Japan) Naomi Osaka
- Anastasia Pavlyuchenkova → replaced by (China) Zheng Qinwen
- (Sweden) Rebecca Peterson → replaced by (United Kingdom) Heather Watson
- (Germany) Andrea Petkovic → replaced by (Australia) Astra Sharma
- (Czech Republic) Markéta Vondroušová → replaced by (Ukraine) Lesia Tsurenko

== Qualifying ==
=== Seeds ===
1. (Croatia) Petra Martić (first round)
2. (China) Wang Xinyu (qualified)
3. (Slovenia) Kaja Juvan (first round, retired)
4. (Italy) Martina Trevisan (first round)
5. (United States) Claire Liu (first round)
6. (Poland) Magdalena Fręch (qualified)
7. Anna Kalinskaya (qualified)
8. (France) Harmony Tan (qualifying competition, lucky loser)
9. (United States) Lauren Davis (qualified)
10. (Czech Republic) Marie Bouzková (qualified)
11. (France) Diane Parry (first round)
12. (Italy) Lucia Bronzetti (qualifying competition, lucky loser)
13. (Ukraine) Dayana Yastremska (first round, retired)
14. (China) Wang Qiang (qualified)
15. (Hungary) Dalma Gálfi (qualified)
16. (France) Chloé Paquet (first round)
17. (Germany) Jule Niemeier (first round)
18. Kamilla Rakhimova (first round)
19. Vera Zvonareva (qualified)
20. (Serbia) Aleksandra Krunić (first round)
21. (Georgia (country)) Ekaterine Gorgodze (qualified)
22. Anastasia Potapova (qualifying competition)
23. (United Kingdom) Harriet Dart (first round)
24. (Canada) Rebecca Marino (qualified)

=== Qualifiers ===
1. (Hungary) Dalma Gálfi
2. (China) Wang Xinyu
3. (Canada) Rebecca Marino
4. (China) Yuan Yue
5. Vera Zvonareva
6. (Poland) Magdalena Fręch
7. Anna Kalinskaya
8. (Georgia (country)) Ekaterine Gorgodze
9. (United States) Lauren Davis
10. (Czech Republic) Marie Bouzková
11. (Belgium) Kirsten Flipkens
12. (China) Wang Qiang

=== Lucky losers ===
1. (Italy) Lucia Bronzetti
2. (Switzerland) Stefanie Vögele
3. (France) Harmony Tan
4. (Australia) Storm Sanders
5. (Ukraine) Lesia Tsurenko

=== Qualifying draw ===
==== First qualifier ====
First round
1	(Croatia) Petra Martić	6^{3}	7	4
WC	(United States) Christina McHale	7^{7}	5	6
Olga Govortsova	0	3
15	(Hungary) Dalma Gálfi	6	6

Qualifying competition
WC	(United States) Christina McHale	6	4	2
15	(Hungary) Dalma Gálfi	2	6	6

==== Second qualifier ====
First round
2	(China) Wang Xinyu	6	6
WC	(United States) Elvina Kalieva	1	2
(Australia) Storm Sanders	6	5	6
17	(Germany) Jule Niemeier	1	7	4

Qualifying competition
2	(China) Wang Xinyu	6	6
(Australia) Storm Sanders	2	4

==== Third qualifier ====
First round
3	(Slovenia) Kaja Juvan	4	0^{r}
(China) Zhu Lin	6	3
SR	(Ukraine) Katarina Zavatska	3	2
24	(Canada) Rebecca Marino	6	6

Qualifying competition
(China) Zhu Lin	3	2
24	(Canada) Rebecca Marino	6	6

==== Fourth qualifier ====
First round
4	(Italy) Martina Trevisan	3	3
(China) Yuan Yue	6	6
SR	(Germany) Tatjana Maria	6	6
23	(United Kingdom) Harriet Dart	3	3

Qualifying competition
(China) Yuan Yue	3	6	6
SR	(Germany) Tatjana Maria	6	3	2

==== Fifth qualifier ====
First round
5	(United States) Claire Liu	4	5
(Ukraine) Lesia Tsurenko	6	7
WC	(Sweden) Mirjam Björklund	6	2	2
19	Vera Zvonareva	1	6	6

Qualifying competition
(Ukraine) Lesia Tsurenko	6	4	2
19	Vera Zvonareva	3	6	6

==== Sixth qualifier ====
First round
6	(Poland) Magdalena Fręch	6	4	6
WC	(United States) Whitney Osuigwe	3	6	4
(Switzerland) Stefanie Vögele	7^{7}	6
20	(Serbia) Aleksandra Krunić	6^{4}	2

Qualifying competition
6	(Poland) Magdalena Fręch	7	6
(Switzerland) Stefanie Vögele	5	1

==== Seventh qualifier ====
First round
7	Anna Kalinskaya	5	6	6
(Germany) Anna-Lena Friedsam	7	4	4
WC	(United States) Caroline Dolehide	6	3
13	(Ukraine) Dayana Yastremska	3	0^{r}

Qualifying competition
7	Anna Kalinskaya	7	6
WC	(United States) Caroline Dolehide	5	4

==== Eighth qualifier ====
First round
8	(France) Harmony Tan	6	6
(Ukraine) Daria Snigur	3	2
(Australia) Maddison Inglis	7^{7}	4	5
21	(Georgia (country)) Ekaterine Gorgodze	6^{5}	6	7

Qualifying competition
8	(France) Harmony Tan	2	6	6^{5}
21	(Georgia (country)) Ekaterine Gorgodze	6	3	7^{7}

==== Ninth qualifier ====
First round
9	(United States) Lauren Davis	6	6
SR	(Australia) Priscilla Hon	4	0
(China) Wang Xiyu	6	6
16	(France) Chloé Paquet	1	4

Qualifying competition
9	(United States) Lauren Davis	7^{8}	6
(China) Wang Xiyu	6^{6}	4

==== Tenth qualifier ====
First round
10	(Czech Republic) Marie Bouzková	1	7^{7}	6
Anastasia Gasanova	6	6^{5}	4
(Japan) Mai Hontama	2	4
22	Anastasia Potapova	6	6

Qualifying competition
10	(Czech Republic) Marie Bouzková	6	3	6
22	Anastasia Potapova	3	6	4

==== Eleventh qualifier ====
First round
11	(France) Diane Parry	6	4	5
SR	(Belgium) Kirsten Flipkens	4	6	7
WC	(United States) Alycia Parks	6	6
18	Kamilla Rakhimova	3	4

Qualifying competition
SR	(Belgium) Kirsten Flipkens	7	6
WC	(United States) Alycia Parks	5	1

==== Twelfth qualifier ====
First round
12	(Italy) Lucia Bronzetti	4	6	6
(Netherlands) Lesley Pattinama Kerkhove	6	2	3
(Mexico) Renata Zarazúa	2	1
14	(China) Wang Qiang	6	6

Qualifying competition
12	(Italy) Lucia Bronzetti	3	2
14	(China) Wang Qiang	6	6
