= 2022 Miami Open – Women's doubles =

Women's doubles
- 2022 Miami Open

Final
- Champions: (Germany) Laura Siegemund; Vera Zvonareva
- Runners-up: Veronika Kudermetova (Belgium) Elise Mertens
- Score: 7–6^{(7–3)}, 7–5

Details
- Draw: 32 (3 WC )
- Seeds: 8

Events
Singles	men	women
Doubles	men	women
← 2021 ·	Miami Open	· 2023 →

Laura Siegemund and Vera Zvonareva defeated Veronika Kudermetova and Elise Mertens in the final, 7–6^{(7–3)}, 7–5 to win the women's doubles title at the 2022 Miami Open.

Shuko Aoyama and Ena Shibahara were the defending champions, but they chose not to defend their title together. Aoyama partnered with Chan Hao-ching, but lost in the first round to Lyudmyla Kichenok and Jeļena Ostapenko. Shibahara partnered with Asia Muhammad, but lost in the second round to Alicja Rosolska and Erin Routliffe.

== Seeds ==
1. Veronika Kudermetova / (Belgium) Elise Mertens (final)
2. (Australia) Storm Sanders / (Czech Republic) Kateřina Siniaková (withdrew)
3. (Australia) Samantha Stosur / (China) Zhang Shuai (first round)
4. (United States) Coco Gauff / (United States) Caty McNally (semifinals)
5. (Croatia) Darija Jurak Schreiber / (Slovenia) Andreja Klepač (first round)
6. (Canada) Gabriela Dabrowski / (Mexico) Giuliana Olmos (second round)
7. (United States) Desirae Krawczyk / (Netherlands) Demi Schuurs (second round)
8. (Czech Republic) Marie Bouzková / (Czech Republic) Lucie Hradecká (first round)

== Draw ==
=== Key ===
- Q = Qualifier
- WC = Wild card
- LL = Lucky loser
- Alt = Alternate
- SE = Special exempt
- PR = Protected ranking
- ITF = ITF entry
- JE = Junior exempt
- w/o = Walkover
- r = Retired
- d = Defaulted
- SR = Special ranking

=== Finals ===
Semifinals
1	Veronika Kudermetova (Belgium) Elise Mertens	6	3	[10]
4	(United States) Coco Gauff (United States) Caty McNally	4	6	[2]
Alt	Ekaterina Alexandrova (China) Yang Zhaoxuan	6	2	[11]
PR	(Germany) Laura Siegemund; Vera Zvonareva	3	6	[13]

Final
1	Veronika Kudermetova (Belgium) Elise Mertens	6^{3}	5
PR	(Germany) Laura Siegemund; Vera Zvonareva	7^{7}	7

=== Top half ===
First round
1	V Kudermetova (Belgium) E Mertens	6	6
(Italy) J Paolini (Slovenia) T Zidanšek	2	1
(Japan) E Hozumi (Japan) M Ninomiya	6	6
WC	(United States) M Keys (United States) J Pegula	3	0
(Romania) I-C Begu (Romania) M Niculescu	6^{3}	6^{4}
(Poland) A Rosolska (New Zealand) E Routliffe	7^{7}	7^{7}
(United States) A Muhammad (Japan) E Shibahara	4	6	[12]
8	(Czech Republic) M Bouzková (Czech Republic) L Hradecká	6	3	[10]
4	(United States) C Gauff (United States) C McNally	6	6
PR	(Slovakia) T Mihalíková (Czech Republic) K Peschke	0	3
(Chile) A Guarachi (China) Y Xu	3	7^{7}	[11]
(Ukraine) N Kichenok (Romania) R Olaru	6	6^{4}	[9]
(Japan) S Aoyama (Chinese Taipei) H-c Chan	4	5
(Ukraine) L Kichenok (Latvia) J Ostapenko	6	7
(France) A Cornet (Switzerland) J Teichmann	6	6
5	(Croatia) D Jurak Schreiber (Slovenia) A Klepač	0	4

Second round
1	V Kudermetova (Belgium) E Mertens	6	3	[10]
(Japan) E Hozumi (Japan) M Ninomiya	2	6	[8]
(Poland) A Rosolska (New Zealand) E Routliffe	6	3	[10]
(United States) A Muhammad (Japan) E Shibahara	4	6	[6]
4	(United States) C Gauff (United States) C McNally	6^{6}	7^{8}	[10]
(Chile) A Guarachi (China) Y Xu	7^{8}	6^{6}	[8]
(Ukraine) L Kichenok (Latvia) J Ostapenko	1	3
(France) A Cornet (Switzerland) J Teichmann	6	6

Quarterfinals
1	V Kudermetova (Belgium) E Mertens	6	3	[11]
(Poland) A Rosolska (New Zealand) E Routliffe	3	6	[9]
4	(United States) C Gauff (United States) C McNally	7	6^{4}	[10]
(France) A Cornet (Switzerland) J Teichmann	5	7^{7}	[7]

Semifinals
1	V Kudermetova (Belgium) E Mertens	6	3	[10]
4	(United States) C Gauff (United States) C McNally	4	6	[2]

=== Bottom half ===
First round
7	(United States) D Krawczyk (Netherlands) D Schuurs	6	4	[10]
(Georgia (country)) E Gorgodze (Belgium) G Minnen	2	6	[5]
WC	(Canada) L Fernandez (United States) I Neel	3	6^{2}
PR	(Belgium) K Flipkens (India) S Mirza	6	7^{7}
(Spain) P Badosa; A Sabalenka	6	6
(Kazakhstan) A Danilina (Brazil) B Haddad Maia	3	4
Alt	E Alexandrova (China) Z Yang	6	6
3	(Australia) S Stosur (China) S Zhang	4	4
6	(Canada) G Dabrowski (Mexico) G Olmos	6	6
L Marozava (United States) S Santamaria	1	3
PR	(Germany) L Siegemund; V Zvonareva	6	6
N Dzalamidze (Norway) U Eikeri	1	2
WC	(Switzerland) B Bencic (Croatia) A Konjuh	6	6^{4}	[10]
(Ukraine) A Kalinina (Kazakhstan) E Rybakina	2	7^{7}	[7]
PR	A Panova (Australia) An Rodionova	1	3
Alt	(Poland) M Linette (Spain) S Sorribes Tormo	6	6

Second round
7	(United States) D Krawczyk (Netherlands) D Schuurs	2	4
PR	(Belgium) K Flipkens (India) S Mirza	6	6
(Spain) P Badosa; A Sabalenka	3	6^{7}
Alt	E Alexandrova (China) Z Yang	6	7^{9}
6	(Canada) G Dabrowski (Mexico) G Olmos	6^{4}	3
PR	(Germany) L Siegemund; V Zvonareva	7^{7}	6
WC	(Switzerland) B Bencic (Croatia) A Konjuh	2	3
Alt	(Poland) M Linette (Spain) S Sorribes Tormo	6	6

Quarterfinals
PR	(Belgium) K Flipkens (India) S Mirza	3	6^{3}
Alt	E Alexandrova (China) Z Yang	6	7^{7}
PR	(Germany) L Siegemund; V Zvonareva	3	6	[10]
Alt	(Poland) M Linette (Spain) S Sorribes Tormo	6	1	[7]

Semifinals
Alt	E Alexandrova (China) Z Yang	6	2	[11]
PR	(Germany) L Siegemund; V Zvonareva	3	6	[13]

== Seeded teams ==
The following are the seeded teams. Seedings are based on WTA rankings as of March 7, 2022.

Country	Player	Country	Player	Rank	Seed
	Veronika Kudermetova	BEL	Elise Mertens	9	1
~~AUS~~	~~Storm Sanders~~	~~CZE~~	~~Kateřina Siniaková~~	~~18~~	~~2~~
AUS	Samantha Stosur	CHN	Zhang Shuai	19	3
USA	Coco Gauff	USA	Caty McNally	25	4
CRO	Darija Jurak Schreiber	SLO	Andreja Klepač	27	5
CAN	Gabriela Dabrowski	MEX	Giuliana Olmos	30	6
USA	Desirae Krawczyk	NED	Demi Schuurs	36	7
CZE	Marie Bouzková	CZE	Lucie Hradecká	45	8

== Other entry information ==
=== Wildcards ===
- (Switzerland) Belinda Bencic / (Croatia) Ana Konjuh
- (Canada) Leylah Fernandez / (United States) Ingrid Neel
- ~~(United States) Ashlyn Krueger / (United States) Robin Montgomery~~

=== Alternates ===
- Ekaterina Alexandrova / (China) Yang Zhaoxuan
- (Poland) Magda Linette / (Spain) Sara Sorribes Tormo

=== Protected ranking ===
- (Belgium) Kirsten Flipkens / (India) Sania Mirza
- (Slovakia) Tereza Mihalíková / (Czech Republic) Květa Peschke
- Alexandra Panova / (Australia) Anastasia Rodionova
- (Germany) Laura Siegemund / Vera Zvonareva

=== Withdrawals ===
- (Chile) Alexa Guarachi / (United States) Nicole Melichar-Martinez → replaced by (Chile) Alexa Guarachi / (China) Xu Yifan
- (Czech Republic) Barbora Krejčíková / (Czech Republic) Kateřina Siniaková → replaced by (Poland) Magda Linette / (Spain) Sara Sorribes Tormo
- (United States) Ashlyn Krueger / (United States) Robin Montgomery → replaced by Ekaterina Alexandrova / (China) Yang Zhaoxuan
- (Poland) Magda Linette / (United States) Bernarda Pera → replaced by Lidziya Marozava / (United States) Sabrina Santamaria
- (Croatia) Petra Martić / (United States) Shelby Rogers → replaced by Alexandra Panova / (Australia) Anastasia Rodionova
