= 2012 Tevlin Women's Challenger – Singles =

Singles
- 2012 Tevlin Women's Challenger

Final
- Champion: (Canada) Eugenie Bouchard
- Runner-up: (Canada) Sharon Fichman
- Score: 6–1, 6–2

Events
Singles	Doubles
- Tevlin Women's Challenger

Amra Sadiković was the defending champion, but chose not to participate.

Eugenie Bouchard won the all-Canadian final 6–1, 6–2 over Sharon Fichman.

== Seeds ==
1. (United States) Maria Sanchez (semifinals)
2. (Canada) Stéphanie Dubois (quarterfinals)
3. (United States) Jessica Pegula (semifinals)
4. (Canada) Eugenie Bouchard (champion)
5. (Canada) Sharon Fichman (final)
6. (Germany) Kathrin Wörle (first round)
7. (Russia) Alla Kudryavtseva (quarterfinals)
8. (United States) Julia Boserup (first round)

== Main draw ==
Key

- Q = Qualifier
- WC = Wild card
- LL = Lucky loser
- Alt = Alternate
- ITF = ITF entry
- PR = Protected ranking
- SR = Special ranking
- SE = Special exempt
- JE = Junior exempt
- JR = Junior Accelerator Programme entrant
- CO = College Accelerator Programme entrant
- NG = Next Gen Accelerator Program entrant
- w/o = Walkover
- r = Retired
- d = Defaulted

=== Finals ===
Semifinals
1	(United States) Maria Sanchez	5	2
4	(Canada) Eugenie Bouchard	7	6
3	(United States) Jessica Pegula	6^{1}	5
5	(Canada) Sharon Fichman	7^{7}	7

Final
4	(Canada) Eugenie Bouchard	6	6
5	(Canada) Sharon Fichman	1	2

=== Top half ===
First round
1	(United States) M Sanchez	6	6
Q	(Canada) S Molnar	3	4
Q	(Canada) C Zhao	5	4
(United States) S Vickery	7	6
(United States) S Crawford	7	0	1
(Canada) G Dabrowski	5	6	6
WC	(Canada) R Marino	6	7^{10}
6	(Germany) K Wörle	4	6^{8}
4	(Canada) E Bouchard	6	6
(Austria) N Rottmann	0	3
(Germany) K Grajdek	2	0
(United States) A Mueller	6	6
(United States) C-Y Hsu	3	1
(Slovakia) M Hončová	6	6
(United Kingdom) S Murray	6	6
8	(United States) J Boserup	3	1

Second round
1	(United States) M Sanchez	6	5	7^{7}
(United States) S Vickery	1	7	6^{1}
(Canada) G Dabrowski	6	3
WC	(Canada) R Marino	1	1^{r}
4	(Canada) E Bouchard	6	6
(United States) A Mueller	1	0
(Slovakia) M Hončová	4	6	6
(United Kingdom) S Murray	6	1	2

Quarterfinals
1	(United States) M Sanchez	7	4	6
(Canada) G Dabrowski	5	6	0
4	(Canada) E Bouchard	6	6
(Slovakia) M Hončová	1	0

Semifinals
1	(United States) M Sanchez	5	2
4	(Canada) E Bouchard	7	6

=== Bottom half ===
First round
7	(Russia) A Kudryavtseva	6	6
(United States) L Litvak	1	3
(Oman) F Al Nabhani	7^{7}	2	7
(United States) A Will	6^{2}	6	5
Q	(Canada) E Fournier	6	6
Q	(France) S Benamar	2	3
(United States) A Kiick	3	5
3	(United States) J Pegula	6	7
5	(Canada) S Fichman	6	7
WC	(Canada) G Liang	2	5
WC	(Canada) E Routliffe	6	6
(United States) J Abaza	2	0
(Germany) A Zaja	6	6
(Poland) J Jegiołka	2	2
WC	(Canada) F Abanda	2	6^{6}
2	(Canada) S Dubois	6	7^{8}

Second round
7	(Russia) A Kudryavtseva	7	6
(Oman) F Al Nabhani	5	2
Q	(Canada) E Fournier	3	0
3	(United States) J Pegula	6	6
5	(Canada) S Fichman	6	6
WC	(Canada) E Routliffe	2	1
(Germany) A Zaja	2	1^{r}
2	(Canada) S Dubois	6	3

Quarterfinals
7	(Russia) A Kudryavtseva	5	0
3	(United States) J Pegula	7	6
5	(Canada) S Fichman	6^{6}	6	6
2	(Canada) S Dubois	7^{8}	1	1

Semifinals
3	(United States) J Pegula	6^{1}	5
5	(Canada) S Fichman	7^{7}	7
