= 2023 Miami Open – Women's doubles =

Women's doubles
- 2023 Miami Open

Final
- Champions: (United States) Coco Gauff (United States) Jessica Pegula
- Runners-up: (Canada) Leylah Fernandez (United States) Taylor Townsend
- Score: 7–6^{(8–6)}, 6–2

Details
- Draw: 32 (3 WC )
- Seeds: 8

Events
Singles	men	women
Doubles	men	women
← 2022 ·	Miami Open	· 2024 →

Coco Gauff and Jessica Pegula defeated Leylah Fernandez and Taylor Townsend in the final, 7–6^{(8–6)}, 6–2 to win the women's doubles tennis title at the 2023 Miami Open. This marked the first all-North American final in the history of the event.

Laura Siegemund and Vera Zvonareva were the defending champions, but lost to Magda Linette and Bernarda Pera in the second round.

== Seeds ==
1. (Czech Republic) Barbora Krejčíková / (Czech Republic) Kateřina Siniaková (withdrew)
2. (United States) Coco Gauff / (United States) Jessica Pegula (champions)
3. (Ukraine) Lyudmyla Kichenok / (Latvia) Jeļena Ostapenko (quarterfinals)
4. (United States) Desirae Krawczyk / (Netherlands) Demi Schuurs (first round)
5. (China) Xu Yifan / (China) Yang Zhaoxuan (second round)
6. (Australia) Storm Hunter / (Belgium) Elise Mertens (quarterfinals)
7. (Brazil) Beatriz Haddad Maia / (Mexico) Giuliana Olmos (second round)
8. (United States) Nicole Melichar-Martinez / (Australia) Ellen Perez (semifinals)
9. (Canada) Gabriela Dabrowski / (Brazil) Luisa Stefani (first round)

== Draw ==
=== Key ===
- Q = Qualifier
- WC = Wild card
- LL = Lucky loser
- Alt = Alternate
- SE = Special exempt
- PR = Protected ranking
- ITF = ITF entry
- JE = Junior exempt
- w/o = Walkover
- r = Retired
- d = Defaulted
- SR = Special ranking

=== Finals ===
Semifinals
(Poland) Magda Linette (United States) Bernarda Pera	6	2	[12]
(Canada) Leylah Fernandez (United States) Taylor Townsend	1	6	[14]
8	(United States) Nicole Melichar-Martinez (Australia) Ellen Perez	6^{5}	6^{4}
2	(United States) Coco Gauff (United States) Jessica Pegula	7^{7}	7^{7}

Final
(Canada) Leylah Fernandez (United States) Taylor Townsend	6^{6}	2
2	(United States) Coco Gauff (United States) Jessica Pegula	7^{8}	6

=== Top half ===
First round
9	(Canada) G Dabrowski (Brazil) L Stefani	4	6	[5]
(Poland) M Linette (United States) B Pera	6	2	[10]
WC	(United States) M Jones (United States) S Stephens	2	6	[5]
(Germany) L Siegemund; V Zvonareva	6	4	[10]
Alt	(Romania) I-C Begu (Ukraine) A Kalinina	3	6	[10]
(Japan) S Aoyama (Japan) E Shibahara	6	1	[6]
(Chile) A Guarachi (New Zealand) E Routliffe	6	5	[5]
5	(China) Y Xu (China) Z Yang	3	7	[10]
3	(Ukraine) L Kichenok (Latvia) J Ostapenko	3	6	[10]
WC	(United States) D Collins (United States) P Stearns	6	1	[8]
(United States) C Dolehide (United States) M Keys	4	4
V Kudermetova; L Samsonova	6	6
(Hungary) T Babos (France) K Mladenovic	4	6^{3}
(Canada) L Fernandez (United States) T Townsend	6	7^{7}
(Czech Republic) M Bouzková; D Kasatkina	2	3
7	(Brazil) B Haddad Maia (Mexico) G Olmos	6	6

Second round
(Poland) M Linette (United States) B Pera	6	7^{7}
(Germany) L Siegemund; V Zvonareva	1	6^{5}
Alt	(Romania) I-C Begu (Ukraine) A Kalinina	7^{8}	6
5	(China) Y Xu (China) Z Yang	6^{6}	2
3	(Ukraine) L Kichenok (Latvia) J Ostapenko	7^{7}	7^{7}
V Kudermetova; L Samsonova	6^{4}	6^{3}
(Canada) L Fernandez (United States) T Townsend	6	7^{7}
7	(Brazil) B Haddad Maia (Mexico) G Olmos	4	6^{4}

Quarterfinals
(Poland) M Linette (United States) B Pera	6	7^{7}
Alt	(Romania) I-C Begu (Ukraine) A Kalinina	3	6^{5}
3	(Ukraine) L Kichenok (Latvia) J Ostapenko	6	6^{4}	[8]
(Canada) L Fernandez (United States) T Townsend	2	7^{7}	[10]

Semifinals
(Poland) M Linette (United States) B Pera	6	2	[12]
(Canada) L Fernandez (United States) T Townsend	1	6	[14]

=== Bottom half ===
First round
8	(United States) N Melichar-Martinez (Australia) E Perez	6	6^{5}	[15]
PR	(United States) S Kenin (Ukraine) N Kichenok	3	7^{7}	[13]
A Kalinskaya (United States) C McNally	6	6
(Hungary) A Bondár (Belgium) K Zimmermann	1	3
Alt	E Alexandrova (Slovakia) T Mihalíková	5	6	[10]
(Japan) E Hozumi (United States) A Parks	7	2	[8]
(Chinese Taipei) H-c Chan (Chinese Taipei) L Chan	6	7^{11}
4	(United States) D Krawczyk (Netherlands) D Schuurs	3	6^{9}
6	(Australia) S Hunter (Belgium) E Mertens	6	7^{7}
(Japan) M Kato (Indonesia) A Sutjiadi	3	6^{1}
(Romania) M Niculescu (Poland) A Rosolska	6	7^{7}
PR	(Belgium) K Flipkens (United States) B Mattek-Sands	2	6^{4}
(Kazakhstan) A Danilina (United States) A Muhammad	6	6
(Spain) P Badosa (Tunisia) O Jabeur	4	4
WC	(Czech Republic) B Fruhvirtová (Czech Republic) L Fruhvirtová	3	6	[4]
2	(United States) C Gauff (United States) J Pegula	6	4	[10]

Second round
8	(United States) N Melichar-Martinez (Australia) E Perez	6^{7}	6	[11]
A Kalinskaya (United States) C McNally	7^{9}	4	[9]
Alt	E Alexandrova (Slovakia) T Mihalíková	5	3
(Chinese Taipei) H-c Chan (Chinese Taipei) L Chan	7	6
6	(Australia) S Hunter (Belgium) E Mertens	6	6
(Romania) M Niculescu (Poland) A Rosolska	3	2
(Kazakhstan) A Danilina (United States) A Muhammad	4	6^{4}
2	(United States) C Gauff (United States) J Pegula	6	7^{7}

Quarterfinals
8	(United States) N Melichar-Martinez (Australia) E Perez	3	7	[10]
(Chinese Taipei) H-c Chan (Chinese Taipei) L Chan	6	5	[2]
6	(Australia) S Hunter (Belgium) E Mertens	7^{7}	5	[2]
2	(United States) C Gauff (United States) J Pegula	6^{4}	7	[10]

Semifinals
8	(United States) N Melichar-Martinez (Australia) E Perez	6^{5}	6^{4}
2	(United States) C Gauff (United States) J Pegula	7^{7}	7^{7}

== Seeded teams ==
The following are the seeded teams. Seedings are based on WTA rankings as of March 6, 2023.

Country	Player	Country	Player	Rank	Seed
~~CZE~~	~~Barbora Krejčíková~~	~~CZE~~	~~Kateřina Siniaková~~	~~3~~	~~1~~
USA	Coco Gauff	USA	Jessica Pegula	8	2
UKR	Lyudmyla Kichenok	LAT	Jeļena Ostapenko	18	3
USA	Desirae Krawczyk	NED	Demi Schuurs	22	4
CHN	Xu Yifan	CHN	Yang Zhaoxuan	25	5
AUS	Storm Hunter	BEL	Elise Mertens	27	6
BRA	Beatriz Haddad Maia	MEX	Giuliana Olmos	33	7
USA	Nicole Melichar-Martinez	AUS	Ellen Perez	35	8
CAN	Gabriela Dabrowski	BRA	Luisa Stefani	36	9

== Other entry information ==
=== Wildcards ===
- (United States) Danielle Collins / (United States) Peyton Stearns
- (Czech Republic) Brenda Fruhvirtová / (Czech Republic) Linda Fruhvirtová
- (United States) Makenna Jones / (United States) Sloane Stephens

=== Protected ranking ===
- (Belgium) Kirsten Flipkens / (United States) Bethanie Mattek-Sands
- (United States) Sofia Kenin / (Ukraine) Nadiia Kichenok

=== Alternates ===
- Ekaterina Alexandrova / (Slovakia) Tereza Mihalíková
- (Romania) Irina-Camelia Begu / (Ukraine) Anhelina Kalinina

=== Withdrawals ===
- (Czech Republic) Barbora Krejčíková / (Czech Republic) Kateřina Siniaková → replaced by Ekaterina Alexandrova / (Slovakia) Tereza Mihalíková
- (Japan) Makoto Ninomiya / (China) Zheng Saisai → replaced by (Romania) Irina-Camelia Begu / (Ukraine) Anhelina Kalinina
