= 2012 Tevlin Women's Challenger – Doubles =

Doubles
- 2012 Tevlin Women's Challenger

Final
- Champions: (Canada) Gabriela Dabrowski (Russia) Alla Kudryavtseva
- Runners-up: (Canada) Eugenie Bouchard (United States) Jessica Pegula
- Score: 6–2, 7–6^{(7–2)}

Events
Singles	Doubles
- Tevlin Women's Challenger

Gabriela Dabrowski and Marie-Ève Pelletier were the defending champions. Pelletier chose not to participate, so Dabrowski partnered with Alla Kudryavtseva and won the title 6–2, 7–6^{(7–2)} over Eugenie Bouchard and Jessica Pegula.

== Seeds ==
1. (Canada) Gabriela Dabrowski / (Russia) Alla Kudryavtseva (champions)
2. (Canada) Eugenie Bouchard / (United States) Jessica Pegula (final)
3. (United States) Lena Litvak / (United Kingdom) Samantha Murray (first round)
4. (United States) Macall Harkins / (Austria) Nicole Rottmann (first round)

== Draw ==
Key

- Q = Qualifier
- WC = Wild card
- LL = Lucky loser
- Alt = Alternate
- ITF = ITF entry
- PR = Protected ranking
- SR = Special ranking
- SE = Special exempt
- JE = Junior exempt
- JR = Junior Accelerator Programme entrant
- CO = College Accelerator Programme entrant
- NG = Next Gen Accelerator Program entrant
- w/o = Walkover
- r = Retired
- d = Defaulted

First round
1	(Canada) G Dabrowski (Russia) A Kudryavtseva	6	6
(United States) S Crawford (United States) A Kiick	0	4
(Germany) K Grajdek (Slovakia) M Hončová	6	6
WC	(Canada) E Fournier (Canada) G Liang	1	4
4	(United States) M Harkins (Austria) N Rottmann	3	6	[7]
(United States) EJ Harman (United States) C-Y Hsu	6	3	[10]
WC	(Canada) F Abanda (United States) S Vickery	w/o
(United States) A Mueller (Germany) A Zaja
(United States) J Abaza (United States) E Clark	1	6	[3]
(Canada) E Routliffe (Canada) C Zhao	6	1	[10]
(United States) M Sanchez (United States) A Will	6	6
3	(United States) L Litvak (United Kingdom) S Murray	3	3
(Canada) S Molnar (Canada) C Petrick	6	6
(Oman) F Al Nabhani (Germany) K Wörle	4	0
WC	(Canada) S Dubois (Canada) R Marino	5	6	[7]
2	(Canada) E Bouchard (United States) J Pegula	7	3	[10]

Quarterfinals
1	(Canada) G Dabrowski (Russia) A Kudryavtseva	6	6
(Germany) K Grajdek (Slovakia) M Hončová	2	2
(United States) EJ Harman (United States) C-Y Hsu	4	6^{4}
WC	(Canada) F Abanda (United States) S Vickery	6	7^{7}
(Canada) E Routliffe (Canada) C Zhao	4	3
(United States) M Sanchez (United States) A Will	6	6
(Canada) S Molnar (Canada) C Petrick	0	2
2	(Canada) E Bouchard (United States) J Pegula	6	6

Semifinals
1	(Canada) G Dabrowski (Russia) A Kudryavtseva	6	6
WC	(Canada) F Abanda (United States) S Vickery	2	1
(United States) M Sanchez (United States) A Will	3	3
2	(Canada) E Bouchard (United States) J Pegula	6	6

Finals
1	(Canada) G Dabrowski (Russia) A Kudryavtseva	6	7^{7}
2	(Canada) E Bouchard (United States) J Pegula	2	6^{2}
