= 2014 South Seas Island Resort Women's Pro Classic =

- Date: November 3–9
- Edition: 2nd
- Category: ITF Women's Circuit
- Prize money: $50,000
- Surface: Hard
- Location: Captiva Island, United States
- Venue: South Seas Island Resort

Champions

Singles
- (Romania) Edina Gallovits-Hall

Doubles
- (Canada) Gabriela Dabrowski / (United States) Anna Tatishvili
← 2013 ·	South Seas Island Resort Women's Pro Classic

The 2014 South Seas Island Resort Women's Pro Classic was a professional tennis tournament played on outdoor hard courts. It was the second edition of the tournament which was part of the 2014 ITF Women's Circuit, offering a total of $50,000 in prize money. It took place in Captiva Island, Florida, United States, on November 3–9, 2014.

== Singles entrants ==
=== Seeds ===
Country	Player	Rank^{1}	Seed
USA	Grace Min	102	1
SRB	Jovana Jakšić	115	2
USA	Anna Tatishvili	117	3
SUI	Romina Oprandi	119	4
AUS	Olivia Rogowska	124	5
POR	Michelle Larcher de Brito	125	6
USA	Irina Falconi	132	7
PAR	Verónica Cepede Royg	139	8

- ^{1} Rankings as of October 27, 2014

=== Other entrants ===
The following players received wildcards into the singles main draw:

- (United States) CiCi Bellis
- (United States) Edina Gallovits-Hall
- (United States) Anne-Liz Jeukeng
- (United States) Bernarda Pera

The following players received entry from the qualifying draw:

- (Ukraine) Kateryna Bondarenko
- (Japan) Mayo Hibi
- (Germany) Tatjana Maria
- (Italy) Jasmine Paolini

The following player received entry into the singles main draw as a lucky loser:

- (Brazil) Beatriz Haddad Maia

The following players received entry with a special exempt:

- (United States) Jennifer Brady
- (United States) Maria Sanchez

The following player received entry with a protected ranking:

- (United States) Alexa Glatch

== Champions ==
=== Singles ===
- (Romania) Edina Gallovits-Hall def. (Croatia) Petra Martić 6–2, 6–2

=== Doubles ===
- (Canada) Gabriela Dabrowski / (United States) Anna Tatishvili def. (United States) Asia Muhammad / (United States) Maria Sanchez 6–3, 6–3
