= 2021 National Bank Open =

Canadian tennis tournament

- Date: August 6–15, 2021
- Edition: 131st (men) / 119th (women)
- Category: ATP Tour Masters 1000 (men); WTA 1000 (women)
- Surface: Hard / outdoor
- Location: Toronto, Ontario, Canada (men); Montreal, Canada (women)

Champions

Men's singles
- (Russia) Daniil Medvedev

Women's singles
- (Italy) Camila Giorgi

Men's doubles
- (United States) Rajeev Ram / (United Kingdom) Joe Salisbury

Women's doubles
- (Canada) Gabriela Dabrowski / (Brazil) Luisa Stefani
- Canadian Open (tennis)

The 2021 Canadian Open (branded as the 2021 National Bank Open presented by Rogers for sponsorship reasons) were outdoor hard court tennis tournaments played from August 6 to August 15, 2021, as part of the 2021 US Open Series. The men's event took place at the Aviva Centre in Toronto, and the women's tournament at the IGA Stadium in Montreal. It was the 131st edition of the men's tournament—a Masters 1000 tournament on the 2021 ATP Tour, and the 119th edition of the women's tournament—a WTA 1000 tournament on the 2021 WTA Tour.

They were originally scheduled to be played from August 8 to August 16, 2020, as part of the 2020 tennis season. Due to the COVID-19 pandemic, the 2020 edition of the Canadian Open was postponed to 2021 by Tennis Canada.

== Impact of the COVID-19 pandemic, postponement to 2021 ==
The men's and women's tournaments alternate between Toronto and Montreal annually. On April 11, 2020, pursuant to a request by the province of Quebec (the COVID-19 pandemic in Quebec was the centre of the first wave of the pandemic in Canada) for all cultural and sporting events to be cancelled through August, Tennis Canada announced that the women's half of the Canadian Open, as part of the 2020 WTA Tour, would be postponed and held in Montreal in 2021.

The men's half of the event was still tentatively scheduled, but was still at risk of cancellation or postponement if the ATP and WTA extended their suspension of play into August, or if Toronto or the province of Ontario made a similar order that also applies to the period. Toronto had already cancelled all city-led major events, festivals, conferences, permits and cultural programs until June 30, 2020. Although subject to provincial restrictions on public gatherings, Mayor John Tory stated that these did not necessarily bar the hosting of sporting events.

On June 17, 2020, Tennis Canada officially announced that the men's tournament had also been postponed to 2021, citing logistical and safety issues that would be present for players and staff even if the event were to be held behind closed doors, including a federal health order requiring 14 days self-isolation upon arrival for anyone travelling to Canada. As Tennis Canada officially considered this cancellation to be a postponement, the same host cities intended for 2020 were carried over to 2021, modifying the traditional rotation: Toronto and Montreal now host the men's and women's tournaments respectively in odd-numbered years.

On February 1, 2021, National Bank was promoted to title sponsor of the tournament, replacing Rogers Communications, which now serves as presenting sponsor.

== Points and prize money ==
=== Point distribution ===
Event	W	F	SF	QF	Round of 16	Round of 32	Round of 64	Q	Q2	Q1
Men's singles	1000	600	360	180	90	45	10	25	16	0
Men's doubles	1000	600	360	180	90	0	—N/a	—N/a	—N/a	—N/a
Women's singles	900	585	350	190	105	60	1	30	20	1
Women's doubles	900	585	350	190	105	5	—N/a	—N/a	—N/a	—N/a

=== Prize money ===
Event	W	F	SF	QF	Round of 16	Round of 32	Round of 64	Q2	Q1
Men's singles	$370,290	$211,000	$121,250	$74,000	$45,000	$26,770	$15,845	$8,350	$4,445
Women's singles	$221,500	$164,000	$87,000	$41,500	$21,000	$13,300	$10,750	$5,080	$3,250
Men's doubles*	$68,440	$47,910	$32,840	$22,240	$15,050	$10,270	—N/a	—N/a	—N/a
Women's doubles*	$67,000	$43,990	$27,500	$13,800	$8,700	$6,500	—N/a	—N/a	—N/a

_{*per team}

== Champions ==
=== Men's singles ===
- (Russia) Daniil Medvedev def. (United States) Reilly Opelka, 6–4, 6–3.

=== Women's singles ===
- (Italy) Camila Giorgi def. (Czech Republic) Karolína Plíšková, 6–3, 7–5.

This was Giorgi's third WTA Tour singles title, and first at WTA 1000 level.

=== Men's doubles ===
- (United States) Rajeev Ram / (United Kingdom) Joe Salisbury def. (Croatia) Nikola Mektić / (Croatia) Mate Pavić, 6–3, 4–6, [10–3]

=== Women's doubles ===
- (Canada) Gabriela Dabrowski / (Brazil) Luisa Stefani def. (Croatia) Darija Jurak / (Slovenia) Andreja Klepač, 6–3, 6–4

== ATP singles main-draw entrants ==
=== Seeds ===
The following are the seeded players. Rankings are as of August 2, 2021. Points before are as of August 9, 2021.

Because the tournament is being held one week later than the last edition in 2019 and as a result of special ranking adjustment rules due to COVID, the Points before column already reflects either a 50% reduction in the player's 2019 points or the substitution of the player's next best result. Accordingly, the Points defending column has been adjusted to show the greater of (a) 50% of the player's 2019 points and (b) the player's 19th best result.

Following the tournament, players will count either their 2021 points or 50% of their 2019 points, whichever is greater.

In addition, because the tournament is not mandatory in 2021, players may count their next best result instead if that result is better. Accordingly, points after will differ from points before only if the player's 2021 points won exceed points defending.

Seed	Rank	Player	Points before	Points defending^{†}	Points won	Points after	Status
1	2	(Russia) Daniil Medvedev	9,920	300	1,000	10,620	Champion, defeated (United States) Reilly Opelka
~~2~~	~~3~~	(Spain) ~~Rafael Nadal~~	7,815	500	0	7,815^{‡}	Withdrew due to left foot injury
3	4	(Greece) Stefanos Tsitsipas	8,115	(125)	360	8,350	Semifinals lost to (United States) Reilly Opelka
4	7	(Russia) Andrey Rublev	6,005	(180)	90	6,005^{‡}	Third round lost to (United States) John Isner
5	10	(Canada) Denis Shapovalov	3,625	(45)	10	3,625^{‡}	Second round lost to (United States) Frances Tiafoe [LL]
6	12	(Norway) Casper Ruud	3,205	(35)	180	3,350	Quarterfinals lost to (Greece) Stefanos Tsitsipas [3]
7	13	(Poland) Hubert Hurkacz	3,118	(45)	180	3,253	Quarterfinals lost to (Russia) Daniil Medvedev [1]
8	14	(Argentina) Diego Schwartzman	2,913	23	90	2,980	Third round lost to (Spain) Roberto Bautista Agut [10]
9	15	(Canada) Félix Auger-Aliassime	2,693	45	10	2,693^{‡}	Second round lost to (Serbia) Dušan Lajović
10	16	(Spain) Roberto Bautista Agut	2,630	90	180	2,720	Quarterfinals lost to (United States) Reilly Opelka
11	17	(France) Gaël Monfils	2,423	180	180	2,423	Quarterfinals lost to (United States) John Isner
12	18	(Australia) Alex de Minaur	2,600	(45)	10	2,600^{‡}	Second round lost to (Georgia (country)) Nikoloz Basilashvili
13	19	(Chile) Cristian Garín	2,475	(10)	10	2,475	Second round lost to (United States) John Isner
14	21	(Bulgaria) Grigor Dimitrov	2,466	(10)	10	2,466	Second round lost to (United States) Reilly Opelka
15	23	(Russia) Aslan Karatsev	2,287	(15)	10	2,287	Second round lost to (Russia) Karen Khachanov
16	24	(Italy) Jannik Sinner	2,745	(40)	10	2,745^{‡}	Second round lost to (Australia) James Duckworth [Q]

† Due to a change in schedule for the 2021 tournament and COVID ranking adjustment rules, the Points defending column reflects the greater of (a) 50% of the player's 2019 points and (b) the player's 19th best result. Instances of the latter are enclosed in parentheses.

‡ Because the 2021 tournament was non-mandatory, the player substituted his 19th best result instead of the points won in this tournament.

=== Other entrants ===
The following players received wild cards into the main singles draw:

- (United States) Jenson Brooksby
- (Australia) Nick Kyrgios
- (Canada) Vasek Pospisil

The following player received entry using a protected ranking into the main singles draw:

- (Japan) Kei Nishikori

The following player received entry using a special exempt into the main singles draw:

- (United States) Mackenzie McDonald

The following players received entry from the singles qualifying draw:

- (Lithuania) Ričardas Berankis
- (Australia) James Duckworth
- (Japan) Yoshihito Nishioka
- (United States) Tommy Paul
- (Finland) Emil Ruusuvuori
- (Canada) Brayden Schnur

The following players received entry as lucky losers:

- (Spain) Feliciano López
- (United States) Frances Tiafoe

=== Withdrawals ===
Before the tournament

- (Italy) Matteo Berrettini → replaced by (Germany) Jan-Lennard Struff
- (Spain) Pablo Carreño Busta → replaced by (France) Benoît Paire
- (Croatia) Borna Ćorić → replaced by (Australia) John Millman
- (Serbia) Novak Djokovic → replaced by (Serbia) Dušan Lajović
- (Switzerland) Roger Federer → replaced by (Serbia) Miomir Kecmanović
- (Belgium) David Goffin → replaced by (Spain) Albert Ramos Viñolas
- (Spain) Rafael Nadal → replaced by (Spain) Feliciano López
- (Austria) Dominic Thiem → replaced by (United States) Taylor Fritz
- (Canada) Milos Raonic → replaced by (South Africa) Lloyd Harris
- (Switzerland) Stan Wawrinka → replaced by (Croatia) Marin Čilić
- (Germany) Alexander Zverev → replaced by (United States) Frances Tiafoe

During the tournament

- (Japan) Kei Nishikori

== ATP doubles main-draw entrants ==
=== Seeds ===
Country	Player	Country	Player	Rank^{1}	Seed
CRO	Nikola Mektić	CRO	Mate Pavić	3	1
COL	Juan Sebastián Cabal	COL	Robert Farah	15	2
USA	Rajeev Ram	GBR	Joe Salisbury	19	3
GER	Kevin Krawietz	ROU	Horia Tecău	36	4
POL	Łukasz Kubot	BRA	Marcelo Melo	36	5
AUS	John Peers	SVK	Filip Polášek	37	6
GER	Tim Pütz	NZL	Michael Venus	51	7
IND	Rohan Bopanna	CRO	Ivan Dodig	51	8

- Rankings are as of August 2, 2021.

=== Other entrants ===
The following pairs received wildcards into the doubles main draw:

- (Canada) Félix Auger-Aliassime / (Canada) Alexis Galarneau
- (Bulgaria) ~~Grigor Dimitrov / (Canada) Vasek Pospisil~~
- (Canada) Peter Polansky / (Canada) Brayden Schnur

The following pair received entry as alternates:

- (Serbia) Miomir Kecmanović / (Norway) Casper Ruud

=== Withdrawals ===
Before the tournament

- (Bulgaria) Grigor Dimitrov / (Canada) Vasek Pospisil → replaced by (Serbia) Miomir Kecmanović / (Norway) Casper Ruud
- (Spain) Marcel Granollers / (Argentina) Horacio Zeballos → replaced by (Austria) Oliver Marach / (Austria) Philipp Oswald
- (Netherlands) Wesley Koolhof / (Netherlands) Jean-Julien Rojer → replaced by (Netherlands) Wesley Koolhof / (United States) Austin Krajicek
- (Serbia) Filip Krajinović / (Serbia) Dušan Lajović → replaced by (Russia) Aslan Karatsev / (Serbia) Dušan Lajović
- (Germany) Jan-Lennard Struff / (Germany) Alexander Zverev → replaced by (Croatia) Marin Čilić / (Germany) Jan-Lennard Struff

== WTA singles main-draw entrants ==
=== Seeds ===
Country	Player	Rank^{1}	Seed
BLR	Aryna Sabalenka	3	1
CAN	Bianca Andreescu	5	2
UKR	Elina Svitolina	6	3
CZE	Karolína Plíšková	7	4
ESP	Garbiñe Muguruza	9	5
ROU	Simona Halep	10	6
CZE	Petra Kvitová	13	7
BLR	Victoria Azarenka	15	8
BEL	Elise Mertens	17	9
RUS	Anastasia Pavlyuchenkova	18	10
GRE	Maria Sakkari	19	11
KAZ	Elena Rybakina	20	12
TUN	Ons Jabeur	22	13
CZE	Karolína Muchová	23	14
USA	Coco Gauff	25	15
USA	Madison Keys	26	16

- ^{1} Rankings are as of August 2, 2021

=== Other entrants ===
The following players received wild cards into the main singles draw:

- (Canada) Leylah Annie Fernandez
- (Romania) Simona Halep
- (Canada) Rebecca Marino
- (United States) Sloane Stephens
- (Canada) Carol Zhao

The following players received entry from the singles qualifying draw:

- (United States) Amanda Anisimova
- (France) Clara Burel
- (United Kingdom) Harriet Dart
- (France) Océane Dodin
- (France) Caroline Garcia
- (Czech Republic) Tereza Martincová
- (Russia) Anastasia Potapova
- (Belgium) Alison Van Uytvanck

=== Withdrawals ===
Before the tournament

- (Russia) Ekaterina Alexandrova → replaced by (Czech Republic) Kateřina Siniaková
- (Australia) Ashleigh Barty → replaced by (United States) Danielle Collins
- (Switzerland) Belinda Bencic → replaced by (Switzerland) Jil Teichmann
- (United States) Jennifer Brady → replaced by (Italy) Camila Giorgi
- (United States) Sofia Kenin → replaced by (Latvia) Anastasija Sevastova
- (Germany) Angelique Kerber → replaced by (Australia) Ajla Tomljanović
- (Czech Republic) Barbora Krejčiková → replaced by (Czech Republic) Marie Bouzková
- (Japan) Naomi Osaka → replaced by (France) Fiona Ferro
- (Poland) Iga Świątek → replaced by (Russia) Liudmila Samsonova
- (Czech Republic) Markéta Vondroušová → replaced by (China) Zhang Shuai

During the tournament

- (United Kingdom) Johanna Konta (left knee injury)

=== Retirements ===
- (Czech Republic) Marie Bouzková (dizziness)
- (Czech Republic) Tereza Martincová (abdominal pain)
- (Russia) Anastasia Potapova (left ankle injury)
- (China) Zhang Shuai (left leg injury)

== WTA doubles main-draw entrants ==
=== Seeds ===
Country	Player	Country	Player	Rank^{1}	Seed
BEL	Elise Mertens	BLR	Aryna Sabalenka	8	1
JPN	Shuko Aoyama	JPN	Ena Shibahara	18	2
USA	Nicole Melichar	NED	Demi Schuurs	23	3
CHI	Alexa Guarachi	USA	Desirae Krawczyk	33	4
CAN	Gabriela Dabrowski	BRA	Luisa Stefani	37	5
CRO	Darija Jurak	SLO	Andreja Klepač	48	6
AUS	Ellen Perez	CZE	Květa Peschke	81	7
USA	Coco Gauff	USA	Jessica Pegula	91	8

- Rankings are as of August 2, 2021.

=== Other entrants ===
The following pairs received wildcards into the doubles main draw:

- (Canada) Mélodie Collard / (Canada) Carol Zhao
- (Canada) Leylah Annie Fernandez / (Canada) Rebecca Marino

The following pairs received entry as alternates:

- (United Kingdom) Harriet Dart / (Estonia) Anett Kontaveit
- (France) Océane Dodin / (Russia) Kamilla Rakhimova

=== Withdrawals ===
Before the tournament

- (Czech Republic) Marie Bouzková / (Czech Republic) Lucie Hradecká → replaced by (France) Elixane Lechemia / (United States) Ingrid Neel
- (Chinese Taipei) Chan Hao-ching / (Chinese Taipei) Latisha Chan → replaced by (Germany) Vivian Heisen / (Poland) Alicja Rosolska
- (United States) Kaitlyn Christian / (Japan) Nao Hibino → replaced by (United States) Kaitlyn Christian / (United States) Christina McHale
- (Kazakhstan) Anna Danilina / (Belarus) Lidziya Marozava → replaced by (Norway) Ulrikke Eikeri / (United States) Catherine Harrison
- (Japan) Eri Hozumi / (China) Zhang Shuai → replaced by (France) Océane Dodin / (Russia) Kamilla Rakhimova
- (Japan) Miyu Kato / (United States) Sabrina Santamaria → replaced by (United States) Emina Bektas / (United Kingdom) Tara Moore
- (Czech Republic) Barbora Krejčíková / (Czech Republic) Kateřina Siniaková → replaced by (Indonesia) Beatrice Gumulya / (United Kingdom) Emily Webley-Smith
- (United States) Sofia Kenin / (Latvia) Jeļena Ostapenko → replaced by (Latvia) Jeļena Ostapenko / (Ukraine) Dayana Yastremska
- (Russia) Anastasia Potapova / (Russia) Vera Zvonareva → replaced by (United Kingdom) Harriet Dart / (Estonia) Anett Kontaveit
