= 2014 South Seas Island Resort Women's Pro Classic – Singles =

Singles
- 2014 South Seas Island Resort Women's Pro Classic

Final
- Champion: (Romania) Edina Gallovits-Hall
- Runner-up: (Croatia) Petra Martić
- Score: 6–2, 6–2

Events
Singles	Doubles
← 2013 ·	South Seas Island Resort Women's Pro Classic

Mandy Minella was the defending champion, however she chose not to participate due to a right arm edema.

Edina Gallovits-Hall won the title, defeating Petra Martić in the final, 6–2, 6–2.

== Seeds ==
1. (United States) Grace Min (second round)
2. (Serbia) Jovana Jakšić (first round)
3. (United States) Anna Tatishvili (first round)
4. (Australia) Olivia Rogowska (first round)
5. (Portugal) Michelle Larcher de Brito (first round)
6. (United States) Irina Falconi (second round)
7. (Paraguay) Verónica Cepede Royg (second round)
8. (Colombia) Mariana Duque (second round)

== Main draw ==
=== Key ===
- Q = Qualifier
- WC = Wild card
- LL = Lucky loser
- Alt = Alternate
- SE = Special exempt
- PR = Protected ranking
- ITF = ITF entry
- JE = Junior exempt
- w/o = Walkover
- r = Retired
- d = Defaulted
- SR = Special ranking

=== Finals ===
Semifinals
WC	(Romania) Edina Gallovits-Hall	6^{6}	6	6
SE	(United States) Jennifer Brady	7^{8}	4	4
(Croatia) Petra Martić	6^{2}	6	6
Q	(Germany) Tatjana Maria	7^{7}	2	4

Final
WC	(Romania) Edina Gallovits-Hall	6	6
(Croatia) Petra Martić	2	2

=== Top half ===
First round
1	(United States) G Min	6	6
SE	(United States) M Sanchez	2	3
(United States) L Chirico	7	6
(Chinese Taipei) C-y Hsu	5	1
Q	(Italy) J Paolini	0	2
(United States) J Boserup	6	6
WC	(Romania) E Gallovits-Hall	6	6
5	(Portugal) M Larcher de Brito	4	3
4	(Australia) O Rogowska	3	3
(Canada) G Dabrowski	6	6
(United States) A Muhammad	3	2
(United States) S Crawford	6	6
SE	(United States) J Brady	6	6
(France) M Johansson	1	4
Q	(Japan) M Hibi	4	2
6	(United States) I Falconi	6	6

Second round
1	(United States) G Min	6^{6}	7	5
(United States) L Chirico	7^{8}	5	7
(United States) J Boserup	1	5
WC	(Romania) E Gallovits-Hall	6	7
(Canada) G Dabrowski	6	6
(United States) S Crawford	2	3
SE	(United States) J Brady	6	6
6	(United States) I Falconi	4	4

Quarterfinals
(United States) L Chirico	6	2	4
WC	(Romania) E Gallovits-Hall	4	6	6
(Canada) G Dabrowski	1	5
SE	(United States) J Brady	6	7

Semifinals
WC	(Romania) E Gallovits-Hall	6^{6}	6	6
SE	(United States) J Brady	7^{8}	4	4

=== Bottom half ===
First round
7	(Paraguay) V Cepede Royg	6	6^{3}	7^{8}
WC	(United States) B Pera	1	7^{7}	6^{6}
(Latvia) D Marcinkēviča	3	7	3
LL	(Brazil) B Haddad Maia	6	5	6
Q	(Ukraine) K Bondarenko	3	6	0
(Israel) J Glushko	6	1	6
(Croatia) P Martić	6	4	6
3	(United States) A Tatishvili	3	6	3
8	(Colombia) M Duque	6	6
(United States) S Marand	1	3
(United States) S Vickery	6	4	7
WC	(United States) A-L Jeukeng	1	6	5
Q	(Germany) T Maria	7^{7}	6
WC	(United States) C Bellis	6^{3}	4
(Canada) F Abanda	6	1	6
2	(Serbia) J Jakšić	3	6	2

Second round
7	(Paraguay) V Cepede Royg	3	1
LL	(Brazil) B Haddad Maia	6	6
(Israel) J Glushko	6^{6}	2
(Croatia) P Martić	7^{8}	6
8	(Colombia) M Duque	1	6	6^{3}
(United States) S Vickery	6	4	7^{7}
Q	(Germany) T Maria	6	6
(Canada) F Abanda	2	0

Quarterfinals
LL	(Brazil) B Haddad Maia	6	1	2
(Croatia) P Martić	1	6	6
(United States) S Vickery	1	4
Q	(Germany) T Maria	6	6

Semifinals
(Croatia) P Martić	6^{2}	6	6
Q	(Germany) T Maria	7^{7}	2	4
