= 2013 South Seas Island Resort Women's Pro Classic =

- Date: November 4–10
- Edition: 1st
- Category: ITF Women's Circuit
- Prize money: $50,000
- Surface: Hard
- Location: Captiva Island, United States

Champions

Singles
- (Luxembourg) Mandy Minella

Doubles
- (Canada) Gabriela Dabrowski / (United States) Allie Will
South Seas Island Resort Women's Pro Classic	· 2014 →

The 2013 South Seas Island Resort Women's Pro Classic was a professional tennis tournament played on outdoor hard courts. It was the first edition of the tournament which was part of the 2013 ITF Women's Circuit, offering a total of $50,000 in prize money. It took place in Captiva Island, United States, on November 4–10, 2013.

== Singles entrants ==
=== Seeds ===
Country	Player	Rank^{1}	Seed
POR	Michelle Larcher de Brito	107	1
LUX	Mandy Minella	113	2
USA	Melanie Oudin	117	3
USA	Maria Sanchez	145	4
GEO	Anna Tatishvili	147	5
USA	Julia Cohen	182	6
USA	Victoria Duval	198	7
USA	Jessica Pegula	199	8

- ^{1} Rankings as of October 28, 2013

=== Other entrants ===
The following players received wildcards into the singles main draw:

- (United States) Julia Boserup
- (United States) Ellie Halbauer
- (United States) Nikki Kallenberg

The following players received entry from the qualifying draw:

- (Brazil) Maria Fernanda Alves
- (United States) Jacqueline Cako
- (United States) Lauren Embree
- (United States) Chiara Scholl

The following player received entry by a protected ranking:

- (Norway) Ulrikke Eikeri

== Champions ==
=== Singles ===
- (Luxembourg) Mandy Minella def. (Canada) Gabriela Dabrowski 6–3, 6–3

=== Doubles ===
- (Canada) Gabriela Dabrowski / (United States) Allie Will def. (United States) Julia Boserup / (United States) Alexandra Mueller 6–1, 6–2
