= Ça va bien aller =

An illustration of a rainbow with the words, Ça va bien aller, a slogan used as a symbol of solidarity in Québec, Canada, and other cities and countries

Ça va bien aller is the French translation of the Italian slogan andrà tutto bene, which emerged during the COVID-19 pandemic in Italy, while the country was in lockdown. Italians posted signs with rainbows accompanied by the slogan.

A viral phenomenon, the phrase was used and translated in other countries, though it was used predominantly in Italy, in Quebec and in the French-speaking areas of Ontario and New Brunswick.

== Translations ==
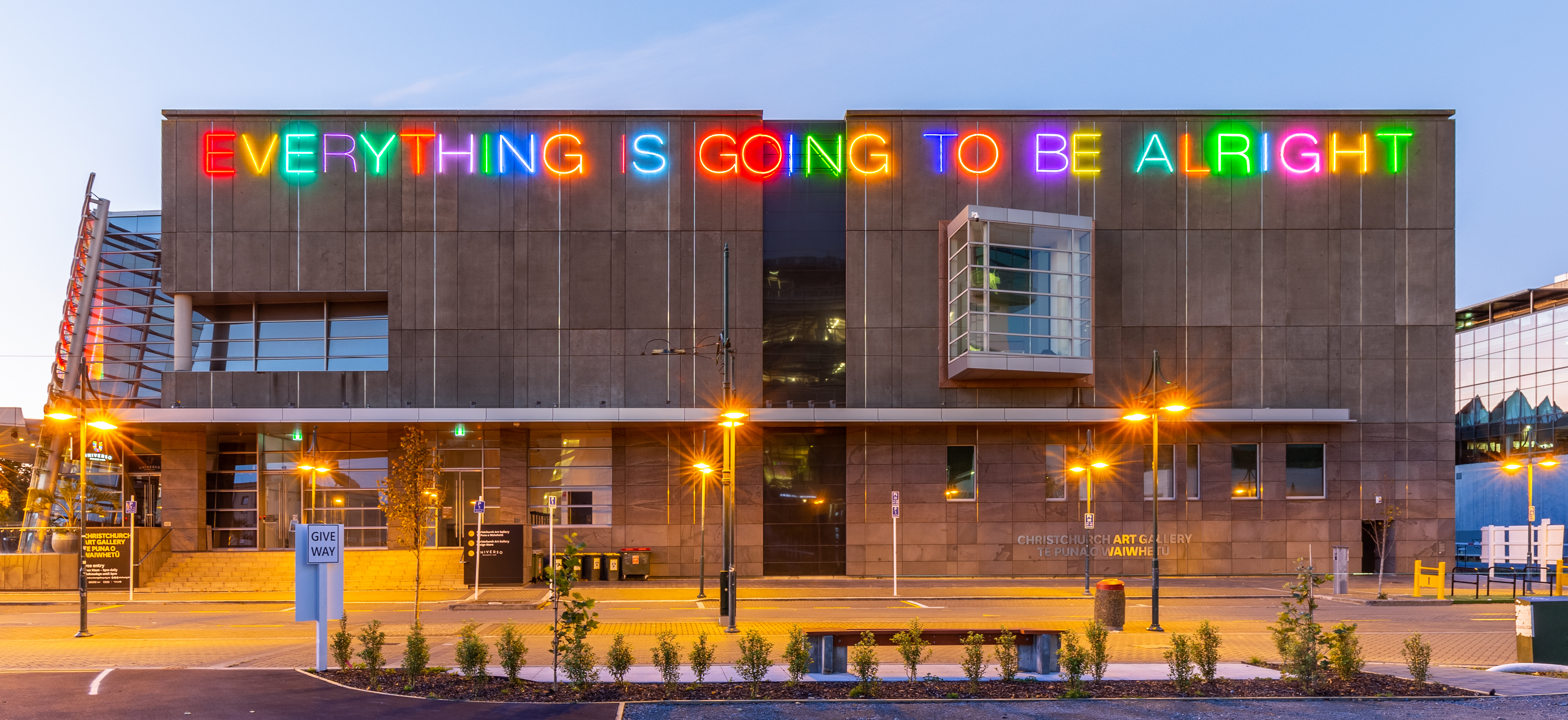
An English rendition of the slogan at Christchurch Art Gallery in New Zealand.

The slogan has several translations:

French

- Ça va bien aller (Québec)
- Tout ira bien
- Tout ira mieux (Belgium)

English

- Everything is going to be alright
- Everything will be alright
- It's going to be okay

== Usage ==
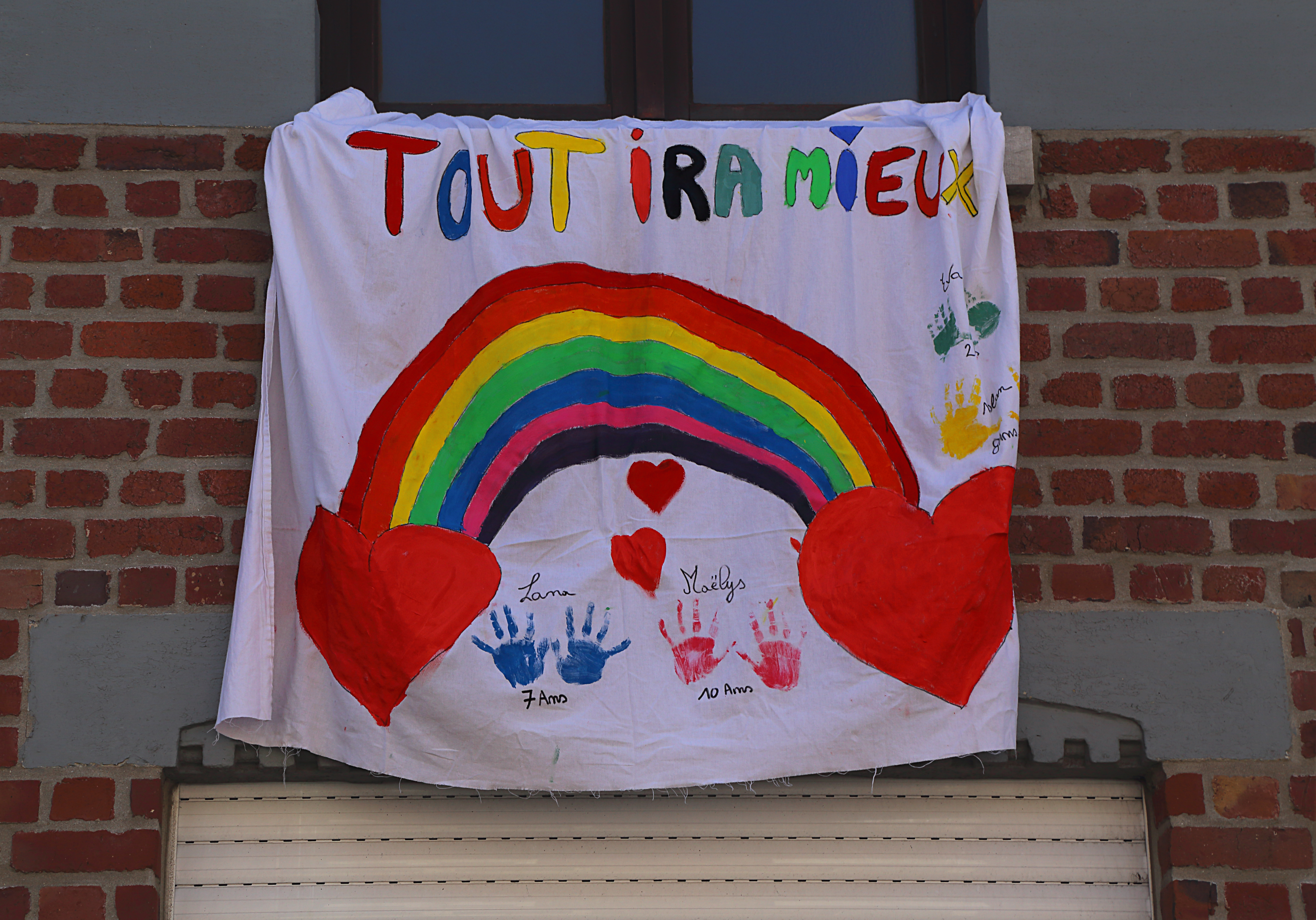
A similar banner with the words, "Tout ira mieux" in Belgium, March 25 2020.

=== Italy ===
The singer Elisa co-wrote the single "Andrà tutto bene" during the original quarantine period applied in Italy early in the pandemic.

=== Quebec ===
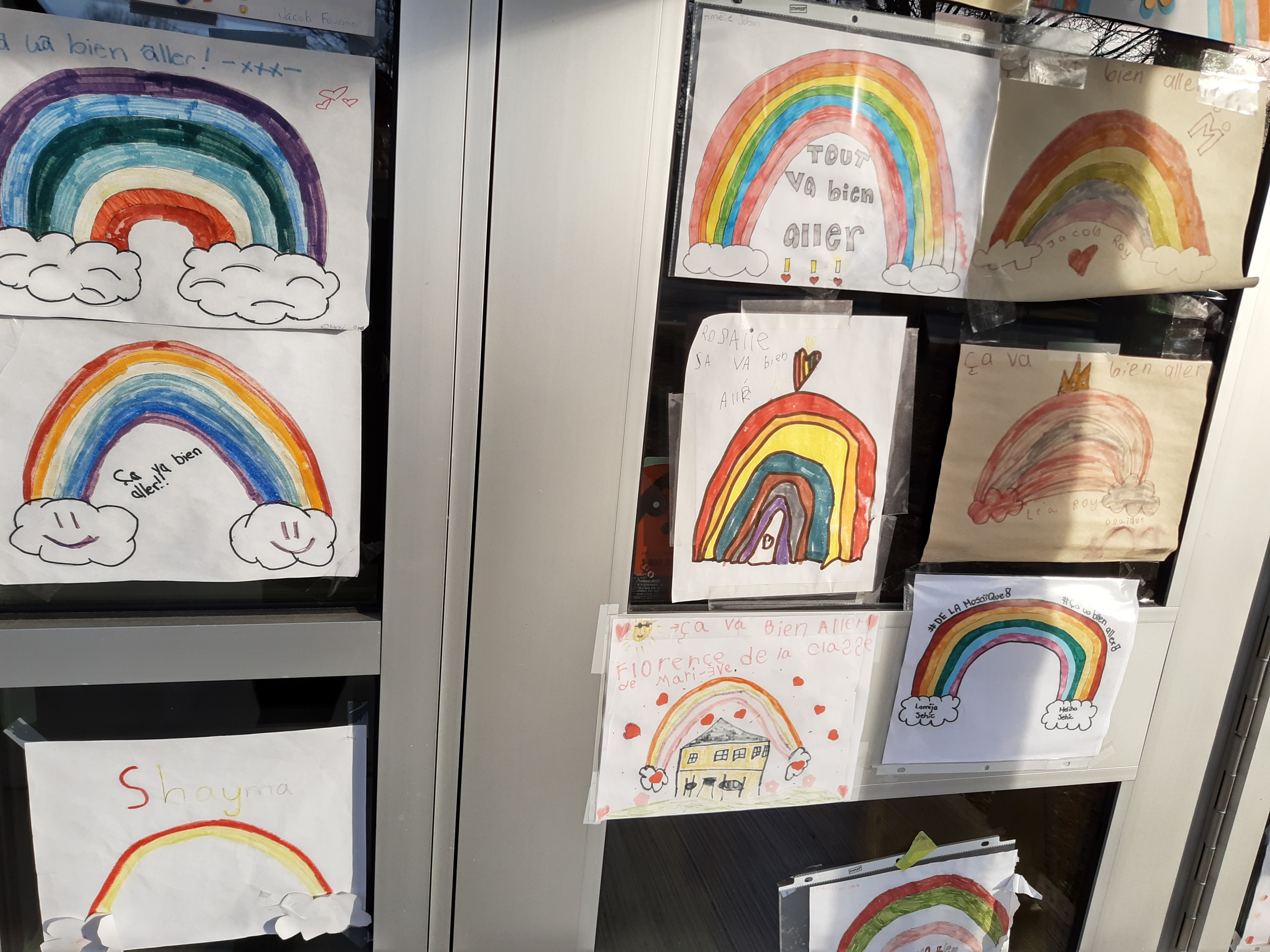
Drawings along the theme of "Ça va bien aller", including posters in doorways and windows of a school in Québec (April 2020).

The slogan was translated in Québec as "ça va bien aller" (in English, similar to "it will be okay", although English translations of the phrase in Québec vary), an expression typically used during more disconcerting events. The phrase was written and circulated alongside images of rainbows with clouds on either end, and typically posted on residential windows. It was also distributed online with the hashtag #cavabienaller.

According to La Presse, Gabriella Cucinelli, a teacher at Centre de la petite enfance, first introduced usage of the phrase in Quebec. On 14 March 2020, she asked students in her class to create rainbows with clouds on either end including the phrase. Cucinelli posted a photo of the drawings on a Facebook group for educators.

According to Radio-Canada, a second teacher in Lanaudière, Karine Laurier, asked her students to create similar drawings, and also posted the results of the project on Facebook.

The phrase has been criticized as being overly positive. Critics argue that the phrase is a way of ignoring the broader issue of COVID-19, generally by dismissing the difficulties of those suffering from the virus, people affected by the COVID-19 recession, and the increased workload for health professionals. It is also considered a way to deflect blame for mishandling of the crisis by the Québec government.
