= 2021 National Bank Open – Women's doubles =

Women's doubles
- 2021 National Bank Open

Final
- Champions: (Canada) Gabriela Dabrowski (Brazil) Luisa Stefani
- Runners-up: (Croatia) Darija Jurak (Slovenia) Andreja Klepač
- Score: 6–3, 6–4

Details
- Draw: 28
- Seeds: 8

Events
| Singles | men | women |
| Doubles | men | women |
- National Bank Open

Barbora Krejčíková and Kateřina Siniaková were the defending champions from when the tournament was last held in 2019, but withdrew before the tournament began.

Gabriela Dabrowski and Luisa Stefani won the title, defeating Darija Jurak and Andreja Klepač in the final, 6–3, 6–4.

== Seeds ==
The top four seeds received a bye into the second round.

1. (Belgium) Elise Mertens / (Belarus) Aryna Sabalenka (quarterfinals)
2. (Japan) Shuko Aoyama / (Japan) Ena Shibahara (second round)
3. (United States) Nicole Melichar / (Netherlands) Demi Schuurs (second round)
4. (Chile) Alexa Guarachi / (United States) Desirae Krawczyk (quarterfinals)
5. (Canada) Gabriela Dabrowski / (Brazil) Luisa Stefani (champions)
6. (Croatia) Darija Jurak / (Slovenia) Andreja Klepač (final)
7. (Australia) Ellen Perez / (Czech Republic) Květa Peschke (quarterfinals)
8. (United States) Coco Gauff / (United States) Jessica Pegula (first round)

== Draw ==
Key

- Q = Qualifier
- WC = Wild card
- LL = Lucky loser
- Alt = Alternate
- ITF = ITF entry
- PR = Protected ranking
- SR = Special ranking
- SE = Special exempt
- JE = Junior exempt
- JR = Junior Accelerator Programme entrant
- CO = College Accelerator Programme entrant
- NG = Next Gen Accelerator Program entrant
- w/o = Walkover
- r = Retired
- d = Defaulted

=== Finals ===
Semifinals
5 | (Canada) Gabriela Dabrowski (Brazil) Luisa Stefani | 6 | 6
(Russia) Veronika Kudermetova (Kazakhstan) Elena Rybakina | 2 | 3
6 | (Croatia) Darija Jurak (Slovenia) Andreja Klepač | 7 | 6
(Poland) Magda Linette (United States) Bernarda Pera | 5 | 4

Final
5 | (Canada) Gabriela Dabrowski (Brazil) Luisa Stefani | 6 | 6
6 | (Croatia) Darija Jurak (Slovenia) Andreja Klepač | 3 | 4

=== Top half ===
First round
WC | (Canada) LA Fernandez (Canada) R Marino | 5 | 6 | [10]
(France) E Lechemia (United States) I Neel | 7 | 3 | [2]
(United States) E Bektas (United Kingdom) T Moore | 6 | 5 | [10]
(Slovenia) P Hercog (Belgium) A Van Uytvanck | 3 | 7 | [7]
(Germany) J Lohoff (Czech Republic) R Voráčová | 4 | 6 | [4]
5 | (Canada) G Dabrowski (Brazil) L Stefani | 6 | 4 | [10]
(Norway) U Eikeri (United States) C Harrison | 7 | 6
(United States) K Christian (United States) C McHale | 5 | 4
Alt | (United Kingdom) H Dart (Estonia) A Kontaveit | 2 | 2
(Czech Republic) K Muchová (Czech Republic) Ka Plíšková | 6 | 6
(Russia) V Kudermetova (Kazakhstan) E Rybakina | 6 | 6
8 | (United States) C Gauff (United States) J Pegula | 2 | 4

Second round
1 | (Belgium) E Mertens (Belarus) A Sabalenka | 7^{7} | 6
WC | (Canada) LA Fernandez (Canada) R Marino | 6^{4} | 2
(United States) E Bektas (United Kingdom) T Moore | 5 | 2
5 | (Canada) G Dabrowski (Brazil) L Stefani | 7 | 6
3 | (United States) N Melichar (Netherlands) D Schuurs | 3 | 6 | [4]
(Norway) U Eikeri (United States) C Harrison | 6 | 2 | [10]
(Czech Republic) K Muchová (Czech Republic) Ka Plíšková | 2 | 4
(Russia) V Kudermetova (Kazakhstan) E Rybakina | 6 | 6

Quarterfinals
1 | (Belgium) E Mertens (Belarus) A Sabalenka | 2 | 2
5 | (Canada) G Dabrowski (Brazil) L Stefani | 6 | 6
(Norway) U Eikeri (United States) C Harrison | 0 | 2
(Russia) V Kudermetova (Kazakhstan) E Rybakina | 6 | 6

Semifinals
5 | (Canada) G Dabrowski (Brazil) L Stefani | 6 | 6
(Russia) V Kudermetova (Kazakhstan) E Rybakina | 2 | 3

=== Bottom half ===
First round
6 | (Croatia) D Jurak (Slovenia) A Klepač | 7 | 6
(Spain) P Badosa (Spain) S Sorribes Tormo | 5 | 2
(New Zealand) E Routliffe (Netherlands) R van der Hoek | 6^{5} | 6^{6}
(Germany) V Heisen (Poland) A Rosolska | 7^{7} | 7^{8}
(Indonesia) B Gumulya (United Kingdom) E Webley-Smith | 2 | 3
WC | (Canada) M Collard (Canada) C Zhao | 6 | 6
7 | (Australia) E Perez (Czech Republic) K Peschke | 6 | 7^{7}
(Ukraine) L Kichenok (Japan) M Ninomiya | 2 | 6^{3}
(Latvia) J Ostapenko (Ukraine) D Yastremska | 4 | 6 | [12]
Alt | (France) O Dodin (Russia) K Rakhimova | 6 | 4 | [10]
(Poland) M Linette (United States) B Pera | 6 | 6
(Georgia (country)) O Kalashnikova (United Kingdom) H Watson | 0 | 0

Second round
6 | (Croatia) D Jurak (Slovenia) A Klepač | 6 | 7^{7}
(Germany) V Heisen (Poland) A Rosolska | 0 | 6^{4}
WC | (Canada) M Collard (Canada) C Zhao | 3 | 4
4 | (Chile) A Guarachi (United States) D Krawczyk | 6 | 6
7 | (Australia) E Perez (Czech Republic) K Peschke | 6 | 6
(Latvia) J Ostapenko (Ukraine) D Yastremska | 2 | 4
(Poland) M Linette (United States) B Pera | 6 | 7^{7}
2 | (Japan) S Aoyama (Japan) E Shibahara | 4 | 6^{3}

Quarterfinals
6 | (Croatia) D Jurak (Slovenia) A Klepač | 6 | 6
4 | (Chile) A Guarachi (United States) D Krawczyk | 4 | 2
7 | (Australia) E Perez (Czech Republic) K Peschke | 6 | 2 | [11]
(Poland) M Linette (United States) B Pera | 1 | 6 | [13]

Semifinals
6 | (Croatia) D Jurak (Slovenia) A Klepač | 7 | 6
(Poland) M Linette (United States) B Pera | 5 | 4
