= 2013 South Seas Island Resort Women's Pro Classic – Singles =

Singles
- 2013 South Seas Island Resort Women's Pro Classic

Final
- Champion: (Luxembourg) Mandy Minella
- Runner-up: (Canada) Gabriela Dabrowski
- Score: 6–3, 6–3

Events
Singles	Doubles
South Seas Island Resort Women's Pro Classic	· 2014 →

This was a new event in 2013.

Mandy Minella won the tournament, defeating Gabriela Dabrowski in the final, 6–3, 6–3.

== Seeds ==
1. (Portugal) Michelle Larcher de Brito (first round)
2. (Luxembourg) Mandy Minella (champion)
3. (United States) Melanie Oudin (first round)
4. (United States) Maria Sanchez (second round)
5. (Georgia (country)) Anna Tatishvili (first round)
6. (United States) Julia Cohen (semifinals)
7. (United States) Victoria Duval (second round)
8. (United States) Jessica Pegula (quarterfinals; retired)

== Main draw ==
=== Key ===
- Q = Qualifier
- WC = Wild card
- LL = Lucky loser
- Alt = Alternate
- ITF = ITF entry
- PR = Protected ranking
- SR = Special ranking
- SE = Special exempt
- JE = Junior exempt
- JR = Junior Accelerator Programme entrant
- CO = College Accelerator Programme entrant
- NG = Next Gen Accelerator Program entrant
- w/o = Walkover
- r = Retired
- d = Defaulted

=== Finals ===
Semifinals
6	(United States) Julia Cohen	6	6^{2}	4
(Canada) Gabriela Dabrowski	1	7^{7}	6
(United States) Allie Kiick	0	0
2	(Luxembourg) Mandy Minella	6	6

Final
(Canada) Gabriela Dabrowski	3	3
2	(Luxembourg) Mandy Minella	6	6

=== Top half ===
First round
1	(Portugal) M Larcher de Brito	4	6	4
(United States) S Marand	6	4	6
(United States) S Crawford	4	3
(United States) N Gibbs	6	6
Q	(Brazil) MF Alves	6	3	3
(Canada) H El Tabakh	2	6	6
(Colombia) C Castaño	6	4	5
6	(United States) J Cohen	1	6	7
4	(United States) M Sanchez	6	2	6
(Slovenia) P Rampre	3	6	2
(Canada) G Dabrowski	6	6
(Mexico) M Zacarías	2	1
(Venezuela) A Pérez	7	6
WC	(United States) E Halbauer	5	3
(United States) T Townsend	2	2
8	(United States) J Pegula	6	6

Second round
(United States) S Marand	1	3
(United States) N Gibbs	6	6
(Canada) H El Tabakh	2	4
6	(United States) J Cohen	6	6
4	(United States) M Sanchez	5	2
(Canada) G Dabrowski	7	6
(Venezuela) A Pérez	6	3	3
8	(United States) J Pegula	2	6	6

Quarterfinals
(United States) N Gibbs	2	1
6	(United States) J Cohen	6	6
(Canada) G Dabrowski	6	3
8	(United States) J Pegula	3	0^{r}

Semifinals
6	(United States) J Cohen	6	6^{2}	4
(Canada) G Dabrowski	1	7^{7}	6

=== Bottom half ===
First round
7	(United States) V Duval	6	3
Q	(United States) J Cako	1	1^{r}
(Bulgaria) E Kostova	6	7^{9}
(Poland) M Domachowska	1	6^{7}
WC	(United States) N Kallenberg	0	1
PR	(Norway) U Eikeri	6	6
(United States) A Kiick	3	6	6
3	(United States) M Oudin	6	3	0
5	(Georgia (country)) A Tatishvili	6^{5}	0^{r}
WC	(United States) J Boserup	7^{7}	3
Q	(United States) C Scholl	6^{2}	6	7
Q	(United States) L Embree	7^{7}	3	5
(United States) A Will	7^{7}	6
(United States) A Mueller	6^{5}	3
(United States) C-Y Hsu	4	1
2	(Luxembourg) M Minella	6	6

Second round
7	(United States) V Duval	3	6^{5}
(Bulgaria) E Kostova	6	7^{7}
PR	(Norway) U Eikeri	6	3	5
(United States) A Kiick	3	6	7
WC	(United States) J Boserup	6	6
Q	(United States) C Scholl	1	2
(United States) A Will	2	2
2	(Luxembourg) M Minella	6	6

Quarterfinals
(Bulgaria) E Kostova	5	0^{r}
(United States) A Kiick	7	4
WC	(United States) J Boserup	7^{7}	1	2
2	(Luxembourg) M Minella	6^{1}	6	6

Semifinals
(United States) A Kiick	0	0
2	(Luxembourg) M Minella	6	6
