= 2021 National Bank Open – Women's singles =

Women's singles
- 2021 National Bank Open

Final
- Champion: (Italy) Camila Giorgi
- Runner-up: (Czech Republic) Karolína Plíšková
- Score: 6–3, 7–5

Details
- Draw: 56 (8 Q / 5 WC )
- Seeds: 16

Events
Singles	men	women
Doubles	men	women
← 2019 ·	National Bank Open	· 2022 →

Camila Giorgi defeated Karolína Plíšková in the final, 6–3, 7–5 to win the women's singles tennis title at the 2021 Canadian Open. It was her third career WTA Tour title, her first at the WTA 1000 level, and her first since Linz in 2018.

Bianca Andreescu was the defending champion from when the event was last held in 2019, but lost in the third round to Ons Jabeur.

== Seeds ==
The top eight seeds received a bye into the second round.

1. (Belarus) Aryna Sabalenka (semifinals)
2. (Canada) Bianca Andreescu (third round)
3. (Ukraine) Elina Svitolina (second round)
4. (Czech Republic) Karolína Plíšková (final)
5. (Spain) Garbiñe Muguruza (second round)
6. (Romania) Simona Halep (second round)
7. (Czech Republic) Petra Kvitová (third round)
8. (Belarus) Victoria Azarenka (quarterfinals)

9. (Belgium) Elise Mertens (first round)
10. (Russia) Anastasia Pavlyuchenkova (second round)
11. (Greece) Maria Sakkari (third round)
12. (Kazakhstan) Elena Rybakina (first round)
13. (Tunisia) Ons Jabeur (quarterfinals)
14. (Czech Republic) Karolína Muchová (first round)
15. (United States) Coco Gauff (quarterfinals)
16. (United States) Madison Keys (first round)

Click on the seed number of a player to go to their draw section.

== Draw ==
=== Key ===
- Q = Qualifier
- WC = Wild card
- LL = Lucky loser
- Alt = Alternate
- ITF = ITF entry
- PR = Protected ranking
- SR = Special ranking
- SE = Special exempt
- JE = Junior exempt
- JR = Junior Accelerator Programme entrant
- CO = College Accelerator Programme entrant
- NG = Next Gen Accelerator Program entrant
- w/o = Walkover
- r = Retired
- d = Defaulted

=== Finals ===
Quarterfinals
1	(Belarus) Aryna Sabalenka	6	6
8	(Belarus) Victoria Azarenka	2	4
4	(Czech Republic) Karolína Plíšková	6	6
(Spain) Sara Sorribes Tormo	4	0
(Italy) Camila Giorgi	6	7^{7}
15	(United States) Coco Gauff	4	6^{2}
(United States) Jessica Pegula	1	7^{7}	6
13	(Tunisia) Ons Jabeur	6	6^{4}	0

Semifinals
1	(Belarus) Aryna Sabalenka	3	4
4	(Czech Republic) Karolína Plíšková	6	6
(Italy) Camila Giorgi	6	3	6
(United States) Jessica Pegula	3	6	1

Final
4	(Czech Republic) Karolína Plíšková	3	5
(Italy) Camila Giorgi	6	7

=== Top half ===
==== Section 1 ====
First round
(Ukraine) D Yastremska	4	6	4
WC	(United States) S Stephens	6	1	6
(Spain) P Badosa	6	6
(Switzerland) V Golubic	2	3
WC	(Canada) R Marino	6	6
16	(United States) M Keys	3	3
11	(Greece) M Sakkari	6	3
(Czech Republic) M Bouzková	4	1^{r}
(Russia) V Kudermetova	1	6	6
(Kazakhstan) Y Putintseva	6	2	4
(United States) A Riske	3	4
(Romania) S Cîrstea	6	6

Second round
1	(Belarus) A Sabalenka	7^{7}	4	6
WC	(United States) S Stephens	6^{4}	6	4
(Spain) P Badosa	6	5	4
WC	(Canada) R Marino	1	7	6
11	(Greece) M Sakkari	6	5	6
(Russia) V Kudermetova	4	7	4
(Romania) S Cîrstea	2	2
8	(Belarus) V Azarenka	6	6

Third round
1	(Belarus) A Sabalenka	6	6
WC	(Canada) R Marino	1	3
11	(Greece) M Sakkari	4	6	6^{2}
8	(Belarus) V Azarenka	6	3	7^{7}

Quarterfinals
1	(Belarus) A Sabalenka	6	6
8	(Belarus) V Azarenka	2	4

==== Section 2 ====
First round
Q	(Belgium) A Van Uytvanck	1	2
(Croatia) D Vekić	6	6
Q	(Czech Republic) T Martincová	1	3^{r}
Q	(United States) A Anisimova	6	4
Q	(France) O Dodin	6	1	6
14	(Czech Republic) K Muchová	3	6	2
12	(Kazakhstan) E Rybakina	4	7	4
(Russia) L Samsonova	6	5	6
WC	(Canada) C Zhao	2	3
(Spain) S Sorribes Tormo	6	6
(Latvia) J Ostapenko	1	3
(Czech Republic) K Siniaková	6	6

Second round
4	(Czech Republic) Ka Plíšková	4	6	7^{7}
(Croatia) D Vekić	6	3	6^{2}
Q	(United States) A Anisimova	6	6
Q	(France) O Dodin	3	3
(Russia) L Samsonova	4	3
(Spain) S Sorribes Tormo	6	6
(Czech Republic) K Siniaková	6	0	6
5	(Spain) G Muguruza	2	6	3

Third round
4	(Czech Republic) Ka Plíšková	6	7^{10}
Q	(United States) A Anisimova	1	6^{8}
(Spain) S Sorribes Tormo	6^{4}	6	6
(Czech Republic) K Siniaková	7^{7}	0	3

Quarterfinals
4	(Czech Republic) Ka Plíšková	6	6
(Spain) S Sorribes Tormo	4	0

=== Bottom half ===
==== Section 3 ====
First round
(Australia) A Tomljanović	6	2	0^{r}
(France) F Ferro	2	6	0
(Poland) M Linette	1	2
(Argentina) N Podoroska	6	6
(Italy) C Giorgi	6	7
9	(Belgium) E Mertens	3	5
15	(United States) C Gauff	6	6
(Latvia) A Sevastova	1	4
Q	(Russia) A Potapova	7^{8}	6
(United States) S Rogers	6^{6}	3
(China) S Zhang	6	2^{r}
(United Kingdom) J Konta	4	5

Second round
7	(Czech Republic) P Kvitová	6	6
(France) F Ferro	4	4
(Argentina) N Podoroska	2	4
(Italy) C Giorgi	6	6
15	(United States) C Gauff	5
Q	(Russia) A Potapova	0^{r}
(United Kingdom) J Konta	3	6	6
3	(Ukraine) E Svitolina	6	3	2

Third round
7	(Czech Republic) P Kvitová	4	4
(Italy) C Giorgi	6	6
15	(United States) C Gauff	w/o
(United Kingdom) J Konta

Quarterfinals
(Italy) C Giorgi	6	7^{7}
15	(United States) C Gauff	4	6^{2}

==== Section 4 ====
First round
(United States) D Collins	4	6	6
(Switzerland) J Teichmann	6	1	3
(Estonia) A Kontaveit	7	3	3
(United States) J Pegula	5	6	6
Q	(France) C Garcia	4	4
10	(Russia) A Pavlyuchenkova	6	6
13	(Tunisia) O Jabeur	6	6
Q	(France) C Burel	1	3
(Croatia) P Martić	5	3
(Russia) D Kasatkina	7	6
Q	(United Kingdom) H Dart	7	7^{7}
WC	(Canada) LA Fernandez	5	6^{4}

Second round
6/WC	(Romania) S Halep	6	4	4
(United States) D Collins	2	6	6
(United States) J Pegula	1	6	6
10	(Russia) A Pavlyuchenkova	6	3	2
13	(Tunisia) O Jabeur	2	6	6
(Russia) D Kasatkina	6	3	4
Q	(United Kingdom) H Dart	1	6	3
2	(Canada) B Andreescu	6	3	6

Third round
(United States) D Collins	4	6	5
(United States) J Pegula	6	3	7
13	(Tunisia) O Jabeur	6^{5}	6	6
2	(Canada) B Andreescu	7^{7}	4	1

Quarterfinals
(United States) J Pegula	1	7^{7}	6
13	(Tunisia) O Jabeur	6	6^{4}	0

== Qualifying ==
=== Seeds ===
1. (Belgium) Alison Van Uytvanck (qualified)
2. (France) Kristina Mladenovic (qualifying competition)
3. (Czech Republic) Tereza Martincová (qualified)
4. (United Kingdom) Heather Watson (qualifying competition)
5. (United States) Ann Li (qualifying competition)
6. (France) Caroline Garcia (qualified)
7. (United States) Amanda Anisimova (qualified)
8. (United States) Bernarda Pera (first round)
9. (Slovenia) Polona Hercog (qualifying competition)
10. (Russia) Anastasia Potapova (qualified)
11. (France) Clara Burel (qualified)
12. (United States) Christina McHale (qualifying competition)
13. (France) Océane Dodin (qualified)
14. (Australia) Astra Sharma (first round)
15. (United States) Kristie Ahn (qualifying competition)
16. (Russia) Kamilla Rakhimova (qualifying competition)

=== Qualifiers ===
1. (Belgium) Alison Van Uytvanck
2. (Russia) Anastasia Potapova
3. (Czech Republic) Tereza Martincová
4. (France) Clara Burel
5. (France) Océane Dodin
6. (France) Caroline Garcia
7. (United States) Amanda Anisimova
8. (United Kingdom) Harriet Dart

==== First qualifier ====
First round
1	(Belgium) Alison Van Uytvanck	6	6
(Japan) Makoto Ninomiya	2	0
(Germany) Jule Niemeier	6	6
14	(Australia) Astra Sharma	4	2

Qualifying competition
1	(Belgium) Alison Van Uytvanck	6^{4}	6	6
(Germany) Jule Niemeier	7^{7}	0	3

==== Second qualifier ====
First round
2	(France) Kristina Mladenovic	6	7^{7}
(Ukraine) Lyudmyla Kichenok	4	6^{2}
WC	(Canada) Layne Sleeth	6	4	3
10	(Russia) Anastasia Potapova	4	6	6

Qualifying competition
2	(France) Kristina Mladenovic	6^{5}	2
10	(Russia) Anastasia Potapova	7^{7}	6

==== Third qualifier ====
First round
3	(Czech Republic) Tereza Martincová	6	6
(Netherlands) Demi Schuurs	3	1
(France) Harmony Tan	2	3
9	(Slovenia) Polona Hercog	6	6

Qualifying competition
3	(Czech Republic) Tereza Martincová	7	6
9	(Slovenia) Polona Hercog	5	3

==== Fourth qualifier ====
First round
4	(United Kingdom) Heather Watson	6	6
(Canada) Katherine Sebov	0	3
(United Kingdom) Emily Webley-Smith	6^{3}	4
11	(France) Clara Burel	7^{7}	6

Qualifying competition
4	(United Kingdom) Heather Watson	6	4	4
11	(France) Clara Burel	1	6	6

==== Fifth qualifier ====
First round
5	(United States) Ann Li	6	6
WC	(Canada) Mia Kupres	1	3
WC	(Canada) Kayla Cross	0	2
13	(France) Océane Dodin	6	6

Qualifying competition
5	(United States) Ann Li	1	4
13	(France) Océane Dodin	6	6

==== Sixth qualifier ====
First round
6	(France) Caroline Garcia	7^{7}	6
(Canada) Françoise Abanda	6^{5}	4
(United States) Nicole Melichar	6	5	0
15	(United States) Kristie Ahn	1	7	6

Qualifying competition
6	(France) Caroline Garcia	7^{7}	6
15	(United States) Kristie Ahn	6^{3}	3

==== Seventh qualifier ====
First round
7	(United States) Amanda Anisimova	6	1	6
(Australia) Maddison Inglis	3	6	0
WC	(Canada) Mélodie Collard	3	0
16	(Russia) Kamilla Rakhimova	6	6

Qualifying competition
7	(United States) Amanda Anisimova	7^{7}	6
16	(Russia) Kamilla Rakhimova	6^{3}	4

==== Eighth qualifier ====
First round
8	(United States) Bernarda Pera	6	4	3
(United Kingdom) Harriet Dart	3	6	6
(Canada) Raphaëlle Lacasse	0	1
11	(United States) Christina McHale	6	6

Qualifying competition
(United Kingdom) Harriet Dart	2	6	6
11	(United States) Christina McHale	6	2	4
