= 2014 South Seas Island Resort Women's Pro Classic – Doubles =

Doubles
- 2014 South Seas Island Resort Women's Pro Classic

Final
- Champions: (Canada) Gabriela Dabrowski (United States) Anna Tatishvili
- Runners-up: (United States) Asia Muhammad (United States) Maria Sanchez
- Score: 6–3, 6–3

Events
Singles	Doubles
← 2013 ·	South Seas Island Resort Women's Pro Classic

Gabriela Dabrowski and Allie Will were the defending champions, however Will chose not to participate. Dabrowski partnered Anna Tatishvili and successfully defended her title, they defeated Asia Muhammad and Maria Sanchez in the final, 6–3, 6–3.

== Seeds ==
1. (Canada) Gabriela Dabrowski / (United States) Anna Tatishvili (champions)
2. (United States) Asia Muhammad / (United States) Maria Sanchez (final)
3. (United States) Irina Falconi / (Croatia) Petra Martić (semifinals)
4. (Ukraine) Kateryna Bondarenko / (Latvia) Diāna Marcinkēviča (semifinals)

== Draw ==
=== Key ===
- Q = Qualifier
- WC = Wild card
- LL = Lucky loser
- Alt = Alternate
- SE = Special exempt
- PR = Protected ranking
- ITF = ITF entry
- JE = Junior exempt
- w/o = Walkover
- r = Retired
- d = Defaulted
- SR = Special ranking

First round
1	(Canada) G Dabrowski (United States) A Tatishvili	6	6
(United States) J Brady (United States) B Pera	0	4
(Canada) F Abanda (Canada) C Zhao	6^{7}	5
(France) M Johansson (Germany) T Maria	7^{9}	7
4	(Ukraine) K Bondarenko (Latvia) D Marcinkēviča	6	6
WC	(United States) A-L Jeukeng (United States) SC Parker	2	1
(Brazil) MF Alves (Chinese Taipei) C-y Hsu	6	6
(Israel) J Glushko (Serbia) J Jakšić	2	0
(United States) S Crawford (United States) S Vickery	2	6	[10]
Alt	(Brazil) B Haddad Maia (Mexico) R Zarazúa	6	1	[5]
(United States) C Bellis (Greece) D Papamichail	2	4
3	(United States) I Falconi (Croatia) P Martić	6	6
(United States) L Chirico (United States) S Marand	6	6
(United States) D Mills (United States) T Sadler	0	2
(United States) E Clark (United States) K Stewart	1	6^{3}
2	(United States) A Muhammad (United States) M Sanchez	6	7^{7}

Quarterfinals
1	(Canada) G Dabrowski (United States) A Tatishvili	6	6
(France) M Johansson (Germany) T Maria	3	3
4	(Ukraine) K Bondarenko (Latvia) D Marcinkēviča	7	7^{7}
(Brazil) MF Alves (Chinese Taipei) C-y Hsu	5	6^{5}
(United States) S Crawford (United States) S Vickery	6^{3}	4
3	(United States) I Falconi (Croatia) P Martić	7^{7}	6
(United States) L Chirico (United States) S Marand	3	1
2	(United States) A Muhammad (United States) M Sanchez	6	6

Semifinals
1	(Canada) G Dabrowski (United States) A Tatishvili	1	6	[10]
4	(Ukraine) K Bondarenko (Latvia) D Marcinkēviča	6	2	[6]
3	(United States) I Falconi (Croatia) P Martić	5	6	[7]
2	(United States) A Muhammad (United States) M Sanchez	7	4	[10]

Final
1	(Canada) G Dabrowski (United States) A Tatishvili	6	6
2	(United States) A Muhammad (United States) M Sanchez	3	3
