= 2013 South Seas Island Resort Women's Pro Classic – Doubles =

Doubles
- 2013 South Seas Island Resort Women's Pro Classic

Final
- Champions: (Canada) Gabriela Dabrowski (United States) Allie Will
- Runners-up: (United States) Julia Boserup (United States) Alexandra Mueller
- Score: 6–1, 6–2

Events
Singles	Doubles
South Seas Island Resort Women's Pro Classic	· 2014 →

This was a new event in 2013.

Gabriela Dabrowski and Allie Will won the title with a 6–1, 6–2 win over Julia Boserup and Alexandra Mueller.

== Seeds ==
1. (Canada) Gabriela Dabrowski / (United States) Allie Will (champions)
2. (Brazil) Maria Fernanda Alves / (Colombia) Catalina Castaño (first round)
3. (United States) Julia Cohen / (Poland) Marta Domachowska (first round)
4. (United States) Emily Harman / (United States) Jessica Pegula (quarterfinals)

== Draw ==
=== Key ===
- Q = Qualifier
- WC = Wild card
- LL = Lucky loser
- Alt = Alternate
- SE = Special exempt
- PR = Protected ranking
- ITF = ITF entry
- JE = Junior exempt
- w/o = Walkover
- r = Retired
- d = Defaulted
- SR = Special ranking

First round
1	(Canada) G Dabrowski (United States) A Will	6	6
(United States) L Embree (United States) N Kallenberg	3	3
(United States) N Gibbs (United States) C-Y Hsu	6	5	[7]
(South Africa) M Sammons (United States) C Scholl	4	7	[10]
4	(United States) E Harman (United States) J Pegula	7^{7}	6
(United States) A-L Jeukeng (United States) J Lawrence	6^{5}	2
(United States) S Crawford (United States) M Sanchez	6	6
(United States) N Pluskota (United States) C Whoriskey	3	4
(United States) J Boserup (United States) A Mueller	6	6
(United States) J Abaza (United States) J Cako	3	0
(Venezuela) A Pérez (Mexico) M Zacarías	6	6
3	(United States) J Cohen (Poland) M Domachowska	3	3
(Norway) U Eikeri (Bulgaria) E Kostova	6	6
WC	(United States) A Guillette (United States) K Kendrick	0	0
(Canada) H El Tabakh (United States) A Kiick	7^{7}	3	[10]
2	(Brazil) MF Alves (Colombia) C Castaño	6^{5}	6	[7]

Quarterfinals
1	(Canada) G Dabrowski (United States) A Will	6	6
(South Africa) M Sammons (United States) C Scholl	3	0
4	(United States) E Harman (United States) J Pegula	6^{3}	4
(United States) S Crawford (United States) M Sanchez	7^{7}	6
(United States) J Boserup (United States) A Mueller	6	6
(Venezuela) A Pérez (Mexico) M Zacarías	2	2
(Norway) U Eikeri (Bulgaria) E Kostova	6	0	[12]
(Canada) H El Tabakh (United States) A Kiick	3	6	[10]

Semifinals
1	(Canada) G Dabrowski (United States) A Will	7^{7}	7
(United States) S Crawford (United States) M Sanchez	6^{3}	5
(United States) J Boserup (United States) A Mueller	7^{7}	6
(Norway) U Eikeri (Bulgaria) E Kostova	6^{4}	1

Final
1	(Canada) G Dabrowski (United States) A Will	6	6
(United States) J Boserup (United States) A Mueller	1	2
