= South Seas Island Resort Women's Pro Classic =

ITF Women's Tour
- Event name: Captiva Island
- Location: Captiva Island, United States
- Venue: South Seas Island Resort
- Category: ITF Women's Circuit
- Surface: Hard
- Draw: 32S/32Q/16D
- Prize money: $50,000
- Website: Official website

The South Seas Island Resort Women's Pro Classic was a tournament for professional female tennis players played on outdoor hard courts. The event was classified as a $50,000 ITF Women's Circuit tournament and was held in Captiva Island, United States, in 2013 and 2014.

== Past finals ==
=== Singles ===
Year	Champion	Runner-up	Score
2014	(Romania) Edina Gallovits-Hall	(Croatia) Petra Martić	6–2, 6–2
2013	(Luxembourg) Mandy Minella	(Canada) Gabriela Dabrowski	6–3, 6–3

=== Doubles ===
Year	Champions	Runners-up	Score
2014	(Canada) Gabriela Dabrowski (United States) Anna Tatishvili	(United States) Asia Muhammad (United States) Maria Sanchez	6–3, 6–3
2013	(Canada) Gabriela Dabrowski (United States) Allie Will	(United States) Julia Boserup (United States) Alexandra Mueller	6–1, 6–2
