= Gabriela Dabrowski =

Canadian tennis player (born 1992)

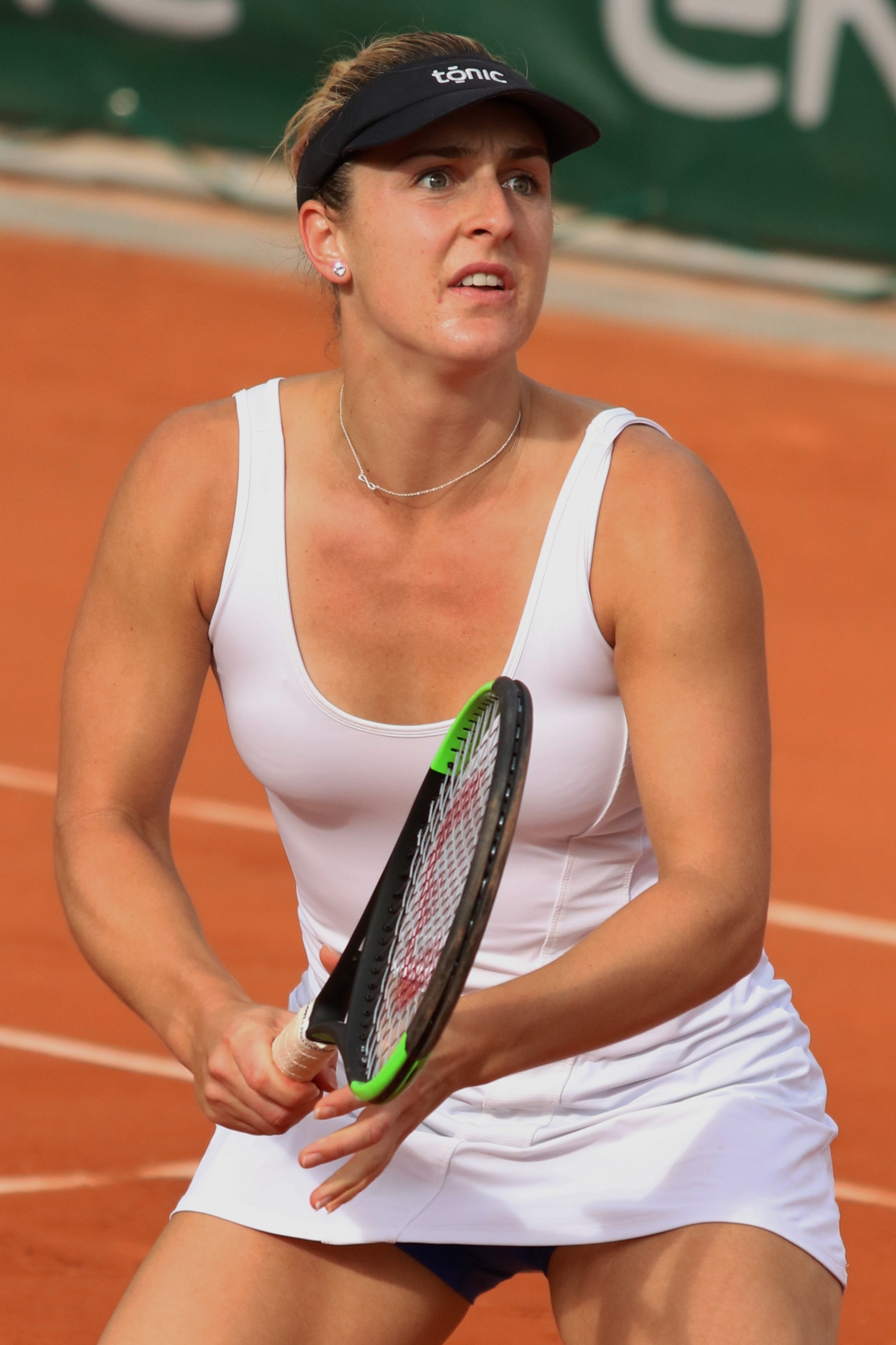
- Dabrowski at the 2019 French Open
- Country (sports): Canada
- Residence: Ottawa, Ontario, Canada
- Born: April 1, 1992 (age 34) Ottawa, Ontario, Canada
- Height: 1.78 m (5 ft 10 in)
- Turned pro: 2011
- Plays: Right (two-handed backhand)
- Prize money: US$ 8,018,963

Singles
- Career record: 199–212
- Career titles: 0
- Highest ranking: No. 164 (3 November 2014)

Grand Slam singles results
- Australian Open: Q1 (2015)
- French Open: Q2 (2014, 2015)
- Wimbledon: Q1 (2015)
- US Open: Q1 (2013, 2014, 2015)

Doubles
- Career record: 545–337
- Career titles: 26
- Highest ranking: No. 2 (23 February 2026)
- Current ranking: No. 3 (16 November 2026)

Grand Slam doubles results
- Australian Open: SF (2024, 2025, 2026)
- French Open: SF (2026)
- Wimbledon: F (2019, 2024, 2026)
- US Open: W (2023, 2025)

Other doubles tournaments
- Tour Finals: W (2024)
- Olympic Games: 2R (2016, 2024)

Mixed doubles
- Career titles: 2

Grand Slam mixed doubles results
- Australian Open: W (2018)
- French Open: W (2017)
- Wimbledon: QF (2017, 2021, 2022)
- US Open: QF (2016, 2017, 2019)

Team competitions
- BJK Cup: W (2023), record 15–12
Medal record
Women's tennis
Representing Canada
Olympic Games
| Bronze medal – third place | 2024 Paris | Mixed doubles |
Pan American Games
| Gold medal – first place | 2015 Toronto | Doubles |
| Silver medal – second place | 2015 Toronto | Mixed doubles |
- Last updated on: 19 November 2026.

Gabriela "Gaby" Dabrowski (/dəˈbraʊski/; Polish: Dąbrowska, pronounced [dɔmˈbrɔfska]; born April 1, 1992) is a Canadian professional tennis player. She reached her career-high doubles ranking of world No. 2 on 23 February 2026. A four-time major champion, she has won two US Open doubles titles, in 2023 and 2025, partnering with Erin Routliffe. She also won the 2017 French Open mixed-doubles title with Rohan Bopanna, becoming the first Canadian woman to win a senior major title, and the 2018 Australian Open with Mate Pavić. Her highest singles ranking of world No. 164 was achieved in November 2014.

== Early life ==
Dabrowski is of Polish origin and speaks English, French, and Polish. Dabrowski played in her first provincial tournament when she was eight. Her first big victory was at the provincial 10-and-under Future Stars at nine years old. Dabrowski was a finalist at the Ontario 14-and-under Provincial Championships and finished in the top 8 at the 14-and-under National Championships. During her teens, she chose to start training at Saddlebrook Academies in Tampa.

== Career ==
=== 2006–12: Early years ===
At the beginning of 2006, she became the first Canadian to win Les Petits As, one of the most prestigious 14-and-under tournaments in the world. In December 2006, Dabrowski reached the doubles final of the 16-and-under Orange Bowl in Miami. Dabrowski also won the Junior Orange Bowl in December 2009 where she defeated top-seeded Kristina Mladenovic. She was the first Canadian to capture the title since Carling Bassett-Seguso did it as a 15-year-old in 1982. At the junior event of the Australian Open in January 2010, Dabrowski was a runner-up in doubles with partner Tímea Babos. She finished 2010 ranked fifth in the junior rankings, and so decided to transition to the professional level. In November 2011, she made it to her first professional singles final at the $50k Toronto Challenger, but lost to qualifier Amra Sadiković. Dabrowski reached, in November 2012, the semifinals of the $75k Challenger in Phoenix.

=== 2013: First WTA Tour doubles final ===
At the end of May, Dabrowski reached the first WTA career final with partner Shahar Pe'er, at the Premier tournament in Brussels. They were defeated by Anna-Lena Grönefeld and Květa Peschke. At the beginning of July at the $50k Waterloo Challenger, Dabrowski made it to the second professional singles final but was defeated by Julia Glushko. At the Rogers Cup in August, she reached the semifinals in doubles with compatriot Sharon Fichman upsetting top-seeded Sara Errani and Roberta Vinci the round before. They lost to Jelena Janković and Katarina Srebotnik. In October, Dabrowski (with partner Alicja Rosolska) reached her second career doubles final at Linz. They were stunned by twin sisters Karolína and Kristýna Plíšková. Dabrowski reached the third singles final at the inaugural $50k SSIR Pro Classic in November, but lost to Mandy Minella.

=== 2014: WTA Tour doubles title, new singles career-high ===
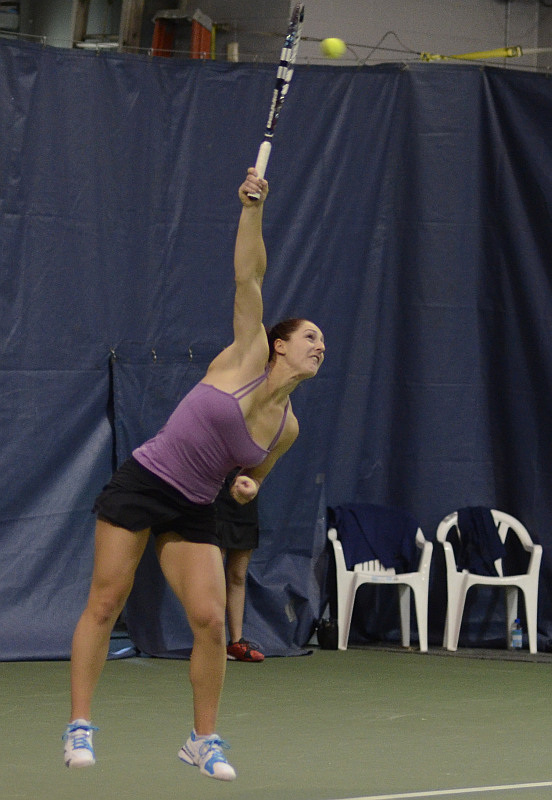
Dabrowski in 2014

At her first competition of the season, the $25k tournament in Vero Beach, Dabrowski reached her fourth singles final but was defeated by Laura Siegemund. At the French Open, she made it to the second round of the doubles event with Alicja Rosolska. In July at the Swedish Open, Dabrowski qualified for her first WTA Tour main draw and upset world No. 39, Camila Giorgi, in the opening round, her first top-50 win. She was eliminated in three sets by Mona Barthel in the next round. At the Washington Open, Dabrowski won her first WTA Tour doubles title, with partner Shuko Aoyama; they defeated Hiroko Kuwata and Kurumi Nara in straight sets in the final. At the US Open, she and Rosolska advanced to the third round. In November, Dabrowski made it to the final of the $50k Toronto Challenger where she won her first pro singles title upsetting Maria Sanchez in the final.

=== 2015: Pan American Games champion ===
At the Australian Open, Dabrowski and partner Rosolska reached the third round of the doubles event with an upset over second seeds Hsieh Su-wei and Sania Mirza. They were eliminated by Michaëlla Krajicek and Barbora Záhlavová-Strýcová in three sets. At the Dubai Championships, Dabrowski qualified for her first WTA Premier main draw with a win over world No. 69, Julia Görges. She lost to Çağla Büyükakçay in three sets in the opening round. In March, at the Monterrey Open, Dabrowski won her second WTA doubles title with partner Rosolska, against the Rodionova sisters. In May, she reached the quarterfinals in doubles at the Premier 5 Italian Open. At her next tournament, the Internationaux de Strasbourg, she qualified for her third tour main draw but lost to Elena Vesnina, in the first round. At the Pan American Games in July, Dabrowski won a gold medal in doubles with Carol Zhao and a silver medal in mixed doubles with Philip Bester. In August at the Rogers Cup, she was awarded a wildcard for the singles main draw but was eliminated in the first round by world No. 26, Flavia Pennetta.

=== 2016: Olympic experience in doubles ===
In February, Dabrowski and María José Martínez Sánchez reached the semifinals of the WTA Premier 5 in Doha. In June, she reached the doubles final of the Nottingham Open with Yang Zhaoxuan. The next week at the inaugural Mallorca Open, she won her third WTA Tour doubles title, this time with partner Martínez Sánchez. At Wimbledon, Dabrowski continued her partnership with the Spaniard. In the opening round, she triumphed against fellow Canadian Eugenie Bouchard and her partner Sabine Lisicki in straight sets, to reach the second round for the first time. In the next round, against Anabel Medina Garrigues and Arantxa Parra Santonja, the duo failed to close out the match and squandered a 6–4, 5–2 lead, and ended up losing in three sets. At the Rio Olympics in August, she advanced to the second round with compatriot Bouchard. In October, Dabrowski and Martínez Sánchez reached the semifinals at the Premier Mandatory in Beijing. She won the second singles title of her career in November at the $25k in Nashville, where she defeated Jennifer Elie in straight sets.

=== 2017: Partnership with Xu Yifan, Grand Slam mixed doubles title ===
In January at the Hobart International, Dabrowski reached the final in doubles with Yang Zhaoxuan. In April, she won her first Premier Mandatory doubles title in Miami defeating, with new partner Xu Yifan, the third seeds Sania Mirza and Barbora Strýcová in the final. In May, she qualified for the tournament in Rabat, achieving this feat for the fourth time in her career and the first since 2015. She defeated Lina Qostal in her opener for her second WTA Tour main-draw win but lost to Francesca Schiavone in the second round.

At the French Open, Dabrowski reached the third round in doubles and won the title in mixed doubles with Rohan Bopanna, becoming the first Canadian woman to win a major title. At the Premier event in New Haven, she captured her second doubles title of the season, also her second with partner Xu Yifan. At the US Open, she advanced to the quarterfinals in both doubles and mixed doubles. In September at the Tournoi de Québec, she qualified for her second WTA Tour main draw of the season, before losing to defending champion Océane Dodin in the first round, in three sets. In October, Dabrowski qualified for her first WTA Finals with Xu Yifan, but they lost in the quarterfinals to defending champions, Ekaterina Makarova and Elena Vesnina.

=== 2018: Second major title and top 10 debut in doubles ===
In January, Dabrowski won her sixth WTA Tour doubles title and her third with partner Xu Yifan at the Premier event in Sydney. At the Australian Open, she reached the quarterfinals in women's doubles with Xu Yifan and won the mixed-doubles event with Mate Pavić, her second Grand Slam title. In February, she won the then-second biggest doubles title with a victory at the Premier 5 in Doha with Jeļena Ostapenko. With this win, she became only the fourth Canadian female player to reach the top 10 in singles or doubles, with a debut at No. 8. At the French Open, Dabrowski reached the final in mixed doubles for the second straight year, this time with Pavić, but failed to defend her title with a loss to Latisha Chan and Ivan Dodig. She also made it to the third round in doubles with Xu.

=== 2019: First Wimbledon doubles final ===
In May, Dabrowski and Xu were runners-up in the Madrid Open, which they followed up by winning the Nuremberg Cup. In June, they reached the quarterfinals of the French Open.

They reached the final of Wimbledon, losing to Hsieh Su-wei and Barbora Strýcová. In August, they reached the semifinals of the Rogers Cup, and two weeks later reached the quarterfinals of the US Open. Their performance during the year earned them a place in the WTA Finals, but they went out at the round-robin stage. Dabrowski and Pavić reached the final of the French Open for the second successive year, but were again beaten by Chan and Dodig.

=== 2020–2021: WTA 1000 title, six WTA Tour finals, world No. 5 ===
Dabrowski reached the finals of the Premier event in Adelaide playing with Darija Jurak. At the 2020 Australian Open, she reached the quarterfinals in women's doubles with Jeļena Ostapenko, and the semifinals of mixed doubles with Henri Kontinen. With Ostapenko, she reached also the WTA 1000 event final at the Qatar Ladies Open.

In October, she reached another Premier final, in Ostrava, playing with new partner Luisa Stefani.

Seeded fifth, Dabrowski won her third WTA 1000 and first with Stefani at the 2021 Canadian Open, avenging their loss in the final in San Jose to Darija Jurak and Andreja Klepač. The following week, they followed this successful run by another, reaching the WTA 1000 final at the Cincinnati Open by defeating current Olympic champions, second seeded pair Barbora Krejčíková and Kateřina Siniaková. They lost the final to Sam Stosur and Zhang Shuai.

In their first Grand Slam event together, the duo reached the semifinals of the US Open, but they were forced to retire when Stefani injured her knee. On October 18, 2021, Dabrowski ascended to world No. 5 in the WTA doubles rankings, thus becoming the highest ranked Canadian ever in the discipline.

=== 2022: New partnerships, WTA 1000 title, world No. 4 ===
Dabrowski announced she will play the 2022 season with Giuliana Olmos, with whom she had partnered to reach the semifinals at the 2021 Miami Open, but stated she could be open to play again with Stefani. Seeded second, they went on to win their first WTA1000 together at the Madrid Open. Dabrowski and Olmos followed that by also reaching the final of the Italian Open. She reached a new career-high doubles ranking of No. 4, on 11 July 2022.

In September, Dabrowski reunited with Stefani in her return to WTA Tour and won with her the Chennai Open, afterwards getting the Pan Pacific Open title with Olmos, both titles without losing a single set. Following this successful runs, she qualified for her fourth WTA Finals with Olmos in their first appearance as a team.

=== 2023: US Open and BJK champion, return to top 10 ===
In August, seeded 16th as a pair with new partner Erin Routliffe at the US Open, Dabrowski made her eleventh Grand Slam quarterfinal. They defeated sixth seeds Leylah Fernandez and Taylor Townsend in three sets to make the semifinals. There, they defeated Hsieh Su-wei who was on a 16-match major winning streak, having won both the 2023 French Open and the 2023 Wimbledon Championships, and Wang Xinyu to reach the final for the first time in Routliffe's career and second in Dabrowski's. In the final, they took on former champions Laura Siegemund and Vera Zvonareva. They defeated them in straight sets to claim the US Open title, a first major title for both players. As a result, she returned to the top 10, at world No. 9 on 11 September 2023. At the Guadalajara Open, the pair reached their first WTA 1000 final defeating Jasmine Paolini and Mayar Sherif.

Their strong performance in the latter half of 2023 meant Dabrowski/Routliffe qualified for the WTA Finals in Cancún. This was Dabrowski's fifth year qualifying for the year-end tournament, and Routliffe's first. There the pair went undefeated in the group stage, without dropping a set, setting up a semifinal match with the eighth seeds Nicole Melichar-Martinez and Ellen Perez. Dabrowski/Routliffe lost the match in a tight match tiebreaker.

Dabrowski was named to Team Canada during the Billie Jean King Cup finals in November 2023. Dabrowski won all three of her doubles matches, helping Team Canada secure the victory. It marked the first time Canada won the BJK trophy.

=== 2024: Second Wimbledon final, WTA Finals champion ===
Dabrowski reached a second WTA 1000 final with Erin Routliffe at the Miami Open where the pair lost to alternates Bethanie Mattek-Sands and Sofia Kenin in a deciding champions tiebreak.

In June, Dabrowski and Routliffe won the Nottingham Open beating Harriet Dart and Diane Parry in the final. Alongside Routliffe, she reached her second final at Wimbledon losing to Kateřina Siniaková and Taylor Townsend. As a result, she reached a new career-high in doubles of world No. 3 on 15 July.

Seeded second at the WTA Finals in Riyadh, Saudi Arabia, Dabrowski and Routliffe went unbeaten to top their group and reach the semifinals, where they defeated Nicole Melichar-Martinez and Ellen Perez, in straight sets. Dabrowski and Routliffe defeated Kateřina Siniaková and Taylor Townsend in the final to claim their first WTA Tour Finals title. In the process Dabrowski became the first Canadian to win a WTA Finals title.

=== 2025: Second US Open title ===
Seeded second, Dabrowski and Routliffe reached the semifinals at the Australian Open, but lost to Jeļena Ostapenko and Hsieh Su-wei.

In April, they won the doubles title at the Stuttgart Open, defeating Ekaterina Alexandrova and Zhang Shuai in the final.

Dabrowski and Routliffe won their first WTA 1000 title as a team at the Cincinnati Open in August, defeating Guo Hanyu and Alexandra Panova in the final. The following month they secured their second US Open title together, overcoming top seeds Kateřina Siniaková and Taylor Townsend in the final, in straight sets.

Defending their title at the end of season WTA Finals in November, Dabrowski and Routliffe were eliminated in the round-robin stage with a record of one win and two losses leaving them in third place in their group.

=== 2026: World No. 2, third Wimbledon final, back with Stefani & 100th major match win ===
In November 2025, it was announced that Dabrowski would return to play alongside Luisa Stefani, after almost three years since their last match together, initially to participate at the Adelaide International. Despite this, Stefani and Dabrowski did not compete together in Adelaide, as Dabrowski suffered a foot injury in the pre-season and chose not to participate in order to recover for Melbourne; instead, Stefani played alongside Marie Bouzková. Dabrowski and Stefani resumed their partnership at the 2026 Australian Open where they reached the semifinals and were defeated in three sets by Anna Danilina and Aleksandra Krunić.

Next, Dabrowski and Stefani went to play the Middle Eastern Swing, first at the Qatar Ladies Open, where they also reached semifinals and also lost to Danilina and Krunic, this time in straight sets. They also played at the Dubai Open where they won their third title together, their first since 2022 and second on the WTA 1000 level, by defeating Laura Siegemund and Vera Zvonareva in the final. The pair were among the players featured in the fan vote for "Star of the Swing" on the WTA Unlocked at the WTA's website, but they did not win the fan poll.

In Indian Wells, where they reached the quarterfinals, they were defeated in three sets by Cristina Bucsa and Nicole Melichar-Martinez. At the Miami Open, they reached their fourth semifinal of the season in five tournaments. They were defeated by Siniaková and Townsend, in three sets.

They decided to withdraw from the 2026 Madrid Open Dabrowski and Stefani played in Rome, at the Italian Open, but they ended up losing their first-round match against Alexandra Panova and Marie Bouzková, in three sets. Then in Strasbourg, they won the title defeating Quinn Gleason and Ulrikke Eikeri in the final. It was their fourth title playing together, the second in 2026, and the very first on clay. At Roland Garros, they reached the semifinals but lost again to Siniaková and Townsend.

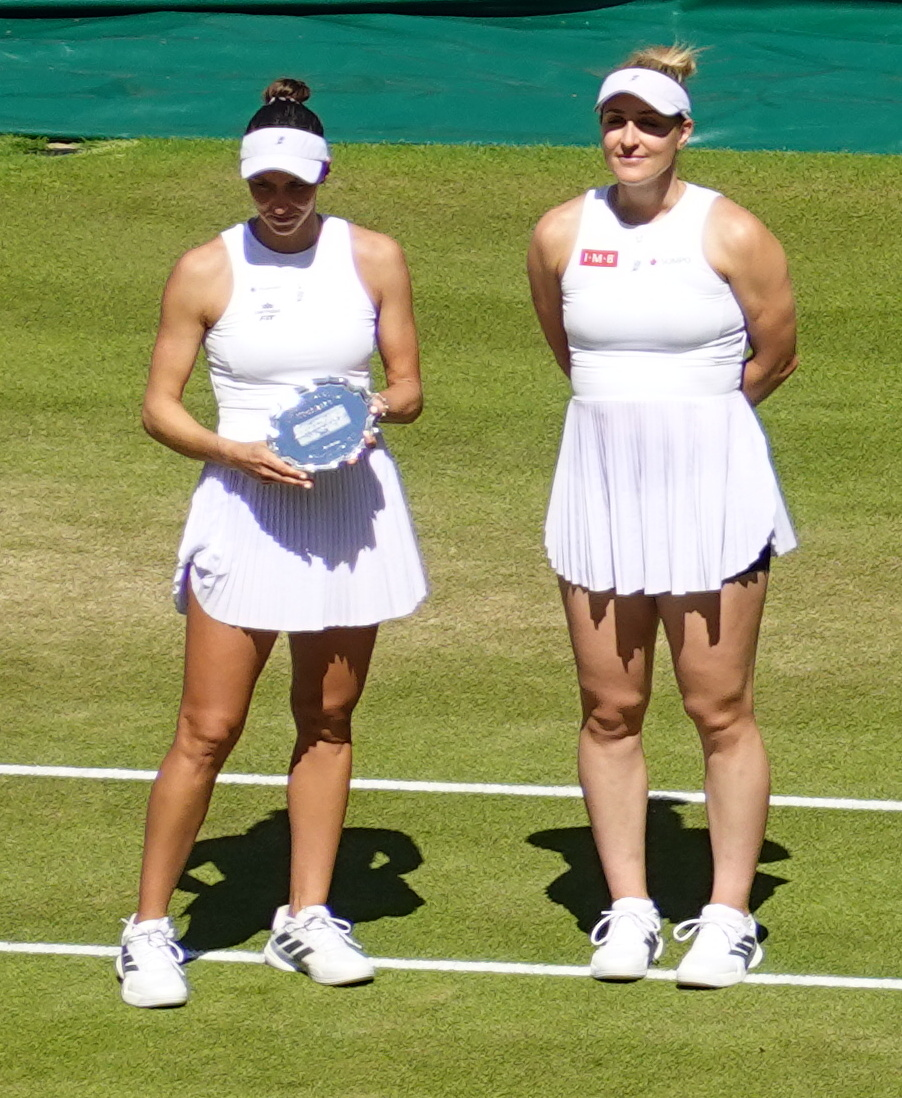
Dabrowski and Stefani at the 2026 Wimbledon trophy ceremony

Dabrowski and Stefani then started the grass-court season at the 2026 Queen's Club Championships, their first grass tournament together. They were defeated in the second round by Iva Jović and McCartney Kessler, in three sets. At Eastbourne, they won the title by defeating Czech pair of Jesika Malečková and Miriam Škoch in the final, which was postponed by one day due to rain. It was their third title of the season in the third final. It was their five title playing together, and second on the WTA 250 level. At the 2026 Wimbledon Championships, as second seeds, Dabrowski recorded her 100th main-draw win in Grand Slam tournaments, when she and Stefani defeated Alexa Guarachi and Alicja Rosolska, in straight sets.

In the quarterfinal, they defeated unseeded pair of Katarzyna Piter and Anna Sisková. In their first semifinal, they won against No. 13 seeds Shuko Aoyama and Liang En-shuo.

Dabrowski reached her third final at the event, but lost again, this time to Kristina Mladenovic and Guo Hanyu, in straight sets. It was the pair's first major final together.

== World TeamTennis ==
Dabrowski made her World TeamTennis as a wildcard player for the Philadelphia Freedoms. She returned as a roster player for the Orange County Breakers in the 2020 season at The Greenbrier.

== Personal life ==
On 31 December 2024, Dabrowski revealed she had been diagnosed with breast cancer in April that year and had undergone treatment including two surgeries during a three-month break from tennis. Writing on Instagram she said it was "a privilege to call myself a survivor" and "early detection saves lives."

Following her diagnosis, Dabrowski became involved in charitable initiatives focused on women's issues. During the 2026 season, she pledged to donate US$20 for every game she won to organizations supporting the prevention of violence against women and girls. At the 2026 SP Open, where she won the women's doubles title with Luisa Stefani, she donated US$640 based on 32 games won.

The initiative was undertaken in collaboration with High Impact Athletes, an organization that connects athletes with charitable organizations.

Since 2020, Dabrowski is a Global Ambassador of the Special Olympics, the Olympics for intellectually disabled athletes.

== Homages and tributes ==
Since 2018, the public tennis courts at Russell Boyd Park in Ottawa, Canada, where Dabrowski began playing tennis, have been named in her honor.

== Grand Slam tournament finals ==
=== Doubles: 5 (2 titles, 3 runner-ups) ===
| Result | Year | Championship | Surface | Partner | Opponents | Score |
|---|---|---|---|---|---|---|
| Loss | 2019 | Wimbledon | Grass | (China) Xu Yifan | (Czech Republic) Barbora Strýcová (Chinese Taipei) Hsieh Su-wei | 2–6, 4–6 |
| Win | 2023 | US Open | Hard | (New Zealand) Erin Routliffe | (Germany) Laura Siegemund; Vera Zvonareva | 7–6^{(11–9)}, 6–3 |
| Loss | 2024 | Wimbledon | Grass | (New Zealand) Erin Routliffe | (Czech Republic) Kateřina Siniaková (United States) Taylor Townsend | 6–7^{(5–7)}, 6–7^{(1–7)} |
| Win | 2025 | US Open (2) | Hard | (New Zealand) Erin Routliffe | (Czech Republic) Kateřina Siniaková (United States) Taylor Townsend | 6–4, 6–4 |
| Loss | 2026 | Wimbledon | Grass | (Brazil) Luisa Stefani | (France) Kristina Mladenovic (China) Guo Hanyu | 3–6, 5–7 |

=== Mixed doubles: 5 (2 titles, 3 runner-ups) ===
| Result | Year | Championship | Surface | Partner | Opponents | Score |
|---|---|---|---|---|---|---|
| Win | 2017 | French Open | Clay | (India) Rohan Bopanna | (Germany) Anna-Lena Grönefeld (Colombia) Robert Farah | 2–6, 6–2, [12–10] |
| Win | 2018 | Australian Open | Hard | (Croatia) Mate Pavić | (Hungary) Tímea Babos (India) Rohan Bopanna | 2–6, 6–4, [11–9] |
| Loss | 2018 | French Open | Clay | (Croatia) Mate Pavić | (Chinese Taipei) Latisha Chan (Croatia) Ivan Dodig | 1–6, 7–6^{(7–5)}, [8–10] |
| Loss | 2019 | French Open | Clay | (Croatia) Mate Pavić | (Chinese Taipei) Latisha Chan (Croatia) Ivan Dodig | 1–6, 6–7^{(5–7)} |
| Loss | 2026 | French Open | Clay | (United States) Evan King | (Italy) Sara Errani (Italy) Andrea Vavassori | 6–4, 3–6, [4–10] |

== Other significant finals ==
=== WTA 1000 tournaments ===
==== Doubles: 17 (8 titles, 9 runner-ups) ====
| Result | Year | Tournament | Surface | Partner | Opponents | Score |
|---|---|---|---|---|---|---|
| Win | 2017 | Miami Open | Hard | (China) Xu Yifan | (India) Sania Mirza (Czech Republic) Barbora Strýcová | 6–4, 6–3 |
| Win | 2018 | WTA Qatar Open | Hard | (Latvia) Jeļena Ostapenko | (Slovenia) Andreja Klepač (Spain) María José M. Sánchez | 6–3, 6–3 |
| Loss | 2018 | China Open | Hard | (China) Xu Yifan | (Czech Republic) Andrea Sestini Hlaváčková (Czech Republic) Barbora Strýcová | 6–4, 4–6, [8–10] |
| Loss | 2019 | Madrid Open | Clay | (China) Xu Yifan | (Chinese Taipei) Hsieh Su-wei (Czech Republic) Barbora Strýcová | 3–6, 1–6 |
| Loss | 2020 | Qatar Ladies Open | Hard | (Latvia) Jeļena Ostapenko | (Chinese Taipei) Hsieh Su-wei (Czech Republic) Barbora Strýcová | 2–6, 7–5, [2–10] |
| Loss | 2021 | Madrid Open | Clay | (Netherlands) Demi Schuurs | (Czech Republic) Barbora Krejčíková (Czech Republic) Kateřina Siniaková | 4–6, 3–6 |
| Win | 2021 | Canadian Open | Hard | (Brazil) Luisa Stefani | (Croatia) Darija Jurak (Slovenia) Andrea Klepac | 6–3, 6–4 |
| Loss | 2021 | Cincinnati Open | Hard | (Brazil) Luisa Stefani | (Australia) Samantha Stosur (China) Zhang Shuai | 5–7, 3–6 |
| Win | 2022 | Madrid Open | Clay | (Mexico) Giuliana Olmos | (United States) Desirae Krawczyk (Netherlands) Demi Schuurs | 7–6^{(7–1)}, 5–7, [10–7] |
| Loss | 2022 | Italian Open | Clay | (Mexico) Giuliana Olmos | Veronika Kudermetova; Anastasia Pavlyuchenkova | 6–1, 4–6, [7–10] |
| Loss | 2023 | Guadalajara Open | Hard | (New Zealand) Erin Routliffe | (Australia) Storm Hunter (Belgium) Elise Mertens | 6–3, 2–6, [4–10] |
| Loss | 2024 | Miami Open | Hard | (New Zealand) Erin Routliffe | (United States) Sofia Kenin (United States) Bethanie Mattek-Sands | 6–4, 6–7^{(5–7)}, [9–11] |
| Loss | 2024 | Canadian Open | Hard | (New Zealand) Erin Routliffe | (United States) Caroline Dolehide (United States) Desirae Krawczyk | 6–7^{(2–7)}, 6–3, [7–10] |
| Win | 2025 | Cincinnati Open | Hard | (New Zealand) Erin Routliffe | Alexandra Panova (China) Guo Hanyu | 6–4, 6–3 |
| Win | 2026 | Dubai Championships | Hard | (Brazil) Luisa Stefani | (Germany) Laura Siegemund; Vera Zvonareva | 6–1, 6–3 |
| Win | 2026 | China Open | Hard | (Brazil) Luisa Stefani | (Czech Republic) Katerina Siniakova (China) Zhang Shuai | 6–1, 6–2 |
| Win | 2026 | Wuhan Open | Hard | (Brazil) Luisa Stefani | (Australia) Storm Hunter (Czech Republic) Katerina Siniakova | 7–5, 6–4 |

=== Olympic medal matches ===
==== Mixed doubles: 1 (bronze medal) ====
| Result | Year | Tournament | Surface | Partner | Opponents | Score |
|---|---|---|---|---|---|---|
| Bronze | 2024 | Paris Olympics | Clay | (Canada) Félix Auger-Aliassime | (Netherlands) Demi Schuurs (Netherlands) Wesley Koolhof | 6–3, 7–6^{(7–2)} |

== WTA Tour finals ==
=== Doubles: 48 (26 titles, 22 runner-ups) ===
| Legend Grand Slam tournaments (2–3) WTA Finals (1–0) Premier M & 5 / WTA 1000 (8–9) Premier / WTA 500 (7–7) International / WTA 250 (8–3) | Finals by surface Hard (18–13) Clay (4–4) Grass (4–5) |

| Result | W–L | Date | Tournament | Tier | Surface | Partner | Opponents | Score |
|---|---|---|---|---|---|---|---|---|
| Loss | 0–1 | May 2013 | Brussels Open, Belgium | Premier | Clay | (Israel) Shahar Pe'er | (Germany) Anna-Lena Grönefeld (Czech Republic) Květa Peschke | 0–6, 3–6 |
| Loss | 0–2 | Oct 2013 | Ladies Linz, Austria | International | Hard (i) | (Poland) Alicja Rosolska | (Czech Republic) Karolína Plíšková (Czech Republic) Kristýna Plíšková | 6–7^{(6–8)}, 4–6 |
| Win | 1–2 | Aug 2014 | Washington Open, United States | International | Hard | (Japan) Shuko Aoyama | (Japan) Hiroko Kuwata (Japan) Kurumi Nara | 6–1, 6–2 |
| Win | 2–2 | Mar 2015 | Monterrey Open, Mexico | International | Hard | (Poland) Alicja Rosolska | (Australia) Anastasia Rodionova (Australia) Arina Rodionova | 6–3, 2–6, [10–3] |
| Loss | 2–3 | Jun 2016 | Nottingham Open, UK | International | Grass | (China) Yang Zhaoxuan | (Czech Republic) Andrea Hlaváčková (China) Peng Shuai | 5–7, 6–3, [7–10] |
| Win | 3–3 | Jun 2016 | Mallorca Open, Spain | International | Grass | (Spain) María José Martínez Sánchez | (Germany) Anna-Lena Friedsam (Germany) Laura Siegemund | 6–4, 6–2 |
| Loss | 3–4 | Jan 2017 | Hobart International, Australia | International | Hard | (China) Yang Zhaoxuan | (Romania) Raluca Olaru (Ukraine) Olga Savchuk | 6–0, 4–6, [5–10] |
| Win | 4–4 | Apr 2017 | Miami Open, United States | Premier M | Hard | (China) Xu Yifan | (India) Sania Mirza (Czech Republic) Barbora Strýcová | 6–4, 6–3 |
| Win | 5–4 | Aug 2017 | Connecticut Open, US | Premier | Hard | (China) Xu Yifan | (Australia) Ashleigh Barty (Australia) Casey Dellacqua | 3–6, 6–3, [10–8] |
| Win | 6–4 | Jan 2018 | Sydney International, Australia | Premier | Hard | (China) Xu Yifan | (Chinese Taipei) Latisha Chan (Czech Republic) Andrea Sestini Hlaváčková | 6–3, 6–1 |
| Win | 7–4 | Feb 2018 | Qatar Ladies Open, Qatar | Premier 5 | Hard | (Latvia) Jeļena Ostapenko | (Slovenia) Andreja Klepač (Spain) María José Martínez Sánchez | 6–3, 6–3 |
| Win | 8–4 | Jun 2018 | Eastbourne International, UK | Premier | Grass | (China) Xu Yifan | (Romania) Irina-Camelia Begu (Romania) Mihaela Buzărnescu | 6–3, 7–5 |
| Loss | 8–5 | Oct 2018 | China Open, China | Premier M | Hard | (China) Xu Yifan | (Czech Republic) Andrea Sestini Hlaváčková (Czech Republic) Barbora Strýcová | 6–4, 4–6, [8–10] |
| Loss | 8–6 | May 2019 | Madrid Open, Spain | Premier M | Clay | (China) Xu Yifan | (Chinese Taipei) Hsieh Su-wei (Czech Republic) Barbora Strýcová | 3–6, 1–6 |
| Win | 9–6 | May 2019 | Nuremberg Cup, Germany | International | Clay | (China) Xu Yifan | (Canada) Sharon Fichman (United States) Nicole Melichar | 4–6, 7–6^{(7–5)}, [10–5] |
| Loss | 9–7 | Jul 2019 | Wimbledon, UK | Grand Slam | Grass | (China) Xu Yifan | (Chinese Taipei) Hsieh Su-wei (Czech Republic) Barbora Strýcová | 2–6, 4–6 |
| Loss | 9–8 | Jan 2020 | Adelaide International, Australia | Premier | Hard | (Croatia) Darija Jurak | (United States) Nicole Melichar (China) Xu Yifan | 6–2, 5–7, [5–10] |
| Loss | 9–9 | Feb 2020 | Qatar Ladies Open | Premier 5 | Hard | (Latvia) Jeļena Ostapenko | (Chinese Taipei) Hsieh Su-wei (Czech Republic) Barbora Strýcová | 2–6, 7–5, [2–10] |
| Loss | 9–10 | Oct 2020 | Ostrava Open, Czech Republic | Premier | Hard (i) | (Brazil) Luisa Stefani | (Belgium) Elise Mertens (Belarus) Aryna Sabalenka | 1–6, 3–6 |
| Loss | 9–11 | May 2021 | Madrid Open, Spain | WTA 1000 | Clay | (Netherlands) Demi Schuurs | (Czech Republic) Barbora Krejčíková (Czech Republic) Kateřina Siniaková | 4–6, 3–6 |
| Loss | 9–12 | Aug 2021 | Silicon Valley Classic, US | WTA 500 | Hard | (Brazil) Luisa Stefani | (Croatia) Darija Jurak (Slovenia) Andreja Klepač | 1–6, 5–7 |
| Win | 10–12 | Aug 2021 | Canadian Open, Canada | WTA 1000 | Hard | (Brazil) Luisa Stefani | (Croatia) Darija Jurak (Slovenia) Andreja Klepač | 6–3, 6–4 |
| Loss | 10–13 | Aug 2021 | Cincinnati Open, US | WTA 1000 | Hard | (Brazil) Luisa Stefani | (Australia) Samantha Stosur (China) Zhang Shuai | 5–7, 3–6 |
| Win | 11–13 | May 2022 | Madrid Open, Spain | WTA 1000 | Clay | (Mexico) Giuliana Olmos | (United States) Desirae Krawczyk (Netherlands) Demi Schuurs | 7–6^{(7–1)}, 5–7, [10–7] |
| Loss | 11–14 | May 2022 | Italian Open, Italy | WTA 1000 | Clay | (Mexico) Giuliana Olmos | (Russia) Veronika Kudermetova (Russia) Anastasia Pavlyuchenkova | 6–1, 4–6, [7–10] |
| Win | 12–14 | Sep 2022 | Chennai Open, India | WTA 250 | Hard | (Brazil) Luisa Stefani | (Russia) Anna Blinkova (Georgia (country)) Natela Dzalamidze | 6–1, 6–2 |
| Win | 13–14 | Sep 2022 | Pan Pacific Open, Japan | WTA 500 | Hard | (Mexico) Giuliana Olmos | (United States) Nicole Melichar-Martinez (Australia) Ellen Perez | 6–4, 6–4 |
| Loss | 13–15 | Oct 2022 | San Diego Open, US | WTA 500 | Hard | (Mexico) Giuliana Olmos | (United States) Coco Gauff (United States) Jessica Pegula | 6–1, 5–7, [4–10] |
| Win | 14–15 | Sep 2023 | US Open, United States | Grand Slam | Hard | (New Zealand) Erin Routliffe | (Germany) Laura Siegemund (Russia) Vera Zvonareva | 7–6^{(11–9)}, 6–3 |
| Loss | 14–16 | Sep 2023 | Guadalajara Open, Mexico | WTA 1000 | Hard | (New Zealand) Erin Routliffe | (Australia) Storm Hunter (Belgium) Elise Mertens | 6–3, 2–6, [4–10] |
| Win | 15–16 | Oct 2023 | Zhengzhou Open, China | WTA 500 | Hard | (New Zealand) Erin Routliffe | (Japan) Shuko Aoyama (Japan) Ena Shibahara | 6–2, 6–4 |
| Loss | 15–17 | Mar 2024 | Miami Open, US | WTA 1000 | Hard | (New Zealand) Erin Routliffe | (United States) Sofia Kenin (United States) Bethanie Mattek-Sands | 6–4, 6–7^{(5–7)}, [9–11] |
| Win | 16–17 | Jun 2024 | Nottingham Open, UK | WTA 250 | Grass | (New Zealand) Erin Routliffe | (United Kingdom) Harriet Dart (France) Diane Parry | 5–7, 6–3, [11–9] |
| Loss | 16–18 | Jun 2024 | Eastbourne International, UK | WTA 500 | Grass | (New Zealand) Erin Routliffe | (Ukraine) Lyudmyla Kichenok (Latvia) Jeļena Ostapenko | 7–5, 6–7^{(2–7)}, [8–10] |
| Loss | 16–19 | Jul 2024 | Wimbledon, UK | Grand Slam | Grass | (New Zealand) Erin Routliffe | (Czech Republic) Kateřina Siniaková (United States) Taylor Townsend | 6–7^{(5–7)}, 6–7^{(1–7)} |
| Loss | 16–20 | Aug 2024 | Canadian Open, Canada | WTA 1000 | Hard | (New Zealand) Erin Routliffe | (United States) Caroline Dolehide (United States) Desirae Krawczyk | 6–7^{(2–7)}, 6–3, [7–10] |
| Win | 17–20 | Nov 2024 | WTA Finals, Saudi Arabia | WTA Finals | Hard | (New Zealand) Erin Routliffe | (Czech Republic) Kateřina Siniaková (United States) Taylor Townsend | 7–5, 6–3 |
| Win | 18–20 | Apr 2025 | Stuttgart Open, Germany | WTA 500 | Clay (i) | (New Zealand) Erin Routliffe | (Russia) Ekaterina Alexandrova (China) Zhang Shuai | 6–3, 6–3 |
| Win | 19–20 | Aug 2025 | Cincinnati Open, US | WTA 1000 | Hard | (New Zealand) Erin Routliffe | (China) Guo Hanyu (Russia) Alexandra Panova | 6–4, 6–3 |
| Win | 20–20 | Sep 2025 | US Open, United States | Grand Slam | Hard | (New Zealand) Erin Routliffe | (Czech Republic) Kateřina Siniaková (United States) Taylor Townsend | 6–4, 6–4 |
| Win | 21–20 | Feb 2026 | Dubai Open, UAE | WTA 1000 | Hard | (Brazil) Luisa Stefani | (Germany) Laura Siegemund; Vera Zvonareva | 6–1, 6–3 |
| Win | 22–20 | May 2026 | Internationaux de Strasbourg, France | WTA 500 | Clay | (Brazil) Luisa Stefani | (Norway) Ulrikke Eikeri (United States) Quinn Gleason | 7–5, 6–4 |
| Win | 23–20 | Jun 2026 | Eastbourne International, UK | WTA 250 | Grass | (Brazil) Luisa Stefani | (Czech Republic) Jesika Malečková (Czech Republic) Miriam Škoch | 6–1, 6–4 |
| Loss | 23–21 | Jul 2026 | Wimbledon, UK | Grand Slam | Grass | (Brazil) Luisa Stefani | (France) Kristina Mladenovic (China) Guo Hanyu | 3–6, 5–7 |
| Win | 24–21 | Sep 2026 | SP Open, Brazil | WTA 250 | Hard | (Brazil) Luisa Stefani | (United States) Anna Rogers (United States) Allura Zamarripa | 6–3, 3–6, [10–7] |
| Win | 25–21 | Oct 2026 | China Open, China | WTA 1000 | Hard | (Brazil) Luisa Stefani | (Czech Republic) Katerina Siniakova (China) Zhang Shuai | 6–1, 6–2 |
| Win | 26–21 | Oct 2026 | Wuhan Open, China | WTA 1000 | Hard | (Brazil) Luisa Stefani | (Australia) Storm Hunter (Czech Republic) Katerina Siniakova | 7–5, 6–4 |
| Loss | 26–22 | Oct 2026 | Pan Pacific Open, Japan | WTA 500 | Hard | (Brazil) Luisa Stefani | (Italy) Sara Errani (Italy) Jasmine Paolini | 2-6, 2-6 |

== Performance timelines ==
Key
| W | F | SF | QF | #R | RR | Q# | P# | DNQ | A | Z# | PO | G | S | B | NMS | NTI | P | NH |

(W) winner; (F) finalist; (SF) semifinalist; (QF) quarterfinalist; (#R) rounds 4, 3, 2, 1; (RR) round-robin stage; (Q#) qualification round; (P#) preliminary round; (DNQ) did not qualify; (A) absent; (Z#) Davis/Fed Cup Zonal Group (with number indication) or (PO) play-off; (G) gold, (S) silver or (B) bronze Olympic/Paralympic medal; (NMS) not a Masters tournament; (NTI) not a Tier I tournament; (P) postponed; (NH) not held; (SR) strike rate (events won / competed); (W–L) win–loss record.
To avoid confusion and double counting, these charts are updated at the conclusion of a tournament or when the player's participation has ended.

=== Doubles ===
Current through the 2025 US Open.

| Tournament | 2008 | 2009 | 2010 | 2011 | 2012 | 2013 | 2014 | 2015 | 2016 | 2017 | 2018 | 2019 | 2020 | 2021 | 2022 | 2023 | 2024 | 2025 | 2026 | SR | W–L | Win% |
|---|---|---|---|---|---|---|---|---|---|---|---|---|---|---|---|---|---|---|---|---|---|---|
Grand Slam tournaments
| Australian Open | A | A | A | A | A | A | A | 3R | 1R | 2R | QF | 1R | QF | 2R | 2R | 3R | SF | SF | SF | 0 / 12 | 24–12 | 67% |
| French Open | A | A | A | A | A | A | 2R | 1R | 2R | 3R | 3R | QF | 3R | 3R | 3R | 3R | A | A | SF | 0 / 11 | 19–11 | 63% |
| Wimbledon | A | A | A | A | A | Q1 | 1R | 1R | 2R | 1R | SF | F | NH | 1R | 3R | 1R | F | QF | F | 0 / 12 | 25–12 | 68% |
| US Open | A | A | A | A | A | A | 3R | 1R | 1R | QF | 2R | QF | QF | SF | QF | W | QF | W | SF | 2 / 13 | 35–11 | 76% |
| Win–loss | 0–0 | 0–0 | 0–0 | 0–0 | 0–0 | 0–0 | 3–3 | 2–4 | 2–4 | 6–4 | 10–4 | 11–4 | 6–3 | 6–4 | 7–4 | 9–3 | 11–3 | 13–2 | 17–4 | 2 / 48 | 103–46 | 69% |
Year-end championships
| WTA Finals | Did not qualify | | | | | | | | | QF | QF | RR | NH | A | RR | SF | W | RR | | 1 / 6 | 11–9 | 55% |
| WTA Elite Trophy | Not held | | | | | | | RR | DNQ | A | A | A | NH | | | A | NH | | | 0 / 1 | 0–2 | 0% |
National representation
| Summer Olympics | A | Not held | | | A | Not held | | | 2R | Not held | | | | 1R | Not held | | 2R | NH | NH | 0 / 3 | 2–3 | 40% |
| Fed Cup | A | A | A | A | A | AZ1 | PO | QF | WG2 | WG2 | WG2 | PO | QR | RR | RR | W | QF | A | | 1 / 12 | 15–7 | 68% |
WTA 1000
| Qatar Open^{[1]} | A | A | A | A | A | A | A | | SF | | W | | F | | 2R | A | 2R | 2R | SF | 1 / 7 | 15–6 | 71% |
| Dubai^{[1]} | A | A | A | A | A | A | A | 1R | | QF | | QF | | 1R | | A | SF | 2R | W | 1 / 6 | 10–6 | 63% |
| Indian Wells Open | A | A | A | A | A | A | A | 1R | 1R | 1R | SF | SF | NH | 2R | SF | QF | 2R | 2R | QF | 0 / 11 | 16–11 | 59% |
| Miami Open | A | A | A | A | A | A | A | 2R | 1R | W | 1R | QF | NH | SF | 2R | 1R | F | 1R | SF | 1 / 10 | 17–9 | 65% |
| Madrid Open | NH | A | A | A | A | A | 1R | 1R | 1R | 2R | 2R | F | NH | F | W | QF | A | 1R | A | 1 / 10 | 15–9 | 63% |
| Italian Open | A | A | A | A | A | A | 1R | QF | 1R | 1R | QF | 2R | 2R | 2R | F | 1R | A | QF | 1R | 0 / 12 | 9–12 | 43% |
| Canadian Open | 1R | A | A | A | A | SF | 2R | 1R | 1R | QF | 1R | SF | NH | W | SF | 2R | F | 1R | 1R | 1 / 14 | 19–13 | 59% |
| Cincinnati Open | NMS | A | A | A | A | A | 1R | A | 1R | 2R | A | 2R | 1R | F | QF | 3R | A | W | 2R | 1 / 10 | 14–9 | 61% |
| Guadalajara Open | NTI/NH | | | | | | | | | | | | | | QF | F | NTI | | | 0 / 2 | 4–2 | 67% |
| China Open | NMS | A | A | A | A | A | A | 2R | SF | QF | F | QF | NH | | | 2R | 2R | 1R | W | 1 / 9 | 16–8 | 67% |
| Pan Pacific / Wuhan Open^{[2]} | A | A | A | A | A | A | A | QF | 2R | QF | QF | 2R | NH | | | | QF | A | W | 1 / 7 | 11–6 | 65% |
Career statistics
| | 2008 | 2009 | 2010 | 2011 | 2012 | 2013 | 2014 | 2015 | 2016 | 2017 | 2018 | 2019 | 2020 | 2021 | 2022 | 2023 | 2024 | 2025 | 2026 | SR | W–L | Win % |
| Tournaments | 1 | 0 | 0 | 1 | 2 | 11 | 17 | 23 | 27 | 27 | 21 | 24 | 11 | 18 | 9 | 20 | 17 | 15 | 18 | Career total: 220 | | |
| Titles | 0 | 0 | 0 | 0 | 0 | 0 | 1 | 1 | 1 | 2 | 3 | 1 | 0 | 1 | 3 | 2 | 2 | 3 | 6 | Career total: 26 | | |
| Finals | 0 | 0 | 0 | 0 | 0 | 2 | 1 | 1 | 2 | 3 | 4 | 3 | 3 | 4 | 4 | 3 | 6 | 3 | 8 | Career total: 48 | | |
| Hard win–loss | 0–1 | 0–0 | 0–0 | 0–1 | 1–1 | 9–6 | 10–10 | 16–19 | 13–17 | 32–15 | 25–11 | 19–16 | 16–8 | 23–11 | 15–11 | 29–12 | 27–11 | 19–11 | 15-8 | 10 / 152 | 224–147 | 60% |
| Clay win–loss | 0–0 | 0–0 | 0–0 | 0–0 | 0–0 | 3–3 | 2–7 | 2–4 | 5–7 | 5–6 | 3–5 | 15–5 | 4–3 | 8–5 | 8–2 | 5–4 | 1–1 | 6–2 | 8–2 | 3 / 55 | 66–53 | 55% |
| Grass win–loss | 0–0 | 0–0 | 0–0 | 0–0 | 0–0 | 0–1 | 0–1 | 0–2 | 7–3 | 0–4 | 8–2 | 6–4 | 0–0 | 0–2 | 5–3 | 1–2 | 12–3 | 3–2 | 5–1 | 3 / 32 | 42–29 | 59% |
| Carpet win–loss | 0–0 | 0–0 | 0–0 | 0–0 | 2–1 | 0–1 | 0–1 | 0–0 | 0–0 | 0–0 | 0–0 | 0–0 | 0–0 | 0–0 | 0–0 | 0–0 | 0–0 | 0–0 | 0–0 | 0 / 3 | 2–3 | 40% |
| Overall win–loss | 0–1 | 0–0 | 0–0 | 0–1 | 3–2 | 12–11 | 12–19 | 18–25 | 25–27 | 37–25 | 36–18 | 40–25 | 20–11 | 31–18 | 36–16 | 35–18 | 40–15 | 28–15 | 52–12 | 14 / 239 | 308–215 | 59% |
| Win % | 31% | 43% | 60% | 51% | 65% | 62% | 55% | 41% | 52% | 60% | 67% | 62% | 65% | 63% | 69% | 66% | 65% | 80% | 80% | Career total: | | |
| Year-end ranking | 371 | 580 | 321 | 224 | 138 | 65 | 58 | 48 | 39 | 18 | 10 | 8 | 10 | 7 | 7 | 8 | 3 | 10 | | $5,717,856 | | |

Notes

- ^{^{1}} The first Premier 5 event of the year has switched back and forth between the Dubai Tennis Championships and the Qatar Ladies Open from 2009 until 2024. Dubai was classified as a Premier 5 event from 2009 to 2011 before being succeeded by Doha for the 2012–2014 period. Since 2015, the two tournaments alternate between Premier 5 and Premier status every year.
- ^{^{2}} In 2014, the Pan Pacific Open was downgraded to a Premier event and replaced by the Wuhan Open.

=== Mixed doubles ===
Current through the 2025 US Open.

| Tournament | 2015 | 2016 | 2017 | 2018 | 2019 | 2020 | 2021 | 2022 | 2023 | 2024 | 2025 | 2026 | SR | W–L | Win % |
|---|---|---|---|---|---|---|---|---|---|---|---|---|---|---|---|
| Australian Open | A | A | QF | W | QF | SF | QF | 1R | 2R | QF | 1R | 1R | 1 / 10 | 17–9 | 65% |
| French Open | A | A | W | F | F | NH | 1R | SF | SF | A | A | F | 1 / 7 | 21–6 | 78% |
| Wimbledon | 1R | 3R | QF | 3R | 3R | NH | QF | QF | 1R | 1R | 1R | | 0 / 10 | 9–10 | 47% |
| US Open | A | QF | QF | 2R | QF | NH | 2R | 2R | 1R | 1R | A | | 0 / 8 | 9–8 | 53% |
| Win–loss | 0–1 | 4–2 | 11–3 | 10–3 | 9–4 | 3–1 | 5–4 | 6–4 | 3–4 | 2–3 | 0–2 | 3–2 | 2 / 33 | 56–33 | 63% |

== Team competition ==
=== BJK Cup finals ===
| Result | Date | Tournament | Surface | Team | Partners | Opponent team | Opponent players | Score |
|---|---|---|---|---|---|---|---|---|
| Win | Nov 2023 | Billie Jean King Cup | Hard (i) | Canada | Leylah Fernandez; Marina Stakusic; Eugenie Bouchard; Rebecca Marino | Italy | Jasmine Paolini; Martina Trevisan; Elisabetta Cocciaretto; Lucia Bronzetti; Lucrezia Stefanini | 2–0 |

== ITF Circuit finals ==
=== Singles: 6 (2 titles, 4 runner-ups) ===
Legend
$50,000 tournaments (1–3)
$25,000 tournaments (1–1)

| Result | W–L | Date | Tournament | Tier | Surface | Opponent | Score |
|---|---|---|---|---|---|---|---|
| Loss | 0–1 | Nov 2011 | Toronto Challenger, Canada | 50,000 | Hard (i) | (Switzerland) Amra Sadiković | 4–6, 2–6 |
| Loss | 0–2 | Jul 2013 | Waterloo Challenger, Canada | 50,000 | Clay | (Israel) Julia Glushko | 1–6, 3–6 |
| Loss | 0–3 | Nov 2013 | South Seas Island Pro Classic, United States | 50,000 | Hard | (Luxembourg) Mandy Minella | 3–6, 3–6 |
| Loss | 0–4 | Jan 2014 | ITF Vero Beach, United States | 25,000 | Clay | (Germany) Laura Siegemund | 3–6, 6–7^{(10)} |
| Win | 1–4 | Nov 2014 | Toronto Challenger, Canada | 50,000 | Hard (i) | (United States) Maria Sanchez | 6–4, 2–6, 7–6^{(7)} |
| Win | 2–4 | Nov 2016 | ITF Nashville, United States | 25,000 | Hard (i) | (United States) Jennifer Elie | 7–6^{(6)}, 6–4 |

=== Doubles: 20 (12 titles, 8 runner-ups) ===
Legend
$75,000 tournaments (0–1)
$50,000 tournaments (9–4)
$25,000 tournaments (3–2)
$10,000 tournaments (0–1)

| Result | W–L | Date | Tournament | Tier | Surface | Partner | Opponents | Score |
|---|---|---|---|---|---|---|---|---|
| Win | 1–0 | Nov 2007 | Toronto Challenger, Canada | 25,000 | Hard (i) | (Canada) Sharon Fichman | (Brazil) Maria Fernanda Alves (Australia) Christina Wheeler | 6–3, 6–0 |
| Loss | 1–1 | Oct 2008 | Challenger de Saguenay, Canada | 50,000 | Hard (i) | (Canada) Sharon Fichman | (Hungary) Katalin Marosi (Brazil) Marina Tavares | 6–2, 4–6, [4–10] |
| Loss | 1–2 | Jun 2010 | ITF Bratislava, Slovakia | 25,000 | Clay | (Slovakia) Chantal Škamlová | (Slovakia) Katarína Kachlíková (Slovakia) Lenka Tvarošková | 4–6, 6–7^{(2)} |
| Win | 2–2 | Nov 2010 | Toronto Challenger, Canada | 50,000 | Hard (i) | (Canada) Sharon Fichman | (United States) Brittany Augustine (United States) Alexandra Mueller | 6–4, 6–0 |
| Loss | 2–3 | Jan 2011 | ITF Lutz, United States | 25,000 | Clay | (Canada) Sharon Fichman | (United States) Ahsha Rolle (United States) Mashona Washington | 4–6, 4–6 |
| Loss | 2–4 | Oct 2011 | Challenger de Saguenay, Canada | 50,000 | Hard (i) | (Canada) Marie-Ève Pelletier | (Hungary) Tímea Babos (United States) Jessica Pegula | 4–6, 3–6 |
| Win | 3–4 | Nov 2011 | Toronto Challenger, Canada | 50,000 | Hard (i) | (Canada) Marie-Ève Pelletier | (Hungary) Tímea Babos (United States) Jessica Pegula | 7–5, 6–7^{(5)}, [10–4] |
| Win | 4–4 | May 2012 | ITF Raleigh, United States | 25,000 | Clay | (Canada) Marie-Ève Pelletier | (United States) Alexandra Mueller (United States) Asia Muhammad | 6–4, 4–6, [10–5] |
| Loss | 4–5 | May 2012 | ITF Landisville, US | 10,000 | Hard | (United States) Alexandra Mueller | (United States) Macall Harkins (United States) Hsu Chieh-yu | 3–6, 4–6 |
| Loss | 4–6 | Jul 2012 | Waterloo Challenger, Canada | 50,000 | Clay | (Japan) Shuko Aoyama | (Canada) Sharon Fichman (Canada) Marie-Ève Pelletier | 2–6, 5–7 |
| Win | 5–6 | Oct 2012 | Challenger de Saguenay, Canada | 50,000 | Hard (i) | (Russia) Alla Kudryavtseva | (Canada) Sharon Fichman (Canada) Marie-Ève Pelletier | 6–2, 6–2 |
| Win | 6–6 | Nov 2012 | Toronto Challenger, Canada | 50,000 | Hard (i) | (Russia) Alla Kudryavtseva | (Canada) Eugenie Bouchard (United States) Jessica Pegula | 6–2, 7–6^{(2)} |
| Win | 7–6 | May 2013 | Wiesbaden Open, Germany | 25,000 | Clay | (Canada) Sharon Fichman | (Germany) Dinah Pfizenmaier (Germany) Anna Zaja | 6–3, 6–3 |
| Loss | 7–7 | Jun 2013 | Nottingham Trophy, UK | 75,000 | Grass | (Canada) Sharon Fichman | (United States) Maria Sanchez (United Kingdom) Nicola Slater | 6–4, 3–6, [8–10] |
| Win | 8–7 | Jul 2013 | Waterloo Challenger, Canada | 50,000 | Clay | (Canada) Sharon Fichman | (Japan) Misa Eguchi (Japan) Eri Hozumi | 7–6^{(6)}, 6–3 |
| Win | 9–7 | Nov 2013 | S.S.I. Pro Classic, United States | 50,000 | Hard | (United States) Allie Will | (United States) Julia Boserup (United States) Alexandra Mueller | 6–1, 6–2 |
| Win | 10–7 | Jul 2014 | Reinert Open, Germany | 50,000 | Clay | (Colombia) Mariana Duque Mariño | (Paraguay) Verónica Cepede Royg (Liechtenstein) Stephanie Vogt | 6–4, 6–2 |
| Loss | 10–8 | Oct 2014 | Toronto Challenger, Canada | 50,000 | Hard (i) | (Germany) Tatjana Maria | (United States) Maria Sanchez (United States) Taylor Townsend | 5–7, 6–4, [13–15] |
| Win | 11–8 | Nov 2014 | ITF Captiva Island, US | 50,000 | Hard | (United States) Anna Tatishvili | (United States) Asia Muhammad (United States) Maria Sanchez | 6–3, 6–3 |
| Win | 12–8 | Nov 2016 | Toronto Challenger, Canada | 50,000 | Hard (i) | (Netherlands) Michaëlla Krajicek | (United States) Ashley Weinhold (United States) Caitlin Whoriskey | 6–4, 6–3 |

== Junior Grand Slam tournament finals ==
=== Doubles: 1 (runner-up) ===
| Result | Year | Tournament | Surface | Partner | Opponents | Score |
|---|---|---|---|---|---|---|
| Loss | 2010 | Australian Open | Hard | (Hungary) Tímea Babos | (Slovakia) Jana Čepelová (Slovakia) Chantal Škamlová | 6–7^{(1–7)}, 2–6 |

== Head-to-head record ==
=== Record against top-100 players ===
Dabrowski's win–loss record (9–32) against players who were ranked world No. 100 or higher when played is as follows:
Players who have been ranked world No. 1 are in boldface.

- (Australia) Alicia Molik 1–0
- (Germany) Julia Görges 1–0
- (Croatia) Mirjana Lučić-Baroni 1–0 (Note: has a 1–2 overall record vs. Lučić-Baroni)
- (Luxembourg) Mandy Minella 1–0 (Note: has a 1–1 overall record vs. Minella)
- (Japan) Nao Hibino 1–0
- (Russia) Irina Khromacheva 1–0
- **(Czech Republic) Karolína Plíšková** 1–1
- (Italy) Camila Giorgi 1–1 (Note: has a 1–2 overall record vs. Giorgi)
- (Slovakia) Jana Čepelová 1–1
- **(Spain) Garbiñe Muguruza** 0–1
- **(Denmark) Caroline Wozniacki** 0–1
- (Japan) Kimiko Date-Krumm 0–1
- (Italy) Francesca Schiavone 0–1
- (Italy) Flavia Pennetta 0–1
- (Brazil) Beatriz Haddad Maia 0–1
- (United Kingdom) Johanna Konta 0–1 (Note: has a 0–2 overall record vs. Konta)
- (France) Alizé Cornet 0–1
- (Belgium) Yanina Wickmayer 0–1
- (Russia) Elena Vesnina 0–1
- (United States) CoCo Vandeweghe 0–1 (Note: has a 0–2 overall record vs. Vandeweghe)
- (United States) Varvara Lepchenko 0–1
- (Germany) Mona Barthel 0–1
- (United States) Jamie Hampton 0–1
- (Romania) Alexandra Dulgheru 0–1
- (Slovakia) Anna Karolína Schmiedlová 0–1
- (Romania) Monica Niculescu 0–1
- (Ukraine) Kateryna Bondarenko 0–1 (Note: has a 0–2 overall record vs. Bondarenko)
- (Japan) Misaki Doi 0–1
- (Kazakhstan) Zarina Diyas 0–1
- (Germany) Martina Müller 0–1
- (Ukraine) Lesia Tsurenko 0–1
- (France) Pauline Parmentier 0–1
- (France) Océane Dodin 0–1
- (Czech Republic) Denisa Allertová 0–1
- (United States) Irina Falconi 0–1 (Note: has a 2–2 overall record vs. Falconi)
- (Russia) Evgeniya Rodina 0–1
- (Russia) Ekaterina Alexandrova 0–1 (Note: has a 1–1 overall record vs. Alexandrova)
- (Czech Republic) Tereza Smitková 0–2 (Note: has a 1–2 overall record vs. Smitková)

* statistics as of 17 January 2021

=== Wins over top-10 players ===
==== Doubles ====
| Season | 2013 | 2014 | 2015 | 2016 | 2017 | 2018 | 2019 | 2020 | 2021 | 2022 | 2023 | 2024 | 2025 | Total |
|---|---|---|---|---|---|---|---|---|---|---|---|---|---|---|
| Wins | 2 | 0 | 3 | 1 | 5 | 5 | 7 | 0 | 0 | 0 | 0 | 0 | 0 | **23** |

Players that were in the top 10 in that moment are in boldface.

| # | Partner | Opponents | Rank | Event | Surface | Rd | Score | GDR |
|---|---|---|---|---|---|---|---|---|
**2013**
| 1. | (Russia) Alla Kudryavtseva | **(Czech Republic) Andrea Hlaváčková** **(Czech Republic) Lucie Hradecká** | No. 4 No. 5 | Memphis, United States | Hard (i) | 1R | 4–6, 6–4, [10–4] | No. 145 |
| 2. | (Canada) Sharon Fichman | **(Italy) Sara Errani** **(Italy) Roberta Vinci** | No. 1 No. 1 | Toronto, Canada | Hard | QF | 6–7^{(4)}, 6–2, [10–5] | No. 88 |
**2015**
| 3. | (Poland) Alicja Rosolska | **(Zimbabwe) Cara Black** (China) Zheng Saisai | No. 4 No. 83 | Australian Open | Hard | 1R | 6–1, 6–4 | No. 60 |
| 4. | (Poland) Alicja Rosolska | **(Chinese Taipei) Hsieh Su-wei** **(India) Sania Mirza** | No. 6 No. 5 | Australian Open | Hard | 2R | 7–6^{(5)}, 6–4 | No. 60 |
| 5. | (Poland) Alicja Rosolska | (Hungary) Tímea Babos **(France) Kristina Mladenovic** | No. 11; No. 8 | Wuhan, China | Hard | 2R | 7–6^{(7)}, 4–6, [10–5] | No. 55 |
**2016**
| 6. | (Spain) María José Martínez Sánchez | **(India) Sania Mirza** (Czech Republic) Barbora Strýcová | No. 1 No. 16 | Beijing, China | Hard | 2R | 4–6, 6–1, [10–4] | No. 42 |
**2017**
| 7. | (Netherlands) Michaëlla Krajicek | (Switzerland) Belinda Bencic **(Switzerland) Martina Hingis** | No. 468; No. 8 | St. Petersburg, Russia | Hard (i) | 1R | 6–4, 4–6, [10–3] | No. 34 |
| 8. | (Croatia) Darija Jurak | (Ukraine) Kateryna Volodko **(Russia) Elena Vesnina** | No. 62; No. 5 | Doha, Qatar | Hard | 1R | 6–1, 3–6, [12–10] | No. 31 |
| 9. | (China) Xu Yifan | **(Russia) Ekaterina Makarova** **(Russia) Elena Vesnina** | No. 5 No. 5 | Miami, United States | Hard | QF | 7–6^{(3)}, 6–1 | No. 34 |
| 10. | (China) Xu Yifan | **(Czech Republic) Andrea Hlaváčková** (China) Peng Shuai | No. 9 No. 14 | Miami, United States | Hard | SF | 7–5, 5–7, [10–7] | No. 34 |
| 11. | (China) Xu Yifan | **(India) Sania Mirza** **(Czech Republic) Barbora Strýcová** | No. 7 No. 10 | Miami, United States | Hard | F | 6–4, 6–3 | No. 34 |
**2018**
| - | (China) Xu Yifan | **(Czech Republic) Lucie Šafářová** (Czech Republic) Barbora Strýcová | No. 6 No. 15 | Sydney, Australia | Hard | SF | walkover | No. 18 |
| 12. | (China) Xu Yifan | **(Chinese Taipei) Latisha Chan** **(Czech Republic) Andrea Sestini Hlaváčková** | No. 1 No. 5 | Sydney, Australia | Hard | F | 6–3, 6–1 | No. 18 |
| 13. | (Latvia) Jeļena Ostapenko | **(Czech Republic) Lucie Šafářová** (Czech Republic) Barbora Strýcová | No. 7 No. 15 | Doha, Qatar | Hard | 2R | 3–0 ret. | No. 11 |
| 14. | (Latvia) Jeļena Ostapenko | (Czech Republic) Barbora Krejčíková **(Czech Republic) Kateřina Siniaková** | No. 43; No. 8 | Doha, Qatar | Hard | SF | 6–3, 6–3 | No. 11 |
| 15. | (China) Xu Yifan | **(Hungary) Tímea Babos** (United Kingdom) Johanna Konta | No. 4 No. 204 | Eastbourne, United Kingdom | Grass | QF | 6–4, 6–4 | No. 10 |
| 16. | (China) Xu Yifan | (Czech Republic) Lucie Hradecká **(Russia) Ekaterina Makarova** | No. 38; No. 4 | Beijing, China | Hard | SF | 6–3, 6–2 | No. 11 |
**2019**
| 17. | (Canada) Rebecca Marino | (Netherlands) Bibiane Schoofs **(Netherlands) Demi Schuurs** | No. 141; No. 7 | Fed Cup, Netherlands | Clay (i) | PO | 2–6, 7–5, [12–10] | No. 10 |
| 18. | (Latvia) Jeļena Ostapenko | (Germany) Anna-Lena Grönefeld **(Netherlands) Demi Schuurs** | No. 26; No. 7 | Stuttgart, Germany | Clay (i) | 1R | 6–1, 6–2 | No. 15 |
| 19. | (China) Xu Yifan | **(Czech Republic) Barbora Krejčíková** **(Czech Republic) Kateřina Siniaková** | No. 2 No. 1 | Madrid, Spain | Clay | QF | 3–6, 7–6^{(7)}, [10–7] | No. 15 |
| 20. | (China) Xu Yifan | (France) Caroline Garcia **(China) Zhang Shuai** | No. 895; No. 9 | Nottingham, United Kingdom | Grass | 1R | 6–2, 6–2 | No. 10 |
| 21. | (China) Xu Yifan | **(Czech Republic) Barbora Krejčíková** **(Czech Republic) Kateřina Siniaková** | No. 6 No. 4 | Wimbledon, United Kingdom | Grass | SF | 6–1, 3–6, 6–3 | No. 13 |
| 22. | (China) Xu Yifan | **(Hungary) Tímea Babos** (Estonia) Anett Kontaveit | No. 3 No. 187 | Toronto, Canada | Hard | QF | 6–7^{(0)}, 7–6^{(5)}, [10–3] | No. 10 |
| 23. | (China) Xu Yifan | **(Chinese Taipei) Hsieh Su-wei** **(Czech Republic) Barbora Strýcová** | No. 4 No. 1 | WTA Finals, China | Hard (i) | RR | 2–6, 6–4, [11–9] | No. 8 |

== Notes ==
Sporting positions
| Preceded by (United States) Julia Boserup | Orange Bowl Girls' Singles Champion; Category: 18 and under 2009 | Succeeded by (United States) Lauren Davis |
