= 2024 Wuhan Open =

- Date: October 7–13
- Edition: 7th
- Category: WTA 1000
- Draw: 56S / 28D
- Prize money: $3,221,715
- Surface: Hard / outdoor
- Location: Wuhan, China
- Venue: Optics Valley Int'l Tennis Center

Champions

Singles
- Aryna Sabalenka

Doubles
- (Kazakhstan) Anna Danilina / Irina Khromacheva
| ← 2019 · | Wuhan Open | · 2025 → |

The 2024 Wuhan Open (also known as Dongfeng Voyah Wuhan Open for sponsorship reasons) was a women's tennis tournament played on outdoor hard courts between October 7–13, 2024. It was the 7th edition of the Wuhan Open, and part of the WTA 1000 tournaments of the 2024 WTA Tour. It was the first edition of the tournament since 2019, with the intervening editions cancelled due to the COVID-19 pandemic. The tournament was held at the Optics Valley International Tennis Center in Wuhan, China.

== Points and prize money ==
=== Point distribution ===
| Event | W | F | SF | QF | Round of 16 | Round of 32 | Round of 64 | Q | Q2 | Q1 |
| Singles | 1000 | 650 | 390 | 215 | 120 | 65 | 10 | 30 | 20 | 2 |
| Doubles | 1000 | 650 | 390 | 215 | 120 | 10 | — | — | — | — |

=== Prize money ===
| Event | W | F | SF | QF | Round of 16 | Round of 32 | Round of 64 | Q2 | Q1 |
| Singles | $525,115 | $309,280 | $159,439 | $73,193 | $36,568 | $20,714 | $14,846 | $8,828 | $4,624 |
| Doubles | $154,640 | $86,980 | $46,715 | $24,165 | $13,693 | $9,128 | — | — | — |

== Champions ==
=== Singles ===
- Aryna Sabalenka def. (China) Zheng Qinwen 6–3, 5–7, 6–3

=== Doubles ===
- (Kazakhstan) Anna Danilina / Irina Khromacheva def. (United States) Asia Muhammad / (United States) Jessica Pegula 6–3, 7–6^{(8–6)}

== Doubles main-draw entrants ==
=== Seeds ===
| Country | Player | Country | Player | Rank^{1} | Seed |
|---|---|---|---|---|---|
| CAN | Gabriela Dabrowski | NZL | Erin Routliffe | 6 | 1 |
| USA | Nicole Melichar-Martinez | AUS | Ellen Perez | 21 | 2 |
| USA | Caroline Dolehide | USA | Desirae Krawczyk | 22 | 3 |
| ITA | Sara Errani | ITA | Jasmine Paolini | 28 | 4 |
| BEL | Elise Mertens | CHN | Zhang Shuai | 36 | 5 |
| TPE | Chan Hao-ching | | Veronika Kudermetova | 40 | 6 |
| NED | Demi Schuurs | BRA | Luisa Stefani | 45 | 7 |
| USA | Sofia Kenin | USA | Bethanie Mattek-Sands | 47 | 8 |

- Rankings are as of September 23, 2024

=== Other entrants ===
The following pairs received wildcards into the doubles main draw:

- (Romania) Jaqueline Cristian / Kamilla Rakhimova
- (China) Tang Qianhui / (China) Wang Xiyu

=== Alternates ===
- (Armenia) Elina Avanesyan / (Australia) Olivia Gadecki

=== Withdrawals ===
- (United Kingdom) Harriet Dart / (United States) Ashlyn Krueger → replaced by (Armenia) Elina Avanesyan / (Australia) Olivia Gadecki
