= 2025 Wuhan Open =

- Date: October 6–12
- Edition: 8th
- Category: WTA 1000
- Draw: 56S / 28D
- Prize money: $3,654,963
- Surface: Hard / outdoor
- Location: Wuhan, China
- Venue: Optics Valley Int'l Tennis Center

Champions

Singles
- (United States) Coco Gauff

Doubles
- (Australia) Storm Hunter / (Czech Republic) Kateřina Siniaková
- Wuhan Open

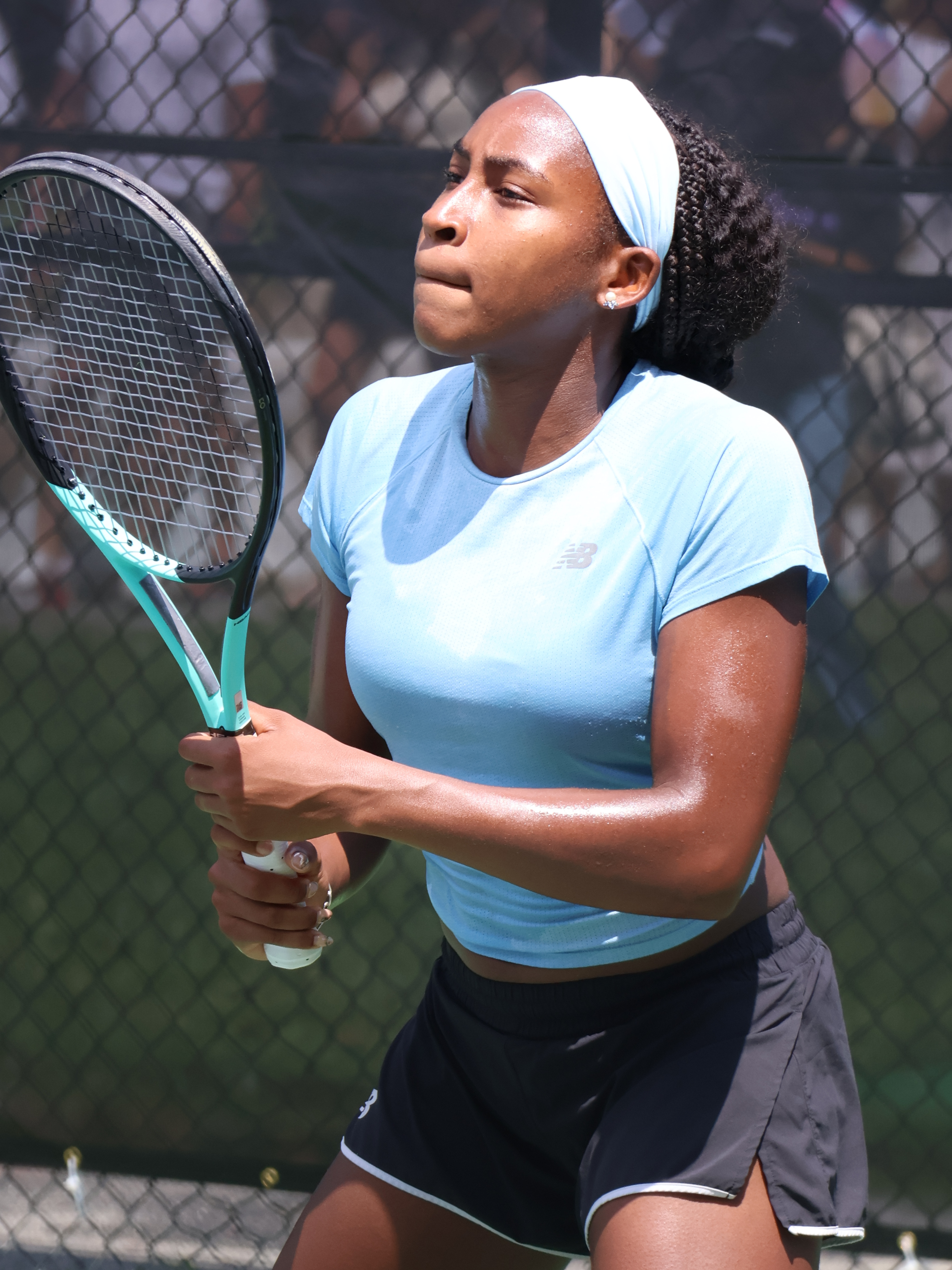

The 2025 Wuhan Open (also known as Dongfeng Voyah Wuhan Open for sponsorship reasons) was a women's tennis tournament played on outdoor hard courts between October 6–12, 2025. It was the eighth edition of the Wuhan Open, and part of the WTA 1000 tournaments of the 2025 WTA Tour. The tournament was held at the Optics Valley International Tennis Center in Wuhan, China.

== Point distribution ==
Event	W	F	SF	QF	Round of 16	Round of 32	Round of 64	Q	Q2	Q1
Singles	1000	650	390	215	120	65	10	30	20	2
Doubles	1000	650	390	215	120	10	—N/a	—N/a	—N/a	—N/a

== Prize money ==
Event	W	F	SF	QF	Round of 16	Round of 32	Round of 64	Q2	Q1
Singles	$596,000	$351,003	$180,100	$83,250	$41,500	$23,450	$16,860	$10,050	$5,260
Doubles	$175,420	$98,700	$53,000	$27,420	$15,530	$10,360	—N/a	—N/a	—N/a

== Champions ==
=== Singles ===
- (United States) Coco Gauff def. (United States) Jessica Pegula, 6–4, 7–5

=== Doubles ===
- (Australia) Storm Hunter / (Czech Republic) Kateřina Siniaková def. (Kazakhstan) Anna Danilina / (Serbia) Aleksandra Krunić, 6–3, 6–2
