= 2024 Wuhan Open – Singles =

Singles
- 2024 Wuhan Open

Final
- Champion: Aryna Sabalenka
- Runner-up: (China) Zheng Qinwen
- Score: 6–3, 5–7, 6–3

Details
- Draw: 56 (8 Q / 4 WC )
- Seeds: 16

Events
Singles	Doubles
← 2019 ·	Wuhan Open	· 2025 →

Two-time defending champion Aryna Sabalenka defeated Zheng Qinwen in the final, 6–3, 5–7, 6–3 to win the singles tennis title at the 2024 Wuhan Open. Sabalenka became the first player to win three consecutive titles at the Wuhan Open, and extended her unbeaten win streak at the tournament to 17 matches dating back to her tournament debut in 2018. The final was a rematch of the 2024 Australian Open final, which Sabalenka also won. One week later, on 21 October 2024, Sabalenka reclaimed the WTA No. 1 singles ranking from Iga Świątek, who lost her fourth round points from Miami earlier this year.

Zheng became the first Chinese finalist in the tournament's history, and the semifinal between Zheng and Wang Xinyu was the first all-Chinese semifinal at a WTA 1000 event.

== Seeds ==
The top eight seeds received a bye into the second round.

1. Aryna Sabalenka (champion)
2. (United States) Jessica Pegula (third round)
3. (Italy) Jasmine Paolini (quarterfinals)
4. (United States) Coco Gauff (semifinals)
5. (China) Zheng Qinwen (final)
6. (United States) Emma Navarro (second round)
7. (Czech Republic) Barbora Krejčíková (second round)
8. Daria Kasatkina (third round)
9. (Brazil) Beatriz Haddad Maia (third round)
10. Anna Kalinskaya (second round)
11. Liudmila Samsonova (first round)
12. Diana Shnaider (first round)
13. (Ukraine) Marta Kostyuk (third round)
14. (Spain) Paula Badosa (withdrew)
15. (Croatia) Donna Vekić (second round)
16. Mirra Andreeva (second round)

Click on the seed number of a player to go to their draw section.

== Draw ==
=== Key ===
- Q = Qualifier
- WC = Wild card
- LL = Lucky loser
- Alt = Alternate
- ITF = ITF entry
- PR = Protected ranking
- SR = Special ranking
- SE = Special exempt
- JE = Junior exempt
- JR = Junior Accelerator Programme entrant
- CO = College Accelerator Programme entrant
- NG = Next Gen Accelerator Program entrant
- w/o = Walkover
- r = Retired
- d = Defaulted

=== Finals ===
Quarterfinals
1	Aryna Sabalenka	6	6
(Poland) Magdalena Fręch	2	2
4	(United States) Coco Gauff	6	6
(Poland) Magda Linette	0	4
5	(China) Zheng Qinwen	6	3	6
3	(Italy) Jasmine Paolini	2	6	3
Ekaterina Alexandrova	6	5	6^{6}
(China) Wang Xinyu	4	7	7^{8}

Semifinals
1	Aryna Sabalenka	1	6	6
4	(United States) Coco Gauff	6	4	4
5	(China) Zheng Qinwen	6	6
(China) Wang Xinyu	3	4

Final
1	Aryna Sabalenka	6	5	6
5	(China) Zheng Qinwen	3	7	3

=== Top half ===
==== Section 1 ====
First round
WC	(Philippines) A Eala	3	1
(Czech Republic) K Siniaková	6	6
(Kazakhstan) Y Putintseva	6	6
PR	(China) S Zhang	4	4
(Belgium) E Mertens	6	1	3
15	(Croatia) D Vekić	3	6	6
9	(Brazil) B Haddad Maia	7^{9}	6
(United States) M Keys	6^{7}	2
(Czech Republic) M Bouzková	4	6^{4}
V Kudermetova	6	7^{7}
Q	(Japan) M Hontama	0	4
(Poland) M Fręch	6	6

Second round
1	A Sabalenka	6	6
(Czech Republic) K Siniaková	4	4
(Kazakhstan) Y Putintseva	6	3	6
15	(Croatia) D Vekić	4	6	4
9	(Brazil) B Haddad Maia	6	6
V Kudermetova	1	4
(Poland) M Fręch	6	3	6
6	(United States) E Navarro	4	6	3

Third round
1	A Sabalenka	1	6	6
(Kazakhstan) Y Putintseva	6	4	0
9	(Brazil) B Haddad Maia	3	2
(Poland) M Fręch	6	6

Quarterfinals
1	A Sabalenka	6	6
(Poland) M Fręch	2	2

==== Section 2 ====
First round
(United States) A Krueger	6	6^{8}	5
(Bulgaria) V Tomova	1	7^{10}	7
(United States) A Anisimova	6	6
Q	(Spain) C Bucșa	2	4
(Armenia) E Avanesyan	6	5	6^{2}
13	(Ukraine) M Kostyuk	4	7	7^{7}
11	L Samsonova	2	2
(Poland) M Linette	6	6
Q	(Ukraine) L Tsurenko	6	7
(United Kingdom) K Boulter	2	5
Q	(United States) B Pera	6	4	6
PR	(Romania) I-C Begu	2	6	2

Second round
4	(United States) C Gauff	6	6
(Bulgaria) V Tomova	1	2
(United States) A Anisimova
13	(Ukraine) M Kostyuk	w/o
(Poland) M Linette	5
Q	(Ukraine) L Tsurenko	2^{r}
Q	(United States) B Pera	4	6	1
8	D Kasatkina	6	1	6

Third round
4	(United States) C Gauff	6	6
13	(Ukraine) M Kostyuk	4	1
(Poland) M Linette	6	6
8	D Kasatkina	2	3

Quarterfinals
4	(United States) C Gauff	6	6
(Poland) M Linette	0	4

=== Bottom half ===
==== Section 3 ====
First round
Q	(Colombia) C Osorio	6	2	3
WC	(Romania) J Cristian	4	6	6
LL	K Rakhimova	6	6
Q	(Japan) M Uchijima	1	2
(Canada) L Fernandez	6^{7}	6	6
12	D Shnaider	7^{9}	3	3
16	M Andreeva	7^{7}	6
WC	(China) Xiy Wang	6^{5}	3
(Ukraine) D Yastremska	5	4
LL	E Andreeva	7	6
(China) Y Yuan	1	6	6
LL	(France) C Burel	6	4	2

Second round
5	(China) Q Zheng	6	6
WC	(Romania) J Cristian	2	4
LL	K Rakhimova	2	7	6^{4}
(Canada) L Fernandez	6	5	7^{7}
16	M Andreeva	3	1
LL	E Andreeva	6	6
(China) Y Yuan	4	3
3	(Italy) J Paolini	6	6

Third round
5	(China) Q Zheng	5	6	6
(Canada) L Fernandez	7	3	0
LL	E Andreeva	3	2
3	(Italy) J Paolini	6	6

Quarterfinals
5	(China) Q Zheng	6	3	6
3	(Italy) J Paolini	2	6	3

==== Section 4 ====
First round
(France) D Parry	4	5
Q	(United States) H Baptiste	6	7
(United States) S Kenin	1	6	4
E Alexandrova	6	4	6
Q	(Hungary) A Bondár	1	3
10	A Kalinskaya	6	6
LL	(Italy) L Bronzetti	6	7^{7}
PR	(Australia) A Tomljanović	1	6^{2}
(China) Xin Wang	6	6
(United States) C Dolehide	4	0
A Potapova	5	6	7
WC	(United States) K Volynets	7	3	5

Second round
7	(Czech Republic) B Krejčíková	3	5
Q	(United States) H Baptiste	6	7
E Alexandrova	6	6^{2}	6
10	A Kalinskaya	4	7^{7}	1
LL	(Italy) L Bronzetti	6	2	4
(China) Xin Wang	4	6	6
A Potapova	2	0^{r}
2	(United States) J Pegula	6	2

Third round
Q	(United States) H Baptiste	1	1
E Alexandrova	6	6
(China) Xin Wang	6	7
2	(United States) J Pegula	3	5

Quarterfinals
E Alexandrova	6	5	6^{6}
(China) Xin Wang	4	7	7^{8}

== Seeded players ==
The following are the seeded players based on WTA rankings as of 23 September 2024. Rankings and points before are as of 7 October 2024.

Under the 2024 Rulebook, points from one of the three non-combined WTA 1000 tournaments (which include Wuhan) are required to be counted in a player's ranking.

Because the tournament was not held in 2023, the points dropping column reflects (a) the points from the tournaments held during the week of 9 October 2023 (Zhengzhou, Seoul and Hong Kong), (b) the points from a non-combined WTA 1000 tournament or (c) the player's best 18th result. The points won column reflects (a) the points of the 2024 tournament, (b) the player's 18th best result or (c) the player's 19th best result.

Seed	Rank	Player	Points before	Points dropping	Points won	Points after	Status
1	2	Aryna Sabalenka	8,716	0	1,000	9,716	Champion, defeated (China) Zheng Qinwen [5]
2	3	(United States) Jessica Pegula	5,945	280	120	5,785	Third round lost to (China) Wang Xinyu
3	6	(Italy) Jasmine Paolini	5,293	185	215	5,323	Quarterfinals lost to (China) Zheng Qinwen [5]
4	4	(United States) Coco Gauff	5,593	0	390	5,983	Semifinals lost to Aryna Sabalenka [1]
5	7	(China) Zheng Qinwen	4,300	470	650	4,480	Runner-up, lost to Aryna Sabalenka [1]
6	8	(United States) Emma Navarro	3,698	(98)^{‡}	(98)^{§}	3,698	Second round lost to (Poland) Magdalena Fręch
7	10	(Czech Republic) Barbora Krejčíková	3,161	305	10	2,866	Second round lost to (United States) Hailey Baptiste [Q]
8	11	Daria Kasatkina	3,075	(10)^{†}	120	3,185	Third round lost to (Poland) Magda Linette
9	12	(Brazil) Beatriz Haddad Maia	3,036	(10)^{†}	120	3,146	Third round lost to (Poland) Magdalena Fręch
10	13	Anna Kalinskaya	2,825	(13)^{‡}	65	2,877	Second round lost to Ekaterina Alexandrova
11	23	Liudmila Samsonova	2,080	55	10	2,035	First round lost to (Poland) Magda Linette
12	16	Diana Shnaider	2,641	(30)^{†}	(30)^{§}	2,641	First round lost to (Canada) Leylah Fernandez
13	17	(Ukraine) Marta Kostyuk	2,383	(32)^{‡}	120	2,471	Third round lost to (United States) Coco Gauff [4]
14	15	(Spain) Paula Badosa	2,714	(1)^{‡}	0	2,713	Withdrew due to gastroenteritis
15	18	(Croatia) Donna Vekić	2,298	55	65	2,308	Second round lost to (Kazakhstan) Yulia Putintseva
16	19	Mirra Andreeva	2,218	30	65	2,253	Second round lost to Erika Andreeva [LL]

† The player is defending points from a non-combined WTA 1000 tournament.
‡ The player is defending points from her 18th best result.
§ The player is keeping her 18th best result as it is higher than the Wuhan result which does not need to count in her rankings.

=== Withdrawn seeded players ===
The following players would have been seeded, but withdrew before the tournament began.

Rank	Player	Points before	Points dropping	Points after	Withdrawal reason
1	(Poland) Iga Świątek	9,785	0	9,785	Seeking new coach
5	(Kazakhstan) Elena Rybakina	5,481	108	5,373	Back injury
9	(United States) Danielle Collins	3,177	1	3,176	Illness
14	(Latvia) Jeļena Ostapenko	2,748	60	2,688	Abdominal injury
22	(Greece) Maria Sakkari	2,118	1	2,117	Shoulder injury
28	(Tunisia) Ons Jabeur	1,826	100	1,726	Shoulder injury

== Other entry information ==
=== Wildcards ===
- (Romania) Jaqueline Cristian
- (Philippines) Alexandra Eala
- (United States) Katie Volynets
- (China) Wang Xiyu

=== Protected ranking ===
- (Romania) Irina-Camelia Begu
- (Australia) Ajla Tomljanović
- (China) Zhang Shuai

=== Withdrawals ===
- ‡ Victoria Azarenka → replaced by (China) Zhang Shuai
- § (Spain) Paula Badosa → replaced by (Italy) Lucia Bronzetti
- ‡ (United States) Danielle Collins → replaced by (United States) Ashlyn Krueger
- ‡ (France) Caroline Garcia → replaced by (Romania) Irina-Camelia Begu
- ‡ (Tunisia) Ons Jabeur → replaced by (United States) Amanda Anisimova
- § (Czech Republic) Karolína Muchová → replaced by Kamilla Rakhimova
- † (Czech Republic) Linda Nosková → replaced by (Poland) Magdalena Fręch
- ‡ (Latvia) Jeļena Ostapenko → replaced by (United States) Peyton Stearns
- ‡ Anastasia Pavlyuchenkova → replaced by (Armenia) Elina Avanesyan
- ‡ (Czech Republic) Karolína Plíšková → replaced by (China) Wang Xinyu
- ‡ (Kazakhstan) Elena Rybakina → replaced by (Bulgaria) Viktoriya Tomova
- ‡ (Greece) Maria Sakkari → replaced by (United States) Sofia Kenin
- § (United States) Peyton Stearns → replaced by (France) Clara Burel
- § (New Zealand) Lulu Sun → replaced by Erika Andreeva
- ‡ (Ukraine) Elina Svitolina → replaced by (Czech Republic) Marie Bouzková
- ‡ (Poland) Iga Świątek → replaced by (France) Diane Parry
- † (Czech Republic) Markéta Vondroušová → replaced by (United States) Caroline Dolehide

† – not included on entry list
‡ – withdrew from entry list
§ – withdrew from main draw

== Qualifying ==
=== Seeds ===
1. (France) Clara Burel (qualifying competition, lucky loser)
2. (China) Wang Yafan (first round)
3. (Colombia) Camila Osorio (qualified)
4. (Japan) Moyuka Uchijima (qualified)
5. (United States) McCartney Kessler (withdrew)
6. Erika Andreeva (qualifying competition, lucky loser)
7. (Germany) Laura Siegemund (first round)
8. Kamilla Rakhimova (qualifying competition, lucky loser)
9. (United Kingdom) Harriet Dart (first round, retired)
10. (Italy) Lucia Bronzetti (qualifying competition, lucky loser)
11. Anna Blinkova (withdrew, still playing in Hong Kong)
12. (Spain) Cristina Bucșa (qualified)
13. (Australia) Olivia Gadecki (qualifying competition)
14. (Ukraine) Lesia Tsurenko (qualified)
15. (Hungary) Anna Bondár (qualified)
16. (United States) Bernarda Pera (qualified)

=== Qualifiers ===
1. (Spain) Cristina Bucșa
2. (United States) Hailey Baptiste
3. (Colombia) Camila Osorio
4. (Japan) Moyuka Uchijima
5. (Japan) Mai Hontama
6. (Ukraine) Lesia Tsurenko
7. (Hungary) Anna Bondár
8. (United States) Bernarda Pera

=== Lucky losers ===
1. (France) Clara Burel
2. Erika Andreeva
3. Kamilla Rakhimova
4. (Italy) Lucia Bronzetti

=== Draw ===
==== First qualifier ====
First round
1	(France) Clara Burel	7	4	7^{8}
(United States) Alycia Parks	5	6	6^{6}
WC	(China) Shi Han	4	4
12	(Spain) Cristina Bucșa	6	6

Qualifying competition
1	(France) Clara Burel	2	0
12	(Spain) Cristina Bucșa	6	6

==== Second qualifier ====
First round
2	(China) Wang Yafan	3	4
(United States) Hailey Baptiste	6	6
(Netherlands) Suzan Lamens	6	6
Alt	(United States) Varvara Lepchenko	2	2

Qualifying competition
(United States) Hailey Baptiste	7^{8}	3	6
(Netherlands) Suzan Lamens	6^{6}	6	4

==== Third qualifier ====
First round
3	(Colombia) Camila Osorio	6	6
(Italy) Martina Trevisan	4	2
WC	(China) Ma Yexin	6	1	4
10	(Italy) Lucia Bronzetti	1	6	6

Qualifying competition
3	(Colombia) Camila Osorio	6	6
10	(Italy) Lucia Bronzetti	3	4

==== Fourth qualifier ====
First round
4	(Japan) Moyuka Uchijima	7	7^{7}
WC	(China) Gao Xinyu	5	6^{3}
WC	(China) Wei Sijia	7	3	4
13	(Australia) Olivia Gadecki	5	6	6

Qualifying competition
4	(Japan) Moyuka Uchijima	7	6
13	(Australia) Olivia Gadecki	5	4

==== Fifth qualifier ====
First round
Alt	(China) You Xiaodi	6	3	0
(Japan) Mai Hontama	3	6	6
(Romania) Ana Bogdan	6	0
9	(United Kingdom) Harriet Dart	0	0^{r}

Qualifying competition
(Japan) Mai Hontama	6	7^{7}
(Romania) Ana Bogdan	3	6^{3}

==== Sixth qualifier ====
First round
6	Erika Andreeva	6	4	7
(Germany) Tamara Korpatsch	2	6	5
(Czech Republic) Linda Fruhvirtová	4	1
14	(Ukraine) Lesia Tsurenko	6	6

Qualifying competition
6	Erika Andreeva	6^{3}	5
14	(Ukraine) Lesia Tsurenko	7^{7}	7

==== Seventh qualifier ====
First round
7	(Germany) Laura Siegemund	6	3	3
(Ukraine) Yuliia Starodubtseva	4	6	6
(Australia) Arina Rodionova	1	1^{r}
15	(Hungary) Anna Bondár	6	3

Qualifying competition
(Ukraine) Yuliia Starodubtseva	6^{4}	4
15	(Hungary) Anna Bondár	7^{7}	6

==== Eighth qualifier ====
First round
8	Kamilla Rakhimova	6	4	7
(Canada) Marina Stakusic	2	6	5
(Belgium) Greet Minnen	2	6	2
16	(United States) Bernarda Pera	6	1	6

Qualifying competition
8	Kamilla Rakhimova	2	7	2
16	(United States) Bernarda Pera	6	5	6
