= 2026 Wuhan Open =

- Date: 12–18 October
- Edition: 9th
- Category: WTA 1000
- Draw: 56S / 28D
- Surface: Hard / outdoor
- Location: Wuhan, China
- Venue: Optics Valley Int'l Tennis Center

Champions

Singles
- (Poland) Maja Chwalińska

Doubles
- (Canada) Gabriela Dabrowski / (Brazil) Luisa Stefani
- Wuhan Open

The 2026 Wuhan Open was a women's tennis tournament played on outdoor hard courts between 12–18 October 2026. It was the ninth edition of the Wuhan Open, and part of the WTA 1000 tournaments of the 2026 WTA Tour. The tournament was held at the Optics Valley International Tennis Center in Wuhan, China.

== Point distribution ==
Event	W	F	SF	QF	Round of 16	Round of 32	Round of 64	Q	Q2	Q1
Singles	1000	650	390	215	120	65	10	30	20	2
Doubles	1000	650	390	215	120	10	—N/a	—N/a	—N/a	—N/a

== Champions ==
=== Singles ===
- (Poland) Maja Chwalińska def. (United Kingdom) Sonay Kartal 2–6, 6–4, 6–2

=== Doubles ===
- (Canada) Gabriela Dabrowski / (Brazil) Luisa Stefani def. (Australia) Storm Hunter / (Czech Republic) Kateřina Siniaková, 7–5, 6–4
