= 2026 Wuhan Open – Singles =

Singles
- 2026 Wuhan Open

Final
- Champion: (Poland) Maja Chwalińska
- Runner-up: (United Kingdom) Sonay Kartal
- Score: 2–6, 6–4, 6–2
- Date: 18 October 2026

Details
- Draw: 56 (8 Q / 4 WC)
- Seeds: 16

Events
| Singles | Doubles |
- Wuhan Open

At the 2026 Wuhan Open, Maja Chwalińska defeated Sonay Kartal in the final, 2–6, 6–4, 6–2 to win the women's singles tennis title. The event took place on outdoor hard courts in Wuhan, China, and was a WTA 1000-level tournament. This was was Chwalińska's first career WTA Tour title and she was the fourth player (after Naomi Osaka, Bianca Andreescu, and Victoria Mboko) to win a WTA 1000 event as their first tour-level singles title. Ranked as the world No. 170, Kartal was the lowest-ranked WTA 1000 finalist since the format was introduced in 2009.

Coco Gauff was the reigning champion, but withdrew before the tournament due to fatigue. The semifinal match between Iga Świątek and Chwalińska marked the first all-Polish semifinal in WTA Tour history.

== Seeds ==
The top eight seeds received a bye into the second round.

1. Aryna Sabalenka (second round)
2. (United States) Jessica Pegula (second round)
3. Mirra Andreeva (withdrew)
4. (Czech Republic) Linda Nosková (withdrew)
5. (Ukraine) Elina Svitolina (quarterfinals)
6. (Czech Republic) Karolína Muchová (third round)
7. (Poland) Iga Świątek (semifinals)
8. (Ukraine) Marta Kostyuk (second round)
9. (Switzerland) Belinda Bencic (second round)
10. (United States) Iva Jovic (third round)
11. Diana Shnaider (quarterfinals)
12. (Romania) Sorana Cîrstea (first round)
13. (Philippines) Alexandra Eala (first round)
14. (Belgium) Elise Mertens (first round)
15. (Italy) Jasmine Paolini (third round)
16. (Poland) Maja Chwalińska (champion)
17. Anna Kalinskaya (withdrew)

Click on the seed number of a player to go to their draw section.

== Draw ==
Key

- Q = Qualifier
- WC = Wild card
- LL = Lucky loser
- Alt = Alternate
- ITF = ITF entry
- PR = Protected ranking
- SR = Special ranking
- SE = Special exempt
- JE = Junior exempt
- JR = Junior Accelerator Programme entrant
- CO = College Accelerator Programme entrant
- NG = Next Gen Accelerator Program entrant
- w/o = Walkover
- r = Retired
- d = Defaulted

=== Finals ===
Quarterfinals
(United States) Ann Li | 4 | 1
7 | (Poland) Iga Świątek | 6 | 6
16 | (Poland) Maja Chwalińska | 6 | 3 | 7
(Greece) Maria Sakkari | 0 | 6 | 5
5 | (Ukraine) Elina Svitolina | 2 | 6 | 4
PR | (United Kingdom) Sonay Kartal | 6 | 2 | 6
11 | Diana Shnaider | 6^{6} | 1
(Latvia) Jeļena Ostapenko | 7^{8} | 6

Semifinals
7 | (Poland) Iga Świątek | 5 | 1
16 | (Poland) Maja Chwalińska | 7 | 6
PR | (United Kingdom) Sonay Kartal | 7^{11} | 7^{7}
(Latvia) Jeļena Ostapenko | 6^{9} | 6^{5}

Final
16 | (Poland) Maja Chwalińska | 2 | 6 | 6
PR | (United Kingdom) Sonay Kartal | 6 | 4 | 2

=== Top half ===
==== Section 1 ====
First round
(United States) A Li | 6 | 3
LL | (Colombia) C Osorio | 1 | 0^{r}
(Indonesia) J Tjen | 6 | 6
Q | (Japan) A Ito | 3 | 1
(Ukraine) D Snigur | 6 | 7
14 | (Belgium) E Mertens | 4 | 5
LL | (United States) A Krueger | 6 | 6
(China) S Zhang | 3 | 0
(France) D Parry | 4 | 1
LL | (Thailand) L Tararudee | 6 | 6
Q | (Thailand) M Sawangkaew | 3 | 6^{5}
LL | (Poland) M Fręch | 6 | 7^{7}

Second round
1 | A Sabalenka | 6 | 4 | 6^{5}
(United States) A Li | 3 | 6 | 7^{7}
(Indonesia) J Tjen | 7 | 6
(Ukraine) D Snigur | 5 | 3
LL | (United States) A Krueger | 2 | 6 | 6
LL | (Thailand) L Tararudee | 6 | 1 | 1
LL | (Poland) M Fręch | 2 | 1
7 | (Poland) I Świątek | 6 | 6

Third round
(United States) A Li | 6 | 7^{7}
(Indonesia) J Tjen | 1 | 6^{1}
LL | (United States) A Krueger | 1 | 4
7 | (Poland) I Świątek | 6 | 6

Quarterfinals
(United States) A Li | 4 | 1
7 | (Poland) I Świątek | 6 | 6

==== Section 2 ====
First round
WC | (Ukraine) D Yastremska | 6 | 5 | 6
(Spain) C Bucșa | 4 | 7 | 3
(Denmark) C Tauson | 1 | 0^{r}
(Czech Republic) M Bouzková | 6 | 2
(Egypt) M Sherif | 3 | 2
16 | (Poland) M Chwalińska | 6 | 6
LL | (Hungary) A Bondár | 1 | 3
WC | (Slovakia) M Pohánková | 6 | 6
WC | (China) Xiy Wang | 6 | 6
(China) Xin Wang | 2 | 0
(Greece) M Sakkari | 6 | 6
(Croatia) D Vekić | 4 | 2

Second round
10 | (United States) I Jovic | 6 | 6
WC | (Ukraine) D Yastremska | 4 | 1
(Czech Republic) M Bouzková | 6 | 1 | 1
16 | (Poland) M Chwalińska | 1 | 6 | 6
WC | (Slovakia) M Pohánková | 7^{7} | 6^{7} | 6
WC | (China) Xiy Wang | 6^{2} | 7^{9} | 1
(Greece) M Sakkari | 4 | 6 | 6
8 | (Ukraine) M Kostyuk | 6 | 2 | 2

Third round
10 | (United States) I Jovic | 4 | 1
16 | (Poland) M Chwalińska | 6 | 6
WC | (Slovakia) M Pohánková | 1 | 4
(Greece) M Sakkari | 6 | 6

Quarterfinals
16 | (Poland) M Chwalińska | 6 | 3 | 7
(Greece) M Sakkari | 0 | 6 | 5

=== Bottom half ===
==== Section 3 ====
First round
(Czech Republic) K Siniaková | 1 | 7 | 2
L Samsonova | 6 | 5 | 6
(Australia) K Birrell | 7^{7} | 6^{3} | 3
Q | (United States) K Volynets | 6^{1} | 7^{7} | 6
WC | (China) H Guo | 1 | 7^{8} | 7
12 | (Romania) S Cîrstea | 6 | 6^{6} | 5
15 | (Italy) J Paolini | 6 | 6
(Czech Republic) S Bejlek | 3 | 4
(Austria) L Tagger | 6^{4} | 6 | 1
(Czech Republic) N Bartůňková | 7^{7} | 2 | 6
(Ukraine) A Kalinina | 5 | 3
PR | (United Kingdom) S Kartal | 7 | 6

Second round
5 | (Ukraine) E Svitolina | 6 | 5 | 6
L Samsonova | 2 | 7 | 2
Q | (United States) K Volynets | 4 | 6 | 6^{3}
WC | (China) H Guo | 6 | 4 | 7^{7}
15 | (Italy) J Paolini | 7^{7} | 6
(Czech Republic) N Bartůňková | 6^{5} | 3
PR | (United Kingdom) S Kartal | 6 | 7
9 | (Switzerland) B Bencic | 0 | 5

Third round
5 | (Ukraine) E Svitolina | 6 | 6
WC | (China) H Guo | 1 | 4
15 | (Italy) J Paolini | 2 | 0
PR | (United Kingdom) S Kartal | 6 | 6

Quarterfinals
5 | (Ukraine) E Svitolina | 2 | 6 | 4
PR | (United Kingdom) S Kartal | 6 | 2 | 6

==== Section 4 ====
First round
Q | (United States) C McNally | 2 | 7^{7} | 6
(Ukraine) Y Starodubtseva | 6 | 6^{2} | 4
Q | (Kazakhstan) Y Putintseva | 6^{1} | 6 | 7
Q | (Turkey) Z Sönmez | 7^{7} | 3 | 5
(United Kingdom) K Boulter | 3 | 1
11 | D Shnaider | 6 | 6
13 | (Philippines) A Eala | 6 | 3 | 3
Q | (China) H Shi | 4 | 6 | 6
E Alexandrova | 4 | 6 | 3
(Canada) L Fernandez | 6 | 3 | 6
Q | (Australia) D Kasatkina | 1 | 1
(Latvia) J Ostapenko | 6 | 6

Second round
6 | (Czech Republic) K Muchová | 3 | 7^{7} | 7^{7}
Q | (United States) C McNally | 6 | 6^{1} | 6^{4}
Q | (Kazakhstan) Y Putintseva | 2 | 2
11 | D Shnaider | 6 | 6
Q | (China) H Shi | 3 | 4
(Canada) L Fernandez | 6 | 6
(Latvia) J Ostapenko | 2 | 7^{9} | 6
2 | (United States) J Pegula | 6 | 6^{7} | 3

Third round
6 | (Czech Republic) K Muchová | 5 | 3
11 | D Shnaider | 7 | 6
(Canada) L Fernandez | 1 | 6 | 4
(Latvia) J Ostapenko | 6 | 1 | 6

Quarterfinals
11 | D Shnaider | 6^{6} | 1
(Latvia) J Ostapenko | 7^{8} | 6

== Seeded players ==
The following are the seeded players. Seedings are based on WTA rankings as of 28 September 2026. Rankings and points before are as of 12 October 2026.

Because the tournament takes place one week later this year, points from the 2025 Wuhan Open had already been deducted from ranking points as of 12 October 2026. Accordingly, the points defending column reflects either (a) results from tournaments which took place during the week of 13 October 2025 (Ningbo and Osaka) or (b) the player's 18th best result.

| ^{‡} | Champion |
| ^{†} | Runner-up |

| Seed | Rank | Player | Points before | Points defending (Ningbo / Osaka) | Points earned | Points after | Status |
|---|---|---|---|---|---|---|---|
| 1 | 2 | Aryna Sabalenka | 7,550 | (65)^{∆} | (65)^{Ω} | 7,550 | Second round lost to (United States) Ann Li |
| 2 | 4 | (United States) Jessica Pegula | 6,225 | (0)^{∆} | 10 | 6,235 | Second round lost to (Latvia) Jeļena Ostapenko |
| 3 | 3 | Mirra Andreeva | 6,371 | (65)^{∆} | 0 | 6,306 | Withdrew due to change of schedule |
| 4 | 8 | (Czech Republic) Linda Nosková | 4,679 | 1 | 0 | 4,678 | Withdrew due to left calf injury |
| 5 | 6 | (Ukraine) Elina Svitolina | 5,024 | (10)^{∆} | 215 | 5,229 | Quarterfinals lost to (United Kingdom) Sonay Kartal [PR] |
| 6 | 7 | (Czech Republic) Karolína Muchová | 4,773 | 60 | 120 | 4,833 | Third round lost to Diana Shnaider [11] |
| 7 | 9 | (Poland) Iga Świątek | 3,999 | (0)^{∆} | 390 | 4,389 | Semifinals lost to (Poland) Maja Chwalińska [16] |
| 8 | 10 | (Ukraine) Marta Kostyuk | 3,910 | (0)^{∆} | 10 | 3,920 | Second round lost to (Greece) Maria Sakkari |
| 9 | 12 | (Switzerland) Belinda Bencic | 2,760 | 108 | 10 | 2,662 | Second round lost to (United Kingdom) Sonay Kartal [PR] |
| 10 | 11 | (United States) Iva Jovic | 2,860 | (49)^{∆} | 120 | 2,931 | Third round lost to (Poland) Maja Chwalińska [16] |
| 11 | 13 | Diana Shnaider | 2,643 | 195 | 215 | 2,663 | Quarterfinals lost to (Latvia) Jeļena Ostapenko |
| 12 | 16 | (Romania) Sorana Cîrstea | 2,424 | 98 | (54)^{§} | 2,380 | First round lost to (China) Guo Hanyu [WC] |
| 13 | 19 | (Philippines) Alexandra Eala | 2,241 | (60)^{∆} | (60)^{Ω} | 2,241 | First round lost to (China) Shi Han [Q] |
| 14 | 14 | (Belgium) Elise Mertens | 2,540 | (60)^{∆} | (60)^{Ω} | 2,540 | First round lost to (Ukraine) Daria Snigur |
| 15 | 33 | (Italy) Jasmine Paolini | 1,528 | 195 | 120 | 1,453 | Third round lost to (United Kingdom) Sonay Kartal [PR] |
| 16 | 22 | (Poland) Maja Chwalińska^{‡} | 2,043 | (12)^{∆} | 1,000 | 3,031 | Champion, defeated (United Kingdom) Sonay Kartal [PR] |
| 17 | 21 | Anna Kalinskaya | 2,043 | (54)^{∆} | 0 | 1,989 | Withdrew due to illness |

∆ The player is defending points from her 18th best result.
Ω The player is keeping her 18th best result as it is higher than the Wuhan result, which does not need to be counted in her ranking points.
§ The player is substituting her next best result as it is higher than the Wuhan result, which does not need to be counted in her ranking points.

=== Withdrawn seeded players ===
The following players would have been seeded, but withdrew before the tournament began.

| Rank | Player | Points before | Points defending | Points after | Withdrawal reason |
|---|---|---|---|---|---|
| 1 | (Kazakhstan) Elena Rybakina | 9,696 | 500 | 9,196 | Left foot injury |
| 5 | (United States) Coco Gauff | 5,974 | (0)^{∆} | 5,974 | Fatigue |
| 15 | (Canada) Victoria Mboko | 2,502 | 1 | 2,501 | Left knee injury |
| 17 | (United States) Amanda Anisimova | 2,363 | (0)^{∆} | 2,363 | Wrist injury |

∆ The player is defending points from her 18th best result.

== Other entry information ==
=== Wildcards ===
- (China) Guo Hanyu
- (Slovakia) Mia Pohánková
- (China) Wang Xiyu
- (Ukraine) Dayana Yastremska

=== Protected ranking ===
- (United Kingdom) Sonay Kartal

=== Withdrawals ===
- † Mirra Andreeva → replaced by (Hungary) Anna Bondár (LL)
- ‡ (United States) Amanda Anisimova → replaced by (Ukraine) Anhelina Kalinina
- § (United States) Hailey Baptiste → replaced by (Egypt) Mayar Sherif (Note: Replaced first by Karolína Plíšková, who then withdrew from entry list.)
- ‡ (United States) Coco Gauff → replaced by (Australia) Kimberly Birrell
- † Anna Kalinskaya → replaced by (United States) Ashlyn Krueger (LL)
- ‡ (United States) Madison Keys → replaced by (Austria) Lilli Tagger
- ‡ (Czech Republic) Barbora Krejčíková → replaced by (China) Zheng Qinwen
- § (Canada) Victoria Mboko → replaced by (Spain) Cristina Bucșa
- ‡ (United States) Emma Navarro → replaced by (United Kingdom) Sonay Kartal (Note: Replaced first by Tamara Korpatsch, who then withdrew from entry list.)
- † (Czech Republic) Linda Nosková → replaced by (Poland) Magdalena Fręch (LL)
- † (Ukraine) Oleksandra Oliynykova → replaced by (Thailand) Lanlana Tararudee (LL)
- ‡ (Japan) Naomi Osaka → replaced by (United Kingdom) Katie Boulter
- ‡ (Austria) Anastasia Potapova → replaced by (Indonesia) Janice Tjen
- ‡ (Kazakhstan) Elena Rybakina → replaced by Liudmila Samsonova
- † (China) Zheng Qinwen → replaced by (Colombia) Camila Osorio (LL)

§ – not included on entry list
‡ – withdrew from entry list
† – withdrew from main draw

== Qualifying ==
=== Seeds ===
1. (United States) Peyton Stearns (first round)
2. (Australia) Talia Gibson (first round)
3. (Poland) Magdalena Fręch (qualifying competition, lucky loser)
4. (Turkey) Zeynep Sönmez (qualified)
5. (Romania) Elena-Gabriela Ruse (first round, retired)
6. (Thailand) Lanlana Tararudee (qualifying competition, lucky loser)
7. (Hungary) Anna Bondár (qualifying competition, lucky loser)
8. (Colombia) Camila Osorio (qualifying competition, lucky loser)
9. (Switzerland) Viktorija Golubic (first round)
10. (United States) Alycia Parks (first round)
11. (United States) Caty McNally (qualified)
12. (United States) Ashlyn Krueger (qualifying competition, lucky loser)
13. (United States) Katie Volynets (qualified)
14. (Australia) Maya Joint (first round)
15. (Uzbekistan) Kamilla Rakhimova (qualifying competition)
16. (Poland) Magda Linette (first round)

=== Qualifiers ===
1. (China) Shi Han
2. (Australia) Daria Kasatkina
3. (Japan) Aoi Ito
4. (Turkey) Zeynep Sönmez
5. (Kazakhstan) Yulia Putintseva
6. (United States) Caty McNally
7. (Thailand) Mananchaya Sawangkaew
8. (United States) Katie Volynets

=== Lucky losers ===
1. (Hungary) Anna Bondár
2. (Poland) Magdalena Fręch
3. (Colombia) Camila Osorio
4. (Thailand) Lanlana Tararudee
5. (United States) Ashlyn Krueger

=== Qualifying draw ===
==== First qualifier ====
First round
1 | (United States) Peyton Stearns | 6 | 5 | 4
WC | (China) Shi Han | 2 | 7 | 6
(United States) Sofia Kenin | 0 | 3
15 | (Uzbekistan) Kamilla Rakhimova | 6 | 6

Qualifying competition
WC | (China) Shi Han | 7^{7} | 6
15 | (Uzbekistan) Kamilla Rakhimova | 6^{2} | 1

==== Second qualifier ====
First round
2 | (Australia) Talia Gibson | 5 | 0
PR | (Spain) Sara Sorribes Tormo | 7 | 6
(Australia) Daria Kasatkina | 4 | 7^{7} | 6
9 | (Switzerland) Viktorija Golubic | 6 | 6^{3} | 4

Qualifying competition
PR | (Spain) Sara Sorribes Tormo | 6 | 2 | 1
(Australia) Daria Kasatkina | 2 | 6 | 6

==== Third qualifier ====
First round
3 | (Poland) Magdalena Fręch | 6 | 4
(Japan) Moyuka Uchijima | 4 | 1^{r}
PR | (Japan) Aoi Ito | 6 | 6
10 | (United States) Alycia Parks | 4 | 1

Qualifying competition
3 | (Poland) Magdalena Fręch | 6^{3} | 4
PR | (Japan) Aoi Ito | 7^{7} | 6

==== Fourth qualifier ====
First round
4 | (Turkey) Zeynep Sönmez | 6 | 6
Anastasia Zakharova | 3 | 2
(Austria) Sinja Kraus | 7^{7} | 6
16 | (Poland) Magda Linette | 6^{3} | 2

Qualifying competition
4 | (Turkey) Zeynep Sönmez | 6 | 6
(Austria) Sinja Kraus | 2 | 4

==== Fifth qualifier ====
First round
5 | (Romania) Elena-Gabriela Ruse | 5 | 1^{r}
(Kazakhstan) Yulia Putintseva | 7 | 2
(Australia) Taylah Preston | 3 | 6^{8}
12 | (United States) Ashlyn Krueger | 6 | 7^{7}

Qualifying competition
(Kazakhstan) Yulia Putintseva | 6 | 6
12 | (United States) Ashlyn Krueger | 1 | 3

==== Sixth qualifier ====
First round
6 | (Thailand) Lanlana Tararudee | 7^{7} | 6
(United States) Claire Liu | 6^{4} | 4
(China) Yuan Yue | 2 | 3
11 | (United States) Caty McNally | 6 | 6

Qualifying competition
6 | (Thailand) Lanlana Tararudee | 4 | 6 | 1
11 | (United States) Caty McNally | 6 | 4 | 6

==== Seventh qualifier ====
First round
7 | (Hungary) Anna Bondár | 7^{8} | 0
WC | (France) Loïs Boisson | 6^{6} | 1^{r}
(Thailand) Mananchaya Sawangkaew | 4 | 6 | 7^{7}
14 | (Australia) Maya Joint | 6 | 2 | 6^{3}

Qualifying competition
7 | (Hungary) Anna Bondár | 6^{5} | 6^{5}
(Thailand) Mananchaya Sawangkaew | 7^{7} | 7^{7}

==== Eighth qualifier ====
First round
8 | (Colombia) Camila Osorio | 6^{5} | 6 | 6
Alt | (Italy) Tyra Caterina Grant | 7^{7} | 2 | 4
(Uzbekistan) Polina Kudermetova | 2 | 1
13 | (United States) Katie Volynets | 6 | 6

Qualifying competition
8 | (Colombia) Camila Osorio | 6 | 3 | 4
13 | (United States) Katie Volynets | 3 | 6 | 6
