= 2024 Wuhan Open – Doubles =

Doubles
- 2024 Wuhan Open

Final
- Champions: (Kazakhstan) Anna Danilina; Irina Khromacheva
- Runners-up: (United States) Asia Muhammad (United States) Jessica Pegula
- Score: 6–3, 7–6^{(8–6)}

Details
- Draw: 28
- Seeds: 8

Events
Singles	Doubles
← 2019 ·	Wuhan Open	· 2025 →

Anna Danilina and Irina Khromacheva defeated Asia Muhammad and Jessica Pegula in the final, 6–3, 7–6^{(8–6)} to win the doubles tennis title at the 2024 Wuhan Open. It was the first WTA 1000 title for both players.

Duan Yingying and Veronika Kudermetova were the reigning champions from when the event was last held in 2019, but Duan had since retired from the sport. Kudermetova partnered Chan Hao-ching, but lost in the quarterfinals to Muhammad and Pegula.

== Seeds ==
The top four seeds received a bye into the second round.

1. (Canada) Gabriela Dabrowski / (New Zealand) Erin Routliffe (quarterfinals)
2. (United States) Nicole Melichar-Martinez / (Australia) Ellen Perez (quarterfinals)
3. (United States) Caroline Dolehide / (United States) Desirae Krawczyk (second round)
4. (Italy) Sara Errani / (Italy) Jasmine Paolini (second round)
5. (Belgium) Elise Mertens / (China) Zhang Shuai (second round)
6. (Chinese Taipei) Chan Hao-ching / Veronika Kudermetova (quarterfinals)
7. (Netherlands) Demi Schuurs / (Brazil) Luisa Stefani (first round)
8. (United States) Sofia Kenin / (United States) Bethanie Mattek-Sands (first round)

== Draw ==
=== Key ===
- Q = Qualifier
- WC = Wild card
- LL = Lucky loser
- Alt = Alternate
- ITF = ITF entry
- PR = Protected ranking
- SR = Special ranking
- SE = Special exempt
- JE = Junior exempt
- JR = Junior Accelerator Programme entrant
- CO = College Accelerator Programme entrant
- NG = Next Gen Accelerator Program entrant
- w/o = Walkover
- r = Retired
- d = Defaulted

=== Finals ===
Semifinals
(Kazakhstan) Anna Danilina; Irina Khromacheva	6	6
Ekaterina Alexandrova (Czech Republic) Kateřina Siniaková	1	4
(United States) Asia Muhammad (United States) Jessica Pegula	7	6
(Canada) Leylah Fernandez (Indonesia) Aldila Sutjiadi	5	2

Final
(Kazakhstan) Anna Danilina; Irina Khromacheva	6	7^{8}
(United States) Asia Muhammad (United States) Jessica Pegula	3	6^{6}

=== Top half ===
First round
(Poland) M Fręch (Bulgaria) V Tomova	2	6	[7]
(China) Y Wang (China) Y Xu	6	4	[10]
(Japan) M Ninomiya; Y Sizikova	4	0
(Kazakhstan) A Danilina; I Khromacheva	6	6
(Spain) C Bucșa (Romania) M Niculescu	6	3	[10]
7	(Netherlands) D Schuurs (Brazil) L Stefani	0	6	[4]
(Norway) U Eikeri (Chinese Taipei) F-h Wu	4	3
E Alexandrova (Czech Republic) K Siniaková	6	6
WC	(Romania) J Cristian; K Rakhimova	2	1
WC	(China) Q Tang (China) Xiy Wang	6	6
(Slovakia) T Mihalíková (United Kingdom) O Nicholls	7^{7}	6
8	(United States) S Kenin (United States) B Mattek-Sands	6^{3}	3

Second round
1	(Canada) G Dabrowski (New Zealand) E Routliffe	0	6	[11]
(China) Y Wang (China) Y Xu	6	4	[9]
(Kazakhstan) A Danilina; I Khromacheva	4	6	[10]
(Spain) C Bucșa (Romania) M Niculescu	6	0	[8]
4	(Italy) S Errani (Italy) J Paolini	6	4	[8]
E Alexandrova (Czech Republic) K Siniaková	4	6	[10]
WC	(China) Q Tang (China) Xiy Wang	1	2
(Slovakia) T Mihalíková (United Kingdom) O Nicholls	6	6

Quarterfinals
1	(Canada) G Dabrowski (New Zealand) E Routliffe	4	3
(Kazakhstan) A Danilina; I Khromacheva	6	6
E Alexandrova (Czech Republic) K Siniaková	7	6
(Slovakia) T Mihalíková (United Kingdom) O Nicholls	5	4

Semifinals
(Kazakhstan) A Danilina; I Khromacheva	6	6
E Alexandrova (Czech Republic) K Siniaková	1	4

=== Bottom half ===
First round
6	(Chinese Taipei) H-c Chan; V Kudermetova	6	7^{7}
(Italy) E Cocciaretto (France) D Parry	4	6^{2}
(Czech Republic) M Bouzková (Czech Republic) B Krejčíková	7^{9}	6
(Japan) S Aoyama (Japan) E Hozumi	6^{7}	4
(United States) A Muhammad (United States) J Pegula	6	6
(Mexico) G Olmos; A Panova	4	4
5	(Belgium) E Mertens (China) S Zhang	3	7^{7}	[10]
Alt	(Armenia) E Avanesyan (Australia) O Gadecki	6	6^{2}	[8]
(Brazil) B Haddad Maia (Germany) L Siegemund	6	5	[6]
(Canada) L Fernandez (Indonesia) A Sutjiadi	2	7	[10]
(Japan) M Kato (Ukraine) N Kichenok	2	1
(China) H Guo (China) X Jiang	6	6

Second round
6	(Chinese Taipei) H-c Chan; V Kudermetova	2	6	[10]
(Czech Republic) M Bouzková (Czech Republic) B Krejčíková	6	4	[6]
(United States) A Muhammad (United States) J Pegula	6^{8}	7^{7}	[10]
3	(United States) C Dolehide (United States) D Krawczyk	7^{10}	6^{4}	[6]
5	(Belgium) E Mertens (China) S Zhang	1	0
(Canada) L Fernandez (Indonesia) A Sutjiadi	6	6
(China) H Guo (China) X Jiang	0	4
2	(United States) N Melichar-Martinez (Australia) E Perez	6	6

Quarterfinals
6	(Chinese Taipei) H-c Chan; V Kudermetova	6	4	[4]
(United States) A Muhammad (United States) J Pegula	2	6	[10]
(Canada) L Fernandez (Indonesia) A Sutjiadi	6	6
2	(United States) N Melichar-Martinez (Australia) E Perez	4	4

Semifinals
(United States) A Muhammad (United States) J Pegula	7	6
(Canada) L Fernandez (Indonesia) A Sutjiadi	5	2
