= 2026 Wuhan Open – Doubles =

Doubles
- 2026 Wuhan Open

Final
- Champions: (Canada) Gabriela Dabrowski (Brazil) Luisa Stefani
- Runners-up: (Australia) Storm Hunter (Czech Republic) Kateřina Siniaková
- Score: 7–5, 6–4
- Date: 18 October 2026

Events
Singles	Doubles
- Wuhan Open

Gabriela Dabrowski and Luisa Stefani defeated defending champions Storm Hunter and Kateřina Siniaková in the final, 7–5, 6–4 to win the doubles tennis title at the 2026 Wuhan Open. It was Dabrowski's 26th WTA Tour doubles title, Stefani's 19th, and their eighth as a team. They were the first pair to win both the Beijing and Wuhan titles in the same year since Bethanie Mattek-Sands and Lucie Šafářová in 2016, and the fourth to do so overall.

== Seeds ==
The top four seeds received a bye into the second round.

1. (Canada) Gabriela Dabrowski / (Brazil) Luisa Stefani (champions)
2. (Kazakhstan) Anna Danilina / (China) Zhang Shuai (quarterfinals)
3. (Australia) Storm Hunter / (Czech Republic) Kateřina Siniaková (final)
4. (Chinese Taipei) Hsieh Su-wei / (Latvia) Jeļena Ostapenko (quarterfinals, withdrew)
5. (Spain) Cristina Bucșa / (United States) Nicole Melichar-Martinez (semifinals)
6. (China) Guo Hanyu / (France) Kristina Mladenovic (quarterfinals)
7. (Belgium) Elise Mertens / Diana Shnaider (withdrew)
8. (Italy) Sara Errani / (Italy) Jasmine Paolini (semifinals)

== Draw ==
Key

- Q = Qualifier
- WC = Wild card
- LL = Lucky loser
- Alt = Alternate
- ITF = ITF entry
- PR = Protected ranking
- SR = Special ranking
- SE = Special exempt
- JE = Junior exempt
- JR = Junior Accelerator Programme entrant
- CO = College Accelerator Programme entrant
- NG = Next Gen Accelerator Program entrant
- w/o = Walkover
- r = Retired
- d = Defaulted

=== Finals ===
Semifinals
1	(Canada) Gabriela Dabrowski (Brazil) Luisa Stefani	6	6
5	(Spain) Cristina Bucșa (United States) Nicole Melichar-Martinez	2	1
3	(Australia) Storm Hunter (Czech Republic) Kateřina Siniaková	5	7	[12]
8	(Italy) Sara Errani (Italy) Jasmine Paolini	7	5	[10]

Final
1	(Canada) Gabriela Dabrowski (Brazil) Luisa Stefani	7	6
3	(Australia) Storm Hunter (Czech Republic) Kateřina Siniaková	5	4

=== Top half ===
First round
(Australia) M Joint (United States) D Krawczyk	6	4	[5]
(Norway) U Eikeri (United States) Q Gleason	2	6	[10]
(Hungary) F Stollár (Chinese Taipei) F-h Wu	6	6
(New Zealand) E Routliffe (Indonesia) A Sutjiadi	3	3
(Czech Republic) N Bartůňková (Poland) M Chwalińska	6	1	[7]
Alt	(Estonia) I Neel (Mexico) G Olmos	3	6	[10]
WC	(United States) S Kenin; I Khromacheva	6	7
(United States) A Muhammad (United States) J Pegula	3	5
(United States) C McNally (Indonesia) J Tjen	6	4	[2]
(China) Q Tang (China) Y Xu	4	6	[10]
WC	(China) X Jiang (China) Xiy Wang	3	4
5	(Spain) C Bucșa (United States) N Melichar-Martinez	6	6

Second round
1	(Canada) G Dabrowski (Brazil) L Stefani	6	6
(Norway) U Eikeri (United States) Q Gleason	1	3
(Hungary) F Stollár (Chinese Taipei) F-h Wu	4	7^{7}	[6]
Alt	(Estonia) I Neel (Mexico) G Olmos	6	6^{5}	[10]
4	(Chinese Taipei) S-w Hsieh (Latvia) J Ostapenko	2	7^{7}	[10]
WC	(United States) S Kenin; I Khromacheva	6	6^{0}	[7]
(China) Q Tang (China) Y Xu	0	6^{5}
5	(Spain) C Bucșa (United States) N Melichar-Martinez	6	7^{7}

Quarterfinals
1	(Canada) G Dabrowski (Brazil) L Stefani	7^{7}	6
Alt	(Estonia) I Neel (Mexico) G Olmos	6^{4}	4
4	(Chinese Taipei) S-w Hsieh (Latvia) J Ostapenko
5	(Spain) C Bucșa (United States) N Melichar-Martinez	w/o

Semifinals
1	(Canada) G Dabrowski (Brazil) L Stefani	6	6
5	(Spain) C Bucșa (United States) N Melichar-Martinez	2	1

=== Bottom half ===
First round
6	(China) H Guo (France) K Mladenovic	6	6
(United Kingdom) M Lumsden; A Panova	4	3
(Australia) E Perez (Netherlands) D Schuurs	7	4	[3]
PR	(Czech Republic) M Bouzková (Spain) S Sorribes Tormo	5	6	[10]
Alt	M Kozyreva (United States) P Stearns	6	6^{7}	[11]
(Japan) S Aoyama (Chinese Taipei) E-s Liang	3	7^{9}	[9]
8	(Italy) S Errani (Italy) J Paolini	6	6
(Canada) L Fernandez (Australia) T Gibson	4	2
(Slovakia) T Mihalíková (United Kingdom) O Nicholls	6	2	[10]
(Chinese Taipei) H-c Chan (Japan) M Kato	3	6	[8]
WC	(Ukraine) A Kalinina (Ukraine) D Yastremska	6	6
(Philippines) A Eala (Turkey) Z Sönmez	2	3

Second round
6	(China) H Guo (France) K Mladenovic	w/o
PR	(Czech Republic) M Bouzková (Spain) S Sorribes Tormo
Alt	M Kozyreva (United States) P Stearns	3	3
3	(Australia) S Hunter (Czech Republic) K Siniaková	6	6
8	(Italy) S Errani (Italy) J Paolini	4	6	[10]
(Slovakia) T Mihalíková (United Kingdom) O Nicholls	6	2	[5]
WC	(Ukraine) A Kalinina (Ukraine) D Yastremska
2	(Kazakhstan) A Danilina (China) S Zhang	w/o

Quarterfinals
6	(China) H Guo (France) K Mladenovic	4	6	[1]
3	(Australia) S Hunter (Czech Republic) K Siniaková	6	2	[10]
8	(Italy) S Errani (Italy) J Paolini	6	6
2	(Kazakhstan) A Danilina (China) S Zhang	3	2

Semifinals
3	(Australia) S Hunter (Czech Republic) K Siniaková	5	7	[12]
8	(Italy) S Errani (Italy) J Paolini	7	5	[10]

== Seeded teams ==
The following are the seeded teams. Seedings are based on WTA rankings as of 28 September 2026.

Country	Player	Country	Player	Rank	Seed
CAN	Gabriela Dabrowski	BRA	Luisa Stefani	8	1
KAZ	Anna Danilina	CHN	Zhang Shuai	13	2
AUS	Storm Hunter	CZE	Kateřina Siniaková	18	3
TPE	Hsieh Su-wei	LAT	Jeļena Ostapenko	22	4
ESP	Cristina Bucșa	USA	Nicole Melichar-Martinez	23	5
CHN	Guo Hanyu	FRA	Kristina Mladenovic	27	6
~~BEL~~	~~Elise Mertens~~		~~Diana Shnaider~~	~~32~~	~~7~~
ITA	Sara Errani	ITA	Jasmine Paolini	39	8

== Other entrants ==
=== Wildcards ===
- (China) Jiang Xinyu / (China) Wang Xiyu
- (Ukraine) Anhelina Kalinina / (Ukraine) Dayana Yastremska
- (United States) Sofia Kenin / Irina Khromacheva

=== Protected ranking ===
- (Czech Republic) Marie Bouzková / (Spain) Sara Sorribes Tormo

=== Alternates ===
- Maria Kozyreva / (United States) Peyton Stearns
- (Estonia) Ingrid Neel / (Mexico) Giuliana Olmos

=== Withdrawals ===
- (Greece) Maria Sakkari / (Croatia) Donna Vekić → replaced by Maria Kozyreva / (United States) Peyton Stearns
- (Belgium) Elise Mertens / Diana Shnaider → replaced by (Estonia) Ingrid Neel / (Mexico) Giuliana Olmos
