= 2025 Wuhan Open – Doubles =

Doubles
- 2025 Wuhan Open

Final
- Champions: (Australia) Storm Hunter (Czech Republic) Kateřina Siniaková
- Runners-up: (Kazakhstan) Anna Danilina (Serbia) Aleksandra Krunić
- Score: 6–3, 6–2

Details
- Draw: 28 (3 WC)
- Seeds: 8

Events
| Singles | Doubles |
- Wuhan Open

Storm Hunter and Kateřina Siniaková defeated defending champion Anna Danilina and her partner Aleksandra Krunić in the final, 6–3, 6–2 to win the doubles tennis title at the 2025 Wuhan Open.

Danilina and Irina Khromacheva were the reigning champions, but chose not to compete together this year. Khromacheva partnered Aldila Sutjiadi, but lost in the first round to Leylah Fernandez and Erin Routliffe.

Siniaková retained the WTA No. 1 doubles ranking after reaching the semifinals. Taylor Townsend and Routliffe were also in contention for the top ranking at the start of the tournament.

== Seeds ==
The top four seeds received a bye into the second round.

1. (Italy) Sara Errani / (Italy) Jasmine Paolini (withdrew)
2. Veronika Kudermetova / (Belgium) Elise Mertens (withdrew)
3. (Chinese Taipei) Hsieh Su-wei / (Latvia) Jeļena Ostapenko (withdrew)
4. Mirra Andreeva / Diana Shnaider (second round)
5. (United States) Asia Muhammad / (Netherlands) Demi Schuurs (first round)
6. (China) Guo Hanyu / Alexandra Panova (second round)
7. (Hungary) Tímea Babos / (Brazil) Luisa Stefani (second round)
8. (Kazakhstan) Anna Danilina / (Serbia) Aleksandra Krunić (final)

== Draw ==
Key

- Q = Qualifier
- WC = Wild card
- LL = Lucky loser
- Alt = Alternate
- ITF = ITF entry
- PR = Protected ranking
- SR = Special ranking
- SE = Special exempt
- JE = Junior exempt
- JR = Junior Accelerator Programme entrant
- CO = College Accelerator Programme entrant
- NG = Next Gen Accelerator Program entrant
- w/o = Walkover
- r = Retired
- d = Defaulted

=== Finals ===
Semifinals
8 | (Kazakhstan) Anna Danilina (Serbia) Aleksandra Krunić | 6 | 4 | [11]
(Germany) Laura Siegemund (Hungary) Fanny Stollár | 1 | 6 | [9]
(Slovakia) Tereza Mihalíková (United Kingdom) Olivia Nicholls | 3 | 0
(Australia) Storm Hunter (Czech Republic) Kateřina Siniaková | 6 | 6

Final
8 | (Kazakhstan) Anna Danilina (Serbia) Aleksandra Krunić | 3 | 2
(Australia) Storm Hunter (Czech Republic) Kateřina Siniaková | 6 | 6

=== Top half ===
First round
WC | (Canada) B Andreescu (China) Y Yuan | 7^{7} | 3 | [10]
WC | (China) Q Tang (China) Xiy Wang | 6^{4} | 6 | [7]
(France) K Mladenovic (China) S Zhang | 4 | 0
(Japan) S Aoyama (Spain) C Bucșa | 6 | 6
(United States) S Kenin (United States) D Krawczyk | 4 | 5
8 | (Kazakhstan) A Danilina (Serbia) A Krunić | 6 | 7
(Germany) L Siegemund (Hungary) F Stollár | 7^{7} | 5 | [10]
(United States) N Melichar-Martinez; L Samsonova | 6^{4} | 7 | [8]
WC | (Greece) M Sakkari (Croatia) D Vekić | 7 | 3 | [8]
Alt | (United States) I Jovic (Mexico) G Olmos | 5 | 6 | [10]
(Poland) M Linette (Denmark) C Tauson | 3 | 5
7 | (Hungary) T Babos (Brazil) L Stefani | 6 | 7

Second round
1 | (Italy) S Errani (Italy) J Paolini
WC | (Canada) B Andreescu (China) Y Yuan | w/o
(Japan) S Aoyama (Spain) C Bucșa | 6 | 4 | [10]
8 | (Kazakhstan) A Danilina (Serbia) A Krunić | 3 | 6 | [12]
4 | M Andreeva; D Shnaider | 4 | 4
(Germany) L Siegemund (Hungary) F Stollár | 6 | 6
Alt | (United States) I Jovic (Mexico) G Olmos | 6 | 2 | [10]
7 | (Hungary) T Babos (Brazil) L Stefani | 4 | 6 | [7]

Quarterfinals
WC | (Canada) B Andreescu (China) Y Yuan | 4 | 6^{1}
8 | (Kazakhstan) A Danilina (Serbia) A Krunić | 6 | 7^{7}
(Germany) L Siegemund (Hungary) F Stollár | 6 | 6
Alt | (United States) I Jovic (Mexico) G Olmos | 4 | 4

Semifinals
8 | (Kazakhstan) A Danilina (Serbia) A Krunić | 6 | 4 | [11]
(Germany) L Siegemund (Hungary) F Stollár | 1 | 6 | [9]

=== Bottom half ===
First round
5 | (United States) A Muhammad (Netherlands) D Schuurs | 4 | 3
(Ukraine) L Kichenok (Australia) E Perez | 6 | 6
(Slovakia) T Mihalíková (United Kingdom) O Nicholls | 6 | 6
(Australia) M Joint (Canada) V Mboko | 4 | 4
(Canada) L Fernandez (New Zealand) E Routliffe | 2 | 6 | [10]
I Khromacheva (Indonesia) A Sutjiadi | 6 | 4 | [6]
6 | (China) H Guo; A Panova | 7 | 6
(Serbia) O Danilović (Ukraine) M Kostyuk | 5 | 3
(Chinese Taipei) H-c Chan (China) X Jiang | 6 | 6
(Japan) E Hozumi (Chinese Taipei) F-h Wu | 3 | 3
(Australia) S Hunter (Czech Republic) K Siniaková | 6 | 6
(United States) A Krueger (United States) J Pegula | 1 | 0

Second round
(Ukraine) L Kichenok (Australia) E Perez | 5 | 6 | [5]
(Slovakia) T Mihalíková (United Kingdom) O Nicholls | 7 | 2 | [10]
(Canada) L Fernandez (New Zealand) E Routliffe | 6 | 4 | [4]
Alt | (Czech Republic) L Nosková (Slovakia) R Šramková | 4 | 6 | [10]
6 | (China) H Guo; A Panova | 2 | 4
(Chinese Taipei) H-c Chan (China) X Jiang | 6 | 6
(Australia) S Hunter (Czech Republic) K Siniaková | w/o
2 | V Kudermetova (Belgium) E Mertens

Quarterfinals
(Slovakia) T Mihalíková (United Kingdom) O Nicholls | 7 | 2 | [10]
Alt | (Czech Republic) L Nosková (Slovakia) R Šramková | 5 | 6 | [5]
(Chinese Taipei) H-c Chan (China) X Jiang | 4 | 2
(Australia) S Hunter (Czech Republic) K Siniaková | 6 | 6

Semifinals
(Slovakia) T Mihalíková (United Kingdom) O Nicholls | 3 | 0
(Australia) S Hunter (Czech Republic) K Siniaková | 6 | 6

== Seeded teams ==
The following are the seeded teams. Seedings are based on WTA rankings as of 22 September 2025.

| Country | Player | Country | Player | Rank^{1} | Seed |
|---|---|---|---|---|---|
| ~~ITA~~ | ~~Sara Errani~~ | ~~ITA~~ | ~~Jasmine Paolini~~ | ~~10~~ | ~~1~~ |
| | ~~Veronika Kudermetova~~ | ~~BEL~~ | ~~Elise Mertens~~ | ~~16~~ | ~~2~~ |
| ~~TPE~~ | ~~Hsieh Su-wei~~ | ~~LAT~~ | ~~Jeļena Ostapenko~~ | ~~19~~ | ~~3~~ |
| | Mirra Andreeva | | Diana Shnaider | 22 | 4 |
| USA | Asia Muhammad | NED | Demi Schuurs | 31 | 5 |
| CHN | Guo Hanyu | | Alexandra Panova | 41 | 6 |
| HUN | Tímea Babos | BRA | Luisa Stefani | 42 | 7 |
| KAZ | Anna Danilina | SRB | Aleksandra Krunić | 48 | 8 |

== Other entrants ==
=== Wildcards ===
- (Canada) Bianca Andreescu / (China) Yuan Yue
- (Greece) Maria Sakkari / (Croatia) Donna Vekić
- (China) Tang Qianhui / (China) Wang Xiyu

=== Alternates ===
- (United States) Iva Jovic / (Mexico) Giuliana Olmos
- (Czech Republic) Linda Nosková / (Slovakia) Rebecca Šramková

=== Withdrawals ===
- (Norway) Ulrikke Eikeri / (China) Xu Yifan → replaced by (United States) Iva Jovic / (Mexico) Giuliana Olmos
- (Italy) Sara Errani / (Italy) Jasmine Paolini → not replaced
- (Chinese Taipei) Hsieh Su-wei / (Latvia) Jeļena Ostapenko → replaced by (Czech Republic) Linda Nosková / (Slovakia) Rebecca Šramková
- Veronika Kudermetova / (Belgium) Elise Mertens → not replaced
