= Wuhan Open =

WTA Tour
- Founded: 2014; 12 years ago
- Editions: 9 (2026)
- Location: Wuhan, Hubei; China
- Venue: Optics Valley International Tennis Center
- Category: WTA 1000
- Surface: Hard / Outdoors
- Draw: 56S/32Q/28D
- Prize money: US$ 3,654,963
- Website: wuhanopentennis.com

Current champions (2026)
- Singles: (Poland) Maja Chwalińska
- Doubles: (Canada) Gabriela Dabrowski (Brazil) Luisa Stefani

The Wuhan Open (Chinese: 武汉网球公开赛), sponsored by Dongfeng Voyah, is a WTA 1000 tennis tournament held in Wuhan, Hubei Province, China and organized for female professional tennis players. It is one of the WTA 1000 tournaments on the WTA Tour and made its debut in the 2014 season.

The Wuhan Open is one of three Women's Tennis Association events in China that were new to the calendar in 2014, bringing the total number of women's professional tournaments in the country to six. It used to be one of two Premier-level stops in China. The tournament was scheduled in 2014 to run during the week of 22 September, and took over from the Pan Pacific Open held in Tokyo, Japan as a Premier 5-level event. Since 2024, it is a WTA 1000 tournament, thereby making it the joint largest women's tennis tournament in East Asia, together with the China Open in Beijing. It is on the calendar after the aforementioned Premier events in Tokyo (the Pan Pacific Open) and Beijing (the China Open), during the WTA's Asian swing.

The Wuhan Open returned to the WTA Tour in October 2024 after a four-year hiatus due to the COVID-19 pandemic, with enhanced status as a WTA 1000 Mandatory event and with $3,221,715 in prize money.

Wuhan, the capital of Hubei province, is the hometown of two-time Grand Slam champion Li Na and 2024 Olympic Gold Medalist Zheng Qinwen.

== Results ==
=== Singles ===
| Year | Champion | Runner-up | Score |
|---|---|---|---|
| 2014 | (Czech Republic) Petra Kvitová | (Canada) Eugenie Bouchard | 6–3, 6–4 |
| 2015 | (United States) Venus Williams | (Spain) Garbiñe Muguruza | 6–3, 3–0, ret. |
| 2016 | (Czech Republic) Petra Kvitová (2) | (Slovakia) Dominika Cibulková | 6–1, 6–1 |
| 2017 | (France) Caroline Garcia | (Australia) Ashleigh Barty | 6–7^{(3–7)}, 7–6^{(7–4)}, 6–2 |
| 2018 | (Belarus) Aryna Sabalenka | (Estonia) Anett Kontaveit | 6–3, 6–3 |
| 2019 | (Belarus) Aryna Sabalenka (2) | (United States) Alison Riske | 6–3, 3–6, 6–1 |
| 2020–2023 | Cancelled due to the COVID-19 pandemic. | | |
| 2024 | Aryna Sabalenka (3) | (China) Zheng Qinwen | 6–3, 5–7, 6–3 |
| 2025 | (United States) Coco Gauff | (United States) Jessica Pegula | 6–4, 7–5 |
| 2026 | (Poland) Maja Chwalińska | (United Kingdom) Sonay Kartal | 2–6, 6–4, 6–2 |

=== Doubles ===
| Year | Champions | Runners-up | Score |
|---|---|---|---|
| 2014 | (Switzerland) Martina Hingis (Italy) Flavia Pennetta | (Zimbabwe) Cara Black (France) Caroline Garcia | 6–4, 5–7, [12–10] |
| 2015 | (Switzerland) Martina Hingis (2) (India) Sania Mirza | (Romania) Irina-Camelia Begu (Romania) Monica Niculescu | 6–2, 6–3 |
| 2016 | (United States) Bethanie Mattek-Sands (Czech Republic) Lucie Šafářová | (India) Sania Mirza (Czech Republic) Barbora Strýcová | 6–1, 6–4 |
| 2017 | (Chinese Taipei) Chan Yung-jan (Switzerland) Martina Hingis (3) | (Japan) Shuko Aoyama (China) Yang Zhaoxuan | 7–6^{(7–5)}, 3–6, [10–4] |
| 2018 | (Belgium) Elise Mertens (Netherlands) Demi Schuurs | (Czech Republic) Andrea Sestini Hlaváčková (Czech Republic) Barbora Strýcová | 6–3, 6–3 |
| 2019 | (China) Duan Yingying (Russia) Veronika Kudermetova | (Belgium) Elise Mertens (Belarus) Aryna Sabalenka | 7–6^{(7–3)}, 6–2 |
| 2020–2023 | Cancelled due to the COVID-19 pandemic. | | |
| 2024 | (Kazakhstan) Anna Danilina; Irina Khromacheva | (United States) Asia Muhammad (United States) Jessica Pegula | 6–3, 7–6^{(8–6)} |
| 2025 | (Australia) Storm Hunter (Czech Republic) Kateřina Siniaková | (Kazakhstan) Anna Danilina (Serbia) Aleksandra Krunić | 6–3, 6–2 |
| 2026 | (Canada) Gabriela Dabrowski (Brazil) Luisa Stefani | (Australia) Storm Hunter (Czech Republic) Kateřina Siniaková | 7–5, 6–4 |

== See also ==
- Women's Tennis Association
- List of tennis tournaments
- Optics Valley International Tennis Center
