= 2025 Wuhan Open – Singles =

Singles
- 2025 Wuhan Open

Final
- Champion: (United States) Coco Gauff
- Runner-up: (United States) Jessica Pegula
- Score: 6–4, 7–5

Details
- Draw: 56 (8 Q / 4 WC )
- Seeds: 16

Events
Singles	Doubles
- Wuhan Open

Coco Gauff defeated Jessica Pegula in the final, 6–4, 7–5 to win the singles tennis title at the 2025 Wuhan Open. She did not lose a set en route to her third WTA 1000 and eleventh WTA Tour singles title. Gauff became the first player in history to go undefeated in their first nine hardcourt finals.

Aryna Sabalenka was the three-time defending champion, but lost in the semifinals to Pegula. The loss ended Sabalenka's unbeaten 20-match win streak at the tournament, dating back to her debut in 2018. By reaching the semifinals, Sabalenka claimed the year-end world No. 1 ranking for the second year in a row.

At the conclusion of the tournament, Ekaterina Alexandrova made her debut in the top 10 of the WTA rankings, becoming the third-oldest woman to do so.

== Seeds ==
The top eight seeds received a bye into the second round.

1. Aryna Sabalenka (semifinals)
2. (Poland) Iga Świątek (quarterfinals)
3. (United States) Coco Gauff (champion)
4. (United States) Amanda Anisimova (withdrew)
5. Mirra Andreeva (second round)
6. (United States) Jessica Pegula (final)
7. (Italy) Jasmine Paolini (semifinals)
8. (Kazakhstan) Elena Rybakina (quarterfinals)
9. Ekaterina Alexandrova (third round)
10. (Denmark) Clara Tauson (third round, retired)
11. (Japan) Naomi Osaka (second round)
12. (Czech Republic) Karolína Muchová (second round, retired)
13. (Switzerland) Belinda Bencic (third round)
14. (United States) Emma Navarro (first round)
15. Diana Shnaider (first round)
16. Liudmila Samsonova (third round)

Click on the seed number of a player to go to their draw section.

== Draw ==
Key

- Q = Qualifier
- WC = Wild card
- LL = Lucky loser
- Alt = Alternate
- ITF = ITF entry
- PR = Protected ranking
- SR = Special ranking
- SE = Special exempt
- JE = Junior exempt
- JR = Junior Accelerator Programme entrant
- CO = College Accelerator Programme entrant
- NG = Next Gen Accelerator Program entrant
- w/o = Walkover
- r = Retired
- d = Defaulted

=== Finals ===
Quarterfinals
1	Aryna Sabalenka	6	6
8	(Kazakhstan) Elena Rybakina	3	3
Q	(Czech Republic) Kateřina Siniaková	6	0	3
6	(United States) Jessica Pegula	2	6	6
(Germany) Laura Siegemund	3	0
3	(United States) Coco Gauff	6	6
7	(Italy) Jasmine Paolini	6	6
2	(Poland) Iga Świątek	1	2

Semifinals
1	Aryna Sabalenka	6	4	6^{2}
6	(United States) Jessica Pegula	2	6	7^{7}
3	(United States) Coco Gauff	6	6
7	(Italy) Jasmine Paolini	4	3

Final
6	(United States) Jessica Pegula	4	5
3	(United States) Coco Gauff	6	7

=== Top half ===
==== Section 1 ====
First round
(Slovakia) R Šramková	6	3	6
A Kalinskaya	2	6	3
Q	A Zakharova	6	6^{5}	3
(United States) S Kenin	3	7^{7}	6
LL	(Colombia) E Arango	1	5
16	L Samsonova	6	7
11	(Japan) N Osaka	4	7	6
(Canada) L Fernandez	6	5	3
(Czech Republic) L Nosková	6	4	7^{7}
Q	(Kazakhstan) Y Putintseva	4	6	6^{2}
(United States) M Kessler	7^{8}	0	3
(Romania) J Cristian	6^{6}	6	6

Second round
1	A Sabalenka	4	6	6
(Slovakia) R Šramková	6	3	1
(United States) S Kenin	6	3	1
16	L Samsonova	3	6	6
11	(Japan) N Osaka	6^{2}	3
(Czech Republic) L Nosková	7^{7}	6
(Romania) J Cristian	4	3
8	(Kazakhstan) E Rybakina	6	6

Third round
1	A Sabalenka	6	6
16	L Samsonova	3	2
(Czech Republic) L Nosková	3	4
8	(Kazakhstan) E Rybakina	6	6

Quarterfinals
1	A Sabalenka	6	6
8	(Kazakhstan) E Rybakina	3	3

==== Section 2 ====
First round
Q	(France) V Gracheva	6^{0}	2
(Spain) J Bouzas Maneiro	7^{7}	6
PR	(China) L Zhu	5	6^{10}
(Australia) M Joint	7	7^{12}
Q	(Czech Republic) K Siniaková	6	6
15	D Shnaider	4	4
9	E Alexandrova	6	6
(Canada) V Mboko	3	2
(United Kingdom) E Raducanu	1	1^{r}
(United States) A Li	6	4
(United States) A Krueger	6	4	2
(United States) H Baptiste	2	6	6

Second round
LL	(United States) I Jovic	6	6
(Spain) J Bouzas Maneiro	4	4
(Australia) M Joint	3	1
Q	(Czech Republic) K Siniaková	6	6
9	E Alexandrova	7^{7}	6
(United States) A Li	6^{5}	2
(United States) H Baptiste	4	6	6^{6}
6	(United States) J Pegula	6	4	7^{8}

Third round
LL	(United States) I Jovic	5	3
Q	(Czech Republic) K Siniaková	7	6
9	E Alexandrova	5	6	3
6	(United States) J Pegula	7	3	6

Quarterfinals
Q	(Czech Republic) K Siniaková	6	0	3
6	(United States) J Pegula	2	6	6

=== Bottom half ===
==== Section 3 ====
First round
(Ukraine) D Yastremska	5	6	1^{r}
(Germany) L Siegemund	7	4	4
(Poland) M Fręch	6	2	6
V Kudermetova	3	6	3
(Ukraine) M Kostyuk	6	2	4
12	(Czech Republic) K Muchová	2	6	6
14	(United States) E Navarro	2	6	3
WC	(China) S Zhang	6	2	6
PR	(Romania) S Cîrstea	6	2
(Latvia) J Ostapenko	0	1^{r}
Q	(Japan) M Uchijima	6	7^{7}
(China) Xin Wang	4	6^{3}

Second round
5	M Andreeva	7^{7}	3	3
(Germany) L Siegemund	6^{4}	6	6
(Poland) M Fręch	7^{7}	4
12	(Czech Republic) K Muchová	6^{1}	1^{r}
WC	(China) S Zhang	6	3	6
PR	(Romania) S Cîrstea	4	6	4
Q	(Japan) M Uchijima	1	0
3	(United States) C Gauff	6	6

Third round
(Germany) L Siegemund	6	7^{7}
(Poland) M Fręch	4	6^{2}
WC	(China) S Zhang	3	2
3	(United States) C Gauff	6	6

Quarterfinals
(Germany) L Siegemund	3	0
3	(United States) C Gauff	6	6

==== Section 4 ====
First round
Q	(Italy) L Bronzetti	6^{2}	6^{1}
WC	(China) Y Yuan	7^{7}	7^{7}
Q	(Croatia) A Ružić	6	6
(Poland) M Linette	2	3
(Serbia) O Danilović	3	5
10	(Denmark) C Tauson	6	7
13	(Switzerland) B Bencic	6	6
WC	(Croatia) D Vekić	2	2
(Belgium) E Mertens	7^{7}	6
Q	P Kudermetova	6^{5}	3
WC	(Colombia) C Osorio	3	4
(Czech Republic) M Bouzková	6	6

Second round
7	(Italy) J Paolini	3	6	6
WC	(China) Y Yuan	6	4	3
Q	(Croatia) A Ružić	4	0
10	(Denmark) C Tauson	6	6
13	(Switzerland) B Bencic	w/o
(Belgium) E Mertens
(Czech Republic) M Bouzková	1	1
2	(Poland) I Świątek	6	6

Third round
7	(Italy) J Paolini	3	6	3
10	(Denmark) C Tauson	6	1	1^{r}
13	(Switzerland) B Bencic	6^{2}	4
2	(Poland) I Świątek	7^{7}	6

Quarterfinals
7	(Italy) J Paolini	6	6
2	(Poland) I Świątek	1	2

== Seeded players ==
The following are the seeded players. Seedings are based on WTA rankings as of 22 September 2025. Rankings and points before are as of 6 October 2025.

Seed	Rank	Player	Points before	Points defending	Points won	Points after	Status
1	1	Aryna Sabalenka	11,010	1,000	390	10,400	Semifinals lost to (United States) Jessica Pegula [6]
2	2	(Poland) Iga Świątek	8,553	0	215	8,768	Quarterfinals lost to (Italy) Jasmine Paolini [7]
3	3	(United States) Coco Gauff	7,263	390	1,000	7,873	Champion, defeated (United States) Jessica Pegula [6]
4	4	(United States) Amanda Anisimova	5,989	65	0	5,924	Withdrew due to calf injury
5	5	Mirra Andreeva	4,698	65	10	4,643	Second round lost to (Germany) Laura Siegemund
6	6	(United States) Jessica Pegula	4,653	120	650	5,183	Runner-up, lost to (United States) Coco Gauff [3]
7	8	(Italy) Jasmine Paolini	4,156	215	390	4,331	Semifinals lost to (United States) Coco Gauff [3]
8	9	(Kazakhstan) Elena Rybakina	3,898	0	215	4,113	Quarterfinals lost to Aryna Sabalenka [1]
9	11	Ekaterina Alexandrova	3,253	215	120	3,158	Third round lost to (United States) Jessica Pegula [6]
10	12	(Denmark) Clara Tauson	2,723	(54)^{†}	120	2,789	Third round retired against (Italy) Jasmine Paolini [7]
11	16	(Japan) Naomi Osaka	2,379	0	65	2,444	Second round lost to (Czech Republic) Linda Nosková
12	22	(Czech Republic) Karolína Muchová	1,958	0	65	2,023	Second retired against (Poland) Magdalena Fręch
13	15	(Switzerland) Belinda Bencic	2,453	(9)^{†}	120	2,564	Third round lost to (Poland) Iga Świątek [2]
14	14	(United States) Emma Navarro	2,515	(60)^{†}	(60)^{†}	2,515	First round lost to (China) Zhang Shuai [WC]
15	18	Diana Shnaider	2,056	(60)^{†}	(60)^{†}	2,056	First round lost to (Czech Republic) Kateřina Siniaková [Q]
16	20	Liudmila Samsonova	2,049	10	120	2,159	Third round lost to Aryna Sabalenka [1]

† The player is defending points from her 18th best result.
‡ The player is keeping her 18th best result as it is higher than the Wuhan result, which does not need to be counted in her rankings.
§ The player is substituting her next best result as it is higher than the Wuhan result, which does not need to be counted in her rankings.

=== Withdrawn seeded players ===
The following players would have been seeded, but withdrew before the tournament began.

Rank	Player	Points before	Points dropping	Points after	Withdrawal reason
7	(United States) Madison Keys	4,459	10	4,449	Shoulder injury
10	(China) Zheng Qinwen	3,678	650	3,028	Elbow injury
13	(Ukraine) Elina Svitolina	2,606	0	2,606	Personal reasons

== Other entry information ==
=== Wildcards ===
- (Colombia) Camila Osorio
- (Croatia) Donna Vekić
- (China) Yuan Yue
- (China) Zhang Shuai

=== Protected ranking ===
- (Romania) Sorana Cîrstea
- (China) Zhu Lin

=== Withdrawals ===
- § (United States) Amanda Anisimova → replaced by (United States) Iva Jovic (LL)
- ‡ (Spain) Paula Badosa → replaced by (United States) Hailey Baptiste
- ‡ (Brazil) Beatriz Haddad Maia → replaced by (United States) Ashlyn Krueger
- † (Australia) Daria Kasatkina → replaced by (Colombia) Emiliana Arango (LL)
- ‡ (United States) Madison Keys → replaced by (Czech Republic) Marie Bouzková
- ‡ (Czech Republic) Barbora Krejčíková → replaced by (United States) Ann Li
- ‡ (Czech Republic) Karolína Plíšková → replaced by (Germany) Laura Siegemund
- ‡ (Ukraine) Elina Svitolina → replaced by (Romania) Jaqueline Cristian
- ‡ (Czech Republic) Markéta Vondroušová → replaced by (Australia) Maya Joint
- ‡ (China) Zheng Qinwen → replaced by (Spain) Jéssica Bouzas Maneiro

‡ – withdrew from entry list before qualifying began
† – withdrew from entry list after qualifying began
§ – withdrew from main draw

== Qualifying ==
=== Seeds ===
1. (United States) Iva Jovic (qualifying competition, lucky loser)
2. (Colombia) Emiliana Arango (qualifying competition, lucky loser)
3. (United Kingdom) Katie Boulter (first round)
4. (Netherlands) Suzan Lamens (first round)
5. (Philippines) Alexandra Eala (first round)
6. (United States) Alycia Parks (first round)
7. (Czech Republic) Kateřina Siniaková (qualified)
8. (Kazakhstan) Yulia Putintseva (qualified)
9. (Spain) Cristina Bucșa (first round)
10. Anna Blinkova (qualifying competition)
11. (Italy) Lucia Bronzetti (qualified)
12. (Czech Republic) Tereza Valentová (first round)
13. Polina Kudermetova (qualified)
14. (France) Varvara Gracheva (qualified)
15. (Croatia) Antonia Ružić (qualified)
16. (Turkey) Zeynep Sönmez (first round)

=== Qualifiers ===
1. (France) Varvara Gracheva
2. (Croatia) Antonia Ružić
3. Polina Kudermetova
4. (Italy) Lucia Bronzetti
5. (Japan) Moyuka Uchijima
6. Anastasia Zakharova
7. (Czech Republic) Kateřina Siniaková
8. (Kazakhstan) Yulia Putintseva

=== Lucky losers ===
1. (Colombia) Emiliana Arango
2. (United States) Iva Jovic

=== Qualifying draw ===
==== First qualifier ====
First round
1	(United States) Iva Jovic	6	6
Kamilla Rakhimova	3	4
(Australia) Ajla Tomljanović	7	2^{r}
14	(France) Varvara Gracheva	5	5

Qualifying competition
1	(United States) Iva Jovic	6	4	2
14	(France) Varvara Gracheva	3	6	6

==== Second qualifier ====
First round
2	(Colombia) Emiliana Arango	6	4	7^{7}
(Hungary) Anna Bondár	4	6	6^{5}
(Italy) Elisabetta Cocciaretto	3	1
15	(Croatia) Antonia Ružić	6	6

Qualifying competition
2	(Colombia) Emiliana Arango	6^{4}	4
15	(Croatia) Antonia Ružić	7^{7}	6

==== Third qualifier ====
First round
3	(United Kingdom) Katie Boulter	6	4	1
Alt	(Bulgaria) Viktoriya Tomova	3	6	6
(Ukraine) Yuliia Starodubtseva	6^{4}	5
13	Polina Kudermetova	7^{7}	7

Qualifying competition
Alt	(Bulgaria) Viktoriya Tomova	4	1
13	Polina Kudermetova	6	6

==== Fourth qualifier ====
First round
4	(Netherlands) Suzan Lamens	1	2
(Australia) Kimberly Birrell	6	6
WC	(China) Tian Fangran	4	2
11	(Italy) Lucia Bronzetti	6	6

Qualifying competition
(Australia) Kimberly Birrell	3	6	4
11	(Italy) Lucia Bronzetti	6	4	6

==== Fifth qualifier ====
First round
5	(Philippines) Alexandra Eala	4	6	2
(Japan) Moyuka Uchijima	6	3	6
WC	(China) Wang Xiyu	2	6	6
9	(Spain) Cristina Bucșa	6	3	3

Qualifying competition
(Japan) Moyuka Uchijima	6	6
WC	(China) Wang Xiyu	4	3

==== Sixth qualifier ====
First round
6	(United States) Alycia Parks	4	0
Anastasia Zakharova	6	6
WC	(Canada) Bianca Andreescu	6	6
12	(Czech Republic) Tereza Valentová	4	2

Qualifying competition
Anastasia Zakharova	1	7^{8}	6
WC	(Canada) Bianca Andreescu	6	6^{6}	3

==== Seventh qualifier ====
First round
7	(Czech Republic) Kateřina Siniaková	7	6
(United States) Caty McNally	5	3
PR	(China) Wang Yafan	6	4	6
16	(Turkey) Zeynep Sönmez	4	6	4

Qualifying competition
7	(Czech Republic) Kateřina Siniaková	6	7
PR	(China) Wang Yafan	3	5

==== Eighth qualifier ====
First round
8	(Kazakhstan) Yulia Putintseva	6	6
WC	(France) Diane Parry	1	0
(United States) Caroline Dolehide	6	4	1
10	Anna Blinkova	4	6	6

Qualifying competition
8	(Kazakhstan) Yulia Putintseva	6	6
10	Anna Blinkova	1	1
