= Optics Valley International Tennis Center =

Tennis facility located in China

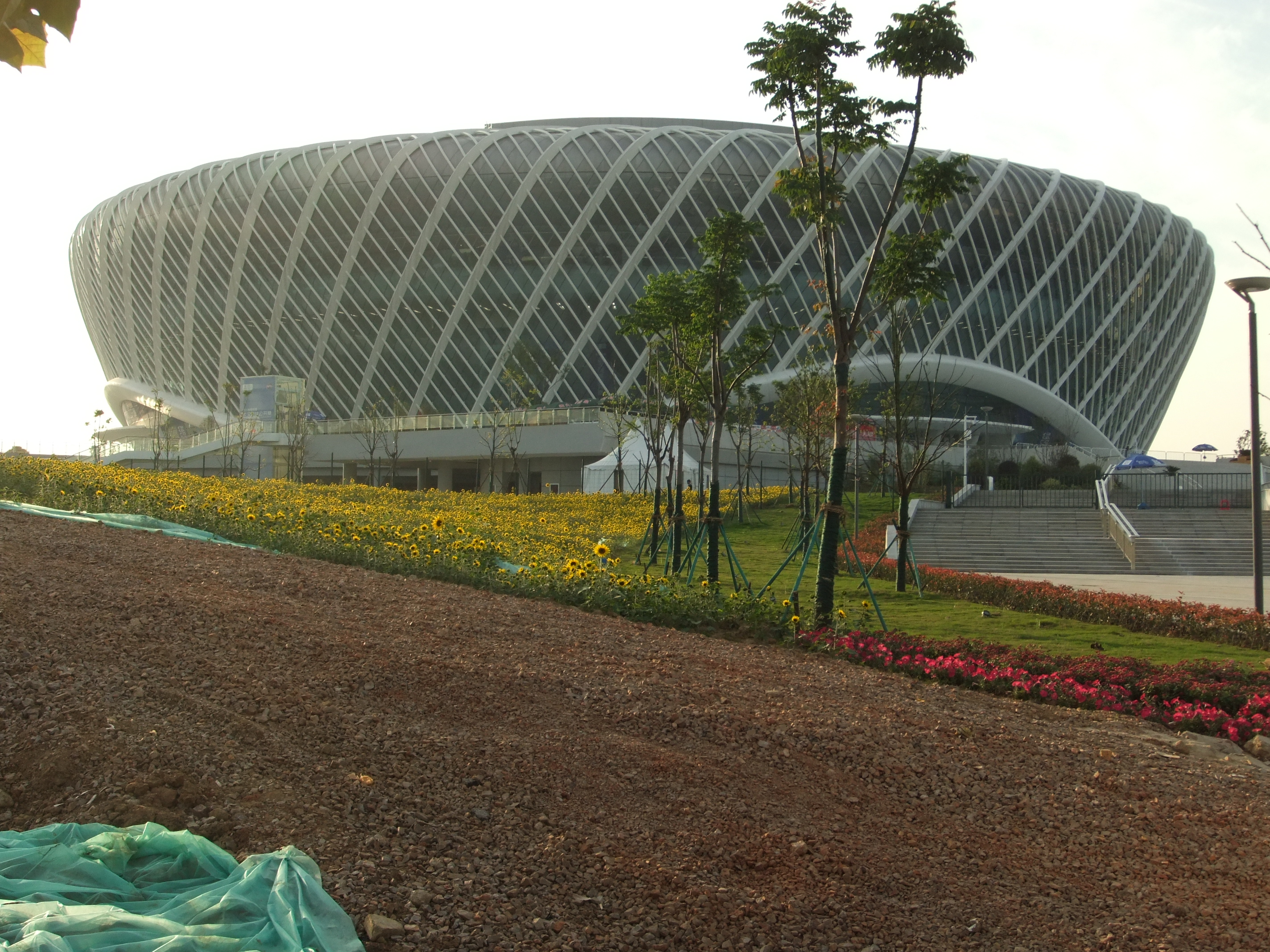
- Interactive map of Optics Valley International Tennis Center
- Location: Wuhan, Hubei Province, China
- Coordinates: 30.4725°N 114.4632°E
- Capacity: 15,000 (Central Court)
- Surface: Hard, outdoors

Construction
- Groundbreaking: 2014
- Built: January 2014
- Opened: September 2015
- Cost: yuan ¥1,5 billion USD $ 225 million (complex); 156 million (central court); EUR € 135 million (central court)

Tenants
- Wuhan Open WTA (Tennis) (2015–present); 2017 League of Legends World Championship

The Optics Valley International Tennis Centre (simplified Chinese: 武汉光谷国际网球中心; traditional Chinese: 武漢光谷國際網球中心; pinyin: Wǔhàn Guānggǔ Guójì Wǎngqiú Zhōngxīn), is a tennis facility located in Wuhan, Hubei Province, China. The center is the venue for the Wuhan Open, a professional tournament on the Women's Tennis Association tour and held annually since 2014.

The facility has a 15,000-seat main stadium named "Central Court", a 5,000-seat annex stadium (Court 1), and 6 standard outdoor hard courts with necessary supporting facilities, covering an area of 103,400 square metres (1,113,000 ft^{2}). The center is located in the Wuhan East Lake New Technology Development Zone, being adjacent to Erfei Hill.

== Gallery ==
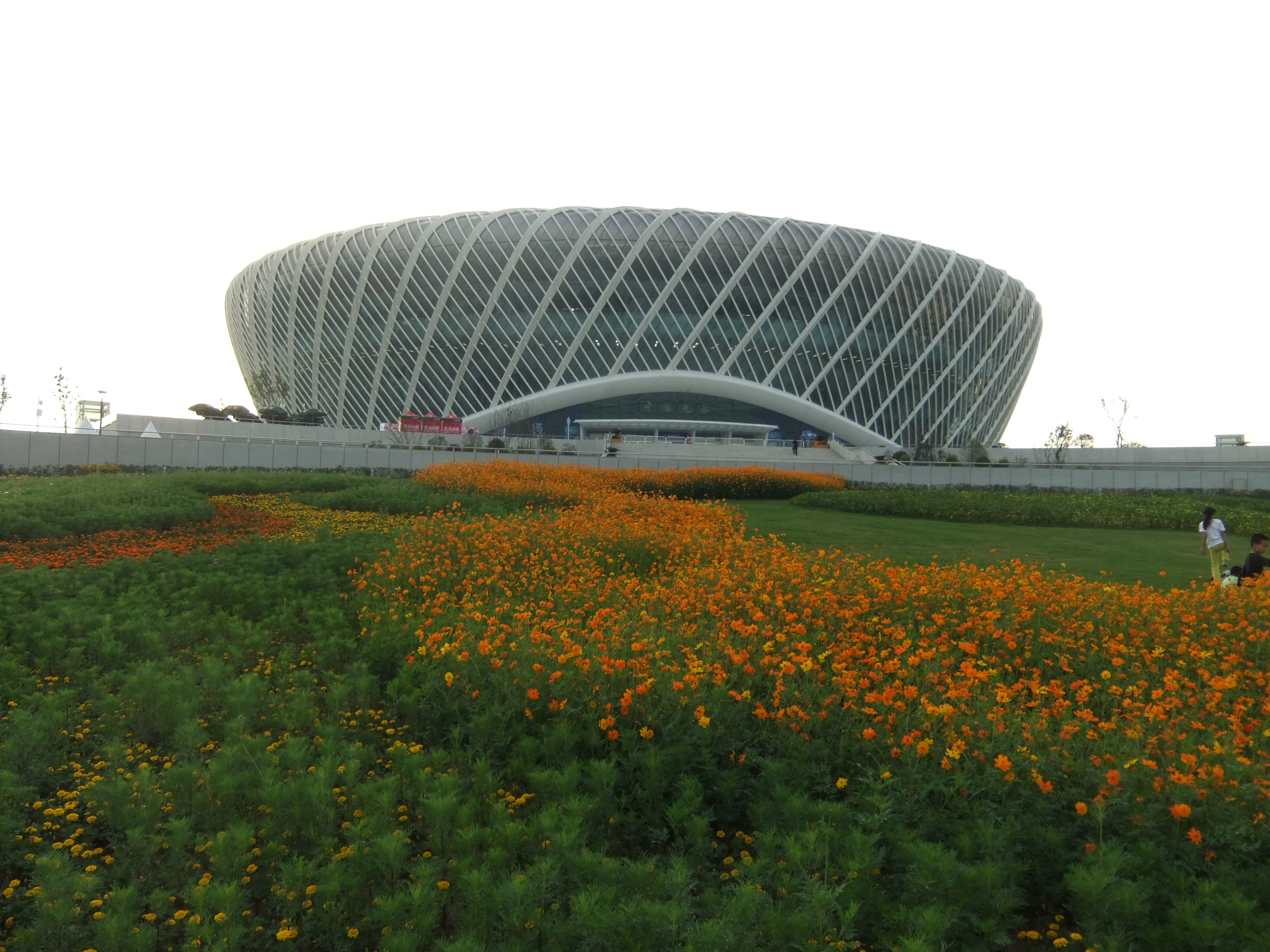

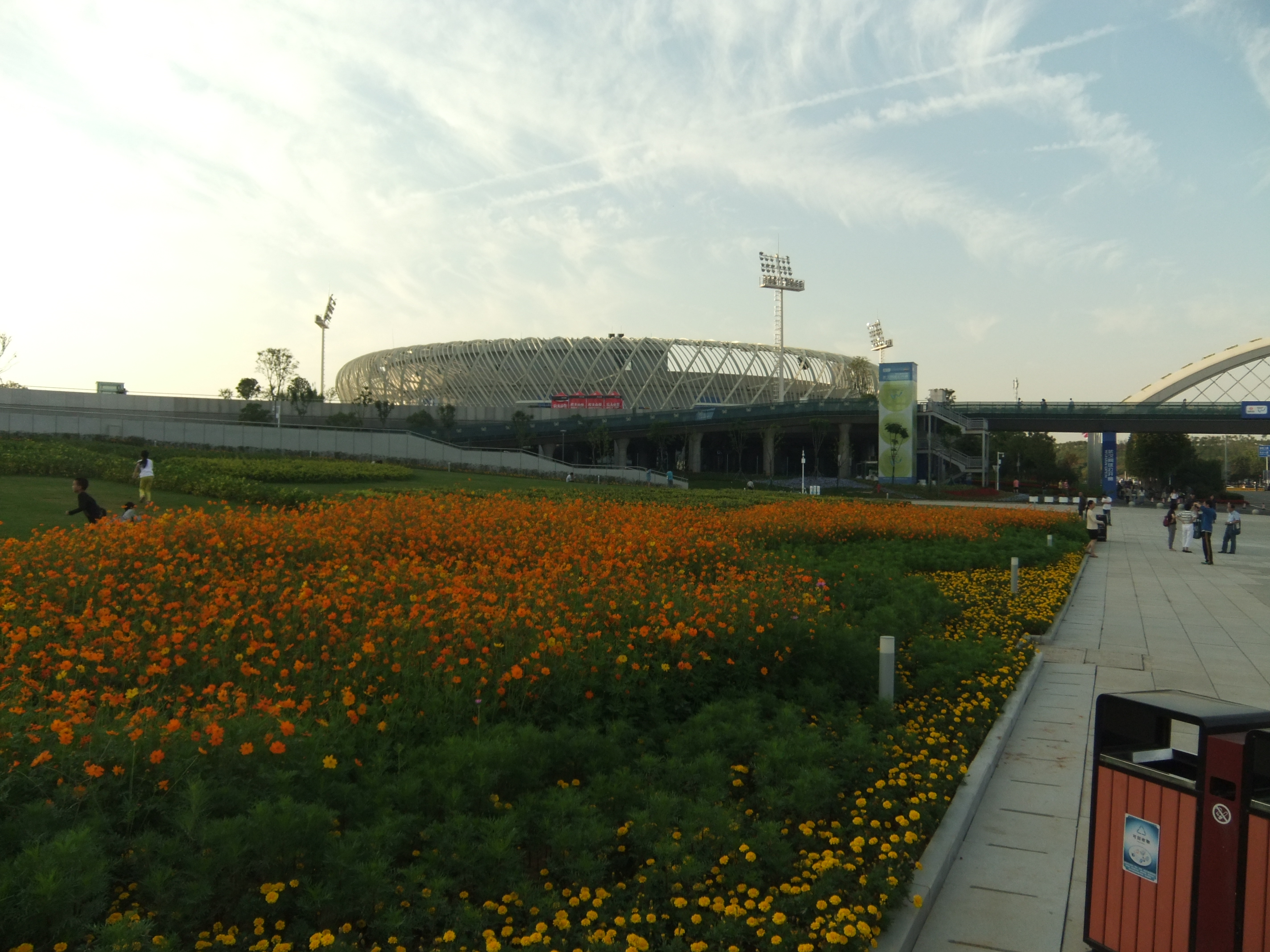

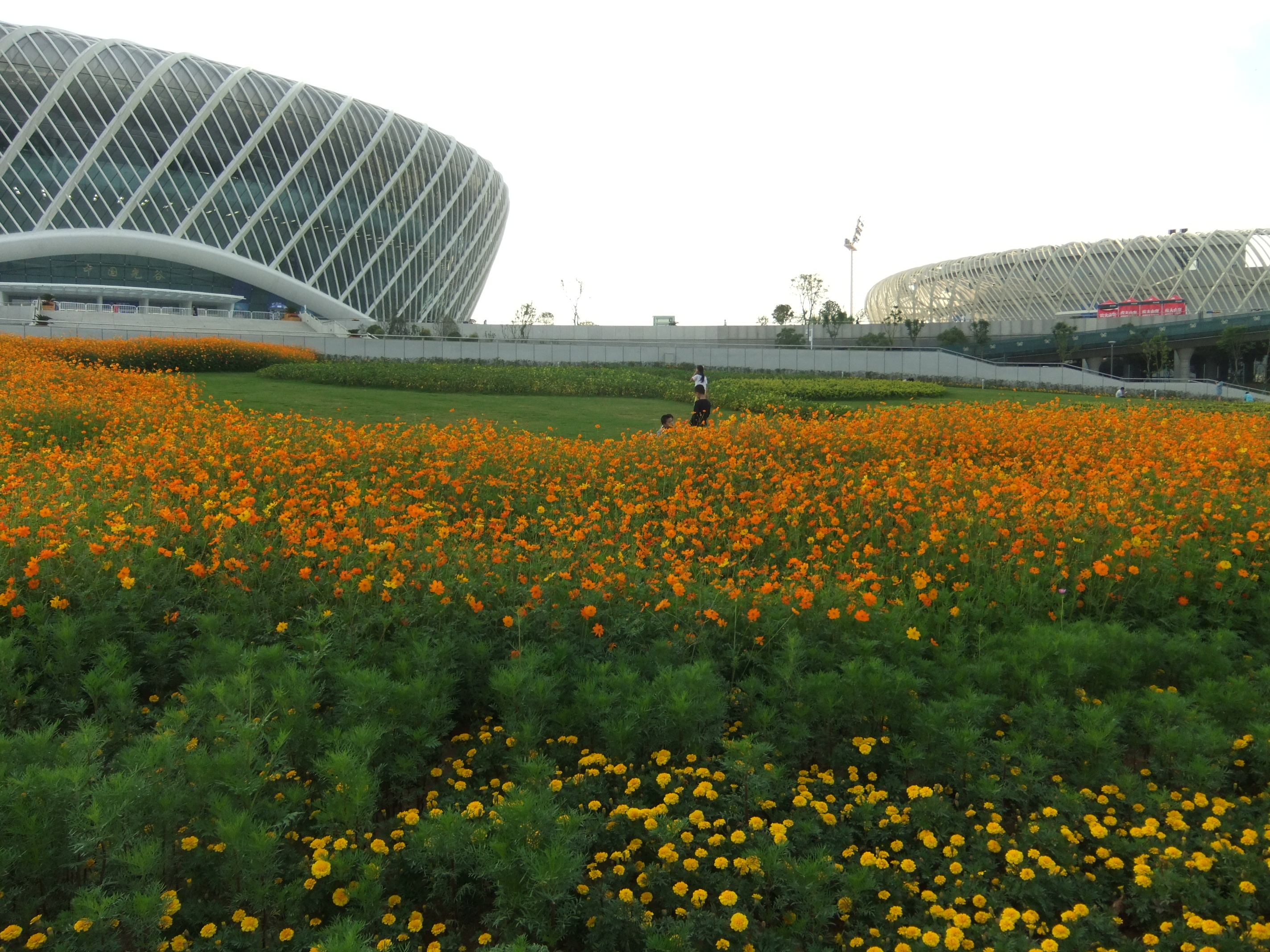

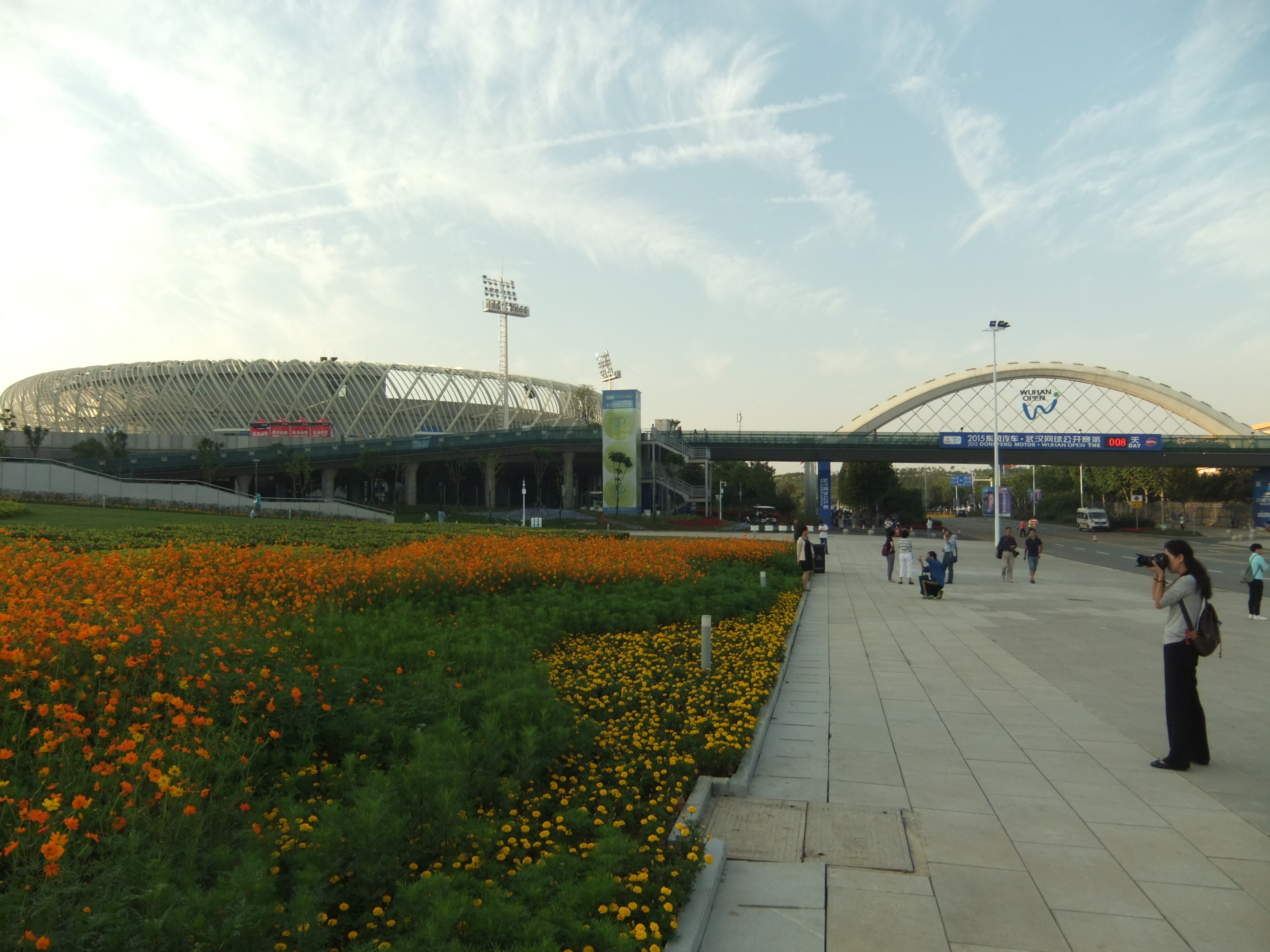

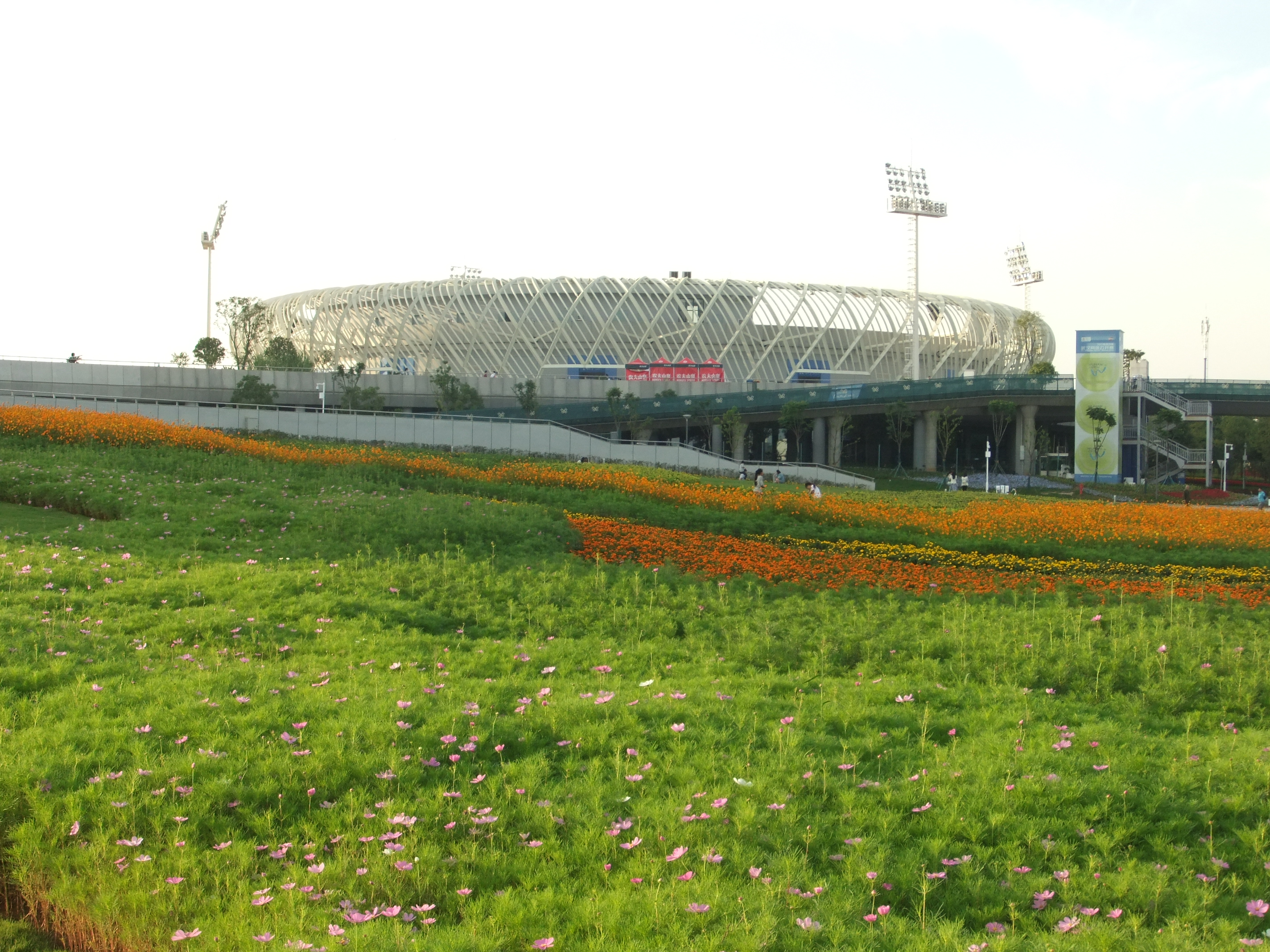

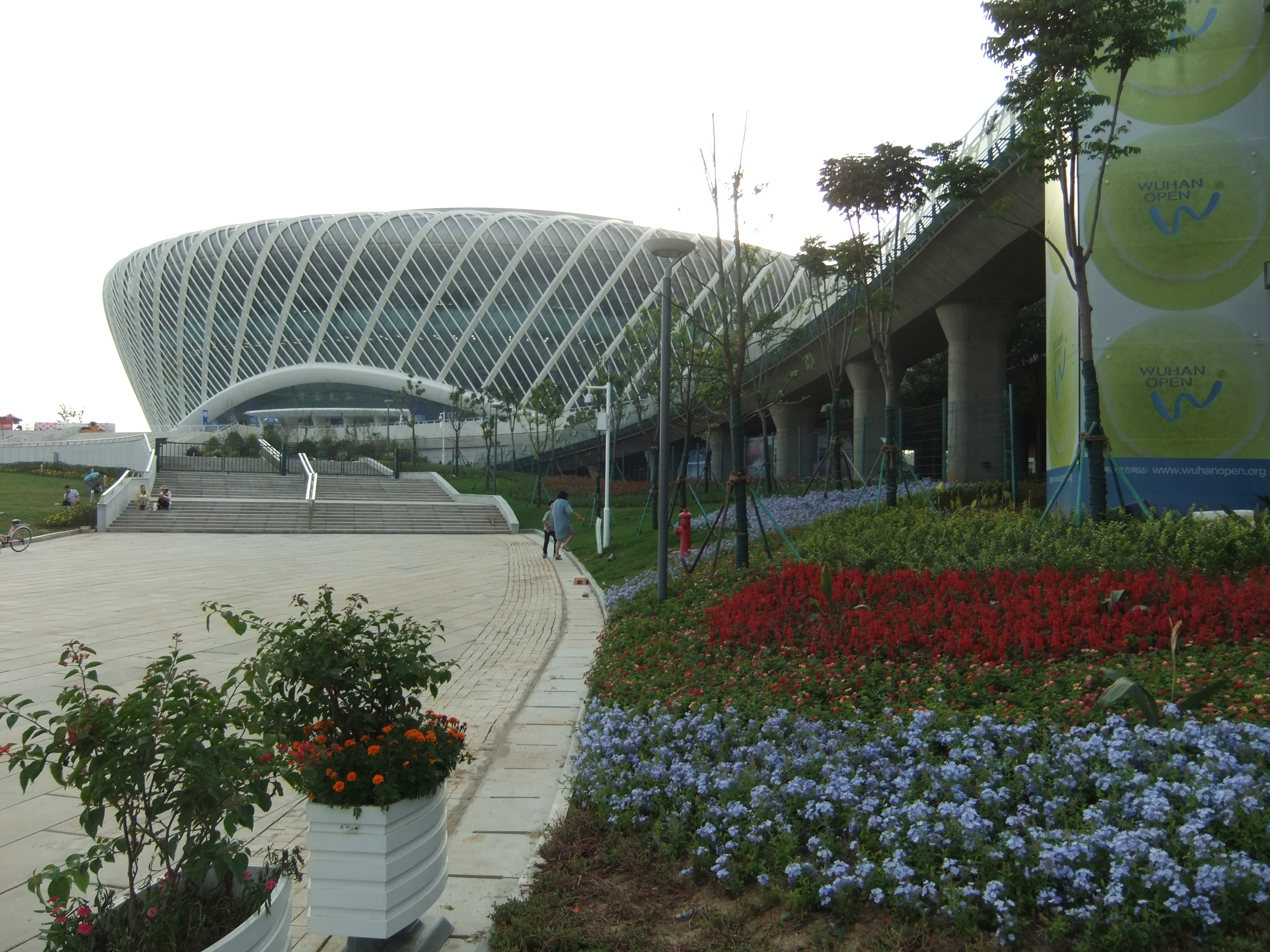

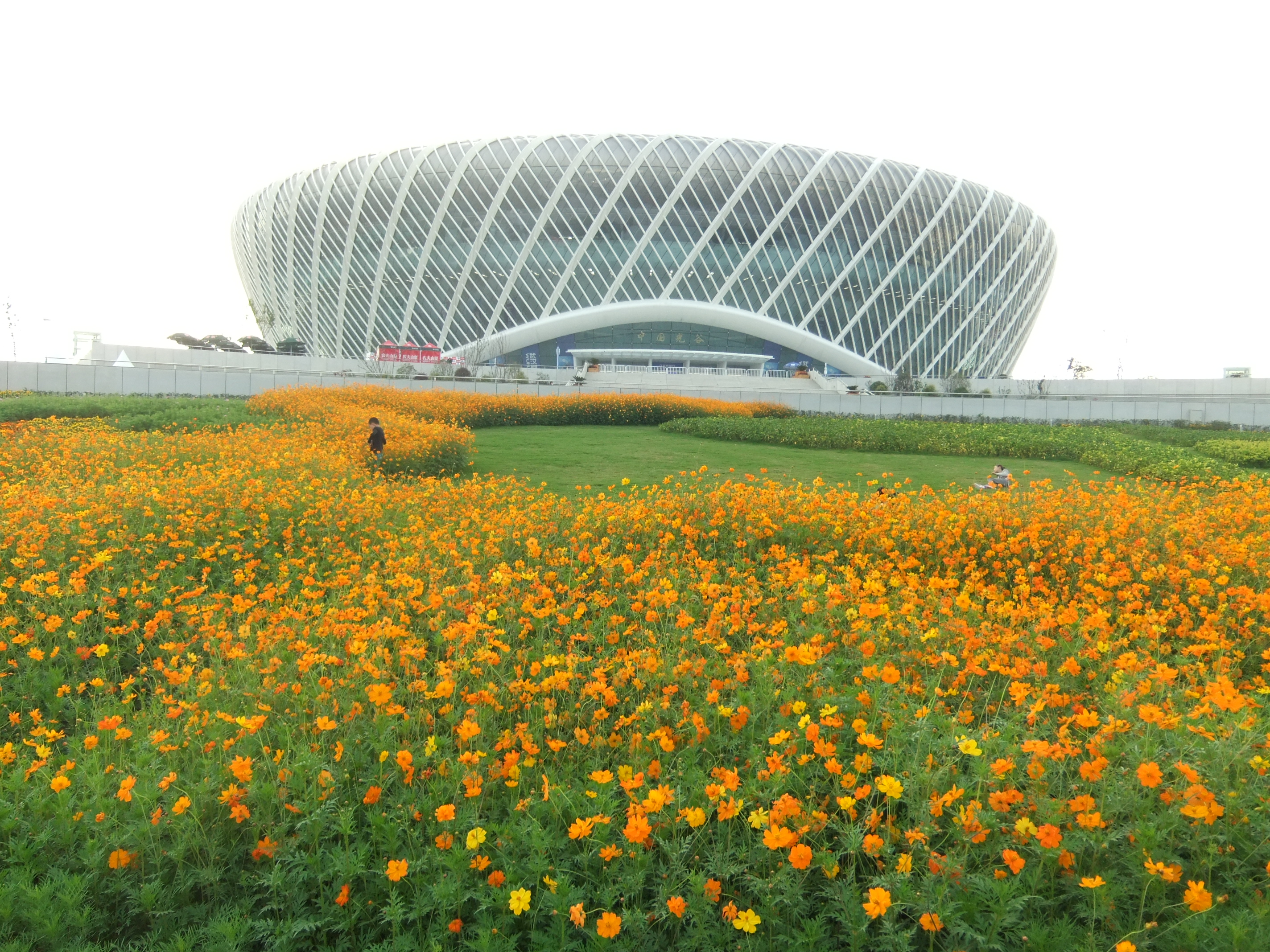

== See also ==
- Official Wikimapia site
- List of tennis stadiums by capacity
