= Jessica Pegula =

American tennis player (born 1994)

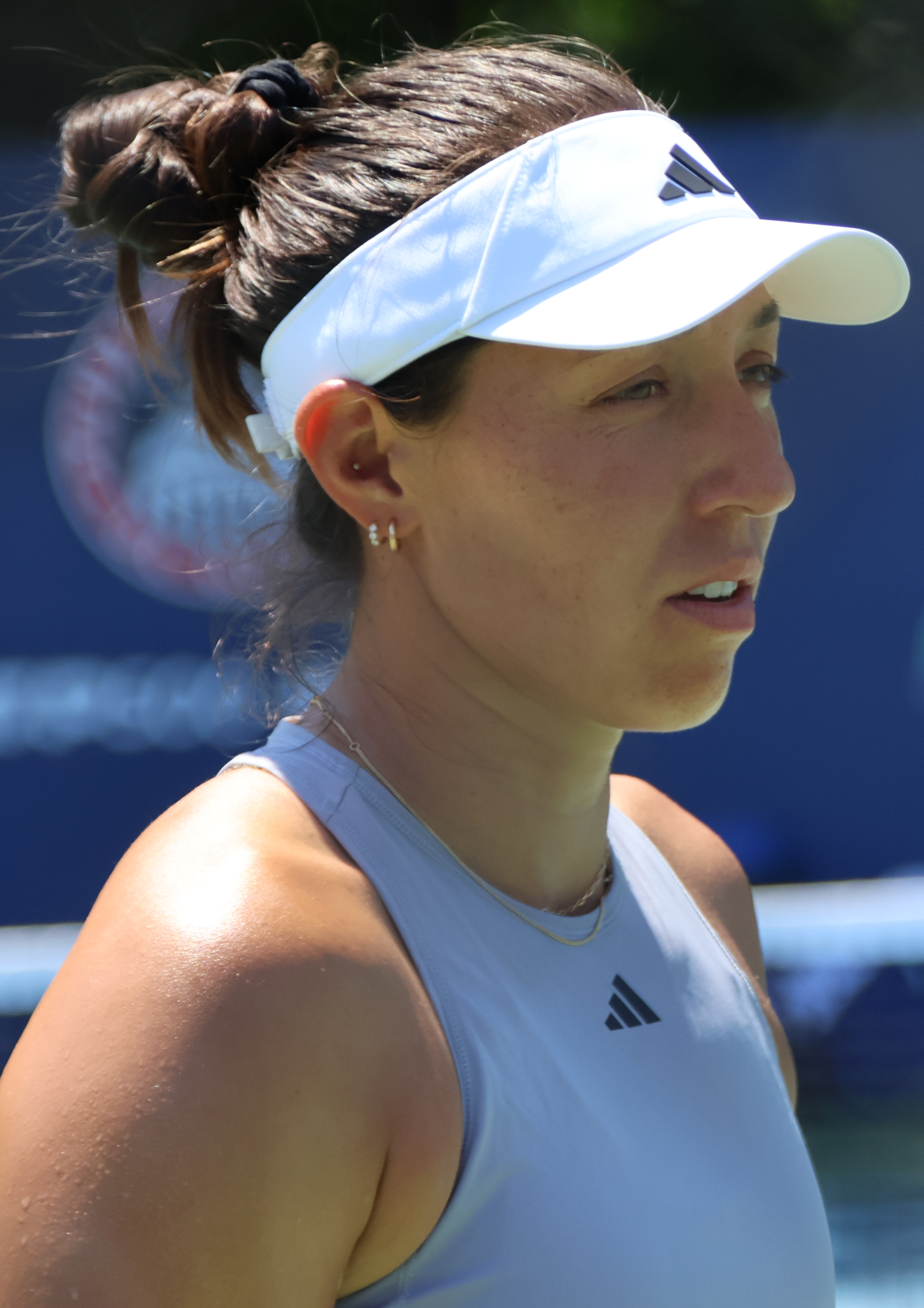
- Pegula in 2025
- Country (sports): United States
- Residence: Boca Raton, Florida, US
- Born: February 24, 1994 (age 32) Buffalo, New York, US
- Height: 5 ft 7 in (170 cm)
- Turned pro: 2009
- Plays: Right-handed (two-handed backhand)
- Coach: Mark Knowles, Mark Merklein (2024–)
- Prize money: US$28,312,854: 14th all-time in earnings

Singles
- Career record: 539–287
- Career titles: 11
- Highest ranking: No. 3 (24 October 2022)
- Current ranking: No. 5 (16 November 2026)

Grand Slam singles results
- Australian Open: SF (2026)
- French Open: QF (2022)
- Wimbledon: QF (2023, 2026)
- US Open: F (2024)

Other tournaments
- Tour Finals: F (2023)
- Olympic Games: 2R (2024)

Doubles
- Career record: 244–158
- Career titles: 7
- Highest ranking: No. 1 (September 11, 2023)
- Current ranking: No. 88 (16 November 2026)

Grand Slam doubles results
- Australian Open: SF (2023)
- French Open: F (2022)
- Wimbledon: QF (2024)
- US Open: QF (2023)

Other doubles tournaments
- Tour Finals: RR (2022, 2023)
- Olympic Games: QF (2021)

Grand Slam mixed doubles results
- Australian Open: 1R (2022, 2023)
- French Open: 1R (2022, 2023)
- Wimbledon: 1R (2021)
- US Open: F (2023)
- Last updated on: 16 November 2026.

Jessica Pegula (born February 24, 1994) is an American professional tennis player. She has a career-high ranking of world No. 3 in singles by the Women's Tennis Association (WTA), achieved in October 2022, and of world No. 1 in doubles, achieved in September 2023. Pegula has won eleven WTA Tour singles titles, including four WTA 1000 titles. She has won seven doubles titles, including three WTA 1000 titles.

Pegula made her WTA Tour main draw debut in 2012, and made her major main draw debut at the 2015 US Open. She won her first Tour title at the 2019 Washington DC Open. In 2021, she reached the quarterfinals at the Australian Open, and the following year won her first WTA 1000 title at the Guadalajara Open and achieved the world No. 3 ranking. In 2023, she finished runner-up at the WTA Finals, and in 2024 finished runner-up at the US Open.

In doubles, Pegula finished runner-up at the 2022 French Open, partnering with Coco Gauff. She ascended to the No. 1 doubles ranking jointly with Gauff in 2023. In mixed doubles, Pegula finished runner-up at the 2023 US Open, partnering with Austin Krajicek.

== Early life ==
Jessica Pegula was born on February 24, 1994 in Buffalo, New York, to Terry Pegula and Kim Pegula. Her father made his fortune in the oil and gas industry, and her parents later became owners of the Buffalo Sabres and Buffalo Bills. He is of Carpatho-Rusyn descent through his paternal grandparents, who emigrated from Hanigovce, in present-day Slovakia. Her mother was born in Seoul, South Korea, and was adopted by an American family at the age of five. In a 2016 interview, Kim Pegula reported that family DNA testing had indicated Russian and English ancestry on Terry's side and suggested Japanese ancestry on her own side, in addition to Korean ancestry. She has two siblings, Kelly and Matthew, and two half-siblings, Michael and Laura, from her father's first marriage.

Pegula began playing tennis at around the age of seven, inspired by her older sister Laura, who played collegiate tennis at the University of Pittsburgh. She initially took lessons as an after-school activity before attracting the attention of coach Billy Stearns, who recognized her potential. Her family subsequently moved to Hilton Head Island, South Carolina, where she trained under Stearns at the Smith Stearns Tennis Academy for approximately five years. She later moved to Florida to continue her tennis development.

== Career ==
=== 2011–2012: Major third round in doubles ===
On August 30, 2011, Pegula was granted a wildcard into the main draw of the US Open doubles tournament, where she was paired with Taylor Townsend. They eventually lost in the third round to the third-seeded team of Vania King and Yaroslava Shvedova. In March 2012, Pegula was handed a wildcard to the qualifying draw in Indian Wells and surprised higher ranked players Bojana Jovanovski and Paula Ormaechea to qualify for the main draw where she lost to Magdaléna Rybáriková in three sets.

=== 2015: Major singles debut, first win ===
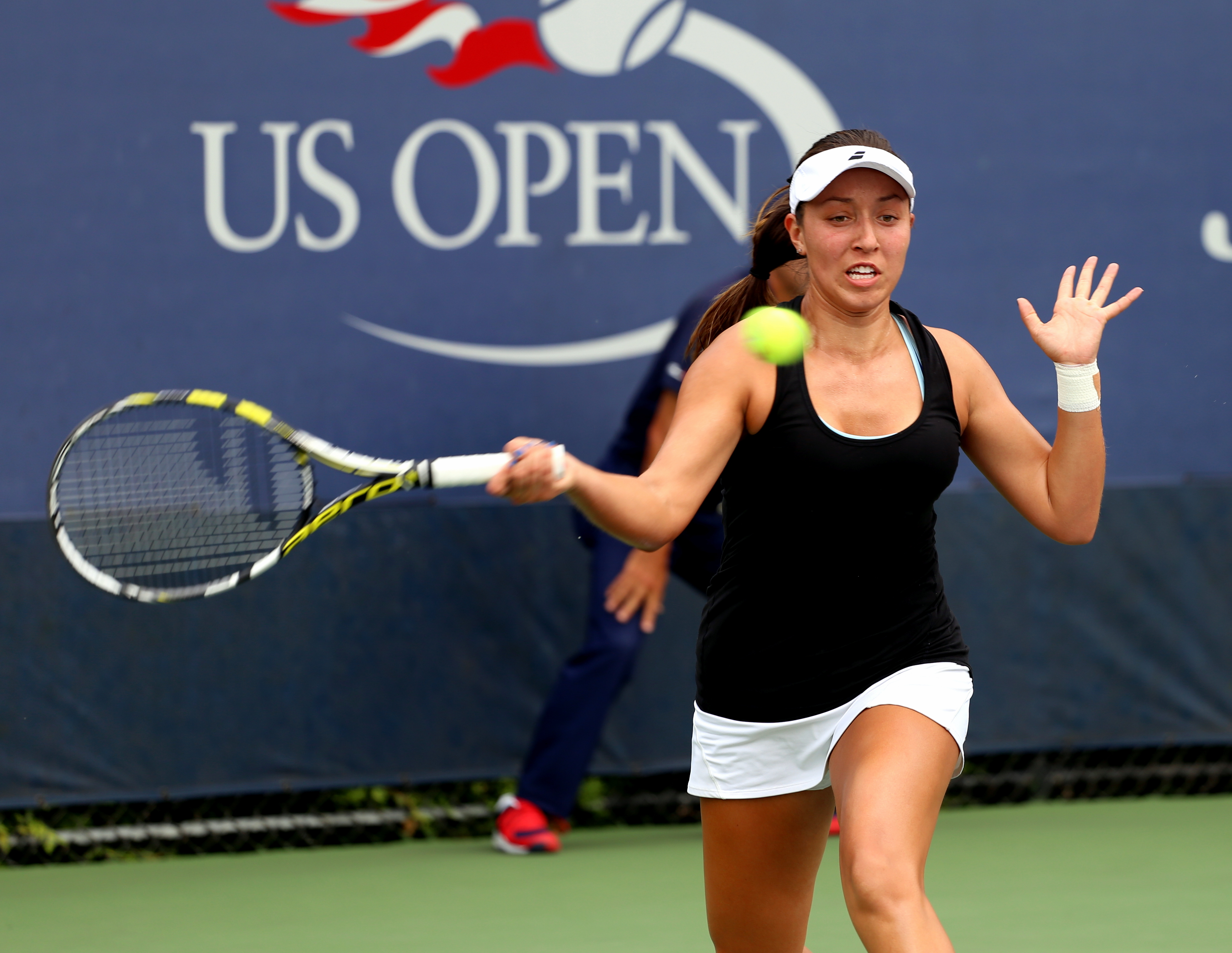
Pegula at the 2015 US Open

Pegula made her major singles debut at the US Open as a qualifier. She defeated Shuko Aoyama, Margarita Gasparyan, and Melanie Oudin to reach the main draw, where she beat Alison Van Uytvanck in the first round. In the second, Pegula was defeated by Dominika Cibulková in three sets.

=== 2018: WTA 250 final ===
In 2018, Pegula reached her first WTA Tour singles final at the Tournoi de Québec in September as a qualifier. She beat Kristýna Plíšková, Ons Jabeur, second seed Petra Martić and fifth seed Sofia Kenin en route to the final, where she lost to eighth seed Pauline Parmentier in straight sets. This brought her ranking back inside the top 200 and helped her finish the year inside the top 125.

=== 2019: WTA 250 title, top 100 ===
Pegula began the year playing primarily on the ITF Circuit, before cracking inside the top 100 in February for the first time in her career. This allowed her to enter several larger WTA Tour events, including in Indian Wells and Miami. Her best result during the early clay court season came in Charleston, where she upset world No. 12, Anastasija Sevastova, en route to the third round. This helped her break inside the top 75 for the first time. She also competed in the main draw of a Grand Slam tournament other than the US Open for the first time. She was defeated in the first round of the French Open by eventual champion Ashleigh Barty, before falling in the same stage at Wimbledon to Mihaela Buzărnescu.

Pegula achieved the best result of her career at the start of the North American hardcourt season when she won her first career singles title at the Washington Open, defeating Camila Giorgi in the final. This took her to a new career-high ranking of world No. 55. Despite failing to win another main-draw match the rest of the season, Pegula finished the year ranked inside the top 100 for the first time, at No. 76.

=== 2020: WTA 250 final ===
Pegula started her 2020 tennis season at the Auckland Open where she defeated CiCi Bellis in the first round. She followed this up with two more straight-set victories over Tamara Zidanšek and Alizé Cornet to reach the semifinals. There she beat Caroline Wozniacki in three sets to advance to her third Tour singles final. Facing off against 23-time Grand Slam singles winner Serena Williams for the first time, Pegula lost in straight sets. She then competed at the Australian Open for the first time, where she was defeated by another American, Taylor Townsend, in straight sets in the first round.

Pegula's next big triumph came at the Cincinnati Open, a Premier 5 tournament. Having already beaten two Russians to qualify for the main draw, she opened her campaign with a straight-sets win over American Jennifer Brady followed by a win over another fellow American, 2019 French Open semifinalist Amanda Anisimova. She then caused a huge upset by defeating fifth seed and world No. 11, Aryna Sabalenka, in the third round, thus advancing to her first quarterfinal at any WTA Premier level event. Her run came to an end with a straight-sets loss to 14th seed Elise Mertens.

At the US Open, Pegula recovered from a set down to record her first Grand Slam main-draw win since the 2015 US Open, defeating Marie Bouzková in a third-set tiebreak. She then beat Kirsten Flipkens to advance to the third round of a Grand Slam event for the first time, where she lost to sixth seed and former world No. 2, Petra Kvitová.

=== 2021: Australian Open quarters, top 20 ===
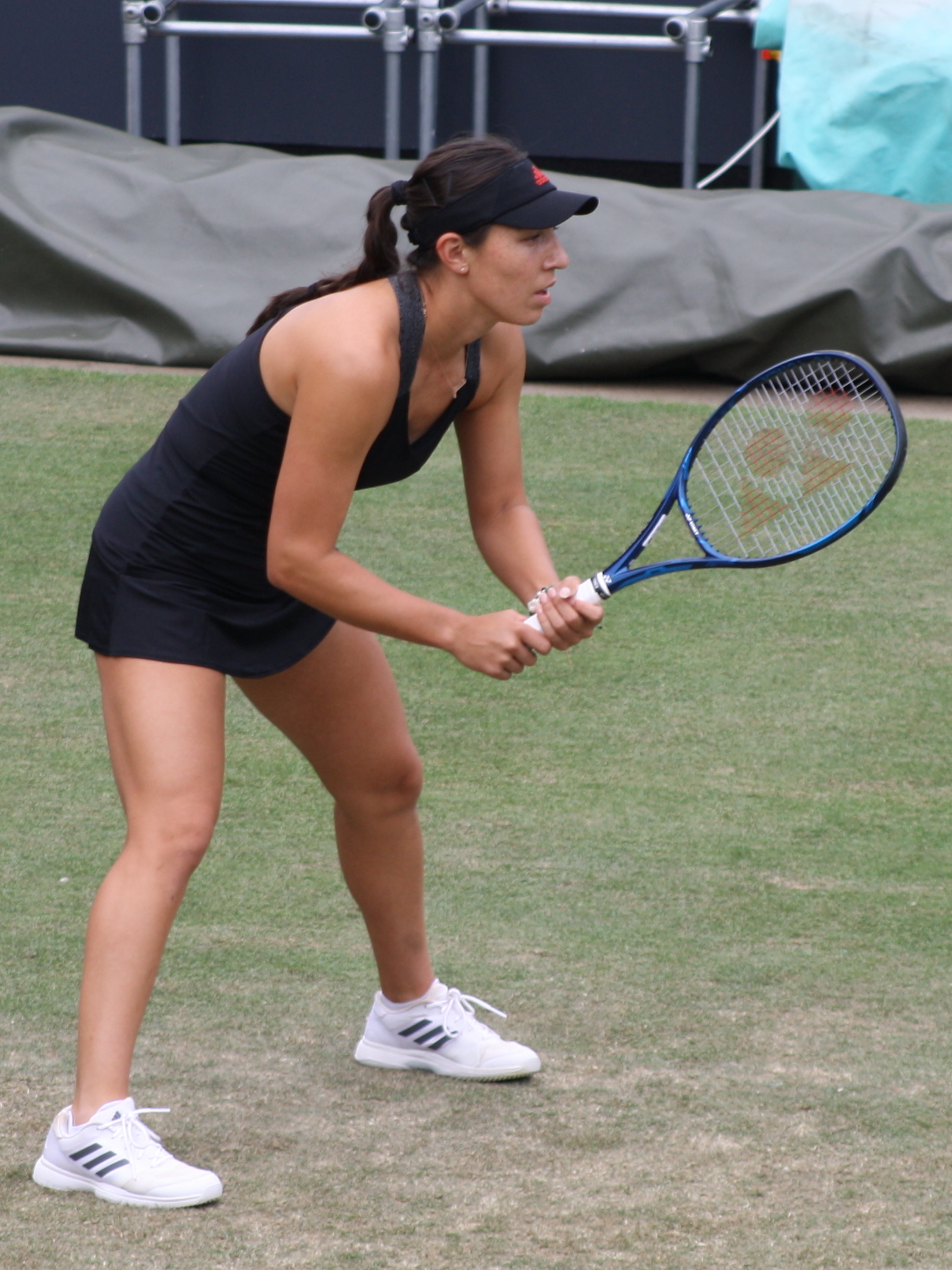
Pegula at the 2021 Bad Homburg Open

Pegula attained success at the Australian Open, defeating former Australian Open champion and 12th seed Victoria Azarenka, Kristina Mladenovic, former US Open champion Samantha Stosur and fifth seed Elina Svitolina to reach her first major quarterfinal where she lost to eventual runner-up, Jennifer Brady, despite winning the first set. This strong showing allowed Pegula to enter top 50 for the first time, and took her to a new career-high ranking of No. 43 in the world.

Later in April, she achieved another career-high of No. 32, after reaching the semifinals at the Qatar Ladies Open as a qualifier where she lost to the eventual champion, Petra Kvitová, and a fourth-round run as a seeded player at the Miami Open, losing to Maria Sakkari in a tight three-set match. Her third-round win over Karolína Plíšková in Miami was the third win in a row in three tournaments over the same player.

In May, at the Italian Open, where she participated for the first time, she recorded the biggest victory of her career over world No. 2, Naomi Osaka, in the second round. This was her fifth top-ten win in 2021. She next prevailed over Ekaterina Alexandrova to set up a quarterfinal match with Petra Martić. Thanks to this great showing at her second WTA 1000 quarterfinal in 2021, after the one at Dubai, she entered top 30 for the first time.

At the French Open, she reached the third round for the first time in her career where she lost to fourth seed Sofia Kenin. At the German Open in Berlin, Pegula reached the quarterfinals defeating for the fourth time Karolína Plíšková in their fourth in a row meeting in 2021.

She reached her third WTA 1000 quarterfinal of 2021 at the Canadian Open edition in Montreal, defeating compatriot Danielle Collins in a close three set match needing six match points to win in a thrilling finish. She then made her first WTA 1000 semifinal and second semifinal for the season, defeating 13th seed Ons Jabeur in 88 minutes. At the US Open, she finished in round three for a second consecutive year. At Indian Wells, she reached her fourth WTA 1000 quarterfinal, defeating world No. 7 (her 7th top-ten win for the season) and fourth seed, Elina Svitolina, before losing to former two-time champion Victoria Azarenka.

=== 2022: Major quarterfinals, WTA 1000 title, singles No. 3 ===
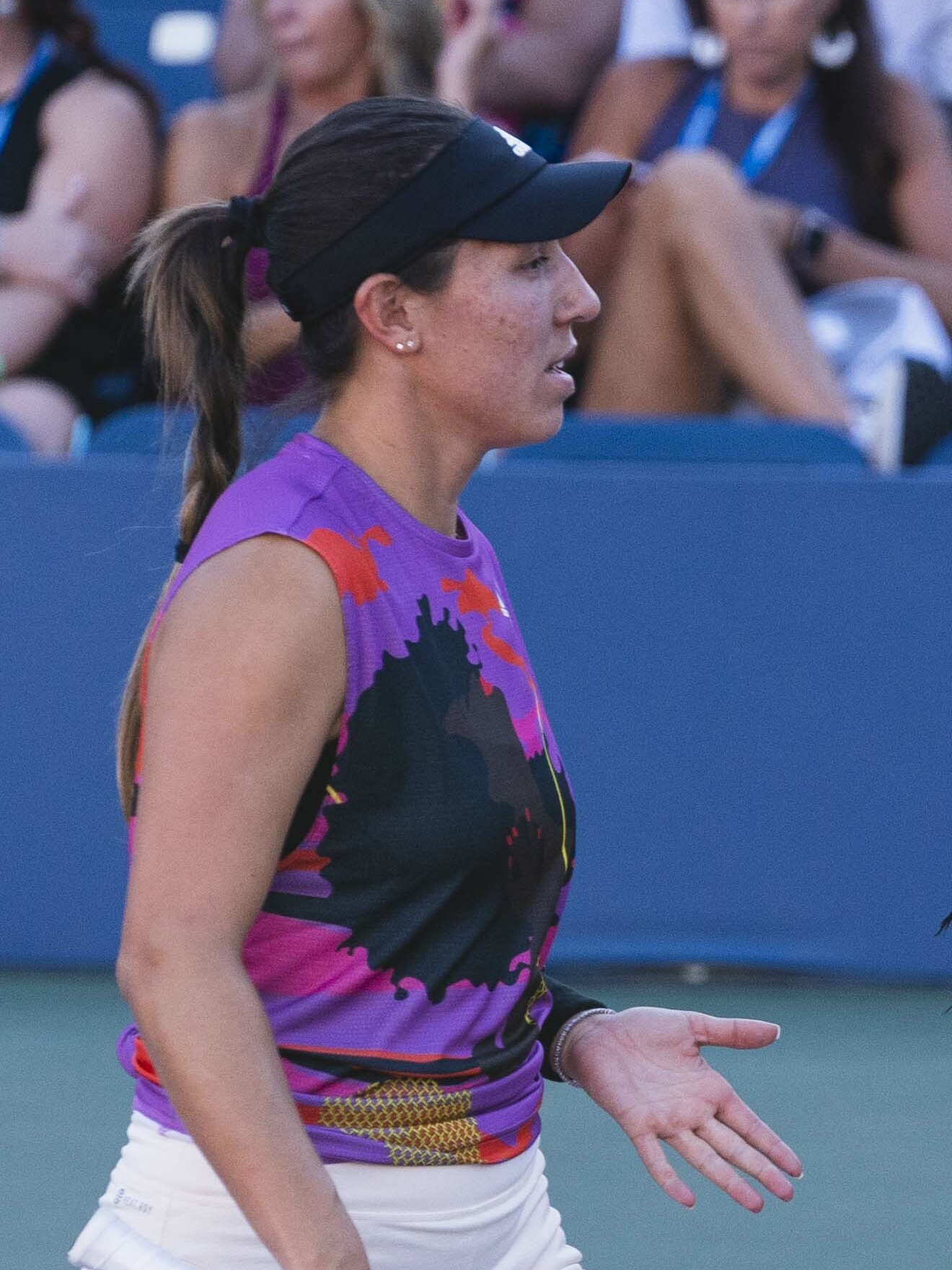
Pegula at the 2022 US Open

Pegula started her season in Melbourne where she lost to Irina-Camelia Begu in the first round of the singles tournament but won her first career doubles title with Asia Muhammad, beating former doubles world No. 1, Sara Errani, and Jasmine Paolini in the final. In Sydney, she lost to Caroline Garcia in the first round.

At the Australian Open, she defeated Anhelina Kalinina, Bernarda Pera, Nuria Párrizas Díaz and fifth seed Maria Sakkari to book her second consecutive quarterfinal at this major. She lost the quarterfinal match to world No. 1 and eventual champion, Ash Barty, but moved to highest rankings in singles (No. 16) and doubles (No. 41) on January 31, 2022.

In Doha, she won her second doubles title (and first at the WTA 1000 level) with Coco Gauff, defeating third seeds Elise Mertens and Veronika Kudermetova in the final. As a result, she set No. 29 in doubles on February 28, 2022.

At the Miami Open, she reached her second WTA 1000 semifinal of her career after two back-to-back retirements, Kalinina in round of 16, and Paula Badosa in the first set of the quarterfinal. In the semifinals, she lost to the eventual champion and upcoming No. 1, Iga Świątek, in straight sets.

Her seventh WTA 1000 quarterfinal came at the Madrid Open by defeating Bianca Andreescu in straight sets. She reached her third semifinal at the WTA 1000-level and second straight for the season defeating first time Madrid quarterfinalist Sara Sorribes Tormo. Next, she defeated Jil Teichmann for her first WTA 1000 final and become the third American to do so, after Venus Williams (2010) and Serena Williams (2012 and 2013) in Madrid, where she lost to Ons Jabeur in three sets. As a result, she improved her career-high to No. 11 on May 9. Pegula reached the third round of the Italian Open as well, but lost to Aryna Sabalenka in straight sets.

Seeded 11th at the French Open, Pegula advanced to the quarterfinals for the first time at this major, defeating former world No. 12, Wang Qiang, Anhelina Kalinina, 2021 French Open semifinalist and 24th seed Tamara Zidanšek, and Irina-Camelia Begu. She lost to top seed and eventual champion, Iga Świątek, in the quarterfinals. As a result, she broke into the top 10 in the singles rankings for the first time, at world No. 8, on June 6, 2022. She also entered her first major final in doubles, partnering with Gauff. As a result, she reached the top 15 in the doubles rankings. Seeded eighth at Wimbledon, she advanced to the third round for the first time, before losing to Petra Martić in straight sets. Following Wimbledon, she set a new career-high of world No. 7 on July 18, 2022, becoming the American number-one-player, one spot ahead of Danielle Collins.

As a top-seeded pair, partnering Erin Routliffe, she won her third doubles title at the Washington Open defeating fourth seeds Caty McNally and Anna Kalinskaya.

Seeded seventh at the Canadian Open, she reached back-to-back semifinals in singles, for the fourth time at the WTA 1000-level in her career and third for the season, defeating defending champion Camila Giorgi and Yulia Putintseva, before losing to Simona Halep. Seeded third in doubles at the same tournament, she also reached the semifinals with Gauff defeating fifth seeds Desirae Krawczyk and Demi Schuurs. They defeated Madison Keys / Sania Mirza in the semifinals and Nicole Melichar / Ellen Perez in the final to win their second WTA 1000 title together. As a result, Pegula reached top 10 in the doubles rankings, at world No. 8.

At the Cincinnati Open, she reached back-to-back quarterfinals defeating tenth seed Emma Raducanu, her fourth WTA 1000 quarterfinal of the season.

Seeded eighth at the US Open, she reached the fourth round, defeating Viktorija Golubic, Aliaksandra Sasnovich, and qualifier Yuan Yue. Next she defeated 21st seed Petra Kvitová to reach her first quarterfinal at her home Grand Slam championship and the third major quarterfinal of the season, where she lost to world No. 1 Świątek for the third time this year. Despite the result, she moved to world No. 5, on September 12, 2022. On October 13 and 14, 2022, she qualified for the 2022 WTA Finals in singles and doubles with Gauff, respectively, becoming the first American to qualify for the WTA Finals since Sloane Stephens in 2018 and the first American to qualify in both singles in doubles since Serena and Venus Williams in 2009. At the San Diego Open, Pegula lost to Świątek in a US Open rematch in the semifinals, but won the doubles title with Gauff, their third title of the season together and Pegula's fifth doubles title overall. As a result, she reached a new career-high doubles ranking of No. 4, on October 17, 2022.

At the Guadalajara Open, she reached her second final at the WTA 1000 level defeating four former Grand Slam champions Elena Rybakina, Bianca Andreescu, and Sloane Stephens in the quarterfinals, and Victoria Azarenka in the semifinals. She defeated fourth seed Maria Sakkari in straight sets to win the second and biggest singles title of her career, becoming the first American woman to win a WTA 1000 title since Madison Keys in 2019. At the same tournament, she also reached the quarterfinals in doubles with Gauff. As a result, she achieved new career-high rankings of world No. 3, in singles and in doubles, on October 24, 2022.

On her debut at the WTA Finals, Pegula lost all her matches of the group stage, winning only one set in three matches. At the same tournament, she and partner Gauff surprisingly failed to win a single match and also finished last in the round-robin stage of doubles. Nonetheless, she finished her best season to date ranked No. 3 in singles and No. 6 in doubles, one of only three women (along with Gauff and Kudermetova) to finish inside the top 10 in both disciplines.

=== 2023: Major quarterfinals, WTA 1000 title, doubles No. 1 ===
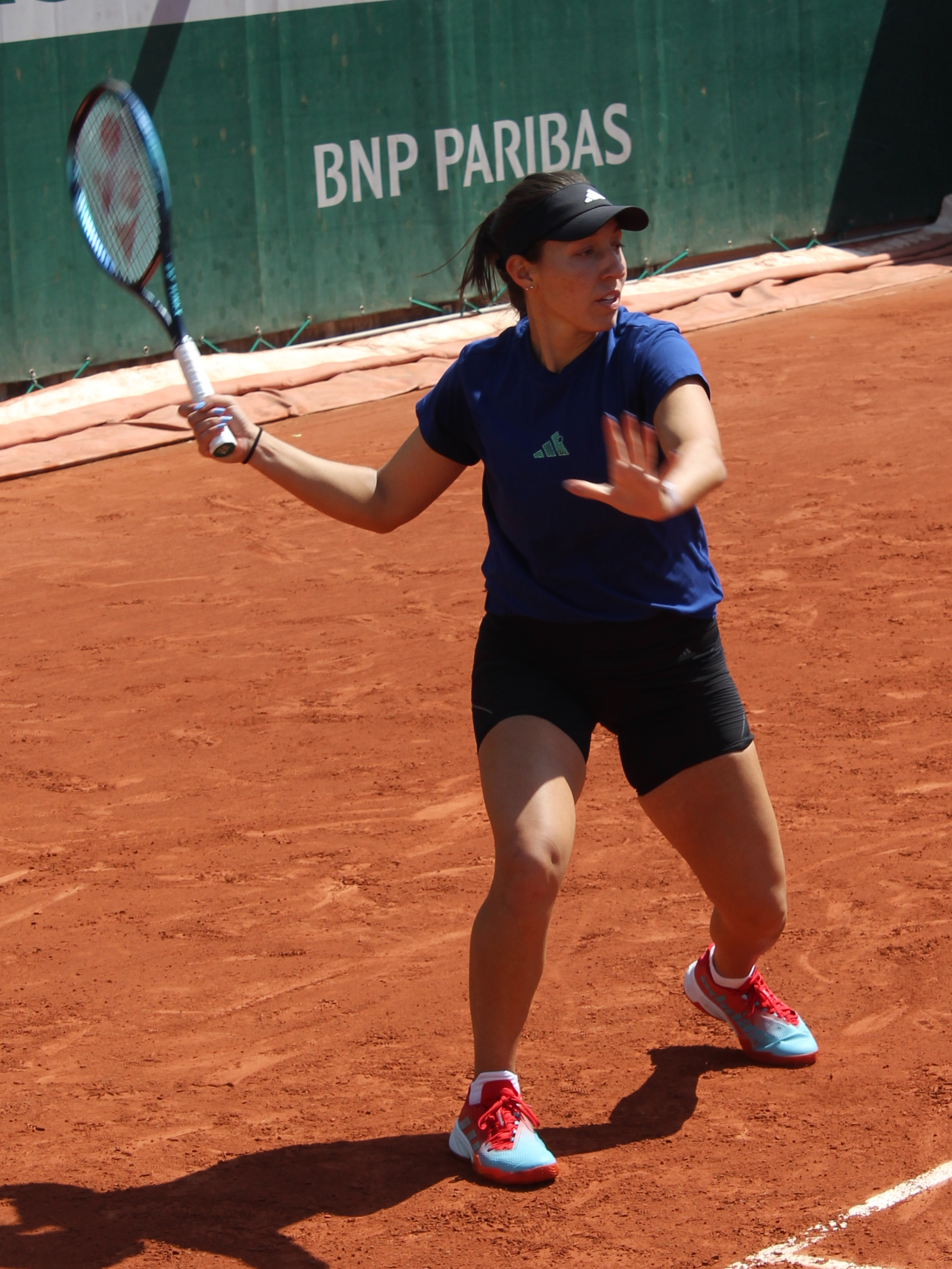
Pegula at the 2023 French Open

Pegula began her season playing at the inaugural edition of the United Cup. After dropping her opening match in Group C to Petra Kvitová, she bounced back to defeat Laura Siegemund. She then beat Harriet Dart in the first knockout stage before scoring the biggest win of her career with a straight sets victory over Iga Świątek, her first win over a current world No. 1 and first against the Pole since the 2019 Washington Open. In the finals, she beat 2022 French Open semifinalist Martina Trevisan to help the United States win the first ever United Cup title.

Coming off the heels of her win over Świątek and consistency throughout the 2022 season, Pegula was considered one of the favorites for the Australian Open title. She breezed through her first three matches with straight set wins over Jaqueline Cristian, Aliaksandra Sasnovich, and Marta Kostyuk. In the fourth round, Pegula faced off against 2021 French Open champion Barbora Krejčíková for the first time, defeating the 20th seed in straight sets to advance to her third consecutive Australian Open quarterfinal. However, she was unable to advance past that stage once more, being defeated by former champion Victoria Azarenka in straight sets. Pegula also played doubles with Coco Gauff; seeded second, the pairing dropped only one set en route to the semifinals, before falling to the tenth seeds, Shuko Aoyama and Ena Shibahara.

In February, Pegula reached the finals of the Qatar Ladies Open in both singles and doubles. It was Pegula's first WTA 500 singles final. She defeated former French Open champion Jeļena Ostapenko and world No. 2, Petra Kvitová en route, before losing to top-ranked Iga Świątek, in straight sets. In doubles, she and Gauff defended their doubles title, defeating second seeds Lyudmyla Kichenok and Jelena Ostapenko in three sets. Pegula earned 305 singles and 470 doubles ranking points. In Dubai, she reached her first WTA 1000 semifinal for the season defeating Viktoriya Tomova, Ana Bogdan and Karolína Muchová by walkover, before losing to eventual champion Krejčíková.

At the Indian Wells Open, she reached the fourth round defeating 27th seed Anastasia Potapova coming from a set down. She repeated the feat at Miami where again she came back from a set down and won against 26th seed Potapova, saving two match points, to reach this time the semifinals, after several match postponements due to a four hours rain delay. She became the first American woman to reach back to back semifinals in Miami since Serena Williams in 2014 and 2015. In doubles at the same tournament, she won her fifth overall and third WTA 1000 team title with her partner, Coco Gauff. They became the first all-American duo to win the Miami Open doubles title in 22 years, defeating Leylah Fernandez and Taylor Townsend in the final. At the WTA 1000 Madrid Open, Pegula and Gauff reached again the final where they lost to Azarenka and Beatriz Haddad Maia. The match was followed by controversy as none of the participating players were allowed to make a speech on the podium during the awards ceremony. The organizers subsequently apologized for the mistake. At the next WTA 1000 in Rome, the pair played their third consecutive final. As a result, Pegula reached a new career-high of No. 2 in doubles. Afflicted by a bout of food poisoning just days before the French Open, Pegula was upset by the 28th seed Elise Mertens in the third round in Paris, but reached the semifinals in doubles with Gauff, before falling to the tenth seeds, Leylah Fernandez and Taylor Townsend.

At Wimbledon, she reached the quarterfinals and became just the fifth American to do so at all four majors in the last 25 years, after notching a straight-sets fourth-round win over Ukrainian Lesia Tsurenko. In the quarterfinals, Pegula lost to the eventual champion, Markéta Vondroušová, despite leading in the third set.

Seeded fourth in Montreal, she reached her third consecutive Canadian Open semifinal by beating Yulia Putintseva, Jasmine Paolini and seventh seed Coco Gauff. Then she beat Iga Świątek for the second time in the season, in three sets, to enter her third WTA 1000 final in which she defeated 15th seed Liudmila Samsonova in 49 minutes, to win her second WTA 1000 and third singles title.

Following the US Open where she reached the fourth round in singles (losing to close friend Madison Keys) and the quarterfinals in doubles for the first time (falling to the reigning French Open champions Hsieh Su-wei and Wang Xinyu), she became the world No. 1 in doubles for the first time. At the same tournament, she also reached the mixed doubles final with ATP doubles world No. 1, Austin Krajicek, which they lost to Anna Danilina and Harri Heliövaara, in straight sets.

At the beginning of the Asian swing, she reached the final of the WTA 500 Japan Women's Open defeating Maria Sakkari, before losing to Veronika Kudermetova. She won her second singles title of the season and fourth overall at the Korea Open.

Jessica and Coco returned to top doubles ranking on October 23, after qualifying for the 2023 WTA Finals as a pair and also individually, becoming the first players to qualify in both disciplines in back-to-back years since Sara Errani in 2012–13. At the WTA Finals, where she qualified for a second year in a row, she recorded her first win ever at this tournament, and her 40th singles hardcourt win over Elena Rybakina in straight sets, the most of anyone in the season. It was a fourth straight win over a top 10 player extending her personal best. In her second match, she defeated the world No. 1 player Aryna Sabalenka also in straight sets, her third win against a number-one player in the season and in her career. It was her 43rd season win with 5+ break point conversions, the most of anyone, and her fifth straight top 10 win, the first American on record since Sloane Stephens in 2018. She also became the first American to claim three wins in a season against the WTA's No. 1 since Serena Williams in 2012. Since 2000, Pegula was fourth to achieve the feat after Williams, Lindsay Davenport, and Jennifer Capriati. As a result, she qualified for the semifinals. Next, she defeated Sakkari, her sixth straight top-10 win, in straight sets in her third match in a row with this result, improving to 50–0 in 2023 after winning the opening set, becoming the third player to finish a season with 50+-0, excluding retirements, after Lindsay Davenport and Viktoria Azarenka. In the semifinals, she defeated Gauff in one hour in straight sets, her seventh straight top-10 win, and reached the biggest final of her career. She became the first player in the Open Era to play the No. 1, No. 2, No. 3 and No. 4 player in the same tournament. In the final, she lost to world No. 2, Iga Świątek, in 59 minutes.

=== 2024: US Open final, WTA 1000 title ===
In January, following the Australian Open where she exited in the second round, she split with her coach David Witt, with whom she began working in 2019. She withdrew from the Middle Eastern swing in February, due to a neck injury.

She returned to the tour at the San Diego Open with a new coaching team and reached the semifinals. At the same tournament in doubles with Desirae Krawczyk, she reached the final, which they lost to the duo Melichar-Martinez / Perez in straight sets. In Indian Wells, she lost her debut match to Anna Blinkova and in doubles, she reached the quarterfinals with her usual partner Gauff. At the next WTA 1000 in Miami, she reached the quarterfinals in singles defeating compatriot and 20th seed Emma Navarro before losing to 14th seed Ekaterina Alexandrova.

After withdrawing from the French Open due to neck and back injuries, she won her fifth title at the WTA 500 Berlin Ladies Open in June on grass, defeating top seed Gauff in the semifinals, and then Anna Kalinskaya in the final in a tight three-setter with two tiebreaks. In July, Pegula went out in the second round at Wimbledon losing to Wang Xinyu.

She defended her title at the Canadian Open in Toronto, defeating Karolína Plíšková, qualifier Ashlyn Krueger, Peyton Stearns, 14th seed Diana Shnaider and Amanda Anisimova in the final. She reached another WTA 1000 final at the Cincinnati Open with wins over Karolina Muchová, Leylah Fernandez, qualifier Taylor Townsend, and Paula Badosa. She lost to Aryna Sabalenka in the final.

At the US Open, she defeated Shelby Rogers in her final career match, Sofia Kenin, and Jéssica Bouzas Maneiro in 70 minutes and Diana Shnaider without losing a set in all matches, to reach her seventh Grand Slam quarterfinal. She defeated Świątek in straight sets and Karolína Muchová in three sets in her first singles major semifinal. However, she lost to world No. 2, Aryna Sabalenka, in the championship match.

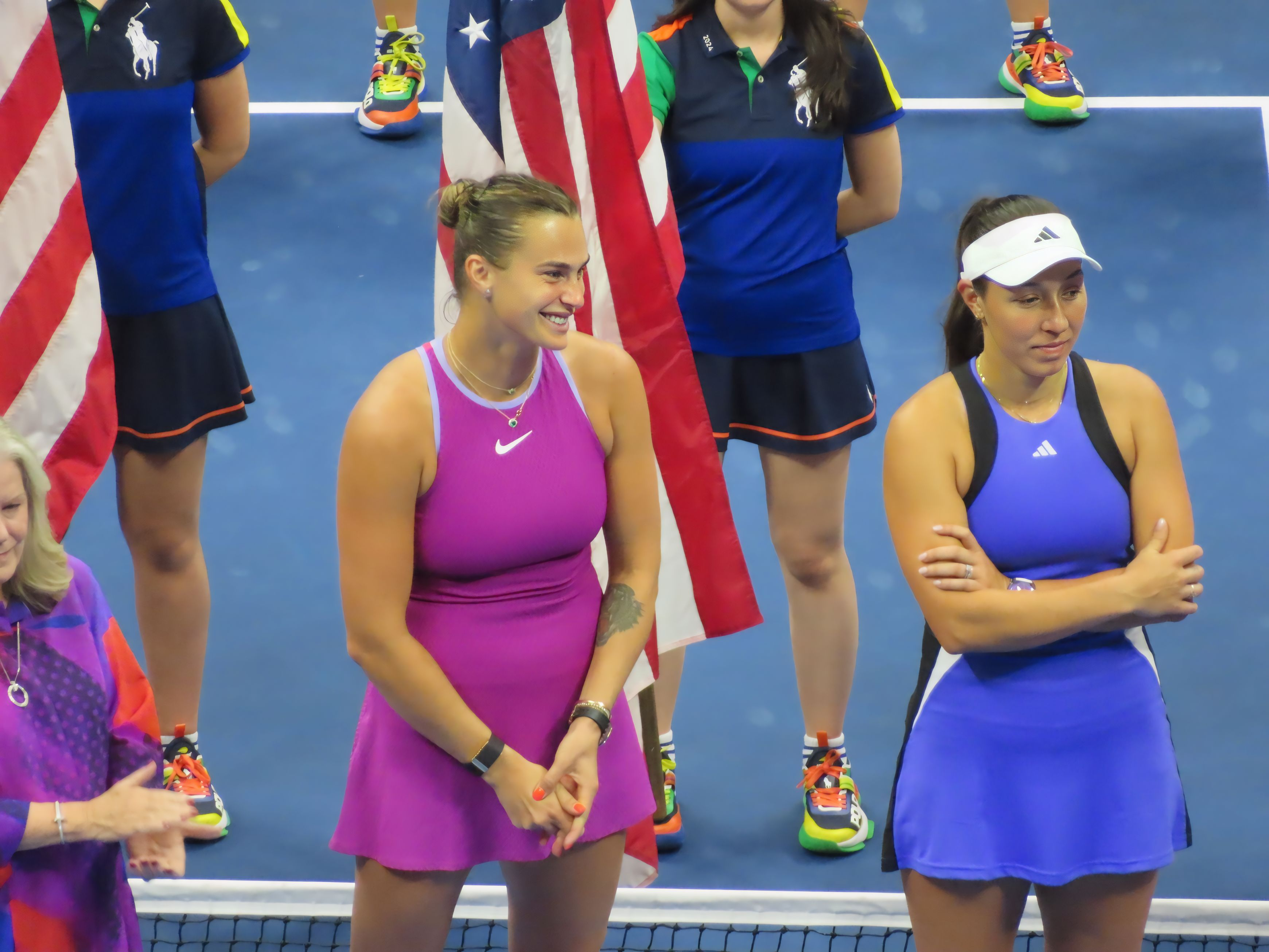
Pegula with Sabalenka at the 2024 US Open singles final award ceremony

Partnering with Asia Muhammad, she was runner-up in the doubles at the Wuhan Open, losing to Anna Danilina and Irina Khromacheva in the final.

At the WTA Finals in November, Pegula was eliminated, after losing her first two group matches against Coco Gauff and Barbora Krejčíková. She then withdrew from the event before her final contest with Iga Świątek due to a knee injury.

=== 2025: US Open semifinal ===
Pegula started her 2025 season at the Adelaide International, reaching the final which she lost to Madison Keys in three sets. At the Australian Open, she went out in the third round at the hands of Olga Danilović.

In February, Pegula won her first title of the season at the ATX Open, defeating McCartney Kessler in the final. At the WTA 1000 event in Miami, she defeated wildcard entrant Alexandra Eala in the semifinals, but lost the final to world No. 1 Aryna Sabalenka.

As top seed, Pegula won her first clay court title at the Charleston Open, overcoming Sofia Kenin in the final. She reached the fourth round at the French Open, where she lost to wildcard entrant and eventual semifinalist Lois Boisson.

Moving on to the grass court season in June, Pegula defeated Iga Świątek in straight sets in the final at the Bad Homburg Open. Just three days later at Wimbledon, she lost in the first round to Elisabetta Cocciaretto in straight sets in a match lasting just 58 minutes.

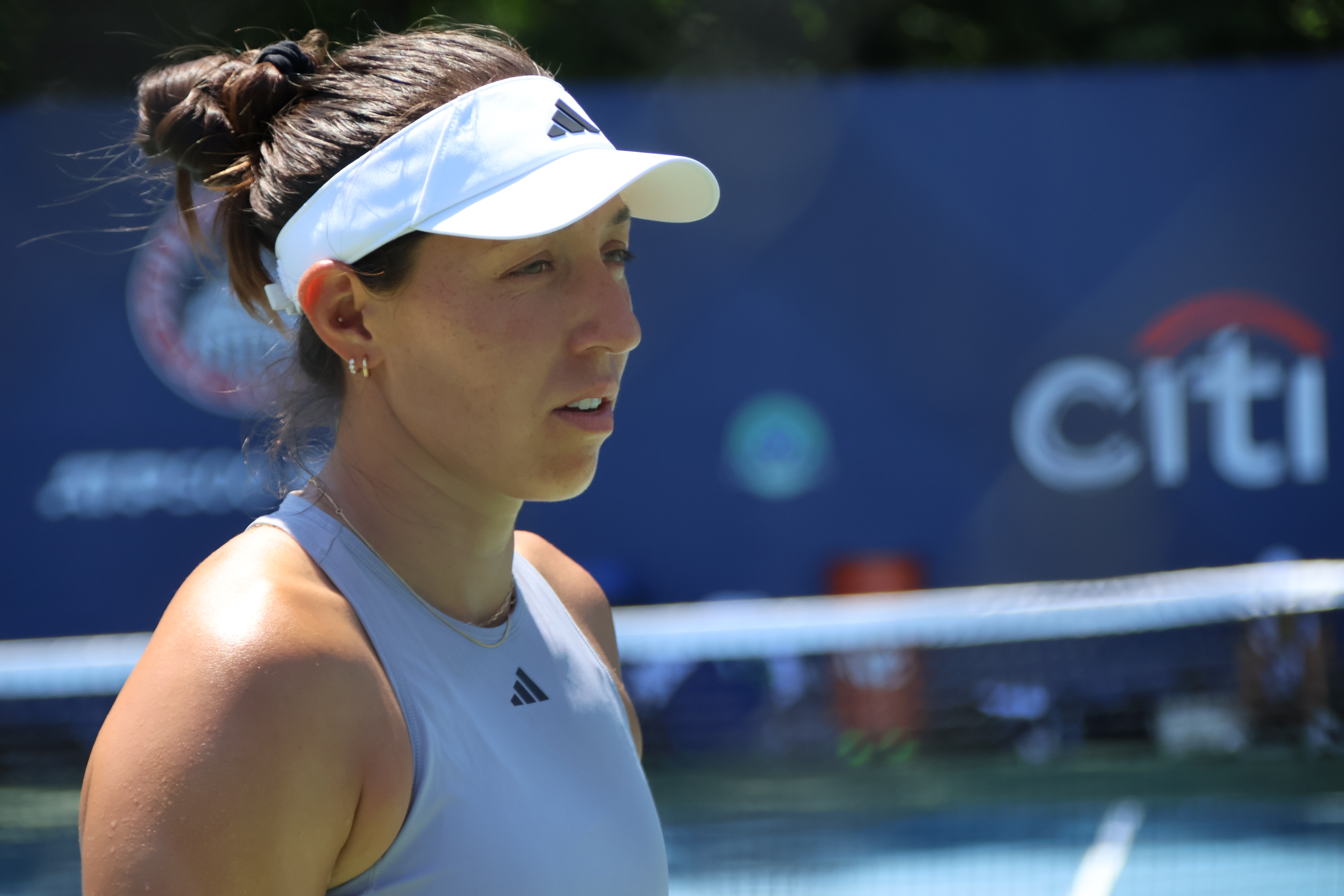
Pegula at the 2025 Washington Open

Pegula began her North American hardcourt season with an opening-round loss to eventual champion Leylah Fernandez at the Washington Open. As two-time defending champion at the Canadian Open, she lost to world No. 386, Anastasija Sevastova, in the third round. She then lost in the third round at the Cincinnati Open to Magda Linette. At the US Open, Pegula defeated Mayar Sherif, Anna Blinkova, Victoria Azarenka Ann Li and Barbora Krejčíková to make her second successive semi-final at the event. She lost in the last four to eventual champion Aryna Sabalenka.

Seeded fifth at the China Open, Pegula was given a bye in the first round and then recorded wins over Ajla Tomljanović, 30th seed Emma Raducanu 23rd seed Marta Kostyuk and 16th seed Emma Navarro to reach the semifinals, at which point her run was ended by 26th seed Linda Nosková in a match that went to a deciding set tiebreak. A bye, followed by three set wins over Hailey Baptiste, ninth seed Ekaterina Alexandrova qualifier Kateřina Siniaková and world No. 1, Aryna Sabalenka, saw Pegula reach the final at the Wuhan Open, which she lost to third seed Coco Gauff.

At the WTA Finals in November, where she was seeded fifth, Pegula defeated defending champion and third seed Coco Gauff, lost to world No. 1 Aryna Sabalenka and then overcame eighth seed Jasmine Paolini to finish second in her group and make it through to the semifinals, at which point she lost to sixth seed Elena Rybakina in three sets. Pegula finished the year ranked No. 6 in the world, her fourth consecutive top-10 ranking.

Pegula was awarded the WTA Karen Krantzcke Sportsmanship Award at the end of the year.

=== 2026: Major semifinals, WTA 1000 title ===
Pegula's 2026 season would start in Brisbane, where she lost in the semifinals to Marta Kostyuk. Pegula moved on to the Australian Open as the sixth seed, advancing to the semifinals for the first time in her career. Along the way, Pegula defeated American compatriots Madison Keys, who was the defending champion, and Amanda Anisimova before being knocked out by eventual champion Elena Rybakina in straight sets.

After Australia, Pegula would take some time off by skipping the Qatar Ladies Open, citing the quick turnaround time as the reason for her withdrawal. She would make her first appearance since Australia at the Dubai Open, where she defeated young American Iva Jovic, Amanda Anisimova again, and Elina Svitolina on her way to claim her fourth WTA 1000 title. Pegula was then scheduled to play at the ATX Open but withdrew, citing a left knee injury.

She returned at the Indian Wells Open, where she was seeded fifth. After dropping the first set, Pegula fought back to win her second round match against Donna Vekić in three sets. Pegula took on Jelena Ostapenko in the third round, where she won after dropping the first set once again. Pegula then faced Belinda Bencic in the fourth round, whom she had never beaten before, but she had no problem getting through in straight sets to advance to the quarterfinals. There, Pegula would fall in straight sets to Elena Rybakina in what was a rematch of their Australian Open semifinal.

Pegula would then move on to the Miami Open, where she was seeded fifth. Despite the rain delaying her second round match by a day, her opponent Francesca Jones would eventually retire after 38 minutes of play due to an illness, giving Pegula the win. She cruised through her next two matches against Leylah Fernandez and Jaqueline Cristian respectively to set up a quarterfinal appearance against Elena Rybakina once again. Despite taking the opening set, Pegula's Miami campaign would end with Rybakina defeating her in three sets. As of March 30, Pegula had spent 200 consecutive weeks inside the WTA top 10, with 142 of those weeks spent inside the top 5. It is the third-longest active streak among the WTA top 10 at the time of writing, only behind both Aryna Sabalenka and Iga Swiatek.

Pegula started her clay-court season in Charleston, entering as the top seed and defending champion. There she defeated Yulia Putintseva, Elisabetta Cocciaretto, Diana Shnaider, and Iva Jovic all in three sets on her way to the finals. She then defeated the unseeded Yuliia Starodubtseva in straight sets to defend her title, winning her second title of the season. Pegula then entered the Madrid Open as the fifth seed. After receiving a bye in the first round, she cruised past Katie Boulter in straight sets before falling to Marta Kostyuk in the third round, also in straight sets. At the Italian Open, Pegula reached the quarterfinals, where she lost to fourth seed Świątek in straight sets, winning just three games across the entire match. She did not carry her good form on at the French Open, losing to Kimberly Birrell in the first round having let slip a lead of a set and break of serve.

After a short French Open run, Pegula began her grass-court season as the third seed at the Berlin Open. She defeated Kateřina Siniaková in straight sets to reach the quarterfinals, where she defeated Madison Keys in two tiebreak sets. She then defeated world No. 1, Aryna Sabalenka, in three sets to advance to her second Berlin final but lost the championship match to Linda Nosková, in three sets. Her grass season ended when she lost to Coco Gauff in the Wimbledon quarterfinal.

As the top seed in the Washington DC Open, Pegula reached the finals and lost to Alexandra Eala in three sets. Her next WTA 1000 final at the Cincinnati Open saw Pegula lose in straight sets to compatriot, Coco Gauff.

Pegula entered the US Open as the third seed, competing against Aryna Sabalenka, Elena Rybakina, and Coco Gauff for an opportunity to become world No. 1 by the end of the tournament. Pegula's campaign would end in the semifinals, where she faced Sabalenka for the third year in a row, falling in straight sets.

== Rivalries ==
=== Aryna Sabalenka ===
Pegula has developed a fairly storied rivalry with Aryna Sabalenka. Their consistency on hardcourts leads to them frequently facing each other in the latter stages of events. The two have met 14 times since 2020, with Sabalenka controlling the head-to-head 10–4. Pegula would win their first meeting in the third round of the 2020 Western & Southern Open in three sets. They would face off at the 2024 US Open final in which Sabalenka would win to earn her first US Open title. The two would have a rematch of their US Open final in the 2025 US Open semifinals, where Sabalenka would win a close three-set match on her way to defending her US Open title. Pegula would snap Sabalenka's 20-match winning streak as well as her 2025 tiebreak record in their following match in Wuhan, before pulling out a three-set win. The two would meet again in the Riyadh 2025 WTA Finals, where Sabalenka defeated Pegula in three sets. They would meet once more in the Berlin Open, where Pegula beat Sabalenka in three sets. Sabalenka met Pegula at the 2026 US Open for the third year in a row, with Sabalenka defeating Pegula in a straight set semifinal.

=== Iga Świątek ===
Pegula and Iga Świątek have played each other 13 times since 2019, with Świątek leading the head-to-head 7–6. Świątek won four of their first five meetings including quarterfinal matchups at the 2022 French Open and 2022 US Open, eventually winning the title in both instances. Świątek would also win the 2023 WTA Finals by beating Pegula in the final. Pegula defeated Świątek on her way to her first Grand Slam final at the 2024 US Open, where they met in the quarterfinals once again. Their longest match came in the semifinals at the 2026 Cincinnati Open, with Pegula defeating the defending champion in three sets after nearly three hours.

=== Coco Gauff ===
Pegula and Coco Gauff have developed a notable rivalry. They consistently swap positions as the top American player in the world and frequently compete against each other in big tournaments. The two have met 11 times since 2022, with the head-to-head split 6–5 in favor of Gauff. Pegula defeated Gauff in three sets at the 2023 Canadian Open quarterfinals before going on to win her second WTA 1000 title. The two have played each other at the 2023 WTA Finals, the 2024 WTA Finals, the 2025 WTA Finals, and the 2026 WTA Finals with the wins split evenly at 2–2. Gauff went on to win in 2024 after beating Pegula in the round robin stage. They played their first Grand Slam match in the 2026 Wimbledon quarterfinals, which Gauff won in three sets. Gauff also defeated Pegula in the finals of both the 2025 Wuhan Open and the 2026 Cincinnati Open to win her third and fourth WTA 1000 titles respectfully.

=== Elena Rybakina ===
Pegula has also developed a rivalry with Elena Rybakina. Rybakina leads the head-to-hed 6–3, all their matchups being on hard courts. Pegula initially lead the rivalry winning three of the first four meetings, including winning their match at the 2023 WTA Finals. However, Rybakina has won all their matchups since then. defeating Pegula in the semifinals of both the 2025 WTA Finals, and the 2026 Australian Open enroute to winning the title.

== Coaches ==
In July 2019, Pegula hired David Witt to be her coach. Witt is a former tennis player and coach who worked with Venus Williams until they split at the end of 2018. Witt was named the 2022 WTA Coach of the Year. In February 2024, Pegula ended coaching relationship with Witt. Witt said the parting was a "total surprise" and he "never saw it coming". She hired two new coaches: Mark Knowles and Mark Merklein, who are both former players.

== Sponsorships ==
In 2021, Pegula signed an endorsement deal with Adidas. Her racquets have been provided by Yonex. In 2022, Pegula partnered with Ready Nutrition. In 2023, Pegula partnered with Stella Artois and luxury watch brand De Bethune, and became a brand ambassador for jewelry brand Gorjana.

== Personal life ==
Pegula loves dogs. She celebrated with Maddie, her mini Australian Shepherd, during the trophy ceremony at the 2019 Citi Open. In 2023, Dexter, her German Shepherd, died. In 2025, Tucker, her Labrador Retriever, died. She adopted Desiree, a German Shepherd, and Mabel, a German Shorthaired Pointer, in 2024 and 2025.

In 2016, Pegula and her sister Kelly opened a quick-serve restaurant called Healthy Scratch in LECOM Harborcenter, an ice hockey-themed mixed-use development owned by her parents in Buffalo, New York. A Healthy Scratch food truck followed, in 2017. Multiple locations opened in 2018 and 2019, but then began closing after the start of the COVID-19 pandemic in 2020. The last two locations closed in May 2022.

In 2018, Pegula founded the nonprofit organization A Lending Paw, which aims to connect rescued and trained service animals with those in need.

In 2018, Pegula introduced her own skin-care line called Ready 24.

In October 2021, Pegula married Taylor Gahagen.

In June 2022, Pegula's mother Kim Pegula suffered a cardiac attack. She moved out of the ICU after about a week and started her recovery.

In August 2025, Pegula launched “The Player’s Box” podcast, which she co-hosts alongside fellow players Madison Keys, Jennifer Brady and Desirae Krawczyk.

== Career statistics ==
=== Grand Slam performance timelines ===
Key
W	F	SF	QF	#R	RR	Q#	P#	DNQ	A	Z#	PO	G	S	B	NMS	NTI	P	NH

(W) winner; (F) finalist; (SF) semifinalist; (QF) quarterfinalist; (#R) rounds 4, 3, 2, 1; (RR) round-robin stage; (Q#) qualification round; (P#) preliminary round; (DNQ) did not qualify; (A) absent; (Z#) Davis/Fed Cup Zonal Group (with number indication) or (PO) play-off; (G) gold, (S) silver or (B) bronze Olympic/Paralympic medal; (NMS) not a Masters tournament; (NTI) not a Tier I tournament; (P) postponed; (NH) not held; (SR) strike rate (events won / competed); (W–L) win–loss record.
To avoid confusion and double counting, these charts are updated at the conclusion of a tournament or when the player's participation has ended.

==== Singles ====
Tournament	2011	2012	2013	2014	2015	2016	2017	2018	2019	2020	2021	2022	2023	2024	2025	2026	SR	W–L	Win %
Australian Open	A	A	Q1	A	A	Q2	A	A	A	1R	QF	QF	QF	2R	3R	SF	0 / 7	20–7	74%
French Open	A	A	Q2	A	Q3	Q1	A	A	1R	1R	3R	QF	3R	A	4R	1R	0 / 7	11–7	61%
Wimbledon	A	A	Q1	A	Q3	Q2	A	A	1R	NH	2R	3R	QF	2R	1R	QF	0 / 7	12–7	63%
US Open	Q2	Q2	A	A	2R	1R	Q1	Q3	1R	3R	3R	QF	4R	F	SF	SF	0 / 10	28–10	74%
Win–Loss	0–0	0–0	0–0	0–0	1–1	0–1	0–0	0–0	0–3	2–3	9–4	14–4	13–4	8–3	10–4	14–4	0 / 31	71–31	70%

==== Doubles ====
Tournament	2011	2012	...	2015	2016	...	2019	2020	2021	2022	2023	2024	2025	2026	SR	W–L	Win %
Australian Open	A	A		A	A		A	2R	1R	2R	SF	A	A	1R	0 / 5	6–5	55%
French Open	A	A		A	A		3R	QF	2R	F	SF	A	A	A	0 / 5	15–5	75%
Wimbledon	A	A		A	A		1R	NH	3R	A	3R	QF	A	A	0 / 4	7–4	64%
US Open	3R	2R		1R	1R		1R	2R	1R	1R	QF	A	A	A	0 / 9	7–9	44%
Win–Loss	2–1	1–1		0–1	0–1		2–3	5–3	3–4	6–3	13–4	3–1	0–0	0–1	0 / 23	35–23	60%

== Grand Slam tournament finals ==
=== Women's singles: 1 (runner-up) ===
Result	Year	Tournament	Surface	Opponent	Score
Loss	2024	US Open	Hard	Aryna Sabalenka	5–7, 5–7

=== Women's doubles: 1 (runner-up) ===
Result	Year	Tournament	Surface	Partner	Opponents	Score
Loss	2022	French Open	Clay	(United States) Coco Gauff	(France) Caroline Garcia (France) Kristina Mladenovic	6–2, 3–6, 2–6

=== Mixed doubles: 1 (runner-up) ===
Result	Year	Tournament	Surface	Partner	Opponents	Score
Loss	2023	US Open	Hard	(United States) Austin Krajicek	(Kazakhstan) Anna Danilina (Finland) Harri Heliövaara	3–6, 4–6

== Other significant finals ==
=== Year-end championships ===
==== Singles: 1 (runner-up) ====
Result	Year	Tournament	Surface	Opponent	Score
Loss	2023	WTA Finals, Mexico	Hard	(Poland) Iga Świątek	1–6, 0–6

== World TeamTennis ==
Pegula made her World TeamTennis debut in 2020 joining the Orlando Storm at the start of the season, which was played at The Greenbrier.

Pegula emerged as one of the top players in the WTT 2020 season. After the dismissal of Danielle Collins, Pegula went on to play women's singles, women's doubles with Darija Jurak, and mixed doubles with Ken Skupski and Tennys Sandgren. She posted a strong 9–2 record in singles to help the Storm earn a No. 3 seed in the WTT Playoffs. The Storm would ultimately fall to the Chicago Smash in the semifinals.
