= 2023 WTA Finals – Singles =

Singles
- 2023 WTA Finals

Final
- Champion: (Poland) Iga Świątek
- Runner-up: (United States) Jessica Pegula
- Score: 6–1, 6–0

Details
- Draw: 8 (round robin + elimination)
- Seeds: 8

Events
Singles	Doubles
- WTA Finals

Iga Świątek defeated Jessica Pegula in the final, 6–1, 6–0 to win the singles tennis title at the 2023 WTA Finals. She did not lose a set during the tournament, the first player to do so since Serena Williams in 2012. Świątek dropped just 20 games throughout the entire tournament, the fewest since the reintroduction of the round-robin format in 2003. By winning the title, Świątek regained the world No. 1 ranking from Aryna Sabalenka.

Caroline Garcia was the reigning champion, but did not qualify this year. No previous champions qualified for this year's tournament, guaranteeing a first-time WTA Finals champion.

Elena Rybakina and Markéta Vondroušová made their singles debuts at the event; they were both eliminated in the round-robin stage. Karolína Muchová also would have made her debut, but withdrew due to an ongoing wrist injury; she was replaced by Maria Sakkari. Muchová would eventually make her debut at the 2026 tournament.

Pegula was the first player to face the world No. 1, No. 2, No. 3, and No. 4 at a single event since the WTA rankings began in 1975.

== Seeds ==
1. Aryna Sabalenka (semifinals)
2. (Poland) Iga Świątek (champion)
3. (United States) Coco Gauff (semifinals)
4. (Kazakhstan) Elena Rybakina (round robin)
5. (United States) Jessica Pegula (final)
6. (Tunisia) Ons Jabeur (round robin)
7. (Czech Republic) Markéta Vondroušová (round robin)
8. (Greece) Maria Sakkari (round robin)

== Alternates ==
1. (Czech Republic) Barbora Krejčíková (did not play)

== Draw ==
Key

- Q = Qualifier
- WC = Wild card
- LL = Lucky loser
- Alt = Alternate
- ITF = ITF entry
- PR = Protected ranking
- SR = Special ranking
- SE = Special exempt
- JE = Junior exempt
- JR = Junior Accelerator Programme entrant
- CO = College Accelerator Programme entrant
- NG = Next Gen Accelerator Program entrant
- w/o = Walkover
- r = Retired
- d = Defaulted

=== Finals ===
Semifinals
5	(United States) Jessica Pegula	6	6
3	(United States) Coco Gauff	2	1
2	(Poland) Iga Świątek	6	6
1	Aryna Sabalenka	3	2

Final
5	(United States) Jessica Pegula	1	0
2	(Poland) Iga Świątek	6	6

=== Bacalar Group ===
		Sabalenka	(Kazakhstan) Rybakina	(United States) Pegula	(Greece) Sakkari	RR; W–L	Set; W–L	Game; W–L	Standings
1	Aryna Sabalenka		6–2, 3–6, 6–3	4–6, 3–6	6–0, 6–1	2–1	4–3 (57%)	34–24 (59%)	2
4	(Kazakhstan) Elena Rybakina	2–6, 6–3, 3–6		5–7, 2–6	6–0, 6–7^{(4–7)}, 7–6^{(7–2)}	1–2	3–5 (38%)	37–41 (47%)	3
5	(United States) Jessica Pegula	6–4, 6–3	7–5, 6–2		6–3, 6–2	3–0	6–0 (100%)	37–19 (66%)	1
8	(Greece) Maria Sakkari	0–6, 1–6	0–6, 7–6^{(7–4)}, 6–7^{(2–7)}	3–6, 2–6		0–3	1–6 (14%)	19–43 (31%)	4

=== Chetumal Group ===
		(Poland) Świątek	(United States) Gauff	(Tunisia) Jabeur	(Czech Republic) Vondroušová	RR; W–L	Set; W–L	Game; W–L	Standings
2	(Poland) Iga Świątek		6–0, 7–5	6–1, 6–2	7–6^{(7–3)}, 6–0	3–0	6–0 (100%)	38–14 (73%)	1
3	(United States) Coco Gauff	0–6, 5–7		6–0, 6–1	5–7, 7–6^{(7–4)}, 6–3	2–1	4–3 (57%)	35–30 (54%)	2
6	(Tunisia) Ons Jabeur	1–6, 2–6	0–6, 1–6		6–4, 6–3	1–2	2–4 (33%)	16–31 (34%)	3
7	(Czech Republic) Markéta Vondroušová	6–7^{(3–7)}, 0–6	7–5, 6–7^{(4–7)}, 3–6	4–6, 3–6		0–3	1–6 (14%)	29–43 (40%)	4
