= Laura Siegemund =

German tennis player (born 1988)

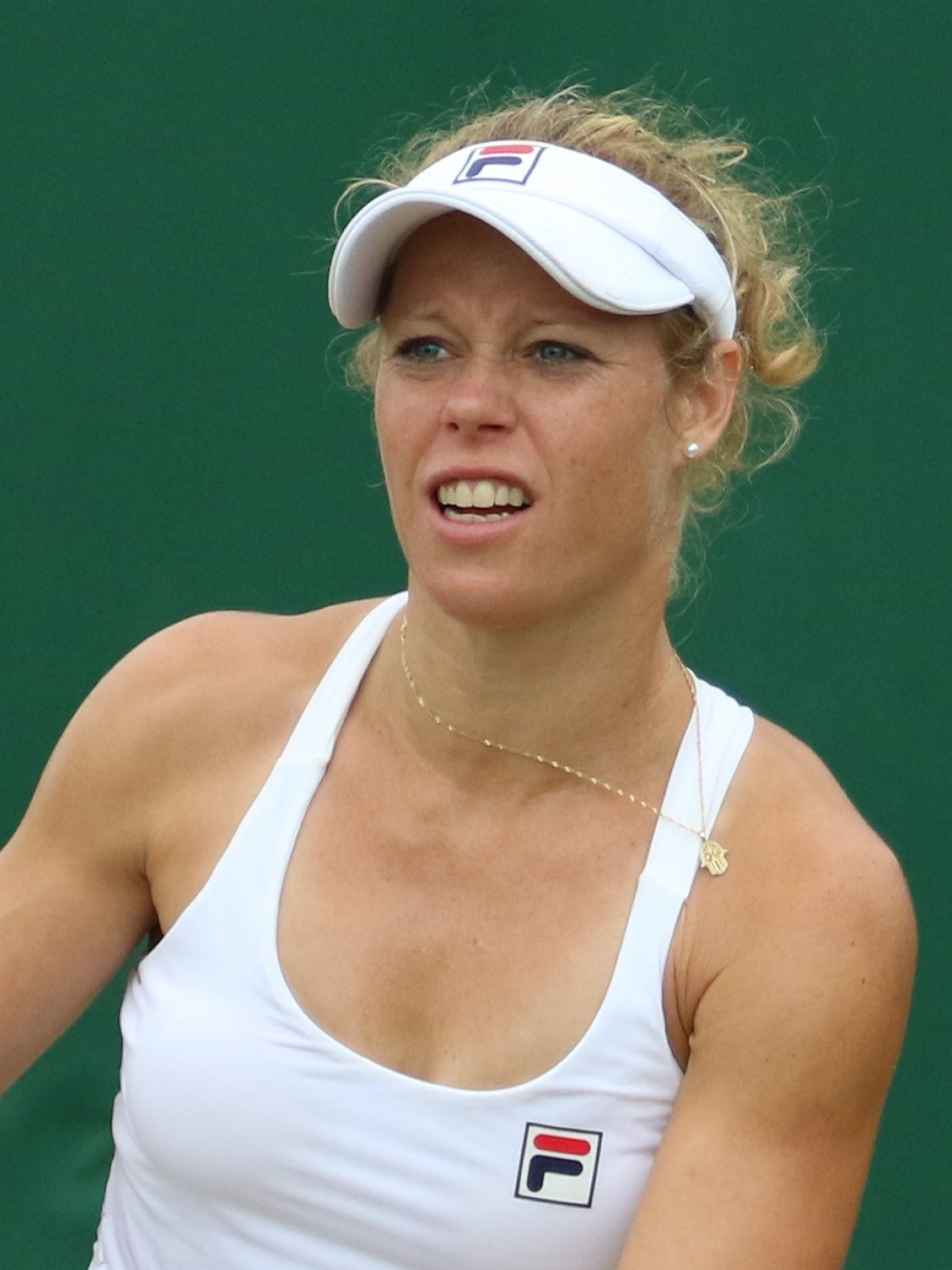
- Siegemund at the 2023 Wimbledon Championships
- Full name: Laura Natalie Siegemund
- Country (sports): Germany
- Residence: Stuttgart, Germany
- Born: 4 March 1988 (age 38) Filderstadt, West Germany
- Height: 1.68 m (5 ft 6 in)
- Turned pro: 2006
- Plays: Right-handed (two-handed backhand)
- Coach: Antonio Zucca
- Prize money: $8,905,278

Singles
- Career record: 615–425
- Career titles: 2
- Highest ranking: No. 27 (29 August 2016)
- Current ranking: No. 194 (19 October 2026)

Grand Slam singles results
- Australian Open: 3R (2016, 2023, 2025)
- French Open: QF (2020)
- Wimbledon: QF (2025)
- US Open: 3R (2016, 2025)

Other tournaments
- Olympic Games: QF (2016)

Doubles
- Career record: 388–221
- Career titles: 16
- Highest ranking: No. 4 (29 January 2024)
- Current ranking: No. 27 (19 October 2026)

Grand Slam doubles results
- Australian Open: QF (2024)
- French Open: QF (2026)
- Wimbledon: QF (2023, 2024)
- US Open: W (2020)

Other doubles tournaments
- Tour Finals: W (2023)
- Olympic Games: 1R (2016, 2021, 2024)

Mixed doubles
- Career record: 27–18
- Career titles: 2

Grand Slam mixed doubles results
- Australian Open: QF (2024)
- French Open: W (2024)
- Wimbledon: QF (2019, 2026)
- US Open: W (2016)

Other mixed doubles tournaments
- Olympic Games: QF (2021)

Team competitions
- BJK Cup: 1R (2017, 2019, 2024), RR (2023)
- Last updated on: 19 October 2026.

Laura Natalie Siegemund (born 4 March 1988) is a German inactive professional tennis player. She reached her career-high doubles ranking of world No. 4 on 29 January 2024 and has won fifteen doubles titles on the WTA Tour.

Siegemund is a three-time Grand Slam champion, having won the 2020 US Open in women's doubles with Vera Zvonareva, as well as the 2016 US Open and the 2024 French Open in mixed doubles, partnering Mate Pavić and Édouard Roger-Vasselin, respectively. Alongside her major titles, she won the 2023 WTA Finals and the 2022 Miami Open in doubles.

In singles, her career-high ranking is world No. 27, achieved in August 2016, and she has won two WTA titles, at the 2016 Swedish Open and 2017 Stuttgart Open. Siegemund's best Grand Slam result in singles was a quarterfinal appearance at the 2020 French Open and at 2025 Wimbledon. She also reached the same stage at the 2016 Summer Olympics, and has represented Germany in the Billie Jean King Cup since 2017.

== Biography ==
Siegemund was born to parents Harro (an engineer) and Brigitta Siegemund, and has two siblings. She was introduced to tennis by her family at age three. Siegemund lived in Riyadh, Saudi Arabia from age four to seven and in Jakarta, Indonesia from nine to ten. In 2016, she completed her bachelor's degree in psychology from the University of Hagen. Besides German, she is fluent in English and French. Her tennis idol growing up was Steffi Graf.

== Career ==
=== 2000: Juniors ===
Siegemund won the Junior Orange Bowl in the "12 and under" age category as the first German since Steffi Graf in 1981.

=== 2002–14: ITF Circuit & WTA Tour debut ===
In 2002, Siegemund played her first events on the ITF Circuit. The following year, she contested her first WTA qualifying in Leipzig, Germany. In 2004, she continued playing on ITF tournaments, and won her first ITF doubles title in 2005 in Darmstadt, Germany, and her first ITF singles title in 2006 in Lagos, Nigeria; and in that year also three other ITF doubles titles, but fell in WTA singles qualifying twice. In 2007, she won one ITF doubles title, but fell in WTA singles qualifying once. She won three ITF doubles titles in 2008 and two ITF doubles titles in 2009, but fell in WTA singles qualifying at the US Open. In 2010, she played her first WTA Tour main draw at the Swedish Open, falling in the first round as a qualifier. She also won four doubles titles on the ITF Circuit, but fell in WTA tournament singles qualifying once.

She won one ITF singles title in 2011, but fell in tour singles qualifying nine times (incl. Roland Garros, Wimbledon, US Open). In 2012, she won three singles titles and one doubles title on the ITF Circuit. In 2013, she won three singles titles and two doubles titles on ITF Circuit, but fell in WTA Tour singles qualifying once (again US Open). In 2014, she won her first main-draw match on the WTA Tour at the Swedish Open in Båstad, defeating Yaroslava Shvedova in the first round. She won two singles titles and two doubles titles on ITF Circuit, but fell in the first round once and in WTA singles qualifying four times (incl. Roland Garros, Wimbledon, US Open).

=== 2015: First major, top 100 debut ===
She reached the quarterfinals at the WTA Tour twice in Florianópolis, Brazil and in Kockelscheuer, Luxembourg. She reached the second round once; fell in the first round four times (incl. Wimbledon and US Open) and in qualifying five times (incl. the other two majors).

She won three career doubles titles and also won one singles and one doubles title on ITF Circuit.

In Wimbledon, she reached her first Grand Slam main draw after exiting ten times in the qualification rounds.

Siegemund reached the top 100 in the WTA rankings on 14 September finishing the season at No. 90 on 9 November 2015.

=== 2016: WTA Tour title, US Open mixed title ===
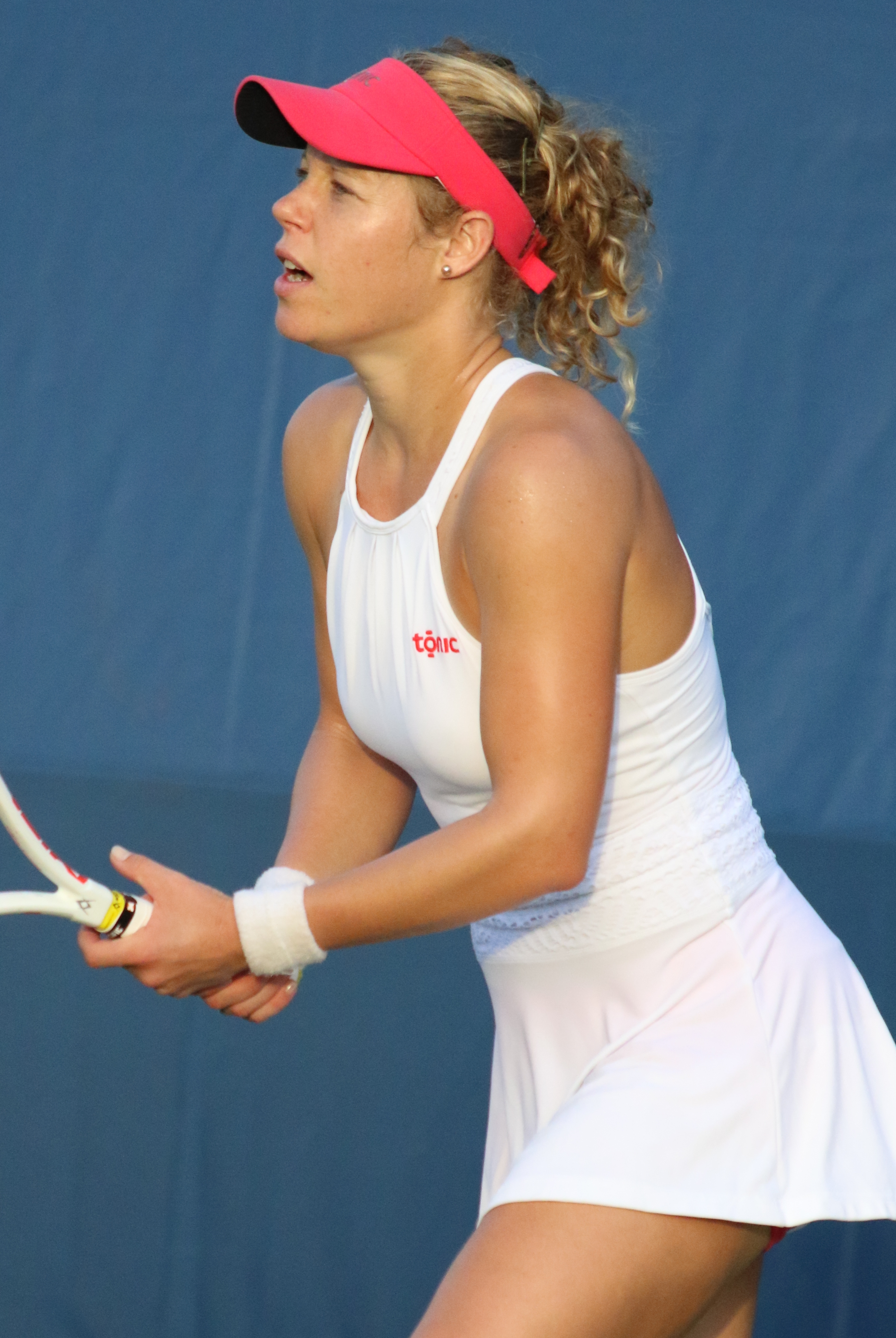
Siegemund at the 2016 US Open

At the Australian Open, Siegemund scored one of her biggest victories, defeating former world No. 1 Jelena Janković in the second round in three sets.

In April, she made an upset by reaching the final as a qualifier in Stuttgart, losing to compatriot and defending champion Angelique Kerber. On her way to this success she beat three top-10 players in a row (Simona Halep, Roberta Vinci and Agnieszka Radwańska), all of them in straight sets.

At the Premier Mandatory Madrid Open, she reached as a qualifier the third round. After beating ninth-seed Svetlana Kuznetsova and Mirjana Lučić-Baroni, she lost to Sorana Cîrstea.

At the French Open and in Wimbledon, she was knocked out in the first round.

In July, she won the first WTA title of her career in Båstad, the place where she played her first match on the WTA Tour in 2010. In the final, she defeated Kateřina Siniaková in straight sets.

She got to the quarterfinals at the Olympic Games in Rio de Janeiro.

In September, she won her first Grand Slam title, winning the US Open mixed-doubles championship with Mate Pavić.

=== 2017: First Premier title, injury ===
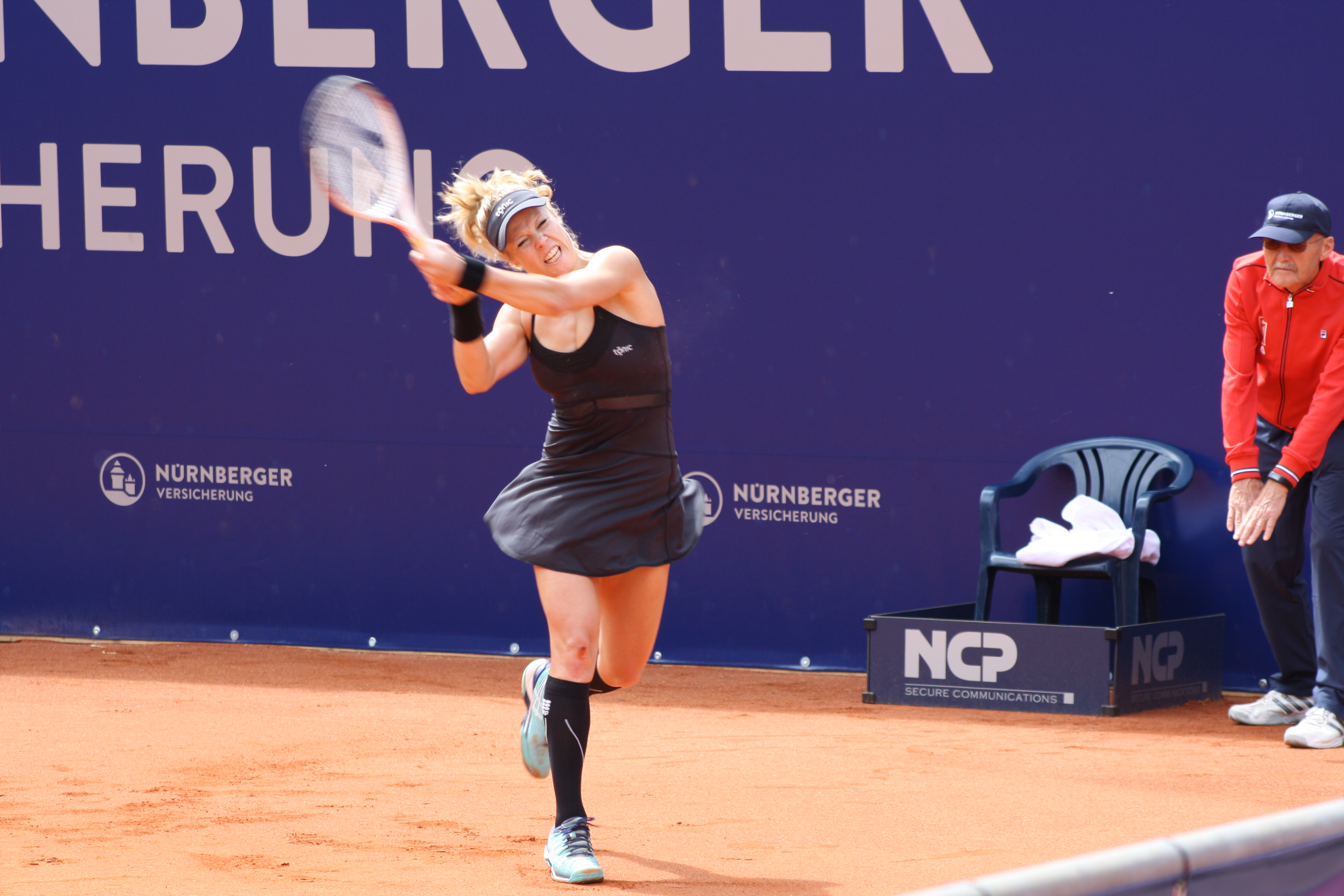
Siegemund at the 2017 Nuremberg Cup

After winning only one of nine matches on hardcourt, Siegemund started the clay-court season by reaching the semifinals of the Charleston Open.

She won her second career title in her hometown Premier event Stuttgart Open after a wildcard entry, defeating Kristina Mladenovic in the final, in three sets.

In May at the Nuremberg Cup, she suffered a knee injury which kept her out for the rest of the season.

=== 2018: Return to the WTA Tour ===
Siegemund made her return to the WTA Tour in April at the Charleston Open where she lost in the second round to tenth seed Naomi Osaka. At the Ladies Open Lugano, she retired during her first-round match against Kathinka von Deichmann. Siegemund received a wildcard to compete at the Porsche Tennis Grand Prix as the defending champion. In the first round, she beat Barbora Strýcová but was defeated in round two by eventual finalist CoCo Vandeweghe.

=== 2019: Wimbledon mixed doubles quarterfinal ===
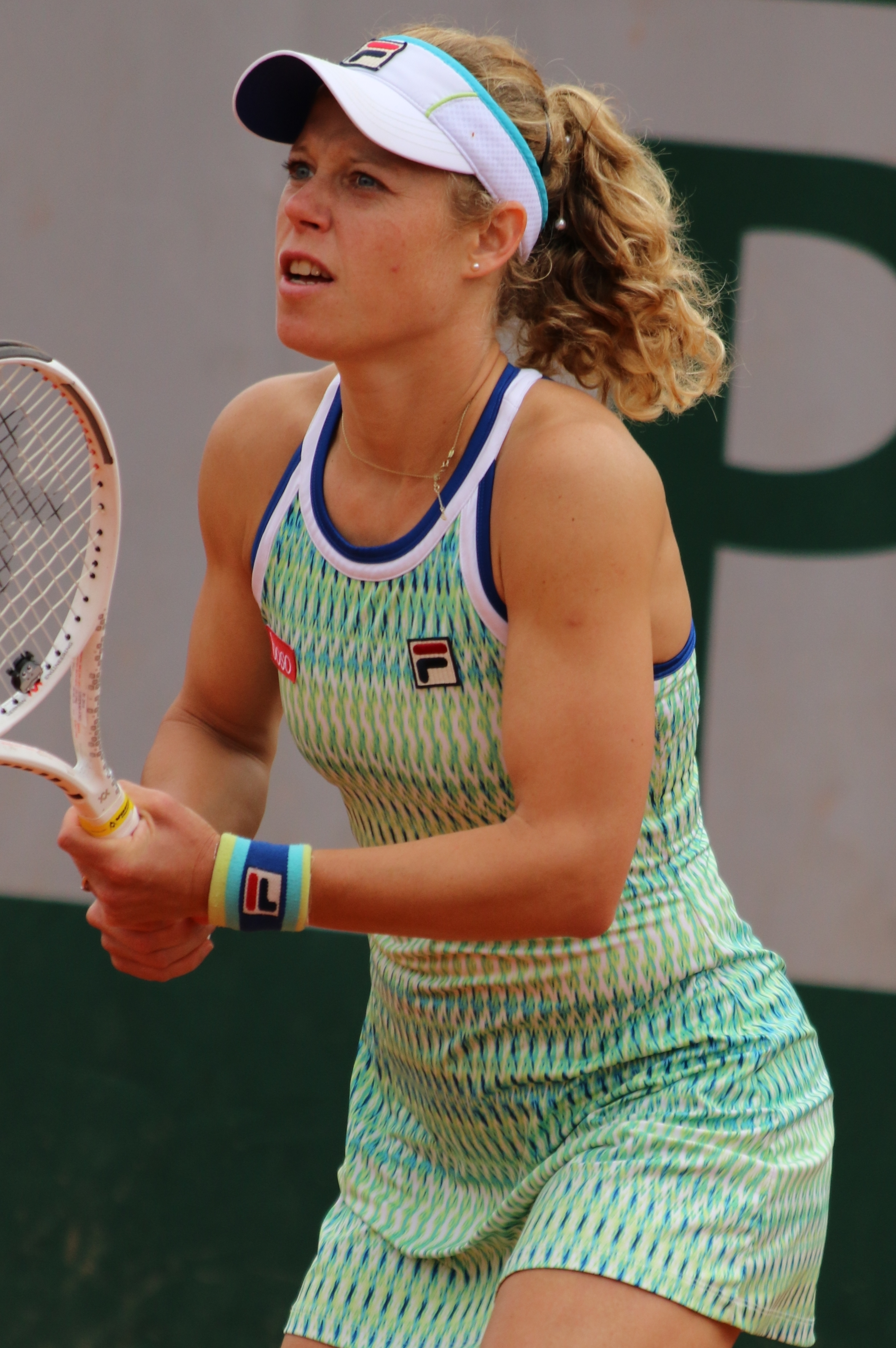
Siegemund at the 2019 French Open

Siegemund started her 2019 season at the Auckland Open. She lost in the final round of qualifying to Bianca Andreescu who would end up reaching the final. However, she earned a lucky loser spot into the main draw. She was defeated in the first round by top seed and two-time finalist, Caroline Wozniacki. Getting past qualifying at the Hobart International, she was eliminated in the first round by Dayana Yastremska. At the Australian Open, she beat two-time champion and former world No. 1, Victoria Azarenka, in the first round. She was beaten in the second round by 28th seed Hsieh Su-wei.

=== 2020: US Open doubles title ===
Siegemund started the 2020 season at the Auckland Open. She reached the quarterfinals where she lost to top seed and eventual champion, Serena Williams. At the Australian Open, she was defeated in the second round by second seed Karolína Plíšková.

Playing for Germany in the Fed Cup tie against Brazil, Siegemund won both of her rubbers beating Teliana Pereira and Gabriela Cé. Those wins helped Germany win the tie 4–0 to advance to the Fed Cup Finals. Coming through qualifying at the Qatar Open, she made it to the second round where she lost to top seed Ashleigh Barty. Seeded fifth at the Indian Wells Challenger, she reached the quarterfinals and lost to Vera Zvonareva. The WTA Tour was suspended from the week of 9 March through July due to the coronavirus pandemic.

Siegemund returned to action in August at the Palermo Ladies Open where she was eliminated in the second round by fourth seed and eventual finalist, Anett Kontaveit. Competing at the Prague Open, she was beaten in the second round by Sara Sorribes Tormo. Playing one tournament before the US Open, the Cincinnati Open, Siegemund got through qualifying and reached the second round defeating world No. 18 and tenth seed Marketa Vondrousova before losing to fellow qualifier and doubles partner Vera Zvonareva. At the US Open, Siegemund lost in the first round to 16th seed Elise Mertens. However, in doubles, she and Zvonareva won the title beating Nicole Melichar/Xu Yifan in the final.

Siegemund had a great run at the French Open. She reached her first Grand Slam quarterfinal in singles where she lost to seventh seed Petra Kvitová.

Siegemund ended the year ranked 50 in singles and 41 in doubles.

=== 2021: Top 30 in doubles, Olympics ===
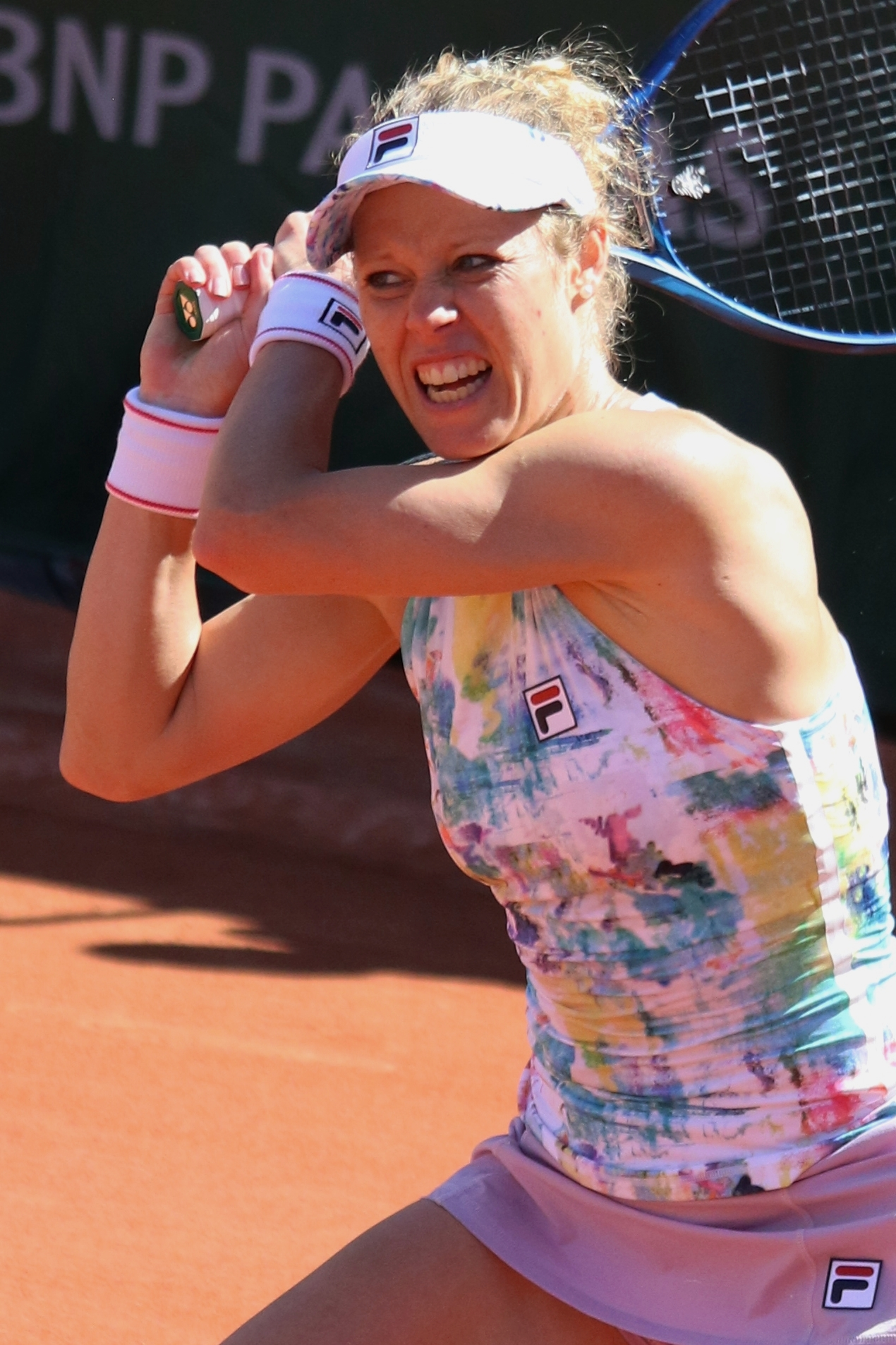
Siegemund at the 2021 French Open

Siegemund began season at the first edition of the Abu Dhabi Open where she lost in the first round to Kirsten Flipkens. Seeded 16th at the first edition of the Gippsland Trophy, she reached the third round where she was defeated by top seed Simona Halep. At the Australian Open, Siegemund was eliminated from the tournament in the first round by tenth seed and seven-time champion, Serena Williams. After the Australian Open, she competed at the Adelaide International. She was beaten in the first round by seventh seed Yulia Putintseva.

Getting past qualifying at the Qatar Ladies Open, Siegemund made it to the second round where she lost to eighth seed and two-time champion, Victoria Azarenka. In Dubai, she was defeated in the first round by Anastasia Potapova. At Miami, she withdrew from her second-round match against 14th seed and three-time champion, Victoria Azarenka, due to a right knee injury.

Starting her clay-court season at the Stuttgart Open, Siegemund was eliminated in the second round by top seed and eventual champion, Ashleigh Barty. Getting past qualifying in Madrid, she was beaten in her second-round match by 14th seed Iga Świątek. At the Italian Open, she fell in the final round of qualifying to Ajla Tomljanović. However, due to Venus Williams withdrawing from the event, she entered the main draw as a lucky loser. She lost in the first round to Nadia Podoroska, in three sets. Last year quarterfinalist at the French Open, she wasn't able to match that result this year; she lost in the first round to Caroline Garcia.

Seeded eighth at the first edition of the Bad Homburg Open, Siegemund's first grass-court tournament of the season, she reached the quarterfinals in which she was defeated by eventual finalist Kateřina Siniaková. At Wimbledon, she was eliminated in the first round by 32nd seed Ekaterina Alexandrova.

Representing Germany at the Summer Olympics, Siegemund fell in the first round to fourth seed and eventual bronze medalist, Elina Svitolina.

Siegemund then withdrew from the US Open due to a knee injury.

=== 2022: Doubles: Miami title and world No. 27 ===
Siegemund won the doubles at the Lyon Open title with Vera Zvonareva. She won her first WTA 1000 doubles title at the Miami Open, again with partner Vera Zvonareva. Partnering with Kirsten Flipkens, she won the doubles title at the Transylvania Open. At the end of the season, she reached a new career-high doubles ranking of world No. 27 on 17 October 2022.

=== 2023: Doubles: WTA Finals title and top 5 ===
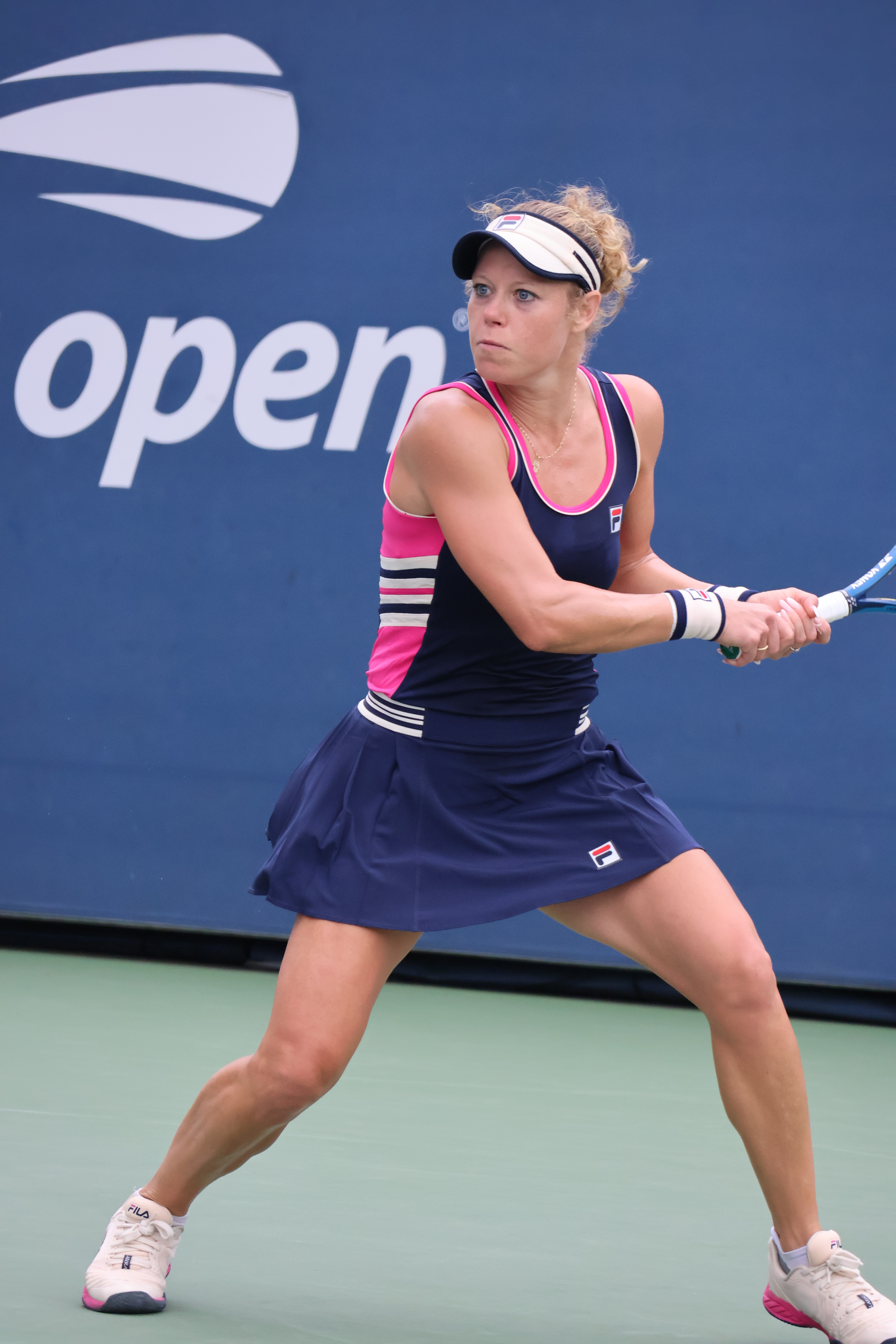
Siegemund at the 2023 US Open

At the United Cup she lost both her singles matches against Petra Kvitová and Jessica Pegula. One week later, she won her tenth title on the WTA Tour at the Hobart International alongside Kirsten Flipkens, which whom she also won the Transylvania Open in October 2022.

She entered the singles competition of the Australian Open using protected ranking. After winning her second-round match against Irina-Camelia Begu, Siegemund lost to Caroline Garcia in a three set match lasting over two hours.

Playing with Beatriz Haddad Maia, she reached her second WTA 1000 final at the Indian Wells Open, losing to top seeds Barbora Krejčíková and Kateřina Siniaková.

In July, she reached her first WTA Tour singles final in over six years at the Poland Open, but lost to world No. 1, Iga Świątek.

At the US Open, she reached her second doubles final at this tournament with Vera Zvonareva. She won her second doubles title of the season at the Ningbo Open with Vera Zvonareva.

In singles, ranked No. 113, she qualified for the main draw of the WTA 500 Zhengzhou Open and won over Lin Zhu. She then recorded her first top-20 win over 11th seed Liudmila Samsonova since Cincinnati 2020 where she beat tenth seed Marketa Vondrousova. As a result, she returned to the top 100 in the singles rankings.

Following her Jiangxi Open doubles title, she reached the top 10 for the first time in her career and also qualified with Vera Zvonareva for the WTA Finals in Cancun. It was her first qualification in doubles for the year-end prestigious event. Next the pair Siegemund/Zvonareva reached the final, a first time at this level for both players. They won the title by defeating Nicole Melichar-Martinez and Ellen Perez. As a result, she reached the top 5 in doubles on 6 November 2023.

=== 2024: French Open mixed title, world No. 4 ===
At the beginning of the year, Siegemund won with Team Germany the United Cup. She won all three of her mixed doubles matches with partner Alexander Zverev, all of which were tie-deciding in the knockout stage. In the final, they beat the Polish team of Iga Świątek and Hubert Hurkacz in a match tie-break to claim the title.

At the Adelaide International, she defeated seventh seed Liudmila Samsonova, her first top 20 win of the season and Ana Bogdan to reach the quarterfinals and returned to the top 80 in the singles rankings on 15 January 2024. In doubles she reached the semifinals with new partner Barbora Krejcikova.

In singles, at the Australian Open, she defeated 17th seed Ekaterina Alexandrova, for her second top 20 win of the season. She lost to Storm Hunter in three sets. In doubles with Barbora Krejcikova, she reached the quarterfinals but lost also to Storm Hunter and her new partner Katerina Siniakova. Despite this, she moved to a new career-high of world No. 4 in the doubles rankings.

Siegemund and Krejcikova were runners-up at the Madrid Open in May, losing 0–6, 2–6 to Cristina Bucsa and Sara Sorribes Tormo in the final of the clay-court WTA 1000 event. At the French Open, she won her third Grand Slam title by winning the mixed doubles with Édouard Roger-Vasselin.

Her second-round match at the Thailand Open against fifth seed Wang Xiyu lasted 4 hours and 9 minutes, making it the first match to break the four hour mark since the 2011 Australian Open fourth round match between Francesca Schiavone and Svetlana Kuznetsova, and the fourth-longest on the WTA Tour in the Open Era. Next, she defeated Rebeka Masarova and qualifier Arianne Hartono in straight sets to reach the final which she lost in straight sets to Rebecca Šramková She won her 15th doubles title at the 2024 Japan Women's Open in Osaka partnering Ena Shibahara. Siegemund and Shibahara were runners-up at the Pan Pacific Open, losing to Shuko Aoyama and Eri Hozumi in the final.

=== 2025: Wimbledon singles quarterfinal and back to top 100 ===
Partnering with Beatriz Haddad Maia, Siegemund was runner-up in the doubles at the Adelaide International, losing to Guo Hanyu and Alexandra Panova in the final. She reached the singles third round at the Australian Open with wins over Hailey Baptiste and fifth seed Zheng Qinwen, before losing to 27th seed Anastasia Pavlyuchenkova.

At Wimbledon, Siegemund upset the reigning Australian Open champion and world No. 6, Madison Keys, to reach the fourth round for the first time at this major. Siegemund is the sixth player in the Open Era to reach the Women's singles fourth round at the SW19 after having turned 37 after Billie Jean King, Virginia Wade, Martina Navratilova, Venus and Serena Williams. In the quarterfinals, she lost to world No. 1 Aryna Sabalenka in three sets.

At the US Open, Siegemund upset 20th seed Diana Shnaider in the first round, before losing to 11th seed Ekaterina Alexandrova in the third.

=== 2026 ===
At the Australian Open, Siegemund came back from 0–6, 2–5 down and saved match points to upset 18th seed Liudmila Samsonova in the first round.

== Career statistics ==
=== Performance timelines ===
Key
W	F	SF	QF	#R	RR	Q#	DNQ	A	NH

(W) winner; (F) finalist; (SF) semifinalist; (QF) quarterfinalist; (#R) rounds 4, 3, 2, 1; (RR) round-robin stage; (Q#) qualification round; (DNQ) did not qualify; (A) absent; (NH) not held; (SR) strike rate (events won / competed); (W–L) win–loss record.
To avoid confusion and double counting, these charts are updated at the conclusion of a tournament or when the player's participation has ended.

==== Singles ====
Tournament	2009	2010	2011	2012	2013	2014	2015	2016	2017	2018	2019	2020	2021	2022	2023	2024	2025	2026	SR	W–L	Win %
Grand Slam tournaments
Australian Open	A	A	A	A	A	A	Q3	3R	1R	A	2R	2R	1R	A	3R	2R	3R	2R	0 / 9	10–9	53%
French Open	A	A	Q2	A	A	Q3	Q2	1R	A	1R	2R	QF	1R	Q3	A	1R	1R	1R	0 / 8	5–8	38%
Wimbledon	A	A	Q1	A	A	Q2	1R	1R	A	A	2R	NH	1R	A	Q3	2R	QF	1R	0 / 7	6–7	46%
US Open	Q1	A	Q1	A	Q2	Q3	1R	3R	A	1R	2R	1R	A	1R	1R	1R	3R	A	0 / 9	5–9	36%
Win–loss	0–0	0–0	0–0	0–0	0–0	0–0	0–2	4–4	0–1	0–2	4–4	5–3	0–3	0–1	2–2	2–4	8–4	1–3	0 / 33	26–33	44%
Career statistics
Titles	0	0	0	0	0	0	0	1	1	0	0	0	0	0	0	0	0	0	Career total: 2		
Finals	0	0	0	0	0	0	0	2	1	0	0	0	0	0	1	1	0	0	Career total: 5		
Year-end ranking	227	225	243	383	235	161	90	31	69	117	73	50	124	169	86	84	46	195			

==== Doubles ====
Tournament	2015	2016	2017	2018	2019	2020	2021	2022	2023	2024	2025	2026	SR	W–L	Win %
Grand Slam tournaments
Australian Open	A	1R	2R	A	1R	1R	3R	A	1R	QF	3R	3R	0 / 9	10–9	53%
French Open	A	3R	A	A	3R	2R	3R	1R	1R	3R	3R	QF	0 / 9	12–9	57%
Wimbledon	Q1	1R	A	A	3R	NH	3R	A	QF	QF	3R	3R	0 / 7	13–6	68%
US Open	2R	1R	A	3R	3R	W	A	A	F	3R	2R	A	1 / 8	18–7	72%
Win–loss	1–1	2–4	1–1	2–1	6–4	6–2	6–3	0–1	7–4	10–4	7–3	5–3	1 / 33	53–31	63%
Year-end championship
WTA Finals	did not qualify					NH	DNQ		W	did not qualify			1 / 1	4–1	80%
Career statistics
Titles	3	0	0	1	1	1	0	3	5	1	1	0	Career total: 16		
Finals	4	1	0	2	1	1	0	4	7	3	2	2	Career total: 27		
Year-end ranking	44	86	128	80	82	41	58	27	5	21	24	29			

==== Mixed doubles ====
Tournament	2016	2017	2018	2019	2020	2021	2022	2023	2024	2025	2026	SR	W–L	Win %
Grand Slam tournaments
Australian Open	A	1R	A	A	A	1R	A	A	QF	A	2R	0 / 4	3–4	43%
French Open	A	A	A	A	NH	1R	1R	A	W	QF	SF	1 / 5	10–4	71%
Wimbledon	2R	A	A	QF	NH	A	A	1R	1R	A	QF	0 / 5	6–5	55%
US Open	W	A	1R	1R	NH	A	1R	1R	A	A	A	1 / 5	5–4	56%
Win–loss	6–1	0–1	0–1	3–2	0–0	0–2	0–2	0–2	7–2	2–1	6–3	2 / 19	24–17	59%

=== Grand Slam tournament finals ===
==== Women's doubles: 2 (1 title, 1 runner-up) ====
Result	Year	Tournament	Surface	Partner	Opponents	Score
Win	2020	US Open	Hard	(Russia) Vera Zvonareva	(United States) Nicole Melichar (China) Xu Yifan	6–4, 6–4
Loss	2023	US Open	Hard	Vera Zvonareva	(Canada) Gabriela Dabrowski (New Zealand) Erin Routliffe	6–7^{(9–11)}, 3–6

==== Mixed doubles: 2 (2 titles) ====
Result	Year	Tournament	Surface	Partner	Opponents	Score
Win	2016	US Open	Hard	(Croatia) Mate Pavić	(United States) CoCo Vandeweghe (United States) Rajeev Ram	6–4, 6–4
Win	2024	French Open	Clay	(France) Édouard Roger-Vasselin	(United States) Desirae Krawczyk (United Kingdom) Neal Skupski	6–4, 7–5

=== Year-end championships finals ===
==== Doubles: 1 (title) ====
Result	Year	Tournament	Surface	Partner	Opponents	Score
Win	2023	WTA Finals, Cancún	Hard	Vera Zvonareva	(United States) Nicole Melichar-Martinez (Australia) Ellen Perez	6–4, 6–4

== Published works ==
=== Books ===
- Siegemund; Laura; and Brunner, Prof. Dr. Stefan. Wild Card: Mastering the Mental Game in Tennis, in Sport, and in Life. Meyer & Meyer Sport, 2023. ISBN 1782552707, 978–1782552703. 267 pages.
