= 2023 WTA Finals – Doubles =

Doubles
- 2023 WTA Finals

Final
- Champions: (Germany) Laura Siegemund; Vera Zvonareva
- Runners-up: (United States) Nicole Melichar-Martinez (Australia) Ellen Perez
- Score: 6–4, 6–4

Details
- Draw: 8 (round robin)

Events
Singles	Doubles
← 2022 ·	WTA Finals	· 2024 →

Laura Siegemund and Vera Zvonareva defeated Nicole Melichar-Martinez and Ellen Perez in the final, 6–4, 6–4 to win the doubles tennis title at the 2023 WTA Finals. Siegemund became the first German WTA Finals doubles champion.

Veronika Kudermetova and Elise Mertens were the reigning champions, but Kudermetova did not qualify this year. Mertens partnered Storm Hunter, but lost in the semifinals to Siegemund and Zvonareva.

Hunter attained the year-end WTA No. 1 doubles ranking after Coco Gauff and Jessica Pegula were eliminated in the round robin competition. Gabriela Dabrowski, Kateřina Siniaková, Siegemund, and Shuko Aoyama were also in contention for the top ranking at the beginning of the tournament.

Hunter, Perez, Erin Routliffe and Siegemund all made their debuts in the doubles competition at the WTA Finals.

== Seeds ==
1. (United States) Coco Gauff / (United States) Jessica Pegula (round robin)
2. (Australia) Storm Hunter / (Belgium) Elise Mertens (semifinals)
3. (Japan) Shuko Aoyama / (Japan) Ena Shibahara (round robin)
4. (Czech Republic) Barbora Krejčíková / (Czech Republic) Kateřina Siniaková (round robin)
5. (United States) Desirae Krawczyk / (Netherlands) Demi Schuurs (round robin)
6. (Germany) Laura Siegemund / Vera Zvonareva (champions)
7. (Canada) Gabriela Dabrowski / (New Zealand) Erin Routliffe (semifinals)
8. (United States) Nicole Melichar-Martinez / (Australia) Ellen Perez (final)

== Alternates ==
1. (Czech Republic) Miriam Kolodziejová / (Czech Republic) Markéta Vondroušová (did not play)

== Draw ==
=== Key ===
- Q = Qualifier
- WC = Wild card
- LL = Lucky loser
- Alt = Alternate
- SE = Special exempt
- PR = Protected ranking
- ITF = ITF entry
- JE = Junior exempt
- w/o = Walkover
- r = Retired
- d = Defaulted
- SR = Special ranking

=== Finals ===
Semifinals
7	(Canada) Gabriela Dabrowski (New Zealand) Erin Routliffe	1	7^{7}	[6]
8	(United States) Nicole Melichar-Martinez (Australia) Ellen Perez	6	6^{1}	[10]
6	(Germany) Laura Siegemund; Vera Zvonareva	3	6	[10]
2	(Australia) Storm Hunter (Belgium) Elise Mertens	6	3	[5]

Final
8	(United States) Nicole Melichar-Martinez (Australia) Ellen Perez	4	4
6	(Germany) Laura Siegemund; Vera Zvonareva	6	6

=== Mahahual Group ===
		(United States) Gauff (United States) Pegula	(Czech Republic) Krejčíková (Czech Republic) Siniaková	(Germany) Siegemund; Zvonareva	(Canada) Dabrowski (New Zealand) Routliffe	RR; W–L	Set; W–L	Game; W–L	Standings
1	(United States) Coco Gauff (United States) Jessica Pegula		6–3, 5–7, [6–10]	6–3, 4–6, [8–10]	6–7^{(2–7)}, 3–6	0–3	2–6 (25%)	30–34 (47%)	4
4	(Czech Republic) Barbora Krejčíková (Czech Republic) Kateřina Siniaková	3–6, 7–5, [10–6]		3–6, 7–6^{(8–6)}, [5–10]	4–6, 5–7	1–2	3–5 (38%)	30–37 (45%)	3
6	(Germany) Laura Siegemund; Vera Zvonareva	3–6, 6–4, [10–8]	6–3, 6–7^{(6–8)}, [10–5]		4–6, 2–6	2–1	4–4 (50%)	29–32 (48%)	2
7	(Canada) Gabriela Dabrowski (New Zealand) Erin Routliffe	7–6^{(7–2)}, 6–3	6–4, 7–5	6–4, 6–2		3–0	6–0 (100%)	38–24 (61%)	1

=== Maya Ka'an Group ===
		(Australia) Hunter (Belgium) Mertens	(Japan) Aoyama (Japan) Shibahara	(United States) Krawczyk (Netherlands) Schuurs	(United States) Melichar-Martinez (Australia) Perez	RR; W–L	Set; W–L	Game; W–L	Standings
2	(Australia) Storm Hunter (Belgium) Elise Mertens		6–4, 6–2	6–2, 6–3	7–5, 6–4	3–0	6–0 (100%)	37–20 (65%)	1
3	(Japan) Shuko Aoyama (Japan) Ena Shibahara	4–6, 2–6		7–5, 6–2	6–4, 2–6, [6–10]	1–2	3–4 (43%)	27–30 (47%)	3
5	(United States) Desirae Krawczyk (Netherlands) Demi Schuurs	2–6, 3–6	5–7, 2–6		2–6, 5–7	0–3	0–6 (0%)	19–38 (33%)	4
8	(United States) Nicole Melichar-Martinez (Australia) Ellen Perez	5–7, 4–6	4–6, 6–2, [10–6]	6–2, 7–5		2–1	4–3 (57%)	33–28 (54%)	2

Standings are determined by: 1. number of wins; 2. number of matches; 3. in two-team ties, head-to-head records; 4. in three-team ties, (a) percentage of sets won (head-to-head records if two teams remain tied), then (b) percentage of games won (head-to-head records if two teams remain tied), then (c) WTA rankings.
