= Hanigovce =

Village and municipality in Slovakia

- Municipality
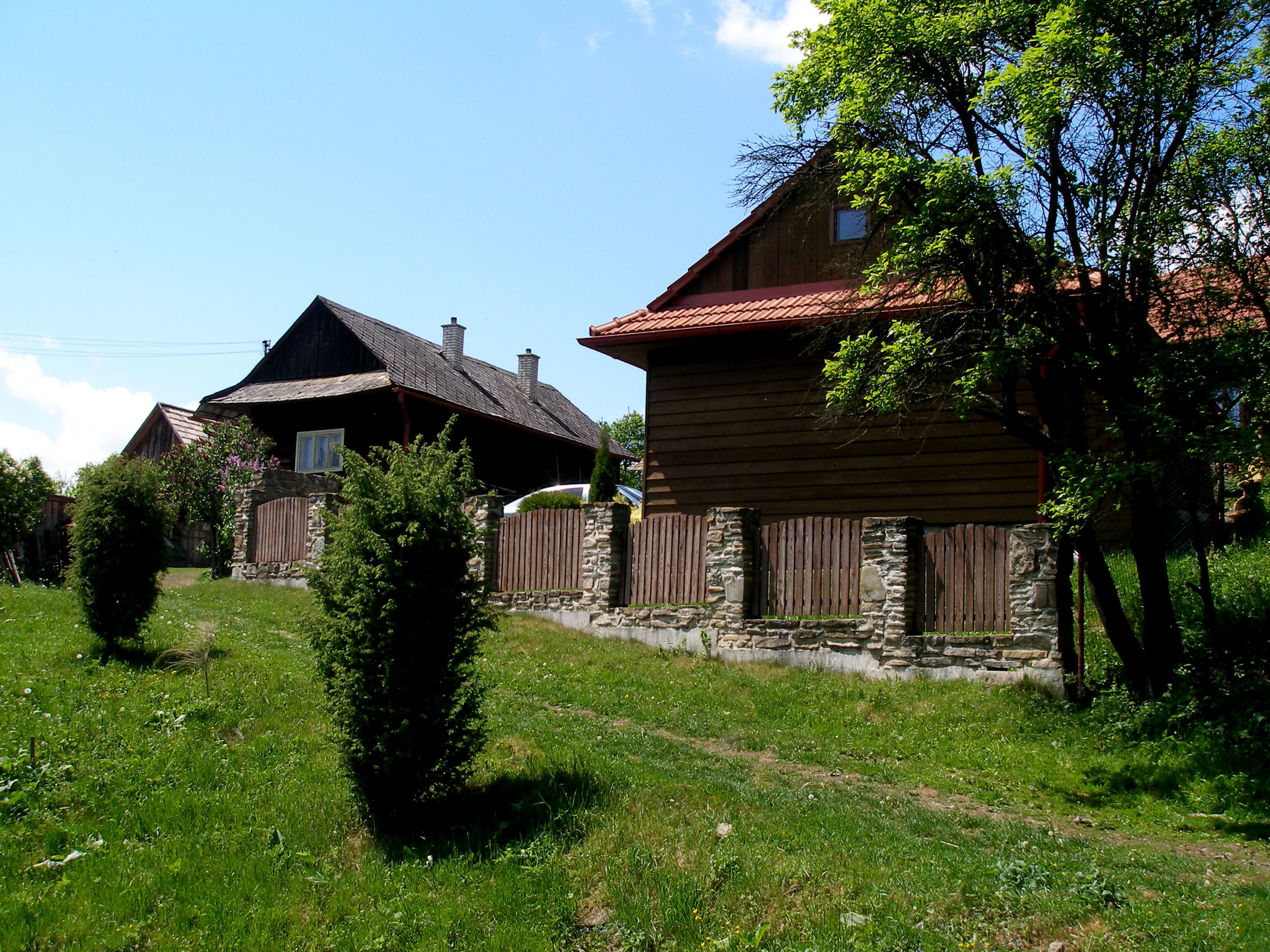

- Flag

- Location of Hanigovce in the Prešov Region Location of Hanigovce in Slovakia
- Coordinates: 49.18°N 21.02°E
- Country: Slovakia
- Region: Prešov Region
- District: Sabinov District
- First mentioned: 1330

Area
  - Total: 8.47 km^{2} (3.27 sq mi)
- Elevation: 521 m (1,709 ft)

Population (2025)
  - Total: 126
- Time zone: UTC+1 (CET)
  - Summer (DST): UTC+2 (CEST)
- Postal code: 825 7
- Area code: +421 51
- Vehicle registration plate (until 2022): SB
- Website: hanigovce.sk

Hanigovce (German: Hönigsdorf; Hungarian: Hőnig) is a village and municipality in Sabinov District in the Prešov Region of north-eastern Slovakia.

== History ==
In historical records the village was first mentioned in 1330.

== Geography ==
The municipality lies at an altitude of 521 metres (1,709 ft) and covers an area of 8.47 km^{2} (3.27 sq mi) (2025).

== Population ==
Population statistic (10 years)
| Year | 1995 | 2005 | 2015 | 2025 |
|---|---|---|---|---|
| Count | 167 | 124 | 129 | 126 |
| Difference | | −25.74% | +4.03% | −2.32% |

Population statistic
| Year | 2024 | 2025 |
|---|---|---|
| Count | 126 | 126 |
| Difference | | +0% |

It has a population of 126 people (31 December 2025).

=== Ethnicity ===
Census 2021 (1+ %)
| Ethnicity | Number | Fraction |
|---|---|---|
| Slovak | 124 | 98.41% |
| Rusyn | 11 | 8.73% |
| Not found out | 2 | 1.58% |
| Total | 126 | |

In year 2021 was 126 people by ethnicity 124 as Slovak, 11 as Rusyn, 2 as Not found out, 1 as Czech and 1 as Canadian.

Note on population: The difference values of population numbers in the table "Population statistic" and in the sections "Ethnicity" & "Religion" is caused by the use of various statistical methods.

=== Religion ===
Census 2021 (1+ %)
| Religion | Number | Fraction |
|---|---|---|
| Greek Catholic Church | 83 | 65.87% |
| None | 18 | 14.29% |
| Roman Catholic Church | 16 | 12.7% |
| Eastern Orthodox Church | 7 | 5.56% |
| Not found out | 2 | 1.59% |
| Total | 126 | |

In year 2021 was 126 people by religion 83 from Greek Catholic Church, 18 from None, 16 from Roman Catholic Church, 7 from Eastern Orthodox Church and 2 from Not found out.

== Genealogical resources ==
The records for genealogical research are available at the state archive "Statny Archiv in Presov, Slovakia"

- Roman Catholic church records (births/marriages/deaths): 1699-1896 (parish B)
- Greek Catholic church records (births/marriages/deaths): 1786-1895 (parish B)

== See also ==
- List of municipalities and towns in Slovakia
