= De Bethune =

Swiss watch manufacturer

De Bethune is an independent, luxury Swiss watch manufacture d'horlogerie founded in 2002 by watchmaker Denis Flageollet and watch industry veteran David Zanetta. Zanetta sold his majority share of the brand in 2017 after years of poor financial performance; De Bethune currently has four shareholders. Operating out of its workshops in L'Auberson, Switzerland, the brand blends centuries-old classical watchmaking traditions with futuristic aesthetics and mechanical innovation.

The manufacture produces a few hundred timepieces each year, and has developed over 30 proprietary calibers, filed numerous patents, and earned the Grand Prix d’Horlogerie de Genève “Aiguille d'Or” Grand Prix for the best watch of the year.

De Bethune has collaborated with Louis Vuitton.

== See also ==
- MB&F
- F. P. Journe
