= 2021 ITF Women's World Tennis Tour (January–March) =

The 2021 ITF Women's World Tennis Tour is the 2021 edition of the second-tier tour for women's professional tennis. It is organised by the International Tennis Federation and is a tier below the WTA Tour. The ITF Women's World Tennis Tour includes tournaments with prize money ranging from $15,000 up to $100,000.

== Key ==
Category
W100 tournaments
W80 tournaments
W60 tournaments
W25 tournaments
W15 tournaments

== Month ==
=== January ===
Week of	Tournament	Winner	Runners-up	Semifinalists	Quarterfinalists
January 4	Cairo, Egypt; Clay; W15; Singles and Doubles Draws	(Spain) Jéssica Bouzas Maneiro; 2–6, 7–5, 6–3	(Slovakia) Chantal Škamlová	(Sweden) Fanny Östlund (Hungary) Vanda Lukács	(South Africa) Chanel Simmonds (Netherlands) Lexie Stevens (Slovakia) Barbora Matúšová (Egypt) Sandra Samir
January 4	Cairo, Egypt; Clay; W15; Singles and Doubles Draws	(United States) Anastasia Nefedova (Netherlands) Lexie Stevens; 6–1, 6–4	(Sweden) Fanny Östlund (Egypt) Sandra Samir	(Sweden) Fanny Östlund (Hungary) Vanda Lukács	(South Africa) Chanel Simmonds (Netherlands) Lexie Stevens (Slovakia) Barbora Matúšová (Egypt) Sandra Samir
January 4	Monastir, Tunisia; Hard; W15; Singles and Doubles Draws	(France) Salma Djoubri; 6–4, 3–6, 6–2	(India) Zeel Desai	(Russia) Darya Astakhova (United States) Gabriella Price	(Belgium) Tilwith Di Girolami (Belgium) Eliessa Vanlangendonck (France) Manon Arcangioli (France) Karen Marthiens
January 4	Monastir, Tunisia; Hard; W15; Singles and Doubles Draws	(Russia) Darya Astakhova (Algeria) Inès Ibbou; 6–3, 6–0	(France) Manon Arcangioli (France) Salma Djoubri	(Russia) Darya Astakhova (United States) Gabriella Price	(Belgium) Tilwith Di Girolami (Belgium) Eliessa Vanlangendonck (France) Manon Arcangioli (France) Karen Marthiens
January 4	Antalya, Turkey; Clay; W15; Singles and Doubles Draws	(Serbia) Tamara Čurović; 7–5, 7–6^{(7–4)}	(Italy) Aurora Zantedeschi	(Georgia (country)) Sofia Shapatava (Switzerland) Svenja Ochsner	(Switzerland) Jenny Dürst (Italy) Federica Arcidiacono (Romania) Andreea Prisăcariu (Turkey) İpek Öz
January 4	Antalya, Turkey; Clay; W15; Singles and Doubles Draws	(Turkey) Cemre Anıl (Turkey) İpek Öz; 6–2, 3–6, [10–6]	(Italy) Federica Arcidiacono (Italy) Aurora Zantedeschi	(Georgia (country)) Sofia Shapatava (Switzerland) Svenja Ochsner	(Switzerland) Jenny Dürst (Italy) Federica Arcidiacono (Romania) Andreea Prisăcariu (Turkey) İpek Öz
January 11	Hamburg, Germany; Hard (indoor); W25; Singles and Doubles Draws	(China) Zheng Qinwen; 6–2, 6–3	(Czech Republic) Linda Fruhvirtová	(Czech Republic) Jesika Malečková (Germany) Noma Noha Akugue	(Hungary) Anna Bondár (France) Amandine Hesse (Spain) Marina Bassols Ribera (Romania) Ioana Loredana Roșca
January 11	Hamburg, Germany; Hard (indoor); W25; Singles and Doubles Draws	(Hungary) Anna Bondár (Slovakia) Tereza Mihalíková; 6–4, 6–4	(France) Amandine Hesse (Belgium) Kimberley Zimmermann	(Czech Republic) Jesika Malečková (Germany) Noma Noha Akugue	(Hungary) Anna Bondár (France) Amandine Hesse (Spain) Marina Bassols Ribera (Romania) Ioana Loredana Roșca
January 11	Cairo, Egypt; Clay; W15; Singles and Doubles Draws	(Spain) Jéssica Bouzas Maneiro; 6–0, 6–0	(United States) Anastasia Nefedova	(Japan) Yuriko Lily Miyazaki (Egypt) Sandra Samir	(South Africa) Chanel Simmonds (Netherlands) Lexie Stevens (Austria) Sinja Kraus (Russia) Anna Morgina
January 11	Cairo, Egypt; Clay; W15; Singles and Doubles Draws	(Russia) Elina Avanesyan (Netherlands) Lexie Stevens; 6–1, 6–2	(Italy) Gloria Ceschi (Italy) Marion Viertler	(Japan) Yuriko Lily Miyazaki (Egypt) Sandra Samir	(South Africa) Chanel Simmonds (Netherlands) Lexie Stevens (Austria) Sinja Kraus (Russia) Anna Morgina
January 11	Monastir, Tunisia; Hard; W15; Singles and Doubles Draws	Tournament cancelled after the first round due to the lockdown measures applied in Tunisia caused by the coronavirus pandemic.			
January 11	Antalya, Turkey; Clay; W15; Singles and Doubles Draws	(Turkey) Berfu Cengiz; 3–6, 6–2, 6–4	(Turkey) İpek Öz	(Russia) Valeriya Olyanovskaya (Slovenia) Pia Lovrič	(Germany) Julia Kimmelmann (Lithuania) Justina Mikulskytė (Switzerland) Jenny Dürst (Romania) Andreea Prisăcariu
January 11	Antalya, Turkey; Clay; W15; Singles and Doubles Draws	(Slovenia) Pia Lovrič (Hungary) Adrienn Nagy; 6–4, 7–5	(Turkey) Ayla Aksu (Bulgaria) Ani Vangelova	(Russia) Valeriya Olyanovskaya (Slovenia) Pia Lovrič	(Germany) Julia Kimmelmann (Lithuania) Justina Mikulskytė (Switzerland) Jenny Dürst (Romania) Andreea Prisăcariu
January 18	Fujairah City, United Arab Emirates; Hard; W25; Singles and Doubles Draws	(Denmark) Clara Tauson; 6–0, 4–6, 6–3	(Switzerland) Viktorija Golubic	(Ukraine) Daria Snigur (Japan) Kurumi Nara	(Turkey) Çağla Büyükakçay (Spain) Cristina Bucșa (Spain) Eva Guerrero Álvarez (Poland) Maja Chwalińska
January 18	Fujairah City, United Arab Emirates; Hard; W25; Singles and Doubles Draws	(Turkey) Çağla Büyükakçay (Switzerland) Viktorija Golubic; 5–7, 6–4, [10–4]	(Chinese Taipei) Liang En-shuo (China) You Xiaodi	(Ukraine) Daria Snigur (Japan) Kurumi Nara	(Turkey) Çağla Büyükakçay (Spain) Cristina Bucșa (Spain) Eva Guerrero Álvarez (Poland) Maja Chwalińska
January 18	Cairo, Egypt; Clay; W15; Singles and Doubles Draws	(Austria) Sinja Kraus; 6–2, 6–3	(Russia) Elina Avanesyan	(Slovakia) Chantal Škamlová (Bosnia and Herzegovina) Dea Herdželaš	(Egypt) Sandra Samir (Slovenia) Živa Falkner (Russia) Anna Morgina (Netherlands) Lexie Stevens
January 18	Cairo, Egypt; Clay; W15; Singles and Doubles Draws	(Russia) Elina Avanesyan (Netherlands) Lexie Stevens; 6–1, 6–2	(United States) Emma Davis (United States) Anastasia Nefedova	(Slovakia) Chantal Škamlová (Bosnia and Herzegovina) Dea Herdželaš	(Egypt) Sandra Samir (Slovenia) Živa Falkner (Russia) Anna Morgina (Netherlands) Lexie Stevens
January 18	Manacor, Spain; Hard; W15; Singles and Doubles Draws	(Philippines) Alex Eala; 5–7, 6–1, 6–2	(Spain) Yvonne Cavallé Reimers	(Hong Kong) Adithya Karunaratne (France) Léolia Jeanjean	(France) Carole Monnet (Colombia) Emiliana Arango (France) Sara Cakarevic (Switzerland) Simona Waltert
January 18	Manacor, Spain; Hard; W15; Singles and Doubles Draws	(Spain) Ángela Fita Boluda (Russia) Oksana Selekhmeteva; 6–1, 4–6, [10–5]	(Switzerland) Ylena In-Albon (Switzerland) Valentina Ryser	(Hong Kong) Adithya Karunaratne (France) Léolia Jeanjean	(France) Carole Monnet (Colombia) Emiliana Arango (France) Sara Cakarevic (Switzerland) Simona Waltert
January 18	Antalya, Turkey; Clay; W15; Singles and Doubles Draws	(Greece) Sapfo Sakellaridi vs. (Russia) Julia Avdeeva; The final was abandoned due to poor weather with Sakellaridi leading 3–1. Both players split ranking points and prize money.		(Czech Republic) Aneta Laboutková (Romania) Cristina Dinu	(Italy) Nuria Brancaccio (Turkey) Zeynep Sönmez (Russia) Erika Andreeva (Russia) Ekaterina Makarova
January 18	Antalya, Turkey; Clay; W15; Singles and Doubles Draws	(Argentina) Victoria Bosio (Brazil) Gabriela Cé; 6–4, 6–3	(Japan) Miyu Kato (Japan) Haine Ogata	(Czech Republic) Aneta Laboutková (Romania) Cristina Dinu	(Italy) Nuria Brancaccio (Turkey) Zeynep Sönmez (Russia) Erika Andreeva (Russia) Ekaterina Makarova
January 25	Open Andrézieux-Bouthéon 42; Andrézieux-Bouthéon, France; Hard (indoor); W60; Singles Draw – Doubles Draw	(France) Harmony Tan; 3–6, 6–2, 6–1	(Romania) Jaqueline Cristian	(Poland) Urszula Radwańska (Liechtenstein) Kathinka von Deichmann	(Switzerland) Leonie Küng (Romania) Laura Ioana Paar (Ukraine) Katarina Zavatska (Germany) Anna-Lena Friedsam
January 25	Open Andrézieux-Bouthéon 42; Andrézieux-Bouthéon, France; Hard (indoor); W60; Singles Draw – Doubles Draw	(China) Lu Jiajing (China) You Xiaodi; 6–3, 6–4	(Poland) Paula Kania-Choduń (Ukraine) Katarina Zavatska	(Poland) Urszula Radwańska (Liechtenstein) Kathinka von Deichmann	(Switzerland) Leonie Küng (Romania) Laura Ioana Paar (Ukraine) Katarina Zavatska (Germany) Anna-Lena Friedsam
January 25	Georgia's Rome Tennis Open; Rome, United States; Hard; W60; Singles Draw – Doubles Draw	(Spain) Irene Burillo Escorihuela; 1–6, 7–6^{(7–4)}, 6–1	(United States) Grace Min	(United States) Emina Bektas (Mexico) Ana Sofía Sánchez	(Canada) Katherine Sebov (United States) Usue Maitane Arconada (United States) Robin Montgomery (Switzerland) Conny Perrin
January 25	Georgia's Rome Tennis Open; Rome, United States; Hard; W60; Singles Draw – Doubles Draw	(United States) Emina Bektas (United Kingdom) Tara Moore; 5–7, 6–2, [10–8]	(Belarus) Olga Govortsova (Serbia) Jovana Jović	(United States) Emina Bektas (Mexico) Ana Sofía Sánchez	(Canada) Katherine Sebov (United States) Usue Maitane Arconada (United States) Robin Montgomery (Switzerland) Conny Perrin
January 25	Cairo, Egypt; Clay; W15; Singles and Doubles Draws	(Slovakia) Chantal Škamlová; 6–4, 5–7, 6–4	(United States) Anastasia Nefedova	(Slovenia) Pia Lovrič (Bosnia and Herzegovina) Dea Herdželaš	(Russia) Anastasia Zolotareva (Bosnia and Herzegovina) Anita Husarić (Russia) Anastasia Sukhotina (France) Julie Belgraver
January 25	Cairo, Egypt; Clay; W15; Singles and Doubles Draws	(Netherlands) Quirine Lemoine (Netherlands) Gabriella Mujan; 4–6, 6–3, [10–6]	(Bosnia and Herzegovina) Dea Herdželaš (Bosnia and Herzegovina) Anita Husarić	(Slovenia) Pia Lovrič (Bosnia and Herzegovina) Dea Herdželaš	(Russia) Anastasia Zolotareva (Bosnia and Herzegovina) Anita Husarić (Russia) Anastasia Sukhotina (France) Julie Belgraver
January 25	Manacor, Spain; Hard; W15; Singles and Doubles Draws	(Switzerland) Simona Waltert; 6–2, 7–6^{(7–4)}	(Spain) Yvonne Cavallé Reimers	(Japan) Shiho Akita (Switzerland) Ylena In-Albon	(Spain) María Gutiérrez Carrasco (France) Alice Robbe (Colombia) Emiliana Arango (Philippines) Alex Eala
January 25	Manacor, Spain; Hard; W15; Singles and Doubles Draws	(Switzerland) Ylena In-Albon (Italy) Camilla Rosatello; 7–6^{(7–3)}, 6–7^{(9–11)}, [10–5]	(Spain) Ángela Fita Boluda (Russia) Oksana Selekhmeteva	(Japan) Shiho Akita (Switzerland) Ylena In-Albon	(Spain) María Gutiérrez Carrasco (France) Alice Robbe (Colombia) Emiliana Arango (Philippines) Alex Eala
January 25	Antalya, Turkey; Clay; W15; Singles and Doubles Draws	Singles and doubles competitions were abandoned due to poor weather		(Brazil) Ingrid Gamarra Martins (Brazil) Carolina Alves (Russia) Julia Avdeeva (Italy) Nuria Brancaccio	(United States) Jessie Aney (Italy) Matilde Paoletti (Lithuania) Justina Mikulskytė (Greece) Sapfo Sakellaridi

=== February ===
Week of	Tournament	Winner	Runners-up	Semifinalists	Quarterfinalists
February 1	Sharm El Sheikh, Egypt; Hard; W15; Singles and Doubles Draws	(Belgium) Magali Kempen; 6–3, 6–2	(Belgium) Sofia Costoulas	(Lithuania) Justina Mikulskytė (Italy) Lucia Bronzetti	(Japan) Kyōka Okamura (Czech Republic) Anna Sisková (Belarus) Shalimar Talbi (United States) Emma Davis
February 1	Sharm El Sheikh, Egypt; Hard; W15; Singles and Doubles Draws	(Chinese Taipei) Liang En-shuo (Japan) Kyōka Okamura; 1–6, 6–4, [10–3]	(Belgium) Magali Kempen (Belarus) Shalimar Talbi	(Lithuania) Justina Mikulskytė (Italy) Lucia Bronzetti	(Japan) Kyōka Okamura (Czech Republic) Anna Sisková (Belarus) Shalimar Talbi (United States) Emma Davis
February 1	Shymkent, Kazakhstan; Hard (indoor); W15; Singles and Doubles Draws	(Belarus) Yuliya Hatouka; 7–5, 6–2	(Russia) Anastasia Tikhonova	(Russia) Ekaterina Kazionova (Russia) Anna Ukolova	(Uzbekistan) Sabina Sharipova (Czech Republic) Nikola Břečková (Russia) Daria Mishina (Kazakhstan) Zhibek Kulambayeva
February 1	Shymkent, Kazakhstan; Hard (indoor); W15; Singles and Doubles Draws	(Poland) Weronika Baszak (Russia) Anastasia Tikhonova; 6–2, 3–6, [10–6]	(Russia) Daria Mishina (Russia) Noel Saidenova	(Russia) Ekaterina Kazionova (Russia) Anna Ukolova	(Uzbekistan) Sabina Sharipova (Czech Republic) Nikola Břečková (Russia) Daria Mishina (Kazakhstan) Zhibek Kulambayeva
February 1	Manacor, Spain; Hard; W15; Singles and Doubles Draws	(Russia) Oksana Selekhmeteva; 6–3, 6–2	(Netherlands) Suzan Lamens	(Spain) Yvonne Cavallé Reimers (Spain) María Gutiérrez Carrasco	(Philippines) Alex Eala (Switzerland) Tess Sugnaux (Switzerland) Ylena In-Albon (Japan) Shiho Akita
February 1	Manacor, Spain; Hard; W15; Singles and Doubles Draws	(Portugal) Francisca Jorge (Netherlands) Stéphanie Visscher; 6–7^{(4–7)}, 6–3, [10–2]	(Italy) Camilla Rosatello (Russia) Ekaterina Yashina	(Spain) Yvonne Cavallé Reimers (Spain) María Gutiérrez Carrasco	(Philippines) Alex Eala (Switzerland) Tess Sugnaux (Switzerland) Ylena In-Albon (Japan) Shiho Akita
February 1	Monastir, Tunisia; Hard; W15; Singles and Doubles Draws	(Czech Republic) Linda Fruhvirtová; 7–6^{(7–5)}, 7–5	(France) Manon Arcangioli	(India) Zeel Desai (France) Mallaurie Noël	(Italy) Angelica Moratelli (Algeria) Inès Ibbou (United Kingdom) Emilie Lindh (Czech Republic) Zdena Šafářová
February 1	Monastir, Tunisia; Hard; W15; Singles and Doubles Draws	(Czech Republic) Linda Fruhvirtová (Russia) Maria Timofeeva; 6–1, 6–2	(France) Nina Radovanovic (Georgia (country)) Sopiko Tsitskishvili	(India) Zeel Desai (France) Mallaurie Noël	(Italy) Angelica Moratelli (Algeria) Inès Ibbou (United Kingdom) Emilie Lindh (Czech Republic) Zdena Šafářová
February 1	Antalya, Turkey; Clay; W15; Singles and Doubles Draws	(Romania) Miriam Bulgaru; 6–2, 6–3	(South Korea) Park So-hyun	(Croatia) Tara Würth (Turkey) Berfu Cengiz	(Greece) Sapfo Sakellaridi (Russia) Julia Avdeeva (Argentina) Victoria Bosio (Brazil) Ingrid Gamarra Martins
February 1	Antalya, Turkey; Clay; W15; Singles and Doubles Draws	(Colombia) María Herazo González (Colombia) Yuliana Lizarazo; 6–2, 6–1	(Bulgaria) Petia Arshinkova (Bulgaria) Gergana Topalova	(Croatia) Tara Würth (Turkey) Berfu Cengiz	(Greece) Sapfo Sakellaridi (Russia) Julia Avdeeva (Argentina) Victoria Bosio (Brazil) Ingrid Gamarra Martins
February 8	Grenoble, France; Hard (indoor); W25; Singles and Doubles Draws	(Switzerland) Viktorija Golubic; 6–1, 4–6, 7–6^{(7–2)}	(Belgium) Maryna Zanevska	(Belgium) Marie Benoît (Poland) Maja Chwalińska	(China) Lu Jiajing (Czech Republic) Tereza Martincová (Philippines) Alex Eala (Denmark) Clara Tauson
February 8	Grenoble, France; Hard (indoor); W25; Singles and Doubles Draws	(Romania) Ioana Loredana Roșca (Belgium) Kimberley Zimmermann; 6–1, 7–5	(Netherlands) Arianne Hartono (Japan) Yuriko Lily Miyazaki	(Belgium) Marie Benoît (Poland) Maja Chwalińska	(China) Lu Jiajing (Czech Republic) Tereza Martincová (Philippines) Alex Eala (Denmark) Clara Tauson
February 8	Potchefstroom, South Africa; Hard; W25; Singles and Doubles Draws	(Spain) Nuria Párrizas Díaz; 6–1, 4–6, 6–2	(Hungary) Anna Bondár	(Netherlands) Lesley Pattinama Kerkhove (United Kingdom) Jodie Burrage	(Spain) Eva Guerrero Álvarez (South Africa) Zoë Kruger (Hungary) Réka Luca Jani (Brazil) Carolina Alves
February 8	Potchefstroom, South Africa; Hard; W25; Singles and Doubles Draws	(Netherlands) Lesley Pattinama Kerkhove (Netherlands) Bibiane Schoofs; 4–6, 6–3, [10–6]	(United Kingdom) Naomi Broady (United Kingdom) Eden Silva	(Netherlands) Lesley Pattinama Kerkhove (United Kingdom) Jodie Burrage	(Spain) Eva Guerrero Álvarez (South Africa) Zoë Kruger (Hungary) Réka Luca Jani (Brazil) Carolina Alves
February 8	Sharm El Sheikh, Egypt; Hard; W15; Singles and Doubles Draws	(Italy) Lucia Bronzetti; 7–6^{(7–4)}, 6–0	(Bosnia and Herzegovina) Nefisa Berberović	(Ukraine) Ganna Poznikhirenko (United States) Emma Davis	(France) Julie Belgraver (Japan) Miyabi Inoue (Belarus) Shalimar Talbi (Czech Republic) Anna Sisková
February 8	Sharm El Sheikh, Egypt; Hard; W15; Singles and Doubles Draws	(Czech Republic) Kristýna Lavičková (Czech Republic) Anna Sisková; 7–6^{(7–0)}, 6–4	(Japan) Miharu Imanishi (Lithuania) Justina Mikulskytė	(Ukraine) Ganna Poznikhirenko (United States) Emma Davis	(France) Julie Belgraver (Japan) Miyabi Inoue (Belarus) Shalimar Talbi (Czech Republic) Anna Sisková
February 8	Shymkent, Kazakhstan; Hard (indoor); W15; Singles and Doubles Draws	(Russia) Anastasia Tikhonova; 7–5, 2–6, 7–6^{(7–2)}	(Belarus) Yuliya Hatouka	(Uzbekistan) Sabina Sharipova (Russia) Daria Mishina	(Kazakhstan) Zhibek Kulambayeva (Russia) Ekaterina Kazionova (Kazakhstan) Gozal Ainitdinova (Czech Republic) Nikola Břečková
February 8	Shymkent, Kazakhstan; Hard (indoor); W15; Singles and Doubles Draws	(Russia) Ekaterina Kazionova (Uzbekistan) Sabina Sharipova; 7–5, 2–6, [10–4]	(Russia) Daria Mishina (Russia) Noel Saidenova	(Uzbekistan) Sabina Sharipova (Russia) Daria Mishina	(Kazakhstan) Zhibek Kulambayeva (Russia) Ekaterina Kazionova (Kazakhstan) Gozal Ainitdinova (Czech Republic) Nikola Břečková
February 8	Villena, Spain; Hard; W15; Singles and Doubles Draws	(Brazil) Laura Pigossi; 3–6, 6–0, 6–4	(Russia) Ekaterina Yashina	(South Korea) Ku Yeon-woo (Latvia) Kamilla Bartone	(United Kingdom) Matilda Mutavdzic (Spain) Rosa Vicens Mas (Spain) María Gutiérrez Carrasco (Portugal) Francisca Jorge
February 8	Villena, Spain; Hard; W15; Singles and Doubles Draws	(Spain) Alba Carrillo Marín (Spain) Ángela Fita Boluda; 7–5, 7–5	(Netherlands) Eva Vedder (Netherlands) Stéphanie Visscher	(South Korea) Ku Yeon-woo (Latvia) Kamilla Bartone	(United Kingdom) Matilda Mutavdzic (Spain) Rosa Vicens Mas (Spain) María Gutiérrez Carrasco (Portugal) Francisca Jorge
February 8	Monastir, Tunisia; Hard; W15; Singles and Doubles Draws	(Czech Republic) Linda Fruhvirtová; 6–2, 6–2	(Algeria) Inès Ibbou	(Belarus) Kristina Dmitruk (France) Yasmine Mansouri	(Italy) Angelica Moratelli (Finland) Anastasia Kulikova (Russia) Maria Timofeeva (Poland) Weronika Falkowska
February 8	Monastir, Tunisia; Hard; W15; Singles and Doubles Draws	(Poland) Weronika Falkowska (Czech Republic) Linda Fruhvirtová; 6–3, 6–1	(France) Yasmine Mansouri (Serbia) Elena Milovanović	(Belarus) Kristina Dmitruk (France) Yasmine Mansouri	(Italy) Angelica Moratelli (Finland) Anastasia Kulikova (Russia) Maria Timofeeva (Poland) Weronika Falkowska
February 8	Antalya, Turkey; Clay; W15; Singles and Doubles Draws	(Russia) Polina Kudermetova; 6–2, 1–6, 6–3	(Spain) Marta Custic	(Sweden) Caijsa Hennemann (Japan) Mei Yamaguchi	(Turkey) İpek Öz (Croatia) Tara Würth (United States) Jessie Aney (Italy) Matilde Paoletti
February 8	Antalya, Turkey; Clay; W15; Singles and Doubles Draws	(Hungary) Dorka Drahota-Szabó (Sweden) Caijsa Hennemann; 6–2, 6–1	(Russia) Polina Bakhmutkina (Russia) Eva Garkusha	(Sweden) Caijsa Hennemann (Japan) Mei Yamaguchi	(Turkey) İpek Öz (Croatia) Tara Würth (United States) Jessie Aney (Italy) Matilde Paoletti
February 15	Altenkirchen, Germany; Carpet (indoor); W25; Singles and Doubles Draws	(Denmark) Clara Tauson; 3–6, 6–1, 6–3	(Switzerland) Simona Waltert	(Switzerland) Susan Bandecchi (Switzerland) Viktorija Golubic	(Bulgaria) Viktoriya Tomova (Germany) Jule Niemeier (Spain) Cristina Bucșa (Belgium) Maryna Zanevska
February 15	Altenkirchen, Germany; Carpet (indoor); W25; Singles and Doubles Draws	(Poland) Paula Kania-Choduń (Germany) Julia Wachaczyk; 7–6^{(7–5)}, 6–4	(Switzerland) Viktorija Golubic (Switzerland) Ylena In-Albon	(Switzerland) Susan Bandecchi (Switzerland) Viktorija Golubic	(Bulgaria) Viktoriya Tomova (Germany) Jule Niemeier (Spain) Cristina Bucșa (Belgium) Maryna Zanevska
February 15	Potchefstroom, South Africa; Hard; W25; Singles and Doubles Draws	(Spain) Nuria Párrizas Díaz; 6–3, 6–0	(Canada) Carol Zhao	(Liechtenstein) Kathinka von Deichmann (South Africa) Chanel Simmonds	(Netherlands) Lesley Pattinama Kerkhove (Russia) Anastasia Zakharova (Hungary) Réka Luca Jani (Czech Republic) Jesika Malečková
February 15	Potchefstroom, South Africa; Hard; W25; Singles and Doubles Draws	(Czech Republic) Miriam Kolodziejová (Czech Republic) Jesika Malečková; 6–2, 3–6, [10–5]	(Hungary) Anna Bondár (Hungary) Réka Luca Jani	(Liechtenstein) Kathinka von Deichmann (South Africa) Chanel Simmonds	(Netherlands) Lesley Pattinama Kerkhove (Russia) Anastasia Zakharova (Hungary) Réka Luca Jani (Czech Republic) Jesika Malečková
February 15	Orlando, United States; Hard; W25; Singles and Doubles Draws	(United Kingdom) Katie Swan; 6–1, 6–3	(United States) Robin Anderson	(United States) Claire Liu (Mexico) Renata Zarazúa	(Ukraine) Anhelina Kalinina (Russia) Amina Anshba (Colombia) Camila Osorio (United States) Katie Volynets
February 15	Orlando, United States; Hard; W25; Singles and Doubles Draws	(United States) Emina Bektas (United Kingdom) Tara Moore; 7–5, 2–6, [10–5]	(Colombia) Camila Osorio (Switzerland) Conny Perrin	(United States) Claire Liu (Mexico) Renata Zarazúa	(Ukraine) Anhelina Kalinina (Russia) Amina Anshba (Colombia) Camila Osorio (United States) Katie Volynets
February 15	Sharm El Sheikh, Egypt; Hard; W15; Singles and Doubles Draws	(Belarus) Shalimar Talbi; 6–3, 2–6, 6–3	(Czech Republic) Linda Nosková	(Croatia) Antonia Ružić (Netherlands) Lian Tran	(Chinese Taipei) Liang En-shuo (Belgium) Magali Kempen (Italy) Dalila Spiteri (Sweden) Fanny Östlund
February 15	Sharm El Sheikh, Egypt; Hard; W15; Singles and Doubles Draws	(Japan) Erika Sema (Belarus) Shalimar Talbi; 2–6, 6–0, [14–12]	(Japan) Miyabi Inoue (Chinese Taipei) Liang En-shuo	(Croatia) Antonia Ružić (Netherlands) Lian Tran	(Chinese Taipei) Liang En-shuo (Belgium) Magali Kempen (Italy) Dalila Spiteri (Sweden) Fanny Östlund
February 15	Monastir, Tunisia; Hard; W15; Singles and Doubles Draws	(Poland) Weronika Falkowska; 6–3, 6–3	(Slovakia) Viktória Morvayová	(Russia) Maria Timofeeva (Finland) Anastasia Kulikova	(France) Nina Radovanovic (Spain) Almudena Sanz-Llaneza Fernández (Germany) Kathleen Kanev (Romania) Karola Bejenaru
February 15	Monastir, Tunisia; Hard; W15; Singles and Doubles Draws	(Poland) Weronika Falkowska (Slovakia) Viktória Morvayová; 6–4, 7–5	(Romania) Karola Bejenaru (Czech Republic) Zdena Šafářová	(Russia) Maria Timofeeva (Finland) Anastasia Kulikova	(France) Nina Radovanovic (Spain) Almudena Sanz-Llaneza Fernández (Germany) Kathleen Kanev (Romania) Karola Bejenaru
February 15	Antalya, Turkey; Clay; W15; Singles and Doubles Draws	(Romania) Andreea Prisăcariu; 6–3, 7–5	(Italy) Aurora Zantedeschi	(Romania) Cristina Dinu (Bulgaria) Gergana Topalova	(South Korea) Park So-hyun (Ecuador) Mell Reasco (Brazil) Ingrid Gamarra Martins (Latvia) Daniela Vismane
February 15	Antalya, Turkey; Clay; W15; Singles and Doubles Draws	(Romania) Cristina Dinu (Slovakia) Chantal Škamlová; 6–1, 6–3	(Colombia) María Herazo González (Colombia) Yuliana Lizarazo	(Romania) Cristina Dinu (Bulgaria) Gergana Topalova	(South Korea) Park So-hyun (Ecuador) Mell Reasco (Brazil) Ingrid Gamarra Martins (Latvia) Daniela Vismane
February 22	Poitiers, France; Hard (indoor); W25; Singles and Doubles Draws	(Ukraine) Daria Snigur; 6–3, 2–6, 7–5	(France) Clara Burel	(Netherlands) Suzan Lamens (Croatia) Jana Fett	(Turkey) Pemra Özgen (Australia) Seone Mendez (Japan) Yuriko Lily Miyazaki (Italy) Camilla Rosatello
February 22	Poitiers, France; Hard (indoor); W25; Singles and Doubles Draws	(Italy) Federica Di Sarra (Italy) Camilla Rosatello; 6–4, 6–3	(France) Estelle Cascino (Australia) Seone Mendez	(Netherlands) Suzan Lamens (Croatia) Jana Fett	(Turkey) Pemra Özgen (Australia) Seone Mendez (Japan) Yuriko Lily Miyazaki (Italy) Camilla Rosatello
February 22	Boca Raton, United States; Hard; W25; Singles and Doubles Draws	(United States) Varvara Lepchenko; 3–6, 6–4, 6–0	(United States) Claire Liu	(United States) Hailey Baptiste (United States) Usue Maitane Arconada	(Croatia) Tereza Mrdeža (Canada) Katherine Sebov (Romania) Gabriela Talabă (Colombia) Camila Osorio
February 22	Boca Raton, United States; Hard; W25; Singles and Doubles Draws	(United States) Usue Maitane Arconada (United States) Caroline Dolehide; 6–3, 6–4	(Colombia) Camila Osorio (Switzerland) Conny Perrin	(United States) Hailey Baptiste (United States) Usue Maitane Arconada	(Croatia) Tereza Mrdeža (Canada) Katherine Sebov (Romania) Gabriela Talabă (Colombia) Camila Osorio
February 22	Moscow, Russia; Hard (indoor); W25; Singles and Doubles Draws	(Poland) Urszula Radwańska; 4–6, 6–3, 6–4	(Belarus) Yuliya Hatouka	(Russia) Anastasia Zakharova (Turkey) Berfu Cengiz	(Russia) Valeriya Yushchenko (Russia) Anastasia Tikhonova (Russia) Olga Doroshina (Bulgaria) Isabella Shinikova
February 22	Moscow, Russia; Hard (indoor); W25; Singles and Doubles Draws	(Greece) Valentini Grammatikopoulou (Russia) Anastasia Zakharova; 6–3, 5–7, [10–8]	(Russia) Ekaterina Kazionova (Belarus) Shalimar Talbi	(Russia) Anastasia Zakharova (Turkey) Berfu Cengiz	(Russia) Valeriya Yushchenko (Russia) Anastasia Tikhonova (Russia) Olga Doroshina (Bulgaria) Isabella Shinikova
February 22	Sharm El Sheikh, Egypt; Hard; W15; Singles and Doubles Draws	(Latvia) Sabīne Rutlauka; 6–7^{(4–7)}, 7–5, 7–5	(Switzerland) Svenja Ochsner	(Czech Republic) Linda Nosková (Russia) Erika Andreeva	(Japan) Ayano Shimizu (Russia) Alina Charaeva (Denmark) Olga Helmi (Japan) Miyabi Inoue
February 22	Sharm El Sheikh, Egypt; Hard; W15; Singles and Doubles Draws	(Japan) Lisa-Marie Rioux (Japan) Erika Sema; 6–1, 1–6, [10–6]	(Sweden) Kajsa Rinaldo Persson (Sweden) Julita Saner	(Czech Republic) Linda Nosková (Russia) Erika Andreeva	(Japan) Ayano Shimizu (Russia) Alina Charaeva (Denmark) Olga Helmi (Japan) Miyabi Inoue
February 22	Monastir, Tunisia; Hard; W15; Singles and Doubles Draws	(Poland) Weronika Falkowska; 6–2, 6–0	(Malta) Francesca Curmi	(Slovakia) Viktória Morvayová (Switzerland) Valentina Ryser	(Japan) Risa Ushijima (Romania) Karola Bejenaru (Finland) Anastasia Kulikova (Switzerland) Sebastianna Scilipoti
February 22	Monastir, Tunisia; Hard; W15; Singles and Doubles Draws	(Romania) Karola Bejenaru (Romania) Ilona Georgiana Ghioroaie; 1–6, 7–6^{(9–7)}, [12–10]	(Poland) Weronika Falkowska (Slovakia) Viktória Morvayová	(Slovakia) Viktória Morvayová (Switzerland) Valentina Ryser	(Japan) Risa Ushijima (Romania) Karola Bejenaru (Finland) Anastasia Kulikova (Switzerland) Sebastianna Scilipoti
February 22	Antalya, Turkey; Clay; W15; Singles and Doubles Draws	(Bosnia and Herzegovina) Dea Herdželaš; 6–7^{(1–7)}, 6–2, 7–5	(Italy) Nuria Brancaccio	(Greece) Sapfo Sakellaridi (South Korea) Park So-hyun	(Ecuador) Mell Reasco (Argentina) Victoria Bosio (Czech Republic) Darja Viďmanová (Romania) Andreea Prisăcariu
February 22	Antalya, Turkey; Clay; W15; Singles and Doubles Draws	(Croatia) Mariana Dražić (Romania) Oana Georgeta Simion; 4–6, 6–3, [12–10]	(Spain) Jéssica Bouzas Maneiro (Netherlands) Lexie Stevens	(Greece) Sapfo Sakellaridi (South Korea) Park So-hyun	(Ecuador) Mell Reasco (Argentina) Victoria Bosio (Czech Republic) Darja Viďmanová (Romania) Andreea Prisăcariu

=== March ===
Week of	Tournament	Winner	Runners-up	Semifinalists	Quarterfinalists
March 1	Manacor, Spain; Hard; W25; Singles and Doubles Draws	(Spain) Nuria Párrizas Díaz; 6–2, 6–1	(Spain) Marina Bassols Ribera	(Italy) Federica Di Sarra (Italy) Jessica Pieri	(Romania) Irina Fetecău (Netherlands) Arianne Hartono (Croatia) Jana Fett (Germany) Stephanie Wagner
March 1	Manacor, Spain; Hard; W25; Singles and Doubles Draws	(Hungary) Réka Luca Jani (Belgium) Lara Salden; 6–4, 7–5	(Hungary) Anna Bondár (Slovakia) Tereza Mihalíková	(Italy) Federica Di Sarra (Italy) Jessica Pieri	(Romania) Irina Fetecău (Netherlands) Arianne Hartono (Croatia) Jana Fett (Germany) Stephanie Wagner
March 1	Newport Beach, United States; Hard; W25; Singles and Doubles Draws	(United States) Danielle Lao; 6–2, 4–6, 6–2	(United States) Claire Liu	(Brazil) Beatriz Haddad Maia (Switzerland) Conny Perrin	(Croatia) Tereza Mrdeža (Ukraine) Kateryna Bondarenko (Spain) Andrea Lázaro García (Georgia (country)) Mariam Bolkvadze
March 1	Newport Beach, United States; Hard; W25; Singles and Doubles Draws	(United States) Vania King (United States) Maegan Manasse; 6–4, 6–2	(United States) Emina Bektas (United Kingdom) Tara Moore	(Brazil) Beatriz Haddad Maia (Switzerland) Conny Perrin	(Croatia) Tereza Mrdeža (Ukraine) Kateryna Bondarenko (Spain) Andrea Lázaro García (Georgia (country)) Mariam Bolkvadze
March 1	Sharm El Sheikh, Egypt; Hard; W15; Singles and Doubles Draws	(Russia) Erika Andreeva; 1–6, 7–6^{(7–3)}, 6–0	(Switzerland) Jenny Dürst	(Latvia) Sabīne Rutlauka (Japan) Momoko Kobori	(Japan) Ayano Shimizu (Japan) Ramu Ueda (Japan) Mana Ayukawa (Switzerland) Joanne Züger
March 1	Sharm El Sheikh, Egypt; Hard; W15; Singles and Doubles Draws	(Japan) Erika Sema (Czech Republic) Anna Sisková; 1–6, 6–4, ret.	(Japan) Mana Ayukawa (Japan) Ayano Shimizu	(Latvia) Sabīne Rutlauka (Japan) Momoko Kobori	(Japan) Ayano Shimizu (Japan) Ramu Ueda (Japan) Mana Ayukawa (Switzerland) Joanne Züger
March 1	New Delhi, India; Hard; W15; Singles and Doubles Draws	(Slovenia) Pia Lovrič; 6–3, 6–4	(Russia) Irina Khromacheva	(India) Zeel Desai (Hungary) Adrienn Nagy	(India) Jennifer Luikham (India) Humera Baharmus (India) Rutuja Bhosale (Romania) Miriam Bulgaru
March 1	New Delhi, India; Hard; W15; Singles and Doubles Draws	(Slovenia) Pia Lovrič (Hungary) Adrienn Nagy; 6–2, 6–3	(India) Sowjanya Bavisetti (India) Prarthana Thombare	(India) Zeel Desai (Hungary) Adrienn Nagy	(India) Jennifer Luikham (India) Humera Baharmus (India) Rutuja Bhosale (Romania) Miriam Bulgaru
March 1	Monastir, Tunisia; Hard; W15; Singles and Doubles Draws	(Poland) Weronika Falkowska; 6–3, 7–6^{(7–1)}	(Austria) Sinja Kraus	(Brazil) Laura Pigossi (United States) Chiara Scholl	(Serbia) Mihaela Đaković (Slovakia) Viktória Morvayová (Belgium) Clara Vlasselaer (Japan) Risa Ushijima
March 1	Monastir, Tunisia; Hard; W15; Singles and Doubles Draws	(Netherlands) Merel Hoedt (Belgium) Eliessa Vanlangendonck; 6–2, 2–6, [10–5]	(Sweden) Jacqueline Cabaj Awad (Netherlands) Suzan Lamens	(Brazil) Laura Pigossi (United States) Chiara Scholl	(Serbia) Mihaela Đaković (Slovakia) Viktória Morvayová (Belgium) Clara Vlasselaer (Japan) Risa Ushijima
March 1	Antalya, Turkey; Clay; W15; Singles and Doubles Draws	(Italy) Nuria Brancaccio; 7–5, 6–4	(South Korea) Jang Su-jeong	(Romania) Andreea Prisăcariu (South Korea) Park So-hyun	(Argentina) Jazmín Ortenzi (Slovenia) Nika Radišić (Netherlands) Lexie Stevens (Russia) Darya Astakhova
March 1	Antalya, Turkey; Clay; W15; Singles and Doubles Draws	(United States) Jessie Aney (Brazil) Ingrid Gamarra Martins; 6–2, 6–2	(South Korea) Jang Su-jeong (South Korea) Park So-hyun	(Romania) Andreea Prisăcariu (South Korea) Park So-hyun	(Argentina) Jazmín Ortenzi (Slovenia) Nika Radišić (Netherlands) Lexie Stevens (Russia) Darya Astakhova
March 8	Pune, India; Hard; W25; Singles and Doubles Draws	(Brazil) Laura Pigossi; 6–0, 3–6, 7–6^{(7–5)}	(Ukraine) Marianna Zakarlyuk	(United Kingdom) Emily Webley-Smith (Romania) Miriam Bulgaru	(India) Vaidehi Chaudhari (India) Zeel Desai (India) Rutuja Bhosale (Russia) Irina Khromacheva
March 8	Pune, India; Hard; W25; Singles and Doubles Draws	(India) Rutuja Bhosale (United Kingdom) Emily Webley-Smith; 6–2, 7–5	(India) Riya Bhatia (Romania) Miriam Bulgaru	(United Kingdom) Emily Webley-Smith (Romania) Miriam Bulgaru	(India) Vaidehi Chaudhari (India) Zeel Desai (India) Rutuja Bhosale (Russia) Irina Khromacheva
March 8	Kazan, Russia; Hard (indoor); W25; Singles and Doubles Draws	(Belarus) Yuliya Hatouka; 7–6^{(8–6)}, 4–6, 6–4	(Poland) Urszula Radwańska	(Russia) Anastasia Tikhonova (Russia) Ekaterina Yashina	(Russia) Alina Charaeva (Greece) Valentini Grammatikopoulou (Russia) Polina Kudermetova (Turkey) Berfu Cengiz
March 8	Kazan, Russia; Hard (indoor); W25; Singles and Doubles Draws	(Norway) Ulrikke Eikeri (Belarus) Shalimar Talbi; 6–4, 6–0	(Greece) Valentini Grammatikopoulou (Russia) Anastasia Zakharova	(Russia) Anastasia Tikhonova (Russia) Ekaterina Yashina	(Russia) Alina Charaeva (Greece) Valentini Grammatikopoulou (Russia) Polina Kudermetova (Turkey) Berfu Cengiz
March 8	Sharm El Sheikh, Egypt; Hard; W15; Singles and Doubles Draws	(Japan) Yuriko Lily Miyazaki; 6–2, 4–6, 6–3	(Japan) Momoko Kobori	(Japan) Ayano Shimizu (Japan) Sakura Hosogi	(Slovakia) Katarína Kužmová (Switzerland) Joanne Züger (United States) Elizabeth Mandlik (Japan) Miyabi Inoue
March 8	Sharm El Sheikh, Egypt; Hard; W15; Singles and Doubles Draws	(Japan) Momoko Kobori (Japan) Ayano Shimizu; 6–1, 6–2	(Slovakia) Barbora Matúšová (Russia) Anastasia Zolotareva	(Japan) Ayano Shimizu (Japan) Sakura Hosogi	(Slovakia) Katarína Kužmová (Switzerland) Joanne Züger (United States) Elizabeth Mandlik (Japan) Miyabi Inoue
March 8	Amiens, France; Clay (indoor); W15+H; Singles and Doubles Draws	(Australia) Seone Mendez; 6–4, 6–2	(Argentina) Paula Ormaechea	(France) Elsa Jacquemot (France) Audrey Albié	(Italy) Verena Meliss (France) Lucie Nguyen Tan (Italy) Martina Spigarelli (France) Marine Partaud
March 8	Amiens, France; Clay (indoor); W15+H; Singles and Doubles Draws	(Australia) Seone Mendez (Mexico) María José Portillo Ramírez; 6–4, 6–3	(France) Elsa Jacquemot (Andorra) Victoria Jiménez Kasintseva	(France) Elsa Jacquemot (France) Audrey Albié	(Italy) Verena Meliss (France) Lucie Nguyen Tan (Italy) Martina Spigarelli (France) Marine Partaud
March 8	Manacor, Spain; Hard; W15; Singles and Doubles Draws	(Spain) Marina Bassols Ribera; 7–5, 6–2	(Italy) Camilla Rosatello	(Spain) Rosa Vicens Mas (Spain) Leyre Romero Gormaz	(Spain) Rebeka Masarova (Switzerland) Simona Waltert (France) Margot Yerolymos (Latvia) Diāna Marcinkēviča
March 8	Manacor, Spain; Hard; W15; Singles and Doubles Draws	(Spain) Ángela Fita Boluda (Russia) Oksana Selekhmeteva; 6–2, 5–7, [10–8]	(Switzerland) Ylena In-Albon (Spain) Rebeka Masarova	(Spain) Rosa Vicens Mas (Spain) Leyre Romero Gormaz	(Spain) Rebeka Masarova (Switzerland) Simona Waltert (France) Margot Yerolymos (Latvia) Diāna Marcinkēviča
March 8	Monastir, Tunisia; Hard; W15; Singles and Doubles Draws	(Belarus) Jana Kolodynska; 1–6, 6–0, 7–6^{(7–5)}	(Italy) Lucrezia Stefanini	(Netherlands) Suzan Lamens (United States) Anastasia Nefedova	(France) Salma Djoubri (Serbia) Bojana Marinković (Belgium) Eliessa Vanlangendonck (Spain) Ana Lantigua de la Nuez
March 8	Monastir, Tunisia; Hard; W15; Singles and Doubles Draws	(Romania) Oana Gavrilă (Romania) Ilona Georgiana Ghioroaie; 7–5, 6–4	(United Kingdom) Anna Popescu (United States) Chiara Scholl	(Netherlands) Suzan Lamens (United States) Anastasia Nefedova	(France) Salma Djoubri (Serbia) Bojana Marinković (Belgium) Eliessa Vanlangendonck (Spain) Ana Lantigua de la Nuez
March 8	Antalya, Turkey; Clay; W15; Singles and Doubles Draws	(South Korea) Park So-hyun; 6–4, 6–0	(Italy) Nuria Brancaccio	(Czech Republic) Miriam Kolodziejová (United States) Jessie Aney	(Bulgaria) Gergana Topalova (Russia) Polina Leykina (Italy) Lisa Pigato (Germany) Sina Herrmann
March 8	Antalya, Turkey; Clay; W15; Singles and Doubles Draws	(Czech Republic) Miriam Kolodziejová (Czech Republic) Aneta Laboutková; 6–3, 4–6, [10–6]	(Russia) Darya Astakhova (Slovenia) Nika Radišić	(Czech Republic) Miriam Kolodziejová (United States) Jessie Aney	(Bulgaria) Gergana Topalova (Russia) Polina Leykina (Italy) Lisa Pigato (Germany) Sina Herrmann
March 15	Sharm El Sheikh, Egypt; Hard; W15; Singles and Doubles Draws	(Japan) Sakura Hosogi; 7–5, 6–2	(Japan) Eri Hozumi	(Japan) Ayano Shimizu (Italy) Dalila Spiteri	(United States) Elizabeth Mandlik (Japan) Momoko Kobori (Japan) Yuriko Lily Miyazaki (United Kingdom) Matilda Mutavdzic
March 15	Sharm El Sheikh, Egypt; Hard; W15; Singles and Doubles Draws	(Japan) Momoko Kobori (Japan) Ayano Shimizu; 6–4, 6–1	(United Kingdom) Alicia Barnett (Japan) Yuriko Lily Miyazaki	(Japan) Ayano Shimizu (Italy) Dalila Spiteri	(United States) Elizabeth Mandlik (Japan) Momoko Kobori (Japan) Yuriko Lily Miyazaki (United Kingdom) Matilda Mutavdzic
March 15	Gonesse, France; Clay (indoor); W15; Singles and Doubles Draws	(France) Marine Partaud; 6–4, 6–3	(Spain) Jéssica Bouzas Maneiro	(France) Estelle Cascino (France) Émeline Dartron	(France) Jenifer Anger (Switzerland) Tess Sugnaux (France) Jade Suvrijn (Germany) Yana Morderger
March 15	Gonesse, France; Clay (indoor); W15; Singles and Doubles Draws	(Slovenia) Tina Cvetkovič (United States) Zoe Howard; 6–7^{(5–7)}, 6–3, [10–5]	(Germany) Anna Gabric (Germany) Lena Papadakis	(France) Estelle Cascino (France) Émeline Dartron	(France) Jenifer Anger (Switzerland) Tess Sugnaux (France) Jade Suvrijn (Germany) Yana Morderger
March 15	Bratislava, Slovakia; Hard (indoor); W15; Singles and Doubles Draws	(Czech Republic) Linda Nosková; 4–6, 7–6^{(7–4)}, 7–5	(Czech Republic) Tereza Smitková	(Slovakia) Rebecca Šramková (Slovakia) Katarína Kužmová	(Norway) Malene Helgø (Slovakia) Chantal Škamlová (Poland) Weronika Baszak (Estonia) Elena Malõgina
March 15	Bratislava, Slovakia; Hard (indoor); W15; Singles and Doubles Draws	(Estonia) Elena Malõgina (France) Alice Robbe; 7–6^{(7–2)}, 6–2	(Slovenia) Nina Potočnik (Croatia) Iva Primorac	(Slovakia) Rebecca Šramková (Slovakia) Katarína Kužmová	(Norway) Malene Helgø (Slovakia) Chantal Škamlová (Poland) Weronika Baszak (Estonia) Elena Malõgina
March 15	Monastir, Tunisia; Hard; W15; Singles and Doubles Draws	(Czech Republic) Monika Kilnarová; 2–6, 6–2, 6–4	(United States) Anastasia Nefedova	(Finland) Anastasia Kulikova (Russia) Maria Timofeeva	(Italy) Lucrezia Stefanini (Netherlands) Suzan Lamens (France) Salma Djoubri (Romania) Oana Gavrilă
March 15	Monastir, Tunisia; Hard; W15; Singles and Doubles Draws	(Netherlands) Isabelle Haverlag (Russia) Anastasia Pribylova; 6–3, 6–1	(Japan) Rina Saigo (Japan) Yukina Saigo	(Finland) Anastasia Kulikova (Russia) Maria Timofeeva	(Italy) Lucrezia Stefanini (Netherlands) Suzan Lamens (France) Salma Djoubri (Romania) Oana Gavrilă
March 15	Antalya, Turkey; Clay; W15; Singles and Doubles Draws	(South Korea) Jang Su-jeong; 4–6, 6–3, 6–2	(Japan) Mai Hontama	(Croatia) Tara Würth (Czech Republic) Johana Marková	(South Korea) Park So-hyun (Germany) Alexandra Vecic (Romania) Cristina Dinu (Ukraine) Anastasiya Soboleva
March 15	Antalya, Turkey; Clay; W15; Singles and Doubles Draws	(South Korea) Han Na-lae (South Korea) Lee So-ra; 4–6, 7–5, [10–4]	(United States) Jessie Aney (South Korea) Park So-hyun	(Croatia) Tara Würth (Czech Republic) Johana Marková	(South Korea) Park So-hyun (Germany) Alexandra Vecic (Romania) Cristina Dinu (Ukraine) Anastasiya Soboleva
March 22	Buenos Aires, Argentina; Clay; W25; Singles and Doubles Draws	(Japan) Yuki Naito; 1–6, 6–4, 6–3	(Brazil) Carolina Alves	(Italy) Giulia Gatto-Monticone (United Kingdom) Francesca Jones	(Ecuador) Mell Reasco (Spain) Irene Burillo Escorihuela (Spain) Yvonne Cavallé Reimers (Spain) Nuria Párrizas Díaz
March 22	Buenos Aires, Argentina; Clay; W25; Singles and Doubles Draws	(Russia) Amina Anshba (Hungary) Panna Udvardy; 7–5, 6–2	(Greece) Valentini Grammatikopoulou (Netherlands) Richèl Hogenkamp	(Italy) Giulia Gatto-Monticone (United Kingdom) Francesca Jones	(Ecuador) Mell Reasco (Spain) Irene Burillo Escorihuela (Spain) Yvonne Cavallé Reimers (Spain) Nuria Párrizas Díaz
March 22	Sharm El Sheikh, Egypt; Hard; W15; Singles and Doubles Draws	(Japan) Yuriko Lily Miyazaki; 6–3, 6–3	(United Kingdom) Matilda Mutavdzic	(Chinese Taipei) Lee Ya-hsuan (Australia) Olivia Gadecki	(Romania) Elena-Teodora Cadar (Brazil) Thaisa Grana Pedretti (Italy) Dalila Spiteri (Switzerland) Joanne Züger
March 22	Sharm El Sheikh, Egypt; Hard; W15; Singles and Doubles Draws	(United Kingdom) Alicia Barnett (Japan) Yuriko Lily Miyazaki; 6–4, 6–1	(South Korea) Ku Yeon-woo (Canada) Raphaëlle Lacasse	(Chinese Taipei) Lee Ya-hsuan (Australia) Olivia Gadecki	(Romania) Elena-Teodora Cadar (Brazil) Thaisa Grana Pedretti (Italy) Dalila Spiteri (Switzerland) Joanne Züger
March 22	Le Havre, France; Clay (indoor); W15; Singles and Doubles Draws	(Italy) Lucia Bronzetti; 6–3, 6–1	(France) Sara Cakarevic	(France) Léolia Jeanjean (Italy) Camilla Rosatello	(Spain) Jéssica Bouzas Maneiro (France) Célia-Belle Mohr (France) Loïs Boisson (Mexico) María José Portillo Ramírez
March 22	Le Havre, France; Clay (indoor); W15; Singles and Doubles Draws	(Portugal) Francisca Jorge (Italy) Camilla Rosatello; 7–5, 6–2	(France) Anaëlle Leclercq (France) Lucie Nguyen Tan	(France) Léolia Jeanjean (Italy) Camilla Rosatello	(Spain) Jéssica Bouzas Maneiro (France) Célia-Belle Mohr (France) Loïs Boisson (Mexico) María José Portillo Ramírez
March 22	Bratislava, Slovakia; Hard (indoor); W15; Singles and Doubles Draws	(Czech Republic) Linda Nosková; 6–3, 7–6^{(7–4)}	(Croatia) Iva Primorac	(Russia) Alina Charaeva (Czech Republic) Tereza Smitková	(Slovakia) Rebecca Šramková (Czech Republic) Aneta Laboutková (Slovakia) Sofia Milatová (Hungary) Réka Luca Jani
March 22	Bratislava, Slovakia; Hard (indoor); W15; Singles and Doubles Draws	(Estonia) Elena Malõgina (France) Alice Robbe; 3–6, 6–3, [10–5]	(Czech Republic) Tereza Smitková (Czech Republic) Veronika Vlkovská	(Russia) Alina Charaeva (Czech Republic) Tereza Smitková	(Slovakia) Rebecca Šramková (Czech Republic) Aneta Laboutková (Slovakia) Sofia Milatová (Hungary) Réka Luca Jani
March 22	Monastir, Tunisia; Hard; W15; Singles and Doubles Draws	(Finland) Anastasia Kulikova; 6–4, 2–6, 6–3	(Netherlands) Suzan Lamens	(Netherlands) Eva Vedder (India) Karman Thandi	(Hungary) Vanda Lukács (Croatia) Antonia Ružić (United States) Amy Zhu (United States) Anastasia Nefedova
March 22	Monastir, Tunisia; Hard; W15; Singles and Doubles Draws	(Netherlands) Isabelle Haverlag (Russia) Anastasia Pribylova; 6–3, 6–1	(Finland) Anastasia Kulikova (France) Yasmine Mansouri	(Netherlands) Eva Vedder (India) Karman Thandi	(Hungary) Vanda Lukács (Croatia) Antonia Ružić (United States) Amy Zhu (United States) Anastasia Nefedova
March 22	Antalya, Turkey; Clay; W15; Singles and Doubles Draws	(Romania) Cristina Dinu; 6–2, 6–3	(Japan) Mai Hontama	(South Korea) Park So-hyun (Spain) Lucía Cortez Llorca	(Slovenia) Živa Falkner (Croatia) Tara Würth (Canada) Mélodie Collard (Romania) Oana Georgeta Simion
March 22	Antalya, Turkey; Clay; W15; Singles and Doubles Draws	(Germany) Sina Herrmann (South Korea) Jang Su-jeong; Walkover	(Czech Republic) Anastasia Dețiuc (Czech Republic) Darja Viďmanová	(South Korea) Park So-hyun (Spain) Lucía Cortez Llorca	(Slovenia) Živa Falkner (Croatia) Tara Würth (Canada) Mélodie Collard (Romania) Oana Georgeta Simion
March 29	Villa María, Argentina; Clay; W25; Singles and Doubles Draws	(Brazil) Beatriz Haddad Maia; 5–7, 6–4, 6–2	(United Kingdom) Francesca Jones	(Venezuela) Andrea Gámiz (Switzerland) Susan Bandecchi	(Russia) Amina Anshba (Argentina) María Lourdes Carlé (Hungary) Panna Udvardy (United Kingdom) Naiktha Bains
March 29	Villa María, Argentina; Clay; W25; Singles and Doubles Draws	(Greece) Valentini Grammatikopoulou (Netherlands) Richèl Hogenkamp; 6–2, 6–2	(Argentina) Victoria Bosio (Argentina) María Lourdes Carlé	(Venezuela) Andrea Gámiz (Switzerland) Susan Bandecchi	(Russia) Amina Anshba (Argentina) María Lourdes Carlé (Hungary) Panna Udvardy (United Kingdom) Naiktha Bains
March 29	Dubai, United Arab Emirates; Hard; W25; Singles and Doubles Draws	(United Kingdom) Jodie Burrage; 6–4, 6–3	(Belarus) Yuliya Hatouka	(South Korea) Han Na-lae (Russia) Anastasia Zakharova	(Liechtenstein) Kathinka von Deichmann (Bulgaria) Elitsa Kostova (Ukraine) Daria Snigur (Belarus) Shalimar Talbi
March 29	Dubai, United Arab Emirates; Hard; W25; Singles and Doubles Draws	(United States) Emina Bektas (United Kingdom) Tara Moore; 7–5, 4–6, [10–7]	(Turkey) Berfu Cengiz (Turkey) İpek Öz	(South Korea) Han Na-lae (Russia) Anastasia Zakharova	(Liechtenstein) Kathinka von Deichmann (Bulgaria) Elitsa Kostova (Ukraine) Daria Snigur (Belarus) Shalimar Talbi
March 29	Sharm El Sheikh, Egypt; Hard; W15; Singles and Doubles Draws	(New Zealand) Paige Hourigan; 3–6, 6–1, 6–2	(Czech Republic) Anna Sisková	(Italy) Dalila Spiteri (Israel) Lina Glushko	(Czech Republic) Barbora Palicová (Japan) Eri Hozumi (Russia) Anastasia Zolotareva (Russia) Anastasia Sukhotina
March 29	Sharm El Sheikh, Egypt; Hard; W15; Singles and Doubles Draws	(Romania) Elena-Teodora Cadar (Australia) Olivia Gadecki; 6–3, 6–4	(Canada) Raphaëlle Lacasse (Czech Republic) Anna Sisková	(Italy) Dalila Spiteri (Israel) Lina Glushko	(Czech Republic) Barbora Palicová (Japan) Eri Hozumi (Russia) Anastasia Zolotareva (Russia) Anastasia Sukhotina
March 29	Monastir, Tunisia; Hard; W15; Singles and Doubles Draws	(Belarus) Anna Kubareva; 6–1, 6–1	(Italy) Angelica Raggi	(Belgium) Magali Kempen (India) Karman Thandi	(Russia) Anastasia Pribylova (Belgium) Eliessa Vanlangendonck (France) Mallaurie Noël (Serbia) Lola Radivojević
March 29	Monastir, Tunisia; Hard; W15; Singles and Doubles Draws	(Netherlands) Isabelle Haverlag (Russia) Anastasia Pribylova; 6–3, 6–1	(Australia) Alexandra Osborne (Mexico) Andrea Renée Villarreal	(Belgium) Magali Kempen (India) Karman Thandi	(Russia) Anastasia Pribylova (Belgium) Eliessa Vanlangendonck (France) Mallaurie Noël (Serbia) Lola Radivojević
March 29	Antalya, Turkey; Clay; W15; Singles and Doubles Draws	(Romania) Andreea Prisăcariu; 6–3, 7–5	(Spain) Ane Mintegi del Olmo	(United States) Hanna Chang (South Korea) Jang Su-jeong	(Russia) Polina Leykina (Turkey) Özlem Uslu (Croatia) Tara Würth (South Korea) Park So-hyun
March 29	Antalya, Turkey; Clay; W15; Singles and Doubles Draws	(South Korea) Jang Su-jeong (South Korea) Lee So-ra; 6–2, 2–6, [10–7]	(Colombia) María Paulina Pérez (Mexico) María José Portillo Ramírez	(United States) Hanna Chang (South Korea) Jang Su-jeong	(Russia) Polina Leykina (Turkey) Özlem Uslu (Croatia) Tara Würth (South Korea) Park So-hyun
