= 2022 Georgia's Rome Tennis Open =

Tennis tournament

- Date: 31 January–6 February 2022
- Edition: 2nd
- Category: ITF Women's World Tennis Tour
- Prize money: $60,000
- Surface: Hard / Indoor
- Location: Rome, Georgia, United States

Champions

Singles
- (Germany) Tatjana Maria

Doubles
- (United States) Sophie Chang / (United States) Angela Kulikov
← 2021 ·	Georgia's Rome Tennis Open	· 2023 →

The 2022 Georgia's Rome Tennis Open was a professional tennis tournament played on indoor hard courts. It was the second edition of the tournament which was part of the 2022 ITF Women's World Tennis Tour. It took place in Rome, Georgia, United States between 30 January and 6 February 2022.

== Singles main-draw entrants ==
=== Seeds ===
Country	Player	Rank^{1}	Seed
MEX	Renata Zarazúa	130	1
BLR	Olga Govortsova	135	2
CHN	Wang Xiyu	139	3
CHN	Yuan Yue	156	4
USA	CoCo Vandeweghe	161	5
SUI	Leonie Küng	162	6
USA	Hailey Baptiste	165	7
~~USA~~	~~Grace Min~~	~~168~~	~~8~~

- ^{1} Rankings are as of 17 January 2022.

=== Other entrants ===
The following players received wildcards into the singles main draw:

- (United States) Emina Bektas
- (United States) Robin Montgomery
- (United States) Emma Navarro
- (United States) Alycia Parks

The following players received entry from the qualifying draw:

- (United States) Sophie Chang
- (United States) Louisa Chirico
- (United States) Dalayna Hewitt
- (Serbia) Katarina Jokić
- (Germany) Tatjana Maria
- (United States) Whitney Osuigwe
- (Switzerland) Lulu Sun
- (Mexico) Marcela Zacarías

The following player received entry as a lucky loser:

- (United States) Raveena Kingsley

== Champions ==
=== Singles ===
- (Germany) Tatjana Maria def. (United States) Alycia Parks, 6–4, 4–6, 6–2

=== Doubles ===
- (United States) Sophie Chang / (United States) Angela Kulikov def. (United States) Emina Bektas / (United Kingdom) Tara Moore, 6–3, 6–7^{(2–7)}, [10–7]
