= 2023 Georgia's Rome Tennis Open =

Tennis tournament

- Date: 30 January–5 February 2023
- Edition: 3rd
- Category: ITF Women's World Tennis Tour
- Prize money: $60,000
- Surface: Hard / Indoor
- Location: Rome, United States

Champions

Singles
- (United States) Peyton Stearns

Doubles
- (Hungary) Fanny Stollár / (Switzerland) Lulu Sun
← 2022 ·	Georgia's Rome Tennis Open	· 2023 →

The 2023 Georgia's Rome Tennis Open was a professional tennis tournament played on indoor hard courts. It was the third edition of the tournament, which was part of the 2023 ITF Women's World Tennis Tour. It took place in Rome, Georgia, United States, between 30 January and 5 February 2023.

== Champions ==
=== Singles ===
- (United States) Peyton Stearns def. (Czech Republic) Gabriela Knutson, 3–6, 6–0, 6–2

=== Doubles ===
- (Hungary) Fanny Stollár / (Switzerland) Lulu Sun def. (Japan) Mana Ayukawa / (Czech Republic) Gabriela Knutson, 6–3, 6–0

== Singles main draw entrants ==
=== Seeds ===
Country	Player	Rank	Seed
HUN	Panna Udvardy	89	1
USA	Elizabeth Mandlik	129	2
USA	Ann Li	168	3
USA	Ashlyn Krueger	181	4
CRO	Petra Marčinko	187	5
USA	Robin Anderson	188	6
USA	Kayla Day	193	7
MEX	Marcela Zacarías	207	8

- Rankings are as of 16 January 2023.

=== Other entrants ===
The following players received wildcards into the singles main draw:

- (United States) Dalayna Hewitt
- (United States) Liv Hovde
- (United States) Victoria Hu
- (United States) Maria Mateas

The following players received entry from the qualifying draw:

- (Canada) Kayla Cross
- (Malta) Francesca Curmi
- (United States) Sara Daavettila
- (Czech Republic) Gabriela Knutson
- (Ukraine) Ganna Poznikhirenko
- (Ukraine) Yulia Starodubtseva
- (Denmark) Johanne Svendsen
- (United States) Vivian Wolff
