= 2021 Georgia's Rome Tennis Open =

Tennis tournament

- Date: 25–31 January 2021
- Edition: 1st
- Category: ITF Women's World Tennis Tour
- Prize money: $60,000
- Surface: Hard
- Location: Rome, Georgia, United States

Champions

Singles
- (Spain) Irene Burillo Escorihuela

Doubles
- (United States) Emina Bektas / (United Kingdom) Tara Moore
Georgia's Rome Tennis Open	· 2022 →

The 2021 Georgia's Rome Tennis Open was a professional women's tennis tournament played on outdoor hard courts. It was the first edition of the tournament which was part of the 2021 ITF Women's World Tennis Tour. It took place in Rome, Georgia, United States between 25 and 31 January 2021.

== Singles main-draw entrants ==
=== Seeds ===
Country	Player	Rank^{1}	Seed
BLR	Olga Govortsova	134	1
MEX	Renata Zarazúa	142	2
USA	Francesca Di Lorenzo	143	3
SVK	Kristína Kučová	147	4
USA	Usue Maitane Arconada	155	5
~~USA~~	~~Sachia Vickery~~	~~159~~	~~6~~
PAR	Verónica Cepede Royg	175	7
COL	Camila Osorio	186	8

- ^{1} Rankings are as of 18 January 2021.

=== Other entrants ===
The following players received wildcards into the singles main draw:

- (United States) Hanna Chang
- (United States) Ashlyn Krueger
- (United States) Alycia Parks
- (United States) Katrina Scott

The following player received entry using a protected ranking:

- (United Kingdom) Katie Swan

The following players received entry from the qualifying draw:

- (United States) Emina Bektas
- (Spain) Irene Burillo Escorihuela
- (United States) Sarah Hamner
- (United States) Kimmi Hance
- (United States) Robin Montgomery
- (United Kingdom) Tara Moore
- (Mexico) Ana Sofía Sánchez
- (Hungary) Panna Udvardy

The following player received entry as a lucky loser:

- (United States) Maria Sanchez

== Champions ==
=== Singles ===
- (Spain) Irene Burillo Escorihuela def. (United States) Grace Min, 1–6, 7–6^{(7–4)}, 6–1

=== Doubles ===
- (United States) Emina Bektas / (United Kingdom) Tara Moore def. (Belarus) Olga Govortsova / (Serbia) Jovana Jović, 5–7, 6–2, [10–8]
