= 2022 Georgia's Rome Tennis Open – Singles =

Singles
- 2022 Georgia's Rome Tennis Open

Final
- Champion: (Germany) Tatjana Maria
- Runner-up: (United States) Alycia Parks
- Score: 6–4, 4–6, 6–2

Events
Singles	Doubles
← 2021 ·	Georgia's Rome Tennis Open	· 2023 →

Irene Burillo Escorihuela was the defending champion but lost in the first round to Christina McHale.

Tatjana Maria won the title, defeating Alycia Parks in the final, 6–4, 4–6, 6–2.

== Seeds ==
1. (Mexico) Renata Zarazúa (first round)
2. (Belarus) Olga Govortsova (first round)
3. (China) Wang Xiyu (second round)
4. (China) Yuan Yue (second round)
5. (United States) CoCo Vandeweghe (first round, retired)
6. (Switzerland) Leonie Küng (first round)
7. (United States) Hailey Baptiste (second round)
8. (United States) Grace Min (withdrew)

== Draw ==
=== Key ===
- Q = Qualifier
- WC = Wild card
- LL = Lucky loser
- Alt = Alternate
- SE = Special exempt
- PR = Protected ranking
- ITF = ITF entry
- JE = Junior exempt
- w/o = Walkover
- r = Retired
- d = Defaulted
- SR = Special ranking

=== Finals ===
Semifinals
(United States) Caroline Dolehide	3	6^{4}
WC	(United States) Alycia Parks	6	7^{7}
Q	(Germany) Tatjana Maria	6	6
WC	(United States) Emma Navarro	3	2

Final
WC	(United States) Alycia Parks	4	6	2
Q	(Germany) Tatjana Maria	6	4	6

=== Top half ===
First round
1	(Mexico) R Zarazúa	4	6	4
Q	(Serbia) K Jokić	6	3	6
WC	(United States) R Montgomery	6^{6}	3
WC	(United States) E Bektas	7^{8}	6
(United States) C McHale	2	6	6
(Spain) I Burillo Escorihuela	6	3	4
(United States) C Dolehide	4
5	(United States) C Vandeweghe	0^{r}
4	(China) Y Yuan	7^{8}	6
(Netherlands) A Hartono	6^{6}	1
Q	(United States) D Hewitt	3	6^{4}
WC	(United States) A Parks	6	7^{7}
(Greece) D Papamichail	6^{7}	7^{7}	6
(United Kingdom) J Burrage	7^{9}	6^{3}	0
(United States) F Di Lorenzo	2	7	6
Q	(Switzerland) L Sun	6	5	4

Second round
Q	(Serbia) K Jokić	6	6
WC	(United States) E Bektas	3	4
(United States) C McHale	3	6	3
(United States) C Dolehide	6	3	6
4	(China) Y Yuan	2	3
WC	(United States) A Parks	6	6
(Greece) D Papamichail	1	3
(United States) F Di Lorenzo	6	6

Quarterfinals
Q	(Serbia) K Jokić	6	0	1
(United States) C Dolehide	2	6	6
WC	(United States) A Parks	6	6
(United States) F Di Lorenzo	2	3

Semifinals
(United States) C Dolehide	3	6^{4}
WC	(United States) A Parks	6	7^{7}

=== Bottom half ===
First round
7	(United States) H Baptiste	6	6
(Chinese Taipei) E-s Liang	3	2
Q	(United States) S Chang	6	3	3
(United States) K Volynets	3	6	6
Q	(Germany) T Maria	6	6
(United States) UM Arconada	2	1
(United States) S Vickery	4	6	1
3	(China) Xiy Wang	6	3	6
6	(Switzerland) L Küng	6^{1}	2
LL	(United States) R Kingsley	7^{7}	6
Q	(United States) W Osuigwe	3^{r}
(United States) R Anderson	3
Q	(Mexico) M Zacarías	6	6
Q	(United States) L Chirico	2	2
WC	(United States) E Navarro	6	6
2	(Belarus) O Govortsova	3	1

Second round
7	(United States) H Baptiste	1	2
(United States) K Volynets	6	6
Q	(Germany) T Maria	6	6
3	(China) Xiy Wang	2	1
LL	(United States) R Kingsley	1	6^{2}
(United States) R Anderson	6	7^{7}
Q	(Mexico) M Zacarías	6	1	6^{2}
WC	(United States) E Navarro	4	6	7^{7}

Quarterfinals
(United States) K Volynets	3	3
Q	(Germany) T Maria	6	6
(United States) R Anderson	5	4
WC	(United States) E Navarro	7	6

Semifinals
Q	(Germany) T Maria	6	6
WC	(United States) E Navarro	3	2
