= 2021 Georgia's Rome Tennis Open – Singles =

Singles
- 2021 Georgia's Rome Tennis Open

Final
- Champion: (Spain) Irene Burillo Escorihuela
- Runner-up: (United States) Grace Min
- Score: 1–6, 7–6^{(7–4)}, 6–1

Events
Singles	Doubles
Georgia's Rome Tennis Open	· 2022 →

This is the first edition of the tournament.

Irene Burillo Escorihuela won the title, defeating Grace Min in the final, 1–6, 7–6^{(7–4)}, 6–1.

== Seeds ==
1. (Belarus) Olga Govortsova (second round)
2. (Mexico) Renata Zarazúa (first round)
3. (United States) Francesca Di Lorenzo (first round)
4. (Slovakia) Kristína Kučová (second round)
5. (United States) Usue Maitane Arconada (quarterfinals)
6. (United States) Sachia Vickery (withdrew)
7. (Paraguay) Verónica Cepede Royg (second round)
8. (Colombia) Camila Osorio (second round)

== Draw ==
=== Key ===
- Q = Qualifier
- WC = Wild card
- LL = Lucky loser
- Alt = Alternate
- SE = Special exempt
- PR = Protected ranking
- ITF = ITF entry
- JE = Junior exempt
- w/o = Walkover
- r = Retired
- d = Defaulted
- SR = Special ranking

=== Finals ===
Semifinals
Q	(United States) Emina Bektas	0	3
(United States) Grace Min	6	6
Q	(Spain) Irene Burillo Escorihuela	5	6	7
Q	(Mexico) Ana Sofia Sánchez	7	2	5

Final
(United States) Grace Min	6	6^{4}	1
Q	(Spain) Irene Burillo Escorihuela	1	7^{7}	6

=== Top half ===
First round
1	(Belarus) O Govortsova	4	6	6
WC	(United States) K Scott	6	3	4
(United States) C Harrison	0	2
Q	(United States) E Bektas	6	6
WC	(United States) A Parks	6	6
WC	(United States) H Chang	3	2
(Canada) K Sebov	6	7
LL	(United States) M Sanchez	4	5
4	(Slovakia) K Kučová	6	3	7
Q	(Hungary) P Udvardy	1	6	5
(United States) G Min	6	6
(United States) R Anderson	4	3
WC	(United States) A Krueger	6	6
Q	(United States) K Hance	2	1
PR	(United Kingdom) K Swan	6	3	3
5	(United States) UM Arconada	3	6	6

Second round
1	(Belarus) O Govortsova	6	6^{6}	1
Q	(United States) E Bektas	3	7^{8}	6
WC	(United States) A Parks	1	3
(Canada) K Sebov	6	6
4	(Slovakia) K Kučová	3	4
(United States) G Min	6	6
WC	(United States) A Krueger	4	3
5	(United States) UM Arconada	6	6

Quarterfinals
Q	(United States) E Bektas	7	6
(Canada) K Sebov	5	3
(United States) G Min	6	7^{7}
5	(United States) UM Arconada	3	6^{5}

Semifinals
Q	(United States) E Bektas	0	3
(United States) G Min	6	6

=== Bottom half ===
First round
8	(Colombia) C Osorio	7	6
(Serbia) J Jović	5	4
Q	(United Kingdom) T Moore	3	0
Q	(United States) R Montgomery	6	6
Q	(Spain) I Burillo Escorihuela	3	6	6
(Germany) K Gerlach	6	2	1
(Greece) D Papamichail	6	6
3	(United States) F Di Lorenzo	3	1
7	(Paraguay) V Cepede Royg	6	6
(United States) H Baptiste	2	3
(Switzerland) C Perrin	6^{6}	6	6
Q	(United States) S Hamner	7^{8}	1	2
(United States) C Liu	6	1	2
Q	(Mexico) AS Sánchez	3	6	6
(Romania) G Talabă	7^{7}	6
2	(Mexico) R Zarazúa	6^{4}	1

Second round
8	(Colombia) C Osorio	4	3
Q	(United States) R Montgomery	6	6
Q	(Spain) I Burillo Escorihuela	6	6
(Greece) D Papamichail	2	1
7	(Paraguay) V Cepede Royg	3	6	4
(Switzerland) C Perrin	6	4	6
Q	(Mexico) AS Sánchez	6	7
(Romania) G Talabă	4	5

Quarterfinals
Q	(United States) R Montgomery	6	3	3
Q	(Spain) I Burillo Escorihuela	3	6	6
(Switzerland) C Perrin	0	1
Q	(Mexico) AS Sánchez	6	6

Semifinals
Q	(Spain) I Burillo Escorihuela	5	6	7
Q	(Mexico) AS Sánchez	7	2	5
