= 2023 Georgia's Rome Tennis Open – Doubles =

Doubles
- 2023 Georgia's Rome Tennis Open

Final
- Champions: (Hungary) Fanny Stollár (Switzerland) Lulu Sun
- Runners-up: (Japan) Mana Ayukawa (Czech Republic) Gabriela Knutson
- Score: 6–3, 6–0

Events
Singles	Doubles
← 2022 ·	Georgia's Rome Tennis Open	· 2023 →

Sophie Chang and Angela Kulikov were the defending champions but Kulikov chose not to participate. Chang partnered alongside Kayla Day, but lost to Beatrice Gumulya and Hsieh Yu-chieh in the quarterfinals.

Fanny Stollár and Lulu Sun won the title, defeating Mana Ayukawa and Gabriela Knutson in the final, 6–3, 6–0.

== Seeds ==
1. (Netherlands) Arianne Hartono / (Netherlands) Eva Vedder (first round)
2. (Indonesia) Beatrice Gumulya / (Chinese Taipei) Hsieh Yu-chieh (semifinals)
3. (United States) Francesca Di Lorenzo / (Mexico) Marcela Zacarías (first round)
4. (Spain) Irene Burillo Escorihuela / (Spain) Andrea Lázaro García (first round)

== Draw ==
=== Key ===
- Q = Qualifier
- WC = Wild card
- LL = Lucky loser
- Alt = Alternate
- SE = Special exempt
- PR = Protected ranking
- ITF = ITF entry
- JE = Junior exempt
- w/o = Walkover
- r = Retired
- d = Defaulted
- SR = Special ranking

First round
1	(Netherlands) A Hartono (Netherlands) E Vedder	3	3
M Kozyreva (United States) A Lahey	6	6
(United States) R Anderson (United States) M Mateas	6	6
WC	(United States) S Daavettila; M Kononova	4	4
4	(Spain) I Burillo Escorihuela (Spain) A Lázaro García	3	7	[8]
(Croatia) P Marčinko (Denmark) J Svendsen	6	5	[10]
(United States) A Zamarripa (United States) M Zamarripa	1	2
(Japan) M Ayukawa (Czech Republic) G Knutson	6	6
WC	(Canada) K Cross (United States) K Hui	3	5
(Hungary) F Stollár (Switzerland) L Sun	6	7
(United States) D Hewitt (Serbia) K Jokić	6	7^{7}
3	(United States) F Di Lorenzo (Mexico) M Zacarías	4	6^{3}
(United States) S Chang (United States) K Day	6	6
(Japan) H Arakawa (Japan) N Arakawa	0	0
WC	(United States) G Price (United States) K Shaffer	4	4
2	(Indonesia) B Gumulya (Chinese Taipei) Y-c Hsieh	6	6

Quarterfinals
M Kozyreva (United States) A Lahey	w/o
(United States) R Anderson (United States) M Mateas
(Croatia) P Marčinko (Denmark) J Svendsen	4	2
(Japan) M Ayukawa (Czech Republic) G Knutson	6	6
(Hungary) F Stollár (Switzerland) L Sun	7^{7}	7^{7}
(United States) D Hewitt (Serbia) K Jokić	6^{1}	6^{5}
(United States) S Chang (United States) K Day	7	4	[8]
2	(Indonesia) B Gumulya (Chinese Taipei) Y-c Hsieh	5	6	[10]

Semifinals
M Kozyreva (United States) A Lahey	5	5
(Japan) M Ayukawa (Czech Republic) G Knutson	7	7
(Hungary) F Stollár (Switzerland) L Sun	7	6
2	(Indonesia) B Gumulya (Chinese Taipei) Y-c Hsieh	5	3

Final
(Japan) M Ayukawa (Czech Republic) G Knutson	3	0
(Hungary) F Stollár (Switzerland) L Sun	6	6
