= 2022 Georgia's Rome Tennis Open – Doubles =

Doubles
- 2022 Georgia's Rome Tennis Open

Final
- Champions: (United States) Sophie Chang (United States) Angela Kulikov
- Runners-up: (United States) Emina Bektas (United Kingdom) Tara Moore
- Score: 6–3, 6–7^{(2–7)}, [10–7]

Events
Singles	Doubles
← 2021 ·	Georgia's Rome Tennis Open	· 2023 →

Emina Bektas and Tara Moore were the defending champions but were defeated by Sophie Chang and Angela Kulikov in the final, 6–3, 6–7^{(2–7)}, [10–7].

== Seeds ==
1. (United States) Emina Bektas / (United Kingdom) Tara Moore (final)
2. (United States) Quinn Gleason / (Netherlands) Arianne Hartono (quarterfinals)
3. (Switzerland) Conny Perrin / (Mexico) Marcela Zacarías (first round)
4. (United States) Usue Maitane Arconada / (Belarus) Olga Govortsova (quarterfinals, withdrew)

== Draw ==
=== Key ===
- Q = Qualifier
- WC = Wild card
- LL = Lucky loser
- Alt = Alternate
- SE = Special exempt
- PR = Protected ranking
- ITF = ITF entry
- JE = Junior exempt
- w/o = Walkover
- r = Retired
- d = Defaulted
- SR = Special ranking

=== Draw ===
First round
(United States) H Baptiste (United States) W Osuigwe
(Chinese Taipei) E-s Liang (China) Y Yuan	w/o
4	(United States) UM Arconada (Belarus) O Govortsova	6	6
(Chinese Taipei) Y-c Hsieh (Chinese Taipei) C-y Hsu	2	2
(Spain) I Burillo Escorihuela (Greece) D Papamichail	7	3	[7]
(United States) R Brantmeier (United States) E Kalieva	5	6	[10]
(United States) A Parks (United States) S Vickery	6^{3}	6	[11]
(United States) F Di Lorenzo (United States) C McHale	7^{7}	4	[9]
(United States) A Krueger (United States) R Montgomery	6	6
3	(Switzerland) C Perrin (Mexico) M Zacarías	2	2
(France) M Partaud (Mexico) MJ Portillo Ramírez	2	6^{5}
(United States) S Chang (United States) A Kulikov	6	7^{7}

Quarterfinals
1	(United States) E Bektas (United Kingdom) T Moore	6	6
(Chinese Taipei) E-s Liang (China) Y Yuan	2	1
4	(United States) UM Arconada (Belarus) O Govortsova
(United States) R Brantmeier (United States) E Kalieva	w/o
(United States) A Parks (United States) S Vickery	6	6
(United States) A Krueger (United States) R Montgomery	4	2
(United States) S Chang (United States) A Kulikov	6	6
2	(United States) Q Gleason (Netherlands) A Hartono	0	2

Semifinals
1	(United States) E Bektas (United Kingdom) T Moore	7	7
(United States) R Brantmeier (United States) E Kalieva	5	5
(United States) A Parks (United States) S Vickery	2	6^{1}
(United States) S Chang (United States) A Kulikov	6	7^{7}

Final
1	(United States) E Bektas (United Kingdom) T Moore	3	7^{7}	[7]
(United States) S Chang (United States) A Kulikov	6	6^{2}	[10]
