= 2023 Georgia's Rome Tennis Open – Singles =

Singles
- 2023 Georgia's Rome Tennis Open

Final
- Champion: (United States) Peyton Stearns
- Runner-up: (Czech Republic) Gabriela Knutson
- Score: 3–6, 6–0, 6–2

Events
Singles	Doubles
← 2022 ·	Georgia's Rome Tennis Open	· 2023 →

Tatjana Maria was the defending champion but chose not to participate.

Peyton Stearns won the title, defeating Gabriela Knutson in the final, 3–6, 6–0, 6–2.

== Seeds ==
1. (Hungary) Panna Udvardy (first round)
2. (United States) Elizabeth Mandlik (first round)
3. (United States) Ann Li (second round)
4. (United States) Ashlyn Krueger (second round)
5. (Croatia) Petra Marčinko (second round)
6. (United States) Robin Anderson (second round)
7. (United States) Kayla Day (first round)
8. (Mexico) Marcela Zacarías (quarterfinals)

== Draw ==
=== Key ===
- Q = Qualifier
- WC = Wild card
- LL = Lucky loser
- Alt = Alternate
- SE = Special exempt
- PR = Protected ranking
- ITF = ITF entry
- JE = Junior exempt
- w/o = Walkover
- r = Retired
- d = Defaulted
- SR = Special ranking

=== Finals ===
Semifinals
(United States) Peyton Stearns	7^{7}	6
(Switzerland) Lulu Sun	6^{3}	3
Q	(Czech Republic) Gabriela Knutson	5	6	6
(United States) Francesca Di Lorenzo	7	2	1

Final
(United States) Peyton Stearns	3	6	6
Q	(Czech Republic) Gabriela Knutson	6	0	2

=== Top half ===
First round
1	(Hungary) P Udvardy	6	3	2
WC	(United States) L Hovde	3	6	6
Q	(Denmark) J Svendsen	6	6
Q	(United States) V Wolff	3	1
(Netherlands) E Vedder	4	3
(United States) P Stearns	6	6
(United States) D Lao	7^{7}	4	2
6	(United States) R Anderson	6^{4}	6	6
3	(United States) A Li	6	6^{8}	6
WC	(United States) D Hewitt	3	7^{10}	0
(Switzerland) L Sun	6	6
Q	(Canada) K Cross	4	0
WC	(United States) M Mateas	7^{7}	6^{4}	2
(Spain) A Lázaro García	6^{2}	7^{7}	6
Q	(Ukraine) G Poznikhirenko	2	0^{r}
5	(Croatia) P Marčinko	6	2

Second round
WC	(United States) L Hovde	6^{4}	4
Q	(Denmark) J Svendsen	7^{7}	6
(United States) P Stearns	5	7	7
6	(United States) R Anderson	7	5	5
3	(United States) A Li	4	6	4
(Switzerland) L Sun	6	3	6
(Spain) A Lázaro García	4	7	6
5	(Croatia) P Marčinko	6	5	3

Quarterfinals
Q	(Denmark) J Svendsen	3	2
(United States) P Stearns	6	6
(Switzerland) L Sun	6	6
(Spain) A Lázaro García	4	2

Semifinals
(United States) P Stearns	7^{7}	6
(Switzerland) L Sun	6^{3}	3

=== Bottom half ===
First round
7	(United States) K Day	6^{3}	6^{1}
(United States) R Montgomery	7^{7}	7^{7}
(Spain) I Burillo Escorihuela	4	6	2
(United States) A Lahey	6	4	6
Q	(Ukraine) Y Starodubtseva	5	6^{6}
Q	(Czech Republic) G Knutson	7	7^{8}
WC	(United States) V Hu	1	0^{r}
4	(United States) A Krueger	6	0
8	(Mexico) M Zacarías	6	6
(Netherlands) A Hartono	4	1
Q	(United States) S Daavettila	7	4	6
Q	(Malta) F Curmi	5	6	4
(United States) H Inoue	6	6
(United States) S Chang	3	4
(United States) F Di Lorenzo	7^{7}	7^{7}
2	(United States) E Mandlik	6^{3}	6^{5}

Second round
(United States) R Montgomery	3	6	3
(United States) A Lahey	6	1	6
Q	(Czech Republic) G Knutson	6	7
4	(United States) A Krueger	2	5
8	(Mexico) M Zacarías	6	7
Q	(United States) S Daavettila	2	5
(United States) H Inoue	2	3
(United States) F Di Lorenzo	6	6

Quarterfinals
(United States) A Lahey	4	6	2
Q	(Czech Republic) G Knutson	6	4	6
8	(Mexico) M Zacarías	4	6	2
(United States) F Di Lorenzo	6	1	6

Semifinals
Q	(Czech Republic) G Knutson	5	6	6
(United States) F Di Lorenzo	7	2	1
