= 2021 Georgia's Rome Tennis Open – Doubles =

2021 Tennis Tournament

Doubles
- 2021 Georgia's Rome Tennis Open

Final
- Champions: (United States) Emina Bektas (United Kingdom) Tara Moore
- Runners-up: (Belarus) Olga Govortsova (Serbia) Jovana Jović
- Score: 5–7, 6–2, [10–8]

Events
Singles	Doubles
Georgia's Rome Tennis Open	· 2022 →

This was the first edition of the tournament.

Emina Bektas and Tara Moore won the title, defeating Olga Govortsova and Jovana Jović in the final, 5–7, 6–2, [10–8].

== Seeds ==
1. (United States) Quinn Gleason / (United States) Ingrid Neel (quarterfinals)
2. (United States) Robin Anderson / (New Zealand) Erin Routliffe (first round)
3. (United States) Usue Maitane Arconada / (Switzerland) Conny Perrin (first round)
4. (Russia) Amina Anshba / (Venezuela) Andrea Gámiz (first round)

== Draw ==
=== Key ===
- Q = Qualifier
- WC = Wild card
- LL = Lucky loser
- Alt = Alternate
- SE = Special exempt
- PR = Protected ranking
- ITF = ITF entry
- JE = Junior exempt
- w/o = Walkover
- r = Retired
- d = Defaulted
- SR = Special ranking

=== Draw ===
First round
1	(United States) Q Gleason (United States) I Neel	6	6
(United States) R McAdoo (United States) A Parks	2	2
(United States) A Zamarripa (United States) M Zamarripa	7	3	[16]
(United States) C Harrison (United States) S Whittle	5	6	[18]
3	(United States) UM Arconada (Switzerland) C Perrin	2	2
(United States) F Di Lorenzo (United States) M Sanchez	6	6
(United States) H Baptiste (United States) M Mateas	6^{5}	5
(Belarus) O Govortsova (Serbia) J Jović	7^{7}	7
WC	(United States) S Hamner (United States) A Krueger	6	3	[8]
(Romania) G Talabă (Mexico) R Zarazúa	4	6	[10]
(Greece) D Papamichail (United Kingdom) K Swan	6	6^{5}	[10]
4	(Russia) A Anshba (Venezuela) A Gámiz	0	7^{7}	[8]
(Japan) A Okuno (United States) S Vickery	3	2
(Colombia) C Osorio (Mexico) AS Sánchez	6	6
(United States) E Bektas (United Kingdom) T Moore	6	6
2	(United States) R Anderson (New Zealand) E Routliffe	3	4

Quarterfinals
1	(United States) Q Gleason (United States) I Neel	0	6^{6}
(United States) C Harrison (United States) S Whittle	6	7^{8}
(United States) F Di Lorenzo (United States) M Sanchez	6^{4}	4
(Belarus) O Govortsova (Serbia) J Jović	7^{7}	6
(Romania) G Talabă (Mexico) R Zarazúa	6^{3}	4
(Greece) D Papamichail (United Kingdom) K Swan	7^{7}	6
(Colombia) C Osorio (Mexico) AS Sánchez
(United States) E Bektas (United Kingdom) T Moore	w/o

Semifinals
(United States) C Harrison (United States) S Whittle	2	6	[10]
(Belarus) O Govortsova (Serbia) J Jović	6	2	[12]
(Greece) D Papamichail (United Kingdom) K Swan	4	2
(United States) E Bektas (United Kingdom) T Moore	6	6

Final
(Belarus) O Govortsova (Serbia) J Jović	7	2	[8]
(United States) E Bektas (United Kingdom) T Moore	5	6	[10]
