= Mana Ayukawa =

Japanese tennis player (born 1994)

Mana Ayukawa 鮎川 真奈
- Country (sports): Japan
- Born: 14 September 1994 (age 31) Noda, Japan
- Plays: Right (two-handed backhand)
- Prize money: $132,328

Singles
- Career record: 259–259
- Career titles: 2 ITF
- Highest ranking: No. 382 (29 July 2019)

Doubles
- Career record: 295–219
- Career titles: 19 ITF
- Highest ranking: No. 190 (4 May 2026)
- Current ranking: No. 194 (18 May 2026)
- Last updated on: 22 May 2026.

Mana Ayukawa (鮎川 真奈, Ayukawa Mana ; born 14 September 1994) is a Japanese tennis player.

Ayukawa has a career-high singles ranking by the WTA of 382, achieved on 29 July 2019, and a best doubles ranking of world No. 190, achieved on 4 May 2026. She has won two singles titles and 19 doubles titles on the ITF Circuit.

== Early life ==
She was born Noda in Japan. Started playing tennis at the age of three. She started playing professional tennis in 2012.

== Career ==
=== Juniors ===
As a junior, Ayukawa reached her highest ranking of 174 on 31 January 2011.

=== Professional ===
In October 2018, she played in the finals of the W25 tournament held in Hamamatsu, Japan.

In February 2022, she won her second career singles title at a W15 tournament in Monastir, Tunisia. In May 2022, She won the ITF W25 tournament in Nottingham, United Kingdom, with her Australian partner Alana Parnaby. This was Ayukawa's seventeenth title on the ITF Tour.

In February 2023, she reached the final of the Georgia's Rome Tennis Open, a W60 tournament held in Rome, United States, with her Czech partner Gabriela Knutson. They lost in two sets to Hungarian Fanny Stollár and Swiss Lulu Sun.

In September 2025, she won the ITF W35 tournament held in Nakhon Pathom, Thailand, with her compatriot Eri Shimizu, beating her compatriots Natsumi Kawaguchi and Erika Sema in the final.

=== 2025: WTA Tour debut ===
Ayukawa WTA Tour main-draw debut at the 2025 Jiangxi Open, in the doubles tournament, partnering with Kanako Morisaki. In the first round defeating English Alicia Barnett and French Elixane Lechemia they advanced to the quarterfinals. They advanced to the semifinals by defeating Isabelle Haverlag of the Netherlands and Maia Lumsden of Great Britain in the quarterfinals.

== ITF Circuit finals ==
=== Singles: 6 (2 titles, 4 runner-ups) ===
Legend
W25 tournaments
W10/15 tournaments

Result	W–L	Date	Tournament	Tier	Surface	Opponent	Score
Loss	0–1	Feb 2012	ITF Antalya, Turkey	W10	Clay	(Romania) Andreea Mitu	3–6, 0–6
Loss	0–2	Mar 2014	ITF Kōfu, Japan	W10	Hard	(Japan) Chiaki Okadaue	6–3, 6–7^{(7)}, 2–6
Win	1–2	Jun 2014	ITF Tokyo, Japan	W10	Hard	(Japan) Miyabi Inoue	2–6, 6–0, 6–3
Loss	1–3	May 2018	ITF Hammamet, Tunisia	W15	Clay	(Slovenia) Pia Čuk	3–6, 5–7
Loss	1–4	Oct 2018	ITF Hamamatsu, Japan	W25	Carpet	(Japan) Ayano Shimizu	3–6, 4–6
Win	2–4	Feb 2022	ITF Monastir, Tunisia	W15	Hard	(Slovakia) Radka Zelníčková	1–6, 6–1, 6–4

=== Doubles: 48 (19 titles, 29 runner-ups) ===
Legend W60 tournaments (0–2) W50 tournaments W25/35 tournaments (7–15) W10/15 tournaments (12–12)	Finals by surface Hard (12–20) Clay (5–3) Grass (2–3) Carpet (0–3)

Result	W–L	Date	Tournament	Tier	Surface	Partner	Opponents	Score
Win	1–0	Jun 2013	ITF Istanbul, Turkey	W10	Hard	(Japan) Tomoko Dokei	(Australia) Nicole Hoyanski (Australia) Abbie Myers	6–4, 7–6^{(6)}
Win	2–0	Jul 2013	ITF Knokke, Belgium	W10	Clay	(Netherlands) Monique Zuur	(Belgium) Elke Lemmens (Belgium) Sofie Oyen	6–2, 4–6, [10–8]
Loss	2–1	Sep 2013	ITF Kyoto, Japan	W10	Carpet (i)	(Japan) Emi Mutaguchi	(Japan) Miyu Kato (Japan) Hiroko Kuwata	4–6, 2–6
Win	3–1	Mar 2014	ITF Antalya, Turkey	W10	Clay	(France) Estelle Cascino	(Slovakia) Lenka Juríková (Austria) Janina Toljan	7–5, 7–5
Win	4–1	Apr 2014	ITF Pula, Italy	W10	Clay	(Latvia) Jeļena Ostapenko	(Italy) Alice Balducci (Romania) Diana Enache	7–5, 3–6, [10–5]
Win	5–1	Jun 2014	ITF Tokyo, Japan	W10	Hard	(Japan) Makoto Ninomiya	(Japan) Yurina Koshino (Japan) Akiko Omae	3–6, 6–4, [10–4]
Loss	5–2	Jul 2014	Challenger de Gatineau, Canada	W25	Hard	(Poland) Justyna Jegiołka	(Japan) Hiroko Kuwata (Japan) Chiaki Okadaue	4–6, 3–6
Win	6–2	Jan 2015	ITF Hong Kong	W10	Hard	(Japan) Makoto Ninomiya	(China) Tang Haochen (China) Ye Qiuyu	7–6^{(4)}, 2–6, [10–7]
Loss	6–3	Feb 2015	ITF Clare, Australia	W15	Hard	(Japan) Kotomi Takahata	(Australia) Jessica Moore (United States) Jennifer Elie	3–6, 5–7
Loss	6–4	Mar 2015	ITF Mornington, Australia	W15	Clay	(Japan) Ayaka Okuno	(Australia) Priscilla Hon (Australia) Tammi Patterson	4–6, 6–7^{(4)}
Loss	6–5	May 2015	ITF Karuizawa, Japan	W25	Grass	(Japan) Makoto Ninomiya	(Japan) Rika Fujiwara (Japan) Miyu Kato	2–6, 0–6
Loss	6–6	May 2015	ITF Changwon, South Korea	W25	Hard (i)	(Japan) Makoto Ninomiya	(South Korea) Han Na-lae (South Korea) Yoo Mi	3–6, 1–6
Loss	6–7	Jun 2015	ITF Kashiwa, Japan	W25	Hard	(Japan) Makoto Ninomiya	(Japan) Miyu Kato (Japan) Akiko Omae	2–6, 7–5, [8–10]
Win	7–7	Aug 2015	ITF Braunschweig, Germany	W15	Clay	(Italy) Gaia Sanesi	(Germany) Shaline-Doreen Pipa (Germany) Anastazja Rosnowska	3–6, 7–6^{(5)}, [10–4]
Loss	7–8	Sep 2015	ITF Bangkok, Thailand	W15	Hard	(Japan) Yuuki Tanaka	(Japan) Hiroko Kuwata (Japan) Ayaka Okuno	6–2, 1–6, [6–10]
Win	8–8	Oct 2015	ITF Hamamatsu, Japan	W25	Grass	(Japan) Makoto Ninomiya	(Japan) Kanae Hisami (Japan) Kotomi Takahata	0–6, 6–3, [10–4]
Loss	8–9	Dec 2015	ITF Hong Kong, China SAR	W10	Hard	(Japan) Haruka Kaji	(Finland) Emma Laine (Japan) Yukina Saigo	w/o
Loss	8–10	Mar 2016	ITF Mildura, Australia	W25	Grass	(Japan) Yuuki Tanaka	(Australia) Olivia Tjandramulia (United States) Jessica Wacnik	0–6, 3–6
Loss	8–11	May 2016	ITF Karuizawa, Japan	W25	Grass	(Japan) Mana Ayukawa	(Japan) Rika Fujiwara (Japan) Kotomi Takahata	1–6, 4–6
Loss	8–12	Aug 2016	Challenger de Gatineau, Canada	W25	Hard	(United Kingdom) Samantha Murray Sharan	(Canada) Bianca Andreescu (Canada) Charlotte Robillard-Millette	6–4, 4–6, [6–10]
Loss	8–13	May 2017	Jin'an Open, China	W60	Hard	(Japan) Erika Sema	(China) Jiang Xinyu (China) Tang Qianhui	5–7, 4–6
Win	9–13	Nov 2017	ITF Heraklion, Greece	W15	Clay	(Switzerland) Ylena In-Albon	(Germany) Franziska Kommer (Germany) Laura Schaeder	6–4, 6–3
Win	10–13	Nov 2017	ITF Stellenbosch, South Africa	W15	Hard	(South Africa) Chanel Simmonds	(United Kingdom) Alicia Barnett (Switzerland) Nina Stadler	6–2, 6–2
Win	11–13	Dec 2017	ITF Stellenbosch, South Africa	W15	Hard	(South Africa) Chanel Simmonds	(Canada) Petra Januskova (United States) Madeleine Kobelt	7–6^{(3)}, 6–3
Loss	11–14	Feb 2028	ITF Antalya, Turkey	W15	Hard	(Switzerland) Nina Stadler	(Cyprus) Raluca Șerban (Romania) Oana Georgeta Simion	2–6, 6–7^{(5)}
Loss	11–15	Apr 2028	ITF Hammamet, Tunisia	W15	Hard	(Switzerland) Nina Stadler	(Romania) Oana Gavrilă (Russia) Maria Marfutina	2–6, 2–6
Loss	11–16	May 2018	ITF Hammamet, Tunisia	W15	Clay	(Spain) Alicia Herrero Liñana	(Romania) Cristina Adamescu (Romania) Ioana Loredana Roșca	4–6, 3–6
Loss	11–17	Jun 2018	ITF Hua Hin, Thailand	W25	Hard	(Switzerland) Nina Stadler	(Mexico) Victoria Rodríguez (New Zealand) Erin Routliffe	4–6, 4–6
Loss	11–18	Jul 2018	ITF Jakarta, Indonesia	W15	Hard	(India) Zeel Desai	(Netherlands) Arianne Hartono (Indonesia) Aldila Sutjiadi	1–6, 2–6
Win	12–18	Feb 2019	ITF Jodhpur, India	W25	Hard	(Japan) Haruka Kaji	(Japan) Eri Hozumi (Japan) Miyabi Inoue	7–6^{(4)}, 4–6, [10–5]
Win	13–18	Jul 2019	ITF Qujing, China	W25	Hard	(Japan) Erika Sema	(China) Kang Jiaqi (Thailand) Peangtarn Plipuech	6–2, 6–3
Win	14–18	Aug 2019	ITF Tsukuba, Japan	W25	Hard	(Japan) Erika Sema	(Japan) Robu Kajitani (Japan) Michika Ozeki	6–7^{(2)}, 6–1, [10–7]
Win	15–18	Jan 2020	ITF Hong Kong, China SAR	W25	Hard	(Hong Kong) Eudice Chong	(Japan) Momoko Kobori (Japan) Mei Yamaguchi	6–4, 6–3
Loss	15–19	Mar 2021	ITF Sharm El Sheikh, Egypt	W15	Hard	(Japan) Ayano Shimizu	(Japan) Erika Sema (Czech Republic) Anna Sisková	6–1, 4–6, 1–2 ret.
Loss	15–20	Jun 2021	Open Arcadis Osuna, Spain	W25	Hard	(South Korea) Han Na-lae	(Australia) Destanee Aiava (Australia) Olivia Gadecki	3–6, 3–6
Loss	15–21	Jun 2021	Porto Open, Portugal	W25	Hard	(Japan) Akiko Omae	(Netherlands) Arianne Hartono (United Kingdom) Lily Miyazaki	5–7, 2–6
Loss	15–22	Oct 2021	ITF Monastir, Tunisia	W15	Hard	(Austria) Tamira Paszek	(Japan) Natsuho Arakawa (Thailand) Luksika Kumkhum	4–6, 2–6
Win	16–22	Oct 2021	ITF Monastir, Tunisia	W15	Hard	(Hungary) Rebeka Stolmár	(China) Ma Yexin (China) Zhuoma Ni Ma	6–3, 6–4
Win	17–22	May 2022	ITF Nottingham, United Kingdom	W25	Grass	(Australia) Alana Parnaby	(Hong Kong) Eudice Chong (Hong Kong) Cody Wong	7–5, 6–4
Loss	17–23	Oct 2022	ITF Makinohara, Japan	W25	Carpet	(Japan) Riko Sawayanagi	(Japan) Mayuka Aikawa (Japan) Momoko Kobori	4–6, 5–7, [7–10]
Loss	17–24	Feb 2023	Georgia's Rome Open, United States	W60	Hard (i)	(Czech Republic) Gabriela Knutson	(Hungary) Fanny Stollár (Switzerland) Lulu Sun	3–6, 0–6
Loss	17–25	Feb 2024	ITF Sharm El Sheikh, Egypt	W15	Hard	(Romania) Briana Szabó	(Romania) Karola Bejenaru (Lithuania) Andrė Lukošiūtė	4–6, 3–6
Loss	17–26	Jul 2024	ITF Tianjin, China	W35	Hard	(Japan) Mana Kawamura	(China) Huang Yujia (China) Zheng Wushuang	3–6, 3–6
Win	18–26	Jul 2024	ITF Sapporo, Japan	W15	Hard	(Japan) Mao Mushika	(South Korea) Jeong Bo-young (Hong Kong) Cody Wong	6–3, 6–4
Loss	18–27	Oct 2024	ITF Bakersfield, United States	W35	Hard	(China) Huang Yujia	(United States) Eryn Cayetano (United States) India Houghton	6–7^{(8)}, 2–6
Loss	18–28	Jul 2025	ITF Buzău, Romania	W35	Clay	(Romania) Briana Szabó	(Romania) Elena Ruxandra Bertea (Russia) Daria Lodikova	6–7^{(7)}, 1–6
Win	19–28	Sep 2025	ITF Nakhon Pathom, Thailand	W35	Hard	(Japan) Eri Shimizu	(Japan) Natsumi Kawaguchi (Japan) Erika Sema	6–2, 6–7^{(5)}, [10–8]
Loss	19–29	Nov 2025	ITF Hamamatsu, Japan	W35	Carpet	(Japan) Kanako Morisaki	(Japan) Hikaru Sato (Japan) Eri Shimizu	3–6, 2–6
