= Georgia's Rome Tennis Open =

- 2023 Georgia's Rome Tennis Open 2

ITF Women's Tour
- Event name: Georgia's Rome Tennis Open
- Location: Rome, Georgia, United States
- Venue: Rome Tennis Center at Berry College
- Category: ITF Women's World Tennis Tour
- Surface: Hard indoor
- Draw: 32S/32Q/16D
- Prize money: $60,000

The Georgia's Rome Tennis Open is a tournament for professional tennis players on the ITF Women's World Tennis Tour played on indoor hardcourts. It is classified as a $60,000 event and has been held in Rome, Georgia, since 2021.

== Past finals ==
=== Singles ===
Year	Champion	Runner-up	Score
2026	(United States) Ayana Akli	(United States) Amelia Honer	7–6^{(7–3)}, 6–4
2025	(Canada) Victoria Mboko	(Netherlands) Eva Vedder	7–5, 6–3
2024	(United States) McCartney Kessler	(United States) Liv Hovde	6–4, 6–1
2023 (2)	(United States) McCartney Kessler	(United States) Grace Min	6–2, 6–1
2023 (1)	(United States) Peyton Stearns	(Czech Republic) Gabriela Knutson	3–6, 6–0, 6–2
2022	(Germany) Tatjana Maria	(United States) Alycia Parks	6–4, 4–6, 6–2
2021	(Spain) Irene Burillo Escorihuela	(United States) Grace Min	1–6, 7–6^{(7–4)}, 6–1

=== Doubles ===
Year	Champions	Runners-up	Score
2026	(United States) Jaeda Daniel (Australia) Lily Fairclough	(United States) Savannah Broadus (United States) Kylie Collins	7–5, 6–4
2025	(United States) Sophie Chang (United States) Angela Kulikov	(United States) Whitney Osuigwe (Netherlands) Eva Vedder	7–6^{(7–3)}, 6–4
2024	(United States) Angela Kulikov (United States) Jamie Loeb	(United States) Hailey Baptiste (United States) Whitney Osuigwe	walkover
2023 (2)	(United States) Sofia Sewing; Anastasia Tikhonova	(United States) Robin Anderson (Mexico) Fernanda Contreras	4–6, 6–3, [10–7]
2023 (1)	(Hungary) Fanny Stollár (Switzerland) Lulu Sun	(Japan) Mana Ayukawa (Czech Republic) Gabriela Knutson	6–3, 6–0
2022	(United States) Sophie Chang (United States) Angela Kulikov	(United States) Emina Bektas (United Kingdom) Tara Moore	6–3, 6–7^{(2–7)}, [10–7]
2021	(United States) Emina Bektas (United Kingdom) Tara Moore	(Belarus) Olga Govortsova (Serbia) Jovana Jović	5–7, 6–2, [10–8]
