= Tara Moore =

British tennis player (born 1992)

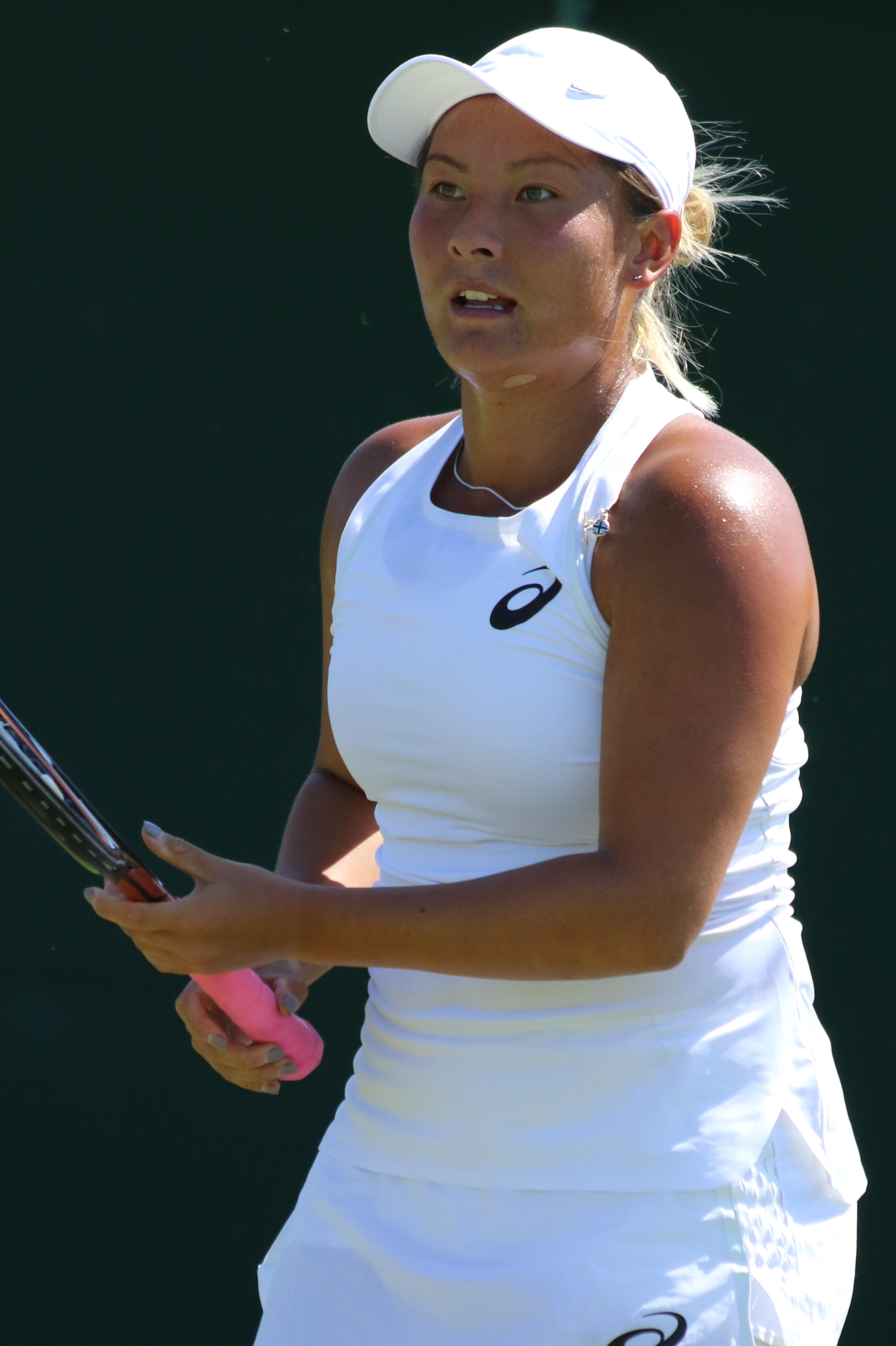
- Moore during 2018 Wimbledon qualifying
- Country (sports): United Kingdom
- Residence: Doncaster, England
- Born: 6 August 1992 (age 34) British Hong Kong
- Height: 1.63 m (5 ft 4 in)
- Turned pro: 2010
- Plays: Right (two-handed backhand)
- Coach: Graham McMullen
- Prize money: $657,178

Singles
- Career record: 380–331
- Career titles: 9 ITF
- Highest ranking: No. 145 (8 May 2017)

Grand Slam singles results
- Australian Open: Q1 (2014, 2017)
- French Open: Q1 (2013)
- Wimbledon: 2R (2016)
- US Open: Q2 (2016)

Doubles
- Career record: 279–245
- Career titles: 18 ITF
- Highest ranking: No. 77 (11 July 2022)

Grand Slam doubles results
- Australian Open: 1R (2025)
- French Open: 2R (2022)
- Wimbledon: 1R (2012, 2013, 2014, 2016, 2021, 2024)
- US Open: 2R (2024)

Grand Slam mixed doubles results
- Wimbledon: 3R (2021)

Team competitions
- Fed Cup: Europe/Africa Zone Group I – Play-offs (2014), record 1–1

Tara Shanice Moore (born 6 August 1992) is an inactive Hong Kong-born British tennis player. She achieved career-high rankings by the WTA of 145 in singles and No. 77 in doubles. In her career, she won nine singles titles and 18 doubles titles on the ITF Circuit.

As a junior, she was coached by the American tennis coach, Nick Bollettieri. In September 2006, he referred to Moore as one of the best young players in his school, the Bollettieri Tennis Academy, along with Michelle Larcher de Brito. Her coach was Charles Homewood. Her favourite surface is stated as being grass although most of her titles to date have come on hardcourt.

Moore is currently serving a four-year competition ban set to end in December 2027 for an anti-doping rule violation relating to a failed test in 2022.

== Career ==
=== 2006–2007 ===
Moore's first professional tennis match came in August 2006 at the $10k tournament in Guayaquil, Ecuador. She won two matches to qualify before losing in the first round of the tournament. Moore then moved on to qualify and reach the quarterfinals in only the second ITF tournament of her career in Caracas, Venezuela, another $10k event.

In 2007, Moore reached the quarterfinals of another $10k event in Irapuato before losing to Ana Clara Duarte of Brazil, in straight sets. In July, she entered her first $25k tournament in Felixstowe, England, where she lost in the qualifying stages. Her next two tournaments were both $10k events in England (Ilkley and Wrexham) and she managed to reach the quarterfinal stages of both of these. She ended the year with three consecutive first-round losses at $25k events. Her year-end ranking for 2007 was world No. 823.

=== 2008 ===
April and May resulted in three failures to qualify for ITF tournaments, two of which were $25k events, the other a $50k event. She became a quarterfinalist yet again in her next tournament, the $10k in Izmir, Turkey. She then began a successful grass-court season with a wildcard into the qualifying tournament of Wimbledon where she lost in the first round in a valiant three-set battle against former top-40 player Olga Puchkova of Russia. She followed this up immediately with her first ever semifinal in the $25k tournament held in Felixstowe and continued the momentum in the following tournament ($10k Frinton) where she won, beating fellow teenager Mona Barthel of Germany in the final.

Her next noteworthy result of 2008 came on the ITF Circuit in early November at the $10k event in Sunderland, England. She won through two tough three-set matches in the first and second rounds before winning her quarterfinal match in two sets and coming up against Laura Robson, in one of two all-British semifinals. She lost in straight sets to Robson (who was the eventual champion). Immediately after this was the $10k tournament in Jersey. In the second round of this tournament, she played a rematch of her second-round match in the previous tournament in Sunderland. She beat Tetyana Arefyeva in three sets for the second time in two weeks to reach the quarterfinal stage where she was beaten by Katarzyna Piter. She ended season with a singles ranking of world No. 712.

=== 2009 ===
Moore struggled throughout the year and did not go beyond the quarterfinals in any of the events she competed in. She enjoyed a straight-sets win over former top-20 player Eleni Daniilidou as she qualified for the $50 event in Nottingham. She also competed at the ITF junior events at Roehampton and Wimbledon but lost early in both events as she was drawn against junior world No. 3, Tímea Babos. Post Wimbledon, Moore's best result was qualifying for a $75k event in Shrewsbury before losing to Angelique Kerber. Moore was also asked to leave the Lawn Tennis Association (LTA) National Tennis Centre (NTC) as a result of her perceived lack of professionalism and poor attitude. She would end the year in India before heading back to Hong Kong.

=== 2010 ===
New season started very much as 2009 ended for Moore with early losses in her first handful of events. She was training and working out of Hong Kong, following her expulsion from the LTA although in March, Moore began working with British tennis coach John Morris who was also the coach of Tímea Babos, ranked a lowly 790 on the WTA rankings, Moore moved back to Britain to train at Gosling Tennis Academy under the watchful eye of John Morris. Her results started to pick up in spring time of 2010 as she reached the final of a $10k event in Edinburgh, losing to stable mate Tímea Babos, following this up with her first career top-100 win at the $50k event in Nottingham, beating Chang Kai-chen in three tough sets. During the grass-court season, Moore represented Great Britain in the Maureen Connolly trophy, a sign that the LTA were beginning to see the improvements in Moore both on and off court. This was quickly followed by a wildcard into the ITF junior event at Roehampton where Moore beat world junior No. 1, Daria Gavrilova, 6–0, 6–1, before beating the 2010 Australian Open junior champion, Karolína Plíšková, 6–3, 6–1. But Moore found Karolina's twin sister Kristýna Plíšková too hot to handle as Plíšková achieved a rare double of winning both titles at Roehampton and Wimbledon. On to Wimbledon, Moore had some impressive wins and reached her first Grand Slam quarterfinal where she played fellow Brit Laura Robson and despite controlling much of the match, Moore lost in two sets although she put herself firmly on the tennis map during the grass-court season and credited John Morris for much of the improvements. Post Wimbledon, Moore won her second career title at a $10k event in Chiswick, as well as her first ITF doubles title, alongside Francesca Stephenson, at a $25k in Wrexham, beating Sania Mirza and Emma Laine in the final. She also made the singles quarterfinals in the latter event, with wins over Emilia Baños Gregorians and Manisha Foster. Moore would go on to reach several quarter- and semifinals before ending the year at the $75k event in Dubai. She achieved several career-high rankings through the year and ended 2010 ranked 370. Moore also became a professional in August 2010 when she signed professional terms with London-based management company Global Tennis Connections (GTC), she also signed a long term deal with Adidas International on the back of her upsurge in form and ranking.

=== 2011–2013 ===
Moore was runner-up in the $10k tournament in Sunderland, and won the $10k in Loughborough where she also won the doubles, partnering fellow Brit Francesca Stephenson. She also reached doubles finals in $10k tournaments in Istanbul, partnering Lisa Whybourn, and in Bath, partnering Emma Laine. She ended 2011 with a singles ranking of No. 332.

Moore won no titles in the 2012 season but finished runner-up in singles in the $50k tournament in Kazan, Russia, and in doubles, partnering fellow Brit player Lucy Brown in a $10k event in Antalya, Turkey. However, she improved her ranking throughout the year, and achieved No. 249 in singles.

She started 2013 winning the $10k singles titles in Glasgow and Preston, and following that with the $25k title in Surprise, Arizona. In partnership with compatriot Melanie South, also winning the doubles titles in Glasgow and in the $25k event in Rancho Mirage, California, and ended runner-up in Preston and in Phuket, Thailand.

Moore debuted in top 200 of the singles rankings on 22 April, and made the cut for the Roland Garros qualifying tournament, her first major outside of Wimbledon, where she has played qualifiers courtesy of wildcards. There she lost to seventh seed Sesil Karatancheva, in the first round of qualifying.

On grass in the UK, Moore was awarded a wildcard into the $75k Nottingham Trophy. She reached the second round, beating 143-ranked Slovenian Tadeja Majerič before falling to 110-ranked Hungarian, Melinda Czink. She then received a wildcard into the WTA Tour Birmingham Classic at Edgbaston where she narrowly lost to 12th seeded Kristina Mladenovic in the first round. This followed with a wildcard into Wimbledon in June, where she faced 46-ranked Estonian, Kaia Kanepi, in the first round. Kanepi went on to win in a close three-setter.

Back on the ITF Circuit, Moore reached the finals of both the singles and the doubles tournament of the $25k Woking event on outdoor hardcourt. She lost the singles final to Pemra Özgen in three sets, having held matchpoints. However, she and her Russian partner, Marta Sirotkina, won the doubles, beating Mari Tanaka and Kanae Hisami in the final.

However, in December the LTA cut her funding, citing a lack of results.

=== 2014–2015 ===
In 2014, Moore made her debut for the British Fed Cup team in the ninth/tenth placed playoff against Austria, and won her first singles rubber.

She impressively saw off Tamira Paszek, a former top-30 player. She also played in Wimbledon as a wildcard but lost in the first round to former Wimbledon finalist Vera Zvonareva in a match that spanned two days. Moore failed to build on her Wimbledon performance on her return to ITF Circuit play, as she won just three singles matches in the rest of the year. She saw her ranking slip outside the top 250 in the world as a consequence.

Her poor form continued in 2015. Playing solely at ITF level, Moore's best result was reaching the semifinals of a $10k tournament in Antalya and a $15k event in Loughborough. This was the first year since 2009 that she had failed to make a singles tournament final. She had more success in doubles, reaching three finals and winning the event Antalya in partnership with Cornelia Lister.

=== 2016–2019: First WTA Tour doubles final ===
Moore's 2016 campaign got off to a bright start, as she won her first tournament of the year, a $10k event in Antalya, beating Anne Schaefer in the final. Following this, Moore and semi-regular doubles partner Conny Perrin played the WTA Tour event in Rio de Janeiro. This was her first WTA event in over two years. Entering would prove a wise choice as Moore and Perrin reached their first ever WTA Tour final, after a run that included a quarterfinal victory over second seeds Marina Erakovic and Sílvia Soler Espinosa. They were beaten by fourth seeds, Verónica Cepede Royg and María Irigoyen, in the title match.

In April 2019, at a ITF World Tour event in Sunderland against Jessika Ponchet, Moore was trailing 0–6, 0–5 and facing match point, but made a comeback to win 0–6, 7–6, 6–3.

=== 2024–2025: Return to tennis, doping ban ===
Moore returned to competitive tennis for the first time after her suspension was lifted when she teamed up with Annali Olivelle to win an ITF World Tour first-round match against Melania Delai and Francesca Pace in Sardinia on 30 April 2024.

Partnering with Sarah Beth Grey, she reached her first final since her comeback at the grass-court Surbiton Trophy on 7 June but lost out 6–1, 6–1 to Emina Bektas and Aleksandra Krunic.

On 15 July 2025, Moore was suspended until December 2027 for an anti-doping rule violation from 2022, despite being cleared by an independent tribunal 18 months before.

== 2022 Doping case ==
In June 2022, Moore was provisionally suspended from competition by the International Tennis Integrity Agency (ITIA) for an anti-doping rule violation after testing positive for boldenone and nandrolone at a tennis competition in Colombia held in April 2022. Bárbara Gatica also tested positive for the same substances at the same event and their cases were jointly assessed by an independent tribunal panel. In December 2023 the panel ruled that neither player bore any fault nor demonstrated any negligence after concluding that the source of the substances was contaminated meat eaten at the event. In January 2024, the BBC reported that the ITIA is appealing against the tribunal's decision, with that appeal to take place at the Court of Arbitration for Sport (CAS) at a future date.

Moore's case was cited as one of the reasons why the Professional Tennis Players Association in 2025 established their Athlete Counsel & Equity (ACE) Program to provide pro-bono legal support to members in anti-doping and anti-corruption cases.

On 15 July 2025 CAS upheld the ITIA appeal, set aside the tribunal decision and issued Moore with a four-year ban with 19 months credit from the earlier suspension. CAS explained that Moore "did not succeed in proving that the concentration of nandrolone in her sample was consistent with the ingestion of contaminated meat" and that she had "failed to establish that [it] was not intentional".

== Personal life ==
Tara was previously married to fellow professional tennis player Emina Bektas. She was previously in a long-term relationship with her former doubles partner, Conny Perrin.

== WTA Tour finals ==
=== Doubles: 2 (2 runner-ups) ===
Legend International / WTA 250 (0–2)	Finals by surface Clay (0–2)

Result	W–L	Date	Tournament	Tier	Surface	Partner	Opponents	Score
Loss	0–1	Feb 2016	Rio Open, Brazil	International	Clay	(Switzerland) Conny Perrin	(Paraguay) Verónica Cepede Royg (Argentina) María Irigoyen	1–6, 6–7^{(1–7)}
Loss	0–2	Apr 2022	Copa Colsanitas, Colombia	WTA 250	Clay	(United States) Emina Bektas	(Australia) Astra Sharma (Indonesia) Aldila Sutjiadi	6–4, 4–6, [9–11]

== ITF Circuit finals ==
=== Singles: 17 (9 titles, 8 runner-ups) ===
Legend $50,000 tournaments $25,000 tournaments $10/15,000 tournaments	Finals by surface Hard (7–6) Clay (1–1) Grass (1–1)

Result	W–L	Date	Tournament	Tier	Surface	Opponent	Score
Win	1–0	July 2008	ITF Frinton, United Kingdom	10,000	Grass	(Germany) Mona Barthel	7–5, 6–1
Loss	1–1	May 2010	ITF Edinburgh, United Kingdom	10,000	Clay	(Hungary) Tímea Babos	2–6, 2–6
Win	2–1	Aug 2010	ITF Chiswick, United Kingdom	10,000	Hard	(Republic of Ireland) Amy Bowtell	6–3, 6–4
Loss	2–2	Nov 2011	ITF Sunderland, United Kingdom	10,000	Hard (i)	(Belgium) Alison Van Uytvanck	4–6, 1–6
Win	3–2	Nov 2011	GB Pro-Series Loughborough, United Kingdom	10,000	Hard (i)	(France) Myrtille Georges	7–6^{(5)}, 5–7, 6–4
Loss	3–3	Aug 2012	Tatarstan Open, Russia	50,000	Hard	(Ukraine) Kateryna Kozlova	3–6, 3–6
Win	4–3	Jan 2013	GB Pro-Series Glasgow, United Kingdom	10,000	Hard (i)	(France) Myrtille Georges	6–4, 6–1
Win	5–3	Jan 2013	ITF Preston, United Kingdom	10,000	Hard (i)	(Republic of Ireland) Amy Bowtell	7–6^{(2)}, 6–1
Win	6–3	Feb 2013	ITF Surprise, United States	25,000	Hard	(United States) Louisa Chirico	6–3, 6–1
Loss	6–4	Aug 2013	ITF Woking, United Kingdom	25,000	Hard	(Turkey) Pemra Özgen	6–3, 5–7, 6–7^{(8)}
Win	7–4	Jan 2014	GB Pro-Series Glasgow, United Kingdom	10,000	Hard	(France) Myrtille Georges	6–3, 6–1
Win	8–4	Jan 2016	ITF Antalya, Turkey	10,000	Clay	(Germany) Anne Schäfer	2–6, 7–5, 6–0
Loss	8–5	Jun 2016	Eastbourne Trophy, United Kingdom	50,000	Grass	(United States) Alison Riske	6–4, 6–7^{(5)}, 3–6
Loss	8–6	Aug 2016	ITF Fort Worth, United States	25,000	Hard	(United States) Caitlin Whoriskey	0–6, 4–6
Loss	8–7	Jan 2017	ITF Hong Kong, China	25,000	Hard	(Chinese Taipei) Lee Ya-hsuan	6–2, 6–7^{(4)}, 3–6
Win	9–7	Apr 2018	ITF Sharm El Sheikh, Egypt	15,000	Hard	(Greece) Eleni Kordolaimi	6–0, 6–1
Loss	9–8	Apr 2018	ITF Sharm El Sheikh, Egypt	15,000	Hard	(Bulgaria) Julia Terziyska	2–6, 6–4, 4–6

=== Doubles: 45 (18 titles, 27 runner-ups) ===
Legend W100 tournaments $80,000 tournaments W60/75 tournaments W50 tournaments W25 tournaments $10/15,000 tournaments	Finals by surface Hard (16–18) Clay (2–5) Grass (0–3) Carpet (0–1)

Result	W–L	Date	Tournament	Tier	Surface	Partner	Opponents	Score
Loss	0–1	Nov 2008	ITF Sunderland, UK	10,000	Hard (i)	(United Kingdom) Katharina Brown	(Netherlands) Daniëlle Harmsen (Netherlands) Kim Kilsdonk	7–6^{(4)}, 4–6, [4–10]
Loss	0–2	Nov 2008	ITF Jersey, UK	10,000	Hard (i)	(United Kingdom) Elizabeth Thomas	(Netherlands) Daniëlle Harmsen (Netherlands) Kim Kilsdonk	6–7^{(4)}, 4–6
Loss	0–3	May 2010	ITF Edinburgh, UK	10,000	Clay	(Hungary) Tímea Babos	(United Kingdom) Amanda Elliott (United Kingdom) Jocelyn Rae	6–7^{(5)}, 4–6
Win	1–3	Jul 2010	ITF Wrexham, UK	25,000	Hard	(United Kingdom) Francesca Stephenson	(Finland) Emma Laine (India) Sania Mirza	2–6, 6–3, [13–11]
Loss	1–4	Nov 2010	ITF Sunderland, UK	10,000	Hard (i)	(United Kingdom) Francesca Stephenson	(United Kingdom) Amanda Elliott (United Kingdom) Anna Fitzpatrick	2–6, 3–6
Loss	1–5	Mar 2011	GB Pro-Series Bath, UK	10,000	Hard (i)	(Finland) Emma Laine	(Italy) Giulia Gatto-Monticone (Italy) Anastasia Grymalska	4–6, 6–2, [6–10]
Loss	1–6	Aug 2011	ITF İstanbul, Turkey	10,000	Hard (i)	(United Kingdom) Lisa Whybourn	(Germany) Christina Shakovets (India) Ashvarya Shrivastava	6–3, 6–1
Win	2–6	Nov 2011	GB Pro-Series Loughborough, UK	10,000	Hard (i)	(United Kingdom) Francesca Stephenson	(Denmark) Malou Ejdesgaard (United Kingdom) Amanda Elliott	3–6, 6–2, [10–3]
Loss	2–7	Apr 2012	ITF Antalya, Turkey	10,000	Hard	(United Kingdom) Lucy Brown	(China) Lu Jiajing (China) Lu Jiaxiang	1–6, 0–6
Win	3–7	Jan 2013	GB Pro-Series Glasgow, UK	10,000	Hard (i)	(United Kingdom) Melanie South	(United Kingdom) Anna Smith (United Kingdom) Francesca Stephenson	7–6^{(5)}, 6–3
Loss	3–8	Jan 2013	ITF Preston, UK	10,000	Hard (i)	(United Kingdom) Melanie South	(United Kingdom) Samantha Murray (United Kingdom) Jade Windley	3–6, 6–3, [5–10]
Win	4–8	Feb 2013	ITF Rancho Mirage, US	25k	Hard (i)	(United Kingdom) Melanie South	(United States) Jan Abaza (United States) Louisa Chirico	4–6, 6–2, [12–10]
Loss	4–9	Apr 2013	ITF Phuket, Thailand	25k	Hard (i)	(United Kingdom) Melanie South	(Thailand) Nicha Lertpitaksinchai (Thailand) Peangtarn Plipuech	6–3, 5–7, [11–9]
Win	5–9	Jul 2013	ITF Woking, UK	25k	Hard	(Russia) Marta Sirotkina	(Japan) Kanae Hisami (Japan) Mari Tanaka	4–6, 6–1, [10–7]
Win	6–9	Mar 2014	ITF Preston, UK	25k	Hard	(Russia) Marta Sirotkina	(Switzerland) Timea Bacsinszky (Germany) Kristina Barrois	3–6, 6–1, [13–11]
Loss	6–10	Feb 2015	GB Pro-Series Glasgow, UK	25k	Hard (i)	(Switzerland) Conny Perrin	(Italy) Corinna Dentoni (Italy) Claudia Giovine	6–0, 1–6, [7–10]
Win	7–10	Mar 2015	ITF Antalya, Turkey	10k	Clay	(Sweden) Cornelia Lister	(Germany) Kim Grajdek (Australia) Alexandra Nancarrow	7–6^{(0)}, 7–5
Loss	7–11	Jun 2015	Surbiton Trophy, UK	50k	Grass	(United Kingdom) Nicola Slater	(Ukraine) Lyudmyla Kichenok (Switzerland) Xenia Knoll	6–7^{(6)}, 3–6
Loss	7–12	Jul 2015	ITF Rome, Italy	25k	Clay	(Switzerland) Conny Perrin	(Italy) Claudia Giovine (Greece) Despina Papamichail	4–6, 6–7^{(2)}
Loss	7–13	Feb 2016	ITF São Paulo, Brazil	25k	Clay	(Switzerland) Conny Perrin	(Argentina) Catalina Pella (Chile) Daniela Seguel	3–6, 1–6
Loss	7–14	Feb 2017	AK Ladies Open, Germany	25k	Carpet (i)	(Switzerland) Conny Perrin	(Romania) Alexandra Cadanțu (Sweden) Cornelia Lister	2–6, 6–3, [9–11]
Loss	7–15	Mar 2017	ITF Santa Margherita di Pula, Italy	25k	Clay	(Switzerland) Conny Perrin	(Russia) Olesya Pervushina (Ukraine) Dayana Yastremska	4–6, 4–6
Win	8–15	Sep 2017	Albuquerque Championships, US	80k	Hard	(Switzerland) Conny Perrin	(Switzerland) Viktorija Golubic (Switzerland) Amra Sadiković	6–3, 6–3
Loss	8–16	Oct 2017	ITF Florence, US	25k	Hard	(Switzerland) Amra Sadikovic	(United States) Maria Sanchez (United States) Taylor Townsend	1–6, 2–6
Loss	8–17	Feb 2018	GB Pro-Series Loughborough, UK	25k	Hard (i)	(Switzerland) Conny Perrin	(Netherlands) Michaëlla Krajicek (Netherlands) Bibiane Schoofs	7–6^{(5)}, 1–6, [6–10]
Win	9–17	Mar 2018	ITF São Paulo, Brazil	25k	Clay	(Switzerland) Conny Perrin	(Chinese Taipei) Hsu Chieh-yu (Mexico) Marcela Zacarías	6–4, 3–6, [13–11]
Win	10–17	Apr 2018	ITF Sharm El Sheikh, Egypt	15k	Hard	(Greece) Eleni Kordolaimi	(India) Rutuja Bhosale (India) Kanika Vaidya	6–4, 6–1
Loss	10–18	May 2018	Fukuoka International, Japan	60k	Carpet	(Switzerland) Amra Sadikovic	(United Kingdom) Naomi Broady (United States) Asia Muhammad	2–6, 0–6
Loss	10–19	Oct 2018	ITF Florence, US	25k	Hard	(Switzerland) Conny Perrin	(Kazakhstan) Anna Danilina (Norway) Ulrikke Eikeri	7–6^{(9)}, 2–6, [8–10]
Win	11–19	Oct 2018	Challenger de Saguenay, Canada	60k	Hard (i)	(Switzerland) Conny Perrin	(Canada) Sharon Fichman (United States) Maria Sanchez	6–0, 5–7, [10–7]
Loss	11–20	Mar 2019	ITF Nishitama, Japan	W25	Hard	(United States) Emina Bektas	(Japan) Haruna Arakawa (Japan) Minori Yonehara	4–6, 3–6
Loss	11–21	Mar 2019	Kōfu International Open, Japan	W25	Hard	(United States) Emina Bektas	(Chinese Taipei) Chang Kai-chen (Chinese Taipei) Hsu Ching-wen	1–6, 3–6
Loss	11–22	Apr 2019	ITF Sunderland, UK	W25	Hard (i)	(United States) Emina Bektas	(Poland) Maja Chwalińska (Norway) Ulrikke Eikeri	4–6, 6–3, [9–11]
Win	12–22	Sep 2019	ITF Redding, US	W25	Hard	(United States) Emina Bektas	(United States) Catherine Harrison (New Zealand) Paige Hourigan	6–3, 6–1
Win	13–22	Oct 2019	ITF Florence, US	W25	Hard	(United States) Emina Bektas	(Australia) Olivia Tjandramulia (Mexico) Marcela Zacarias	7-5, 6–4
Win	14–22	Jan 2021	Georgia's Rome Open, US	W60	Hard	(United States) Emina Bektas	(Belarus) Olga Govortsova (Serbia) Jovana Jović	5–7, 6–2, [10–8]
Win	15–22	Feb 2021	ITF Orlando, US	W25	Hard	(United States) Emina Bektas	(Switzerland) Conny Perrin (Colombia) Camila Osorio	7–5, 2–6, [10–5]
Loss	15–23	Mar 2021	ITF Newport Beach, US	W25	Hard	(United States) Emina Bektas	(United States) Vania King (United States) Maegan Manasse	4–6, 2–6
Win	16–23	Apr 2021	Dubai Challenge, UAE	W25	Hard	(United States) Emina Bektas	(Turkey) Berfu Cengiz (Turkey) İpek Öz	7–5, 4–6, [10–7]
Loss	16–24	Oct 2021	Las Vegas Open, US	W60	Hard	(United States) Emina Bektas	(United States) Quinn Gleason (Slovakia) Tereza Mihalíková	6–7^{(5)}, 5–7
Win	17–24	Jan 2022	Traralgon International, Australia	W60	Hard	(United States) Emina Bektas	(United States) Catherine Harrison (Indonesia) Aldila Sutjiadi	0–6, 7–6^{(1)}, [10-8]
Loss	17–25	Feb 2022	Georgia's Rome Open, US	W60	Hard (i)	(United States) Emina Bektas	(United States) Sophie Chang (United States) Angela Kulikov	3–6, 7–6^{(2)}, [7–10]
Loss	17–26	Jun 2024	Surbiton Trophy, UK	W100	Grass	(United Kingdom) Sarah Beth Grey	(United States) Emina Bektas (Serbia) Aleksandra Krunić	1–6, 1–6
Loss	17–27	May 2025	ITF Indian Harbour Beach, US	W50	Clay	(United States) Abigail Rencheli	(United States) Haley Giavara (Australia) Alexandra Osborne	3–6, 6–3, [7–10]
Win	18–27	June 2025	Palmetto Pro Open, US	W75	Hard	(United States) Abigail Rencheli	(Chinese Taipei) Liang En-shuo (China) Ma Yexin	7–5, 6–2
