= 2025 Los Cabos Open – Singles =

Singles
- 2025 Los Cabos Open

Final
- Champion: (Canada) Denis Shapovalov
- Runner-up: (United States) Aleksandar Kovacevic
- Score: 6–4, 6–2

Details
- Draw: 28 (4 Q / 3 WC )
- Seeds: 8

Events
Singles	Doubles
- Los Cabos Open

Denis Shapovalov defeated Aleksandar Kovacevic in the final, 6–4, 6–2 to win the singles tennis title at the 2025 Los Cabos Open. He did not lose a set en route to his fourth career ATP Tour title, and first outside of indoor hardcourts. Shapovalov and Kovacevic were the first pair of players with one-handed backhands to contest an ATP Tour final since Stefanos Tsitsipas and Dominic Thiem at the 2019 ATP Finals.

Jordan Thompson was the reigning champion, but withdrew before the tournament began.

== Seeds ==
The top four seeds received a bye into the second round.

1. Andrey Rublev (semifinals)
2. (Spain) Alejandro Davidovich Fokina (second round)
3. (Canada) Denis Shapovalov (champion)
4. (France) Quentin Halys (second round)
5. (Germany) Daniel Altmaier (second round)
6. (China) Bu Yunchaokete (second round)
7. (United States) Aleksandar Kovacevic (final)
8. (Australia) Adam Walton (semifinals)

== Draw ==
Key

- Q = Qualifier
- WC = Wild card
- LL = Lucky loser
- Alt = Alternate
- ITF = ITF entry
- PR = Protected ranking
- SR = Special ranking
- SE = Special exempt
- JE = Junior exempt
- JR = Junior Accelerator Programme entrant
- CO = College Accelerator Programme entrant
- NG = Next Gen Accelerator Program entrant
- w/o = Walkover
- r = Retired
- d = Defaulted

=== Finals ===
Semifinals
1	Andrey Rublev	6	4	4
7	(United States) Aleksandar Kovacevic	3	6	6
3	(Canada) Denis Shapovalov	6	6
8	(Australia) Adam Walton	2	2

Final
7	(United States) Aleksandar Kovacevic	4	2
3	(Canada) Denis Shapovalov	6	6

=== Top half ===
First round
(Japan) T Daniel	6	5	4
WC	(Mexico) A Hernández	3	7	6
(Australia) A Vukic	6^{4}	3
(United States) E Nava	7^{7}	6
Q	(Mexico) A Magadán	6^{5}	2
6	(China) Y Bu	7^{7}	6
A Kachmazov	3	2
(Argentina) JP Ficovich	6	6
(Australia) J McCabe	1	2
WC	(Mexico) LC Álvarez	6	6
(Lebanon) H Habib	1	6	3
7	(United States) A Kovacevic	6	3	6

Second round
1	A Rublev	6	6
WC	(Mexico) A Hernández	3	2
(United States) E Nava	3	7	7^{8}
6	(China) Y Bu	6	5	6^{6}
4	(France) Q Halys	4	7^{7}	3
(Argentina) JP Ficovich	6	6^{5}	6
WC	(Mexico) LC Álvarez	5	4
7	(United States) A Kovacevic	7	6

Quarterfinals
1	A Rublev	5	6	6
(United States) E Nava	7	4	3
(Argentina) JP Ficovich	3	1
7	(United States) A Kovacevic	6	6

Semifinals
1	A Rublev	6	4	4
7	(United States) A Kovacevic	3	6	6

=== Bottom half ===
First round
5	(Germany) D Altmaier	6	6
(United States) M Krueger	4	3
Q	(China) Y Wu	6	4	1
(Australia) T Schoolkate	4	6	6
(United States) C Smith	4	2
Q	(United States) G Nanda	6	6
8	(Australia) A Walton	7^{7}	6
WC	(Mexico) R Pacheco Méndez	6^{5}	2
Q	(Colombia) N Mejía	4	1
(United States) N Basavareddy	6	6
(Australia) J Duckworth	6	6
(France) A Mannarino	3	4

Second round
5	(Germany) D Altmaier	3	4
(Australia) T Schoolkate	6	6
Q	(United States) G Nanda	1	2
3	(Canada) D Shapovalov	6	6
8	(Australia) A Walton	6	6
(United States) N Basavareddy	1	0
(Australia) J Duckworth	6	6
2	(Spain) A Davidovich Fokina	3	4

Quarterfinals
(Australia) T Schoolkate	3	2
3	(Canada) D Shapovalov	6	6
8	(Australia) A Walton	3	6	6
(Australia) J Duckworth	6	3	4

Semifinals
3	(Canada) D Shapovalov	6	6
8	(Australia) A Walton	2	2

== Qualifying ==
=== Seeds ===
1. (Estonia) Mark Lajal (qualifying competition)
2. (United States) Murphy Cassone (qualifying competition)
3. (Japan) Yasutaka Uchiyama (first round)
4. (Australia) Bernard Tomic (qualifying competition, retired)
5. (Colombia) Nicolás Mejía (qualified)
6. (China) Wu Yibing (qualified)
7. (Australia) Moerani Bouzige (first round)
8. (United States) Govind Nanda (qualified)

=== Qualifiers ===
1. (Mexico) Alan Magadán
2. (Colombia) Nicolás Mejía
3. (United States) Govind Nanda
4. (China) Wu Yibing

=== Qualifying draw ===
==== First qualifier ====
First round
1	(Estonia) Mark Lajal	6	6
WC	(Mexico) Luca Lemaitre	2	3
Alt	(Mexico) Alan Magadán	5	6	7^{7}
7/Alt	(Australia) Moerani Bouzige	7	3	6^{5}

Qualifying competition
1	(Estonia) Mark Lajal	3	2
Alt	(Mexico) Alan Magadán	6	6

==== Second qualifier ====
First round
2	(United States) Murphy Cassone	6	2	6
Alt	(United States) Evan Zhu	1	6	4
Alt	(United States) Isaiah Strode	2	5
5	(Colombia) Nicolás Mejía	6	7

Qualifying competition
2	(United States) Murphy Cassone	3	5
5	(Colombia) Nicolás Mejía	6	7

==== Third qualifier ====
First round
3	(Japan) Yasutaka Uchiyama	4	4
Alt	(Morocco) Taha Baadi	6	6
WC	(United States) Strong Kirchheimer	4	1
8	(United States) Govind Nanda	6	6

Qualifying competition
Alt	(Morocco) Taha Baadi	4	2
8	(United States) Govind Nanda	6	6

==== Fourth qualifier ====
First round
4	(Australia) Bernard Tomic	6	6
Alt	(United States) Elijah Strode	2	2
Alt	(United States) Braden Shick	1	4
6	(China) Wu Yibing	6	6

Qualifying competition
4	(Australia) Bernard Tomic	6^{3}	1^{r}
6	(China) Wu Yibing	7^{7}	3
