= Tomasz Wiktorowski =

Polish tennis coach and commentator (born 1981)

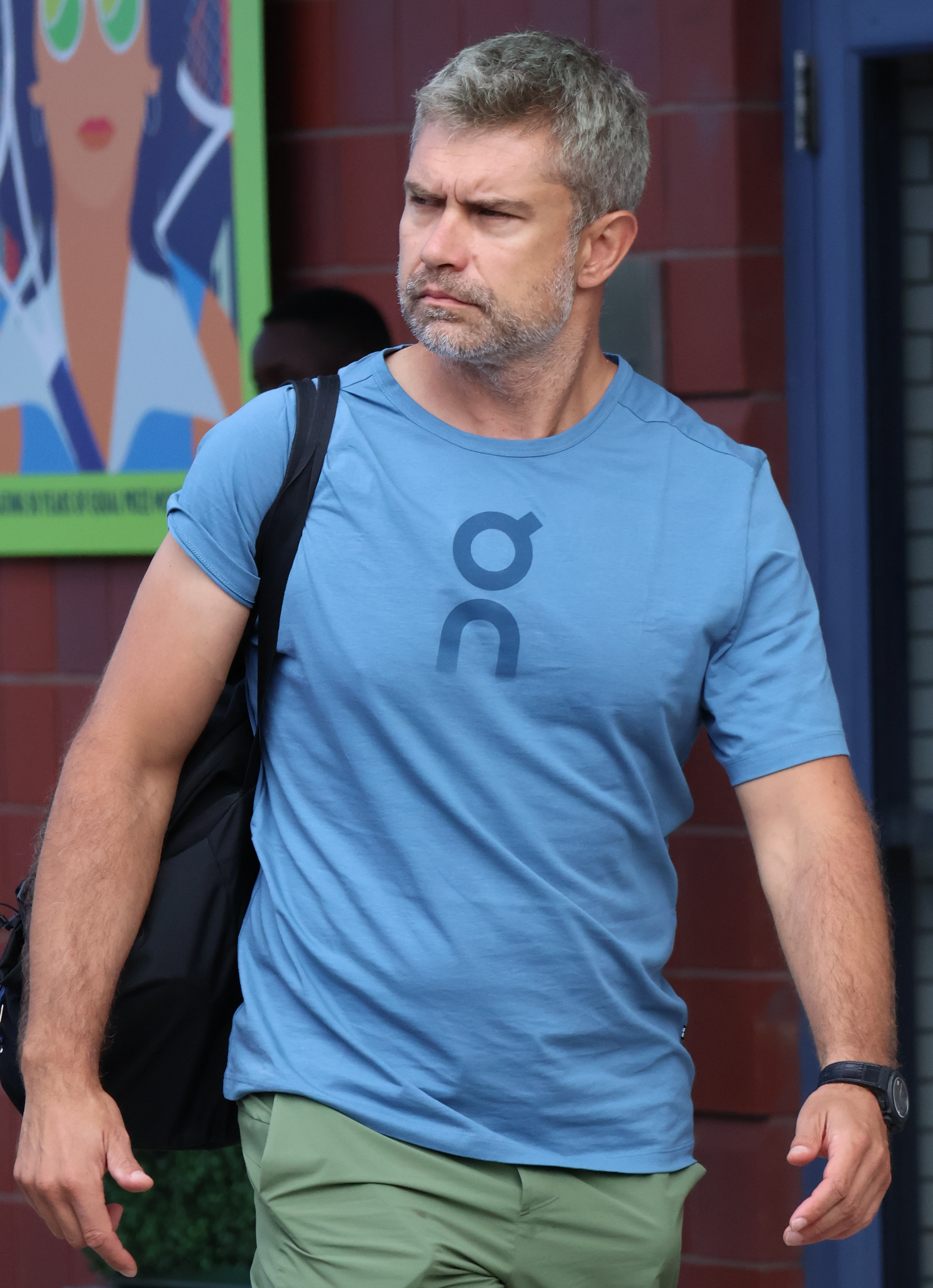
- Wiktorowski at the 2023 US Open
- Country (sports): Poland
- Born: 10 January 1981 (age 45) Warsaw, Poland

Coaching career
- Agnieszka Radwańska (2011–2018); Olga Danilović (2019–2020); Iga Świątek (2021–2024); Naomi Osaka (2025–present)

Coaching achievements
- Coachee singles titles total: 35
- List of notable tournaments (with champion): 2015 WTA Finals (Radwańska); 2022 French Open (Świątek); 2022 US Open (Świątek); 2023 French Open (Świątek); 2023 WTA Finals (Świątek); 2024 French Open (Świątek)

Tomasz Wiktorowski (born 10 January 1981) is a Polish tennis coach. He currently coaches Naomi Osaka. He coached Agnieszka Radwańska from 2011 to 2018 and Iga Świątek from the end of 2021 to October 2024.

== Early life ==
Wiktorowski was born in 1981 in Warsaw. As a junior tennis player, he trained at a local tennis club in Warsaw and played briefly on the ITF Junior Circuit in 1998 and 1999. He graduated from the automotive department of the Warsaw University of Technology in 2005.

== Coaching career ==
Wiktorowski has become known as one of Poland's foremost tennis minds. He began serving as captain of the Polish Fed Cup team in 2009 and coached Poland's Olympic tennis contingent in 2012 and 2016. He has also worked as a tennis commentator for Eurosport Polska and TVP Sport.

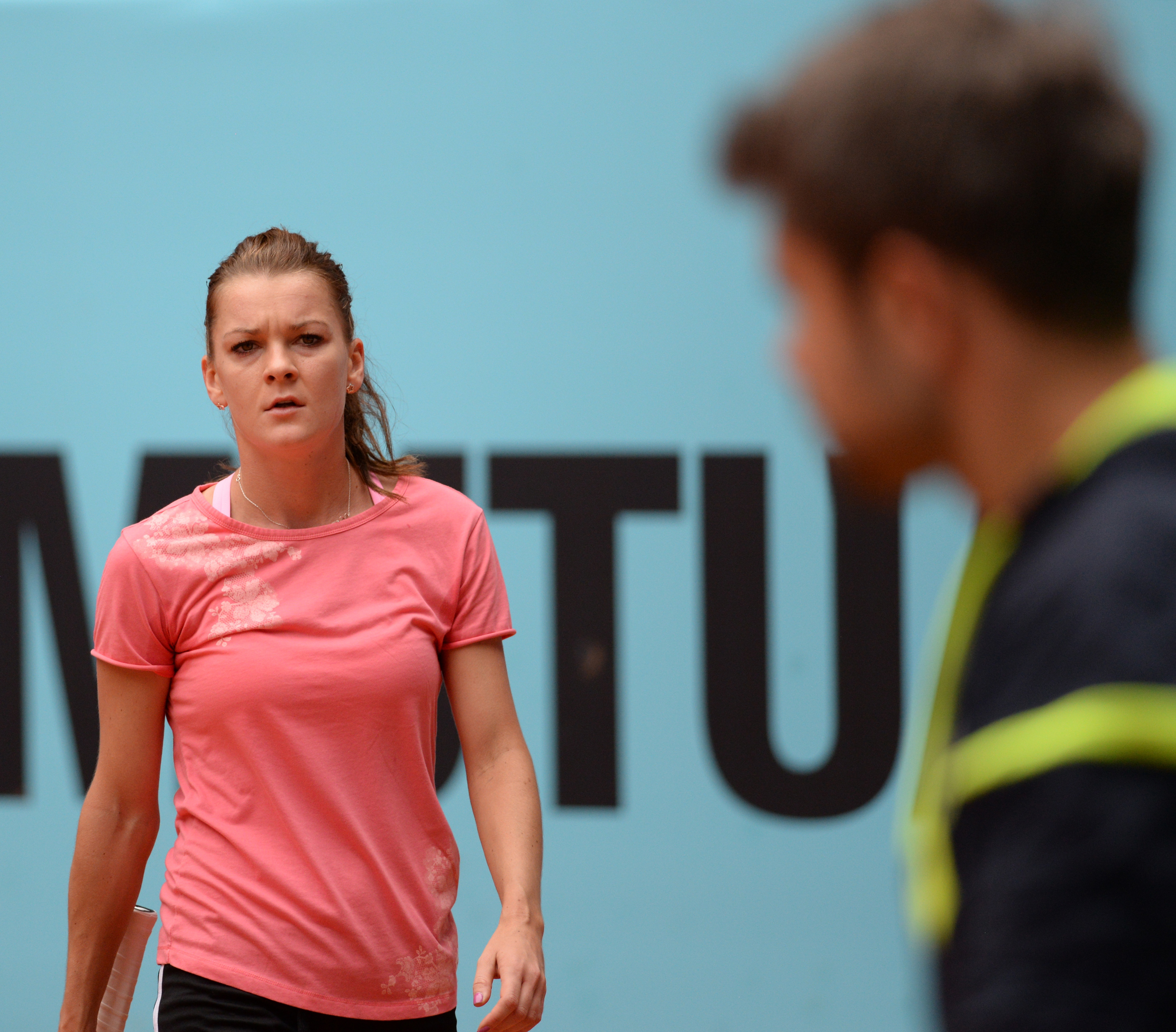
Wiktorowski (foreground) with Radwańska in 2015

In mid-2011, Wiktorowski joined the team of longtime Polish No. 1 Agnieszka Radwańska, eventually replacing her father, Robert, as her primary coach. Radwańska had the best major results of her career with Wiktorowski, reaching the final of the 2012 Wimbledon Championships and making four other major semifinals. Despite never winning a major title, Radwańska got to a career-high WTA ranking of No. 2 and remained in the top 15 into 2017. Wiktorowski has said, referring to her crafty style of play, "There will never be a 'new Radwańska'".

Wiktorowski led Poland into the Fed Cup World Group in 2015, the country's highest showing in years, but they did not advance past the quarterfinals. Wiktorowski stepped down from the captain position later that year, having served in the role for seven years.

After Radwańska's retirement from tennis in 2018, Wiktorowski helped found the JW Tennis Support Foundation, which grants scholarships to young Polish players. In 2020, he began coaching Serbian top 200 player Olga Danilović, until the season was disrupted by the COVID-19 pandemic.

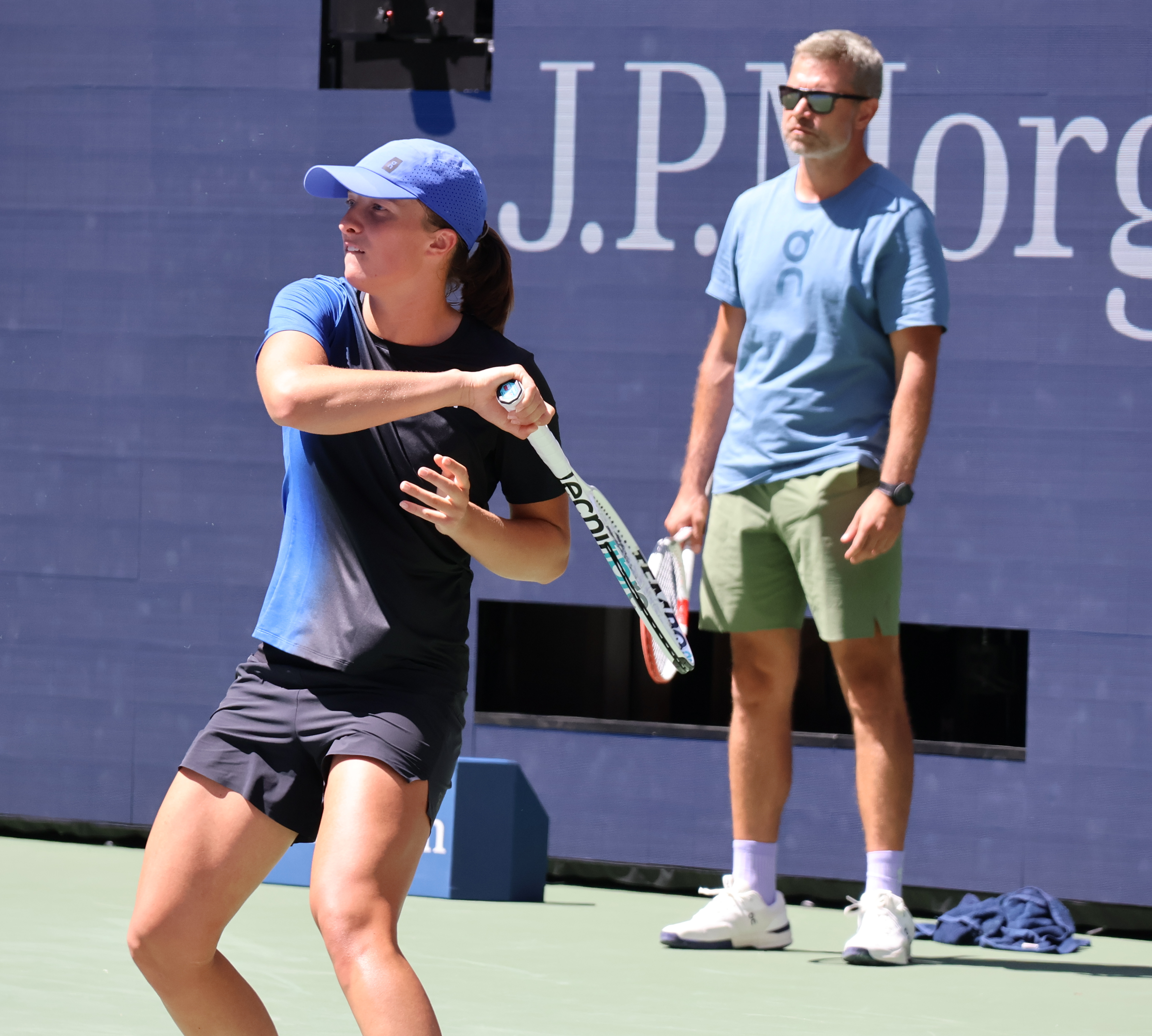
Wiktorowski with Iga Świątek at the 2023 US Open

Wiktorowski joined Iga Świątek's team in the off-season at the end of 2021, replacing longtime coach Piotr Sierzputowski and joining sports psychologist Daria Abramowicz and fitness trainer Maciej Ryszczuk. Wiktorowski and Świątek have both said that he helped her focus on playing more aggressively. Following the retirement of world No. 1 Ashleigh Barty in March 2022, Świątek took over the No. 1 WTA ranking and went on a historic 37-match win streak. Overall she won eight tournaments in 2022, including the French Open and US Open, and she ended the year with a 67–9 record and a huge lead in the WTA rankings. Świątek was named the 2022 WTA Player of the Year, while Wiktorowski was a WTA Coach of the Year nominee. Przegląd Sportowy named Świątek Polish Sports Personality of the Year and Wiktorowski Polish Coach of the Year across all sports.

Though Świątek briefly lost the world No. 1 ranking the next year, she reclaimed it after winning the 2023 WTA Finals. She was again named WTA Player of the Year, and Wiktorowski was named WTA Coach of the Year for the first time.

In October 2024, it was announced that Wiktorowski and Świątek had parted ways.

In July 2025, he started working with Naomi Osaka, former World No.1 and 4-time major champion. During an interview at US Open 2025, Osaka referred to Wiktorowski as a "tennis encyclopedia".

== Personal life ==
Wiktorowski married his wife, Joanna, in 2016.

== Awards ==
- Przegląd Sportowy Polish Coach of the Year (2022)
- WTA Coach of the Year (2023)
