= 2024 Calgary National Bank Challenger – Men's doubles =

Men's doubles
- 2024 Calgary National Bank Challenger

Final
- Champions: (United States) Ryan Seggerman (United States) Patrik Trhac
- Runners-up: (United States) Robert Cash (United States) JJ Tracy
- Score: 6–3, 7–6^{(7–3)}

Events
Singles	men	women
Doubles	men	women
- Calgary National Bank Challenger

Juan Carlos Aguilar and Justin Boulais were the defending champions but lost in the first round to Aziz Dougaz and Courtney John Lock.

Ryan Seggerman and Patrik Trhac won the title after defeating Robert Cash and JJ Tracy 6–3, 7–6^{(7–3)} in the final.

== Seeds ==
1. (United States) Ryan Seggerman / (United States) Patrik Trhac (champions)
2. (United States) Robert Cash / (United States) JJ Tracy (final)
3. (Canada) Liam Draxl / (Canada) Cleeve Harper (semifinals)
4. (Israel) Roy Stepanov / (Canada) Kelsey Stevenson (first round)

== Draw ==
Key

- Q = Qualifier
- WC = Wild card
- LL = Lucky loser
- Alt = Alternate
- ITF = ITF entry
- PR = Protected ranking
- SR = Special ranking
- SE = Special exempt
- JE = Junior exempt
- JR = Junior Accelerator Programme entrant
- CO = College Accelerator Programme entrant
- NG = Next Gen Accelerator Program entrant
- w/o = Walkover
- r = Retired
- d = Defaulted

=== Draw ===
First round
1	(United States) R Seggerman (United States) P Trhac	4	6	[10]
(United States) M Kiger (United States) Patrick Maloney	6	4	[6]
(United States) G Nanda (United States) Jamie Vance	5	6	[10]
Alt	(Japan) Kosuke Ogura (Japan) Leo Vithoontien	7	2	[7]
4	(Israel) R Stepanov (Canada) K Stevenson	4	6	[6]
(United States) A Perez (United States) Jack Vance	6	3	[10]
(Canada) JC Aguilar (Canada) J Boulais	6^{4}	3
(Tunisia) A Dougaz (Zimbabwe) CJ Lock	7^{7}	6
(Colombia) N Mejía (Venezuela) G Oliveira	6	3	[9]
(Germany) T Handel (Germany) L Wessels	2	6	[11]
(Poland) M Kaśnikowski (Germany) P Zahraj	3	6	[3]
3	(Canada) L Draxl (Canada) C Harper	6	3	[10]
WC	(Canada) T Baadi (Canada) Nicaise Muamba	6	6^{5}	[10]
(United States) Henry Barrett (New Zealand) K Pannu	3	7^{7}	[6]
WC	(Canada) Mikael Arseneault (Canada) N Arseneault	3	3
2	(United States) R Cash (United States) JJ Tracy	6	6

Quarterfinals
1	(United States) R Seggerman (United States) P Trhac	6	7^{12}
(United States) G Nanda (United States) Jam Vance	3	6^{10}
(United States) A Perez (United States) Jac Vance	6	2	[7]
(Tunisia) A Dougaz (Zimbabwe) CJ Lock	3	6	[10]
(Germany) T Handel (Germany) L Wessels	2	3
3	(Canada) L Draxl (Canada) C Harper	6	6
WC	(Canada) T Baadi (Canada) N Muamba	4	3
2	(United States) R Cash (United States) JJ Tracy	6	6

Semifinals
1	(United States) R Seggerman (United States) P Trhac	4	6	[10]
(Tunisia) A Dougaz (Zimbabwe) CJ Lock	6	3	[8]
3	(Canada) L Draxl (Canada) C Harper	6^{4}	6	[8]
2	(United States) R Cash (United States) JJ Tracy	7^{7}	4	[10]

Final
1	(United States) R Seggerman (United States) P Trhac	6	7^{7}
2	(United States) R Cash (United States) JJ Tracy	3	6^{3}
