= 2025 Los Cabos Open =

- Date: 14–19 July
- Edition: 9th
- Draw: 28S / 16D
- Surface: Hard / outdoor
- Location: Los Cabos, Mexico
- Venue: Cabo Sports Complex

Champions

Singles
- (Canada) Denis Shapovalov

Doubles
- (United States) Robert Cash / (United States) JJ Tracy
- Los Cabos Open

The 2025 Los Cabos Open (known as the Mifel Tennis Open by Telcel Oppo for sponsorship reasons) was an ATP tennis tournament played on outdoor hardcourts. It was the 9th edition of the tournament, and part of the ATP 250 series of the 2025 ATP Tour. It took place in Los Cabos, Mexico from 14 through 19 July 2025, reversing a schedule change for the tournament from July to February in 2024. This marked the first time in the nine editions of the tournament there were four Mexicans in the singles main draw.

== Champions ==
=== Singles ===
- (Canada) Denis Shapovalov def. (United States) Aleksandar Kovacevic 6–4, 6–2

=== Doubles ===
- (United States) Robert Cash / (United States) JJ Tracy def. (Australia) Blake Bayldon / (Australia) Tristan Schoolkate 7–6^{(7–4)}, 6–4

== Singles main-draw entrants ==
=== Seeds ===
Country	Player	Rank^{1}	Seed
	Andrey Rublev	14	1
ESP	Alejandro Davidovich Fokina	27	2
CAN	Denis Shapovalov	30	3
FRA	Quentin Halys	46	4
GER	Daniel Altmaier	57	5
CHN	Bu Yunchaokete	71	6
USA	Aleksandar Kovacevic	76	7
AUS	Adam Walton	90	8

- Rankings are as of 30 June 2025.

=== Other entrants ===
The following players received wildcards into the main draw:

- (Mexico) Luis Carlos Álvarez
- (Mexico) Alex Hernández
- (Mexico) Rodrigo Pacheco Méndez

The following players received entry from the qualifying draw:

- (Mexico) Alan Magadán
- (Colombia) Nicolás Mejía
- (United States) Govind Nanda
- (China) Wu Yibing

=== Withdrawals ===
- (Croatia) Borna Ćorić → replaced by (United States) Emilio Nava
- (Australia) Rinky Hijikata → replaced by (United States) Colton Smith
- (United States) Brandon Holt → replaced by (Australia) James McCabe
- (Spain) Jaume Munar → replaced by Alibek Kachmazov
- (Italy) Lorenzo Musetti → replaced by (United States) Mitchell Krueger
- (United States) Brandon Nakashima → replaced by (Argentina) Juan Pablo Ficovich
- (Japan) Yoshihito Nishioka → replaced by (Australia) Tristan Schoolkate
- (United Kingdom) Cameron Norrie → replaced by (France) Adrian Mannarino
- (United States) Ethan Quinn → replaced by (Australia) James Duckworth
- (Australia) Jordan Thompson → replaced by (Lebanon) Hady Habib

== Doubles main-draw entrants ==
=== Seeds ===
Country	Player	Country	Player	Rank^{1}	Seed
FRA	Sadio Doumbia	FRA	Fabien Reboul	49	1
USA	Christian Harrison	USA	Rajeev Ram	57	2
USA	Nathaniel Lammons	USA	Jackson Withrow	60	3
AUS	Matthew Ebden	AUS	John Peers	73	4

- ^{1} Rankings are as of 30 June 2025.

=== Other entrants ===
The following pairs received wildcards into the doubles main draw:

- (Colombia) Nicolás Mejía / (Mexico) Rodrigo Pacheco Méndez
- (Mexico) Manuel Sánchez / (Australia) Bernard Tomic

=== Withdrawals ===
- (India) Yuki Bhambri / (New Zealand) Michael Venus → replaced by (Mexico) Hans Hach Verdugo / (Colombia) Cristian Rodríguez
- (Austria) Alexander Erler / (United States) Robert Galloway → replaced by (United States) James Cerretani / (United States) Theo Winegar
- (Australia) Rinky Hijikata / (Australia) Adam Walton → replaced by (Australia) James Duckworth / (Australia) Adam Walton
- (United States) Mackenzie McDonald / (United Kingdom) David Stevenson → replaced by (India) Niki Kaliyanda Poonacha / (India) Jeevan Nedunchezhiyan
- (Croatia) Nikola Mektić / (United States) Rajeev Ram → replaced by (United States) Christian Harrison / (United States) Rajeev Ram
