= WTA Awards =

Tennis awards for women

This article lists the WTA Awards given by the Women's Tennis Association to players and coaches for achievements during a season or their careers.

== Player of the Year ==
Year	Player	Nationality
1977	Virginia Wade	United Kingdom
1978	Martina Navratilova	Czechoslovakia (Note: Martina Navratilova, originally from Czechoslovakia, became a U.S. citizen in 1981.)
1979	Martina Navratilova (2)	Czechoslovakia
1980	Tracy Austin	United States
1981	Chris Evert-Lloyd	United States
1982	Martina Navratilova (3)	United States
1983	Martina Navratilova (4)	United States
1984	Martina Navratilova (5)	United States
1985	Martina Navratilova (6)	United States
1986	Martina Navratilova (7)	United States
1987	Steffi Graf	West Germany
1988	Steffi Graf (2)	West Germany
1989	Steffi Graf (3)	West Germany
1990	Steffi Graf (4)	Germany
1991	Monica Seles	Yugoslavia
1992	Monica Seles (2)	Yugoslavia
1993	Steffi Graf (5)	Germany
1994	Steffi Graf (6)	Germany
1995	Steffi Graf (7)	Germany
1996	Steffi Graf (8)	Germany
1997	Martina Hingis	Switzerland
1998	Lindsay Davenport	United States
1999	Lindsay Davenport (2)	United States
2000	Venus Williams	United States
2001	Jennifer Capriati	United States
2002	Serena Williams	United States
2003	Justine Henin	Belgium
2004	Maria Sharapova	Russia
2005	Kim Clijsters	Belgium
2006	Amélie Mauresmo	France
2007	Justine Henin (2)	Belgium
2008	Serena Williams (2)	United States
2009	Serena Williams (3)	United States
2010	Kim Clijsters (2)	Belgium
2011	Petra Kvitová	Czech Republic
2012	Serena Williams (4)	United States
2013	Serena Williams (5)	United States
2014	Serena Williams (6)	United States
2015	Serena Williams (7)	United States
2016	Angelique Kerber	Germany
2017	Garbiñe Muguruza	Spain
2018	Simona Halep	Romania
2019	Ashleigh Barty	Australia
2020	Sofia Kenin	United States
2021	Ashleigh Barty (2)	Australia
2022	Iga Świątek	Poland
2023	Iga Świątek (2)	Poland
2024	Aryna Sabalenka	Belarus (Note: Since 2022, Russian and Belarus players are not allowed to compete under the name or flag of their country following the Russian invasion of Ukraine.)
2025	Aryna Sabalenka (2)	Belarus
2026		

== Doubles Team of the Year ==
Year	Player	Nationality
1977	Martina Navratilova; Betty Stöve	Czechoslovakia; Netherlands
1978	Billie Jean King; Martina Navratilova	United States; Czechoslovakia
1979	Billie Jean King; Martina Navratilova (2)	United States; Czechoslovakia
1980	Kathy Jordan; Anne Smith	United States; United States
1981	Martina Navratilova; Pam Shriver	United States; United States
1982	Martina Navratilova; Pam Shriver (2)	United States; United States
1983	Martina Navratilova; Pam Shriver (3)	United States; United States
1984	Martina Navratilova; Pam Shriver (4)	United States; United States
1985	Martina Navratilova; Pam Shriver (5)	United States; United States
1986	Martina Navratilova; Pam Shriver (6)	United States; United States
1987	Martina Navratilova; Pam Shriver (7)	United States; United States
1988	Martina Navratilova; Pam Shriver (8)	United States; United States
1989	Jana Novotná; Helena Suková	Czechoslovakia; Czechoslovakia
1990	Jana Novotná; Helena Suková (2)	Czechoslovakia; Czechoslovakia
1991	Gigi Fernández; Jana Novotná	United States; Czechoslovakia
1992	Larisa Neiland; Natasha Zvereva	Latvia; Belarus
1993	Gigi Fernández; Natasha Zvereva	United States; Belarus
1994	Gigi Fernández; Natasha Zvereva (2)	United States; Belarus
1995	Gigi Fernández; Natasha Zvereva (3)	United States; Belarus
1996	Jana Novotná; Arantxa Sánchez Vicario	Czech Republic; Spain
1997	Gigi Fernández; Natasha Zvereva (4)	United States; Belarus
1998	Martina Hingis; Jana Novotná	Switzerland; Czech Republic
1999	Martina Hingis; Anna Kournikova	Switzerland; Russia
2000	Serena Williams; Venus Williams	United States; United States
2001	Lisa Raymond; Rennae Stubbs	United States; Australia
2002	Virginia Ruano Pascual; Paola Suárez	Spain; Argentina
2003	Virginia Ruano Pascual; Paola Suárez (2)	Spain; Argentina
2004	Virginia Ruano Pascual; Paola Suárez (3)	Spain; Argentina
2005	Lisa Raymond; Samantha Stosur	United States; Australia
2006	Lisa Raymond; Samantha Stosur (2)	United States; Australia
2007	Cara Black; Liezel Huber	Zimbabwe; United States
2008	Cara Black; Liezel Huber (2)	Zimbabwe; United States
2009	Serena Williams; Venus Williams (2)	United States; United States
2010	Gisela Dulko; Flavia Pennetta	Argentina; Italy
2011	Květa Peschke; Katarina Srebotnik	Czech Republic; Slovenia
2012	Sara Errani; Roberta Vinci	Italy; Italy
2013	Sara Errani; Roberta Vinci (2)	Italy; Italy
2014	Sara Errani; Roberta Vinci (3)	Italy; Italy
2015	Martina Hingis; Sania Mirza	Switzerland; India
2016	Caroline Garcia; Kristina Mladenovic	France; France
2017	Martina Hingis; Chan Yung-jan	Switzerland; Chinese Taipei
2018	Barbora Krejčíková; Kateřina Siniaková	Czech Republic; Czech Republic
2019	Tímea Babos; Kristina Mladenovic	Hungary; France
2020	Tímea Babos; Kristina Mladenovic (2)	Hungary; France
2021	Barbora Krejčíková; Kateřina Siniaková (2)	Czech Republic; Czech Republic
2022	Barbora Krejčíková; Kateřina Siniaková (3)	Czech Republic; Czech Republic
2023	Storm Hunter; Elise Mertens	Australia; Belgium
2024	Sara Errani; Jasmine Paolini	Italy; Italy
2025	Kateřina Siniaková; Taylor Townsend	Czech Republic; United States
2026		

== Most Improved Player of the Year ==
Year	Player	Nationality
1977	Wendy Turnbull	Australia
1978	Virginia Ruzici	Romania
1979	Sylvia Hanika	West Germany
1980	Hana Mandlíková	Czechoslovakia (Note: Hana Mandlíková became an Australian citizen in 1988.)
1981	Barbara Potter	United States
1982	Sabina Simmonds	Italy
1983	Andrea Temesvári	Hungary
1984	Kathy Jordan	United States
1985	Helena Suková	Czechoslovakia
1986	Steffi Graf	West Germany
1987	Lori McNeil	United States
1988	Arantxa Sánchez Vicario	Spain
1989	Arantxa Sánchez Vicario (2)	Spain
1990	Monica Seles	Yugoslavia (Note: Monica Seles, originally from Yugoslavia, became a U.S. citizen in 1994.)
1991	Gabriela Sabatini	Argentina
1992	Kimiko Date	Japan
1993	Magdalena Maleeva	Bulgaria
1994	Mary Pierce	France
1995	Chanda Rubin	United States
1996	Martina Hingis	Switzerland
1997	Amanda Coetzer	South Africa
1998	Patty Schnyder	Switzerland
1999	Serena Williams	United States
2000	Elena Dementieva	Russia
2001	Justine Henin	Belgium
2002	Daniela Hantuchová	Slovakia
2003	Nadia Petrova	Russia
2004	Maria Sharapova	Russia
2005	Ana Ivanovic	Serbia and Montenegro
2006	Jelena Janković	Serbia
2007	Ana Ivanovic (2)	Serbia
2008	Dinara Safina	Russia
2009	Yanina Wickmayer	Belgium
2010	Francesca Schiavone	Italy
2011	Petra Kvitová	Czech Republic
2012	Sara Errani	Italy
2013	Simona Halep	Romania
2014	Eugenie Bouchard	Canada
2015	Timea Bacsinszky	Switzerland
2016	Johanna Konta	United Kingdom
2017	Jeļena Ostapenko	Latvia
2018	Kiki Bertens	Netherlands
2019	Sofia Kenin	United States
2020	Iga Świątek	Poland
2021	Barbora Krejcikova	Czech Republic
2022	Beatriz Haddad Maia	Brazil
2023	Zheng Qinwen	China
2024	Emma Navarro	United States
2025	Amanda Anisimova	United States
2026		

== Newcomer of the Year ==
Year	Player	Nationality
1977	Tracy Austin	United States
1978	Pam Shriver	United States
1979	Kathy Jordan	United States
1980	Andrea Jaeger	United States
1981	Kathy Rinaldi	United States
1982	Zina Garrison	United States
1983	Carling Bassett	Canada
1984	Manuela Maleeva	Bulgaria
1985	Gabriela Sabatini	Argentina
1986	Stephanie Rehe	United States
1987	Arantxa Sánchez Vicario	Spain
1988	Natalia Zvereva	Soviet Union
1989	Conchita Martínez	Spain
1990	Jennifer Capriati	United States
1991	Andrea Strnadová	Czechoslovakia
1992	Debbie Graham	United States
1993	Iva Majoli	Croatia
1994	Irina Spîrlea	Romania
1995	Martina Hingis	Switzerland
1996	Anna Kournikova	Russia
1997	Venus Williams	United States
1998	Serena Williams	United States
1999	Kim Clijsters	Belgium
2000	Dája Bedáňová	Czech Republic
2001	Daniela Hantuchová	Slovakia
2002	Svetlana Kuznetsova	Russia
2003	Maria Sharapova	Russia
2004	Tatiana Golovin	France
2005	Sania Mirza	India
2006	Agnieszka Radwańska	Poland
2007	Ágnes Szávay	Hungary
2008	Caroline Wozniacki	Denmark
2009	Melanie Oudin	United States
2010	Petra Kvitová	Czech Republic
2011	Irina-Camelia Begu	Romania
2012	Laura Robson	United Kingdom
2013	Eugenie Bouchard	Canada
2014	Belinda Bencic	Switzerland
2015	Daria Gavrilova	Russia (Note: Daria Gavrilova, originally from Russia, became an Australian citizen in December 2015.)
2016	Naomi Osaka	Japan
2017	Catherine Bellis	United States
2018	Aryna Sabalenka	Belarus
2019	Bianca Andreescu	Canada
2020	Nadia Podoroska	Argentina
2021	Emma Raducanu	United Kingdom
2022	Zheng Qinwen	China
2023	Mirra Andreeva	Russia
2024	Lulu Sun	New Zealand (Note: Sun, originally from New Zealand, represented Switzerland until March 2024.)
2025	Victoria Mboko	Canada
2026		

== Comeback Player of the Year ==
Year	Player	Nationality
1987	Bettina Bunge	West Germany
1988	Pascale Paradis	France
1989	Kathy Rinaldi	United States
1990	Elizabeth Smylie	Australia
1991	Stephanie Rehe	United States
1992	Jenny Byrne	Australia
1993	Elizabeth Smylie (2)	Australia
1994	Meredith McGrath	United States
1995	Monica Seles	United States
1996	Jennifer Capriati	United States
1997	Mary Pierce	France
1998	Monica Seles (2)	United States
1999	Sabine Appelmans	Belgium
2000	Iva Majoli	Croatia
2001	Barbara Schwartz	Austria
2002	Corina Morariu	United States
2003	Amélie Mauresmo	France
2004	Serena Williams	United States
2005	Kim Clijsters	Belgium
2006	Martina Hingis	Switzerland
2007	Lindsay Davenport	United States
2008	Zheng Jie	China
2009	Kim Clijsters (2)	Belgium
2010	Justine Henin	Belgium
2011	Sabine Lisicki	Germany
2012	Yaroslava Shvedova	Kazakhstan (Note: Yaroslava Shvedova, originally from Russia, became a Kazakh citizen in 2008.)
2013	Alisa Kleybanova	Russia
2014	Mirjana Lučić-Baroni	Croatia
2015	Venus Williams	United States
2016	Dominika Cibulková	Slovakia
2017	Sloane Stephens	United States
2018	Serena Williams (2)	United States
2019	Belinda Bencic	Switzerland
2020	Victoria Azarenka	Belarus
2021	Carla Suárez Navarro	Spain
2022	Tatjana Maria	Germany
2023	Elina Svitolina	Ukraine
2024	Paula Badosa	Spain
2025	Belinda Bencic (2)	Switzerland
2026		

== Diamond Aces ==
This award is named for the late WTA trailblazer Jerry Diamond and is awarded to the player who gives endlessly to promote the game of tennis on and off the court.

Year	Player	Nationality
1995	Arantxa Sánchez Vicario	Spain
1996	Gabriela Sabatini	Argentina
1997	Amanda Coetzer	South Africa
1998	Lindsay Davenport	United States
1999	Lindsay Davenport (2)	United States
2000	Martina Hingis	Switzerland
2001	Martina Hingis (2)	Switzerland
2002	Not awarded	
2003	Not awarded	
2004	Anastasia Myskina	Russia
2005	Anastasia Myskina (2)	Russia
2006	Svetlana Kuznetsova	Russia
2007	Jelena Janković	Serbia
2008	Ana Ivanovic	Serbia
2009	Elena Dementieva	Russia
2010	Samantha Stosur	Australia
2011	Caroline Wozniacki	Denmark
2012	Victoria Azarenka	Belarus
2013	Victoria Azarenka (2)	Belarus
2014	Petra Kvitová	Czech Republic
2015	Caroline Wozniacki (2)	Denmark
2016	Simona Halep	Romania
2017	Angelique Kerber	Germany
2018	Elina Svitolina	Ukraine
2019	Kiki Bertens	Netherlands
2020	Not awarded	
2021	Not awarded	
2022	Maria Sakkari	Greece
2023	Jessica Pegula	United States
2024	Aryna Sabalenka	Belarus
2025	Coco Gauff	United States
2026		

== Peachy Kellmeyer Player Service ==
Award named for Peachy Kellmeyer, former player and the first tour director of the fledgling Virginia Slims circuit (precursor of WTA Tour). In 2020, the award was presented to all the members of the WTA Players' Council, as the group "worked diligently discussing proposals and obtaining feedback to help the Tour return safely and successfully, all with a dedicated commitment to their fellow players", following the suspension of the tour due to the COVID-19 pandemic.

Year	Player	Nationality
1977	Jim Bainbridge	United States
1978	Trish Faulkner	Australia
1979	Edy McGoldrick	United States
1980	Diane Desfor	United States
1981	Barbara Jordan	United States
1982	Diane Desfor (2)	United States
1983	Lele Forood	United States
1984	Kim Shaefer	United States
1985	Chris Evert	United States
1986	Marcella Mesker	Netherlands
1987	Chris Evert (2)	United States
1988	Candy Reynolds	United States
1989	Mercedes Paz	Argentina
1990	Wendy Turnbull	Australia
1991	Kathy Jordan	United States
1992	Elise Burgin	United States
1993	Pam Shriver	United States
1994	Marianne Werdel	United States
1995	Marianne Werdel (2)	United States
1996	Katrina Adams	United States
1997	Katrina Adams (2)	United States
1998	Joannette Kruger	South Africa
1999	Nicole Pratt	Australia
2000	Nicole Pratt (2)	Australia
2001	Nicole Pratt (3)	Australia
2002	Not Awarded	
2003	Kim Clijsters	Belgium
2004	Nicole Pratt (4)	Australia
2005	Liezel Huber	United States
2006	Kim Clijsters (2)	Belgium
2007	Liezel Huber (2)	United States
2008	Liezel Huber (3)	United States
2009	Liezel Huber (4)	United States
2010	Kim Clijsters (3)	Belgium
2011	Francesca Schiavone	Italy
2012	Venus Williams	United States
2013	Venus Williams (2)	United States
2014	Lucie Šafářová	Czech Republic
2015	Lucie Šafářová (2)	Czech Republic
2016	Lucie Šafářová (3)	Czech Republic
2017	Lucie Šafářová (4)	Czech Republic
2018	Bethanie Mattek-Sands	United States
2019	Gabriela Dabrowski	Canada
2020	Kristie Ahn; Gabriela Dabrowski (2); Madison Keys; Johanna Konta; Aleksandra Krunić; Christina McHale; Kristina Mladenovic; Anastasia Pavlyuchenkova; Sloane Stephens; Donna Vekić	United States; Canada; United States; United Kingdom; Serbia; United States; France; Russia; United States; Croatia
2021	Kristie Ahn (2)	United States
2022	Gabriela Dabrowski (3)	Canada
2023	Ons Jabeur	Tunisia
2024	Ons Jabeur (2)	Tunisia
2025	Gabriela Dabrowski (4)	Canada
2026		

== Karen Krantzcke Sportsmanship Award ==
Award named for Karen Krantzcke, an Australian player who died of a heart attack whilst jogging, aged 31, on 11 April 1977. Currently this award and only one other award, the Peachy Kellmeyer Player Service, are uniquely given after a vote by fellow players.

Year	Player	Nationality
1978	Evonne Goolagong	Australia
1979	Chris Evert	United States
1980	Evonne Goolagong (2)	Australia
1981	Diane Desfor	United States
1982	Nancy Yeargin	United States
1983	Sharon Walsh-Pete	United States
1984	Marcella Mesker	Netherlands
1985	Peanut Louie-Harper	United States
1986	Peanut Louie-Harper (2)	United States
1987	Anne Minter	Australia
1988	Svetlana Parkhomenko	Soviet Union
1989	Gretchen Magers	United States
1990	Mercedes Paz	Argentina
1991	Judith Wiesner	Austria
1992	Jill Hetherington	Canada
1993	Nicole Arendt	United States
1994	Kimberly Po	United States
1995	Amanda Coetzer	South Africa
1996	Yayuk Basuki	Indonesia
1997	Amanda Coetzer (2)	South Africa
1998	Yayuk Basuki (2)	Indonesia
1999	Ai Sugiyama	Japan
2000	Kim Clijsters	Belgium
2001	Kim Clijsters (2)	Belgium
2002	Kim Clijsters (3)	Belgium
2003	Kim Clijsters (4)	Belgium
2004	Lindsay Davenport	United States
2005	Kim Clijsters (5)	Belgium
2006	Kim Clijsters (6)	Belgium
2007	Ana Ivanovic	Serbia
2008	Elena Dementieva	Russia
2009	Kim Clijsters (7)	Belgium
2010	Elena Dementieva (2)	Russia
2011	Petra Kvitová	Czech Republic
2012	Kim Clijsters (8)	Belgium
2013	Petra Kvitová (2)	Czech Republic
2014	Petra Kvitová (3)	Czech Republic
2015	Petra Kvitová (4)	Czech Republic
2016	Petra Kvitová (5)	Czech Republic
2017	Petra Kvitová (6)	Czech Republic
2018	Petra Kvitová (7)	Czech Republic
2019	Petra Kvitová (8)	Czech Republic
2020	Marie Bouzková	Czech Republic
2021	Carla Suárez Navarro	Spain
2022	Ons Jabeur	Tunisia
2023	Ons Jabeur (2)	Tunisia
2024	Ons Jabeur (3)	Tunisia
2025	Jessica Pegula	United States
2026		

== Georgina Clark Mother Award ==
Year	Player	Nationality
2010	Ann Haydon-Jones	United Kingdom
2011	Judy Tegart-Dalton	Australia
2012	Gladys Heldman	United States
2013	?	
2014	Françoise Durr	France
2015	Ingrid Löfdahl-Bentzer	Sweden
2016	Yulia Berberian-Maleeva	Bulgaria
2017	?	
2018	Evonne Goolagong Cawley	Australia
2019	Chris Evert	United States
2020	?	
2021	Judy Murray	Scotland
2022	Mary Carillo	United States
2023	No award given	
2024	Pam Shriver	United States
2025	Nicole Pratt	Australia
2026		

== WTA Coach of the Year Award ==
Year	Coach	Of player
2018	(Germany) Sascha Bajin	(Japan) Naomi Osaka
2019	(Australia) Craig Tyzzer	(Australia) Ashleigh Barty
2020	(Poland) Piotr Sierzputowski	(Poland) Iga Świątek
2021	(Spain) Conchita Martínez	(Spain) Garbiñe Muguruza
2022	(United States) David Witt	(United States) Jessica Pegula
2023	(Poland) Tomasz Wiktorowski	(Poland) Iga Świątek
2024	(Italy) Renzo Furlan	(Italy) Jasmine Paolini
2025	(Netherlands) Hendrik Vleeshouwers	(United States) Amanda Anisimova
2026		

== See also ==
- ATP Awards
- ITF World Champions
- World number 1 ranked female tennis players
- World number 1 ranked male tennis players
- Tennis statistics
