= 2025 Champaign Challenger – Singles =

Singles
- 2025 Champaign Challenger

Final
- Champion: (United States) Stefan Kozlov
- Runner-up: (United States) Murphy Cassone
- Score: 7–6^{(7–3)}, 7–5

Events
Singles	Doubles
- Champaign Challenger

Ethan Quinn was the defending champion but chose not to defend his title.

Stefan Kozlov won the title after defeating Murphy Cassone 7–6^{(7–3)}, 7–5 in the final.

== Seeds ==
1. (Colombia) Nicolás Mejía (first round)
2. (United Kingdom) Johannus Monday (first round)
3. (United States) Mitchell Krueger (first round)
4. (United States) Murphy Cassone (final)
5. (Germany) Mats Rosenkranz (quarterfinals)
6. (United States) Andres Martin (second round)
7. (Georgia (country)) Saba Purtseladze (first round)
8. (United States) Tyler Zink (second round)

== Draw ==
Key

- Q = Qualifier
- WC = Wild card
- LL = Lucky loser
- Alt = Alternate
- ITF = ITF entry
- PR = Protected ranking
- SR = Special ranking
- SE = Special exempt
- JE = Junior exempt
- JR = Junior Accelerator Programme entrant
- CO = College Accelerator Programme entrant
- NG = Next Gen Accelerator Program entrant
- w/o = Walkover
- r = Retired
- d = Defaulted

=== Finals ===
Semifinals
(Germany) Cedrik-Marcel Stebe	0	0^{r}
(United States) Stefan Kozlov	6	4
4	(United States) Murphy Cassone	6	2	6
(Japan) Kenta Miyoshi	2	6	4

Final
(United States) Stefan Kozlov	7^{7}	7
4	(United States) Murphy Cassone	6^{3}	5

=== Top half ===
First round
1	(Colombia) N Mejía	6^{5}	3
(Germany) C-M Stebe	7^{7}	6
(United States) A Perez	4	7	3
(Japan) J Friend	6	5	6
(United States) K Smith	4	2
WC	(Hungary) Ádám Jilly	6	6
(Spain) Àlex Martínez	7	3	7^{9}
7	(Georgia (country)) S Purtseladze	5	6	6^{7}
3	(United States) M Krueger	3	6^{5}
(United States) Dar Blanch	6	7^{7}
Q	(United Kingdom) L Maxted	3	4
(Turkey) A Azkara	6	6
(United States) S Kozlov	6	6
(Sweden) L Borg	1	0
Q	(Japan) S Mitsui	6^{5}	1
8	(United States) T Zink	7^{7}	6

Second round
(Germany) C-M Stebe	7^{8}	7
(Japan) J Friend	6^{6}	5
WC	(Hungary) Á Jilly	3	2
(Spain) À Martínez	6	6
(United States) Dar Blanch	6	6
(Turkey) A Azkara	3	4
(United States) S Kozlov	6	6
8	(United States) T Zink	3	3

Quarterfinals
(Germany) C-M Stebe	3	6	7
(Spain) À Martínez	6	3	5
(United States) Dar Blanch	2	7^{9}	3
(United States) S Kozlov	6	6^{7}	6

Semifinals
(Germany) C-M Stebe	0	0^{r}
(United States) S Kozlov	6	4

=== Bottom half ===
First round
5	(Germany) M Rosenkranz	6	6
Q	(Spain) Pablo Martínez Gómez	3	3
WC	(United Kingdom) Oliver Okonkwo	3	5
Alt	(United States) A Ganesan	6	7
(United Kingdom) A McHugh	6^{5}	6	7
Q	(Australia) Jeremy Zhang	7^{7}	3	5
JR	(South Korea) Roh Ho-young	0	2
4	(United States) M Cassone	6	6
6	(United States) A Martin	6	7^{7}
Q	(United States) Ryan Fishback	3	6^{4}
WC	(France) Sasha Colleu	2	7^{7}	1
Q	(Germany) Taym Al Azmeh	6	6^{5}	6
(Japan) Kenta Miyoshi	6	7
LL	(United States) Q Vandecasteele	3	5
PR	(United States) Micah Braswell	7^{10}	6
2	(United Kingdom) J Monday	6^{8}	4

Second round
5	(Germany) M Rosenkranz	6	6
Alt	(United States) A Ganesan	1	2
(United Kingdom) A McHugh	6	6^{0}	3
4	(United States) M Cassone	1	7^{7}	6
6	(United States) A Martin	4	5
Q	(Germany) T Al Azmeh	6	7
(Japan) K Miyoshi	2	6	6
PR	(United States) M Braswell	6	0	3

Quarterfinals
5	(Germany) M Rosenkranz	6^{4}	3
4	(United States) M Cassone	7^{7}	6
Q	(Germany) T Al Azmeh	5	2
(Japan) K Miyoshi	7	6

Semifinals
4	(United States) M Cassone	6	2	6
(Japan) K Miyoshi	2	6	4
