= 2024 Calgary National Bank Challenger – Women's doubles =

Women's doubles
- 2024 Calgary National Bank Challenger

Final
- Champions: (Canada) Kayla Cross (United States) Maribella Zamarripa
- Runners-up: (United States) Robin Anderson (United States) Dalayna Hewitt
- Score: 6–7^{(3–7)}, 7–5, [12–10]

Events
Singles	men	women
Doubles	men	women
- Calgary Challenger

Sarah Beth Grey and Eden Silva were the defending champions, but Silva chose to compete in Osaka and Grey chose to play in Shrewsbury.

Kayla Cross and Maribella Zamarripa won the title, defeating Robin Anderson and Dalayna Hewitt in the final, 6–7^{(3–7)}, 7–5, [12–10].

== Seeds ==
1. (Belgium) Magali Kempen / (Belgium) Lara Salden (first round)
2. (United States) Jessica Failla / (United States) Anna Rogers (quarterfinals)
3. (Canada) Ariana Arseneault / (Canada) Mia Kupres (withdrew)
4. (Lithuania) Justina Mikulskytė / (United States) Christina Rosca (first round)

== Draw ==
Key

- Q = Qualifier
- WC = Wild card
- LL = Lucky loser
- Alt = Alternate
- ITF = ITF entry
- PR = Protected ranking
- SR = Special ranking
- SE = Special exempt
- JE = Junior exempt
- JR = Junior Accelerator Programme entrant
- CO = College Accelerator Programme entrant
- NG = Next Gen Accelerator Program entrant
- w/o = Walkover
- r = Retired
- d = Defaulted

=== Draw ===
First round
1	(Belgium) M Kempen (Belgium) L Salden	3	4
(United States) R Anderson (United States) D Hewitt	6	6
WC	(Canada) R Lacasse (Romania) G Lee	6^{2}	6	[9]
(Croatia) L Ćirić Bagarić (Switzerland) J Dürst	7^{7}	1	[11]
4	(Lithuania) J Mikulskytė (United States) C Rosca	3	6	[5]
(France) J Belgraver (Netherlands) J Gimbrère	6	3	[10]
(Poland) U Radwańska (Belgium) C Vlasselaer	4	2
(Slovakia) V Hrunčáková (Czech Republic) G Knutson	6	6
(Canada) K Cross (United States) M Zamarripa	7	6
(Canada) I Boulais (United States) A Zhu	5	4
WC	(United States) A Frey (Canada) A Jacobs
Alt	(United States) F Crawley (United States) K Miller	w/o
Alt	(Japan) A Koshiishi (Netherlands) D Tran	6	6^{3}	[14]
(Canada) C Brace (United States) J Loeb	2	7^{7}	[16]
WC	(Canada) GV Lindgren (Canada) S Stanton	2	1
2	(United States) J Failla (United States) A Rogers	6	6

Quarterfinals
(United States) R Anderson (United States) D Hewitt	6	6
(Croatia) L Ćirić Bagarić (Switzerland) J Dürst	4	1
(France) J Belgraver (Netherlands) J Gimbrère	1	6	[7]
(Slovakia) V Hrunčáková (Czech Republic) G Knutson	6	4	[10]
(Canada) K Cross (United States) M Zamarripa	7^{7}	6
Alt	(United States) F Crawley (United States) K Miller	6^{3}	1
(Canada) C Brace (United States) J Loeb	6	6
2	(United States) J Failla (United States) A Rogers	2	3

Semifinals
(United States) R Anderson (United States) D Hewitt	2	7^{7}	[10]
(Slovakia) V Hrunčáková (Czech Republic) G Knutson	6	6^{5}	[8]
(Canada) K Cross (United States) M Zamarripa	6	6
(Canada) C Brace (United States) J Loeb	3	2

Final
(United States) R Anderson (United States) D Hewitt	7^{7}	5	[10]
(Canada) K Cross (United States) M Zamarripa	6^{3}	7	[12]
