= Murphy Cassone =

American tennis player (born 2002)

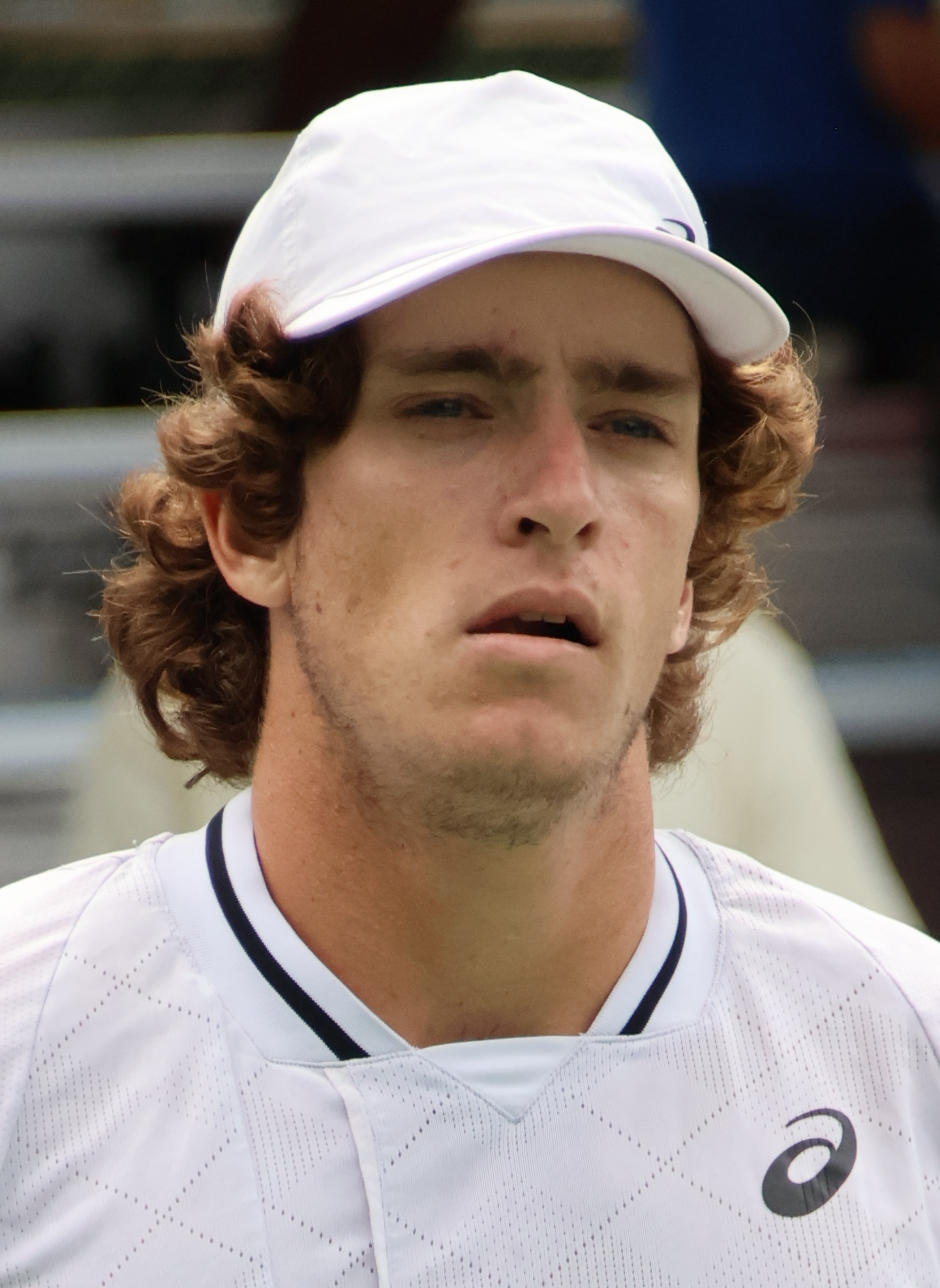
- Cassone at the 2025 Washington Open
- Country (sports): United States
- Born: August 16, 2002 (age 24) Overland Park, Kansas, U.S.
- Height: 6 ft 2 in (1.88 m)
- Turned pro: 2019
- Plays: Right-handed (two-handed backhand)
- College: Arizona State
- Coach: Piotr Sierzputowski
- Prize money: US $346,914

Singles
- Career record: 0–2
- Career titles: 1 Challenger
- Highest ranking: No. 172 (August 18, 2025)
- Current ranking: No. 307 (August 31, 2026)

Grand Slam singles results
- Australian Open: Q2 (2026)
- French Open: Q1 (2025)
- Wimbledon: Q1 (2025)
- US Open: Q2 (2025)

Doubles
- Career record: 0–0
- Highest ranking: No. 1.645 (April 3, 2023)
- Last updated on: September 1, 2026.

Murphy Cassone (born August 16, 2002) is an American professional tennis player. He has a career high ATP singles ranking of world No. 172 achieved on August 18, 2025.

== College career ==
Cassone played college tennis at Arizona State.

== Professional career ==
=== 2024: Maiden Challenger title ===
Cassone won his maiden ATP Challenger singles title at the 2024 Calgary National Bank Challenger. The following week he reached the semifinals at the 2024 Sioux Falls Challenger using a special exempt.

=== 2025: ATP Tour and top 200 debuts ===
In July, Cassone made his ATP Tour debut as a qualifier at the Washington Open. He lost to Reilly Opelka in the first round.

In November, Cassone reached his second Challenger final at the Champaign Challenger, losing to Stefan Kozlov in the final.

== Performance timeline ==
Key
W	F	SF	QF	#R	RR	Q#	DNQ	A	NH

(W) winner; (F) finalist; (SF) semifinalist; (QF) quarterfinalist; (#R) rounds 4, 3, 2, 1; (RR) round-robin stage; (Q#) qualification round; (DNQ) did not qualify; (A) absent; (NH) not held; (SR) strike rate (events won / competed); (W–L) win–loss record.

=== Singles ===
Tournament	2022	2023	2024	2025	2026	SR	W–L	Win%
Grand Slam tournaments
Australian Open	A	A	A	A	Q2	0 / 0	0–0	–
French Open	A	A	A	Q1	A	0 / 0	0–0	–
Wimbledon	A	A	A	Q1	A	0 / 0	0–0	–
US Open	Q1	A	A	Q2		0 / 0	0–0	–
Win–loss	0–0	0–0	0–0	0–0	0–0	0 / 0	0–0	–
ATP Tour Masters 1000
Indian Wells Masters	A	A	A	A	A	0 / 0	0–0	–
Miami Open	A	A	A	A	Q2	0 / 0	0–0	–
Monte-Carlo Masters	A	A	A	A		0 / 0	0–0	–
Madrid Open	A	A	A	A		0 / 0	0–0	–
Italian Open	A	A	A	A		0 / 0	0–0	–
Canadian Open	A	A	A	A		0 / 0	0–0	–
Cincinnati Open	A	A	A	A		0 / 0	0–0	–
Shanghai Masters	NH	A	A	A		0 / 0	0–0	–
Paris Masters	A	A	A	A		0 / 0	0–0	–
Win–loss	0-0	0–0	0–0	0–0	0–0	0 / 0	0–0	–

== ATP Challenger Tour finals ==
=== Singles: 2 (1 title, 1 runner-up) ===
Legend ATP Challenger Tour (1–1)

Result	W–L	Date	Tournament	Tier	Surface	Opponent	Score
Win	1–0	Oct 2024	Calgary, Canada	Challenger	Hard (i)	(United States) Govind Nanda	4–6, 6–3, 6–4
Loss	1–1	Nov 2025	Champaign, United States	Challenger	Hard (i)	(United States) Stefan Kozlov	6–7^{(3–7)}, 5–7
