= 2024 Calgary National Bank Challenger – Men's singles =

Men's singles
- 2024 Calgary National Bank Challenger

Final
- Champion: (United States) Murphy Cassone
- Runner-up: (United States) Govind Nanda
- Score: 4–6, 6–3, 6–4

Events
Singles	men	women
Doubles	men	women
- Calgary National Bank Challenger

Liam Draxl was the defending champion but lost in the semifinals to Govind Nanda.

Murphy Cassone won the title after defeating Nanda 4–6, 6–3, 6–4 in the final.

== Seeds ==
1. (Poland) Maks Kaśnikowski (quarterfinals)
2. (United States) Patrick Kypson (second round)
3. (Tunisia) Aziz Dougaz (semifinals)
4. (Australia) Bernard Tomic (quarterfinals)
5. (Colombia) Nicolás Mejía (quarterfinals)
6. (Canada) Alexis Galarneau (quarterfinals)
7. (Canada) Liam Draxl (semifinals)
8. (Japan) James Trotter (second round)

== Draw ==
Key

- Q = Qualifier
- WC = Wild card
- LL = Lucky loser
- Alt = Alternate
- ITF = ITF entry
- PR = Protected ranking
- SR = Special ranking
- SE = Special exempt
- JE = Junior exempt
- JR = Junior Accelerator Programme entrant
- CO = College Accelerator Programme entrant
- NG = Next Gen Accelerator Program entrant
- w/o = Walkover
- r = Retired
- d = Defaulted

=== Finals ===
Semifinals
Q	(United States) Govind Nanda	6	6
7	(Canada) Liam Draxl	2	4
3	(Tunisia) Aziz Dougaz	5	4
Q	(United States) Murphy Cassone	7	6

Final
Q	(United States) Govind Nanda	6	3	4
Q	(United States) Murphy Cassone	4	6	6

=== Top half ===
First round
1	(Poland) M Kaśnikowski	6	6
(Turkey) C İlkel	3	3
(United States) A Martin	7^{7}	4	6
Q	(Spain) Àlex Martínez	6^{4}	6	3
(Germany) T Handel	4	2
Q	(United States) G Nanda	6	6
(Croatia) B Gojo	7	4	4
8	(Japan) J Trotter	5	6	6
4	(Australia) B Tomic	6	7^{7}
Q	(United States) Patrick Maloney	4	6^{3}
Q	(Canada) Benjamin Thomas George	4	5
(United States) Andre Ilagan	6	7
WC	(Canada) J Boulais	6^{2}	6	4
(Germany) L Wessels	7^{7}	2	6
(Venezuela) G Oliveira	1	7^{7}	4
7	(Canada) L Draxl	6	6^{2}	6

Second round
1	(Poland) M Kaśnikowski	6	6
(United States) A Martin	4	4
Q	(United States) G Nanda	3	6	6
8	(Japan) J Trotter	6	4	2
4	(Australia) B Tomic	6	6
(United States) A Ilagan	3	2
(Germany) L Wessels	6^{4}	1
7	(Canada) L Draxl	7^{7}	6

Quarterfinals
1	(Poland) M Kaśnikowski	6^{5}	7^{7}	5
Q	(United States) G Nanda	7^{7}	6^{5}	7
4	(Australia) B Tomic	4	6	1
7	(Canada) L Draxl	6	4	6

Semifinals
Q	(United States) G Nanda	6	6
7	(Canada) L Draxl	2	4

=== Bottom half ===
First round
5	(Colombia) N Mejía	6	7^{7}
(United States) B Kuzuhara	4	6^{0}
(New Zealand) K Pannu	1	5
(Mexico) E Escobedo	6	7
WC	(Canada) C Harper	4	6^{3}
(United States) A Mayo	6	7^{7}
(Germany) M Wiskandt	3	7^{7}	2
3	(Tunisia) A Dougaz	6	6^{5}	6
6	(Canada) A Galarneau	6	6
(Romania) GA Boitan	4	3
Q	(United States) A Perez	6^{4}	6	3
WC	(Canada) V Pospisil	7^{7}	4	6
(United States) R Seggerman	6	6^{4}	6^{13}
Q	(United States) M Cassone	3	7^{7}	7^{15}
(Dominican Republic) R Cid Subervi	5	1
2	(United States) P Kypson	7	6

Second round
5	(Colombia) N Mejía	7^{7}	6
(Mexico) E Escobedo	6^{1}	1
(United States) A Mayo	4	4
3	(Tunisia) A Dougaz	6	6
6	(Canada) A Galarneau	7	6
WC	(Canada) V Pospisil	5	2
Q	(United States) M Cassone	6	6
2	(United States) P Kypson	2	4

Quarterfinals
5	(Colombia) N Mejía	1	4
3	(Tunisia) A Dougaz	6	6
6	(Canada) A Galarneau	7^{9}	6^{2}	6^{4}
Q	(United States) M Cassone	6^{7}	7^{7}	7^{7}

Semifinals
3	(Tunisia) A Dougaz	5	4
Q	(United States) M Cassone	7	6
