= 2025 Champaign Challenger – Doubles =

Doubles
- 2025 Champaign Challenger

Final
- Champions: (Australia) Patrick Harper (Japan) Shunsuke Mitsui
- Runners-up: (United States) Ryan Seggerman (United States) Keegan Smith
- Score: 7–5, 6–7^{(3–7)}, [12–10]

Events
Singles	Doubles
- Champaign Challenger

Evan King and Reese Stalder were the defending champions but chose not to defend their title.

Patrick Harper and Shunsuke Mitsui won the title after defeating Ryan Seggerman and Keegan Smith 7–5, 6–7^{(3–7)}, [12–10] in the final.

== Seeds ==
1. (United Kingdom) Scott Duncan / (United Kingdom) James MacKinlay (semifinals)
2. (United States) Pranav Kumar / (United States) Noah Schachter (first round)
3. (United States) Alfredo Perez / (United States) Jamie Vance (first round)
4. (United Kingdom) Tom Hands / (Germany) Mats Rosenkranz (first round)

== Draw ==
Key

- Q = Qualifier
- WC = Wild card
- LL = Lucky loser
- Alt = Alternate
- ITF = ITF entry
- PR = Protected ranking
- SR = Special ranking
- SE = Special exempt
- JE = Junior exempt
- JR = Junior Accelerator Programme entrant
- CO = College Accelerator Programme entrant
- NG = Next Gen Accelerator Program entrant
- w/o = Walkover
- r = Retired
- d = Defaulted

First round
1	(United Kingdom) S Duncan (United Kingdom) J MacKinlay	6	6
(Ghana) I Nortey (United States) Leonardo Vega	2	1
(Japan) Kenta Miyoshi (United Kingdom) Oliver Okonkwo	6	7
WC	(France) Sasha Colleu (Hungary) Ádám Jilly	2	5
4	(United Kingdom) T Hands (Germany) M Rosenkranz	4	5
(Turkey) A Azkara (United Kingdom) James Hopper	6	7
(United Kingdom) L Maxted (United Kingdom) Joe Tyler	4	4
(United States) R Seggerman (United States) K Smith	6	6
(United States) S Kozlov (Venezuela) B Pérez	6	3	[5]
(Australia) P Harper (Japan) S Mitsui	4	6	[10]
WC	(France) Mathis Debru (Australia) Jeremy Zhang	7^{7}	7^{7}
3	(United States) A Perez (United States) Jamie Vance	6^{5}	6^{3}
Alt	(United States) Ryan Fishback (United States) Noah Zamora	6	7^{7}
(United States) Zachary Fuchs (United States) Wally Thayne	4	6^{3}
(Bulgaria) A Genov (United States) Enzo Wallart	7^{7}	0	[10]
2	(United States) P Kumar (United States) N Schachter	6^{3}	6	[5]

Quarterfinals
1	(United Kingdom) S Duncan (United Kingdom) J MacKinlay	6	3	[11]
(Japan) K Miyoshi (United Kingdom) O Okonkwo	1	6	[9]
(Turkey) A Azkara (United Kingdom) J Hopper	3	4
(United States) R Seggerman (United States) K Smith	6	6
(Australia) P Harper (Japan) S Mitsui	6	6
WC	(France) M Debru (Australia) J Zhang	3	2
Alt	(United States) R Fishback (United States) N Zamora	7^{7}	6
(Bulgaria) A Genov (United States) E Wallart	6^{2}	2

Semifinals
1	(United Kingdom) S Duncan (United Kingdom) J MacKinlay	5	7^{7}	[4]
(United States) R Seggerman (United States) K Smith	7	6^{5}	[10]
(Australia) P Harper (Japan) S Mitsui	6	5	[10]
Alt	(United States) R Fishback (United States) N Zamora	4	7	[3]

Final
(United States) R Seggerman (United States) K Smith	5	7^{7}	[10]
(Australia) P Harper (Japan) S Mitsui	7	6^{3}	[12]
