= 2025 Los Cabos Open – Doubles =

Doubles
- 2025 Los Cabos Open

Final
- Champions: (United States) Robert Cash (United States) JJ Tracy
- Runners-up: (Australia) Blake Bayldon (Australia) Tristan Schoolkate
- Score: 7–6^{(7–4)}, 6–4

Events
Singles	Doubles
← 2024 ·	Los Cabos Open	· 2026 →

Robert Cash and JJ Tracy defeated Blake Bayldon and Tristan Schoolkate in the final, 7–6^{(7–4)}, 6–4 to win the doubles tennis title at the 2025 Los Cabos Open. It was the first ATP Tour title for both players.

Max Purcell and Jordan Thompson were the reigning champions, but Purcell was serving a suspension for an anti-doping violation and Thompson chose not to compete this year.

== Seeds ==
1. (France) Sadio Doumbia / (France) Fabien Reboul (first round)
2. (United States) Christian Harrison / (United States) Rajeev Ram (quarterfinals)
3. (United States) Nathaniel Lammons / (United States) Jackson Withrow (first round)
4. (Australia) Matthew Ebden / (Australia) John Peers (quarterfinals)

== Draw ==
=== Key ===
- Q = Qualifier
- WC = Wild card
- LL = Lucky loser
- Alt = Alternate
- ITF = ITF entry
- PR = Protected ranking
- SR = Special ranking
- SE = Special exempt
- JE = Junior exempt
- JR = Junior Accelerator Programme entrant
- CO = College Accelerator Programme entrant
- NG = Next Gen Accelerator Program entrant
- w/o = Walkover
- r = Retired
- d = Defaulted

=== Draw ===
First round
1	(France) S Doumbia (France) F Reboul	4	3
(India) A Chandrasekar (United States) R Stalder	6	6
WC	(Mexico) M Sánchez (Australia) B Tomic	7^{7}	4
(Mexico) H Hach Verdugo (Colombia) C Rodríguez	6^{3}	1^{r}
3	(United States) N Lammons (United States) J Withrow	6^{5}	3
(Australia) J Duckworth (Australia) A Walton	7^{7}	6
(Australia) B Bayldon (Australia) T Schoolkate	7	6^{4}	[10]
(United Kingdom) J Paris (Japan) T Yuzuki	5	7^{7}	[7]
(Mexico) S González (United States) A Krajicek	6	6
(United States) J Cerretani (United States) T Winegar	2	2
WC	(Colombia) N Mejía (Mexico) R Pacheco Méndez	4	0^{r}
4	(Australia) M Ebden (Australia) J Peers	6	2
(Brazil) F Romboli (Australia) J-P Smith	6	5	[6]
(United States) R Cash (United States) JJ Tracy	3	7	[10]
(India) N Kaliyanda Poonacha (India) J Nedunchezhiyan	4	3
2	(United States) C Harrison (United States) R Ram	6	6

Quarterfinals
(India) A Chandrasekar (United States) R Stalder	7	6
WC	(Mexico) M Sánchez (Australia) B Tomic	5	1
(Australia) J Duckworth (Australia) A Walton
(Australia) B Bayldon (Australia) T Schoolkate	w/o
(Mexico) S González (United States) A Krajicek	2	6	[10]
4	(Australia) M Ebden (Australia) J Peers	6	3	[7]
(United States) R Cash (United States) JJ Tracy	4	6	[10]
2	(United States) C Harrison (United States) R Ram	6	4	[6]

Semifinals
(India) A Chandrasekar (United States) R Stalder	6	1	[9]
(Australia) B Bayldon (Australia) T Schoolkate	1	6	[11]
(Mexico) S González (United States) A Krajicek	4	6	[5]
(United States) R Cash (United States) JJ Tracy	6	2	[10]

Final
(Australia) B Bayldon (Australia) T Schoolkate	6^{4}	4
(United States) R Cash (United States) JJ Tracy	7^{7}	6
