= Nowy Dwór Gdański =

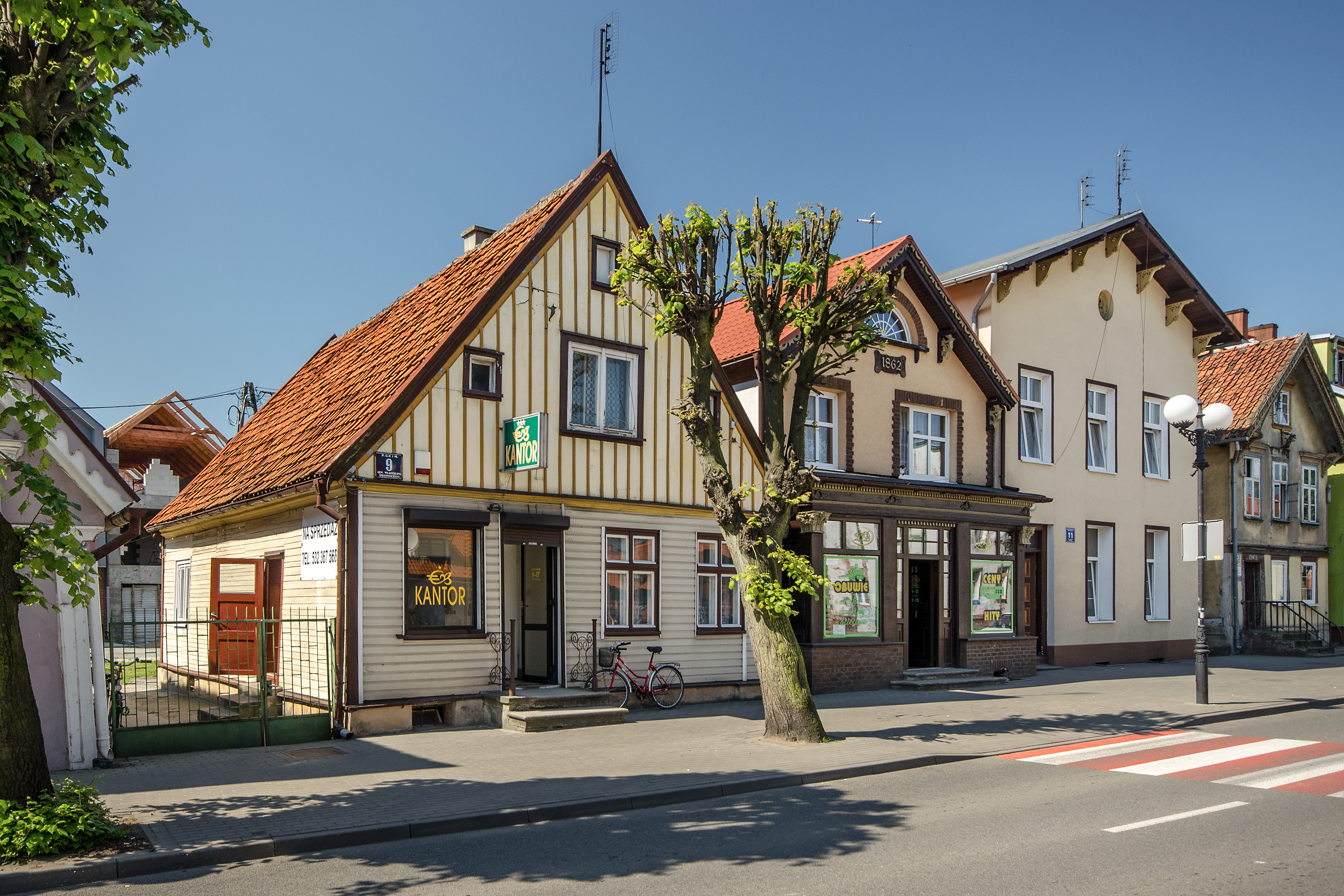
- Preserved old houses at Sikorskiego Street

- Flag Coat of arms
- Interactive map of Nowy Dwór Gdański
- Location within Poland
- Coordinates: 54°13′N 19°7′E
- Country: Poland
- Voivodeship: Pomeranian
- County: Nowy Dwór
- Gmina: Nowy Dwór Gdański
- Established: 1570

Area
  - Total: 5.06 km^{2} (1.95 sq mi)

Population (2012)
  - Total: 10,171
  - Density: 2,010/km^{2} (5,210/sq mi)
- Time zone: UTC+1 (CET)
  - Summer (DST): UTC+2 (CEST)
- Postal code: 82-100
- Climate: Cfb
- Website: http://www.miastonowydwor.pl/

Nowy Dwór Gdański (Polish: [ˈnɔvɨ dvur ˈɡdaj̃skʲi]; Kashubian: Nowi Dwór; formerly German: Tiegenhof) is a town in Poland on the Tuja river in the Żuławy Wiślane region, capital of Nowy Dwór County, located in Pomeranian Voivodeship, with 10,171 inhabitants (2012).

== History ==
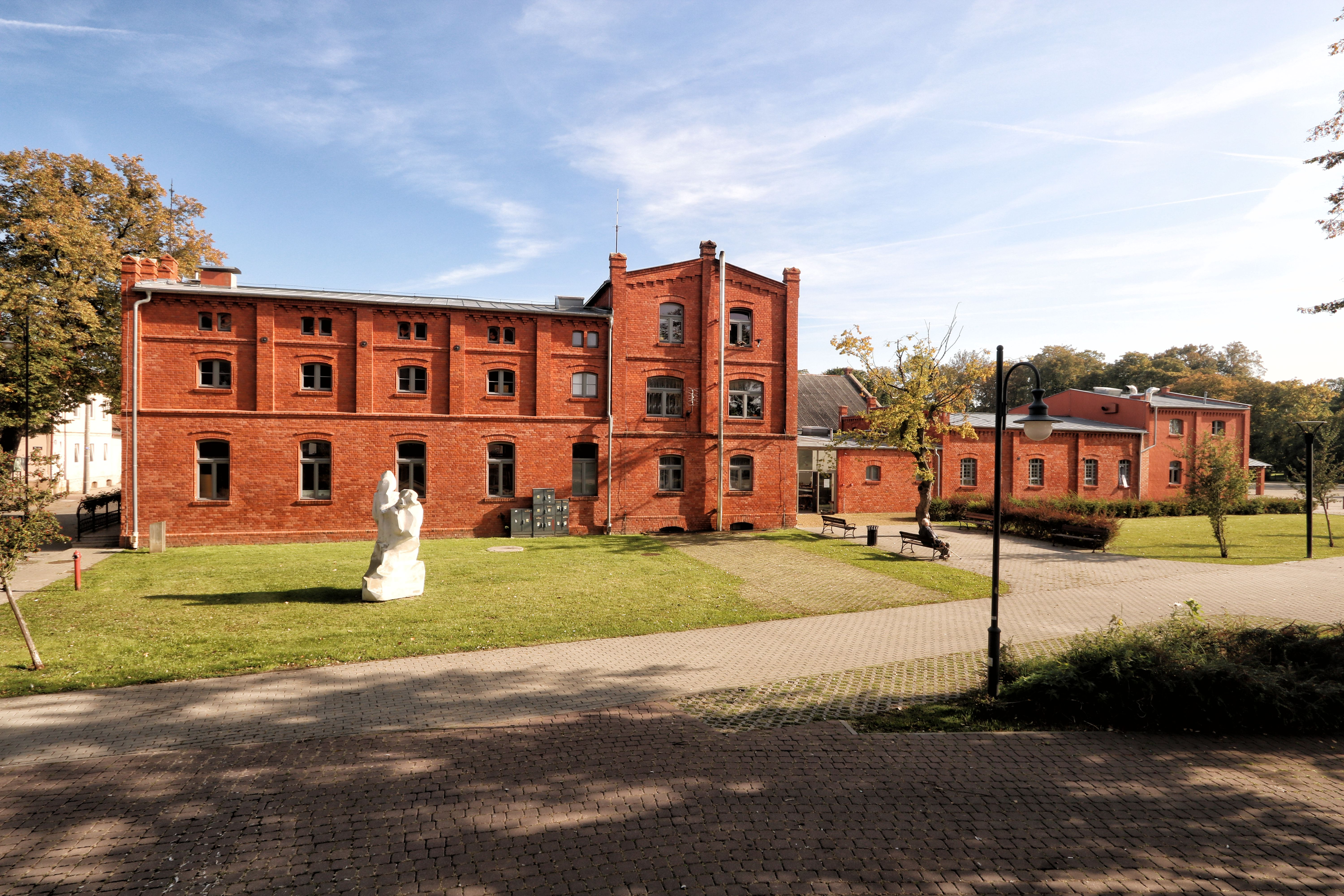
Żuławy Historical Park (Żuławski Park Historyczny)

The settlement was established in 1570. Initially owned by the Loitz family, it was later governed by the Wejher and Sobieski noble families, including King of Poland John III Sobieski. Administratively it was part of the Malbork Voivodeship within the Polish Crown. As a result of the First Partition of Poland in 1772 it was annexed by Prussia, in 1871 it became part of Germany. In 1920 it became part of the Free City of Danzig (Gdańsk).

On September 1, 1939, the day Germany invaded Poland, causing World War II, the Germans murdered the local Polish customs inspector. The town was then annexed by Nazi Germany. During the war, a subcamp of the Stutthof concentration camp was operated by the Germans in the town. One of the places where the Germans used the forced labour of Stutthof prisoners was the train station, where there is now a memorial plaque. After the defeat of Nazi Germany in the war in 1945, the town again became part of Poland.

== Notable residents ==
- Krzysztof Pilarz (born 1980), professional goalkeeper
- Piotr Sierzputowski (born 1992), tennis coach

== International relations ==
Nowy Dwór Gdański is twinned with:

- Hennef (Sieg), Germany – since 2001
- Sarny, Ukraine
- Svetly, Kaliningrad Oblast, Russia
- Velká nad Veličkou, Czech Republic
