= Piotr Sierzputowski =

Polish tennis coach

- Country (sports): Poland
- Born: 21 September 1992 (age 32); Nowy Dwór Gdański, Pomerania, Poland

Coaching career
- Iga Świątek (2016–2021); Shelby Rogers (2022–2024)

Coaching achievements
- Coachee singles titles total: 3
- List of notable tournaments (with champion) 2020 French Open (Świątek)

Piotr Sierzputowski (Polish pronunciation: [ˈpjɔtr ɕɛʐpuˈtɔfskʲi]; born 21 September 1992) is a Polish tennis coach best known for coaching the Women's Tennis Association (WTA) player Iga Świątek from 2016 to 2021.

== Career ==
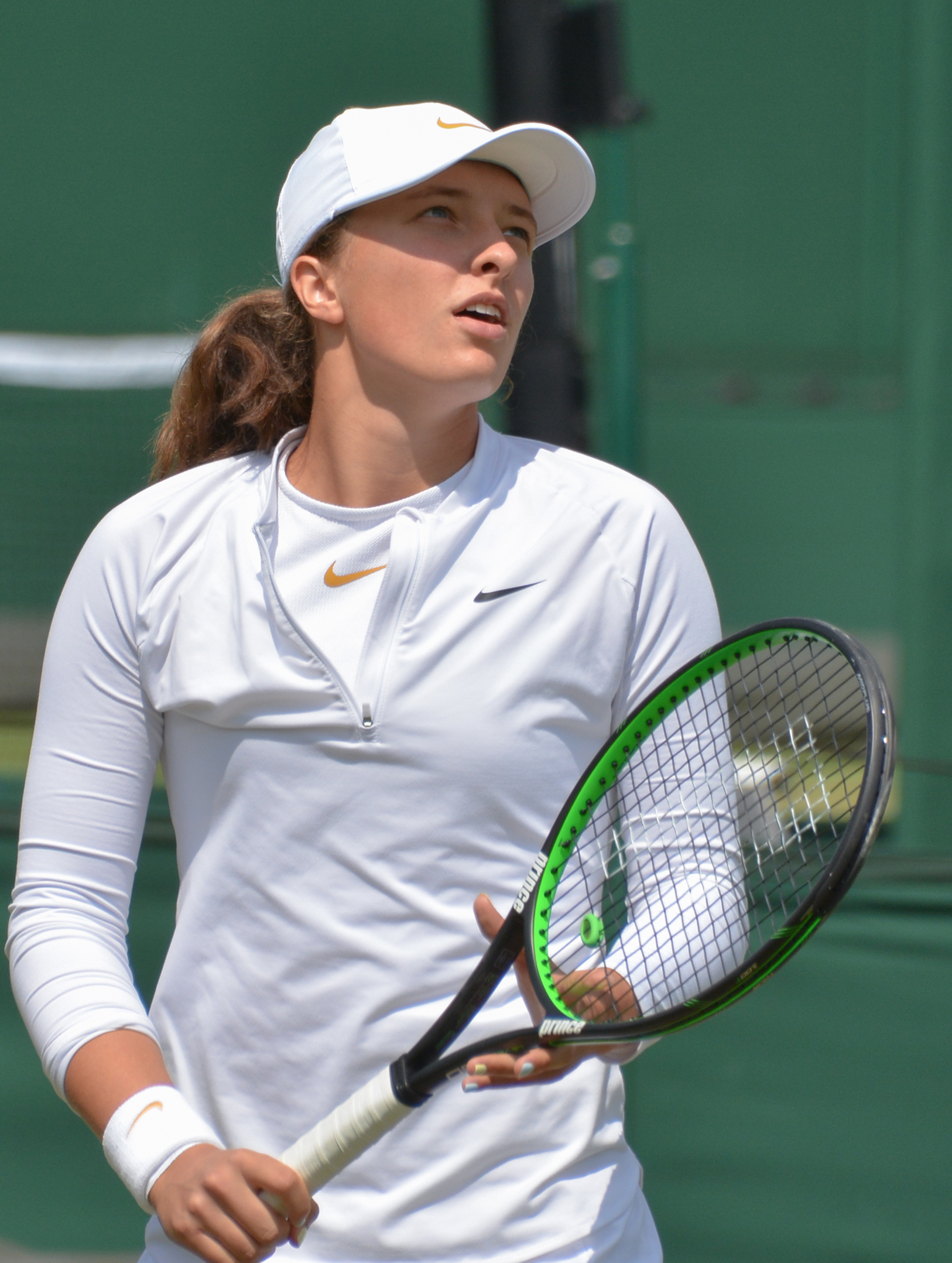
17-year-old Iga Świątek at Wimbledon in 2018

Born in Nowy Dwór Gdański, Sierzputowski is a former junior tennis player who took up coaching in his early teens, helping to train his younger sister, Alicja Sierzputowska, though he soon also coached other girls professionally at a local tennis club in Pomerania. While supporting his sister's career, he spent some time working in the United States with her and other players, including at the Johan Kriek Tennis Academy, before moving back to Poland to be an assistant coach at Legia Warsaw's tennis club.

In mid-2016, on the back of reaching a junior French Open quarterfinal, then-15-year-old Iga Świątek began working with Sierzputowski, then 23, at Legia Warsaw. Within a couple months, Sierzputowski became her primary coach and she his only student. Świątek had a successful junior career under Sierzputowski, culminating in 2018 when she won the Wimbledon girls' singles title and the French Open girls' and Youth Olympics doubles titles. When Świątek began playing main WTA Tour events in 2019, Sierzputowski formed her core travel team along with sports psychologist Daria Abramowicz and eventually fitness trainer Maciej Ryszczuk.

Świątek was quickly successful on the WTA Tour—in 2020, she made a surprise run at the French Open to claim her first major title, at age 19. She was named the WTA's Most Improved Player and Fan Favorite of 2020, and Sierzputowski won the WTA Coach of the Year Award. Sierzputowski has said, of his coaching style, "I give Iga a lot of space. I can guide her so that she really wants to get better". Świątek established herself further in 2021, winning titles in Adelaide and Rome and getting to a then-high ranking of No. 4. She was also the only woman to reach the fourth round of every major that year and qualified for the WTA Finals for the first time. However, in the off-season before 2022, she and Sierzputowski split amicably due to "burnout" after six years together, wishing each other well on social media; he was replaced by Tomasz Wiktorowski.

In early 2022, Sierzputowski began working as a tennis commentator on Eurosport Polska, including for some of Świątek's matches. He also became the coach of American top 50 player Shelby Rogers.

== Awards ==
- WTA Coach of the Year (2020)
- Przegląd Sportowy Polish Coach of the Year (2020)
