= 2024 Calgary National Bank Challenger =

- Date: 14–20 October
- Edition: 5th (men); 3rd (women)
- Category: ATP Challenger Tour; ITF Women's World Tennis Tour
- Surface: Hard / Indoor
- Location: Calgary, Canada

Champions

Men's singles
- (United States) Murphy Cassone

Women's singles
- (Canada) Rebecca Marino

Men's doubles
- (United States) Ryan Seggerman / (United States) Patrik Trhac

Women's doubles
- (Canada) Kayla Cross / (United States) Maribella Zamarripa
- Calgary Challenger

The 2024 Calgary National Bank Challenger was a professional tennis tournament played on indoor hard courts. It was the fifth edition of the tournament which was part of the 2024 ATP Challenger Tour and the third edition of the tournament which was part of the 2024 ITF Women's World Tennis Tour. It took place in Calgary, Canada between 14 and 20 October 2024.

== Champions ==
=== Men's singles ===
- (United States) Murphy Cassone def. (United States) Govind Nanda 4–6, 6–3, 6–4.

=== Women's singles ===
- (Canada) Rebecca Marino def. (United States) Anna Rogers 7–5, 6–4

=== Men's doubles ===
- (United States) Ryan Seggerman / (United States) Patrik Trhac def. (United States) Robert Cash / (United States) JJ Tracy 6–3, 7–6^{(7–3)}.

=== Women's doubles ===
- (Canada) Kayla Cross / (United States) Maribella Zamarripa def. (United States) Robin Anderson / (United States) Dalayna Hewitt 6–7^{(3–7)}, 7–5, [12–10]

== Men's singles main draw entrants ==
=== Seeds ===
Country	Player	Rank^{1}	Seed
POL	Maks Kaśnikowski	174	1
USA	Patrick Kypson	184	2
TUN	Aziz Dougaz	220	3
AUS	Bernard Tomic	233	4
COL	Nicolás Mejía	240	5
CAN	Alexis Galarneau	249	6
CAN	Liam Draxl	259	7
JPN	James Trotter	260	8

- ^{1} Rankings are as of 30 September 2024.

=== Other entrants ===
The following players received wildcards into the singles main draw:

- (Canada) Justin Boulais
- (Canada) Cleeve Harper
- (Canada) Vasek Pospisil

The following players received entry from the qualifying draw:

- (United States) Murphy Cassone
- (Canada) Benjamin Thomas George
- (United States) Patrick Maloney
- (Spain) Àlex Martínez
- (United States) Govind Nanda
- (United States) Alfredo Perez

== Women's singles main draw entrants ==
=== Seeds ===
Country	Player	Rank^{1}	Seed
GER	Tatjana Maria	93	1
CAN	Rebecca Marino	136	2
CZE	Gabriela Knutson	179	3
CRO	Lucija Ćirić Bagarić	204	4
USA	Maria Mateas	214	5
LTU	Justina Mikulskytė	223	6
NED	Anouk Koevermans	234	7
USA	Robin Anderson	257	8

- ^{1} Rankings are as of 07 October 2024.

=== Other entrants ===
The following players received wildcards into the singles main draw:

- (Canada) Cadence Brace
- (Canada) Isabelle Boulais
- (Canada) Alexia Jacobs
- (Canada) Mia Kupres

The following player received entry into the main draw as a special exempt:

- (France) Julie Belgraver

The following player received entry into the singles main draw using a special ranking:

- (United States) Usue Maitane Arconada

The following players received entry from the qualifying draw:

- (United States) Fiona Crawley
- (Switzerland) Jenny Dürst
- (United States) Jessica Failla
- (Japan) Ayumi Koshiishi
- (United States) Karina Miller
- (Poland) Urszula Radwańska
- (United States) Anna Rogers
- (United States) Amy Zhu
