= 2025 Champaign Challenger =

- Date: 10 – 16 November
- Edition: 29th
- Surface: Hard (indoor)
- Location: Champaign, Illinois, United States

Champions

Singles
- (United States) Stefan Kozlov

Doubles
- (Australia) Patrick Harper / (Japan) Shunsuke Mitsui
- Champaign Challenger

The 2025 Paine Schwartz Partners Champaign Challenger was a professional tennis tournament played on hardcourts. It was the 29th edition of the tournament which was part of the 2025 ATP Challenger Tour. It took place in Champaign, Illinois, United States between November 10 and November 16, 2025.

== Singles main-draw entrants ==
=== Seeds ===
Country	Player	Rank^{1}	Seed
COL	Nicolás Mejía	208	1
GBR	Johannus Monday	212	2
USA	Mitchell Krueger	236	3
USA	Murphy Cassone	245	4
GER	Mats Rosenkranz	261	5
USA	Andres Martin	269	6
GEO	Saba Purtseladze	288	7
USA	Tyler Zink	299	8

- ^{1} Rankings are as of November 3, 2025.

=== Other entrants ===
The following players received wildcards into the singles main draw:

- (France) Sasha Colleu
- (Hungary) Ádám Jilly
- (United Kingdom) Oliver Okonkwo

The following player received entry into the singles main draw using a protected ranking:

- (United States) Micah Braswell

The following player received entry into the singles main draw through the Junior Accelerator programme:

- (South Korea) Roh Ho-young

The following player received entry into the singles main draw as an alternate:

- (United States) Adhithya Ganesan

The following players received entry from the qualifying draw:

- (Germany) Taym Al Azmeh
- (United States) Ryan Fishback
- (Spain) Pablo Martínez Gómez
- (United Kingdom) Lui Maxted
- (Japan) Shunsuke Mitsui
- (Australia) Jeremy Zhang

The following player received entry as a lucky loser:

- (United States) Quinn Vandecasteele

== Champions ==
=== Singles ===
- (United States) Stefan Kozlov def. (United States) Murphy Cassone 7–6^{(7–3)}, 7–5.

=== Doubles ===
- (Australia) Patrick Harper / (Japan) Shunsuke Mitsui def. (United States) Ryan Seggerman / (United States) Keegan Smith 7–5, 6–7^{(3–7)}, [12–10].
