= 2024 Calgary National Bank Challenger – Women's singles =

Women's singles
- 2024 Calgary National Bank Challenger

Final
- Champion: (Canada) Rebecca Marino
- Runner-up: (United States) Anna Rogers
- Score: 7–5, 6–4

Events
Singles	men	women
Doubles	men	women
- Calgary Challenger

Sabine Lisicki was the defending champion, but did not participate due to pregnancy.

Rebecca Marino won the title, defeating Anna Rogers in the final, 7–5, 6–4.

== Seeds ==
1. (Germany) Tatjana Maria (semifinals)
2. (Canada) Rebecca Marino (champion)
3. (Czech Republic) Gabriela Knutson (second round)
4. (Croatia) Lucija Ćirić Bagarić (first round)
5. (United States) Maria Mateas (first round, retired)
6. (Lithuania) Justina Mikulskytė (second round)
7. (Netherlands) Anouk Koevermans (quarterfinals)
8. (United States) Robin Anderson (first round)

== Draw ==
Key

- Q = Qualifier
- WC = Wild card
- LL = Lucky loser
- Alt = Alternate
- ITF = ITF entry
- PR = Protected ranking
- SR = Special ranking
- SE = Special exempt
- JE = Junior exempt
- JR = Junior Accelerator Programme entrant
- CO = College Accelerator Programme entrant
- NG = Next Gen Accelerator Program entrant
- w/o = Walkover
- r = Retired
- d = Defaulted

=== Finals ===
Semifinals
1	(Germany) Tatjana Maria	6	2	0
Q	(United States) Anna Rogers	3	6	6
WC	(Canada) Cadence Brace	0	6	0
2	(Canada) Rebecca Marino	6	2	6

Final
Q	(United States) Anna Rogers	5	4
2	(Canada) Rebecca Marino	7	6

=== Top half ===
First round
1	(Germany) T Maria	6	6
Q	(United States) A Zhu	2	1
(Sweden) K Rinaldo Persson	3	6	4
(Canada) C Branstine	6	2	6
Q	(United States) F Crawley	6	6
SR	(United States) UM Arconada	4	1
Q	(United States) J Failla	2	7^{7}	3
6	(Lithuania) J Mikulskytė	6	6^{4}	6
4	(Croatia) L Ćirić Bagarić	6^{5}	6^{3}
(Belgium) C Vlasselaer	7^{7}	7^{7}
WC	(Canada) A Jacobs	5	4
Q	(United States) A Rogers	7	6
(United States) J Loeb	3	3
(Australia) J Fourlis	6	6
(Canada) S Fung	4
5	(United States) M Mateas	3^{r}

Second round
1	(Germany) T Maria	6	7
(Canada) C Branstine	0	5
Q	(United States) F Crawley	6	6
6	(Lithuania) J Mikulskytė	3	1
(Belgium) C Vlasselaer	6	5	6^{7}
Q	(United States) A Rogers	1	7	7^{9}
(Australia) J Fourlis	1	4
(Canada) S Fung	6	6

Quarterfinals
1	(Germany) T Maria	6	6
Q	(United States) F Crawley	1	2
Q	(United States) A Rogers	6	6
(Canada) S Fung	2	3

Semifinals
1	(Germany) T Maria	6	2	0
Q	(United States) A Rogers	3	6	6

=== Bottom half ===
First round
8	(United States) R Anderson	3	6	6^{4}
SE	(France) J Belgraver	6	3	7^{7}
WC	(Canada) I Boulais	2	3
WC	(Canada) C Brace	6	6
(Canada) K Cross	2	6	6
Q	(Switzerland) J Dürst	6	3	4
(Australia) K McPhee	4	2
3	(Czech Republic) G Knutson	6	6
7	(Netherlands) A Koevermans	6	4	7^{7}
Q	(United States) K Miller	2	6	6^{3}
(Slovakia) V Hrunčáková	5	4
Q	(Poland) U Radwańska	7	6
Q	(Japan) A Koshiishi	7	6
WC	(Canada) M Kupres	5	3
(Romania) G Lee	1	4
2	(Canada) R Marino	6	6

Second round
SE	(France) J Belgraver	5	4
WC	(Canada) C Brace	7	6
(Canada) K Cross	6	6
3	(Czech Republic) G Knutson	2	2
7	(Netherlands) A Koevermans	6	6
Q	(Poland) U Radwańska	2	2
Q	(Japan) A Koshiishi	3	2
2	(Canada) R Marino	6	6

Quarterfinals
WC	(Canada) C Brace	6	7
(Canada) K Cross	2	5
7	(Netherlands) A Koevermans	3	0
2	(Canada) R Marino	6	6

Semifinals
WC	(Canada) C Brace	0	6	0
2	(Canada) R Marino	6	2	6
