= Craig Tyzzer =

Australian tennis coach

- Country (sports): Australia (residence)
- Born: Melbourne, Australia

Coaching career (1997–)
- Andrew Ilie (1997–2004); Ashleigh Barty (2016-2022)

Coaching achievements
- Coachee singles titles total: 13
- Coachee(s) doubles titles total: 9
- List of notable tournaments (with champion) 2022 Australian Open (Barty); 2021 Wimbledon Championships (Barty); 2019 French Open (Barty); 2018 US Open – Women's doubles (Barty); 2019 US Open – Women's doubles runner-up (Barty); 2017 French Open – Women's doubles runner-up (Barty); 2019 WTA Finals – Singles (Barty); WTA Elite Trophy (Barty); 3x Premier Mandatory & Premier 5 Singles (Barty); 4x Premier Mandatory & Premier 5 Doubles (Barty)

Coaching awards and records
- Awards WTA Coach of the Year (2019); Newcombe Medal (2017)
- Last updated on: 30 August 2021.

Craig Tyzzer is an Australian tennis coach and a former ATP tennis player from 1979 to 1983. He coached Ashleigh Barty from 2016 - 2022 when she retired.

== Coaching career ==
He won the WTA Coach of the Year award in 2019. In preparation for Barty's return from an 11-month break, Tyzzer arranged matches with male tennis players in the lead-up to the 2021 Australian Open.
