= Daria Abramowicz =

Polish sports psychologist (born 1987)

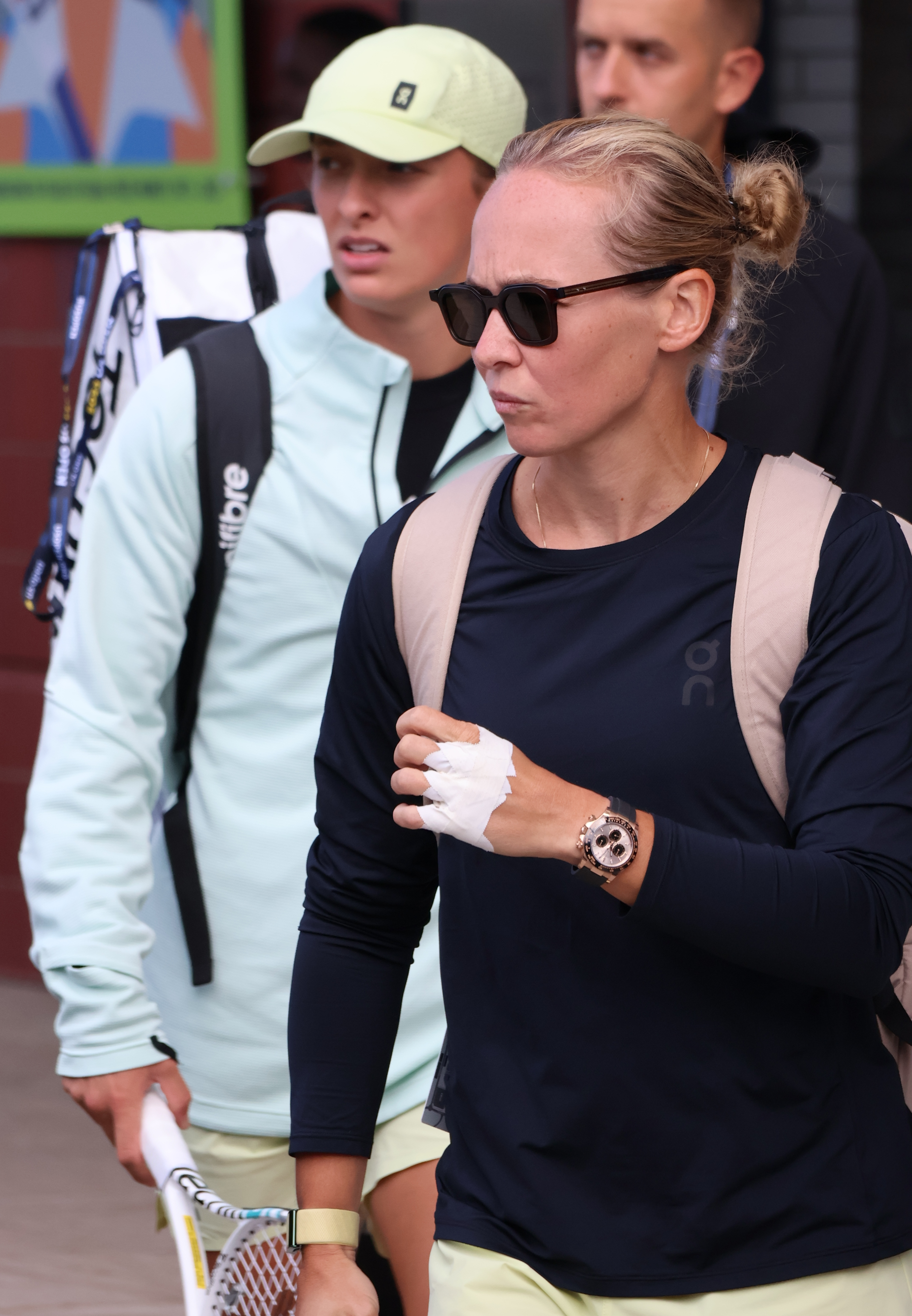
- Iga Świątek and Abramowicz (right) at the 2023 US Open
- Born: 10 October 1987 (age 38); Iława, Poland
- Education: Gdańsk University of Physical Education and Sport; SWPS University
- Occupations: Sailor; sports psychologist
- Known for: Working with Iga Świątek
- Website: Official website

Daria Abramowicz (born 10 October 1987) is a Polish sports psychologist known for working with professional tennis player Iga Świątek.

== Career ==
Abramowicz was born in the northern Polish town of Iława. She was an accomplished sailor as a junior, but a wrist fracture abruptly ended her sailing sports career at age 18. Shortly after the injury, she began unofficially to coach other sailors, before building her reputation as a prominent sports psychologist in Poland by working with other athletes, including cyclists, swimmers, and chess players. At university, she studied sport and psychology, first at the University of Physical Education and Sport in Gdańsk and then at SWPS University in Warsaw, where she graduated with a master's degree in psychology in 2016.

Abramowicz has become known for working closely with Polish tennis player Iga Świątek. In February 2019, when Świątek was 17 and ranked just inside the WTA Tour's top 150, her team approached Abramowicz for mental coaching. Abramowicz traveled to Budapest to watch Świątek play and was impressed by her "competitive fire". Abramowicz soon joined Świątek's traveling team and has helped to emphasize the importance of establishing healthy routines, setting reasonable expectations, and managing on-court stress. According to The New York Times, "Abramowicz works with Swiatek much more frequently than usual [for a mental coach in tennis]". When Świątek acquired her breakthrough first Grand Slam title, at the 2020 French Open, she credited Abramowicz with "[making] my confidence level higher".
