= Govind Nanda =

American tennis player (born 2001)

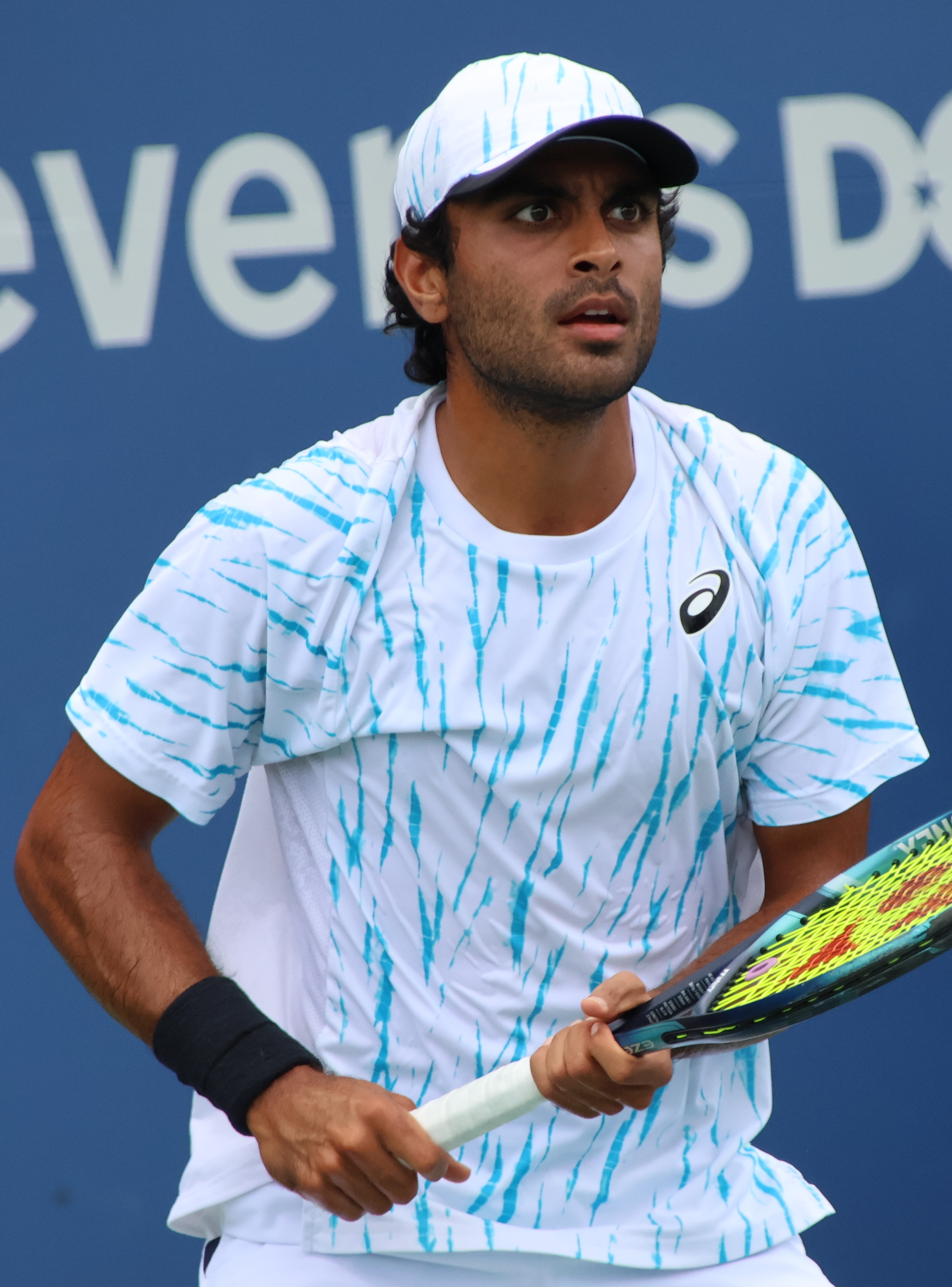
- Nanda at the 2025 Washington Open
- Country (sports): United States
- Born: February 17, 2001 (age 25) Loma Linda, California, US
- Height: 5 ft 10 in (1.78 m)
- Retired: 2025
- Plays: Right-handed (two-handed backhand)
- College: UCLA
- Prize money: US $184,927

Singles
- Career record: 1–1 (Note: In ATP Tour and Grand Slam main draw matches, Summer Olympics, Davis Cup and Laver Cup)
- Career titles: 0; 0 Challenger, 5 Futures
- Highest ranking: No. 339 (3 October 2022)
- Current ranking: No. 340 (21 July 2025)

Grand Slam singles results
- US Open: Q2 (2022)

Doubles
- Career record: 0–1
- Career titles: 0; 0 Challenger, 2 Futures
- Highest ranking: No. 497 (8 August 2022)
- Current ranking: No. 623 (31 March 2025)

Grand Slam doubles results
- US Open: 1R (2022)
- Last updated on: 1 August 2025.

Govind Nanda (born February 17, 2001) is an American tennis player. He has a career-high singles ranking of No. 339 achieved on 3 October 2022, and a doubles ranking of No. 497 achieved on 8 August 2022.

== Personal life ==
Nanda is of Indian heritage. The son of Meena and Rajesh Nanda, he has a sister called Shyamlee. He grew up in Redlands, California before moving to Cerritos, California to be nearer to his training facilities at the USTA centre in Carson. He and his sister started playing tennis at Clement Middle School in Redlands. Nanda attended Laurel Springs School in Ojai, California, before attending University of California, Los Angeles.

== Junior career ==
Nanda reached the final of the Wimbledon boys doubles in 2019 partnering with Liam Draxl. The pair lost to Jonáš Forejtek and Jiří Lehečka .

== Professional career ==
=== 2022: Major doubles debut ===
In September, Nanda was given a wildcard into the 2022 US Open men's doubles partnering with Brandon Holt.

=== 2024: First Challenger final ===
In October, Nanda reached his first Challenger final in Calgary, losing to Murphy Cassone in the final.

=== 2025: ATP debut & first win ===
Nanda made his ATP Tour singles debut as a qualifier at the Los Cabos Open. He defeated Colton Smith in the first round to record his first ATP Tour win. He lost in the second round to third seed and eventual winner Denis Shapovalov.

== ATP Challenger and ITF World Tennis Finals ==
=== Singles: 7 (5–2) ===
| Legend ATP Challenger (0–1) ITF Futures (5–1) | Finals by surface Hard (5–2) Clay (0–0) Grass (0–0) Carpet (0–0) |

| Result | W–L | Date | Tournament | Tier | Surface | Opponent | Score |
|---|---|---|---|---|---|---|---|
| Win | 1–0 | Jan 2019 | M25 Tucson, USA | World Tennis Tour | Hard | (United States) Martin Redlicki | 4–6, 7–6^{(7–2)}, 6–0 |
| Win | 2–0 | Sep 2019 | M25 Harlingen, USA | World Tennis Tour | Hard | (Bulgaria) Adrian Andreev | 6–4, 6–4 |
| Win | 3–0 | Jun 2021 | M25 Wichita, USA | World Tennis Tour | Hard | (United States) Patrick Kypson | 7–6^{(8–6)}, 6–2 |
| Win | 4–0 | Jun 2022 | M25 Tulsa, USA | World Tennis Tour | Hard | (United States) Stefan Dostanic | 6–3, 7–5 |
| Win | 5–0 | Jul 2024 | M15 Lakewood, USA | World Tennis Tour | Hard | (United States) Stefan Dostanic | 6–4, 5–7, 7–5 |
| Loss | 5–1 | Jul 2024 | M15 Lakewood, USA | World Tennis Tour | Hard | (United States) Learner Tien | 3–6, 3–6 |
| Loss | 5–2 | Oct 2024 | Calgary, Canada | Challenger | Hard (i) | (United States) Murphy Cassone | 6–4, 3–6, 4–6 |

=== Doubles: 4 (2–2) ===
| Legend ATP Challenger (0–0) ITF Futures (2–2) | Finals by surface Hard (2–1) Clay (0–1) Grass (0–0) Carpet (0–0) |

| Result | W–L | Date | Tournament | Tier | Surface | Partner | Opponents | Score |
|---|---|---|---|---|---|---|---|---|
| Loss | 0–1 | Apr 2022 | M15 Orange Park, USA | World Tennis Tour | Clay | (United States) Aidan Mayo | (Ghana) Abraham Asaba (United States) Sekou Bangoura | 6–7^{(2–7)}, 6–3, [9–11] |
| Win | 1–1 | Jul 2022 | M25 Dallas, USA | World Tennis Tour | Hard | (United States) Tyler Zink | (Chinese Taipei) Yu Hsiou Hsu (Australia) Dane Sweeny | 6–4, 6–4 |
| Loss | 1–2 | Jun 2024 | M25 Tulsa, USA | World Tennis Tour | Hard | (Canada) Cleeve Harper | (United States) Aidan Kim (United States) Cannon Kingsley | 3–6, 7–5, [7–10] |
| Win | 2–2 | Mar 2025 | M25 Calabasas, USA | World Tennis Tour | Hard | (Canada) Benjamin Sigouin | (United States) Jayson Blando (United States) Michael Blando | 6–2, 6–7^{(4–7)}, [10–1] |

== Junior Grand Slam finals ==
=== Doubles: 1 (1 runner-up) ===
| Result | Year | Tournament | Surface | Partner | Opponents | Score |
|---|---|---|---|---|---|---|
| Loss | 2019 | Wimbledon | Grass | (Canada) Liam Draxl | (Czech Republic) Jonáš Forejtek (Czech Republic) Jiří Lehečka | 5–7, 4–6 |
