= 2023 Calgary National Bank Challenger =

- Date: 6–12 November 2023
- Edition: 4th (men); 2nd (women)
- Category: ATP Challenger Tour; ITF Women's World Tennis Tour
- Surface: Hard / Indoor
- Location: Calgary, Canada

Champions

Men's singles
- (Canada) Liam Draxl

Women's singles
- (Germany) Sabine Lisicki

Men's doubles
- (Canada) Juan Carlos Aguilar / (Canada) Justin Boulais

Women's doubles
- (United Kingdom) Sarah Beth Grey / (United Kingdom) Eden Silva
- Calgary Challenger

The 2023 Calgary National Bank Challenger was a professional tennis tournament played on indoor hard courts. It was the fourth edition of the tournament which was part of the 2023 ATP Challenger Tour and the second edition of the tournament which was part of the 2023 ITF Women's World Tennis Tour. It took place in Calgary, Canada between 6 and 12 November 2023.

== Champions ==
=== Men's singles ===
- (Canada) Liam Draxl def. (Germany) Dominik Koepfer 6–4, 6–3.

=== Women's singles ===
- (Germany) Sabine Lisicki def. (Canada) Stacey Fung 7–6^{(7–2)}, 6–7^{(5–7)}, 6–3.

=== Men's doubles ===
- (Canada) Juan Carlos Aguilar / (Canada) Justin Boulais def. (United Kingdom) Charles Broom / (United Kingdom) Ben Jones 6–3, 6–2.

=== Women's doubles ===
- (United Kingdom) Sarah Beth Grey / (United Kingdom) Eden Silva def. (United States) Hanna Chang / (Serbia) Katarina Jokić, 6–4, 6–4

== Men's singles main draw entrants ==
=== Seeds ===
Country	Player	Rank^{1}	Seed
GER	Dominik Koepfer	75	1
AUS	James Duckworth	111	2
FRA	Benoît Paire	126	3
CAN	Gabriel Diallo	136	4
GBR	Ryan Peniston	181	5
BEL	Zizou Bergs	184	6
BEL	Kimmer Coppejans	190	7
TUN	Aziz Dougaz	232	8

- ^{1} Rankings are as of 30 October 2023.

=== Other entrants ===
The following players received wildcards into the singles main draw:

- (Canada) Justin Boulais
- (Canada) Liam Draxl
- (Canada) Dan Martin

The following players received entry from the qualifying draw:

- (Canada) Juan Carlos Aguilar
- (United Kingdom) Patrick Brady
- (Spain) Iñaki Montes de la Torre
- (New Zealand) Kiranpal Pannu
- (United States) Ryan Seggerman
- (France) Enzo Wallart

== Women's singles main draw entrants ==
=== Seeds ===
Country	Player	Rank^{1}	Seed
CAN	Katherine Sebov	141	1
AUS	Arina Rodionova	148	2
SUI	Lulu Sun	223	3
NED	Lesley Pattinama Kerkhove	234	4
CAN	Stacey Fung	250	5
LTU	Justina Mikulskytė	271	6
USA	Jamie Loeb	285	7
USA	Liv Hovde	291	8

- ^{1} Rankings are as of 23 October 2023.

=== Other entrants ===
The following players received wildcards into the singles main draw:

- (Canada) Kayla Cross
- (Canada) Alexia Jacobs
- (Canada) Martyna Ostrzygalo
- (Canada) Layne Sleeth

The following players received entry from the qualifying draw:

- (Canada) Isabelle Boulais
- (Serbia) Katarina Jokić
- (United States) Kylie McKenzie
- (Slovakia) Martina Okáľová
- Kira Pavlova
- (France) Caroline Roméo
- (United States) Allura Zamarripa
- (United States) Amy Zhu

The following player received entry as a lucky loser:

- (Japan) Nagi Hanatani
