= 2022 Calgary National Bank Challenger – Women's singles =

Women's singles
- 2022 Calgary National Bank Challenger

Final
- Champion: (United States) Robin Montgomery
- Runner-up: (Poland) Urszula Radwańska
- Score: 7–6^{(8–6)}, 7–5

Events
Singles	men	women
Doubles	men	women
Calgary Challenger	· 2023 →

This was the first edition of the tournament.

Robin Montgomery won the title, defeating Urszula Radwańska in the final, 7–6^{(8–6)}, 7–5.

== Seeds ==
1. (United States) Danielle Lao (first round)
2. (Hong Kong) Eudice Chong (semifinals)
3. (India) Karman Thandi (second round)
4. (United States) Sophie Chang (first round)
5. (United States) Robin Montgomery (champion)
6. (United States) Francesca Di Lorenzo (second round)
7. (United States) Jamie Loeb (semifinals)
8. (United States) Catherine Harrison (first round)

== Draw ==
=== Key ===
- Q = Qualifier
- WC = Wild card
- LL = Lucky loser
- Alt = Alternate
- SE = Special exempt
- PR = Protected ranking
- ITF = ITF entry
- JE = Junior exempt
- w/o = Walkover
- r = Retired
- d = Defaulted
- SR = Special ranking

=== Finals ===
Semifinals
7	(United States) Jamie Loeb	4	6	6^{3}
5	(United States) Robin Montgomery	6	1	7^{7}
(Poland) Urszula Radwańska	2	6	6
2	(Hong Kong) Eudice Chong	6	4	3

Final
5	(United States) Robin Montgomery	7^{8}	7
(Poland) Urszula Radwańska	6^{6}	5

=== Top half ===
First round
1	(United States) D Lao	7	6^{4}	3
Q	(Denmark) J Svendsen	5	7^{7}	6
WC	(Canada) K Cross	2	5
(Slovakia) V Morvayová	6	7
(Thailand) P Plipuech	1	3
(United States) E Bektas	6	6
(United States) H Chang	4	7^{7}	6^{3}
7	(United States) J Loeb	6	6^{4}	7^{7}
4	(United States) S Chang	4	6	4
Q	(Canada) M Ostrzygalo	6	1	6
PR	(Germany) S Lisicki	6	6
Q	(United States) C Corley	1	4
Q	(Australia) E Bolton	6^{7}	3
WC	(Canada) M Kupres	7^{9}	6
LL	(South Korea) J-h Choi	3	1
5	(United States) R Montgomery	6	6

Second round
Q	(Denmark) J Svendsen	6	4
(Slovakia) V Morvayová	1	0^{r}
(United States) E Bektas	2	6	3
7	(United States) J Loeb	6	3	6
Q	(Canada) M Ostrzygalo	2	2
PR	(Germany) S Lisicki	6	6
WC	(Canada) M Kupres	3	6^{3}
5	(United States) R Montgomery	6	7^{7}

Quarterfinals
Q	(Denmark) J Svendsen	3	3
7	(United States) J Loeb	6	6
PR	(Germany) S Lisicki	6^{7}	6^{4}
5	(United States) R Montgomery	7^{9}	7^{7}

Semifinals
7	(United States) J Loeb	4	6	6^{3}
5	(United States) R Montgomery	6	1	7^{7}

=== Bottom half ===
First round
8	(United States) C Harrison	2	1
(Poland) U Radwańska	6	6
(France) T Fiquet	1	5
WC	(Canada) L Sleeth	6	7
Q	(Canada) T Chavez	6	3	6^{3}
(Mexico) AS Sánchez	1	6	7^{7}
(Czech Republic) M Bayerlová	3	6	1
3	(India) K Thandi	6	3	6
6	(United States) F Di Lorenzo	6	6
Q	(Canada) A Grubor	0	2
WC	(Canada) A Jacobs	2	4
(United States) R Kingsley	6	6
(Canada) S Fung	7^{7}	6
(Chinese Taipei) E-s Liang	6^{5}	3
(Canada) M Stakusic	2	5
2	(Hong Kong) E Chong	6	7

Second round
(Poland) U Radwańska	6^{6}	6	6
WC	(Canada) L Sleeth	7^{8}	2	1
(Mexico) AS Sánchez	7	7^{7}
3	(India) K Thandi	5	6^{2}
6	(United States) F Di Lorenzo	6^{1}	1
(United States) R Kingsley	7^{7}	6
(Canada) S Fung	6	6^{4}	4
2	(Hong Kong) E Chong	3	7^{7}	6

Quarterfinals
(Poland) U Radwańska	6	7^{7}
(Mexico) AS Sánchez	1	6^{5}
(United States) R Kingsley	6	4	3
2	(Hong Kong) E Chong	3	6	6

Semifinals
(Poland) U Radwańska	2	6	6
2	(Hong Kong) E Chong	6	4	3
