= 2022 Calgary National Bank Challenger – Women's doubles =

Women's doubles
- 2022 Calgary National Bank Challenger

Final
- Champions: (United States) Catherine Harrison (United States) Sabrina Santamaria
- Runners-up: (Canada) Kayla Cross (Canada) Marina Stakusic
- Score: 7–6^{(7–2)}, 6–4

Events
Singles	men	women
Doubles	men	women
Calgary Challenger	· 2023 →

This was the first edition of the tournament.

Catherine Harrison and Sabrina Santamaria won the title, defeating Kayla Cross and Marina Stakusic in the final, 7–6^{(7–2)}, 6–4.

== Seeds ==
1. (United States) Catherine Harrison / (United States) Sabrina Santamaria (champions)
2. (South Korea) Choi Ji-hee / (Thailand) Peangtarn Plipuech (quarterfinals)
3. (Australia) Elysia Bolton / (United States) Jamie Loeb (first round)
4. (Czech Republic) Michaela Bayerlová / (United States) Hanna Chang (quarterfinals)

== Draw ==
=== Key ===
- Q = Qualifier
- WC = Wild card
- LL = Lucky loser
- Alt = Alternate
- SE = Special exempt
- PR = Protected ranking
- ITF = ITF entry
- JE = Junior exempt
- w/o = Walkover
- r = Retired
- d = Defaulted
- SR = Special ranking

=== Draw ===
First round
(Canada) N Akinbiyi (Canada) A Xie	6^{4}	4
(United States) A Goel (Canada) M Ostrzygalo	7^{7}	6
3	(Australia) E Bolton (United States) J Loeb	3	3
(Canada) S Fung (Canada) L Sleeth	6	6
(United States) K Hui (United States) H Shaikh	3	6	[5]
(United States) F Di Lorenzo (Chinese Taipei) E-s Liang	6	3	[10]
(Canada) T Chavez (Canada) A Jacobs	4	1
(Canada) K Cross (Canada) M Stakusic	6	6
(France) T Fiquet (Mexico) AS Sánchez	4	6^{6}
4	(Czech Republic) M Bayerlová (United States) H Chang	6	7^{8}
(Canada) M Kupres (Denmark) J Svendsen	6^{3}	3
(United States) C Corley (United States) I Corley	7^{7}	6

Quarterfinals
1	(United States) C Harrison (United States) S Santamaria	6	7
(United States) A Goel (Canada) M Ostrzygalo	2	5
(Canada) S Fung (Canada) L Sleeth	1	3
(United States) F Di Lorenzo (Chinese Taipei) E-s Liang	6	6
(Canada) K Cross (Canada) M Stakusic	6	2	[10]
4	(Czech Republic) M Bayerlová (United States) H Chang	0	6	[7]
(United States) C Corley (United States) I Corley	6	4	[10]
2	(South Korea) J-h Choi (Thailand) P Plipuech	1	6	[7]

Semifinals
1	(United States) C Harrison (United States) S Santamaria	6	6
(United States) F Di Lorenzo (Chinese Taipei) E-s Liang	3	4
(Canada) K Cross (Canada) M Stakusic	6	6
(United States) C Corley (United States) I Corley	3	3

Final
1	(United States) C Harrison (United States) S Santamaria	7^{7}	6
(Canada) K Cross (Canada) M Stakusic	6^{2}	4
