= 2022 Calgary National Bank Challenger =

Tennis tournament

- Date: 7–13 November 2022
- Edition: 3rd (men); 1st (women)
- Category: ATP Challenger Tour; ITF Women's World Tennis Tour
- Prize money: $53,120 (men) $60,000 (women)
- Surface: Hard / Indoor
- Location: Calgary, Canada

Champions

Men's singles
- (Germany) Dominik Koepfer

Women's singles
- (United States) Robin Montgomery

Men's doubles
- (Austria) Maximilian Neuchrist / (Greece) Michail Pervolarakis

Women's doubles
- (United States) Catherine Harrison / (United States) Sabrina Santamaria
- Calgary Challenger

The 2022 Calgary National Bank Challenger was a professional tennis tournament played on indoor hard courts. It was the third edition of the tournament which was part of the 2022 ATP Challenger Tour and the first edition of the tournament which was part of the 2022 ITF Women's World Tennis Tour. It took place in Calgary, Canada between 7 and 13 November 2022.

== Champions ==
=== Men's singles ===
- (Germany) Dominik Koepfer def. (Australia) Aleksandar Vukic 6–2, 6–4.

=== Women's singles ===
- (United States) Robin Montgomery def. (Poland) Urszula Radwańska, 7–6^{(8–6)}, 7–5

=== Men's doubles ===
- (Austria) Maximilian Neuchrist / (Greece) Michail Pervolarakis def. (Italy) Julian Ocleppo / (Germany) Kai Wehnelt 6–4, 6–4.

=== Women's doubles ===
- (United States) Catherine Harrison / (United States) Sabrina Santamaria def. (Canada) Kayla Cross / (Canada) Marina Stakusic, 7–6^{(7–2)}, 6–4

== Men's singles main draw entrants ==
=== Seeds ===
Country	Player	Rank^{1}	Seed
ECU	Emilio Gómez	112	1
CAN	Vasek Pospisil	121	2
ARG	Juan Pablo Ficovich	139	3
AUS	Aleksandar Vukic	145	4
GER	Dominik Koepfer	181	5
FRA	Antoine Escoffier	215	6
USA	Brandon Holt	218	7
CAN	Alexis Galarneau	222	8

- ^{1} Rankings are as of 31 October 2022.

=== Other entrants ===
The following players received wildcards into the singles main draw:

- (Canada) Justin Boulais
- (Canada) Cleeve Harper
- (Canada) Jaden Weekes

The following player received entry into the singles main draw using a protected ranking:

- (Italy) Julian Ocleppo

The following players received entry into the singles main draw as alternates:

- (Tunisia) Malek Jaziri
- (Germany) Max Hans Rehberg

The following players received entry from the qualifying draw:

- (United Kingdom) Arthur Fery
- (Germany) Johannes Härteis
- (Poland) Maks Kaśnikowski
- (Austria) Maximilian Neuchrist
- (United States) Alfredo Perez
- (Greece) Michail Pervolarakis

== Women's singles main draw entrants ==
=== Seeds ===
Country	Player	Rank^{1}	Seed
USA	Danielle Lao	217	1
HKG	Eudice Chong	219	2
IND	Karman Thandi	220	3
USA	Sophie Chang	233	4
USA	Robin Montgomery	257	5
USA	Francesca Di Lorenzo	267	6
USA	Jamie Loeb	271	7
USA	Catherine Harrison	282	8

- ^{1} Rankings are as of 31 October 2022.

=== Other entrants ===
The following players received wildcards into the singles main draw:

- (Canada) Kayla Cross
- (Canada) Alexia Jacobs
- (Canada) Mia Kupres
- (Canada) Layne Sleeth

The following player received entry into the singles main draw using a protected ranking:

- (Germany) Sabine Lisicki

The following players received entry from the qualifying draw:

- (Australia) Elysia Bolton
- (Canada) Teah Chavez
- (United States) Carmen Corley
- (Canada) Ana Grubor
- (Canada) Martyna Ostrzygalo
- (Denmark) Johanne Svendsen

The following player received entry as a lucky loser:

- (South Korea) Choi Ji-hee
