= 2020 Calgary National Bank Challenger =

- Date: 24 February–1 March
- Edition: 2nd
- Surface: Hard (indoor)
- Location: Calgary, Canada

Champions

Singles
- (France) Arthur Rinderknech

Doubles
- (United States) Nathan Pasha / (United States) Max Schnur
- Calgary National Bank Challenger

The 2020 Calgary National Bank Challenger was a professional tennis tournament played on indoor hard courts. It was the second edition of the tournament and part of the 2020 ATP Challenger Tour. It took place in Calgary, Canada.

== Singles entrants ==
=== Seeds ===
Country	Player	Rank^{1}	Seed
CAN	Vasek Pospisil	98	1
JPN	Go Soeda	114	2
CRO	Ivo Karlović	123	3
JPN	Tatsuma Ito	152	4
CAN	Brayden Schnur	178	5
USA	Thai-Son Kwiatkowski	182	6
GBR	Liam Broady	228	7
FRA	Arthur Rinderknech	239	8
GER	Julian Lenz	245	9
USA	Maxime Cressy	252	10
GER	Tobias Kamke	254	11
AUS	Akira Santillan	258	12
USA	JC Aragone	267	13
FRA	Geoffrey Blancaneaux	270	14
POR	Gonçalo Oliveira	278	15
FRA	Manuel Guinard	300	16

- ^{1} Rankings are as of 17 February 2020.

=== Other entrants ===
The following players received wildcards into the singles main draw:

- (Canada) Taha Baadi
- (Canada) Gabriel Diallo
- (Canada) Alexis Galarneau
- (Canada) Cleeve Harper
- (Canada) Joshua Peck

The following player received entry into the singles main draw using a protected ranking:

- (Australia) Blake Mott

The following players received entry from the qualifying draw:

- (United States) Felix Corwin
- (United States) Alex Rybakov

The following players received entry as lucky losers:

- (Finland) Harri Heliövaara
- (United States) Dennis Novikov

== Champions ==
=== Singles ===
- (France) Arthur Rinderknech def. (United States) Maxime Cressy 3–6, 7–6^{(7–5)}, 6–4.

=== Doubles ===
- (United States) Nathan Pasha / (United States) Max Schnur def. (Australia) Harry Bourchier / (Canada) Filip Peliwo 7–6^{(7–4)}, 6–3.
