= 2022 Calgary National Bank Challenger – Men's doubles =

Men's doubles
- 2022 Calgary National Bank Challenger

Final
- Champions: (Austria) Maximilian Neuchrist (Greece) Michail Pervolarakis
- Runners-up: (Italy) Julian Ocleppo (Germany) Kai Wehnelt
- Score: 6–4, 6–4

Events
Singles	men	women
Doubles	men	women
- Calgary National Bank Challenger

Nathan Pasha and Max Schnur were the defending champions but only Schnur chose to defend his title, partnering Evan King. Schnur lost in the first round to Arthur Fery and Harold Mayot.

Maximilian Neuchrist and Michail Pervolarakis won the title after defeating Julian Ocleppo and Kai Wehnelt 6–4, 6–4 in the final.

== Seeds ==
1. (United States) Robert Galloway / (Mexico) Hans Hach Verdugo (first round)
2. (United States) Evan King / (United States) Max Schnur (first round)
3. (Austria) Maximilian Neuchrist / (Greece) Michail Pervolarakis (champions)
4. (Belgium) Michael Geerts / (Tunisia) Skander Mansouri (first round)

== Draw ==
Key

- Q = Qualifier
- WC = Wild card
- LL = Lucky loser
- Alt = Alternate
- ITF = ITF entry
- PR = Protected ranking
- SR = Special ranking
- SE = Special exempt
- JE = Junior exempt
- JR = Junior Accelerator Programme entrant
- CO = College Accelerator Programme entrant
- NG = Next Gen Accelerator Program entrant
- w/o = Walkover
- r = Retired
- d = Defaulted

First round
1	(United States) R Galloway (Mexico) H Hach Verdugo	3	7^{7}	[7]
(Germany) J Härteis (Czech Republic) D Poljak	6	6^{1}	[10]
PR	(Italy) J Ocleppo (Germany) K Wehnelt	6	6
(Croatia) Z Babić (Canada) K Stevenson	3	2
4	(Belgium) M Geerts (Tunisia) S Mansouri	6	2	[10]
(United Kingdom) C Broom (Germany) C Frantzen	4	6	[12]
WC	(Canada) D Chan (Canada) Keegan Rice	5	0
WC	(Canada) J Boulais (Canada) C Harper	7	6
(Brazil) G Décamps (Monaco) V Vacherot	5	6^{3}
(Israel) E Leshem (Canada) B Sigouin	7	7^{7}
(United States) A Perez (United States) E Zhu	4	4
3	(Austria) M Neuchrist (Greece) M Pervolarakis	6	6
(Zimbabwe) B Lock (Zimbabwe) CJ Lock	4	6	[6]
(Tunisia) A Dougaz (France) A Escoffier	6	3	[10]
(United Kingdom) A Fery (France) H Mayot	6	6^{5}	[10]
2	(United States) E King (United States) M Schnur	3	7^{7}	[8]

Quarterfinals
(Germany) J Härteis (Czech Republic) D Poljak	1	1^{r}
PR	(Italy) J Ocleppo (Germany) K Wehnelt	6	4
(United Kingdom) C Broom (Germany) C Frantzen	3	6	[10]
WC	(Canada) J Boulais (Canada) C Harper	6	3	[8]
(Israel) E Leshem (Canada) B Sigouin	1	3
3	(Austria) M Neuchrist (Greece) M Pervolarakis	6	6
(Tunisia) A Dougaz (France) A Escoffier	6	6^{5}	[10]
(United Kingdom) A Fery (France) H Mayot	3	7^{7}	[5]

Semifinals
PR	(Italy) J Ocleppo (Germany) K Wehnelt	7^{7}	6
(United Kingdom) C Broom (Germany) C Frantzen	6^{3}	2
3	(Austria) M Neuchrist (Greece) M Pervolarakis	7^{7}	6
(Tunisia) A Dougaz (France) A Escoffier	6^{2}	3

Final
PR	(Italy) J Ocleppo (Germany) K Wehnelt	4	4
3	(Austria) M Neuchrist (Greece) M Pervolarakis	6	6
