= 2024 Georgia's Rome Tennis Open – Singles =

Singles
- 2024 Georgia's Rome Tennis Open

Final
- Champion: (United States) McCartney Kessler
- Runner-up: (United States) Liv Hovde
- Score: 6–4, 6–1

Events
Singles	Doubles
← 2023 ·	Georgia's Rome Tennis Open	· 2025 →

McCartney Kessler was the defending champion and successfully defended her title, defeating Liv Hovde in the final, 6–4, 6–1.

== Seeds ==
1. (Argentina) María Lourdes Carlé (quarterfinals)
2. (United States) Hailey Baptiste (semifinals)
3. (United States) Ann Li (first round)
4. (United States) Robin Montgomery (quarterfinals)
5. (United States) McCartney Kessler (champion)
6. Iryna Shymanovich (second round)
7. (Canada) Carol Zhao (first round)
8. (Canada) Stacey Fung (quarterfinals)

== Draw ==
=== Key ===
- Q = Qualifier
- WC = Wild card
- LL = Lucky loser
- Alt = Alternate
- ITF = ITF entry
- PR = Protected ranking
- SR = Special ranking
- SE = Special exempt
- JE = Junior exempt
- JR = Junior Accelerator Programme entrant
- CO = College Accelerator Programme entrant
- NG = Next Gen Accelerator Program entrant
- w/o = Walkover
- r = Retired
- d = Defaulted

=== Finals ===
Semifinals
(United States) Robin Anderson	4	6	4
(United States) Liv Hovde	6	4	6
5	(United States) McCartney Kessler	2	6	6
2/WC	(United States) Hailey Baptiste	6	3	3

Final
(United States) Liv Hovde	4	1
5	(United States) McCartney Kessler	6	6

=== Top half ===
First round
1	(Argentina) ML Carlé	6	6
(United States) W Osuigwe	4	1
(Mexico) F Contreras	1	7	1
(United States) V Wolff	6	5	6
(Belgium) S Costoulas	3	7	4
(Ukraine) V Strakhova	6	5	6
(United States) R Anderson	6	0	6
7	(Canada) C Zhao	1	6	4
3	(United States) A Li	0	3
Q	(United States) E Ionescu	6	6
Q	(United States) D Hewitt	5	4
(United States) L Hovde	7	6
(Romania) G Lee	6	4	4
JE	(United States) M Sieg	3	6	6
Q	(Ukraine) K Vozniak	4	2
8	(Canada) S Fung	6	6

Second round
1	(Argentina) ML Carlé	6	6
(United States) V Wolff	4	1
(Ukraine) V Strakhova	3	0
(United States) R Anderson	6	6
Q	(United States) E Ionescu	7	3	1
(United States) L Hovde	5	6	6
JE	(United States) M Sieg	3	6^{5}
8	(Canada) S Fung	6	7^{7}

Quarterfinals
1	(Argentina) ML Carlé	1	6^{3}
(United States) R Anderson	6	7^{7}
(United States) L Hovde	2	6	6
8	(Canada) S Fung	6	3	3

Semifinals
(United States) R Anderson	4	6	4
(United States) L Hovde	6	4	6

=== Bottom half ===
First round
5	(United States) M Kessler	6	6
(United States) G Min	4	1
V Miroshnichenko	6	3	6
(United States) J Loeb	4	6	2
(United States) L Chirico	6	6
Q	(United States) A Markham	3	2
WC	(United States) C Ngounoue	5	4
4	(United States) R Montgomery	7	6
6	I Shymanovich	6	6
Q	(Chinese Taipei) C-y Hsu	4	4
(United States) V Hu	4	6	6
Q	(United States) V Osuigwe	6	1	0
Q	(France) T Lemaître	6^{5}	6	2
(United States) S Chang	7^{7}	4	6
Q	(United States) S Daavettila	2	3
2/WC	(United States) H Baptiste	6	6

Second round
5	(United States) M Kessler	6	6
V Miroshnichenko	1	3
(United States) L Chirico	2	1
4	(United States) R Montgomery	6	6
6	I Shymanovich	1	4
(United States) V Hu	6	6
(United States) S Chang	6^{2}	3
2/WC	(United States) H Baptiste	7^{7}	6

Quarterfinals
5	(United States) M Kessler	7^{7}	6
4	(United States) R Montgomery	6^{1}	3
(United States) V Hu	1	3
2/WC	(United States) H Baptiste	6	6

Semifinals
5	(United States) M Kessler	2	6	6
2/WC	(United States) H Baptiste	6	3	3
