= 2023 Georgia's Rome Tennis Open 2 – Singles =

Singles
- 2023 Georgia's Rome Tennis Open 2

Final
- Champion: (United States) McCartney Kessler
- Runner-up: (United States) Grace Min
- Score: 6–2, 6–1

Events
Singles	Doubles
← 2023 ·	Georgia's Rome Tennis Open	· 2024 →

Last week's Central Coast Pro Tennis Open champion Taylor Townsend was the top seed, but lost in the first round to McCartney Kessler.

Kessler won the title, defeating Grace Min in the final, 6–2, 6–1.

== Seeds ==
1. (United States) Taylor Townsend (first round)
2. (United States) Hailey Baptiste (withdrew)
3. (United States) Ann Li (quarterfinals)
4. (France) Elsa Jacquemot (quarterfinals)
5. (Mexico) Renata Zarazúa (semifinals)
6. Tatiana Prozorova (first round)
7. (Canada) Stacey Fung (second round)
8. Anastasia Tikhonova (quarterfinals)

== Draw ==
=== Key ===
- Q = Qualifier
- WC = Wild card
- LL = Lucky loser
- Alt = Alternate
- SE = Special exempt
- PR = Protected ranking
- ITF = ITF entry
- JE = Junior exempt
- w/o = Walkover
- r = Retired
- d = Defaulted
- SR = Special ranking

=== Finals ===
Semifinals
(United States) McCartney Kessler	6	6
5	(Mexico) Renata Zarazúa	4	4
(United States) Grace Min	6	7^{8}
(United States) Jamie Loeb	2	6^{6}

Final
(United States) McCartney Kessler	6	6
(United States) Grace Min	2	1

=== Top half ===
First round
1	(United States) T Townsend	2	4
(United States) M Kessler	6	6
Q	(United States) R McAdoo	6	4	4
(India) S Yamalapalli	2	6	6
(United States) R Kingsley	6^{5}	6	6
Q	(Japan) E Koike	7^{7}	3	2
(United States) R Anderson	7	5	4
8	A Tikhonova	5	7	6
4	(France) E Jacquemot	6	6
Q	(United States) V Flores	4	2
WC	(United States) C Beck	4	6	1
(Mexico) F Contreras	6	3	6
(United States) V Lepchenko	7^{7}	2	2
WC	(United States) D Hewitt	6^{5}	6	6
(United States) C Rosca	2	1
5	(Mexico) R Zarazúa	6	6

Second round
(United States) M Kessler	6	6
(India) S Yamalapalli	4	2
(United States) R Kingsley	0	3
8	A Tikhonova	6	6
4	(France) E Jacquemot	6	6
(Mexico) F Contreras	2	2
WC	(United States) D Hewitt	3	2
5	(Mexico) R Zarazúa	6	6

Quarterfinals
(United States) M Kessler	6^{4}	6	7^{7}
8	A Tikhonova	7^{7}	3	6^{3}
4	(France) E Jacquemot	6	4	4
5	(Mexico) R Zarazúa	1	6	6

Semifinals
(United States) M Kessler	6	6
5	(Mexico) R Zarazúa	4	4

=== Bottom half ===
First round
6	T Prozorova	4	6	4
(United States) G Min	6	2	6
Q	(France) M Noël	6	6
Q	(United States) S Sewing	1	3
WC	(United States) M Yamakita	6	1	6
Q	(United States) A Rogers	4	6	3
(Germany) A Vecic	4	4
3	(United States) A Li	6	6
7	(Canada) S Fung	6	6
Q	(Chinese Taipei) C-y Hsu	3	2
(United States) J Loeb	6	7
(Serbia) K Kozarov	4	5
(United States) W Osuigwe	6	2	2
WC	(United States) A Smith	3	6	6
(United States) V Hu	6	7^{7}
LL	(Canada) L Kwong	4	6^{5}

Second round
(United States) G Min	6	6
Q	(France) M Noël	3	3
WC	(United States) M Yamakita	2	1
3	(United States) A Li	6	6
7	(Canada) S Fung	4	6	3
(United States) J Loeb	6	3	6
WC	(United States) A Smith	6^{3}	6^{4}
(United States) V Hu	7^{7}	7^{7}

Quarterfinals
(United States) G Min	1	7^{7}	6
3	(United States) A Li	6	6^{5}	2
(United States) J Loeb	6	2	6
(United States) V Hu	4	6	3

Semifinals
(United States) G Min	6	7^{8}
(United States) J Loeb	2	6^{6}
