= 2023 Georgia's Rome Tennis Open 2 =

Tennis tournament

- Date: 2–8 October 2023
- Edition: 4th
- Category: ITF Women's World Tennis Tour
- Prize money: $60,000
- Surface: Hard / Indoor
- Location: Rome, Georgia, United Status

Champions

Singles
- (United States) McCartney Kessler

Doubles
- (United States) Sofia Sewing / Anastasia Tikhonova
← 2023 ·	Georgia's Rome Tennis Open	· 2024 →

The 2023 Georgia's Rome Tennis Open 2 is a professional tennis tournament played on indoor hard courts. It was primarily organised due to the cancellation of Henderson Tennis Open which was held in Las Vegas. Tournament which was part of the 2023 ITF Women's World Tennis Tour. It took place in Rome, Georgia, United States between 2 and 8 October 2023.

== Champions ==
=== Singles ===
- (United States) McCartney Kessler def. (United States) Grace Min 6–2, 6–1.

=== Doubles ===
- (United States) Sofia Sewing / Anastasia Tikhonova def. (United States) Robin Anderson / (Mexico) Fernanda Contreras 4–6, 6–3, [10–7].

== Singles main-draw entrants ==
=== Seeds ===
Country	Player	Rank^{1}	Seed
USA	Taylor Townsend	89	1
~~USA~~	~~Hailey Baptiste~~	~~137~~	~~2~~
USA	Ann Li	156	3
FRA	Elsa Jacquemot	177	4
MEX	Renata Zarazúa	182	5
	Tatiana Prozorova	199	6
CAN	Stacey Fung	226	7
	Anastasia Tikhonova	234	8

- ^{1} Rankings are as of 25 September 2023.

=== Other entrants ===
The following players received wildcards into the singles main draw:

- (United States) Chloe Beck
- (United States) Dalayna Hewitt
- (United States) Alana Smith
- (United States) Mia Yamakita

The following players received entry from the qualifying draw:

- (United States) Victoria Flores
- (Chinese Taipei) Hsu Chieh-yu
- (Japan) Ena Koike
- (United States) Rasheeda McAdoo
- (France) Mallaurie Noël
- (United States) Anna Rogers
- (United States) Christina Rosca
- (United States) Sofia Sewing

The following player received entry as a lucky loser:

- (Canada) Louise Kwong
