= 2024 Georgia's Rome Tennis Open =

Tennis tournament

- Date: 29 January–4 February 2024
- Edition: 5th
- Category: ITF Women's World Tennis Tour
- Prize money: $60,000
- Surface: Hard / Indoor
- Location: Rome, United States

Champions

Singles
- (United States) McCartney Kessler

Doubles
- (United States) Angela Kulikov / (United States) Jamie Loeb
← 2023 ·	Georgia's Rome Tennis Open	· 2025 →

The 2024 Georgia's Rome Tennis Open was a professional tennis tournament played on indoor hard courts. It was the fifth edition of the tournament, which was part of the 2024 ITF Women's World Tennis Tour. It took place in Rome, Georgia, United States, between 29 January and 4 February 2024.

== Champions ==
=== Singles ===
- (United States) McCartney Kessler def. (United States) Liv Hovde, 6–4, 6–1

=== Doubles ===
- (United States) Angela Kulikov / (United States) Liv Hovde def. (United States) Hailey Baptiste / (United States) Whitney Osuigwe, walkover

== Singles main draw entrants ==
=== Seeds ===
Country	Player	Rank	Seed
ARG	María Lourdes Carlé	124	1
USA	Hailey Baptiste	130	2
USA	Ann Li	165	3
USA	Robin Montgomery	194	4
USA	McCartney Kessler	206	5
	Iryna Shymanovich	211	6
CAN	Carol Zhao	222	7
CAN	Stacey Fung	238	8

- Rankings are as of 15 January 2024.

=== Other entrants ===
The following players received wildcards into the singles main draw:

- (United States) Hailey Baptiste
- (United States) Clervie Ngounoue

The following player received entry into the singles main draw using a junior exempt:

- (United States) Madison Sieg

The following players received entry from the qualifying draw:

- (United States) Sara Daavettila
- (United States) Dalayna Hewitt
- (Chinese Taipei) Hsu Chieh-yu
- (United States) Elizabeth Ionescu
- (France) Tiphanie Lemaître
- (United States) Ava Markham
- (United States) Victoria Osuigwe
- (Ukraine) Khrystyna Vozniak
