= 2023 Calgary National Bank Challenger – Women's singles =

Women's singles
- 2023 Calgary National Bank Challenger

Final
- Champion: (Germany) Sabine Lisicki
- Runner-up: (Canada) Stacey Fung
- Score: 7–6^{(7–2)}, 6–7^{(5–7)}, 6–3

Events
Singles	men	women
Doubles	men	women
- Calgary Challenger

Sabine Lisicki defeated Stacey Fung in the final, 7–6^{(7–2)}, 6–7^{(5–7)}, 6–3 to win the singles title at the 2023 Calgary Challenger.

Robin Montgomery was the defending champion but chose not to participate.

== Seeds ==
1. (Canada) Katherine Sebov (second round)
2. (Australia) Arina Rodionova (quarterfinals)
3. (Switzerland) Lulu Sun (quarterfinals)
4. (Netherlands) Lesley Pattinama Kerkhove (second round)
5. (Canada) Stacey Fung (final)
6. (Lithuania) Justina Mikulskytė (first round)
7. (United States) Jamie Loeb (semifinals)
8. (United States) Liv Hovde (quarterfinals)

== Draw ==
Key

- Q = Qualifier
- WC = Wild card
- LL = Lucky loser
- Alt = Alternate
- ITF = ITF entry
- PR = Protected ranking
- SR = Special ranking
- SE = Special exempt
- JE = Junior exempt
- JR = Junior Accelerator Programme entrant
- CO = College Accelerator Programme entrant
- NG = Next Gen Accelerator Program entrant
- w/o = Walkover
- r = Retired
- d = Defaulted

=== Finals ===
Semifinals
7	(United States) Jamie Loeb	1	2
(Germany) Sabine Lisicki	6	6
5	(Canada) Stacey Fung	6	6
(Poland) Urszula Radwańska	1	3

Final
(Germany) Sabine Lisicki	7^{7}	6^{5}	6
5	(Canada) Stacey Fung	6^{2}	7^{7}	3

=== Top half ===
First round
1	(Canada) K Sebov	6	6
LL	(Japan) N Hanatani	1	0
(United States) D Hewitt	6	2	6
(Canada) C Brace	2	6	2
(United Kingdom) E Silva	6	6
WC	(Canada) M Ostrzygalo	2	0
(United States) H Chang	4	3
7	(United States) J Loeb	6	6
4	(Netherlands) L Pattinama Kerkhove	6	6
(Greece) M Matoula	2	4
(Germany) S Lisicki	7^{7}	7
Q	(Serbia) K Jokić	6^{4}	5
WC	(Canada) A Jacobs	7	6
Q	(United States) A Zamarripa	5	3
(United States) H Giavara	1	7^{7}	0
8	(United States) L Hovde	6	6^{5}	6

Second round
1	(Canada) K Sebov	4	6	6^{3}
(United States) D Hewitt	6	3	7^{7}
(United Kingdom) E Silva	6	4	5
7	(United States) J Loeb	4	6	7
4	(Netherlands) L Pattinama Kerkhove	3	6	2
(Germany) S Lisicki	6	3	6
WC	(Canada) A Jacobs	2	6	6^{4}
8	(United States) L Hovde	6	4	7^{7}

Quarterfinals
(United States) D Hewitt	2	5
7	(United States) J Loeb	6	7
(Germany) S Lisicki	6	6^{3}	6
8	(United States) L Hovde	3	7^{7}	3

Semifinals
7	(United States) J Loeb	1	2
(Germany) S Lisicki	6	6

=== Bottom half ===
First round
5	(Canada) S Fung	6	6
Q	(France) C Roméo	4	1
Q	(Canada) I Boulais	6^{1}	1
(United Kingdom) SB Grey	7^{7}	6
Q	(United States) A Zhu	4	3
Q	(Slovakia) M Okáľová	6	6
(United States) R Anderson	5	6	4
3	(Switzerland) L Sun	7	2	6
6	(Lithuania) J Mikulskytė	6	3	4
(Poland) U Radwańska	4	6	6
WC	(Canada) L Sleeth	4	4
Q	K Pavlova	6	6
(United States) M Sieg	3	6	6
WC	(Canada) K Cross	6	4	4
Q	(United States) K McKenzie	1^{r}
2	(Australia) Ar Rodionova	2

Second round
5	(Canada) S Fung	6	7
(United Kingdom) SB Grey	2	5
Q	(Slovakia) M Okáľová	3	3
3	(Switzerland) L Sun	6	6
(Poland) U Radwańska	5	6	6
Q	K Pavlova	7	4	3
(United States) M Sieg	3	1
2	(Australia) Ar Rodionova	6	6

Quarterfinals
5	(Canada) S Fung	6	4	6
3	(Switzerland) L Sun	0	6	3
(Poland) U Radwańska	6	6
2	(Australia) Ar Rodionova	1	3

Semifinals
5	(Canada) S Fung	6	6
(Poland) U Radwańska	1	3
