= 2023 Georgia's Rome Tennis Open 2 – Doubles =

Doubles
- 2023 Georgia's Rome Tennis Open 2

Final
- Champions: (United States) Sofia Sewing; Anastasia Tikhonova
- Runners-up: (United States) Robin Anderson (Mexico) Fernanda Contreras
- Score: 4–6, 6–3, [10–7]

Events
Singles	Doubles
← 2023 ·	Georgia's Rome Tennis Open	· 2024 →

Fanny Stollár and Lulu Sun were the defending champions, but both chose not to participate.

Sofia Sewing and Anastasia Tikhonova won the title after defeating Robin Anderson and Fernanda Contreras 4–6, 6–3, 10–7 in the final.

== Seeds ==
1. (United States) Sofia Sewing / Anastasia Tikhonova (champions)
2. (United States) Dalayna Hewitt / (United States) Jamie Loeb (quarterfinals, withdrew)
3. (United States) Robin Anderson / (Mexico) Fernanda Contreras (final)
4. (United States) Anna Rogers / (United States) Alana Smith (semifinals)

== Draw ==
=== Key ===
- Q = Qualifier
- WC = Wild card
- LL = Lucky loser
- Alt = Alternate
- SE = Special exempt
- PR = Protected ranking
- ITF = ITF entry
- JE = Junior exempt
- w/o = Walkover
- r = Retired
- d = Defaulted
- SR = Special ranking

=== Draw ===
First round
1	(United States) S Sewing; A Tikhonova	6	6
T Prozorova (United States) A Ukaegbu	3	0
(United States) S Ewing (United States) M Yamakita	6	4	[8]
(Canada) L Kwong (United States) L Proctor	3	6	[10]
4	(United States) A Rogers (United States) A Smith	6	6
(United States) M Kessler (United States) W Osuigwe	2	3
(United States) C Beck (United States) C Rosca	6	6
(United States) J Cantrell (United States) E Lella	2	0
(United States) S Daavettila (Serbia) K Kozarov	6	6
(Chinese Taipei) C-y Hsu (India) S Yamalapalli	4	2
(United States) V Hu (Japan) H Kuwata	2	4
3	(United States) R Anderson (Mexico) F Contreras	6	6
(Poland) O Lincer (United States) R McAdoo	6	6
Alt	(United States) A Clemons (United States) A Crump	0	2
(Canada) S Fung (United States) G Min	5	3
2	(United States) D Hewitt (United States) J Loeb	7	6

Quarterfinals
1	(United States) S Sewing; A Tikhonova	6	6
(Canada) L Kwong (United States) L Proctor	4	1
4	(United States) A Rogers (United States) A Smith	6	6
(United States) C Beck (United States) C Rosca	1	4
(United States) S Daavettila (Serbia) K Kozarov	6^{9}	6	[6]
3	(United States) R Anderson (Mexico) F Contreras	7^{11}	2	[10]
(Poland) O Lincer (United States) R McAdoo	w/o
2	(United States) D Hewitt (United States) J Loeb

Semifinals
1	(United States) S Sewing; A Tikhonova	6	3	[10]
4	(United States) A Rogers (United States) A Smith	4	6	[3]
3	(United States) R Anderson (Mexico) F Contreras	6	6
(Poland) O Lincer (United States) R McAdoo	4	3

Final
1	(United States) S Sewing; A Tikhonova	4	6	[10]
3	(United States) R Anderson (Mexico) F Contreras	6	3	[7]
