= 2018 Calgary National Bank Challenger – Singles =

Singles
- 2018 Calgary National Bank Challenger

Final
- Champion: (Croatia) Ivo Karlović
- Runner-up: (Australia) Jordan Thompson
- Score: 7–6^{(7–3)}, 6–3

Events
Singles	Doubles
Calgary National Bank Challenger	· 2020 →

This was the first edition of the tournament.

Ivo Karlović won the title after defeating Jordan Thompson 7–6^{(7–3)}, 6–3 in the final.

== Seeds ==
1. (Australia) Jordan Thompson (final)
2. (Croatia) Ivo Karlović (champion)
3. (Chinese Taipei) Jason Jung (second round)
4. (Spain) Adrián Menéndez Maceiras (second round)
5. (Norway) Casper Ruud (semifinals)
6. (Australia) Alex Bolt (withdrew)
7. (United Kingdom) Jay Clarke (first round)
8. (Ecuador) Roberto Quiroz (quarterfinals)

== Draw ==
=== Key ===
- Q = Qualifier
- WC = Wild card
- LL = Lucky loser
- Alt = Alternate
- SE = Special exempt
- PR = Protected ranking
- ITF = ITF entry
- JE = Junior exempt
- w/o = Walkover
- r = Retired
- d = Defaulted
- SR = Special ranking

=== Finals ===
Semifinals
1	(Australia) Jordan Thompson	6^{5}	6	7^{7}
5	(Norway) Casper Ruud	7^{7}	0	6^{4}
Q	(Croatia) Borna Gojo	6^{3}	6^{2}
2	(Croatia) Ivo Karlović	7^{7}	7^{7}

Final
1	(Australia) Jordan Thompson	6^{3}	3
2	(Croatia) Ivo Karlović	7^{7}	6

=== Top half ===
First round
1	(Australia) J Thompson	6	7^{7}
LL	(France) Laurent Rochette	2	6^{5}
WC	(Canada) A Galarneau	6	6
Q	(Spain) Pablo Vivero González	2	4
(France) E Couacaud	6	4	6
(Spain) R Ortega Olmedo	2	6	3
(Australia) J-P Smith	7^{7}	7^{7}
Q	(United States) T Fawcett	6^{4}	6^{3}
4	(Spain) A Menéndez Maceiras	4	7	7
(United States) K King	6	5	5
(Canada) B Schnur	4	6	6
(Spain) T Robredo	6	1	4
Alt	(United States) S Kozlov	3	3
(Germany) J Choinski	6	6
(Colombia) A González	6	5	6^{3}
5	(Norway) C Ruud	3	7	7^{7}

Second round
1	(Australia) J Thompson	6	6
WC	(Canada) A Galarneau	2	0
(France) E Couacaud	7	7
(Australia) J-P Smith	5	5
4	(Spain) A Menéndez Maceiras	6	2	6^{4}
(Canada) B Schnur	4	6	7^{7}
(Germany) J Choinski	3	2
5	(Norway) C Ruud	6	6

Quarterfinals
1	(Australia) J Thompson	6	6
(France) E Couacaud	3	4
(Canada) B Schnur	6	3	4
5	(Norway) C Ruud	4	6	6

Semifinals
1	(Australia) J Thompson	6^{5}	6	7^{7}
5	(Norway) C Ruud	7^{7}	0	6^{4}

=== Bottom half ===
First round
7	(United Kingdom) J Clarke	5	0
(United States) C Altamirano	7	6
WC	(Canada) Pavel Krainik	4	6	3
(Canada) F Peliwo	6	3	6
WC	(Canada) Harrison Scott	0	1
Q	(Croatia) B Gojo	6	6
WC	(Canada) S Diez	3	7^{7}	3
3	(Chinese Taipei) J Jung	6	6^{0}	6
8	(Ecuador) R Quiroz	1	7	6
Q	(France) V Millot	6	5	1
Alt	(Turkey) C İlkel	7	7
(Croatia) N Serdarušić	5	5
(France) M Bourgue	6^{3}	6	6
(Japan) K Uchida	7^{7}	2	2
(United States) E King	6^{5}	7^{8}	6^{3}
2	(Croatia) I Karlović	7^{7}	6^{6}	7^{7}

Second round
(United States) C Altamirano	7	6^{6}	1
(Canada) F Peliwo	5	7^{8}	6
Q	(Croatia) B Gojo	7^{7}	6
3	(Chinese Taipei) J Jung	6^{2}	2
8	(Ecuador) R Quiroz	6	6
Alt	(Turkey) C İlkel	4	3
(France) M Bourgue	6^{4}	6	3
2	(Croatia) I Karlović	7^{7}	4	6

Quarterfinals
(Canada) F Peliwo	0	3
Q	(Croatia) B Gojo	6	6
8	(Ecuador) R Quiroz	6^{4}	6	6^{4}
2	(Croatia) I Karlović	7^{7}	4	7^{7}

Semifinals
Q	(Croatia) B Gojo	6^{3}	6^{2}
2	(Croatia) I Karlović	7^{7}	7^{7}
