= 2022 Calgary National Bank Challenger – Men's singles =

Men's singles
- 2022 Calgary National Bank Challenger

Final
- Champion: (Germany) Dominik Koepfer
- Runner-up: (Australia) Aleksandar Vukic
- Score: 6–2, 6–4

Events
Singles	men	women
Doubles	men	women
- Calgary National Bank Challenger

Arthur Rinderknech was the defending champion but chose not to defend his title.

Dominik Koepfer won the title after defeating Aleksandar Vukic 6–2, 6–4 in the final.

== Seeds ==
1. (Ecuador) Emilio Gómez (first round)
2. (Canada) Vasek Pospisil (quarterfinals)
3. (Argentina) Juan Pablo Ficovich (second round)
4. (Australia) Aleksandar Vukic (final)
5. (Germany) Dominik Koepfer (champion)
6. (France) Antoine Escoffier (quarterfinals)
7. (United States) Brandon Holt (first round)
8. (Canada) Alexis Galarneau (quarterfinals)

== Draw ==
Key

- Q = Qualifier
- WC = Wild card
- LL = Lucky loser
- Alt = Alternate
- ITF = ITF entry
- PR = Protected ranking
- SR = Special ranking
- SE = Special exempt
- JE = Junior exempt
- JR = Junior Accelerator Programme entrant
- CO = College Accelerator Programme entrant
- NG = Next Gen Accelerator Program entrant
- w/o = Walkover
- r = Retired
- d = Defaulted

=== Finals ===
Semifinals
5	(Germany) Dominik Koepfer	7^{7}	6
(Canada) Gabriel Diallo	6^{2}	1
4	(Australia) Aleksandar Vukic	7	7^{7}
Q	(Poland) Maks Kaśnikowski	5	6^{2}

Final
5	(Germany) Dominik Koepfer	6	6
4	(Australia) Aleksandar Vukic	2	4

=== Top half ===
First round
1	(Ecuador) E Gómez	6	5	1
(France) H Mayot	3	7	6
Alt	(Tunisia) M Jaziri	6	6^{3}	2
Q	(Greece) M Pervolarakis	3	7^{7}	6
WC	(Canada) C Harper	7^{7}	3	6
Alt	(Germany) MH Rehberg	6^{4}	6	4
(United States) N Chappell	2	6^{4}
5	(Germany) D Koepfer	6	7^{7}
3	(Argentina) JP Ficovich	7^{7}	6
(Tunisia) A Dougaz	6^{2}	2
(Canada) G Diallo	7^{7}	6
PR	(Italy) J Ocleppo	6^{2}	4
Q	(Germany) J Härteis	5	4
(Brazil) G Décamps	7	6
WC	(Canada) J Boulais	3	3
6	(France) A Escoffier	6	6

Second round
(France) H Mayot	6	6
Q	(Greece) M Pervolarakis	4	0
WC	(Canada) C Harper	4	1
5	(Germany) D Koepfer	6	6
3	(Argentina) JP Ficovich	3	2
(Canada) G Diallo	6	6
(Brazil) G Décamps	5	3
6	(France) A Escoffier	7	6

Quarterfinals
(France) H Mayot	6^{0}	6	3
5	(Germany) D Koepfer	7^{7}	3	6
(Canada) G Diallo	6	5	7
6	(France) A Escoffier	3	7	5

Semifinals
5	(Germany) D Koepfer	7^{7}	6
(Canada) G Diallo	6^{2}	1

=== Bottom half ===
First round
8	(Canada) A Galarneau	7^{8}	6
Q	(Austria) M Neuchrist	6^{6}	1
WC	(Canada) Jaden Weekes	2	4
(Tunisia) S Mansouri	6	6
(United Kingdom) C Broom	3	6	6
Q	(United Kingdom) A Fery	6	3	4
(Zimbabwe) B Lock	2	1
4	(Australia) A Vukic	6	6
7	(United States) B Holt	4	6	5
Q	(Poland) M Kaśnikowski	6	3	7
Q	(United States) A Perez	6	6
(Israel) E Leshem	4	4
(Belgium) M Geerts	4	6	1
(Monaco) V Vacherot	6	4	6
(United States) E Zhu	3	4
2	(Canada) V Pospisil	6	6

Second round
8	(Canada) A Galarneau	6	6
(Tunisia) S Mansouri	3	4
(United Kingdom) C Broom	6	4	3
4	(Australia) A Vukic	4	6	6
Q	(Poland) M Kaśnikowski	6	6
Q	(United States) A Perez	4	4
(Monaco) V Vacherot	6^{3}	3
2	(Canada) V Pospisil	7^{7}	6

Quarterfinals
8	(Canada) A Galarneau	3	6^{4}
4	(Australia) A Vukic	6	7^{7}
Q	(Poland) M Kaśnikowski	7^{9}	6
2	(Canada) V Pospisil	6^{7}	3

Semifinals
4	(Australia) A Vukic	7	7^{7}
Q	(Poland) M Kaśnikowski	5	6^{2}
