= 2023 Calgary National Bank Challenger – Men's singles =

Men's singles
- 2023 Calgary National Bank Challenger

Final
- Champion: (Canada) Liam Draxl
- Runner-up: (Germany) Dominik Koepfer
- Score: 6–4, 6–3

Events
| Singles | men | women |
| Doubles | men | women |
- Calgary National Bank Challenger

Dominik Koepfer was the defending champion but lost in the final to Liam Draxl.

Draxl won the title after defeating Koepfer 6–4, 6–3 in the final.

== Seeds ==
1. (Germany) Dominik Koepfer (final)
2. (Australia) James Duckworth (second round)
3. (France) Benoît Paire (first round)
4. (Canada) Gabriel Diallo (semifinals, withdrew)
5. (United Kingdom) Ryan Peniston (first round)
6. (Belgium) Zizou Bergs (quarterfinals)
7. (Belgium) Kimmer Coppejans (first round)
8. (Tunisia) Aziz Dougaz (quarterfinals)

== Draw ==
Key

- Q = Qualifier
- WC = Wild card
- LL = Lucky loser
- Alt = Alternate
- ITF = ITF entry
- PR = Protected ranking
- SR = Special ranking
- SE = Special exempt
- JE = Junior exempt
- JR = Junior Accelerator Programme entrant
- CO = College Accelerator Programme entrant
- NG = Next Gen Accelerator Program entrant
- w/o = Walkover
- r = Retired
- d = Defaulted

=== Finals ===
Semifinals
1 | (Germany) Dominik Koepfer | w/o
4 | (Canada) Gabriel Diallo
(United States) Andres Martin | 6^{5} | 7 | 3
WC | (Canada) Liam Draxl | 7^{7} | 5 | 6

Final
1 | (Germany) Dominik Koepfer | 4 | 3
WC | (Canada) Liam Draxl | 6 | 6

=== Top half ===
First round
1 | (Germany) D Koepfer | 6 | 6
(United Kingdom) C Broom | 2 | 3
(France) C Chidekh | 6 | 6
(Czech Republic) M Vrbenský | 4 | 2
Q | (New Zealand) K Pannu | 6 | 6
(Spain) D Jordà Sanchis | 1 | 4
(Zimbabwe) B Lock | 7^{7} | 3 | 3
6 | (Belgium) Z Bergs | 6^{3} | 6 | 6
4 | (Canada) G Diallo | 4 | 7^{10} | 6
(Czech Republic) A Paulson | 6 | 6^{8} | 4
Q | (United Kingdom) Patrick Brady | 7 | 4 | 2
(Portugal) J Sousa | 5 | 6 | 6
Q | (Canada) JC Aguilar | 3 | 6 | 3
(Canada) S Diez | 6 | 1 | 6
WC | (Canada) D Martin | 2 | 5
8 | (Tunisia) A Dougaz | 6 | 7

Second round
1 | (Germany) D Koepfer | 6 | 6
(France) C Chidekh | 3 | 3
Q | (New Zealand) K Pannu | 4 | 5
6 | (Belgium) Z Bergs | 6 | 7
4 | (Canada) G Diallo | 5 | 7 | 6
(Portugal) J Sousa | 7 | 5 | 3
(Canada) S Diez | 3 | 2
8 | (Tunisia) A Dougaz | 6 | 6

Quarterfinals
1 | (Germany) D Koepfer | 6 | 6
6 | (Belgium) Z Bergs | 1 | 3
4 | (Canada) G Diallo | 6 | 6
8 | (Tunisia) A Dougaz | 3 | 2

Semifinals
1 | (Germany) D Koepfer | w/o
4 | (Canada) G Diallo

=== Bottom half ===
First round
5 | (United Kingdom) R Peniston | 3 | 4
(United States) A Martin | 6 | 6
(United Kingdom) T Samuel | 7^{8} | 7^{10}
Q | (United States) R Seggerman | 6^{6} | 6^{8}
Q | (France) Enzo Wallart | 1 | 7 | 6
(Norway) V Durasovic | 6 | 5 | 3
(Poland) M Kaśnikowski | 6 | 6^{3} | 6
3 | (France) B Paire | 3 | 7^{7} | 3
7 | (Belgium) K Coppejans | 4 | 1
WC | (Canada) L Draxl | 6 | 6
(Australia) L Saville | 7^{9} | 4 | 6
(Australia) T Schoolkate | 6^{7} | 6 | 3
Q | (Spain) I Montes de la Torre | 6 | 6
WC | (Canada) J Boulais | 4 | 1
(Australia) L Tu | 2 | 4
2 | (Australia) J Duckworth | 6 | 6

Second round
(United States) A Martin | 7 | 6
(United Kingdom) T Samuel | 5 | 4
Q | (France) E Wallart | 7^{11} | 7^{7}
(Poland) M Kaśnikowski | 6^{9} | 6^{4}
WC | (Canada) L Draxl | 6 | 6
(Australia) L Saville | 1 | 2
Q | (Spain) I Montes de la Torre | 6 | 6
2 | (Australia) J Duckworth | 3 | 2

Quarterfinals
(United States) A Martin | 6 | 6
Q | (France) E Wallart | 1 | 1
WC | (Canada) L Draxl | 7 | 5 | 6
Q | (Spain) I Montes de la Torre | 5 | 7 | 1

Semifinals
(United States) A Martin | 6^{5} | 7 | 3
WC | (Canada) L Draxl | 7^{7} | 5 | 6
