= 2018 Calgary National Bank Challenger =

- Date: 15–21 October
- Edition: 1st
- Surface: Hard (indoor)
- Location: Calgary, Canada

Champions

Singles
- (Croatia) Ivo Karlović

Doubles
- (United States) Robert Galloway / (United States) Nathan Pasha
- Calgary National Bank Challenger

The 2018 Calgary National Bank Challenger was a professional tennis tournament played on indoor hard courts. It was the first edition of the tournament and part of the 2018 ATP Challenger Tour. It took place in Calgary, Canada.

== Singles entrants ==
=== Seeds ===
Country	Player	Rank	Seed
AUS	Jordan Thompson	105	1
CRO	Ivo Karlović	117	2
TPE	Jason Jung	123	3
ESP	Adrián Menéndez Maceiras	132	4
NOR	Casper Ruud	137	5
~~AUS~~	~~Alex Bolt~~	~~155~~	~~6~~
GBR	Jay Clarke	177	7
ECU	Roberto Quiroz	190	8

=== Other entrants ===
The following players received wildcards into the singles main draw:

- (Canada) Steven Diez
- (Canada) Alexis Galarneau
- (Canada) Pavel Krainik
- (Canada) Harrison Scott

The following players received entry into the singles main draw as alternates:

- (Turkey) Cem İlkel
- (United States) Stefan Kozlov

The following players received entry from the qualifying draw:

- (United States) Tom Fawcett
- (Croatia) Borna Gojo
- (France) Vincent Millot
- (Spain) Pablo Vivero González

The following player received entry as a lucky loser:

- (France) Laurent Rochette

== Champions ==
=== Singles ===
- (Croatia) Ivo Karlović def. (Australia) Jordan Thompson 7–6^{(7–3)}, 6–3.

=== Doubles ===
- (United States) Robert Galloway / (United States) Nathan Pasha def. (Australia) Matt Reid / (Australia) John-Patrick Smith 6–4, 4–6, [10–6].
