= 2018 Calgary National Bank Challenger – Doubles =

Doubles
- 2018 Calgary National Bank Challenger

Final
- Champions: (United States) Robert Galloway (United States) Nathan Pasha
- Runners-up: (Australia) Matt Reid (Australia) John-Patrick Smith
- Score: 6–4, 4–6, [10–6]

Events
Singles	Doubles
Calgary National Bank Challenger	· 2020 →

This was the first edition of the tournament.

Robert Galloway and Nathan Pasha won the title after defeating Matt Reid and John-Patrick Smith 6–4, 4–6, [10–6] in the final.

== Seeds ==
1. (Australia) Matt Reid / (Australia) John-Patrick Smith (final)
2. (United States) Robert Galloway / (United States) Nathan Pasha (champions)
3. (Philippines) Ruben Gonzales / (United States) Nathaniel Lammons (semifinals)
4. (United States) Hunter Reese / (Canada) Adil Shamasdin (quarterfinals)

== Draw ==
=== Key ===
- Q = Qualifier
- WC = Wild card
- LL = Lucky loser
- Alt = Alternate
- SE = Special exempt
- PR = Protected ranking
- ITF = ITF entry
- JE = Junior exempt
- w/o = Walkover
- r = Retired
- d = Defaulted
- SR = Special ranking

First round
1	(Australia) M Reid (Australia) J-P Smith	7^{7}	6^{4}	[10]
(Mexico) H Hach Verdugo (Sweden) A Siljeström	6^{4}	7^{7}	[1]
(Colombia) A Gómez (Colombia) A González	6	2	[12]
(United States) H Johnson (United States) Y Johnson	3	6	[10]
4	(United States) H Reese (Canada) A Shamasdin	7	6
(Japan) T Matsui (Netherlands) S Verbeek	5	3
(Venezuela) LD Martínez (Ecuador) R Quiroz	7^{8}	7^{7}
(Brazil) Caio Silva (Brazil) T Turini	6^{6}	6^{4}
WC	(Canada) S Diez (Canada) A Galarneau	6	3	[10]
(Turkey) C İlkel (Spain) R Ortega Olmedo	1	6	[8]
(Germany) J Choinski (Croatia) N Serdarušić	6^{2}	2
3	(Philippines) R Gonzales (United States) N Lammons	7^{7}	6
(Chinese Taipei) J Jung (United States) E King	6	6
WC	(United States) T Fawcett (Japan) K Uchida	3	4
WC	(Canada) Pavel Krainik (France) Laurent Rochette	5	4
2	(United States) R Galloway (United States) N Pasha	7	6

Quarterfinals
1	(Australia) M Reid (Australia) J-P Smith	6	7
(Colombia) A Gómez (Colombia) A González	3	5
4	(United States) H Reese (Canada) A Shamasdin	6^{3}	6	[8]
(Venezuela) LD Martínez (Ecuador) R Quiroz	7^{7}	4	[10]
WC	(Canada) S Diez (Canada) A Galarneau	6	1	[6]
3	(Philippines) R Gonzales (United States) N Lammons	3	6	[10]
(Chinese Taipei) J Jung (United States) E King	3	4
2	(United States) R Galloway (United States) N Pasha	6	6

Semifinals
1	(Australia) M Reid (Australia) J-P Smith	6	6
(Venezuela) LD Martínez (Ecuador) R Quiroz	3	3
3	(Philippines) R Gonzales (United States) N Lammons	6	2	[10]
2	(United States) R Galloway (United States) N Pasha	3	6	[12]

Final
1	(Australia) M Reid (Australia) J-P Smith	4	6	[6]
2	(United States) R Galloway (United States) N Pasha	6	4	[10]
