= 2024 Georgia's Rome Tennis Open – Doubles =

Doubles
- 2024 Georgia's Rome Tennis Open

Final
- Champions: (United States) Angela Kulikov (United States) Jamie Loeb
- Runners-up: (United States) Hailey Baptiste (United States) Whitney Osuigwe
- Score: Walkover

Events
Singles	Doubles
← 2023 ·	Georgia's Rome Tennis Open	· 2025 →

Sofia Sewing and Anastasia Tikhonova were the defending champions but Tikhonova chose not to participate. Sewing partnered alongside Veronika Miroshnichenko, but lost in the quarterfinals to Isabelle Haverlag and Anna Rogers.

Angela Kulikov and Jamie Loeb won the title after Hailey Baptiste and Whitney Osuigwe withdrew from the final.

== Seeds ==
1. (United States) Sophie Chang / (United States) Dalayna Hewitt (quarterfinals)
2. (United States) Angela Kulikov / (United States) Jamie Loeb (champions)
3. (United States) Hailey Baptiste / (United States) Whitney Osuigwe (final)
4. Veronika Miroshnichenko / (United States) Sofia Sewing (quarterfinals)

== Draw ==
=== Key ===
- Q = Qualifier
- WC = Wild card
- LL = Lucky loser
- Alt = Alternate
- SE = Special exempt
- PR = Protected ranking
- ITF = ITF entry
- JE = Junior exempt
- w/o = Walkover
- r = Retired
- d = Defaulted
- SR = Special ranking

First round
1	(United States) S Chang (United States) D Hewitt	6	6
(United States) R Anderson (Mexico) F Contreras	3	2
(United States) R Montgomery (United States) C Ngounoue	7	6
(United States) A Markham (United States) M Sieg	5	2
3	(United States) H Baptiste (United States) W Osuigwe	6	6
WC	(Chinese Taipei) C-y Hsu (United States) M Yamakita	3	2
(United States) V Osuigwe (United States) A Smith	6	6
(United States) C Corley (United States) I Corley	2	3
(Netherlands) I Haverlag (United States) A Rogers	6	6
(Czech Republic) M Bayerlová (Belgium) S Costoulas	4	3
(Brazil) L Fullana (Colombia) M Herazo González	6	3	[6]
4	V Miroshnichenko (United States) S Sewing	0	6	[10]
(United States) A Li; I Shymanovich	6	4	[11]
WC	(United States) S Daavettila (United States) V Flores	1	6	[13]
WC	(Georgia (country)) A Bochoradze (Israel) N Gelashvili	0	2
2	(United States) A Kulikov (United States) J Loeb	6	6

Quarterfinals
1	(United States) S Chang (United States) D Hewitt	1	7	[5]
(United States) R Montgomery (United States) C Ngounoue	6	5	[10]
3	(United States) H Baptiste (United States) W Osuigwe	6	1	[10]
(United States) V Osuigwe (United States) A Smith	2	6	[8]
(Netherlands) I Haverlag (United States) A Rogers	4	6	[10]
4	V Miroshnichenko (United States) S Sewing	6	2	[7]
WC	(United States) S Daavettila (United States) V Flores	4	3
2	(United States) A Kulikov (United States) J Loeb	6	6

Semifinals
(United States) R Montgomery (United States) C Ngounoue	1	2
3	(United States) H Baptiste (United States) W Osuigwe	6	6
(Netherlands) I Haverlag (United States) A Rogers	4	4
2	(United States) A Kulikov (United States) J Loeb	6	6

Final
3	(United States) H Baptiste (United States) W Osuigwe
2	(United States) A Kulikov (United States) J Loeb	w/o
