= 2023 Calgary National Bank Challenger – Men's doubles =

Men's doubles
- 2023 Calgary National Bank Challenger

Final
- Champions: (Canada) Juan Carlos Aguilar (Canada) Justin Boulais
- Runners-up: (United Kingdom) Charles Broom (United Kingdom) Ben Jones
- Score: 6–3, 6–2

Events
Singles	men	women
Doubles	men	women
- Calgary National Bank Challenger

Maximilian Neuchrist and Michail Pervolarakis were the defending champions but chose not to defend their title.

Juan Carlos Aguilar and Justin Boulais won the title after defeating Charles Broom and Ben Jones 6–3, 6–2 in the final.

== Seeds ==
1. (Poland) Piotr Matuszewski / (Germany) Kai Wehnelt (first round)
2. (United States) George Goldhoff / (United States) Alfredo Perez (quarterfinals)
3. (Czech Republic) Andrew Paulson / (Czech Republic) Michael Vrbenský (first round)
4. (United Kingdom) Scott Duncan / (Canada) Kelsey Stevenson (quarterfinals)

== Draw ==
Key

- Q = Qualifier
- WC = Wild card
- LL = Lucky loser
- Alt = Alternate
- ITF = ITF entry
- PR = Protected ranking
- SR = Special ranking
- SE = Special exempt
- JE = Junior exempt
- JR = Junior Accelerator Programme entrant
- CO = College Accelerator Programme entrant
- NG = Next Gen Accelerator Program entrant
- w/o = Walkover
- r = Retired
- d = Defaulted

First round
1	(Poland) P Matuszewski (Germany) K Wehnelt	6^{2}	6^{4}
(Australia) L Saville (Australia) L Tu	7^{7}	7^{7}
Alt	(Canada) L Draxl (Canada) Nicaise Muamba	5	6^{6}
(United States) R Seggerman (United States) P Trhac	7	7^{8}
3	(Czech Republic) A Paulson (Czech Republic) M Vrbenský	6	4	[2]
(United Kingdom) C Broom (United Kingdom) B Jones	4	6	[10]
(Canada) S Diez (Portugal) J Sousa	6	7^{8}
(France) B Paire (New Zealand) A Sitak	4	6^{6}
Alt	(Norway) V Durasovic (Spain) D Jordà Sanchis	1	2
(Belgium) Z Bergs (Canada) G Diallo	6	6
(Tunisia) A Dougaz (Zimbabwe) B Lock	2	3
4	(United Kingdom) S Duncan (Canada) K Stevenson	6	6
(United States) H Reese (Canada) B Sigouin	6^{5}	6^{4}
WC	(Canada) JC Aguilar (Canada) J Boulais	7^{7}	7^{7}
(United Kingdom) G Hussey (Australia) T Schoolkate	7	4	[5]
2	(United States) G Goldhoff (United States) A Perez	5	6	[10]

Quarterfinals
(Australia) L Saville (Australia) L Tu	7^{8}	6
(United States) R Seggerman (United States) P Trhac	6^{6}	4
(United Kingdom) C Broom (United Kingdom) B Jones	7^{7}	6
(Canada) S Diez (Portugal) J Sousa	6^{4}	2
(Belgium) Z Bergs (Canada) G Diallo	7^{7}	6^{9}	[10]
4	(United Kingdom) S Duncan (Canada) K Stevenson	6^{4}	7^{11}	[5]
WC	(Canada) JC Aguilar (Canada) J Boulais	3	7^{7}	[10]
2	(United States) G Goldhoff (United States) A Perez	6	6^{3}	[7]

Semifinals
(Australia) L Saville (Australia) L Tu	4	0
(United Kingdom) C Broom (United Kingdom) B Jones	6	6
(Belgium) Z Bergs (Canada) G Diallo
WC	(Canada) JC Aguilar (Canada) J Boulais	w/o

Final
(United Kingdom) C Broom (United Kingdom) B Jones	3	2
WC	(Canada) JC Aguilar (Canada) J Boulais	6	6
