= 2023 Calgary National Bank Challenger – Women's doubles =

Women's doubles
- 2023 Calgary National Bank Challenger

Final
- Champions: (United Kingdom) Sarah Beth Grey (United Kingdom) Eden Silva
- Runners-up: (United States) Hanna Chang (Serbia) Katarina Jokić
- Score: 6–4, 6–4

Events
Singles	men	women
Doubles	men	women
- Calgary Challenger

Catherine Harrison and Sabrina Santamaria were the defending champions but Santamaria participate at Charleston and Harrison chose not to participate.

Sarah Beth Grey and Eden Silva won the title, defeating Hanna Chang and Katarina Jokić in the final, 6–4, 6–4.

== Seeds ==
1. (United States) Jamie Loeb / (Australia) Alexandra Osborne (first round)
2. (United States) Robin Anderson / (United States) Dalayna Hewitt (quarterfinals)
3. (United Kingdom) Sarah Beth Grey / (United Kingdom) Eden Silva (champions)
4. (Canada) Kayla Cross / (Lithuania) Justina Mikulskytė (semifinals)

== Draw ==
Key

- Q = Qualifier
- WC = Wild card
- LL = Lucky loser
- Alt = Alternate
- ITF = ITF entry
- PR = Protected ranking
- SR = Special ranking
- SE = Special exempt
- JE = Junior exempt
- JR = Junior Accelerator Programme entrant
- CO = College Accelerator Programme entrant
- NG = Next Gen Accelerator Program entrant
- w/o = Walkover
- r = Retired
- d = Defaulted

=== Draw ===
First round
1	(United States) J Loeb (Australia) A Osborne	4	3
(United States) H Chang (Serbia) K Jokić	6	6
(Japan) M Ayukawa (United States) A Zhu	4	2
(Greece) M Matoula (Slovakia) M Okáľová	6	6
4	(Canada) K Cross (Lithuania) J Mikulskytė	6	6
(Canada) C Brace (United States) S Daavettila	0	2
(United States) C Corley (United States) I Corley	6^{6}	6	[10]
(United States) L Hovde (United States) M Sieg	7^{8}	1	[5]
(Canada) T Chavez (Canada) A Jacobs	4	6	[10]
(Canada) S Nicholson (Canada) M Ostrzygalo	6	4	[8]
(Canada) I Boulais (Canada) L Sleeth	3	1
3	(United Kingdom) SB Grey (United Kingdom) E Silva	6	6
(United States) A Zamarripa (United States) M Zamarripa	6	4	[6]
(United States) H Giavara; K Pavlova	4	6	[10]
(Canada) L Kwong (United States) A Ulyashchenko	4	6^{10}
2	(United States) R Anderson (United States) D Hewitt	6	7^{12}

Quarterfinals
(United States) H Chang (Serbia) K Jokić	6	6
(Greece) M Matoula (Slovakia) M Okáľová	2	4
4	(Canada) K Cross (Lithuania) J Mikulskytė	6	2	[10]
(United States) C Corley (United States) I Corley	3	6	[7]
(Canada) T Chavez (Canada) A Jacobs	4	6	[7]
3	(United Kingdom) SB Grey (United Kingdom) E Silva	6	2	[10]
(United States) H Giavara; K Pavlova	6^{3}	6	[10]
2	(United States) R Anderson (United States) D Hewitt	7^{7}	3	[3]

Semifinals
(United States) H Chang (Serbia) K Jokić	4	6	[10]
4	(Canada) K Cross (Lithuania) J Mikulskytė	6	4	[5]
3	(United Kingdom) SB Grey (United Kingdom) E Silva	6	6
(United States) H Giavara; K Pavlova	0	4

Final
(United States) H Chang (Serbia) K Jokić	4	4
3	(United Kingdom) SB Grey (United Kingdom) E Silva	6	6
