= 2020 Calgary National Bank Challenger – Doubles =

Doubles
- 2020 Calgary National Bank Challenger

Final
- Champions: (United States) Nathan Pasha (United States) Max Schnur
- Runners-up: (Australia) Harry Bourchier (Canada) Filip Peliwo
- Score: 7–6^{(7–4)}, 6–3

Events
Singles	Doubles
- Calgary National Bank Challenger

Robert Galloway and Nathan Pasha were the defending champions but only Pasha chose to defend his title, partnering Max Schnur. Pasha successfully defended his title after defeating Harry Bourchier and Filip Peliwo 7–6^{(7–4)}, 6–3 in the final.

== Seeds ==
1. (United States) Evan King / (United States) Hunter Reese (first round)
2. (Poland) Karol Drzewiecki / (Portugal) Gonçalo Oliveira (quarterfinals)
3. (United States) Nathan Pasha / (United States) Max Schnur (champions)
4. (Finland) Harri Heliövaara / (Finland) Patrik Niklas-Salminen (quarterfinals)

== Draw ==
Key

- Q = Qualifier
- WC = Wild card
- LL = Lucky loser
- Alt = Alternate
- ITF = ITF entry
- PR = Protected ranking
- SR = Special ranking
- SE = Special exempt
- JE = Junior exempt
- JR = Junior Accelerator Programme entrant
- CO = College Accelerator Programme entrant
- NG = Next Gen Accelerator Program entrant
- w/o = Walkover
- r = Retired
- d = Defaulted

First round
1	(United States) E King (United States) H Reese	6	2	[4]
(France) M Guinard (France) A Rinderknech	2	6	[10]
(Tunisia) A Dougaz (Tunisia) S Mansouri	0	3
Alt	(United States) Felix Corwin (United Kingdom) R Peniston	6	6
3	(United States) N Pasha (United States) M Schnur	6	6
Alt	(Japan) S Shimabukuro (Japan) Jumpei Yamasaki	3	4
(United States) JC Aragone (United States) T-S Kwiatkowski	5	3
PR	(United States) C Harrison (United States) D Novikov	7	6
(Germany) J Lenz (Australia) A Santillan	3	7^{7}	[8]
(United Kingdom) L Broady (United Kingdom) S Clayton	6	6^{5}	[10]
(United States) J Cerretani (United States) K Lovett	5	3
4	(Finland) H Heliövaara (Finland) P Niklas-Salminen	7	6
(Zimbabwe) B Lock (Zimbabwe) CJ Lock	6	3	[8]
(Australia) H Bourchier (Canada) F Peliwo	4	6	[10]
(France) G Blancaneaux (Australia) Jacob Grills	4	2
2	(Poland) K Drzewiecki (Portugal) G Oliveira	6	6

Quarterfinals
(France) M Guinard (France) A Rinderknech	6	6
Alt	(United States) F Corwin (United Kingdom) R Peniston	4	4
3	(United States) N Pasha (United States) M Schnur	2	6	[12]
PR	(United States) C Harrison (United States) D Novikov	6	4	[10]
(United Kingdom) L Broady (United Kingdom) S Clayton	1	7^{7}	[13]
4	(Finland) H Heliövaara (Finland) P Niklas-Salminen	6	6^{5}	[11]
(Australia) H Bourchier (Canada) F Peliwo	6	7^{7}
2	(Poland) K Drzewiecki (Portugal) G Oliveira	3	6^{3}

Semifinals
(France) M Guinard (France) A Rinderknech	1	7^{7}	[7]
3	(United States) N Pasha (United States) M Schnur	6	6^{4}	[10]
(United Kingdom) L Broady (United Kingdom) S Clayton	4	7^{7}	[5]
(Australia) H Bourchier (Canada) F Peliwo	6	6^{5}	[10]

Final
3	(United States) N Pasha (United States) M Schnur	7^{7}	6
(Australia) H Bourchier (Canada) F Peliwo	6^{4}	3
