= 2020 Calgary National Bank Challenger – Singles =

Singles
- 2020 Calgary National Bank Challenger

Final
- Champion: (France) Arthur Rinderknech
- Runner-up: (United States) Maxime Cressy
- Score: 3–6, 7–6^{(7–5)}, 6–4

Events
Singles	Doubles
- Calgary National Bank Challenger

Ivo Karlović was the defending champion but lost in the third round to Geoffrey Blancaneaux.

Arthur Rinderknech won the title after defeating Maxime Cressy 3–6, 7–6^{(7–5)}, 6–4 in the final.

== Seeds ==
All seeds receive a bye into the second round.

1. (Canada) Vasek Pospisil (second round)
2. (Japan) Go Soeda (second round)
3. (Croatia) Ivo Karlović (third round)
4. (Japan) Tatsuma Ito (second round)
5. (Canada) Brayden Schnur (third round)
6. (United States) Thai-Son Kwiatkowski (second round)
7. (United Kingdom) Liam Broady (semifinals)
8. (France) Arthur Rinderknech (champion)
9. (Germany) Julian Lenz (third round)
10. (United States) Maxime Cressy (final)
11. (Germany) Tobias Kamke (quarterfinals)
12. (Australia) Akira Santillan (second round)
13. (United States) JC Aragone (third round)
14. (France) Geoffrey Blancaneaux (quarterfinals)
15. (Portugal) Gonçalo Oliveira (quarterfinals)
16. (France) Manuel Guinard (second round)

== Draw ==
Key

- Q = Qualifier
- WC = Wild card
- LL = Lucky loser
- Alt = Alternate
- ITF = ITF entry
- PR = Protected ranking
- SR = Special ranking
- SE = Special exempt
- JE = Junior exempt
- JR = Junior Accelerator Programme entrant
- CO = College Accelerator Programme entrant
- NG = Next Gen Accelerator Program entrant
- w/o = Walkover
- r = Retired
- d = Defaulted

=== Finals ===
Quarterfinals
(Poland) Kacper Żuk	6	6
11	(Germany) Tobias Kamke	4	4
14	(France) Geoffrey Blancaneaux	4	2
8	(France) Arthur Rinderknech	6	6
10	(United States) Maxime Cressy	4	7^{13}	6
(Japan) Yusuke Takahashi	6	6^{11}	4
7	(United Kingdom) Liam Broady	7^{7}	2	6
15	(Portugal) Gonçalo Oliveira	6^{4}	6	4

Semifinals
(Poland) Kacper Żuk	3	6^{3}
8	(France) Arthur Rinderknech	6	7^{7}
10	(United States) Maxime Cressy	6	4	7^{7}
7	(United Kingdom) Liam Broady	3	6	6^{5}

Final
8	(France) Arthur Rinderknech	3	7^{7}	6
10	(United States) Maxime Cressy	6	6^{5}	4

=== Top half ===
==== Section 1 ====
First round
(United States) R Sarmiento	3	4
(Poland) K Żuk	6	6
Q	(United States) Felix Corwin	6	6
LL	(United States) D Novikov	4	4
(Canada) F Peliwo	6	7
(Japan) Jumpei Yamasaki	1	5
PR	(Australia) B Mott	3	6	6
WC	(Canada) A Galarneau	6	4	1

Second round
1	(Canada) V Pospisil	4	6	4
(Poland) K Żuk	6	4	6
Q	(United States) F Corwin	2	1
13	(United States) JC Aragone	6	6
11	(Germany) T Kamke	6	6
(Canada) F Peliwo	4	0
PR	(Australia) B Mott	4	4
5	(Canada) B Schnur	6	6

Third round
(Poland) K Żuk	7^{8}	6
13	(United States) JC Aragone	6^{6}	4
11	(Germany) T Kamke	7^{7}	6
5	(Canada) B Schnur	6^{5}	3

Quarterfinals
(Poland) K Żuk	6	6
11	(Germany) T Kamke	4	4

==== Section 2 ====
First round
(United Kingdom) R Peniston	3	4
(United States) E King	6	6
(Zimbabwe) B Lock	6	6^{5}	6
(Japan) S Shimabukuro	4	7^{7}	2
(Japan) Shintaro Imai	6	6
LL	(Finland) H Heliövaara	0	2
(United States) C Altamirano	6	7^{10}
(Italy) Fabrizio Ornago	3	6^{8}

Second round
3	(Croatia) I Karlović	7^{7}	6
(United States) E King	6^{2}	4
(Zimbabwe) B Lock	2	0
14	(France) G Blancaneaux	6	6
9	(Germany) J Lenz	6	3	7^{7}
(Japan) S Imai	3	6	6^{3}
(United States) C Altamirano	6	3	3
8	(France) A Rinderknech	3	6	6

Third round
3	(Croatia) I Karlović	6^{7}	4
14	(France) G Blancaneaux	7^{9}	6
9	(Germany) J Lenz	7^{9}	3	6^{3}
8	(France) A Rinderknech	6^{7}	6	7^{7}

Quarterfinals
14	(France) G Blancaneaux	4	2
8	(France) A Rinderknech	6	6

=== Bottom half ===
==== Section 3 ====
First round
(Italy) L Caruana	2	4
(Tunisia) A Dougaz	6	6
(Australia) Jacob Grills	2	4
(Finland) P Niklas-Salminen	6	6
(Germany) Tobias Simon	7^{7}	6
WC	(Canada) T Baadi	6^{2}	2
(Japan) Y Takahashi	6	6
(France) Quentin Robert	4	4

Second round
6	(United States) T-S Kwiatkowski	6	3	6^{6}
(Tunisia) A Dougaz	4	6	7^{8}
(Finland) P Niklas-Salminen	3	2
10	(United States) M Cressy	6	6
16	(France) M Guinard	7^{7}	6^{4}	6^{4}
(Germany) T Simon	6^{3}	7^{7}	7^{7}
(Japan) Y Takahashi	6	6
4	(Japan) T Ito	3	3

Third round
(Tunisia) A Dougaz	0	1^{r}
10	(United States) M Cressy	6	4
(Germany) T Simon	4	6^{4}
(Japan) Y Takahashi	6	7^{7}

Quarterfinals
10	(United States) M Cressy	4	7^{13}	6
(Japan) Y Takahashi	6	6^{11}	4

==== Section 4 ====
First round
(United States) Gage Brymer	6	7^{7}
WC	(Canada) G Diallo	2	6^{2}
(United States) N Chappell	6	6
WC	(Canada) Joshua Peck	1	4
(Argentina) MF Descotte	6^{5}	7^{7}	6
WC	(Canada) C Harper	7^{7}	6^{3}	4
(Australia) H Bourchier	3	6^{7}
Q	(United States) A Rybakov	6	7^{9}

Second round
7	(United Kingdom) L Broady	6	7
(United States) G Brymer	1	5
(United States) N Chappell	6	6^{5}	6
12	(Australia) A Santillan	4	7^{7}	1
15	(Portugal) G Oliveira	6	6
(Argentina) MF Descotte	4	4
Q	(United States) A Rybakov	7^{7}	6^{5}	7^{7}
2	(Japan) G Soeda	6^{4}	7^{7}	6^{2}

Third round
7	(United Kingdom) L Broady	4	6	6
(United States) N Chappell	6	4	2
15	(Portugal) G Oliveira	6^{6}	6	6
Q	(United States) A Rybakov	7^{8}	3	4

Quarterfinals
7	(United Kingdom) L Broady	7^{7}	2	6
15	(Portugal) G Oliveira	6^{4}	6	4
