= Katarina Jokić =

Serbian tennis player (born 1998)

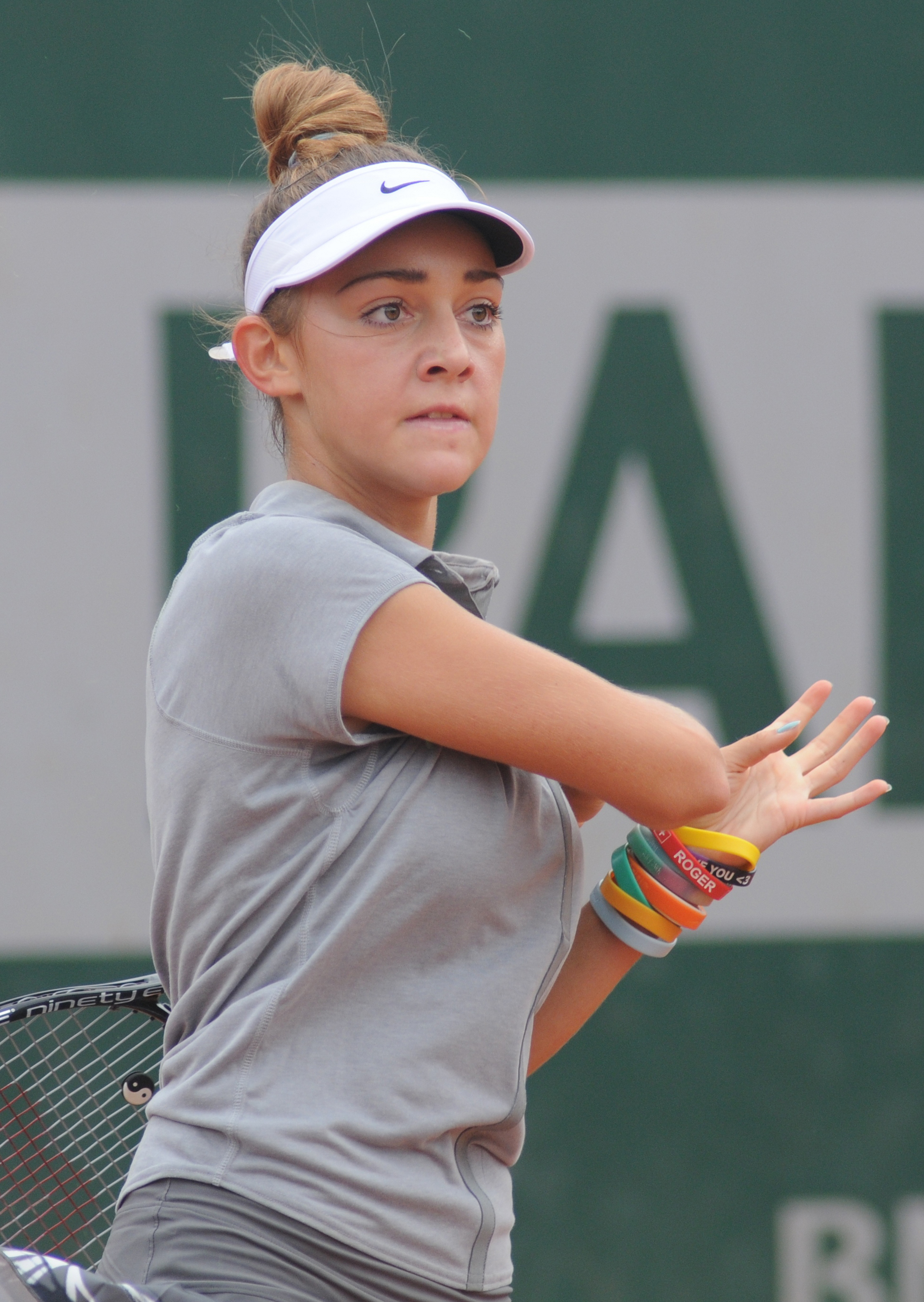
- Katarina Jokić at the 2014 French Open
- Country (sports): Bosnia and Herzegovina (2013); Serbia (2014–present)
- Born: 19 April 1998 (age 28) Zrenjanin, FR Yugoslavia (now Serbia)
- Plays: Right-handed
- College: Georgia Bulldogs
- Prize money: $67,959

Singles
- Career record: 143–84
- Career titles: 3 ITF
- Highest ranking: No. 340 (20 October 2025)
- Current ranking: No. 595 (19 May 2025)

Doubles
- Career record: 57–48
- Career titles: 6 ITF
- Highest ranking: No. 291 (4 December 2023)
- Current ranking: No. 832 (19 May 2025)

Team competitions
- BJK Cup: 0–1
- Last updated on: 22 May 2025.

Katarina Jokić (Serbian Cyrillic: Катарина Јокић; born 19 April 1998) is a Serbian tennis player.

Jokić has a career-high singles ranking of 417 by the WTA, achieved on 17 October 2022. She also has a career-high WTA doubles ranking of 291, achieved on 4 December 2023. In her career, she has won three singles and six doubles tournaments on the ITF Circuit.

Jokić played college tennis for the Georgia Bulldogs from 2017 to 2021. Ranked as ranked as high as No. 1 in singles and No. 3 in doubles, she was named All-American in singles all four years and twice in doubles. She was twice a Honda Award finalist and was named the Intercollegiate Tennis Association (ITA) National Player of the Year as a sophomore in 2018–19.

Playing for Serbia, she has a win–loss record of 0–1 in Billie Jean King Cup competition.

== Performance timeline ==
Key
W	F	SF	QF	#R	RR	Q#	P#	DNQ	A	Z#	PO	G	S	B	NMS	NTI	P	NH

(W) winner; (F) finalist; (SF) semifinalist; (QF) quarterfinalist; (#R) rounds 4, 3, 2, 1; (RR) round-robin stage; (Q#) qualification round; (P#) preliminary round; (DNQ) did not qualify; (A) absent; (Z#) Davis/Fed Cup Zonal Group (with number indication) or (PO) play-off; (G) gold, (S) silver or (B) bronze Olympic/Paralympic medal; (NMS) not a Masters tournament; (NTI) not a Tier I tournament; (P) postponed; (NH) not held; (SR) strike rate (events won / competed); (W–L) win–loss record.
To avoid confusion and double counting, these charts are updated at the conclusion of a tournament or when the player's participation has ended.

Only main-draw results in WTA Tour, Grand Slam tournaments, Billie Jean King Cup and Olympic Games are included in win–loss records.

== ITF Circuit finals ==
=== Singles: 4 (3 titles, 1 runner–up) ===
Legend
W25/35 tournaments
W10/15 tournaments

Result	W–L	Date	Tournament	Tier	Surface	Opponent	Score
Loss	0–1	Sep 2013	ITF Budva, Montenegro	10,000	Clay	(Croatia) Iva Mekovec	0–6, 6–1, 3–6
Win	1–1	Apr 2014	ITF Sibenik, Croatia	10,000	Clay	(Croatia) Iva Mekovec	6–4, 6–1
Win	2–1	Jul 2016	ITF Prokuplje, Serbia	10,000	Clay	(France) Sara Cakarevic	6–4, 7–5
Win	3–1	May 2025	ITF Santo Domingo, Dominican Republic	W35	Clay	(Greece) Despina Papamichail	7–6^{(8)}, 6^{(0)}-7, 6-2

=== Doubles: 10 (6 titles, 4 runner–ups) ===
Legend
W60/75 tournaments
W25/35 tournaments
W10/15 tournaments

Result	W–L	Date	Tournament	Tier	Surface	Partner(s)	Opponents	Score
Loss	0–1	Aug 2013	ITF Brcko, BiH	10,000	Clay	(Serbia) Nikolina Jović	(North Macedonia) Lina Gjorcheska (Bulgaria) Dalia Zafirova	5–7, 1–6
Win	1–1	Nov 2022	ITF Helsinki, Finland	W25	Hard (i)	(United States) Taylor Ng	(Germany) Anna Klasen (Belgium) Eliessa Vanlangendonck	3–6, 6–2, [10–7]
Win	2–1	Dec 2022	ITF Sëlva, Italy	W25	Hard (i)	(United States) Taylor Ng	(Switzerland) Xenia Knoll (Italy) Angelica Moratelli	6–3, 6–2
Loss	2–2	May 2023	ITF Orlando, United States	W25	Clay	(United States) Dalayna Hewitt	(United States) Makenna Jones (United States) Maria Mateas	4–6, 2–6
Win	3–2	Sep 2023	ITF Kuršumlijska Banja, Serbia	W15	Clay	(Greece) Eleni Christofi	(Germany) Mara Guth; Elena Pridankina	6–2, 6–3
Loss	3–3	Nov 2023	Calgary Challenger, Canada	W60	Hard (i)	(United States) Hanna Chang	(United Kingdom) Sarah Beth Grey (United Kingdom) Eden Silva	4–6, 4–6
Win	4–3	Nov 2023	ITF Santo Domingo, Dominican Republic	W25	Hard	(United States) Taylor Ng	(Sweden) Jacqueline Cabaj Awad (Mexico) María Fernanda Navarro Oliva	w/o
Loss	4–4	Apr 2024	Florianópolis Challenger, Brazil	W75	Clay	(Brazil) Rebeca Pereira	Maria Kozyreva; Maria Kononova	4–6, 3–6
Win	5–4	Nov 2024	ITF Alcalá de Henares, Spain	W15	Hard	(Poland) Anna Hertel	(Spain) Celia Cerviño Ruiz (Spain) Claudia Ferrer Pérez	7–6^{(3)}, 6–4
Win	6–4	Jun 2025	ITF Ystad, Sweden	W35	Clay	(Brazil) Rebeca Pereira	(Sweden) June Björk (Denmark) Emma Kamper	1–6, 6–2, [10–7]
