= Calgary Challenger =

Tennis tournament in Alberta, Canada

Calgary National Bank Challenger

Defunct tennis tournament
- Event name: Calgary National Bank Challenger
- Founded: 2018; 8 years ago
- Abolished: 2024; 2 years ago
- Location: Calgary, Alberta, Canada
- Venue: Osten & Victor Alberta Tennis Centre
- Surface: Hard (indoor)
- Website: Official website
ATP Tour
- Category: ATP Challenger Tour
- Draw: 32S (32Q) / 16D (0Q)
- Prize money: US$75,000
WTA Tour
- Category: ITF Women's World Tennis Tour
- Draw: 32S/32Q/16D
- Prize money: US$60,000

The Calgary National Bank Challenger was a professional tennis tournament played on indoor hardcourts. It was part of the ATP Challenger Tour and the ITF Women's World Tennis Tour. The first edition was held in Calgary, Alberta, Canada, in October 2018. The Calgary Challenger ended, after fulfilling its five-year contract with Tennis Canada, with the final edition held in October 2024.

== Past finals ==
=== Men's singles ===
Year	Champions	Runners-up	Score
2024	(United States) Murphy Cassone	(United States) Govind Nanda	4–6, 6–3, 6–4
2023	(Canada) Liam Draxl	(Germany) Dominik Koepfer	6–4, 6–3
2022	(Germany) Dominik Koepfer	(Australia) Aleksandar Vukic	6–2, 6–4
2021	Not held		
2020	(France) Arthur Rinderknech	(United States) Maxime Cressy	3–6, 7–6^{(7–5)}, 6–4
2019	Not held		
2018	(Croatia) Ivo Karlović	(Australia) Jordan Thompson	7–6^{(7–3)}, 6–3

=== Women's singles ===
Year	Champions	Runners-up	Score
2024	(Canada) Rebecca Marino	(United States) Anna Rogers	7–5, 6–4
2023	(Germany) Sabine Lisicki	(Canada) Stacey Fung	7–6^{(7–2)}, 6–7^{(5–7)}, 6–3
2022	(United States) Robin Montgomery	(Poland) Urszula Radwańska	7–6^{(8–6)}, 7–5

=== Men's doubles ===
Year	Champions	Runners-up	Score
2024	(United States) Ryan Seggerman (United States) Patrik Trhac	(United States) Robert Cash (United States) JJ Tracy	6–3, 7–6^{(7–3)}
2023	(Canada) Juan Carlos Aguilar (Canada) Justin Boulais	(United Kingdom) Charles Broom (United Kingdom) Ben Jones	6–3, 6–2
2022	(Austria) Maximilian Neuchrist (Greece) Michail Pervolarakis	(Italy) Julian Ocleppo (Germany) Kai Wehnelt	6–4, 6–4
2021	Not held		
2020	(United States) Nathan Pasha (United States) Max Schnur	(Australia) Harry Bourchier (Canada) Filip Peliwo	7–6^{(7–4)}, 6–3
2019	Not held		
2018	(United States) Robert Galloway (United States) Nathan Pasha	(Australia) Matt Reid (Australia) John-Patrick Smith	6–4, 4–6, [10–6]

=== Women's doubles ===
Year	Champions	Runners-up	Score
2024	(Canada) Kayla Cross (United States) Maribella Zamarripa	(United States) Robin Anderson (United States) Katarina Jokić	6–7^{(3–7)}, 7–5, [12–10]
2023	(United Kingdom) Sarah Beth Grey (United Kingdom) Eden Silva	(United States) Hanna Chang (Serbia) Dalayna Hewitt	6–4, 6–4
2022	(United States) Catherine Harrison (United States) Sabrina Santamaria	(Canada) Kayla Cross (Canada) Marina Stakusic	7–6^{(7–2)}, 6–4
