= Hanna Chang (tennis) =

American female tennis player (born 1998)

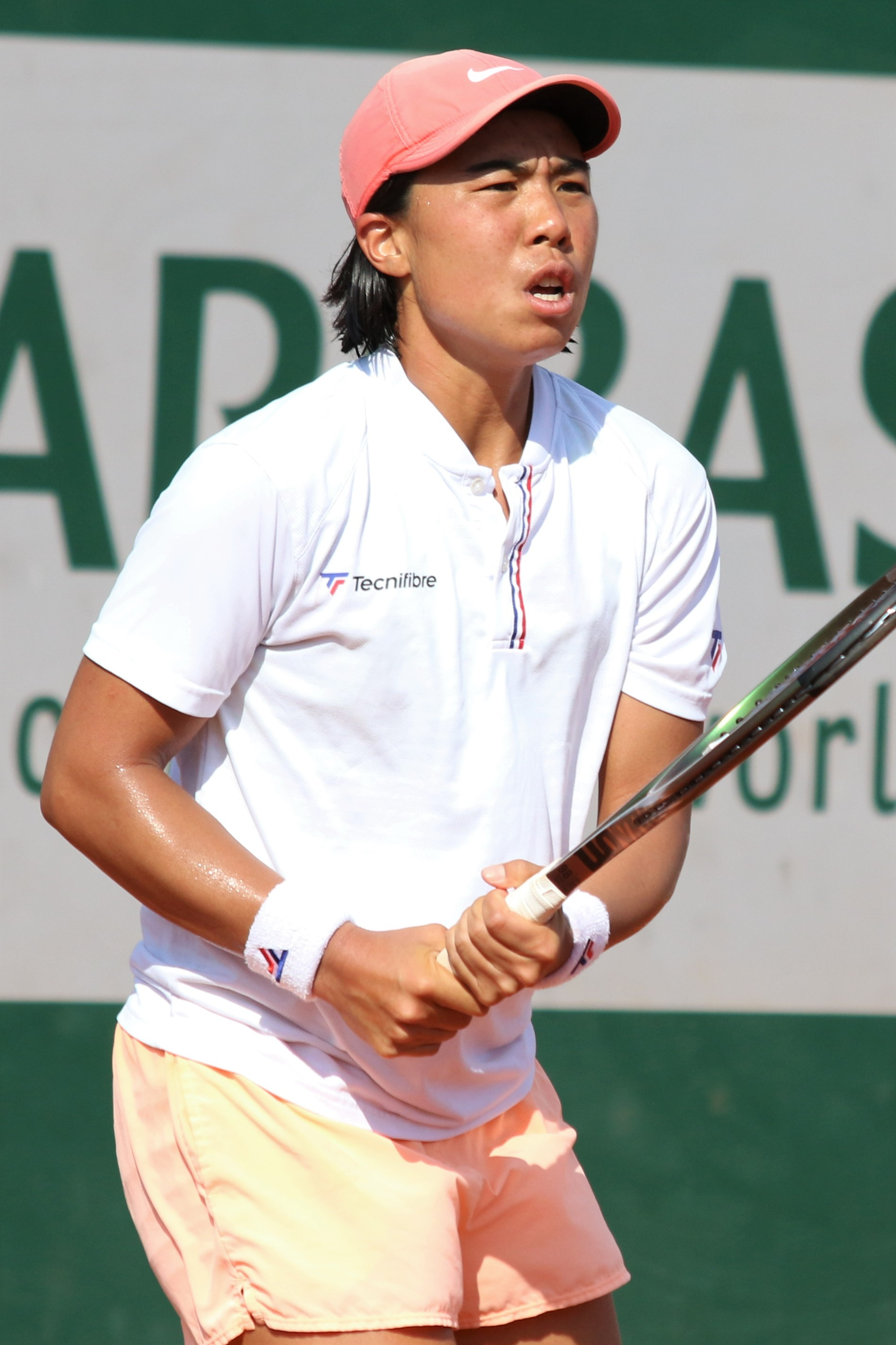
- Chang at the 2022 French Open
- Country (sports): United States
- Born: February 25, 1998 (age 28)
- Plays: Right (two-handed backhand)
- Prize money: $507,481

Singles
- Career record: 369–261
- Career titles: 13 ITF
- Highest ranking: No. 169 (November 25, 2024)
- Current ranking: No. 297 (September 28, 2025)

Grand Slam singles results
- Australian Open: Q1 (2022, 2025)
- French Open: Q2 (2025)
- Wimbledon: Q2 (2022)
- US Open: Q2 (2021, 2024)

Doubles
- Career record: 68–78
- Career titles: 1 WTA 125, 3 ITF
- Highest ranking: No. 265 (June 6, 2022)
- Current ranking: No. 812 (September 28, 2026)
- Last updated on: September 28, 2026.

Hanna Chang (born February 25, 1998) is an American professional tennis player.

Chang has a career-high singles ranking of 169 by the WTA, achieved on 25 November 2024. She also has a career-high WTA doubles ranking of 265, reached on 6 June 2022.

Chang won her first W100 title at the 2021 Landisville Tennis Challenge, partnering with Alexa Glatch in the doubles draw.

She reached her first WTA 125 final at the 2024 LTP Charleston Pro losing to top seed Renata Zarazúa, in straight sets.

== WTA 125 finals ==
=== Singles: 1 (runner-up) ===
Result	W–L	Date	Tournament	Surface	Opponent	Score
Loss	0–1	Nov 2024	LTP Charleston Pro, United States	Clay	(Mexico) Renata Zarazúa	1–6, 6–7^{(4–7)}

=== Doubles: 1 (title) ===
Result	W–L	Date	Tournament	Surface	Partner	Opponents	Score
Win	1–0	Mar 2025	Puerto Vallarta Open, Mexico	Hard	(United States) Christina McHale	(Australia) Maya Joint (Japan) Ena Shibahara	2–6, 6–2, [10–7]

== ITF Circuit finals ==
=== Singles: 19 (13 titles, 6 runner-ups) ===
Legend W40/50 tournaments W25/35 tournaments W10/15 tournaments	Finals by surface Hard (13–5) Clay (0–1)

Result	W–L	Date	Tournament	Tier	Surface	Opponent	Score
Win	1–0	Jun 2016	ITF Sangju, South Korea	W10	Hard	(South Korea) Choi Ji-hee	6–2, 6–3
Loss	1–1	Jul 2016	ITF Gimcheon, South Korea	W10	Hard	(South Korea) Jeong Su-nam	6–4, 2–6, 3–6
Win	2–1	Sep 2017	ITF Yeongwol, South Korea	W15	Hard	(South Korea) Kim Da-bin	7–5, 7–6^{(6)}
Win	3–1	Jun 2018	ITF Gyeongsan, South Korea	W15	Hard	(Japan) Eri Shimizu	6–4, 6–2
Loss	3–2	Aug 2018	ITF Gimcheon, South Korea	W15	Hard	(South Korea) Kim Da-hye	1–6, 4–6
Win	4–2	Mar 2019	ITF Arcadia, United States	W15	Hard	(United States) Elizabeth Mandlik	7–5, 6–1
Loss	4–3	Jun 2022	ITF Sumter, United States	W25	Hard	(United States) Sophie Chang	2–6, 6–4, 6–7^{(5)}
Loss	4–4	Apr 2023	Florida's Sports Coast Open, US	W25	Clay	(United States) Makenna Jones	7–5, 4–6, 1–6
Win	5–4	May 2023	ITF Goyang, South Korea	W25	Hard	(Thailand) Mananchaya Sawangkaew	6–2, 6–4
Win	6–4	Jul 2023	ITF Lakewood, US	W15	Hard	(United States) Mary Stoiana	1–1 ret.
Loss	6–5	Nov 2023	ITF Austin, US	W25	Hard	(Andorra) Victoria Jiménez Kasintseva	0–6, 2–6
Win	7–5	Dec 2023	ITF Veracruz, Mexico	W40	Hard	(Mexico) Victoria Rodríguez	7–5, 6–1
Win	8–5	May 2024	ITF Goyang, South Korea	W50	Hard	(Japan) Aoi Ito	7–6^{(2)}, 6–4
Win	9–5	Jun 2024	ITF Changwon, South Korea	W35	Hard	(Australia) Petra Hule	6–4, 6–4
Loss	9–6	Apr 2026	ITF Miyazaki, Japan	W35	Hard	(Japan) Hayu Kinoshita	4–6, 6–7^{(11)}
Win	10–6	Apr 2026	ITF Miyazaki, Japan	W35	Hard	(South Korea) Jeong Bo-young	6–3, 4–2 ret.
Win	11–6	May 2026	ITF Changwon, South Korea	W35	Hard	(Japan) Ena Koike	6–4, 7–6^{(2)}
Win	12–6	Jul 2026	Dallas Summer Series, US	W35	Hard (i)	Alina Shcherbinina	2–6, 6–4, 6–4
Win	13–6	Oct 2026	ITF Bakersfield, US	W35	Hard	(United States) Jenna DeFalco	6–3, 7–5

=== Doubles: 9 (3 titles, 6 runner-ups) ===
Legend W100 tournaments W60 tournaments W50 tournaments W25/35 tournaments W15 tournaments	Finals by surface Hard (2–4) Clay (1–2)

Result	W–L	Date	Tournament	Tier	Surface	Partner	Opponents	Score
Loss	0–1	Sep 2018	ITF Yeongwol, South Korea	W15	Hard	(China) Zhang Ying	(Japan) Erina Hayashi (Japan) Chisa Hosonuma	1–6, 1–6
Loss	0–2	Apr 2019	ITF Jackson, US	W25	Clay	(United States) Caitlin Whoriskey	(Poland) Katarzyna Kawa (Poland) Katarzyna Piter	5–7, 1–6
Win	1–2	Aug 2021	Landisville Tennis Challenge, US	W100	Hard	(United States) Alexa Glatch	(United Kingdom) Samantha Murray Sharan (Russia) Valeria Savinykh	7–6^{(3)}, 3–6, [11–9]
Win	2–2	Nov 2021	ITF Naples, United States	W25	Clay	(United States) Elizabeth Mandlik	(Chinese Taipei) Hsu Chieh-yu (Indonesia) Jessy Rompies	6–4, 1–6, [10–7]
Loss	2–3	May 2022	ITF Orlando Pro, US	W60	Hard	(United States) Elizabeth Mandlik	(United States) Sophie Chang (United States) Angela Kulikov	3–6, 6–2, [6–10]
Loss	2–4	Nov 2023	Calgary Challenger, Canada	W60	Hard (i)	(Serbia) Katarina Jokić	(United Kingdom) Eden Silva (United Kingdom) Sarah Beth Grey	4–6, 4–6
Win	3–4	Nov 2024	ITF Veracruz, Mexico	W50	Hard	(United States) Dalayna Hewitt	(Mexico) Jéssica Hinojosa Gómez (Japan) Hiroko Kuwata	6–4, 7–5
Loss	3–5	Jan 2026	ITF Weston, United States	W35	Clay	(United States) Victoria Hu	(China) Dang Yiming (China) You Xiaodi	3–6, 6–2, [8–10]
Loss	3–6	May 2026	ITF Changwon, South Korea	W35	Hard	(South Korea) Jang Ga-eul	(South Korea) Back Da-yeon (China) Guo Meiqi	5–7, 5–7
