= Justin Boulais =

Tennis player (born 2001)

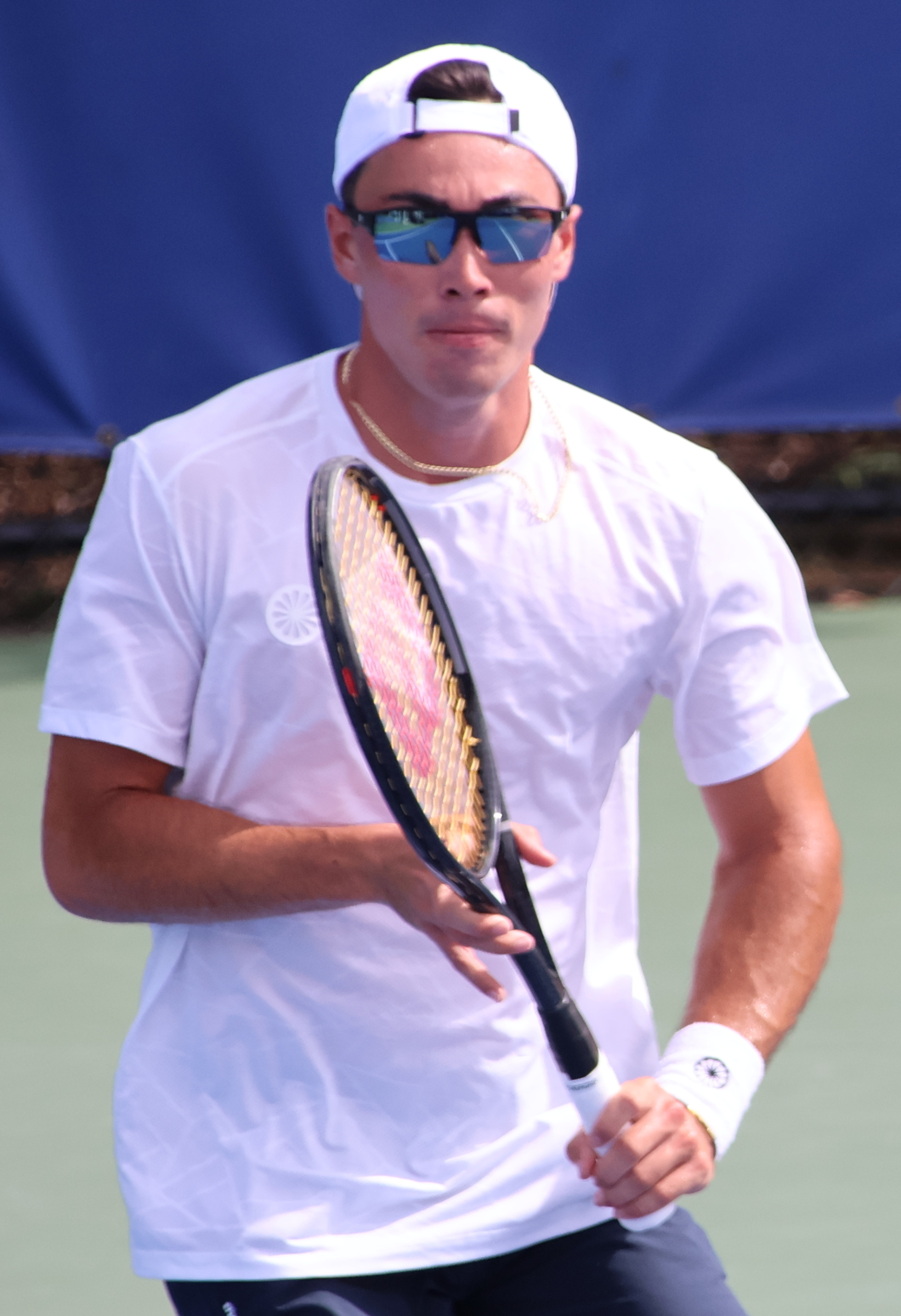
- Boulais in 2026
- Country (sports): Canada
- Born: October 20, 2001 (age 24) Hilton Head Island, South Carolina, United States
- Height: 1.83 m (6 ft 0 in)
- Plays: Left-handed (one-handed backhand)
- College: Ohio State
- Coach: Yves Boulais, Patricia Hy
- Prize money: US $167,843

Singles
- Career record: 0–0
- Career titles: 0; 0 Challenger, 2 Futures
- Highest ranking: No. 363 (8 June 2026)
- Current ranking: No. 415 (19 October 2026)

Doubles
- Career record: 0–1
- Career titles: 0; 1 Challenger, 3 Futures
- Highest ranking: No. 211 (19 October 2026)
- Current ranking: No. 211 (19 October 2026)
- Last updated on: 19 October 2026.

Justin Boulais (born October 20, 2001) is an American-born Canadian tennis player. Boulais has a career high ATP singles ranking of No. 363 achieved on 8 June 2026 and a career high ATP doubles ranking of No. 211 achieved on 19 October 2026.

Boulais has won 1 ATP Challenger doubles title at the 2023 Calgary National Bank Challenger with Juan Carlos Aguilar.

Boulais played college tennis at Ohio State.

== ATP Challenger and ITF Futures finals ==
=== Singles: 5 (3–2) ===
Legend ATP Challenger (0–0) ITF Futures (3–2)	Finals by surface Hard (3–2) Clay (0–0) Grass (0–0) Carpet (0–0)

Result	W–L	Date	Tournament	Tier	Surface	Opponent	Score
Win	1–1	Sep 2022	M15 Champaign, USA	World Tennis Tour	Hard	(United States) Sekou Bangoura	6–1, 6–1
Loss	1–1	Oct 2022	M25 Saint-Augustin, Canada	World Tennis Tour	Hard	(Tunisia) Aziz Dougaz	5–7, 4–6
Win	2–1	Nov 2023	M25 Edmonton, Canada	World Tennis Tour	Hard	(United Kingdom) Giles Hussey	3–6, 7–6^{(7–1)}, 6–0
Loss	2–2	Jun 2025	M25 Laval, Canada	World Tennis Tour	Hard	(Jamaica) Blaise Bicknell	6–3, 6–7^{(6–8)}, 6–7^{(5–7)}
Win	3–2	Mar 2026	M25 Faro, Portugal	World Tennis Tour	Hard	(Portugal) João Domingues	7–5, 6–4

=== Doubles: 13 (7–6) ===
Legend ATP Challenger (1–3) ITF Futures (6–3)	Finals by surface Hard (7–6) Clay (0–0) Grass (0–0) Carpet (0–0)

Result	W–L	Date	Tournament	Tier	Surface	Partner	Opponents	Score
Loss	0–1	Jul 2022	M25 Champaign, USA	World Tennis Tour	Hard	(Japan) James Kent Trotter	(United States) Stefan Dostanic (United Kingdom) Johannus Monday	6–7^{(4–7)}, 3–6
Win	1–1	Aug 2022	M25 Columbus, USA	World Tennis Tour	Hard	(Japan) James Kent Trotter	(India) Purav Raja (India) Divij Sharan	6–1, 6–2
Loss	1–2	Nov 2023	M25 Edmonton, Canada	World Tennis Tour	Hard	(Republic of Ireland) Osgar O'Hoisin	(South Africa) Vasilios Caripi (United Kingdom) Giles Hussey	walkover
Win	2–2	Nov 2023	Calgary, Canada	Challenger	Hard	(Canada) Juan Carlos Aguilar	(United Kingdom) Charles Broom (United Kingdom) Ben Jones	6–3, 6–2
Loss	2–3	Jul 2024	Granby, Canada	Challenger	Hard	(Canada) Joshua Lapadat	(Colombia) Andrés Andrade (United States) Mac Kiger	6–3, 3-6, [2-10]
Win	3–3	Feb 2025	M25 Vila Real de Santo António, Portugal	World Tennis Tour	Hard	(United States) William Woodall	(Finland) Patrick Kaukovalta (United States) Quinn Vandecasteele	7–5, 5–7, [10–7]
Win	4–3	Apr 2025	M25 Nottingham, United Kingdom	World Tennis Tour	Hard	(United States) Andres Martin	(United Kingdom) Charles Broom (United Kingdom) Ben Jones	7–6^{(7–4)}, 6–2
Loss	4–4	Oct 2025	Charlottesville, United States	Challenger	Hard (i)	(United States) Mac Kiger	(Germany) Tim Rühl (Germany) Patrick Zahraj	6–3, 5–7, [10–12]
Win	5–4	Feb 2026	M25 Vale do Lobo, Portugal	World Tennis Tour	Hard	(Portugal) Tiago Pereira	(Portugal) João Domingues (Portugal) Diogo Marques	6–2, 6–3
Win	6–4	Mar 2026	M25 Faro, Portugal	World Tennis Tour	Hard	(Portugal) Francisco Rocha	(Portugal) Hugo Maia (Portugal) Guilherme Valdoleiros	5–7, 6–2, [10–3]
Win	7–4	May 2026	M25 Loulé, Portugal	World Tennis Tour	Hard	(Portugal) Tiago Pereira	(Australia) Thomas Fancutt (New Zealand) Ajeet Rai	7–6^{(7–5)}, 6–7^{(3–7)}, [10–4]
Loss	7–5	Jun 2026	M25 Tulsa, United States	World Tennis Tour	Hard	(United States) Gavin Young	(United States) Axel Nefve (United States) Jack Vance	4–6, 4–6
Loss	7–6	Aug 2026	Quebec City, Canada	Challenger	Hard	(Canada) Duncan Chan	(Bulgaria) Alexander Donski (New Zealand) Ajeet Rai	3–6, 6–4, [3–10]
