= Stacey Fung =

Canadian tennis player (born 1997)

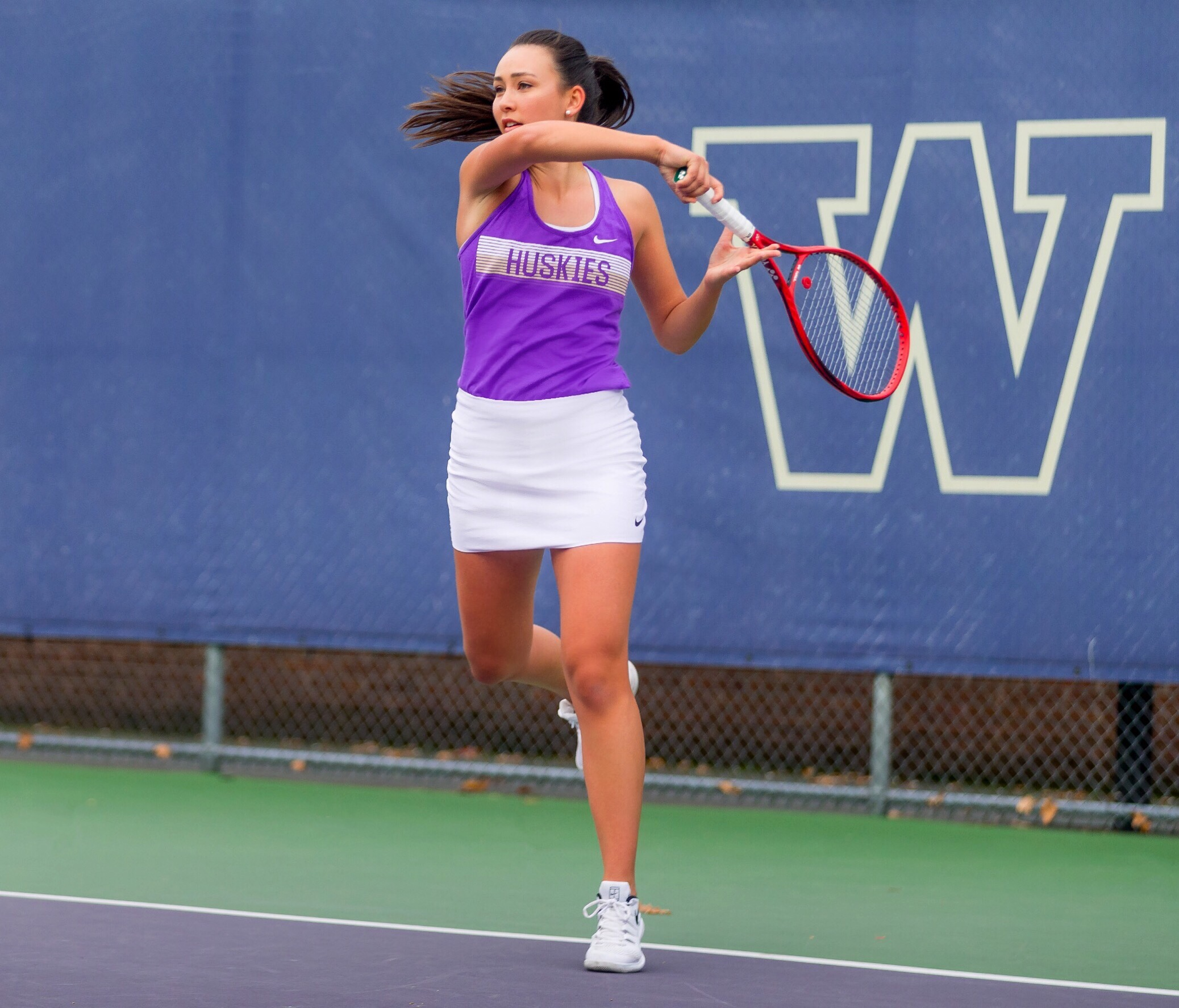
- Fung in 2018
- Country (sports): Canada
- Born: 6 February 1997 (age 29) Hamilton Bermuda
- Height: 1.70 m (5 ft 7 in)
- Plays: Right (two-handed backhand)
- College: Washington
- Prize money: $172,408

Singles
- Career record: 176–105
- Career titles: 9 ITF
- Highest ranking: No. 222 (26 February 2024)

Grand Slam singles results
- Australian Open: Q1 (2024)

Doubles
- Career record: 49–46
- Career titles: 3 ITF
- Highest ranking: No. 454 (17 July 2023)
- Last updated on: 7 June 2026.

Stacey Fung (born 6 February 1997) is a Canadian inactive tennis player. She has a career-high singles ranking by the WTA of 222, achieved on 26 February 2024, and a best doubles ranking of No. 454, set on 17 July 2023.

Fung played collegiate tennis for the Washington Huskies at the University of Washington. During her college career she was crowned an All-American, and achieved a career-high individual ranking of No. 6 in the country.

== Career ==
=== Professional ===
In 2021, Fung won her first titles in singles and doubles in Cancún, Mexico.

In 2022, she won multiple trophies in singles in Cancún. In October, she won a $25k tournament in Fredericton, Canada.

In 2023, she won a $25k event held in Santo Domingo, Dominican Republic. In May, she won the biggest tournament of her career, claiming the $40k title in Tbilisi, Georgia. It was Fung's second title of 2023 and seventh overall.

She made her WTA 1000 debut at the 2023 Guadalajara Open as a direct entry but lost in the first round to Marta Kostyuk in three sets.

== ITF Circuit finals ==
=== Singles: 14 (9 titles, 5 runner-ups) ===
Legend W60 tournaments (0–1) W40/50 tournaments (1–1) W25/35 tournaments (4–1) W15 tournaments (4–2)	Finals by surface Hard (9–5)

Result	W–L	Date	Tournament	Tier	Surface	Opponent	Score
Loss	0–1	Sep 2019	ITF Cancún, Mexico	W15	Hard	(United Kingdom) Emilie Lindh	2–6, 1–6
Loss	0–2	Oct 2019	ITF Metepec, Mexico	W15	Hard	(France) Caroline Romeo	4–6, 6–1, 3–6
Win	1–2	Dec 2021	ITF Cancún, Mexico	W15	Hard	(Colombia) Yuliana Monroy	6–2, 6–3
Win	2–2	Jan 2022	ITF Cancún, Mexico	W15	Hard	(France) Julie Belgraver	7–6^{(1)}, 7–5
Win	3–2	May 2022	ITF Cancún, Mexico	W15	Hard	(Japan) Saki Imamura	6–4, 7–5
Win	4–2	Jun 2022	ITF Cancún, Mexico	W15	Hard	(Japan) Saki Imamura	6–3, 6–3
Win	5–2	Oct 2022	ITF Fredericton, Canada	W25	Hard (i)	(Netherlands) Arianne Hartono	7–5, 6–3
Win	6–2	Feb 2023	ITF Santo Domingo, Dominican Republic	W25	Hard	(Hong Kong) Eudice Chong	2–6, 7–6^{(5)}, 6–1
Win	7–2	May 2023	ITF Tbilisi, Georgia	W40	Hard	(Russia) Vitalia Diatchenko	6–4, ret.
Win	8–2	Jun 2023	ITF Wichita, United States	W25	Hard	(United States) Fiona Crawley	6–3, 6–2
Loss	8–3	Nov 2023	Calgary Challenger, Canada	W60	Hard	(Germany) Sabine Lisicki	6–7^{(2)}, 7–6^{(5)}, 3–6
Loss	8–4	Apr 2024	ITF Osaka, Japan	W35	Hard	(Japan) Sayaka Ishii	1–6, 6–3, 3–6
Win	9–4	Sep 2024	ITF Santarém, Portugal	W35	Hard	(Belgium) Clara Vlasselaer	2–6, 6–3, 6–3
Loss	9–5	Nov 2024	ITF Sëlva Gardena, Italy	W50	Hard (i)	(United States) Tyra Caterina Grant	6–3, 1–6, 5–7

=== Doubles: 7 (3 titles, 4 runner-ups) ===
Legend W60 tournaments (0–1) W25 tournaments (1–0) W15 tournaments (2–3)	Finals by surface Hard (3–4)

Result	W–L	Date	Tournament	Tier	Surface	Partner	Opponents	Score
Loss	0–1	Sep 2019	ITF Cancún, Mexico	W15	Hard	(United States) Alyssa Tobita	(Japan) Haine Ogata (Japan) Aiko Yoshitomi	6–2, 6–7^{(5)}, [7–10]
Loss	0–2	Feb 2020	ITF Cancún, Mexico	W15	Hard	(United States) Hind Abdelouahid	(Italy) Verena Meliss (Belgium) Eliessa Vanlangendonck	2–6, 2–6
Win	1–2	Dec 2021	ITF Cancún, Mexico	W15	Hard	(United States) Pamela Montez	(Mexico) Jessica Hinojosa Gómez (Mexico) Victoria Rodríguez	6–4, 6–2
Win	2–2	Dec 2021	ITF Cancún, Mexico	W15	Hard	(Canada) Ariana Arseneault	(Bulgaria) Eleonore Tchakarova (Bulgaria) Verginie Tchakarova	1–6, 7–6^{(2)}, [10–7]
Loss	2–3	May 2022	ITF Cancún, Mexico	W15	Hard	(United States) Dasha Ivanova	(United States) Sophia Graver (United States) Malkia Ngounoue	2–6, 4–6
Win	3–3	May 2023	ITF Kachreti, Georgia	W25	Hard	Maria Kozyreva	Aglaya Fedorova; Darya Shauha	7–5, 7–5
Loss	3–4	Jul 2023	ITF Saskatoon, Canada	W60	Hard	(India) Karman Thandi	(United States) Abigail Rencheli (United States) Alana Smith	6–4, 4–6, [7–10]
