= WTA Fan Favorite Awards =

Women's tennis association award

The WTA Fan Favorite Awards are a series of annual Women's Tennis Association (WTA) awards given since the 2009 WTA Tour to those who receive the most votes from the fans of the WTA Tour.

== Fan Favorite Singles Player of the Year ==
Year	Player	Nationality
2009	Elena Dementieva	Russia
2010	Maria Sharapova	Russia
2011	Agnieszka Radwańska	Poland
2012	Agnieszka Radwańska (2)	Poland
2013	Agnieszka Radwańska (3)	Poland
2014	Agnieszka Radwańska (4)	Poland
2015	Agnieszka Radwańska (5)	Poland
2016	Agnieszka Radwańska (6)	Poland
2017	Simona Halep	Romania
2018	Simona Halep (2)	Romania
2019	Simona Halep (3)	Romania
2020	Iga Świątek	Poland
2024	Zheng Qinwen	China
2025	Zheng Qinwen (2)	China
2026		

== Fan Favorite Doubles Team of the Year ==
Year	Player	Nationality
2009	Serena Williams; Venus Williams	United States; United States
2010	Serena Williams (2); Venus Williams (2)	United States; United States
2011	Victoria Azarenka; Maria Kirilenko	Belarus; Russia
2012	Serena Williams (3); Venus Williams (3)	United States; United States
2013	Ekaterina Makarova; Elena Vesnina	Russia; Russia
2014	Sara Errani; Roberta Vinci	Italy; Italy
2015*	Serena Williams (4); Caroline Wozniacki	United States; Denmark
2025	Sara Errani (2); Jasmine Paolini	Italy; Italy
2026		

* — In 2015, this award was titled Womance of the Year

== WTA Shot of the Year ==
Year	Player	Nationality	Round	Tournament	City	Location	Video
2013	Agnieszka Radwańska	Poland	QF	Sony Open Tennis	Miami	United States	
2014	Agnieszka Radwańska (2)	Poland	SF	Rogers Cup	Montréal	Canada	
2015	Agnieszka Radwańska (3)	Poland	F	WTA Finals	Singapore	Singapore	
2016	Agnieszka Radwańska (4)	Poland	3R	BNP Paribas Open	Indian Wells	United States	
2017	Agnieszka Radwańska (5)	Poland	2R	Wuhan Open	Wuhan	China	
2018	Simona Halep	Romania	3R	Miami Open	Miami	United States	
2019	Iga Świątek	Poland	SF	Ladies Open Lugano	Lugano	Switzerland	
2020	Magda Linette	Poland	2R	Thailand Open	Hua Hin	Thailand	
2021	Simona Halep (2)	Romania	1R	Transylvania Open	Cluj-Napoca	Romania	
2022	Iga Świątek (2)	Poland	3R	Miami Open	Miami	United States	
2023	Ons Jabeur	Tunisia	F	Charleston Open	Charleston	United States	
2024	Zheng Qinwen	China	F	Wuhan Open	Wuhan	China	
2025	Karolína Muchová	Czech Republic	SF	Dubai Tennis Championships	Dubai	United Arab Emirates	
2026							

== Fan Favorite WTA Match of the Year ==
Year	Match	Tournament	Result	Video
2013	(Russia) Maria Sharapova (W) vs. (Belarus) Victoria Azarenka	(France) French Open SF	6–1, 2–6, 6–4	
2014	(United States) Serena Williams (W) vs. (Denmark) Caroline Wozniacki	(Singapore) WTA Finals SF	2–6, 6–3, 7–6^{(8–6)}	
2015	(Poland) Agnieszka Radwańska (W) vs. (Spain) Garbiñe Muguruza	(Singapore) WTA Finals SF	6–7^{(5–7)}, 6–3, 7–5	
2016	(Czech Republic) Petra Kvitová (W) vs. (Germany) Angelique Kerber	(China) Wuhan Open 3R	6–7^{(10–12)}, 7–5, 6–4	
2017	(France) Caroline Garcia (W) vs. (Ukraine) Elina Svitolina	China Open QF	6–7^{(5–7)}, 7–5, 7–6^{(8–6)}	
2018	(Romania) Simona Halep (W) vs. (United States) Sloane Stephens	(Canada) Canadian Open F	7–6^{(8–6)}, 3–6, 6–4	
2019	(Japan) Naomi Osaka (W) vs. (Canada) Bianca Andreescu	China Open QF	5–7, 6–3, 6–4	
2022	(Czech Republic) Barbora Krejčíková (W) vs. (Poland) Iga Świątek	(Czech Republic) Ostrava Open F	5–7, 7–6^{(7-4)},6–3	
2023	Aryna Sabalenka (W) vs. (Poland) Iga Świątek	(Spain) Madrid Open F	6–3, 3–6, 6–3	
2024	(Poland) Iga Świątek (W) vs. Aryna Sabalenka	(Spain) Madrid Open F	7–5, 4–6, 7–6^{(9–7)}	
2025	(United States) Coco Gauff (W) vs. (China) Zheng Qinwen	(Italy) Italian Open SF	7–6^{(7–3)}, 4–6, 7–6^{(7–4)}	
2026				

== Fan Favorite Grand Slam Match of the Year ==
Year	Players	Nationality	Score	Round	Tournament	City	Location
2013	Maria Sharapova def. Victoria Azarenka	Russia; Belarus	6–1, 2–6, 6–4	SF	French Open	Paris	France
2014	Maria Sharapova def. Simona Halep	Russia; Romania	6–4, 6–7, 6–4	F	French Open	Paris	France
2015	Victoria Azarenka def. Angelique Kerber	Belarus; Germany	7–5, 2–6, 6–4	3R	US Open	New York City	United States
2016	Dominika Cibulková def. Agnieszka Radwańska	Slovakia; Poland	6–3, 5–7, 9–7	4R	Wimbledon	London	United Kingdom
2017	Maria Sharapova def. Simona Halep	Russia; Romania	6–4, 4–6, 6–3	1R	US Open	New York City	United States
2018	Simona Halep def. Angelique Kerber	Romania; Germany	6–3, 4–6, 9–7	SF	Australian Open	Melbourne	Australia
2019	Naomi Osaka def. Petra Kvitová	Japan; Czech Republic	7–6^{(7–2)}, 5–7, 6–4	F	Australian Open	Melbourne	Australia
2020	Victoria Azarenka def. Serena Williams	Belarus; United States	1–6, 6–3, 6–3	SF	US Open	New York City	United States

== Fan Favorite Tournament ==
Year	Tournament	City	Location
2014	WTA Finals	Singapore	Singapore

== Fan Favorite Social Media ==
Year	Facebook	Nationality	Twitter	Nationality
2012	Agnieszka Radwańska	Poland	Caroline Wozniacki	Denmark
2013	Maria Sharapova	Russia	Maria Sharapova	Russia
2014	Maria Sharapova (2)	Russia	Caroline Wozniacki (2)	Denmark
2015	Maria Sharapova (3)	Russia	Maria Sharapova (2)	Russia
