= Iga Świątek =

Polish tennis player (born 2001)

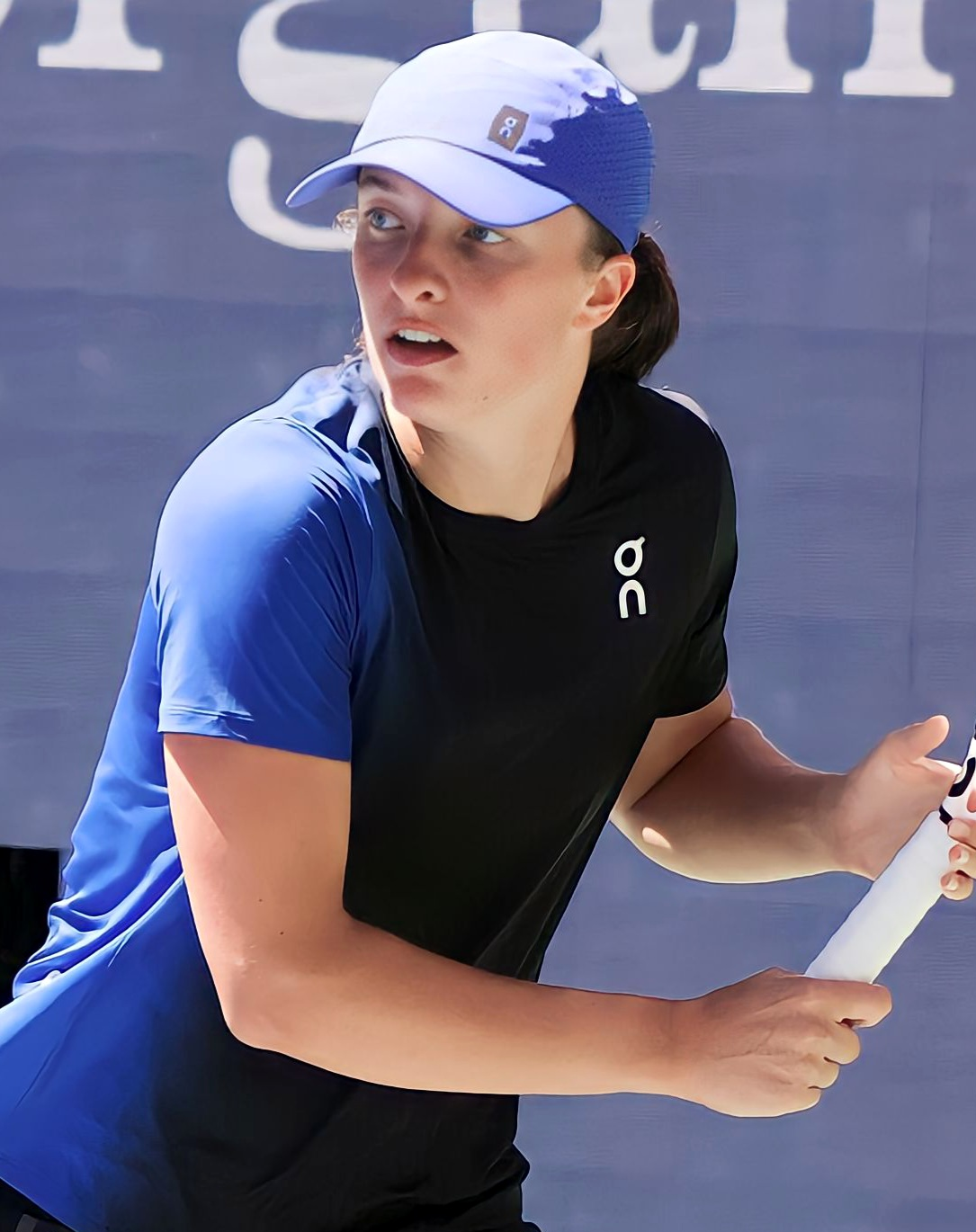
- Świątek at the US Open 2023
- Country (sports): Poland
- Residence: Raszyn, Poland
- Born: 31 May 2001 (age 25) Warsaw, Poland
- Height: 1.76 m (5 ft 9 in)
- Turned pro: 2016
- Plays: Right-handed (two-handed backhand)
- Coach: Francisco Roig
- Prize money: US$ 48,139,729: 3rd all-time in earnings
- Official website: igaswiatek.com

Singles
- Career record: 446–108
- Career titles: 26
- Highest ranking: No. 1 (4 April 2022)
- Current ranking: No. 9 (9 November 2026)

Grand Slam singles results
- Australian Open: SF (2022, 2025)
- French Open: W (2020, 2022, 2023, 2024)
- Wimbledon: W (2025)
- US Open: W (2022)

Other tournaments
- Tour Finals: W (2023)
- Olympic Games: Bronze (2024)

Doubles
- Career record: 27–14
- Career titles: 0
- Highest ranking: No. 29 (14 February 2022)
- Current ranking

Grand Slam doubles results
- French Open: F (2021)
- US Open: 2R (2019)

Mixed doubles
- Career record: 9–5
- Career titles: 0

Grand Slam mixed doubles results
- Australian Open: QF (2020)
- US Open: F (2025)

Other mixed doubles tournaments
- Olympic Games: QF (2020)

Team competitions
- BJK Cup: SF (2024)

Signature
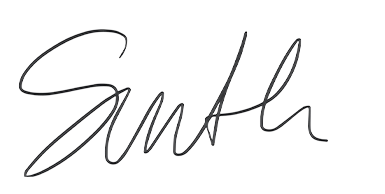
Medal record
Women's tennis
Representing Poland
Olympic Games
Bronze medal – third place	2024 Paris	Singles
Girls' tennis
Representing a Mixed-NOCs team
Youth Olympic Games
Gold medal – first place	2018 Buenos Aires	Girls' doubles
- Last updated on: 9 November 2026.

Iga Natalia Świątek (Note: Polish pronunciation: [ˈiɡa naˈtalja ˈɕfjɔntɛk].) (born 31 May 2001) is a Polish professional tennis player. She has been ranked world No. 1 in women's singles by the Women's Tennis Association (WTA) for 125 weeks (seventh-most of all-time), and finished as the year-end No. 1 in 2022 and 2023. Świątek has won a total of 26 career titles, 20 WTA Tour–level singles titles and six major titles: four at the French Open, one at Wimbledon, and one at the US Open. She has also won the 2023 WTA Finals and twelve WTA 1000 events. Świątek is the first Pole to win a major singles title.

As a junior, Świątek was the 2018 French Open girls' doubles champion alongside Caty McNally and the 2018 Wimbledon girls' singles champion. She began playing regularly on the WTA Tour in 2019, and entered the top 50 at 18 years old after her first Tour final and a fourth-round appearance at the 2019 French Open. In 2020, Świątek won her first major at the French Open in dominant fashion, losing no more than five games in any singles match. She entered the top ten of the WTA rankings for the first time in May 2021.

In early 2022, Świątek surged into dominance with a 37-match winning streak, the longest on the WTA Tour in the 21st century, becoming world No. 1 in the process. With major titles at the French and US Opens, she finished 2022 as the world's best player. She repeated the year-end No. 1 feat in 2023 by defending her French Open title and claiming the WTA Finals, and won the French Open for a third straight edition in 2024. Świątek won her first grass court title at the 2025 Wimbledon Championships. She has claimed the French Open title at four of her eight appearances at the tournament, having never lost a match before the fourth round. In 2024 Świątek was suspended for one month for a drug found in contaminated sleep medication.

Świątek has an all-court playing style. She won the WTA Fan Favorite Shot of the Year in 2019 with a drop shot from the baseline, and was voted WTA Fan Favorite Singles Player of the Year in 2020. In 2023, she was named L'Équipe Champion of Champions and Polish Sports Personality of the Year and included on Time's annual list of the 100 most influential people in the world.

== Early life and background ==
Świątek was born on 31 May 2001 in Warsaw to Dorota and Tomasz Świątek. Her father is a former rower who competed in the men's quadruple sculls event at the 1988 Seoul Olympics, while her mother is an orthodontist. She has a sister, Agata, who is about three years older and is a dentist.

Their father wanted his daughters to become competitive athletes and preferred they take up an individual sport rather than a team sport to have better control of their chances of success. Agata started out as a swimmer but switched to tennis. She briefly competed on the ITF Junior Circuit in 2013 at about 15 years old, but stopped playing due to injuries. Świątek followed her sister into tennis because she wanted to beat her and also because she wanted to be more like her. Świątek trained at Mera Warsaw as a 14-year-old before later moving to Legia Warsaw.

== Juniors ==
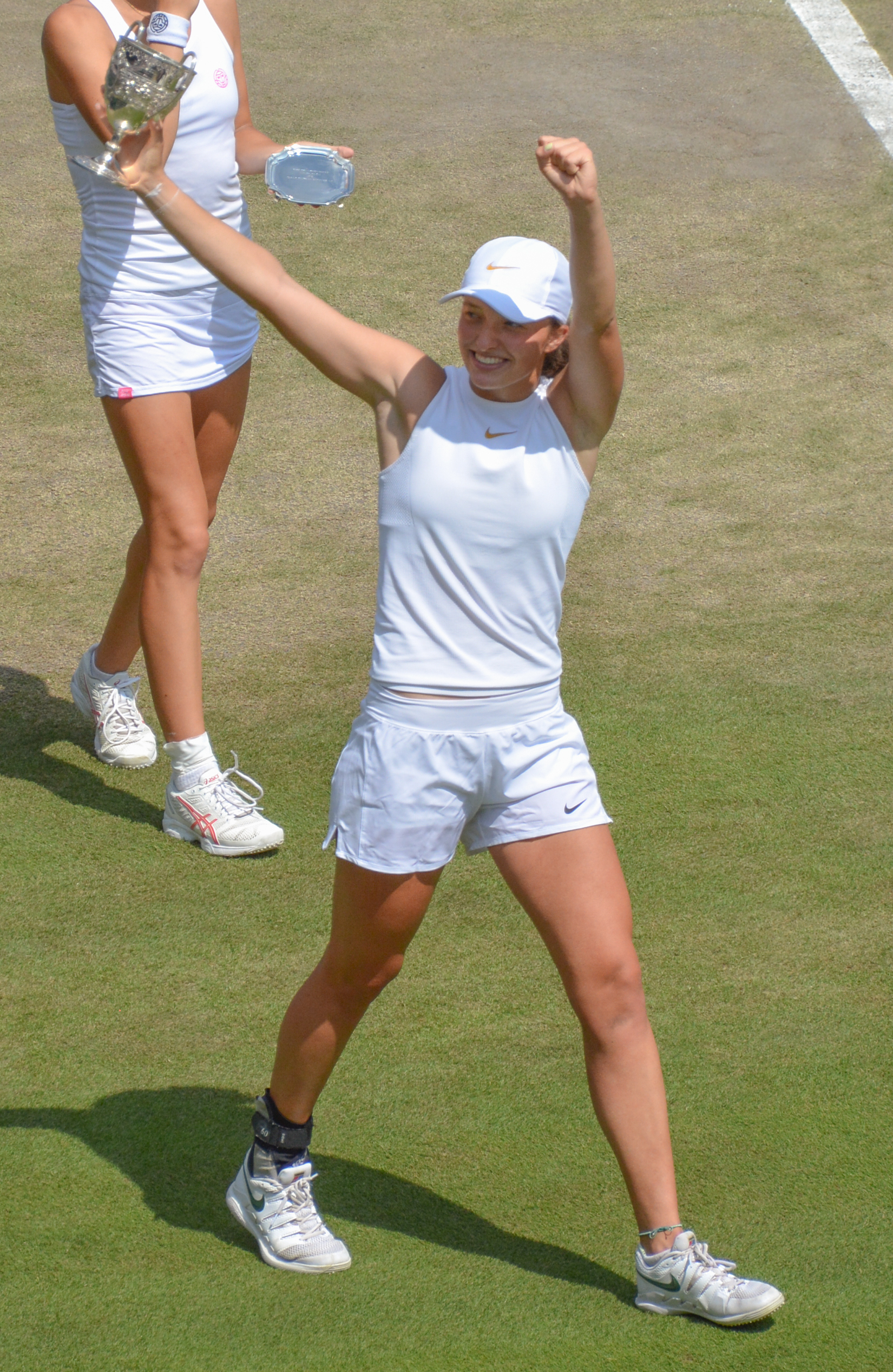
Świątek with the 2018 Wimbledon junior champion's trophy

Świątek reached a career-high ranking of No. 5 as a junior player. She began competing in ITF Junior Circuit events in 2015 and won back-to-back low-level Grade 4 titles in April and May at age 13. Before the end of the year, she moved up to Grade 2 events and finished runner-up in both singles and doubles at the Czech Junior Open. Świątek made her junior Grand Slam tournament debut in 2016 at the French Open, reaching the quarterfinals in both singles and doubles. She followed this up with her best junior title to date at the Grade 1 Canadian Open Junior Championships, defeating Olga Danilović in the final.

Świątek had a strong first half of 2017. She won both the singles and doubles titles at the Grade 1 Traralgon Junior International. Although she lost her opening round match at the Australian Open, she partnered with compatriot Maja Chwalińska to make her first final in a major tournament, finishing runner-up in doubles to the North American team of Bianca Andreescu and Carson Branstine. She then reached her first Grade A singles final at the Trofeo Bonfiglio, losing to Elena Rybakina. Her season came to an end after another quarterfinal at the French Open, after which she had right ankle surgery that kept her out for seven months.

Despite competing in only two Grand Slam tournaments in 2018 and three singles events in total, Świątek finished her junior career with her best season. She returned to the junior tour at the French Open after a one-year absence and reached the semi-finals in singles, losing to Caty McNally. She fared better in doubles, partnering with McNally to win her first junior major title. They defeated the Japanese team of Yuki Naito and Naho Sato in the final.

Świątek played only singles at Wimbledon. As an unseeded player due to her absence, she was drawn against top seed Whitney Osuigwe in the first round. After winning that match in three sets, she did not drop another set during the rest of the tournament and won the championship for her only junior major singles title. She defeated Leonie Küng in the final. Świątek then teamed up with the Slovenian Kaja Juvan to compete in the 2018 Summer Youth Olympics. They reached the final and defeated the Japanese team of Yuki Naito and Naho Sato. She then finished her junior career.

== Professional ==
=== 2016–2018: Seven ITF Circuit championships ===
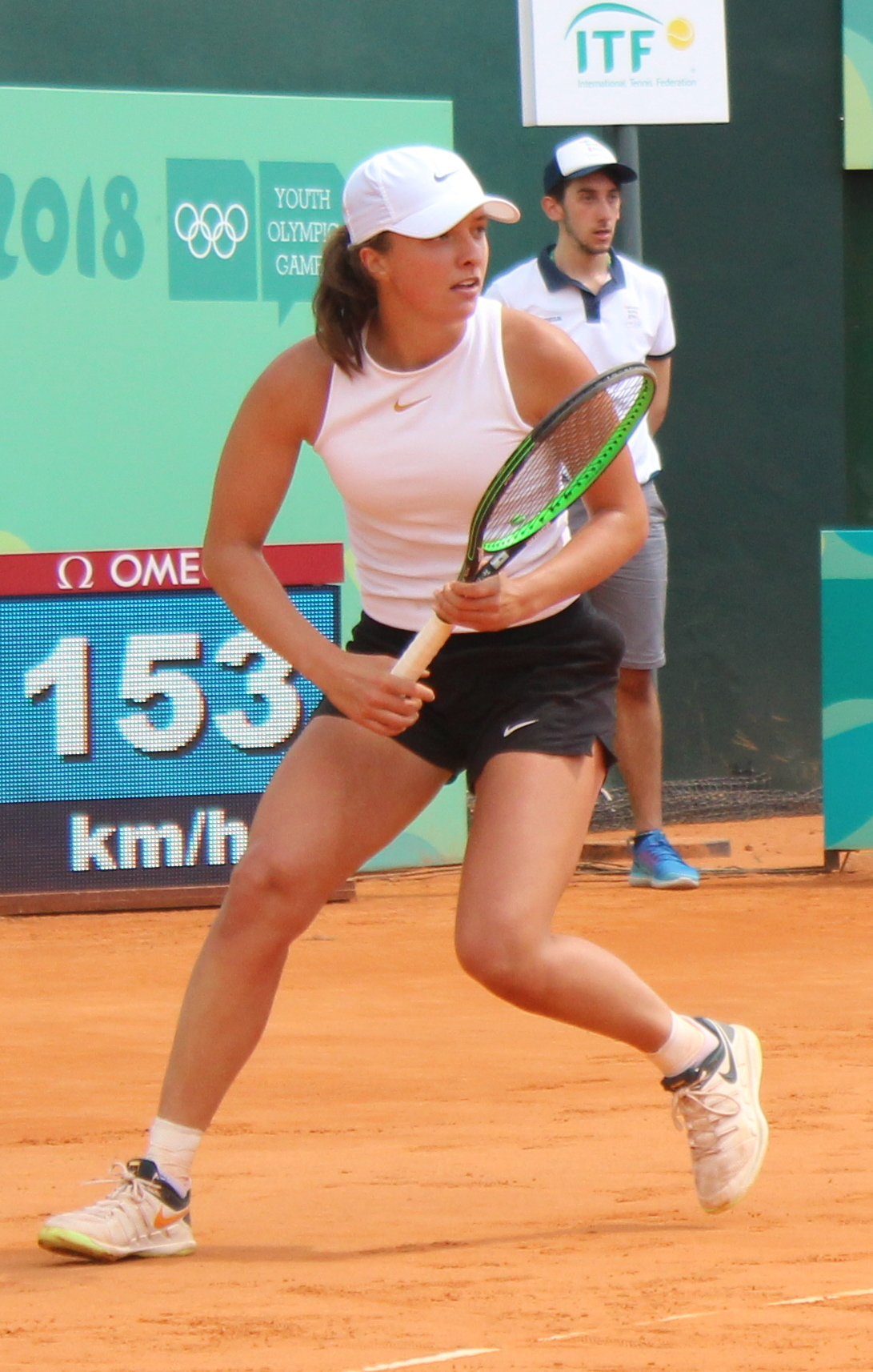
Świątek at the 2018 Summer Youth Olympics

Świątek began competing on the ITF Women's Circuit in 2016 and played on the circuit through the end of 2018. She won all seven ITF singles finals she reached, ranging from the first four at the $10k to $15k level to one at the $25k level followed up by two at the $60k level. Her first three titles came at 15 years old. The fourth was in February 2018 in her first tournament back from a seven-month layoff due to injury. After a $25k title in April, Świątek moved up to higher-level ITF events later that month. Following her junior Wimbledon title in July, she skipped the junior US Open to stay in Europe. During the two weeks of the US Open, she won back-to-back $60k titles at the NEK Ladies Open in Hungary and the Montreux Ladies Open in Switzerland. During the second event, she defeated top seed and world No. 120, Mariana Duque-Mariño. These were Świątek's last two ITF tournaments of the year. With these two titles, she entered the top 200 for the first time at the age of 17, rising from No. 298 to No. 180 in those two weeks.

=== 2019: First WTA Tour final, top 50 ===
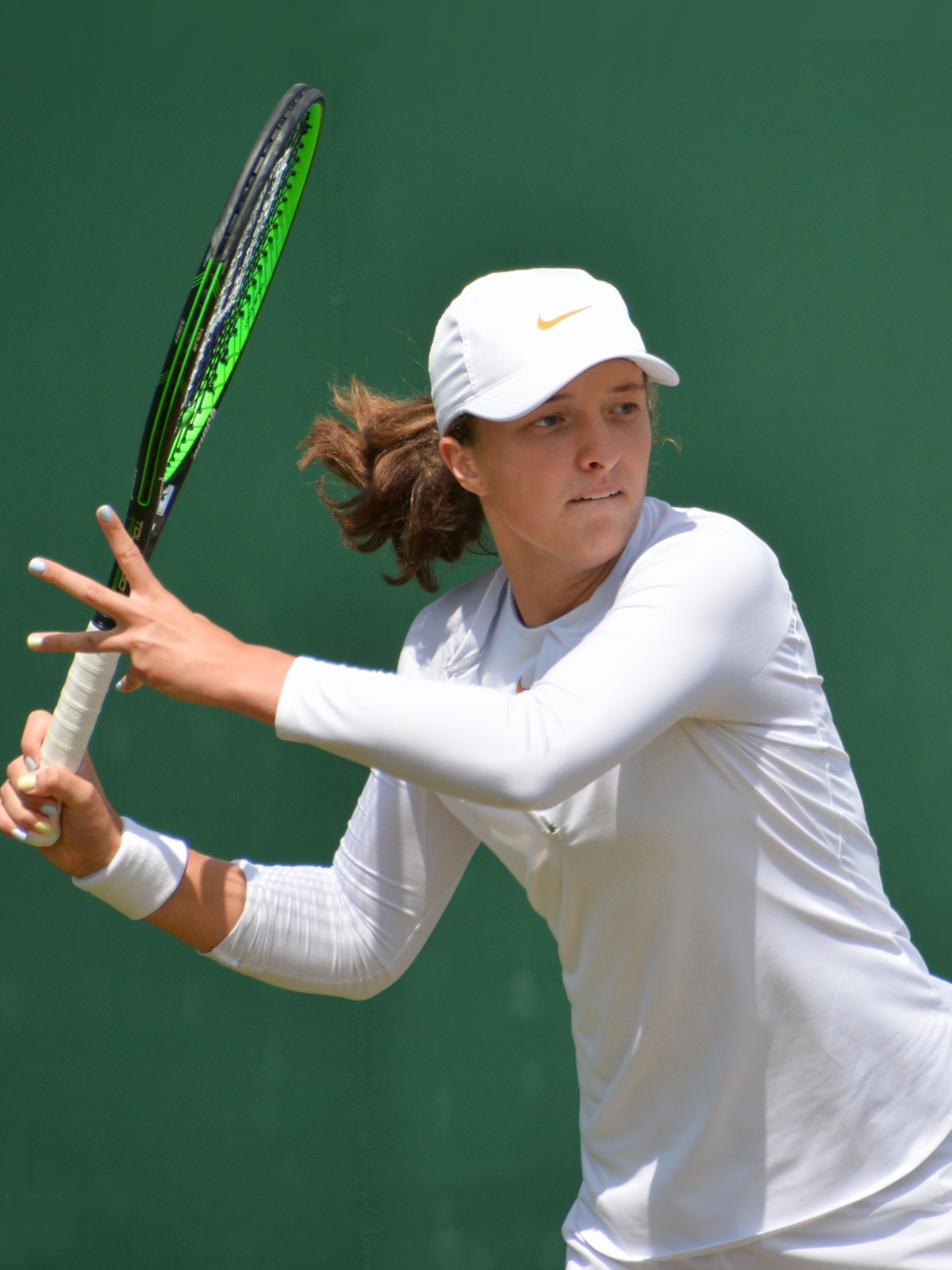
Świątek hitting a forehand at 2018 Wimbledon

Despite never playing on the WTA Tour before 2019, Świątek was able to compete in only tour-level events throughout the year. After failing to qualify at the Auckland Open, she qualified for her first major main draw at the Australian Open. She then defeated No. 82 Ana Bogdan, in three sets, in her debut match to reach the second round. At her next three tournaments, she also qualified at the Hungarian Ladies Open, but not at either of the Premier Mandatory events in March.

Świątek made her first WTA breakthrough at the Ladies Open Lugano in April. With her first direct acceptance into a main draw, she made her first WTA final. During the event, she upset No. 3 seed Viktória Kužmová in the second round for her first top-50 victory. She ultimately finished runner-up to Polona Hercog in three sets. Moreover, a precise cross-court forehand drop shot she hit against Kristýna Plíšková in the semi-final was voted the 2019 WTA Shot of the Year. With the runner-up, she also made her debut in the top 100 while still 17 years old. Świątek closed out her clay court season with a fourth-round appearance at the French Open in her second major. She upset No. 16 Wang Qiang in the second round for her first top-20 victory before losing to defending champion Simona Halep.

Świątek could not repeat her French Open success at the remaining major tournaments of the year, losing her opening match at Wimbledon and in the second round at the US Open. Her best result in the second half of the season was a third-round appearance at the Canadian Open. During the event, she upset No. 18, Caroline Wozniacki, before losing to No. 2, Naomi Osaka. With this result, she entered the top 50 for the first time a week later. She missed the rest of the season after the US Open to undergo foot surgery and finished the year at No. 61 in the world.

Świątek finished 2019 as runner-up to Simona Halep in the voting for the WTA Fan Favorite Singles Player of the Year award.

=== 2020: French Open champion, top 20 ===
Świątek made her return to the WTA Tour at the Australian Open. She matched her best result at a major with another fourth-round appearance, this time highlighted by a victory over No. 20, Donna Vekić. She defeated Vekić again at the Qatar Open, her last match win before the WTA Tour was shut down for six months due to the COVID-19 pandemic. Świątek continued her major tournament success once the tour resumed. She reached the third round at the US Open, losing to eventual runner-up Victoria Azarenka.

Entering the rescheduled French Open in September, Świątek was ranked No. 54 in the world. Nonetheless, she won the singles event for her maiden WTA title. During the tournament, she defeated 2019 runner-up and world No. 19, Markéta Vondroušová, in the opening round. Her biggest upset was a victory in the fourth round over top seed and world No. 2, Simona Halep, who was on a 17-match win streak and was also the heavy favourite to win the title. She only lost three games against Halep after winning just one game against her in the same round of the French Open the previous year. Świątek defeated world No. 6, Sofia Kenin, in the final to become the first Polish (Note: Defined here as a player representing Poland. 2018 Australian Open winner Caroline Wozniacki was born to Polish parents, but represented Denmark. Similarly the 3 time major winner Angelique Kerber was born to Polish-German Parents but represented Germany) player to win a major singles title and the lowest-ranked French Open champion in the history of the WTA rankings. She also became the youngest singles champion at the tournament since Rafael Nadal in 2005 and the youngest women's singles winner since Monica Seles in 1992. She won the title without dropping a set or more than five games to any opponent, and the 28 games she lost in total were tied for the second-fewest among French Open singles champions in the Open Era behind only the 20 games Steffi Graf lost in 1988. With the title, Świątek rose to No. 17 in the world. She also played the doubles event, partnering with Nicole Melichar for the first time. The pair reached the semi-finals, and also did not drop a set until their last match.

In 2020, Świątek was voted the WTA Fan Favorite Singles Player of the Year.

=== 2021: Italian Open champion, top 10 ===
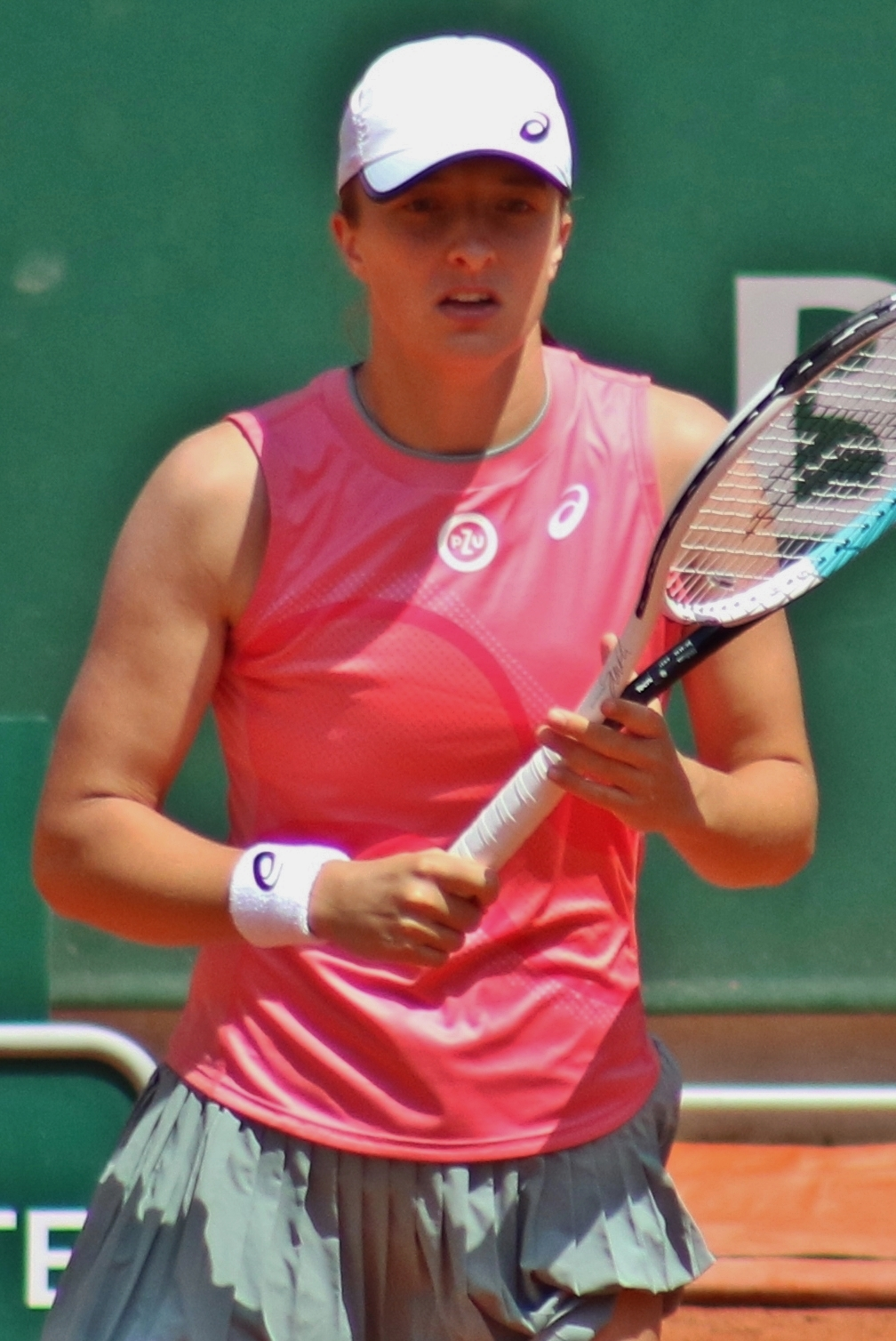
Świątek at the 2021 French Open

At the Australian Open, Świątek was seeded 15th and recorded wins over Arantxa Rus, Camila Giorgi and Fiona Ferro. She reached the fourth round where she lost to Simona Halep, in three sets. At Adelaide, she won her first WTA Tour title without dropping a set in the whole tournament. She defeated Belinda Bencic in the final, in straight sets. As a result, she entered the top 15 for the first time in her career, in March 2021.

Seeded 15th, Świątek won her first career WTA 1000-title at the Italian Open, defeating former champion Karolína Plíšková in just 46 minutes without the loss of a single game. She advanced to the final after defeating two-time champion and world No. 5, Elina Svitolina, and the second best-ranked teenager Coco Gauff on the same day, as well as saving match points in her third-round match against Barbora Krejčíková. Świątek became the third player to win a title after saving match point en route in 2021, alongside Naomi Osaka at the Australian Open and Ashleigh Barty in Miami. She also became the fourth teenager to win a WTA 1000 event. This successful run to her third career title moved her into the top 10 in the singles rankings on 17 May 2021, as world No. 9.

At the French Open, Świątek was seeded at No. 8. She opened her title defense winning against Kaja Juvan in the first round, and then defeated Rebecca Peterson, Anett Kontaveit and Marta Kostyuk. She won 22 straight sets at the French Open but then lost in the quarterfinals to Maria Sakkari. In doubles, seeded 14th with Bethanie Mattek-Sands as a pair, playing just their third event together, they reached the final where they were defeated by Barbora Krejčíková and Kateřina Siniaková in straight sets. As a result, Świątek reached the top 50 at a career-high ranking of No. 42 in doubles for the first time in her career.

She started her grass-court season at the Eastbourne International where she was seeded at No. 4. After defeating Heather Watson, she lost to Daria Kasatkina in the second round. As the seventh seed at Wimbledon, Świątek defeated Hsieh Su-wei, Vera Zvonareva, and Irina-Camelia Begu, all in straight sets. In the fourth round, she lost to Ons Jabeur, in three sets. With her win over Anett Kontaveit in the third round of the US Open, she became the only player to have reached the second week of all four major championships in the 2021 season. She qualified for the WTA Finals for the first time in her career.

=== 2022: Two Major titles, 37-match win streak, world No. 1 ===
Świątek started her season by reaching the semifinals at the Adelaide International. She then reached another semifinal at the Australian Open. Following a second-round match loss against Jeļena Ostapenko, Świątek won the next six tournaments she entered — Qatar Ladies Open, Indian Wells Open, Miami Open, Stuttgart Open, Italian Open and, for her second major title, French Open — before losing to Alizé Cornet at Wimbledon in the third round. Świątek reached the world No. 1 singles ranking, and became the fourth as well as the youngest woman (11th player overall) to complete the Sunshine Double in the process. She also accumulated a 37-match win streak, the longest by a woman in the 21st century. Świątek had a lacklustre performance throughout the summer. She lost to Caroline Garcia in the quarterfinals in Warsaw, Beatriz Haddad Maia in the third round in Toronto and Madison Keys in the third round in Cincinnati. However, she returned on form at the US Open, winning her third major by defeating Ons Jabeur in the final. She became the first woman to win both the French Open and US Open in the same season since Serena Williams in 2013.

Świątek reached the final at the Ostrava Open, but she lost to Barbora Krejčíková in a three-set match that lasted 3 hours and 16 minutes, the longest match of her career so far. She subsequently played at the San Diego Open, winning her eighth title by defeating Donna Vekić, in three sets. At the 2022 WTA Finals held in Fort Worth, Texas, Świątek won the group stage without dropping a set, defeating Daria Kasatkina, Caroline Garcia and Coco Gauff, respectively. However, she was upset by Aryna Sabalenka in the semi-finals in three sets. Nevertheless, she finished the season as year-end No. 1 and posted a record win-loss 67–9 in 2022, the most wins in a single season since Serena Williams in 2013. She also became the first player since Serena Williams in 2013 to collect over 11,000 ranking points in a single season. She accumulated the second highest ranking points total in WTA history, second only to Serena Williams in 2013.

=== 2023: French Open and WTA Finals champion ===
Świątek's 2023 campaign was statistically less dominant than her 2022 season, but she still managed to win six titles in the year. She started 2023 as only the fourth woman in WTA history to be ranked world No. 1 for 40 or more consecutive weeks in their first stint as the top-ranked player. In her first tournament of the year representing Poland at the United Cup, she partnered with her compatriots including Hubert Hurkacz and reached the semi-finals. At the Australian Open, she lost in the fourth round in straight sets against Elena Rybakina, who would upset Świątek two more times later in the year, respectively in the semi-finals at the Indian Wells Open and in the quarterfinals at the Italian Open.

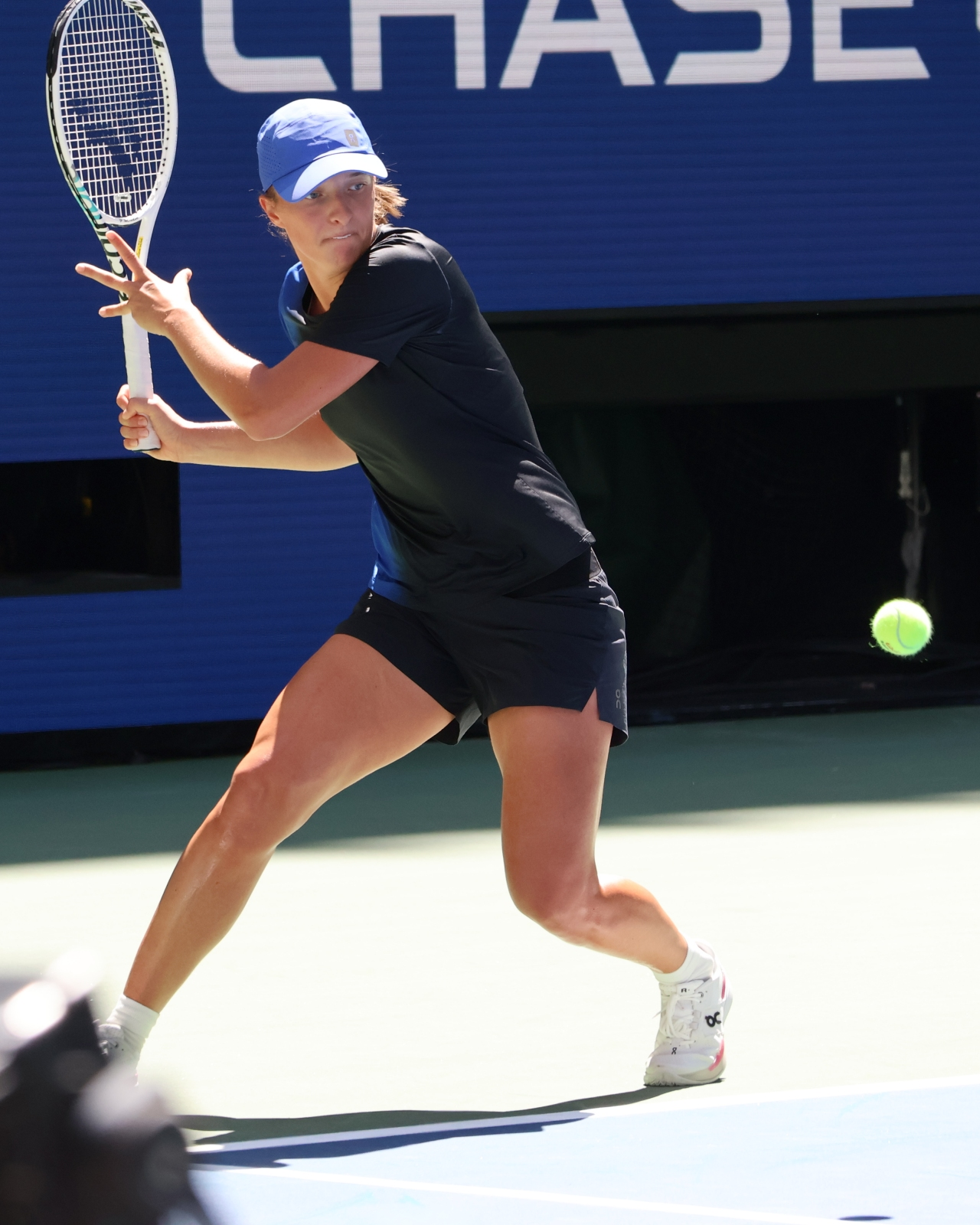
Świątek practicing her forehand before 2023 US Open

She did not win any tournament until the Qatar Ladies Open, where she did not drop a set throughout the tournament and lost only five games. The clay season saw her successfully defend her Stuttgart Open title, as well as win her fourth major at the French Open by defeating Karolína Muchová in the final. After improvement on the grass court with a quarterfinal performance at Wimbledon, which ended her 14-match win streak, she won her home tournament at the Poland Open.

At the US Open, Świątek lost in the fourth round to Jelena Ostapenko, which ended her reign at world No. 1. Her 75-week reign at No. 1 is the third-longest streak in the Open Era among players in their first stint as the top player, behind only Steffi Graf and Martina Hingis. Nevertheless, she went on to win the China Open. At the WTA Finals, she won the title without dropping a set, becoming the first player to do so since Serena Williams in 2012. She also dropped just 20 games throughout the entire tournament, the fewest since the reintroduction of the round-robin format in 2003 and beat Serena Williams's record of 32 overall games dropped. By conceding only one game to Jessica Pegula, Świątek also broke the record for fewest games lost in a final, previously held by Martina Navratilova in 1983 and Kim Clijsters in 2003 (two each). Winning the title saw her reclaiming the top ranking and clinching year-end No. 1 for the second season in a row.

=== 2024: French Open three-peat, Olympic bronze, suspension ===
Świątek entered the United Cup in an international team competition representing Team Poland. She reached the final winning all of her singles matches and received the MVP award of the event. In the third round of the Australian Open, she was defeated by Linda Nosková in three sets and as a result of this loss her 18-match winning streak, which started in September 2023, came to an end.

In February, Świątek entered the Qatar Ladies Open as a two-time defending champion. She reached the final, having defeated Sorana Cîrstea, Ekaterina Alexandrova and Viktoria Azarenka. In the final, she faced Elena Rybakina, winning in straight sets and claiming her seventh WTA 1000 title. Świątek did not drop a set en route to the title for the second consecutive year. She also became the first person to win three consecutive titles in Doha and the first player to win three consecutive titles at the same hardcourt tournament since Serena Williams in 2015. At the next WTA 1000 tournament in Dubai, she reached back-to-back quarterfinals defeating Elina Svitolina in the round of 16. She was the fourth player since the WTA-1000 format's introduction in 2009 the make the quarterfinals in 9+ consecutive appearances (between Dubai 2023 – Dubai 2024) after Serena Williams, Maria Sharapova and Agnieszka Radwańska. She then advanced to the semifinals where she lost to Anna Kalinskaya in straight sets.

In March, Świątek won the Indian Wells Open for a second time, defeating Maria Sakkari in the final. This was her second title of the season and 19th overall. In Miami, she recorded her 100th WTA 1000 career match win defeating Camila Giorgi in straight sets.

In April, Świątek entered the Stuttgart Open as a two-time defending champion and reached the semifinal where she lost to Elena Rybakina in three sets, which ended her 10-match winning streak in the tournament. In the same month, she entered her 100th week as the reigning world No. 1 surpassing Lindsay Davenport and moving to the ninth place in the all-time table. At the Madrid Open, she reached the final where she faced the defending champion and second seed, Aryna Sabalenka. Świątek played the longest match against Sabalenka in her career thus far, which lasted over three hours. Świątek saved three championship points in the third set and won her 20th career title. The match was called the best of their rivalry, with Świątek stating that it was "the most intense and crazy final" she has played.

In May, at the Italian Open, she reached a second consecutive final with a win over world No. 3, Coco Gauff, in straight sets. In the final, she beat Aryna Sabalenka, this time in straight sets, becoming the most successful Polish tennis player in terms of the number of titles won surpassing Agnieszka Radwańska with 21. It was also her tenth WTA 1000 title and fourth on clay, and the third in Rome. She became the third female player after Serena Williams and Dinara Safina to complete the Madrid-Rome double, and the first player, female or male, to achieve it since 2013 when both Williams and Rafael Nadal won Madrid and Rome.

Świątek won the 2024 French Open, which was her third French Open title in a row and fourth overall. Świątek lost one set during the tournament, which was to Naomi Osaka in the second round, in which Osaka held match point in the third set. After defeating Osaka, Świątek lost only 17 games, defeating Marie Bouzková in the third round, Anastasia Potapova in the fourth round, Markéta Vondroušová in the quarterfinal, Coco Gauff in the semi-final, and Jasmine Paolini in the final. Świątek became the third player in history to win three consecutive French Open titles, after Monica Seles and Justine Henin, and the second woman to win Madrid, Rome, and the French Open in the same season, after Serena Williams in 2013.

Having not played since her French Open triumph, Świątek lost in round three at the 2024 Wimbledon Championships to Yulia Putintseva, thus ending her 21-match winning streak.

At the 2024 Summer Olympics, Świątek defeated Irina-Camelia Begu, Diane Parry, Wang Xiyu and Danielle Collins. In the semifinal, she lost to the eventual gold medalist Zheng Qinwen in straight sets. This marked Świątek's first loss in Paris after 1,149 days of staying undefeated. In the bronze-medal match, she beat Anna Karolína Schmiedlová in straight sets, becoming the first player from Poland to win an Olympic medal in tennis.

At the Cincinnati Open, Świątek reached the semifinals where she lost to Aryna Sabalenka. At the 2024 US Open, Świątek lost in the quarterfinals to Jessica Pegula. She played at the WTA Finals as the No. 2 seed and defending champion, but lost to Coco Gauff in two sets. Her defeat meant Sabalenka would finish the year as WTA No. 1. The ITF proclaimed Świątek its year-end world champion for 2024.

Świątek received a one-month suspension in November 2024 following a positive test for a banned substance trimetazidine. The drug was found to be a contaminant in a sleep medication melatonin she was taking, so she was handed a penalty that was at the lowest end of the range for "No Significant Fault or Negligence". Nevertheless, she had to miss three tournaments while her case was being considered and forfeit her prize money from the Cincinnati Open.

=== 2025: Wimbledon champion, Career Surface Slam ===
Świątek entered the United Cup representing Team Poland for the third time in her career. With her team, Świątek advanced to the final that was won by Team United States. In this edition, Świątek played five singles matches and lost only one of them, against Coco Gauff in the final tie. She also played two mixed doubles matches: one alongside Hubert Hurkacz and the other alongside Jan Zieliński. She and her partners won both those matches.

At the Australian Open, Świątek made it to her first semifinal since 2022, but lost to eventual champion Madison Keys in three sets despite winning the first set and holding a match point in the deciding set. At the Qatar Ladies Open, Świątek reached the semifinals, before losing to Jeļena Ostapenko extending their head-to-head to 0–5. She was then defeated in the quarter-finals of the Dubai Championships by the eventual champion, Mirra Andreeva. In the semifinals of the Indian Wells Open, Świątek again lost to Andreeva, this time in three sets.

During the clay-court season, Świątek failed to defend both her Madrid and Italian Open titles, winning only one game in both sets against Coco Gauff in the Madrid semifinal (her lowest number of game wins on clay since the 2019 French Open), and suffered a third-round loss to Danielle Collins in Rome. As a result, Świątek fell to world No. 5, her lowest ranking since March 2022.

At the French Open, Świątek was seeded fifth, beating former major champions Emma Raducanu and Elena Rybakina, the latter of which lasted three sets despite Świątek's being a set and a break behind. After beating Elina Svitolina in the quarterfinals, Świątek lost her semifinal match to Sabalenka in three sets. This marked the first time Świątek did not reach the final since 2021, and snapped her 26-match-winning streak at the French Open. As a result, she dropped further in the rankings to No. 7.

During the grass-court season, Świątek reached the final of the Bad Homburg Open by defeating Jasmine Paolini in the semifinals. This marked her first tour-level final on grass, with her previous best result being reaching the semifinal at the same tournament. In the final, she lost to Jessica Pegula.

At Wimbledon, Świątek continued her career-best grass-court form to reach the semifinal for the first time, in which she defeated Belinda Bencic to the loss of only two games to make her first Wimbledon final. She defeated Amanda Anisimova 6–0, 6–0 in their first professional matchup to win her first Wimbledon title. It was the first double bagel women's singles Wimbledon final since 1911.

Świątek claimed a maiden victory at the Cincinnati Open in August. After defeating Elena Rybakina in the semi-finals, she then triumphed over Jasmine Paolini to seal the title. Świątek did not drop a set during the tournament. She then entered the mixed doubles at the 2025 US Open, which were held the week prior to the singles draw. She and doubles partner Casper Ruud were defeated in the final by Sara Errani and Andrea Vavassori. In the singles draw, she exited the tournament in the quarter-finals after being overcome by Amanda Anisimova in straight sets.

At the WTA Finals, Świątek won her opening round-robin group game against Madison Keys, but then suffered successive defeats to Elena Rybakina and Amanda Anisimova to exit the tournament.

=== 2026: Canadian Open and United Cup champion ===
In January, Świątek was part of the Polish team that defeated Switzerland in the final of the United Cup. She lost her opening singles match of the final to Belinda Bencic, but Poland went on to win the next two matches to win the tournament for the first time. Her attempt to complete a Career Grand Slam at the 2026 Australian Open ended at the quarterfinal stage. She was defeated in straight sets by eventual champion Elena Rybakina. Świątek reached the quarterfinals of the Qatar Open, losing to Maria Sakkari, and then withdrew from the Dubai Tennis Championship. She then progressed to the quarterfinals of the BNP Paribas Open where she was defeated by Elina Svitolina. Świątek also dropped to No. 3 again after Rybakina reached the final.

Świątek then lost her opening match in Miami to compatriot Magda Linette, ending a streak of 73 opening match wins. On March 23, 2026, shortly after the Miami exit, Świątek announced a coaching split with Wim Fissette. Despite winning her first Wimbledon title under his guidance in 2025, the pair decided to part ways following her dip in form during the early 2026 hardcourt swing. Świątek consulted with Rafael Nadal regarding her coaching set-up and subsequently appointed his former coach Francisco Roig to her coaching team.

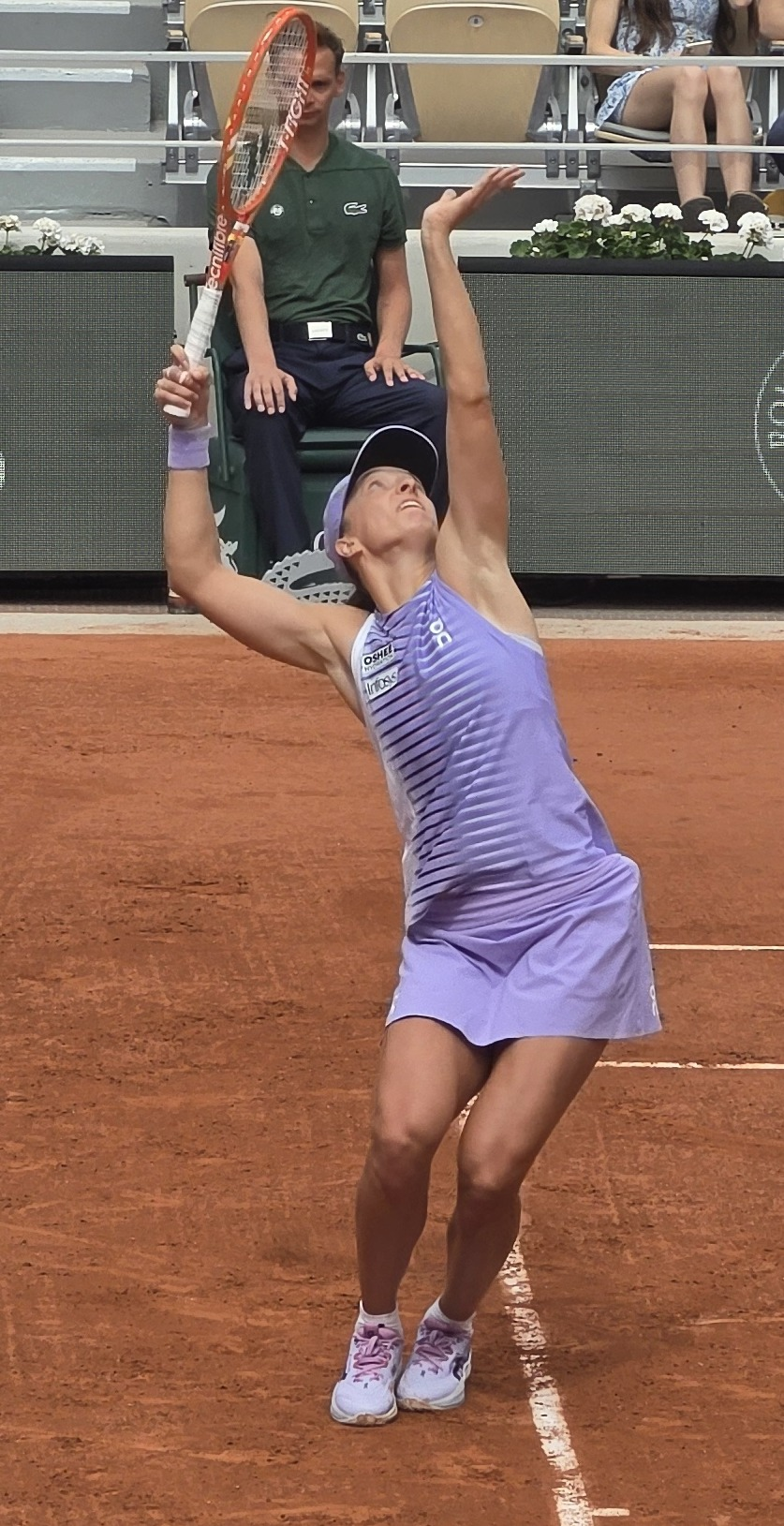
Świątek at the 2026 French Open

During the clay season, Świątek reached the semifinals of the Italian Open as top seed, where she was beaten by Elina Svitolina. At the French Open, she exited in the fourth round following a straight sets defeat to Marta Kostyuk. Her defeat meant that she had not won a clay court title since her French Open win in 2024.

Świątek began her grass court season in Bad Homburg, where she lost her opening match to Emma Navarro in three sets. It was her second straight loss to the American. Seeded third at Wimbledon, she opened her title defence with a win over American doubles specialist Taylor Townsend. Her tournament ended following a third-round defeat to Alexandra Eala.

On August 13, Świątek defeated Elena Rybakina in straight sets to win the Canadian Open in Toronto, her first WTA Tour-level title of 2026 and the 26th of her career. The following week, she advanced to the semifinals of the Cincinnati Open, where she was defeated by Jessica Pegula. At the US Open, Świątek progressed to the fourth round, where she lost to Zheng Qinwen in straight sets, despite a 5–0 lead in the opening set. After losing the semifinals of the Wuhan Open to compatriot and eventual champion, Maja Chwalińska, she withdrew from the Ningbo Open due to a thigh injury, ending her season.

== National representation ==
=== Junior competitions ===
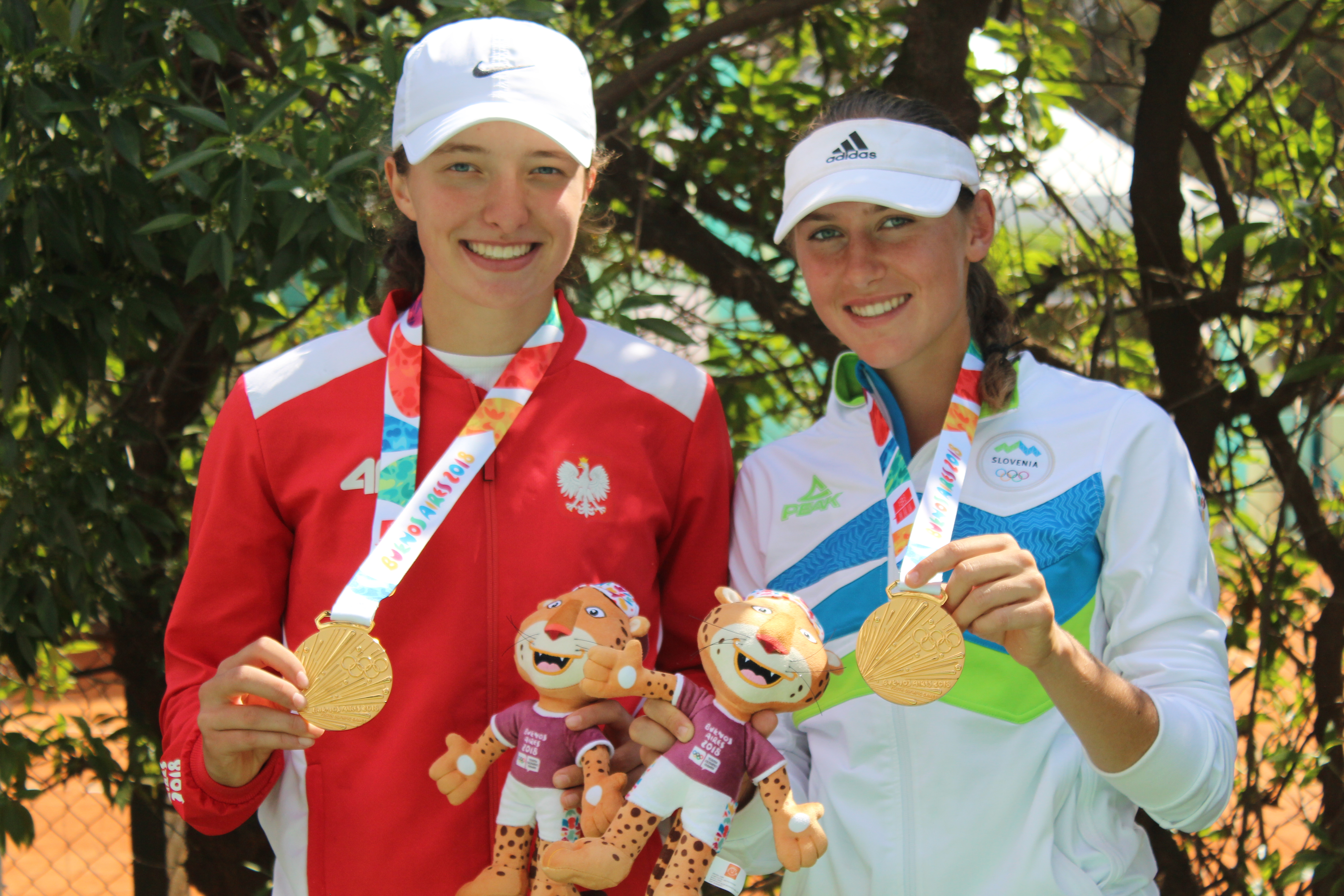
Świątek (left) and Kaja Juvan, the 2018 Summer Youth Olympics gold medallists in girls' doubles

Świątek represented Poland at the ITF World Junior Tennis Finals for 14-and-under girls twice in 2014 and 2015. She won all of her matches in 2014 to lead Poland to a ninth-place finish out of 16 teams. The following year, she helped Poland go undefeated in the round-robin stage to reach the semi-finals. Świątek moved up to the 16-and-under Junior Fed Cup in 2016, where she played alongside Maja Chwalińska and Stefania Rogozińska-Dzik. Poland won the title, defeating the United States 2–1 in the final. Świątek won both of her rubbers in the final tie, defeating Amanda Anisimova in singles before partnering with Chwalińska to defeat Caty McNally and Claire Liu in the decisive doubles rubber. The last event of Świątek's junior career was the 2018 Summer Youth Olympic Games. Although she lost in the quarterfinals in singles to Clara Burel, she partnered with Slovenian Kaja Juvan to win the gold medal in doubles. In the final they defeated Naito and Sato, who were also Świątek's opponents in the French Open doubles final earlier in the year.

=== Billie Jean King Cup ===
Świątek made her senior Billie Jean King Cup debut in 2018 when Poland was in Europe/Africa Zone Group I. (Note: The Billie Jean King Cup was known as the Fed Cup until 2020.) To advance out of this group, Poland needed to win their round-robin group, a play-off tie against one of the other round-robin group winners, and then another play-off tie as part of the separate World Group II Play-off round. They did not win their round-robin group in 2018 or 2019. Świątek won her only singles match in 2018. While she won only one of her three singles matches in 2019, she won both of her doubles rubbers while partnering with Alicja Rosolska. The following year, the format was changed so that Poland needed to finish in only the top two out of three teams in their round-robin group to reach the promotional play-off. Nonetheless, they won their group and defeated Sweden 2–0 in the play-off to advance to the separate Play-off round. Świątek won all three of her singles matches in the 2020 Europe/Africa Zone Group I round, before skipping the Play-offs themselves. The following edition in 2022 had Poland facing Romania in the qualifying round, with Świątek winning her two games to help the team move on to the Finals. However, she did not attend the finals because the decisive round started very soon after the 2022 WTA Finals. The rib injury Świątek encountered shortly after exiting the 2023 Indian Wells Open also caused her to miss Poland's 2023 Billie Jean King cup qualifier against Kazakhstan in Astana. Overall, Świątek has a 9–3 record at the Fed Cup, comprising 7–2 in singles and 2–1 in doubles. In 2024, Świątek participated in a match against Switzerland winning two matches in singles and contributing to Poland's 4–0 win, which secured the country's place in November's Finals in Seville for a third consecutive year.

Świątek helped Poland reach the semifinals of the 2024 BJK Cup with wins in singles and in doubles partnering compatriot Katarzyna Kawa over Czechia. It was the first semifinals in the BJK Cup Finals in their nation's history.

== Rivalries ==
=== Aryna Sabalenka ===
Świątek and Aryna Sabalenka have met 13 times since 2021, with Świątek leading the head-to-head at 8–5 in official competitions. Their rivalry is seen as having a potential to be counted among those that shape the history of tennis. Their most lauded match is the 2024 Madrid Open final in which Świątek defeated defending champion Sabalenka in three sets after 3 hours and 11 minutes, also saving three championship points in the process. Sabalenka would end Świątek's 26-match winning streak at the French Open by defeating her in the 2025 French Open semifinal 7–6(1), 4–6, 6–0.

=== Coco Gauff ===
Świątek and Coco Gauff have met 16 times since 2021, with Świątek leading the head-to-head at 11–5 in official competitions. Their last four matches, three of which being the 2024 WTA Finals, 2025 United Cup final, and again at the 2026 United Cup semifinal were won by Gauff. They have played each other three times at majors, with all of these matches won by Świątek in straight sets: 2022 French Open final, 2023 French Open quarterfinal, and 2024 French Open semifinal.

=== Elena Rybakina ===
Świątek has developed a prominent rivalry with Elena Rybakina. The two have met 14 times since 2021, with Świątek leading the head-to-head at 8–6 in official competitions. Rybakina had led earlier in their careers before Świątek began to pull ahead. Swiatek defeated Rybakina to win her seventh WTA 1000 title at the 2024 Qatar TotalEnergies Open. Rybakina came back from a set down to snap a 4-match losing streak in 2025 WTA Finals in Riyadh. Rybakina would defeat her again at the 2026 Australian Open quarterfinals in straight sets.

=== Jeļena Ostapenko ===
As of June 2025, Jeļena Ostapenko leads Iga Świątek 6–0 in their head-to-head, making her the only active player to have an undefeated record against Świątek across multiple matches. Their encounters span all surfaces, with Ostapenko claiming key wins at the 2023 US Open and the 2025 Stuttgart Open. Her aggressive, high-risk style has consistently unsettled Świątek.

== Playing style ==
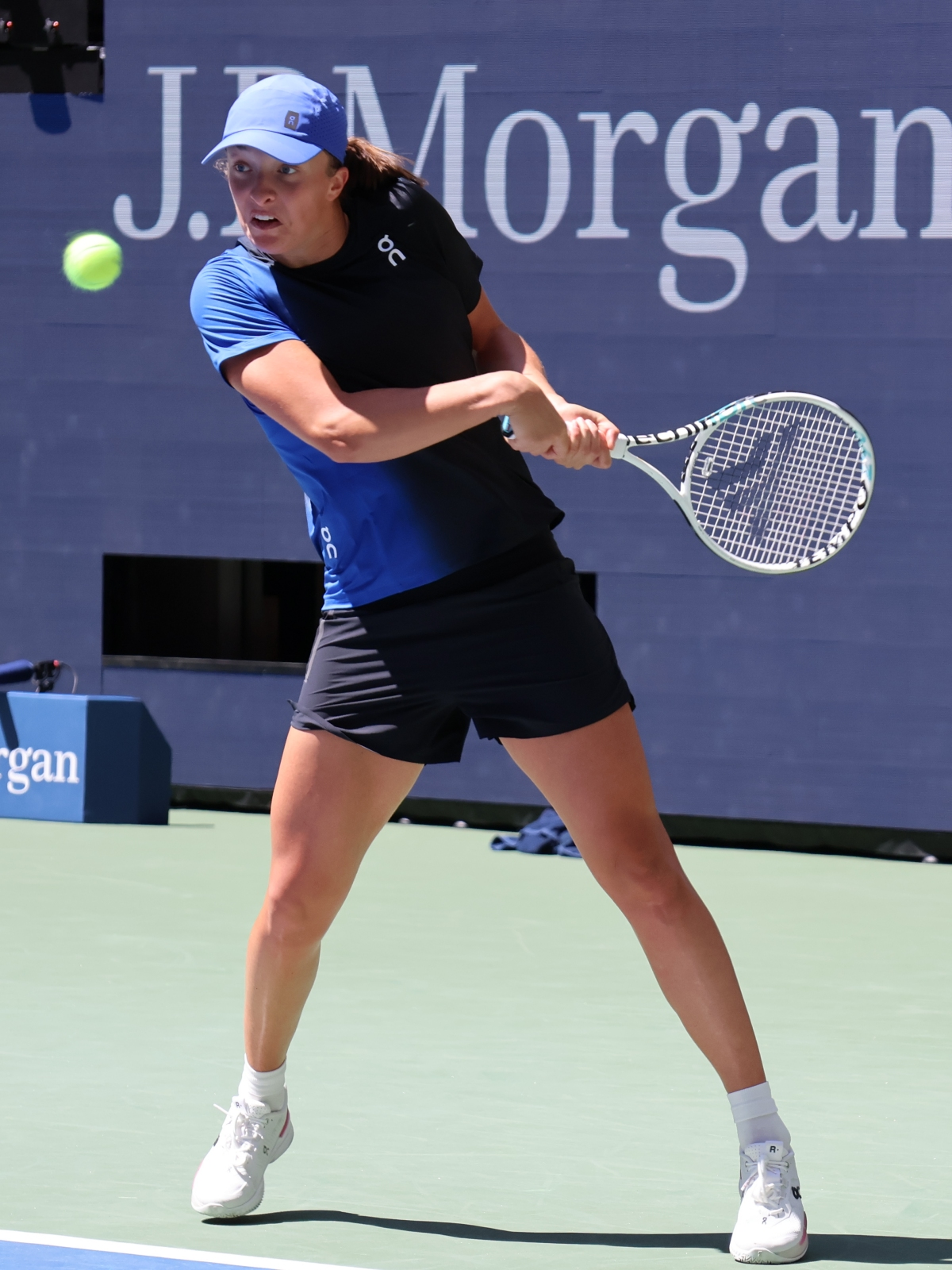
Świątek hitting a backhand at the 2023 US Open

Świątek has an aggressive, all-court style of play and incorporates a lot of variety into her game. Because her game style is focused on offence, she typically generates high amounts of both winners and unforced errors. She has described her style of play on clay as "a big serve, topspin, and backhand down the line". Despite her aggressive style of play, she plays with margin, and constructs points carefully until she creates an opportunity to hit a winner, and in all seven of her matches played at the 2020 French Open, she hit more winners than unforced errors. In total at the French Open that year, she hit 175 winners to 127 unforced errors. The basis of Świątek's game was described by tennis journalist Christopher Clarey for The New York Times as: her sliding ability, allowing her to defend from the corners à la Kim Clijsters and Novak Djokovic, a "sprinter's speed" when moving forward to the net, power and topspin akin to her idol Rafael Nadal, and mental strength forged through sports psychology.

Her forehand and backhand are fast and powerful, with her forehand being hit with significant topspin due to her employing an extreme western grip; on her run to the title at the French Open in 2020, Świątek's average forehand speed was 73 mph (117 km/h), only 4 km/h below that of the average male forehand speed. She even hit some forehands up to 79 mph (127 km/h), the fastest of any female player in the draw and exceeded only by Jannik Sinner on the men's side. Her forehand topspin reached 3,453 rpm at the French Open, comparable with her idol Rafael Nadal. Świątek's backhand speed peaked at 76 mph (122 km/h) at the French Open, the fastest of any female player in the draw, and equal to Dominic Thiem's backhand speed, the fastest of any male player at the French Open. Considering her dominance on clay, Świątek is often called the "Queen of Clay".

Świątek aims to come to the net, and has good volleying skills due to her doubles experience. Świątek possesses an accurate first serve, peaking at 123 mph (198 km/h), and averaging at 108 mph (174 km/h), allowing her to serve aces, dictate play from the first stroke, and win a majority of first-serve points. She possesses an effective kick serve, and an effective slice serve, which are deployed as second serves, preventing opponents from scoring free points. In earlier years of her career, she regularly used the drop shot, and won the 2019 WTA Shot of the Year with a cross-court drop shot from the baseline that landed on the sideline well inside the service box. Since the beginning of her collaboration with Tomasz Wiktorowski, she simplified her game and currently very rarely employs this shot. Świątek aims to gain the advantage in a point by hitting the ball early on the rise. Further strengths include her exceptional speed, movement, and court coverage, detailed and intricate footwork, and intelligent point construction. Her favourite surface is clay, having grown up playing on that surface, although she has had success on all surfaces. Her clay court success is enhanced by her ability to slide on the surface; as her career has progressed, she has also developed the ability to slide on hard and grass courts, too.

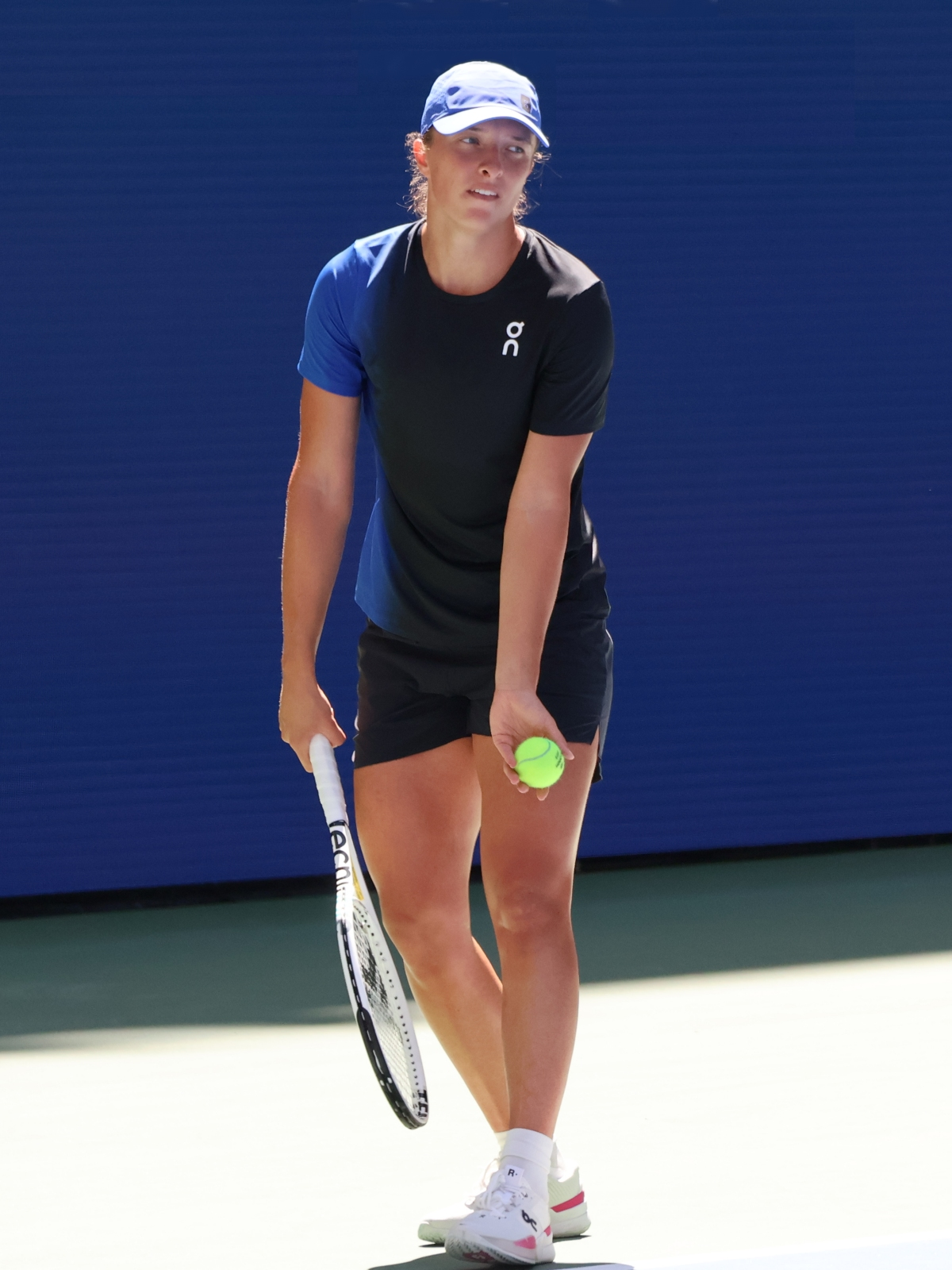
Świątek about to serve

=== Bagels and breadsticks ===
Over Świątek's WTA career up until May 2024, an average of 40.6 percent of her matches have included either a 6–0 (bagel) set or a 6–1 (breadstick) set. The New York Times have used the phrase "Iga's Bakery" to describe this. During the 2023 season, she won a bagel set in 29 percent of her matches compared with an average of 11.4 per cent of matches for matches in which she wasn't playing.

As of July 2025, she has won with a double-bagel scoreline nine times in her WTA career, three of which have come during grand slam tournaments (which were against Xinyu Wang in the 2023 French Open, against Anastasia Potapova in the 2024 French Open, and against Amanda Anisimova in the 2025 Wimbledon final).

== Coaching team ==
Świątek's primary coach in her early junior years was Michał Kaznowski, who she worked with up to the 2016 French Open. Jolanta Rusin-Krzepota was her physical preparation trainer for almost four years through the end of the 2019 US Open. Świątek was coached by Piotr Sierzputowski beginning in 2016. While Sierzputowski was her coach, British former professional tennis player and former Polish Davis Cup coach Nick Brown also served as a main consultant on occasion. Świątek also works with sports psychologist Daria Abramowicz and fitness trainer/physiologist Maciej Ryszczuk.

In December 2021, Świątek announced that she was splitting from Sierzputowski after nearly six years working together. She wrote, "This change is really challenging for me, and this decision wasn't easy, either". Świątek had hired Sierzputowski when she was 15 and still playing in junior tournaments. From the end of 2021 until October 2024, she was coached by Tomasz Wiktorowski, who also previously worked with Agnieszka Radwańska. In October 2024 it was announced that she had parted ways with Wiktorowski, appointing Wim Fissette as his replacement later that month. In an Instagram post on 23 March 2026, days after her streak of 73 consecutive opening round wins ended at the Miami Open, Swiatek announced she and Fissette have parted ways.

On April 2, 2026, Świątek announced that Francisco Roig, a longtime Rafael Nadal coach, joined her team.

== Endorsements ==
Świątek is now sponsored by the Roger Federer-backed Swiss company On for clothing and shoes, as of 20 March 2023, and became the first female tennis player to be sponsored by On. She had been sponsored by Asics for clothing and shoes since the start of 2020. She was previously sponsored by Nike. Świątek was also previously endorsed by the Red Bull energy drink company, the Chinese tech giant Xiaomi and the Lexus division of the Toyota automaker company, the latter of which have also sponsored fellow Polish tennis player Agnieszka Radwańska. From February 2021 till January 2024 her main partner was Poland's biggest insurance company PZU. In 2021, Świątek signed an endorsement deal with Tecnifibre for racquets; she previously used a Prince Textreme 100 Tour racquet, although she was not under contract with the company. To celebrate the victory at the 2022 French Open with a Tecnifibre racquet and to recognise the female athlete, the company changed its marketing name to Swiateknifibre and its trademark to the colours white and red for seven days. It was the first women's major title for this manufacturer. Świątek's father also confirmed that she had also signed a contract with Rolex in 2021.

After winning her third major title at the 2022 US Open, Świątek parted ways with her long-term manager, and began to be represented by IMG with agent Max Eisenbud. In 2023, Świątek announced that she has become a global ambassador for the Polish sports drink Oshee. She will also release a collaboration line with the brand, including her own drink flavour and bottle design. On 26 June 2023, Swiatek announced her partnership with Porsche. In August 2023, Swiatek became a global ambassador of VISA. On 25 August 2023, Infosys announced Swiatek as their global brand ambassador alongside Rafael Nadal. In April 2024, Świątek became the brand ambassador of Lancôme.

== Charity work and philanthropy ==
Since 2021, Świątek has been involved with The Great Orchestra of Christmas Charity. She has put up her winning racket from the final of her first French Open, the racket ended up getting sold with the price of 131,300 zł, which outpriced the signed Champions League winning kit of Robert Lewandowski, money helped to fund new equipment for pediatric ENT, otolaryngology and head diagnostics. In 2022, while playing at the Australian Open, she put up another racket, this time from final of Italian Open, but this time the offer also included training with the buyer. Besides the racket Świątek also put her signed Tokyo Olympics 2020 kit, her signature cap and multiple tennis balls with autographs up for auction. The offer was yet again met with a lot of interest and in the end was sold for 189,100 zł, which was the second best seller. The money would help to fund equipment for pediatric ophthalmology. In 2023, Świątek put up her winning racket with which she won both US Open and French Open in 2022. Besides the racket, she also included a double invitation to her first-round match at the 2023 French Open and an opportunity to meet her in person behind the scenes after the match. The pass would also allow the winners of the auction to watch all matches on the said day for free. All proceeds would go to funding medication for sepsis. Świątek's offer was auctioned for 300,300 zł, making it the most expensive auction.

Świątek and her team have also been taking part in the Noble Gift project since 2020. It helps to provide families, which have found themselves in difficult financial circumstances for reasons beyond their control during the Christmas period.

Świątek also took part in auction for SOS Children's Villages- Poland, putting up her autographed cap from Miami Open. In one of interviews the teacher from Świątek's elementary school in Raszyn revealed that after winning her second French Open title, she pledged to help upgrade the school's sports facilities, among which was a single tennis court. She also donated the shirt she wore in the final, tennis balls and her cap to the school, all signed for auction to raise money for one of the students who needed urgent and expensive medical treatment.

In November 2021, Świątek was announced in line-up for Africa Cares Tennis Challenge tennis exhibition in Johannesburg, which was aimed to not only promote tennis in South Africa but was to be used as a vehicle in the fight against Gender-Based Violence through campaigns and activations leading up to the main event. Other players in the line-up included Simona Halep, Venus Williams, Sloane Stephens and Martina Hingis. On 30 November it was announced event was cancelled due to concerns regarding growing amount of cases of COVID-19 infections.

=== Advocating mental health awareness ===
On 10 October 2021, Świątek donated $50,000 of her prize money in support of World Mental Health Day, after progressing to the last 16 of the Indian Wells Open. "I would say in sports, for me, it was always important to use that kind of help because I always thought that in my mental toughness there is some strength that I can use on court and I can also develop in that manner," she said. After winning in at the French Open in 2020, Świątek revealed that using her sports psychologist, Daria Abramowicz, had helped her get over the line. "It's just good to stay open-minded. If you need that kind of help, then go for it. If you're up to it and if you're open-minded, I think it helps a lot," Świątek added.

In her runner-up speech after losing the final to Barbora Krejčíková on the Ostrava Open on 9 October 2022, Świątek announced she will donate all of her prize money (€58,032) won in the tournament to Polish non-profit organizations and foundations to celebrate World Mental Health Day. "This is the most difficult moment of this tournament for me. I do not know what to say. Thank you so much. Whether I win or not, I am fulfilling my dreams, and you with me. I wish I won cause I would be able to donate more but I would like to announce that I will donate my prize money to non-profit organisations in Poland on Monday, which is World Mental Health Day. I hope this money can help a lot of people and make some change".

On 12 October 2023, Świątek announced that she would donate 300,000 PLN ($70,000) to UNICEF Poland to "help in the field of mental health in Poland and all over the world", as part of celebration of World Mental Health Day. Along with the major announcement, she shared her thoughts and motivated other people as well. "I would like to encourage you to have a look around and see if there's someone there who could use your help. You can make a donation of your choice to organizations like UNICEF that professionally help people (if you're able to)."

=== Support of Ukraine ===
Following the Russian invasion of Ukraine in 2022, Świątek has often worn ribbons or other accessories in Ukrainian colors, and on several occasions has publicly declared her support for Ukraine in her winner speeches.

On 23 July 2022, Świątek hosted a charity tennis event in Kraków, Poland to raise funds for children and teenagers impacted by the war in Ukraine. The one-day event featured a mixed doubles exhibition match and a set of singles between Świątek and Agnieszka Radwańska. Ukraine football great Andriy Shevchenko was a special guest. Elina Svitolina of Ukraine served as umpire for the event. Świątek stated, "I hope that we can see each other in large numbers in TAURON Arena Krakow and in front of the television to show the strength of sport when it unites us in helping and gives us at least a little joy." Świątek later announced on Twitter that the event has raised over 2,5 mln złoty (over €500,000), which would be spread between United 24, Elina Svitolina Foundation and UNICEF Poland.

On 10 August, Świątek has been announced as the part of line up for "Tennis Plays for Peace" exhibition, which took place on 24 August with other numerous current and former tennis stars like Rafael Nadal, Carlos Alcaraz, Coco Gauff, John McEnroe, Stefanos Tsitsipas, Matteo Berrettini, Maria Sakkari and many others, 100% of the proceeds going to GlobalGiving, the international non-profit identified by Tennis Plays for Peace.

On 9 January 2023, Świątek took to Twitter and Instagram to announce that her 'Iga & Friends' and '1ga' T-shirts will be available for sale at Allegro Charity, where she and UNICEF Poland have once again joined forces to raise funds for children in war-torn Ukraine. On 11 January, Świątek announced on her social media platforms that she will be auctioning off her US Open winning gear and French Open shoes, among others all proceeds would also be going straight to UNICEF.

== Personal life ==
Świątek lives in Raszyn, Poland. She is a keen reader and in an interview has explained it helps her relax between tennis matches. One of her favourite dishes is a Polish speciality, Makaron z truskawkami (pasta with strawberries). Świątek has expressed her love for rock music, citing bands such as Guns N' Roses, AC/DC, Led Zeppelin, Pearl Jam and Red Hot Chili Peppers as some of her favourites. She is a fan of LEGO and has stated that building LEGO while on tour aids her mentally and calms her down.

Świątek is an avid fan of the American musician Taylor Swift and has been to some of her concerts.

== Career statistics ==
=== Grand Slam tournament performance timelines ===
Key
**W**	F	SF	QF	#R	RR	Q#	DNQ	A	NH

(W) winner; (F) finalist; (SF) semifinalist; (QF) quarterfinalist; (#R) rounds 4, 3, 2, 1; (RR) round-robin stage; (Q#) qualification round; (DNQ) did not qualify; (A) absent; (NH) not held; (SR) strike rate (events won / competed); (W–L) win–loss record.
To avoid confusion and double counting, these charts are updated at the conclusion of a tournament or when the player's participation has ended.

==== Singles ====
Tournament	2019	2020	2021	2022	2023	2024	2025	2026	SR	W–L	Win %
Australian Open	2R	4R	4R	SF	4R	3R	SF	QF	0 / 8	26–8	76%
French Open	4R	**W**	QF	**W**	**W**	**W**	SF	4R	4 / 8	43–4	91%
Wimbledon	1R	NH	4R	3R	QF	3R	**W**	3R	1 / 7	20–6	77%
US Open	2R	3R	4R	**W**	4R	QF	QF	4R	1 / 8	27–7	79%
**Win–loss**	**5–4**	**12–2**	**13–4**	**21–2**	**17–3**	**15–3**	**21–3**	**12–4**	**6 / 31**	**116–25**	**82%**

==== Doubles ====
Tournament	2019	2020	2021	SR	W–L
Australian Open	A	A	A	0 / 0	0–0
French Open	A	SF	F	0 / 2	9–2
Wimbledon	A	NH	A	0 / 0	0–0
US Open	2R	A	A	0 / 1	1–1
**Win–loss**	**1–1**	**4–1**	**5–1**	**0 / 3**	**10–3**

=== Grand Slam tournament finals ===
==== Singles: 6 (6 titles) ====
Result	Year	Tournament	Surface	Opponent	Score
Win	2020	French Open	Clay	(United States) Sofia Kenin	6–4, 6–1
Win	2022	French Open (2)	Clay	(United States) Coco Gauff	6–1, 6–3
Win	2022	US Open	Hard	(Tunisia) Ons Jabeur	6–2, 7–6^{(7–5)}
Win	2023	French Open (3)	Clay	(Czech Republic) Karolína Muchová	6–2, 5–7, 6–4
Win	2024	French Open (4)	Clay	(Italy) Jasmine Paolini	6–2, 6–1
Win	2025	Wimbledon	Grass	(United States) Amanda Anisimova	6–0, 6–0

==== Doubles: 1 (runner-up) ====
Result	Year	Tournament	Surface	Partner	Opponents	Score
Loss	2021	French Open	Clay	(United States) Bethanie Mattek-Sands	(Czech Republic) Barbora Krejčíková (Czech Republic) Kateřina Siniaková	4–6, 2–6

==== Mixed doubles: 1 (runner-up) ====
Result	Year	Tournament	Surface	Partner	Opponents	Score
Loss	2025	US Open	Hard	(Norway) Casper Ruud	(Italy) Sara Errani (Italy) Andrea Vavassori	3–6, 7–5, [6–10]

=== Year-end championship finals ===
==== Singles: 1 (title) ====
Result	Year	Tournament	Surface	Opponent	Score
Win	2023	WTA Finals, Mexico	Hard	(United States) Jessica Pegula	6–1, 6–0

=== Olympic Games medal matches ===
==== Singles: 1 (bronze medal) ====
Result	Year	Tournament	Surface	Opponent	Score
Bronze	2024	Paris Summer Olympics, France	Clay	(Slovakia) Anna Karolína Schmiedlová	6–2, 6–1

=== Records ===
==== Open Era records ====
- These records were attained in the Open Era of tennis.
- Records in **bold** indicate peer-less achievements.

Tournament	Year	Record accomplished	Player tied
WTA Tour	2022	Longest winning streak of 21st century (37 matches)	**Stands alone**
WTA Tour	2022	Youngest woman to complete the Sunshine Double (20 years, 10 months)	**Stands alone**
WTA Tour	2021–2026	Won 73 consecutive opening matches	**Stands alone**
WTA Tour	2026	Youngest player to reach the semifinals of all 10 current WTA 1000 tournaments (25 years, 4 months)	**Stands alone**
Grand Slam tournaments	2020–2023	Won first seven major final sets played in	**Stands alone**
Wimbledon	2025	Won a major final by double bagel (6–0, 6–0)	Dorothea Lambert Chambers; Steffi Graf
French Open	2024	Youngest player (23 years and 8 days) to secure their fourth Woman's Singles title	**Stands alone**
Qatar Open	2023	Fewest total games lost (5) on the way to a WTA title (only played three matches)	**Stands alone**
WTA Finals	2023	The fewest games (20) dropped to win the tournament since re-introduction of round robin format	**Stands alone**
WTA Finals	2023	The fewest games (1) dropped in the final	**Stands alone**

== Awards ==
2019

- WTA Fan Favorite Shot of the Year

2020

- WTA Most Improved Player
- WTA Fan Favorite Singles Player
- Gold Cross of Merit
- European Sportswoman of the Year – Evgen Bergant Trophy

2022

- Chris Evert WTA World No. 1 Trophy
- WTA Player of the Year
- ITF World Champion
- WTA Fan Favourite Shot of the Year
- European Sportsperson of the Year
- Polish Sports Personality of the Year

2023

- L'Équipe Champion of Champions
- WTA Player of the Year
- Polish Sports Personality of the Year

2024

- ITF World Champion

=== Mentions ===
Publisher	Year	Listicle	Placement	Ref
Forbes	2022	Forbes 30 Under 30-Europe	Placed	
Forbes	2022	World's Highest-Paid Female Athletes	5th	
Forbes	2023	Forbes 30 Under 30-Europe	Placed	
Time	2023	100 Most Influential People	Placed	
Forbes	2023	World's Highest-Paid Female Athletes	1st	

== Notes ==
Sporting positions
Preceded by Ashleigh Barty	World No. 1; 4 April 2022 – 10 September 2023	Succeeded by Aryna Sabalenka
Preceded by Aryna Sabalenka	World No. 1; 6 November 2023 – 20 October 2024	Succeeded by Aryna Sabalenka
Awards and achievements
Preceded by Simona Halep	Fan Favorite Shot of the Year; 2019	Succeeded by Magda Linette
Preceded by Sofia Kenin	Most Improved Player; 2020	Succeeded by Barbora Krejcikova
Preceded by Simona Halep	WTA Fan Favorite Awards; 2020	Succeeded by Zheng Qinwen
Preceded by Ashleigh Barty	WTA Player of the Year; 2022–2023	Succeeded by Aryna Sabalenka
Preceded by Ashleigh Barty	ITF World Champion; 2022	Succeeded by Aryna Sabalenka
Preceded by Aryna Sabalenka	ITF World Champion; 2024	Incumbent
