= 2022 Ostrava Open – Singles =

Czech tennis tournament

Singles
- 2022 Ostrava Open

Final
- Champion: (Czech Republic) Barbora Krejčíková
- Runner-up: (Poland) Iga Świątek
- Score: 5–7, 7–6^{(7–4)}, 6–3

Details
- Draw: 28
- Seeds: 8

Events
Singles	Doubles
- Ostrava Open

Barbora Krejčíková defeated Iga Świątek in the final, 5–7, 7–6^{(7–4)}, 6–3 to win the singles tennis title at the 2022 Ostrava Open. It was Krejčíková's second WTA Tour title in back-to-back weeks, and she ended Świątek's streak of ten consecutive victories in WTA Tour finals. This marked only Świątek's second career loss in a WTA Tour-level final, out of twelve played (the other being at the 2019 Ladies Open Lugano).

Anett Kontaveit was the defending champion, but retired in the second round against Tereza Martincová.

== Seeds ==
The top four seeds received a bye into the second round.

1. (Poland) Iga Świątek (final)
2. (Spain) Paula Badosa (second round)
3. (Estonia) Anett Kontaveit (second round, retired)
4. (Greece) Maria Sakkari (second round)
5. Daria Kasatkina (second round)
6. (Switzerland) Belinda Bencic (second round, withdrew)
7. (Brazil) Beatriz Haddad Maia (first round)
8. (Latvia) Jeļena Ostapenko (first round)

== Draw ==
Key

- Q = Qualifier
- WC = Wild card
- LL = Lucky loser
- Alt = Alternate
- ITF = ITF entry
- PR = Protected ranking
- SR = Special ranking
- SE = Special exempt
- JE = Junior exempt
- JR = Junior Accelerator Programme entrant
- CO = College Accelerator Programme entrant
- NG = Next Gen Accelerator Program entrant
- w/o = Walkover
- r = Retired
- d = Defaulted

=== Finals ===
Semifinals
1	(Poland) Iga Świątek	7^{7}	2	6
Ekaterina Alexandrova	6^{5}	6	4
(Czech Republic) Barbora Krejčíková	3	7^{7}	6
(Kazakhstan) Elena Rybakina	6	6^{4}	4

Final
1	(Poland) Iga Świątek	7	6^{4}	3
(Czech Republic) Barbora Krejčíková	5	7^{7}	6

=== Top half ===
First round
Q	(Australia) A Tomljanović	6	6
(China) S Zhang	3	3
Q	A Blinkova	1	2
Q	(United States) C McNally	6	6
WC	(Czech Republic) K Muchová	6	6
7	(Brazil) B Haddad Maia	4	4
(Switzerland) J Teichmann	6^{1}	6^{5}
WC	(Czech Republic) T Martincová	7^{7}	7^{7}
V Azarenka	4	6	2
E Alexandrova	6	4	6
(United Kingdom) E Raducanu	5	4
5	D Kasatkina	7	6

Second round
1	(Poland) I Świątek	7	2
Q	(Australia) A Tomljanović	5	2^{r}
Q	(United States) C McNally	6	3	6
WC	(Czech Republic) K Muchová	1	6	1
3	(Estonia) A Kontaveit	6^{3}	0^{r}
WC	(Czech Republic) T Martincová	7^{7}	1
E Alexandrova	6	7^{7}
5	D Kasatkina	1	6^{1}

Quarterfinals
1	(Poland) I Świątek	6	6
Q	(United States) C McNally	4	4
WC	(Czech Republic) T Martincová	1	6	1
E Alexandrova	6	4	6

Semifinals
1	(Poland) I Świątek	7^{7}	2	6
E Alexandrova	6^{5}	6	4

=== Bottom half ===
First round
6	(Switzerland) B Bencic	6^{7}	6	6
Q	(Canada) E Bouchard	7^{9}	1	4
(United States) S Rogers	2	2
(Czech Republic) B Krejčíková	6	6
Q	(United States) A Parks	6	7^{7}
(Czech Republic) Ka Plíšková	0	6^{3}
8	(Latvia) J Ostapenko	2	2
A Sasnovich	6	6
(United States) M Keys	7	3	3
(Kazakhstan) E Rybakina	5	6	6
WC	(Czech Republic) P Kvitová	6	2	6
Q	(United States) B Pera	3	6	4

Second round
6	(Switzerland) B Bencic
(Czech Republic) B Krejčíková	w/o
Q	(United States) A Parks	5	7	7
4	(Greece) M Sakkari	7	5	5
A Sasnovich	7^{7}	4	5
(Kazakhstan) E Rybakina	6^{5}	6	7
WC	(Czech Republic) P Kvitová	7^{7}	6
2	(Spain) P Badosa	6^{4}	4

Quarterfinals
(Czech Republic) B Krejčíková	7^{9}	6
Q	(United States) A Parks	6^{7}	3
(Kazakhstan) E Rybakina	7^{7}	6
WC	(Czech Republic) P Kvitová	6^{4}	4

Semifinals
(Czech Republic) B Krejčíková	3	7^{7}	6
(Kazakhstan) E Rybakina	6	6^{4}	4

== Qualifying ==
=== Seeds ===
1. (Australia) Ajla Tomljanović (qualified)
2. (United States) Bernarda Pera (qualified)
3. (Ukraine) Marta Kostyuk (withdrew)
4. (China) Wang Xiyu (first round)
5. (Hungary) Dalma Gálfi (qualifying competition)
6. (Germany) Tamara Korpatsch (qualifying competition)
7. (France) Océane Dodin (first round)
8. (Czech Republic) Linda Nosková (first round)
9. (Ukraine) Daria Snigur (first round)
10. (Slovakia) Anna Karolína Schmiedlová (qualifying competition)
11. Anna Blinkova (qualified)
12. Oksana Selekhmeteva (first round)

=== Qualifiers ===
1. (Australia) Ajla Tomljanović
2. (United States) Bernarda Pera
3. (United States) Alycia Parks
4. (United States) Caty McNally
5. (Canada) Eugenie Bouchard
6. Anna Blinkova

=== Qualifying draw ===
==== First qualifier ====
First round
1	(Australia) Ajla Tomljanović	6	6
(Romania) Alexandra Cadanțu-Ignatik	1	0
PR	(Spain) Georgina García Pérez	4	7^{7}	6
9	(Ukraine) Daria Snigur	6	6^{5}	4

Qualifying competition
1	(Australia) Ajla Tomljanović	6	6
PR	(Spain) Georgina García Pérez	3	3

==== Second qualifier ====
First round
2	(United States) Bernarda Pera	6	6
WC	(Czech Republic) Barbora Palicová	1	3
WC	(Czech Republic) Nikola Bartůňková	6	7
8	(Czech Republic) Linda Nosková	3	5

Qualifying competition
2	(United States) Bernarda Pera	6	3	6
WC	(Czech Republic) Nikola Bartůňková	0	6	2

==== Third qualifier ====
First round
Alt	(Germany) Anna-Lena Friedsam	6	6
Anastasia Zakharova	1	4
(United States) Alycia Parks	6	6
12	Oksana Selekhmeteva	4	1

Qualifying competition
Alt	(Germany) Anna-Lena Friedsam	4	6^{4}
(United States) Alycia Parks	6	7^{7}

==== Fourth qualifier ====
First round
4	(China) Wang Xiyu	3	3
(United States) Caty McNally	6	6
WC	(Czech Republic) Tereza Valentová	6	3	1
10	(Slovakia) Anna Karolína Schmiedlová	3	6	6

Qualifying competition
(United States) Caty McNally	6	6
10	(Slovakia) Anna Karolína Schmiedlová	4	1

==== Fifth qualifier ====
First round
5	(Hungary) Dalma Gálfi	7^{7}	6
WC	(Czech Republic) Lucie Havlíčková	6^{3}	3
PR	(Canada) Eugenie Bouchard	6	4	6
7	(France) Océane Dodin	2	6	3

Qualifying competition
5	(Hungary) Dalma Gálfi	3	2
PR	(Canada) Eugenie Bouchard	6	6

==== Sixth qualifier ====
First round
6	(Germany) Tamara Korpatsch	6	6
(Romania) Gabriela Lee	3	2
(France) Jessika Ponchet	4	4
11	Anna Blinkova	6	6

Qualifying competition
6	(Germany) Tamara Korpatsch	0	4
11	Anna Blinkova	6	6
